= Benjamin Netanyahu =

Prime Minister of Israel (1996–1999; 2009–2021; 2022–present)

- בִּנְיָמִין נְתַנְיָהוּ
- Official portrait, 2023

Prime Minister of Israel
- Caretaker
- Assumed office 29 December 2022 (Note: Caretaker since 27 October 2026)
- President: Isaac Herzog
- Deputy: Yariv Levin
- Preceded by: Yair Lapid
- In office 31 March 2009 – 13 June 2021
- President: Shimon Peres; Reuven Rivlin
- Alternate: Benny Gantz (2020–2021)
- Preceded by: Ehud Olmert
- Succeeded by: Naftali Bennett
- In office 18 June 1996 – 6 July 1999
- President: Ezer Weizman
- Preceded by: Shimon Peres
- Succeeded by: Ehud Barak

Leader of the Opposition
- In office 28 June 2021 – 29 December 2022
- Prime Minister: Naftali Bennett; Yair Lapid
- Preceded by: Yair Lapid
- Succeeded by: Yair Lapid
- In office 16 January 2006 – 31 March 2009
- Prime Minister: Ariel Sharon; Ehud Olmert
- Preceded by: Amir Peretz
- Succeeded by: Tzipi Livni
- De facto 24 March 1993 – 18 June 1996
- Prime Minister: Yitzhak Rabin; Shimon Peres
- Preceded by: Yitzhak Shamir
- Succeeded by: Shimon Peres

Chairman of Likud
- Incumbent
- Assumed office 20 December 2005
- Preceded by: Ariel Sharon
- In office 24 March 1993 – 6 July 1999
- Preceded by: Yitzhak Shamir
- Succeeded by: Ariel Sharon

Permanent Representative of Israel to the United Nations
- In office 1 September 1984 – 1 March 1988
- Prime Minister: Yitzhak Shamir; Shimon Peres; Yitzhak Shamir
- Preceded by: Yehuda Zvi Blum
- Succeeded by: Yohanan Bein

Member of the Knesset
- Incumbent
- Assumed office 17 February 2003
- In office 21 November 1988 – 6 July 1999

Ministerial roles
- 1996–1997: Science and Technology
- 1996–1999: Housing and Construction
- 2002–2003: Foreign Affairs
- 2003–2005: Finance
- 2009–2013: Economic Strategy; Health; Pensioner Affairs
- 2012–2013: Foreign Affairs

Personal details
- Born: 21 October 1949 (age 77) Tel Aviv, Israel
- Party: Likud (since 1988)
- Other political affiliations: Likud Beiteinu (2012–2014); Herut (until 1988)
- Spouses: Miriam Weizmann (m. 1972; div. 1978) Fleur Cates (m. 1981; div. 1988) Sara Ben-Artzi (m. 1991)
- Children: 3, including Yair
- Relatives: Netanyahu family
- Education: Massachusetts Institute of Technology (BS, MS); Harvard University
- Occupation: Diplomat; management consultant; marketing executive; politician; writer
- Cabinet: 27; 32; 33; 34; 35; 37
- Awards: Full list
- Website: www.netanyahu.org.il
- Nickname: Bibi

Military service
- Branch/service: Israel Defense Forces
- Years of service: 1967–1973
- Rank: Séren (Captain)
- Unit: Sayeret Matkal
- Battles/wars: War of Attrition; Battle of Karameh; 1968 Israeli raid on Lebanon; Yom Kippur War
- Netanyahu's voice Netanyahu speaking on the Gaza peace plan Recorded 29 September 2025

Benjamin "Bibi" Netanyahu (Note: Pronounced /ˌnɛtənˈjɑːhuː/ NET-ən-YAH-hoo; Hebrew: בִּנְיָמִין "בִּיבִּי" נְתַנְיָהוּ, romanized: Binyamin Netanyahu, pronounced [binjaˈmin netanˈjahu]) (born 21 October 1949) is an Israeli politician and diplomat who has served as prime minister of Israel since 2022. Having previously held office from 1996 to 1999 and from 2009 to 2021, Netanyahu is Israel's longest-serving prime minister.

Born in Tel Aviv, Netanyahu was raised in West Jerusalem and the United States. He returned to Israel in 1967 to join the Israel Defense Forces and served in the Sayeret Matkal special forces. In 1972, he returned to the US, and after graduating from the Massachusetts Institute of Technology, Netanyahu worked for the Boston Consulting Group. He moved back to Israel in 1978 and founded The Jonathan Institute. Between 1984 and 1988, Netanyahu was Israel's ambassador to the United Nations. Netanyahu rose to prominence after his election as chair of Likud in 1993, becoming leader of the opposition. In the 1996 general election, Netanyahu became the first Israeli prime minister elected directly by popular vote. Netanyahu was defeated in the 1999 election and entered the private sector. He served as minister of foreign affairs and finance, initiating economic reforms, before resigning over the Gaza disengagement plan.

Netanyahu returned to lead Likud in 2005, leading the opposition between 2006 and 2009. After the 2009 legislative election, Netanyahu formed a coalition and became prime minister again. Netanyahu made his closeness to Donald Trump central to his appeal from 2016. During Trump's first presidency, the US recognized Jerusalem as capital of Israel, Israeli sovereignty over the Golan Heights, and brokered the Abraham Accords between Israel and the Arab world. Netanyahu was criticized for expanding Israeli settlements in the occupied West Bank, deemed illegal under international law. In 2019, Netanyahu was indicted on charges of breach of trust, bribery and fraud, and relinquished all ministerial posts except prime minister. The 2018–2022 Israeli political crisis resulted in a rotation agreement between Netanyahu and Benny Gantz. This collapsed in 2020, leading to a 2021 election. In June 2021, Netanyahu was removed as prime minister, before returning after the 2022 election.

Netanyahu's governments have been criticized for perceived democratic backsliding and an alleged shift toward authoritarianism. His coalition's 2023 judicial reform proposals sparked mass protests, while the October 7 Hamas-led attacks and the ensuing Gaza war led to nationwide protests over the security lapses and the failure to secure the Israeli hostages' return. His later tenure was marked by escalating regional conflicts and a personal security threat. In 2024, Israel exchanged strikes with Iran, while Netanyahu ordered invasions of Lebanon and Syria and survived an assassination attempt in October. In 2025, he presided over Israeli strikes on Iran that began the Twelve-Day War, and in 2026 he launched the Iran war alongside the United States with the stated goal of regime change, followed by renewed fighting with Hezbollah that led to a second invasion of Lebanon.

Netanyahu's government has been orchestrating the Gaza genocide, leading to the South Africa v. Israel case before the International Court of Justice (ICJ) in December 2023. The International Criminal Court (ICC) issued an arrest warrant in November 2024 for Netanyahu for alleged war crimes and crimes against humanity as part of the ICC investigation in Palestine. Netanyahu's leadership has resulted in a substantial decline in global opinion of Israel.

== Early life, education, and military career ==
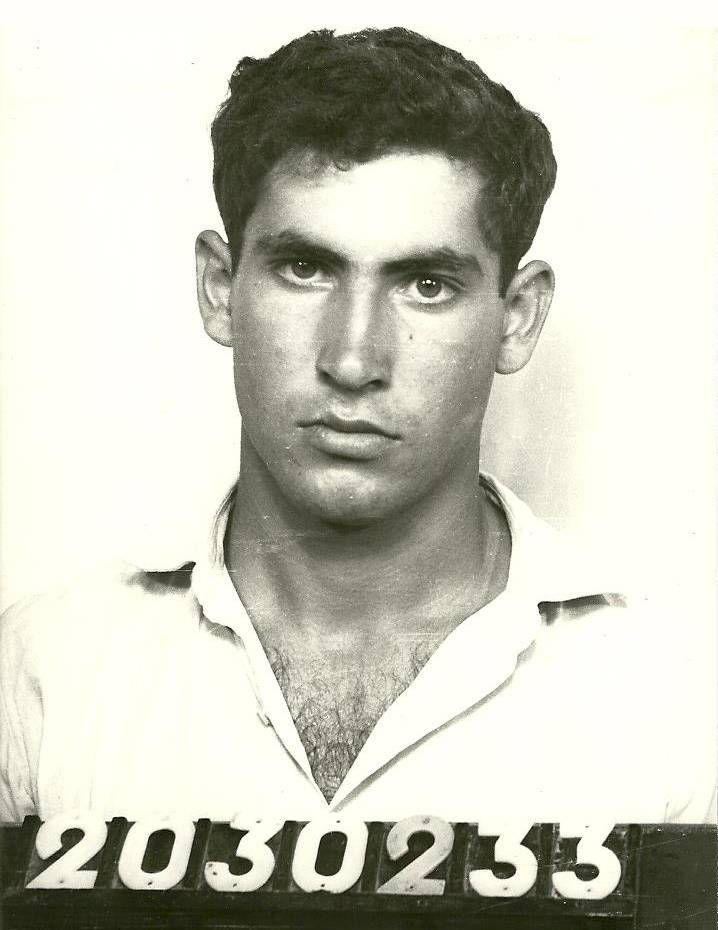
1967 photograph of Netanyahu by the Israel Defense Forces

Netanyahu was born in 1949 in Tel Aviv. His mother, Tzila Segal, was born in Petah Tikva in the Mutasarrifate of Jerusalem—her family had migrated from Minneapolis in 1911, having relocated there from Lithuania in the 1870s—and studied law at Gray's Inn, London. His father, Warsaw-born Benzion Netanyahu (né Mileikowsky), was a historian specializing in the Jewish Golden Age of Spain. His paternal grandfather, Nathan Mileikowsky, was a rabbi and Zionist writer. When Netanyahu's father immigrated to Mandatory Palestine, he adopted the Hebrew surname "Netanyahu", meaning "God has given". His family is predominantly Ashkenazi, but he has said that a DNA test revealed some Sephardic ancestry. He claims descent from the Vilna Gaon.

Netanyahu was the second of three children. He was initially raised in Jerusalem, where he attended Henrietta Szold Elementary School. His evaluation by his 6th-grade teacher Ruth Rubenstein says that Netanyahu was courteous, polite, and helpful; "responsible and punctual"; and friendly, disciplined, cheerful, brave, active, and obedient.

Between 1956 and 1958, and from 1963 to 1967, his family lived in the United States in Cheltenham Township, Pennsylvania, while Benzion Netanyahu taught at Dropsie College. Benjamin graduated from Cheltenham High School and was active in the debate club, chess club, and soccer. He and his brother Yonatan grew dissatisfied with what they saw as the superficial way of life in the area, including the prevalent youth counterculture movement and the liberal sensibilities of the Reform synagogue, Temple Judea of Philadelphia, that the family attended.

After graduating from high school in 1967, Netanyahu returned to Israel to enlist in the Israel Defense Forces. He trained as a combat soldier and served for five years in a special forces unit of the IDF, Sayeret Matkal. He took part in numerous cross-border raids during the 1967–70 War of Attrition, including the March 1968 Battle of Karameh, when the IDF attacked Jordan to capture PLO leader Yasser Arafat but were repulsed with heavy casualties. He became a team-leader in the unit. He was wounded in combat on multiple occasions. He was involved in many other missions, including the 1968 Israeli raid on Lebanon and the rescue of the hijacked Sabena Flight 571 in May 1972, during which he was shot in the shoulder. He was discharged from active service in 1972 but remained in the Sayeret Matkal reserves. Following his discharge, he left to study in the United States but returned in October 1973 to serve in the Yom Kippur War.

=== Higher education ===
Netanyahu returned to the United States in late 1972 to study architecture at the Massachusetts Institute of Technology (MIT). After returning to Israel to fight in the Yom Kippur War, he returned to the United States and, under the name Ben Nitay, completed a Bachelor of Science in architecture in February 1975. In 1976 he earned a master's degree from the MIT Sloan School of Management. Concurrently, he was studying toward a doctorate in political science. His studies were broken off by the death of his brother, Yonatan, who led the Entebbe raid.

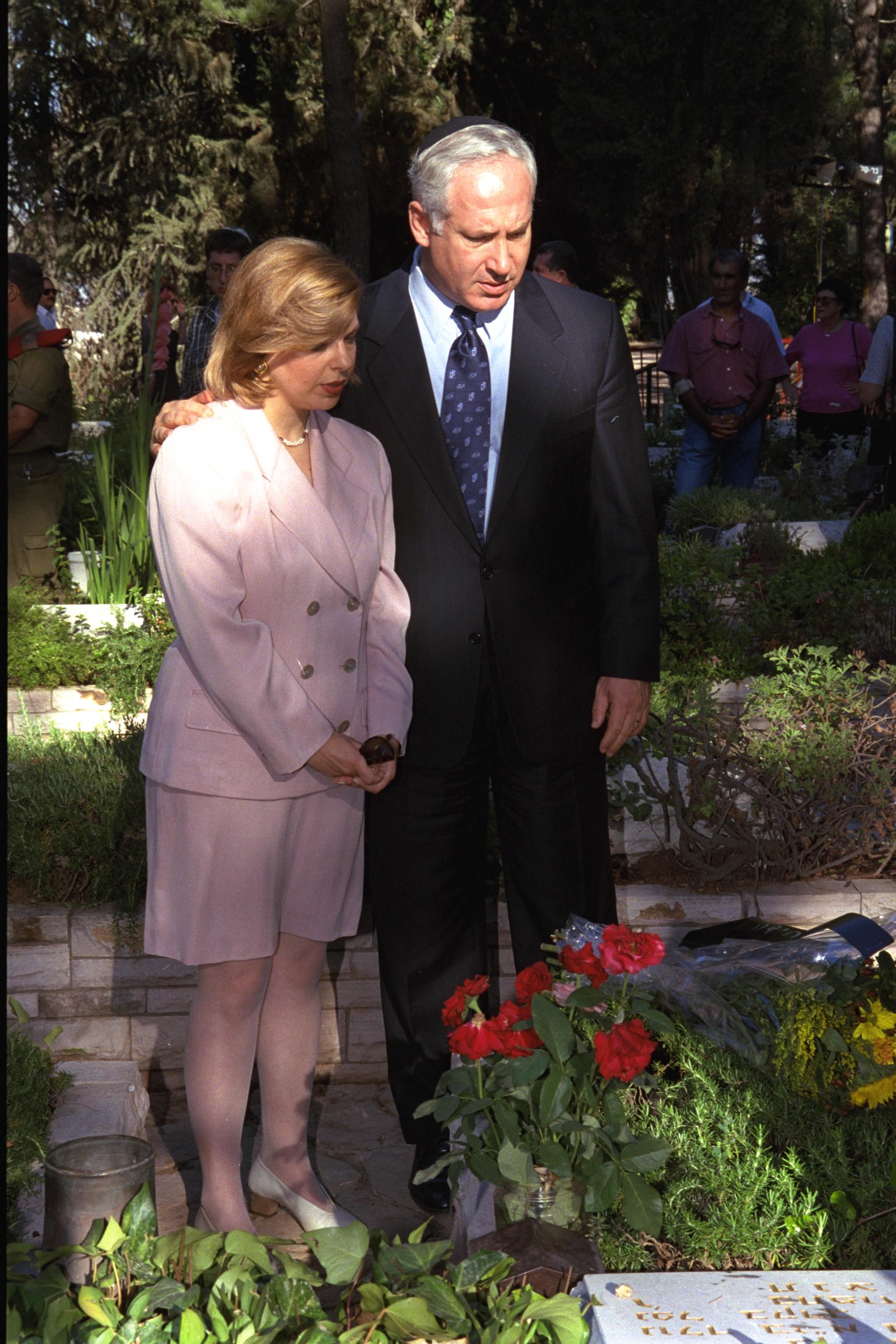
Benjamin Netanyahu at the grave of his brother Yoni Netanyahu, who was killed leading the Entebbe raid in 1976

At MIT, Netanyahu studied a double-load while taking courses at Harvard University, completing his bachelor's degree in architecture in two and a half years, despite taking a break to fight in the Yom Kippur War. MIT professor Leon B. Groisser recalled: "He did superbly. He was very bright. Organized. Strong. Powerful. He knew what he wanted to do and how to get it done."

At that time he changed his name to Benjamin "Ben" Nitai (Nitai, a reference to both Mount Nitai and the eponymous Jewish sage Nittai of Arbela, a pen name his father often used). Years later, in an interview with the media, Netanyahu clarified that he decided to do so to make it easier for Americans to pronounce his name. This fact has been used by his political rivals to accuse him indirectly of a lack of Israeli national identity and loyalty.

== Early career ==
Netanyahu worked as an economic consultant for the Boston Consulting Group in Boston, Massachusetts, working at the company between 1976 and 1978. At the Boston Consulting Group, he was a colleague of Mitt Romney, with whom he formed a lasting friendship. Romney described Netanyahu at the time as "a strong personality with a distinct point of view". Netanyahu said that their "easy communication" was a result of "B.C.G.'s intellectually rigorous boot camp".

In 1977, Netanyahu told a dinner party attended by British journalist and historian Max Hastings (who was interviewing the family for a book on Yonatan) that in a future war Israel would have the chance to "get all the Arabs out" of the West Bank and Jerusalem.

In 1978, Netanyahu appeared on Boston local television, under the name Ben Nitay, where he argued: "The real core of the conflict is the unfortunate Arab refusal to accept the State of Israel ... For 20 years the Arabs had both the West Bank and the Gaza Strip, and if self-determination, as they now say, is the core of the conflict, they could have easily established a Palestinian state."

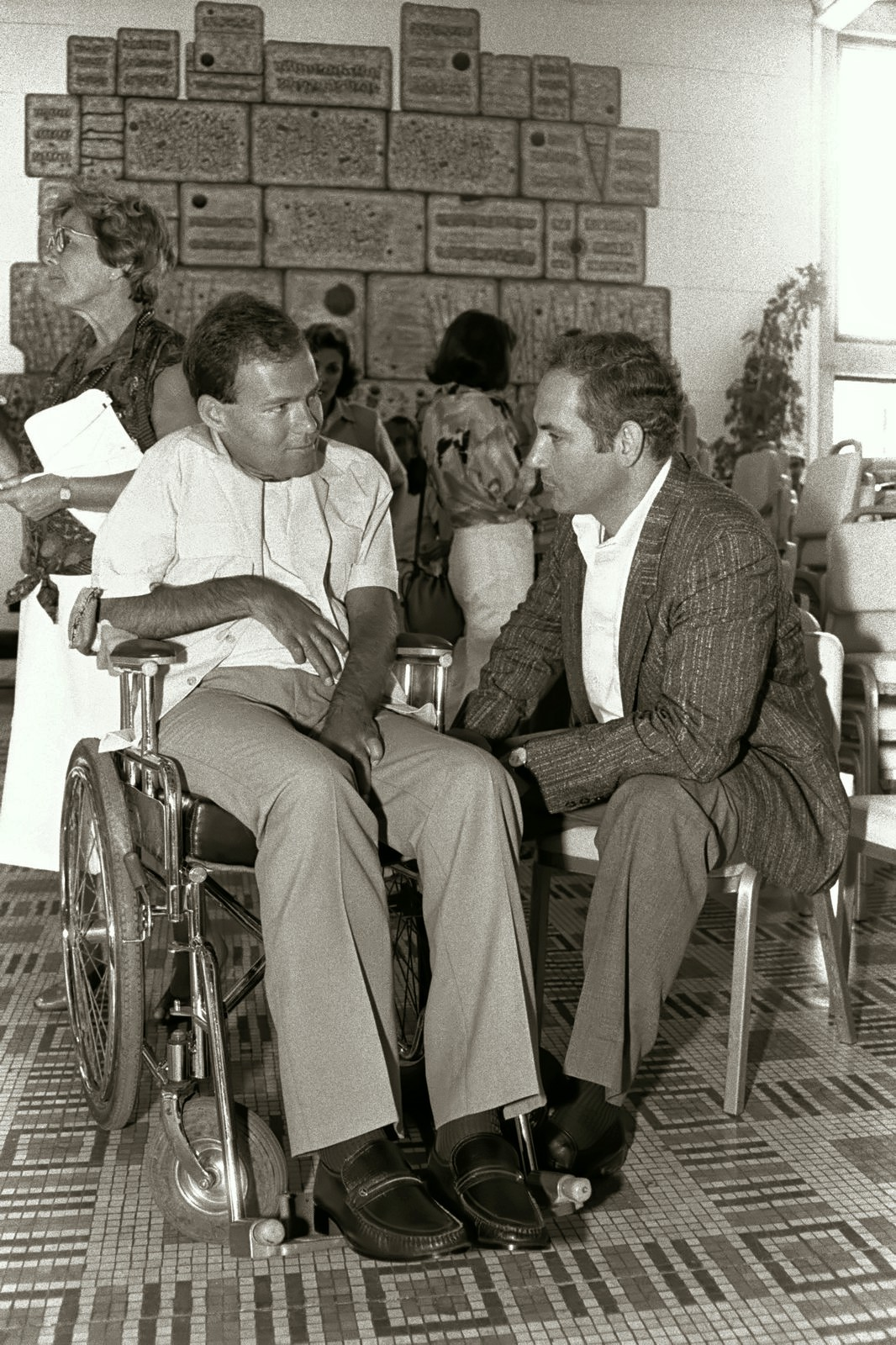
Netanyahu (right) with Sorin Hershko, a soldier wounded and permanently paralyzed in Operation Entebbe, 2 July 1986

In 1978, Netanyahu returned to Israel. Between 1978 and 1980, he ran the Jonathan Netanyahu Anti-Terror Institute, a non-governmental organization devoted to the study of terrorism. From 1980 to 1982, he was director of marketing for Rim Industries in Jerusalem.

Moshe Arens appointed him as his Deputy Chief of Mission at the Israeli Embassy in Washington, D.C., while Arens was ambassador to the United States, a position he held from 1982 until 1984. During the 1982 Lebanon War, he was called up for reserve duty in Sayeret Matkal and requested to be released from service, preferring to remain in the US and serve as a spokesperson for Israel in the wake of harsh international criticism of the war. He presented Israel's case to the media during the war and established a highly efficient public relations system in the Israeli embassy. Between 1984 and 1988, Netanyahu served as the Israeli ambassador to the United Nations. Netanyahu was influenced by Rabbi Menachem M. Schneerson, with whom he formed a relationship during the 1980s. He referred to Schneerson as "the most influential man of our time". Also during the 1980s, Netanyahu became friends with Fred Trump, the father of future U.S. president Donald Trump.

== Political career ==
=== Leader of the Opposition (1993–1996) ===
Prior to the 1988 Israeli legislative election, Netanyahu returned to Israel and joined the Likud party. In the Likud's internal elections, Netanyahu was placed fifth on the party list. Later on he was elected as a Knesset member of the 12th Knesset, and was appointed as a deputy of the foreign minister Moshe Arens, and later on David Levy. Netanyahu and Levy did not cooperate and the rivalry between the two only intensified afterwards. During the Gulf War in early 1991, the English-fluent Netanyahu emerged as the principal spokesman for Israel in media interviews on CNN and other news outlets. During the Madrid Conference of 1991 Netanyahu was a member of the Israeli delegation headed by Prime Minister Yitzhak Shamir. After the Madrid Conference Netanyahu was appointed as Deputy Minister in the Israeli Prime Minister's Office.

Following the defeat of the Likud party in the 1992 Israeli legislative elections the Likud party held a party leadership election in 1993, and Netanyahu was victorious, defeating Benny Begin, son of the late prime minister Menachem Begin, and veteran politician David Levy (Sharon initially sought Likud party leadership as well, but quickly withdrew when it was evident that he was attracting minimal support). Shamir retired from politics shortly after the Likud's defeat in the 1992 elections.

Following the assassination of Yitzhak Rabin at the end of a rally in support of the Oslo Accords, Rabin's temporary successor Shimon Peres decided to call early elections in order to give the government a mandate to advance the peace process. Netanyahu was the Likud's candidate for prime minister in the 1996 Israeli legislative election which took place on 29 May 1996 and were the first Israeli elections in which Israelis elected their prime minister directly. Netanyahu hired American political operative Arthur Finkelstein to run his campaign. Netanyahu won the 1996 election, becoming the youngest person in the history of the position and the first Israeli prime minister to be born in the State of Israel (Yitzhak Rabin was born in Jerusalem, under the British Mandate of Palestine, prior to the 1948 founding of the Israeli state).

Netanyahu's victory over the pre-election favorite Shimon Peres surprised many. The main catalyst in the downfall of the latter was a wave of suicide bombings shortly before the elections; on 3 and 4 March 1996, Palestinians carried out two suicide bombings, killing 32 Israelis, with Peres seemingly unable to stop the attacks. During the campaign, Netanyahu stressed that progress in the peace process would be based on the Palestinian National Authority fulfilling its obligations – mainly fighting terrorism – and the Likud campaign slogan was, "Netanyahu – making a safe peace". Although Netanyahu won the election for prime minister, Peres's Israeli Labor Party received more seats in the Knesset elections. Netanyahu had to rely on a coalition with the ultra-Orthodox parties, Shas and UTJ in order to form a government.

=== Prime Minister (1996–1999) ===
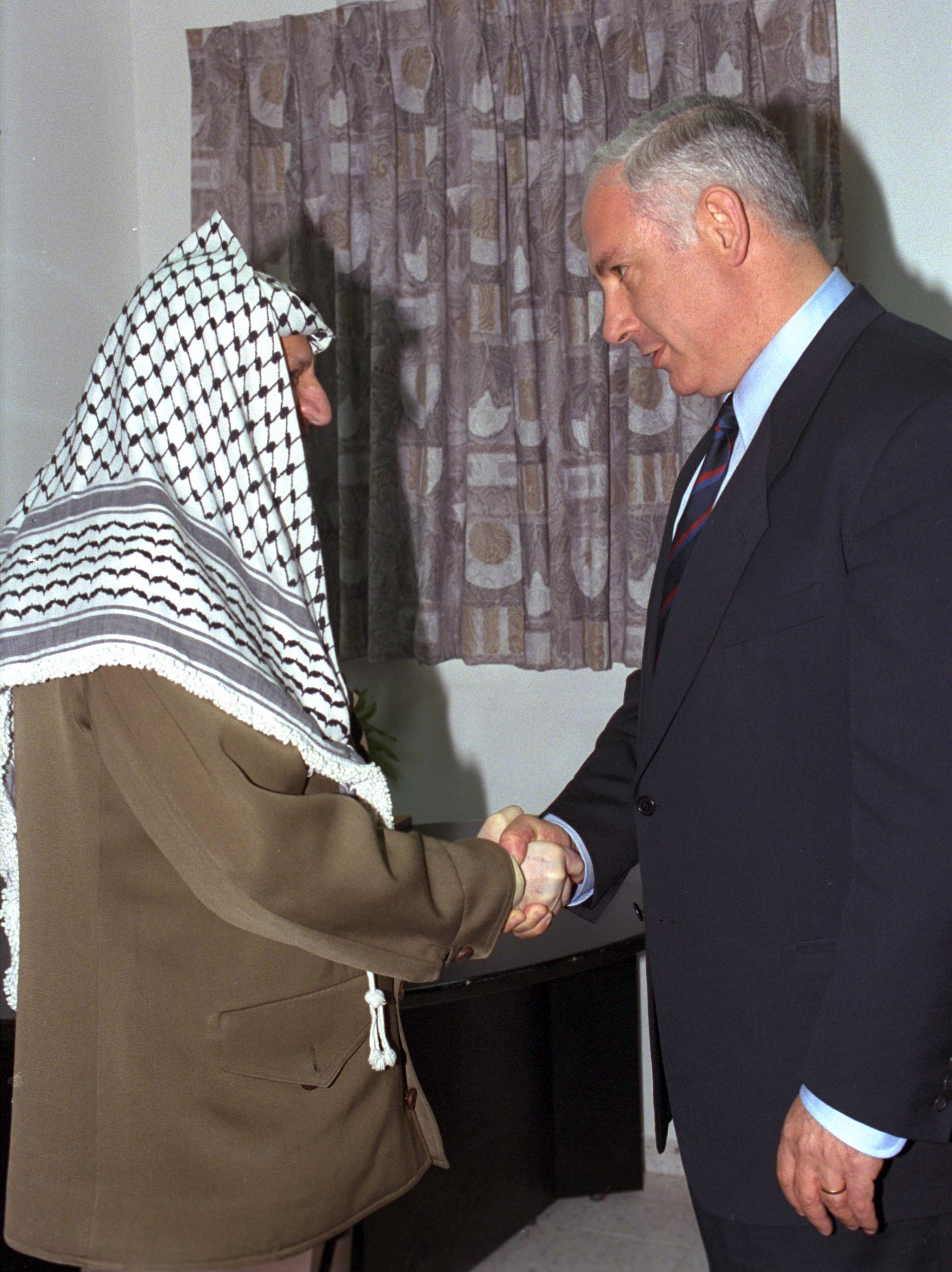
Netanyahu's first meeting with Palestinian president Yasser Arafat at the Erez Crossing, 4 September 1996

The months leading up to the 1996 Israeli election were marred by Hamas terrorist attacks in Israel. After the Shin Bet assassinated Hamas military leader Yahya Ayyash on 5 January 1996, Mohammed Deif, commander of the Qassam Brigades, organized a bombing campaign inside Israel as retaliation, including the Dizengoff Center suicide bombing and Jaffa Road bus bombings. It has been alleged that Syria and Iran had helped in their planning and financing. According to a report, Syrian Defense Minister Mustafa Tlass instructed Ghazi Kanaan to establish links between Hezbollah and Hamas fighters, who were then trained in Lebanon and Iran and participated in the retaliatory operations. Hamas operative Hassan Salameh, who planned three of the attacks, was trained in Iran.

According to Ronen Bergman, Deif's bombing campaign and the Israeli intelligence services failure to prevent it, was a factor that led to the defeat of Prime Minister Shimon Peres and the Israeli Labor Party in the 1996 Israeli general election and victory of the Likud party of Netanyahu, who opposed the Oslo Accords. Bergman writes that "after the election, the attacks stopped for almost a year. Some said this was because of Arafat's campaign against Hamas, and the arrest of many members of its military wing. Others believed that Hamas no longer had any reason to carry out suicide attacks, because Netanyahu had already almost completely stopped the peace process, which was the short-term goal of the attacks anyway."

Netanyahu first met Palestinian president Arafat on 4 September 1996. Prior to the meeting, they spoke by telephone. The meetings continued through Autumn 1996. On their first meeting, Netanyahu said: "I would like to emphasize that we have to take into account the needs and the requirements of both sides on the basis of reciprocity and the assurance of the security and well-being of both Israelis and Palestinian alike." Arafat said: "We are determined to work with Mr. Netanyahu and with his government." The talks culminated on 14 January 1997, in the signing of the Hebron Protocol.

In 1996, Netanyahu and Jerusalem's mayor Ehud Olmert decided to open an exit in the Muslim Quarter for the Western Wall Tunnel, which Peres had put on hold for the sake of peace. This sparked three days of rioting by Palestinians, resulting in dozens of Israelis and Palestinians being killed.

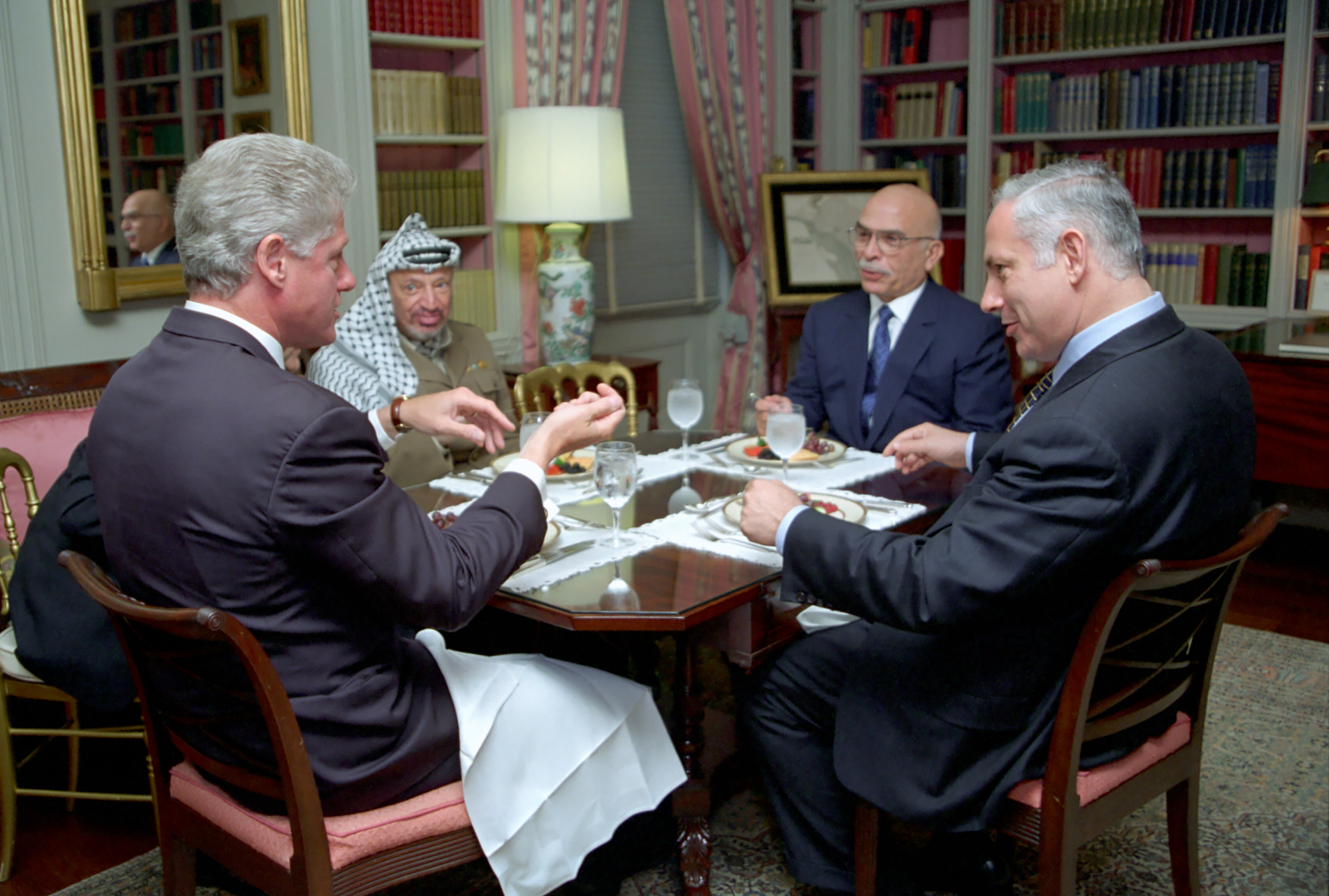
Netanyahu with President Bill Clinton, King Hussein of Jordan and Palestinian leader Yasser Arafat in October 1996

Lack of progress in the peace process led to new negotiations which produced the Wye River Memorandum in 1998, which detailed the steps to be taken by the Israeli government and Palestinian Authority to implement the Interim Agreement of 1995. It was signed by Netanyahu and Arafat, and on 17 November 1998, Israel's 120-member parliament, the Knesset, approved the Wye River Memorandum by 75–19. Netanyahu publicly emphasized a policy of "three no(s)": no withdrawal from the Golan Heights, no discussion of the status of Jerusalem, and no negotiations under preconditions.

Despite his public opposition to withdrawing from the Golan Heights, Netanyahu authorized American businessman and former diplomat Ronald Lauder to conduct secret negotiations with Syrian President Hafez al-Assad in the late 1990s. In an October 2026 interview with Haaretz, Lauder said that he had spent approximately 10 to 15 months traveling between Israel, Syria and Lebanon, working with Assad and Lebanese Prime Minister Rafic Hariri to develop a ten-point framework for a peace agreement. According to Lauder, Assad was prepared to sign the agreement and Netanyahu had accepted its terms, including an Israeli withdrawal from the Golan Heights. Lauder claimed that Netanyahu subsequently refused to sign unless Defense Minister Ariel Sharon endorsed the agreement, effectively ending the negotiations. Netanyahu has previously denied agreeing to relinquish the Golan Heights. Lauder said that Netanyahu had asked him to keep the negotiations confidential and that his refusal to finalize the agreement had permanently damaged their relationship.

In 1997 Ali Fallahian, the Iranian Intelligence Minister, authorized a Hamas bombing campaign to disrupt the peace process, and Hamas leader Khaled Mashal, picked Mahmoud Abu Hanoud, a bomb-maker in the West Bank, to construct the bombs, and sent suicide bombers to detonate them simultaneously in Jerusalem in the 30 July Mahane Yehuda market bombings and 4 September Ben Yehuda street bombings, killing 21 Israelis. In 1997, Netanyahu authorized a Mossad operation to assassinate Mashal in Jordan, just three years after the two countries had signed a peace treaty. The Mossad team, covering as five Canadian tourists, entered Jordan on 27 September and injected poison into Mashal's ears in a street in Amman. The plot was exposed and two agents were arrested by Jordanian police while three others hid in the Israeli embassy which was then surrounded by troops. An angry King Hussein demanded Israel to give the antidote and threatened to annul the peace treaty. Netanyahu relented after pressure by US President Bill Clinton and ordered the release of 61 Jordanian and Palestinian prisoners including Sheikh Ahmed Yassin. The incident sent the nascent Israeli-Jordanian relations plummeting.

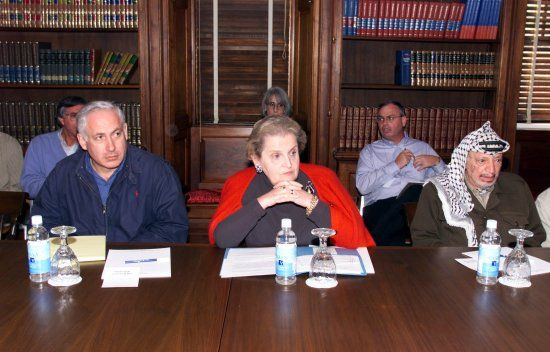
Netanyahu sitting with U.S. secretary of state Madeleine Albright and Palestinian president Yasser Arafat at the Wye River Memorandum, 1998

Mashal's antidote only secured the release of the two Mossad Kidon agents carrying out the assassination attempt. At least six other Mossad agents involved were holed up in the Israeli embassy. King Hussein would only release them if Israel released Ahmed Yassin and a large number of other Palestinian prisoners. Hussein needed the demands to be "enough to enable the king to be able to publicly defend the release of the hit team."

On the same day that Hamas bombed Ben Yehuda street, Hezbollah executed the Ansariya ambush on the IDF's naval special forces Shayetet 13, killing 12 Israeli commandos. On 25 May 1998, the remains and body parts of at least three soldiers who died in the Ansariya ambush were exchanged for 65 Lebanese prisoners and the bodies of 40 Hezbollah fighters and Lebanese soldiers captured by Israel. Netanyahu called it "one of the worst tragedies that has ever occurred to us".

Netanyahu began a process of economic liberalization, taking steps towards a free-market economy. The government began selling its shares in banks and state-run companies. Netanyahu eased Israel's strict foreign exchange controls, enabling Israelis to take an unrestricted amount of money out of the country, open foreign bank accounts, hold foreign currency, and invest freely in other countries.

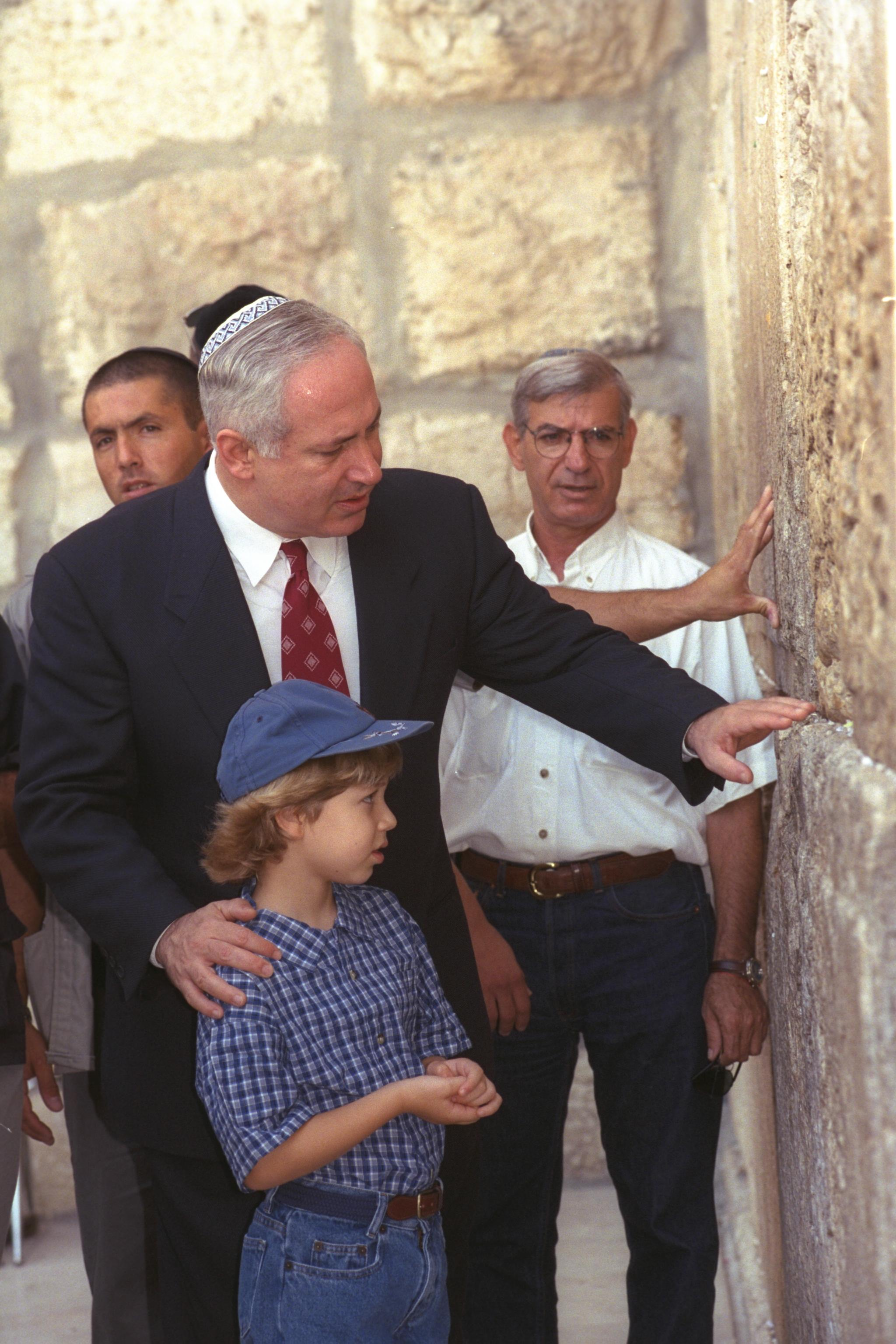
Netanyahu with his son Yair at the Western Wall in 1998

Netanyahu was opposed by the left and lost support from the right because of his concessions to the Palestinians in Hebron and elsewhere, and his negotiations with Arafat. Netanyahu lost favor with the public after a chain of scandals involving his marriage and corruption charges. In 1997, police recommended Netanyahu be indicted on corruption charges for influence-peddling. He was accused of appointing an attorney general who would reduce the charges but prosecutors ruled there was insufficient evidence to go to trial. In 1999, Netanyahu faced another scandal when the Israel Police recommended he be tried for corruption for $100,000 in free services from a government contractor; Israel's attorney general did not prosecute, citing difficulties with evidence. The Israeli failures against Hamas and Hezbollah under Netanyahu's first premiership, and the resulting release of imprisoned Palestinian and Lebanese leaders dealt a blow to Netanyahu's rhetoric of a "tough stance" towards enemies of Israel, and played a role in his defeat in the 1999 Israeli general election.

=== Political hiatus (1999–2003) ===
After being defeated by Ehud Barak in the 1999 Israeli prime ministerial election, Netanyahu temporarily retired from politics. He subsequently served as a senior consultant with Israeli communications equipment manufacturer BATM Advanced Communications for two years.

With the fall of the Barak government in late 2000, Netanyahu expressed his desire to return to politics. By law, Barak's resignation was supposed to lead to elections for the prime minister position only. Netanyahu insisted that general elections should be held, claiming that otherwise it would be impossible to have a stable government. Netanyahu decided eventually not to run for the prime minister position, a move which facilitated the rise to power of Ariel Sharon, who at the time was considered less popular than Netanyahu. In 2002, after the Israeli Labor Party left the coalition and vacated the position of foreign minister, Prime Minister Ariel Sharon appointed Netanyahu as foreign minister. Netanyahu challenged Sharon for the leadership of the Likud party in the 2002 Likud leadership election, but failed to oust him.

On 9 September 2002, a scheduled speech by Netanyahu at Concordia University in Montreal, Quebec, Canada was canceled after hundreds of pro-Palestinian protesters overwhelmed security and smashed through a window. Netanyahu was not present at the protest, having remained at his hotel throughout the duration. He later accused the activists of supporting terrorism and "mad zealotry". Weeks later in October around 200 protesters met Netanyahu outside his Heinz Hall appearance in Pittsburgh. Pittsburgh Police, Israeli security and a Pittsburgh SWAT unit allowed his speeches to continue downtown at the hall and the Duquesne Club as well as suburban Robert Morris University.

On 12 September 2002, Netanyahu lobbied for the invasion of Iraq, testifying under oath as a private citizen before the U.S. House of Representatives Government Reform Committee regarding the alleged nuclear threat posed by the Iraqi régime: "There is no question whatsoever that Saddam is seeking and is working and is advancing towards the development of nuclear weapons…" He also testified, "If you take out Saddam, Saddam's regime, I guarantee you that it will have enormous positive reverberations on the region."

=== Minister of Finance (2003–2005) ===
After the 2003 Israeli legislative election, in what many observers regarded as a surprise move, Sharon offered the Foreign Ministry to Silvan Shalom and offered Netanyahu the Finance Ministry. Some pundits speculated that Sharon made the move because he deemed Netanyahu a political threat given his demonstrated effectiveness as foreign minister, and that by placing him in the Finance Ministry during a time of economic uncertainty, he could diminish Netanyahu's popularity. Netanyahu accepted the new appointment. Sharon and Netanyahu came to an agreement that Netanyahu would have complete freedom as finance minister and have Sharon back all of his reforms, in exchange for Netanyahu's silence over Sharon's management of Israel's military and foreign affairs.

As finance minister, Netanyahu undertook an economic plan in order to restore Israel's economy from its low point during the Second Intifada. Netanyahu claimed that a bloated public sector and excessive regulations were largely responsible for stifling economic growth. His plan involved a move toward more liberalized markets, although it was not without its critics. He instituted a program to end welfare dependency by requiring people to apply for jobs or training, reduced the size of the public sector, froze government spending for three years, and capped the budget deficit at 1%. The taxation system was streamlined and taxes were cut, with the top individual tax rate reduced from 64% to 44% and the corporate tax rate from 36% to 18%. A host of state assets worth billions of dollars were privatized, including banks, oil refineries, the El Al national airline, and Zim Integrated Shipping Services. The retirement ages for both men and women were raised, and currency exchange laws were further liberalized. Commercial banks were forced to spin off their long-term savings. In addition, Netanyahu attacked monopolies and cartels to increase competition. As the Israeli economy started booming and unemployment fell significantly, Netanyahu was widely credited by commentators as having performed an 'economic miracle' by the end of his tenure.

However, opponents in the Labor party (and even a few within his own Likud) viewed Netanyahu's policies as "Thatcherite" attacks on the venerated Israeli social safety net. Ultimately, unemployment declined while economic growth soared, the debt-to-GDP ratio dropped to one of the lowest in the world, and foreign investment reached record highs.

Netanyahu threatened to resign from office in 2004 unless the Gaza pullout plan was put to a referendum. He later modified the ultimatum and voted for the program in the Knesset, indicating immediately thereafter that he would resign unless a referendum was held within 14 days. He submitted his resignation letter on 7 August 2005, shortly before the Israeli cabinet voted 17 to 5 to approve the initial phase of withdrawal from Gaza.

=== Leader of the Opposition (2006–2009) ===
Following the withdrawal of Sharon from the Likud, Netanyahu was one of several candidates who vied for the Likud leadership. His most recent attempt prior to this was in September 2005 when he had tried to hold early primaries for the position of the head of the Likud party, while the party held the office of prime minister – thus effectively pushing Ariel Sharon out of office. The party rejected this initiative. Netanyahu retook the leadership on 20 December 2005, with 47% of the primary vote, to 32% for Silvan Shalom and 15% for Moshe Feiglin. In the March 2006 Knesset elections, Likud took the third place behind Kadima and Labor and Netanyahu served as Leader of the Opposition. On 14 August 2007, Netanyahu was reelected as chairman of the Likud and its candidate for the post of prime minister with 73% of the vote, against far-right candidate Moshe Feiglin and World Likud chairman Danny Danon. He opposed the 2008 Israel–Hamas ceasefire, like others in the Knesset opposition. Specifically, Netanyahu said: "This is not a relaxation, it's an Israeli agreement to the rearming of Hamas ... What are we getting for this?"

Following Tzipi Livni's election to head Kadima and Olmert's resignation from the post of prime minister, Netanyahu declined to join the coalition Livni was trying to form and supported new elections, which were held in February 2009. Netanyahu was the Likud's candidate for prime minister in the 2009 Israeli legislative election which took place on 10 February 2009, as Livni, the previous designated acting prime minister under the Olmert government, had been unable to form a viable governing coalition. Opinion polls showed Likud in the lead, but with as many as a third of Israeli voters undecided.

In the election itself, Likud won the second highest number of seats, Livni's party having outnumbered the Likud by one seat. A possible explanation for Likud's relatively poor showing is that some Likud supporters defected to Avigdor Lieberman's Yisrael Beiteinu party. Netanyahu, however, claimed victory on the basis that right-wing parties won the majority of the vote, and on 20 February 2009, Netanyahu was designated by Israeli President Shimon Peres to succeed Ehud Olmert as prime minister, and began his negotiations to form a coalition government.

Despite right wing parties winning a majority of 65 seats in the Knesset, Netanyahu preferred a broader centrist coalition and turned to his Kadima rivals, chaired by Tzipi Livni, to join his government. This time it was Livni's turn to decline to join, with a difference of opinion on how to pursue the peace process being the stumbling block. Netanyahu did manage to entice a smaller rival, the Labor Party, chaired by Ehud Barak, to join his government, giving him a certain amount of centrist tone. Netanyahu presented his cabinet for a Knesset "Vote of Confidence" on 31 March 2009. The 32nd Government was approved that day by a majority of 69 lawmakers to 45 (with five abstaining) and the members were sworn in.

=== Prime Minister (2009–2021) ===
==== Second term ====
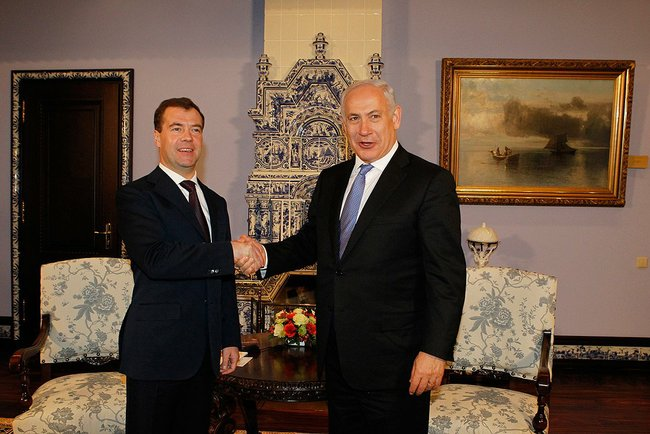
Netanyahu in a meeting with President Dmitry Medvedev in Russia, 24 March 2011

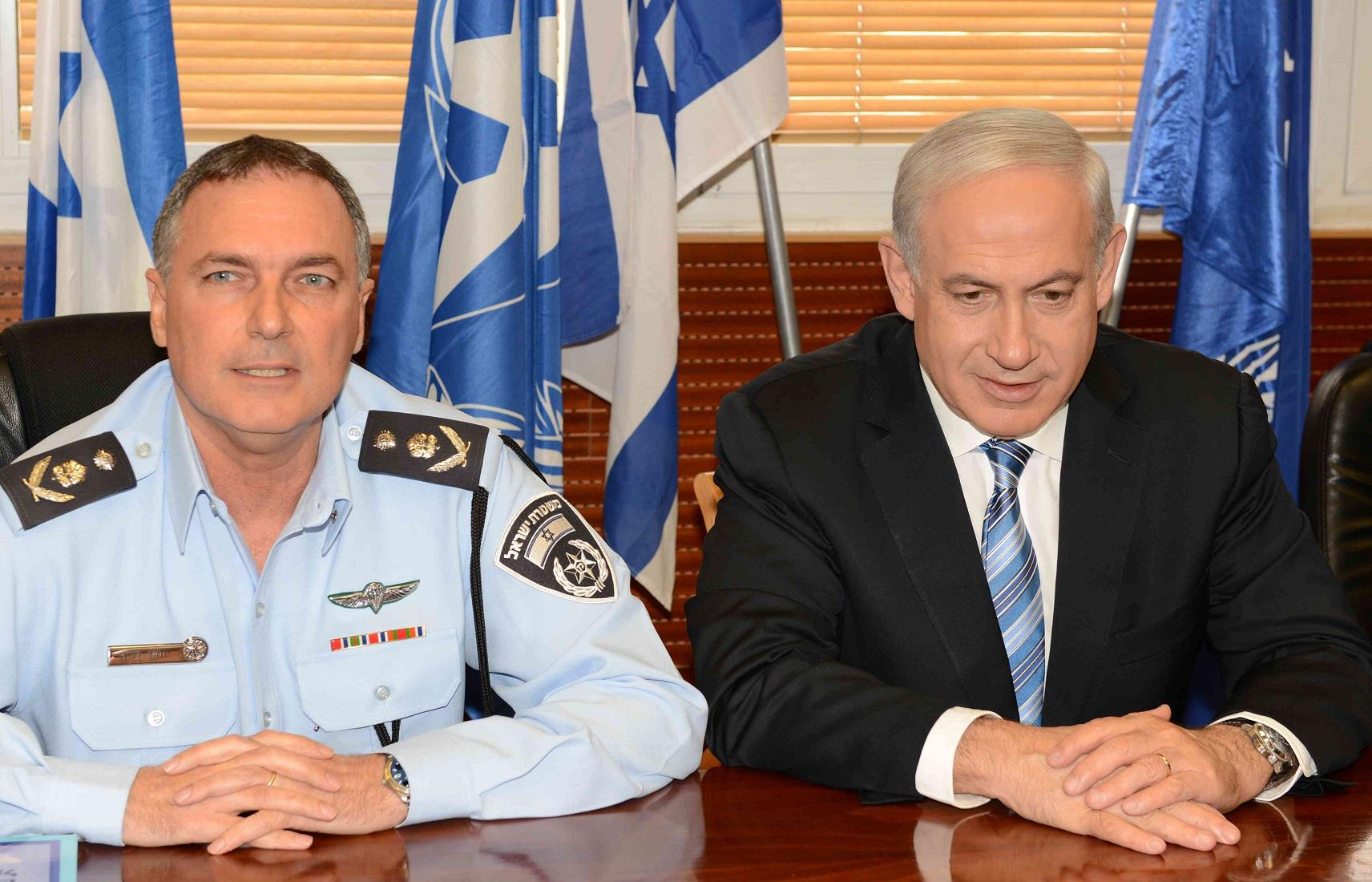
Netanyahu with Yohanan Danino, appointed Israel's chief of police in 2011

In 2009, US Secretary of State Hillary Clinton voiced support for the establishment of a Palestinian state – a solution not endorsed by Netanyahu, with whom she had pledged US cooperation. Netanyahu said negotiations with the Palestinians would be conditioned on them recognizing Israel as a Jewish state.

During Obama's 2009 Cairo speech Obama stated that the US, "does not accept the legitimacy of continued Israeli settlements." On 14 June, ten days after Obama's speech, Netanyahu gave a speech in which he endorsed a "Demilitarized Palestinian State". Netanyahu stated he would accept a Palestinian state if Jerusalem were to remain the united capital of Israel, the Palestinians would have no army, and give up their demand for a right of return. He argued the right for a "natural growth" in the existing Jewish settlements in the West Bank, while their permanent status was up for negotiation. He endorsed for the first time a Palestinian state alongside Israel. He stated he would be willing to meet with any "Arab leader" for negotiations without preconditions, mentioning Syria, Saudi Arabia, and Lebanon. The address represented a new position for Netanyahu's government.

Right-wing members of Netanyahu's coalition criticized his remarks for the creation of a Palestinian State, believing all the land should come under Israeli sovereignty. Opposition party Kadima leader Tzipi Livni opined that Netanyahu did not really believe in the two-state solution and that his speech was a response to international pressure. Netanyahu's speech provoked mixed reaction internationally. The Palestinian Authority rejected the conditions on a Palestinian State. Palestinian official Saeb Erekat said the speech had "closed the door to permanent status negotiations" due to Netanyahu's declarations on Jerusalem, refugees and settlements. Hamas said it was "racist" and called on Arab nations to "form stronger opposition". The Arab League dismissed the speech, declaring that "Arabs would not make concessions regarding issues of Jerusalem and refugees". The EU noted "...this is a step in the right direction. The acceptance of a Palestinian state was present there". Obama's press secretary said the speech was an "important step forward". Obama said "this solution can and must ensure both Israel's security and the Palestinians' legitimate aspirations for a viable state". France praised the speech and called on Israel to cease building settlements in the West Bank.

Three months after starting his term, Netanyahu remarked that his cabinet had established a working national unity government, and broad consensus for a "two-state solution". A July 2009 survey found most Israelis supported the government, giving Netanyahu an approval rating of 49 percent. Netanyahu lifted checkpoints in the West Bank to allow free movement and flow of imports; which resulted in an economic boost. In 2009, Netanyahu welcomed the Arab Peace initiative and lauded a call by Bahrain's Crown Prince to normalize relations with Israel.

In August 2009 Netanyahu said: "We want...recognition of Israel as the national state of the Jewish people and...a security settlement". Palestinian Authority chairman Mahmoud Abbas declared he would be willing to meet with Netanyahu at the UN General Assembly, where Netanyahu had accepted Obama's invitation for a "triple summit". Netanyahu was reported to be in a pivotal moment, thinking about a compromise over permission on continuing the already approved construction in the West Bank, in exchange for freezing all settlements thereafter, as well as continuing building in East Jerusalem, and stopping demolition of Arab houses there. In September, it was reported Netanyahu was to agree to settlers' political demands to approve more settlement constructions before a temporary settlement freeze agreement took place. White House spokesman Robert Gibbs expressed regret over the move.

On 7 September, Netanyahu left his office without reporting his destination. His military secretary reported Netanyahu had visited a security facility in Israel. On 9 September, Yedioth Ahronoth reported that he had made a secret flight to Moscow to try to persuade Russian officials not to sell S-300 anti-aircraft missile systems to Iran. Headlines branded Netanyahu a "liar" and dubbed the affair a "fiasco". The military secretary was reportedly dismissed. The Sunday Times reported that the trip was made to share the names of Russian scientists Israel believed were abetting Iran's nuclear weapons program.

On 24 September 2009, in an address to the UN General Assembly, Netanyahu said Iran posed a threat to world peace and it was incumbent on the UN to prevent it from obtaining nuclear weapons. Waving the blueprints for Auschwitz and invoking the memory of his family members murdered by the Nazis, Netanyahu delivered a riposte to Iranian president Mahmoud Ahmadinejad's questioning of the Holocaust, asking: "Have you no shame?"

In response to pressure from the Obama administration urging the resumption of peace talks, on 25 November Netanyahu announced a partial 10-month settlement construction freeze. It had no significant effect on actual settlement construction. U.S. special envoy George J. Mitchell said, "while the United States shares Arab concerns about the limitations of Israel's gesture, it is more than any Israeli government has ever done". Netanyahu called the move "a painful step that will encourage the peace process" and urged the Palestinians to respond. The Palestinians rejected the call, stating the gesture was "insignificant" in that thousands of approved settlement buildings in the West Bank would continue to be built and there would be no freeze of settlement activity in East Jerusalem.

In March 2010, Israel's government approved construction of an additional 1,600 apartments in a Jewish housing development in northeast Jerusalem called Ramat Shlomo despite the US position that such acts thwart peace talks. Israel's announcement occurred during a visit by U.S. Vice President Joe Biden and the US publicly condemned the plan. Netanyahu issued a statement that all previous Israeli governments had continuously permitted construction in the neighborhood, and certain neighborhoods had always been included as part of Israel in any final agreement plan proposed by either side. Netanyahu regretted the timing of the announcement but asserted that "our policy on Jerusalem is the same policy followed by all Israeli governments for the 42 years...it has not changed."

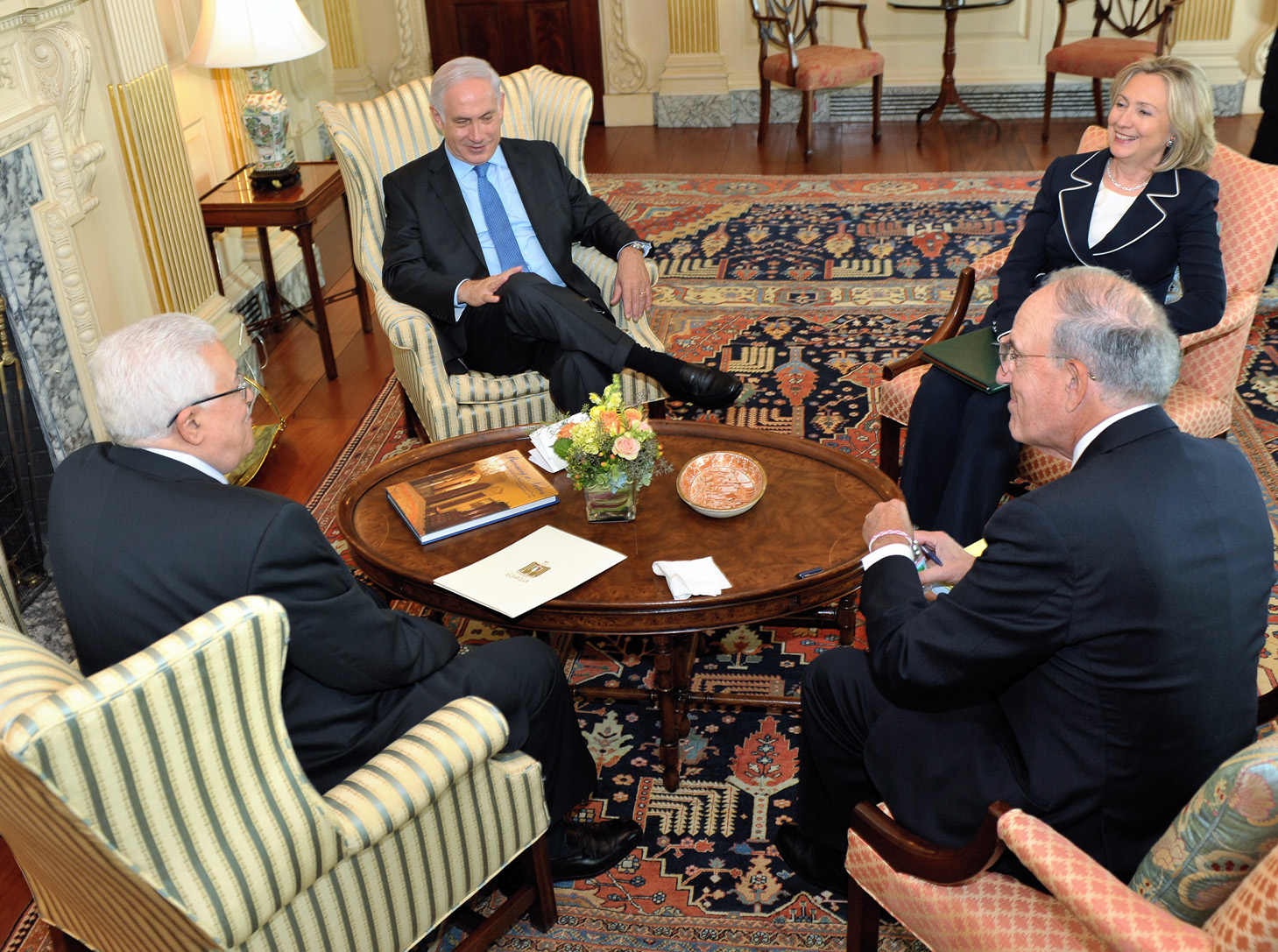
Netanyahu, Hillary Clinton, George J. Mitchell and Mahmoud Abbas at the start of the direct talks, 2 September 2010

In September 2010, Netanyahu agreed to enter direct talks, mediated by the Obama administration, with the Palestinians. The aim was a "final status settlement" to the Israeli–Palestinian conflict by forming a two-state solution for the Jewish and Palestinian people. On 27 September, the 10-month settlement freeze ended, and the Israeli government approved new construction in the West Bank, including East Jerusalem. On retirement in 2011, US Defense Secretary Robert Gates said Netanyahu was ungrateful to the US and endangering Israel. The Likud party defended Netanyahu by saying most Israelis supported him and he had broad support in the US. In 2012, Netanyahu officially recognized for the first time the right for Palestinians to have their own state in an official document, a letter to Mahmoud Abbas, though as before he declared it would have to be demilitarized.

Netanyahu unsuccessfully called for the early release of Jonathan Pollard, an American serving a life sentence for passing secret US documents to Israel in 1987. He raised the issue at the Wye River Summit in 1998, where he claimed president Bill Clinton had privately agreed to release Pollard. In 2002, Netanyahu visited Pollard at his North Carolina prison. Netanyahu maintained contact with Pollard's wife, and pressed the Obama administration to release Pollard.

2011 Israeli social justice protests saw hundreds of thousands protest Israel's high cost of living. Netanyahu appointed the Trajtenberg Committee and it submitted recommendations to lower living costs. Although Netanyahu promised to push the proposed reforms through cabinet in one piece, differences inside his coalition resulted in gradual adoption.

Netanyahu's cabinet approved a plan to build a fiber-optic cable network to bring cheap, high-speed fiber-optic Internet access to every home.

In 2012, Netanyahu planned to call early elections, but oversaw the creation of a government of national unity to see Israel through until the 2013 elections. In October 2012, Netanyahu and Foreign Minister Avigdor Lieberman announced that their parties, Likud and Yisrael Beiteinu, had merged and would run together on a single ballot in Israel's 2013 elections.

==== Third term ====
The 2013 election returned Netanyahu's Likud Beiteinu coalition with 11 fewer seats than the combined Likud and Yisrael Beiteinu parties had going into the vote. Israeli president Shimon Peres charged Netanyahu with the task of forming the Thirty-third government of Israel. During Netanyahu's third term, he continued his policy of economic liberalization. In December 2013, the Knesset approved the Business Concentration Law, which intended to open Israel's highly concentrated economy to competition to lower consumer prices, reduce income inequality, and increase economic growth. Netanyahu had formed the Concentration Committee in 2010, and the bill, which was pushed forward by his government, implemented its recommendations. The new law banned multi-tiered corporate holding structures, in which a CEO's family members or other affiliated individuals held public companies which in turn owned other public companies, and who were thus able to engage in price gouging. Under the law, corporations were banned from owning more than two tiers of publicly listed companies and from holding both financial and non-financial enterprises. All conglomerates were given four to six years to sell excess holdings. Netanyahu also began a campaign of port privatization to break what he viewed as the monopoly held by workers of the Israel Port Authority, so as to lower consumer prices and increase exports. In July 2013, he issued tenders for the construction of private ports in Haifa and Ashdod. Netanyahu has also pledged to curb excess bureaucracy and regulations to ease the burden on industry.

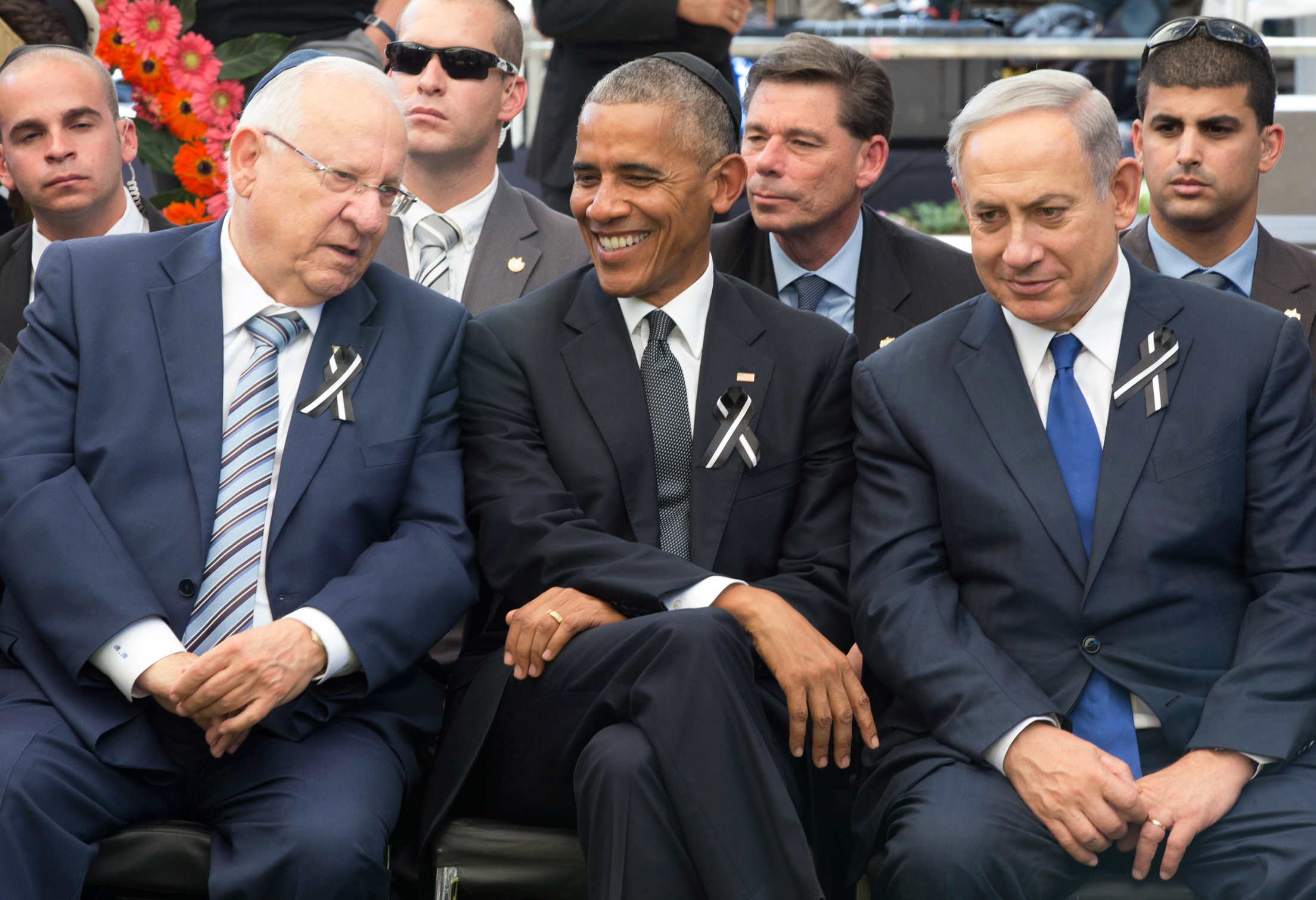
Netanyahu, U.S. president Barack Obama and Israeli president Reuven Rivlin at the funeral of former Israeli president Shimon Peres, Jerusalem, 30 September 2016

In April and June 2014, Netanyahu spoke of his deep concerns when Hamas and the Palestinian Authority agreed and then formed a unity government, and was severely critical of both the United States and European governments' decision to work with the Palestinian coalition government. He blamed Hamas for the kidnapping and murder of three Israeli teenagers in June 2014, and launched a massive search and arrest operation on the West Bank, targeting members of Hamas in particular, and over the following weeks hit 60 targets in Gaza. Missile and rocket exchanges between Gaza militants and the IDF escalated after the bodies of the teenagers, who had been killed almost immediately as the government had good reasons to suspect, were discovered on 30 June 2014. After several Hamas operatives were killed, Hamas officially declared it would launch rockets from Gaza into Israel, and Israel started Operation Protective Edge in the Gaza Strip, formally ending the November 2012 ceasefire agreement. The prime minister did a round of television shows in the United States and described Hamas as "genocidal terrorists" in an interview on CNN. When asked if Gazan casualties from the operation might spark "a third intifada", Netanyahu replied that Hamas was working towards that goal.

In October 2014, Netanyahu's government approved a privatization plan to reduce corruption and politicization in government companies, and strengthen Israel's capital market. Under the plan, minority stakes of up to 49% in state-owned companies, including arms manufacturers, energy, postal, water, and railway companies, as well as the ports of Haifa and Ashdod. That same month, Netanyahu called criticism of settlements "against the American values", which earned him rebuke from the White House Press Secretary Josh Earnest, who said that American values had resulted in Israel receiving consistent funding and protective technology such as Iron Dome. Netanyahu explained that he does not accept residency restrictions for Jews, and said that Jerusalem's Arabs and Jews should be able to buy homes wherever they want. He said he was "baffled" by the American condemnation. "It's against the American values. And it doesn't bode well for peace. The idea that we'd have this ethnic purification as a condition for peace, I think it's anti-peace." Later, Jeffrey Goldberg of The Atlantic reported that the relationship between Netanyahu and the White House had reached a new low, with the U.S. administration angry over Israel's settlement policies, and Netanyahu expressing contempt for the American administration's grasp of the Middle East.

On 2 December 2014, Netanyahu fired ministers Yair Lapid, head of Yesh Atid, and Tzipi Livni, head of Hatnua. The changes led to the dissolution of the government, with new elections on 17 March 2015.

Benjamin Netanyahu's 2015 address to the United States Congress marked Netanyahu's third speech to a joint session of Congress. The day before announcing he would address Congress, Time reported that he tried to derail a meeting between U.S. lawmakers and the head of Mossad, Tamir Pardo, who intended warning them against imposing further sanctions against Iran, a move that might derail nuclear talks. Leading up to the speech, Israeli consuls general in the United States "expect[ed] fierce negative reaction from U.S. Jewish communities and Israel's allies". Objections included the arrangement of the speech without the support and engagement of the Obama administration and the timing of the speech before Israel's March 2015 election. Seven American Jewish lawmakers met with Ron Dermer, Israel's ambassador to the U.S. and recommended that Netanyahu instead meet with lawmakers privately to discuss Iran. In making the speech, Netanyahu claimed to speak for all Jews worldwide, a claim disputed by others in the Jewish community.

As election day approached in what was perceived to be a close race in the 2015 Israeli elections, Netanyahu answered 'indeed' when asked whether a Palestinian state would not be established in his term. He said that support of a Palestinian state is tantamount to yielding territory for radical Islamic terrorists to attack Israel. However, Netanyahu reiterated "I don't want a one-state solution. I want a peaceful, sustainable two-state solution. I have not changed my policy."

==== Fourth term ====
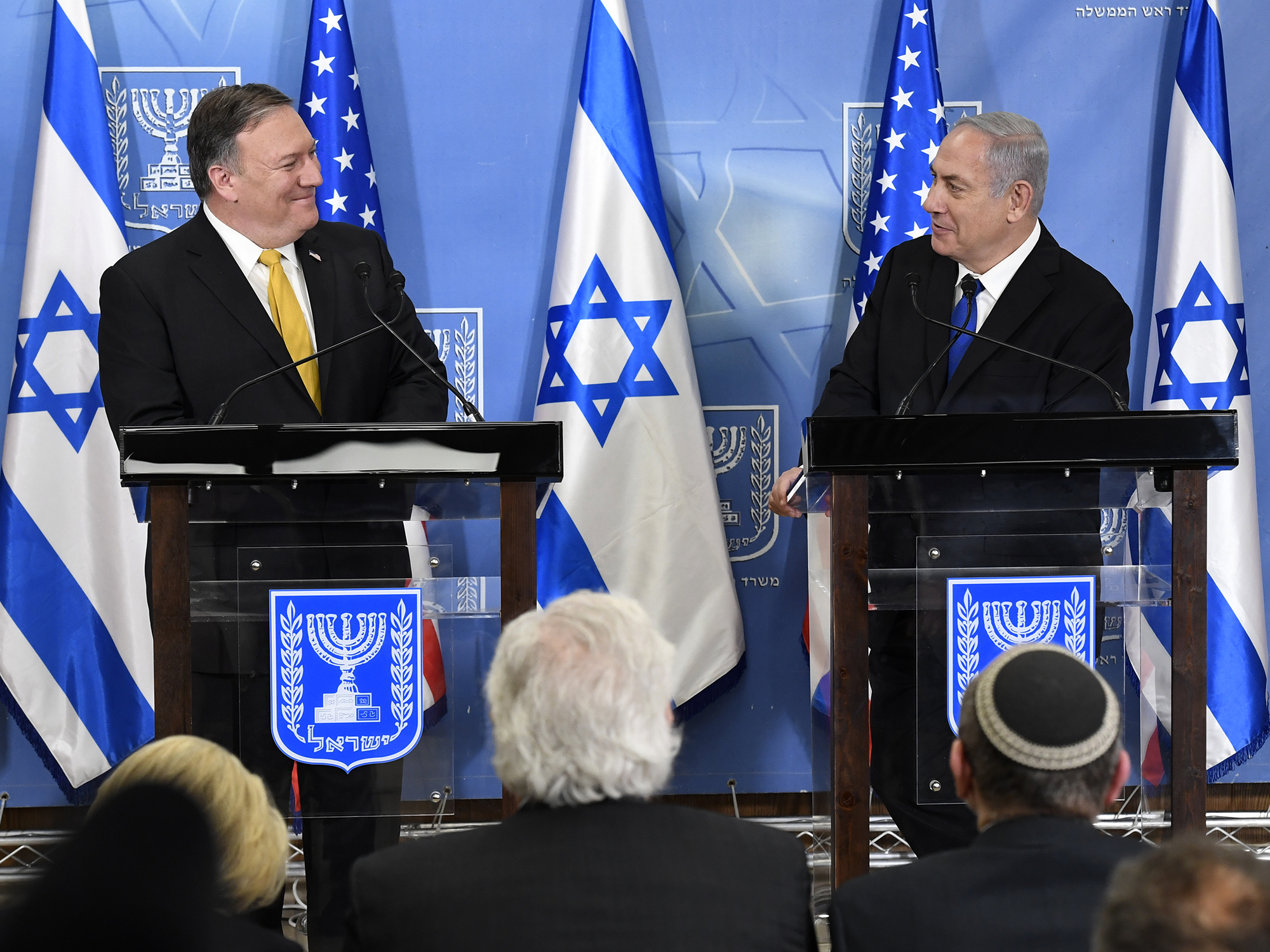
Netanyahu and US secretary of state Mike Pompeo

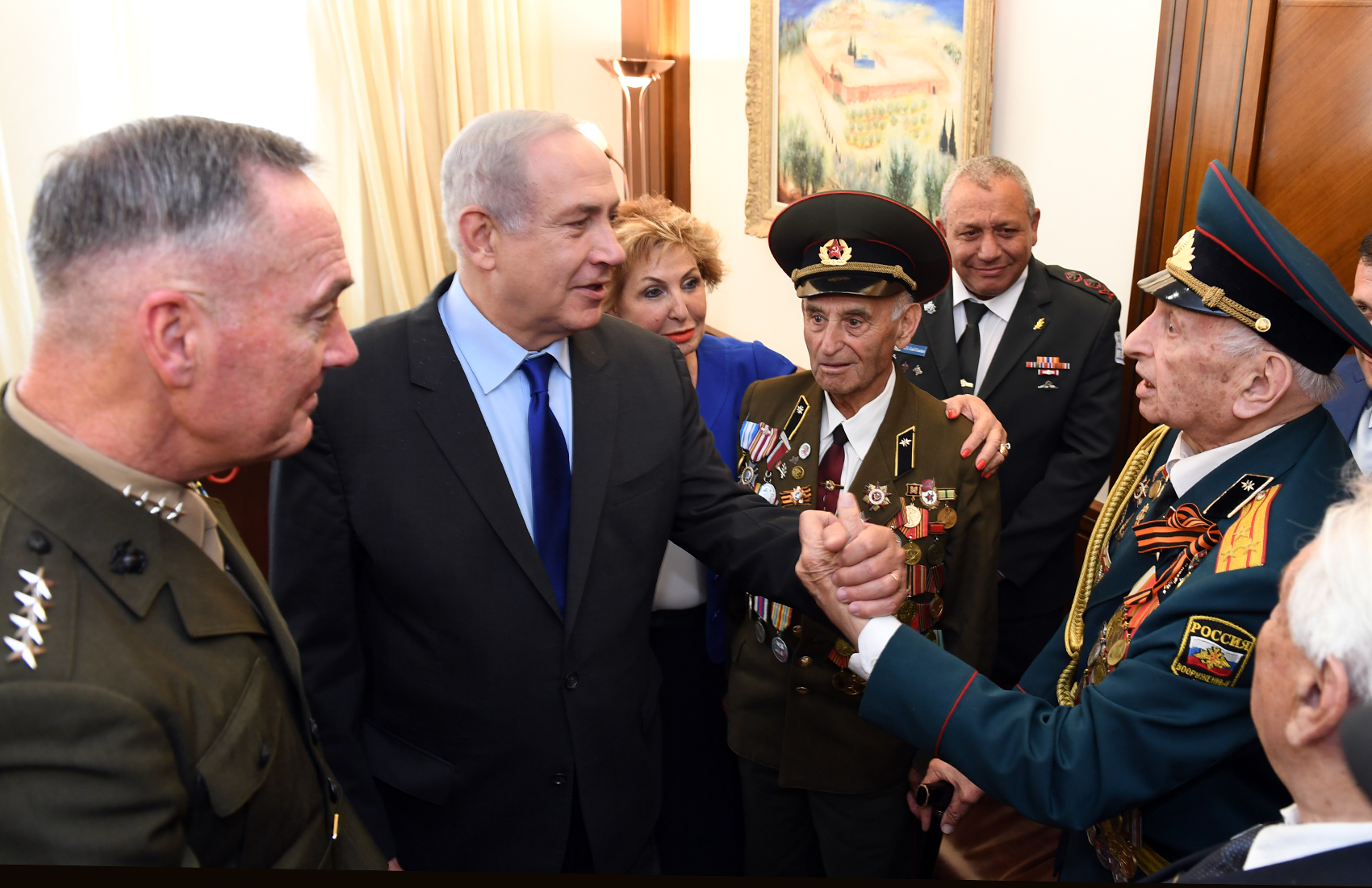
Netanyahu, Joseph Dunford and Jewish veterans of the Red Army, Victory Day in Jerusalem, 9 May 2017

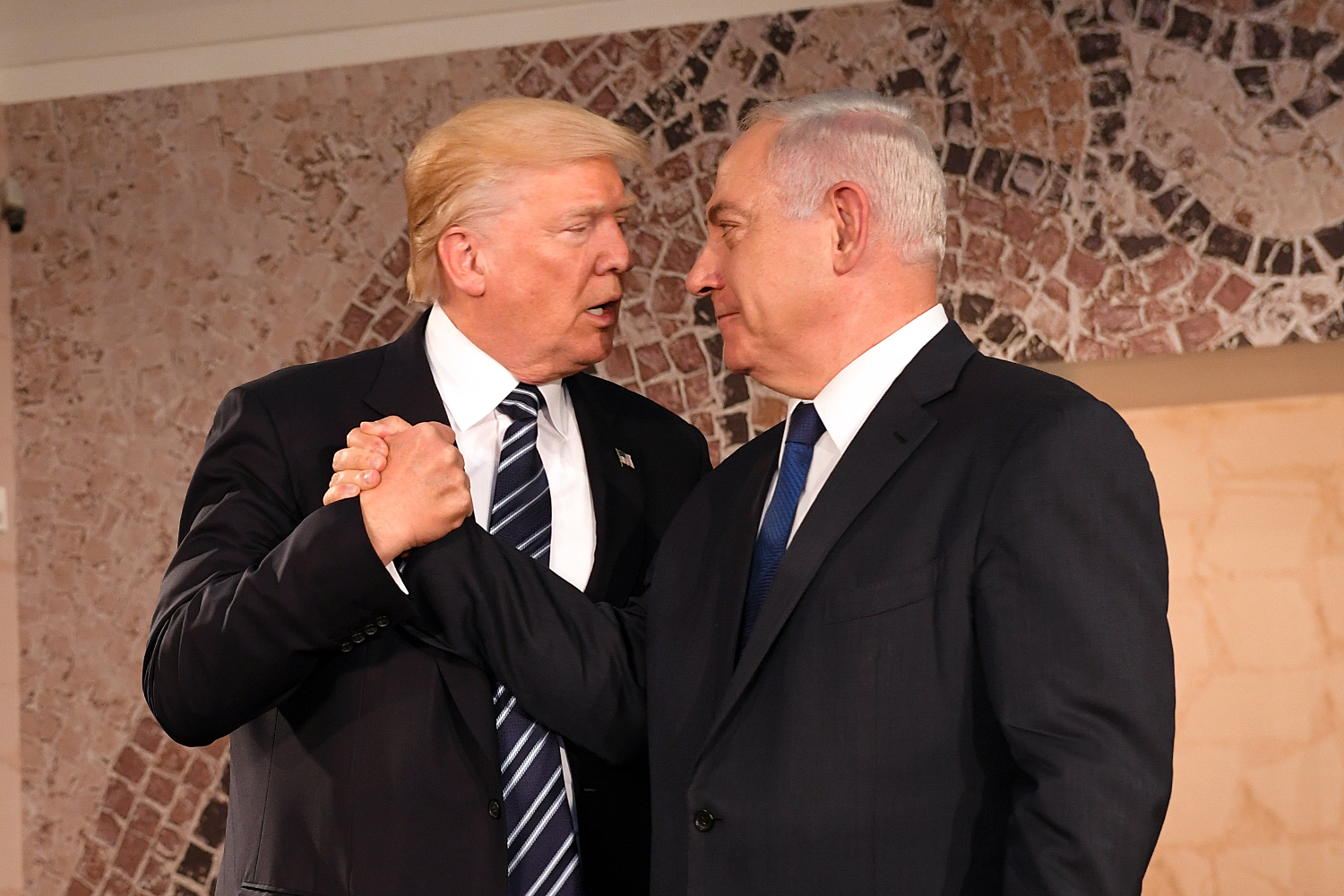
Netanyahu meets with President Donald Trump in Jerusalem, May 2017.

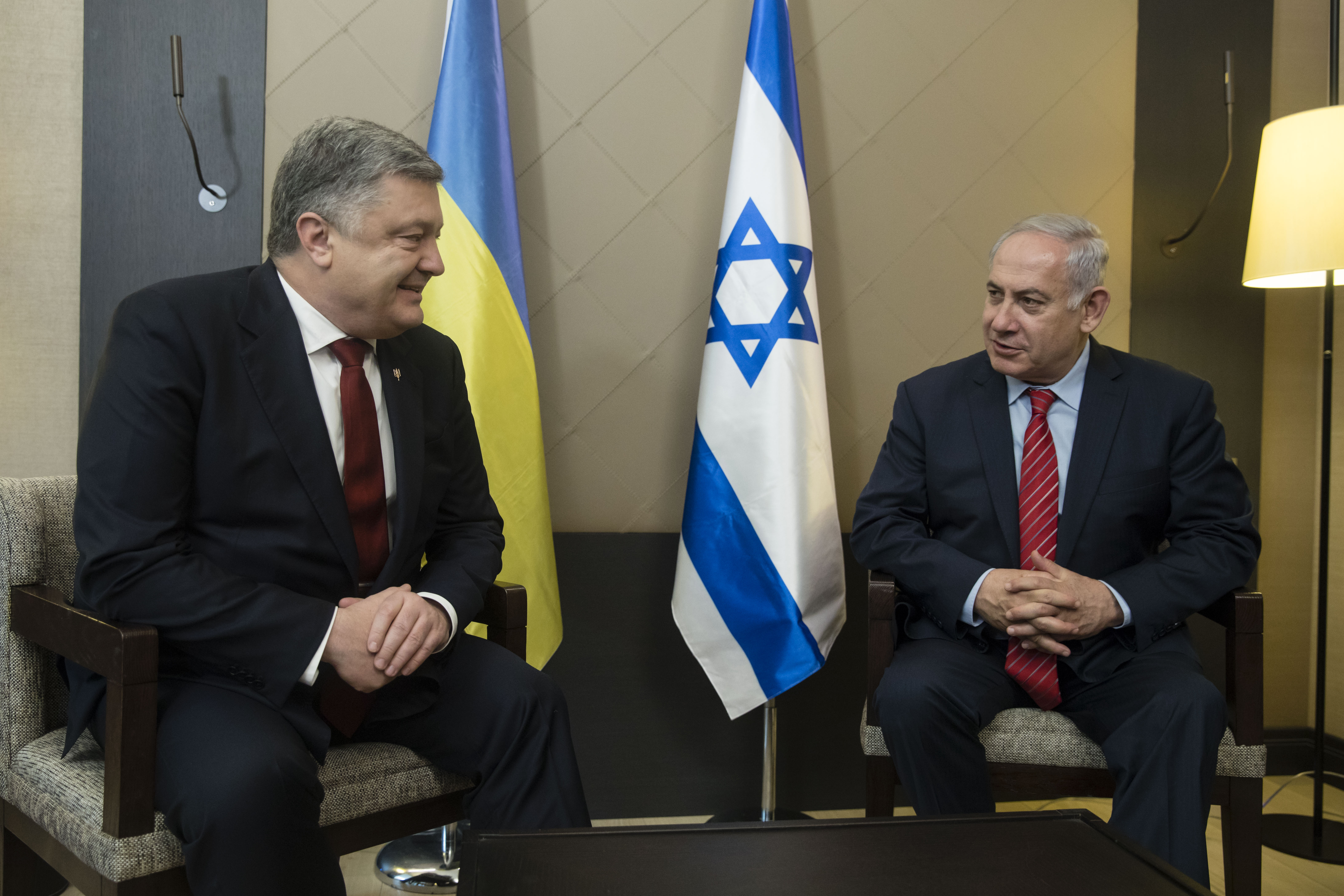
Netanyahu meets with Ukrainian president Petro Poroshenko, 24 January 2018.

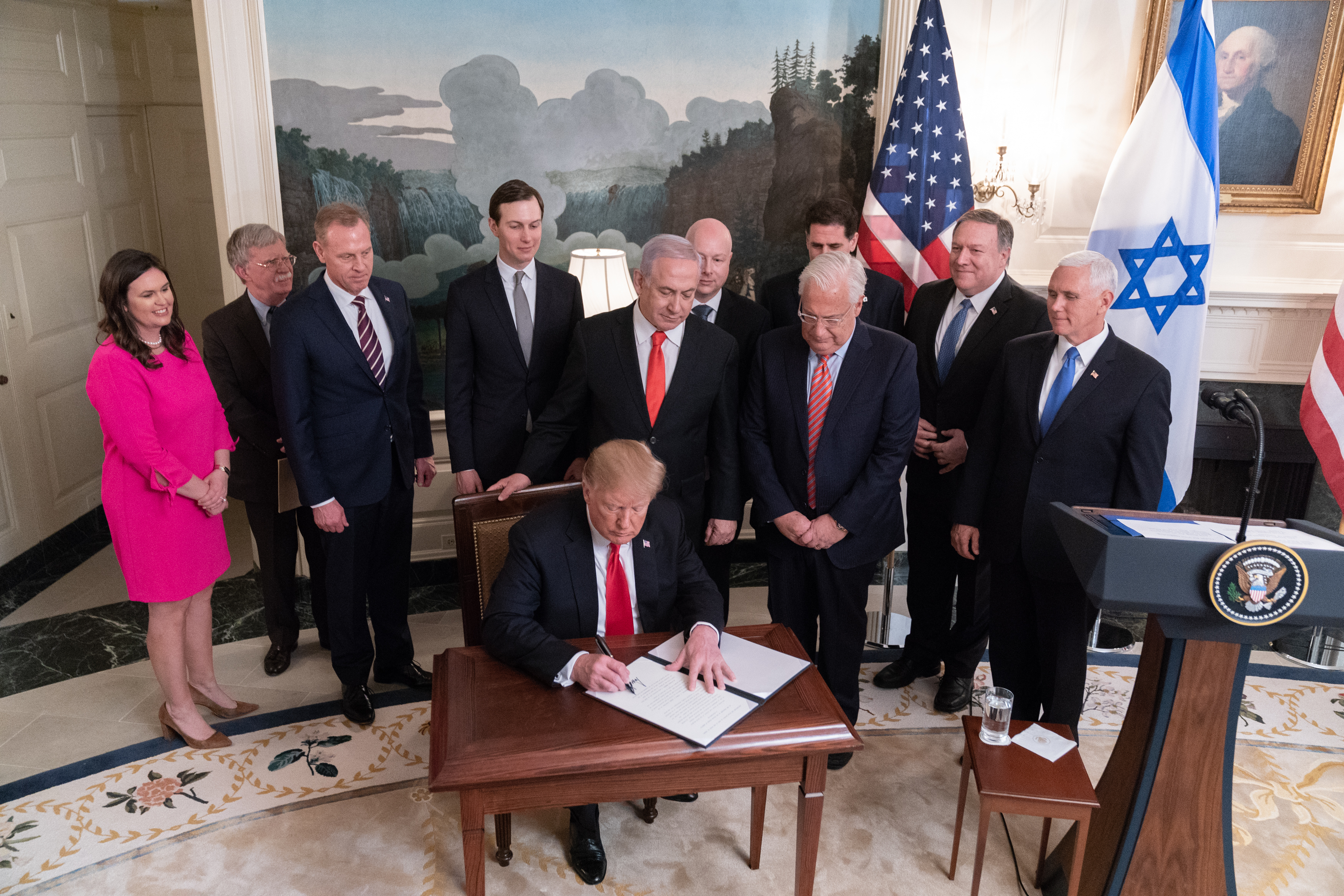
President Trump, joined by Netanyahu behind, signs the proclamation recognizing Israel's 1981 annexation of the Golan Heights, March 2019.

In the 2015 election, Netanyahu returned with his party Likud leading the elections with 30 mandates, making it the single highest number of seats for the Knesset. President Rivlin granted Netanyahu an extension until 6 May 2015 to build a coalition when one had not been finalized in the first four weeks of negotiations. He formed a coalition government within two hours of the midnight 6 May deadline. His Likud party formed the coalition with Jewish Home, United Torah Judaism, Kulanu, and Shas.

In August 2015, Netanyahu's government approved a two-year budget that would see agricultural reforms and lowering of import duties to reduce food prices, deregulation of the approval process in construction to lower housing costs and speed up infrastructure building, and reforms in the financial sector to boost competition and lower fees for financial services. In the end, the government was forced to compromise by removing some key agricultural reforms.

In October 2015, Netanyahu caused commotion for saying the Grand Mufti of Jerusalem, Haj Amin al-Husseini gave Adolf Hitler the idea of exterminating Jews rather than expelling them during the Second World War. This claim is dismissed by most historians, who say that al-Husseini's meeting with Hitler took place approximately five months after the mass murder of Jews began. Some of the strongest criticism came from Israeli academics: Yehuda Bauer said Netanyahu's claim was "completely idiotic". Moshe Zimmermann stated that "any attempt to deflect the burden from Hitler to others is a form of Holocaust denial."

In March 2016, Netanyahu's coalition faced a potential crisis as ultra-Orthodox members threatened to withdraw over the government's proposed steps to create non-Orthodox prayer space at the Western Wall. They have stated they will leave the coalition if the government offers any further official state recognition of Conservative and Reform Judaism.

On 23 December 2016, the United States, under the Obama Administration, abstained from United Nations Security Council Resolution 2334, effectively allowing it to pass. On 28 December, U.S. Secretary of State John Kerry strongly criticized Israel and its settlement policies in a speech. Netanyahu strongly criticized both the UN Resolution and Kerry's speech in response. On 6 January 2017, the Israeli government withdrew its annual dues from the organization, which totaled $6 million in United States dollars.

In February 2017, Netanyahu became the first serving prime minister of Israel to visit Australia. He was accompanied by his wife, Sara. The three-day official visit included a delegation of business representatives, and Netanyahu and Prime Minister of Australia Malcolm Turnbull were scheduled to sign several bilateral agreements. Netanyahu recalled that it was the Australian Light Horse regiments that liberated Beersheba during World War I, and this began what has been a relationship of 100 years between the countries.

In October 2017, shortly after the US announced the same action, Netanyahu's government announced it was leaving UNESCO due to what it saw as anti-Israel actions by the agency, and it made that decision official in December 2017. The Israeli government officially notified UNESCO of the withdrawal in late December 2017.

In April 2018, Netanyahu accused Iran of not holding up its end of the Iran nuclear deal after presenting a cache of over 100,000 documents detailing the extent of Iran's nuclear program. Iran denounced Netanyahu's presentation as "propaganda".

Netanyahu praised the 2018 North Korea–United States Singapore Summit. He said in a statement, "I commend US President Donald Trump on the historic summit in Singapore. This is an important step in the effort to rid the Korean peninsula of nuclear weapons."

In July 2018, the Knesset passed the Nation-State Bill, a Basic Law supported by Netanyahu's coalition government. Analysts saw the bill as a sign of Netanyahu's coalition advancing a right-wing agenda.

Prior to the April 2019 Israeli legislative election, Netanyahu helped broker a deal that united the Jewish Home party with the far-right Otzma Yehudit party, in order to form the Union of the Right-Wing Parties. The motivation of the deal was to overcome the electoral threshold for smaller parties. The deal was criticized in the media, as Otzma is widely characterized as racist and traces its origins to the extremist Kahanist movement.

===== Criminal investigations and indictment =====
Since January 2017, Netanyahu has been investigated by Israeli police in two connected cases, "Case 1000" and "Case 2000". In Case 1000, Netanyahu is suspected of having obtained inappropriate favors from businessmen, including James Packer and Hollywood producer Arnon Milchan. Case 2000 involves alleged attempts to strike a deal with the publisher of the Yedioth Ahronot newspaper group, Arnon Mozes, to promote legislation to weaken Yedioth's main competitor in exchange for more favorable political coverage.

In August 2017, Israeli police confirmed that Netanyahu was suspected of crimes involving fraud, breach of trust, and bribes in the two cases. The next day, it was reported that the prime minister's former chief of staff, Ari Harow, had signed a deal with prosecutors to testify against Netanyahu.

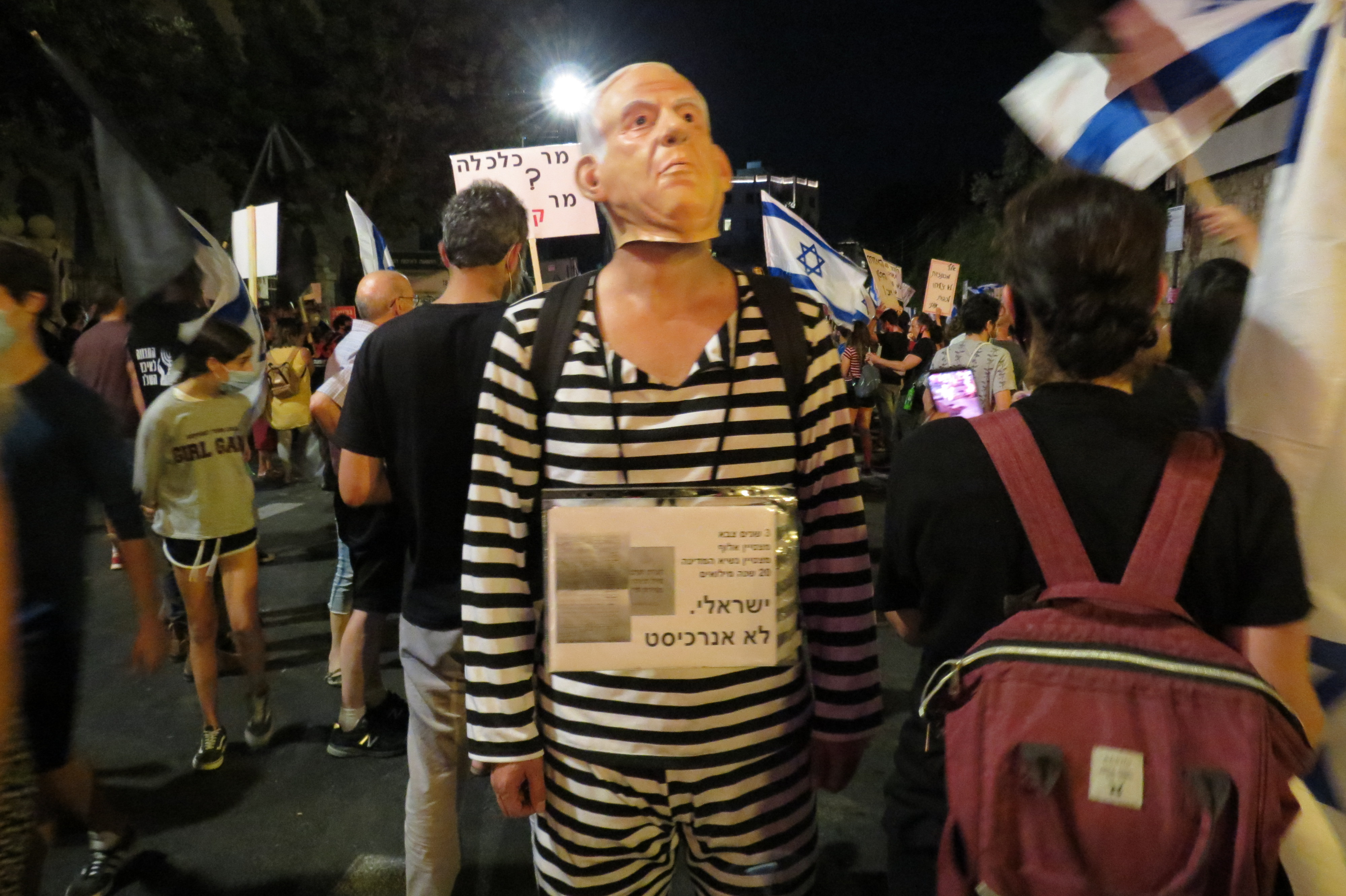
Israelis protest against Netanyahu outside his official residence in Jerusalem on 30 July 2020

In February 2018, Israeli police recommended that Netanyahu be charged with corruption. According to a police statement, sufficient evidence exists to indict the prime minister on charges of bribery, fraud, and breach of trust in the two cases. Netanyahu responded that the allegations were baseless and that he would continue as prime minister. In November 2018, it was reported that Economic Crimes Division Director Liat Ben-Ari recommended indictment for both cases.

In 2018 Netanyahu was also investigated in "Case 4000", where he was suspected of giving regulatory favors to Shaul Elovitch, owner of Bezeq telecommunication company, in exchange for positive publications in news website Walla!.

In February 2019, the Israeli attorney general announced his intent to file indictments against Netanyahu on bribe and fraud charges in the three cases. Netanyahu was formally indicted on 21 November 2019. If convicted, he could face up to 10 years in prison for bribery and a maximum of three years for fraud and breach of trust. He is the first sitting prime minister in Israel's history to be charged with a crime. On 23 November 2019, it was announced that Netanyahu, in compliance with legal precedent set by the Israeli Supreme Court in 1993, would relinquish his agriculture, health, social affairs and diaspora affairs portfolios. The matter of forcing a prime minister to resign due to an indictment has yet to be tested in court. He was officially charged on 28 January 2020.

Netanyahu's criminal trial was set to begin on 24 May 2020, having been initially scheduled for March of that year but delayed due to the COVID-19 pandemic. As of April 2023, the criminal trial was still ongoing.

On 30 November 2025, Netanyahu formally asked for a pardon from president Isaac Herzog.

In February 2026, the Attorney General and Cabinet Legal Advisor of Israel summoned Netanyahu to provide explanations to the police regarding an investigation into the leak of classified documents to the German newspaper Bild. The case reportedly concerns attempts to obstruct investigations into the leak of sensitive Israeli documents. Previously, Netanyahu's chief of staff, Tzachi Braverman, was arrested on suspicion of attempting to impede the investigative process regarding the leak to foreign media.

==== Fifth term ====
On 17 May 2020, Netanyahu was sworn in for a fifth term as prime minister in a coalition with Benny Gantz. Against a background of the COVID-19 pandemic in Israel and Netanyahu's criminal trial, protests broke out against him in front of the prime minister's residence. Following this, Netanyahu ordered to disperse the demonstrations using COVID-19 special regulations, limiting them to 20 people and at a distance of 1,000 meters from their homes. However, the exact opposite was achieved; the demonstrations were enlarged and dispersed to over 1,000 centers. By March 2021, Israel became the country with the highest vaccinated population per capita in the world against COVID-19.

After tensions escalated in Jerusalem in May 2021, Hamas fired rockets on Israel from Gaza, which prompted Netanyahu to initiate Operation Guardian of the Walls, lasting eleven days. After the operation, Israeli politician and leader of the Yamina alliance Naftali Bennett announced that he had agreed to a deal with Leader of the Opposition Yair Lapid to form a rotation government that would oust Netanyahu from his position as prime minister. On 13 June 2021, Bennett and Lapid formed a coalition government, and Netanyahu was ousted as prime minister, ending his 12-year tenure.

=== Leader of the Opposition (2021–2022) ===
After the end of his second premiership, Netanyahu began his third stint as the leader of the opposition. Likud remained the largest party in the twenty-fourth Knesset. He led the opposition into the 2022 Israeli legislative election.

=== Prime Minister (2022–present) ===
==== Sixth term ====
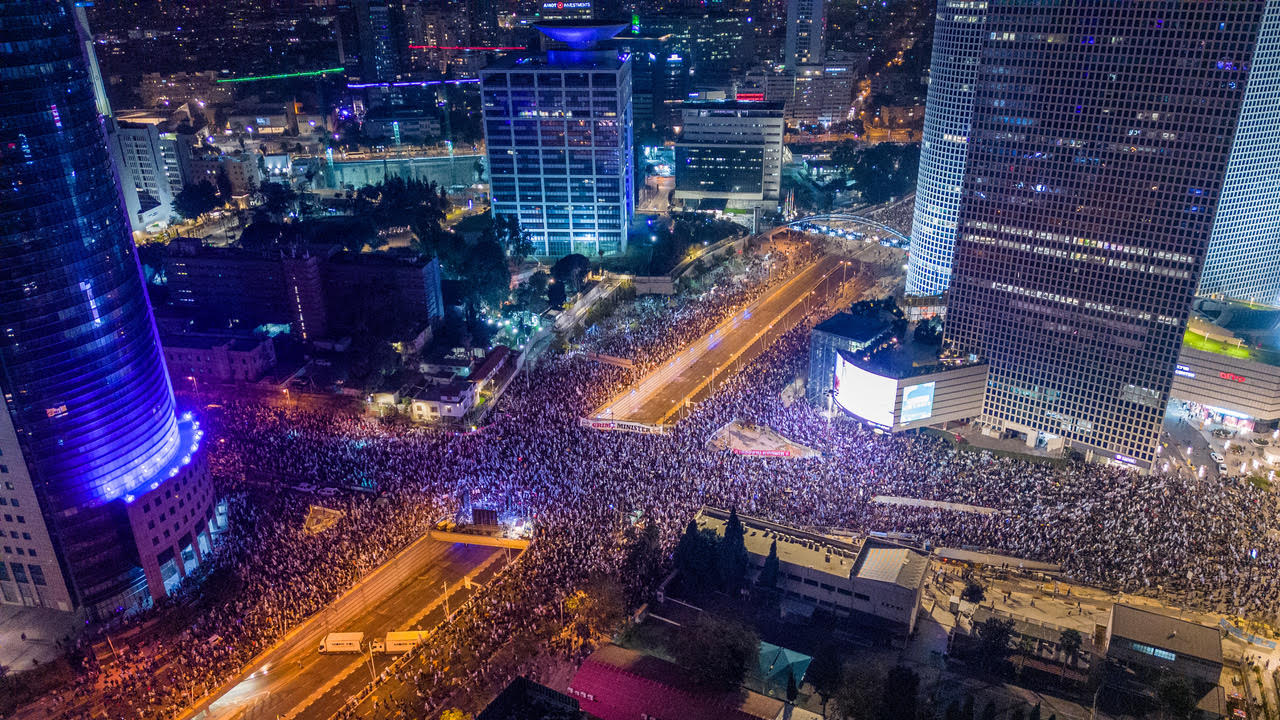
Protest against the judicial reform in March 2023

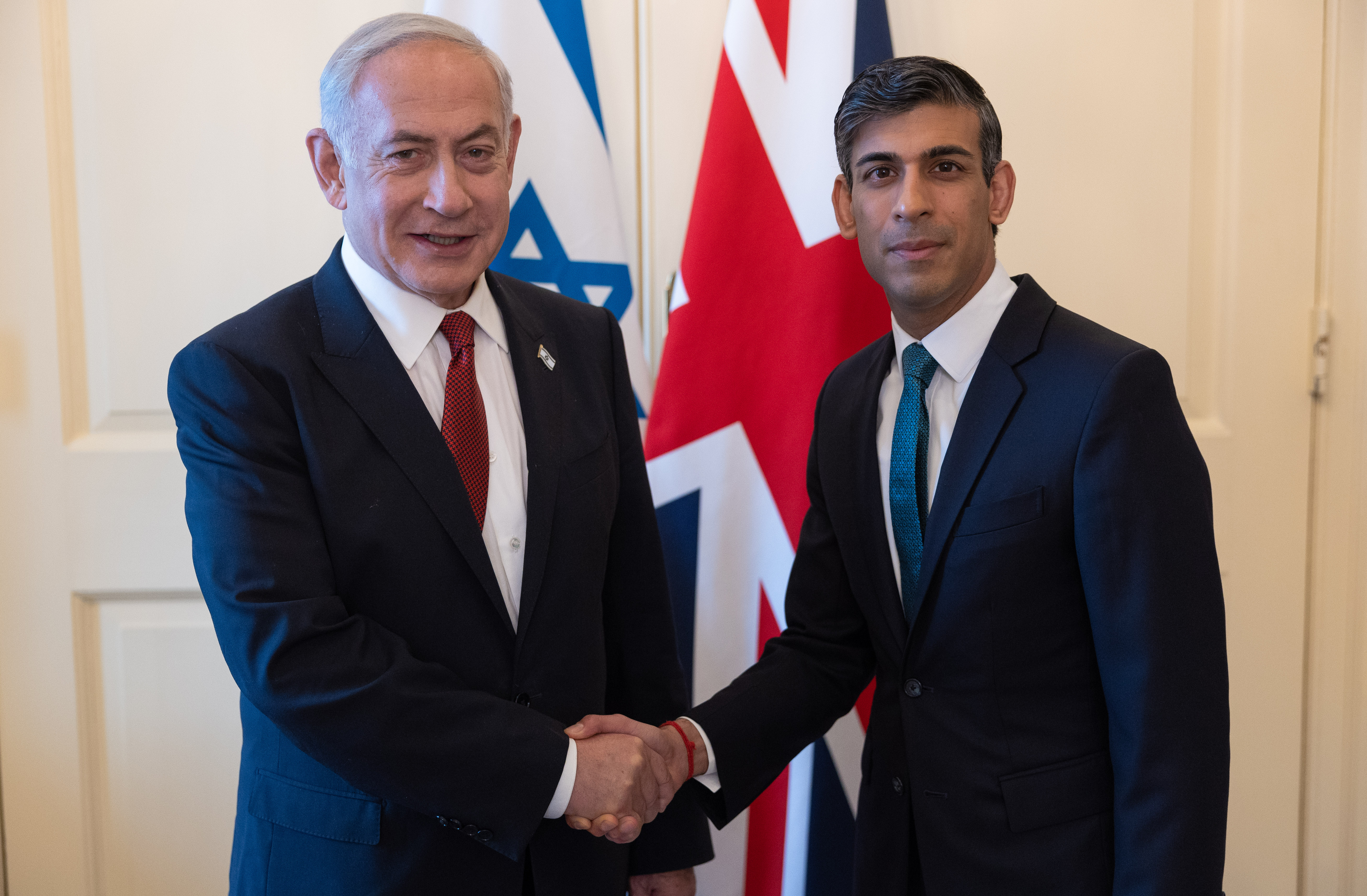
Netanyahu with British prime minister Rishi Sunak in London, 24 March 2023

After the 2022 election, Netanyahu was sworn in as prime minister again as the leader of a hardline coalition. He started his sixth term on 29 December 2022.

The first months of Netanyahu's sixth term centered around proposed reform to the judicial branch. Critics highlighted the negative effects it would have on the separation of powers, the office of the Attorney General, the economy, public health, women and minorities, workers' rights, scientific research, the strength of Israel's democracy and its foreign relations. After public protests, joined by military reservists, Minister of Defense Yoav Gallant spoke against the reform on 25 March, calling for a halt "for the sake of Israel's security". Netanyahu announced his intention to remove Gallant, sparking further protests and leading to Netanyahu agreeing to delay the legislation for a month.

In February 2023, the government approved the legalization of nine settler outposts in the occupied West Bank. Finance Minister Bezalel Smotrich took charge of most of the Civil Administration, obtaining broad authority over civilian issues in the West Bank. Israeli peace groups condemned the move as de jure annexation of the occupied territories. In March, Netanyahu's government repealed a 2005 law whereby four Israeli settlements, Homesh, Sa-Nur, Ganim and Kadim, were dismantled as part of the Israeli disengagement from Gaza. In June, Netanyahu's coalition shortened the procedure of approving settlement construction, and gave Smotrich authority to approve one of the stages, changing the system operating for the previous 27 years. In its first six months, construction of 13,000 housing units in settlements, almost triple the amount advanced in the whole of 2022.

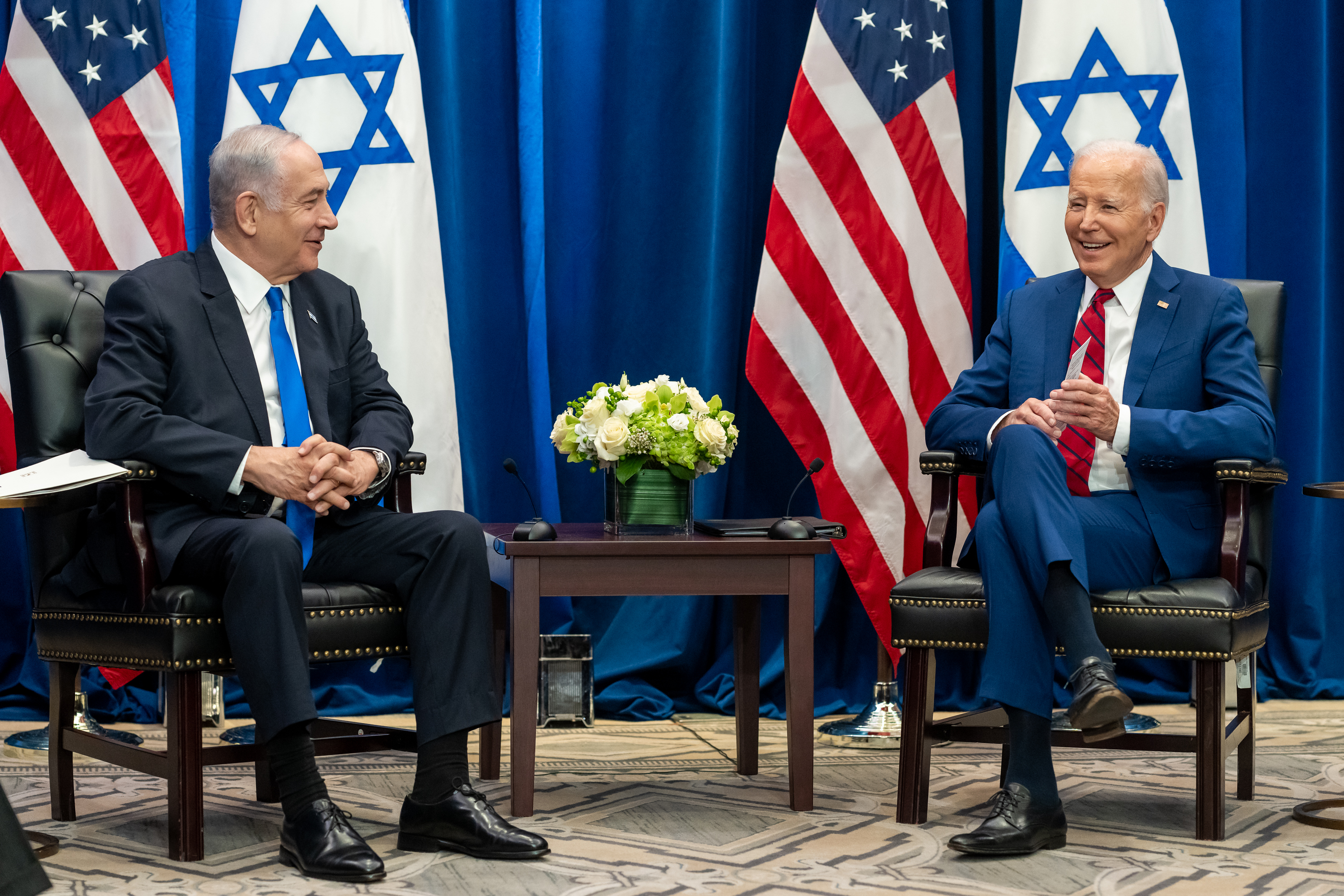
Netanyahu with U.S. president Joe Biden in New York City, 20 September 2023

Israel refused to send lethal weapons to Ukraine. In June 2023, Netanyahu said Israel is concerned "with the possibility that systems that we would give to Ukraine would fall into Iranian hands and could be reverse engineered, and we would find ourselves facing Israeli systems used against Israel."

On 7 October 2023, after Palestinian militants from Gaza launched a major surprise attack, Netanyahu announced that Israel would enter a war against Hamas. He threatened to "turn all the places where Hamas is organized and hiding into cities of ruins", called Gaza "the city of evil", and urged its residents to "leave now". He proposed opposition parties Yesh Atid and National Unity enter an emergency unity government, after Leader of the Opposition Lapid urged Netanyahu put "aside our differences and form an emergency, narrow, professional government."

Netanyahu was criticized for presiding over Israel's biggest intelligence failure in 50 years, and has faced protests calling for his removal. The war led to increased opposition to Netanyahu due to failure to anticipate the Hamas-led attack, with increased calls for Netanyahu's resignation. A 2023 poll showed that 56% of Israelis believed Netanyahu must resign after the war, with 86% holding the country's leadership responsible for the security failings that led to the attack. On 28 October, Netanyahu was accused of using "dangerous rhetoric" when comparing Hamas to Amalek, stating: "You must remember what Amalek has done to you, says our Holy Bible. And we do remember." On 29 October, Netanyahu blamed Israel's security chiefs for Hamas's attack in a post on X; this was deleted following criticism. An investigation carried out by Shin Bet acknowledged the agency's failures, but found that Shin Bet warned the prime minister that Hamas was not deterred, and objected to the divide-and-rule policy vis-a-vis Hamas and the Palestinian Authority.

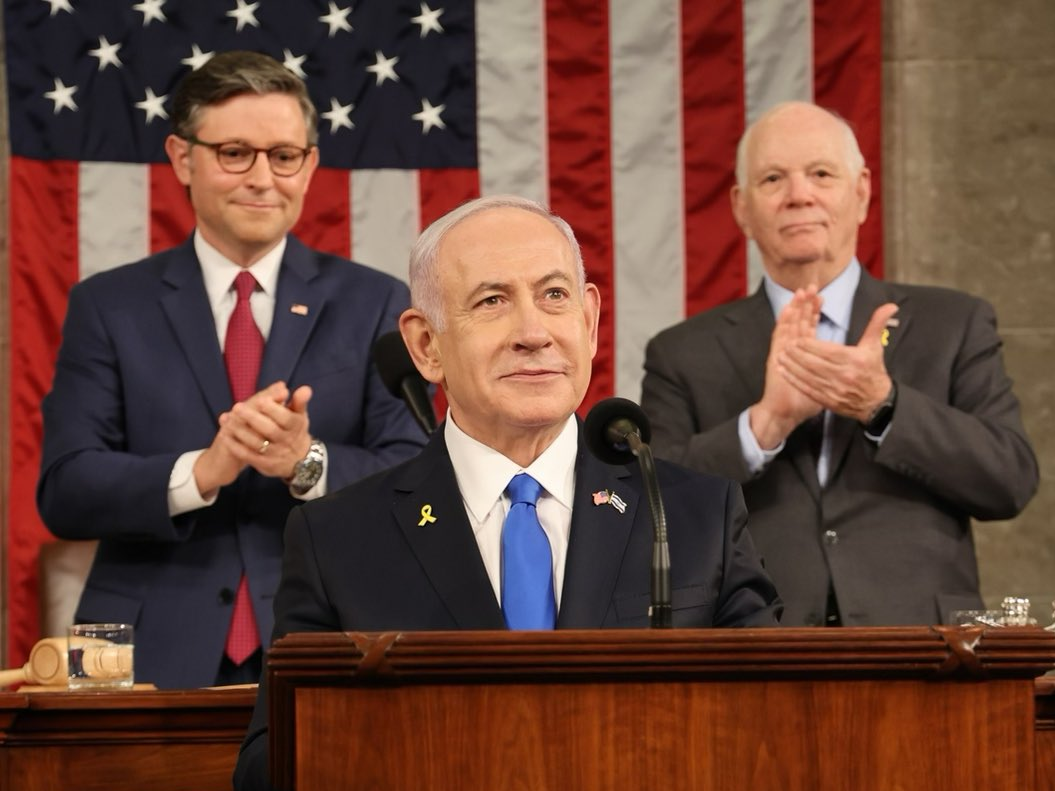
Netanyahu addresses a joint session of Congress in Washington, D.C. with House Speaker Mike Johnson and Senator Ben Cardin, 24 July 2024.

In November, he rejected calls for a ceasefire and warned that Israel will "stand firm against the world if necessary." He said the Israel Defense Forces would remain in Gaza "as long as necessary" and Israel would prevent the Palestinian Authority from returning to Gaza. Netanyahu called allegations that Israel is breaking international law "hogwash" and described Palestinian civilian casualties as "collateral damage". In December 2023, he faced criticism during a meeting with released Israeli hostages. One hostage accused him of putting politics "above the return of the kidnapped." Netanyahu said Israel should support the "voluntary migration" of Palestinians from Gaza.

Israel under Netanyahu has been accused of committing genocide in Gaza in the South Africa v. Israel case before the International Court of Justice in December 2023. In May 2024, Karim Khan, the prosecutor of the International Criminal Court, announced his intention to apply for an arrest warrant for Netanyahu on counts of alleged war crimes and crimes against humanity.

In July 2024, Netanyahu addressed another joint session of the United States Congress, amidst widespread protest, to solicit support for the Gaza war. He called protesters "useful idiots" and pledged a "total victory" in Gaza. He met with 2024 Republican nominee for president Donald Trump at his Mar-a-Lago residence where he criticized Democratic nominee Kamala Harris for vowing that she "will not be silent" about atrocities in Gaza.

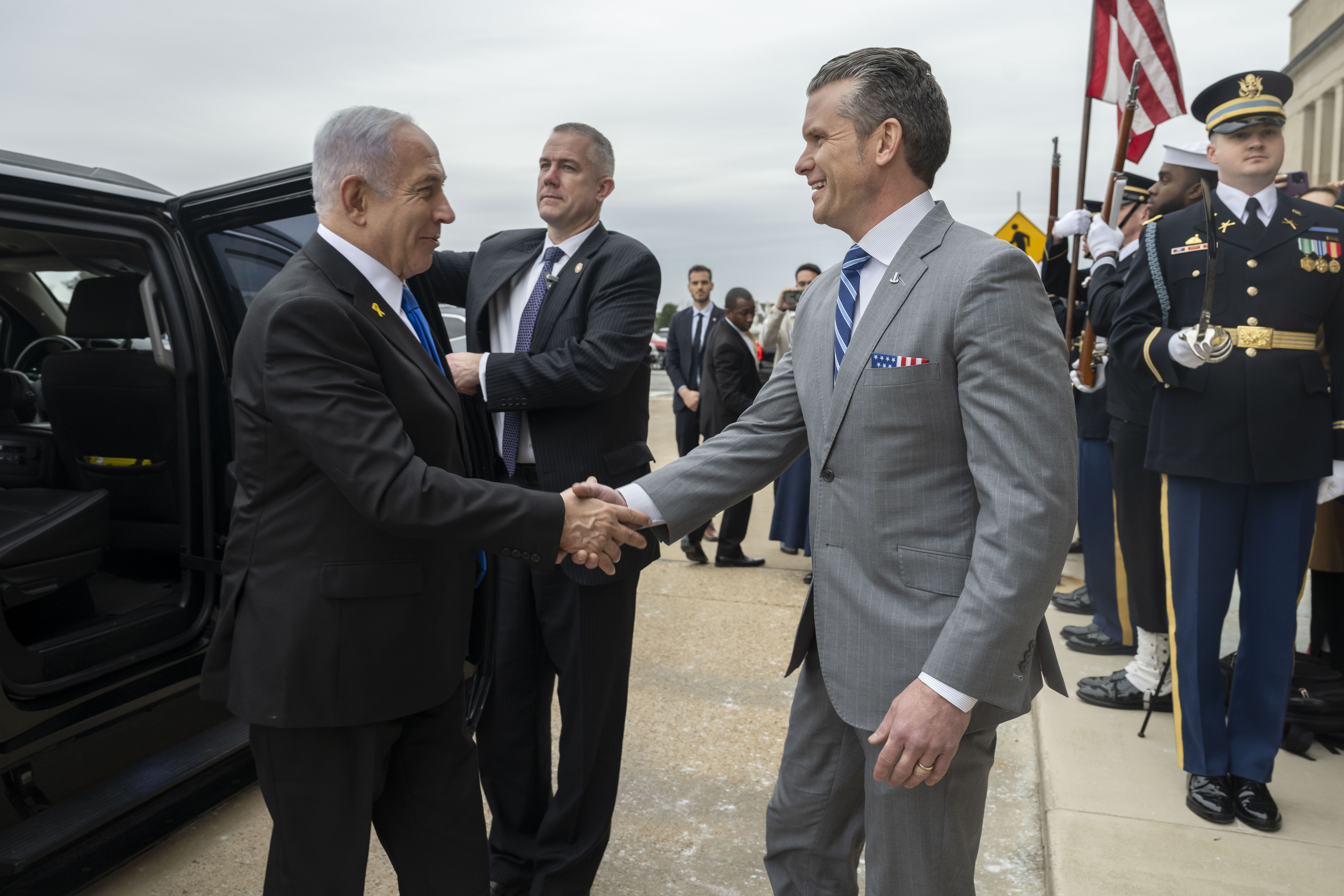
Netanyahu and U.S. Secretary of Defense Pete Hegseth at the Pentagon on 5 February 2025

In October 2024, a drone attack believed to have originated from Lebanon was made on Netanyahu's residence in Caesarea. Netanyahu was not in the residence, and no casualties were reported. Netanyahu accused Hezbollah of trying to assassinate him.

On 5 November 2024, Netanyahu fired defense minister Gallant, who had advocated for a short-term diplomatic deal. The firing triggered protests throughout Israel. On 21 November, the International Criminal Court issued arrest warrants for Netanyahu, Gallant and Hamas military commander Mohammed Deif for alleged war crimes committed during the Gaza war. Netanyahu described the ruling as "absurd and false lies" and said the decision is "antisemitic".

On the night of 18 March 2025, Israel launched a surprise attack on the Gaza Strip, effectively ending the January 2025 Gaza war ceasefire. Netanyahu was scheduled on 18 March to testify in his corruption trial, but as a result of the attacks, the proceedings were postponed. In March 2025, Netanyahu fired Ronen Bar, chief of Shin Bet, citing a loss of confidence. Bar accused the government of firing him for investigating Qatar's involvement and influence in the Prime Minister's Office, in a case known as the Qatari connection affair.

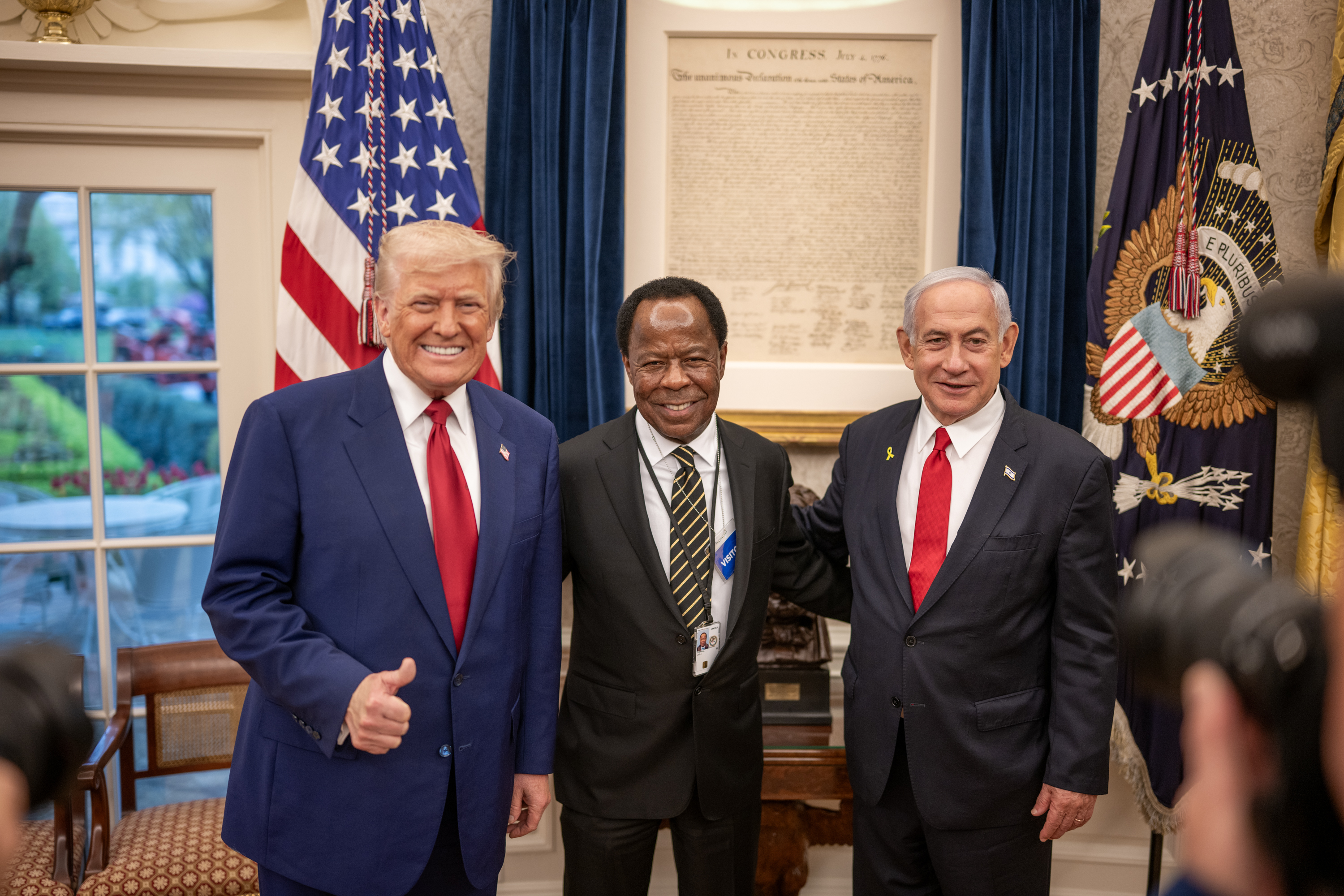
Netanyahu with President Donald Trump and Leo Terrell, the head of the Trump administration's Task Force to Combat Antisemitism, 7 April 2025

In May, Netanyahu stated that the destruction of homes in Gaza would lead to the forced emigration of Palestinians.

On 13 June, Netanyahu authorized airstrikes against Iran, marking the beginning of the Twelve-Day War. Within a week, Netanyahu publicly commented on the effects of the war: "Each of us bears a personal cost, and my family has not been exempt", as he cited that it was "the second time that my son Avner has cancelled a wedding due to missile threats." In July, Netanyahu was criticized for deciding to increase Gaza aid distribution by some in his cabinet, who rejected the U.S. ceasefire proposal.

In August 2025, Netanyahu said in an interview that he was on a "historic and spiritual mission" and "very" attached to the vision of Greater Israel, which includes the Palestinian territories and other Arab states. On 21 September, Netanyahu rejected the existence of a Palestinian state west of the Jordan River, saying, "For years, I have prevented the establishment of this terrorist state facing tremendous pressures at home and abroad." In Netanyahu's address to the United Nations General Assembly, he opposed international recognition of a Palestinian state. As Netanyahu commenced his speech, dozens of individuals exited the hall in protest.

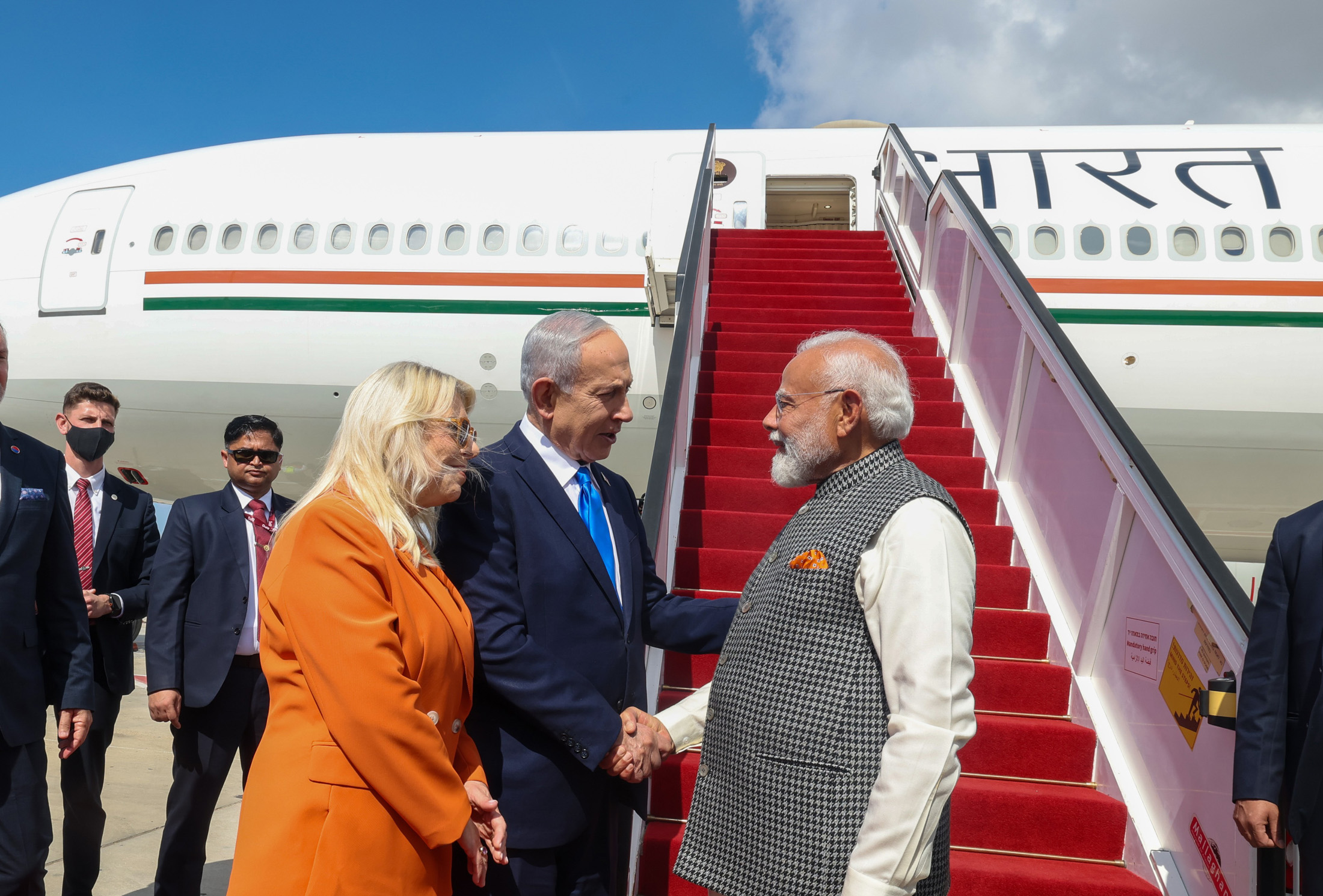
Indian Prime Minister Narendra Modi is welcomed by Netanyahu on his arrival in Israel, 25 February 2026

On 7 November, the Chief Public Prosecutor's Office in Turkey issued international arrest warrants for Netanyahu and 36 other Israeli officials, accusing them of genocide and crimes against humanity in Gaza. The charges were based on Israel's attacks on civilians, hospitals, infrastructure and the Global Sumud Flotilla, which was intercepted by the Israeli navy while delivering aid to Gaza.

On 26 December 2025, under Netanyahu's premiership, Israel became the first country to recognize Somaliland—a breakaway region of Somalia—as an independent state.

On 28 February 2026, Israel and the United States launched a major military offensive against Iran with the stated goal of inducing regime change. According to multiple diplomatic sources, Netanyahu lobbied U.S. President Donald Trump to initiate the joint strikes.

In March 2026, after Israel dropped charges against Israeli soldiers accused of sexual assault at the Sde Teiman detention camp, Netanyahu said "Israel must pursue its enemies – not its heroic fighters".

In April 2026, Netanyahu said "There is no ceasefire in Lebanon. We are continuing to strike Hezbollah with full force, and we will not stop until we restore your security."

In July 2026, speaking in an interview with Channel 14, Netanyahu said that the Gaza Strip was "no longer" a military threat to Israel, and that his decision to strike Iran had been "to save us from annihilation by nuclear bombs that were already in their hands", the latter statement drawing criticism from political rivals Gadi Eisenkot and Naftali Bennett, who disputed that Iran had ever possessed nuclear weapons. In the same interview, Netanyahu cited his ongoing corruption trial as evidence for the need for further judicial reform.

On 8 September 2026, Haaretz published an exposé claiming that Netanyahu had received advanced warning from UAE President Mohamed bin Zayed of the 7 October attacks days before, but did not warn Israeli security chiefs. In response, Netanyahu denied the reporting as an "absolute lie" and announced that he will file a lawsuit against Haaretz for allegedly committing libel against him through this exposé. Netanyahu secretly visited the UAE that month, and allegedly asked Mohamed bin Zayed to deny those reports of having received advanced warning. On 24 September, at a United Nations assembly in New York City Netanyahu denied that his administration was committing genocide against the Palestinian people, claiming Israel's actions in the war were "the opposite of genocide". Netanyahu verbally attacked the Mayor of New York City Zohran Mamdani for accusing him of genocide, in turn accusing Mamdani of being in allegiance with Hamas, asserting; "Israel didn’t commit genocide. Israel prevented genocide. And that’s exactly what Mr. Mamdani’s Hamas buddies would have done to us had we not stopped them."

On 3 November 2026, United States President Donald Trump announced that the United States would cease providing nearly 4 billion dollars in aid to Israel by December 2026, and that this had been proposed by Netanyahu. The announcement drew domestic criticism of Netanyahu, with Yair Golan saying "The cessation of American aid deals a severe blow to Israel’s security and the quality of life within the country, as the burden of funding defense needs at such a critical juncture will fall entirely upon the Israeli public," and that "A responsible Prime Minister would have fought to increase American aid, not dismantle it".

== Political positions ==
Netanyahu's tenures as prime minister have been marked by accusations of authoritarianism and democratic backsliding, including efforts to overhaul the judicial system in 2023 that critics argued were intended to protect him from corruption charges. His 2022 coalition government was described as the most right-wing in Israeli history. He has supported stricter immigration controls and has called for Israel to assume long-term security responsibility over Gaza following the Gaza war.

Netanyahu has opposed the Oslo Accords and was described by peace envoy Dennis Ross as having "no real interest in pursuing peace." In 2001, he was recorded stating he would interpret the Oslo Accords in a way that would prevent a return to the 1967 borders. He has advocated for an "economic peace" approach focusing on economic cooperation rather than political resolution. For years, he backed Qatari payments to Gaza, stating in 2019 that supporting Hamas was part of a strategy to prevent Palestinian statehood. He publicly supported the Trump peace plan in 2020. Netanyahu also played a leading role in the Abraham Accords, normalizing relations with the UAE, Bahrain, Sudan, and Morocco.

Netanyahu has described Iran as the greatest threat to Israel's existence, comparing it to Nazi Germany, and has been a prominent opponent of the Iran nuclear deal. In 2025, he authorized airstrikes against Iran's nuclear facilities, and in 2026, he launched joint strikes with the U.S. that assassinated the Iranian supreme leader Ali Khamenei and other officials, starting a major regional war. He has framed these campaigns as opportunities for regime change in Iran. Netanyahu has written extensively on counter-terrorism, arguing that democracies must balance civil liberties with security measures while treating terrorism as a form of totalitarianism.

A proponent of free-market policies, Netanyahu introduced significant reforms as finance minister, including privatization, tax reductions, and welfare-to-work programs. Supporters credited these reforms with increasing foreign investment and economic growth, while critics argued that they contributed to greater economic inequality. He supports equal rights for the LGBT community and has spoken against racism and discrimination toward Ethiopian Israelis. In 2026, he supported legislation applying the death penalty to Palestinians convicted of terrorism.

== International relations ==
=== Public opinion ===
Confidence in Netanyahu, by country (Pew Research Center, Spring 2026)

In Spring 2026, Pew Research Center found that majorities in 32 out of 36 countries surveyed held negative views of Netanyahu. (Note: The 36 countries surveyed were Argentina, Australia, Bangladesh, Brazil, Canada, Chile, Colombia, France, Germany, Ghana, Greece, Hungary, India, Indonesia, Italy, Japan, Kenya, Malaysia, Mexico, Netherlands, Nigeria, Pakistan, Peru, Philippines, Poland, Singapore, South Africa, South Korea, Spain, Sri Lanka, Sweden, Thailand, Turkey, the United Kingdom, the United States and the West Bank/East Jerusalem. Only Kenya, India and the Philippines held positive views of Netanyahu. Ghana was split evenly. Except in Nigeria and Sri Lanka, all other countries had an absolute majority without confidence in Netanyahu.) A median share of 69% did not have confidence in Netanyahu to do the right thing in world affairs, versus 21% that did. The share in the United States without confidence in Netanyahu rose from 42% in March 2023 to 59% in March 2026, with disapproval also rising in 13 out of 24 countries since 2025.

Since 2023, Netanyahu has presided over a significant decline in Israel's international reputation. In September 2026, the Haaretz editorial board stated that Netanyahu had led Israel's reputation in the United States to an unprecedented low, and Shalom Yerushalmi wrote in The Times of Israel that Netanyahu had made Israel an "international pariah". In October, Ezra Klein wrote in The New York Times that the result of Netanyahu's leadership was that much of the world "now sees Israel the way Gazans see it".

US sympathies have turned away from Israel under Netanyahu's leadership. Netanyahu has been Prime Minister since 2009, except for 18 months during 2021–22.

The Spring 2026 Pew study found that opinion of Israel was also negative in 32 out of 36 countries, (Note: Only Kenya, Nigeria, Ghana and India held positive views of Israel, and all other countries except Sri Lanka had an majority unfavorable to Israel.) and since 2025 had declined in 13 out of 24, improving in only one (Greece). In 2026, Gallup found that for the first time Americans sympathized more with Palestinians than Israelis, with the Israeli share decreasing from 64% in 2018 to 36% in 2026. Israel ranked last out of fifty countries in 2024 and 2025 in the Anholt Nation Brands Index, conducted by Ipsos in 20 countries. (Note: Argentina, Australia, Brazil, Canada, China, France, Germany, India, Italy, Japan, Mexico, Poland, Russia, Saudi Arabia, South Africa, South Korea, Sweden, Turkey (Türkiye), the United Kingdom, and the United States) The 6% fall in 2025 was Israel's fastest decline in 20 years of measurement, and was accompanied by a widespread perception that Israel is an illegitimate state.

In July 2024, YouGov found that pluralities of 44% to 57% in seven European countries, (Note: France, Germany, Spain, Italy, Sweden, Denmark and the United Kingdom.) and 38% in the United States, supported the International Criminal Court (ICC) issuing an arrest warrant for Netanyahu for war crimes and crimes against humanity in the Gaza war, with 30% in the US, and 15–24% in European countries, opposed. Large majorities in European countries of 62–74%, and 49% in the US, believed that the Netanyahu government had committed war crimes in Gaza, versus 8–12% and 26%, respectively, that did not.

In July 2026, YouGov found that Americans thought by 49% to 27% that Netanyahu should be arrested if he entered the US, and by 43% to 24% that Israel was committing genocide in Gaza. In September 2025, The Washington Post found that 61% of Jewish Americans thought Israel had committed war crimes against Palestinians, while 29% did not, and 39% thought it had committed genocide, while 51% did not.

=== Foreign leaders ===
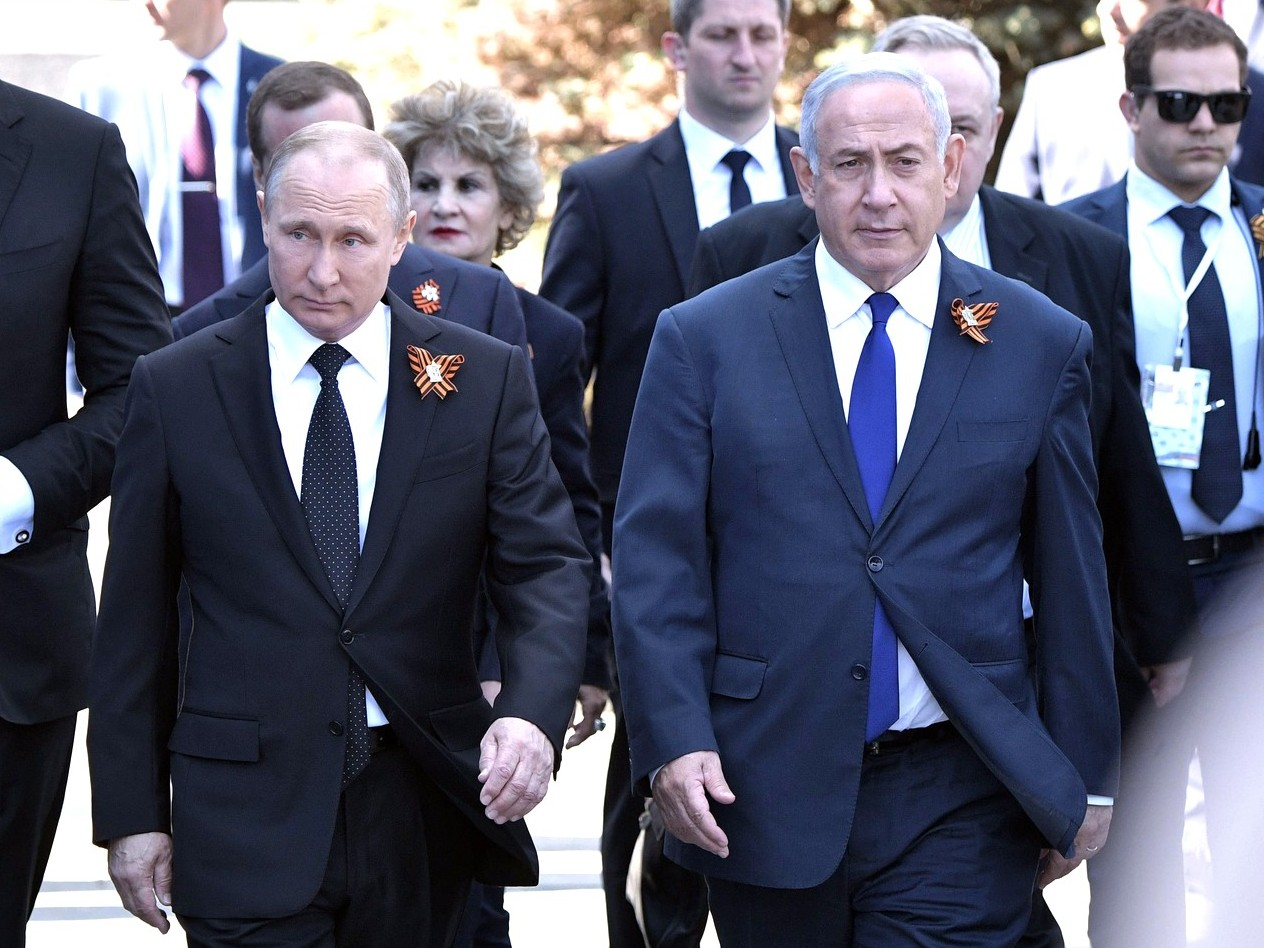
Netanyahu with Russian president Vladimir Putin at the 2018 Moscow Victory Day Parade. The two leaders have had a close relationship.

Serving as prime minister in three nonconsecutive periods since the 1990s, Netanyahu has had relationships with various foreign leaders.

Netanyahu had a warm relationship and "personal friendship" with Russian president Vladimir Putin. In his 2022 book, Netanyahu wrote positively about Putin and describes him as "smart, sophisticated and focused on one goal – returning Russia to its historical greatness". Their relationship has been strained since the start of the Gaza war.

Netanyahu and Turkish President Recep Tayyip Erdoğan have tense relations. In March 2019, after being denounced by Turkey as a racist for saying that Israel was the nation-state of the Jewish people only, Netanyahu called Erdoğan a dictator and mocked him for imprisoning journalists in a tweet. In response, Erdoğan called Netanyahu as "the thief who heads Israel", referencing the ongoing corruption scandals against Netanyahu. In the same speech, Erdoğan further escalated the spat by addressing to Netanyahu directly, saying, "you are a tyrant. You are a tyrant who slaughters 7-year-old Palestinian kids", and further in April 2018, calling Israel "terror state" and Netanyahu "terrorist". Netanyahu tweeted that "Erdoğan is among Hamas's biggest supporters and there is no doubt that he well understands terrorism and slaughter." Netanyahu condemned the 2019 Turkish offensive into north-eastern Syria and warned against ethnic cleansing of Kurds by Turkey and its proxies.

Netanyahu and Indian prime minister Narendra Modi developed a close relationship and ties between India and Israel increased during their rule.

Netanyahu has a close relationship with Hungarian prime minister Viktor Orbán, their having known each other for decades due to the privileged relationship between the Likud Party and the EPP, the European People's Party. Orban particularly admired Netanyahu while he was working as finance minister, and received advice from him during that time.

Netanyahu had a close and friendly relationship with Italian prime minister Silvio Berlusconi. Netanyahu has said of Berlusconi: "We are lucky that there is a leader such as yourself." Netanyahu has described Berlusconi as "one of his greatest friends".

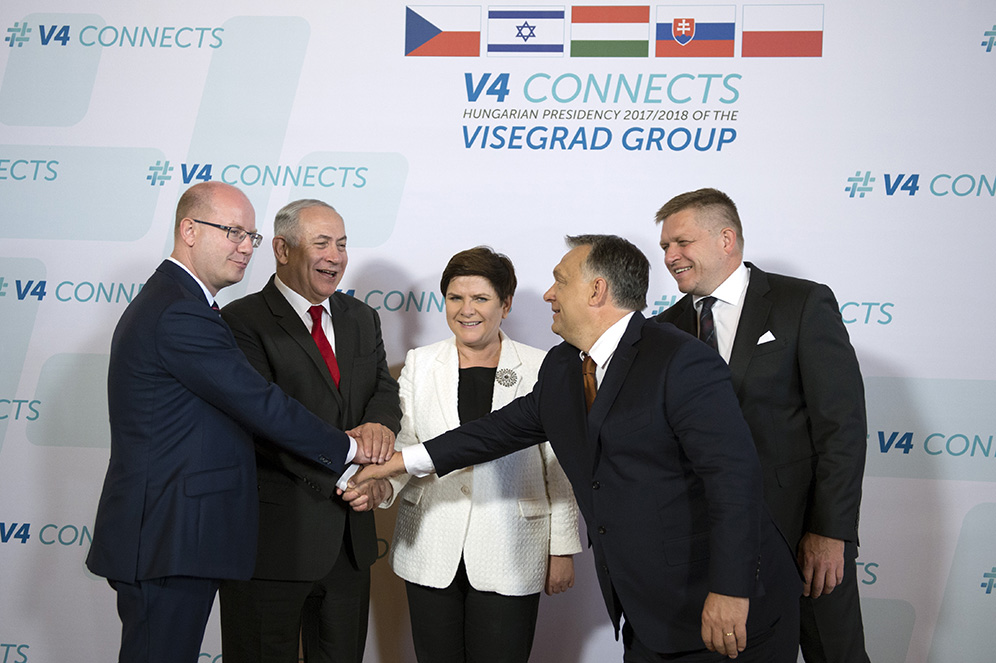
Netanyahu with Viktor Orbán and other V4 leaders at the V4-Israel summit in Budapest, Hungary on 19 July 2017

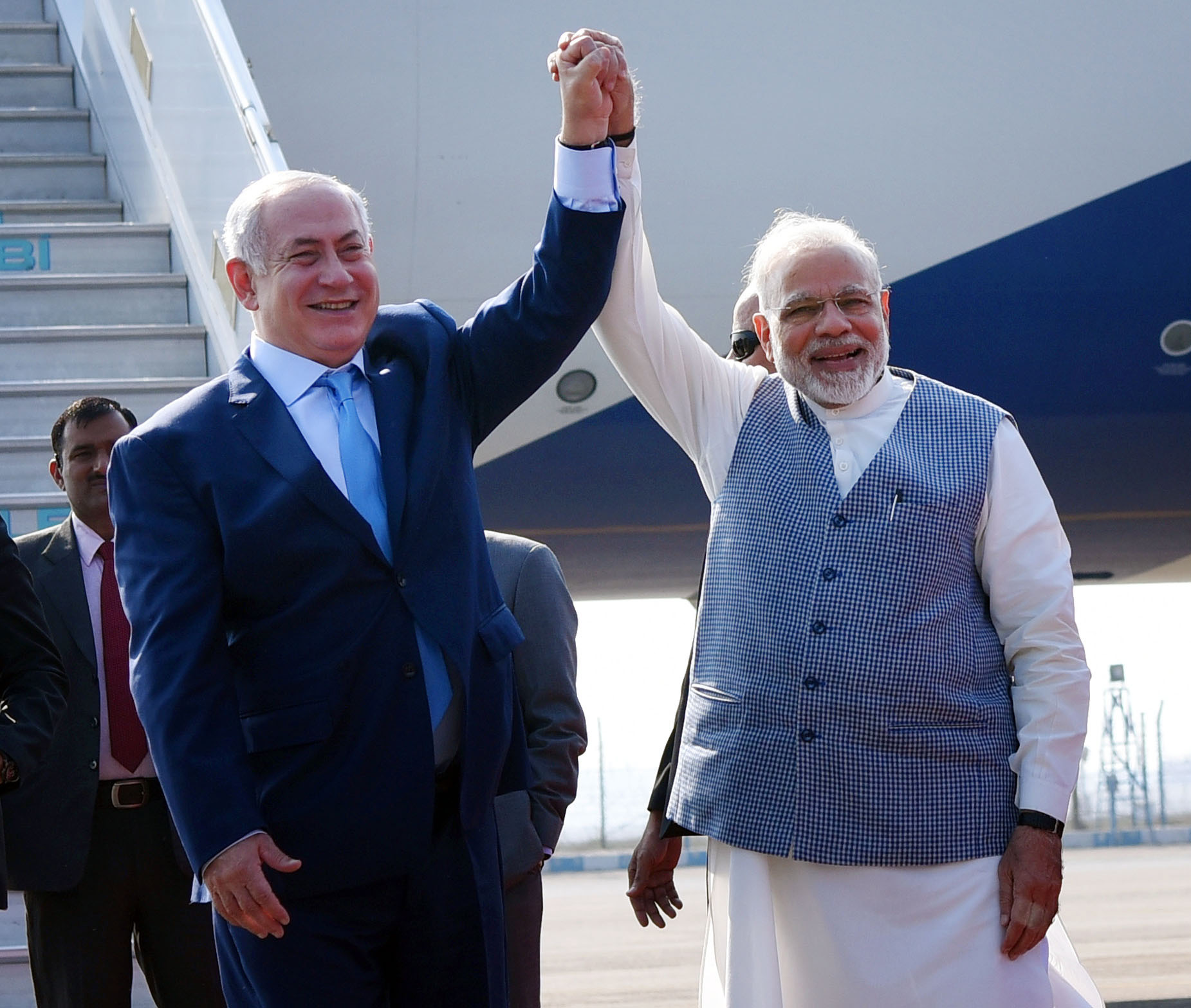
Netanyahu and Indian prime minister Narendra Modi in New Delhi, India on 14 January 2018. The two leaders have had a close relationship.

In early 2018, the Polish parliament adopted a new Polish law criminalizing suggestions that Poles were collectively complicit in Holocaust-related or other war crimes that had been committed during World War II by the Axis powers. Later that year at the Munich Security Conference, Polish prime minister Mateusz Morawiecki said "it is not going to be seen as criminal to say that there were Polish perpetrators, as there were Jewish perpetrators ... not only German perpetrators" implicated in the Jewish Holocaust. Netanyahu called his Polish counterpart's comment "outrageous" for saying that Jews had been among the Holocaust's perpetrators. The resulting crisis in Israel–Poland relations was resolved in late June that year when the two prime ministers issued a joint communiqué endorsing research into the Jewish Holocaust and condemning the misnomer "Polish concentration camps".

According to Efraim Zuroff of the Simon Wiesenthal Center, during the visit of Ukrainian President Petro Poroshenko in Jerusalem, Netanyahu failed to publicly address Ukraine's official policy of rehabilitating local Nazi collaborators like UPA leader Roman Shukhevych, who had participated in the murder of Jews.

Netanyahu had developed a close relationship with Brazilian president Jair Bolsonaro following Bolsonaro's 2018 election. Netanyahu endorsed Jair Bolsonaro's unsuccessful reelection bid in 2022 and later endorsed his son Flávio Bolsonaro in the 2026 Brazilian general election. Netanyahu has also developed a good relationship with Argentinian president Javier Milei, having called him a "great friend of the Jewish State", shortly after Milei started his presidential tenure.

Since 2023, Netanyahu and Chinese president Xi Jinping have been engaged in diplomacy, arising due to strained ties between the US and Israel. The diplomatic situation has been made complicated due to the Gaza war, where China has remained neutral.

=== US leaders ===
Netanyahu's narrow victory in the 1996 Israeli general election was seen as a rejection of the Oslo process under U.S. president Bill Clinton, who had preferred Netanyahu's opponent, Shimon Peres, in that election. According to The Times of Israel, Netanyahu "lectured" Clinton on the Israel-Palestine conflict when they first met in 1996, after which Clinton reportedly remarked in exasperation to aides: "Who's the fucking superpower here?"

Netanyahu has close ties with the congressional leadership of the U.S. Republican Party and with its 2012 presidential candidate, Mitt Romney. He and Romney first became acquainted when both worked at the Boston Consulting Group in the mid-1970s.

Neyanyahu's relationship with Barack Obama was tense, with disagreements over Iran and Israeli settlements.

Netanyahu's relationship with U.S. president Barack Obama in the early years of the Obama administration were marked by disagreements over the construction of Israeli settlements in the West Bank. During the 2011 G20 Cannes summit, French president Nicolas Sarkozy was overheard on a hot mic saying to U.S. president Barack Obama, "I cannot bear Netanyahu, he's a liar", to which Obama responded, "You're fed up with him, but I have to deal with him every day." In October 2014, author Jeffrey Goldberg said that senior officials of the Obama administration had over a period of years called Netanyahu "recalcitrant, myopic, reactionary, obtuse, blustering, pompous" as well as "chickenshit", and said that Netanyahu "acts as though he is mayor of Jerusalem". Secretary of State John Kerry phoned Netanyahu to clarify that "such statements are disgraceful, unacceptable and damaging" and "do not reflect the position of the United States". Netanyahu responded by saying "I'm being attacked because of my determination to defend Israel's interests. The safety of Israel is not important to those who attack me anonymously and personally." Observers characterized the relationship with the Obama administration as having reached a crisis level by October 2014. Goldberg reported that Israel would wait until after the 2016 presidential election before attempting to repair the relationship with the White House.

Relations with Obama worsened when the U.S., as part of the P5+1, began negotiations for an Iran nuclear deal after the 2013 election of Iranian reformist president Hassan Rouhani. Netayanu strongly opposed the 2015 Joint Comprehensive Plan of Action (JCPOA), and gave a speech to the U.S. Congress against it in March 2015, further weakening the relationship. The deal was finalized in July 2015.

In December 2016, the U.S., under the Obama administration, abstained from the United Nations Security Council vote that passed Resolution 2334 calling for an end to Israeli settlements. Previous U.S. presidents had vetoed such resolutions. At the behest of the Netanyahu government, President-elect Trump interceded by publicly advocating for the resolution to be vetoed, as well as persuading Egypt's Abdel Fattah el-Sisi to temporarily withdraw it from consideration. The resolution was then "proposed again by Malaysia, New Zealand, Senegal and Venezuela" – and passed 14 to 0. Netanyahu's office alleged that the Obama administration "not only failed to protect Israel against this gang-up at the UN, it colluded with it behind the scenes", adding it would work with President-elect Trump to negate the effects of the resolution. According to Alon Pinkas, "Netanyahu's self-righteousness that this resolution is going to be changed or reversed by Trump is totally unfounded." Deputy national security adviser Benjamin J. Rhodes said that Netanyahu "had the opportunity to pursue policies that would have led to a different outcome today".

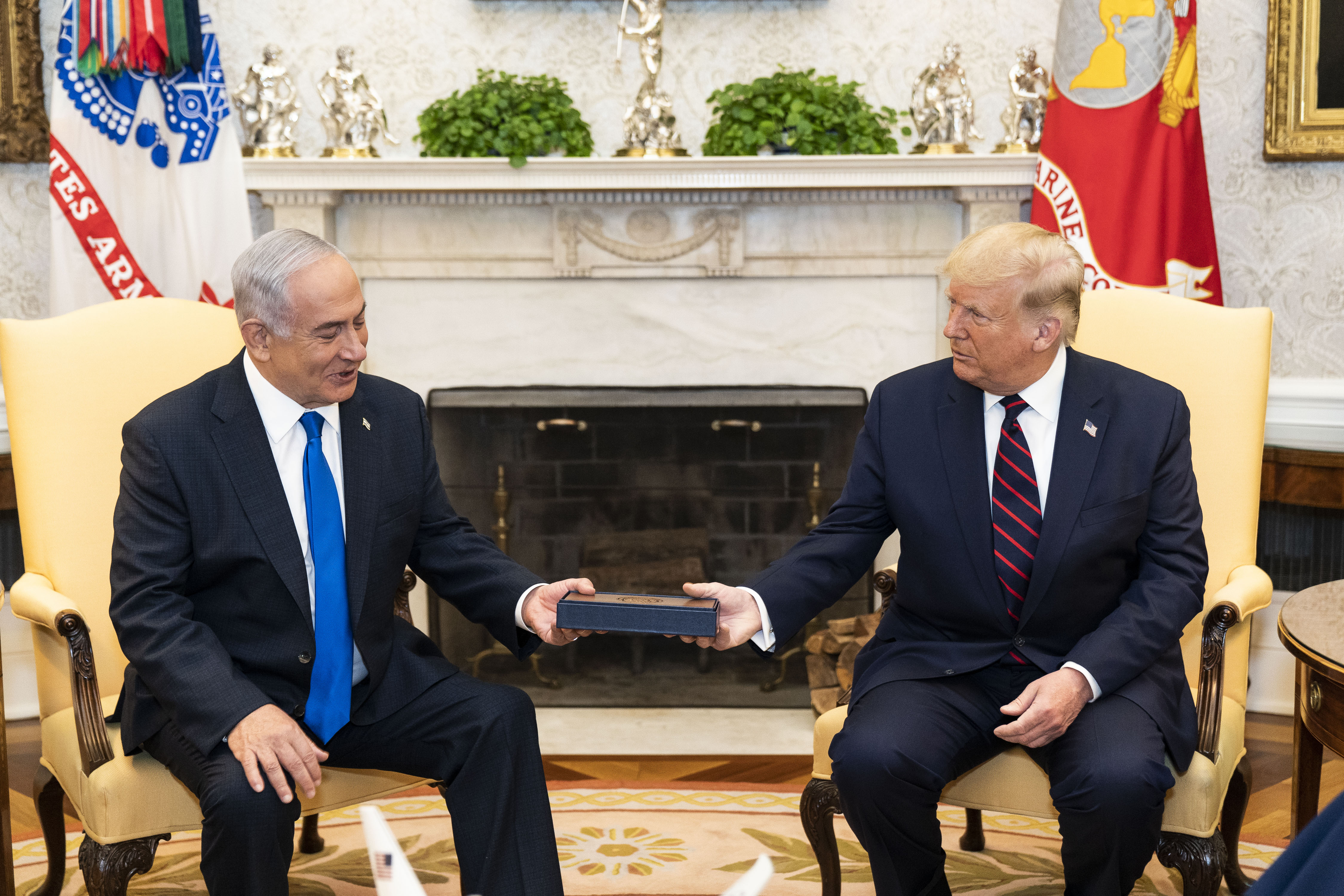
Netanyahu and Donald Trump during the signing of the Abraham Accords on 15 September 2020

Netanyahu and U.S. president Donald Trump have known each other for many years. Netanyahu had been a friend of Donald Trump's father, Fred, when Netanyahu lived in New York during the 1980s, serving as UN ambassador. In 2013, Trump made a video endorsing Netanyahu during the Israeli elections saying, "vote for Benjamin – terrific guy, terrific leader, great for Israel". In June 2019, Netanyahu officially renamed a settlement in the disputed Golan Heights after Donald Trump. However, Trump aide Jared Kushner has claimed that in January 2020, Trump became frustrated with Netanyahu's rhetoric regarding annexation of the Jordan Valley, and considered endorsing his political opponent, Benny Gantz. Following Netanyahu's congratulations for Joe Biden after the 2020 U.S. presidential election, the relationship deteriorated, with Trump accusing him of disloyalty and stating Netanyahu had "made a terrible mistake".

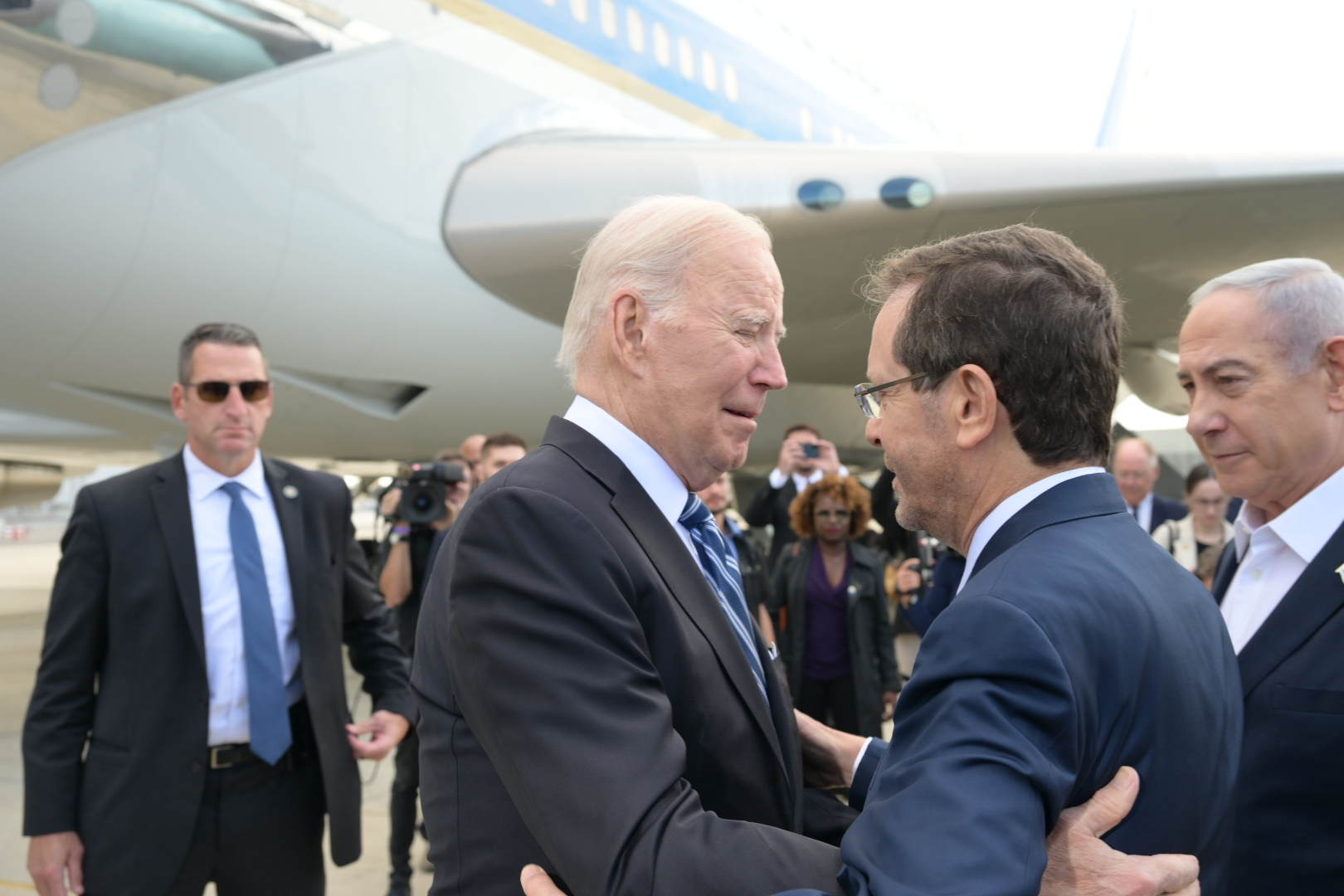
Netanyahu with Joe Biden and Isaac Herzog, 18 October 2023

U.S. president Joe Biden, a Democrat, has been friendly with Netanyahu since they first met in 1982 when Netanyahu was deputy chief of the Israeli Embassy in Washington. In November 2011 and in the 2012 U.S. vice presidential debate, Biden stated that the relationship had lasted for 39 years. In March 2010, Netanyahu remarked during a joint statement with Biden during his visit Israel that their friendship had started almost three decades prior. During Spring 2024, the relationship between the two leaders had become strained over Israel's Rafah offensive, with Biden privately calling Netanyahu a "fucking liar".

Netanyahu and Trump repaired their relationship in July 2024 amid the lead-up to the 2024 United States presidential election, in which Netanyahu endorsed Trump. Netanyahu congratulated Trump on his election to a second presidential term as "history's greatest comeback," and later asserted that Trump was "the greatest friend that Israel has ever had in the White House." Together they proposed the February 2025 Gaza Strip takeover plan and the October 2025 Gaza peace plan and attacked Iran in the 2025 Twelve-Day War and 2026 Iran war. In June 2026, Axios reported that Trump swore at Netanyahu during a phone conversation after Israel resumed bombing Lebanon, telling Netanyahu: "You'd be in prison if it weren't for me. I'm saving your ass. Everybody hates you now. Everybody hates Israel because of this." He had also expressed anger at Israel, alongside Iran, in the closing stages of the 2025 war. Trump endorsed Netanyahu ahead of the 2026 Israeli legislative election, declaring that any other candidate would be the "wrong leader."

== Personal life ==
=== Family tree ===
Nathan Mileikowsky (1879–1935); Writer, Zionist activist	Sarah Lurie
Tzila Segal (1912–2000)	Benzion Netanyahu (1910–2012); Historian	Elisha Netanyahu (1912–1986); Mathematician	Shoshana Shenburg (1923–2022); Supreme Court justice
Yonatan Netanyahu (1946–1976); Military Commander	Benjamin Netanyahu (1949–)	Iddo Netanyahu (1952–); Physician, playwright	Nathan Netanyahu (1951–); Computer scientist

=== Marriages and relationships ===
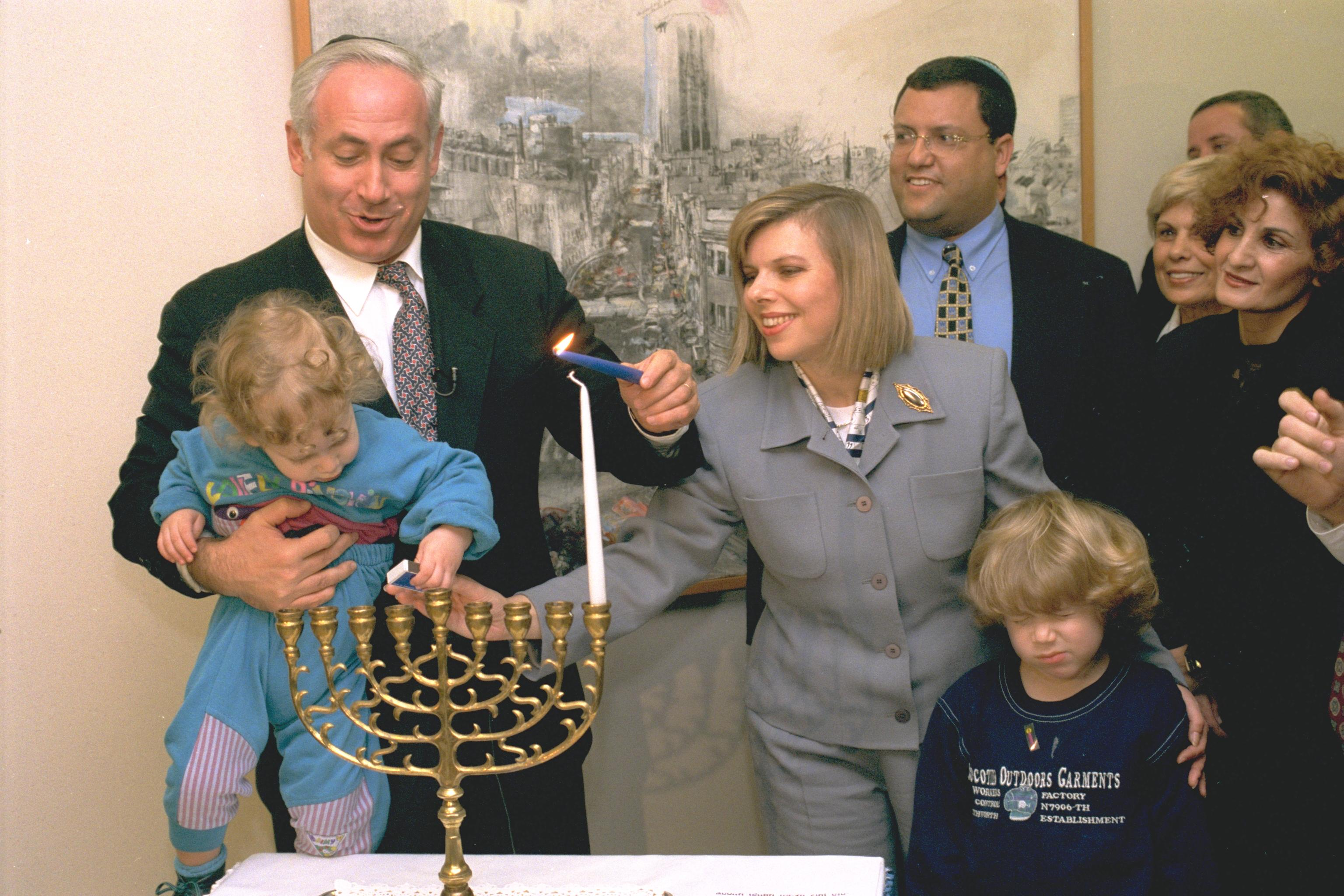
Netanyahu lighting Hanukkah candles on the first night in the prime minister's office in Jerusalem with his wife, Sara and their sons, Yair and Avner, 1996

Netanyahu has been married three times and has been involved in multiple extramarital affairs. Netanyahu's first marriage was to Miriam Weizmann, whom he met in Israel. Weizmann lived near Yonatan Netanyahu's apartment in Jerusalem, where Netanyahu was based during his military service. By the time Netanyahu's service was finished, Weizmann had completed her own military service as well as a degree in chemistry from the Hebrew University of Jerusalem. In 1972, they both left to study in the United States, where she enrolled in Brandeis University, while Netanyahu studied at MIT. They married soon afterward. The couple had one daughter, Noa (born 29 April 1978).

In 1978, while Weizmann was pregnant, Netanyahu met a non-Jewish British student named Fleur Cates at the university library, and began an affair. His marriage ended in divorce soon after Miriam discovered the affair. In 1981, Netanyahu married Cates, and she converted to Judaism. After moving with Netanyahu to Israel, Cates sued for divorce in 1988.

His third wife, Sara Ben-Artzi, was working as a flight attendant on an El Al flight from New York to Israel when they met. She was in the process of completing a master's degree in psychology. The couple married in 1991. They have two sons: Yair (born 26 July 1991), a former soldier in the IDF Spokesperson's Unit, and Avner (born 10 October 1994), a national Bible champion, winner of the National Bible Quiz for Youth in Kiryat Shmona, and former soldier in the IDF Combat Intelligence Collection Corps.

In 1993, Netanyahu confessed on live television to having an affair with Ruth Bar, his public relations adviser. He stated that a political rival had planted a secret video camera that recorded him in a sexually compromising position with Bar and that he had been threatened with the release of the tape to the press unless he withdrew from the Likud leadership race. Netanyahu and Sara repaired their marriage, and he was subsequently elected to the leadership of Likud.

=== Health ===
Netanyahu has been suffering from right bundle branch block (RBBB) since around 2003. On 22 July 2023, a pacemaker was implanted in his body. In the first half of 2008, doctors removed a small colon polyp that proved to be benign. A hernia was repaired in March 2024. In December 2024, his prostate was removed following a urinary tract infection caused by enlargement.

His personal physician and close friend is the Romanian-born pediatrist Herman Berkovits.

Netanyahu was falsely reported as dead in March 2026, and subsequently posted a video mocking the claims, which was verified by Reuters. According to i24NEWS, the rumor was started with a false report by Iranian Tasnim News Agency.

In April 2026, Netanyahu announced that he had been treated for early-stage prostate cancer. The Israeli Prime Minister's Office disclosed that the surgery he had undergone in December 2024, was for cancer, not an infection as had been previously reported.

In August 2026, Netanyahu claimed that the Iranian regime attempted to murder one of his children.

== Honors and awards ==
=== Honors ===
- Brazil
  - Grand Cross of the Order of the Southern Cross (2018)

=== Awards ===
- Israel
  - Zeltner Prize (1987)
- United States
  - Jabotinsky Prize for Literature and Research (1980)
  - Irving Kristol Award (2015)

=== Honorary doctorates ===
- Israel
  - Honorary Doctor of Philosophy (PhD) from Bar-Ilan University (1988)
- Hungary
  - Civis Universitatis Honoris Causa from the National University of Public Service (2025)

== Authored books ==
Video clip about Benjamin Netanyahu by Israel News Company

- —, ed. (1981). International Terrorism: Challenge and Response. Transaction Publishers. ISBN 978-0-87855-894-0.
- — (1987). Terrorism: How the West Can Win. Avon. ISBN 978-0-380-70321-0.
- — (1995). Fighting Terrorism: How Democracies Can Defeat Domestic and International Terrorism. Farrar, Straus and Giroux. ISBN 978-0-374-15492-9.
- — (1999) [1993]. A Durable Peace: Israel and Its Place Among the Nations. Grand Central Publishing. ISBN 978-0-446-52306-6.
- — (2022). Bibi: My Story. Simon and Schuster. ISBN 978-1-6680-0844-7.

== See also ==
- Forbes list of The World's Most Powerful People – Ranking by Forbes magazine, 2009–2018
- List of current heads of state and government
- List of heads of the executive by approval rating
- List of international prime ministerial trips made by Benjamin Netanyahu
- List of Israeli politicians
- Trial of Benjamin Netanyahu – Corruption trial of Israeli prime minister

== Notes ==
Party political offices
Preceded by Yitzhak Shamir	Chairman of Likud; 1993–1999	Succeeded by Ariel Sharon
Preceded by Ariel Sharon	Chairman of Likud; 2005–present	Incumbent
Political offices
Preceded by Yitzhak Shamir	Leader of the Opposition; 1993–1996	Succeeded by Shimon Peres
Preceded by Shimon Peres	Prime Minister of Israel; 1996–1999	Succeeded by Ehud Barak
Preceded by Ariel Sharon	Minister of Foreign Affairs; 2002–2003	Succeeded by Silvan Shalom
Preceded by Silvan Shalom	Minister of Finance; 2003–2005	Succeeded by Ehud Olmert
Preceded by Amir Peretz	Leader of the Opposition; 2006–2009	Succeeded by Tzipi Livni
Preceded by Ehud Olmert	Prime Minister of Israel; 2009–2021	Succeeded by Naftali Bennett
Preceded by Yair Lapid	Leader of the Opposition; 2021–2022	Succeeded by Yair Lapid
