= List of awards and honours received by Levi Eshkol =

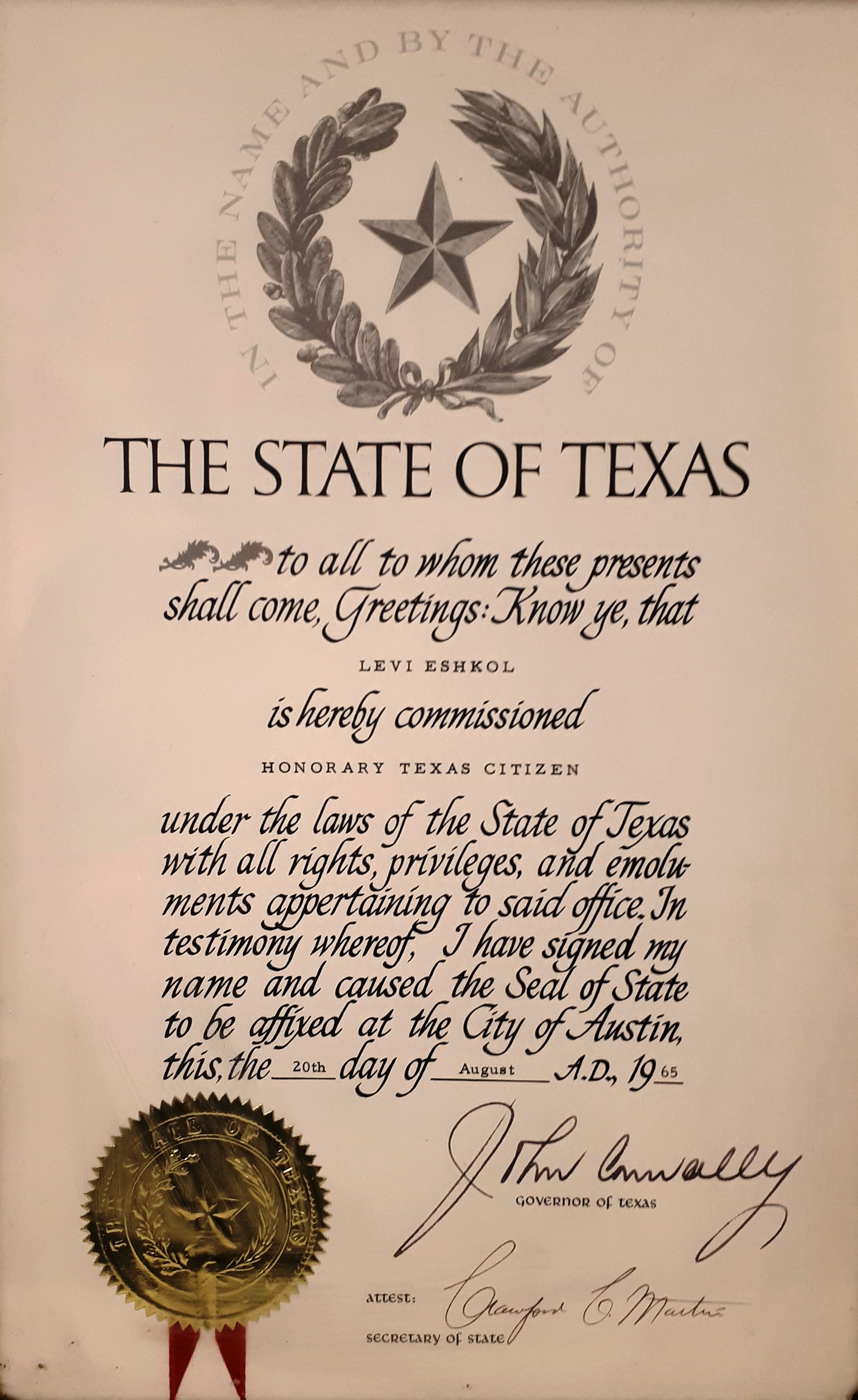
Honorary Texas Citizen certificate.

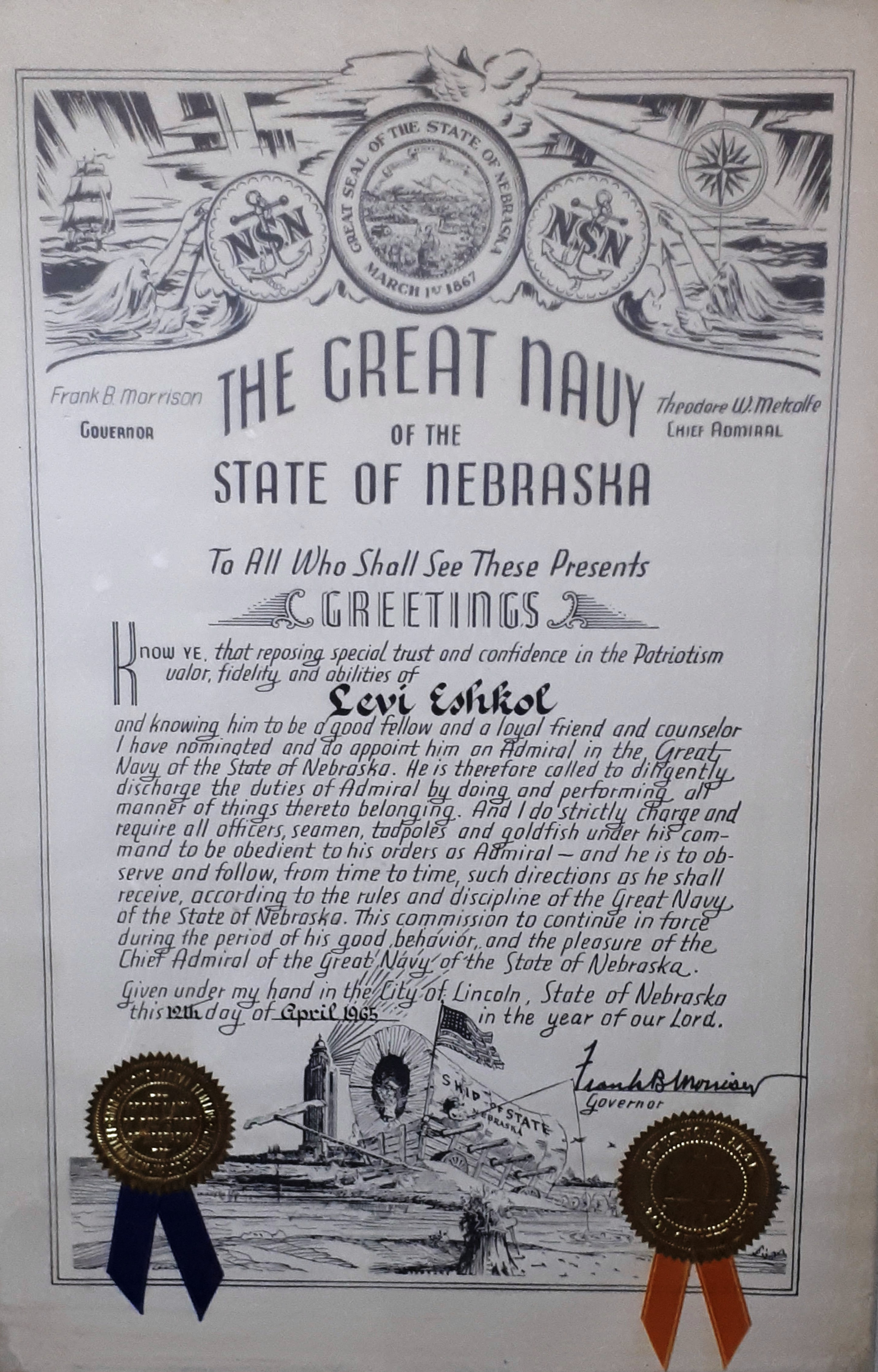
The Great Navy of the State of Nebraska certificate.

Levi Eshkol (1895–1969) was an Israeli statesman who received a number of awards and honors:

== National honors ==
- 1965 - Nebraska Admiral
- 1965 - National Order of Chad
- 1966 - National Order of the Ivory Coast (Grand Cross)
- 1966 - Kentucky Colonel
- 1966 - National Order of Madagascar (Grand Cross)
- 1966 - Order of Ruben Dario, Nicaragua
- 1968 - Honorary citizen of Texas
- Order of Mono
- National Order of Dahomey

== Honorary citizenships ==
=== Israel ===
- 1965 - Tirat Carmel.
- 1965 - Kiryat Gat.
- 1965 - Nazareth Ilit.
- 1965 - Beer Sheva.
- 1965 - Beit Shean.
- 1965 - Afula.
- 1967 - Dimona.
- 1968 - Ashdod.
- 1968 - Jerusalem.
- 1968 - Petach Tikva.

=== Abroad ===
- 1964 - Philadelphia, Pennsylvania, USA.
- 1964 - Chicago, Illinois, USA.

== Honorary doctorates ==
- 1964 - Hebrew University of Jerusalem.
- 1964 - Roosevelt University, Illinois, USA.
- 1964 - Yeshiva University, New York, USA.
- 1966 - University of Liberia.
- 1968 - Hebrew Union College, New York.

== Other distinctions ==
- 1967 - Honorary member of the National Agricultural Workers' Union.

== Posthumous ==
Since 1970, Yad Levi Eshkol is the official organization commemorating prime minister Eshkol.

Numerous national sites have been named after him, some by decision of the Israeli government:

- Eshkol Regional Council in the north-western Negev
- Eshkol National Park
- Eshkol Power Station
- Eshkol Water Filtration Plant, the central water filtration facility of the National Water Carrier of Israel.

Streets and neighborhoods have been named in his honor, among them the Ramat Eshkol neighborhood in Jerusalem. Several schools are also named after him, including HaKfar HaYarok.

- Hebrew University institutes

The Hebrew University of Jerusalem named the Agriculture Faculty in Levi Eshkol's name, as well as established a research institute in his name in the Faculty of Social Sciences.
