= Shavit Ben-Arie =

Israeli history writer

Shavit Ben-Arie (Hebrew: שביט בן-אריה; born 1985) is head of the division for cultural preservation and heritage in the Israeli Ministry of Culture and Sport. He was previously the director of Yad Levi Eshkol from 2014 to 2021. In 2011, he authored the book Havrot HaKnesset ("Female Members of the Knesset").

Between 2004 and 2011, Ben-Arie led an initiative documenting the lives and public actions of female Knesset members throughout history. His book showcased the life stories of all women members of the Israeli parliament in the years 1949-2011, alongside a preliminary research on women who served in the Assembly of Representatives during the British Mandate for Palestine. The book was published on International Women's Day in 2011 and introduced in a festive sitting of the parliamentary committee on the status of women.

In 2014 he was appointed as director of Yad Levi Eshkol. The Levi Eshkol House in Jerusalem was opened in 2016 after a process of conservation and curation. During this time he authored and edited several books and publications on Levi Eshkol, including a posthumous autobiography (titled "Crossroad") based on fragments of Levi Eshkol's testimonials on his youth years, extracted from speeches and interviews. He left Yad Levi Eshkol in 2021. During these years and after the passing of Miriam Eshkol, Ben-Arie led the organizing and digitization of Levi Eshkol's archive.

Since 2021 he is head of the division for cultural preservation and heritage in the Ministry of Culture and Sport.

Ben-Arie holds an undergraduate degree in political science, sociology and anthropology from the Hebrew University of Jerusalem and a graduate degree in government and public policy. He lectures in Israel and abroad on women in Israeli politics.

The Women's Parliament organization honored him as "Man of the Year" for "contribution to the public awareness of women's leadership".

== Published works ==
Ben-Arie is the editor and author of various publications, including:

- Havrot HaKnesset: Historiography (2011, Hebrew)
- Commercial-Industrial Club: 75 Years: commemorative album (2013, Hebrew) [Editor]
- 80th Anniversary to Rotary Club of Tel Aviv-Yafo: Historiography (2013, English and Hebrew)
- Promoting Equality: commemorative album for Israel Women's Network (2015, Hebrew)
- Miriam Eshkol: In Memoriam (2017, Hebrew)
- New Goals for an Old Purpose: Leadership and Decision-making by Levi Eshkol (2017, Hebrew) [Editor]
- Crossroad: Prime Minister Eshkol's memoirs (2018, Hebrew)
