= Eshkol =

Eshkol (Hebrew: אשכול) is a Hebrew language word meaning "cluster", usually of grapes. When not related to the Hebrew Bible and botany (where it can also mean "raceme", a region of a flowering plant's anatomy), it is normally associated with the third Israeli prime minister, Levi Eshkol.

Eshkol can refer to:

People

- Levi Eshkol, Israeli Prime Minister
- Miriam Eshkol, wife of Levi Eshkol
- Eshkol Nevo, Israeli author and grandson of the politician

Other uses

- Ramat Eshkol, a Jerusalem neighbourhood named after Levi Eshkol
