= Aviad Yafeh =

Israeli politician (1923–1977)

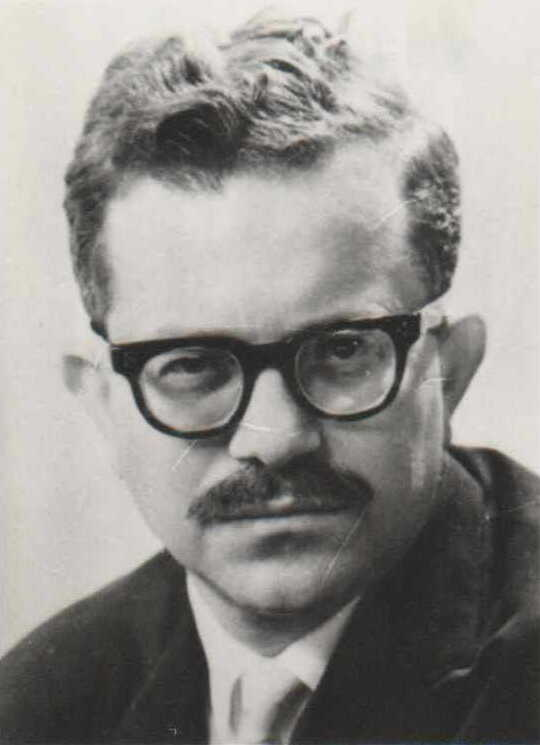
- Yafeh in the 1970s

Faction represented in the Knesset
- 1972–1977: Alignment

Personal details
- Born: 12 September 1923 Rehovot, Mandatory Palestine
- Died: 19 May 1977 (aged 53)

Aviad Yafeh (Hebrew: אביעד יפה; 12 September 1923 – 19 May 1977) was an Israeli diplomat and politician who served as a member of the Knesset for the Alignment between 1972 and 1977.

== Biography ==
Born in Rehovot in 1923, Yafeh's family moved to Jerusalem a month after his birth, and were amongst the founders of the Beit HaKerem neighbourhood. One of the leaders of Maccabi Hatzair, in 1936 he joined the Haganah. Between 1942 and 1945 he taught at a high school and the David Yellin College of Education in Beit HaKerem. He also studied humanities at the Hebrew University of Jerusalem. During the Siege of Jerusalem in 1948, he fought at al Qastal.

Following Israeli independence, he took a course in diplomacy, and joined the Foreign Service. In 1953 he was appointed First Secretary at the embassy in Canada, where he worked until 1956. Between 1957 and 1962 he worked as a consul in New York City, and was responsible for the information centre. From 1962 until 1965 he served as Director of the Information Department in the Foreign Affairs Ministry, before serving as political secretary and head of the Prime Minister's Office for Levi Eshkol and Golda Meir between 1965 and 1972.

Although he had been on the Alignment list for the 1969 Knesset elections, Yafeh had failed to win a seat. However, he entered the Knesset on 5 April 1972 as a replacement for the deceased Reuven Barkat. He retained his seat in the 1973 elections, but lost it in 1977.

Yafeh was a member of the executive at Yad Levi Eshkol.

After leaving the Knesset he became director general of the Jewish Agency and the World Zionist Organization. However, he died in May 1977 at the age of 53.
