= Gershon Zak =

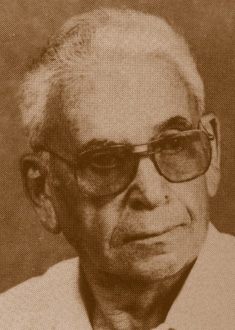
- Native name: גרשון זק
- Born: 1913; Russian Empire
- Died: 1989 (aged 75–76)
- Allegiance: State of Israel
- Branch: Israeli Navy
- Service years: 1931–1949
- Rank: Head of sea service, was not an IDF personal
- Commands: Head of the Sea service there was no commander Israeli Navy
- Conflicts: 1947–1949 Palestine war
- Other work: Establishment of HaKfar HaYarok, receiving Israel Prize

Gershon Zak (Hebrew: גרשון זק; 1913–1989) was the head of the naval service which became the Israeli Navy during the 1948 Arab-Israeli War, along with Paul Shulman. Shulman was commander and Zak was administrator for the MOD.

== Biography ==
Born in the Russian Empire in 1913, Zak made aliyah to Mandate Palestine with his family in 1926. He subsequently joined the Haganah. On 17 March 1948 future Prime Minister David Ben-Gurion (and at the time the leader of the Haganah) gave the order to create a Jewish naval service. He remained as head of the Sea Service that became the Israeli Navy until April 1949 when he resigned in order to pursue a career in teaching. The following year he established the HaKfar HaYarok youth village.

Zak was a member of the executive board at Yad Levi Eshkol. He was also responsible for renaming HaKfar HaYarok after Levi Eshkol after he died.

== Awards and honours ==
In 1986, Zak, together with HaKfar HaYarok, won the Israel Prize for lifetime achievement to education.

== See also ==
- List of Israel Prize recipients
