= 1965 Mapai leadership election =

Israeli Labor Party leadership election

- 3 June 1965

vote by Central Committee of party
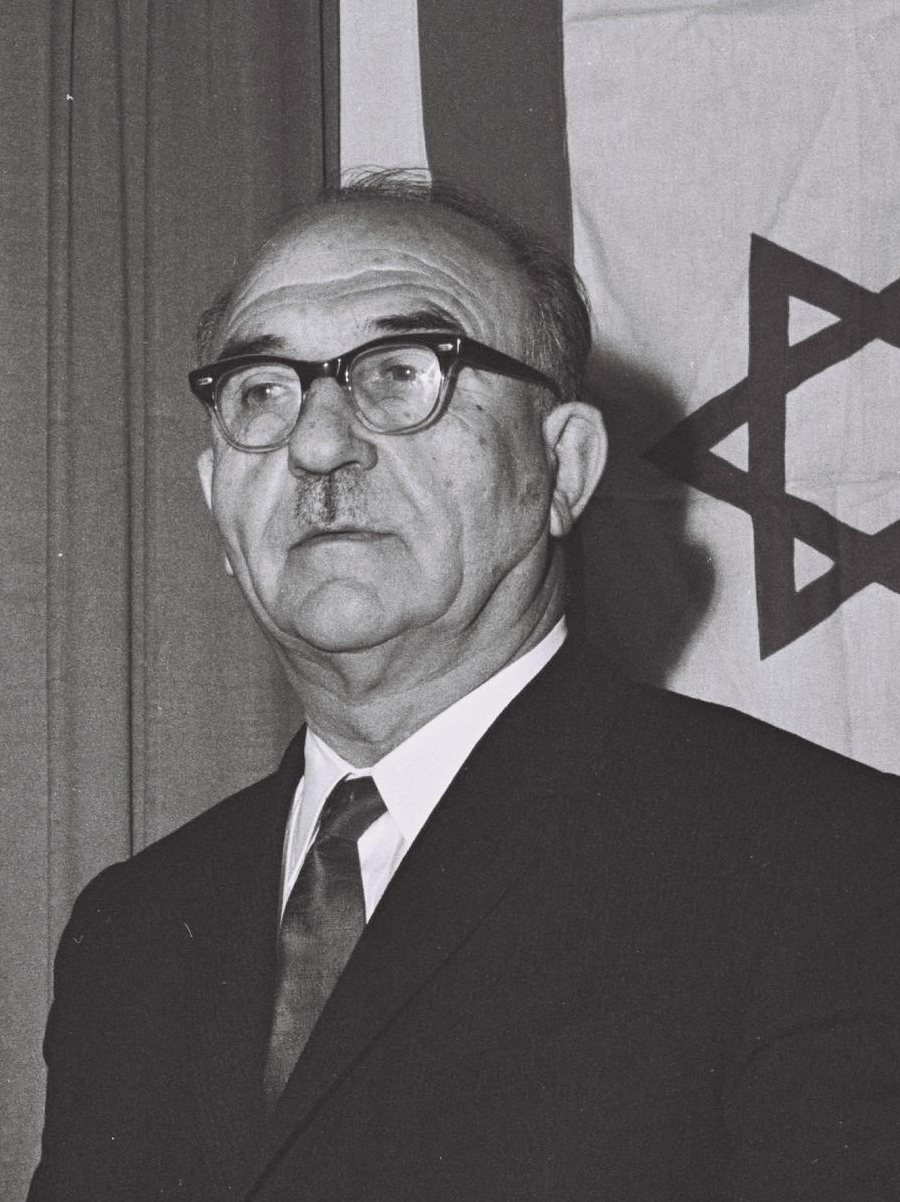

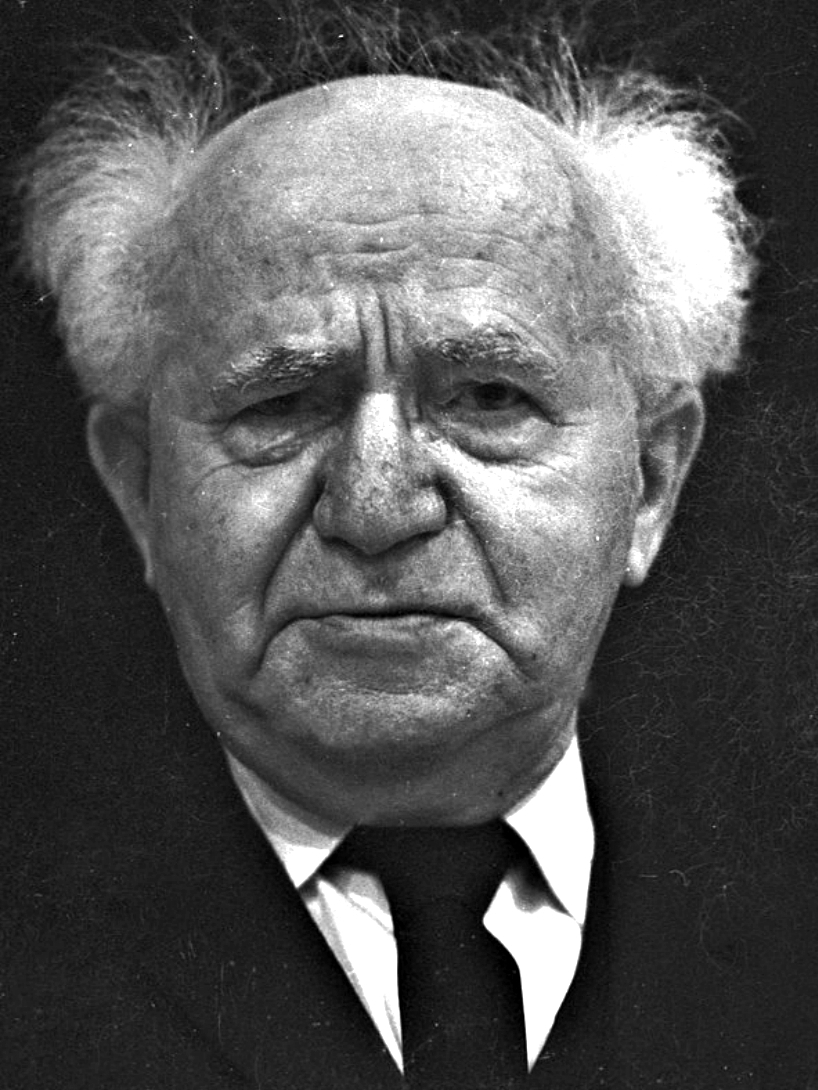
Candidate	Levi Eshkol	David Ben-Gurion
Popular vote	179	103
Percentage	63.48%	36.52%
Leader before election
Levi Eshkol
Elected Leader
Levi Eshkol

A leadership election was held on 3 June 1965 to elect the leader of Mapai. It saw the party's Central Committee vote to reelect incumbent party leader and prime minister Levi Eshkol, with Eshkol defeating former party leader (and founder) and former prime minister David Ben-Gurion. Ben-Gurion challenged Eshkol, who had been his hand-picked successor two years prior, after a feud arose between them regarding Ben-Gurion's desire for there to be a new investigation into the Lavon Affair. After losing the leadership election, Ben-Gurion broke away from Mapai and created the Rafi party.

== Candidates ==
- David Ben-Gurion, former party leader (1948–1954; 1955–1963) and former prime minister (1948–1954; 1955–1963)
- Levi Eshkol, incumbent party leader since 1963 and incumbent prime minister since 1963

== Background and campaign ==
The election was held in advance of the 1965 Israeli legislative election. The electorate was the membership of the party's Central Committee.

Until retiring from the position in 1963, David Ben-Gurion (considered to be the party's founding father) had long led Mapai. Upon his resignation, through informal consensus, the party's leading figures settled on the choice of appointing Levi Eshkol Mapai's new leader. He had been supported by Ben-Gurion to be his successor. The choice was then ratified by the party's Central Committee. This would be the last time in which a leader of either Mapai or its successor, the Israeli Labor Party, was chosen without a process with formal rules. Soon after taking office as leader, Eshkol successfully pushed for the party's constitution to be amended with a provision that the party's candidate for prime minister (the party's leader) would be formally selected by a vote of the Central Committee.

A bitter rift formed between Eshkol and Ben-Gurion, resulting in Ben-Gurion challenging Eshkol for party leadership. The rift, in part, stemmed from the Lavon Affair, with Ben-Gurion desiring a new investigation into the matter and accusing Eshkol of opposing one. There was also speculation that Ben-Gurion had expected Eshkol to serve a brief tenure as prime minister, acting as a bridge between his own leadership and that of a younger generation of leaders that would replace him. However, Eshkol promoted a different group of young leaders (many recruited from Ahdut HaAvoda) that possessed antipathy towards Ben-Gurion.

In May 1965, Ben-Gurion and four of his top aides resigned from the leadership bureau of the party. In mid-May, Ben-Gurion called Eshkol "unfit" to serve as party leader or prime minister. He called upon those who shared his view to resign from the government. After these comments, the Mapai Party Secretariat held deliberations, and subsequently adopted a resolution expressing full confidence in Eshkol as prime minister and party leader, and characterizing Ben-Gurion's statement against Ben Gurion's fitness to lead as being regrettable. In late May, two of Ben Gurion's supporters (Minister of Housing Yosef Almogi and Deputy Minister of Defense Shimon Peres) resigned from the government due to his growing dispute between Eshkol.

At times, Ben-Gurion and his supporters publicly threatened that he might splinter the party. However, by late May, it became apparent that key aides of Ben-Gurion (including Moshe Dayan, Shimon Peres and Yosef Almogi) were (at the time) opposed to the idea.

On 26 May 1965, 3,500 supporters of Ben-Gurion attended a rally in Tel Aviv at which they agreed to work to reinstall Ben-Gurion as the party's leader and as prime minister. At this first nationwide gathering of his supporters, it was also agreed not to break away from Mapai, making their goal instead to force a special party convention that would vote on who would be the party's leader for the upcoming elections. Days later, at a meeting of the party's Eshkol opponents in Jerusalem, Ben-Gurion declared that he would be willing to serve as the party's leader heading into the upcoming elections if formally invited to by the party, and declared that he would reject any offer to run on the Histadrut party list in the election.

In the leadership campaign, Eshkol largely had the backing of the party's "Old Guard", while Ben-Gurion largely had the backing of the party's "Young Turks".

Soon before the party leadership vote, Ben-Gurion rejected a proposed compromise that would have seen him as the top candidate on the party list, but Eshkol the one that the party would put forth for prime minister after the election.

== Results ==
1965 Mapai leadership election
Candidate	Votes	%
Levi Eshkol (incumbent)	179	63.48
David Ben-Gurion	103	36.52
Total votes	282	100

== Aftermath ==
Ben Gurion left the Israeli Labor Party after losing the election. On 29 June, he announced his own slate of candidates to run in the election under the label of his new Rafi party.
