= Yad Levi Eshkol =

NGO commemorating Levi Eshkol

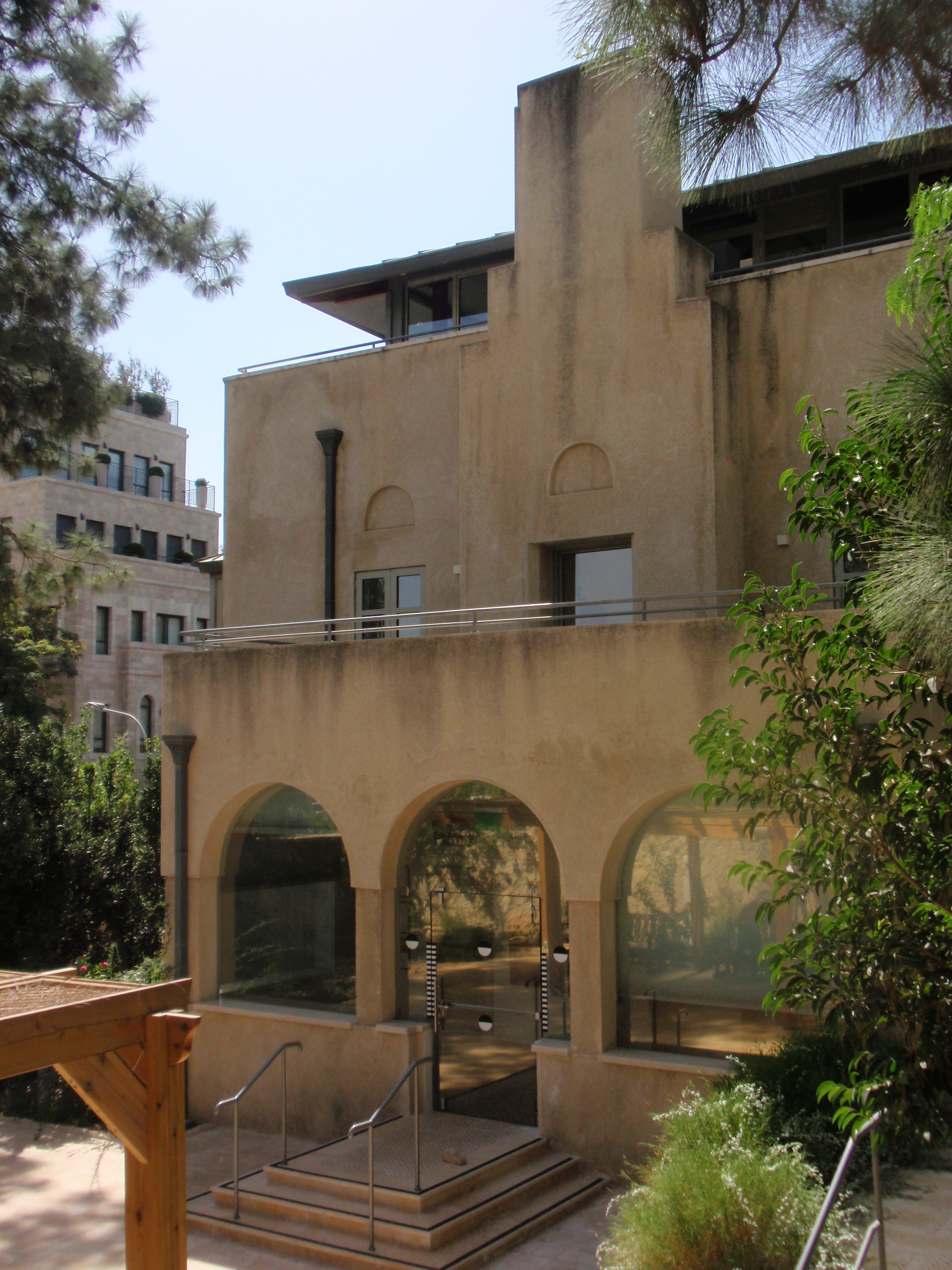
- The Levi Eshkol Center operated by Yad Levi Eshkol, 2016
- Founded: 1970
- Founder: Government of Israel
- Type: Non-governmental organization
- Purpose: Education
- Location: Jerusalem, Israel
- Key people: Miriam Eshkol
- Website: https://www.levi-eshkol.org.il

Yad Levi Eshkol (Hebrew: יד לוי אשכול) is the official non-governmental organization commemorating Israeli prime minister Levi Eshkol. The organization was founded in accordance with a government resolution made in 1970. Yad Levi Eshkol is carrying public activities in the fields of education, research and documentation. Its founding chairwoman was Mrs. Miriam Eshkol who headed the organization until 2008.

== History ==
The initial resolution to establish an institution in memory of prime minister Levi Eshkol was made shortly after his death in 1969. A committee headed by Yigal Alon and made up of government ministers and members of the Jewish Agency directorate recommended that Yad Levi Eshkol be formed to organize Eshkol's archive. Yad Levi Eshkol was registered in 1970 and operates as a non-governmental organization.

Yad Levi Eshkol was headed by Mrs. Miriam Eshkol from 1970 to 2008, when she was named Honorary President. Founding members of Yad Levi Eshkol include: Assaf Agin, Avraham Agmon, Ephraim Ben-Artzi, David Kalderon, Ami Kamir, Moshe Sanbar, Shmuel Shilo, Simcha Soroker, Aharon Uzan, Aviad Yafeh and Gershon Zak. Past members of the executive board included Michael Arnon, Shraga Biran and Arie Eliav.

== Programs and activities ==
=== Archive and research ===
In its initial goals set by the government in 1970, Yad Levi Eshkol was tasked with organization of Levi Eshkol's archive. His personal archive, containing documents dating from World War I era and until the Prime Minister's passing, is held at Yad Levi Eshkol. Digitization of the archives commenced in 2014, alongside attempts to expand its findings by launching an oral history project for gathering testimonials of Levi Eshkol's acquaintances. Later additions, in 2017, included a photo and film archive and an artifacts collection.

Yad Levi Eshkol sponsors grants to promote academic research and publications.

=== Levi Eshkol House ===
In 1977, Yad Levi Eshkol was named custodian of the former residence of Israel's prime ministers and tasked with the establishment of an institute commemorating Levi Eshkol. Eshkol lived in the residence on two occasions, as Minister of Finance (1954–1955) and as Prime Minister (1963–1969). It wasn't until two decades later that Yad Levi Eshkol was able to raise funds and make restoration work on the building, which eventually stopped in 2003 due to insufficient funding. Restoration recommenced in 2014 and the building was opened to the public in 2016, dedicated in remembrance of Levi Eshkol.

=== Educational activity ===
Since 2014, Yad Levi Eshkol promotes educational initiatives, performed on an ongoing basis across Israel and concerning up-to-date views on Levi Eshkol's actions and their relevant outcomes—surrounding the Six-Day War, the effects of his work in Mekorot water company, outcomes of the immigrant absorption policy in the Jewish Agency, and various social and economic matters shaped by Eshkol's public roles.

Other activities include the annual memorial service held at the grave plot on Mt. Herzl.

=== Publications ===
- 2005 - Six Days and Six Years, a biography by Mark Zeichik (Russian)
- 2014 - Levi Eshkol: Political Biography, 1944-1969 by Dr. Arnon Lammfrom (Hebrew), issued by Resling Publication House.
- 2017 - Miriam Eshkol: In Memoriam (Hebrew)
- 2017 - Levi Eshkol: Study Booklet for Third and Fourth Graders (Hebrew)
- 2017 - New Goals for an Old Purpose: Leadership and Decision-making by Levi Eshkol (Hebrew)
- 2017 - Levi Eshkol: Leader and Path Designer, Lesson Plans in Civic Leadership (Hebrew)
- 2018 - Levi Eshkol: Study Booklet for Fifth and Sixth Graders (Hebrew)
- 2018 - Socio-Economic Glossary in the Spirit of Levi Eshkol by Tammy Molad Hayo (Hebrew), issued jointly with the College of Management Academic Studies.
- 2018 - Humor of Levi Eshkol by Prof. Ofra Nevo (Hebrew), printed jointly with Yedioth Books.
- 2018 - Crossroad, memoirs of Levi Eshkol by Shavit Ben-Arie (Hebrew)
- 2018 - Levi Eshkol: Creative Thinking by Tammy Molad Hayo (Hebrew)
- 2018 - Is the Party Over? How Israel Lost Its Social Agenda by Dr. Laura Wharton (English)
- 2018 - Social Economy in the Spirit of Levi Eshkol: Lesson Plans by Tammy Molad Hayo
- 2018 - Levi Eshkol: Third Prime MInister of Israel, an information booklet in Hebrew, English, Russian and Arabic.
