= Miriam Eshkol =

Israeli diplomat (1929–2016)

- מרים אשכול
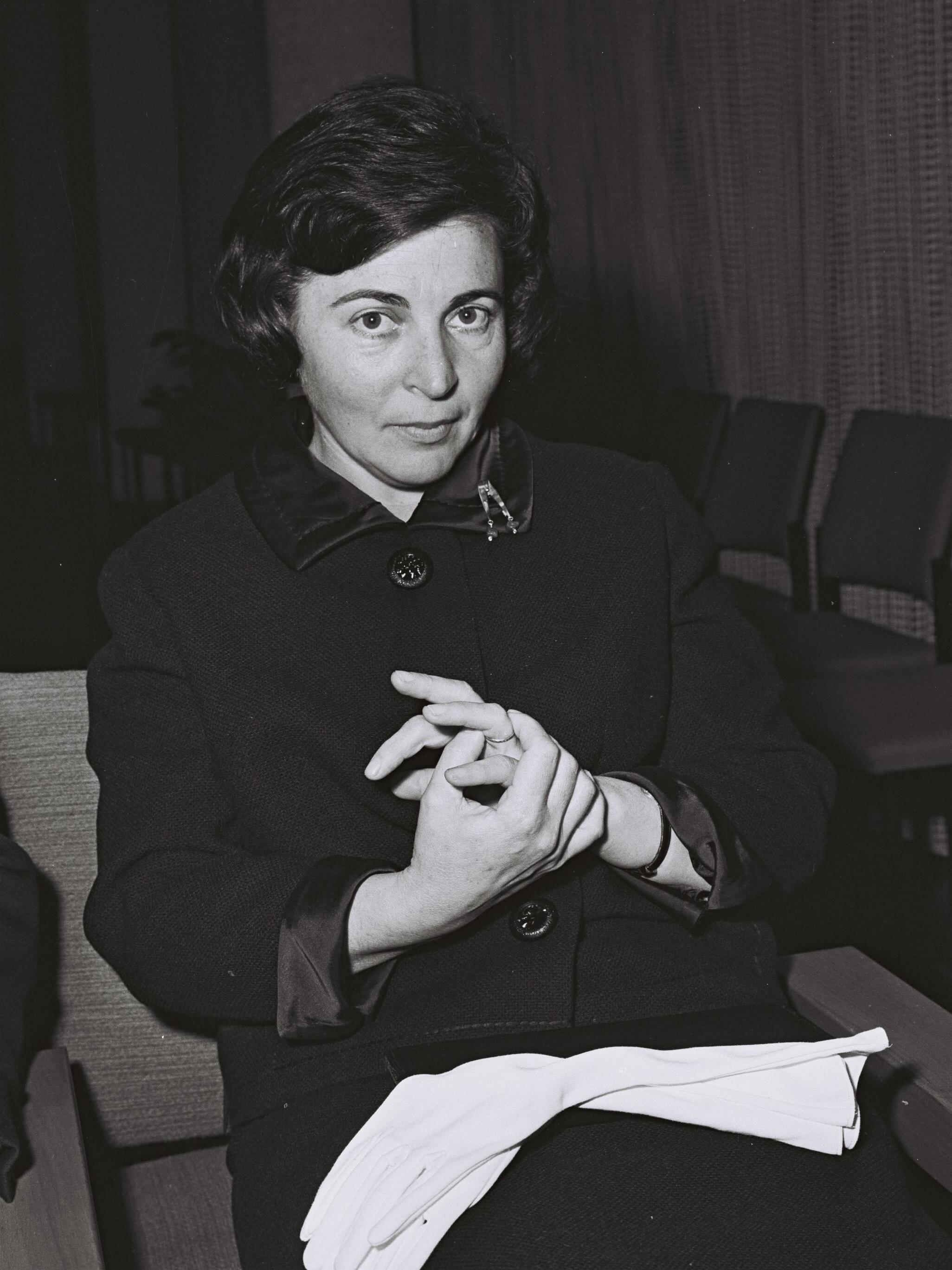
- Miriam Eshkol, 1964

Spouse of the Prime Minister of Israel
- In role 3 March 1964 – 26 February 1969
- Prime Minister: Levi Eshkol
- Preceded by: Paula Ben-Gurion
- Succeeded by: Leah Rabin

Personal details
- Born: Miriam Zelikowitz; 12 June 1929 Bacău, Kingdom of Romania
- Died: 26 November 2016 (aged 87) Jerusalem
- Spouse: Levi Eshkol (m. 1964; died 1969)
- Education: Hebrew University of Jerusalem
- Occupation: Librarian

Miriam Eshkol (Hebrew: מרים אשכול; née Zelikowitz; 12 June 1929 – 26 November 2016) was the wife of Israeli Prime Minister Levi Eshkol. In her years as the Prime Minister's wife (1964–1969) she was closely followed by the public and press, leading numerous public organizations in promotion of public causes. Following Levi Eshkol's passing she founded and chaired Yad Levi Eshkol and served as its chairwoman from 1970 to 2008.

== Biography ==
Miriam Zelikowitz was born in Bacău, Romania. She immigrated with her parents to the British mandate of Palestine in 1930. She grew up in Ramat Gan and later Tel Aviv. In 1947 she joined the Palmach and accompanied brigades en route to besieged Jerusalem. She continued her service in the Israel Defense Forces and was discharged at the rank of Sergeant.

She attended the Hebrew University of Jerusalem, graduating with a BA in English literature and general history and MA in history with a focus on Medieval history and the Crusades. She worked as a research assistant. In 1956 she began working at the Knesset library. While studying in Jerusalem, she rented a room in the yard of the official residence of Israeli Finance Minister Levi Eshkol and his wife Elisheva Kaplan.

In March 1964, she married Prime Minister Levi Eshkol at a ceremony conducted by the Chief Rabbi of Jerusalem. The news of their marriage was publicly disclosed in the following days.

== Spouse of the prime minister of Israel ==
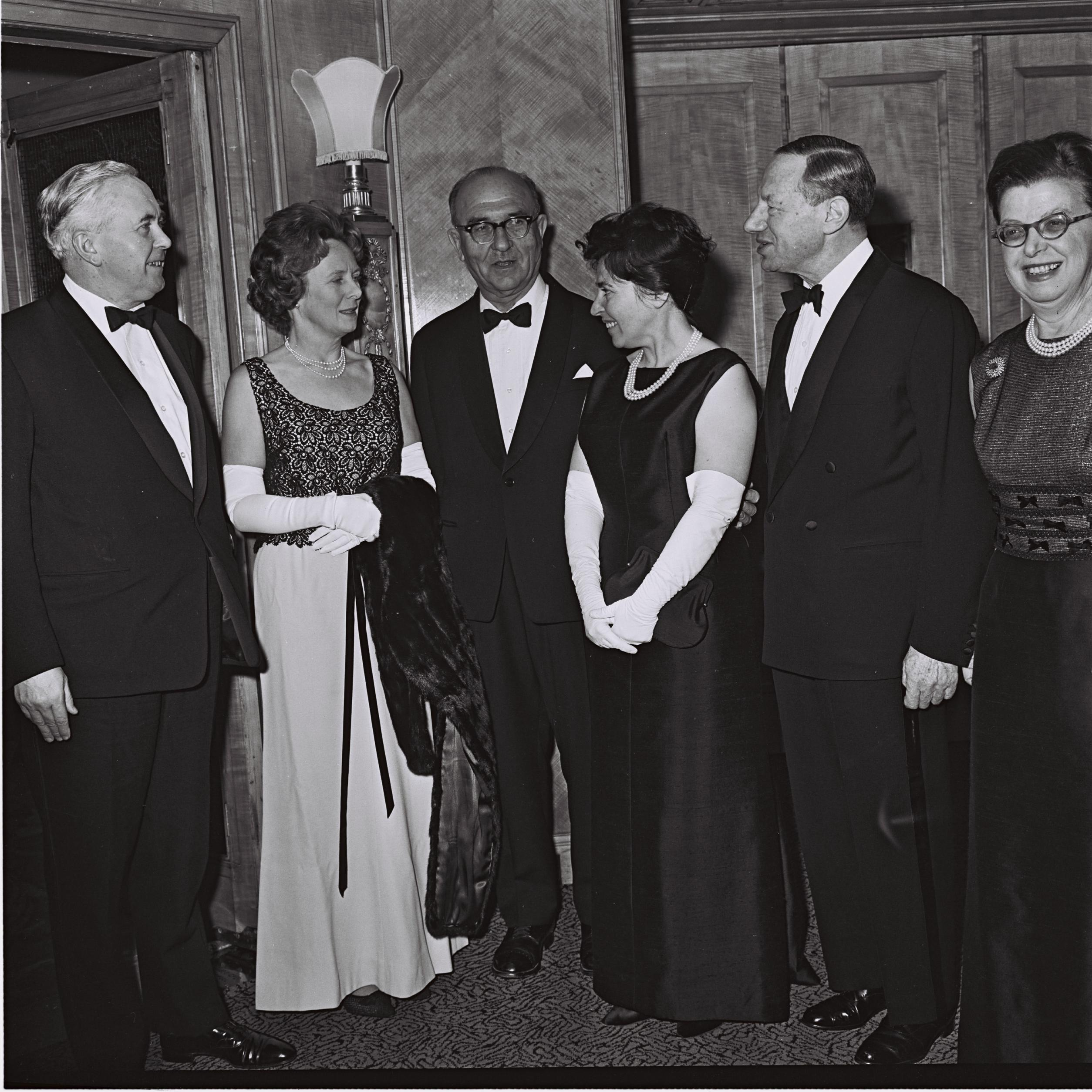
Eshkol with her husband and the British Prime Minister Harold Wilson and his wife Mary in 1965 at the Dorchester Hotel in London

After the marriage, Eshkol continued to work as a Knesset librarian, but accompanied her husband on his international travels. She headed the public committee for the establishment of Beit HaLohem, a center for disabled military veterans and was founding president of the Jewish-Arab Friendship League.

After Levi Eshkol's passing in February 1969, she headed efforts to establish an archive and collection of his personal papers. In 1970 she oversaw the establishment of Yad Levi Eshkol, serving as its chairwoman until 2008 and afterwards its Honorary President.

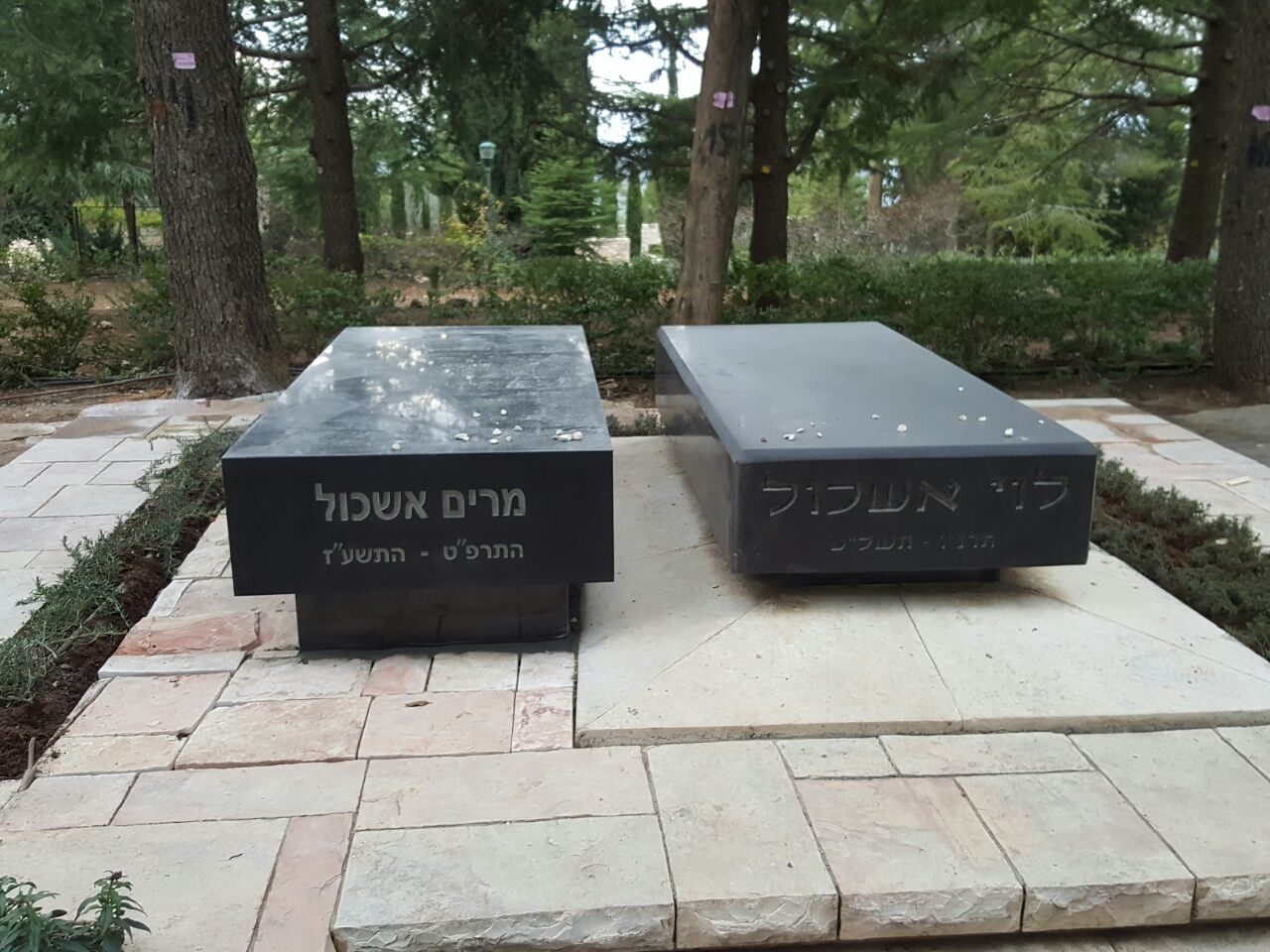
Gravesite of Levi Eshkol and his wife Miriam at Mt Herzl, Jerusalem, Israel

Eshkol served as president of the Israeli Union of Women Academicians and president of the Association for Scientific Development and Promotion of Medical Research. She was also a member of the board of directors of the Israel Museum.

She died on November 26, 2016, in Jerusalem at the age of 87.
