= Levi Eshkol =

Prime Minister of Israel from 1963 to 1969

- לֵוִי אֶשְׁכּוֹל
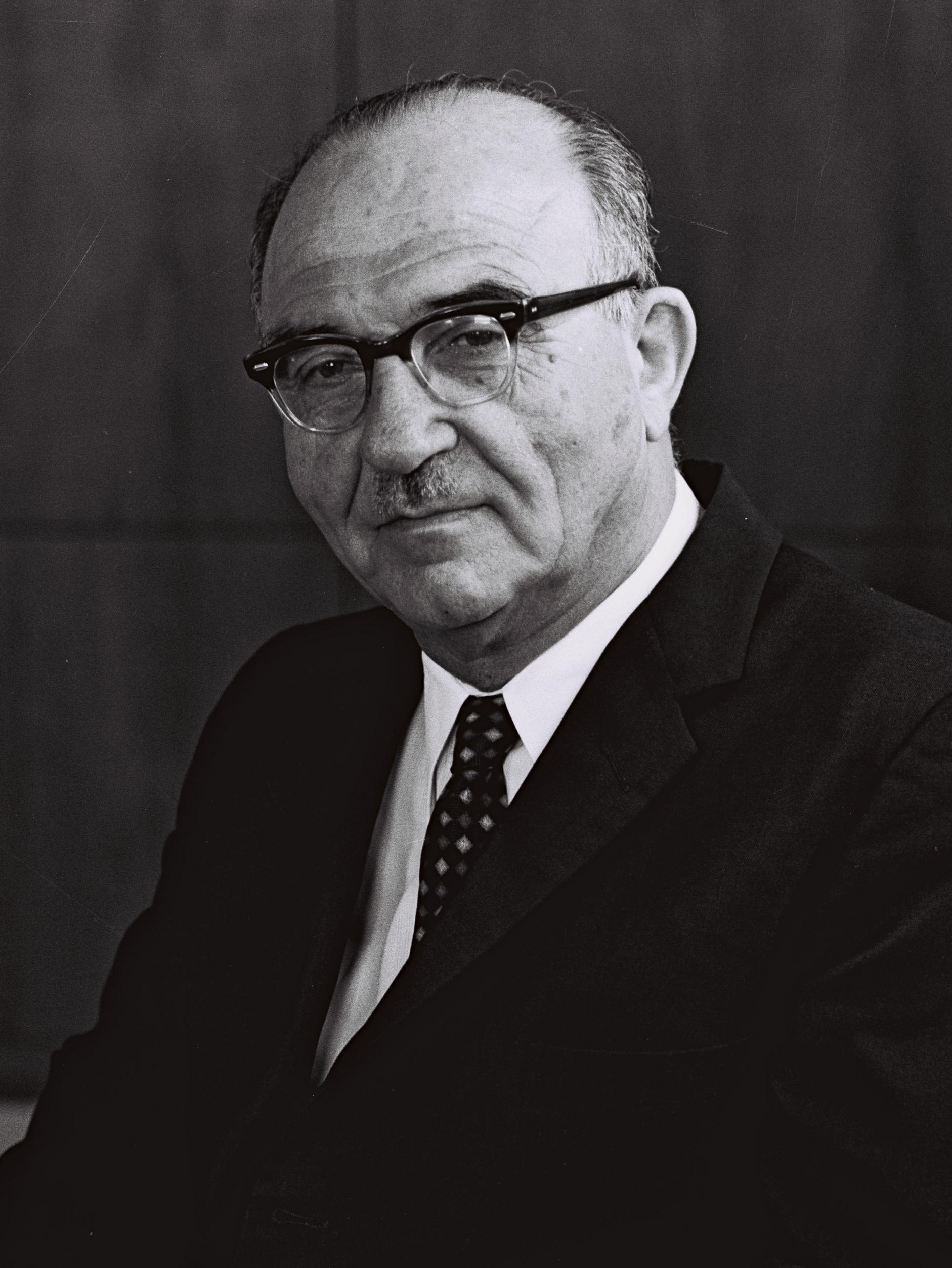
- Eshkol in 1963

Prime Minister of Israel
- In office 26 June 1963 – 26 February 1969
- President: Zalman Shazar
- Preceded by: David Ben-Gurion
- Succeeded by: Yigal Allon (Interim)

Minister of Defense
- In office 26 June 1963 – 5 June 1967
- Prime Minister: Himself
- Preceded by: David Ben-Gurion
- Succeeded by: Moshe Dayan

Minister of Finance
- In office 25 June 1952 – 26 June 1963
- Prime Minister: David Ben-Gurion; Moshe Sharett
- Preceded by: Eliezer Kaplan
- Succeeded by: Pinchas Sapir

Leader of Mapai
- In office June 1963 – 23 January 1968
- Preceded by: David Ben-Gurion
- Succeeded by: Himself (as Leader of Israeli Labor Party)

Leader of Israeli Labor Party
- In office 23 January 1968 – 26 February 1969
- Preceded by: Himself (as Leader of Mapai)
- Succeeded by: Golda Meir

Member of the Knesset
- In office 20 August 1951 – 26 February 1969

Personal details
- Born: Levi Yitzhak Shkolnik; 25 October 1895 Oratov, Russian Empire (now in Ukraine)
- Died: 26 February 1969 (aged 73) Jerusalem, Israel
- Cause of death: Heart attack
- Resting place: Mount Herzl, Jerusalem, Israel
- Citizenship: Russian Empire; Ottoman Empire; Mandatory Palestine; Israel
- Party: Hapoel Hatzair (1913–1930); Mapai (1930–1968); Israeli Labor Party (1968–1969)
- Other political affiliations: Alignment (1965–1968)
- Spouses: Rivka Maharshak (m. 1922; div. 1927) Elisheva Kaplan (m. 1930; died 1959) Miriam Zelikowitz (m. 1964)
- Children: Noa; Dvora; Tamma; Ofra

Military service
- Branch/service: Jewish Legion (1918–1920); Haganah (1920–1948)

Levi Eshkol (Hebrew: לֵוִי אֶשְׁכּוֹל [leˈvi ʔeʃˈkol]; 25 October 1895 – 26 February 1969), born Levi Yitzhak Shkolnik (Hebrew: לֵוִי יִצְחָק שְׁקוֹלְנִיק), was the prime minister of Israel from 1963 until his death from a heart attack in 1969. A founder of the Israeli Labor Party, he served in numerous senior roles, including Minister of Defense (1963–1967) and Minister of Finance (1952–1963).

Eshkol was first appointed as prime minister following the resignation of David Ben-Gurion. He then led the party in the elections to the Sixth Knesset (1965) and won, remaining in office for six consecutive years. Shortly after taking office, Eshkol made several significant changes, among them the annulment of military rule over Israeli Arabs and a successful journey to the United States, being the first Israeli leader to be formally invited to the White House. His relations with American President Lyndon B. Johnson greatly affected Israel–United States relations and later on the Six-Day War.

Eshkol was active in the Zionist movement from a young age, immigrating to Ottoman Palestine in 1914 and working in agriculture. He was among the founders of the major institutions of the Yishuv, most importantly the Histadrut and Haganah. Eshkol was treasurer of Hapoel Hatzair political party and treasurer of the Agricultural Center. In 1929, he was elected as chairman of the settlement committee within the Zionist Congress, taking a leading role in enabling conditions for new construction. In 1937, Eshkol founded Mekorot water company and was its director until 1951. Simultaneously, he held positions at the Haganah, at Mapai and as chairman of Tel Aviv Workers' Council. In 1948–1949, Eshkol was Director General of the Ministry of Defense and from 1948 to 1963, he was chairman of the Settlement Department of the Jewish Agency. Elected to the Second Knesset in 1951, he was soon thereafter appointed to key government roles.

Eshkol led the Israeli government during and after the Six-Day War and was the first Israeli Prime Minister to die in office.

== Biography ==
=== Early years ===
Levi Eshkol (Shkolnik) was born in the shtetl of Oratov, Lipovetsky Uyezd, Kiev Governorate, Russian Empire (now Orativ, Vinnytsia Oblast, Ukraine). Both his parents were Jewish, although his mother Dvora (née Krasnyanskaya) came from a Hasidic background, whereas his father Joseph Shkolnik came from a family of Mitnagdim. Both families were business-oriented and were owners of agricultural businesses including flour mills, industrial plants and forestry associated businesses.

Eshkol received a traditional Jewish education from the age of four and began Talmud studies at the age of seven. In addition to his Heder studies, Eshkol was taught by private tutors in general education. In 1911 he was accepted for studies at the Jewish gymnasium in Vilna (now Vilnius, Lithuania) and left his hometown and his family.

In Vilna, Eshkol joined the students' association Tze'irei Zion (Youth of Zion) and began his connections with the Zionist movement. He was elected to the local executive committee and, in 1913, joined Hapoel Hatzair following his meeting with party leader Joseph Shprinzak.

=== Public activity 1914–37 ===
In 1914, he left for Palestine, then part of the Ottoman Empire. He first settled in Petah Tikva and worked in the setting of irrigation tunnels at the local orchards. In later years he would be recalled as an excelling worker during this period of time. Eshkol also quickly became publicly active and was elected as a member of the local workers' union. However he soon thereafter left Petah Tikva, joining a small group that was set to settle the area of Atarot (Kalandia).

At the outbreak of World War I, fearing local hostility, his group settled briefly in Kfar Uria, Rishon LeZion and returning to Petah Tikva. In 1915–17 he was a leading member of the Judea Workers' Union. In 1918, he volunteered with the Jewish Legion and served in it until the summer of 1920.

In September 1920, Eshkol was among the 25 founders of Kibbutz Degania Bet, making it his permanent residence. However, his public activity had grown and he was often sent on various missions. In 1920, he was among the founders of Histadrut. He was also one of the founders of the Haganah. He was a member of the Haganah's first national high command (1920–21). As a delegate of Histadrut, he was an international representative in various gatherings and was tasked with organization of the "Agriculture Workers' Union". In 1929 he was a delegate for the first time to the Zionist Congress and was elected to the Zionist Executive, which made him an acting member of the executive in the newly formed Jewish Agency.

Between 1933 and 1934, Eshkol was working in Berlin on behalf of the Zionist Organization and HeHalutz youth movement. During this time he negotiated with the German authorities over what became known as the Haavara Agreement. Upon his return to Palestine in 1934, he was appointed director of Nir company, which provided funds to new agricultural settlements.

=== Director of Mekorot ===
Eshkol lobbied for a national water company from circa 1930, presenting budget plans before the World Zionist Organization in 1933 and 1935. The formation of Mekorot water company was made possible in February 1937 under joint management of the Jewish Agency, Histadrut and the Jewish National Fund. Eshkol served as its director until 1951, overseeing its expansion in 1938 from agricultural territories to residential areas and the construction of the first water lines to the southern Negev area as early as 1941. By 1947, more than 200 kilometers of water lines were active.

=== Political and military activity 1940–49 ===
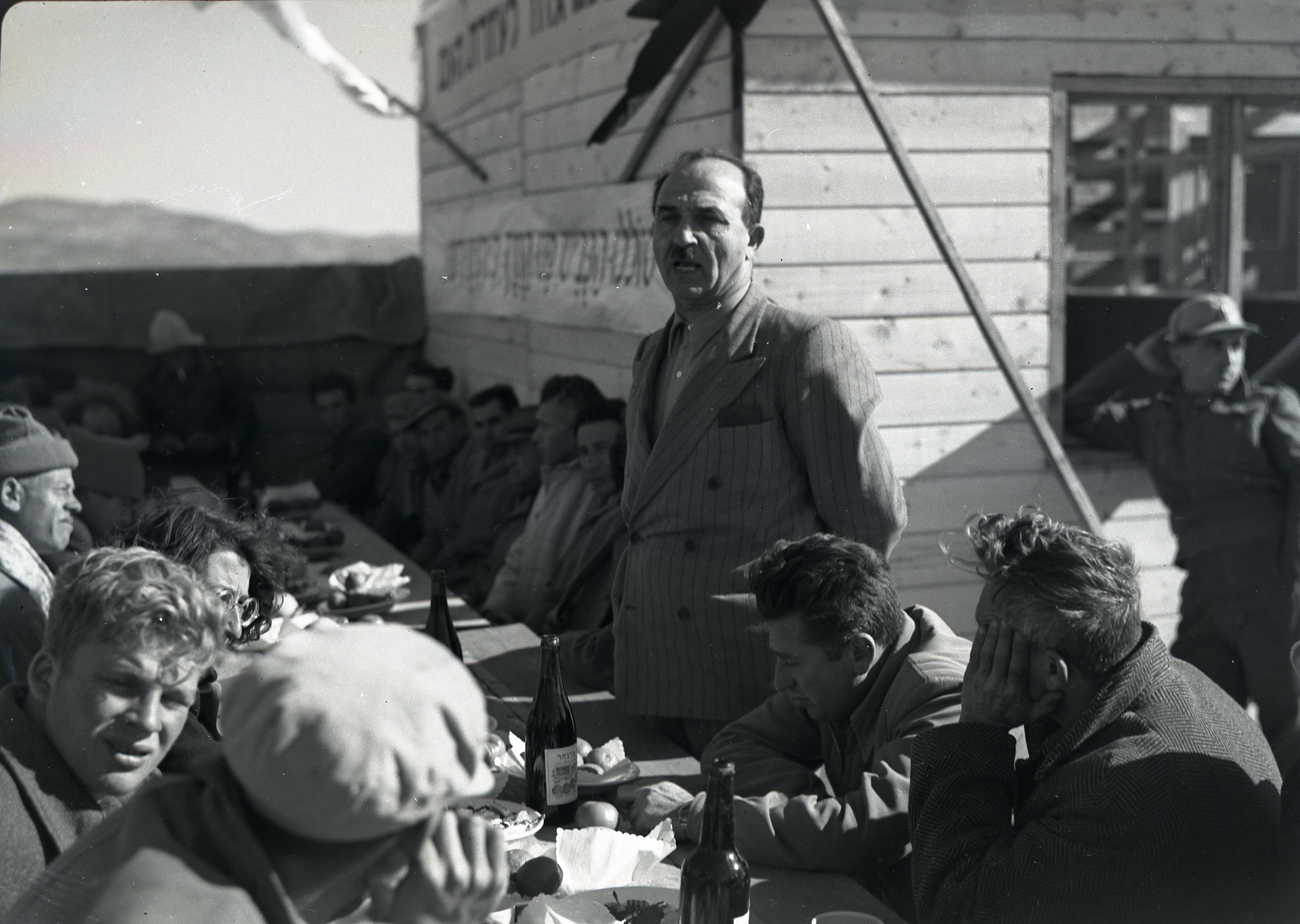
Eshkol at kibbutz Yas'ur in 1949

Eshkol returned to serve in the Haganah high command from 1940 to 1948 and was in charge of the organization's treasury. He engaged in arms acquisition for the Haganah prior to and during the 1948 Arab–Israeli War.

Between 1942 and 1944, Eshkol served as Secretary General of Mapai.

During the Second World War Eshkol advocated for Jewish enrollment to the British Armed Forces. However, he confirmed with the Yishuv's leadership and later joined the ideology asserting differentiation between the global front and the local front, fighting against the British Mandate. In 1945–46 Eshkol was representative of Haganah in the leadership of the Jewish Resistance Movement.

In 1944 he was appointed as the Secretary General of Tel Aviv Workers' Council, remaining in this position until 1948.

In 1947 Eshkol was appointed as a member of the two major defense forums: The Negev Committee that oversaw the administration of the Negev prior to the declaration of independence of Israel, as well as the general Defense Committee of the Yishuv's leadership. Later that year, he was appointed by David Ben-Gurion to head the national recruitment center, which laid foundations to the formation of Israel Defense Forces upon independence of the State of Israel, in May 1948, at which point Eshkol was appointed Director-General of the Ministry of Defense, serving from May 1948 to January 1949.

=== Rise to national political career ===
During the time of mass immigration to the State of Israel (1949–1950), Eshkol headed the Settlement Department in the Jewish Agency, where he first proposed the idea of settling a good number of these immigrants upon newly founded agricultural farms, in order to solve their housing dilemma. He is noted as saying, "We didn't know exactly what to do with these Jews. Then we interjected from the counsels of our heart, and from the experience that we had amassed thus far, and said: A desolate country, a desolate people; these two things must cause one another to blossom. From this, the idea was born to launch an extensive agricultural settlement operation and absorb a large part of the immigrants." Eshkol was elected to the Knesset in 1951 as a member of Mapai party. He served as Minister of Agriculture until 1952.

In the 1959 legislative election, Eshkol coordinated Mapai's national campaign with the local party branches. He was also appointed as chairman of the party's committee on social affairs. As internal party tension was growing due to the Lavon Affair, Eshkol was asked to serve as an arbitrator.

In 1961, Ben-Gurion asked to retire as prime minister and recommended Eshkol as his successor. However, Mapai made Ben-Gurion stay. Ben-Gurion continued to lead Mapai in the 1961 legislative election but struggled to form a coalition and relied on Eshkol's negotiations with rival parties.

=== Minister of Finance ===
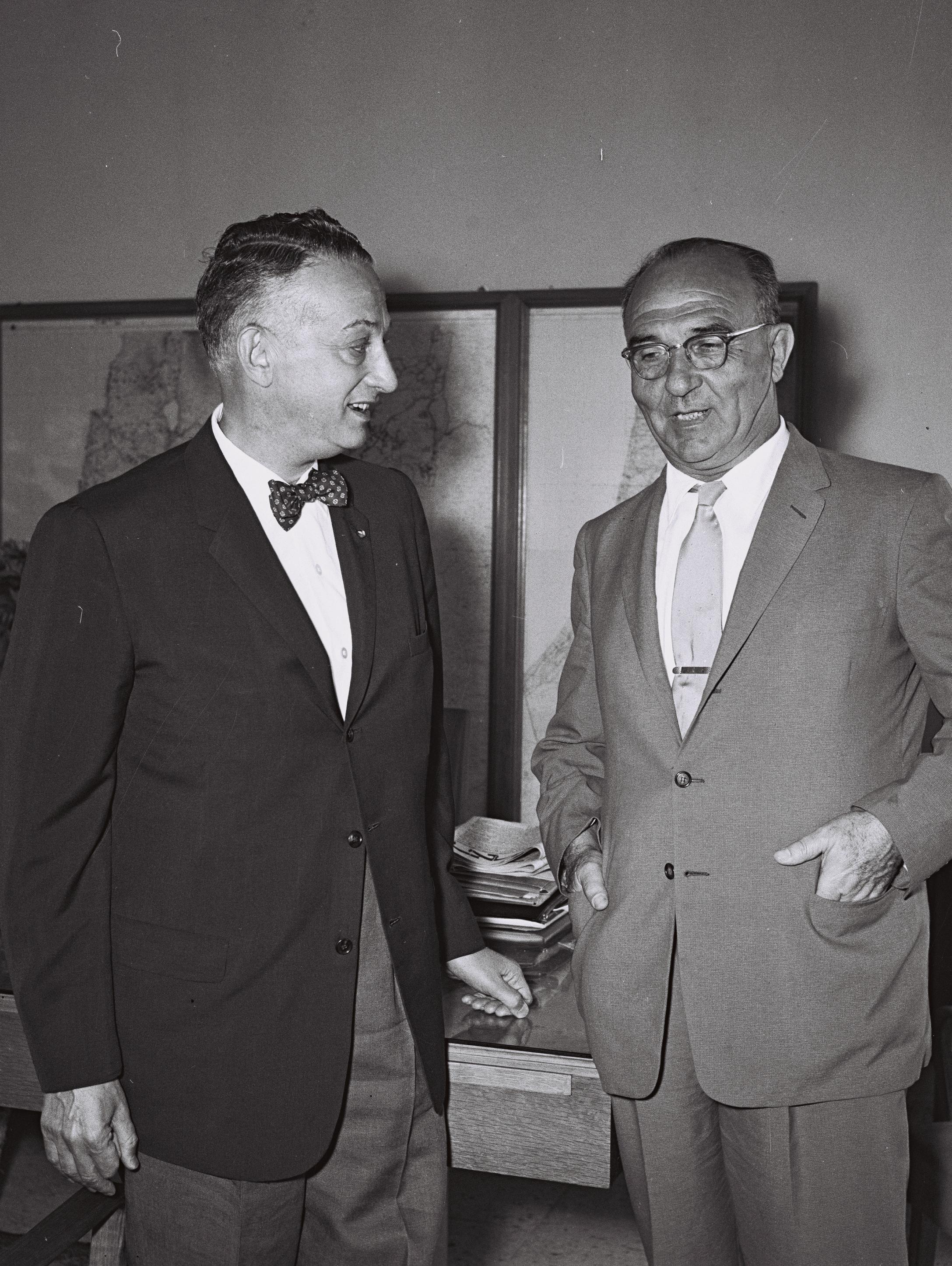
Levi Eshkol (right), Israel's Finance Minister, meeting with Arthur Levitt Sr. (left), New York State Comptroller (1959)

Following the death of Eliezer Kaplan he was appointed Finance Minister and held that position for the following 12 years. During these years, he helped form the ministry of finance, establishing the Budgets Directorate and other bodies. In 1954 he completed legislation for the establishment of the Bank of Israel.

Eshkol oversaw the implementation of Kaplan's 1952 economic plan, as well as realizing the Reparations Agreement between Israel and West Germany, which was towards its final stages of negotiation and signed in September 1952.

In 1957 he began talks with the European Economic Community towards integration of Israel in its market, ultimately achieved in 1964 with the signing of the first commercial agreement between the two entities.

In 1962 Eshkol introduced a new economic plan.

=== Party chairmanship ===
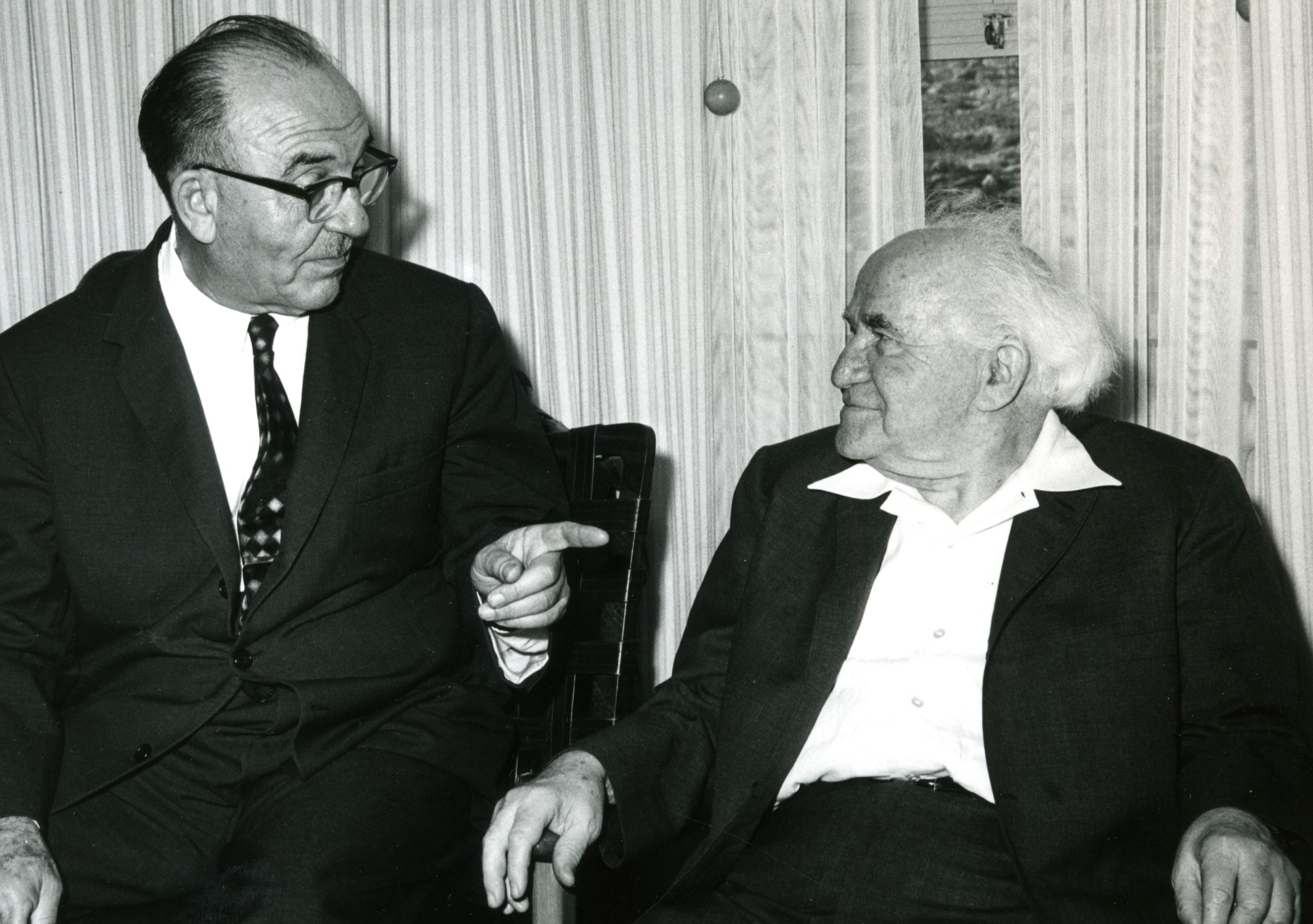
Eshkol and Ben-Gurion, June 1963

During his term as finance minister, Eshkol established himself as a prominent figure in Mapai's leadership, and was designated by Prime Minister David Ben-Gurion as his successor.

When Ben-Gurion resigned in June 1963, Eshkol was elected party chairman with a broad consensus and was subsequently appointed prime minister. However, his relationship with Ben-Gurion soon turned acrimonious over the latter's insistence on investigating the Lavon Affair, an Israeli covert operation in Egypt, which had gone wrong a decade earlier. Ben-Gurion was unsuccessful in challenging Eshkol's leadership in the 1965 Mapai leadership election and split from Mapai with a few of his young protégés to form Rafi in June 1965. In the meantime, Mapai merged with Ahdut HaAvoda to form the Alignment with Eshkol as its head. Rafi was defeated by the Alignment in the elections held in November 1965, establishing Eshkol as the country's indisputable leader. Yet Ben-Gurion, drawing on his influence as Israel's founding father, continued to undermine Eshkol's authority throughout his term as prime minister, portraying him as a spineless politician incapable of addressing Israel's security predicament.

As party chairman, Eshkol formed the basis for the Alignment in 1964, the formation of the unified Israel Labor Party in 1968 and the joining of forces with Mapam to create the second alignment in 1969.

=== Prime minister ===
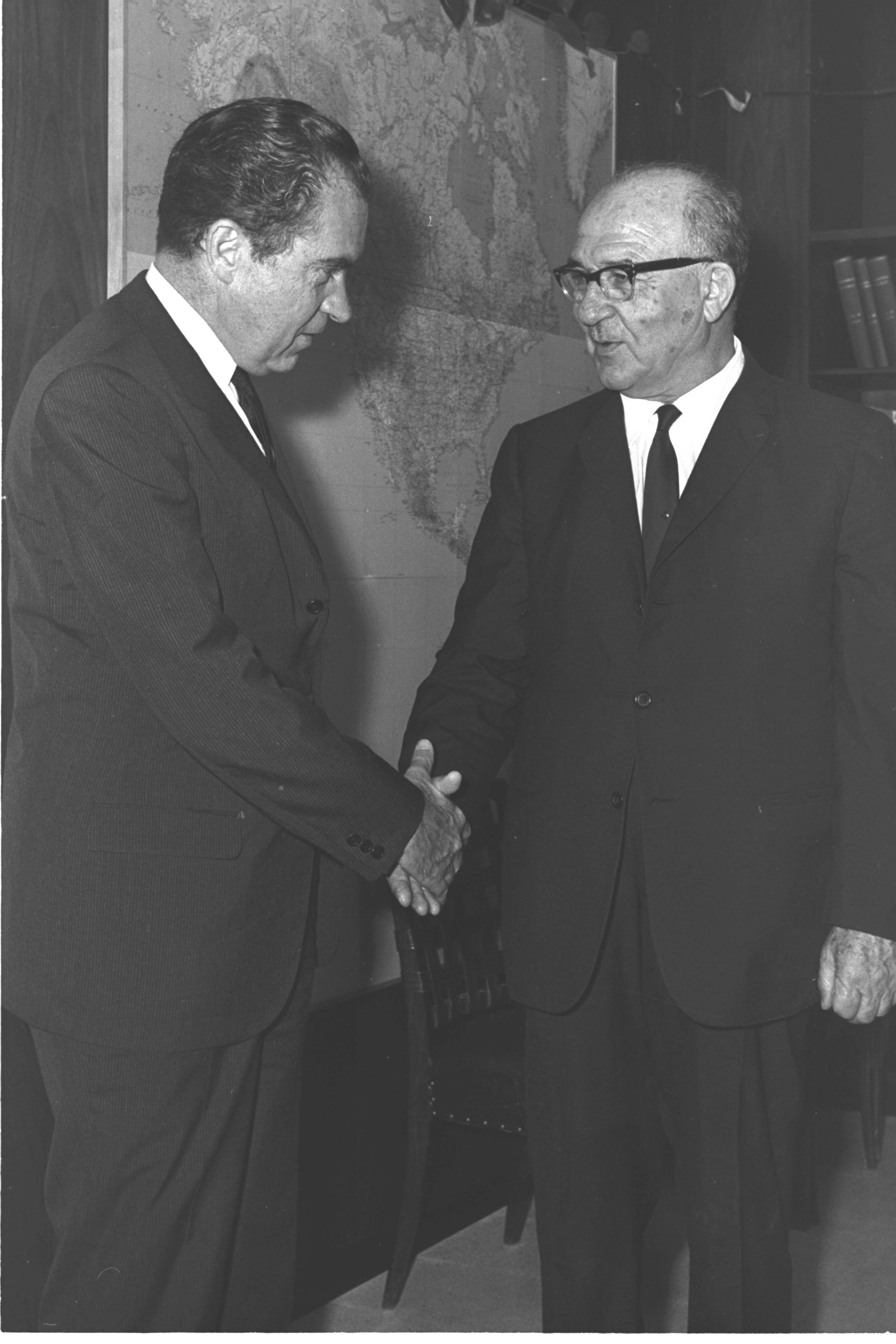
Eshkol with Richard Nixon in Jerusalem on August 2, 1966.

Eshkol formed Israel's twelfth government in 1963. His first term in office saw continuous economic growth, epitomized by the opening of the National Water Carrier system in 1964. He and Finance Minister Pinchas Sapir's subsequent "soft landing" of the overheated economy by means of recessive policies precipitated a drastic slump in economic activity. Israel's centralized planned economy lacked the mechanisms to self-regulate the slowdown, which reached levels higher than expected. Eshkol faced growing domestic unrest as unemployment reached 12% in 1966, yet the recession eventually served in healing fundamental economic deficiencies and helped fuel the ensuing recovery of 1967–1973.

Upon being elected into office, Levi Eshkol fulfilled Ze'ev Jabotinsky's wish and brought his body and that of his wife to Israel where they were buried in Mount Herzl Cemetery.

==== Foreign relations ====
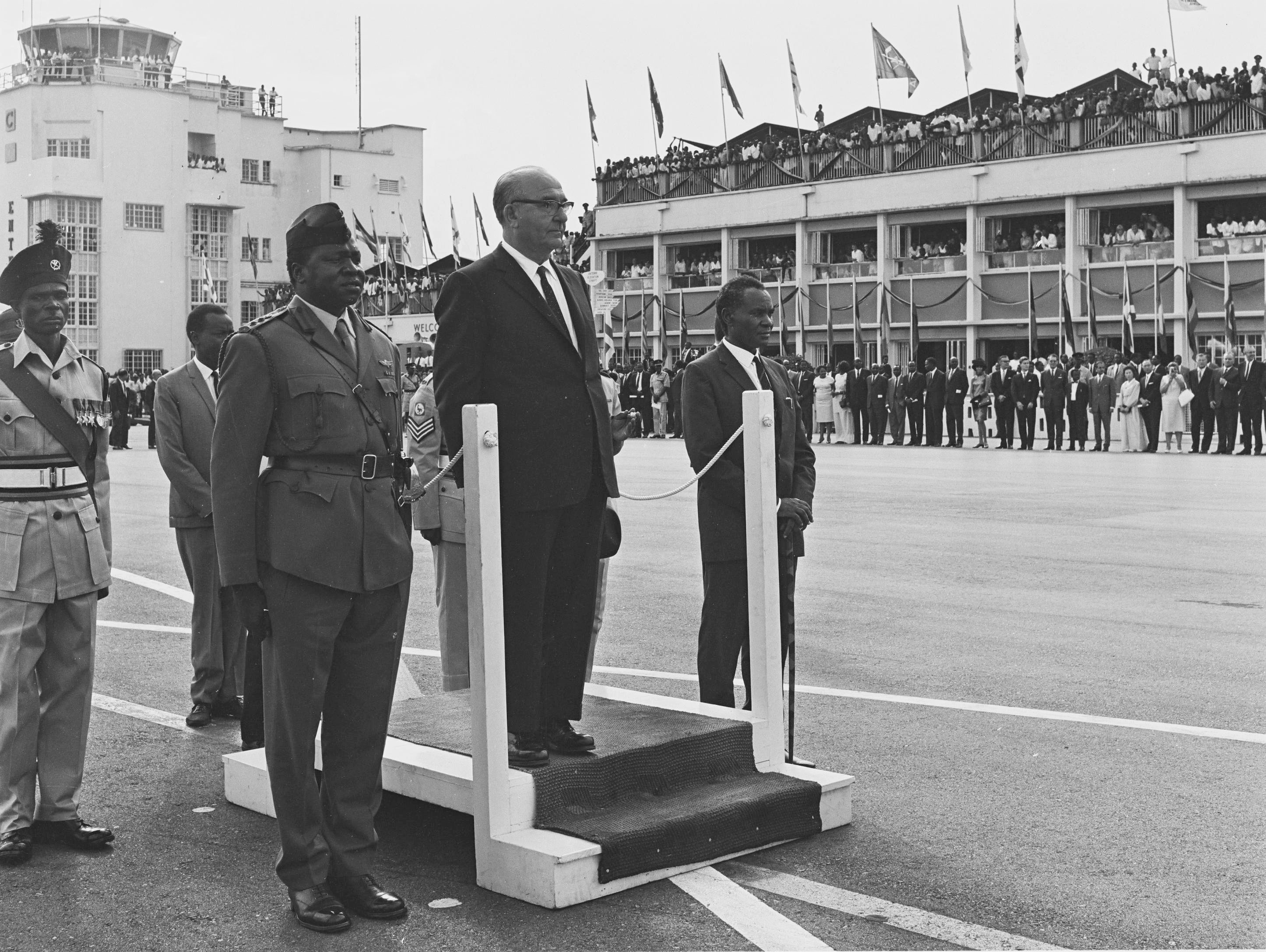
Eshkol at Entebbe during a visit to Uganda in 1966

During his first months as premier, Eshkol was engaged in a now-declassified diplomatic standoff with the United States that had begun in 1960 under Ben-Gurion. Eshkol worked to improve Israel's foreign relations by establishing diplomatic relations with West Germany in 1965, as well as cultural ties with the Soviet Union, which also allowed some Soviet Jews to immigrate to Israel. He was the first Israeli Prime Minister invited on an official state visit to the United States in May 1964.

With Johnson's administration also represented in this case by national security aide Robert W. Komer and others, Eshkol signed what became known as the Eshkol-Comer (sic) memorandum of understanding (MOU) about Israeli nuclear capabilities. The 10 March 1965 MOU, which has been variously interpreted since, stated, 'Israel would not be the first country to "introduce" nuclear weapons to the Middle East'.

==== Six-Day War ====
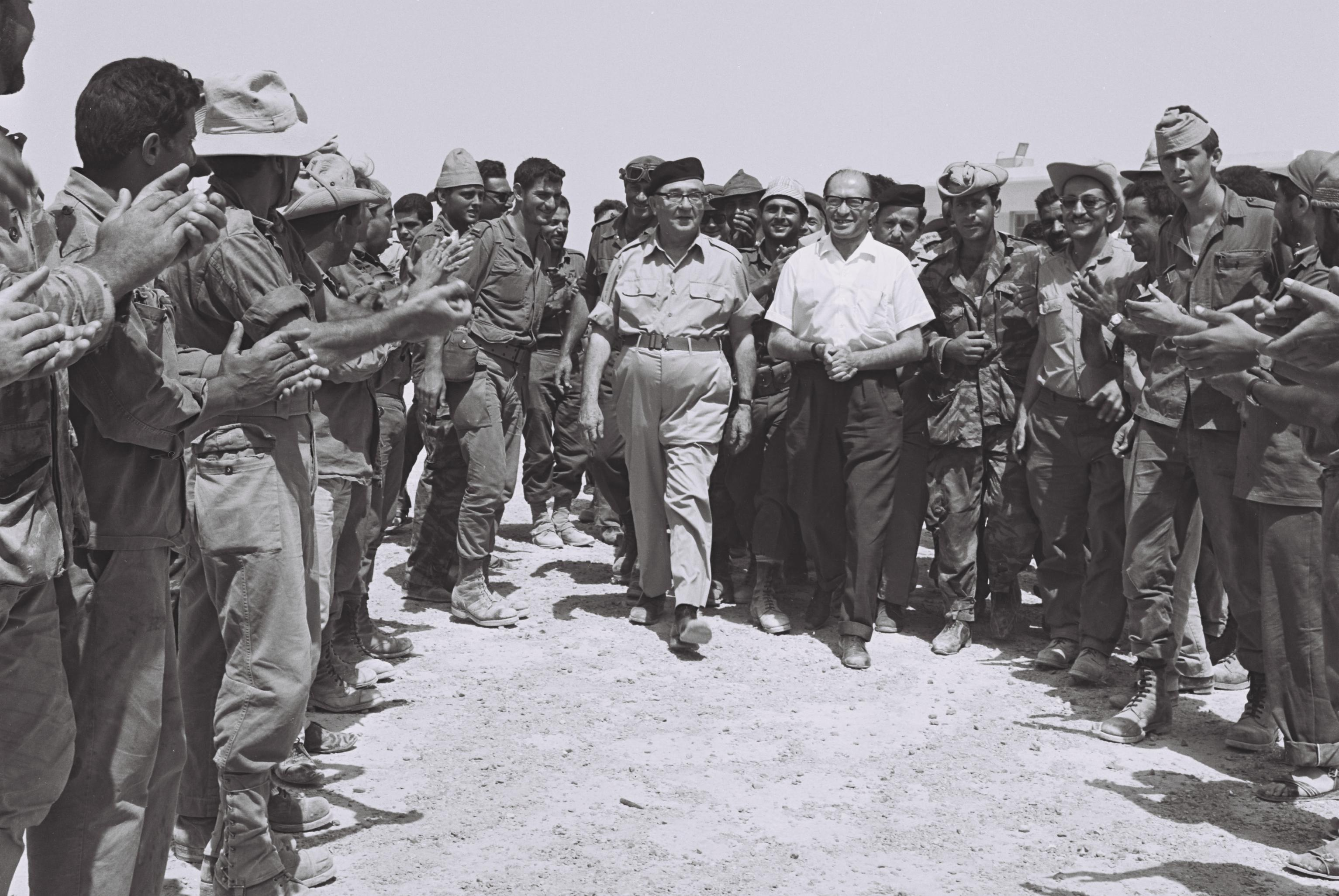
Eshkol and Menachem Begin visiting Israeli troops in Sinai shortly after the Six-Day War

The special relationship he developed with Johnson would prove pivotal in securing US political and military support for Israel during the "Waiting period" before the Six-Day War of June 1967.

According to Michael Oren, Eshkol's intransigence in the face of military pressure to launch an Israeli attack is considered to have been instrumental in increasing Israel's strategic advantage and obtaining international legitimacy, but at the time, he was perceived as hesitant, an image cemented after a stuttered radio speech on 28 May. Egyptian President Nasser's ever-increasing provocations created diplomatic support for Israel. Eshkol eventually established a National Unity Government, together with Menachem Begin's Herut party, and conceded the Defense portfolio to Moshe Dayan.

=== Death and funeral ===
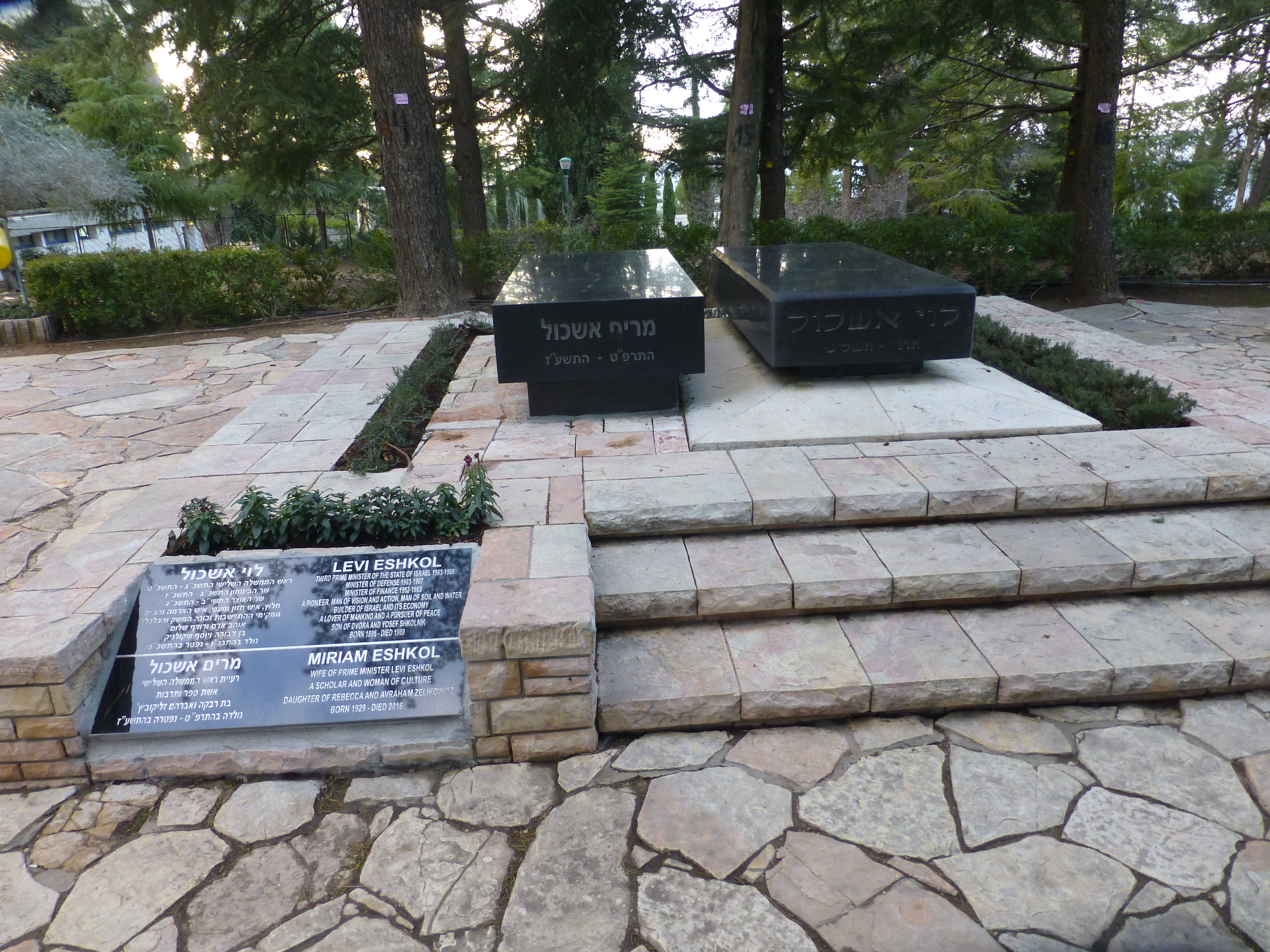
Gravesite of Levi Eshkol and his wife Miriam at Mt Herzl, Jerusalem

In the year following the war, Eshkol's health gradually declined, although he remained in power. He suffered a heart attack on 3 February 1969 from which he recovered and gradually returned to his work, maintaining meetings from the Prime Minister's official residence. In the early morning of 26 February he suffered a fatal heart attack. At his side were his wife and three physicians, including Moshe Rachmilewitz. He died in office, at the age of 73.

Eshkol was laid to rest on 28 February at Mount Herzl and was the first prime minister interred at the Great Leaders of the Nation Plot. He was the first of either presidents and prime ministers of Israel to be buried at the plot, preceded only by Eliezer Kaplan and Yosef Sprinzak.

Eshkol expressed his wishes to be buried at his Kibbutz, Deganya Bet. However, upon his passing a government meeting was convened in which the ministers expressed their support in his burial in Jerusalem. This decision was not only symbolic in its nature (following the Six-Day War), but also supported by the winter season and difficulty of performing a state funeral at the Jordan Valley as well as the War of Attrition and possible security risk at shelling aimed towards the Deganya Bet region. The government's offer was approved later that day by the Eshkol family. A second government meeting that day declared two days of national mourning, until after the state funeral. Flags across the country were brought to half mast.

Eshkol's body remained at the Prime Minister's residence in a symbolic lie in state, with an honor guard of the Israeli Police. On 27 February at 6:00, he was moved to the Knesset plaza, open to the public passing before the casket. An official state ceremony attended by dignitaries and international delegates was held in the Knesset plaza on 28 February, prior to the funeral procession to Mount Herzl.

== Personal life ==
Eshkol married three times and had four daughters:

- From his first marriage to Rivka Maharshak (1892–1950), he had a daughter, Noa (1924–2007). They were divorced in 1927.
- Eshkol married his second wife Elisheva Kaplan in 1930, with whom he had three daughters: Dvora Rafaeli (1930–2001), Tama Shochat and Ofra Nevo. His wife Elisheva died in 1959.
- In 1964 he married Miriam, a librarian at the Library of the Knesset and 35 years his junior, who died in 2016.

His eldest daughter Noa did not wed. From his second marriage Eshkol had eight grandchildren. His daughter Dvora married Eliezer Rafaeli and was the mother of three sons, including Prof. Sheizaf Rafaeli. His daughter Tama married Avraham Shochat, who succeeded him as minister of finance (1992–1996, 1999–2001), and had three children. His youngest daughter Ofra married Prof. Baruch Nevo and had two sons, including author Eshkol Nevo who was named after him.

Eshkol had three siblings. His brother Ben-Zion Shkolnik was a refusenik who made aliyah in 1964. Two other brothers, Lippa and Emanuel, remained in the Soviet Union. Emanuel Shkolnik was killed during combat in the Second World War while serving in the Red Army.

== Public recognition ==
=== Honors ===
Eshkol was given honorary citizenships of towns and cities in Israel and abroad: Philadelphia (1964), Chicago (1964), El Paso (1964), Tirat Carmel (1965), Kiryat Gat (1965), Nazareth Ilit (1965), Beer Sheva (1965), Beit Shean (1965), Afula (1965), Dimona (1967), Ashdod (1968), Jerusalem (1968), and Petah Tikva (1968)

He was awarded with honorary doctorates by the Hebrew University of Jerusalem (1964), Roosevelt University (1964), Yeshiva University (1964), University of Liberia (1966) and Hebrew Union College (1968).

=== Commemoration ===
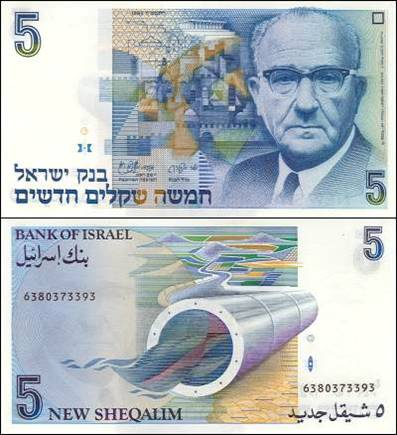
Eshkol on the 5 new sheqalim banknote

Since 1970, Yad Levi Eshkol is the official organization commemorating prime minister Eshkol. It holds educational activities in his memory, maintains his papers and personal archive, supports academic research relating to Eshkol and, since 2016, has operated the historical building in Jerusalem that served as the former prime minister's residence and now houses a visitors' center in memory of Eshkol.

Numerous national sites have been named after him:

- Eshkol Regional Council in the north-western Negev.
- Eshkol National Park near Beersheba.
- Eshkol Power Station.
- Eshkol Water Filtration Plant, the central water filtration facility of the National Water Carrier.

Streets and neighborhoods have been named in his honor, among them the Ramat Eshkol neighborhood in Jerusalem. Several schools are also named after him, including HaKfar HaYarok. The Hebrew University of Jerusalem named the Agriculture Faculty in Levi Eshkol's name, as well as established a research institute in his name in the Faculty of Social Sciences.

Israel issued in 1970 a postage stamp with a portrait of Eshkol. In 1984 his image was chosen for the five-thousand old Israeli shekel bill, replaced in 1985 by the five new Israeli shekel bill. Since 1990, his image is found on a limited, yet circulated, minting of the five new Israeli shekel coin that replaced the bill.

== Gallery ==
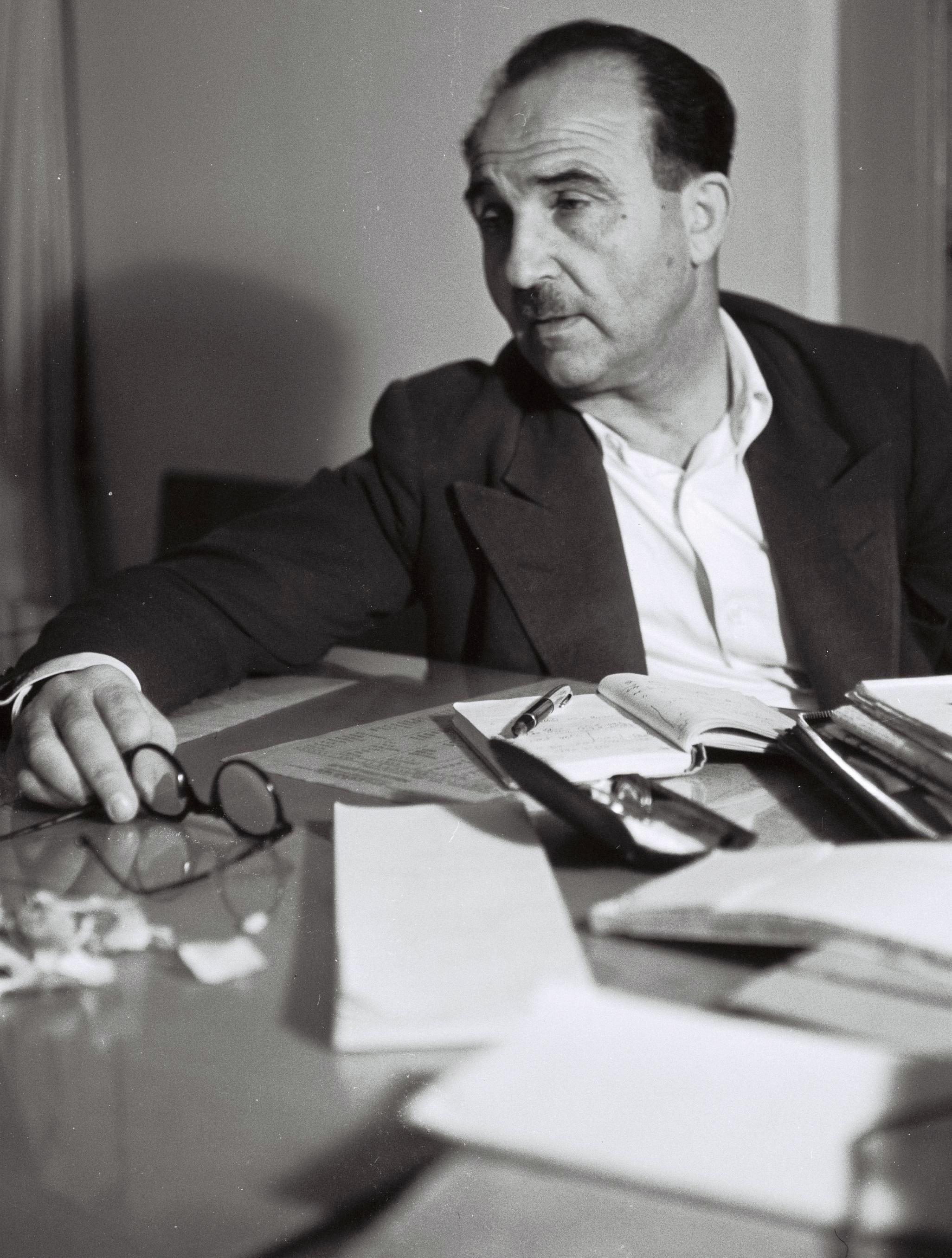
Eshkol in September 1947

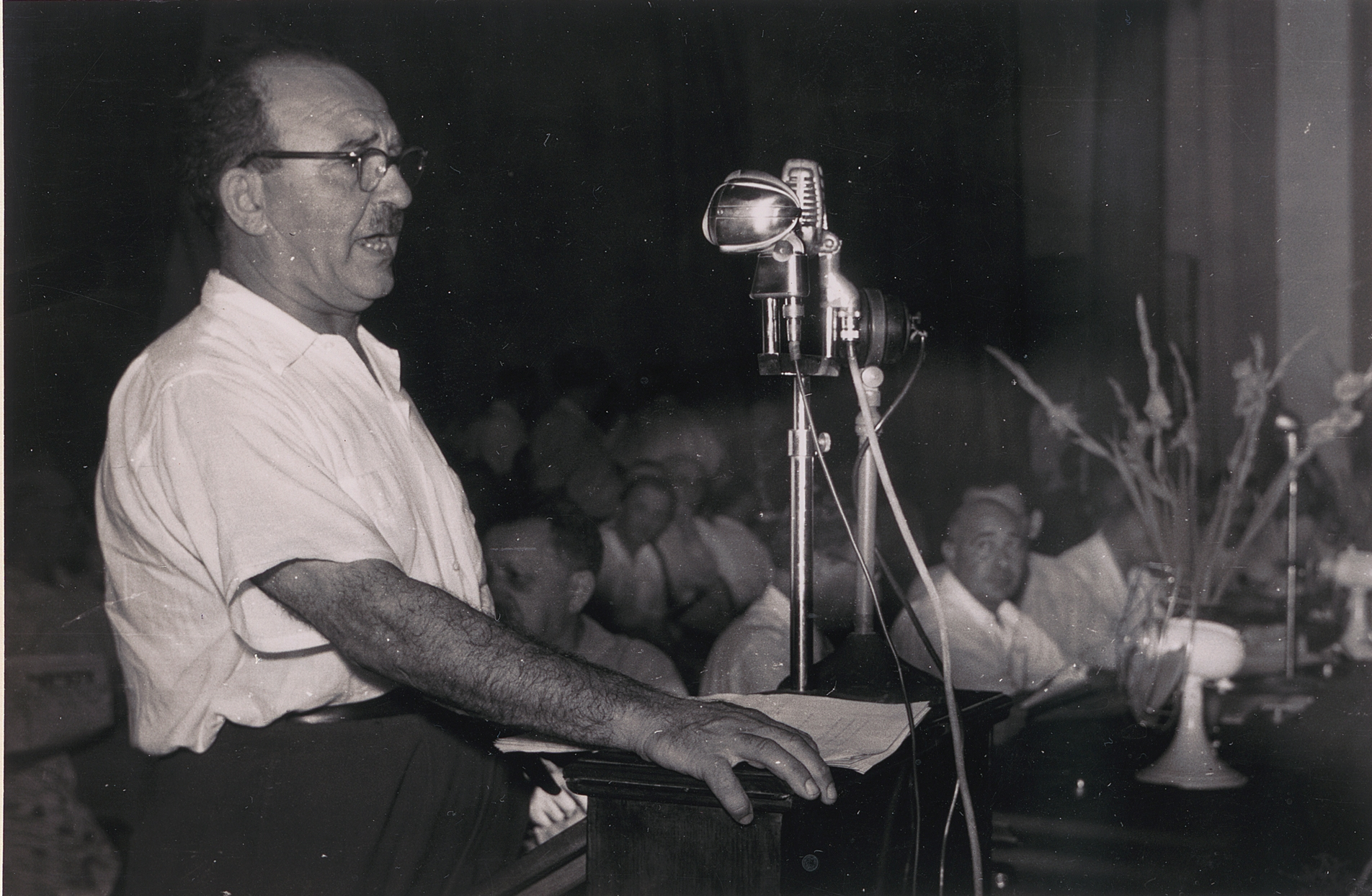
Public speaking, 1954

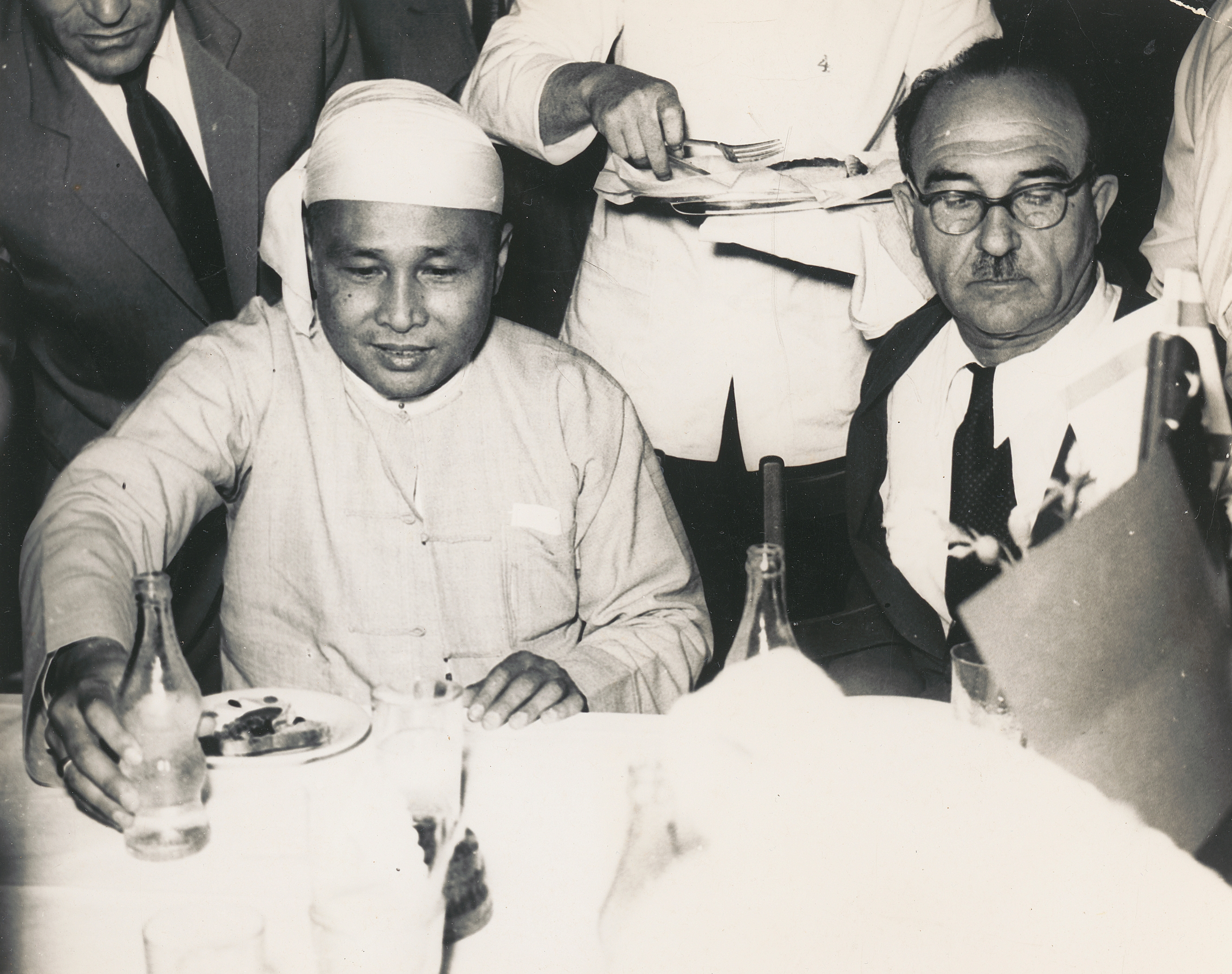
With U Nu, 1955

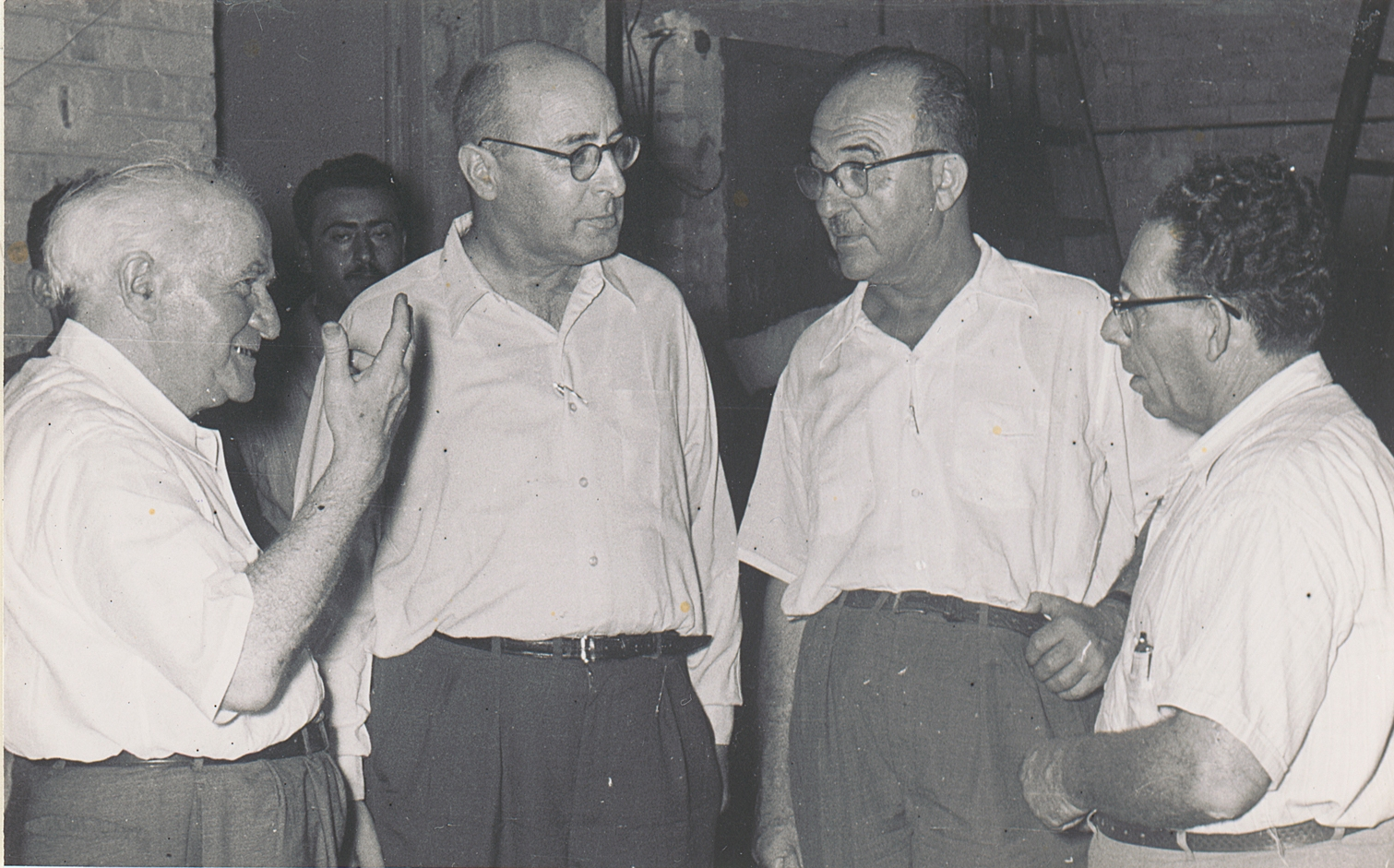
With Ben-Gurion and Pinchas Sapir, 1956

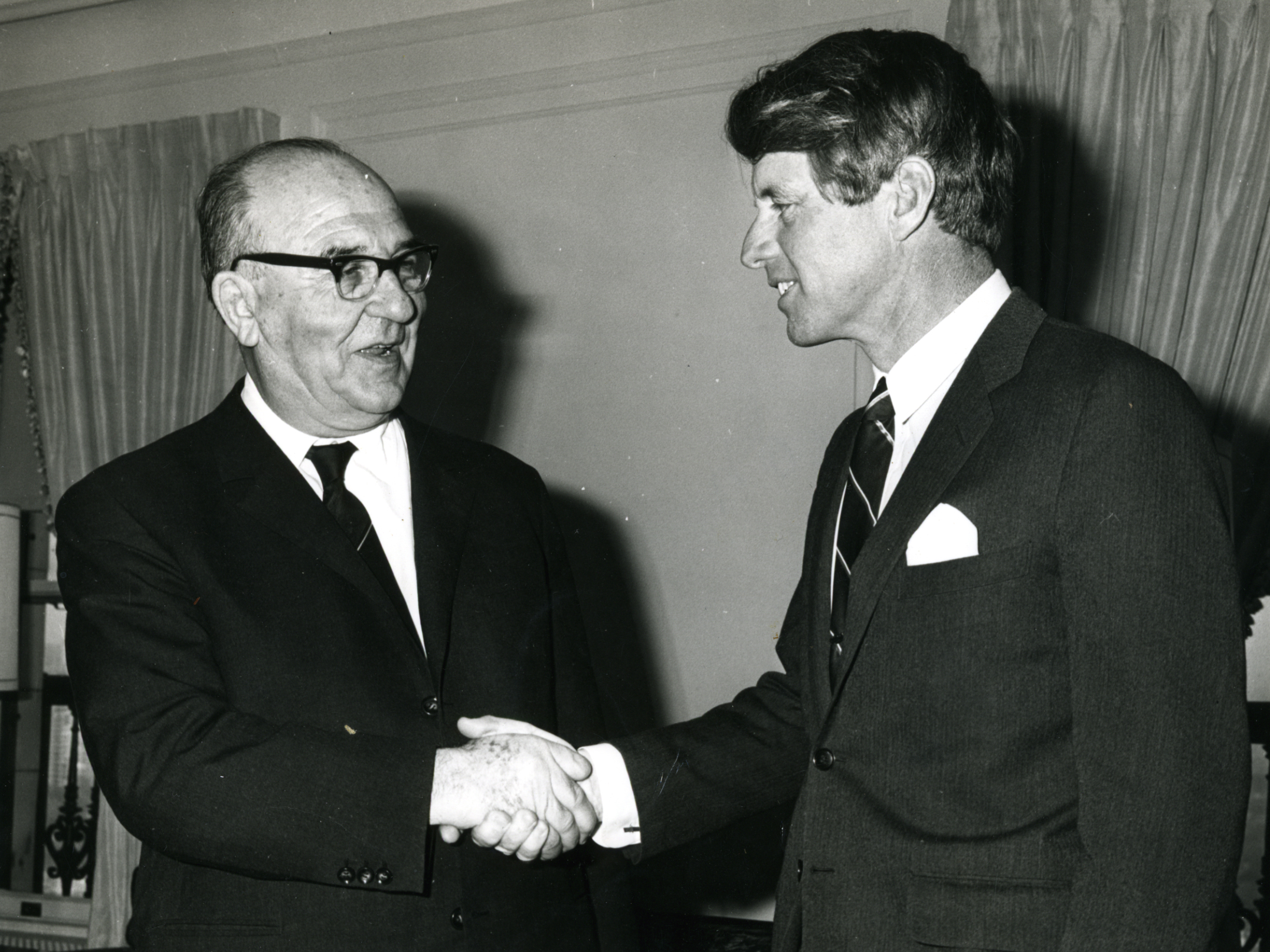
With Senator Robert F. Kennedy, 1960

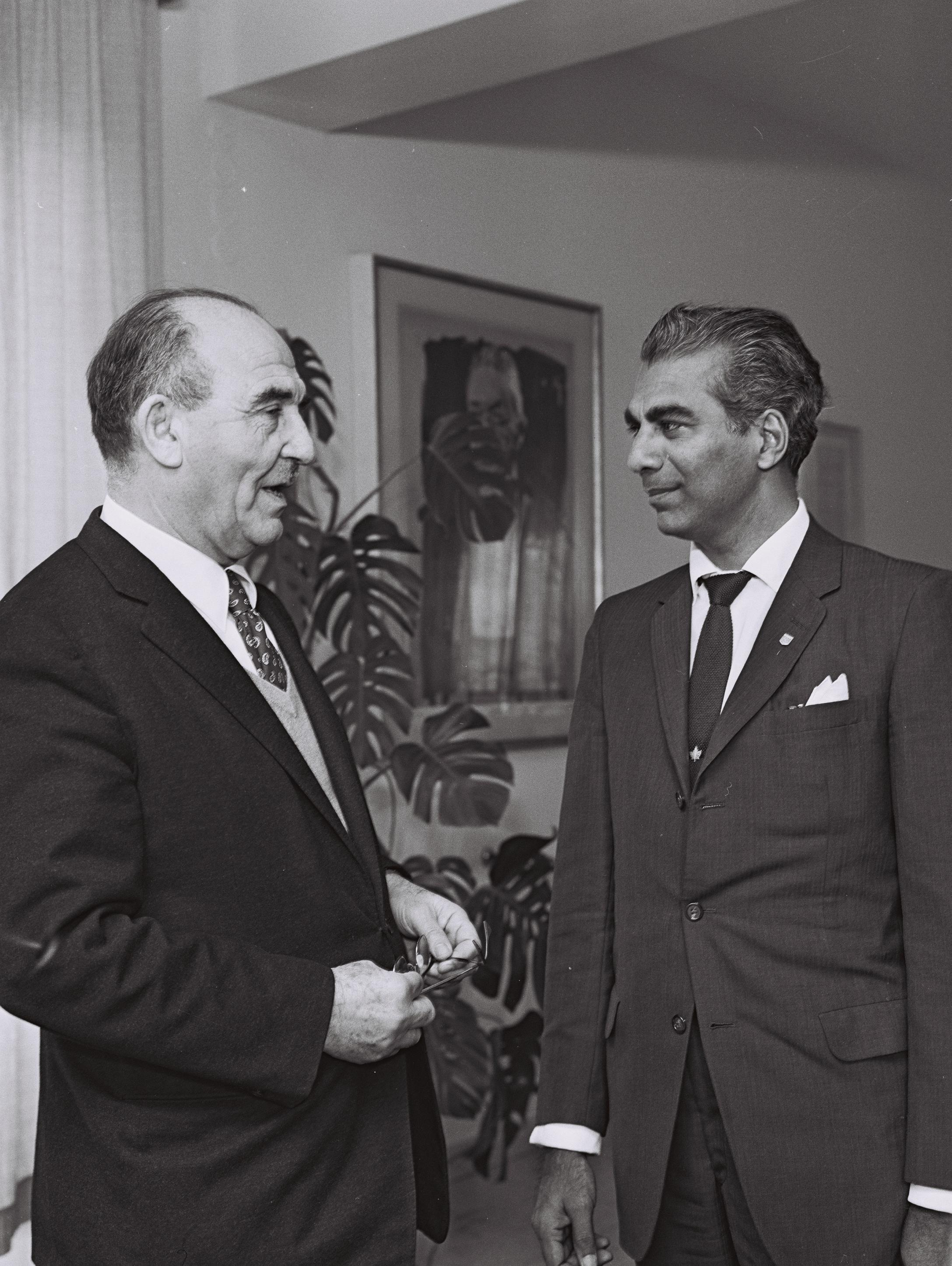
With Cheddi Jagan, 1961

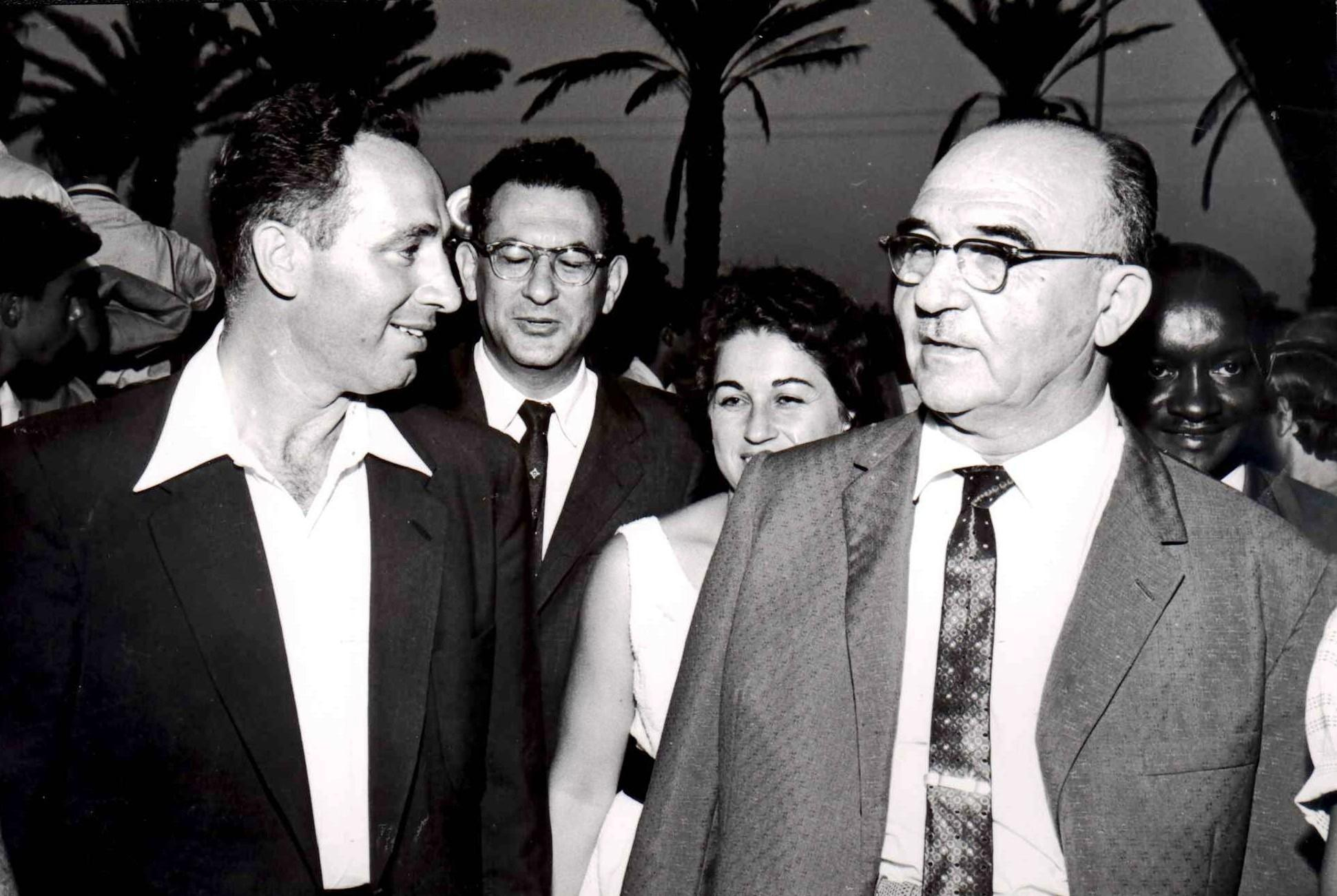
With Shimon Peres

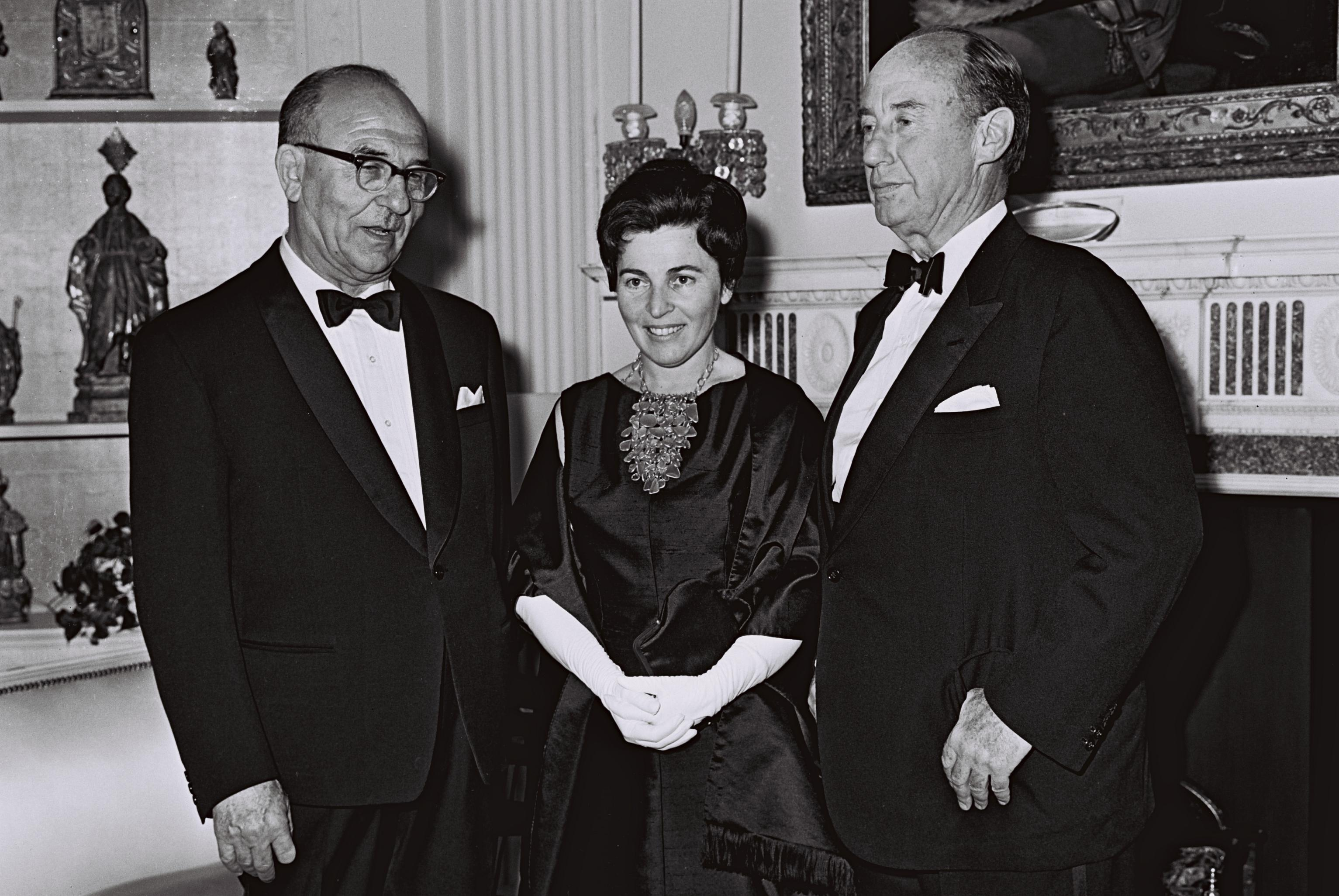
With Mrs. Eshkol and Adlai Stevenson, 1964

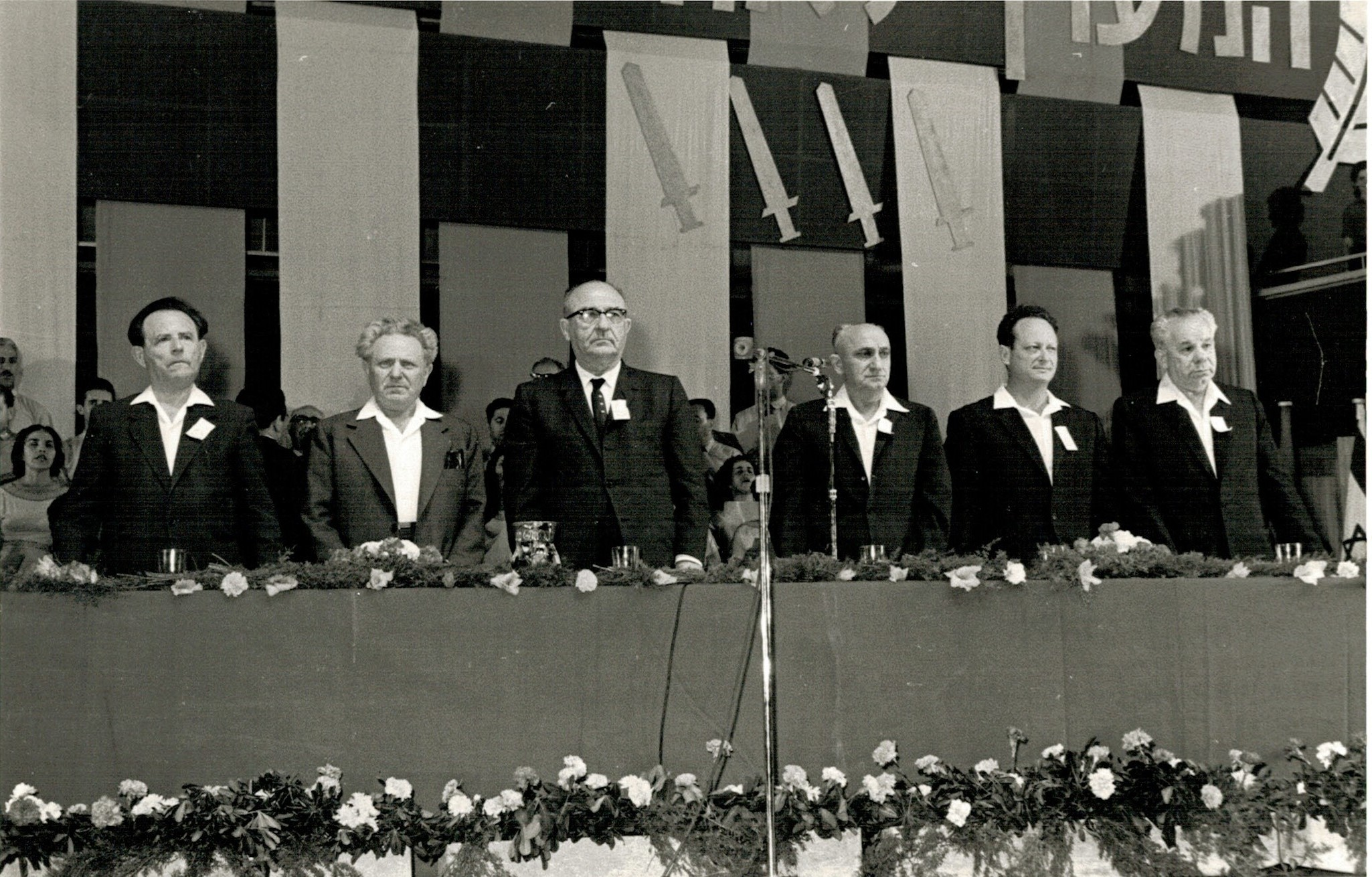
Formation of the Alignment, 1965

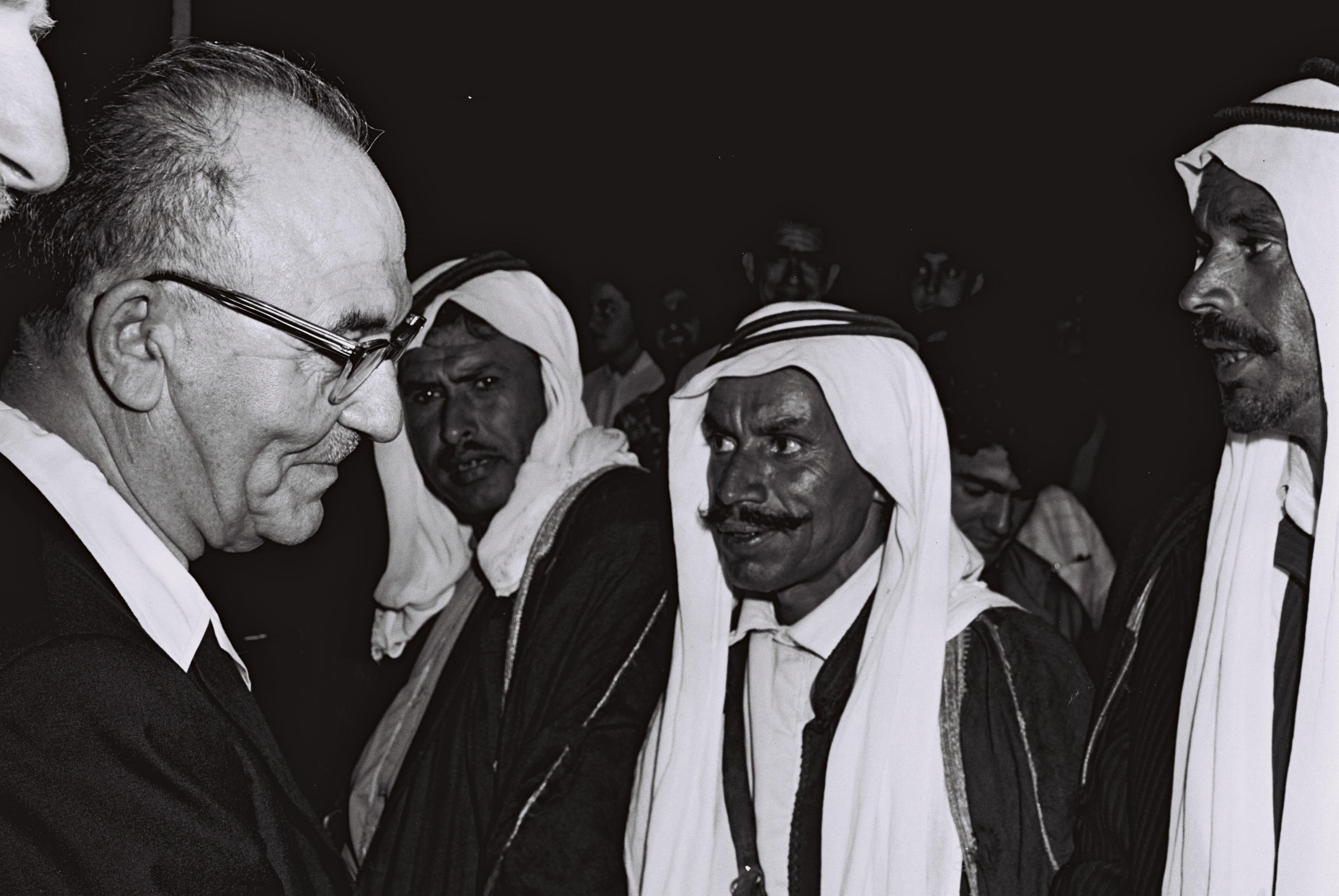
With Bedouin dignitaries, 1965

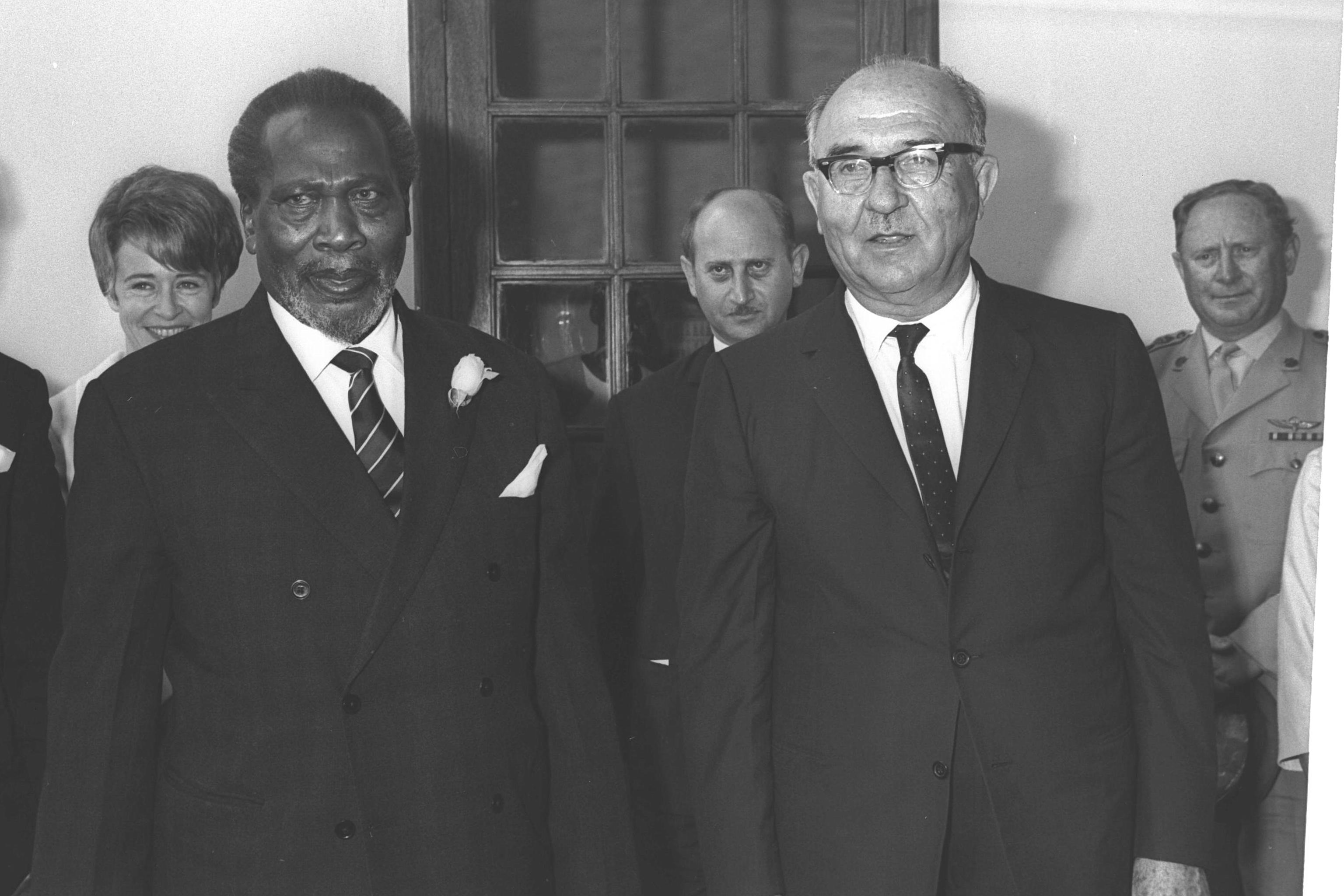
With Jomo Kenyatta, 1966

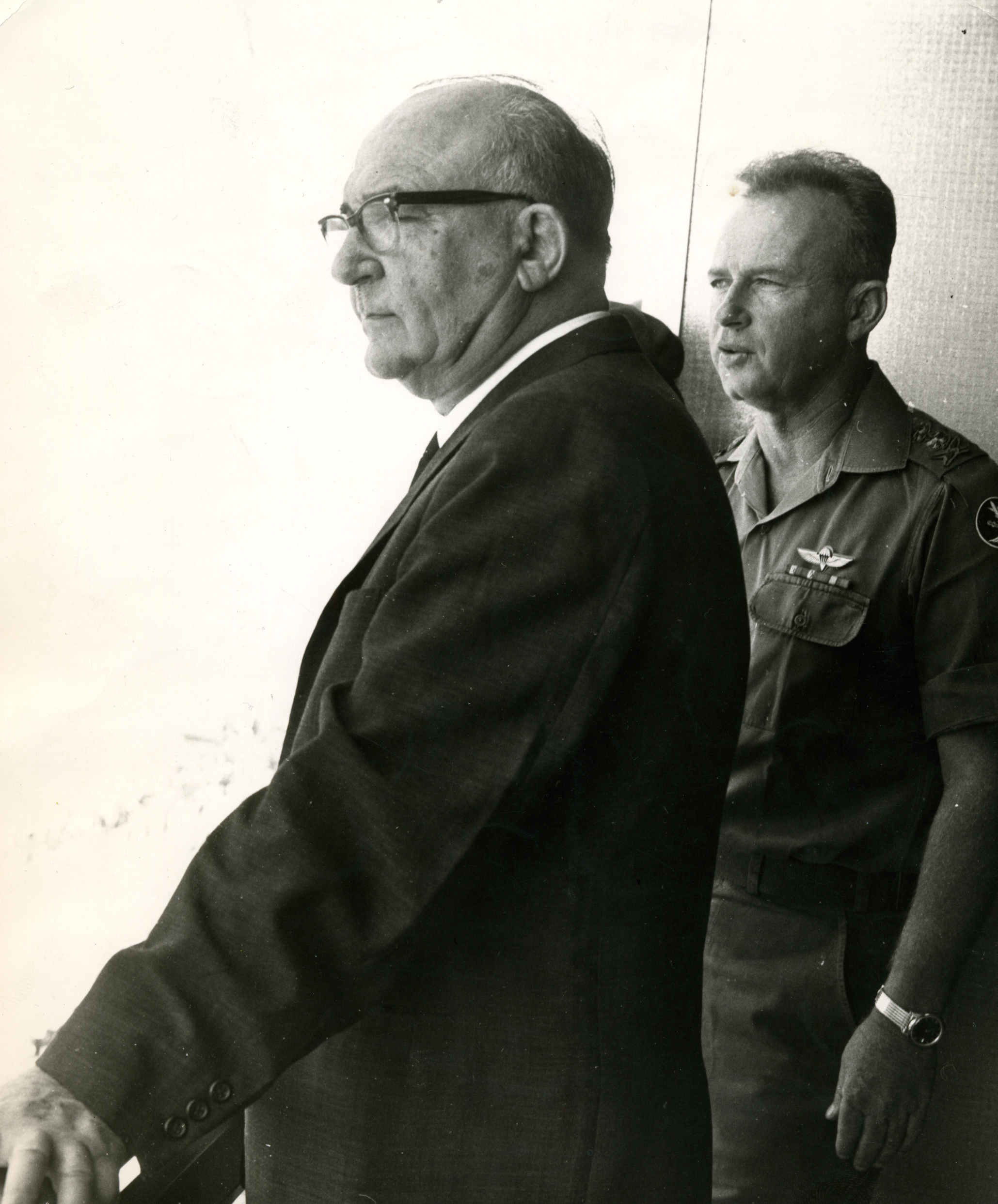
With Yitzhak Rabin, 1966

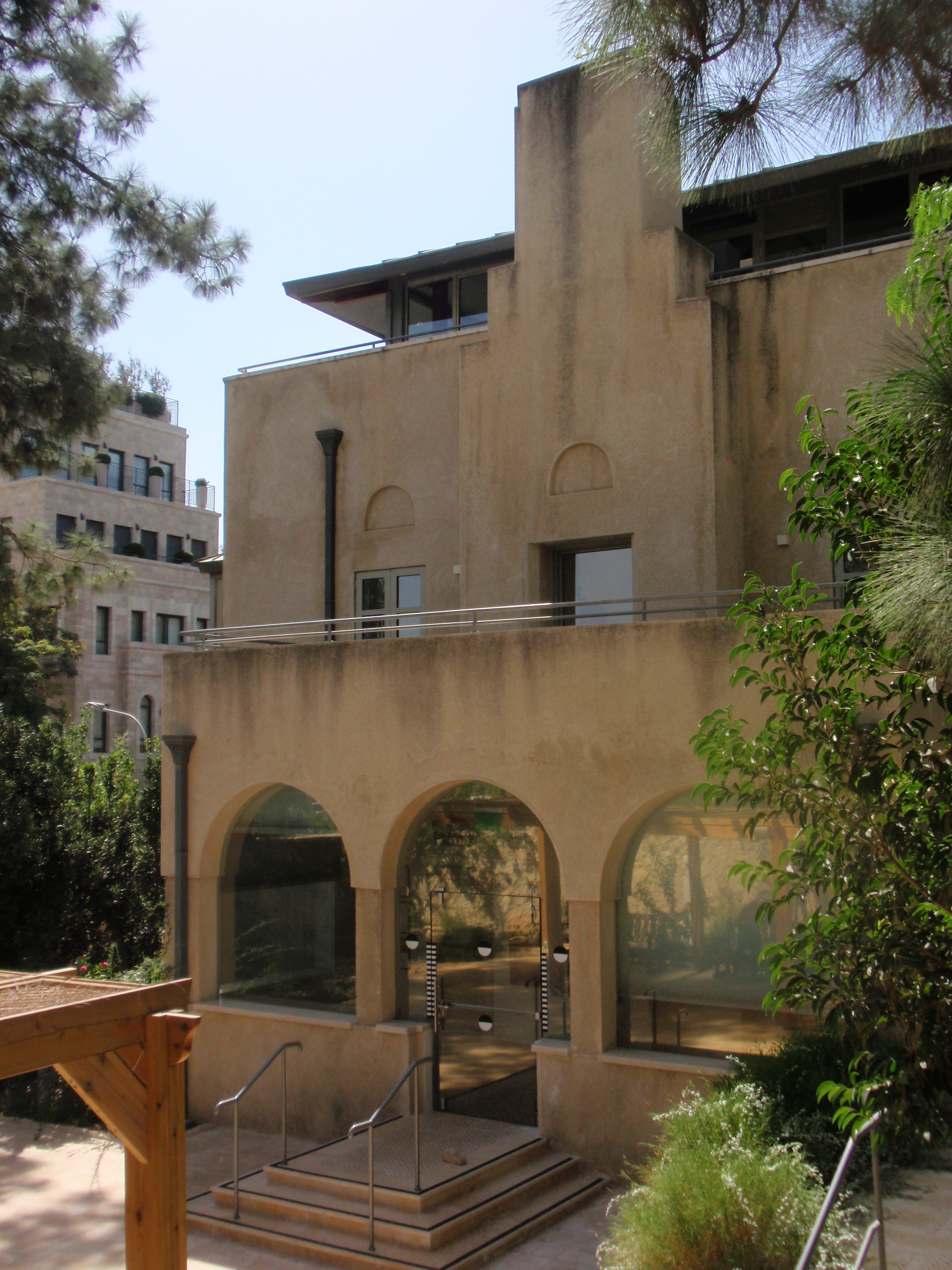
Yad Levi Eshkol in Jerusalem

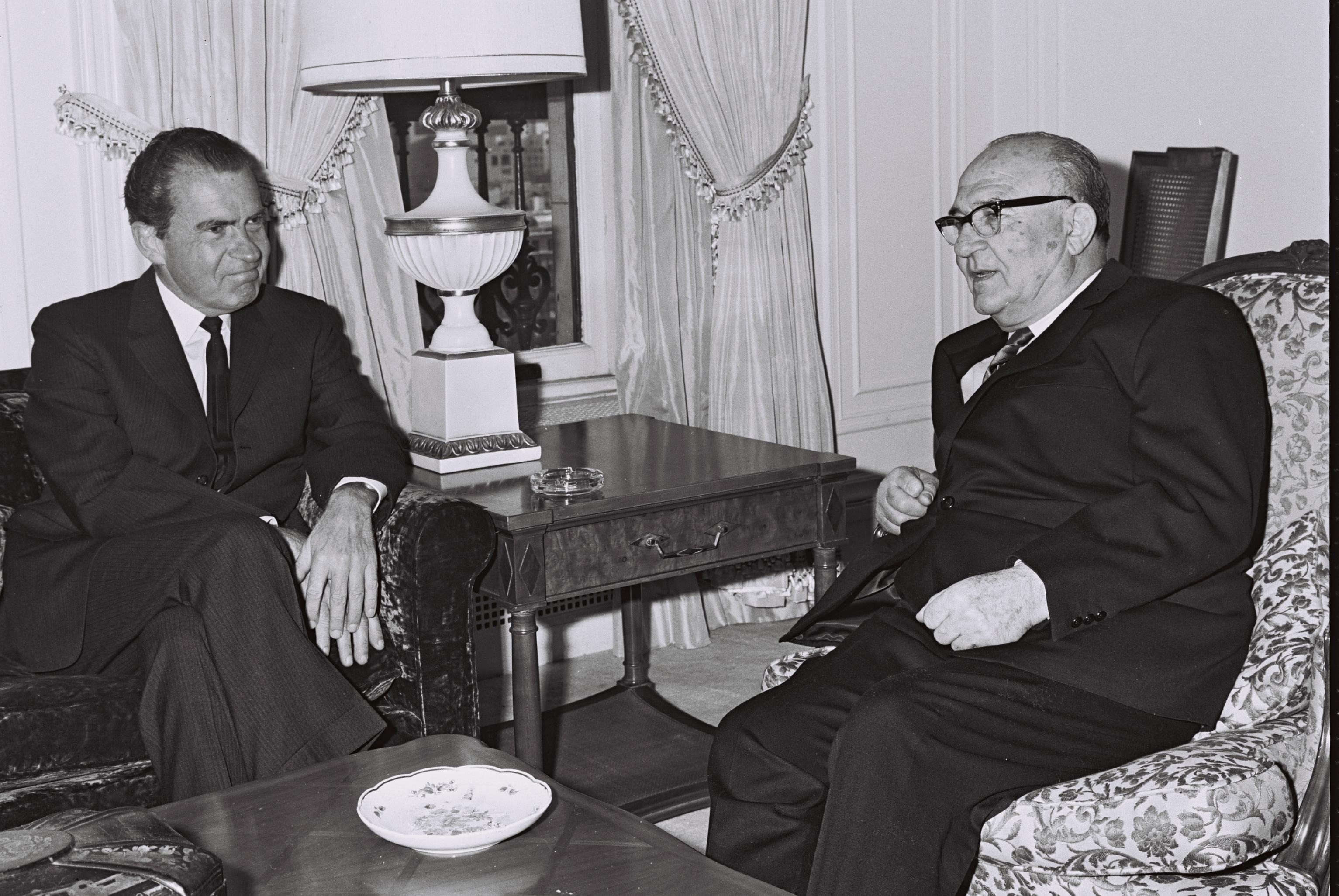
With Richard Nixon on January 10, 1968

Political offices
Preceded by Pinhas Lavon	Minister of Agriculture; 1951–1952	Succeeded by Peretz Naftali
Preceded by Eliezer Kaplan	Minister of Finance; 1952–1963	Succeeded by Pinchas Sapir
Preceded by David Ben-Gurion	Minister of Defense; 1963–1967	Succeeded by Moshe Dayan
Preceded by David Ben-Gurion	Prime Minister of Israel; 1963–1969	Succeeded by Yigal Allon; Acting
Preceded by Yosef Almogi	Minister of Construction; 1965–1966	Succeeded by Mordechai Bentov
Party political offices
Preceded by David Ben-Gurion	Leader of Mapai; 1963–1968	Party dissolved
New political party	Leader of Israel Labor Party; 1968–1969	Succeeded by Yigal Allon; Acting
