= Mileikowsky =

Mileikowsky (Russian: Милейковский, feminine Милейковская; Polish: Milejkowski, feminine Milejkowska; Hebrew: מילייקובסקי), sometimes Milikowsky or Milikovsky (Hebrew: מיליקובסקי), is an Ashkenazi Jewish surname, related to various villages named Milejków/Mileykovo, Milejki/Milyeyki, Mileikiai, or similarly, in the Russian Empire.

Notable people with the surname include:

- Benzion Netanyahu (born Benzion Mileikowsky; 1910–2012), Polish-born Israeli encyclopedist, historian and medievalist, father of Prime Minister of Israel Benjamin Netanyahu
- Elisha Netanyahu (born Elisha Mileikowsky; 1912–1986), Polish-born Israeli mathematician
- Nathan Mileikowsky (1879–1935), Russian-born Zionist political activist, Rabbi and writer, father of Benzion
- Nathan Milikowsky or Milikowski (1942–2021), American businessman and investor, cousin of Benzion
- Izrael Milejkowski (1887–1943), Polish physician and civic activist
- Roni Milo (born Roni Milikovsky, 1949), Israeli politician, lawyer and journalist

== See also ==
- Netanyahu family
