= Angela Y. Wu =

American computer scientist

Angela Yuen Wu is an American computer scientist, a professor emerita at American University. She is known for her research in computer vision and computational geometry, and especially for her highly cited publications on k-means clustering^{[KM]} and nearest neighbor search.^{[NN]} Other topics in her research include embeddings of tree-structured parallel systems into the hypercube internetwork topology^{[TH]} and voxel-based object representations.^{[DS]}

== Education ==
Wu did her undergraduate studies at Villanova University, majoring in mathematics, and earned a master's degree in mathematics from Cornell University. She completed her studies with a doctorate in computer science from the University of Maryland, College Park in 1978. Her dissertation, Cellular Graph Automata, was supervised by Azriel Rosenfeld.

== Professional service ==
Wu was the founder of the annual Vision Geometry Conference, and for many years served as the chair of the conference. She became president of Upsilon Pi Epsilon for the 2002–2003 term, and again for 2008–2009.

== Selected publications ==
TH.	Wu, Angela Y. (1985), "Embedding of tree networks into hypercubes", Journal of Parallel and Distributed Computing, 2 (3): 238–249, doi:10.1016/0743-7315(85)90026-7

DS.	Rosenfeld, Azriel; Kong, T. Yung; Wu, Angela Y. (July 1991), "Digital surfaces", CVGIP: Graphical Models and Image Processing, 53 (4): 305–312, doi:10.1016/1049-9652(91)90034-h

NN.	Arya, Sunil; Mount, David M.; Netanyahu, Nathan S.; Silverman, Ruth; Wu, Angela Y. (1998), "An optimal algorithm for approximate nearest neighbor searching in fixed dimensions", Journal of the ACM, 45 (6): 891–923, doi:10.1145/293347.293348, MR 1678846, S2CID 8193729

KM.	Kanungo, T.; Mount, D. M.; Netanyahu, N. S.; Piatko, C. D.; Silverman, R.; Wu, A. Y. (2002), "An efficient k-means clustering algorithm: analysis and implementation", IEEE Transactions on Pattern Analysis and Machine Intelligence, 24 (7): 881–892, Bibcode:2002ITPAM..24..881K, doi:10.1109/tpami.2002.1017616, S2CID 12003435
