= Yair Netanyahu =

Son of Benjamin Netanyahu (born 1991)

- יָאִיר נְתַנְיָהוּ
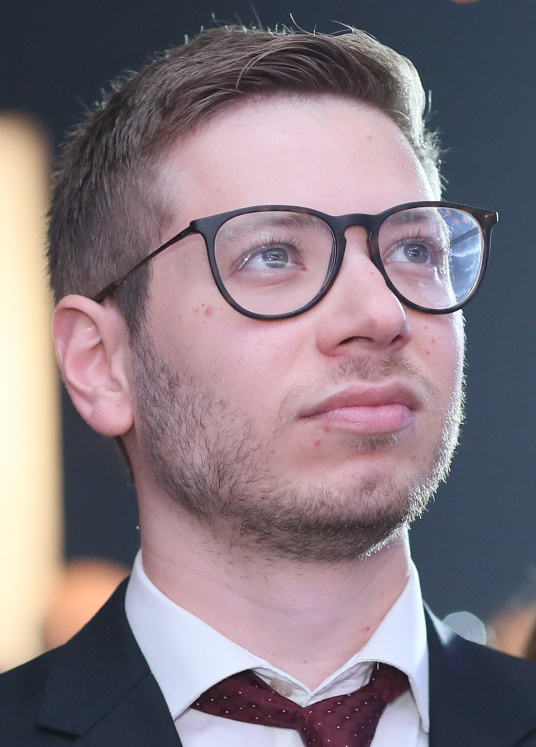
- Netanyahu in 2019
- Born: 26 July 1991 (age 35); Jerusalem, Israel
- Education: Hebrew University of Jerusalem (BA); Interdisciplinary Center Herzliya (MA)
- Occupations: Podcaster; political activist
- Political party: Likud
- Parents: Benjamin Netanyahu (father); Sara Ben-Artzi (mother)
- Relatives: Nathan Mileikowsky (great-grandfather); Benzion Netanyahu (paternal grandfather); Shmuel Ben-Artzi (maternal grandfather); Elisha Netanyahu (grand-uncle); Yonatan Netanyahu (uncle); Iddo Netanyahu (uncle); Nathan Netanyahu (first cousin once removed)
- Family: Netanyahu

Yair Netanyahu (Hebrew: יָאִיר נְתַנְיָהוּ; born 26 July 1991) also known as Yonatan Hun, is an Israeli podcaster and political activist. He is the second child of Prime Minister Benjamin Netanyahu.

== Biography ==
Yair Netanyahu was born on 26 July 1991 in Jerusalem to Benjamin Netanyahu and his wife Sara. He has a brother, Avner Netanyahu, and a half-sister, Noa Netanyahu-Roth; Noa is Benjamin Netanyahu's daughter by his first wife, Miriam Haran née Weizmann.

Netanyahu majored in theatre at the High School for the Arts in Jerusalem before serving in the IDF Spokesperson's Unit. He previously worked as social media director for Shurat HaDin, an Israeli NGO that provides legal services to victims of terrorist attacks. After finishing his army service, Netanyahu studied international relations at the Hebrew University of Jerusalem, graduating with a Bachelor of Arts degree in International Relations. Netanyahu also studied at the Interdisciplinary Center (IDC) in Herzliya and graduated with a Master of Arts degree in Government Studies.

Netanyahu lived with his parents at Beit Aghion, the prime minister's official residence in Rehavia, Jerusalem. They left after Benjamin Netanyahu was ousted as prime minister in 2021.

In January 2014, a Norwegian newspaper reported that Netanyahu was dating Sandra Leikanger, a Norwegian student. The couple had met while they were students at the Interdisciplinary Center in Herzliya. The news triggered outrage because Leikanger was not Jewish. In 2015, Netanyahu briefly dated Lee Levi, a Danish-Israeli model and student.

In November 2020, Netanyahu launched his own right-wing podcast called The Yair Netanyahu Show, with episodes in both English and Hebrew. His first guest was Brazilian politician Eduardo Bolsonaro, the third son of Brazilian president Jair Bolsonaro.

In June 2022, Netanyahu received his press card from the Israeli Government Press Office.

On 9 June 2024, the Netanyahu family asked the Security Advisory Committee to secure Benjamin Netanyahu's family by the Shin Bet, for the rest of their lives in a similar manner to how Benjamin Netanyahu is secured. The request included Sara, Yair and Avner. At the meeting it was decided not to discuss this while a war was going on.

During a session of the Knesset Finance Committee on 23 February 2025, members of the opposition inquired whether state funds were still being allocated for the security detail of Yair Netanyahu in Miami, Florida, United States—including a chauffeur and bodyguards from Shin Bet's Unit 730—as well as for Sara Netanyahu. They also requested clarification on which specific budget these expenses were being drawn from. Opposition members alleged that Yair Netanyahu had been sent abroad after an incident in which he reportedly struck his father, and claimed he remained outside the country due to having disrespected a symbol of state authority. Netanyahu's Likud party described this statement as "a despicable lie".

In late October 2025, the ruling Likud party put forward Netanyahu for a position on the board of directors of the World Zionist Organization. The decision regarding Netanyahu's appointment as the head of the Hasbara branch was delayed by two weeks. In reaction, the opposition parties Yesh Atid and the Democrats declared that they would withdraw their consent to any agreement concerning the future leaders of the WZO and the Jewish National Fund-KKL.

== Views and opinions ==
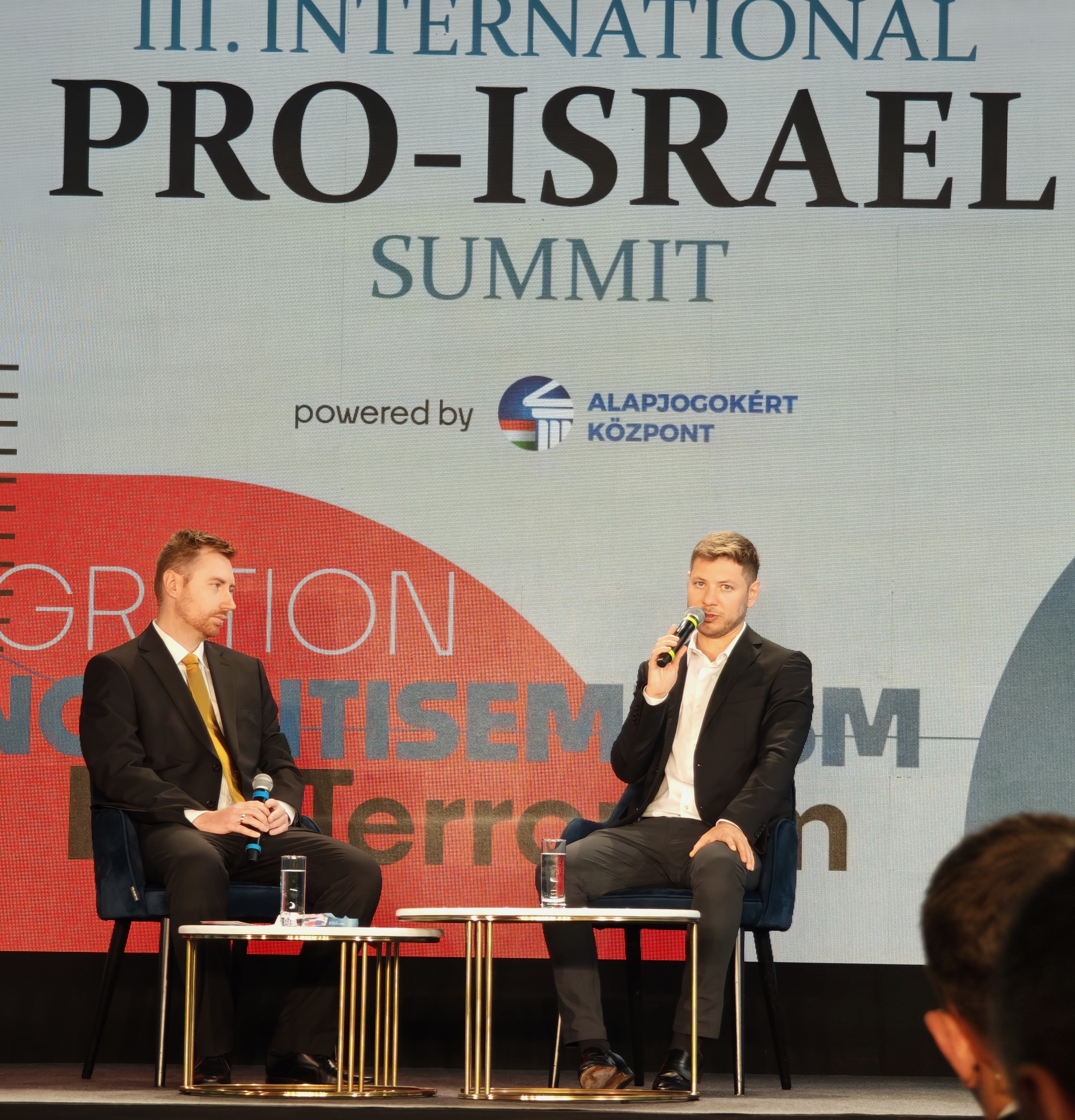
Speaking at International Pro-Israel Summit 2025

According to Haaretz, Netanyahu uses social media "for the benefit of spreading lies, defamation and slander against those who are perceived in his eyes as enemies of the camp headed by his father". He is known for defending his father on social media. Netanyahu has also published his opinions in Breitbart News, an American far-right news and opinion website. In late 2017, Netanyahu posted a meme on Facebook portraying his father's political opponents as puppets controlled by George Soros in spite of the meme's sordid history; the meme garnered support from US white nationalists, including David Duke, and neo-Nazi website The Daily Stormer which described itself as "The World's #1 Yair Netanyahu fansite". Netanyahu later deleted the post following backlash.

In December 2018, he was suspended from Facebook for 24 hours after posting anti-Muslim content. One of Netanyahu's comments read: "There will never be peace with those monsters in the form of men that have called themselves 'Palestinians' since 1964".

In March 2019, he was asked to leave his work at the Israel Law Center, an NGO that provides legal services to terror victims, after criticizing President Reuven Rivlin for his efforts on behalf of Arab-Israeli coexistence.

In May 2019, Netanyahu expressed support for right-wing nationalist figures Viktor Orbán, Matteo Salvini, Nigel Farage and Geert Wilders in the 2019 European Parliament election. In the same month, some observers hypothesized that Netanyahu was looking for a job in the Ministry of Foreign Affairs, although Netanyahu has denied that he is looking for a political career. In June 2019, Netanyahu met with Katrina Pierson, a senior advisor for Donald Trump's 2020 presidential campaign.

In July 2019, Netanyahu expressed support for British anti-Muslim activist Tommy Robinson, during the latter's imprisonment by British authorities.

In September 2019, Netanyahu accused former Israeli prime minister Yitzhak Rabin, who was assassinated in 1995, of having "murdered Holocaust survivors on the Altalena". The comments were disavowed by his father. He has compared Roni Alsheikh, the Israel Police chief who played a role in the Netanyahu corruption investigations, to the fictional mobster Tony Soprano. While being questioned by police during the investigations, Netanyahu called the police "Stasi" and "Gestapo" and said they were worse than the mafia. He also accused Nir Hafetz and Gideon Saar of various crimes.

In May 2020, the far-right politician and Alternative for Germany (AfD) member Joachim Kuhs used a quote from Netanyahu in his campaign graphics. Following this, Netanyahu urged the AfD to work towards stopping German funding for NGOs operating in Israel.

During the 2021 Israel–Palestine crisis, Netanyahu claimed a 2013 video from Egypt was an example of Pallywood and showed Palestinians faking their casualties.

After the Israeli military police in July 2024 visited Sde Teiman detention camp to detain nine Israeli soldiers suspected of abuse of a Palestinian prisoner, Netanyahu commented that the prosecution of the soldiers was "criminal and anti-Zionist".

== Legal issues ==
In January 2018, a scandal erupted when a recording of Netanyahu's visit to a Tel Aviv strip club in 2015 was leaked. In the recording, Netanyahu discussed strippers and referred to a controversial gas deal recently passed into law. Netanyahu apologized for his remarks. He filed a lawsuit for 1 million NIS ($272,000) against his driver, who allegedly recorded the conversation.

On 7 July 2019, he won a libel suit against Israeli Labor Party activist Abie Binyamin for claiming that Netanyahu was hiding millions in offshore accounts.

In November 2019, Netanyahu was sued for slander after sharing a Facebook post claiming that former Walla news site editor Avi Alkalay was a plant for the Wexner Foundation. In February 2020, he was ordered to pay damages and legal costs totalling $81,000. Netanyahu appealed the decision, but his appeal was rejected by the Tel Aviv Magistrate's Court in July 2021.

In January 2025, an appeal of a lawsuit previously filed by Yair Netanyahu against former Knesset member Stav Shaffir for publicly calling him "a liar, an evil man, a racist and a sexual-abuser" was rejected by the court, and Netanyahu was forced to compensate Shaffir for her legal fees, in addition to compensation after losing the initial court case.
