= The Netanyahus =

2021 novel by Joshua Cohen

- NYRB first edition cover
- Author: Joshua Cohen
- Cover artist: Anonymous photo c. 1955, Design by Katy Homans
- Language: English
- Genre: Historical, Satire
- Publisher: Fitzcarraldo Editions (UK); NYRB (US)
- Publication date: May 5, 2021 (UK); June 22, 2021 (US)
- Publication place: United States
- Media type: Print (Paperback)
- Pages: 248 pp
- ISBN: 9781681376073

The Netanyahus: An Account of a Minor and Ultimately Even Negligible Episode in the History of a Very Famous Family is a 2021 novel by Joshua Cohen. It was awarded the 2022 Pulitzer Prize for Fiction.

The book centers on a fictionalized account of Harold Bloom's encounter with Benzion Netanyahu and his family, including his son, Benjamin Netanyahu, at an upstate New York college in the late 1950s, blending history, fiction, and humor.

== Synopsis ==
The novel's protagonist, Ruben Blum, is a historian at the fictional Corbin College in the fictional town of Corbindale, New York in the late 1950s. He is the first and only Jewish person at Corbin.

He finds himself perpetually navigating microaggressions of his department chair, Dr. Morse. One of the humiliating incidents involves making Blum portray Santa Claus at the college's Christmas party because “it’ll free up the people who actually celebrate the holiday to enjoy themselves.”

Because he is Jewish, Dr. Morse involuntarily appoints Blum to the hiring committee for a Jewish historian by the name of Benzion Netanyahu. The hiring committee assignment takes an unexpected twist when Benzion arrives for lunch at Blum's residence, not alone but with the unannounced company of his audacious wife and three feral children (Yonatan, Benjamin, and Iddo). The Netanyahus' visit shakes up Ruben's life, leaving him to navigate a whirlwind of events beyond his control.

== Audiobook ==
The audiobook version published by Pushkin Industries is read by the author with contributions from David Duchovny and Ethan Herschenfeld.

== Reception and accolades ==
=== Critical reception ===
In a positive review for The New York Times Book Review, Taffy Brodesser-Akner referred to the novel as "an infuriating, frustrating, pretentious piece of work — and also absorbing, delightful, hilarious, breathtaking and the best and most relevant novel I’ve read in what feels like forever". David Isaacs praised Cohen's wit at the sentence level but questioned his success in conveying a sense of depth, describing the novel in Literary Review as "erudite, occasionally hilarious and eventually unhinged."

=== Awards and honors ===
The Netanyahus won the 2022 Pulitzer Prize for Fiction. The Pulitzer citation for the novel described it as "A mordant, linguistically deft historical novel about the ambiguities of the Jewish-American experience, presenting ideas and disputes as volatile as its tightly-wound plot." It also won the 2021 National Jewish Book Award for Fiction.
