= Ruth Silverman =

American mathematician

- Born: 1936 or 1937
- Died: April 25, 2011, age 74

Academic background
- Education: University of Washington
- Thesis: Decomposition of plane convex sets

Academic work
- Discipline: Mathematics
- Sub-discipline: computational geometry
- Institutions: New Jersey Institute of Technology, Southern Connecticut State College, University of the District of Columbia, University of Maryland, College Park

Ruth Silverman (born 1936 or 1937, died April 25, 2011) was an American mathematician and computer scientist known for her research in computational geometry. She was one of the original founders of the Association for Women in Mathematics in 1971.

== Education and career ==
Silverman completed a Ph.D. in 1970 at the University of Washington. She was a faculty member at the New Jersey Institute of Technology, an associate professor at Southern Connecticut State College, a computer science instructor at the University of the District of Columbia, and a researcher in the Center for Automation Research at the University of Maryland, College Park.

== Contributions ==
Silverman's dissertation, Decomposition of plane convex sets, concerned the characterization of compact convex sets in the Euclidean plane that cannot be formed as Minkowski sums of simpler sets.

She became known for her research in computational geometry and particularly for highly cited publications on k-means clustering^{[KM]} and nearest neighbor search.^{[NN]} Other topics in Silverman's research include robust statistics^{[LT]} and small sets of points that meet every line in finite projective planes.^{[IP]}

== Selected publications ==
| IP. | Erdős, P.; Silverman, R.; Stein, A. (1983), "Intersection properties of families containing sets of nearly the same size", Ars Combinatoria, 15: 247–259, MR 0706303 |

| NN. | Arya, Sunil; Mount, David M.; Netanyahu, Nathan S.; Silverman, Ruth; Wu, Angela Y. (1998), "An optimal algorithm for approximate nearest neighbor searching in fixed dimensions", Journal of the ACM, 45 (6): 891–923, doi:10.1145/293347.293348, MR 1678846, S2CID 8193729 |

| KM. | Kanungo, T.; Mount, D. M.; Netanyahu, N. S.; Piatko, C. D.; Silverman, R.; Wu, A. Y. (2002), "An efficient k-means clustering algorithm: analysis and implementation", IEEE Transactions on Pattern Analysis and Machine Intelligence, 24 (7): 881–892, Bibcode:2002ITPAM..24..881K, doi:10.1109/tpami.2002.1017616 |

| LT. | Mount, David M.; Netanyahu, Nathan S.; Piatko, Christine D.; Silverman, Ruth; Wu, Angela Y. (2014), "On the least trimmed squares estimator", Algorithmica, 69 (1): 148–183, doi:10.1007/s00453-012-9721-8, MR 3172284, S2CID 6796756 |
