= Nathan Mileikowsky =

Zionist political activist (1879–1935)

- Натан Милейковский נתן מיליקובסקי
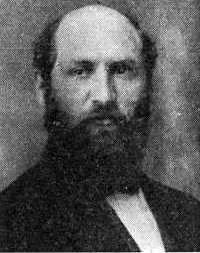
- Born: 15 August 1879; Kreva, Russian Empire
- Died: 4 February 1935 (aged 55); Jerusalem, Mandatory Palestine
- Citizenship: Russian, later British subject
- Spouse: Sarah Lurie
- Children: 9, including Benzion and Elisha
- Relatives: Yonatan Netanyahu (grandson); Benjamin Netanyahu (grandson); Iddo Netanyahu (grandson); Nathan Netanyahu (grandson); Yair Netanyahu (great-grandson)
- Family: Netanyahu

Nathan Mileikowsky (Polish: Natan Milejkowski, IPA: [ˈnatan milɛjˈkɔfskʲi]; Russian: Натан Милейковский, IPA: [nɐˈtan mʲɪlʲɪjˈkofskʲɪj]; Hebrew: נתן מיליקובסקי; 15 August 1879 – 4 February 1935) was a Russian-born Zionist political activist, rabbi, and writer. Mileikowsky was the father of scholar and academic Benzion Netanyahu (né Mileikowsky), and the grandfather of Benjamin Netanyahu, the prime minister of Israel.

== Biography ==
Nathan Mileikowsky was born in 1879 in Kreva, in the Vilna Governorate of the Russian Empire (now in Belarus), which at that time was part of the Pale of Settlement (region of Imperial Russia in which permanent residency by Jews was allowed), the son of Zvi Mileikowsky and Liba Gitel Halevi. Mileikowsky's father made a living from leasing an agricultural estate in a nearby village. At the age of 10, Mileikowsky was sent to the Volozhin Yeshiva, where he spent eight years and was ordained.

Already while Mileikowsky attended yeshiva he began to make speeches and lectures and was in contact with the Zionist activist Yehuda Zvi Yabzrov who encouraged him to engage in this field. At the age of 20, Mileikowsky began promoting Zionism in the Siberia region, following a request to do so by the Zionist leader Yechiel Chlenov. In the following years Mileikowsky continued to engage in Zionist promotion and in addition gave speeches against the "Bund" movement and against other socialist Jewish anti-Zionist movements. During the Sixth Zionist Congress Mileikowsky was among the opponents of the Uganda Programme, despite belonging to the Theodor Herzl camp.

In 1908, Mileikowsky moved to Poland and became the director of the Hebrew Gymnasium of Mordechai Yaakov Krinsky in Warsaw, while continuing to promote Zionism in Poland. He went through hundreds of towns and was considered one of the most popular Zionist speakers. In 1912, Mileikowsky moved to Łódź, and served as a Maggid in the Zionist synagogue "Beth Jacob". He used to deliver his sermons in Hebrew, an uncommon practice at that time. In 1913, the Hebrew newspaper Ha-Tsefirah reported about a major event held in Łódź organized by the members of the Mizrachi movement. The report mentioned also the "excellent speech" made by Rabbi Mileikowsky, which was carried partly in Hebrew and partly in Yiddish. According to his son, Benzion Netanyahu, the Mileikowsky family was one of the few families in the world who spoke Hebrew at that time. In 1914, Mileikowsky was appointed rabbi of the city Rivne, but following World War I he remained with his family in Łódź.

In 1920, Mileikowsky immigrated to Mandatory Palestine with his wife and seven children, and became the director of the school "Vilkomitz" in Rosh Pina. During this period he published various articles in the Hebrew press promoting the Jewish settlement of the Galilee region. On some of the articles, he published and signed under the name "Netanyahu", a surname some of his sons later adopted.

In 1924, he moved with his family to Jerusalem, and during that same year he traveled to England on behalf of Menachem Ussishkin in order to raise funds for the Jewish National Fund and Keren Hayesod. Following the success of these campaigns he was sent to the United States on behalf of the Jewish National Fund. Mileikowsky's numerous speeches made a strong impression on the American Jewish community. In 1926, the newspaper Dos Yiddishe Folk reported that the American Zionist Rabbi Mileikowsky lectured in 700 places through nine months. Once a year, Mileikowsky used to visit Palestine. In 1928, Mileikowsky published several of his speeches in the book Nation and State (Hebrew: עם ומדינה).

On the eve of the 1929 Palestine riots, Mileikowsky returned to Palestine, purchased land in Herzliya in which he built up a farm, and in addition he was active in the Hitahdut HaIkarim settlement movement for private farmers.

After the assassination of Haim Arlosoroff in 1933, Rabbi Mileikowsky, who was affiliated with the Revisionist movement, took part in the establishment of a public committee, headed by Rabbi Abraham Isaac Kook, which protected those accused of Arlosoroff's assassination—namely, Zvi Rosenblatt and Abraham Stavsky. Rabbi Mileikowsky argued that the evidence indicated that they did not commit the assassination and that their execution could lead to a civil war, which would harm the Zionist enterprise.

Rabbi Mileikowsky died from diphtheria in Jerusalem on February 4, 1935, and was buried in the Mount of Olives Cemetery. Rabbi Abraham Isaac Kook referred to Mileikowsky in his eulogy as a "divine speaker".

The square most adjacent to Israel's national cemetery in Mount Herzl is named after Nathan Mileikowsky.

== Family ==
Nathan Mileikowsky and his wife Sarah (née Lurie) had nine children, including: Benzion Netanyahu (the father of Iddo, Yonatan and Benjamin Netanyahu) and Elisha Netanyahu (the husband of Shoshana Netanyahu and the father of Nathan Netanyahu), Saadia Mileikowsky, Amos Milo (Mileikowsky), Miriam (Miri) Margolin, Zacharia (Jaco) Milo, Ezra Mileikowsky, Mattityahu (Maty) Mileikowsky and Hovav Mileikowsky.

Nathan Mileikowsky (Writer and Zionist activist)
Benzion Netanyahu (Professor of History and Zionist activist)	Elisha Netanyahu (Professor of Mathematics)	Shoshana Shenburg (Justice at the Supreme Court of Israel)
Yonatan Netanyahu (Commander of Sayeret Matkal)	Benjamin Netanyahu (Prime Minister of Israel)	Iddo Netanyahu (radiologist, author and playwright)	Nathan Netanyahu (Professor of Computer Science)
