= Netanyahu family =

Family of Benjamin Netanyahu

The Netanyahu family is a prominent Israeli Jewish family, descended from the Russian-born Zionist activist, writer, and rabbi, Nathan Mileikowsky (15 August 1879 – 4 February 1935). Its members include historically notable politicians, military leaders, and academics.

== History of the name ==
Netanyahu
- Pronunciation: English: /ˌnɛtənˈjɑːhuː/ NET-ən-YAH-hoo; Hebrew: [netanˈjahu]
- Language: Hebrew

Origin
- Meaning: 'given by God'
- Region of origin: Israel

Other names
- Nickname: Nathan
- Anglicisation: Nethaniah
- Related names: Elnathan, Jonathan, Natanael

Netanyahu (Hebrew: נְתַנְיָהוּ), also Nethaniah, is a Hebrew-language masculine name and surname. The name means "given by Yahweh" in Hebrew. It is composed of the Hebrew natan (נָתַן, 'to give') and Yah (יָהּ, 'Yah, Yahweh').

In the early 20th century, when Benzion Mileikowsky immigrated from Congress Poland to Mandatory Palestine with his family, it was popular for Ashkenazi Jews to Hebraize their surname. Mileikowsky chose Netanyahu as his surname in honor of his father, Rabbi Nathan Mileikowsky, who used Netanyahu as his pen name.

As a given name, Netanyahu appears three times in the Hebrew Bible, given to minor characters in the First Book of Chronicles, the Second Book of Kings, and the Book of Jeremiah.

Because El and Yahu are used interchangeably to refer to God in Judaism, Netanyahu has the same meaning as Elnatan (Elnathan), Natanael (Nathanael), and Yehonatan (Jonathan).

== Notable family members ==
Notable members of the Netanyahu family include:

- Nathan Mileikowsky (1879–1935), Zionist political activist, father of Benzion Netanyahu
- Avner Netanyahu (born 1994), an Israeli venture capitalist and Benjamin Netanyahu's son
- Benjamin Netanyahu (born 1949), Prime Minister of Israel 1996–1999, 2009–2021, and 2022–present
- Benzion Netanyahu (né Mileikowsky; 1910–2012), Israeli historian and Benjamin Netanyahu's father
- Elisha Netanyahu (1912–1986), Israeli mathematician and Benjamin Netanyahu's uncle
- Iddo Netanyahu (born 1952), Israeli physician, author, and Benjamin Netanyahu's younger brother
- Miki Haran (born 1949), Israeli chemist and Benjamin Netanyahu's first wife
- Nathan Mileikowsky (1879–1935), Zionist activist, rabbi, and Benjamin Netanyahu's grandfather
- Nathan Netanyahu (born 1951), Israeli computer scientist, and Benjamin Netanyahu's cousin
- Sara Netanyahu (née Ben-Artzi; born 1958), Benjamin Netanyahu's third wife
- Sinaia Netanyahu (born 1965), Israeli economist and Benjamin Netanyahu's cousin in law
- Shoshana Netanyahu (née Shenburg; 1923–2022), Israeli Supreme Court justice and Benjamin Netanyahu's aunt (by marriage)
- Yair Netanyahu (born 1991), Israeli podcaster and Benjamin Netanyahu's son
- Yonatan "Yoni" Netanyahu (1946–1976), Israeli special forces commander and Benjamin Netanyahu's older brother

Notable members of the Ben-Arzi family who are in-laws to the Netanyahu Family include:

- Amaziah Ben-Artzi (born 1952), Israeli-American entrepreneur and Benjamin Netanyahu's brother in law
- Galia Ben-Arzi (born 1982), Israeli-American entrepreneur and Benjamin Netanyahu's niece
- Guy Ben-Arzi (born 1980), Israeli entrepreneur and Benjamin Netanyahu's nephew
- Hagai Ben-Artzi (born 1950), Israeli educator and Benjamin Netanyahu's brother in law
- Matanya Ben-Artzi (born 1948), Israeli mathematician and Benjamin Netanyahu's brother in law
- Shmuel Ben-Artzi (1914–2011), Israeli writer and poet and Benjamin Netanyahu's 3rd father in law.
- Ruth Ben-Arzi (born 1971), Israeli-American political scientist and Benjamin Netanyahu's niece

== Family trees ==
Family tree for notable members of the Netanyahu Family

Chaim HaLevi Mileikowsky	Pesia Ber
Zvi Hirsch Mileikowsky	Liba Gitel HaLevi
Nathan Mileikowsky^{★}	Sarah Lurie
Benzion Netanyahu	Tzila Segal	Elisha Netanyahu	Shoshana Shenburg
Yonatan Netanyahu	Miki Haran	Benjamin Netanyahu	Sarah Ben-Artzi	Iddo Netanyahu	Nathan Netanyahu	Sinaia Netanyahu
Yair Netanyahu	Avner Netanyahu

^{★}Used the name Netanyahu as a pen name

Family tree for notable members of the Ben-Arzi Family (Benjamin Netanyahu's inlaws)

Shmuel Ben-Artzi	Chava Paritzky
Matanya Ben-Artzi	Hagai Ben-Artzi	Amaziah Ben-Artzi	Sarah Ben-Artzi	Benjamin Netanyahu
Ruth Ben-Arzi	Galia Ben-Arzi	Guy Ben-Arzi	Yair Netanyahu	Avner Netanyahu

== See also ==
- Mileikowsky, the original surname of the Netanyahu family
- Nathaniel, a given name of Hebrew origin used as the basis for the Netanyahu surname
- The Netanyahus, a 2021 fictional novel about the family
- Netanya, an Israeli city whose etymology is similar to the etymology of the Netanyahu surname
