= 2006 Baalbek hospital raid =

Israeli military operation in the 2006 Lebanon War

Operation Sharp and Smooth
- Part of 2006 Lebanon War
Date	August 1, 2006 – August 2, 2006
Location	Baalbek, Lebanon
Result	Israeli victory

Belligerents
Israel	Hezbollah; LCP

Commanders and leaders
(Israel) Eliezer Shkedi (Israel) Emmanuel Moreno	Unknown

Strength
Unit 269 "Sayeret Matkal"; Unit 5101 "Shaldag"; 200 commandos	Unknown

Casualties and losses
None	19 Hezbollah fighters and 2 armed Communist party members killed 10 killed (IDF claim)
- According to HRW 11 civilians killed. 5 civilians detained but released after three weeks

During the 2006 Lebanon War, Operation Sharp and Smooth (Hebrew: מבצע חד וחלק), also known as the Baalbek operation, was an Israel Defense Forces (IDF) raid on a hospital in the city of Baalbek, which was being used as a Hezbollah headquarters, and a neighbourhood of the city. The precise objectives of the raid remain classified, but it is known that a number of Lebanese, including Hezbollah and armed Lebanese Communist Party members, were killed, and five Lebanese civilians were arrested and detained in Israel as suspected Hezbollah members, but released after three weeks. The casualty figures for the raid vary. According to inquiries by Human Rights Watch (HRW) and Lebanese authorities 16 Lebanese residents, most of them civilians, were killed. According to IDF ten Hezbollah militants were killed in the attack.

== Background ==
Operation Sharp and Smooth was one of a number of raids carried out by the IDF during the 2006 Lebanon War ("Operation Change of Direction") against Hezbollah operated medical facilities that the IDF said served primarily as operations bases where "guerrillas planned attacks together with Iranian instructors". By August 2, when the Baalbek operation was over, 15 to 20 similar raids had been carried out according to the IDF. Air strikes on Baalbek, a Hezbollah stronghold, by the Israeli Air Force on July 17 had destroyed petrol stations, Hezbollah offices, a dairy processing plant and resulted in residents fleeing the town. Those that remained reportedly expected another attack.

== The operation ==
The operation began between 9:30 and 10:15 p.m. on August 1 with intensive bombardment around the Dar al-Hikma hospital to cut off all the access roads. The hospital was one of several medical facilities that the IDF believed may have been used to treat or hold the two captured soldiers, Ehud Goldwasser and Eldad Regev, after their abduction by Hezbollah the previous month. Approximately 200 elite commandos fast-roped from helicopters which previously refuelled over the Mediterranean Sea. The operation involved two commando units: Shaldag of the Israeli Air Force, and Sayeret Matkal of the IDF Branch of Intelligence (Aman). Air cover was provided by attack helicopters, jet fighters and unmanned drones. At least 10 bombing runs were carried out around the hospital and on hills east and north of Baalbek according to witness reports.

Upon landing, the two units split up. The Sayeret Matkal unit proceeded to the Dar al-Hikma hospital in the Jamaliyah suburb of Baalbek, known for its connections to Hezbollah and believed by Israeli Military Intelligence to be a base for Iranian Revolutionary Guards. According to local residents, the Hezbollah-run hospital was financed by an Iranian charity, the Imam Khomeini Charitable Society. The hospital was empty at the time, the patients having been transferred to other hospitals, or sent home four days earlier.

The Israeli force occupied the hospital. According to HRW, IDF commandos shot and killed a nurse who was trying to flee and wounded two armed security guards during the take-over. Two armed Hezbollah fighters were killed outside the hospital while engaging the Israelis, one by a missile from an Israeli drone and the other by small arms fire from the commandos. Based on Hezbollah "martyr" posters that later appeared around the village of Al Jamaliyeh, HRW concluded that the nurse and the two militants may have been the only Hezbollah-affiliated people killed in the raid.

A group of local residents were alarmed by the sound of fighting and assembled at the house of the local mukhtar. Two of the men were armed members of the Lebanese Communist Party (LCP) and a third was an unarmed member of the group. An Israeli helicopter fired a number of missiles at the group, killing all three LCP militants as well as three unarmed men. According to an assessment by Human Rights Watch the two armed militants were to be considered combatants and therefore legitimate targets. HRW further noted that the two combatants endangered the lives of the civilians by mixing with them. The unarmed men killed in the attack were faulted for mixing with combatants during an Israeli military operation. HRW thus considered them to be collateral casualties to a legitimate Israeli military strike."

At approximately 3.30 a.m. on 2 August, an Israeli Apache helicopter fired a missile at a Syrian Kurdish seasonal agricultural worker and his family, one of five families of farmers who been sheltering in their tents since the raid began, when the family left their tent and ran for shelter at a Lebanese house nearby. The father Talal Chibli (40), his wife Maha Sha`ban (32) and their children Muhannad (13), Muayyad (12), Asma’ (6), and Muhammad (4) were killed or died later of their wounds. Three of the family's children, Muthana (9), Mus`ab (5), and Batul (8 months), were seriously wounded but survived. According to HRW the family "had no links to Hezbollah and were not participating in the hostilities".

The second Israeli unit swept through the al-Usaira neighborhood of Baalbek, some five kilometers from the hospital. Apparently they were looking for persons related to Hassan Nasrallah, the General-Secretary of Hezbollah. The Israeli soldiers entered a house in the neighborhood and asked a shopkeeper if he was Hassan Nasrallah, which was his name, although he was unrelated to the Hezbollah leader. Nasrallah, his 14-year-old son and five other civilians were kidnapped. The prisoners were allegedly beaten and threatened by IDF soldiers. The soldiers allegedly threatened to kill 14-year-old Muhammad Nasrallah together with his father unless he told them who was in Hezbollah. The boy was released but the five adults were brought to Israel. The prisoners, two of whom were seniors, were detained for four days and nights inside a bus. An Israeli reserve soldier serving in the Military Police complained about the procedure, calling it "hard to describe it as humanitarian treatment." The reluctance of the IDF to open a formal Prisoner of War facility contravened army regulations. Around 20 Lebanese prisoners were detained there, most of whom were released after questioning.

The commandos were on the ground for about four and half hours from 10:30 p.m. until 3 a.m.

Immediately after the raid, the IDF said ten "terrorists" had been killed, all of them armed and wearing bulletproof vests, and five Hezbollah members had been captured during a "precise surgical raid" that resulted in "no IDF or civilian casualties". The operation was publicly applauded by military Chief of Staff Lt. Gen. Dan Halutz. Hezbollah said that the five people captured by Israel were civilians and not members of Hezbollah. The captives initially described by the IDF as "known Hizbullah gunmen" were later identified as civilians and released after 3 weeks. According to Human Rights Watch and Lebanese authorities most of the fatalities were civilians.

The five prisoners who had been captured in the raid and taken to Israel were subjected to repeated interrogations about their relationship to Hezbollah and its leader. On August 16, they were finally allowed to see a lawyer who brought a petition to the Israeli Supreme Court to obtain their release. Instead of answering the petition the IDF released the five to UNIFIL, three weeks after being abducted. "We captured five people we thought were involved with Hezbollah," explained an Israeli official to New York Times. "Under questioning it turned out we were wrong. So we turned them over to the U.N." Haaretz wrote that "the release of the captives again raises questions about the real value of the operations of the special units". The IDF and the government had been quick to announce significant achievements immediately after the operations.

According to the investigation by Human Rights Watch 16 Lebanese residents were killed in the raid, of whom four were deemed combatants and a further two civilian members of Hezbollah or the Communist party. An official report by the Lebanese Internal Security Forces (ISF) confirm these numbers, although the names do not fully match those supplied by HRW. Two of the victims were identified as belonging to Hezbollah but the Communist party members were not mentioned in the report. The report also contained the names of the 14 Lebanese wounded in the fighting.

The precise objective of the operation is unknown. The Jerusalem Post suggested at the time of the raid that the IDF may have believed that the two kidnapped soldiers, Ehud Goldwasser and Eldad Regev, were being held in bunkers below the hospital but that the raid "appeared to have been about collecting intelligence". Lebanese sources claimed that the target of the raid was Mohammad Yazbek, a well-known Hezbollah leader living in the area who had been accused by Israel of involvement in the capture of IDF Colonel (res.) Elhanan Tannenbaum in 2000. Yazbek however escaped unhurt. A spokesman for the IDF denied that the operation had a "specific target". Chief of Staff Lt. Gen. Dan Halutz claimed that "the main goal" was to deliver a message to Hizbullah that the IDF "can operate deep inside Lebanon and wherever else we want to." According to Ami Pedahzur, Professor of Government and Middle Eastern Studies at the University of Texas at Austin, the raid was an unsuccessful attempt to kidnap Hezbollah activists for "bargaining" purposes.

According to an account published in Maariv a month after the war the IDF had learnt beforehand that the intended target of the operation would not be in place. The IDF however decided to go ahead with it for "propaganda purposes". The aim had been to obtain information about the fate of the abducted soldiers but in fact none was obtained. In spite of this it was marketed as a success story. The report was denied by the IDF.

== Assessments ==
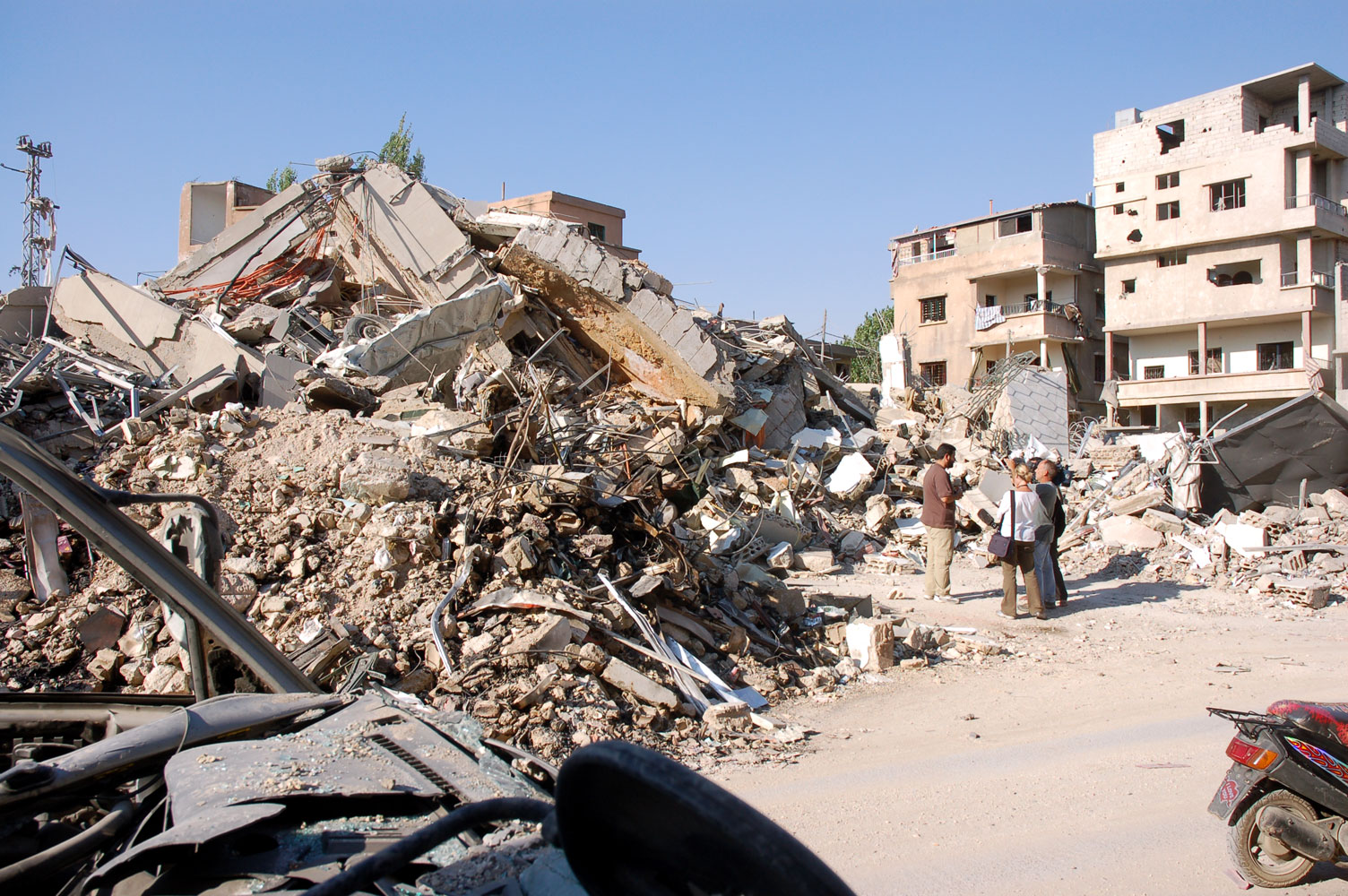
Israeli bombing in Baalbek

Stratfor concluded in an analysis of the raid that Israel took large risks and allotted huge military resources in carrying out the raid "well in excess of its achievements." Former chief of staff Moshe Ya'alon, a sharp critic of IDF conduct during the Lebanon war, questioned whether the raid was "justified in terms of risk, cost and benefit" and whether it was not simply "an adventure." HRW concluded that "the operation appears to have been based on questionable intelligence and had a disproportionate impact on civilians". Hezbollah leader Nasrallah mocked the raid during a speech on al-Manar TV in which he said "They stormed a hospital and threw a grenade...to search for injured fighters who they didn’t capture...they kidnapped five civilians and they are hostages. This is intelligence, this is the Mossad?" According to Ofer Shelach and Yoav Limor, the operation had a psychological influence on Hezbollah leadership as the attack was in the heart of their stronghold, the local commander of Bekaa area was dismissed, movement on the roads was minimized, and more energy was put on self-defense.

== Fatalities ==
Group of men killed by hellfire missiles fired from helicopter or drone:

- Maxim "'Ali" Jamal al-Din, 18 (combatant in Communist Party)
- 'Awad Jamal al-Din, 58 (combatant in Communist Party)
- Hassan Jamal al-Din, 18
- Naji Jamal al-Din, 45
- Muhammad Naji Jamal al-Din, 12
- Malik Jamal al-Din, 22
- Hussain Yusif al-Mekdad, 42

Men killed in or around Dar al-Hikma hospital:

- Atif Amhaz (nurse, civilian Hezbollah member)
- Rida Midlej (Hezbollah combatant)
- Wissam Ahmad Yaghi (Hezbollah combatant)

Syrian Kurdish family killed by Hellfire missile strike:

- Talal Chibli, 40
- Maha al-'Issa Sha'ban, 35
- Muhanad Talal Chibli, 14
- Muayyad Talal Chibli, 12
- Asma Talal Chibli, 6
- Muhammad Talal Chibli, 4

== Civilians detained and brought to Israel ==
These individuals included:

- Hasan Deeb Nasrallah, 60
- Bilal Nasrallah, 32
- Ahmad Salih al-‘Awtah (or al-Ghawtah), 55
- Hasan al-Burji, 40
- Muhammad Shukr, unknown age

== Sources ==
- Human Rights Watch (September 2007). Why They Died: Civilian Casualties in Lebanon during the 2006 War (PDF) (Report). Human Rights Watch.
- Amnesty International (AI), Israel/Lebanon Deliberate destruction or "collateral damage"?, Israeli attacks on civilian infrastructure, August 2006
