= Doron Kempel =

American Born Innovator

- דורון קמפל
- Born: 29 July 1963 (age 63); Israel
- Occupations: Entrepreneur, CEO

Doron Kempel (Hebrew: דורון קמפל; born 29 July 1963) is an Israeli-born American international technology innovator, serial entrepreneur and former deputy chief of Sayeret Matkal. He is founder and CEO of SimpliVity Corporation (sold to HPE in 2017 for an estimated $650M, plus approximately $50M in additions), founder and CEO of Diligent Technologies (sold to IBM in 2008 for an estimated $200M) and former vice president and General Manager at Dell EMC (EMC Corporation until 2001). He is also founder and CEO of Bond (Our Bond), an AI powered, personal security company that offers 24/7 preventative personal security service to businesses, cities and individuals.

== Education ==
Kempel graduated from Harvard Business School with a Master of Business Administration (MBA). He also holds a law degree (LLM) and a philosophy degree (BA) from Tel Aviv University. Kempel was also a member of Israel's national youth team-handball team.

== Military career ==
Kempel served in the Israel Defense Forces (IDF) from 1981 through 1994. He was a member of Sayeret Matkal, a special forces unit of the IDF in which former Israeli Prime Ministers Ehud Barak and Benjamin Netanyahu served as officers, and rose to become its deputy chief.

He led dozens of covert special missions and was decorated the Chief Of Staff Decoration by then Chief of IDF Lt. General Ehud Barak, for remarkable courage, command and resourcefulness under fire. In 1992, while on leave, completing his law degree in Tel Aviv University, he was called to lead the planning and preparation of Operation Bramble Bush - the targeted elimination of Saddam Hussein, then President of Iraq. Kempel was designated to lead the mission in Iraq, but it was cancelled due to a tragic live fire accident during the final rehearsal for the mission causing the death of five Israeli soldiers and for which Kempel and his deputy stood trial.

Kempel was offered to continue his service in the IDF. However, he chose to discontinue his service, applied and was accepted to Harvard Business School, thereby launching his business career.

== Business career ==
Before joining Dell EMC, Kempel was Vice President of Sales and Marketing for Imedia Corporation and also became a US citizen. Imedia Corporation was acquired by Terayon Communications Systems.

Kempel initiated and became vice president and General Manager for the Media Solutions Group at EMC Corporation in 1998 and led that organization until 2001.

In 2003, Kempel co-founded data-storage company Diligent Technologies with fellow entrepreneur Moshe Yanai. Kempel led Diligent as Chairman & CEO. Yanai was an investor. In April 2008, IBM acquired Diligent Technologies for an estimated $200M. Kempel stayed with IBM for a period of 15 months in order to facilitate the integration of Diligent into IBM.

In August 2009, Kempel founded SimpliVity Corporation, which pioneered the introduction of HyperConverged, Cloud IT Infrastructure, combining server, storage and networking into one device in an all-in-one system. In February 2017, HPE acquired SimpliVity for an estimated $650 million (including an additional approximately $50M program, for retention and incentives of SimpliVity employees).

In 2017, Kempel founded Bond (OurBond), a New York City–based personal security company that provides AI-enabled preventative personal security services in 28 countries. Doron is Chairman & CEO of Bond, which is a public company; its clients include corporations, municipalities, and universities that offer the service to executives and their families, employees, residents, and students. The company uses the slogan “personal security for all."
