= Elisha Netanyahu =

Israeli mathematician (1912–1986)

- אֱלִישָׁע נְתַנְיָהוּ
- Born: Elisha Mileikowsky; December 21, 1912; Warsaw, Congress Poland, Russian Empire (present-day Poland)
- Died: April 3, 1986 (aged 73); Jerusalem, Israel/Palestine (see status of Jerusalem)
- Citizenship: Israel
- Education: Hebrew University of Jerusalem
- Known for: Complex analysis; establishing the Department of Mathematics at the Technion
- Spouse: Shoshana Shenburg (m. 1949)
- Children: 2, including Nathan
- Father: Nathan Mileikowsky
- Relatives: Benzion Netanyahu (brother); Benjamin Netanyahu (nephew); Iddo Netanyahu (nephew); Yonatan Netanyahu (nephew); Yair Netanyahu (great-nephew)
- Family: Netanyahu
- Scientific career
- Fields: Mathematics
- Workplaces: Technion – Israel Institute of Technology
- Doctoral advisor: Michael Fekete; Binyamin Amirà

Elisha Netanyahu (Hebrew: אֱלִישָׁע נְתַנְיָהוּ; né Mileikowsky; December 21, 1912 – April 3, 1986) was a Polish-born Israeli mathematician specializing in complex analysis. Over the course of his work at the Technion, he was the Dean of the Faculty of Sciences and established the separate Department of Mathematics. He was the brother of historian Benzion Netanyahu and the uncle of current Israeli Prime Minister Benjamin Netanyahu.

== Biography ==
Elisha Mileikowsky, later Netanyahu, was born in Warsaw, Poland, to Sarah (née Lurie) and the Russian Jewish writer and Zionist activist Nathan Mileikowsky. He was the third of nine children. In 1920, the family immigrated to Palestine. The family eventually settled in Jerusalem and adopted the Hebrew name Netanyahu.

Elisha Netanyahu went to the Reali School in Haifa, from which he graduated in 1930. He later returned to Reali in 1935 to teach mathematics there. He studied at the Hebrew University of Jerusalem, from which he received his BS, MA and PhD (1942). His advisors were Michael Fekete and Binyamin Amirà. After the graduation he joined the British Army as a volunteer, serving in Egypt and then in Italy as an officer in a unit of the Royal Engineering Corps. He specialized in preparation of maps, which he continued to do during the 1948 Arab–Israeli War.

After he was demobilized in 1946, he became a lecturer at the Technion. He rose to a professor in 1958, and later became the head of the Mathematics Section, then as Dean of the Faculty of Sciences. His administrative efforts also played an important role towards establishment of the Ben-Gurion University of the Negev.

He had long term visits at Stanford University (1953–54), NYU (1961), the University of New Mexico (1969), the University of Maryland, College Park (1973), and ETH Zürich (1979). In 1980, Netanyahu retired from the Technion and moved to Jerusalem, where he died of cancer in 1986.

Throughout his long career, Netanyahu collaborated with Paul Erdős, Charles Loewner and other leading mathematicians, continuing and expanding the analytical traditions at the Technion.

=== Personal life ===
He was the brother of Benzion Netanyahu, a professor of history, and the uncle of the Prime Minister of Israel, Benjamin Netanyahu. In 1949 Netanyahu married Shoshana Shenburg, his former student at the Reali, who later became the second female justice at the Israel Supreme Court. They had two children: Nathan (b. 1951), a professor of computer science at Bar-Ilan University, and Dan (b. 1954), an information systems auditor.

== Elisha Netanyahu Memorial Lectures ==
The Elisha Netanyahu Memorial Lecture Series was established by his family – his brother Amos Milo (Mileikowsky), his wife and his children – and the Technion to honor the memory in 1987 with the first lecture by Paul Erdős. In other years, the speakers included Lars Ahlfors, Robert Aumann, Lipman Bers, Enrico Bombieri, Charles Fefferman, Samuel Karlin, David Kazhdan, Louis Nirenberg, Terence Tao, Wendelin Werner, and Don Zagier.
