= Iddo Netanyahu =

Israeli physician, author and playwright (born 1952)

- עדו נתניהו
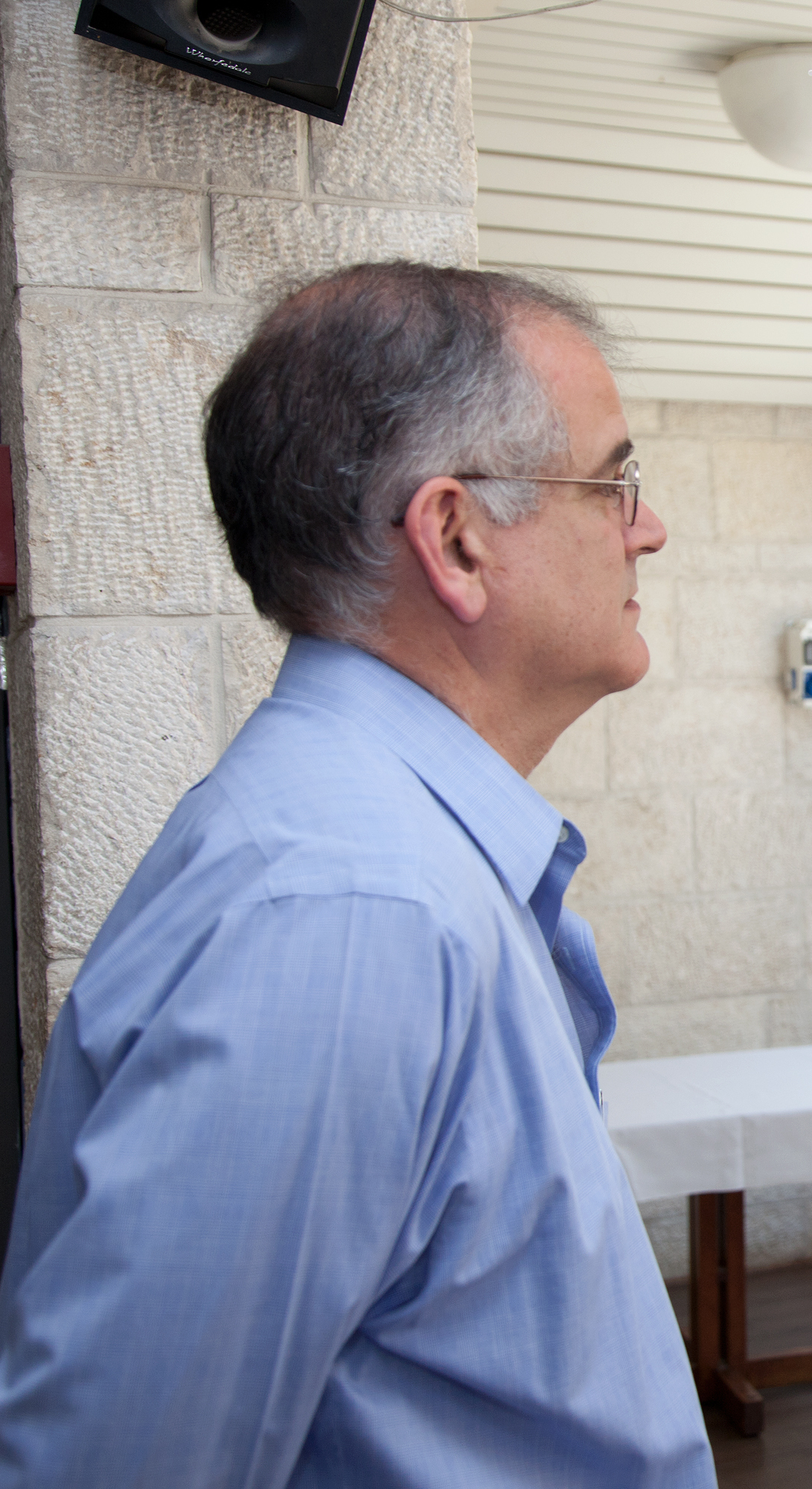
- Netanyahu in 2011
- Born: July 24, 1952 (age 74); Jerusalem, Israel
- Education: Cornell University; Hebrew University of Jerusalem (MD)
- Occupations: Physician; author; playwright
- Spouse: Dafna Netanyahu
- Children: 2
- Parents: Benzion Netanyahu (father); Tzila Segal (mother)
- Relatives: Nathan Mileikowsky (grandfather); Yonatan Netanyahu (brother); Benjamin Netanyahu (brother); Yair Netanyahu (nephew); Elisha Netanyahu (uncle); Nathan Netanyahu (cousin)
- Family: Netanyahu

Iddo Netanyahu (Hebrew: עדו נתניהו; born July 24, 1952) is an Israeli physician, author, and playwright. He is the younger brother of Benjamin Netanyahu, the Prime Minister of Israel, and Yonatan Netanyahu who was killed leading the Entebbe raid, a hostage rescue mission in 1976.

== Biography ==
Iddo Netanyahu was born in Jerusalem, the son of Tzila (née Segal; 1912–2000) and professor Benzion Netanyahu (1910–2012), and spent part of his childhood in the United States living in Cheltenham Township, Pennsylvania, where he attended elementary and middle school. His family later returned to Israel, and he attended high school in Jerusalem. After finishing high school, Netanyahu returned to the United States to study at his father's former workplace Cornell University, but in 1973 he put a hold on his studies to fight for Israel in the Yom Kippur War.

Netanyahu served in Sayeret Matkal from 1970 to 1973, Israel's top special forces unit, as did both his brothers. He later returned to Cornell University and finished his undergraduate degree. He went back to Israel and earned an M.D. from Hebrew University of Jerusalem School of Medicine and did post-doctoral training at Georgetown University Hospital, Washington, D.C., and Mount Sinai Medical Center, New York City. He works part-time as a radiologist, but dedicates most of his time to writing.

Since 2008, after writing several books, Netanyahu has been concentrating on playwriting. His plays have appeared worldwide, including off-Broadway in New York, Tel Aviv, St. Petersburg, Moscow, and Tashkent, among other cities. His play Don Samuel Abravanel was awarded the President of Warsaw Prize in 2022.

== Personal life ==
Netanyahu and his wife Dafna have two children.

== Published works ==
- The Rescuers – published in Hebrew, a collection of short stories.
- Yoni's Last Battle: The Rescue at Entebbe, 1976 (2002) – Later re-released as Entebbe: A Defining Moment in the War on Terrorism – The Jonathan Netanyahu Story, published in Hebrew, English, Russian, Chinese, and Italian.
- Itamar K. – published in Hebrew, Russian and Italian, a novel about music and life, ironic and poetic.
- Sayeret Matkal at Entebbe – published in Hebrew, documents and interviews about the raid.
- A Happy End – published in Italian, drama, with the title "Un Lieto Fine," and in English by Playscripts, Inc.

== Plays ==
- A Happy End - a Jewish family living in Berlin, contemplating the meaning and consequences of the recent rise of the Nazis.
- Worlds In Collision - a battle of the minds between Albert Einstein and Immanuel Velikovsky.
- Meaning - the relationship between the renowned psychiatrist Viktor Frankl and a patient of his, against the backdrop of the Holocaust.
- The Muse - a comedy about today's intellectual and artistic trends.
- Myth - the attempts of a widow to fight the falsifications about her late husband.
- Don Samuel Abravanel - the legalistic murder of a Jewish leader in Medieval Spain and its consequences.
