= Operation Bramble Bush =

1992 Israeli plan to assassinate Iraqi president Saddam Hussein

- Part of the Arab–Israeli conflict
- Operational scope: Assassination attempt
- Planned: November 7, 1992
- Planned by: Israel Defense Forces
- Objective: Assassinate Saddam Hussein at his uncle's funeral
- Outcome: Plan cancelled following a training disaster in which 5 Israeli soldiers were killed and 6 others were wounded

Operation Bramble Bush (Hebrew: מבצע שיח אטד) was an Israeli plan to assassinate Iraqi President Saddam Hussein, in 1992. It was described in full in December 2003 by the Israeli newspaper Yedioth Ahronoth, but news reports had circulated about the plot since January 1999. The plan was conceived as retaliation for Iraqi Scud missile attacks during the Gulf War. Another motivation was the postwar revelation by UN inspectors that Iraq had been a few years away from potential nuclear, chemical, and biological weapons capability as well as the missile capability to hit Israel, and the fear that Hussein would continue trying to develop such capabilities. The plan was called off after five commandos were accidentally killed during the final rehearsal for the operation; the accident is known in Israel as the Tze'elim Bet disaster (אסון צאלים ב').

== Plan ==
IDF Chief of Staff Ehud Barak persuaded Prime Minister Yitzhak Shamir and then his successor Yitzhak Rabin to approve an operation to assassinate Saddam Hussein. In January 1992, he formed a team headed by Amiram Levin to examine ways Saddam could be assassinated. Various schemes were considered, among them crashing an Israeli plane or satellite in Iraq and then blowing it up when Hussein came to inspect it, creating a European straw company to sell him a new modern television studio from which he could broadcast his speeches and blowing it up as he broadcast, and detonating a booby-trapped monument as he stood before it at a memorial ceremony.

When Saddam's uncle, Khairallah Talfah, was discovered to be terminally ill, the Israelis decided to ambush the funeral party at the family's plot at the cemetery in Tikrit, as it was the only place outside of well-guarded Baghdad where it would surely be Saddam himself and not a body double. The Israelis closely followed Talfah's treatment in Jordan. When it was decided that he was taking too long to die, a plan was conceived for the Mossad to assassinate Barzan al-Tikriti, Saddam's half-brother who was then the Iraqi ambassador to the United Nations, and ambush Saddam at his funeral instead.

Under the plan, a commando team from the Israeli Army's elite Sayeret Matkal unit was to be inserted into Iraq by helicopter some distance away, travel to the cemetery in jeeps disguised to look like Iraqi Army vehicles and fitted with missile launchers, and kill Saddam with TV-guided "Midras" missiles.

Sayeret Matkal commandos drilled for the operation with a replica of the Hussein family's cemetery at the infantry training base near kibbutz Tze'elim in the Negev. When the commandos were declared ready, a rehearsal for the operation led by Doron Kempel was held for senior IDF commanders on November 5, 1992. Ehud Barak was among those in attendance. The operation's execution was planned for just two days away.

== Training accident ==
The members of the hit team drilled with live missiles, while members of the unit's intelligence and administrative staff played the part of Saddam and his entourage. The commandos fired live rounds at a convoy simulating the target after mistaking a "dry run", where a soldier posed as Saddam waving at crowds, for a "wet run", where Saddam's part was replaced by a mannequin due to weariness from the training as well as poor planning to the point where the same code word was used for both a "dry" and "wet" run. As a result, the commandos fired two missiles at their fellow soldiers simulating Saddam and his convoy, one of which hit the middle of the convoy while the other landed a few yards away. Five soldiers were killed and six wounded.

The plan was cancelled. Israeli press reports described the incident as a "training accident." Israeli censors tried to prevent Israeli newspapers from publishing the fact that the head of military intelligence, Uri Sagi, had witnessed the accident, but the censors relented a few weeks later. On November 24, the American newspaper The Miami Herald reported that the soldiers involved in the accident had been rehearsing a plan to kill Hezbollah leader Hassan Nasrallah. The New York Times, The Times, and the Independent also reported on the apparent attempt against Nasrallah, and the Israeli military censor complained the reporters from all newspapers involved had violated censorship laws.

== Aftermath ==
Seven years later, Operation Bramble Bush II once again targeted Saddam. Mossad agents had scouted locations in Iraq for the ambush of the Iraqi leader. However, as before, the plan was scrapped, this time because of both the British-American Operation Desert Fox and concerns that the operation could harm the Arab–Israeli peace process.
