= Shoshana Netanyahu =

Israeli judge (1923–2022)

- שׁוֹשַׁנָּה נְתַנְיָהוּ
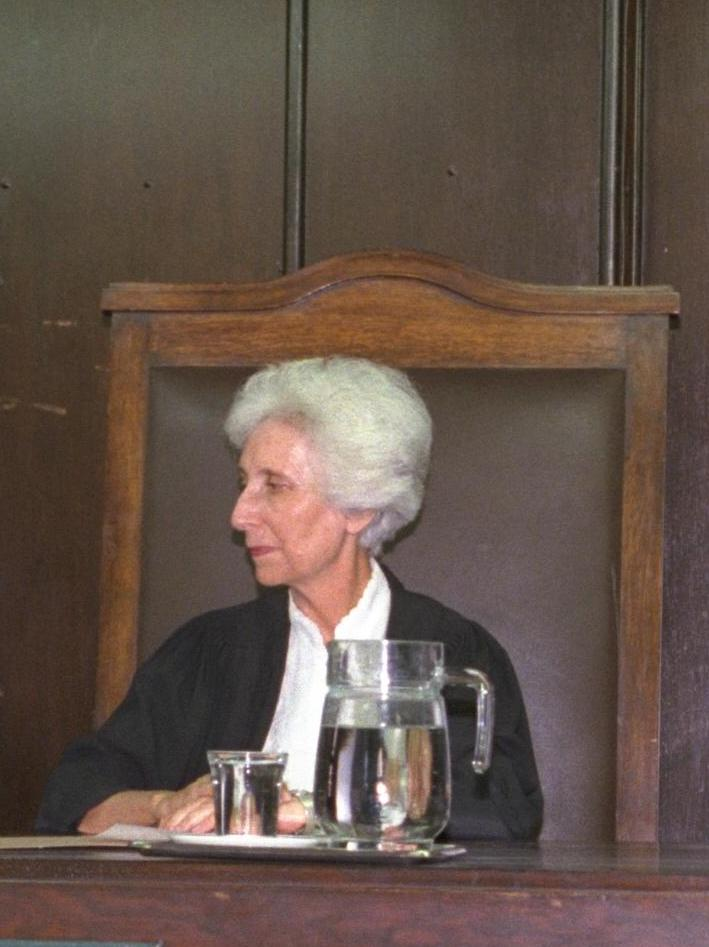
- Netanyahu in 1992

Justice at the Supreme Court of Israel
- In office 1981–1993

Personal details
- Born: Shoshana Shenburg; 6 April 1923 Free City of Danzig
- Died: 7 October 2022 (aged 99) Jerusalem, Israel/Palestine (see status of Jerusalem)
- Citizenship: Israel
- Spouse: Elisha Netanyahu (m. 1949; died 1986)
- Children: 2, including Nathan
- Occupation: Judge; lawyer

Shoshana Netanyahu (Hebrew: שׁוֹשַׁנָּה נְתַנְיָהוּ; née Shenburg; 6 April 1923 – 7 October 2022) was a Danziger-born Israeli judge and lawyer who was a justice at the Supreme Court of Israel. She was married to mathematician Elisha Netanyahu (1912–1986), who was the uncle of Benjamin Netanyahu, current Prime Minister of Israel.

== Biography ==
Netanyahu was born Shoshana Shenburg in 1923, in the Free City of Danzig (now Gdańsk, Poland). She immigrated to Mandatory Palestine with her family in 1924, and settled in the Bat Galim neighborhood of Haifa. She graduated from the Reali High School in Haifa 1941, and took British Mandate–operated legal classes.

Netanyahu worked as an escort for S. Horowitz, and then spent a year serving as assistant prosecutor in the Israel Air Force. She returned to her previous position, and two years later moved to the advocate firm, Friedman and Komisar.

In 1949, she married professor Elisha Netanyahu, the brother of Benzion Netanyahu and the uncle of Benjamin Netanyahu. The couple had two children: Nathan (b. 1951), a professor of computer science at Bar-Ilan University, and Dan (b. 1954), an information systems auditor.

In 1960, she returned to Friedman and Komisar. In 1969, she was appointed a judge on the Magistrates Court in Haifa and from 1974 to 1981 she served as a Haifa District Court judge. In 1981, she became the second female Israel Supreme Court justice, after Miriam Ben-Porat's retirement. She retired from the Supreme Court in 1993. During her tenure, she also headed a national committee on health care in Israel from 1988 to 1990, which led to major legislative changes.

Following her retirement from the bench, Netanyahu was an adjunct lecturer at the University of Haifa (1993–1998) and at the Hebrew University of Jerusalem (1993–2002). In 1993, she received the Women's League for Conservative Judaism award. She received an honorary doctorate from the University of Haifa in 1997. In 2002, she was made an honorary citizen of Jerusalem.
