= Benzion Netanyahu =

Israeli encyclopedist and historian (1910–2012)

- בֶּנְצִיּוֹן נְתַנְיָהוּ
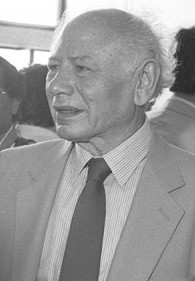
- Netanyahu in 1986
- Born: Benzion Mileikowsky; March 25, 1910; Warsaw, Congress Poland, Russian Empire
- Died: April 30, 2012 (aged 102); West Jerusalem, Israel
- Citizenship: Israel
- Education: Hebrew University of Jerusalem (MA); Dropsie College (PhD)
- Occupations: Encyclopedist; historian; medievalist
- Spouse: Tzila Segal (m. 1944; died 2000)
- Children: Yonatan; Benjamin; Iddo
- Father: Nathan Mileikowsky
- Relatives: Elisha Netanyahu (brother); Nathan Netanyahu (nephew); Yair Netanyahu (grandson)
- Family: Netanyahu

Benzion Netanyahu (Note: Hebrew: בֶּנְצִיּוֹן נְתַנְיָהוּ, IPA: [bentsiˈjon netanˈjahu]; Polish: Bencijjon Netanjahu, IPA: [bɛnˈt͡ɕijjɔn nɛtanˈjaxu].) (né Mileikowsky; (Note: Hebrew: מיליקובסקי; Polish: Bensyjon/Bencyjon Milejkowski, IPA: [bɛnˈsɨjɔn/bɛnˈt͡sɨjɔn milɛjˈkɔfskʲi]; Russian: Бенцион Милейковский, IPA: [bʲɪntsɨˈon mʲɪlʲɪjˈkofskʲɪj].) March 25, 1910 – April 30, 2012) was a Polish-born Israeli encyclopedist, historian, and medievalist. Born in Warsaw, he served as a professor of history at Cornell University. A scholar of Judaic history, he was also an activist in the Revisionist Zionism movement, who lobbied in the United States to support the creation of the Jewish state. His field of expertise was the history of the Jews in Spain. He was an editor of the Hebrew Encyclopedia and assistant to Benjamin Azkin, Ze'ev Jabotinsky's personal secretary.

Netanyahu was the father of current Israeli Prime Minister Benjamin Netanyahu; Yonatan Netanyahu, ex-commander of Sayeret Matkal; and Iddo Netanyahu, a physician, author, and playwright.

== Biography ==
Benzion Mileikowsky (later Netanyahu) was born in Warsaw in partitioned Poland, which was under Russian control, to Sarah (Lurie) and writer and Zionist activist Nathan Mileikowsky. Nathan was a rabbi who toured Europe and the United States, making speeches supporting Zionism. In 1920 the Mileikowsky family immigrated to Mandatory Palestine. After living in Jaffa, Tel Aviv, and Safed, the family settled in Jerusalem. Once in Palestine, Nathan Mileikowsky began signing some of the articles he wrote "Netanyahu", and his son later adopted this as his own surname. It was a common practice for Zionist immigrants at the time to adopt a Hebrew surname. Nathan Mileikowsky had also used the pen name "Nitay". Benzion Netanyahu studied at the teachers' seminary and the Hebrew University of Jerusalem. Although his father was a rabbi, Benzion was secular. His younger brother, mathematician Elisha Netanyahu, became dean of sciences at the Technion.

In 1944, Netanyahu married Tzila Segal (1912–2000), whom he met during his studies in Palestine. The couple had three sons: Yonatan (1946–76), former commander of Sayeret Matkal, who was killed in action leading Operation Entebbe; Benjamin (b. 1949), Israeli Prime Minister (1996–99, 2009–2021, 2022–); and Iddo (b. 1952), a physician, author, and playwright. The family lived on Haportzim Street in the Jerusalem neighborhood of Katamon. Tzila Netanyahu died in 2000.

== Zionist activism ==
Benzion Netanyahu studied medieval history at Hebrew University in Jerusalem. During his studies, he became active in Revisionist Zionism, a movement of people who had split from their mainstream Zionist counterparts, believing those in the mainstream were too conciliatory to the British authorities governing Palestine, and espousing a more militant, right-wing Jewish nationalism than the one advocated by the Labour Zionists who led Israel in its early years. The revisionists were led by Jabotinsky, whose belief in the necessity of an "iron wall" between Israel and its Arab neighbors had influenced Israeli politics since the 1930s. Netanyahu became a close friend of Abba Ahimeir.

Netanyahu was co-editor of Betar, a Hebrew monthly (1933–34), then editor of the Revisionist Zionist daily newspaper Ha-Yarden in Jerusalem (1934–35) until the British Mandate authorities ordered the paper to cease publication. He was editor at the Zionist Political Library, Jerusalem and Tel Aviv, 1935–1940.

In 1940, Netanyahu went to New York to serve for a few months as assistant to the secretary of Jabotinsky, who was seeking to build American support for his militant New Zionists. Jabotinsky died the same year, and Netanyahu became executive director of the New Zionist Organization of America, the political rival of the more moderate Zionist Organization of America. He held the post until 1948.

As executive director, Netanyahu was one of the Revisionist movement's leaders in the United States during World War II. At the same time, he pursued his PhD at Dropsie College for Hebrew and Cognate Learning in Philadelphia (now the Center for Advanced Judaic Studies at the University of Pennsylvania), writing his dissertation on Isaac Abarbanel (1437–1508), a Jewish scholar and statesman who opposed the banishment of Jews from Spain.

Netanyahu believed in Greater Israel. When the United Nations Partition Plan for Palestine was published (November 29, 1947), he joined others who signed a petition against the plan. The petition was published in The New York Times. During that time, he was active in engaging with Congress members in Washington, D.C.

In 1949, he returned to Israel, where he tried to start a political career but failed. Relentlessly hawkish, he believed that the "vast majority of Israeli Arabs would choose to exterminate us if they had the option to do so". In his younger days, he had been strongly in favour of the idea of Arab transfer out of Palestine.

In 2009, he told Maariv: "The tendency to conflict is the essence of the Arab. He is an enemy by essence. His personality won't allow him to compromise. It doesn't matter what kind of resistance he will meet, what price he will pay. His existence is one of perpetual war."

== Academic career ==
Having previously struggled to fit into Israeli academia without success, perhaps for a combination of personal and political reasons, Netanyahu nonetheless continued his academic activities upon his return to Israel. Though he still was unable to join the faculty of the Hebrew University, his mentor Joseph Klausner recommended him to be one of the editors of the Encyclopaedia Hebraica in Hebrew, and upon Klausner's death, Netanyahu became chief editor, in tandem with professor Yeshayahu Leibowitz.

He returned to Dropsie College, first as professor of Hebrew language and literature and chair of the department (1957–66), then as professor of medieval Jewish history and Hebrew literature (1966–68). Subsequently, he moved first to the University of Denver as professor of Hebraic studies, (1968–71), then to New York to edit a Jewish encyclopedia. Eventually he took a position at Cornell University as professor of Judaic studies and chair of the department of Semitic languages and literature, from 1971 to 1975. Following the death of his son Yonatan during the Entebbe hostage rescue operation in 1976, he and his family returned to Israel. At the time of his death, Netanyahu was a member of the Academy for Fine Arts and a professor emeritus at Cornell University.

Continuing his interest in Medieval Spanish Jewry, Golden age of Jewish culture in Spain and Portugal, Netanyahu wrote a book about Isaac Abrabanel and essays on the Spanish Inquisition and the Marranos. He developed a theory according to which the Marranos converted to Christianity not under compulsion but out of a desire to integrate into Christian society. However, as New Christians they continued to be persecuted due to racism, not purely for religious reasons, as previously believed. He argued that what was new in the 15th century was the Spanish monarchy's practice of defining Jews not religiously, but racially, by the principle of limpieza de sangre, purity of blood, which served as a model for 20th-century racial theories. Netanyahu rejected the idea that the Marranos lived double lives, claiming that this theory arose from Inquisition documents.

Netanyahu is perhaps best known for his magnum opus, Origins of the Inquisition in Fifteenth Century Spain. His publisher and friend Jason Epstein wrote of the book:

The 1,400-page work of scholarship overturned centuries of misunderstanding, and predictably it was faintly praised and in a few cases angrily denounced or simply ignored by a threatened scholarly establishment. Dispassionate scholars soon prevailed, and today Benzion’s brilliant revisionist achievement towers over the field of Inquisition studies.

His obituary in The New York Times stated: "Though praised for its insights, the book was also criticized as having ignored standard sources and interpretations. Not a few reviewers noted that it seemed to look at long-ago cases of anti-Semitism through the rear-view mirror of the Holocaust." Indeed, quite generally, Netanyahu regarded Jewish history as "a history of holocausts." Origins led him into a scholarly dispute with Yitzhak Baer. Baer, following earlier views, considered the Anusim (forced converts to Christianity) a case of Kiddush Hashem (sanctification of the name [of God]: i.e., dying or risking oneself to preserve the name of God). According to Baer, therefore, the converts chose to live a double life, with some level of risk, while retaining their original faith. Netanyahu, in contrast, challenged the belief that the accusations of the Inquisition were true, and considered the majority of converts "Mitbolelim" (cultural assimilationists) and willing converts to Christianity, claiming that the small number of forced converts who did not truly adhere to their new religion were used by the Inquisition as propaganda to allege a broader resistance movement. According to Netanyahu, Christian society had actually never accepted the new converts, for reasons of racial envy.

Netanyahu was a member of the American Academy for Jewish Research, the Institute for Advanced Religious Studies and the American Zionist Emergency Council. In the 1960s, he contributed to two more major reference books in English: the Encyclopedia Judaica and The World History of the Jewish People.

Awarded Doctorate Honoris Causa by the University of Valladolid (Spain) in 2001.

== Death ==
Netanyahu died on April 30, 2012, in his Jerusalem home, at the age of 102. He was survived by two of his sons, seven grandchildren and 12 great-grandchildren.

== In popular culture ==
Netanyahu and his family are portrayed in Joshua Cohen's novel The Netanyahus: An Account of a Minor and Ultimately Even Negligible Episode in the History of a Very Famous Family (New York Review Books, 2021), set in upstate New York in 1959–60. The novel won the Pulitzer Prize for Fiction in 2022.

== Awards ==
- 1995: National Jewish Book Award in the Sephardic Studies for The Origins of the Inquisition

== Published works ==
- Don Isaac Abravanel: Statesman and philosopher, 1953. Ithaca, 1998; The Jewish Publication Society, 2001.
- Toward the Inquisition: Essays on Jewish and Converso History in Late Medieval Spain, Ithaca, 1997.
- The Marranos of Spain: From the Late XIVth to the Early XVIth Century, 1966. Ithaca, 1999.
- The Origins of the Inquisition in Fifteenth Century Spain, New York: Random House, 1st edition August 1995.
- The Founding Fathers of Zionism Balfour Books & Gefen Publishing House, 2012. ISBN 978-1-933267159
