= Emmanuel Moreno =

Israeli soldier (1971–2006)

Emmanuel Moreno עמנואל מורנו
- Born: June 17, 1971; Paris, France
- Died: August 19, 2006 (aged 35); Baalbek, Lebanon
- Burial place: Mount Herzl
- Military career
- Allegiance: Israel
- Branch: Military Intelligence Directorate (Aman), Israel
- Rank: Lieutenant colonel
- Unit: Sayeret Matkal (The Special Operations Division)
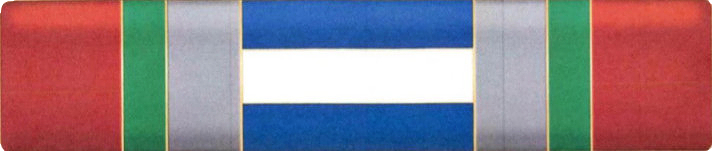
- Conflicts: South Lebanon conflict (1982–2000); First Intifada; Second Intifada 2006 Lebanon War

- Awards: Head of Regional Command Citation

Emmanuel Yehuda Moreno (Hebrew: עמנואל יהודה מורנו; June 17, 1971 – August 19, 2006), was an Israeli Lieutenant Colonel in the Israel Defense Forces' most elite unit, Sayeret Matkal (also known as the General Staff Reconnaissance Unit, or Unit 269), who died in combat at the end of the Second Lebanon War.

== Biography ==
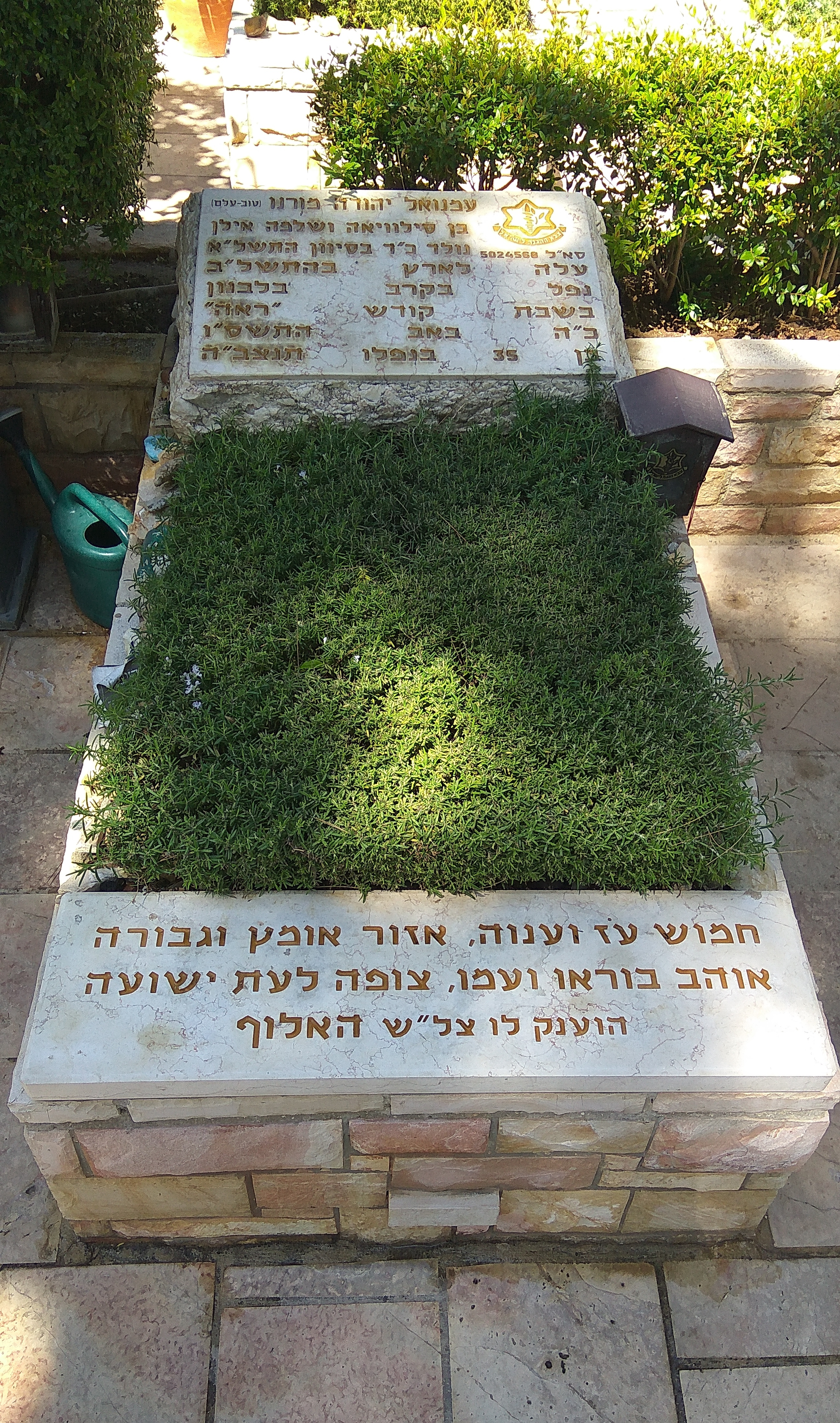
Grave of Emmanuel Moreno, Mount Herzl

Moreno was born in Paris, one of five sons born to Ilan and Sylvia Moreno. His parents were Maghrebi Jewish immigrants to France from North Africa: his father was from Morocco and his mother was from Tunisia. When he was one year old, his family immigrated to Israel. Moreno's grandmother, Ninette Moreno, was one of the passengers on Air France Flight 139, which was hijacked by Palestinian terrorists in 1976 and taken to Entebbe, where the passengers were rescued in Operation Entebbe.

Moreno and his four brothers grew up in Jerusalem. He was conscripted into the Israel Defense Forces in August 1990 and completed training for the elite Sayeret Matkal unit in December 1992. He ultimately became a career soldier, serving in Sayeret Matkal for 14 years up to his death. He participated in numerous operations in Lebanon during the South Lebanon conflict and in the Palestinian territories, nearly all of which remain classified. One of his comrades said that "during his service Emmanuel became the fighter who took part in the greatest number of operations in the unit's history. On more than one occasion, his level-headedness and courage made the difference between failure and yet another success story that shall remain classified. The squad commander once compared him to Bar-Kokhba, because we had not seen a fighter like him since." The only two operations that he is publicly acknowledged to have participated in are the abduction of Amal commander Mustafa Dirani in 1994 and the 2003 rescue of taxi driver Eliyahu Gorel after he had been kidnapped by Palestinians and held in a cellar in Beitunia.

Moreno took part in the 2006 Lebanon War and was killed at the war's end, after the ceasefire had already been announced. His unit had been operating in the Bekaa Valley when it was exposed and came under heavy fire, killing him.

The publication of Moreno's photograph is banned by the Israeli Military Censor. He remains the only Israeli soldier whose photographs have been forbidden for publication after his death. In 2018, a recording of Moreno's voice was publicized, taken from the ceremony where Moreno was granted his Lieutenant Colonel rank.

On April 27, 2008, the head of the IDF Intelligence Division awarded Emmanuel with the "Head of Regional Command Citation" (Hebrew: צל"ש אלוף) "for his numerous years of dedication to the security of the State of Israel and his participation in several IDF operations throughout the Second Lebanon War."

Moreno was married to Maya, whom he met in Neve Dekalim. The couple had three children: Aviya, Neria, and Noam-Yisrael.

His nephew Itay Moreno, a soldier in the Maglan commando unit, was killed in the Gaza war in 2023.
