= Christine Piatko =

Computer scientist

Christine Diane Piatko is a computer scientist known for her heavily cited publications on k-means clustering, high-dynamic-range imaging, computer graphics, and document classification.

Piatko is a 1986 graduate of New York University with a B.A. in Mathematics and Computer Science. She completed her Ph.D. in 1993 at Cornell University. Her dissertation, Geometric Bicriteria Optimal Path Problems, was supervised by Joseph S. B. Mitchell. She is an assistant research professor in the computer science department at Johns Hopkins University, and a research computer scientist in the Johns Hopkins Applied Physics Laboratory.
