= Sayeret Matkal =

Israeli special forces unit

- Unit insignia
- Active: 1957–present
- Country: Israel
- Branch: Israel Defense Forces
- Type: Special forces
- Size: Classified
- Part of: General Staff of the Israel Defense Forces; Aman (Special Operations Division)
- Garrison/HQ: Southern Israel
- Nickname: The Unit
- Motto: המעז מנצח (Who Dares Wins)
- Colors: Maroon beret
- Engagements: War of Attrition; Yom Kippur War; Palestinian insurgency in South Lebanon; Operation Entebbe; 1982 Lebanon War; South Lebanon conflict First Intifada; Second Intifada; 2006 Lebanon War; 2014 Gaza War; Gaza war

Commanders
- Notable commanders: Ehud Barak; Yonatan Netanyahu; Nehemiah Tamari; Uzi Dayan; Moshe Yaalon; Omer Bar-Lev; Benjamin Netanyahu; Iddo Netanyahu

The Sayeret Matkal (Hebrew: סיירת מטכ״ל) (formerly Unit 269 or Unit 262) (English: General Staff Reconnaissance Unit) is an elite special reconnaissance unit of the Israel Defense Forces (IDF). It is subordinate to the General Staff of the IDF.

Though primarily a field intelligence-gathering unit, conducting deep reconnaissance behind enemy lines to obtain strategic intelligence, Sayeret Matkal is also tasked with a wide variety of special operations, including black operations, combat search and rescue, counterterrorism, hostage rescue, HUMINT, irregular warfare, long-range penetration, conducting manhunts, and reconnaissance beyond Israel's borders.

While primarily subordinate to the General Staff, Sayeret Matkal is also the special operations component of the Military Intelligence Directorate (Aman). Its primary role is field intelligence-gathering and deep reconnaissance behind enemy lines, which aligns it closely with Aman's objectives.

The unit is modeled after the British Army's Special Air Service (SAS), taking the unit's motto "Who Dares Wins". The unit is the Israeli equivalent of the SAS.

== History ==
In 1954, Israel's first special operations unit—Unit 101—was disbanded following the outcry provoked by the Qibya massacre. This left the IDF without a dedicated special-forces unit other than the Navy's Shayetet 13, a naval commando unit that could not fully replace Unit 101. In 1957, Major Avraham Arnan, a former yeshiva student and Palmach fighter, petitioned the IDF General Staff to create a unit that could be dispatched to enemy-held territory to carry out top secret intelligence-gathering missions. Arnan's idea (backed by David Ben-Gurion and Yitzhak Rabin) was to create a unit that would recruit only the best and the brightest of Israeli youth. Prospective fighters were to be hand-picked, being physically and intellectually the best soldiers available. Originally part of Aman's Unit 504, Sayeret Matkal began to operate independently a year later as the General Staff's special operations force, modeled after the British Special Air Service. Members of the unit were trained by Bedouin trackers to obtain a better understanding of their adversaries. Established a year after the formation of Israel's first helicopter squadron, the close co-operation between the two units allowed Sayeret Matkal to deploy longer and deeper inside Arab territory than its predecessor. Arnan's vision for Sayeret Matkal (of which he was the first commander) was of a unit that would carry out strategic intelligence-gathering and other operations; as such it would receive its missions only from the General Staff. Sayeret Matkal would also evaluate new weapons and doctrines that could influence the entire IDF.

In the first years of the unit, it was manned by Palmach veterans, veterans of the intelligence corps, veterans of Unit 101 and the paratroopers unit. Among them Isaac Shoshan, Yair Harari, Eli Gil ("Daud"), Sami Nachmias, Charles Levy ("Salem"), Moshe Levin (Kukala), Shmuel Ben Zvi (Shemil), Yitzhak Ghibli ("The Little One"), Yehiel Amsalem – the commander of the first team in the unit, Meir Har-Zion, Avshalom Adam, Aharon Eshel, Micah Kapusta, Rami Kafkafi and many other young people from kibbutzim.

Its first operational activity was carried out in a dedicated assignment in Lebanon in May 1962. The success of this mission paved the way for the unit's second operation five months later in Syria. In the early 1960s, Sayeret Matkal conducted several intelligence-gathering operations in the Sinai Peninsula—the last of which was launched just four months before the outbreak of the Six-Day War. But, due to the extensive training, planning and preparation that had to be undertaken before its missions, Sayeret Matkal ended up not seeing any action during the war itself. It was however engaged extensively in the following War of Attrition. After 1967, with the rise of Arab terrorism perpetrated by groups such as the Palestine Liberation Organization (PLO), Sayeret Matkal began developing the first counterterrorism and hostage rescue techniques in the world. Beginning with Operation Isotope, the unit carried out several high-profile operations that thrust it into the limelight as an "elite paratroopers" unit (Sayeret Matkal's existence was classified at the time). In 1972, during the Munich Olympic hostage crisis, it was reported that Mossad head Zvi Zamir offered the assistance of Sayeret Matkal for the hostage rescue. However, the West German government rejected the offer, insisting that the Bavarian State Police would handle the crisis. In the subsequent Mossad assassinations following the Munich massacre, Sayeret Matkal struck the PLO in Beirut.

The Yom Kippur War in 1973 brought a profound change to the unit. With Israel fighting on two fronts and the General Staff busy with managing the war, Sayeret Matkal found itself without missions to perform. Sayeret Matkal officers then split into two camps: those who believed that the unit should be kept in reserve and not be lightly sent to missions where it could endure heavy casualties, and those that wanted to go into action, even if that meant missions with little planning and more akin to a commando force than to the strategic-oriented Sayeret Matkal. The latter prevailed and Sayeret Matkal was tasked with operations on both fronts. After the war, Sayeret Matkal began developing plans for wartime in advance, so that when war came, the unit could go into action immediately, without waiting for the General Staff's orders and missions. A reserve company of Sayeret Matkal was also designated specifically for cooperation with the Israeli Air Force, shown by the war to be lacking. This would later evolve into the Shaldag Unit.

In 1974, Sayeret Matkal suffered a heavy blow when a failed rescue attempt resulted in the Ma'alot massacre. The debacle led to the creation of the Yamam to deal with domestic counter-terrorism/hostage-rescue missions, while Sayeret Matkal would focus on foreign counter-terrorism/hostage-rescue. Two years later, on 4 July 1976, came the unit's most famous mission when it spearheaded Operation Entebbe to rescue hostages held in Uganda by at least six Palestinians and two German terrorists supported by regular Ugandan soldiers. The mission was a resounding success, although there were three hostages killed, as well as the commander of the unit, Lieutenant Colonel Yonatan Netanyahu.

Although a top-secret unit, Sayeret Matkal had tremendous influence on the IDF. It was the original developer of helicopter infiltration techniques in Israel. In addition, their extensive use of the Uzi led them to convince Israel Military Industries to produce an Uzi with a folding stock for increased accuracy while maintaining its small frame. In 2015, the unit received an honorable mention for its activities during Operation Protective Edge. In September 2023, the IDF announced a new pilot program that will allow women to join the unit for the first time, set to start in November 2024.

In the Gaza war, the unit had reportedly lost at least 11 soldiers and was preparing to liberate hostages captured by Hamas.

In September 2024, the unit raided an underground Iranian-built precision missile factory near the Syrian city of Masyaf – around 25 miles (40km) north of the Lebanese border. Operators roped down from hovering helicopters before engaging in a firefight with Syrian guards at the facility, killing around 18 people. The commandos then used explosives to blow up the underground facility – including sophisticated machinery. Commandos removed some equipment and documents during the raid.

== Recruitment and training ==
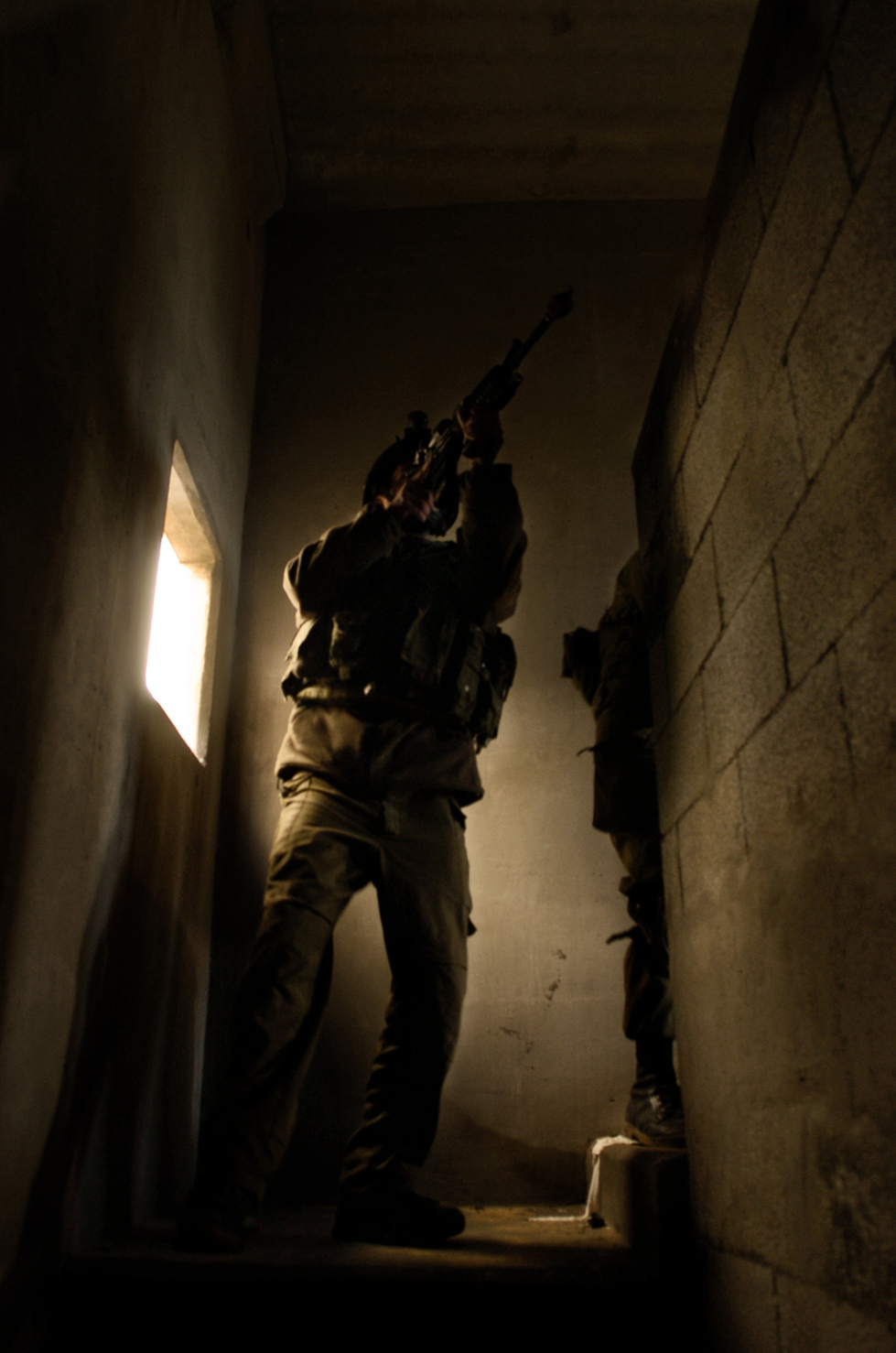
A Sayeret Matkal soldier

The unit was kept top-secret during its initial years and its very existence was never officially acknowledged until the 1980s. Most of its operations and capabilities are considered classified to this day. Fighters and commanders were selectively hand-picked, based on personal acquaintances and referrals. Since the 1970s, while still secretive, the unit opened to voluntary recruits. Twice a year it holds a notoriously gruelling selection camp (Gibbush) for potential recruits lasting several sleepless days. The recruits are constantly monitored by doctors and psychologists. Those who make it through with a passing grade are admitted. During the 1990s, this selection practice was picked up by other IDF special forces (Sayeret).

The basic requirements for being considered to serve in the unit are a medical profile of 97 (with no disqualifying clauses), a quality category ("kaba") of 52 or more, and an initial psychotechnic grading ("dapar") of 50 or more. Once admitted to the unit, the recruits' training lasts for about two years, with heavy emphasis on camouflage, combat and patrolling techniques in urban areas, defusing disposal of bombs and land mines, fast tactical shooting, living off the desert and mountain, martial arts, navigation, reconnaissance tactics, small unit tactics, tactical driving, tactical emergency medical, tracking tactics, unconventional raid tactics, navigational skills, small arms and light weapons, and other skills required for survival behind enemy lines. They must also complete the 120–150-kilometre (75–93 mi) Beret March in the final four days to receive their red beret. The training regime consists of the following:

- Four months of basic infantry training, held in the Paratroopers basic training base; it is part of the regular Paratroopers basic training routine.
- Two months advanced infantry training, within the unit.
- Three weeks parachuting course in the IDF Parachuting School.
- Five weeks counter-terror (CT) course in the IDF Counter-Terror Warfare School, followed by more inner-unit CT training.
- The rest of the training is dedicated to long-range reconnaissance patrol training, and especially to navigation/orienteering, which is of vast importance in the unit. While most of the orienteering training is done in pairs for safety reasons, as in every other unit in the IDF, Sayeret Matkal is one of the handful of IDF units which conducts long-range solo navigation exercises.

Toward the end of their training, Sayeret Matkal recruits, along with recruits for other special forces units and pilot cadets, undergo a two-week course in enduring captivity. After a surprise mock kidnapping, they are held in prison-like conditions and subjected to interrogation, threats, and physical violence, and forced to perform demeaning activities.

Today, all the soldiers in the unit undergo an officer's course at the end of their training and move on to hold positions in the unit as well as other IDF units. The combat soldiers are required to sign on for an additional 36 months in addition to their mandatory service term. Most of the combat soldiers will commence an undergraduate university degree towards the end of their service.

Although Sayeret Matkal has its own insignia, it is also one of only two units in the IDF, the other being Duvdevan, whose soldiers are not allowed to wear it in public due to its classified nature. This lack of insignia often leads to Sayeret Matkal operators being recognized as such, as the fact that Matkal troopers don't wear insignia is well known.

== Notable members ==
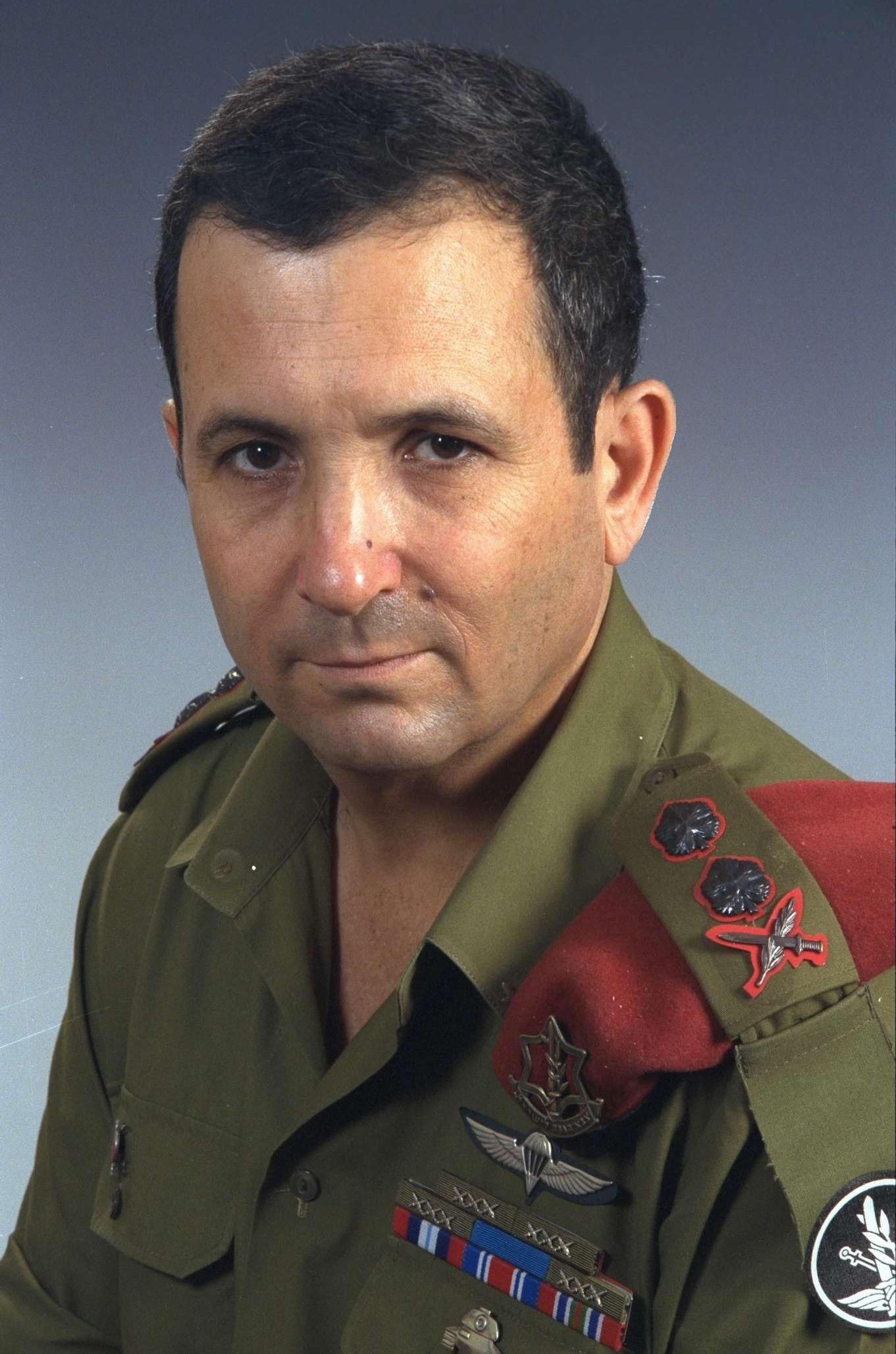
Ehud Barak

Sayeret Matkal veterans have gone on to achieve high positions in Israel's military and political echelons. Several have become IDF generals and members of the Knesset. Ehud Barak's career is an example: a draftee in 1959, he later succeeded Unit 101 commando Lt. Meir Har-Zion in becoming Israel's most decorated soldier. While with Sayeret Matkal, Barak led operations Isotope in 1972 and Spring of Youth in 1973. He later advanced in his military career to become the IDF Chief of Staff between 1991 and 1995. In 1999 he became the 10th Prime Minister of Israel.

- Nadav Argaman – team leader, later director of the Shin Bet.
- Doron Avital – commander 1992–1994. Member of 18th Knesset for Kadima.
- Shay Avital – unit commander during the 1982 Lebanon War, later first commander of the Depth Corps.
- Naftali Bennett – former Israeli Prime Minister, Defense Minister and leader of Yamina party.
- Muki Betser – second in command of Operation Entebbe. Founder of the Shaldag Unit.
- Nechemya Cohen – the Unit's and the IDF's most decorated soldier (with Barak). Killed in action. Beit Nechemya was built in his memory by "the Unit".
- Avi Dichter – unit fighter, later head of Israel's General Security Service (Shin Bet), later the minister of internal security.
- Daniel M. Lewin – co-founder of Akamai Technologies. He was the first victim of the September 11 attacks.
- Shaul Mofaz – unit deputy commander, later IDF Chief of Staff and former Defense Minister of Israel.
- Benjamin Netanyahu – unit team leader, current Prime Minister of Israel.
- Iddo Netanyahu – writer and radiologist. Benjamin Netanyahu's younger brother.
- Yonatan Netanyahu – unit commander, killed in Operation Entebbe. Benjamin Netanyahu and Iddo Netanyahu's older brother.
- Moshe Yaalon – unit commander, later IDF Chief of Staff, Strategic Affairs Minister of Israel and Defense Minister of Israel.
- Uzi Yairi – unit commander, formerly head of the IDF Paratroopers Brigade, killed in action while off-duty during Savoy Operation.
- Danny Yatom – unit deputy commander, later a General, head of Mossad and a Knesset member.
- Doron Kempel – unit deputy commander, called to lead the planning and preparation of Operation Bramble Bush.

There is a widely held misconception that former Israeli major general and former prime minister Ariel Sharon served in Sayeret Matkal. Although as a major, Sharon founded the IDF's first special-forces unit (Unit 101) in 1953, he never served in Sayeret Matkal.

== Operations ==
- 1968 – Operation Gift – sabotage of 14 Arab airliners in Beirut International Airport, Lebanon.
- 1969 – Operation Bulmus 6 – assault on fortified Green Island, Egypt (jointly with Shayetet 13).
- 1969 – Operation Raviv – raid on Egypt's Red Sea coast.
- 1972 – Operation Isotope – foiling the hijacking of Sabena Flight 571 in Tel Aviv, Israel (hostages rescue).
- 1972 – Operation Crate 3 – kidnapping 5 Syrian intelligence officers.
- 1973 – Operation Spring of Youth – killing Black September terrorist leaders in Beirut, Lebanon (jointly with Shayetet 13).
- 1973 – Yom Kippur War – recapture of Mount Hermon from Syrian commandos (jointly with Golani Brigade); rescue of Lt. Col. Yossi Ben Hanan behind enemy lines; deep interdiction ambushes in Egypt and Syria.
- 1974 – Ma'alot massacre – school hostages rescue.
- 1975 – Savoy Operation – hotel hostages rescue.
- 1976 – Operation Thunderbolt – hostage rescue in Entebbe, Uganda.
- 1978 – Coastal Road massacre – bus hostages rescue.
- 1980 – Misgav Am hostage crisis – Kibbutz nursery hostages rescue.
- 1982 – 1982 Lebanon War – deep reconnaissance ahead of Israeli forces (snipers managed to target Yasser Arafat although they were not allowed to fire)
- 1984 – Kav 300 affair – bus hostages rescue.
- 1988 – Assassination of Abu Jihad, in Tunis, Tunisia.
- 1989 – Kidnapping of Sheik Abdul-Karim Obeid, Lebanon (see Ron Arad).
- 1992 – Operation Bramble Bush – plan to assassinate Iraqi president Saddam Hussein.
- 1994 – Mustafa Dirani kidnapping, Lebanon (see Ron Arad).
- 1994 – Nachshon Wachsman – failed hostage rescue.
- 2006 – Second Lebanon War: Operation Sharp and Smooth – disrupt weapons smuggling (jointly with the Shaldag Unit); other operations to disrupt weapons smuggling (in one of them the force was discovered and Lieutenant Colonel Emmanuel Moreno was killed and two others were wounded in the ensuing gun battle).
- 2007 – Collecting soil samples in Syria prior to Operation Orchard, the bombing of an alleged Syrian nuclear reactor.
- 2017 – Infiltration into Syria to place a listening device in a meeting room of Islamic State of Iraq and the Levant external operations personnel. The intelligence recovered led to the 2017 electronics ban.
- 2023 – Gaza war – rescue of Israeli hostages and to assassinate key Hamas leaders in the Gaza Strip

== See also ==
- Israel Defense Forces
- Israeli Special Forces Units

Similar foreign special forces units:

- List of special forces units
