= Yonatan Netanyahu =

Israeli military officer (1946–1976)

- יוֹנָתָן נְתַנְיָהוּ
- Last known photo of Netanyahu, taken shortly before his death in Operation Entebbe
- Born: March 13, 1946; New York City, US
- Died: July 4, 1976 (aged 30); Entebbe, Uganda
- Education: Harvard University; Hebrew University of Jerusalem
- Spouse: Tirza Goodman (m. 1967; div. 1972)
- Relatives: See Netanyahu family
- Military career
- Branch: Ground Forces
- Service years: 1964–1976
- Rank: Sgan Aluf
- Nickname: Yoni (יוֹנִי)
- Unit: Paratroopers Brigade
- Commands: Sayeret Matkal
- Conflicts: Arab–Israeli conflict; Six-Day War; War of Attrition; Yom Kippur War; Operation Entebbe †
- Awards: Medal of Distinguished Service

Yonatan "Yoni" Netanyahu (Hebrew: יוֹנָתָן "יוֹנִי" נְתַנְיָהוּ, pronounced [jonaˈtan ˈjoni netanˈjahu]; March 13, 1946 – July 4, 1976) was an American-born Israeli military officer who commanded Sayeret Matkal during the Entebbe raid. The raid was launched in response to the 1976 hijacking of an international civilian passenger flight from Israel to France by Palestinian and German militants, who took control of the aircraft during a stopover in Greece and diverted it to Libya and then to Uganda, where they received support from Ugandan dictator Idi Amin. Though Israel's counter-terrorist operation was a success, with 102 of the 106 hostages being rescued, Netanyahu was killed in action – the only Israeli soldier killed during the crisis.

The eldest son of the Israeli professor Benzion Netanyahu and brother of future Israeli prime minister Benjamin Netanyahu, Yonatan was born in New York City and spent much of his youth in the United States, where he attended high school. After serving in the Israeli military during the Six-Day War, he briefly attended Harvard University before transferring to the Hebrew University of Jerusalem in 1968; soon thereafter, he left his studies and returned to military service in Israel. He joined Sayeret Matkal in the early 1970s and was awarded the Medal of Distinguished Service for his conduct in the Yom Kippur War. After his death, Operation Entebbe was renamed "Operation Yonatan" in his honor.

== Background ==
Yonatan Netanyahu was born in New York City, the eldest son of Tzila (née Segal; 1912–2000) and Benzion Netanyahu (1910–2012), then the executive director of the New Zionist Organization of America, later a professor of history at Cornell University. His mother had been born in Petah Tikva, in what is now Israel, then in the Ottoman Empire's Mutasarrifate of Jerusalem, while his father was born in Warsaw and immigrated to Mandatory Palestine in 1920. He was named after his paternal grandfather, rabbi Nathan Mileikowsky, and Colonel John Henry Patterson, who formerly commanded the Jewish Legion and attended his circumcision. His two brothers were Benjamin and Iddo. Benjamin was elected Prime Minister of Israel in 1996, in 2009 and reelected in 2013, 2015, 2020 and 2022. Iddo, the youngest of the three, is a radiologist and writer. All three brothers served in Sayeret Matkal.

Netanyahu's family returned to the newly independent state of Israel in 1949 when he was two and settled in Jerusalem. In 1956 the family again moved to the United States before returning to Israel in 1958. Netanyahu attended high school at Gymnasia Rehavia in Jerusalem. In 1963, when he was in 11th grade, the family returned to the United States, where he attended Cheltenham High School in Wyncote, Pennsylvania. He was a classmate of Baseball Hall of Fame member Reggie Jackson. While in high school, he began contemplating his purpose in life, when he wrote in a 1963 letter, "The trouble with the youth here is that their lives are meager in content. I ought to be ready at every moment of my life to confront myself and say—'This is what I've done'." After graduating in June 1964, he returned to Israel to enlist in the Israel Defense Forces. He joined the Paratroopers Brigade and fought in the Six-Day War.

Netanyahu married his long-time girlfriend Tirza "Tuti" Goodman on August 17, 1967. Shortly after their wedding, they flew to the U.S., where Netanyahu enrolled at Harvard University. He took classes in philosophy and mathematics, excelling in both, and was on the Dean's List at the end of his first year. However, feeling restless at being away from Israel, especially with Israel skirmishing against Egypt during the War of Attrition, he transferred to Jerusalem's Hebrew University in 1968. In early 1969, he left his studies and returned to the army. His father described those decisions, saying "He was dreaming of resuming his studies and planned to do so time and again. Yet he always conditioned his return to Harvard on the relaxation of the military tensions."

In 1972, he and Tuti were divorced. Netanyahu was living with his girlfriend of two years, Bruria, at the time of his death.

== Military career ==
After graduating high school, Netanyahu joined the Israel Defense Forces in 1964. He volunteered to serve in the Paratroopers Brigade, and excelled in the Officer Training Course. He was eventually given command of a paratroopers company.

Netanyahu's 1964 yearbook portrait from Cheltenham High School

In 1967 he considered college, but the constant threat of war made him stay in Israel: "This is my country and my homeland. It is here that I belong," he wrote. On June 5, 1967, during the Six-Day War, his battalion fought the battle of Um Katef in Sinai, then reinforced the Golan Heights battle. During the Golan Heights battle, he was wounded while helping rescue a fellow officer, Yossi Ben-Hanan, who lay wounded deep behind enemy lines. He was decorated for valor after that war, earning the Medal of Distinguished Service.

After being wounded, he returned to the U.S. to study at Harvard University. But after a year he felt the need to return to Israel to rejoin the army. "At this time," he wrote in a letter, "I should be defending my country. Harvard is a luxury I cannot afford." He next returned to Harvard in the summer of 1973, but again gave up academic life for Israel's military.

By 1970 he was leading an anti-terrorist reconnaissance unit, Sayeret Matkal (Israeli special forces), and in the summer of 1972 was appointed as the unit's deputy commander. That year he commanded a raid into Syria named Operation Crate 3, in which senior Syrian officers were abducted and held as bargaining chips to be later exchanged in return for captive Israeli pilots. The following year he participated in Operation Spring of Youth, in which the terrorists and leadership of Black September were selectively killed by Sayeret Matkal, Shayetet 13 and the Mossad.

During the Yom Kippur War in October 1973, Netanyahu commanded a Sayeret Matkal force in the Golan Heights that thwarted attempts to land Syrian commandos. Together with troops from the Golani Brigade, Netanyahu's force stopped a Syrian commando attack on Camp Yitzhak in a battle in which 41 Syrian commandos were killed along with two Sayeret Matkal commandos and four Golani Brigade soldiers. During the same war, he also rescued Lieutenant Colonel Yossi Ben Hanan from Tel Shams, while Ben Hanan was lying wounded behind Syrian lines.

Following the war, Netanyahu was awarded Medal of Distinguished Service (Hebrew: עיטור המופת), Israel's third highest military decoration, for his rescue of Ben Hanan. Netanyahu then volunteered to serve as an armor commander, due to the heavy casualties inflicted on the Israeli Armored Corps during the war, with a disproportionate number of these in the officer ranks. Netanyahu excelled in Tank Officers course, and was given command of the Barak Armored Brigade, which had been shattered during the war. Netanyahu turned his brigade into the leading military unit in the Golan Heights.

=== Operation Entebbe ===
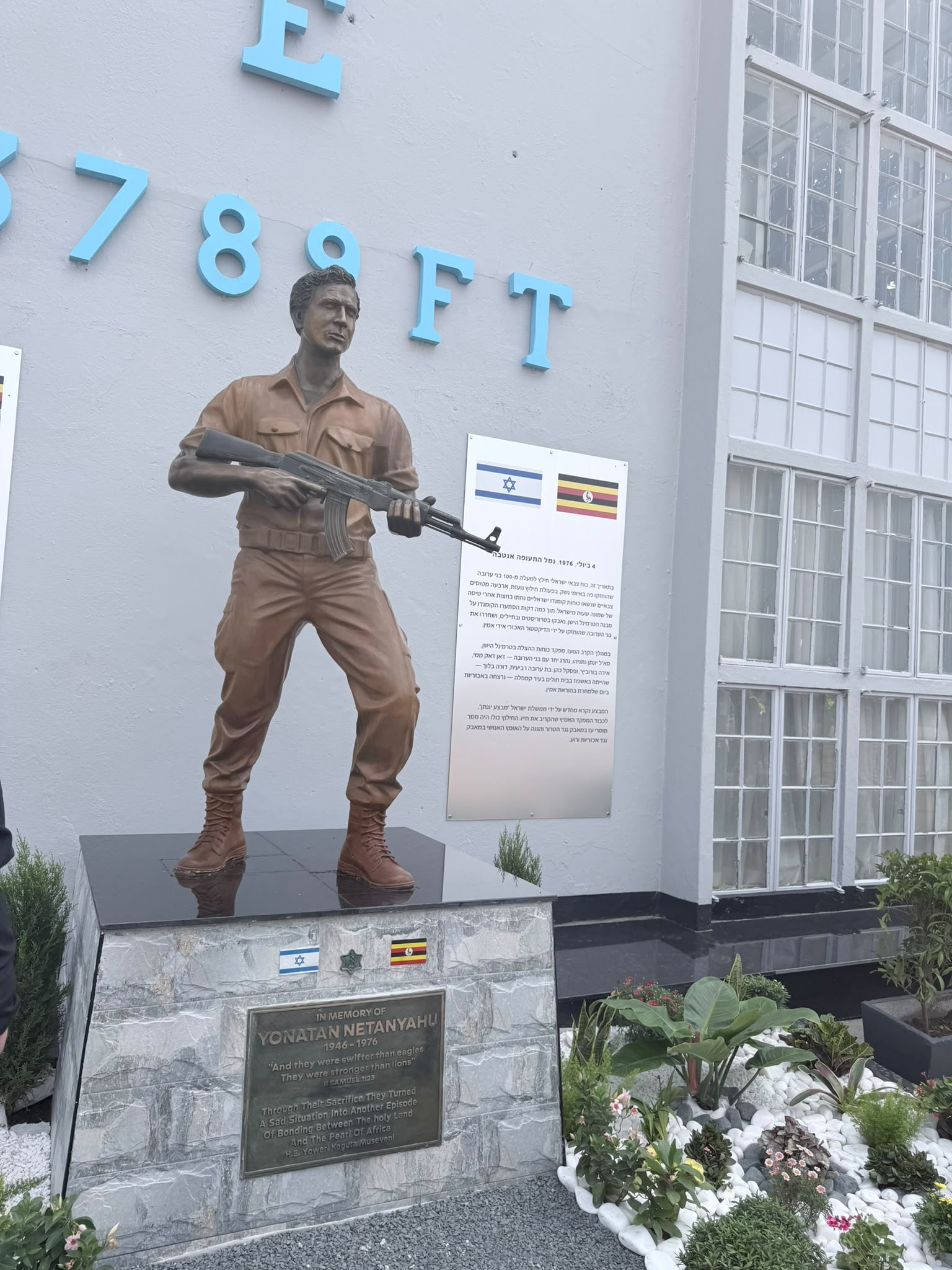
The statue of Jonathan Netanyahu at Entebbe International Airport in Uganda; sculptor Itay Zalait

Netanyahu was killed in action on July 4, 1976, while commanding the rescue mission during Operation Entebbe. He was the only Israeli soldier killed during the raid (along with three hostages, all of the Revolutionary Cells members, all of the Popular Front for the Liberation of Palestine members, and dozens of Ugandan soldiers). The commonly accepted version of his death is that Netanyahu fired on Ugandan soldiers, and was shot in response by a Ugandan soldier from the airport's control tower. His family refused to accept this verdict, and insisted instead that he was killed by the German commanding the hijackers. Netanyahu was shot outside the building being stormed, and soon died in the arms of Efraim Sneh, commander of the mission's medical unit. The operation itself was a success, and was renamed as Mivtsa Yonatan ("Operation Jonathan" in English) in his honor.

Netanyahu was buried in Jerusalem's Military Cemetery at Mount Herzl on July 6 following a military funeral attended by enormous crowds and top-ranking officials. Shimon Peres, then Defense Minister, said during the eulogy that "a bullet had torn the young heart of one of Israel's finest sons, one of its most courageous warriors, one of its most promising commanders – the magnificent Yonatan Netanyahu."

There are memorial trees that have been planted in his honor in front of his graduating high school, Cheltenham High School, and a memorial plaque is located in the lobby.

In 2026, Chief of Defence Forces of the Uganda People's Defence Force General Muhoozi Kainerugaba unveiled a statue of Netanyahu outside the old Entebbe terminal where Netanyahu was fatally wounded during Operation Entebbe. During the unveiling ceremony, Kainerugaba stated that the "memorial stands not only in remembrance of a distinguished soldier, but also as a tribute to the enduring values he embodied: courage in the face of danger, unwavering commitment to protecting innocent lives, and steadfast devotion to duty."

=== Personal letters ===
In 1980 many of Netanyahu's personal letters were published. Author Herman Wouk describes them as a "remarkable work of literature, possibly one of the great documents of our time." Many of his letters were written hurriedly under trying conditions in the field, but according to a review in The New York Times, give a "convincing portrayal of a talented, sensitive man of our times who might have excelled at many things yet chose clearsightedly to devote himself to the practice and mastery of the art of war, not because he liked to kill or wanted to, but because he knew that, as always in human history, good is no match for evil without the power to physically defend itself."

=== Biographical play and film ===
To Pay the Price is a play by Peter-Adrian Cohen based in part on Netanyahu's letters. The play, produced by North Carolina's Theatre Or, opened off Broadway in New York in June 2009 during the Festival of Jewish Theater and Ideas. The play had been scheduled to run at the New Repertory Theatre company near Boston, Massachusetts. The run was canceled after pressure by the Netanyahu family, because the theater was intending to run the play as a companion piece to My Name Is Rachel Corrie.

The documentary film Follow Me, released in May 2012, is based on Netanyahu's life story and his final mission, leading the successful rescue of Israeli hostages at Entebbe, at the cost of his life. The narration during the film uses transcripts from his personal letters and other spoken words.

== Legacy ==
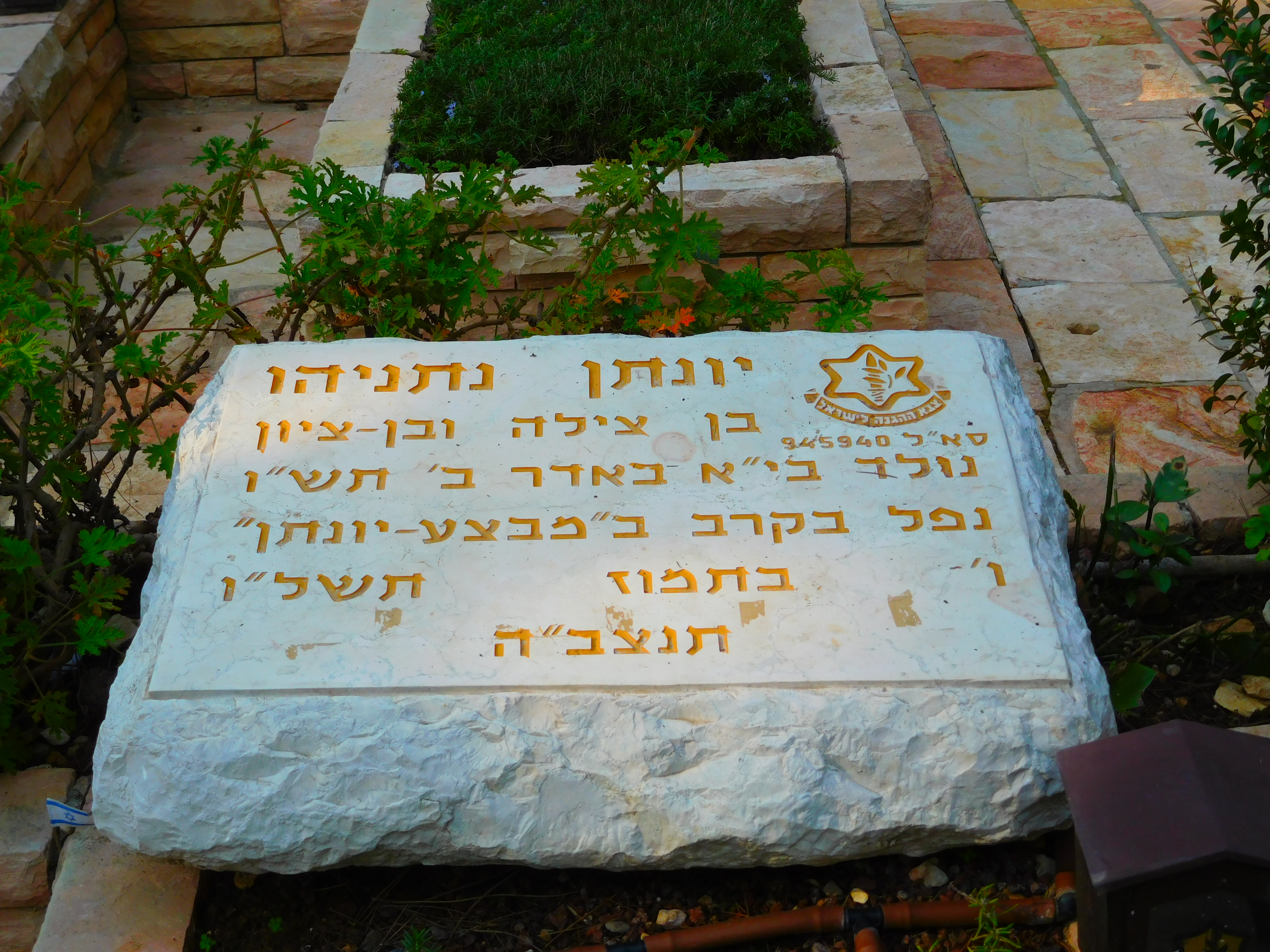
Netanyahu's grave on Mount Herzl, with the IDF emblem at the top right

Author Herman Wouk wrote that Netanyahu was already a legend in Israel even before his death at the age of 30. Wouk wrote:

He was a taciturn philosopher-soldier of terrific endurance, a hard-fibered, charismatic young leader, a magnificent fighting man. On the Golan Heights, in the Yom Kippur War, the unit he led was part of the force that held back a sea of Soviet tanks manned by Syrians, in a celebrated stand; and after Entebbe, "Yoni" became in Israel almost a symbol of the nation itself. Today his name is spoken there with somber reverence.

Israeli Prime Minister Benjamin Netanyahu said his own "hard line against all terrorists" came as a result of the death of his brother.

=== The Jonathan Institute ===
Netanyahu's father commented in 1977 that Yoni would have been disappointed with the West's reactions against terrorism. "He would, I think, express great dismay and concern at the weakness and indecision displayed by some democracies toward this phenomenon," he said. "He felt that there are principles that must be upheld if civilization itself is to survive."

In 1979, Jonathan Institute was founded by Benjamin Netanyahu to sponsor international conferences on terrorism. One of its first speakers, U.S. Senator Henry M. Jackson, then Chairman of the Armed Services Committee, who gave a talk titled "Terrorism as a Weapon in International Politics", described the purpose of the conference and its relation to Jonathan Netanyahu. Two conferences organized by the Jonathan Institute, in Jerusalem in July 1979 and Washington, D.C. in June 1984, were attended by government officials and attracted significant press coverage.

== Bibliography ==
- Self-Portrait of a Hero: From the Letters of Jonathan Netanyahu 1963–1976; Netanyahu, Jonathan/Netanyahu, Benjamin/Netanyahu, Iddo (1998); Warner Books. ISBN 0-446-67461-3
- The Letters of Jonathan Netanyahu : The Commander of the Entebbe Rescue Operation; Jonathan Netanyahu (2001); Gefen Publishing House. ISBN 978-965-229-267-4 (variation of the above)
- Yoni: Hero of Entebbe; Max Hastings (1979); DoubleDay. ISBN 978-0-385-27127-1 (a biography of Yoni Netanyahu)
- Entebbe: A Defining Moment in the War on Terrorism – The Jonathan Netanyahu Story; Iddo Netanyahu (2003); Balfour Books. ISBN 978-0-89221-553-9
- Yoni's Last Battle: The Rescue at Entebbe, 1976; Iddo Netanyahu, Yoram Harzony (2001); Gefen Publishing House. ISBN 978-965-229-283-4
- Yoni Netanyahu: Commando at Entebbe; Devra Newberger Speargen (1997); Jewish Publication Society of America. ISBN 978-0-8276-0642-5
