= Nathan Netanyahu =

Israeli computer scientist (born 1951)

Nathan S. Netanyahu
- נָתָן נְתַנְיָהוּ
- Born: November 28, 1951 (age 74)
- Education: University of Maryland, College Park (PhD)
- Known for: Nearest neighbor search, k-means clustering, computer chess, image registration
- Scientific career
- Fields: Computer science
- Workplaces: Bar-Ilan University
- Doctoral advisor: David Mount, Azriel Rosenfeld

Nathan S. Netanyahu (Hebrew: נָתָן נְתַנְיָהוּ; born 28 November 1951) is an Israeli computer scientist and a professor of computer science at Bar-Ilan University.

Netanyahu is the son of mathematician Elisha Netanyahu and Supreme Court of Israel justice Shoshana Netanyahu, the nephew of historian Benzion Netanyahu, and the cousin of current Prime Minister of Israel Benjamin Netanyahu. He did his graduate studies at the University of Maryland, College Park, earning a Ph.D. in 1992 under the supervision of David Mount and Azriel Rosenfeld.

Netanyahu has co-authored highly cited research papers on nearest neighbor search and k-means clustering. He has published many papers on computer chess, was the local organizer of the 12th World Computer Chess Championship in 2004, and was program co-chair for the 4th International Conference on Computers and Games, colocated with the WCCC. Another frequent topic in his research is image registration.
