= Olmert =

Olmert is a surname. Notable people with the surname include:

- Aliza Olmert (born 1946), German-Israeli artist, photographer, author and social worker; wife of Ehud Olmert
- Dana Olmert (born 1972), Israeli left-wing activist, literary theorist and editor; daughter of Ehud Olmert
- Ehud Olmert (born 1945), Israeli politician, the 12th Prime Minister of Israel (4 January 2006 – 31 March 2009)
- Michael Olmert (born 1940), professor of English (at University of Maryland, College Park, Maryland) and writer
- Mordechai Olmert (1908–1998), Israeli politician; father of Ehud Olmert
- Shaul Olmert (born 1975), Israeli entrepreneur and business executive; son of Ehud Olmert
