= Ben-Artzi =

Ben-Artzi (בן־ארצי) is a Hebrew surname literally meaning "son of my land". Notable people with the surname include:

- Ephraim Ben-Artzi was an Israeli general and businessman
- Sara Netanyahu née Ben-Artzi
- Shmuel Ben-Artzi was a Polish-born Israeli writer, poet and educator
- Yossi Ben-Artzi
