= David Makovsky =

American academic

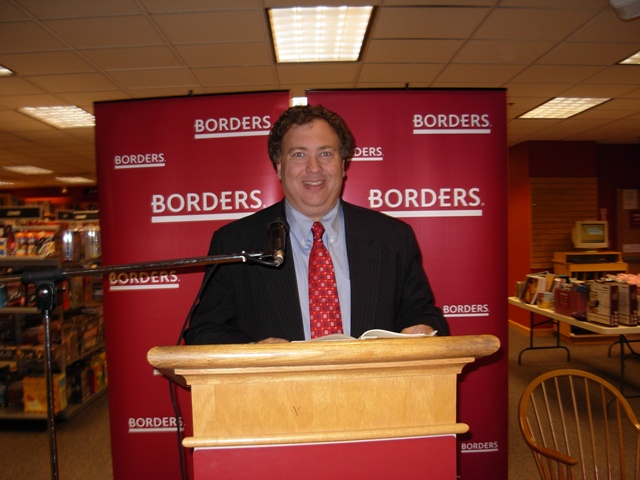
- Makovsky at a book-signing in 2009
- Education: Columbia University (BA); Harvard University (MA)
- Occupations: Foreign policy scholar, author, journalist
- Employer(s): Washington Institute; Johns Hopkins University
- Awards: National Press Club's 1994 Edwin M. Hood Award for Diplomatic Correspondence

David Makovsky (born June 21, 1960) is the director of the Washington Institute for Near East Policy Project on the Middle East Peace Process. he serves as a adjunct professor at Johns Hopkins University's Paul H. Nitze School of Advanced International Studies (SAIS) in the Middle Eastern studies program.

He is coauthor of the book Myths, Illusions, & Peace with Dennis Ross. Mr. Makovsky's commentary on U.S. policy towards the Middle East and Middle East peace process has been broadcast on the PBS NewsHour with Jim Lehrer. His writings can be found in The New York Times, The Wall Street Journal, The Washington Post, and Foreign Affairs.

== Education, career and personal life ==
David Makovsky received his bachelor's degree from Columbia University and his master's in Middle East studies from Harvard University.

From 1989 to 2000, David Makovsky extensively covered the peace process between Israel and Palestine, in his roles as executive editor and editor-in-chief (1999-2000) of The Jerusalem Post, and diplomatic correspondent for Israel's major daily Haaretz. During this time, he also served as special Jerusalem correspondent to U.S. News & World Report, for which he subsequently served as contributing editor.

In 1994 he was awarded the National Press Club's Edwin M. Hood Award for Diplomatic Correspondence, in recognition for his cover story on PLO finances that he co-wrote for the magazine.

In July of that year, Mr. Makovsky became the first journalist writing for an Israeli publication to visit Damascus. This had been made possible with the personal intervention of then Secretary of State Warren Christopher. Mr. Makovsky would go on to make five trips to Syria.

Mr. Makovsky also made history in March 1995 when he was given unprecedented permission, with the help of U.S. officials, to file reports from Jeddah, Saudi Arabia, for an Israeli publication.

== The Washington Institute for Near East Policy ==
Currently, David Makovsky is Senior Fellow and the Ziegler distinguished fellow at the Washington Institute for Near East Policy (WINEP), a pro-Israel think tank formed in 1985.

At its inception, the Institute's main focus was on Arab-Israeli issues and overall U.S. Middle East policy. In the 1990s, the scope of the Institute's research grew as the Soviet Union fell and the first Gulf War took place. This expansion included a particular focus on Turkey and the rise of Islamic politics in understanding the political trends in the post-Soviet Middle East.

The range of issues covered by the Institute expanded once again after September 11, this time driven by the focus of the U.S. on the Middle East as a central foreign policy concern. The Institute has thus dedicated new resources to assist the U.S. government in understanding and countering Islamist extremism, terrorism, and nuclear proliferation.

== Published work ==
David Makovsky is the author of the books Making Peace With The PLO: The Rabin Government's Road To The Oslo Accord, Engagement Through Disengagement: Gaza and the Potential for Renewed Israeli-Palestinian Peacemaking, and more recently Myths, Illusions, & Peace: Finding a New Direction for America in the Middle East. Myths, Illusions, & Peace, coauthored with Dennis Ross, sets out to prove the many myths about the Middle East false, and help set a new course for American foreign policy in the Middle East.

In addition, he is the author or coauthor of several Washington Institute monographs, including Lessons and Implications of the Israel-Hizballah War: A Preliminary Assessment (2006); Olmert's Unilateral Option: An Early Assessment (2006); Hamas Triumphant (2006); Engagement Through Disengagement: Gaza and the Potential for Israeli-Palestinian Peacemaking (2005); A Defensible Fence: Fighting Terror and Enabling a Two State Solution (2004).

David Makovsky contributed to a collection on U.S. involvement in the First Gulf War, Triumph without Victory (Random House, 1992). He is also the author of many op-ed pieces, which have appeared in publications such as New York Daily News, USA Today, The Wall Street Journal, and The Jerusalem Post.

== Media ==
David Makovsky's commentary on the Arab–Israeli conflict have appeared in The New York Times, The Washington Post, the Los Angeles Times, The Wall Street Journal, the Financial Times, the International Herald Tribune, the Chicago Tribune, Foreign Affairs, Foreign Policy, and The National Interest.

Also, he has appeared on PBS NewsHour with Jim Lehrer, Charlie Rose, the Mimi Geerges Show, National Public Radio, C-SPAN, Voice of America, Alhurra Free Hour and others.

== Myths, Illusions, & Peace ==
Among the areas covered in Myths, Illusions, & Peace are the Israeli–Palestinian conflict, Iran, and the history behind the current events in these regions.

== Sources ==
- Appearances on C-SPAN
- "David Makovsky". 28 June 2015. https://www.washingtoninstitute.org/experts/view/makovsky-david
- "Our History". 20 August 2009. http://washingtoninstitute.org/templateC11.php?CID=20&newActiveSubNav=Our%20History&activeSubNavLink=templateC11.php%3FCID%3D20&newActiveNav=aboutUs
- "Op-Ed Articles Recently Published by David Makovsky". 20 August 2009. http://davidmakovsky.com
- "Interview Given by David Makovsky". 20 August 2009. https://web.archive.org/web/20100906103729/http://www.davidmakovsky.com/category/interview-given-by-david-makovsky
- "Myths, Illusions, & Peace: Finding a New Direction for America in the Middle East". 20 August 2009. http://washingtoninstitute.org/templateC04.php?CID=310
