= Sonia Peres =

First Lady of Israel from 2007 to 2011

- סוניה פרס
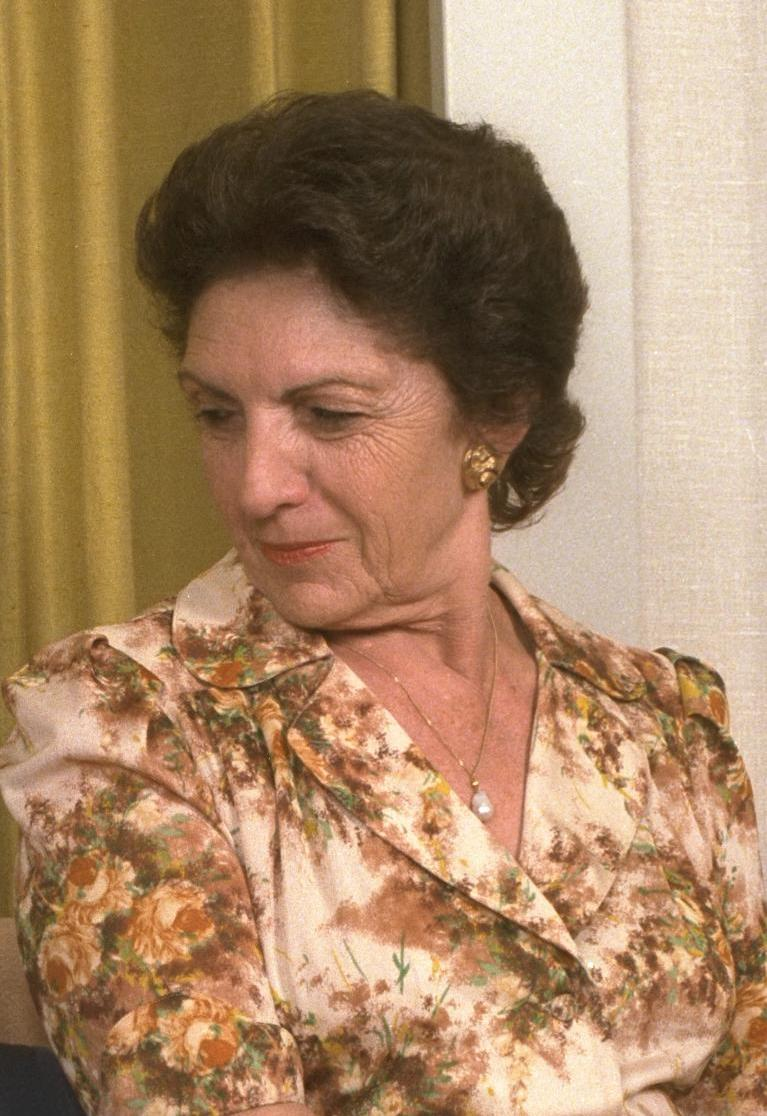
- Peres in 1984

First Lady of Israel
- In role 15 July 2007 – 20 January 2011
- President: Shimon Peres
- Preceded by: Gila Katsav
- Succeeded by: Nechama Rivlin (2014)

Spouse of the Prime Minister of Israel
- In role 4 November 1995 – 18 June 1996
- Prime Minister: Shimon Peres
- Preceded by: Leah Rabin
- Succeeded by: Sara Netanyahu
- In role 13 September 1984 – 20 October 1986
- Prime Minister: Shimon Peres
- Preceded by: Shulamit Shamir
- Succeeded by: Shulamit Shamir
- In role 22 April 1977 – 21 June 1977; Acting
- Prime Minister: Shimon Peres
- Preceded by: Leah Rabin
- Succeeded by: Aliza Begin

Personal details
- Born: Sonia Gelman; 27 March 1923 Mizocz, Wołyń Voivodeship, Polish Republic (now Mizoch, Rivne Oblast, Ukraine)
- Died: 20 January 2011 (aged 87) Tel Aviv, Israel
- Spouse: Shimon Peres (m. 1945)
- Children: Tsvia; Yoni; Chemi
- Occupation: practical nurse

Sonia Peres (née Gelman; 27 March 1923 – 20 January 2011) was the wife of President and Prime Minister of Israel, Shimon Peres.

Peres served in the British Army during World War II, and for many years volunteered anonymously for sick children and the disabled. She married Shimon in May 1945. Together, they helped found kibbutz Alumot, and had three children and eight grandchildren.

Sonia rarely appeared in public eye, preferring to play a backstage role in her husband's six-decade political career.

== Early life ==
Sonia Gelman was born in the now-Ukrainian town of Mizocz, then in the Second Polish Republic, to Malka "Mamcha" and Yaakov Gelman. In 1927, she immigrated to Mandatory Palestine with her parents, her older sister Batya, and her younger brother Itzik. The Gelman family was one of the first to leave the town for Palestine, and their departure caused great excitement: farewell ceremony was held, which included a party and speeches attended by all the residents. The family settled in the Ben Shemen Youth Village, when Malka was employed as the housemother of the institution, and Yaakov served as a yardman and carpentry teacher.

Gelman studied at the Ben Shemen youth village where she lived, and where she met Szymon Persky, later Shimon Peres. Peres joined the Gar'in that was founded by kibbutz Alumot, and Sonia stayed in the village to complete her matriculation studies. Although their relationship continued after graduating, mainly through correspondence, during World War II the two separated, with Shimon remaining on the kibbutz, and Sonia enlisting to the British Army.

== British Army ==
Sonia served as a practical nurse, in a field hospital in the Western Desert during the North African campaign. Her job was to assist the professional staff in everything needed to treat the wounded. She later served as an army truck driver. According to Peres, she was expelled from the hospital after slapping the head nurse in the face for calling her a "damn native" and was subsequently sent to a heavy vehicle driving course at the Mina camp near the pyramids.

== Israeli activist and married life ==
In May 1945, after completing her service in the British Army and returning to Palestine, she married Shimon Peres. Sonia Peres was a housewife who chose to stay away from the media and fiercely maintained her privacy and the privacy of her family, despite her husband's extensive political career. Over the years, Peres has volunteered for various activities designed to help the needy in Israeli society. Among other things, she assisted in the distribution of food products to the needy, and also worked extensively for IDF widows. In one case, Peres adopted the children of one of the widows, upon her death, and even let them live for a period of time in the prime minister's official resident. However, her voluntary activity was under a heavy veil of secrecy, due to Peres' unwillingness to publicize her activity.

== Spouse of the Prime Minister of Israel ==
=== 1984 – 1986 ===
Shimon Peres took over as Israeli prime minister in September 1984, after many years of unsuccessful attempts to win it over. This softened Sonia Peres' hostility to her husband's public and political activities. Peres has fulfilled some of the symbolic roles of a prime minister's wife, mainly hosting leaders and women leaders abroad. For example, she attended the official reception at the Ben-Gurion Airport to Prime Minister of Denmark Poul Schlüter in September 1985 and accompanied a tour of US Vice President George Herbert Walker Bush and his wife Barbara in Israel in July 1986. However, during the two years she served as the prime minister's wife, she continued to refuse to be interviewed, and as far as is known, even refrained from any involvement in political issues her husband engaged in as part of his job.

=== 1995 – 1996 ===
After the assassination of Prime Minister Rabin Sonia was the prime minister's wife for the second and final time in her life. This time, too, she refrained from appearing in the prime minister's office, and most of the office's staff did not even recognize her face. During the elections to the Fourteenth Knesset and of the Prime Minister, she did not take any active role in her husband's election campaign, nor did she attend the debate between Peres and Benjamin Netanyahu, which was one of the highlights of the election. In contrast, hours before the election results were published, family members and close friends gathered at Peres' house, where she hosted them.

== First Lady of Israel ==
With the election of Shimon Peres as president, Sonia Peres announced that she would not move with him to the president's official residence and would stay in their private apartment in Neve Avivim. Ever since they lived separately, following her husband breaking his promise that being elected chairman of the Labor Party in 2002 would be his last public job. During this period she changed her name to Sonia Gal, an abbreviation of her maiden name Gelman.

== Death ==
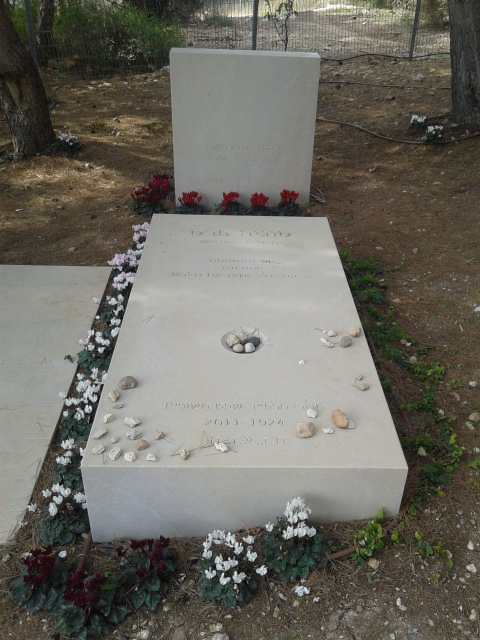
Sonia Peres' grave in the cemetery of the Ben Shemen Youth Village

Sonia died on January 20, 2011, in her apartment in Tel Aviv. At her request, she was buried in the cemetery of the Ben Shemen Youth Village and not in the place designated for her, next to her husband, in the Helkat Gedolei HaUma on Mount Herzl.

Honorary titles
Preceded by Gila Katsav	First Lady of Israel; 2007–2011	Vacant Title next held by Nechama Rivlin
