= Paula Ben-Gurion =

Israeli public figure (1892–1968)

- פולה בן-גוריון
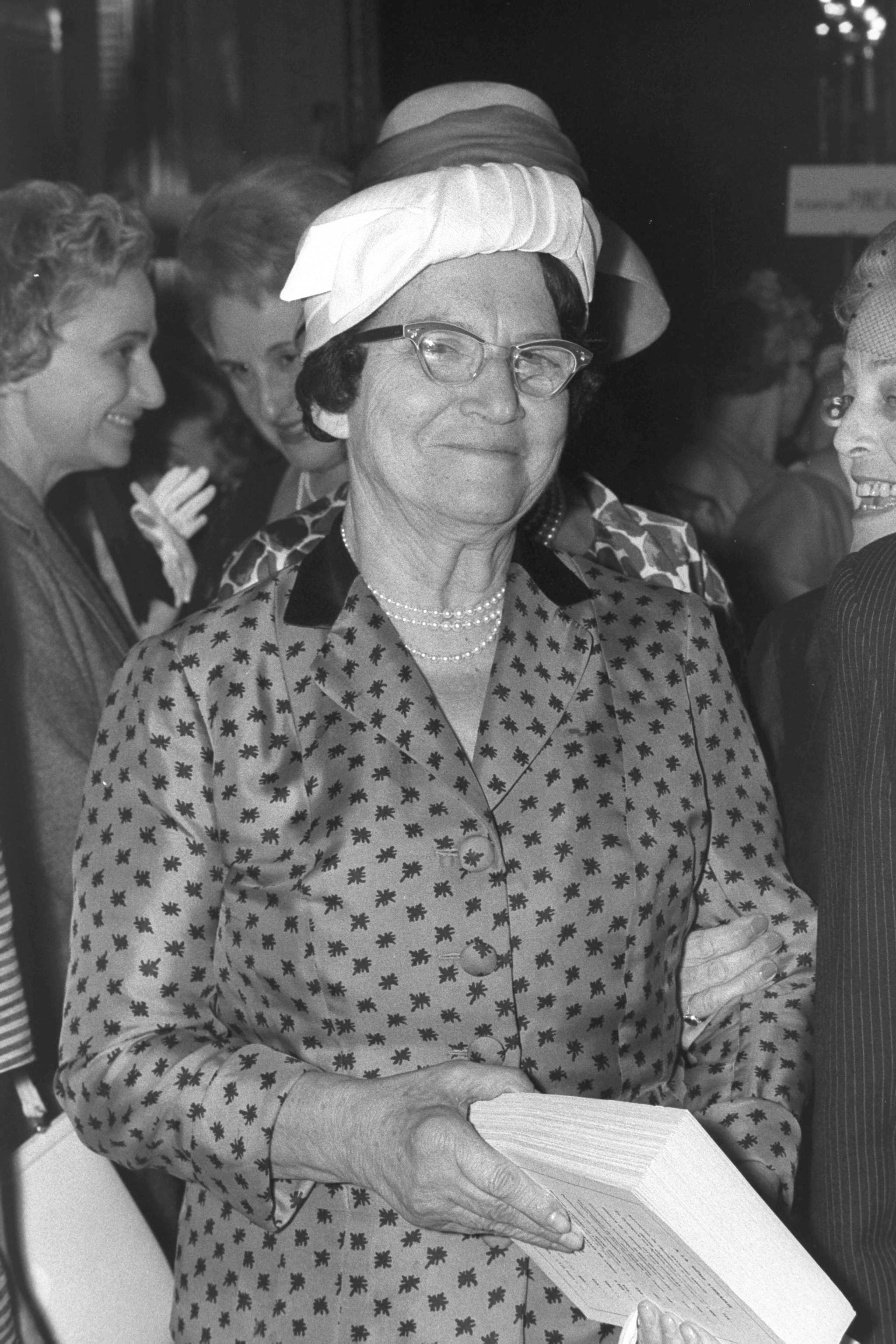
- Paula Ben-Gurion, 1955

Spouse of the Prime Minister of Israel
- In role 3 November 1955 – 26 June 1963
- Prime Minister: David Ben-Gurion
- Preceded by: Tzippora Sharett
- Succeeded by: Miriam Eshkol
- In role 17 May 1948 – 7 December 1953
- Prime Minister: David Ben-Gurion
- Preceded by: Title established
- Succeeded by: Tzippora Sharett

Personal details
- Born: Paulina Munweis; 8 April 1892 Minsk, Russian Empire (now Belarus)
- Died: 29 January 1968 (aged 75) Be'er Sheva, Israel
- Resting place: Ben-Gurion Tomb National Park
- Spouse: David Ben-Gurion (m. 1917)
- Children: 3
- Education: Newark Beth Israel Medical Center
- Occupation: Nurse

Paula Ben-Gurion (née Munweis; 1892–1968) was the spouse of the first prime minister of Israel, David Ben-Gurion. Born in the Russian Empire, she migrated to the United States at a young age. There she trained as a surgical nurse and became an anarchist. She married Ben-Gurion, despite their disagreements on Zionism, and followed him to settle in Palestine. She dedicated her life to caring for her husband and raising their three children. During the 1930s, she attended the World Zionist Congress in Switzerland. Following the Israeli Declaration of Independence, her husband became the country's first prime minister and Paula served as his spouse. She subsequently became a prominent public figure in Israeli society, communicating with the press and attending public events. She also cared for her husband and managed their household in Tel Aviv, judging who would be permitted to see him and how long meetings would go on for. They retired to the Sde Boker kibbutz in the Negev Desert, where they were buried alongside each other.

== Early life ==
Pauline Munweis was born in the Belarusian city of Minsk, in the Russian Empire, in 1892. She migrated to the United States in 1904, settled in New York City and learned the English language. There Munweis trained as a nurse, specialising in surgical nursing, at the Beth Israel Hospital in Newark, New Jersey.

Munweis mostly associated with other first-generation Jewish immigrants. She was known to be friendly, although she also had a reputation for being outspoken and blunt in conversation. She was an anarchist and an anti-Zionist, and was deeply inspired by the Jewish anarchist Emma Goldman. She felt at home in the United States and considered herself American; she did not understand the Zionists' desire to move to Palestine. She would remain opposed to Zionism throughout her entire life, preferring to dedicate herself to other causes.

Munweis lived and worked in the house of a Jewish doctor, who had opened his New York home to activists of the Labor Zionist political party Poale Zion. There she met the activist David Ben-Gurion, who had moved to the United States following the outbreak of World War I. Ben-Gurion had difficulty with personal relationships, but was attracted both by Munweis' warmth and unreserved style. In the summer of 1916, she volunteered to help Ben-Gurion write his book, The Land of Israel Past and Present, by copying passages from books at the New York Public Library. They began a romantic relationship while working together and soon grew to love each other. Munweis said of Ben-Gurion that, "as soon as he opened his mouth–I felt he was a great man".

== Marriage to David Ben-Gurion ==
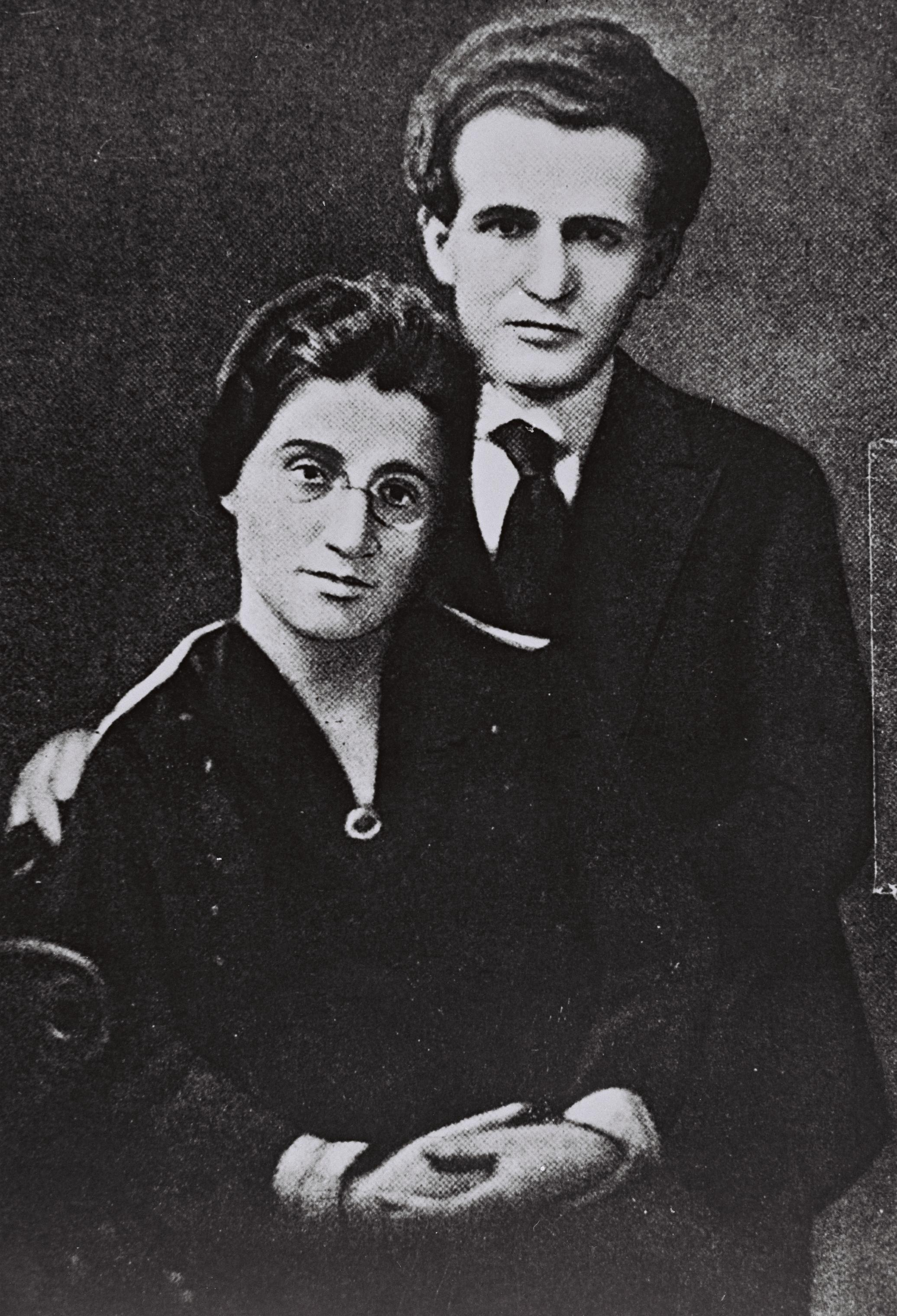
Paula Munweis and David Ben-Gurion in 1918

On 5 December 1917, Munweis and Ben-Gurion married each other in a civil ceremony at the New York City Hall. This surprised Ben-Gurion's fellow activists, who did not even know he and Munweis were in a relationship. They refused to seek sanctification for their marriage from a rabbi, despite repeated pleas by religious officials throughout their life together. Understanding that they did not share each others' views on Zionism, Ben-Gurion had warned her that, if they married, she would have to move with him to Palestine, which at the time was a poor country without modern public utilities. He also told her that he planned to enlist in the nascent Jewish Legion and fight in the Palestine campaign against the Ottoman Empire. She decided to marry him anyway, hoping she would be able to dissuade him from going to Palestine and signing up to the Legion. Munweis took her husband's surname, Ben-Gurion. She also began using Paula as her first name, going by what her husband called her. Before long, she had given up her career as a nurse to commit to married life. She left the Beth Israel hospital, two months before she was due to graduate with her diploma, despite pleas from her friends. According to Israeli historian Anita Shapira, "she made him her life's work". Shapira wrote that Paula was not an intellectual or emotional partner for Ben-Gurion, and instead dedicated herself to caring for him. She introduced him to personal hygiene practices such as regularly bathing, brushing his teeth and even changing his underwear, which he had previously been unaccustomed to.

In April 1918, after only five months of marriage, Ben-Gurion informed Paula that he had enlisted in the Legion and was about to be deployed to Palestine. Paula, having just found out that she was pregnant, broke down in tears; she would have to give birth and raise their child alone. She tried to convince him not to leave, but he responded that he believed his cause was "greater and more sacred than anything in the world", including her. Left alone while waiting for their first child, she became severely depressed. In his letters to her from the front, he took responsibility for having left her and reaffirmed his love for her, but continued to justify his actions, believing that his Zionist ideals would eventually bring them "divine happiness" and "uninhibited love". He wrote to her that, if he had not enlisted, then he believed he would have been "unworthy of you bearing my child". On 11 September 1918, Paula gave birth to their daughter; following her husband's wishes, she named her Geula (the Hebrew word for "Redemption"). She wrote that their baby was pretty, despite resembling her father.

A year after the war ended, Paula finally reunited with her husband in Palestine. She had agreed to emigrate purely out of obligation to her husband. She insisted on travelling first class, and after a six-week journey, she and her daughter arrived in November 1919. The family then travelled to London, where Paula gave birth to a son; they named him Amos, after the Jewish prophet. They then moved to the Polish city of Płońsk, where they stayed with Ben-Gurion's family for over a year while Ben-Gurion himself travelled around for conferences. Paula had a tense relationship with her in-laws, frequently criticising their poor hygiene. She also struggled with the poor standard of living in the city, having to boil the contaminated municipal water. In 1925, she gave birth to their third child, another daughter, who they named Renana. Paula refused to bear him a fourth child, despite his desire for another. By then, their relationship had deteriorated; Ben-Gurion spent much of his time away from home and communicated with Paula in an increasingly formal manner, expressing less affection towards her. Many of his letters to her were not intended to be kept private, and some were specifically intended for people other than her to read. According to British historian Elizabeth Monroe, "Paula [was] a mere shadow" in Ben-Gurion's correspondence during this period.

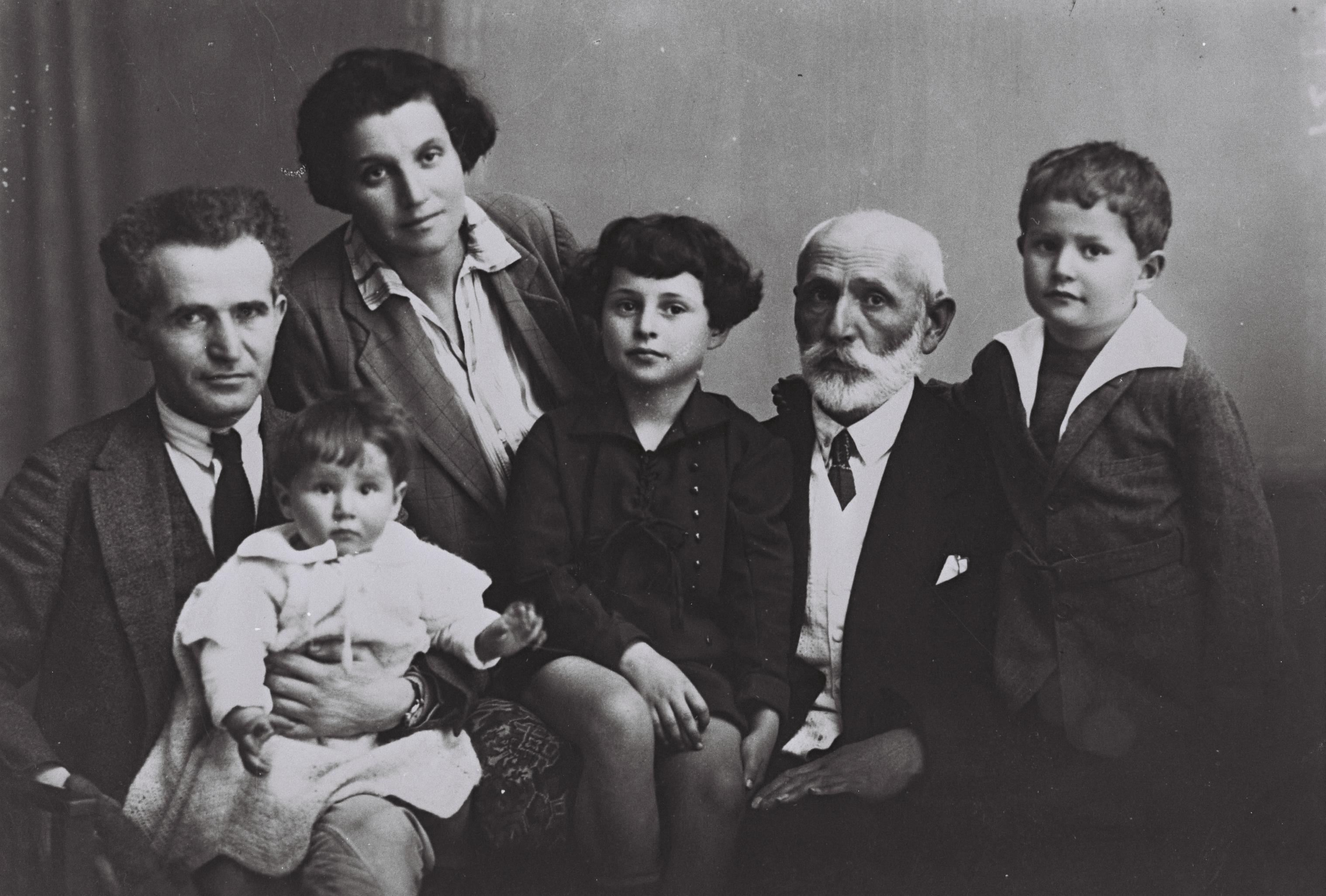
Paula Ben-Gurion and family, 1929

In the early 1930s, the family moved into a newly-built house in Tel Aviv. They all stayed in a single room, while Paula rented the other rooms out to families on holiday in the city. In May 1935, Paula discovered that, over the previous four years, her husband had been having an affair with a woman named Rega Klapholz during his trips to Europe; she forced him to end the relationship after Klapholz arrived in Palestine. In August 1935, Paula was delegated to the Nineteenth Zionist Congress in Lucerne; she set sail along with Rachel Yanait Ben-Zvi, Dov Hoz, Abba Hushi, Berl Katznelson, Golda Meir and David Remez, with whom she spearheaded an initiative to establish a shipping company under the Jewish Agency. Following the congress, Paula and her husband settled in rural Switzerland. Her husband attempted to reconcile with her, but she did not enjoy the location as much as him and did not join him on his walks through the mountains. In August 1937, Paula attended the Twentieth Zionist Congress in Basel, where she clashed with Chaim Weizmann over his disrespect towards her husband. By the late 1930s, Paula shared her husband's interests in their correspondence with each other.

Following the outbreak of World War II and the Battle of France in 1940, Paula's husband wrote to her of his hope in the governments of Britain and the United States to win the war against Nazi Germany. He frequently praised British prime minister Winston Churchill in his letters to her during this period. During the war, Paula's son Amos was wounded while serving in the Jewish Brigade and was hospitalised in Liverpool, where he fell in love with a Manx nurse. Paula objected to her son marrying a gentile and attempted to pressure him not to go through with it, but the wedding went ahead despite her protests in 1946. Paula was incensed when her husband welcomed their new daughter-in-law into the family and helped her emigrate to Palestine.

== Spouse of the prime minister ==
On 14 May 1948, Paula witnessed her husband declaiming the Declaration of Israeli Independence at the Tel Aviv Museum, which resulted in the establishment of the State of Israel. David Ben-Gurion became the first prime minister of Israel, with Paula serving as the spouse of the prime minister from 1948 to 1953. From this point onward, she and her husband sent each other less correspondence; Elizabeth Monroe supposed that they were likely spending more of their time together. In an interview with Mira Avrech, published in Yedioth Ahronoth, Paula spoke at length about her husband's personal and political life, giving anecdotes of his daily routine and habits, as well as the lead-up to the Declaration of Independence. As spouse of the prime minister during her husband's first term, her outfits were designed by her friend Lola Beer Ebner, who also designed outfits for First Lady Vera Weizmann and other women in Israeli high society. Paula's presence at fashion shows, at a time of economic crisis when basic necessities were being rationed, drew criticism from journalists and the wider public.

She continued taking care of her husband by ensuring he ate, slept and dressed well. She frequently turned away people visiting her husband, including people she thought might exhaust him and those who she did not like. In biographies about her husband, Paula has frequently been depicted as an "angry gatekeeper" who "bark[ed]" at visitors, and contrasted with descriptions of her husband's warmth. She once interrupted a meeting to bring her husband a drink. When Isaiah Berlin met the Ben-Gurions in Tel Aviv in 1950, he recalled Paula rejecting her husband's offer to serve their guest a coffee or an orange juice, saying "water would be much easier"; Berlin accepted the water. She would openly confront her husband whenever she thought he was wrong about something. At a speech her husband gave at Lod Airport, when he complained that many young Jews did not go on aliyah and only donated their money, Paula interjected "that's important too, isn't it?"

On 7 December 1953, Ben-Gurion resigned as prime minister, and the following week, he and Paula moved to Sde Boker, a kibbutz in the Negev desert. He had not considered her wishes when he made the decision for them to settle in the desert. She was forced to leave behind a full life in Tel Aviv, and was not happy with the move to a kibbutz in the desert, where she would live an ascetic lifestyle alongside people who were much younger than herself. She nevertheless oversaw the design of their new cottage, which would have a large study and separate bedrooms, and enforced strict standards of hygiene in her home as well as in the collective kitchen. She did not like the taste of the food served by the kibbutz kitchen and insisted that her husband eat her own "kutch-mutch" – a bland but healthy meal – twice a day.

In 1955, Ben-Gurion returned to his post as prime minister. He moved to Jerusalem, where he held a Bible studies class every Saturday afternoon; Paula found the classes "terribly bor[ing]" and thought her husband only held them out of obligation to learn about Jewish history. During the Suez Crisis of 1956, when her husband was sick, she almost refused entry to Yaakov Herzog, but was convinced that the matter was urgent and allowed him into their room. From then on, Herzog was one of only a few people who Paula would allow to visit her husband; he would tap on her bedroom window whenever he needed her to let him in. In 1963, she and her husband attended the funeral of Shlomo Lavi, the founder of the kibbutz movement. That same year, her husband resigned again as prime minister and retired to Sde Boker. At meetings of the Sde Boker bible study group, Paula would usually be the one to call an end to each session, in order to ensure her husband got enough rest. Whenever she left the kibbutz to visit Tel Aviv, her husband sent her frequent telegrams telling her he missed her and asking for her to come back. During this time, Paula became an admirer of the right-wing politician Menachem Begin, and over the course of the 1960s, she was happy to see her husband's personal relationship with Begin improve. Paula was one of only a few women whose image appeared on the frontpage of Israeli newspapers during the Six-Day War.

== Death and legacy ==
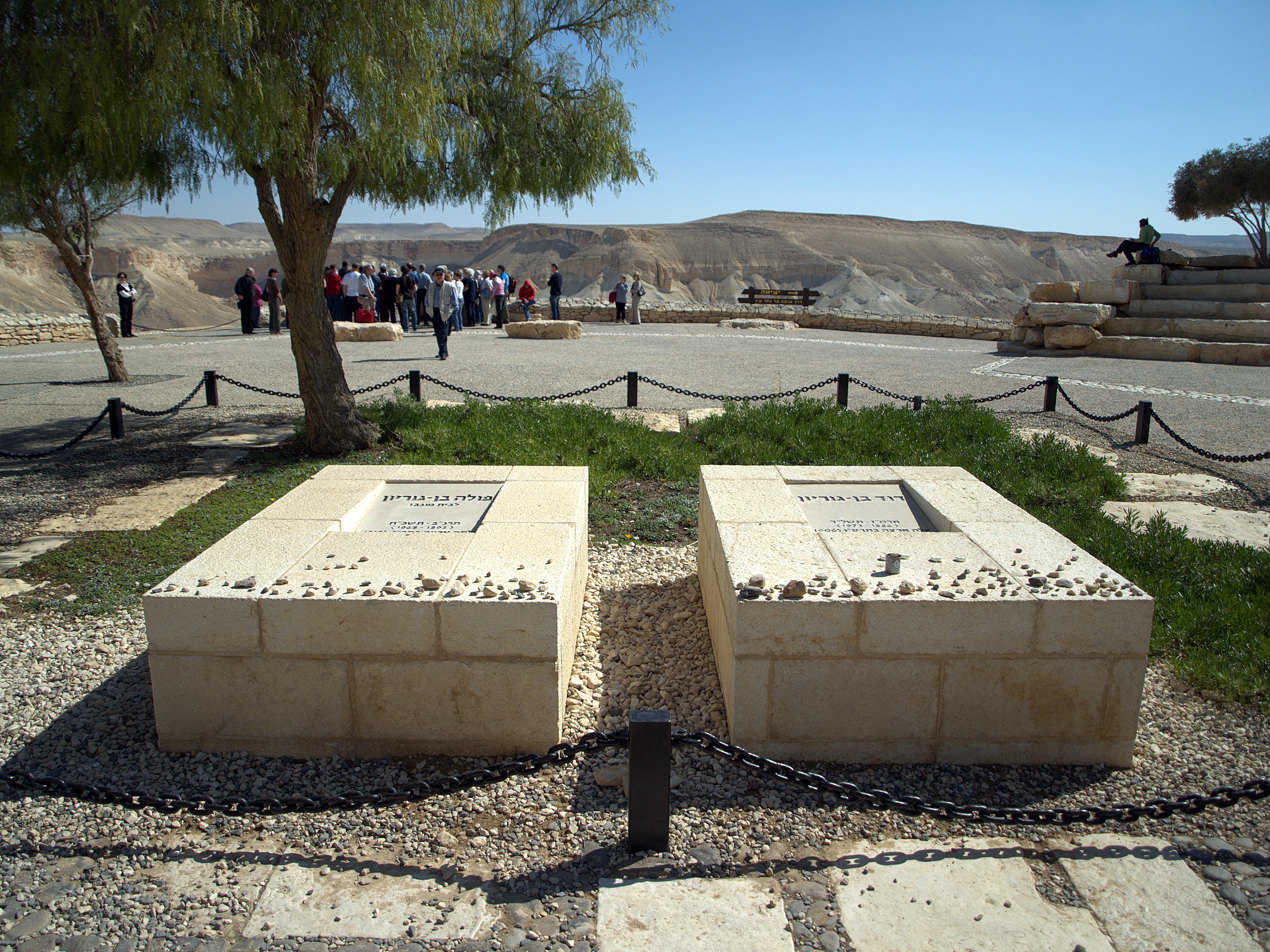
Gravestones of Paula (left) and David Ben-Gurion (right) in the Ben-Gurion Tomb National Park

Paula Ben-Gurion died in the Beer Sheba Hospital on 29 January 1968, at 76 years old. At her deathbed, her husband read the verse "thou wentest after me in the wilderness, in a land that was not sown" (Jeremiah 2:2). He subsequently retired from politics and public life. David Ben-Gurion had never discussed with Paula where she would have liked her body to be buried. He decided that her body would be buried on a cliff next to the Midreshet Sde Boker, in a small plot surrounded by trees, which he had intended for his own body. She received a simple funeral at Sde Boker, where it was attended by family and members of the Israeli government, and conducted by the chief military rabbi Shlomo Goren. She was given a eulogy by Devora Netzer, who described Paula as the prime minister's "helpmate". The site of her burial was renovated extensively, building a ceremonial plaza over her own grave and moving her gravestone away from her actual resting place.

Paula's husband was left feeling lonely after her death and fell into a deep depression. He lived alone in their house and continued eating her "kutch-mutch" to honour her memory. He also spoke very little to other people in the kibbutz, keeping mostly to his small circle of bodyguards and his secretary. He wrote that, after Paula's death, his only remaining close friends were Shlomo Zemach and Rachel Beit-Halakhmi. David Ben-Gurion died on 3 December 1973, in Paula's former bedroom in their home in Tel Aviv. His body was buried alongside Paula's. Per a request in his will, no eulogies were given to him at the couple's gravesite. In contrast to Paula's funeral, a modest event where mourning and emotions had been freely expressed, his own funeral was carried out as an unemotional state affair. Their burial place has since become a secular pilgrimage site.

The Ben-Gurion home in Tel Aviv was turned into a museum, in which David Ben-Gurion was centred as the protagonist of the exhibition, while Paula was relegated to a secondary role. Her own bedroom was covered in photographs of her husband. Architect Arieh Sharon designed a dining hall for a kibbutz in the Negev desert, which he named after Paula, but it was never constructed. A school in Jerusalem, named after Paula Ben-Gurion, was established to provide education to both secular and orthodox Jewish students; its attempt at integration quickly collapsed, with orthodox parents insisting their children be segregated from the secular students. On the 50th anniversary of Paula's death, in January 2018, a conference was held at the Ben-Gurion museum to commemorate her; all the presentations were given by men, and they were followed by a general discussion about the spouses of famous men. During the April 2019 Israeli legislative election, Sara Netanyahu complained that the Israeli press "gave more credit to Paula Ben Gurion than to her".

== Bibliography ==
- Aron, Hadas (2019). "Contesting the Nation: Negotiating National Narratives and the Jewish Settlements" (PDF). Nations and Nationalism. 25 (4): 1386–1411. doi:10.1111/nana.12498.
- Bar-Zohar, Michael (2016). Yaacov Herzog: A Biography. Halban Publishers. ISBN 978-1-905559-86-2.
- Berlin, Isaiah (1986). "Memories of brief meetings with Ben-Gurion". Jewish Quarterly. 33 (3): 6–9. doi:10.1080/0449010X.1986.10703685 (inactive 12 January 2026).
- Chazan, Meir (2021). "Aliya from 'affluent countries' and David Ben-Gurion's descent from the political scene". Israel Affairs. 27 (3): 402–426. doi:10.1080/13537121.2021.1915513.
- Cohen-Hattab, Kobi (2015). "The Test of Maritime Sovereignty: The Establishment of the Zim National Shipping Company and the Purchase of the Kedmah, 1945–1952". Israel Studies. 20 (2): 110–134. doi:10.2979/israelstudies.20.2.110.
- Feige, Michael; Ohana, David (2012). "Funeral at the edge of a cliff: Israel bids farewell to David Ben-Gurion". Journal of Israeli History. 31 (2): 249–281. doi:10.1080/13531042.2012.710773.
- Glass, Joseph B. (2008). "American Jewish Women and Palestine, Their Immigration, 1918-1939.". In Kark, Ruth; Shilo, Margalit; Hasan-Rokem, Galit (eds.). Jewish Women in Pre-state Israel: Life History, Politics, and Culture. Brandeis University Press. pp. 63–83. ISBN 978-1-58465-702-6.
- Halevi, Sharon (2003). "She Who Must Be Obeyed: The Media and Political Spouses in Israel". Women's Studies in Communication. 26 (2): 165–190. doi:10.1080/07491409.2003.10162458.
- Helman, Anat (2011). A Coat of Many Colors: Dress Culture in the Young State of Israel. Academic Studies Press. ISBN 978-1-64469-326-1.
- Helmreich, William B. (1999). The enduring community: the Jews of Newark and MetroWest. Transaction Publishers. ISBN 978-1-56000-392-2.
- Kraut, Alan M.; Kraut, Deborah A. (2007). Covenant of Care: Newark Beth Israel and the Jewish Hospital in America. Rutgers University Press. ISBN 978-0-8135-3910-2.
- Lachover, Einat (2009). "Women in the Six Day War through the eyes of the media". Journal of Israeli History. 28 (2): 117–135. doi:10.1080/13531040903169685.
- Laden, Sonja (2003). "Domesticity and Domestic Consumption as Social Responsibility in la-'Isha, an Israeli Women's Weekly, 1947–1959". In Shechter, Relli (ed.). Transitions in Domestic Consumption and Family Life in the Modern Middle East: Houses in Motion. Palgrave Macmillan. pp. 85–109. doi:10.1057/9781403982698_5. ISBN 978-1-4039-8269-8.
- Lavie-Dinur, Amit; Karniel, Yuval; Lavie, Yael (2022). "Journalists versus politicians: Twitter usage during the 2019 Israeli elections". The Journal of Communication and Media Studies. 8 (1): 1–24. doi:10.18848/2470-9247/CGP/v08i01/1-24.
- Levenson, Alan (2019). "David Ben-Gurion, the Bible, and the Case for Jewish Studies". In Schapkow, Carsten; Hödl, Klaus (eds.). Jewish Studies and Israel Studies in the Twenty-First Century: Intersections and Prospects. Bloomsbury Publishing. ISBN 978-1-7936-0510-8.
- Lewin, Eyal (2013). Ethos Clash in Israeli Society. Bloomsbury Publishing. ISBN 978-0-7391-8407-3.
- Litvinoff, Barnet (1988). "David Ben-Gurion: A Centennial Assessment". In Frankel, William (ed.). Survey of Jewish Affairs, 1987. Associated University Presses. pp. 44–60. ISBN 978-0-8386-3322-9.
- Masalha, Nur (2015). "Settler-Colonialism, Memoricide and Indigenous Toponymic Memory: The Appropriation of Palestinian Place Names by the Israeli State". Journal of Holy Land and Palestine Studies. 14 (1): 3–57. doi:10.3366/hlps.2015.0103.
- Monroe, Elizabeth (1972). "Review: Letters to Paula by David Ben-Gurion". International Affairs. 48 (2): 347. doi:10.2307/2613501. JSTOR 2613501.
- Neuman, Eran (2023). Arieh Sharon and Modern Architecture in Israel: Building Social Pragmatism. Taylor & Francis. ISBN 978-1-003-80077-4.
- Ohana, David (2017). Nationalizing Judaism: Zionism as a Theological Ideology. Bloomsbury Publishing. ISBN 978-1-4985-4361-3.
- Reinharz, Shulamit (1999). Jewish Women and Women's Issues in the Yishuv (Palestine) and Israel: A Timeline of People, Places and Ideas, 1880-1998 (Report). Hadassah International Research Institute on Jewish Women at Brandeis University.
- Rosenberg, Chaim M. (2025). Children of the American Jewish Ghetto: Stories of Struggle and Achievement from 1881 through World War I. McFarland. ISBN 978-1-4766-9547-1.
- Segev, Zohar (2021). Immigration, Ideology, and Public Activity from an American Jewish Perspective: A Journey across Three Continents. Translated by Watzman, Haim. Brill. ISBN 978-90-04-46693-7.
- Shapira, Anita (2014). Ben-Gurion: Father of Modern Israel. Yale University Press. ISBN 978-0-300-18273-6.
- Shoup, Kate (2018). "David Ben-Gurion, "Father of the Nation"". The Israel-Palestine Border Conflict. Cavendish Square Publishing. pp. 44–45. ISBN 978-1-5026-3573-0.
- Steinberg, Bernard (1986). "Education, Judaism and Politics in Israel: A Survey". Jewish Social Studies. 48 (3/4): 235–256. JSTOR 4467339.
- Tarant, Zbyněk (2018). "From Munich to London-Responses to the Czechoslovak Crisis of 1938-1939 in the Press of the Yishuv in Palestine" (PDF). Hilufim. 24: 71–99.
- Vinitzky-Seroussi, Vered; Dekel, Irit (2019). "Moving gender: Home museums and the construction of their inhabitants". European Journal of Women's Studies. 26 (3): 274–292. doi:10.1177/1350506819856648.
- Weitz, Yechiam (2001). "To fantasy and back: David Ben-Gurion's first resignation, 1953". Israel Affairs. 8 (1–2): 59–78. doi:10.1080/13537120208719630.
- Weitz, Yechiam; Weitz, Yehiam (2005). "The Road to the 'Upheaval': A Capsule History of the Herut Movement, 1948-1977". Israel Studies. 10 (3): 54–86. doi:10.2979/ISR.2005.10.3.54. JSTOR 30245767.
- Zameret, Zvi; Tlamim, Moshe (1999). "Judaism in Israel: Ben-Gurion's Private Beliefs and Public Policy". Israel Studies. 4 (2): 64–89. doi:10.2979/ISR.1999.4.2.64. JSTOR 30245511.
