= Ex.co =

EX.CO
- Formerly: Playbuzz
- Founded: 2012
- Founders: Tom Pachys, Shachar Orren
- Headquarters: New York City
- Key people: Tom Pachys, CEO; Shachar Orren, CMO/CRO; Yaniv Lubinski, CFO; Oren Regev, COO
- Website: ex.co

EX.CO is a Disney-backed, machine learning-driven video platform that helps media companies grow revenue across multiple media platforms. It is used by publishers and media owners such as Advance Local, Hearst Newspapers, The Arena Group, PlayWorks, and Ziff Davis to monetize video content across screens.

== History ==
EX.CO was originally founded as Playbuzz in 2012 by Shaul Olmert and Tom Pachys. Pachys is a graduate of IDC as well as the co-founder of Whimado.

In its early years, Playbuzz raised several funding rounds, including a $3 million Series A from Carmel Ventures and a $35 million Series C in 2017 led by Viola Group with participation from existing investors including the Walt Disney Company and Saban Ventures.

In 2019, Shaul Olmert stepped down as CEO, with co-founder Tom Pachys assuming the role. Olmert eventually departed the company entirely. Playbuzz then changed its name to EX.CO and Shachar Orren was later named a co-founder of the company in 2021.

== Acquisitions ==
In 2021, EX.CO acquired video monetization technology company Cedato.

In 2022, the company announced the acquisition of the machine-learning company Bibblio.

== Awards ==
- 2022 Business Insider: Hottest Marketing Tech Companies of 2022
- 2023 Digiday Video & TV Awards: Best Digital Video Monetization Program
- 2024 Digiday Media Awards: Best Video Platform
- 2024 Digiday Technology Awards: Best Sell-Side Programmatic Platform
- 2025 Inc. Magazine's Best Workplaces List, recognizing culture and employee engagement
- 2025 Digiday Technology Awards: Best Sell-Side Programmatic Platform
- 2026 Convergent TV Awards: Ad Tech Innovation of the Year
- 2026 The Webby Awards: AI Features & Innovation - Best Product or Service Honoree

== See also ==
- Website monetization
- Content monetization
- Online advertising
- Online video
- Web performance
- Audience measurement
- Customer engagement
- Vertical video
- Machine learning
