= Aliza Olmert =

Israeli artist, photographer, author, and social worker

- עליזה אולמרט
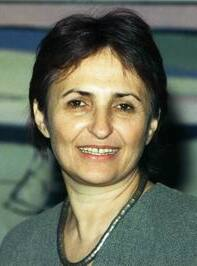
- Alisa Olmert, 1994

Spouse of the Prime Minister of Israel
- In role 14 April 2006 – 31 March 2009
- Prime Minister: Ehud Olmert
- Preceded by: Nava Barak-Singer (2001)
- Succeeded by: Sara Netanyahu

Personal details
- Born: Aliza Richter; 1946 (age 79–80) Eschwege, Germany
- Spouse: Ehud Olmert (m. 1970)
- Children: 4, including Dana and Shaul
- Education: Hebrew University of Jerusalem; Bezalel Academy of Art and Design
- Occupation: Artist, social worker

Aliza Olmert (Hebrew: עליזה אולמרט; née Richter; born 1946) is an Israeli artist, photographer, author, and social worker. She is married to former Israeli prime minister Ehud Olmert.

== Biography ==
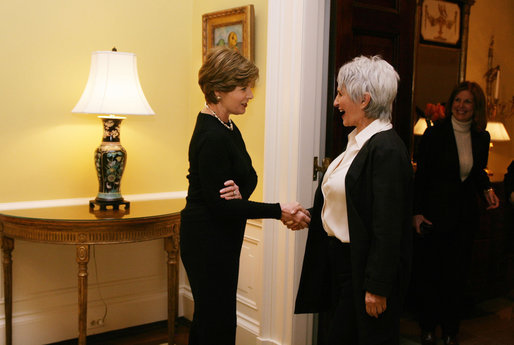
Laura Bush welcomes Aliza Olmert, 2006

Aliza Olmert was born in a displaced persons camp in Eschwege, Germany. Her parents were Holocaust survivors from Łódź, Poland. She immigrated to Israel with her family in 1949, grew up in Ramat Gan, and served as an instructor in the Israel Defense Forces. She met her husband, Ehud Olmert, at the Hebrew University of Jerusalem, where she was studying social work. The Olmerts live in Jerusalem's Katamon neighborhood. They have five children (including Dana and Shaul Olmert), one of them adopted.

=== Art career ===
In 1985–1988, at the age of 40, Olmert studied environmental design at the Bezalel Academy of Art and Design. In Israel, Olmert has exhibited at the Museum on the Seam in Jerusalem, the Museum of Israeli Art in Ramat Gan, the Eretz Israel Museum in Tel Aviv and the Tel Aviv Artists' House. Her work has also been exhibited in Japan, Uruguay, Italy, Britain, Poland, Argentina and New York. In March 2008, she was awarded the Steiger Prize in Germany.

=== Politics ===
Olmert's politics are left-wing, and she, their children and her social circle have been accused of influencing her husband's political views. She is said to support Meretz.

Olmert dislikes the political limelight, and says that their most difficult period as a couple was 1993–2003, when Ehud was mayor of Jerusalem.

=== Social welfare ===
Olmert is active in social programs promoting child welfare. She is the chairman of Or Shalom and Tlalim, which aid children at risk and families with homebound sick children. Olmert is also a member of the Action Committee for Children of Foreign Workers and President of the Board of Unitaf, a community-based organization that creates early-childhood programs for refugee and stateless children living in Israel.

== Published works ==
- Wall Language (co-authored with Gayil Hareven)
- Fantasy for Piano (a play performed by the Cameri Theater)
