= Nava Barak-Singer =

Israeli educator and social activist

- נאוה ברק-זינגר
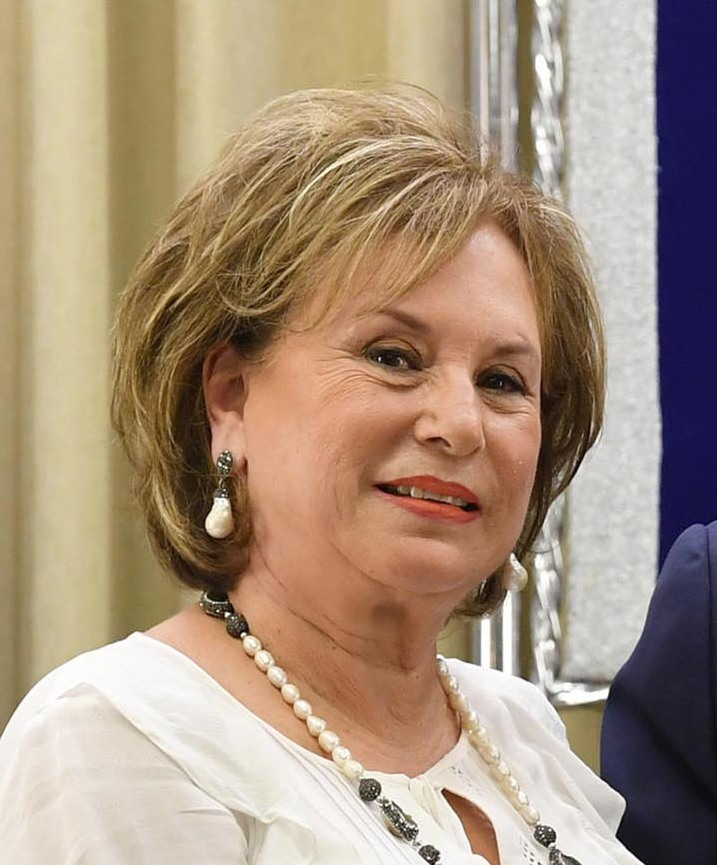
- Nava Barak-Singer, 2018

Spouse of the Prime Minister of Israel
- In role 6 July 1999 – 7 March 2001
- Prime Minister: Ehud Barak
- Preceded by: Sara Netanyahu
- Succeeded by: Aliza Olmert (2006)

Personal details
- Born: Nava Cohen; 8 April 1947 (age 79) Tiberias, Israel
- Spouse: Ehud Barak (m. 1969; div. 2003) Shalom Singer (m. 2009)
- Children: 3
- Education: Hebrew University of Jerusalem
- Occupation: English teacher

Nava Barak-Singer (Hebrew: נאוה ברק-זינגר; née Cohen; 8 April 1947) is an Israeli educator and social activist. She was the wife of Ehud Barak between 1969 and 2003 and thus the spouse of the prime minister of Israel between 1999 and 2001.

== Biography ==
Nava Cohen was born in Tiberias. Her father was the manager of a branch of Bank Leumi and her mother worked for the Jewish Agency. She served in the Israel Defense Forces as a member of the Intelligence Corps.

In the winter of 1968, while studying English and Arabic literature at the Hebrew University, she met her future husband, Ehud Brug, later Barak, in one of the university's libraries; Brug, a major in the IDF, was a student of mathematics and physics. After graduating with a BA, she obtained a position as an English teacher at a middle school in Kfar Saba.

The wedding of Nava Cohen and Ehud Barak took place on March 25, 1969, at the Ginaton Hotel in Tiberias. The newlyweds made their first home in Kiryat Hayovel in Jerusalem.

== Spouse of the prime minister of Israel ==
During Ehud Barak's time as Israeli Prime Minister (1999–2001), Nava Barak chose not to hold any official public role, instead undertaking voluntary work in the youth sector. The organizations in which she served included the Elem Association for Youth at Risk; the network of Hafuch al Hafuch cafes that gave young people opportunities to meet professionals; a project supporting the teaching of healthy interpersonal relationships in schools; and the Supervision Patrol Project, which aimed to identify young people whose behaviour on the streets gave cause for concern. Other organizations that she helped were the Israel Cancer Association, the Israel AIDS Task force, the Tel Hashomer Hospital, the Rabin Medical Center and the Association for Children with Down Syndrome. Following an attack on a children's bus in Kfar Darom, she raised money for a fund that had been created to help the injured.

== Private life ==
The Baraks had three daughters. In 2003, after 34 years of marriage, they separated. On July 7, 2009, Nava Barak married the businessman Shalom Singer.

Barak-Singer is currently employed as the president of the Elem Association and serves as the (unpaid) president of the Friends of the Rabin Medical Center Association.
