= Spouse of the prime minister of Israel =

- בת הזוג של ראש ממשלת ישראל

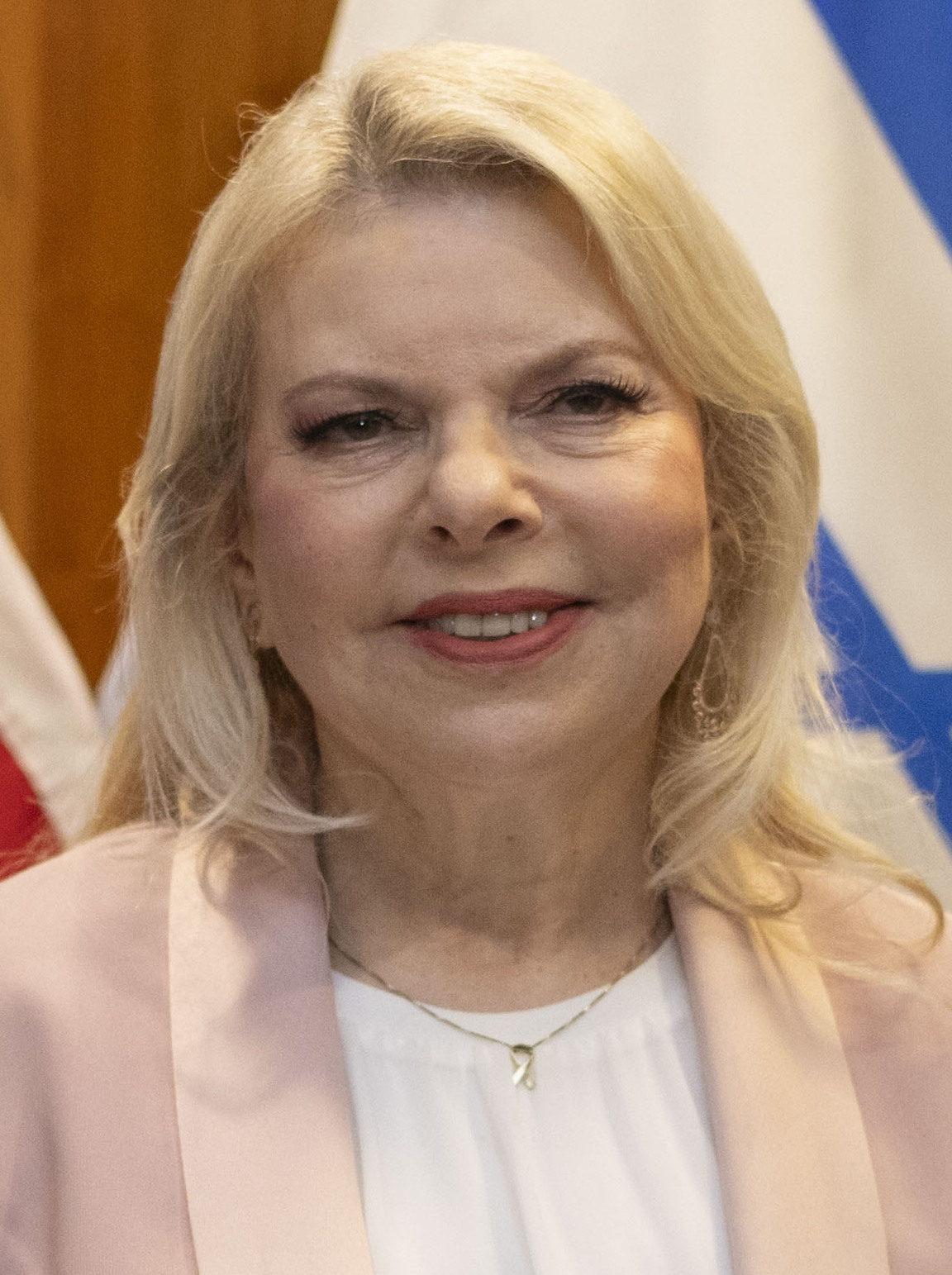
- Incumbent; Sara Netanyahu since December 29, 2022
- Residence: Beit Aghion
- Inaugural holder: Paula Ben-Gurion
- Formation: May 17, 1948

The spouse of the prime minister of Israel (Note: Hebrew: בן הזוג של ראש ממשלת ישראל, Arabic: زوجة رئيس وزراء إسرائيل) refers to the wife or husband of the head of government of Israel. It is not an official position or title.

== History ==
The spouse of Israel's prime minister assists him with ceremonial duties and performs various other functions. The wife of the current prime minister, Benjamin Netanyahu, is Sara Netanyahu.

| Name | Portrait | Term began | Term ended | Prime Minister of Israel | Notes |
|---|---|---|---|---|---|
| Paula Ben-Gurion | | May 17, 1948 | January 26, 1954 | David Ben-Gurion | Wife of the first Prime Minister of Israel. Born in the Russian Empire and raised in the United States. |
| Tzippora Sharett | | January 26, 1954 | November 3, 1955 | Moshe Sharett | |
| Paula Ben-Gurion | | November 3, 1955 | June 26, 1963 | David Ben-Gurion | Paula Ben-Gurion's second tenure as the wife of the prime minister. |
| Position vacant | | June 26, 1963 | March 3, 1964 | Levi Eshkol | Levi Eshkol's second wife, Elisheva Kaplan, died in 1959 before he became Israel's prime minister. On 3 March 1964 he was the first and only prime minister to marry while in office. |
| Miriam Eshkol | | March 3, 1964 | February 26, 1969 | Levi Eshkol | Miriam Eshkol maintained her job as the Knesset librarian, in addition to her roles as the wife of the prime minister. After her husband's death in office in 1969, she founded Yad Levi Eshkol in 1970 and served as its chair until 2010. |
| Ruth Allon | | February 26, 1969 | March 17, 1969 | Yigal Allon | Her husband served as acting prime minister after Levi Eshkol died in office. |
| Position vacant | | March 17, 1969 | June 3, 1974 | Golda Meir | Golda Meir, Israel's only female prime minister to date, was a widow. Her husband, Morris Meyerson, died in 1951 before she became Israel's prime minister. |
| Leah Rabin | | June 3, 1974 | June 20, 1977 | Yitzhak Rabin | First tenure as the wife of the prime minister. |
| Aliza Begin | | June 20, 1977 | November 13, 1982 | Menachem Begin | Aliza (née Arnold) Begin died in November 1982 while her husband was still prime minister. The couple had been married since May 29, 1939. |
| Position vacant | | November 13, 1982 | October 10, 1983 | Menachem Begin | Following the death of Aliza in November 1982, Prime Minister Menachem Begin gradually withdrew from public life until his resignation in October 1983. |
| Shulamit Shamir | | October 10, 1983 | September 13, 1984 | Yitzhak Shamir | Shamir, who was born in Bulgaria, was a social activist. This marked her first tenure as the wife of the prime minister. |
| Sonia Peres | | September 13, 1984 | October 20, 1986 | Shimon Peres | |
| Shulamit Shamir | | October 20, 1986 | July 13, 1992 | Yitzhak Shamir | |
| Leah Rabin | | July 13, 1992 | November 4, 1995 | Yitzhak Rabin | Leah Rabin's second tenure as the wife of Prime Minister Yitzhak Rabin. Her husband was assassinated on November 4, 1995. |
| Sonia Peres | | November 4, 1995 | June 18, 1996 | Shimon Peres | |
| Sara Netanyahu | | June 18, 1996 | July 6, 1999 | Benjamin Netanyahu | Netanyahu's first tenure as the wife of the prime minister |
| Nava Barak | | July 6, 1999 | March 7, 2001 | Ehud Barak | |
| Position vacant | | March 7, 2001 | January 4, 2006 | Ariel Sharon | Ariel Sharon's second wife, Lily Sharon, died in March 2000 before he became prime minister. |
| Aliza Olmert | | January 4, 2006 | March 31, 2009 | Ehud Olmert | Alisa Olmert is an artist, photographer, author and social worker born in Germany to Holocaust survivors from Poland. |
| Sara Netanyahu | | March 31, 2009 | June 13, 2021 | Benjamin Netanyahu | Netanyahu's second tenure as the wife of the prime minister |
| Gilat Bennett | | June 13, 2021 | July 1, 2022 | Naftali Bennett | Bennett rarely appeared in public. She was seen next to her husband a few times and spoke twice in the Knesset. |
| Lihi Lapid | | July 1, 2022 | December 29, 2022 | Yair Lapid | |
| Sara Netanyahu | | December 29, 2022 | Present | Benjamin Netanyahu | Netanyahu's third tenure as the wife of the prime minister |

== Use of the title "First Lady" by the prime minister's spouse ==
In 2018, then–prime ministerial spouse Sara Netanyahu was introduced as "First Lady" when receiving US vice president Mike Pence, causing controversy. The chief of protocol in the Israeli Foreign Ministry stated that this was a decision by the Prime Minister's Office, and noted that the title "First Lady" was not adopted by the Ministerial Committee for Symbols and Ceremonies, while implying that the title would be inappropriate for the Prime Minister's spouse were it to be adopted.

== See also ==
- First Lady of Israel
