= Lihi Lapid =

Israeli author and journalist (born 1968)

- ליהיא לפיד
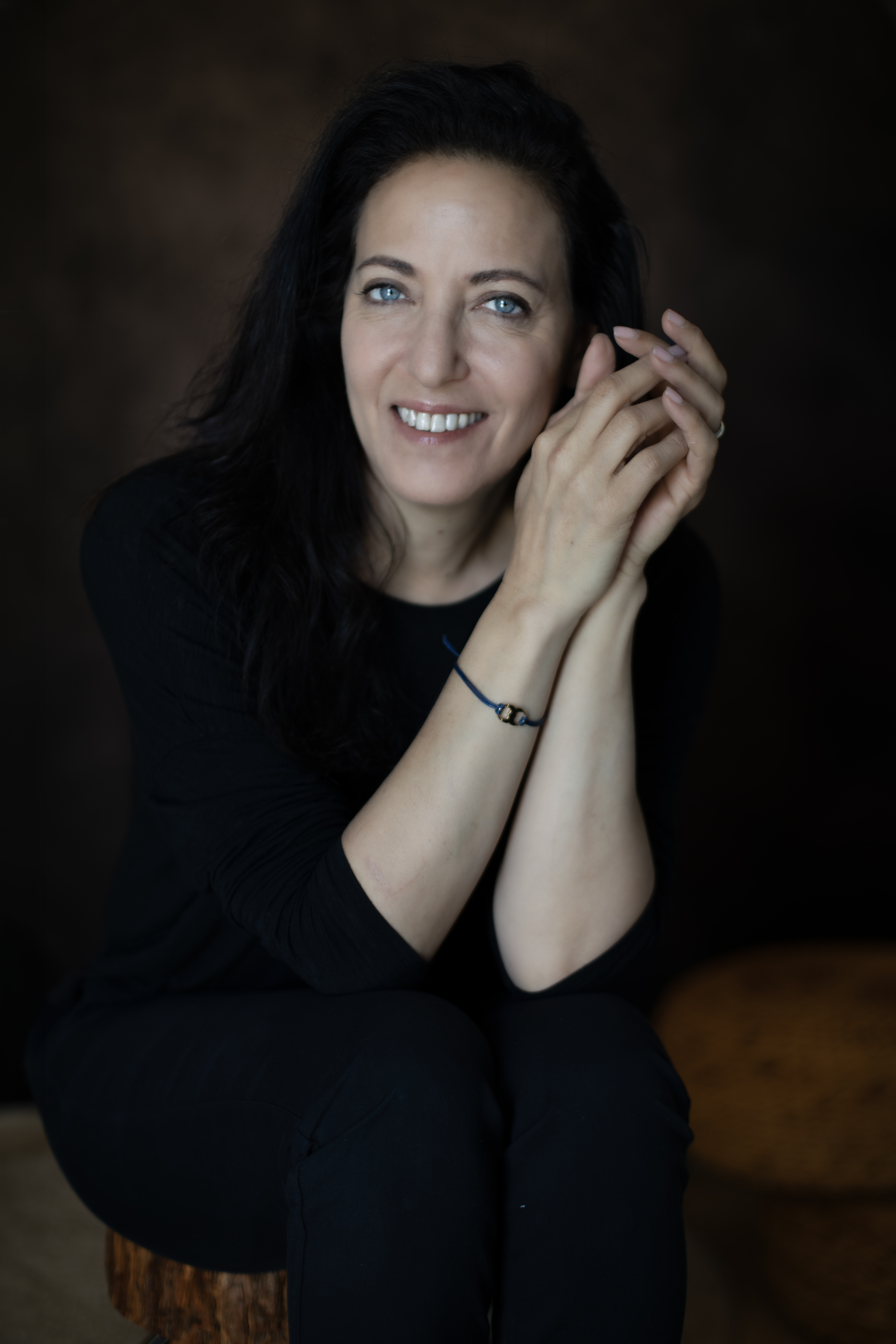
- Lapid in 2022

Spouse of the Prime Minister of Israel
- In role 1 July 2022 – 29 December 2022
- Prime Minister: Yair Lapid
- Preceded by: Gilat Bennett
- Succeeded by: Sara Netanyahu

Personal details
- Born: 12 May 1968 (age 58) Arad, Israel
- Spouse: Yair Lapid
- Children: 2
- Education: Camera Obscura School of Art; Tel Aviv University
- Occupation: Author, photojournalist, columnist
- Website: lihilapid.com

Lihi Lapid (Hebrew: ליהיא לפיד; born 12 May 1968) is an Israeli author, photojournalist, and newspaper columnist. She is an activist for people with disabilities. Her husband is Yair Lapid, the former Prime Minister of Israel.

== Biography ==
Lihi Mann (ליהיא מן) was born and raised in Arad, Israel. Her family is of Ashkenazi Jewish descent who hails from Poland, Germany, and Austria. She attended Thelma Yellin High School of Arts, the Camera Obscura School of Art and Tel Aviv University. During her service in the Israel Defense Forces, Lapid was a photographer for Bamahane. Lapid met her future spouse, Yair Lapid, while she was in the Israeli military. They have a son and daughter and reside in Ramat Aviv Gimel, Tel Aviv, Israel.

== Journalism and literary career ==
She was a columnist at Yedioth Ahronoth for 15 years. In April 2019, after taking time off to campaign for her spouse, the newspaper would not hire her back. In 2008, she authored a novel and memoir titled Women of Valor.

Lapid is a feminist and an advocate for people with disabilities. She has an autistic daughter. Lapid is president of SHEKEL, a community organization for people with special needs.

== Published works ==
- Lapid, Lihi; Tovia, Miriam; Muzeʼon le-omanut Yiśreʼelit, Ramat Gan (1994). ha-Ḳesharim. Ramat Gan: Muzeʼon le-omanut Yiśreʼelit. OCLC 34447094.
- The Magic Whisper (2006), ASIN B00IMJNF4Y
- Lihi, Lapid (2013). Woman of Valor. Gefen. ISBN 978-965-229-640-5. OCLC 857371638.
- Lihiyot Ima Shel Hayal (2018), Yediot Books, ISBN 978-965-564-428-9
- On Her Own, 2024, Harper Collins, ISBN 978-0-06-330976-0
- I Wanted to Be Wonderful: A Novel (2025), ISBN 979-8992427660, Zibby Publishing
