= Leah Rabin =

Wife of Yitzhak Rabin (1928–2000)

- לאה רבין
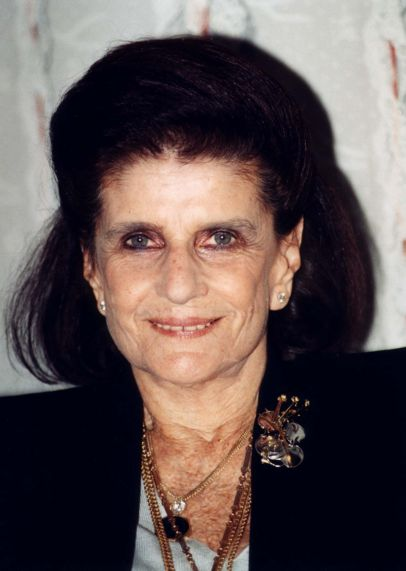
- Leah Rabin in 1999

Spouse of the Prime Minister of Israel
- In role 13 July 1992 – 4 November 1995
- Prime Minister: Yitzhak Rabin
- Preceded by: Shulamit Shamir
- Succeeded by: Sonia Peres
- In role 3 June 1974 – 20 June 1977
- Prime Minister: Yitzhak Rabin
- Preceded by: Miriam Eshkol (1969)
- Succeeded by: Aliza Begin

Personal details
- Born: Leah Schloßberg; 8 April 1928 Königsberg, East Prussia, Germany (now Kaliningrad, Russia)
- Died: 12 November 2000 (aged 72) Petah Tikva, Israel
- Spouse: Yitzhak Rabin (m. 1948; died 1995)
- Children: Dalia and Yuval
- Occupation: Teacher

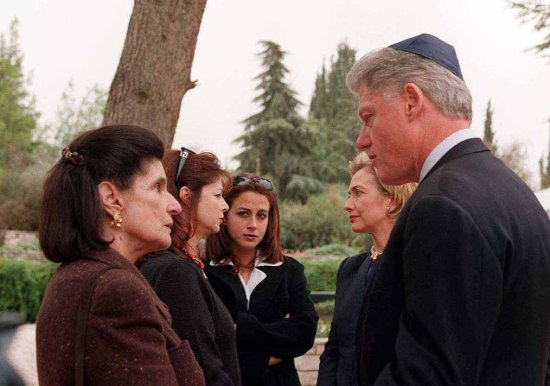
Leah Rabin and her family meet with Bill and Hillary Clinton, 1998

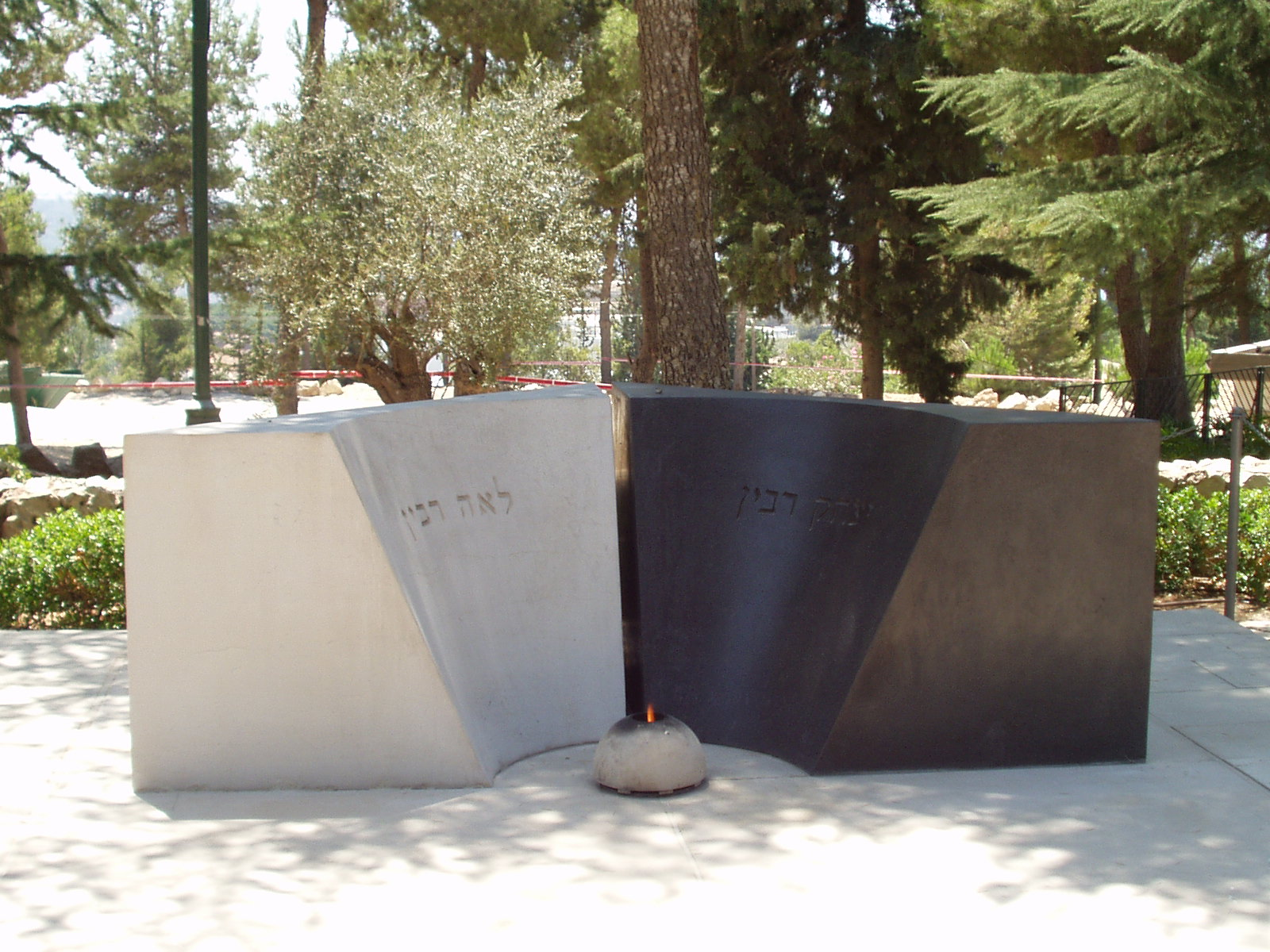
Yitzhak and Leah Rabin's grave on Mount Herzl

Leah Rabin (Hebrew: לאה רבין, née Schloßberg; 8 April 1928 – 12 November 2000) was the wife of Israeli Prime Minister Yitzhak Rabin, who was assassinated in 1995.

== Biography ==
Leah Rabin was born Leah Schloßberg in Königsberg, East Prussia, Germany (now Kaliningrad, Russia), to an upper-middle-class family of Russian-born parents. Immediately after Adolf Hitler's election as Chancellor of Germany in 1933, Schloßberg emigrated with her family to Mandate Palestine. Her father had bought a piece of property near Binyamina on his first trip to the area in 1927. She met her future husband, Yitzhak Rabin, at school. They married in 1948, the year the State of Israel was established.

Her husband became Prime Minister in 1974 following Golda Meir's resignation. In 1975, Leah Rabin attended to the World Conference on Women as the head of Israel's representation. Princess Ashraf Pahlavi, twin sister of Iran's Shah, Imelda Marcos, wife of Philippines' president; Minister Barbara Castle, Secretary of State for Health and Social Services of Great Britain; Jehan Sadat, wife Egyptian president Anwar Sadat. So many delegations were headed by politicians that the Conference became an arena of international disputes instead of a forum about humanitarianism, social or educative issues.

When Rabin reached the podium "35 delegations abandoned the room" with hundreds of delegates from Africa, Asia, Latin America, and the Soviet bloc. Rabin had to wait for the "exodus to finish" to begin speaking. The violence against Israel made them fear that the Arab countries and other Non-Aligned Movement countries delegations questioned the credentials of Israel to participate in the Conference. Finally, the challenge turned to be only a rumor, but the Declaration of Mexico draft of 30 June already included a call to eliminate Zionism.

Later, the UN General Assembly adopted, by the impulse of Arab countries, the Soviet bloc and the Non-Aligned Movement, the 3379 resolution, which considered Zionism as racism and compared it with South Africa's Apartheid. The conformation of that group of countries followed the logic of Cold War confrontations. The bloc voting produced a majority in the UN that passed multiple resolutions criticizing Israel, including Resolutions 3089, 3236, and 32/40.

Three years after Yitzhak Rabin's appointment, in 1977, a US bank account (illegal at that time in Israel) held by Leah was exposed by Haaretz journalist Dan Margalit. As a result, her husband decided to take responsibility, resigned from office. This came to be known as the Dollar Account affair.

Rabin supported the peace efforts of her husband in the Israeli–Palestinian conflict and worked further for a solution after his assassination. She wrote a book about her memories of her husband, which was released in 1997, under the name Rabin: Our Life, His Legacy.

She supported Shimon Peres in the elections of 1996, calling people to vote for him so that her husband's death "would not be in vain." She also expressed her disappointment after he lost the elections to Benjamin Netanyahu. In the election of 1999 she supported Ehud Barak. However, during Barak's term as prime minister she changed her opinions about him.

== Death ==
Leah Rabin was diagnosed with lung cancer and died in Rabin Medical Center in Petah Tikva in 2000 at the age of 72 and was buried in Mount Herzl in Jerusalem beside her husband Yitzhak Rabin, a few days after the fifth anniversary of her husband's assassination.

== Family ==
The Rabins' daughter Dalia was later a Knesset member for the Centre Party, New Way and the Labour Party, serving as Deputy Minister of Defense.
