= Gilat Bennett =

Israeli chef (born 1977)

- גילת בנט
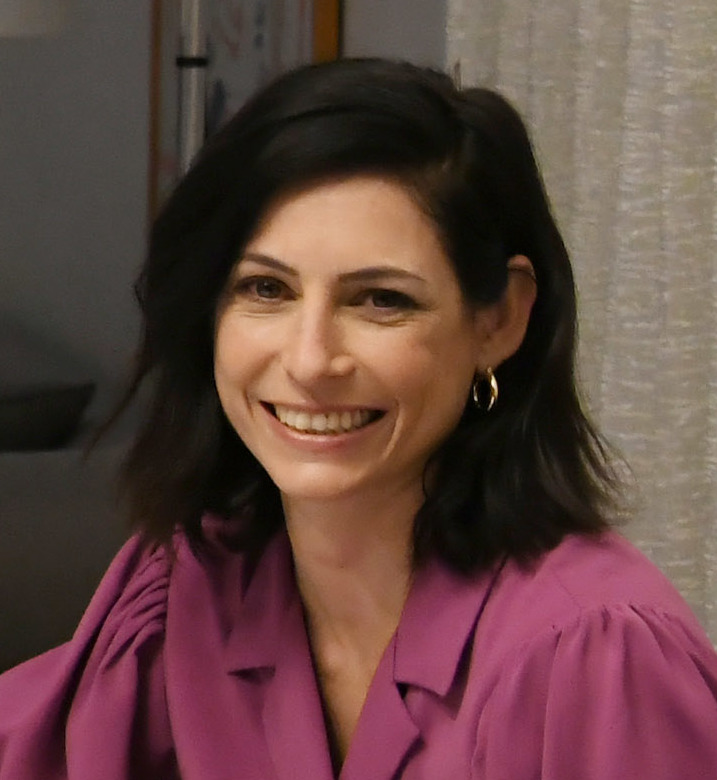
- Bennett in 2021

Spouse of the Prime Minister of Israel
- In role 13 June 2021 – 30 June 2022
- Prime Minister: Naftali Bennett
- Preceded by: Sara Netanyahu
- Succeeded by: Lihi Lapid

Personal details
- Born: Gilat Ethel Einav; 12 May 1977 (age 49) Ramat HaSharon, Israel
- Party: Bennett 2026 (2025–present)
- Spouse: Naftali Bennett (m. 1999)
- Children: 4
- Education: International Culinary Center; Adler Institute
- Occupation: Pastry chef; parent counselor

Gilat Ethel Bennett (Note: Hebrew: גילת אתל בנט, romanized: Gilat Etal Benṭ) (née Einav; (Note: Hebrew: עינב, romanized: Inav) born 12 May 1977) is an Israeli pastry chef, parent counselor, and the wife of Naftali Bennett, who served as the prime minister of Israel from 2021 to 2022.

== Biography ==
Gilat Einav was born in Ramat HaSharon to Moshe and Bracha, and grew up in Kfar Uria as a secular Jew. She attended the Jerusalem Academy of Music and Dance in Jerusalem, where she focused on ballet studies. She served in the IDF as an education officer in the Paratroopers Brigade, where she met Naftali Bennett, then a reserve officer in the Maglan special forces unit, whom she invited to lecture her soldiers. After her release from the army, she studied confectionery, and worked in the profession.

Gilat married Naftali in 1999 when he was a law student at the Hebrew University. The couple moved to Jerusalem, and then Beit Aryeh. With the rise of the start-up company Cyota that was run by Naftali, the couple moved to New York. In New York, Gilat studied at the International Culinary Center, and worked as a dessert chef at several restaurants. She then began living a religious lifestyle, following her husband.

After four years in New York, the couple returned to Israel. Bennett opened an ice cream factory in Kfar Saba, called Gilati, and sold it following the birth of their eldest son. Subsequently, she was certified at the Adler Institute as a parent counselor and sleep consultant, which are her current occupations.

The Bennett family lives in Ra'anana with their four children. Their eldest son, Yonatan, is named after Yonatan Netanyahu, and their youngest son, David Emmanuel, is named after Emmanuel Moreno, who served alongside Naftali Bennett in the special forces.

== Spouse of the Prime Minister of Israel ==
In November 2021, Gilat Bennett made her debut as the Prime Minister's wife at an event marking the International Day for the Prevention of Violence against Women, which was held at the Knesset. In her speech, she emphasized the need for early prevention of cases.

In December 2021, Bennett caused a stir when she went on vacation abroad with her children, contrary to her husband's recommendation to the Israeli public not to fly abroad unnecessarily to prevent the penetration of the Omicron virus into Israel.

In February 2022, she made an address at the International Women's Day ceremony in the Knesset, and spoke about her self-fulfillment as a woman with a career and children.
