= Shulamit Shamir =

Israeli militant, disability rights advocate, and wife of Yitzhak Shamir

- שולמית שמיר
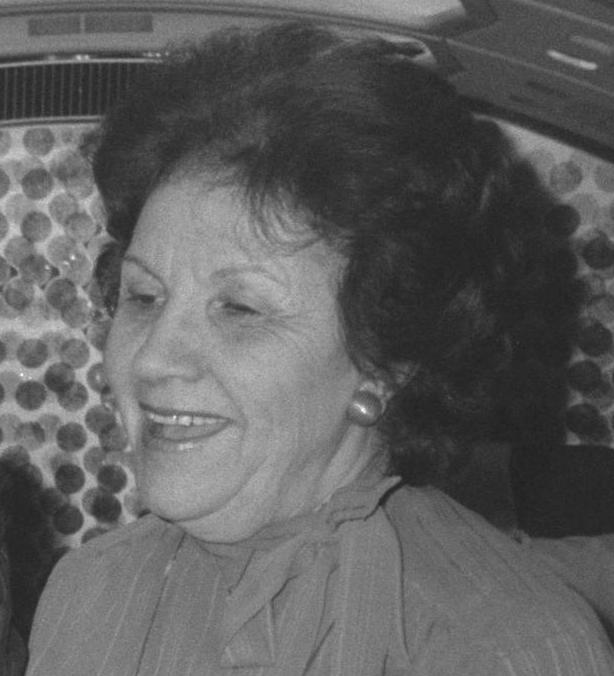
- Shulamit Shamir, 1983

Spouse of the Prime Minister of Israel
- In role 20 October 1986 – 13 July 1992
- Prime Minister: Yitzhak Shamir
- Preceded by: Sonia Peres
- Succeeded by: Leah Rabin
- In role 10 October 1983 – 13 September 1984
- Prime Minister: Yitzhak Shamir
- Preceded by: Aliza Begin
- Succeeded by: Sonia Peres

Personal details
- Born: Sara Levy; 19 April 1923 Sofia, Kingdom of Bulgaria
- Died: 29 July 2011 (aged 88) Tel Aviv, Israel
- Spouse: Yitzhak Shamir (m. 1944)
- Children: 2, including Yair

Sarah Shulamit Shamir (Hebrew: שרה שולמית שמיר; née Levy; 19 April 1923 – 29 July 2011) was the wife of the seventh Prime Minister of Israel, Yitzhak Shamir. Shulamit was active in various voluntary organizations and was the founder of the Public Council for the Elderly.

== Biography ==
Shamir was born in 1923 in Sofia in Bulgaria as Sara (Sarika) Levy. In her youth she joined the Betar youth movement. In 1941, she immigrated to Mandatory Palestine on board the ship "Darian 2" and was arrested by the British Mandate authorities for being an illegal immigrant. She spent six months in the Mizraa detention camp near Acre, where she met Yitzhak Shamir, and another six months arrest in Atlit detainee camp. She joined the Lehi Jewish militant underground, and served as liaison for Yitzhak Shamir, the organization's commander. In Lehi she received the underground nickname "Shulamit" which became her first name. In 1944 Shulamit and Yitzhak married and in 1945 their son Yair was born. A year later, Yitzhak was captured and exiled by the British Mandate's authorities to Eritrea. While her husband was in exile, Shulamit was arrested. The next day, Haaretz newspaper reported on the arrest of "the important terrorist that the police have been looking for for years." During her imprisonment in the women's prison in Bethlehem, she went on hunger strike for 11 days demanding to be reunited with her toddler son. During the hunger strike she was taken to a hospital where doctors tried to force-feed her. In May 1948 she was released.

When Yitzhak Shamir served in several political positions, Shulamit Shamir held a number of public positions in various associations and organizations. When Yitzhak Shamir served as Speaker of the Knesset, Shamir volunteered to work with bereaved families after the Yom Kippur War and later in Akim, helping to establish a village for the intellectually disabled. During Yitzhak Shamir's tenure as prime minister, the "Public Council for the Elderly" was established on Shulamit Shamir's initiative. Shulamit Shamir was appointed chairman of the council. Shulamit Shamir's activity reached pinnacle in the efforts on the Senior Citizens Law enacted in 1989.

In 1988, the minister of foreign affairs of Bulgaria invited her to visit, at a time when Israel and Bulgaria did not have diplomatic relations. After some time she was invited for another visit there to participate in an international symposium on the rescue of Bulgarian Jews during the Holocaust. During the visit, she met with the President of Bulgaria. In 1991, she went on another visit there, this time as an official visit with her husband, Prime Minister Shamir, in which she received a letter of appreciation from the Bulgarian government for her contribution to the renewal of Bulgaria-Israel relations.

Shulamit Shamir was criticized for her political involvement, including in the Israel Broadcasting Authority, over which Yitzhak Shamir was in charge. It was alleged that she acted for the appointment of Yosef Barel as CEO of the IBA and that she was behind the ending of the TV show Ze ha'zman due to the political statements of presenter Ram Evron. In an interview in 2001, she denied the allegations.

Shulamit and Yitzhak Shamir have a son and a daughter: Yair Shamir, a businessman and former Knesset member, and Gilada Diamant, who holds a senior position in the Ministry of Defense.

In the last years of her life, she lived in a nursing home in Tel Aviv, while Yitzhak Shamir was hospitalized in a nursing home in Herzliya.

On July 29, 2011, Shulamit Shamir died of a stroke at the age of 88. She was buried in The Helkat Gedolei HaUma on Mount Herzl, Yitzhak Shamir was buried next to her after his death.
