= Shmuel Ben-Artzi =

Israeli writer

- שמואל בן ארצי
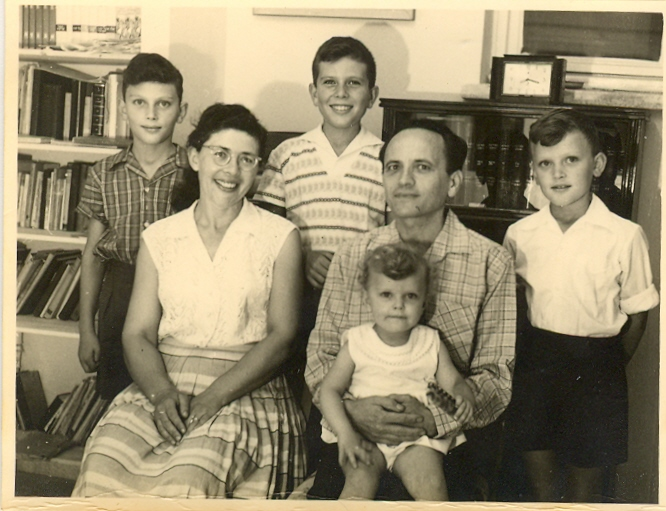
- Shmuel Ben-Artzi with his family in 1960.
- Born: Samuel Han; 31 December 1914; Biłgoraj, Congress Poland, Russian Empire
- Died: 9 November 2011 (aged 96); Jerusalem
- Occupations: Writer, poet, educator
- Spouse: Chava Paritzky
- Children: 4, including Sara

Shmuel Ben-Artzi (Hebrew: שמואל בן ארצי; December 31, 1914 – November 9, 2011) was a Polish-born Israeli writer, poet and educator. Ben-Artzi was also the father in-law of Israeli prime minister Benjamin Netanyahu.

== Life and work ==
Ben-Artzi was born Samuel Han on December 31, 1914, in Biłgoraj, Congress Poland, Russian Empire. Growing up Ben-Artzi studied in a cheder and in a branch of the Novardok yeshiva in Mezhirichi. Later on in his life Ben-Artzi immortalized the world of the Novardok yeshiva in three of his books.

He moved to Mandate Palestine in 1933 and began studying at the Beit Yosef yeshiva in Bnei Brak which was headed by Rabbi Yaakov Yisrael Kanievsky. After about a year he left the yeshiva and went to work as a farmer in groves of Bnei Brak and as an agricultural administrator in Netanya. In 1945 he served in the Irgun underground military group, and afterwards, from 1946 until 1948 he served in the Jewish paramilitary organization Haganah, which soon afterwards became the core of the Israel Defense Forces.

During the next several decades Ben-Artzi worked as a teacher, raised a family and earning a bachelor's and a master's degree in Bible, literature and Hebrew language from the University of Haifa. In addition, through the years Ben-Artzi also published several books, including poetry books, children's books and a novel.

Ben-Artzi began his career in teaching at 1946 in the school in Tiberias. In 1950 he began teaching at Kibbutz Mahanayim. After two years the family moved to Kfar Hittim. Afterwards the family moved to Kiryat Tiv'on. From 1967 Ben-Artzi began teaching in a seminar for teachers at Nahalal, and afterwards he also worked as the school principal of this seminar for a decade.

After many years in which he lived a secular lifestyle, during his last years Ben-Artzi returned to maintain a religious lifestyle.

During 2010, Ben-Artzi helped his 15-year-old grandson Avner Netanyahu, prepare for the International Bible Contest, which Avner won.

During the last months of his life, after his health deteriorated, Ben-Artzi was cared for by Sara Netanyahu at the prime minister's residence in Jerusalem.

== Death ==
Ben-Artzi died at the Hadassah Ein Kerem Medical Center in Jerusalem on November 9, 2011 at the age of 96.

== Writings ==
Ben-Artzi wrote 12 books, including "Your City Jerusalem: The City of David and the Consciousness of the Nation of Israel throughout the Generations", "Holidays in Israel: Old and New" and "The Amusing Bible: Three Comprehensive Bible Quizzes in One Volume". In 2000 he won the Ka-Tzetnik Book Prize.

== Personal life ==
Ben-Artzi married Chava (née Paritzky), sixth generation Jerusalemite and a descendant of the Vilna Gaon's students. The couple had four children:

- Matanya Ben-Artzi, professor of mathematics
- Hagai Ben-Artzi, professor of Talmud and Jewish Thought
- Amaziah Ben-Artzi, pilot and hi-tech entrepreneur
- Sarah Netanyahu, educational psychologist and the wife of the Israeli prime minister Benjamin Netanyahu
