= Shaul Olmert =

Israeli Entrepreneur

- שאול אולמרט
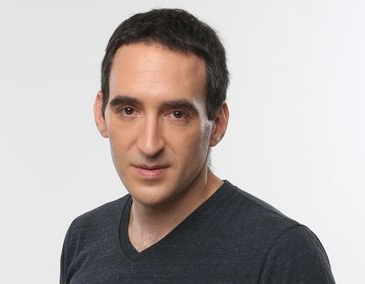
- Born: 1975 (age 50–51)
- Education: New York University
- Occupations: Entrepreneur; Business Executive
- Known for: Co-Founder, Playbuzz
- Parent(s): Ehud Olmert and Aliza Olmert
- Website: Shaul Olmert on LinkedIn

Shaul Olmert (Hebrew: שאול אולמרט; born 1975) is an Israeli entrepreneur and business executive. He is the co-founder and chief executive officer of Piggy (AKA: Flying Pigs LTD.), a stealth mode start up based in Tel Aviv, Israel. Prior to Piggy, he was the co-founder of Playbuzz, an online content publishing platform where he was chief executive officer for eight years before stepping down and assuming a new role as the company's president. He has been involved in numerous other startups including NetAlign, GameGround, and Sundaysky. Olmert also worked at Nickelodeon/MTV Networks and Conduit.

== Early life and education ==
Olmert grew up in Israel. As a child he liked to develop computer programs and build machines out of electrical circuits from old radio transistors and walkie-talkie type gadgets. His grandparents Bella and Mordechai Olmert came to Israel in 1933 after escaping from Odessa during the Russian Civil War in 1919. They traveled to China prior to settling in 1930s Israel. His father is former Israeli Prime Minister Ehud Olmert. He served in the Israeli Army. After his service, Olmert worked as a high school teacher in Jerusalem where he taught computers, prior to moving to New York to attend college. He went on to attend New York University where he earned a master's degree in Interactive Telecommunications.

== Career ==
Olmert began his business executive career as the director of business partnerships at Oberon Media prior to beginning his career for Nickelodeon/MTV Networks. Olmert worked as the vice president of digital products for MTV Networks, primarily with MTV Games. During his time with MTV he was in charge of adapting its television properties for the digital game industry. Olmert left MTV in 2007 and was president and chief marketing officer of SundaySky prior to joining Conduit as that company's chief marketing officer.

In 2008, Olmert co-founded GameGround, a social network for gamers that sends game updates such as high scores to members through a feed. It also provides tips and tricks for playing various video games.

In 2012, Olmert founded the online content publishing platform Playbuzz with Tom Pachys, launching the website in December 2013. The website allows users, digital publishers, and brands to generate content in formats generally associated with viral media, including lists, quizzes, polls, ranked lists, and trivia that can be shared via social media or embedded elsewhere on the web. By September 2014, seven of the 10 biggest stories on Facebook involved content that originated on Playbuzz. The company took over the number one spot as the most shared publisher on Facebook in November 2014 with approximately 9 million shares. It was also listed by Inc. as one of the 15 Israeli Startups Getting Hot at the Turn of 2015. In October 2019, he stepped down as CEO.

Since September 2020, he has been the co-founder and chief executive officer of Piggy (AKA: Flying Pigs LTD.), a stealth mode startup based in Tel Aviv, Israel.
