= Aliza Begin =

Wife of Israeli Prime Minister Menachem Begin (1920–1982)

- עליזה בגין
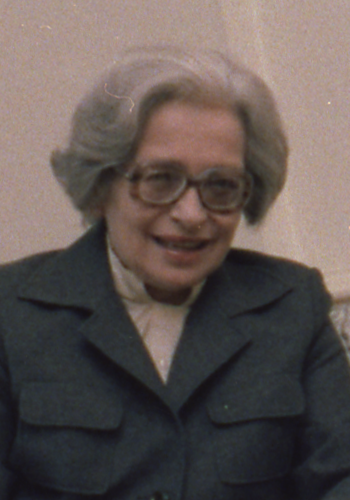
- Aliza Begin in 1977

Spouse of the Prime Minister of Israel
- In role 20 June 1977 – 13 November 1982
- Prime Minister: Menachem Begin
- Preceded by: Leah Rabin
- Succeeded by: Shulamit Shamir

Personal details
- Born: Aliza Arnold; 25 March 1920 Drohobycz, Second Polish Republic (present-day Ukraine)
- Died: 13 November 1982 (aged 62) Jerusalem, Israel
- Spouse: Menachem Begin (m. 1939)
- Children: 3, including Benny
- Education: Hebrew University of Jerusalem
- Occupation: archeology

Aliza Begin (Hebrew: עליזה בגין; née Arnold; 25 March 1920 – 13 November 1982) was the wife of Prime Minister of Israel, Menachem Begin.

== Early life ==
Aliza was born on March 25, 1920, to the wealthy Arnold family in Drohobycz, Poland (now Ukraine). Her father was a partner in the oil wells in Galicia. At the age of seven she studied Hebrew, from the age of 14 she was active in Betar, and in 1938 she graduated from high school.

== Marriage (1939) ==
On 29 May 1939, she married Menachem Begin, whom she met at the age of 17 at her father's house, who was a donor to the Revisionist party. The two married in the town of Drohobych, when Menachem Begin studied law in the nearby town. Ze'ev Jabotinsky was the best man at their wedding, which was attended by hundreds of Betar activists.

== Between marriage and the establishment of Israel (1939-1948) ==
Three months after the marriage, the Germans invaded Poland and the young couple fled Warsaw. After a march that lasted two weeks, they arrived in Vilnius, the free capital of Lithuania. In the summer of 1940, the Soviet army entered Vilnius and Begin was arrested for "Zionist activity." After the arrest of her husband, she immigrated to Mandatory Palestine following a difficult journey. She was arrested in Turkey and released with the intervention of Eliahu Eilat. Upon arriving in Mandatory Palestine, she was arrested by the British Mandate authorities and imprisoned for several weeks in the Atlit detainee camp. After her release, she enrolled in archeology studies at the Hebrew University of Jerusalem.

In May 1942, she reunited with her husband, when he joined the Polish Army and was stationed in Mandatory Palestine. Due to her husband Menachem Begin's underground activities in Irgun, Begin moved between hiding places and changed her name from time to time. At first she lived in the Hasiduf neighborhood near Petah Tikva under the name Halperin. She then lived on Yehoshua Ben Nun Street under the name Sassover. This name was recorded in the hospital when her first daughter, Hasia, was born.

== Spouse of the Prime Minister of Israel ==
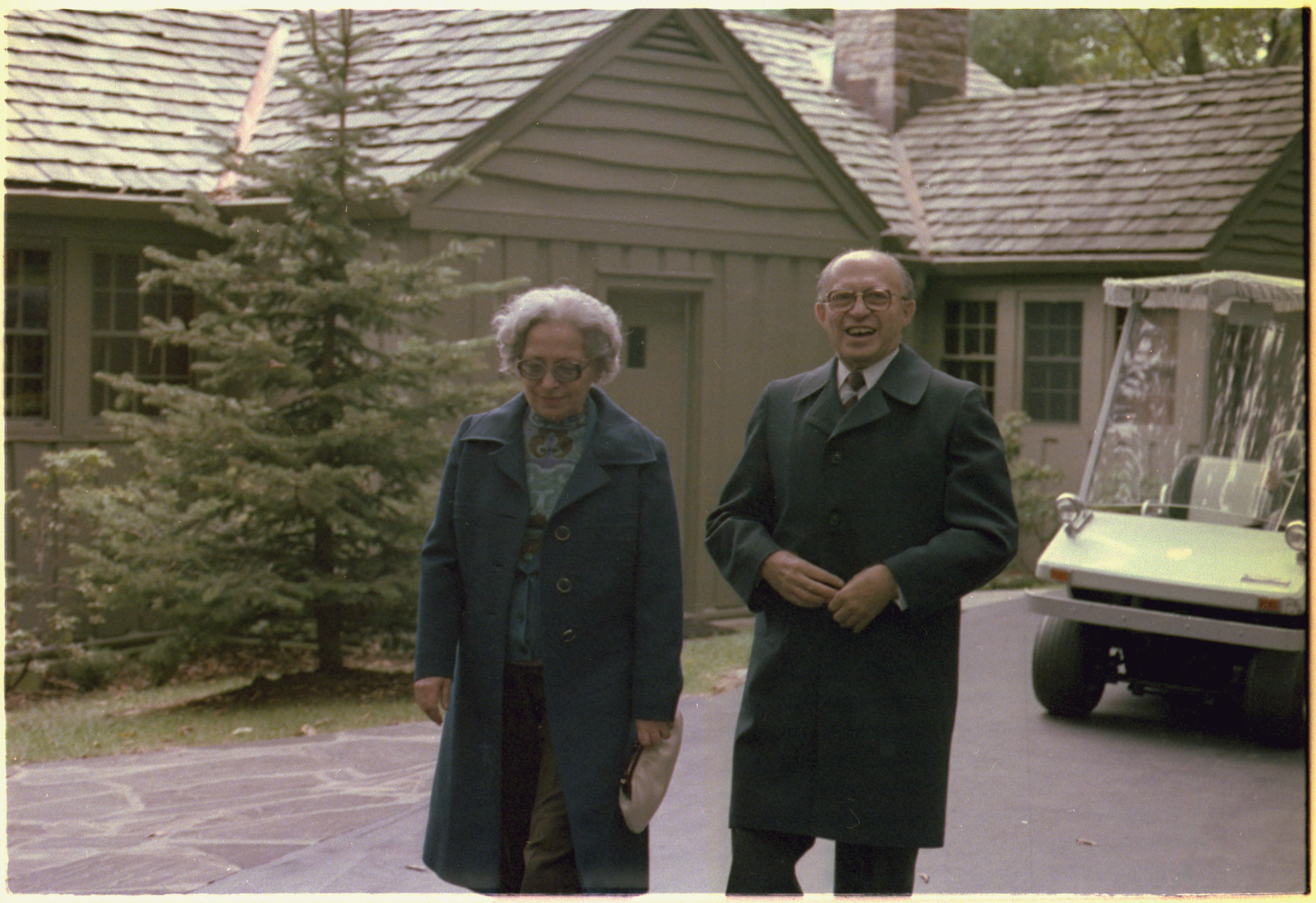
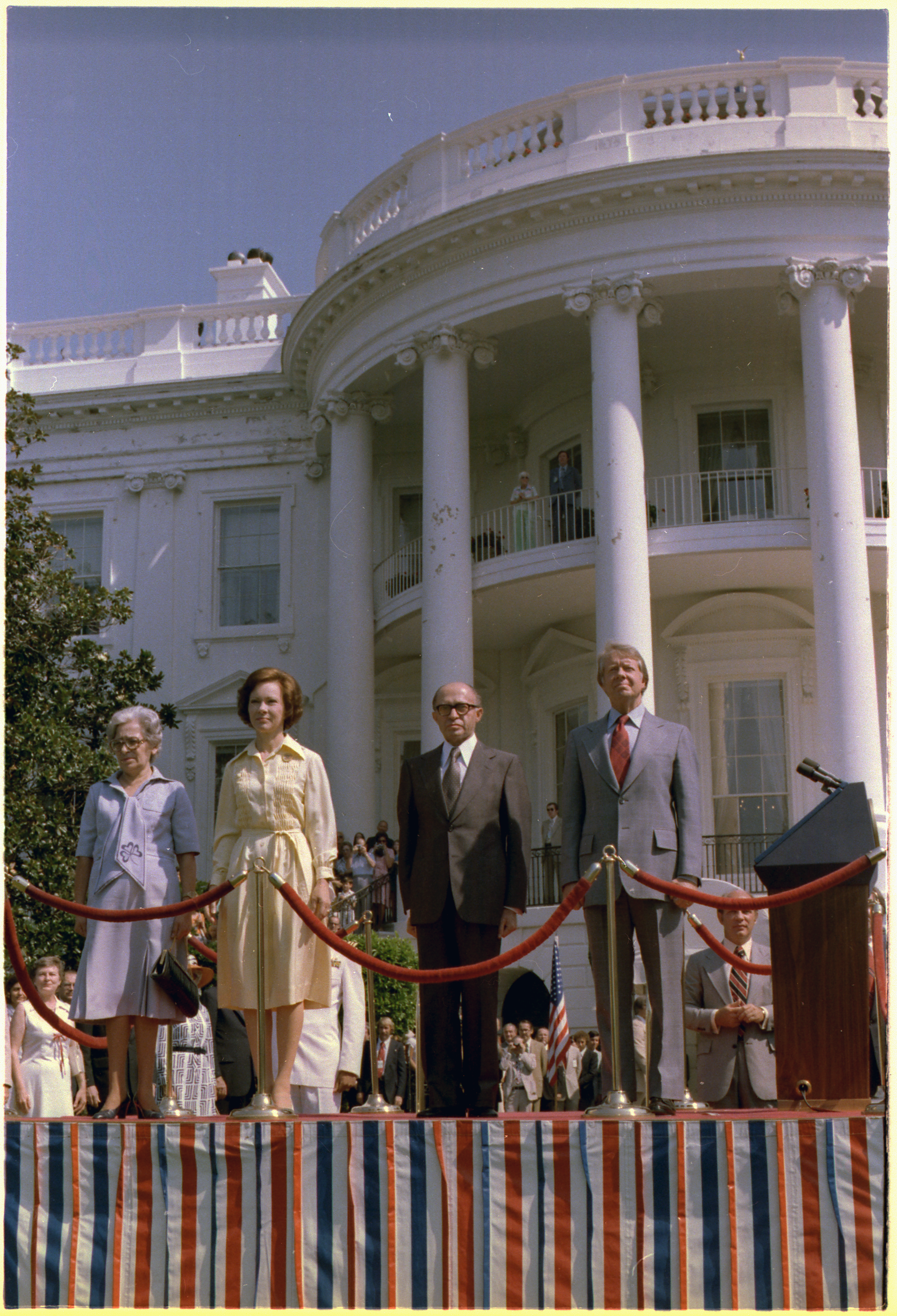
The Begins at Camp David (left) and at the White House (right) in 1978

When Menachem Begin became Prime Minister of Israel in 1977, he invited her to the stage, and in quote from the verse from the book of Jeremiah, he publicly stated before her: "I remember to you the lovingkindness of your youth, the love of your nuptials, your following Me in the desert, in a land not sown." referring to the difficult period he went through when he fought in the Polish army and in the underground against the British Mandate

Weeks after her husband was elected Prime Minister of Israel, Aliza and her husband moved to Beit Aghion. The move to Jerusalem was not easy for Aliza, who suffered from Chronic obstructive pulmonary disease over the years. Some of the people who worked closely with Menachem Begin, including Cabinet Secretary Aryeh Naor and Communications Adviser Dan Patir, said that they had never heard Aliza express in their presence her views in political or diplomatic matters or express disagreement with her husband's policies.

Aliza engaged in extensive volunteer activities for the disadvantaged in society. She was well known in her modesty and used her influence and connections as the Prime Minister's wife in her activities. For example, she contributed to the establishment of hostels and schools for people with disabilities and special needs and raised donations for a variety of organizations involved in the field. The money won from the Nobel Peace Prize, which her husband shared with Egyptian President Anwar Sadat, were all donated to a fund set up to support children and needy students.

== Death ==
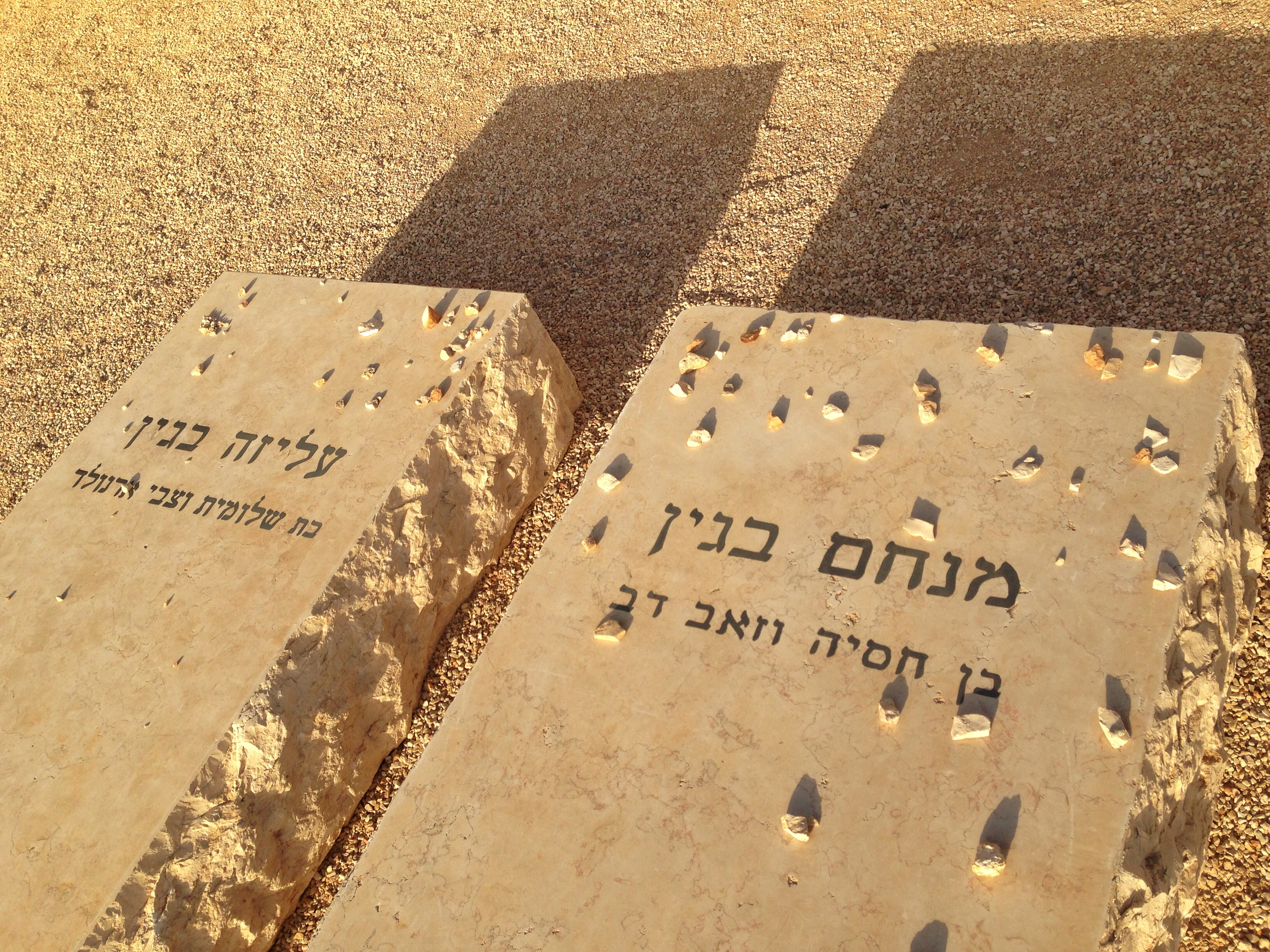
The graves of the Begins on Mount Olivet. Nearby are the graves of Meir Feinstein and Moshe Barazani.

All her life she suffered from a severe lung disease—emphysema. In 1982, her condition deteriorated. She was repeatedly hospitalized, occasionally even needing a ventilator. Billionaire Armand Hammer, who was a fan of her husband, sent two internationally renowned experts to examine her. The treatment they recommended helped for a while.

Aliza Begin died on 13 November 1982, during her husband's visit to the United States, and was buried on the Mount of Olives near the graves of two of Olei Hagardom, Meir Feinstein and Moshe Barazani. Some attributed the crisis in Begin's life to her death. Menachem Begin was buried next to her in 1992.

== Personal life ==
Aliza and Menachem Begin had two daughters, Hassia and Leah, and a son, Zeev Binyamin, a Knesset member and minister.

Begin zealously maintained her privacy, and refrained from being interviewed by the media. Begin used public transportation and refrained from using a government vehicle.

When she arrived with her husband Menachem Begin on her first official visit to the United States, after he was elected prime minister, she refused to allow the Israeli embassy to fund the purchase of shirts for her husband, claiming: "By no means. The taxpayer will not fund my husband's shirts".
