= Sara Netanyahu =

Wife of Benjamin Netanyahu (born 1958)

- שרה נתניהו
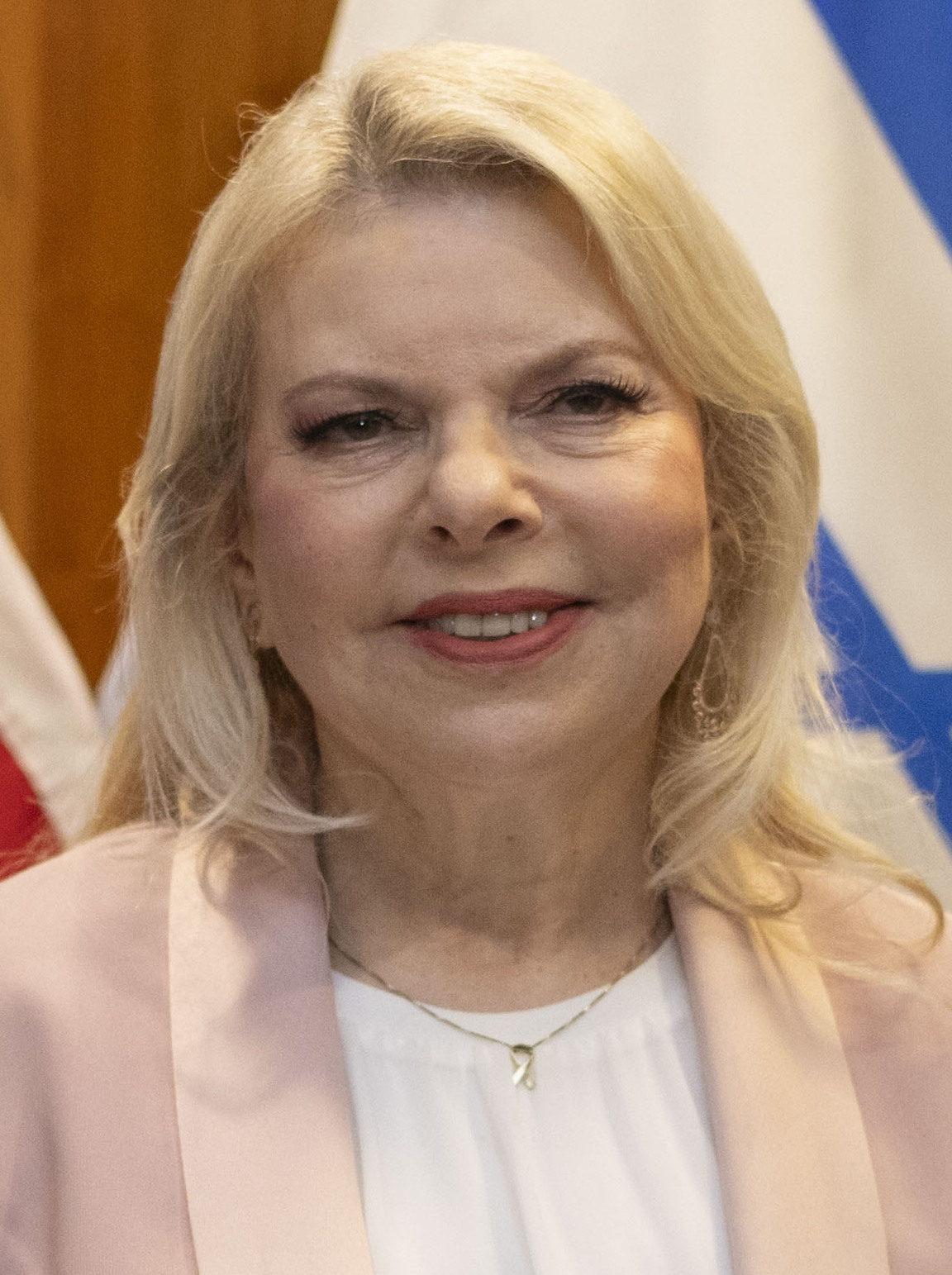
- Netanyahu in 2025

Spouse of the Prime Minister of Israel
- Current
- Assumed role 29 December 2022
- Prime Minister: Benjamin Netanyahu
- Preceded by: Lihi Lapid
- In role 31 March 2009 – 13 June 2021
- Prime Minister: Benjamin Netanyahu
- Preceded by: Aliza Olmert
- Succeeded by: Gilat Bennett
- In role 18 June 1996 – 6 July 1999
- Prime Minister: Benjamin Netanyahu
- Preceded by: Sonia Peres
- Succeeded by: Nava Barak

Personal details
- Born: Sara Ben-Artzi; 5 November 1958 (age 67) Kiryat Tiv'on, Israel
- Spouses: Doron Neuberger (m. 1980; div. 1987) Benjamin Netanyahu (m. 1991)
- Children: 2, including Yair
- Parents: Shmuel Ben-Artzi (father); Chava Paritzky (mother)
- Education: Tel Aviv University (BA); Hebrew University of Jerusalem (MA)
- Occupation: Educational psychologist

Sara Netanyahu (Hebrew: שרה נתניהו; née Ben-Artzi [בן ארצי]; born November 1958) is the spouse of the prime minister of Israel by marriage to Benjamin Netanyahu, holding the role for her third time. By profession, she is an educational and career psychologist.

== Family and education ==
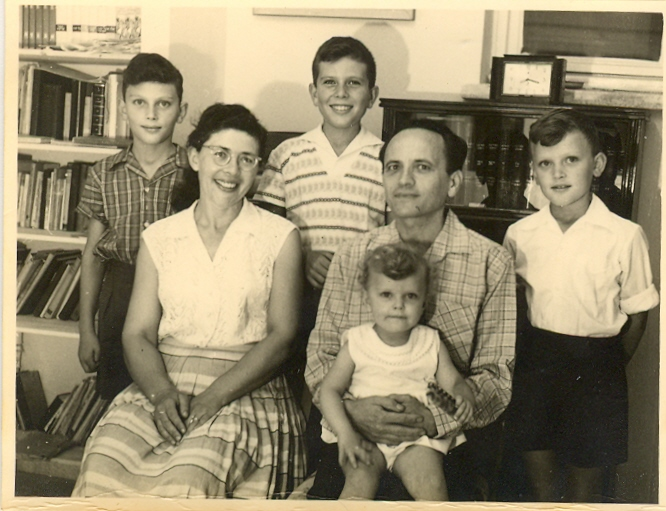
Sara on her father Shmuel Ben-Artzi's lap, 1960

Sara Ben-Artzi (later Netanyahu) was born in the northern Israeli town of Kiryat Tiv'on, near Haifa. Her father, Shmuel Ben-Artzi, was a Polish-born Israeli Jewish educator, author, poet and biblical scholar, who died in 2011 at the age of 96. Her mother, Chava (née Paritzky; 1922–2003), was a sixth-generation Jerusalemite. She has three brothers, all of whom were Israel Bible Contest champions: Matanya Ben-Artzi, a professor of mathematics, Hagai Ben-Artzi, a professor of Bible and Jewish Thought, and Amatzia Ben-Artzi, a technology entrepreneur.

Netanyahu attended Greenberg High School in Kiryat Tiv'on, where she was an outstanding student. She completed a B.A. in psychology at Tel Aviv University in 1984 and her master's degree at the Hebrew University of Jerusalem in 1996.

Netanyahu married Doron Neuberger in 1980. The couple divorced in 1987. In 1991, she married Benjamin Netanyahu. They have two sons, Yair and Avner. In 2010, Avner won the International Bible Contest on the national level, and came in third place on the international level.

== Career ==
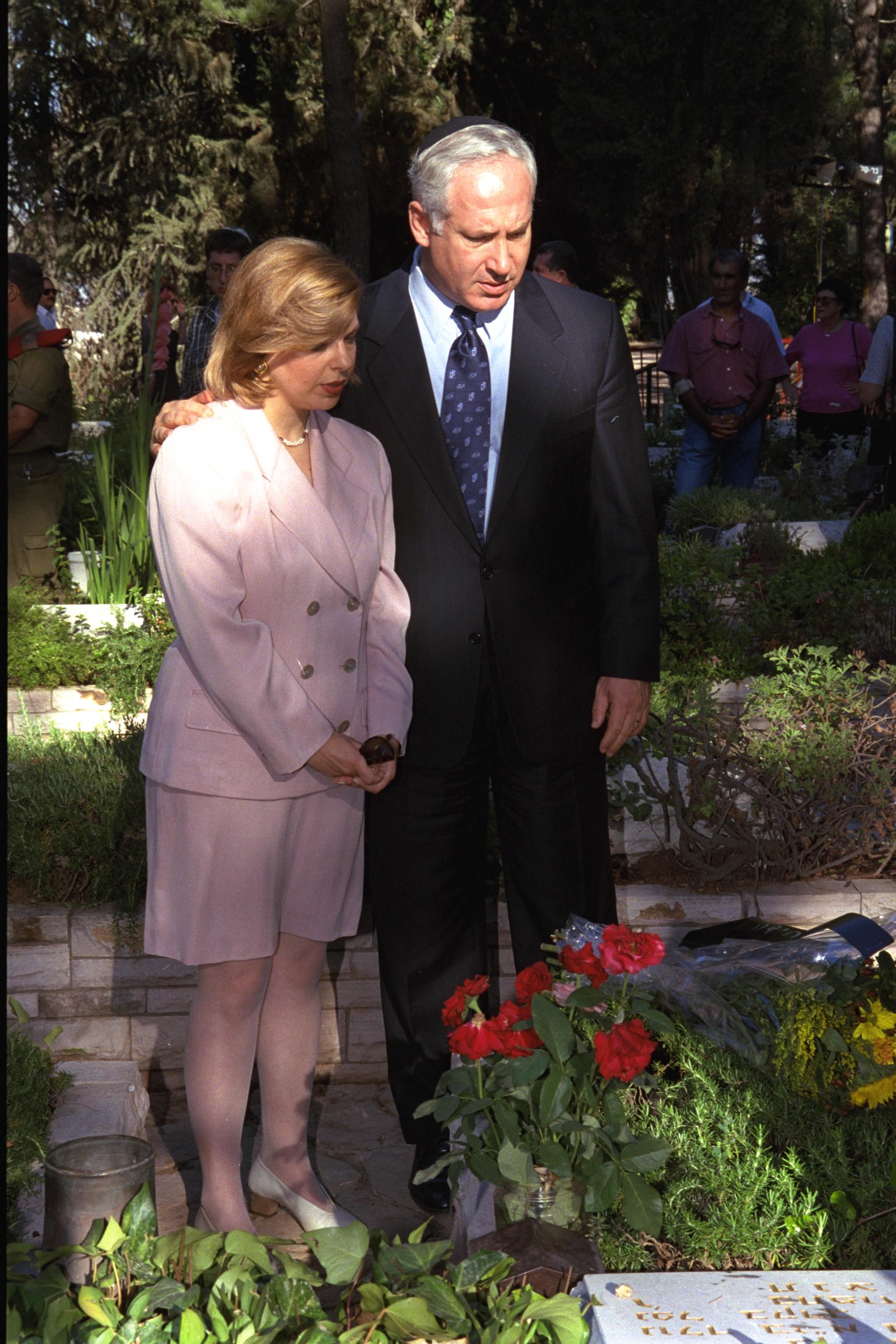
Sara and Benjamin Netanyahu at the grave of Benjamin Netanyahu's brother Yonatan Netanyahu in 1997

Netanyahu worked as a reporter for Maariv LaNoar, a weekly magazine for Israeli teenagers. In the Israel Defense Forces, she was a psycho-technical evaluator in the Department of Behavioral Sciences of the Military Intelligence Directorate ("Aman").

Netanyahu worked as a psychotechnical evaluator of gifted children at the Institute for Promoting Youth Creativity and Excellence headed by Dr. Erika Landau, and at a rehabilitation center of the Ministry of Labour. She also worked as an El Al flight attendant.

As wife of the prime minister, Netanyahu chaired Yad b'Yad, an aid organization for abused children and Tza'ad Kadima for children with cerebral palsy. In 2001, she went to work as an educational psychologist in the psychological service of the Jerusalem Municipality.

Her work includes psychological diagnoses and treatment for children in the school system and assistance to children from families in distress.

== Legal issues ==
Netanyahu has received media coverage for scandals she has been involved in. Haaretz has characterized her as "Israel’s Marie Antoinette".

Netanyahu won a libel case filed against Schocken Books for falsely maligning her, and a libel suit in 2002 against the local paper Kol Ha'ir, after two unfounded reports were published about her in the paper's gossip column.

In 2008, Channel 10 reported that when she travelled to London with her husband for a public diplomacy campaign during the 2006 Lebanon War, she spent a large sum of money on luxuries paid for by a donor in London. In response, Netanyahu filed a libel suit against the channel. As her trip had not been approved by the Knesset's Ethics Committee, her husband was notified by the committee.

In December 2024, Netanyahu was accused of harassing witnesses during the corruption trial against her husband.

On 10 September 2026, Yair Golan announced that he had filed a lawsuit for NIS 2.55 million against Netanyahu, alleging she had defamed him by insinuating that he had had advance knowledge of the October 7 attacks.

=== Alleged abusive treatment of staff ===
In 1996, the firing of the Netanyahu family's nanny, Tanya Shaw, following an incident in which she burned soup sparked a controversy in Israel, dubbed "Nannygate." Shaw alleged that Sara Netanyahu screamed at her and ordered a security guard to throw her out. Shaw's father also alleged that she was often required to work from 6:30 a.m. until past midnight. The Netanyahus denied the allegations and said that Shaw had shown signs of instability.

In January 2010, the family housekeeper sued Netanyahu in a labor court for withholding wages, unfair working conditions and verbal abuse. The case was settled out of court in 2012.

In March 2014, Netanyahu was sued by another caretaker and former bodyguard to the family over claims that she was abusive towards him. In February 2016, the Jerusalem Labor Court ruled in favor of plaintiff Meni Naftali, who claimed that Sara Netanyahu had created a hostile work environment and awarded him damages of NIS 170,000. The National Labor Court subsequently rejected her appeal.

In 2020, an unidentified former residence employee sued Netanyahu for 650,000 NIS, alleging workplace harassment and abuse.

In May 2026, a woman employed in the prime minister's office cafeteria was reportedly paid tens of thousands of shekels by her employment agency after she sued the agency and the state, alleging that Sara Netanyahu had repeatedly humiliated her and once thrown food at her. The woman retracted the lawsuit under a confidential settlement. Netanyahu denied the allegations.

In July 2026, former employee of the prime minister's residence Yehiel Ohev-Ami sued Sara Netanyahu for 300,000 NIS ($98,000), alleging verbal and physical abuse, including that she shoved him against a wall on multiple occasions. He also alleged that Netanyahu, an educational psychologist, "diagnosed" him with autism and then demanded compensation for the diagnosis. The prime minister's office denied the allegations, stating that Ohev-Ami had been dismissed after a short period for professional reasons, and that he had filed the lawsuit only after unsuccessfully seeking reinstatement at the residence. The following month, Rami Ben Hamo, who had worked in the prime minister's office and residence for over a decade, also sued Netanyahu, alleging that she had required him to work unlawfully long hours, perform demeaning tasks, and subjected him to verbal abuse and deragatory ethnic remarks, including calling him an "unsophisticated Moroccan." The prime minister's office denied the allegations, describing them as fake news and part of a "witch hunt" that intensified during election campaigns.

=== Misuse of public funds ===
In 2015, reports surfaced that Netanyahu had ordered catered meals and charged the government nearly $100,000 for the expenses when the Prime Minister's Office already employed a cook. Police recommended indicting her in 2016. On September 8, 2017, Attorney General Avichai Mandelblit announced that Netanyahu would be charged with ordering meals at the state's expense without authorization. On 17 January 2018, the pre-indictment hearing was held. Netanyahu's lawyers met with Mandelblit, while she herself did not attend, breaking with usual custom. After negotiations for a plea bargain collapsed, the trial was set for July 19. Netanyahu's lawyers argued that the meals were ordered by an assistant for visiting dignitaries.

On 16 June 2019, Netanyahu signed a plea deal and was convicted of misusing state funds, with the more severe charge of fraud being dropped. She was ordered to pay 55,000 NIS ($15,275) to the state.

== See also ==
- Women in Israel
- Spouse of the Prime Minister of Israel
