= Dana Olmert =

Israeli left wing activist, literary theorist and editor

- דנה אולמרט
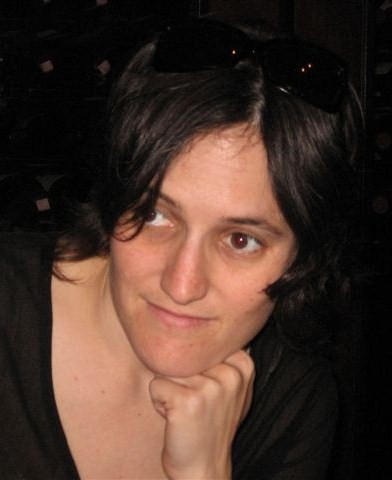
- Born: 26 December 1972 (age 53)

Dana Olmert (Hebrew: דנה אולמרט; born 26 December 1972), is an Israeli left wing activist, literary theorist and editor. She is a daughter of Israel's former Prime Minister Ehud Olmert.

Olmert graduated with a PhD in literature from the Hebrew University of Jerusalem on "The Growth of Hebrew Poetry by Women During the Twenties: Psychoanalytical and Feminist Perspectives." She teaches literature at Tel Aviv University and lately teaches creative writing workshops. She is the editor of a poetry series and was invited to several juries of literary prizes.

She volunteered for Machsom Watch. In June 2006, she attended a march in Tel Aviv protesting alleged Israeli complicity in the Gaza beach blast which made her the subject of criticism from right-wing personalities.

Olmert is a lesbian and is a supporter of the Pride parade in Israel. She lives with her partner, Dafna Ben-Zvi, in Tel Aviv. The couple have a daughter.
