= Twenty-second government of Israel =

1986–88 government led by Yitzhak Shamir

Second Shamir Cabinet
- 22nd Cabinet of Israel

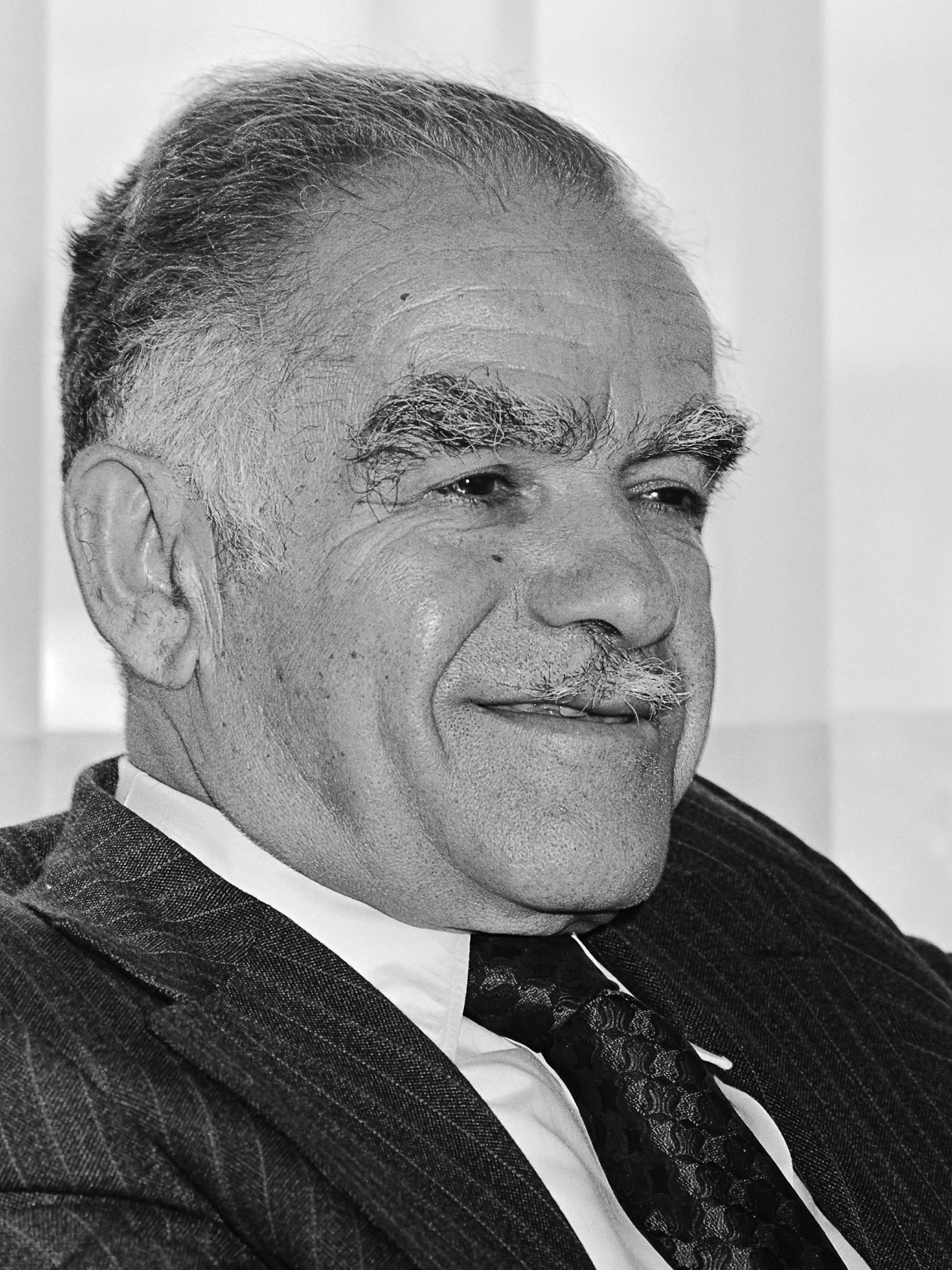
- Date formed: 20 October 1986
- Date dissolved: 22 December 1988

People and organisations
- Head of state: Chaim Herzog
- Head of government: Yitzhak Shamir
- Member parties: Likud; Alignment; Shinui (until 26 May 1987); Shas; National Religious Party; Ometz; Agudat Yisrael
- Status in legislature: National Unity Rotation government
- Opposition parties: Mapam; Tehiya; Hadash; Ratz; Progressive List for Peace; Tami; Tzomet (from 1987) (Note: Tzomet existed as a party in the Tehiya-Tzomet joint faction before this government, but in 1986 was absorbed by Tehiya. In 1987, it was re-established separate from Tehiya.)
- Opposition leaders: Victor Shem-Tov (1986–March 1988); Yair Tzaban (March–December 1988)

History
- Legislature term: 11th Knesset
- Predecessor: 21st Cabinet of Israel
- Successor: 23rd Cabinet of Israel

The twenty-second government of Israel was formed by Yitzhak Shamir of Likud on 20 October 1986. Shamir replaced Shimon Peres of the Alignment as Prime Minister as part of a rotation deal within the national unity coalition between the two parties. The only other change to the coalition was that the one-seat Morasha faction was not included, with the National Religious Party, Agudat Yisrael, Shas, Shinui and Ometz remaining part of the government, although Shinui left on 26 May 1987.

The government held office until 22 December 1988, when the twenty-third government was formed, following the November 1988 elections.

== Cabinet members ==
| Position | Person | Party |
|---|---|---|
| Prime Minister | Yitzhak Shamir | Likud |
| Acting Prime Minister (de facto Alternate) | Shimon Peres | Alignment |
| Deputy Prime Minister | David Levy | Likud |
| Deputy Prime Minister | Yitzhak Navon | Alignment |
| Minister of Agriculture | Aryeh Nehemkin | Alignment |
| Minister of Communications | Amnon Rubinstein (until 26 May 1987) | Shinui |
| Minister of Communications | Gad Yaacobi (from 9 June 1987) | Alignment |
| Minister of Defense | Yitzhak Rabin | Alignment |
| Minister of Economics and Planning | Gad Yaacobi | Alignment |
| Minister of Education and Culture | Yitzhak Navon | Alignment |
| Minister of Energy and Infrastructure | Moshe Shahal | Alignment |
| Minister of Finance | Moshe Nissim | Likud |
| Minister of Foreign Affairs | Shimon Peres | Alignment |
| Minister of Health | Shoshana Arbeli-Almozlino | Alignment |
| Minister of Housing and Construction | David Levy | Likud |
| Minister of Immigrant Absorption | Ya'akov Tzur | Alignment |
| Minister of Industry and Trade | Ariel Sharon | Likud |
| Minister of Internal Affairs | Yitzhak Peretz (until 6 January 1987) | Shas |
| Minister of Justice | Avraham Sharir | Likud |
| Minister of Labour and Social Welfare | Moshe Katsav | Likud |
| Minister of Police | Haim Bar-Lev | Alignment |
| Minister of Religious Affairs | Zevulun Hammer | National Religious Party |
| Minister of Science and Development | Gideon Patt | Likud |
| Minister of Tourism | Avraham Sharir | Likud |
| Minister of Transportation | Haim Corfu | Likud |
| Minister without Portfolio | Moshe Arens (4 September 1987 - 18 April 1988) | Likud |
| Minister without Portfolio | Mordechai Gur (from 18 April 1987) | Alignment |
| Minister without Portfolio | Yigal Hurvitz | Ometz |
| Minister without Portfolio | Yitzhak Moda'i | Likud |
| Minister without Portfolio | Yitzhak Peretz (from 25 May 1987) | Shas |
| Minister without Portfolio | Yosef Shapira | Not an MK |
| Minister without Portfolio | Ezer Weizman | Alignment |
| Deputy Minister in the Prime Minister's Office | Roni Milo (until 21 November 1988) | Likud |
| Deputy Minister of Agriculture | Avraham Katz-Oz | Alignment |
| Deputy Minister of Defense | Michael Dekel (until 21 November 1988) | Likud |
| Deputy Minister of Finance | Adiel Amorai | Alignment |
| Deputy Minister of Labour and Social Welfare | Rafael Pinhasi | Shas |
