= Twenty-first government of Israel =

1984–1986 government led by Shimon Peres

First Peres Cabinet
- 21st Cabinet of Israel

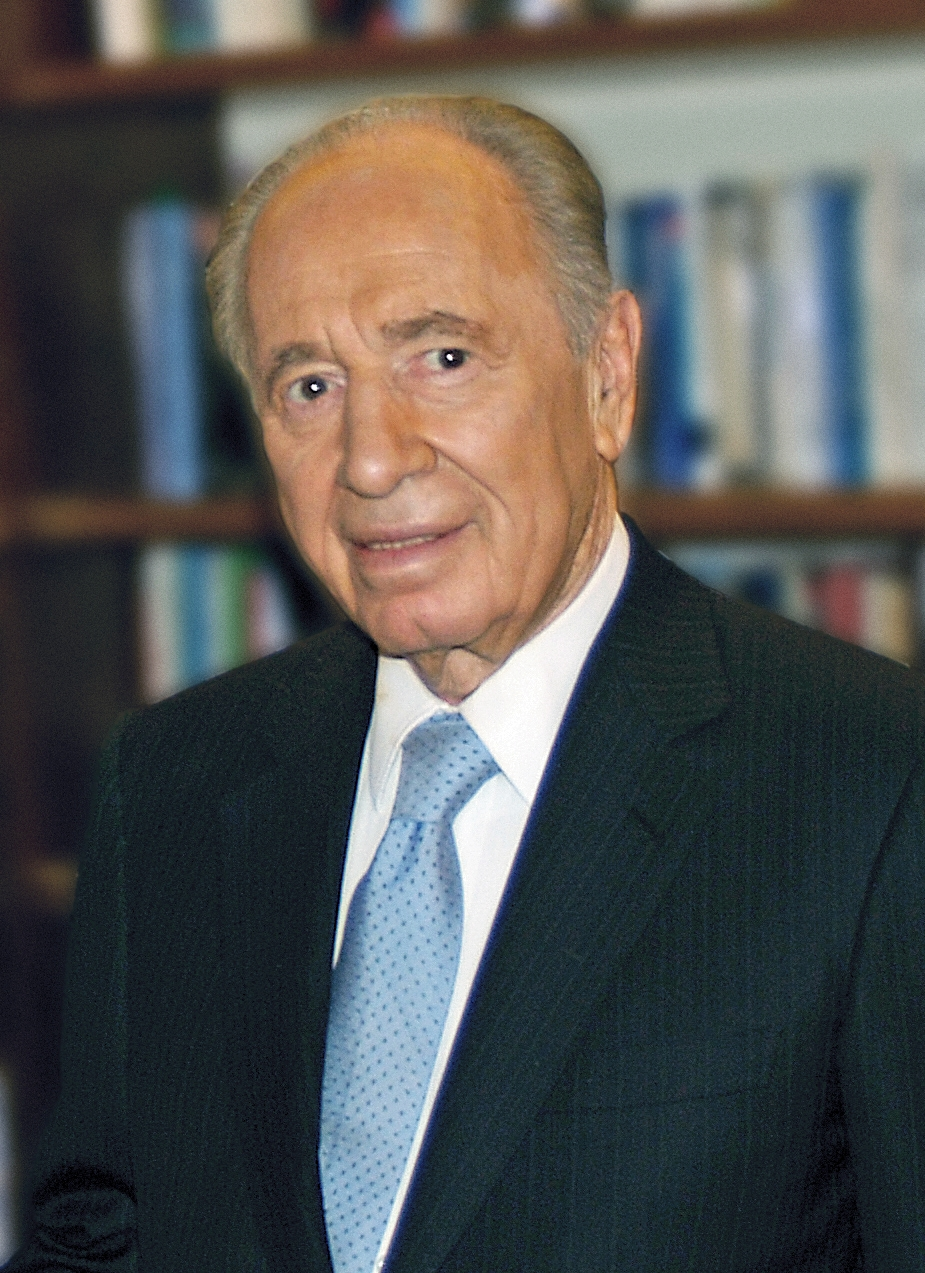
- Date formed: 13 September 1984
- Date dissolved: 20 October 1986

People and organisations
- Head of state: Chaim Herzog
- Head of government: Shimon Peres
- Member parties: Alignment; Likud; Shinui; Shas; National Religious Party; Ometz; Yahad; Agudat Yisrael; Morasha
- Status in legislature: National Unity; Rotation government
- Opposition parties: Mapam (from October 1984); Tehiya-Tzomet; Hadash; Ratz; Progressive List for Peace; Tami
- Opposition leader: Yuval Ne'eman (September–October 1984); Victor Shem-Tov (October 1984-1986)

History
- Election: 1984
- Legislature term: 11th Knesset
- Predecessor: 20th Cabinet of Israel
- Successor: 22nd Cabinet of Israel

The twenty-first government of Israel was formed by Shimon Peres of the Alignment on 13 September 1984, following the July elections. With both the Alignment and Likud winning over 40 seats each, neither side could form a stand-alone coalition, resulting in a national unity government, together with the National Religious Party, Agudat Yisrael, Shas, Morasha, Shinui and Ometz, which together held 97 of the 120 seats in the Knesset. However, in protest at the alliance with Likud, Mapam broke away from the Alignment, as did Yossi Sarid, who joined Ratz.

The government was replaced by the twenty-second government on 20 October 1986, when Yitzhak Shamir replaced Peres as prime minister in accordance with the rotation agreement between the Alignment and Likud. The rotation agreement also led to the creation of the post of acting prime minister, who would take over the powers of prime minister if they were incapable of fulfilling their duties, as opposed to the deputy prime minister, which was a symbolic role. The Minister of Police was also restored to the cabinet.

== Cabinet members ==
Position	Person	Party
Prime Minister	Shimon Peres	Alignment
Acting Prime Minister (de facto Alternate)	Yitzhak Shamir	Likud
Deputy Prime Minister	David Levy	Likud
Deputy Prime Minister	Yitzhak Navon	Alignment
Minister of Agriculture	Aryeh Nehemkin	Alignment
Minister of Communications	Amnon Rubinstein	Shinui
Minister of Defense	Yitzhak Rabin	Alignment
Minister of Economics and Planning ^{1}	Gad Yaacobi	Alignment
Minister of Education and Culture	Yitzhak Navon	Alignment
Minister of Energy and Infrastructure	Moshe Shahal	Alignment
Minister of Finance	Yitzhak Moda'i (until 16 April 1986)	Likud
Minister of Finance	Moshe Nissim (from 16 April 1986)	Likud
Minister of Foreign Affairs	Yitzhak Shamir	Likud
Minister of Health	Mordechai Gur	Alignment
Minister of Housing and Construction	David Levy	Likud
Minister of Immigrant Absorption	Ya'akov Tzur	Alignment
Minister of Industry and Trade	Ariel Sharon	Likud
Minister of Internal Affairs	Shimon Peres (until 24 December 1984)	Alignment
Minister of Internal Affairs	Yitzhak Peretz (from 24 December 1984)	Shas
Minister of Justice	Moshe Nissim (until 16 April 1986)	Likud
Minister of Justice	Yitzhak Moda'i (16 April 1986 - 23 July 1986)	Likud
Minister of Justice	Avraham Sharir (from 23 July 1986)	Likud
Minister of Labour and Social Welfare	Moshe Katsav	Likud
Minister of Police	Haim Bar-Lev	Alignment
Minister of Religious Affairs	Shimon Peres (until 23 December 1984)	Alignment
Minister of Religious Affairs	Yosef Burg (23 December 1984 - 5 October 1986)	National Religious Party
Minister of Religious Affairs	Zevulun Hammer (from 5 October 1986)	National Religious Party
Minister of Science and Development	Gideon Patt	Likud
Minister of Tourism	Avraham Sharir	Likud
Minister of Transportation	Haim Corfu	Likud
Minister without Portfolio	Yitzhak Peretz (until 18 December 1984)	Shas
Minister without Portfolio	Yosef Burg (until 23 December 1984)	National Religious Party
Minister without Portfolio	Moshe Arens	Likud
Minister without Portfolio	Yigal Hurvitz	Ometz
Minister without Portfolio	Yosef Shapira	Not an MK
Minister without Portfolio	Ezer Weizman	Yahad, Alignment
Deputy Minister of Agriculture	Avraham Katz-Oz	Alignment
Deputy Minister of Defense	Michael Dekel (from 3 December 1985)	Likud
Deputy Minister of Finance	Adiel Amorai	Alignment
Deputy Minister of Foreign Affairs	Roni Milo	Likud
Deputy Minister of Health	Shoshana Arbeli-Almozlino	Alignment
Deputy Minister of Labour and Social Welfare	Menachem Porush (until 2 December 1985)	Agudat Yisrael
Deputy Minister of Labour and Social Welfare	Rafael Pinhasi (from 2 December 1985)	Shas

^{1} The post was initially called the Minister of Economics and Inter-Ministry Coordination, before being renamed on 16 September 1984.
