= Twenty-third government of Israel =

1988–90 government led by Yitzhak Shamir

Third Shamir Cabinet
- 23rd Cabinet of Israel

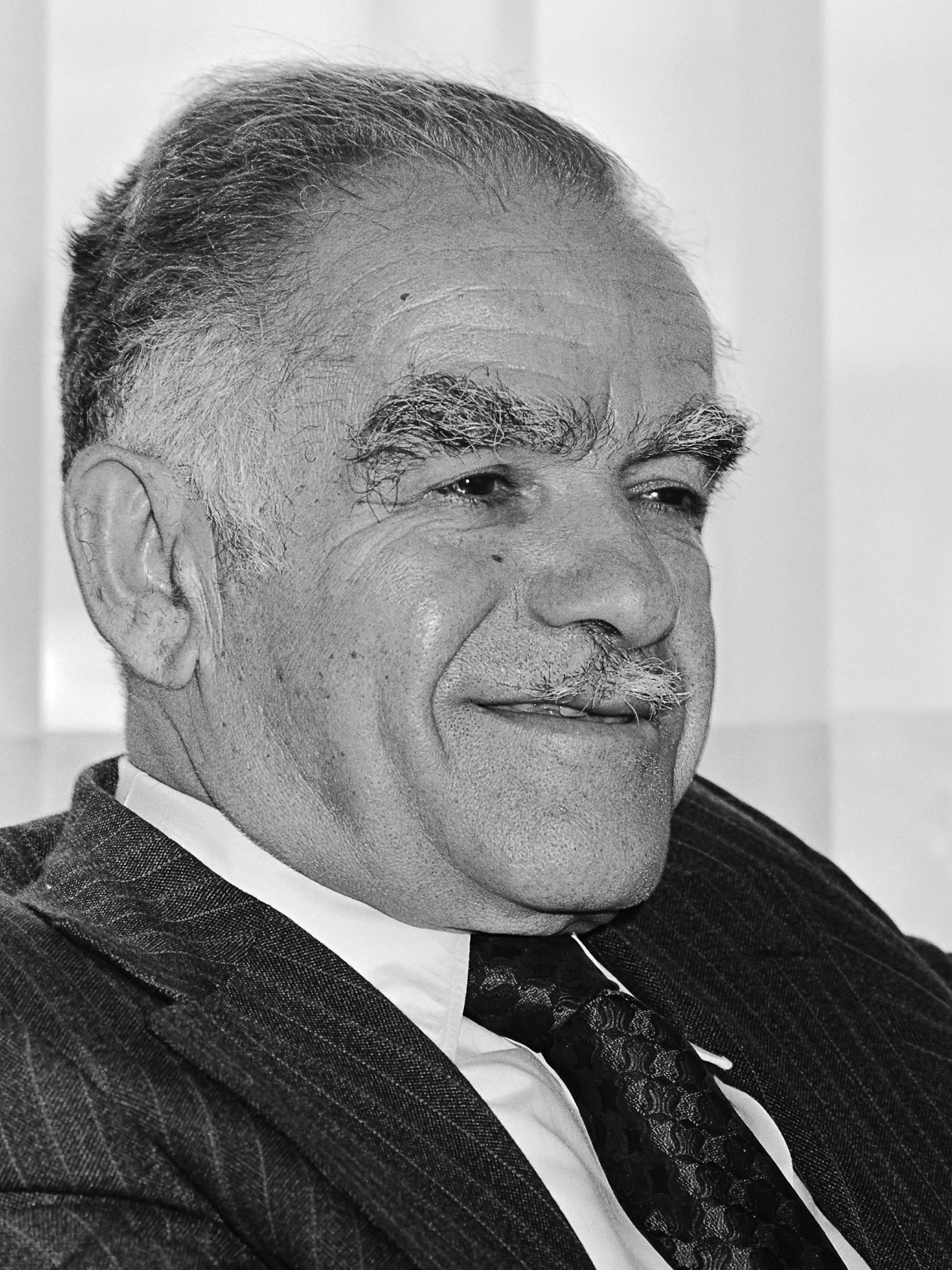
- Date formed: 22 December 1988
- Date dissolved: 11 June 1990

People and organisations
- Head of state: Chaim Herzog
- Head of government: Yitzhak Shamir
- Member parties: Likud; Alignment (until 15 March 1990); Shas; National Religious Party; Agudat Yisrael; Degel HaTorah
- Status in legislature: National Unity Government
- Opposition leader: Shulamit Aloni

History
- Election: 1988 Israeli legislative election
- Legislature term: 12th Knesset
- Predecessor: 22nd Cabinet of Israel
- Successor: 24th Cabinet of Israel

The twenty-third government of Israel was formed by Yitzhak Shamir of Likud on 22 December 1988, following the November 1988 elections. The government remained a national unity coalition between Likud and the Alignment, with the National Religious Party, Shas, Agudat Yisrael and Degel HaTorah also being members of the coalition. It was the first government to have a Minister of the Environment.

In 1990, after Shamir refused to accept a peace initiative developed by United States Secretary of State James Baker, the Alignment filed a motion of no-confidence in the government. Shamir fired all the Alignment ministers, but the vote was passed by 60–55, meaning that President Chaim Herzog had to ask one of the party leaders to form a new government. It was the first, and to date, only time which a government was brought down by a no confidence motion. Herzog initially asked Alignment leader Shimon Peres to form a new government, but after Peres was unable to, turned to Shamir, who successfully formed the twenty-fourth government on 11 June. The incident became known as the dirty trick.

== Cabinet members ==
Position	Person	Party
Prime Minister	Yitzhak Shamir	Likud
Acting Prime Minister	Shimon Peres (until 15 March 1990)	Alignment
Deputy Prime Minister	David Levy	Likud
Deputy Prime Minister	Yitzhak Navon (until 15 March 1990)	Alignment
Minister of Agriculture	Avraham Katz-Oz (until 15 March 1990)	Alignment
Minister of Communications	Gad Yaacobi (until 15 March 1990)	Alignment
Minister of Defense	Yitzhak Rabin (until 15 March 1990)	Alignment
Minister of Economics and Planning	Yitzhak Moda'i	Likud
Minister of Education and Culture	Yitzhak Navon (until 15 March 1990)	Alignment
Minister of Energy and Infrastructure	Moshe Shahal (until 15 March 1990)	Alignment
Minister of the Environment	Roni Milo (until 7 March 1990)	Likud
Minister of the Environment	Rafael Edri (7–15 March 1990)	Alignment
Minister of Finance	Shimon Peres (until 15 March 1990)	Alignment
Minister of Foreign Affairs	Moshe Arens	Likud
Minister of Health	Ya'akov Tzur (until 15 March 1990)	Alignment
Minister of Housing and Construction	David Levy	Likud
Minister of Immigrant Absorption	Yitzhak Peretz	Shas
Minister of Industry and Trade	Ariel Sharon (until 20 February 1990)	Likud
Minister of Industry and Trade	Moshe Nissim (from 20 February 1990)	Likud
Minister of Internal Affairs	Aryeh Deri	Not an MK ^{1}
Minister of Justice	Dan Meridor	Likud
Minister of Labour and Social Welfare	Yitzhak Shamir (until 7 March 1990)	Likud
Minister of Labour and Social Welfare	Roni Milo (from 7 March 1990)	Likud
Minister of Police	Haim Bar-Lev (until 15 March 1990)	Alignment
Minister of Religious Affairs	Zevulun Hammer	National Religious Party
Minister of Science and Development	Ezer Weizman (until 15 March 1990)	Alignment
Minister of Tourism	Avraham Sharir	Likud
Minister of Transportation	Moshe Katsav	Likud
Minister without Portfolio	Rafael Edri (until 7 March 1990)	Alignment
Minister without Portfolio	Moshe Nissim (until 7 March 1990)	Likud
Minister without Portfolio	Mordechai Gur (until 15 March 1990)	Alignment
Minister without Portfolio	Ehud Olmert	Likud
Minister without Portfolio	Avner Shaki (from 27 December 1988)	National Religious Party
Minister without Portfolio	David Magen	Likud
Deputy Minister of Finance	Yossi Beilin (until 15 March 1990)	Alignment
Deputy Minister of Foreign Affairs	Benjamin Netanyahu	Likud
Deputy Minister of Internal Affairs	Rafael Pinhasi	Shas
Deputy Minister of Labour and Social Welfare	Moshe Ze'ev Feldman	Agudat Yisrael

^{1} Although Deri was not a Knesset member at the time, he was a member of Shas.
