= Eleventh government of Israel =

1963–64 government led by Levi Eshkol

First Eshkol Cabinet
- 11th Cabinet of Israel

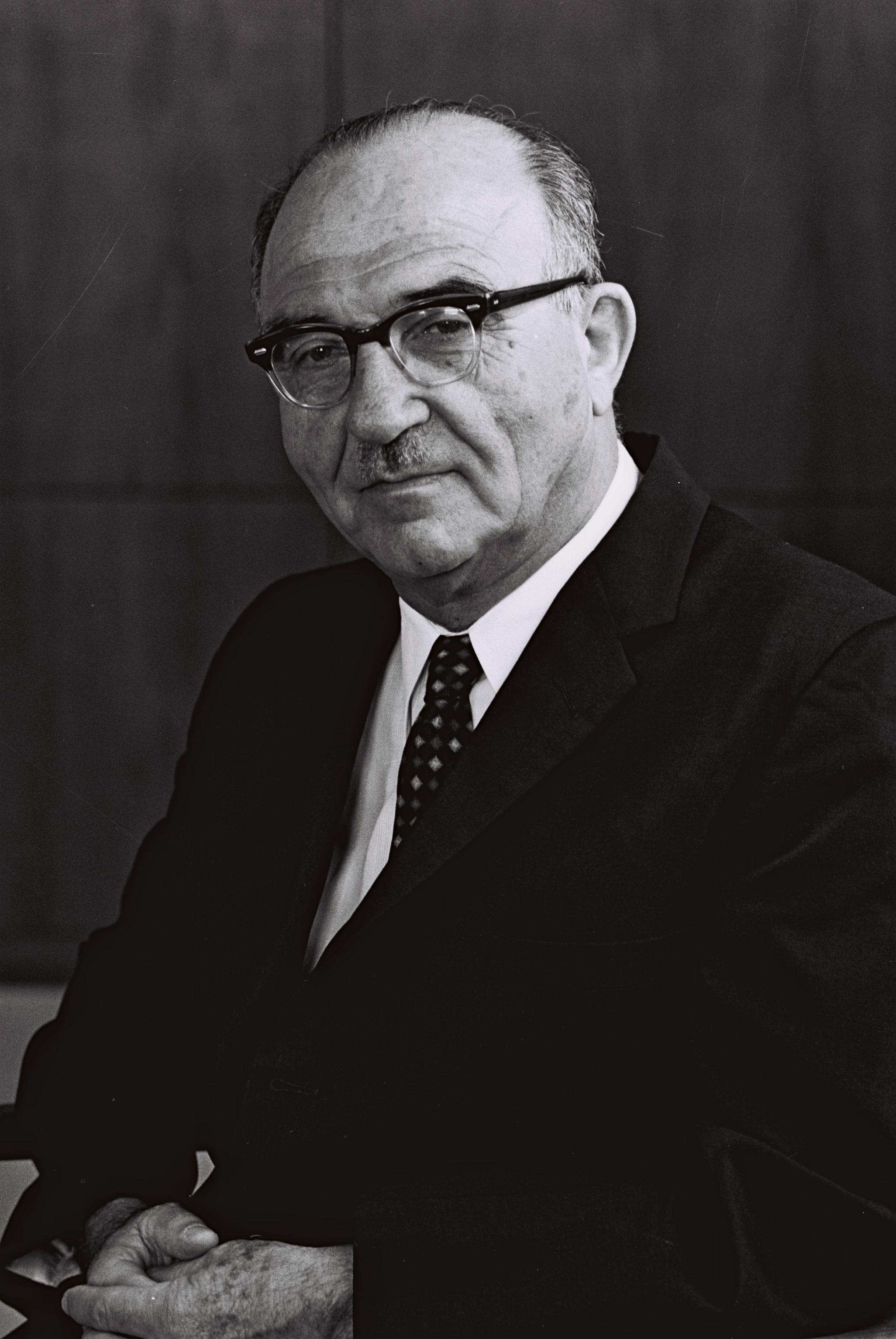
- Date formed: 26 June 1963
- Date dissolved: 22 December 1964

People and organisations
- Head of state: Zalman Shazar
- Head of government: Levi Eshkol
- Member parties: Mapai; National Religious Party; Ahdut HaAvoda; Poalei Agudat Yisrael; Cooperation and Brotherhood; Progress and Development
- Status in legislature: coalition
- Opposition leader: Menachem Begin

History
- Legislature term: 5th Knesset
- Predecessor: 10th Cabinet of Israel
- Successor: 12th cabinet of Israel

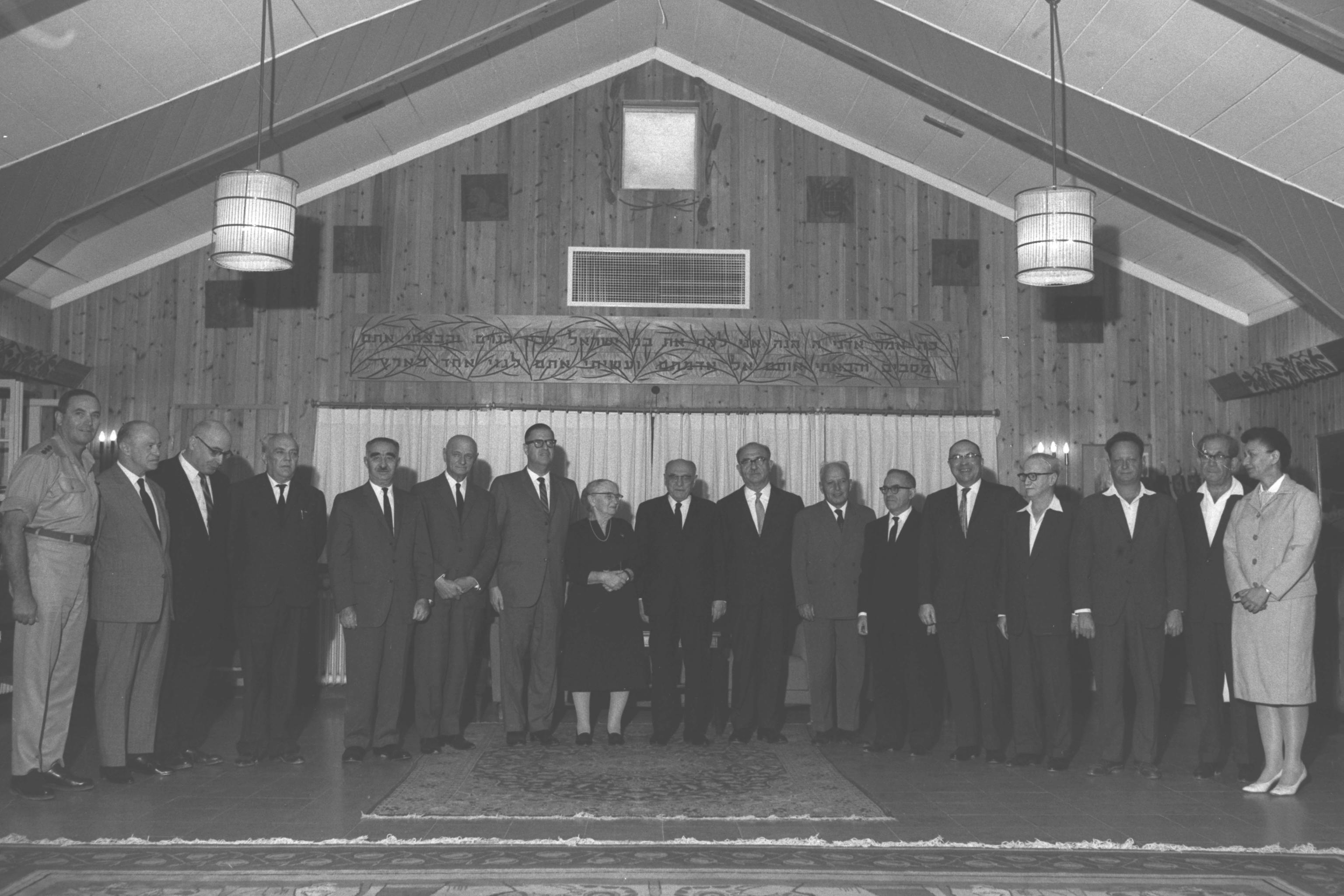
Eleventh government of Israel on the occasion of president Zalman Shazar's 75th birthday, 1964

The eleventh government of Israel was formed on 26 June 1963, midway through the fifth Knesset. It was the first government formed by Levi Eshkol following the second resignation of David Ben-Gurion.

Eshkol kept the same coalition partners as previously, i.e. Mapai, the National Religious Party, Ahdut HaAvoda, Poalei Agudat Yisrael, Cooperation and Brotherhood and Progress and Development. There were few changes, with Eshkol replacing Ben-Gurion in the dual role of Prime Minister and Minister of Defense, Pinhas Sapir replacing Eshkol as Minister of Finance, and Abba Eban replacing Zalman Aran as Education Minister, as well as becoming the country's second Deputy Prime Minister. Eshkol presented it as a "government of continuity". Deputy Ministers were appointed on 1 July.

The government resigned following the resignation of Eshkol on 14 December 1964. Eshkol had quit over a dispute with Ben-Gurion concerning the Lavon Affair, which Ben Gurion had demanded that the Supreme Court investigate. The twelfth government was formed a week later.

Israeli government formation, 1963
- 23 June 1963
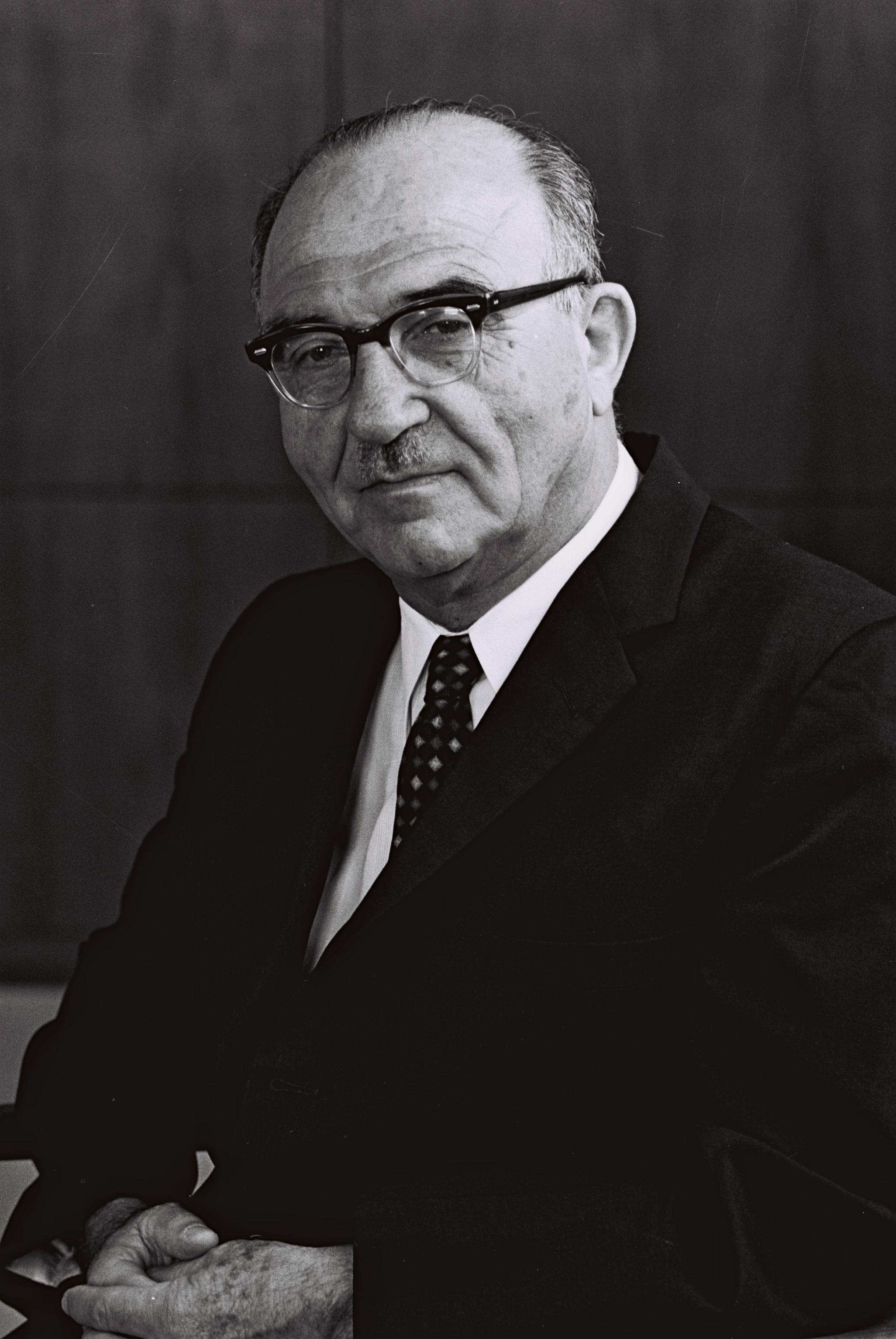

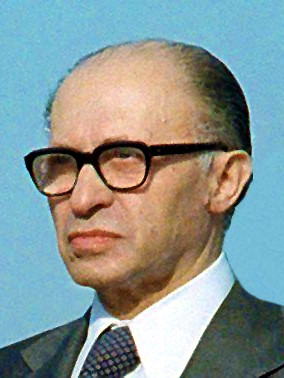
Nominee	Levi Eshkol	Menachem Begin
Party	Mapai	Herut
Electoral vote	68	52
Percentage	56.7%	43.3%
Prime Minister before election
David Ben Gurion
Mapai
Elected Prime Minister
Levi Eshkol
Mapai

== Cabinet members ==
Eleventh Government of Israel
Portfolio	Minister	Party
Prime Minister; Minister of Defense	Levi Eshkol	Mapai
Deputy Prime Minister	Abba Eban	Mapai
Minister of Agriculture	Moshe Dayan (26 June 1963 – 4 November 1964)	Mapai
Minister of Agriculture	Haim Gvati (9 November – 22 December 1964)	Not an MK ^{1}
Minister of Development; Minister of Housing	Yosef Almogi	Mapai
Minister of Education and Culture	Zalman Aran	Mapai
Minister of Finance; Minister of Trade and Industry	Pinchas Sapir	Mapai
Minister of Foreign Affairs	Golda Meir	Mapai
Minister of Health; Minister of Internal Affairs	Haim-Moshe Shapira	National Religious Party
Minister of Justice	Dov Yosef	Not an MK ^{2}
Minister of Labour	Yigal Allon	Mapai
Minister of Police	Bechor-Shalom Sheetrit	Mapai
Minister of Postal Services	Eliyahu Sasson	Not an MK ^{3}
Minister of Religions	Zerach Warhaftig	National Religious Party
Minister of Transportation	Yisrael Bar-Yehuda	Ahdut HaAvoda
Minister of Welfare	Yosef Burg	National Religious Party
Minister without Portfolio	Akiva Govrin (1 December 1963 – 22 December 1964)	Mapai
Deputy Minister of Defense	Shimon Peres (1 July 1963 – 22 December 1964)	Mapai
Deputy Minister of Education and Culture	Kalman Kahana (1 July 1963 – 22 December 1964)	Poalei Agudat Yisrael
Deputy Minister of Education and Culture	Aharon Yadlin (1 June – 22 December 1964)	Mapai
Deputy Minister of Health	Yitzhak Rafael (1 July 1963 – 22 December 1964)	National Religious Party
Deputy Minister of Internal Affairs	Shlomo-Yisrael Ben-Meir (1 July 1963 – 22 December 1964)	National Religious Party

^{1} Although Gvati was not an MK at the time, he later entered the Knesset as a member of the Alignment, a merger or Mapai and Ahdut HaAvoda.

^{2} Although Yosef was not an MK at the time, he was a member of Mapai.

^{3} Although Sasson was not an MK at the time, he was elected to the next Knesset as a member of the Alignment, an alliance of Mapai and Ahdut HaAvoda.
