= Alternate Prime Minister of Israel =

Israeli government office created in 2020

- רֹאשׁ הַמֶּמְשָׁלָה הַחֲלִיפִי
- Emblem of Israel
- Incumbent; Vacant since 8 November 2022
- Status: De facto second in the Cabinet of Israel
- Nominator: Knesset
- Appointer: President
- Inaugural holder: Benny Gantz
- Formation: 17 May 2020; 6 years ago
- Succession: 1st

The alternate prime minister of Israel (Hebrew: ראש הממשלה החליפי, romanized: Rosh ha-memshela ha-ḥalifi) (Note: While the Basic Law passed on 7 May 2020 used the phrasing "חלופי", the Academy of the Hebrew Language published on 11 May an article explaining that the proper Hebrew phrasing is "חליפי") is the de facto deputy of the prime minister of Israel and the second highest ranking cabinet minister, who is designated to replace the prime minister of Israel in a rotation government. The position was created de jure to resolve the 2018–2022 Israeli political crisis, alongside the formal rotation mechanism of the alternation government. It existed de facto in the 1984–88 rotation government, which was established on the basis of a non-binding rotation agreement. According to the Basic Law: The Government, the government swearing-in includes a target date for the prime minister and alternate prime minister to switch their posts. Government ministers report either to the prime minister or the alternate prime minister, with the prime minister being unable to dismiss cabinet ministers reporting to the alternate prime minister without the alternate prime minister's consent.

The most recent alternate prime minister was Naftali Bennett, who served from 1 July to 8 November 2022.

== List of alternate prime ministers ==
=== De facto ===
No.	Portrait	Minister	Party	Government	Term start	Term end	Notes
–		Yitzhak Shamir	Likud; Herut	21	13 September 1984	20 October 1986	Shamir was prime minister-designate in a rotation government with Shimon Peres. The rotation deal was not binding as no legally-entrenched rotation mechanism existed at the time, and the de jure post held by Shamir was that of an ordinary designated acting prime minister.
–		Shimon Peres	Alignment; Labor Party	22	20 October 1986	22 December 1988	Shamir became prime minister on 20 October 1986, with Peres as his alternate, in accordance with the 1984 rotation deal. The national unity government was extended in 1988 but without a rotation agreement. The rotation deal was not legally binding as no legally-entrenched rotation mechanism existed at the time, and the de jure post held by Peres was that of an ordinary designated acting prime minister.

=== De jure ===
No.	Portrait	Minister	Party	Government	Term start	Term end	Notes
1		Benny Gantz	Blue and White; Resilience Party	35	17 May 2020	13 June 2021	Gantz was prime minister-designate in an alternation government with Benjamin Netanyahu, and he would have come into office on 17 November 2021. In December 2020, the coalition collapsed, and was replaced by a new government on 13 June 2021.
2		Yair Lapid	Yesh Atid	36	13 June 2021	30 June 2022	Lapid was prime minister-designate in an alternation government with Naftali Bennett. According to the law, the switch was supposed to have taken place on 27 August 2023, which would have been the half-term of the 36th government. The law also stipulated that if the sitting prime minister were to dissolve the Knesset prior to the date of the switch, the switch would take place immediately upon the dissolution. Since Bennett dissolved the Knesset on 30 June 2022, Lapid took over as prime minister on the following day.
3		Naftali Bennett	Yamina; New Right	36	1 July 2022	8 November 2022	Bennett became Alternate Prime Minister after the early dissolution of the Knesset in June 2022, switching places with Yair Lapid. He resigned on 8 November 2022.

== See also ==
- Prime Minister of Israel
- Deputy leaders of Israel
