= Deputy of the Prime Minister of Israel =

Deputy Prime Minister of Israel
- סגן ראש הממשלה
- Emblem of Israel

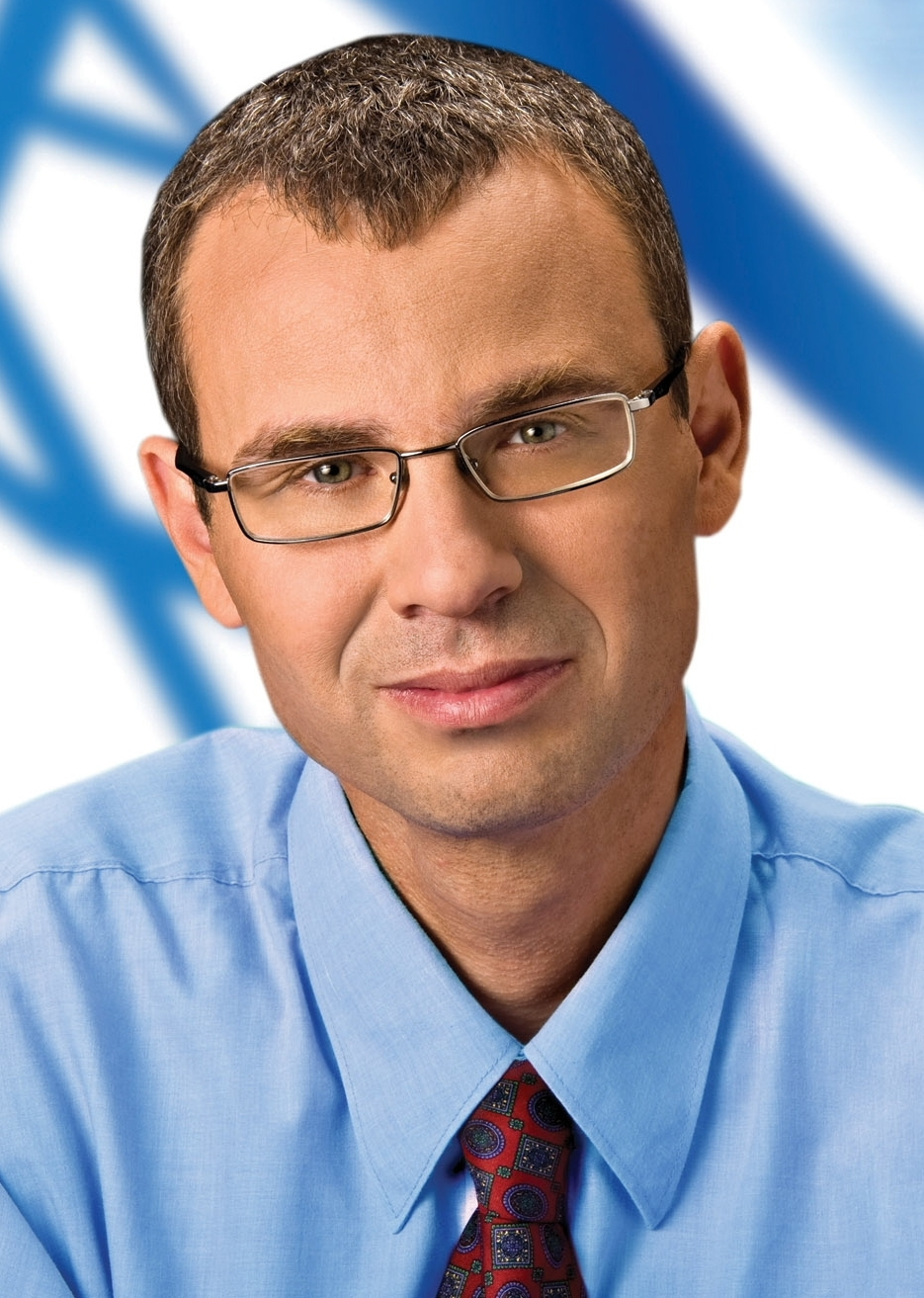
- Incumbent; Yariv Levin since 29 December 2022
- Appointer: Prime Minister
- Term length: No term limit
- Formation: 1952

The deputies of the prime minister of Israel fall into four categories: Acting Prime Minister, Deputy Prime Minister, Vice Prime Minister and Alternate Prime Minister. Vice Prime Minister is an honorary and extra-constitutional position, but entitles the officeholder to a place in the cabinet. Deputy Prime Minister, Designated Acting Prime Minister, and Alternate Prime Minister are constitutional positions.

If the Prime Minister is temporarily incapacitated, both the Acting Prime Minister and the Alternate Prime Minister assume the duties of the prime minister, while the Deputy Prime Minister is an honorary position.

== Deputy Prime Minister ==
The position of Deputy Prime Minister (Hebrew: סגן ראש הממשלה, Segan Rosh HaMemshela) is an honorary title carried by an incumbent Minister in the Israeli Government under the Basic law: the Government, that states the follows: "A minister may be a Deputy Prime Minister" (but no more than that). Thus, there is no limit to the number of deputies a Prime Minister can appoint (as opposed to an Acting Prime Minister, that can only be one).

The post was created in 1963 when Abba Eban was appointed to the position in Levi Eshkol's first government. In 1977 Menachem Begin became the first Prime Minister to have two deputies.

The title was scrapped from 1992 to 1996 during the term of the 13th Knesset, but was resurrected by Benjamin Netanyahu in 1996 when he appointed four Deputies. In Ehud Olmert's cabinet there were three, one from his own party, and the leaders of the two next largest parties in his coalition (Labour and Shas). The former cabinet led by Netanyahu again had four deputy PMs, one from Netanyahu's own Likud party and one each from coalition partners Shas, Independence, and Yisrael Beiteinu. The 36th cabinet, led by Naftali Bennett, had two: Benny Gantz and Gideon Sa'ar.

David Levy has had three spells as Deputy PM; from 1977 until 1992 and then again from 1996 to 1998 and 1999–2000. Each term was with a different party, Likud, Gesher and One Israel respectively.

=== Provision ===
Basic Law: the Government (2001):

- 5. (e) A Minister may be Deputy Prime Minister.

=== List of deputy prime ministers ===
Government	Name	Party	Dates in office
3	Eliezer Kaplan (Note: Died in office)	Mapai	25 June 1952 – 13 July 1952
11–12	Abba Eban	Mapai	26 June 1963 – 12 January 1966
13–17	Yigal Allon	Alignment	1 July 1968 – 10 March 1974
18	Simha Erlikh	Likud	20 June 1977 – 5 August 1981
18	Yigael Yadin	Dash, Democratic Movement, Independent	20 June 1977 – 5 August 1981
19	Simha Erlikh	Likud	5 August 1981 – 19 June 1983
19	David Levy	Likud	3 November 1981 – 10 October 1983
20	David Levy	Likud	10 October 1983 – 13 September 1984
21–23	David Levy	Likud	13 September 1984 – 11 June 1990
21–23	Yitzhak Navon	Alignment	13 September 1984 – 11 June 1990
24	David Levy	Likud	11 June 1990 – 13 July 1992
24	Moshe Nissim	Likud	11 June 1990 – 13 July 1992
27	David Levy	Gesher	18 June 1996 – 6 January 1998
27	Zevulon Hammer	National Religious Party	18 June 1996 – 20 January 1998
27	Rafael Eitan	Tzomet	18 June 1996 – 6 July 1999
27	Moshe Katsav	Likud	18 June 1996 – 6 July 1999
28	Yitzhak Mordechai	Centre Party	6 July 1999 – 30 May 2000
28	David Levy	One Israel	6 July 1999 – 4 August 2000
28	Binyamin Ben-Eliezer	One Israel	6 July 1999 – 7 March 2001
29	Shimon Peres	Labour	7 March 2001 – 2 November 2002
29	Silvan Shalom	Likud	7 March 2001 – 28 February 2003
29	Natan Sharansky	Yisrael BaAliyah	7 March 2001 – 28 February 2003
29	Eli Yishai	Shas	7 March 2001 – 23 May 2002; 3 June 2002 – 28 February 2003
30	Tommy Lapid	Shinui	28 February 2003 – 4 December 2004
30	Silvan Shalom	Likud	28 February 2003 – 15 January 2006
31	Amir Peretz	Labour	4 May 2006 – 18 June 2007
31	Avigdor Lieberman	Yisrael Beiteinu	30 October 2006 – 16 January 2008
31	Shaul Mofaz	Kadima	4 May 2006 – 31 March 2009
31	Eli Yishai	Shas	4 May 2006 – 31 March 2009
31	Ehud Barak	Labour	18 June 2007 – 31 March 2009
32	Avigdor Lieberman	Yisrael Beiteinu	1 April 2009 – 14 December 2012
32	Ehud Barak	Labour, Independence	1 April 2009 – 18 March 2013
32	Dan Meridor	Likud	1 April 2009 – 18 March 2013
32	Eli Yishai	Shas	1 April 2009 – 18 March 2013
36	Gideon Sa'ar	New Hope	13 June 2021 – 9 July 2021
36	Benny Gantz	Blue and White	13 June 2021 – 29 December 2022
37	Yariv Levin	Likud	29 December 2022 –

== Acting Prime Minister ==
The designated Acting Prime Minister (Hebrew: ממלא מקום ראש הממשלה, Memaleh Mekom Rosh HaMemshala lit. "Prime Minister's Place Holder", or "Prime Minister's stand-in") takes the role of Prime Minister as Acting Prime Minister, for up to 100 consecutive days, if the incumbent is temporarily incapacitated. Whilst in other countries the term "Acting Prime Minister" only refers to an individual actually performing the role, in Israel the term is also in use when a designated minister is allocated, even if they never actually perform the role. The incumbent minister must be also a Knesset member to be eligible for this role.

According to the Basic law: the Government, if such a position was not held by any of the incumbent ministers, in the event of the Prime Minister being unable to fulfill their duties temporarily, the cabinet would vote to appoint one of their own members, who is a Knesset member, as Acting Prime Minister for up to 100 consecutive days.

In the 2021 government of Benjamin Netanyahu, there was no designated Acting Prime Minister. Netanyahu appointed one of the ministers from his party as Acting Prime Minister each time he was supposed to undergo a medical procedure under sedation or visits other countries.

There can be only one designated minister appointed to such position. However, the holder of this ministry position can hold other ministerial position, as the most recent designated Acting Prime Minister, Tzipi Livni, was also Minister of Foreign Affairs. Confusingly, the term is sometimes referred to as 'Vice Prime Minister' in English, though a separate and different Vice Prime Minister role already exists. However, the Hebrew titles of the two posts were always distinct, and the official role of Designated Acting Prime Minister is older than the extra-legal, honorary title of Vice Prime Minister. If the Prime Minister is abroad, the designated minister summons the government to cabinet meetings; if there is no such designated minister, in such event, the government will vote for one.

If the Prime Minister wants to replace the designated Acting Prime Minister (usually given to one of the Ministers designated during the forming of the government according to coalition agreements and political needs at the time), he then needs the approval vote of the government and the Knesset. However, the Prime Minister may fire the designated Acting Prime Minister, as he is authorized to fire any minister in his Cabinet.

An Acting Prime Minister will be standing-in for the incumbent (not assume office), acting in the Prime Minister's office, temporarily, and if a designated minister was allocated in advance, automatically, all while the incumbent is in office. However, any Acting Prime Minister will not assume office, automatically (as Interim Prime Minister), after 100 consecutive days, when the Prime Minister, legally, is deemed to be permanently incapacitated, since the "100 consecutive days" was set by law as a limit, not a delegated authority, inasmuch limit for the incumbent to be temporarily incapacitated in office and a limit for the Acting Prime Minister to act in the Incumbent's office.

The aftermath of any event, where the incumbent becomes permanently incapacitated (either declared as such or the "100 consecutive days" limit expired or else), as well as in the event of the incumbent's death or the incumbent was convicted of an offence, are addressed by the law separately. In these cases, the Government that is "deemed to have resigned" to become an interim government, and with the absence of a Prime Minister in office, requires a cabinet vote on one of its members (either the Acting Prime Minister or else) who must be a Knesset member and (from the 2001 law) a member of the Prime Minister's Party as well, to assume office as an Interim Prime Minister, until a new government is placed in power (the 1968 law did not impose time limit on a "temporarily incapacitation" period of the Incumbent Prime Minister, but rather pending the return of the incumbent to resume his duties, and separately addressed only the event of death of the incumbent, while failing to address Permanent incapacitation or criminal conviction of the Incumbent Prime Minister).

Ehud Olmert, after standing-in for Prime Minister Sharon for 100 consecutive days, as acting Prime Minister, did not automatically assume office as an Interim Prime Minister. The Government voted to appoint him, and in addition, he was also a member of Prime Minister's Party, which enabled them to appoint him to the role

Practically, the use of this position started only 1984 during the 11th Knesset, with the first person to hold the position, Yitzhak Shamir, taking office on 13 September 1984. A Coalition deal between the Labour Alignment and Likud stipulated that Shimon Peres would be Prime Minister for the first two years of the Knesset term (out of four years), with Yitzhak Shamir serving as the designated Acting Prime Minister, and then swap places with Shamir for the next two. The major political parties, right-wing Likud party, then headed by Yitzhak Shamir, and Labour, then headed by Shimon Peres, did not gain enough seats in parliament, during the general election, to form a governing majority coalition, which enabled this coalition agreement to take place. The deal was continued into the 12th Knesset, but collapsed in 1990. The role of the designated Acting Prime Minister was limited and unattractive for any chairman of major party aspiring to get the top job.

The position was resurrected in 2003, with Ariel Sharon appointing Ehud Olmert to the post. As designated Acting Prime Minister, Olmert was called to take over the running of the government, following Sharon's stroke in the midst of elections season of early 2006, and continued his role as Acting Prime Minister, after the election were held, and after Sharon & Olmert's Party were designated to form the new government. Days after the election, Sharon reached the 100 consecutive days of Incapacitation (making him legally permanently incapacitated), and then the pre-elections Interim government voted on Olmert to be the Interim Prime Minister, and he fully assumed office as an Interim Prime Minister, just days before forming his own new government, in the aftermath of the election, on 4 May 2006, to become the official Prime Minister. Tzipi Livni then was appointed to the post, in Olmert's Government.

=== Main provisions ===
Basic Law: the Government (2001):

- 5. (d) One of the Ministers who is a member of Knesset may be designated as Acting Prime Minister.
- 16. (a) Should the Prime Minister be absent from Israel, meetings of the Government will be convened and conducted by the designated Acting Prime Minister.
- 16. (b) Should the Prime Minister be temporarily unable to discharge his duties, his place will be filled by the Acting Prime Minister. After the passage of 100 days upon which the Prime Minister does not resume his duties, the Prime Minister will be deemed permanently unable to exercise his office.
- 16. (c) Failing the appointment of a designated Acting Prime Minister, or should the Acting Prime Minister be prevented from fulfilling his duties under sections (a) and (b) above, the Government shall designate another Minister, who is a Knesset Member to exercise that office.
- 20. (b) Should the Prime Minister be permanently incapacitated, the Government shall be deemed to have resigned on the 101st day [100th day midnight] during which the Acting Prime Minister served in his place.
- 30. (c) If the Prime Minister has died, or is permanently incapacitated, from carrying out his duties, or if his tenure was ended because of an offense, the Government shall designate another of the Ministers who is a member of the Knesset and of the Prime Minister's faction to be Interim Prime Minister pending the constitution of the new Government.

=== List of post holders ===
Government	Name	Party	Dates in office
21	Yitzhak Shamir	Likud	13 September 1984 – 20 October 1986
22	Shimon Peres	Labour Alignment	20 October 1986 – 15 March 1990
30	Ehud Olmert	Kadima	28 February 2003 – 14 April 2006
31	Tzipi Livni	Kadima	4 May 2006 – 31 March 2009

== Vice Prime Minister ==
The post of Vice Prime Minister (Hebrew: משנה ראש הממשלה, Mishneh Rosh HaMemshela) is also sometimes referred to as Vice Premier, is an honorary title carried by an incumbent Minister of the Israeli Government, that does not exist under any Israeli law, and has no statutory meaning, which was originally created especially for one of Israeli founding fathers, Shimon Peres.

After Amram Mitzna resigned as head of the Labour Party following the party's defeat in the 2003 elections, Peres was once again appointed as temporary chairman of the party, until a primary for leadership among member of party will be held.

When, in early 2005, Ariel Sharon's right-wing coalition was in trouble due to disagreements over the disengagement plan, Peres led his party into Sharon's coalition for the purpose of supporting the plan. During the coalition negotiations, Peres demanded to be appointed Acting Prime Minister, but was turned down, since the position was already occupied by Ehud Olmert. Labour then demanded that the government change the Basic Law: the Government, in order to enable two acting Prime Ministers at the same time, but received no support for such action.

A compromise was reached by Labour's Haim Ramon, in which Peres received the honorary title of Vice Prime Minister, which included provisions within the agreement, defining his jurisdiction within Sharon's government, but had no legal meaning, as the law regarded Peres and the Vice Prime Minister position as no other than just another title for an incumbent minister within the Israeli government.

Although Peres lost the position when Labour left the government in November 2005, he regained it in May 2006 following his defection to Kadima party and the party's victory in the 2006 elections. However, he resigned from the post on the day he won the election for President in June 2007.

Haim Ramon was appointed to the post in a cabinet reshuffle in July 2007, serving until the end of the Olmert government in March 2009. Silvan Shalom and Moshe Ya'alon were both appointed Vice Prime Minister in the Netanyahu government.

In 2022, Aryeh Deri was appointed Vice Prime Minister. He served until his dismissal in 2023.

=== List of vice prime ministers ===
Government	Name	Party	Term start	Term end
30	Shimon Peres	Labour	10 January 2005	23 November 2005
31	Shimon Peres	Labour	4 May 2006	13 June 2007
31	Haim Ramon	Kadima	4 July 2007	31 March 2009
32	Silvan Shalom	Likud	31 March 2009	18 March 2013
32	Moshe Ya'alon	Likud	31 March 2009	18 March 2013
32	Shaul Mofaz	Kadima	9 May 2012	19 July 2012
34	Silvan Shalom	Likud	14 May 2015	27 December 2015
37	Aryeh Deri	Shas	29 December 2022	24 January 2023

== See also ==
- Basic Law: The Government
