= Ministry of Education (Israel) =

Government ministry of Israel

- משרד החינוך
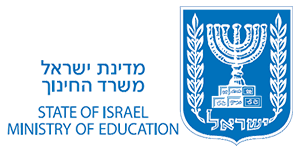
- Ministry seal

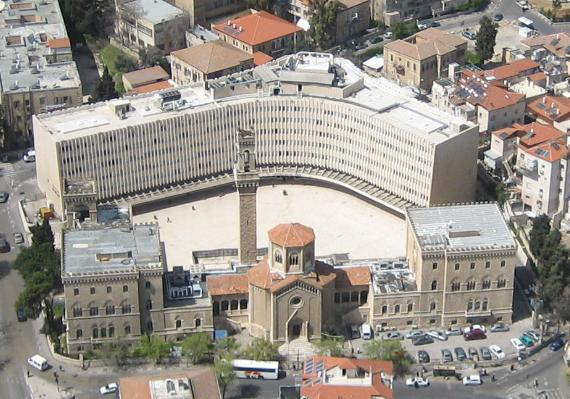
- Ministry of Education Headquarters

Agency overview
- Formed: 1949
- Preceding agencies: Ministry of Education, Culture and Sport; Ministry of Education and Culture
- Jurisdiction: Government of Israel
- Headquarters: Lev Ram Building, Musrara, Jerusalem; 31°47′3.97″N 35°13′26.48″E
- Annual budget: 42 billion New Shekel
- Minister responsible: Yoav Kisch
- Agency executive: Meir Shimoni, General Director
- Website: edu.gov.il

The Ministry of Education (Hebrew: מִשְׂרָד הַחִנּוּךְ, translit. Misrad HaHinukh; Arabic: وزارة التربية والتعليم) is the branch of the Israeli government charged with overseeing public education institutions in Israel. The department is headed by the Minister of Education, who is a member of the cabinet. The ministry has previously included culture and sport, although this is now covered by the Ministry of Culture and Sport.

== History ==
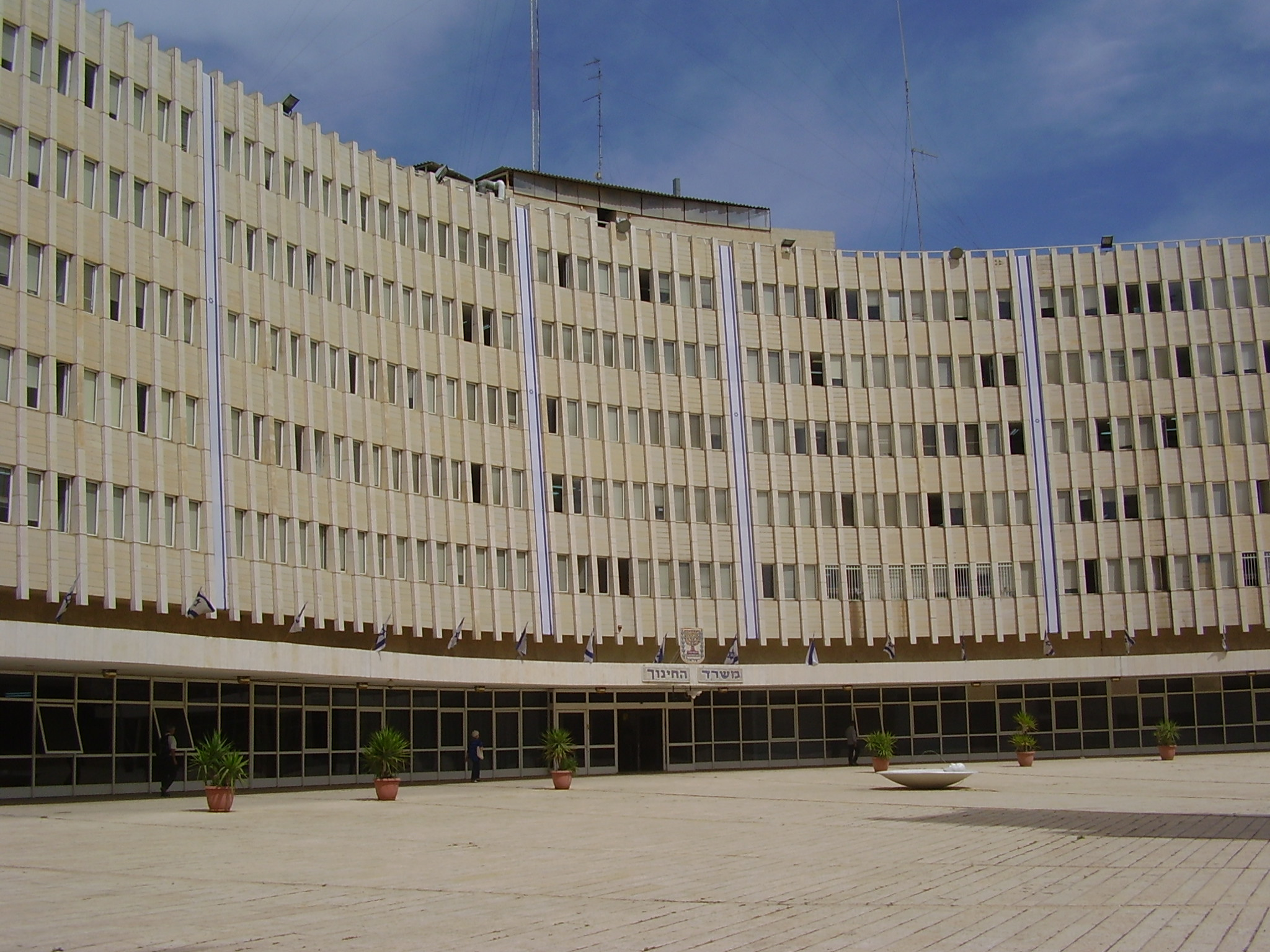
Ministry offices on Street of the Prophets in Jerusalem

In the first decade of statehood, the education system was faced with the task of establishing a network of kindergartens and schools for a rapidly growing student population. In 1949, there were 80,000 elementary school students. By 1950, there were 120,000 - an increase of 50 percent within the span of one year. Israel also took over responsibility for the education of Arab schoolchildren. The first minister of education was Zalman Shazar, later president of the State of Israel. Since 2002, the Ministry of Education has awarded a National Education Award to five top localities in recognizing excellence in investing substantial resources in the educational system. In 2012, first place was awarded to the Shomron Regional Council and followed by Or Yehuda, Tiberias, Eilat and Beersheba. The prize has been awarded to a variety of educational institutions including kindergartens and elementary schools.

=== Activities of organizations in schools ===
In 2013–2014, the Ministry of Education promoted the regulation of the activities of external parties within the state schools, in a dialogue between the Ministry, the local government, parents' representatives, the business sector and philanthropic parties, as part of what was called "the intersectoral round table in the Ministry of Education". As part of the regulation, the Ministry compiled a database of external programs that have some kind of partnership with a representative from the Ministry of Education's headquarters.

In 2019, a petition was filed by pluralist Jewish organizations against the Ministry of Education due to a procedure that reduces by tens of thousands of shekels the support for the activities of these organizations in schools. In April 2021, the High Court invalidated the procedure in question, and even emphasized the importance of implementing the principles of the Shanhar Committee report on the teaching of Judaism in state education. In November 2021 it was announced that the Ministry of Education is not implementing the High Court ruling and that the damage to those organizations continues.

== List of ministers ==
#	Minister	Party	Governments	Term start	Term end	Notes
Minister of Education and Culture
1	Zalman Shazar	Mapai	1	10 March 1949	1 November 1950	
2	David Remez	Mapai	2	1 November 1950	19 May 1951	Died in office
3	David Ben-Gurion	Mapai	2	19 May 1951	8 October 1951	Serving Prime Minister
4	Ben-Zion Dinur	Mapai	3, 4, 5, 6	8 October 1951	3 November 1955	
5	Zalman Aran	Mapai	7, 8, 9	3 November 1955	10 May 1960	
6	Abba Eban	Mapai	9, 10	3 August 1960	26 June 1963	
–	Zalman Aran	Mapai, Alignment	11, 12, 13	26 June 1963	15 December 1969	
7	Yigal Allon	Alignment	15, 16	15 December 1969	3 June 1974	
8	Aharon Yadlin	Alignment	17	3 June 1974	20 June 1977	
9	Zevulun Hammer	National Religious Party	18, 19, 20	20 June 1977	13 September 1984	
10	Yitzhak Navon	Alignment	21, 22, 23	13 September 1984	15 March 1990	
–	Zevulun Hammer	National Religious Party	24	11 June 1990	13 July 1992	
11	Shulamit Aloni	Meretz	25	13 July 1992	11 May 1993	
12	Yitzhak Rabin	Labor	25	11 May 1993	7 June 1993	Serving Prime Minister
Minister of Education, Culture and Sport
13	Amnon Rubinstein	Meretz	25, 26	3 May 1994	18 June 1996	
–	Zevulun Hammer	National Religious Party	27	18 June 1996	20 January 1998	Died in office
14	Yitzhak Levy	National Religious Party	27	25 February 1998	6 July 1999	
Minister of Education
15	Yossi Sarid	Meretz	28	6 July 1999	24 June 2000	
16	Ehud Barak	One Israel	28	24 September 2000	7 March 2001	Serving Prime Minister
Minister of Education, Culture and Sport
17	Limor Livnat	Likud	29, 30	7 March 2001	14 January 2006	
18	Meir Sheetrit	Kadima	30	18 January 2006	4 May 2006	
Minister of Education
19	Yuli Tamir	Labor	31	4 May 2006	31 March 2009	
20	Gideon Sa'ar	Likud	32	31 March 2009	18 March 2013	
21	Shai Piron	Yesh Atid	33	18 March 2013	4 December 2014	
22	Naftali Bennett	The Jewish Home, New Right	34	14 May 2015	2 June 2019	
23	Rafi Peretz	Union of the Right-Wing Parties	34	17 June 2019	17 May 2020	
24	Yoav Gallant	Likud	35	17 May 2020	13 June 2021	
25	Yifat Shasha-Biton	New Hope	36	13 June 2021	29 December 2022	
26	Yoav Kisch	Likud	37	29 December 2022		
