= Rotation government =

Form of coalition government

A rotation government or alternation government is a form of coalition government in which the top office (usually Prime Minister or the equivalent) rotates between coalition members during the parliamentary term pursuant to a pre-agreed schedule. Rotation government often occurs in the context of grand coalitions, where the two largest parties agree to share power.

Israel has seen by far the most experience with such a governing arrangement. The Republic of Ireland is currently under its second consecutive rotation government. Usually, this alternation is guided by constitutional convention with tactical resignation of the first officeholder to allow the second to form a new government. Israel was the first nation to appoint a rotation government in 1984, and a formal constitutional mechanism for rotation government was introduced in 2020. As of 2025, rotation governments have been formed in Ireland, Israel, Malaysia, Mauritius, North Macedonia, Romania, and Turkey. Successful rotations have only taken place in Israel (first with the rotation between Shimon Peres and Yitzhak Shamir, and second with the ascension of Yair Lapid to the office of the Prime Minister of Israel on 1 July 2022, fulfilling the agreement of his coalition government), Ireland (with Leo Varadkar returning as Taoiseach in December 2022), Mauritius (with the rotation between Anerood Jugnauth and Paul Bérenger in September 2003) and Romania (with the rotation between Nicolae Ciucă and Marcel Ciolacu in June 2023); in other cases, the government has collapsed before it could occur.

== Bulgaria ==
The Denkov Government is the 102nd cabinet of Bulgaria. It was approved by the parliament on 6 June 2023, and is a majority coalition of GERB and PP–DB.It is set to be a rotation government, where PP–DB's Nikolai Denkov would start with the premiership, with GERB's Mariya Gabriel serving as deputy prime minister, and after nine months, the two would switch positions. On March 3, Nikolai Denkov resigned the premiership. On 20 March 2024, the planned government rotation and signing of a renewed government manifest for the next nine months had failed. A call for further negotiations to attempt rescuing the failed rotation agreement, was left unmet during March 20–21; but a last final negotiation round began on March 22. The two parties GERB and Movement for Rights and Freedoms concluded on March 24, that the latest negotiation round now also had failed, leaving the President of Bulgaria no other choice than for snap elections to be called.

The Bulgarian constitution declares that after a first failed attempt of government formation, the President must then ask the second-largest party in parliament (PP–DB) to try and form a government; and if this second attempt also fails he shall then give a final third attempt to any remaining party of his choosing. If all three stages of negotiations fail, it is likely that elections would be held on 9 June 2024, coinciding with the European Parliament election on the same day.

PP–DB declared on 26 March, that they would accept giving a second negotiation mandate a try, but it would be limited to a negotiation attempt to form a government together with GERB–SDS that fully respected their original rotation agreement of 2023. The proposed negotiation framework would be for GERB–SDS to sign the reform agreement negotiated with PP–DB, while GERB–SDS nominates a mutually acceptable next Prime Minister, and the current structure of the cabinet has to be preserved. If GERB–SDS by a written letter refused this PP–DB proposal, the second negotiation mandate would immediately be returned unfulfilled to the President. A few hours later, GERB–SDS refused this proposal and called for early elections.

On 29 March, the Bulgarian President Rumen Radev, announced after having concluded a further second and third failed attempt to form a government among the elected parties, that he would now appoint Dimitar Glavchev as a new caretaker prime minister, and meet with him on 30 March to hand over an instruction to form a caretaker government tasked to organise a new early election.

On 5 April, Dimitar Glavchev presented his proposal for the caretaker government, and after consultations being held the same day on whether it could be approved by the representatives of all political parties from the 49th National Assembly, the President announced he would sign a decree on 9 April 2024 approving the caretaker PM and his caretaker government, and at the same time he would sign a decree setting the date for new early elections on 9 June 2024.

== Greek mythology ==
In the writings of Diodorus and the Bibliotheca of Pseudo-Apollodorus, Oedipus's sons Eteocles and Polynices agreed to share the kingship of Thebes, switching each year. When Eteocles's first year as king ended, he refused to give up the kingship, exiling Polynices, who found allies in Argos to retake the city, recounted in the events of Seven Against Thebes.

== Germany ==
After the 2005 German federal election, a rotation government between the CDU and the SPD was considered; under it, then-incumbent SPD Chancellor Gerhard Schröder would have continued to serve until 2007, at which point the CDU's Angela Merkel would take over for the remaining two years. The CDU rejected this and opted for a grand coalition without rotation, with Merkel holding the Chancellery for the entire term.

== Ireland ==
After the 2020 Irish general election a coalition of Fianna Fáil, Fine Gael and the Green Party was formed on 27 June 2020 on the basis of a rotation government. Micheál Martin of Fianna Fáil became Taoiseach with an agreement that Leo Varadkar of Fine Gael would serve as his deputy (Tánaiste) until December 2022, when he would become Taoiseach. The rotation took place on 17 December 2022, with Varadkar sworn in for his second non-consecutive term as Taoiseach, and Martin taking the role of Tánaiste. A similar coalition was agreed after the 2024 Irish general election between Fianna Fáil, Fine Gael and independent politicians, with Martin once again elected Taoiseach on 23 January 2025. Fine Gael party leader Simon Harris, who simultaneously became Tánaiste, would succeed Martin as Taoiseach in November 2027, according to the agreement.

== Israel ==
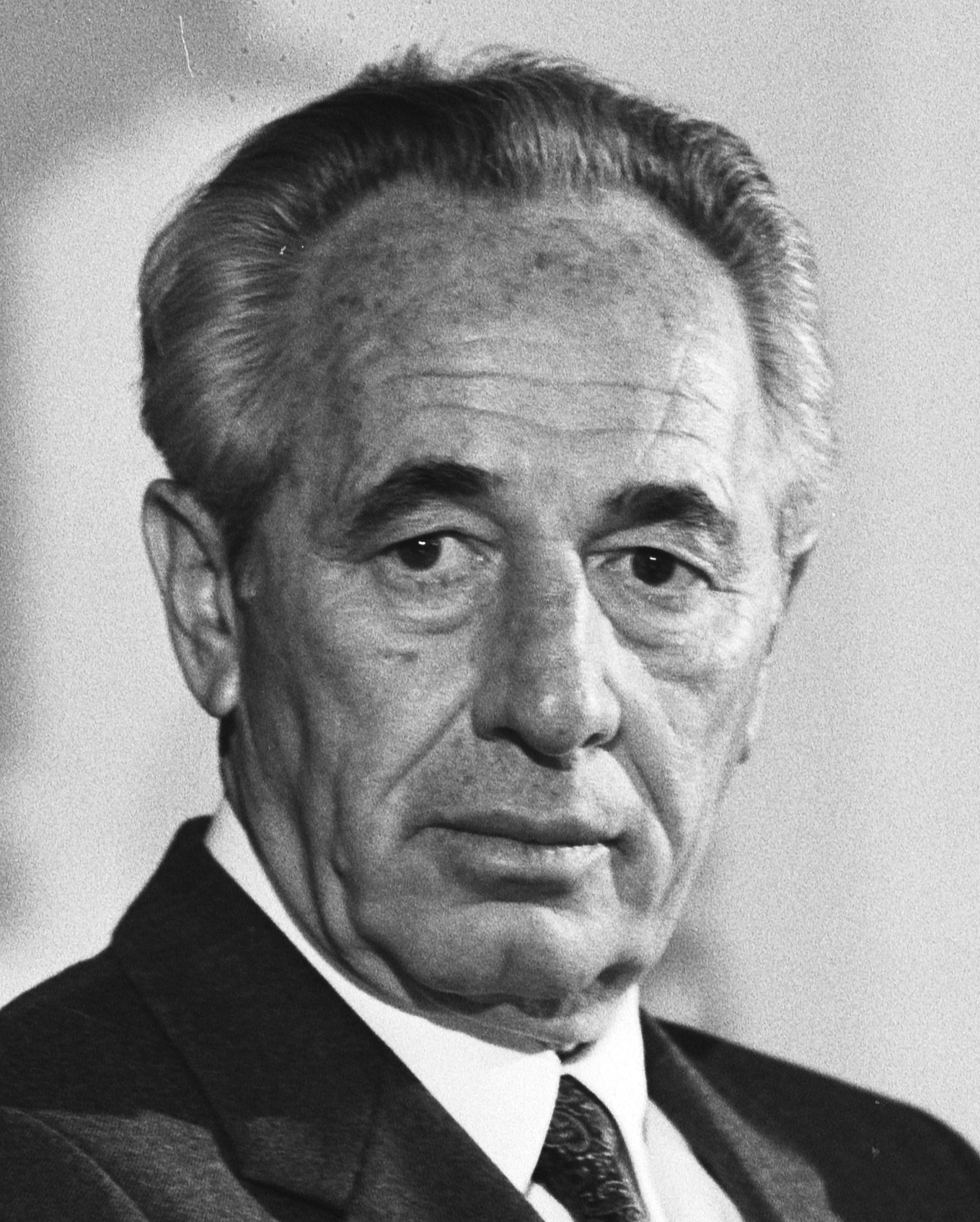
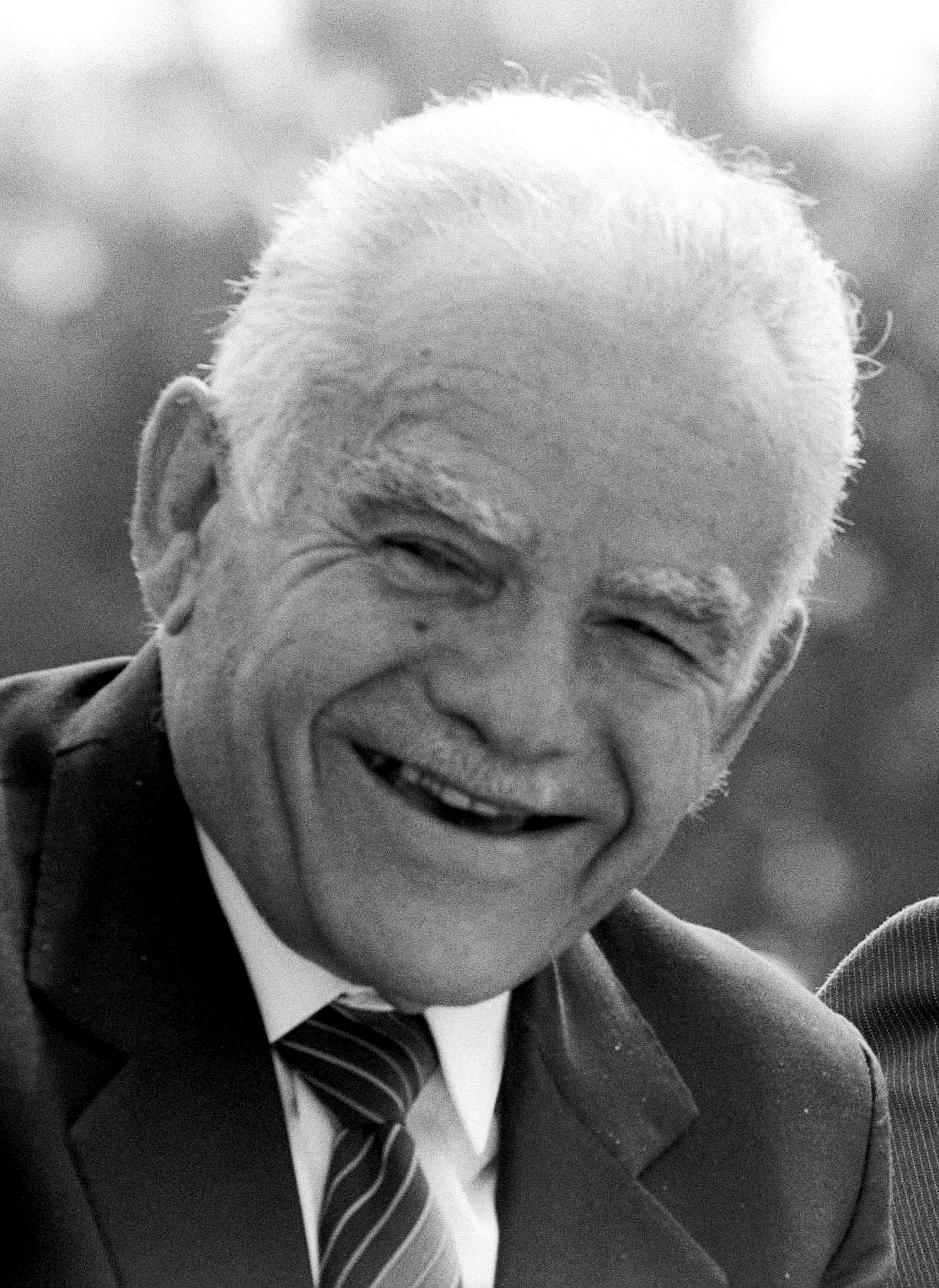
Shimon Peres (Alignment, left) and Yitzhak Shamir (Likud, right) led the world's first rotation government, with both being prime minister in succession. They governed Israel between 1984 and 1988, with Peres leading the 21st government until 1986 and Shamir then leading the 22nd government.

Israel was the first country to employ a rotation government (Hebrew: ממשלת רוטציה memshelet rotatzia) in 1984, following the negotiations for the forming of a grand coalition government after the inconclusive 1984 election. The 1984 rotation deal was non-binding; de jure, the rotation government was two successive governments, one formed in 1984 and headed by Alignment's Shimon Peres and another formed in 1986 and headed by Likud's Yitzhak Shamir, but whose membership and portfolio distribution were otherwise identical. In addition, since the 1984 rotation government was formally two "ordinary" governments, the prime minister could unilaterally dismiss ministers from the alternate prime minister's bloc: In fact, Shimon Peres forced the Likud finance minister, Yitzhak Moda'i, to resign, despite Shamir's objections.

In the 2015 Israeli legislative election, the Zionist Union originally floated the idea of forming an intra-party rotation government between its co-leaders Isaac Herzog and Tzipi Livni, in which Herzog would serve for the first two years and Livni for the second two, though Livni announced on 16 March 2015 that only Herzog would serve as prime minister of a Zionist Union-led government.

The idea of a rotation-based grand coalition again took hold during the 2019–2022 Israeli political crisis and the negotiations for the forming of the 35th Israeli government after the elections to the 23rd Knesset, but unlike in 1984, broad changes in the Basic Law: The Government were made to establish a legally-binding rotation, under a mechanism known as an "alternation government" (Hebrew: ממשלת חילופים memshelet chilufim). Under these changes, the initial prime minister's term automatically expires when the rotation time comes and he swaps positions with the alternate prime minister, without the need to form a de jure new government. Under the law, the alternate prime minister's status is legally entrenched - for example, the prime minister must obtain the approval of the alternate prime minister before removing ministers from the latter's bloc.

The first official alternation government was the 35th Israeli government, with the rotation being made between the Likud (Benjamin Netanyahu) and Blue and White (Benny Gantz). The two parties identified the rotation deal as a central part of their coalition agreement. The High Court of Justice heard a petition (brought by the Movement for Quality Government, Meretz, and others) challenging the Basic Law authorising rotation agreements, but a nine-justice panel decided in 2021 that such agreements do "not amount to the denial of the basic democratic characteristics of the State of Israel" and that the judiciary thus could not intervene.

Under the agreement, Netanyahu was prime minister and Gantz was alternate prime minister. The two were to swap positions on November 17, 2021, after Netanyahu spent 18 months as PM. However, the scheduled rotation never occurred, because the government collapsed after six months, after Netanyahu manoeuvred to sink the passage of the 2020 state budget, triggering new elections in March 2021; the move blocked Gantz from becoming PM.

The 36th Israeli government, a broad-based coalition government of eight parties formed after the 2021 Israeli legislative election, ousted Benjamin Netanyahu as prime minister. As part of the coalition agreement, the parties agreed that Yamina's Naftali Bennett would serve as prime minister of Israel for two years starting in 2021, while Yesh Atid's Yair Lapid was named as alternate prime minister and would take over as PM for two years starting in September 2023. After the coalition lost its majority, leading to its collapse, Bennett and Lapid announced new elections (the fifth Israeli elections in four years) on November 1, 2022. The Knesset formally dissolved on 30 June 2022; on the same day, in accordance with the 2021 agreement, Lapid became prime minister, serving in a caretaker capacity until the elections four months later.

=== Characteristics under the 2020 amendments ===
In an alternation government, as established by the 2020 amendments to Basic Law: The Government, the alternate prime minister was an office held either by a member of the Knesset who was designated to serve as prime minister later in a government or a member of the Knesset who had already served as the prime minister earlier in a government and had since rotated out of that position. The incumbent prime minister and alternate prime minister were sworn in together.

In the following cases, the alternate prime minister replaced the incumbent prime minister:

- the termination of the incumbent prime minister's term.
- the resignation of the incumbent prime minister from the position of prime minister
- the death of the incumbent prime minister.
- the passing of 100 days, in which the incumbent prime minister has been incapacitated for health reasons only.
- the resignation of the incumbent prime minister from the Knesset.

The law stipulated that "the number of ministers identified as having an affinity for the prime minister will be equal to the number of ministers who are identified as having an affinity for the alternate prime minister; However, if the number of ministers shall not be equal, the government will establish a voting mechanism according to which the voting power of all the prime minister-affiliated ministers shall be equal to the voting power of all the alternate-prime minister-affiliated ministers, or rules on how decisions will be taken to ensure such a ratio." The alternate-prime minister would be acting prime minister.

Some of the articles in Basic Law: The Government dealing with the incumbent prime minister also applied to the alternate prime minister, including Article 17(d) which stipulates that the prime minister's term expires upon his conviction in a final judgment on an offence involving moral turpitude. In that situation the alternate prime minister would have replaced him; if the alternate prime minister had the same legal status the government would not be deemed to have resigned.

The amendments which established the alternation government mechanism were repealed in May 2025, with effect from the 26th Knesset.

== Mauritius ==
In the prelude to the 2000 Mauritian general election, Anerood Jugnauth, then-leader of the Militant Socialist Movement, formed an alliance with Mauritian Militant Movement leader Paul Bérenger. The result of the electoral agreement, called the MedPoint deal, between the two parties saw each party share the allocation of tickets for their candidates in the general election equally and, most importantly, the rotation of the premiership between Jugnauth and Bérenger during the course of the government's term.

Under the deal, Jugnauth would serve as prime minister for the first three years of the government and then resign from the position to give way to Bérenger, who would go on to serve the remaining two years in office. In exchange, Bérenger agreed to nominate and support Jugnauth's election to the presidency, an office which is nominally ceremonial. After the MSM/MMM alliance victory in the election, Jugnauth formed his government with Bérenger as deputy prime minister. The deal materialised on 30 September 2003 when Jugnauth submitted his resignation and Bérenger was sworn in as prime minister on the same day. On 7 October 2003, Jugnauth would be elected unanimously as president.

== Malaysia ==
In the campaign for the 2018 Malaysian general election, the then-opposition Pakatan Harapan announced that, if a PH-led government would be formed, Mahathir Mohamad would initially serve as its Prime Minister and secure a pardon for jailed opposition leader Anwar Ibrahim, and that the premiership would be subsequently yielded to Anwar Ibrahim after his release. While Anwar Ibrahim was released from prison on 16 May 2018, the planned rotation did not happen by the time of the collapse of the Mahathir-formed government on 1 March 2020.

Another rotation government was suggested by the King of Malaysia (Yang di-Pertuan Agong), Abdullah of Pahang in the aftermath of the 2022 Malaysian general election which resulted in a hung parliament - with a rotation arrangement between Anwar Ibrahim (Pakatan Harapan) and Muhyiddin Yassin (Perikatan Nasional). However, this was rejected by Muhiyddin and thus Anwar formed a coalition with the remaining parties and coalitions elected to parliament.

== North Macedonia ==
In the campaign for the 2020 North Macedonian parliamentary election, the Democratic Union for Integration made its participation in any coalition contingent on the nominee for Prime Minister being an ethnic Albanian, which both the Social Democratic Union of Macedonia and VMRO-DPMNE have refused. On 18 August, the SDSM and DUI announced that they had reached a deal on a coalition government as well as a compromise on the issue of an ethnic Albanian Prime Minister. Under the deal, SDSM leader Zoran Zaev will be installed as prime minister, and will serve in that position until no later than 100 days from the next parliamentary elections. At that time, the BDI will propose an ethnic Albanian candidate for Prime Minister, and if both parties agree on the candidate, that candidate will serve out the remaining term until the elections.

== Romania ==
=== Ciucă-Ciolacu rotation (2021-2024) ===
Romania's first rotation government was established following the 2021 Romanian political crisis, after negotiations between the Social Democratic Party (PSD), the National Liberal Party (PNL) and the Democratic Alliance of Hungarians in Romania (UDMR). The coalition agreement provided for the office of Prime Minister to rotate between the leaders of the two largest parties midway through the parliamentary term. Nicolae Ciucă (PNL) was designated to serve first, to be succeeded by PSD leader Marcel Ciolacu approximately eighteen months later, from 21 May 2023.

The Ciucă Cabinet took office on 25 November 2021. Besides providing for the rotation of the premiership, the coalition agreement also redistributed several ministerial portfolios and the leadership of Parliament between the governing parties.

The transfer of power, initially expected on 21 may 2023, was delayed amid negotiations over the composition of the succeeding cabinet and the nationwide teachers' strike. Ciucă resigned on 12 June 2023, after which Internal Affairs Minister Cătălin Predoiu served as acting prime minister. During the negotiations, UDMR withdrew from the coalition after failing to reach agreement with PSD and PNL on the allocation of ministries.

Marcel Ciolacu was sworn in as Prime Minister on 15 June 2023, completing the rotation envisaged by the coalition agreement. The new government continued with PSD and PNL as its principal coalition partners for the remainder of the parliamentary term.

=== Bolojan-PSD rotation (2025-2026) ===
Following the 2025 presidential election, President Nicușor Dan nominated Ilie Bolojan (PNL) to form a government supported by the Social Democratic Party (PSD), the National Liberal Party (PNL), the Save Romania Union (USR), the Democratic Alliance of Hungarians in Romania (UDMR) and representatives of the national minorities. As part of the coalition agreement signed on 23 June 2025, the parties adopted a second formal rotation arrangement, providing that a PNL prime minister would serve until April 2027, after which the office would pass to a nominee of the PSD until the end of the parliamentary term.

The Bolojan Cabinet was approved by Parliament on 23 June 2025. Unlike the 2021 agreement, however, the planned rotation was never carried out. In April 2026, PSD withdrew from the governing coalition over disagreements regarding fiscal policy and austerity measures, depriving the government of its parliamentary majority. On 5 May 2026, the cabinet was defeated in a motion of no confidence supported by the PSD and other opposition parties. The fall of the cabinet ended the coalition agreement before the scheduled transfer of the premiership in 2027.

== Turkey ==
The 53rd government of Turkey was planned to be a rotation government between the True Path Party (DYP) and Motherland Party (ANAP), with the premiership alternating between the two parties every year. The vote of confidence was declared invalid by the Constitutional Court as an absolute majority of deputies was not obtained.

The 54th government of Turkey was planned to be a rotation government between the Welfare Party (RP) and DYP. Initially, Necmettin Erbakan of RP was the prime minister and Tansu Çiller of DYP was the deputy prime minister, with the rotation between the two taking place in 1997. When Erbakan resigned to ensure the rotation would take place, president Süleyman Demirel appointed Mesut Yılmaz of ANAP as the new prime minister instead.

== See also ==
- The 1999 Indonesian presidential election (the power sharing pact between Abdurrahman Wahid and Megawati Sukarnoputri)
- The Granita Pact (the Blair–Brown deal)
- A Kirribili Agreement (a Hawke-Keating deal, and a Howard-Costello deal, both of which were not followed)
