= Bachów =

- Village
- Location within Poland
- Coordinates: 49°48′N 22°30′E
- Country: Poland
- Voivodeship: Subcarpathian
- County: Przemyśl
- Gmina: Krzywcza
- Population: 880

Bachów [ˈbaxuf] is a village in the administrative district of Gmina Krzywcza, within Przemyśl County, Subcarpathian Voivodeship, in south-eastern Poland.

== Notable residents ==
- Simha Erlich (1915–1983), Israeli Minister of Finance and Deputy Prime Minister
