= Ministry of Finance (Israel) =

Government ministry of Israel

Ministry of Finance Israel
- משרד האוצר
- Ministry emblem

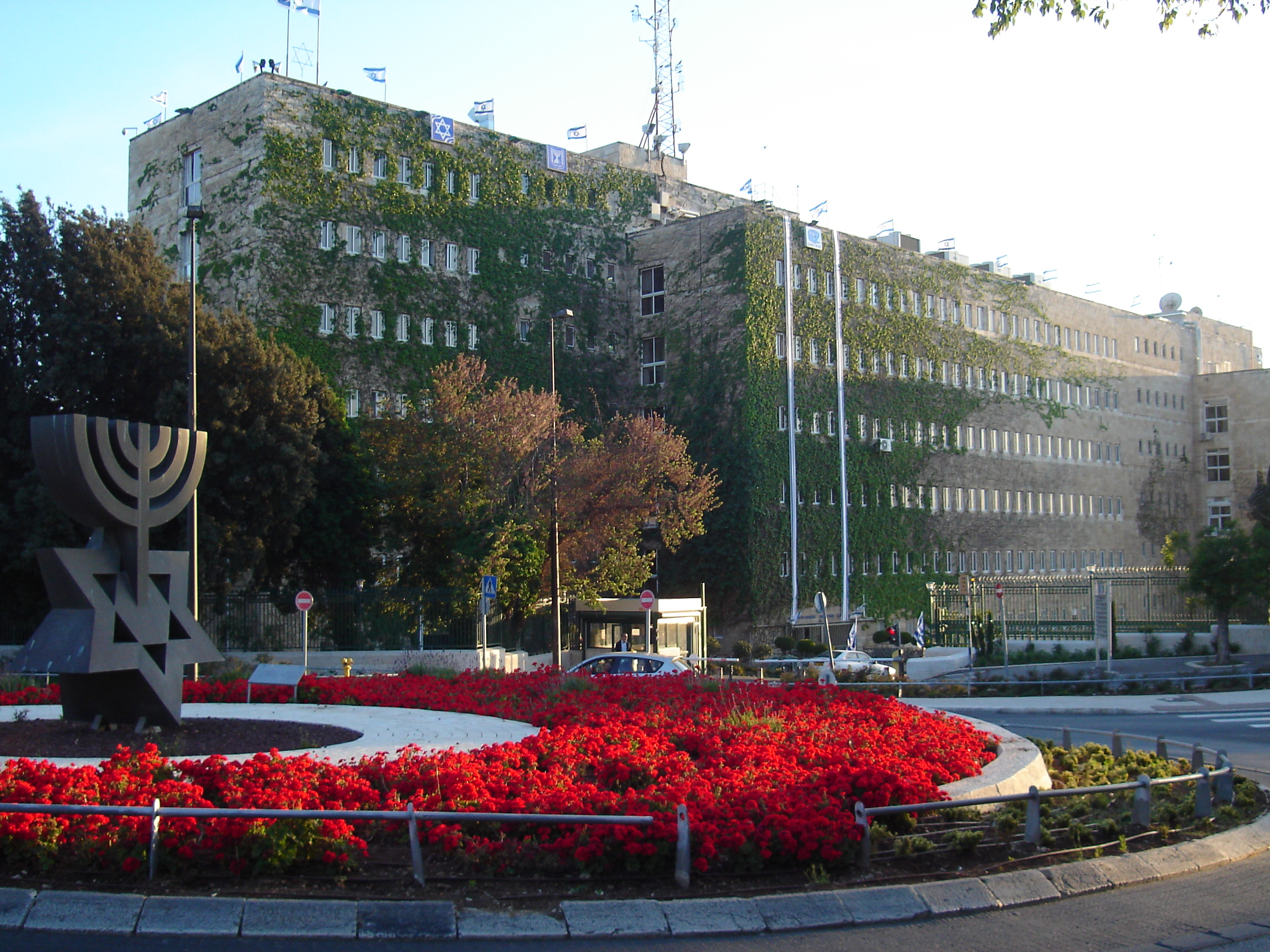
- Ministry of Finance Headquarters

Agency overview
- Formed: 1948
- Jurisdiction: Government of Israel
- Headquarters: Finance Ministry Building, Jerusalem; 31°46′39.72″N 35°12′9.72″E
- Annual budget: 1.96 billion NIS
- Minister responsible: Bezalel Smotrich
- Agency executive: Shlomi Heizler, Director-General
- Child agency: Israel Tax Authority
- Website: mof.gov.il/en

The Israeli Ministry of Finance (Hebrew: מִשְׂרַד הָאוֹצָר, romanized: Misrad HaOtzar) is the main economic ministry of the Government of Israel. It is responsible for planning and implementing the Government's overall economic policy, as well as setting targets for fiscal policy, preparing the draft State Budget and monitoring implementation of the approved budget. The ministry also manages state revenues, collects direct and indirect taxes and promotes nonresident investments. In addition, the ministry conducts economic relations with foreign governments, economic organizations and the international community. The ministry regulates the state owned companies sector and the capital market, savings and insurance. The ministry is also responsible for auxiliary units for government ministries in motor vehicles, computer services, printing and government procurement.

The Finance Ministry is headed by the finance minister, currently Bezalel Smotrich. There is also occasionally a deputy minister of finance. The permanent staff of the ministry include the director general, the department directors responsible for the Budget Department, the accountant general, the Wage and Labor Agreements Department and the accreditation units (the Tax Authority, the Government Companies Authority, the Capital Market, Insurance, and Savings Authority and the Governmental Printer).

== Main functions ==
The units of the Ministry of Finance may be categorized by the three types of service they provide:

- Government staff services – departments that act on behalf of units and operations of the government: budgeting of government operations (Budget Department), operations of the Accountant General, regulation of the state-owned companies (Government Companies Authority), economic services in the United States, and control and auditing of Finance Ministry operations (Internal Audit Unit).
- General economic staff services – departments that act in matters pertaining to the economy at large: management of state revenues (State Revenue Administration), and regulation of the capital market, insurance, and savings (Capital Market, Insurance, and Savings Department). The Tax Authority implements the Income Tax and Property Tax ordinances, Customs, and VAT.
- Auxiliary services for government ministries – motor-vehicle services (Government Vehicle Administration), computer services for the tax departments (Computer Service), printing (the Government Printer, a business enterprise owned by the Ministry of Finance) and Government Procurement Administration.

== List of ministers ==
#	Minister	Party	Government	Term start	Term end	Notes
1	Eliezer Kaplan	Mapai	P, 1, 2, 3	14 May 1948	25 June 1952	
2	Levi Eshkol	Mapai	3, 4, 5, 6, 7, 8, 9, 10	25 June 1952	26 June 1963	
3	Pinchas Sapir	Mapai; Alignment; Labor Party	11, 12, 13	26 June 1963	5 August 1968	
4	Ze'ev Sherf	Alignment	13, 14	5 August 1968	15 December 1969	
–	Pinchas Sapir	Alignment	15, 16	15 December 1969	3 June 1974	
5	Yehoshua Rabinovitz	Alignment	17	3 June 1974	20 June 1977	
6	Simha Erlich	Likud	18	20 June 1977	7 November 1979	
7	Yigal Hurvitz	Likud	18	7 November 1979	13 January 1981	
8	Yoram Aridor	Likud	18, 19, 20	21 January 1981	15 October 1983	
9	Yigal Cohen-Orgad	Likud	20	18 October 1983	13 September 1984	
10	Yitzhak Moda'i	Likud	21	13 September 1984	16 April 1986	
11	Moshe Nissim	Likud	21, 22	16 April 1986	22 December 1988	
12	Shimon Peres	Alignment	23	22 December 1988	15 March 1990	
13	Yitzhak Shamir	Likud	23	15 March 1990	11 June 1990	Serving Prime Minister
–	Yitzhak Moda'i	New Liberal Party	24	11 June 1990	13 July 1992	
14	Avraham Shochat	Labor Party	25, 26	13 July 1992	18 June 1996	
15	Dan Meridor	Likud	27	18 June 1996	20 June 1997	
16	Benjamin Netanyahu	Likud	27	20 June 1997	9 July 1997	Serving Prime Minister
17	Yaakov Neeman	Likud	27	9 July 1997	18 December 1998	
–	Benjamin Netanyahu	Likud	27	18 December 1998	23 February 1999	Serving Prime Minister
18	Meir Sheetrit	Likud	27	23 February 1999	6 July 1999	
–	Avraham Shochat	One Israel	28	6 July 1999	7 March 2001	
19	Silvan Shalom	Likud	29	7 March 2001	28 February 2003	
–	Benjamin Netanyahu	Likud	30	28 February 2003	9 August 2005	
20	Ehud Olmert	Likud; Kadima	30	9 August 2005	7 November 2005	
21	Avraham Hirschson	Kadima	31	4 May 2006	22 April 2007	
–	Ehud Olmert	Kadima	31	22 April 2007	4 July 2007	Serving Prime Minister
22	Roni Bar-On	Kadima	31	4 July 2007	31 March 2009	
23	Yuval Steinitz	Likud	32	31 March 2009	18 March 2013	
24	Yair Lapid	Yesh Atid	33	18 March 2013	2 December 2014	
–	Benjamin Netanyahu	Likud	33	2 December 2014	14 May 2015	Serving Prime Minister
25	Moshe Kahlon	Kulanu, Likud	34	14 May 2015	17 May 2020	
26	Israel Katz	Likud	35	17 May 2020	13 June 2021	
27	Avigdor Lieberman	Yisrael Beiteinu	36	13 June 2021	29 December 2022	
28	Bezalel Joel Smotrich	Religious Zionist	37	29 December 2022		

=== Deputy ministers ===
#	Minister	Party	Government	Term start	Term end
1	Yitzhak Coren	Mapai	10	30 May 1962	26 June 1963
2	Zvi Dinstein	Alignment; Labor Party; Alignment	13, 14	24 July 1967	15 December 1969
–	Zvi Dinstein	Alignment	15	22 December 1969	10 March 1974
3	Yehezkel Flomin	Likud	18	28 June 1977	30 July 1979
4	Haim Kaufman	Likud	19, 20	28 August 1981	13 September 1984
5	Adiel Amorai	Alignment	21, 22	24 September 1984	22 December 1988
6	Yossi Beilin	Alignment	23	26 December 1988	11 June 1990
7	Yosef Azran	Shas	24	2 July 1990	13 July 1992
8	Rafael Pinhasi	Shas	25	4 August 1992	31 December 1992
9	David Magen	Likud	27	18 June 1996	20 May 1997
10	Nissim Dahan	Shas	28	5 August 1999	11 July 2000
11	Yitzhak Cohen	Shas	29	2 May 2001	20 May 2002
–	Yitzhak Cohen	Shas	29	3 June 2002	28 February 2003
–	Yitzhak Cohen	Shas	32	1 April 2009	18 March 2013
12	Mickey Levy	Yesh Atid	33	18 March 2013	4 December 2014
–	Yitzhak Cohen	Shas	34, 35	19 May 2015	14 October 2020

== See also ==
- Economy of Israel
- Bank of Israel
- Standard of living in Israel
