= Simha Erlich =

Israeli politician (1915–1983)

- שמחה ארליך
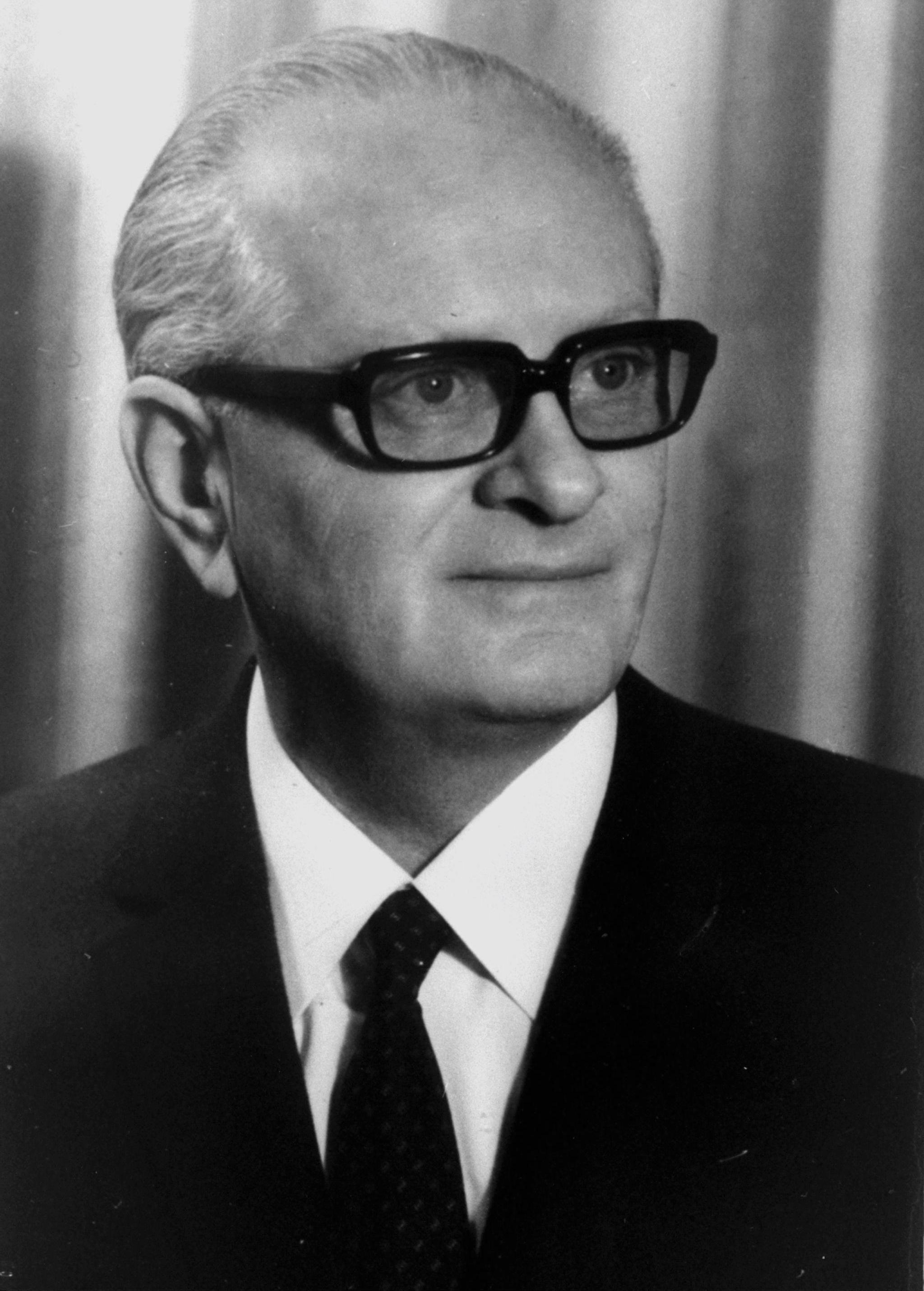

Ministerial roles
- 1977–1979: Finance Minister
- 1977–1983: Deputy Prime Minister
- 1981–1983: Agriculture Minister

Faction represented in the Knesset
- 1969–1974: Gahal
- 1974–1983: Likud

Personal details
- Born: 15 December 1915; Bachowa, Austria-Hungary (today Poland)
- Died: 19 June 1983 (aged 67)

Simha Erlich (Hebrew: שמחה ארליך; 15 December 1915 – 19 June 1983) was an Israeli politician. Erlich was leader of the Liberal Party and served in the Knesset from 1969 to 1983. Erlich notably served as Minister of Finance under Prime Minister Menachem Begin, where he was known for his efforts to liberalize the Israeli economy, and also served as Deputy Prime Minister of Israel.

== Early life and career ==
Erlich was born on 15 December 1915 in the village of Bachów, then part of the Kingdom of Galicia and Lodomeria in Austria-Hungary (now part of modern Poland). He was a member of the General Zionists youth movement.

He made aliyah to Mandatory Palestine in 1938 and settled in Nes Ziona, where he worked as a farmer. He studied optics and founded a lens factory.

== Political career ==
In 1955, he was elected to Tel Aviv city council, and became a member of the Liberal Party. In 1969, he quit the city council and was elected to the Knesset on the Gahal list (Gahal being a coalition between the Liberal Party and Herut). In 1976, he was elected chairman of the Liberal Party.

After the 1977 elections, he was appointed Finance Minister and Deputy Prime Minister. As Minister of Finance, he tried sought to liberalise the Israeli economy by abolishing foreign currency regulations and travel taxes, as well as cheapening imported goods. In 1978, Erlich presented a budget that he predicted would reduce the country's deficit.

It soon turned out that Israel's economy was not prepared for such a drastic change, as could be seen by the subsequent deterioration of the balance of payments, the mass increase of goods import and sharp rise of inflation rate.

Consequently, Erlich was forced to resign as Minister of Finance. However, he remained Deputy Prime Minister and was in charge of the development of the Galilee, the Arab sector and re-absorption of emigrants.

After the 1981 elections, Erlich was appointed Agriculture Minister and remained Deputy Prime Minister.

== Death ==
Erlich died on 19 June 1983 at the age of 67 after heart bypass surgery and was buried in Nachalat Yitzhak Cemetery.
