= Ministry of Economic Strategy =

Former government ministry of Israel

- משרד הכלכלה והתכנון
- Emblem of Israel

Agency overview
- Formed: 1981
- Dissolved: 1995
- Jurisdiction: Government of Israel

The Economic Strategy Ministry (Hebrew: המשרד לאסטרטגיה כלכלית, HaMisrad LeAstrategia Kalkalit) was a ministry in the Israeli cabinet.

== List of ministers ==
#	Minister	Party	Government	Term start	Term end	Notes
Minister of Economics and Inter-Ministry Coordination
1	Ya'akov Meridor	Likud	19, 20	August 5, 1981	September 13, 1984	
2	Gad Yaacobi	Alignment	21, 22	September 13, 1984	September 16, 1984	
Minister of Economics and Planning
2	Gad Yaacobi	Alignment	21, 22	September 16, 1986	October 20, 1988	
3	Yitzhak Moda'i	Likud	23	December 22, 1988	June 11, 1990	
4	David Magen	Likud	24	June 11, 1990	July 13, 1992	
5	Shimon Shetreet	Labor Party	25	July 13, 1992	July 18, 1995	
6	Yossi Beilin	Labor Party	25	July 18, 1995	November 22, 1995	
Minister of Economic Strategy
7	Benjamin Netanyahu	Likud	32	March 31, 2009	March 18, 2013	Serving Prime Minister
