= Zalman Aran =

Israeli politician (1899–1970)

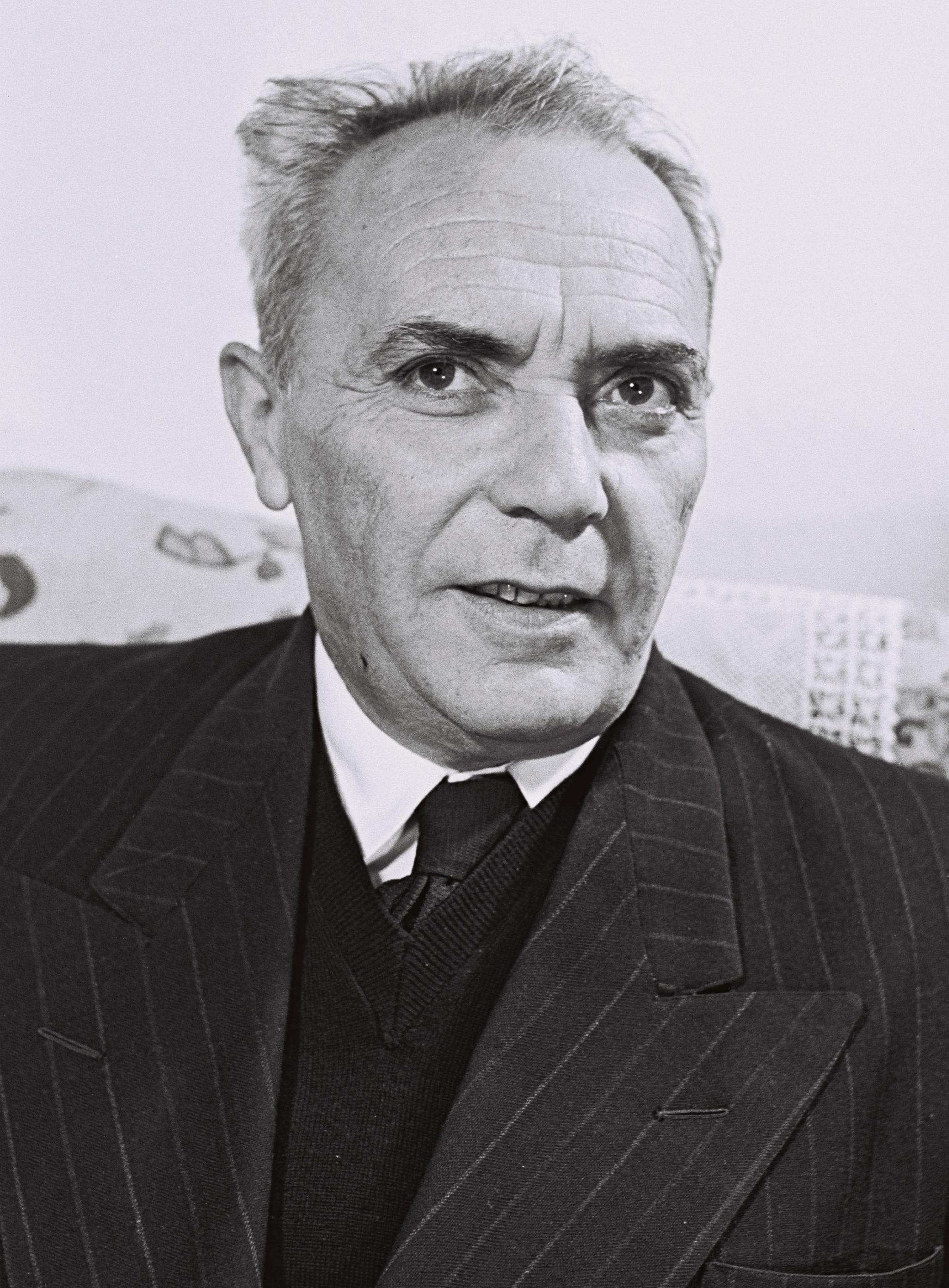

Ministerial roles
- 1954–1955: Minister without Portfolio
- 1955: Minister of Transportation
- 1955–1960: Minister of Education
- 1963–1969: Minister of Education

Faction represented in the Knesset
- 1949–1965: Mapai
- 1965–1968: Alignment
- 1968–1969: Labor Party
- 1969: Alignment

Personal details
- Born: 1 March 1899 Yuzovka, Russian Empire
- Died: 6 September 1970 (aged 71)

Zalman "Ziama" Aran (Hebrew: זלמן "זיאמה" ארן; 1 March 1899 – 6 September 1970) was a Zionist activist, educator and Israeli government minister.

== Biography ==
Born Zalman Aharonowitz in Yuzovka in the Yekaterinoslav Governorate of the Russian Empire (now Donetsk, Ukraine), Aran received a religious education in a heder. He later studied agriculture in Kharkov. In his youth, he was active in Tze'irei Zion, a Zionist youth movement. In 1917 he became a member of its Self-Defense Organization Committee. He worked as a teacher and a statistician from 1918 to 1923. In 1920, after the party split, he joined the Zionist Socialists. He was a member of its Central Committee from 1924 to 1925.

In 1926, he immigrated to Mandatory Palestine, where he joined the Ahdut HaAvoda Party. He worked in building and road construction.

== Political career ==
In 1930, after Ahdut HaAvoda merged into Mapai, he was appointed the new party's General Secretary in Tel Aviv. From 1936 to 1947 he worked in the Histadrut Executive Committee as Treasurer and Director of the Information Department, and was one of the founders of the School for Histadrut Activists. He also became a member of the Zionist Executive Committee in 1946 and a member of its Presidium in 1948.

In 1949 he was elected to the Knesset, and was re-elected in 1951, 1955, 1959, 1961 and 1965. He chaired the Foreign Affairs and Defense Committee, and was also a member of the House Committee. In 1953 he was appointed Minister without Portfolio and, in 1954, Minister of Transportation. From 1955 to 1960 and again from 1963 to 1969, he was Minister of Education and Culture.

As Israel's Minister of Education, he introduced "Jewish Identity" and Jewish tradition into the curriculum and promoted the expansion of technical education. In 1955, the Knesset accepted his reform program for the Israeli education system and his demands for a secondary education diploma, as well as extension of Israel's compulsory Education Law to the ages of 14 to 16. He also promoted the integration of children from different backgrounds into the same schools to accelerate Israel's melting-pot ideal and cut down socio-economic gaps in the Israeli society, including recreational activities for development town residents.

As a government minister in 1967, he initially supported the majority position which sought a diplomatic solution to Egypt's closure of the Straits of Tiran, rather than a pre-emptive strike, which he also felt posed a great risk to the home front and the Israeli Air Force. He also opposed the occupation of East Jerusalem.

== Commemoration ==
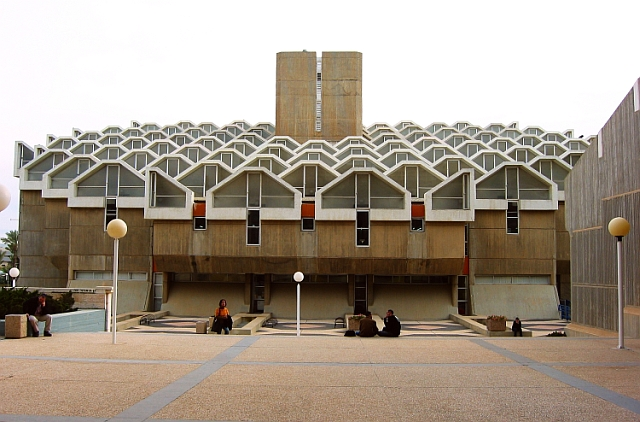
Zalman Aran Library, Ben Gurion University of the Negev

The Tel Aviv University School of History and the central library of the Ben-Gurion University of the Negev were named after him, as were several schools in Israel.

== Published works ==
- חבלי חינוך [Trials of Education and implementation] (in Hebrew). 1971. OCLC 19165694.
- אוטוביוגרפיה [Autobiography] (in Hebrew). 1971. OCLC 19165722.
- חזית וחזות [Front and the appearance] (in Hebrew). 1972. OCLC 19165666.
