= Yosef Shapira =

Israeli politician

Ministerial roles
- 1984–1988: Minister without Portfolio

Personal details
- Born: 26 December 1926 Jerusalem, Mandatory Palestine
- Died: 28 December 2013 (aged 87) Jerusalem, Israel

Yosef "Yoske" Shapira (Hebrew: יוסף "יוסקה" שפירא; 26 December 1926 – 28 December 2013) was an Israeli politician and educator who served as Minister without Portfolio between 1984 and 1988, although he was never a member of the Knesset.

Born in Jerusalem during the Mandate era, Shapira was amongst the leadership of Bnei Akiva and the National Religious Party. He died in 2013 and was buried in Segula Cemetery.
