= Aryeh Nehemkin =

Israeli politician (1925–2021)

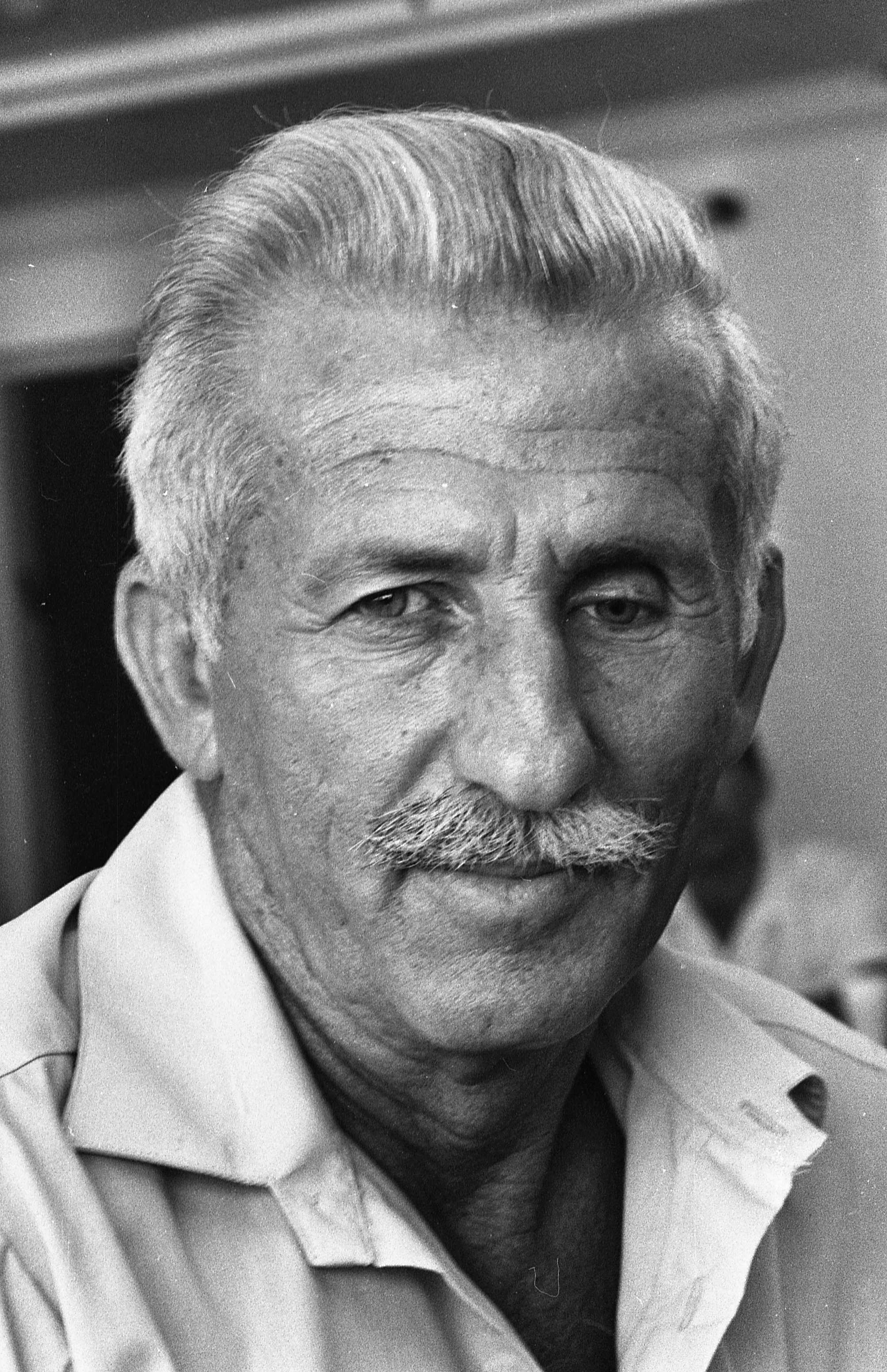
- Nehemkin in 1983

Ministerial roles
- 1984–1988: Minister of Agriculture

Faction represented in the Knesset
- 1981–1988: Alignment

Personal details
- Born: 2 November 1925 Nahalal, Mandatory Palestine
- Died: 24 November 2021 (aged 96)

Aryeh Nehemkin (Hebrew: אריה נחמקין; 2 November 1925 – 24 November 2021) was an Israeli politician. He served as a member of the Knesset for the Alignment from 1981 until 1988, and as Minister of Agriculture between 1984 and 1988.

== Biography ==
Nehemkin was born in Nahalal during the Mandate Era. He was a Haganah member between 1943 and 1948. During the 1948 Arab-Israeli War he served in the IDF, reaching the rank of lieutenant colonel. Nehemkin was a member of the Economic Committee of the Moshavim Movement in 1959-60, becoming the co-ordinator of its economic section between 1965 and 1967, before serving as the movement's secretary between 1970 and 1981.

In 1981 he was elected to the Knesset on the Alignment's list. He was re-elected in 1984, and was appointed Minister of Agriculture in the national unity government. He lost his seat in the 1988 elections.

Nehemkin died on 24 November 2021 at the age of 96, and was buried in Nahalal Cemetery.
