= Adiel Amorai =

Israeli politician (born 1934)

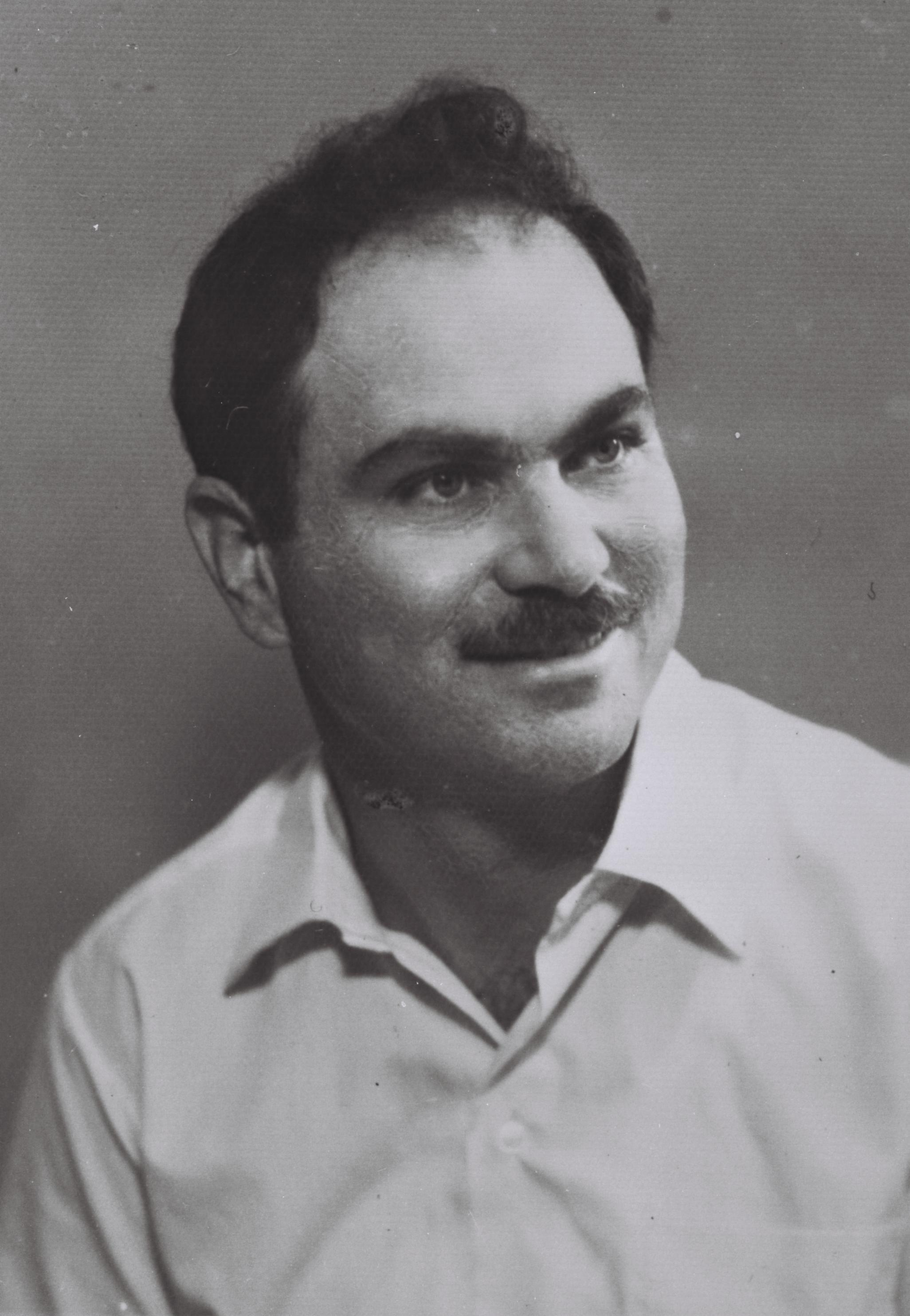
- Amorai in 1969

Faction represented in the Knesset
- 1969–1988: Alignment

Personal details
- Born: 17 February 1934 (age 92) Rehovot, Mandatory Palestine

Adiel Amorai (Hebrew: עדיאל אמוראי; born 17 February 1934) is an Israeli former politician who served as a member of the Knesset for the Alignment between 1969 and 1988.

== Biography ==
Born in Rehovot during the Mandate era, Amorai was educated at Municipal High School A in Tel Aviv, before studying economics, international relations and public administration at the Hebrew University of Jerusalem. He later worked as director of the Ministry of the Interior and as its spokesman.

In 1969 he was elected to the Knesset on the Alignment list. He was re-elected in 1973, 1977, 1981 and 1984, and on 24 September 1984 was appointed Deputy Minister of Finance. He resigned from the Knesset on 31 October 1988, and was replaced by Uri Sebag.
