= Rafael Pinhasi =

Israeli politician (born 1940)

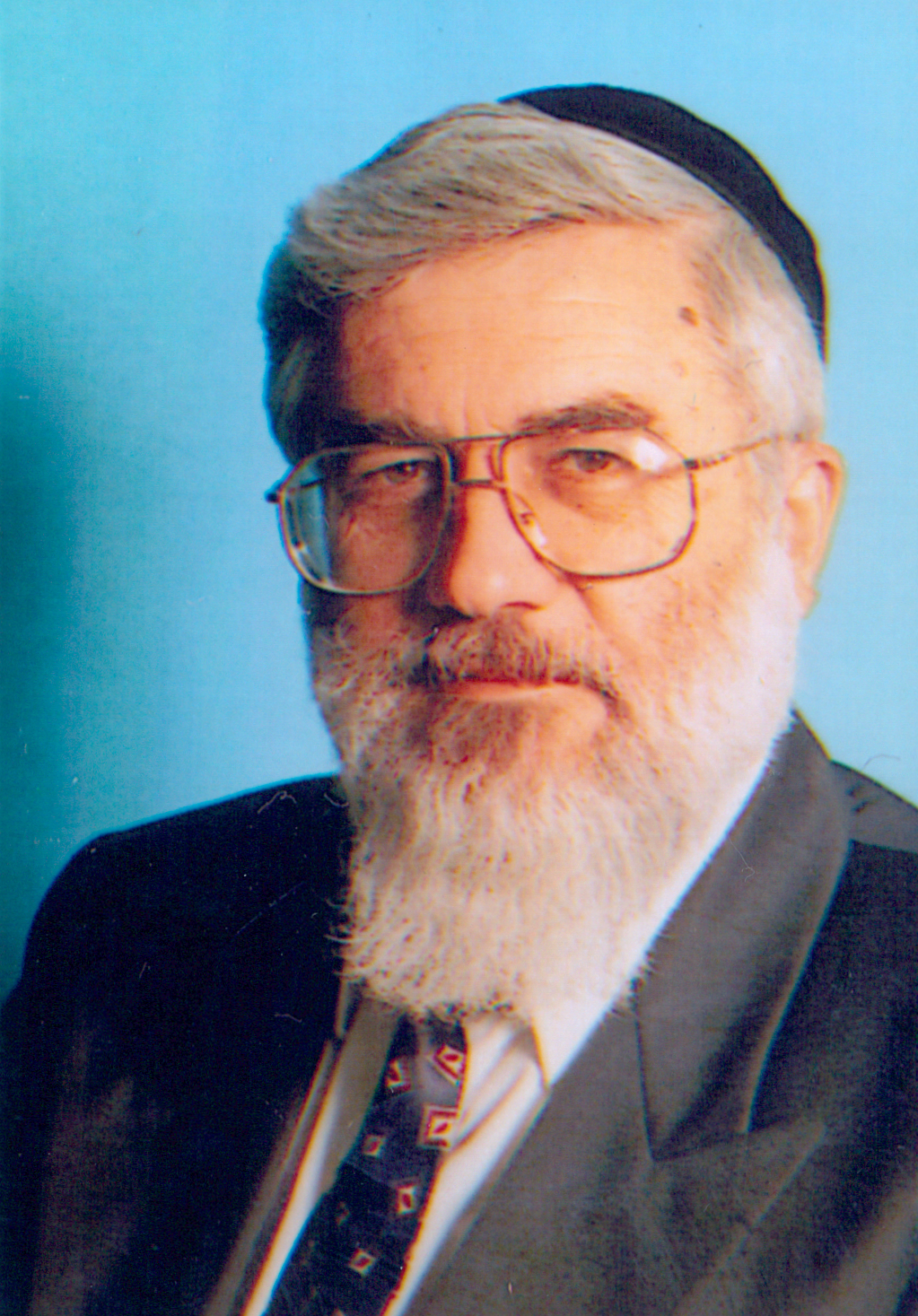

Ministerial roles
- 1990–1992: Minister of Communications

Faction represented in the Knesset
- 1984–1999: Shas

Personal details
- Born: 1940 (age 85–86) Kabul, Afghanistan

Rafael Pinhasi (Hebrew: רפאל פנחסי; born 1940) is an Israeli former politician who served as Minister of Communications between 1990 and 1992.

== Biography ==
Pinhasi was born in Kabul in Afghanistan; his family migrated there from Bukhara in the 1930s. They later emigrated to Israel in 1950. He was amongst the founders of Shas, and served as deputy mayor of Bnei Brak.

In 1984 he was elected to the Knesset on Shas's list, and in December 1985, he was appointed Deputy Minister of Labor and Social Welfare. He retained his seat in the 1988 elections, and became a Deputy Speaker of the Knesset. In January 1990, he was appointed Deputy Internal Affairs Minister, and in June that year, he became Minister of Communications, serving until the 1992 elections.

As Communications Minister, he was criticized for granting operating licenses to communications entities owned by his associates. However, he was also credited with opening the telephone market, previously dominated by Bezeq, to competition. Pinhasi granted new licenses for last-mile infrastructure, international calling, satellite communications, etc.

He retained his seat in the election, and was appointed Deputy Minister of Finance in August, holding the post until he became Deputy Minister of Religious Affairs. He was forced to resign from the cabinet by the High Court of Justice in September 1993 after being convicted for making false declarations, a crime deemed to be of "moral turpitude".

Re-elected in 1996, Pinhasi lost his seat in the 1999 elections. In 2008, he was appointed chairman of the Tel Aviv cemeteries council.

== See also ==
- List of Israeli public officials convicted of crimes or misdemeanors
