= Gad Yaacobi =

Israeli politician (1935–2007)

- גד יעקבי
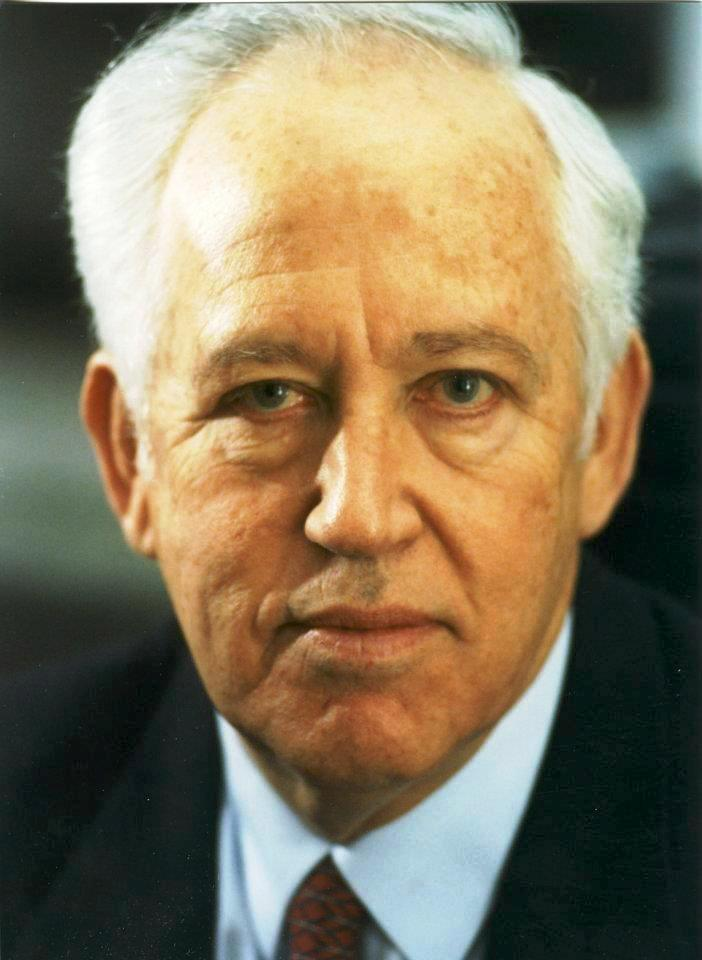

Ministerial roles
- 1974–1977: Minister of Transportation
- 1984: Minister of Economics and Inter-Ministry Co-ordination
- 1986–1988: Minister of Economics & Planning
- 1987–1990: Minister of Communications

Faction represented in the Knesset
- 1969–1991: Alignment
- 1991–1992: Labor Party

Personal details
- Born: 18 January 1935 Kfar Vitkin, Mandatory Palestine
- Died: 27 August 2007 (aged 72)

Gad Yaacobi (Hebrew: גד יעקבי; 18 January 1935 – 27 August 2007) was an Israeli Minister, Alignment Knesset member, and Israel Ambassador to the United Nations.

== Biography ==
Yaacobi was born in Kfar Vitkin during Mandate era, where he completed his high-school studies. His academic studies were economics and political science at the Tel Aviv University.

From 1960 to 1961 he served as an assistant to the Agriculture Minister of Israel, and from 1961 to 1966 as head of the Center for Planning and Economic Development in the Agriculture Ministry, appointed by Moshe Dayan.

In 1965 Yaacobi was among the founders of the Rafi party. When Rafi merged into the Labor Party (which formed part of the alliance known as the Alignment), he was appointed to the party's bureau. In the 1969 election, he was elected to the Knesset, and in 1972 was appointed Deputy Transportation Minister. In 1974 he was appointed Transportation Minister by Prime Minister Yitzhak Rabin, a position he held until the 1977 election. In 1984, in the joint Alignment – Likud government, Yaacobi served as Minister of Economy and Planning until 1987, when he was appointed Minister of Communications – a position he held again in the 23rd Israeli government, from 1988 to 1990.

After not being elected to the 13th Knesset, Yaacobi was appointed Ambassador to the United Nations (September 1992 – June 1996). Upon his return to Israel, he was appointed chairman of the Israel Electric Corporation, a position he held until 1998, and in 2000 he was appointed chairman of the Israel Ports and Railways Authority. He also served as a lecturer at Tel-Aviv University and at the Interdisciplinary Center in Herzlia, and in the management of several non-profit organizations.

Yaacobi published 15 books, among them three for children, and two of poetry. He also wrote articles for several periodicals.
