= Ya'akov Tzur =

Israeli politician (born 1937)

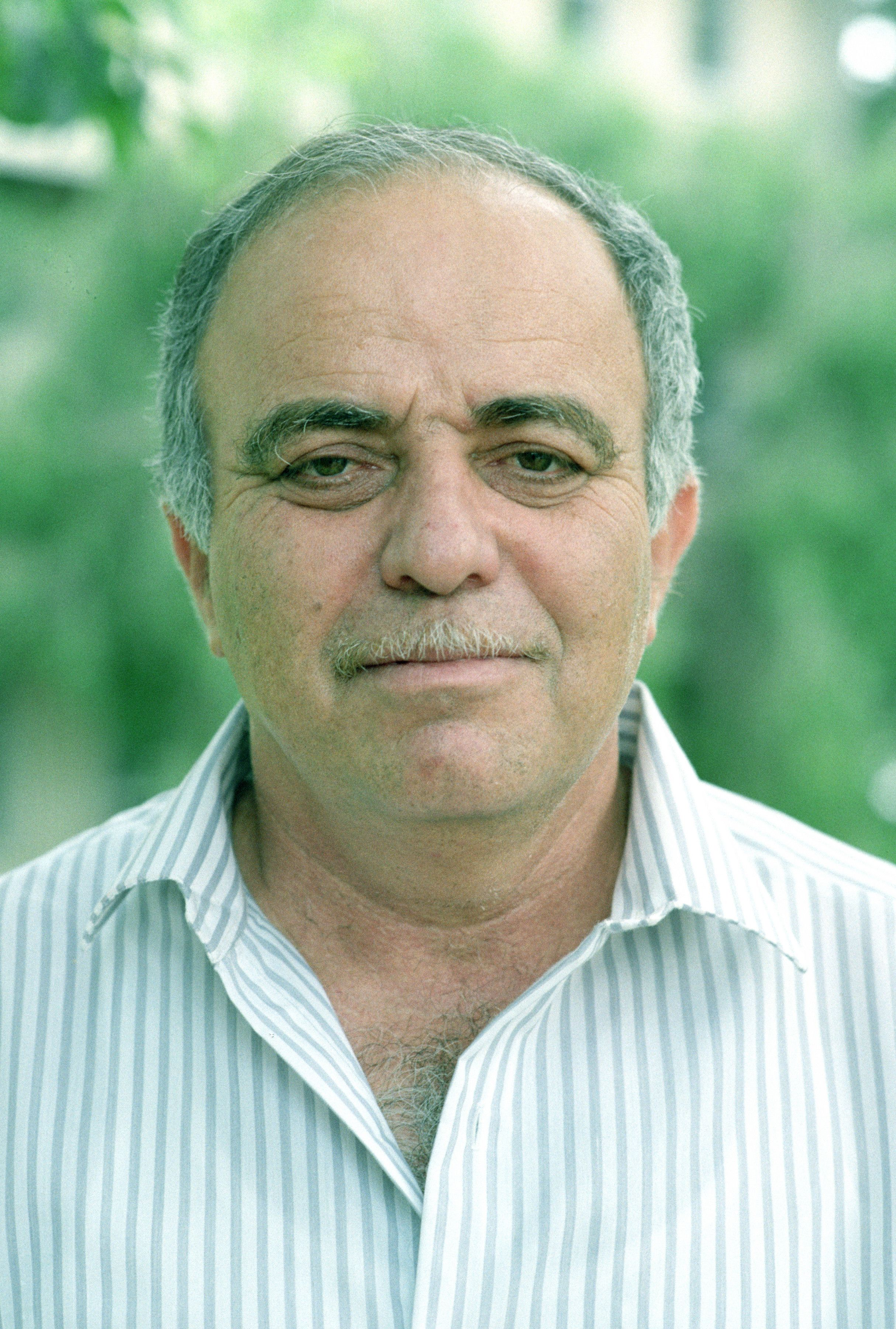
- Tzur in 1992

Ministerial roles
- 1984–1988: Minister of Immigrant Absorption
- 1988–1990: Minister of Health
- 1992–1996: Minister of Agriculture

Faction represented in the Knesset
- 1981–1991: Alignment
- 1991–1992: Labor Party

Personal details
- Born: 4 April 1937 (age 89) Haifa, Mandatory Palestine

Ya'akov Tzur (Hebrew: יעקב צור; born 4 April 1937) is an Israeli former politician who held several ministerial portfolios in the 1980s and 1990s.

== Biography ==
Born Ya'akov Steinberg in Haifa during the Mandate era, Tzur studied bible and history at the Hebrew University of Jerusalem. Between 1955 and 1957 he was part of the Yotvata settlement group, and in 1957 became a member of kibbutz Netiv HaLamed-Heh. He worked as a teacher in schools in Givat Brenner and Kfar Menachem, before serving as director of the education department of HaKibbutz HaMeuhad between 1972 and 1974. In 1976 he became the movement's secretary, overseeing its 1979 merger into the United Kibbutz Movement (of which he served as secretary until 1981).

In 1981 he was elected to the Knesset on the Alignment list. Re-elected in 1984, he was appointed Minister of Immigrant Absorption. Following the 1988 elections he became Minister of Health, serving until the Alignment withdrew from the government in March 1990.

Although he lost his seat in the 1992 elections, he was appointed Minister of Agriculture in Yitzhak Rabin's government, serving until 1996.
