= Moshe Nissim =

Israeli politician (born 1935)

- משה נסים
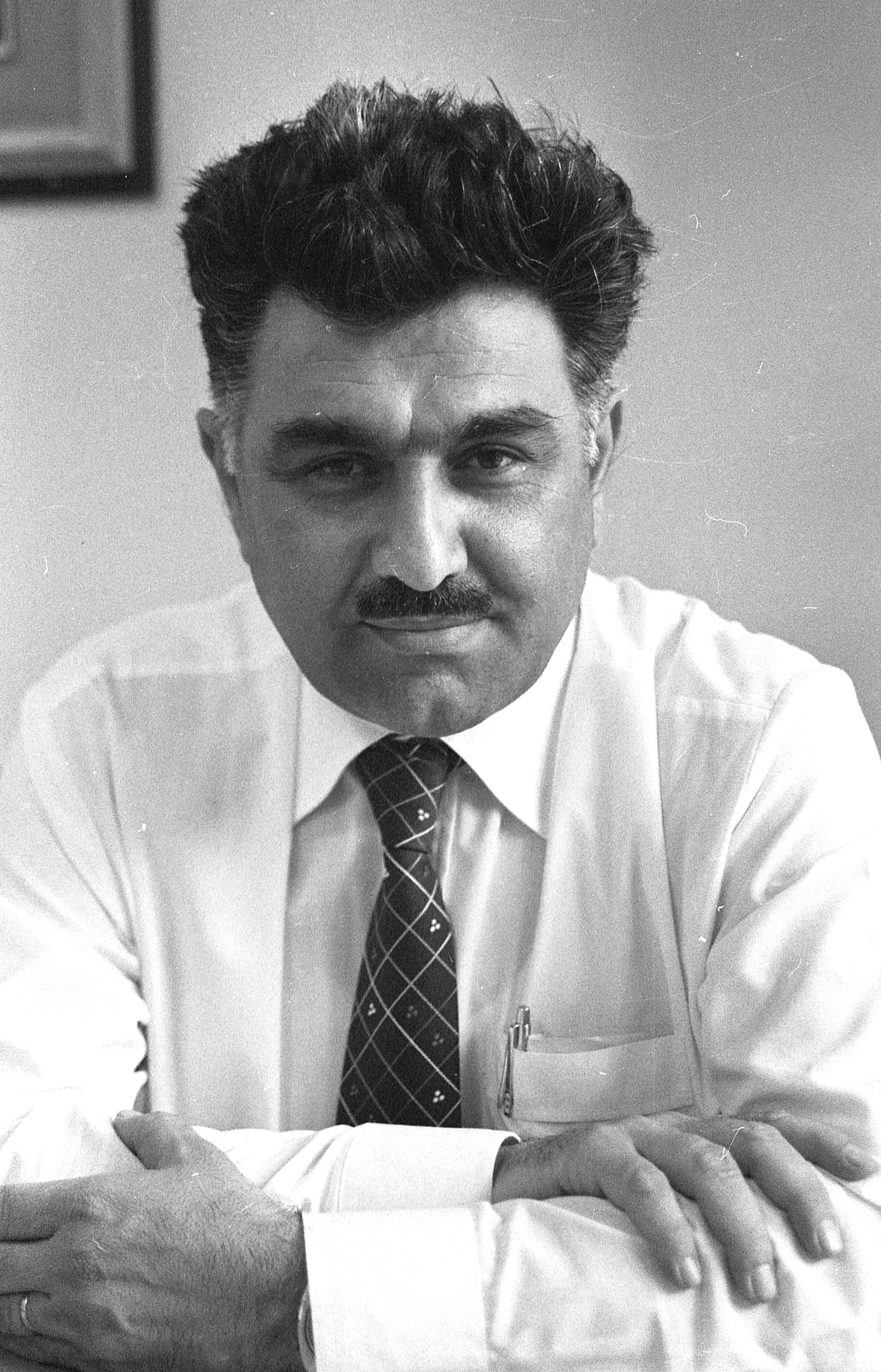

Ministerial roles
- 1978–1980: Minister without Portfolio
- 1980–1986: Minister of Justice
- 1986–1988: Minister of Finance
- 1988–1990: Minister without Portfolio
- 1990–1992: Minister of Industry and Trade
- 1990–1992: Deputy Prime Minister

Faction represented in the Knesset
- 1959–1961: General Zionists
- 1961: Liberal Party
- 1969–1974: Gahal
- 1974–1996: Likud

Personal details
- Born: 10 April 1935; Jerusalem, Mandatory Palestine

Moshe Nissim (Hebrew: משה נסים; born 10 April 1935) is a former Israeli politician, minister and Deputy Prime Minister.

== Biography ==
Moshe Nissim was born in Jerusalem. He studied law at the Hebrew University of Jerusalem and served as an Officer of Justice in the Israel Defense Forces during his national service. He is the son of Rabbi Isaac Nissim, who served as Sephardi Chief Rabbi of Israel from 1955 to 1973.

== Political career ==
Nissim was first elected to the Knesset in 1959 as a member of the General Zionists. However, he lost his seat in the 1961 elections, and did not reappear in the Knesset until 1969, when he was elected on the list of Gahal (a merger of Herut, the General Zionists and the Progressive Party). In 1973 Gahal became Likud, with Nissim serving as the party's parliamentary chairman between 1973 and 1977.

Following Likud's victory in the 1977 election, Nissim was appointed Minister without Portfolio in Menachem Begin's government in January 1978. He became Minister of Justice in August 1980, a role he retained until April 1986 when he became Minister of Finance.

Following the 1988 elections he reverted to being a Minister without Portfolio, before being appointed Minister of Industry and Trade in March 1990. In June 1990 he was also made Deputy Prime Minister.

He lost his place in the cabinet after Likud lost the 1992 elections, and left the Knesset in 1996.

In 2017, Prime Minister Benjamin Netanyahu appointed Nissim to lead an overhaul of the conversion system in Israel. Nissim proposed removing control of it from ultra-Orthodox-dominated Rabbinate, creating a new state-run Orthodox authority instead. Ultimately, the idea was rejected "due to ultra-Orthodox and national religious opposition."
