= Meridor =

Meridor is a surname. Notable people with the surname include:

- Dan Meridor (born 1947), Israeli politician
- Eliyahu Meridor (1914–1966), Israeli lawyer and politician, father of Dan and Sallai; not related to Ya'akov
- Liora Meridor, née Robin (1947–2023), Israeli economist, wife of Dan Meridor
- Sallai Meridor (born 1955), Israeli politician
- Ya'akov Meridor (1913–1995), pre-state underground commander, later Israeli politician and businessman
