= Shaul Meridor =

Israeli politician

- שאול מרידור
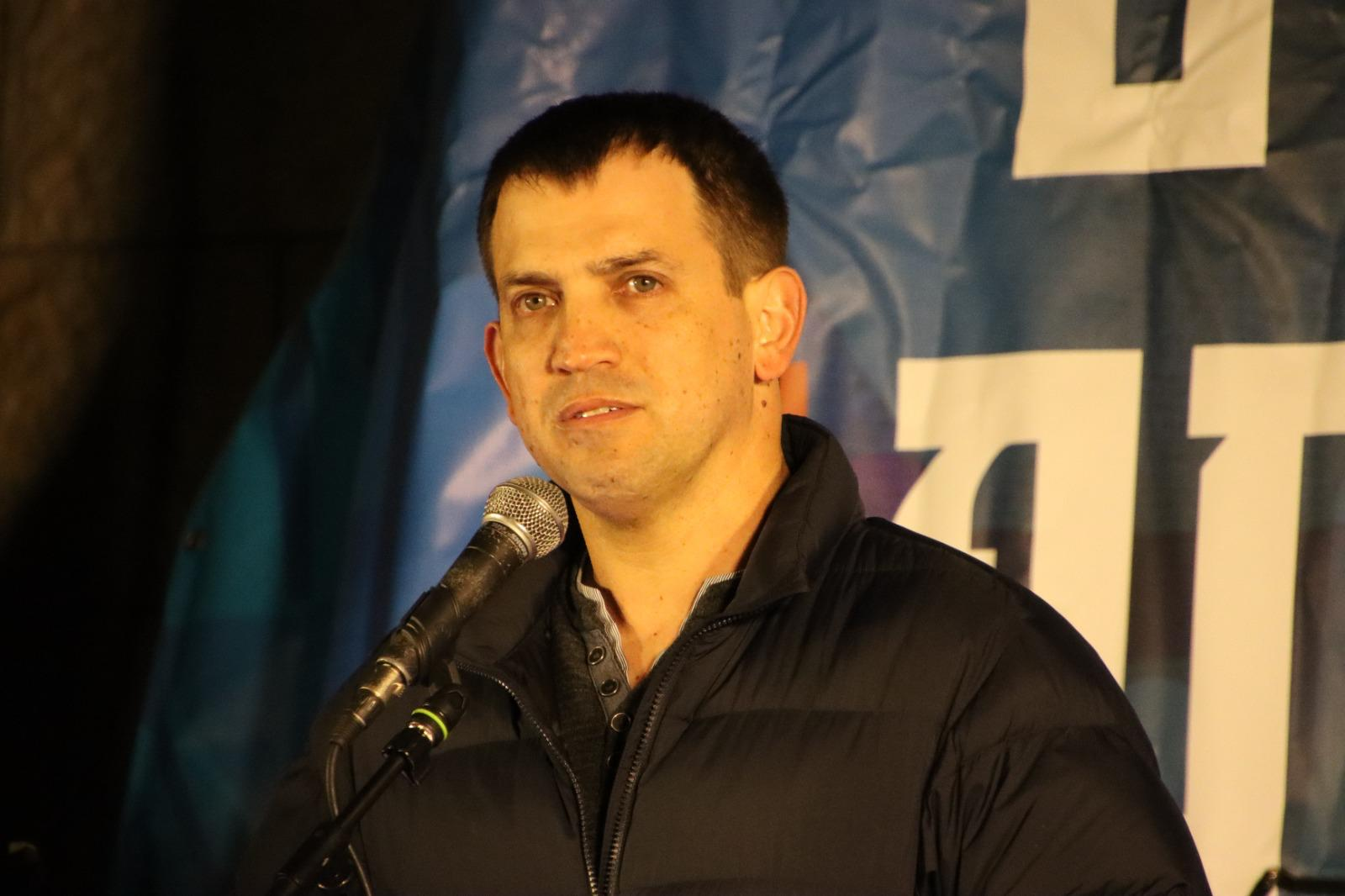
- Meridor in 2025

Faction represented in the Knesset
- 2026–: Yashar

Other roles
- 2015–2017: Director-General of the Ministry of Energy
- 2017–2020: Head of the Budget Department of the Ministry of Finance

Personal details
- Born: 17 June 1976 (age 50) Jerusalem, Israel
- Party: Yashar (since 2026)
- Spouse: Yael Meridor
- Children: 4
- Parent(s): Dan Meridor (father); Liora Meridor (mother)
- Relatives: Eliyahu Meridor (paternal grandfather); Yair Hurvitz (uncle); Sallai Meridor (uncle); Eli Hurvitz (cousin)
- Education: Hebrew University of Jerusalem
- Occupation: Economist • Civil servant

Shaul Meridor (Hebrew: שאול מרידור; born 17 June 1976) is an Israeli politician and Member of Knesset for Yashar. Before being elected, he served as the head of the Budget Division at the Ministry of Finance, director-general of the Ministry of Energy and chief financial officer of Lightricks.

== Early life ==
Shaul Meridor was born on 17 June 1976 to Dan Meridor who would go on to hold several ministerial positions, and economist Liora Meridor. He has two brothers and a sister.

In 1994, Meridor graduated from high school in Jerusalem. In 2002, Meridor graduated from the Hebrew University of Jerusalem with a bachelor of arts in philosophy, politics and economics.

== Public service ==
In 2013, he became deputy budget commissioner overseeing the infrastructure sector, including energy, water, transportation, and agriculture. During the 32nd government under finance minister Yuval Steinitz, Meridor managed the work of the Sheshinsky Committee which promoted reforms in the electricity and gas sectors, and also helped push for the "Open Skies" reform among water corporations.

Meridor worked at the Ministry of Finance's Budget Department between 2002 and 2013, last working as the Deputy Budget Director for Infrastructure. In 2013, he became deputy budget commissioner overseeing the infrastructure sector, including energy, water, transportation, and agriculture. During the 32nd government under finance minister Yuval Steinitz, Meridor managed the work of the Sheshinsky Committee which promoted reforms in the electricity and gas sectors, and also helped push for the "Open Skies" reform among water corporations.

He later worked for a renewable energy company, before being appointed Director General of the Ministry of Energy in 2015 by minister Yuval Steinitz. Meridor served until 2017, when, he was appointed Director of the Ministry of Finance's Budget Department by Finance Minister Moshe Kahlon. He resigned as Budget Director in 2020 on the grounds that Minister Israel Katz frequently ignored recommendations from the Ministry's professional staff and had instructed the staff to violate long-standing norms related to the formulation of the 2020 budget.

Following his resignation, Meridor became vocal in his criticism of prime minister Benjamin Netanyahu and in support of government accountability. During the 2023 Israeli judicial reform protests, he was one of the speakers during a protest rally in Tel Aviv in May 2023.

== Political career ==
In April 2026, Meridor announced that he will be joining the Yashar party led by Gadi Eisenkot.

On 10 November 2026, he was sworn in as a member of Israel's 26th Knesset.

== Business career ==
In 2013, he entered the private market. He served as CEO of GreenEnergy Renewable Energies for a period of about six months.

In May 2021, Meridor became the chief financial officer at Lightricks.

== Personal life ==
Medior resides in Jerusalem. He is married and has four children.
