= Israel Tax Authority =

Taxation authority of Israel

- רשות המסים בישראל; Rashut HaMisim B'Israel
- Logo

Agency overview
- Formed: 1 September 2004; 22 years ago
- Preceding agencies: Income Tax and Real Estate Tax Department; Customs and VAT Division; Computerised Processing Service
- Headquarters: Daniel Tower, Jaffa Road 236, Jerusalem, Israel
- Employees: 5,500
- Agency executive: Eran Yaacov, Director
- Parent agency: Ministry of Finance
- Website: taxes.gov.il

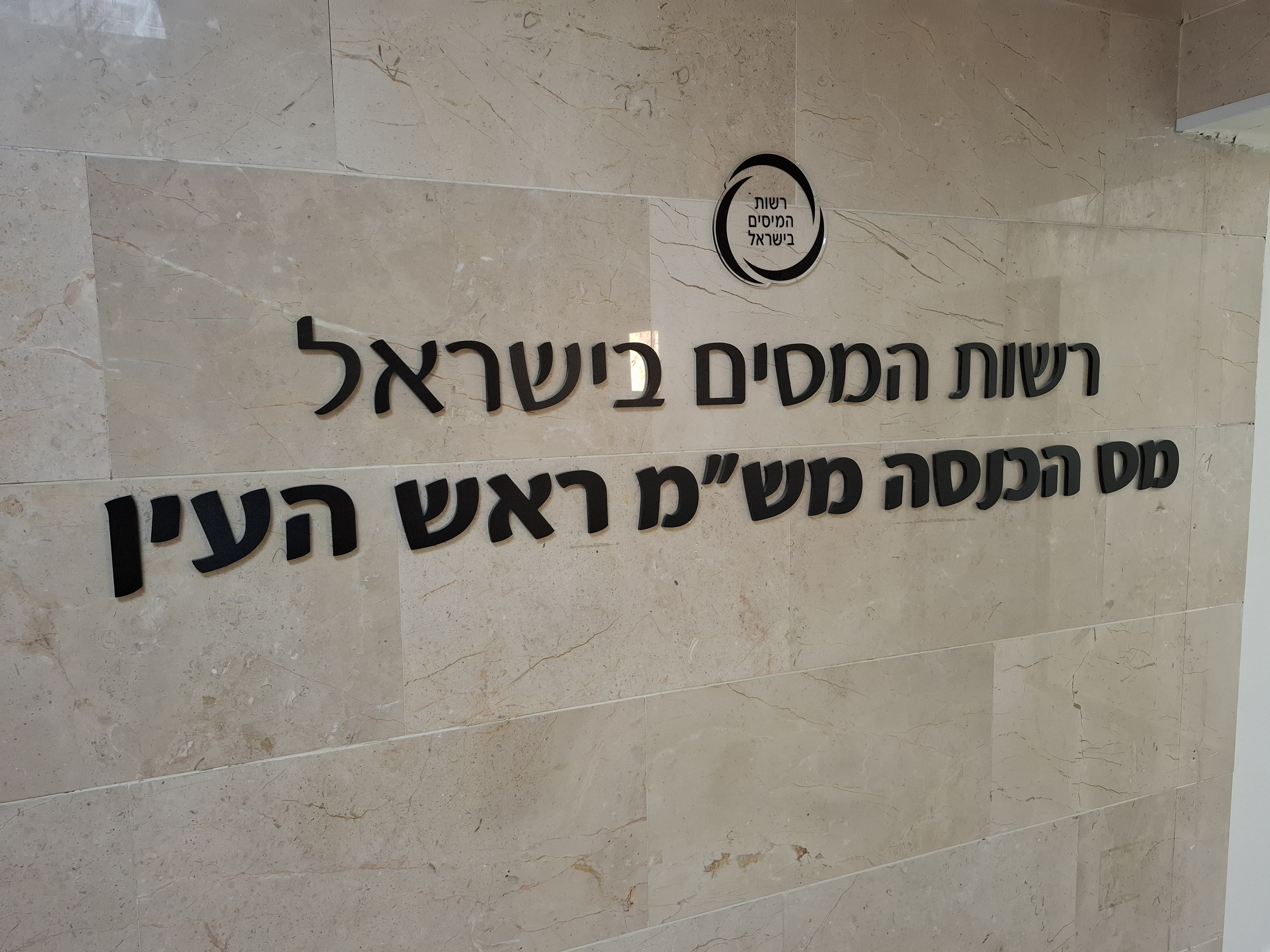

The Israel Tax Authority (Hebrew: רשות המסים בישראל, romanized: Rashut HaMisim B'Israel) is the taxation authority in Israel. It is an agency of the Ministry of Finance.

The Authority was established on 1 September 2004, following a decision by the Government of Israel to merge the tax collection divisions: the Income Tax and Real Estate Tax Department, the Customs and VAT Division and the Computerised Processing Service. The aim was "to consolidate the management of tax collection under one head manager and to authorize it by law to implement the relevant tax law". The authority employs about 5,700 people.

== See also ==
- Taxation in Israel
