= Pensions in Israel =

Overview of the pension system in Israel

Pensions in Israel consist of a state old age pension system, a private pension system which employees are legally required to participate in and that is supervised and regulated by the government, and a pension system for civil servants.

== State old age pensions ==
The state-run old age pension system is administered by Bituah Leumi (National Insurance Institute). All residents aged 18 or older are required by law to pay insurance contributions to Bituach Leumi as part of the old age insurance system. One must have paid contributions for at least 12 years to be able to claim a pension.

Upon reaching retirement age and claiming the pension, contributors are means-tested, with those above certain income levels entitled to only a partial pension or no pension at all until age 70. The basic old age pension is NIS 1,531 per month for an individual. In the case of a couple where one of them is not eligible for an old age pension, the pension is NIS 2,301, composed of the pension for an individual with an increment for the spouse. Upon reaching age 80, this increases to NIS 1,617 for an individual and NIS 2,387 for a couple. A seniority increment is added to the basic pension, calculated according to the years of insurance contributions accumulated up to a maximum of 50% of the basic pension. Additional increments are available to pensioners living with dependent spouses and children, as well as those who are entitled to no pension or only a small pension which the pensioner must waive to receive the increment. Pensioners who have no other sources of income are entitled to income supplements to ensure a minimal standard of living. Health insurance contributions are deducted at rates of NIS 196 for individual pensions and NIS 283 for a couple's pension. Those entitled to income supplements also have NIS 103 deducted from them monthly.

Old age pensions are paid via bank transfers on the 28th of every month.

== Private pension system ==
All salaried employees not covered by collectively-bargained pension plans between employers and labor unions are legally required to have private pension funds to which they and their employers must contribute to. Self-employed persons, with some exceptions, are also legally required to contribute to a private pension plan accordingly to a sliding scale based on income.

== Civil service pensions ==
Civil servants receive pensions based on a set percentage of their final salaries, which increases for every year they work. All civil servants except for career soldiers can accumulate a pension up to a maximum of 70% of their final salary, while soldiers can accumulate up to 76%. All civil servants employed before 2004 are entitled to a pension of 70% of their finishing salary. The pensions are not based on accumulated contributions to a pension fund but rather come directly from the state budget.
