= Michal Abadi-Boiangiu =

Israeli economist, accountant and lawyer

- מיכל עבאדי-בויאנג'ו

Accountant General of Israel
- Incumbent
- Assumed office 1 February 2026
- Preceded by: Yali Rothenberg
- In office 2011 – January 2017
- Preceded by: Shouki Oren
- Succeeded by: Rony Hizkiyahu

Personal details
- Born: 5 December 1966 (age 59) Holon, Israel
- Citizenship: Israel
- Spouse: Andy Boiangiu
- Children: 2
- Education: Hebrew University of Jerusalem; Tel Aviv University
- Occupation: Economist, accountant, lawyer

Michal Esther Abadi-Boiangiu (Hebrew: מיכל אסתר עבאדי-בויאנג'ו; born 5 December 1966) is an Israeli economist, accountant and lawyer who has served as the Accountant General of Israel since January 2026, having previously held the position from 2011 to 2017. She was the first woman to serve as Israel's accountant general.

Between her two terms in government, Abadi-Boiangiu held senior positions in the private and public sectors, including chair of Psagot Investment House and chair of the Eilat Ashkelon Pipeline Company (EAPC). She has also served on the board of Israeli defense company Rafael Advanced Defense Systems.

== Early life and education ==
Abadi-Boiangiu was born on 5 December 1966 in Holon, Israel, where she was also raised. Her mother immigrated to Israel from Morocco at the age of 12 and worked as a midwife, while her father immigrated from Egypt at the age of 18.

She enlisted in the Israel Defense Forces in 1984 and served as an intelligence officer in Unit 8200.

Following her military service, Abadi-Boiangiu studied economics and accounting at the Hebrew University of Jerusalem, graduating with honors. She subsequently qualified as a certified public accountant. She later earned a law degree from Tel Aviv University and qualified as a lawyer.

== Career ==
=== Early career ===
Abadi-Boiangiu began her professional career in accounting, working at the Israeli accounting firm Somekh Chaikin.

She entered government service in 1997, when she became an economic adviser to Health Minister Yehoshua Matza. She subsequently served as a deputy director-general of the Ministry of Health, where her responsibilities included supervision of Israel's health maintenance organizations and supplementary health insurance programs.

In 2003, Abadi-Boiangiu was appointed chair of M.I. Holdings (State of Israel Properties), the government company responsible for the state's holdings in banks that had been nationalized following the 1983 Israel bank stock crisis.

In that capacity, she was involved in the privatization of the state's holdings in Israel Discount Bank, including the sale of a controlling stake to an investor group led by Matthew Bronfman.

She later joined the First International Bank of Israel, where she served as an executive vice president and headed the bank's chief accounting division.

== Accountant General of Israel ==
=== First term, 2011–2017 ===
In April 2011, Finance Minister Yuval Steinitz selected Abadi-Boiangiu to succeed Shouki Oren as Accountant General of Israel. The appointment was approved by the Israeli cabinet on 17 April 2011, making her the first woman to hold the position.

As accountant general, Abadi-Boiangiu was responsible for the execution of the state budget, government accounting, management of state assets, government procurement and Israel's public debt.

During her tenure, the Accountant General's office managed Israel's domestic and international government borrowing. In 2016, Israel issued US$1.5 billion in bonds in international markets, including a ten-year bond issued at what the Finance Ministry described as the lowest financing cost Israel had paid up to that point for a dollar-denominated issue.

Abadi-Boiangiu was also involved in government deliberations concerning the future of the Dead Sea Works concession. Near the end of her term, she argued that the concession, which was due to expire in 2030, should be awarded through a competitive tender rather than automatically extended to Israel Chemicals.

During her six-year tenure, she dealt with a number of issues involving Israel Chemicals, including the company's royalty payments, the state's golden share, the recommendations of the Sheshinski II Committee and the proposed acquisition of the company by Potash Corporation of Saskatchewan.

She also represented the Finance Ministry in overseeing the financial recovery agreement with Hadassah Medical Center. Abadi-Boiangiu publicly criticized the hospital's implementation of the recovery program, leading to a dispute with hospital director Zeev Rotstein.

Abadi-Boiangiu completed her first term in January 2017 and was succeeded by Rony Hizkiyahu.

== Private and corporate sector ==
Following the completion of her first term as accountant general, Abadi-Boiangiu returned to the corporate sector.

In February 2018, she was appointed chair of Psagot Investment House, one of Israel's largest investment firms at the time. She left the position in 2019.

In 2021, she was appointed chair of the Eilat Ashkelon Pipeline Company (EAPC), the state-owned company operating oil pipelines and storage infrastructure between Eilat and Ashkelon. She also served as chair of Dorad Energy and as a director of Rafael Advanced Defense Systems.

== Return as accountant general ==
In December 2025, Finance Minister Bezalel Smotrich selected Abadi-Boiangiu to return as accountant general following the end of Yali Rothenberg's term.

The Israeli cabinet approved her appointment on 11 January 2026. She took office in February 2026, becoming one of the relatively few officials to serve two separate terms as accountant general.

Her second term began as Israel faced elevated government borrowing requirements and fiscal pressures following the Israel–Hamas war. As accountant general, Abadi-Boiangiu is responsible for the state's debt management, execution of government expenditure, government procurement and relations with international credit-rating agencies.

In September 2026, amid discussions over additional defense spending, Abadi-Boiangiu opposed exceeding the government's fiscal deficit ceiling while stating that additional resources for defense could be accommodated through changes in spending priorities.

== Recognition ==
Forbes Israel included Abadi-Boiangiu in its 2013 ranking of influential women in Israel. The publication highlighted her position as the first female accountant general and her responsibility for overseeing government expenditure.

In 2016, Globes included her among its 50 most influential women in Israel. The publication noted her responsibility for the execution of the state budget and management of state assets.

In September 2026, The Jerusalem Post jointly ranked Abadi-Boiangiu and Amir Yaron, governor of the Bank of Israel, at number 32 in its annual list of the 50 most influential Jews.

== Personal life ==
Abadi-Boiangiu is married to Andy Boiangiu, a dentist, and they have two children. She lives in Holon.
