= Trajtenberg Committee =

Israeli government commission

The Trajtenberg Committee (Hebrew: ועדת טרכטנברג) is a commission appointed by the Israeli Prime Minister Benjamin Netanyahu on August 8, 2011, in order to examine and propose solutions to Israel's socioeconomic problems. The committee was established following the 2011 Israeli housing protests. The committee is headed by professor Manuel Trajtenberg, who was at the time the chairman of the Higher Education Planning and Budget Committee.

== The Commission ==
On August 8, 2011, Prime Minister Netanyahu appointed a special committee headed by Professor Trajtenberg.

The committee is to operate for a month, during which it will hold discussions with representatives of the protesters, with civil society organizations, and with various sectors of the public. Afterwards, in mid-September, the committee will make its recommendations to the government's socio-economic cabinet, headed by Finance Minister Yuval Steinitz and composed of 15 ministers. After that, the government will discuss the committee's conclusions.

=== Members ===
The committee includes 14 permanent members, 9 of whom are government or public officials and five of whom are from the academia and the private sector.

Two ministers, Michael Eitan and Limor Livnat, were appointed as observers in the committee.

- Prof. Manuel Trajtenberg – chairman of the Higher Education Planning and Budget Committee.
- Eyal Gabai – director-general of the Prime Minister's Office.
- Prof. Eugene Kandel – the head of the National Economic Council of the Prime Minister's Office.
- Gal Hershkovitz – budget chief at the Finance Ministry.
- Dr. Avi Simhon – the finance minister's senior economic adviser.
- Michal Abadi-Boiangiu – the Finance Ministry's accountant general.
- Shahar Cohen – social entrepreneur and NOVA (Management and Academia for the Community) academic director
- Esther Dominisini – National Insurance Institute Director General
- Dr. Karnit Flug – Bank of Israel deputy governor (later appointed governor)
- Dr. Shlomi Frizet – Antitrust Authority chief economist
- Dr. Yoram Gabbay – Chairman of Capital Market Activists and Deputy Chairman of the Hebrew University Maurice Falk Institute for Economic Research in Israel.
- Prof. Pnina Klein – Israel Prize Laureate of the Bar-Ilan University School of Education.
- Dr. Tali Regev – an economist from the Taub Center for Social Policy Studies in Israel.
- Prof. Rafi Melnick – Vice President of the Interdisciplinary Center in Herzliya.

=== Goals ===
The committee was ordered to investigate:

1. Proposals to change priorities in order to lighten the load of Israeli citizens.
2. Implementation of a new taxation system.
3. Providing access to social services.
4. Increasing competition in the Israeli economy.
5. Actual measures need to be taken to reduce housing prices.

== Recommendations ==
The committee's recommendations were published in September 2011. The recommendations were perceived to be good for the "hard-working middle classes". They included a slower increase for the defence budget. They were first discussed by the Israeli Cabinet a few days later.

== Implementation and Knesset approval ==
Netanyahu initially promised to push the committee's recommendations through the cabinet in one piece, but there were differences inside the governing coalition and a different approach of gradual implementation was eventually adopted.

In December 2011 the Knesset approved a series of amendments to Israel's tax law. These included an increase in the capital gains tax rate from 20% to 25%.

As part of measures to solve the country's housing shortage, the Trajtenberg recommendations included a plan to sell land at a discount to build 5,000 units of affordable housing. The homes would be sold through the existing Mehir Lemishtaken program to people deemed eligible for affordable housing at a discount to market prices. The Trajtenberg committee had recommended mandating that in the case of families, both parents be working. The Shas party objected to this, since it would make Haredi families less likely to qualify. Housing minister Ariel Atias (Shas) proposed criteria that would favour Haredi applicants; this was opposed by Prof. Trajtenberg himself, who said that Atias' criteria had nothing to do with social justice. A housing plan approved by the cabinet in March 2012 included sanctions against developers that delay construction, higher municipal taxes on unoccupied homes and measures to increase the housing supply in Arab communities.

The competition portion was approved by the cabinet in December 2011. The measures will reinforce the mandate of the anti-trust commissioner, subject the diesel and home gas markets to supervision, increase competition in the cement market, open Israeli ports up to competition, with private terminals opened in Haifa and Ashdod, and reinforce competition in the marketing of eggs, cheese and milk.

The portion of the recommendations for increasing employment were due to be brought to the cabinet for approval in February 2012. They included proposals to increase employment among Arab citizens of Israel, particularly among Arab women, as well as proposals for integrating disabled citizens into the workforce. The plan also called for improving labor law enforcement and assisting single mothers. Other measures aimed to limit foreign workers, creating a mechanism for encouraging them to leave, mandating that employers must deposit NIS 700 of the foreign employees' pensions into a savings fund that the workers receive only upon departing Israel. It also called for setting the minimum wage for foreigners working in industry at NIS 5,300 a month, which would make them more expensive to employ and let locals compete more easily. However the Trajtenberg proposals aiming to increase employment among the Haredi population were not included in the package. Currently only 37% of Haredi men and 49% of Haredi women work.

Other recommendations waiting for adoption include reducing the defense budget, opening up parallel imports, implementing free compulsory education for children aged 3 and 4 and providing more affordable housing.

Among sectors protected from competition from imports, the committee highlighted the cement market, 90% of which is held by Nesher. The committee argued for changing the formula for cement prices, which it said left Nesher with too much profit and blocked potential competition from imports. The committee also accused the Industry and Trade Ministry of blocking cheap cement imports in order to protect Nesher. A TV program by Channel 10 found that Nesher was selling cement at a 40% discount to Palestinians, and employing former high-ranking officials to help it get a foot into the Palestinian cement market.
