= Itamar Medical =

International company headquartered out of Israel

- Type: Subsidiary
- Traded as: TASE: ITMR; Nasdaq: ITMR
- Industry: Medical device
- Founded: 1995; 31 years ago
- Headquarters: Caesarea, Israel
- Area served: Worldwide
- Key people: Giora Yaron (Chairman); Gilad Glick (President)
- Products: WatchPAT, EndoPAT
- Revenue: US$33.2 million
- Number of employees: 184 (2019)
- Parent: ZOLL Medical Corporation
- Website: www.itamar-medical.com

Itamar Medical is a multinational company focused on the development, manufacturing and sales of medical devices related to respiratory sleep disorders. The company is headquartered in Caesarea, Israel and is owned by ZOLL Medical Corporation. The company is a medical device company providing continuum of care in the area of sleep disorder based on its WatchPAT diagnostic devices and early diagnosis of Atherosclerosis.

Itamar Medical was among the early companies to promote the link between sleep apnea and cardiovascular disease, and developed a platform enabling cardiologists to diagnose and manage sleep apnea in cardiac patients.

== History ==
Itamar Medical was founded in 1995 as a developer of devices for assessing vascular defects. Its early products included technology for early detection of heart disease (EndoPAT) and detection of sleep disorders (WatchPAT).

The company is named after Itamar Yaron (one of the founders' brothers), who was killed in the Yom Kippur War when trying to rescue an injured soldier and was awarded with a Medal of Courage. Itamar's headquarters is located in Caesarea, Israel, and the company has offices in the US, Japan, and the Netherlands.

In July 2002, Itamar Medical completed an $8 million financing round led by new investors, including Bay City Capital, with funds allocated into the development and commercialisation of its WatchPAT and ETT PAT devices, following FDA approval of WatchPAT for the U.S. market earlier that year.

In 2007, the company went public on the Tel Aviv Stock Exchange and on the Nasdaq. In 2011, the company made its first step on the Indian market. In 2012, the company's WatchPAT started being distributed in Russia by Medical Diagnostic Methods.

In July 2013, the company entered into an agreement with Somnoware Healthcare Systems to integrate its WatchPAT device with Somnoware’s cloud-based platform, with the aim of improving the coordination and delivery of sleep apnea care.

In January 2014, the company entered into a non-exclusive co-marketing agreement with Thorne Research, granting it marketing rights for the EndoPAT and WatchPAT devices in the United States and supporting their use among healthcare practitioners.

In July 2016, the U.S. Food and Drug Administration (FDA) expanded the indication of the WatchPAT device to include patients aged 12 and older, lowering the previous minimum age of 17.

In January 2019, Itamar Medical announced a private placement expected to raise nearly $12 million from U.S. and Israeli investors, with proceeds intended to support sales and marketing of its WatchPAT and EndoPAT devices.

In October 2019, the company appointed cardiologist Jennifer Cook as Global Medical Director to lead its research, clinical strategy, and scientific collaborations.

In 2020, the company raised $40 million on the NASDAQ.

In October 2020, Itamar Medical Ltd was awarded the SleepTech Award by the National Sleep Foundation, recognising its innovation in sleep technology.

In January 2021, the company agreed to acquire Spry Health, including its FDA-cleared wrist-worn remote patient monitoring system, to advance the development of continuous sleep apnea monitoring solutions.

In August 2021, Itamar Medical appointed Marga Ortigas-Wedekind to its Board of Directors, bringing over 30 years of experience in medical technology and digital health, including senior roles at iRhythm Technologies and Omnicell.

In December 2021, the company was acquired by ZOLL Medical Corporation and its stock delisted.

== Products and technology ==
- WatchPAT (FDA approval)
- EndoPAT (FDA approval)
- Sleep Apnea

The company’s Peripheral Arterial Tonometry (PAT) technology measures arterial function and blood flow during sleep to detect physiological signals associated with sleep apnea, evaluating vascular response and cardiac workload.

WatchPAT is a wearable diagnostic device that records physiological data during sleep and analyses it using proprietary algorithms to detect and assess sleep apnea. The system typically includes a finger-mounted sensor and a wrist-worn recording unit, and has been reported to provide results comparable to polysomnography.

The company also developed a platform that integrates the diagnosis, monitoring, and management of sleep apnea for healthcare providers.
