= Eli Hurvitz (Meridor) =

Eli (Eliyahu) Hurvitz
- אלי "אליהו" הורביץ
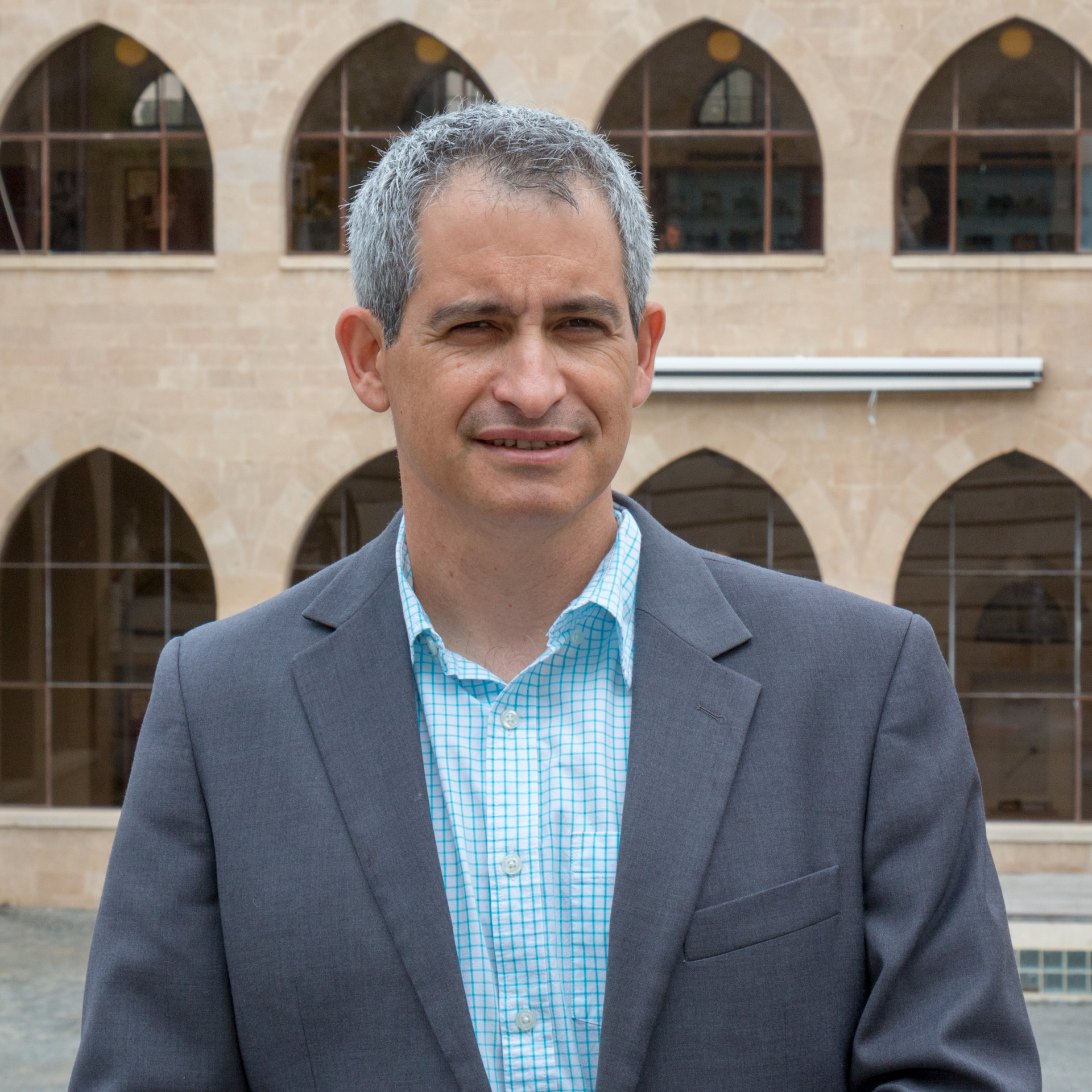
- Born: Eliyahu Hurvitz; 27 November 1970 (age 55); Jerusalem
- Citizenship: Israeli
- Education: Tel Aviv University
- Occupation: Philanthropy Executive
- Employer: Trump Foundation
- Title: Executive Director
- Relatives: Eliyahu Meridor (grandfather), Dan Meridor (uncle), Sallai Meridor (uncle), Yair Hurvitz (father)

Eli Hurvitz (Hebrew: אלי הורביץ; born 27 November 1970) is an Israeli philanthropist. He is the executive director of the Eddie and Jules Trump Family Foundation, as well as a member of the Israel National Council on Science Education and Artificial Intelligence.

Between 2000 and 2011, Hurvitz served as the deputy director of Yad Hanadiv and the Rothschild Family Foundation. He previously served as an advisor to the Chairman of the Foreign Affairs and Defense Committee at the Knesset.

== Early life and education ==
Hurvitz was born and educated in Jerusalem, to Yair (Esq.), former Director General of the State Comptroller of Israel, and Professor Haggit (M.D.), former Head of Pediatrics at the Bikur Holim Hospital. He is the first grandchild of Eliyahu Meridor, and is named after him. His uncles are Dan Meridor, former Deputy Prime Minister of Israel, and Sallai Meridor, former Israeli Ambassador to the US and Chairman of the Jewish Agency.

Hurvitz earned his B.A. and M.A. degrees magna cum laude at the Tel Aviv University's School of History. His M.A. thesis, titled ‘The Military Wing of Hizballah: a Social Profile’ was published by the Dayan Center in 1999. Since 2009, Hurvitz writes on social affairs and philanthropy for Israeli newspapers and in a blog, labeled, 'The Fourth Generation'. He is a co-editor of a series of educational books and host of popular videocasts on Education, titled 'Restart' and 'Relevance'.

== Career ==
Between 2000 and 2011, Hurvitz served as the deputy director of Yad Hanadiv, a philanthropic arm of the Rothschild Family Foundation. In the early 2000s, Hurvitz led Yad-Hanadiv's efforts to establish a new National Library for Israel, and represented the foundation in the Committee for Changing the Status of the National Library of Israel, headed by Supreme Court Judge Yitzhak Zamir.

In 2011, Hurvitz joined as executive director to set up the Eddie and Jules Trump Family Foundation, a philanthropic foundation that aims to serve as a catalyst for improving educational achievement in Israel by cultivating high-quality teaching in schools with an emphasis on Mathematics and the Sciences. The foundation is responsible for Israel's success to double the number of high school students graduating the advanced mathematics and physics majors ("five units").

In 2012, Hurvitz was selected by The Marker Magazine as #87 at "Israel's 100 Most Influential People". In 2015, Hurvitz was selected by Yediot Ahronot Newspaper to the list of 'Israel's 50 Heroes of Civil Society'. In 2016, he was nominated by The Marker Magazine as #57 at "Israel's 100 Most Influential People".

In 2014, Hurvitz was appointed by the Israeli government as member of the National Board of Education. In 2019, he joined the Global Advisory Board of the Center for Effective Philanthropy.

In 2022, he was nominated as a member of a Public Committee to expand the high-tech sector in Israel, and, in 2024, he was elected as chairman of the Israel Forum of Philanthropic Foundations. In 2025, Hurvits was appointed as member of the Israel National Council on Science Education and Artificial Intelligence.

== Op-Ed Articles ==
1. Eli Hurvitz, Young People are Experiencing Intellectual Decline - Opinion, Jerusalem Post, Dec. 24th, 2023
2. Eli Hurvitz, In This Crisis, A Golden Chance to Reimagine Education, Times of Israel, Dec. 24th, 2020
3. Eli Hurvitz, Report: Next Government Must Focus on Middle-School Reform, Jerusalem Post, Feb. 4th, 2019
