= Accountant General of Israel =

Office of the Accountant General
Agency overview
- Jurisdiction: Israel
- Headquarters: Kaplan Street 1, Givat Ram, Jerusalem
- Minister responsible: Bezalel Smotrich
- Agency executive: Michal Abadi-Boiangiu, Accountant General
- Parent agency: Ministry of Finance
- Website: Official website

The Accountant General (Hebrew: החשב הכללי, HaChasháv HaKláli) in the Ministry of Finance, is responsible for the practical implementation of the Israeli state budget. This position, which oversees the ongoing management of the state's assets, expenditures, and public debt, plays a central role in the functioning of the Israeli government.

The current Accountant General is Michal Abadi-Boiangiu.

== Responsibilities ==
The Accountant General oversees the execution of the state budget. Every financial expenditure of a government ministry requires the approval of its accountant, who acts as a representative of the Accountant General (each ministry has its own accountant, e.g., "Accountant of the Ministry of Health", "Accountant of the Ministry of Foreign Affairs"). Any contract involving the state also requires the Accountant General's approval, as does procurement conducted on behalf of the government.

The office is also responsible for managing state assets, including privatization efforts, financing the national debt (via the Government Debt Management Unit), managing the government vehicle fleet, overseeing governmental assets and construction, and supervising governmental information technology and information systems initiatives.

The Internal Audit Law, 1992, authorizes the Accountant General (via the Internal Auditor of the Office of the Accountant General) to oversee "internal audits of the implementation of the state budget in the accounting and finance units of government ministries" .

The Office of the Accountant General also includes the Accounting and Reporting Unit, which is tasked with implementing IPSAS (International Public Sector Accounting Standards), preparing consolidated financial statements for the Israeli government (including government ministries, government companies, statutory corporations, investments in PPP projects, and VC funds), and establishing operational risk management frameworks. This unit is headed by the Chief Accountant.

== List of Accountant Generals ==
Name	Start of Term	End of Term
Mordechai Zagagi	1948	1952
Avraham Naaman	1952	1961
Dov Ben-Dror	1961	1968
Yoram Reuven	1968	1971
Haim Shtesel	1971	1977
Giora Gazit	1977	1979
Eitan Raff	1979	1983
Aryeh Shar	1983	1989
Eli Yones	1989	1993
Reuven Kukolevich	1993	1995
Shai Talmon	1995	1999
Nir Gilad	1999	2003
Yaron Zelekha	2003	2007
Shuki Oren	2007	2011
Michal Abadi-Boiangiu	2011	2017
Rony Hizkiyahu	2017	2020
Yahli Rothenberg	2020	2026
Michal Abadi-Boiangiu	2026	Incumbent
