= Taxation in Israel =

Taxation in Israel include income tax, capital gains tax, value-added tax and land appreciation tax. The primary law on income taxes in Israel is codified in the Income Tax Ordinance. There are also special tax incentives for new immigrants to encourage aliyah.

Following Israel’s social justice protests in July 2011, Prime Minister Benjamin Netanyahu created the Trajtenberg Committee to hold discussions and make recommendations to the government's socio-economic cabinet, headed by Finance Minister Yuval Steinitz. During December 2011 the Knesset reviewed these recommendations and approved a series of amendments to Israel's tax law. Among the amendments were the raising of the corporate tax rate from 24% to 25% and possibly 26% in 2013. Additionally, a new top income bracket of 48% (instead of 45%) would be introduced for people earning more than NIS 489,480 per annum. People who earn more than NIS 1 million a year would pay a surtax of 2% on their income and taxation of capital gains would not be decreased to 20% but remain at 25% in 2012.

== Income tax ==
=== Filing status ===
Israeli residents are taxed on their worldwide income, while non-residents are taxed only on their Israeli-sourced income. Income includes employment and business income, and passive income from bank deposits and savings.

An individual is deemed to be resident if they spend 183 days or more in Israel during the current tax year, or 30 days or more in Israel during the current tax year and 425 days or more during the current tax year and the preceding two years.

A single person files a single assessment, while a married couple normally files a joint assessment, but may opt out if the need arises.

A year for tax purposes for individuals is a calendar year and must file their annual tax returns by the 30 April of the following year.

=== Tax rates ===
The basic rates of income tax are as follows (according to the Israeli Tax Authority). Taxes are charged based on annual income; salaries in Israel are usually discussed at the monthly rate so these are included for convenience.

Annual income level (NIS)	Monthly income level (NIS)	2024 tax rate
0 – 84,120	0 - 7,010	10%
84,121 – 120,720	7,011 - 10,060	14%
120,721 – 193,800	10,061 - 16,150	20%
193,801 – 269,280	16,151 - 22,440	31%
269,281 – 560,280	22,441 - 46,690	35%
560,281 - 721,560	46,691 - 60,130	47%
over 721,560	over 60,130	50%

Other income sources	2014 tax rate
Capital gains	25-32%
Interest	25-32%
Dividends	25-32%
Inheritance	None

== Corporate tax ==
=== Filing status ===
A corporation is deemed to be subject to Israeli taxes if its activities are managed and controlled within the State of Israel or established under its laws. A domestic corporation is subject to taxation on its worldwide income. A foreign corporation with an Israeli subsidiary is only taxed on income derived from, accrued or received in Israel, while a non-resident company without a subsidiary is only taxed on income sourced in Israel.

A year for tax purposes is a calendar year, however businesses may request a different schedule. Businesses must file their annual tax returns five months after the end of their year.

=== Tax rates ===
The corporate tax rate in Israel was 25% as of January 1, 2016, decreased to 24% on January 1, 2017, and to 23% on January 1, 2018.

== Value-added tax ==
Value-added tax (VAT) in Israel, is applied to most goods and services, including imported goods and services. From 1 January 2025 the standard rate was increased to 18% from 17%. It had been decreased to 17% from 18% on 1 October 2015. It had been raised from 16% to 17% on 1 September 2012, and to 18% on 2 June 2013.

Certain items, such as exported goods and the provision of certain services to non-residents are zero-rated. VAT on imported goods is levied on value plus customs duty, purchase tax and other levies.

Multinational companies that provide services to Israel through the Internet, such as Google and Facebook, must pay VAT.

Electronic filing of VAT is mandatory.

== National insurance (Social Security) ==
Current rates of national insurance for employees, including health insurance and Bituah Leumi contributions (as of January 2020, in NIS)

	up to 6,331 monthly salary	6,331–44,020 monthly salary
Employee's share	3.50%	12.00%
Employer's share	3.55%	7.60%

Additionally self-employed individuals pay between 9.82% and 16.23%.

== Stamp duty ==
Historically, Israel had a stamp duty on signed documents. Documents and duties were regulated by the 1961 "Stamp Tax on Documents" (Law 5731-1961), the 1965 "Stamp Tax on Documents Regulations", and subsequent Additions. Documents below a certain value could be self-stamped at a postal-bank; in 2004, this threshold value was raised from 62,500 NIS to 125,000 NIS. As of 2006 this tax is no longer collected.

Israel has no other stamp-based taxes.

== New immigrants and returning citizens ==
New immigrants and returning citizens are entitled to various benefits granted by the Tax Ordinance. These benefits were extended in 2008 in commemoration of Israel's 60th anniversary to try further to provide incentives for Jews to make Aliyah. A returning citizen is someone who has either resided overseas for at least 10 years; or resided overseas for 5 years and returned to Israel during 2007-2009; or were considered foreign residents on January 1, 2007. Special benefits also exist for returning scientists, and entrepreneurs. The law was introduced in order to persuade many Israelis, who had made yerida (left the state of Israel) to return. These tax benefits are offered to new immigrants who made Aliyah after January 1, 2007 as follows:

=== 10-year exemptions for companies ===
Returning residents or new immigrants who own and manage a foreign company that is active abroad, or own its shares, will no longer be automatically subject to Israeli taxes. Thus, the company will be able to continue generating tax-free revenues, so long as these revenues are not generated in Israel.

=== 10-year exemption for earnings from abroad ===
Returning residents or new immigrants, and the companies that are under their direction, are not obliged to report earnings that benefit from exemption. Only income from activities in Israel and from Israeli investments and assets that is generated following Aliyah or return to the country is subject to reporting and taxation according to regular tax laws.

=== 10-year expansion of tax benefits ===
Returning residents and new immigrants are exempt from taxes for 10 years on income generated outside Israel. This covers all income, active or passive, such as interest, dividends, pensions, royalties and rental of assets. All income, whether from the realization of assets and investments abroad or from regular income abroad, is exempt from tax.

=== Pension benefits ===
New immigrants are exempt from paying taxes on their pension. Returning residents are exempt from paying taxes on their pension for ten years.

=== Tax benefits for new immigrants ===
New immigrants are entitled to tax deductions as follows:

- During the first 18 months – 3 tax credit points.
- During the following year – 2 points.
- During the third year – 1 point.

==== On interest from foreign currency deposits ====
New immigrants are entitled to exemption from paying tax on interest on foreign currency deposits for 20 years, so long as the source of those deposits is capital they possessed prior to their immigration, and which was deposited in an Israeli banking institution.

=== An adjustment year ===
New immigrants and returning residents can fill in an application form for an adjustment year. During the year, they will not be considered to be Israeli citizens for tax purposes. At the end of the year, if they remain in Israel they are entitled to all the benefits that are part of the new tax reform.
