= Ironi Alef High School =

School in Tel Aviv, Israel

Coordinates: 32°4′17.14″N 34°47′2.45″E

Ironi Alef High School (Hebrew: תיכון עירוני א'), previously Gymnasia Balfour (גימנסיה בלפור), is a notable high school located in Tel Aviv, Israel. Also known as Aleph High School of Arts Tel Aviv-Yafo.

== History ==
=== Gymnasia Balfour ===
The Gymnasia Balfour was founded in 1931 by Alexander Koler as a private gymnasium, Real Balfour Gymnasia (Hebrew: הגימנסיה הריאלית בלפור). Koler decided to build the gymnasium similar in spirit to those in Europe which would provide its students education in Hebrew that would allow them to enter a university. He had previously managed a government-run gymnasium in Galicia (modern-day Poland). The school was situated on Mazeh Street in Tel Aviv, near the water tower. Koler carefully chose the teachers for the school – most of whom were immigrants from Eastern Europe whom he knew personally from his days in Poland. In addition to general curriculum, selective students were given an opportunity to partake in a business school. These students did not continue their extended studies in English, Hebrew and mathematics.

The school quickly developed into a very prestigious and selective institution, providing the highest levels of education in the country. The school became a Jewish cultural with national values. Due to its great success, Koler founded a second school in Ramat Gan called Ohel Shem.

In 1935, Paul Rieger took over as the head of the school. During those years Rieger had significant influence on the school. He improved the teaching methods, and increased the level of education. The results were evident in the significant increase in the number of applicants. In 1943 Rieger left the school to be the head of Levinsky College of Education. He was succeeded by David Rachavi (Rakowitzki).

=== Ironi Alef ===
In July 1947 the school discontinued its private operations and was sold to the Tel Aviv municipality. It had since been renamed to Ironi Alef High School (Hebrew: תיכון עירוני א). Even after becoming a public school, the school maintained its prestigious standing. After its sale to the Tel Aviv municipality and during the first few years after the creation of Israel the school continued to be directed by David Rachavi at its previous address. The school was than relocated to Shprintsak Street in Tel Aviv. Dr. Joseph Fried replaced Rachavi from 1963 until 1975. In 1976 he was succeeded by David Ben-Zvi until 1980.

Due to demographic changes in Tel Aviv and the aging population around the school, the school saw a decline in the number of students. This led to an initiative by Ilana Minkin, the director of the school from 1981 until 2000, to establish an art school as part of the school. The initiative corresponded well with its location, next to institutions like the Habima Theatre and the Tel Aviv Museum of Art. The move proved to be successful, increasing the number of students and producing many notable artists such as Maor Cohen, Rami Heuberger, Erez Tal, and Danielle Wircer.

== Notable alumni ==
- Rami Heuberger, (1963–2025), director, actor and entertainer
- David Libai (1934–2023), jurist and former politician
- Shlomo Lipetz (born 1979), baseball player
- Tzipi Livni (1958–), politician, served as Israel's foreign minister
- Shimon Peres (1923–2016), Served as Prime Minister and as President of Israel, Nobel Laureate
- Amos de-Shalit (1926–1969), Israeli nuclear physicist
- Erez Tal (1961–), actor and television host
- Yon Tumarkin (1989–), actor
- Rafael Vardi (1922–2016), IDF Major General, former head of the Manpower Directorate
- Israel Yeivin (1923–2008), Linguist, scholar of Masorah and the Hebrew language
- Dana International (1969 -), singer and winner of the Eurovision Song Contest 1998
- Bar Paly (1982 -), actress and model
- Liora Meridor (1947–2023), Israeli economist
