= Avraham Shochat =

Israeli politician (1936–2024)

- אברהם שוחט
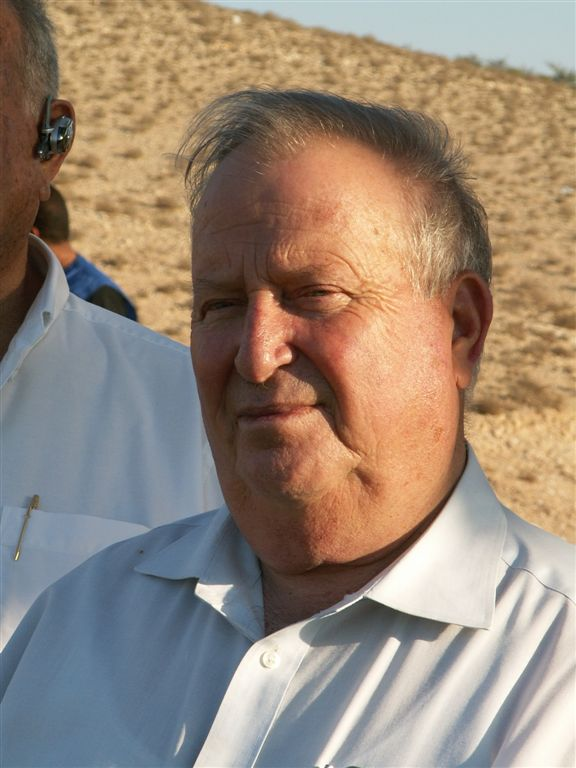
- Shochat in 2007

Ministerial roles
- 1992–1996: Minister of Finance
- 1999–2001: Minister of Finance
- 2000–2001: Minister of National Infrastructure

Faction represented in the Knesset
- 1988–1991: Alignment
- 1991–1999: Labor Party
- 1999–2001: One Israel
- 2001–2006: Labor Party

Personal details
- Born: 14 June 1936 Tel Aviv, Mandatory Palestine
- Died: 28 February 2024 (aged 87)
- Nickname(s): Baiga/Beiga, Beigele

Avraham Shochat (Hebrew: אברהם שוחט; 14 June 1936 – 28 February 2024) was an Israeli politician who twice served as Minister of Finance. Shochat was mayor of Arad for 20 years.

== Biography ==
Avraham ("Beiga") Shochat was born in Tel Aviv during the Mandate era. After serving in the Israel Defense Forces as a corporal in the Nahal paratroopers, he attended the Technion, where he gained a BSc in civil engineering. During his studies he was elected chairman of the Student Union.

Shochat was married to Tama, daughter of Israeli prime minister Levi Eshkol, with whom he had three children.

Shochat was one of the founders of the modern city of Arad in 1962. As a civil engineer, he helped to plan Arad’s first permanent housing development. He worked as branch director of Solel Boneh in Arad and the Dead Sea area, and was a member of the Board of Directors of Israel Aircraft Industries and Negev Phosphates.

Shochat died on 28 February 2024, at the age of 87.

== Political career ==
In 1967 Shochat became head of the Arad local council. He served as mayor of Arad for twenty years. In addition to his mayoral duties he was deputy chairman of the Union of Local Authorities, chairman of the Development Towns Committee of the Union of Local Authorities.

In the 1984 Knesset elections he was on the Alignment's Knesset list, but failed to win a seat. However, when Aharon Harel resigned from the Knesset in May 1988, Shochat replaced him. He retained his seat in elections in November that year, and became chairman of the Finance Committee and the Economic Affairs Committee. After being re-elected in 1992 (by which time the Alignment had become the Labour Party), he was appointed Minister of Finance by Yitzhak Rabin. Although he was re-elected again in 1996, the opposition Likud won the election and Shochat lost his ministerial position.

Following victory for Ehud Barak and One Israel (an alliance of Labour, Meimad and Gesher) in 1999, Shochat was once again appointed Minister of Finance. In October 2000 he was also made Minister of National Infrastructure replacing Eliyahu Swisa after Shas left Barak's coalition. After Ariel Sharon won special elections for Prime Minister in 2001, Shochat left the cabinet. In the 2003 elections he also lost his Knesset seat.

After leaving the Knesset, Shochat was commissioned to produce a report on tuition fees for Israeli university students. His report, published in July 2007, recommended raising fees for Bachelor's degrees by 70% and increasing government funding for higher education by NIS 1.5 billion.
