= Standard of living in Israel =

Israel's standard of living is significantly higher than all of the other countries in the region and equal to Western-European countries, and is comparable to that of other highly developed countries. Israel was ranked 19th out of 189 countries in the 2019 Human Development Index, indicating "very high" development. It is considered a high-income country by the World Bank. Israel also has a very high life expectancy at birth. It is ranked 8th in the World Happiness Report (2026) and second in happiness in young people.

== History ==
Following Israel's establishment in 1948 and the 1948 war that began immediately afterward, the country was impoverished and lacking in foreign currency reserves. Living standards saw some increase in the first year after independence. Israel had to recover from the effects of the war, and saw a wave of mass Jewish immigration from Europe after World War II and Middle Eastern countries, doubling the Jewish population in three years. The country was financially overwhelmed and faced a deep economic crisis. As a result, a strict regime of austerity was put in place. Food, furniture, and footwear were heavily rationed. Rationing allowed for a meager 1,600 calories a day, with additional calories for children, the elderly, and pregnant women. Throughout the austerity period, living standards were preserved at tolerable levels, and the regime of strict rationing enabled the Israeli government to ensure that the entire population was adequately fed, clothed, and sheltered.

In 1952, Israel and West Germany signed a reparations agreement. West Germany agreed to pay Israel financial reparations for the Holocaust, ultimately paying over 3 billion marks over a period of 14 years. The agreement went to force in 1953, when the first reparations payments arrived. As a result, most austerity restrictions were lifted that year; some remained in place, and were gradually lifted throughout the following years. The families receiving the reparations payments saw a considerable increase in their standard of living; on average, they doubled their incomes.

Throughout the 1950s, Israel was heavily reliant on reparations payments from West Germany, and on financial donations from Jews around the world, especially American Jews. Israel used these sources to invest in its infrastructure and in industrial and agricultural development projects, which allowed the country to become economically self-sufficient. Due to this commitment to development in its first two decades of existence, Israel experienced economic growth rates that exceeded 10% annually. Average living standards rose steadily; between 1950 and 1963, the expenditure of an average wage-earner's family rose 97% in real terms. Between 1955 and 1966, per capita consumption in Israel rose by 221% and in 1963, 93% of the population had electricity and 97% had running water.

Israeli historian Tom Segev described the improvement in living conditions during the 1950s due to the rapid development of the country:

The new industrial and agricultural equipment created better conditions for the worker and the farmer. Soon, display windows began showing merchandise long absent; fruits, vegetables, and various food products. People were able to enjoy apples again and spread their bread with butter instead of margarine. Now it was possible to choose from a variety of clothes, shoes, furniture, paper goods, and electrical equipment. The supply did not equal what was available in developed countries, but it was enough to give the impression that the country was finally emerging from austerity... New power stations arrived, and there were fewer electrical outages. People could now have their own telephone lines and travel on railroad cars offering almost European comfort and luxury.

From 1950 to 1976, Israel managed to raise its standard of living threefold. For instance, consumption of animal protein per capita rose from 32.2 to 49.4 grams (1.14 to 1.74 oz) per day, while during that same period, the percentage of families owning an electric refrigerator increased from 2.4% to 99.0%. Family ownership of other durables also showed increases. From 1970 to 1976, the percentage of families owning a gas/electric range and oven rose from 5% to 51.8%, and a television set from 49.7% to 89.5%. From 1957 to 1976, the percentage of families owning an electric washing machine rose from 6.9% to 74.6%, and from 1955 to 1976, the percentage of families owning a radio rose from 54.7% to 84.2%. The percentage of families owning a car also increased, from 4.1% in 1962 to 31.2% in 1976.

One aspect of daily life in Israel that set it apart from much of the world for many years was the absence of television, and then of color television. Television was only introduced in 1966, in schools as an educational tool, and regular public transmissions began in 1968. Even then, all television broadcasts were in black and white, at a time when American and European stations were switching to full-scale color transmissions. Color transmissions were initially banned due to fears of social inequality, although ordinary citizens found ways around this ban, and were only gradually introduced around 1980.

In the 1970s, Israeli living standards were comparable with those of some Western European countries. However, the years following the Yom Kippur War saw stalled economic growth and increased inflation. Economic growth was on average 0.4% annually, and living standards saw minimal growth, and eventually became completely stagnant. This continued into the 1980s; the Israeli economy was in a dire situation following a financial crisis in 1983, and was saved by the 1985 economic stabilization plan which saw market-oriented reforms to Israel's economy, which had previously been heavily regulated. Despite these reforms, there was no immediate growth in quality of life; by 1989, living standards in Israel had not increased in more than a decade.

In addition to the 1985 stabilization plan, mass Jewish immigration from the former Soviet Union in the 1990s brought many highly educated and skilled immigrants to Israel, and the Israeli government implemented effective macroeconomic policies. As a result, Israel experienced an economic boom, and living standards rose. In 2002, Israeli living standards began climbing rapidly, and the gap between Israel and many other Western nations in quality of life began to narrow.

In the early 2000s, Israeli living standards were comparable with those of Western Europe. In 2006, Israel was rated as having the 23rd-highest quality of life in the world by the United Nations Human Development Index. In 2010, Israel was ranked 15th in quality of life. In 2011, Bank of Israel Governor Stanley Fischer said that Israel had a standard of living two-thirds as high as that of the United States.

In 2011, social justice protests broke out across the country over the high cost of living. In 2012, a report issued by the Taub Center stated that while living standards in Israel were rising, they were rising more slowly than those of other Western countries.

In late 2013, the Israeli government approved a series of measures to lower the country's high cost of living. A law was passed to break up large conglomerates and end economic concentration, so as to encourage economic competition. A new committee was also formed to remove import barriers and lower prices, making them more comparable to prices abroad.

== Demographics ==
According to census, Israel's population is 75.4% Jewish, and 20.5% Arab. The Arab population comprise Arab Muslims (including Bedouins), Arab Christians, and Druze. About 4,000 Armenians and 4,000 Circassians live in Israel. There are smaller numbers of people of Jewish heritage or spouses of Jews, non-Arab Christians, and non-Arab Muslims. 3.7% of people are not classified by religion.

== In numbers ==
Israel was ranked 19th out of 189 nations in the 2019 Human Development Index ranking.

In the 2026 World Happiness Report, Israel ranked 8th globally, maintaining its position among the top ten even thought it's affected by continuous wars.

Israel was ranked 4th best performing economy according to the Economist as of 2022 and 2023.

== Modern standard of living ==
=== Wealth and income distribution ===
A 2013 Gallup survey of median household income among countries (though without taking taxes and social contributions into account), based on data collected from 2006 to 2012, found Israel to have the 21st highest median household income in the world.

A 2014 Credit Suisse report found Israelis to be prosperous by world standards. Defining "wealth" as financial resources (cash, stocks, and bonds) and owned property, adjusted to deduct debt, the report found residents of Israel to be the sixth wealthiest people on average in the Middle East and Asia-Pacific region, trailing only Australia, Singapore, Japan, New Zealand, and Taiwan. The report also found that average Israeli wealth slightly exceeds average European wealth. However, the national wealth was found to be distributed slightly more inequitably than in most industrialized countries, although wealth distribution was found to be on par with some industrialized European countries and more equitable than in the United States, with about 67.3% of national assets held by the richest 10% of the population. This is roughly on par with some European countries, including Sweden, Austria, Norway, and Germany, as well as China, Mexico, and Saudi Arabia, while wealth is distributed more equitably across most other European countries.

According to the Gini coefficient, Israel has high income inequality and is one of the most unequal among 34 OECD countries. A 2014 Taub Center report likewise found Israel second only to the United States in terms of disposable income inequality after taxes and government transfers among 22 OECD countries, based on statistics from the mid-2000s. This contradiction may be explained by the presence of the black and grey market economies, which the Gini Coefficient does not take into account. Some estimates suggest up to a quarter of economic activity in Israel goes unreported to tax authorities and statisticians.

A 2015 OECD report found that the Israeli tax burden was slightly lower than average among OECD countries, with Israelis paying an average of 31.4% of their income in taxes, slightly lower than the OECD average of 34.4%, although this is still significantly higher than the tax burden in the United States, Mexico, and Chile. The report also found Israeli salaries to be lower than the OECD average.

Despite high levels of wealth, a major factor affecting purchasing power is the high cost of living in Israel, which is higher than the OECD average. This is seen as having a significant impact on the middle and working classes. However, the cost of living is on the decline.

In January 2021, Bituah Leumi published a report on poverty and inequality in Israel, which showed that 1,980,309 Israelis lived below the poverty line in 2020 - 23% of Israeli citizens and 31.7% of Israeli children. In the Jewish population, the proportion was 17.7%, and in the ultra-Orthodox sector 49%. In the Arab population it was 35.8%. Unemployment benefits alone lifted 23.6% of families out of poverty, compared to 2% in 2019.

=== Material prosperity ===
The following table contains statistics on the ownership of durable goods among Israeli households in 2015.

Product	Percentage of household ownership
Refrigerator	99.8%
Deep freezer	23.2%
Cooking and baking stove	35%
Baking stove	60.5%
Cooking stove	66.4%
Microwave	85.6%
Dishwasher	39.2%
Water purifier	35.9%
Washing machine	96.1%
Clothes dryer	41.1%
Air conditioner	89.1%
Vacuum cleaner	61.8%
Television set	87.5% (53.6% with more than one)
DVD system	33.8%
Cable or satellite television	59.2%
Satellite dish	16.6%
Digital convector	12%
Computer	80.3% (34.8% with more than one)
Internet subscription	74.3%
Tablet computer	40.9%
Gaming console	14.7%
One or more phone lines	69.2% (3.5% with more than one)
Two or more phone lines	3.6%
One mobile phone or more	96.9% (74.9% with more than one)
One car or more	69.7% (24.4% with more than one)
Central heating	3.7%
Flat heating	4.3%
Solar water heater	82.6%

=== Housing ===
Most Israelis live in apartments. According to the Israeli Central Bureau of Statistics, 33% live in three-room apartments, 28% in four-room apartments, and 13% in five-room apartments. CBS statistics also showed that 5% live in one-room apartments, while only 0.6% of Israelis live in a property with eight rooms or more. The CBS also reports that Israeli households contain .8 persons per room. According to the OECD, the average number of rooms per person is 1.1.

In 2014, home ownership in Israel stood at 67.3% of the population. This figure stood behind many other developed and developing countries, although still higher than some other developed countries including the United States, France, and Germany. Housing in the country is notoriously expensive, with homes costing an average of 148 monthly salaries. A 2013 report found home ownership was found to have noticeably declined between 1997 and 2012. Many Israelis require mortgages to purchase homes, although mortgages are easy to obtain.

=== Health ===
Israel has a system of universal health care run by semi-private non-profit corporations heavily regulated by the government, wherein all citizens are entitled to the same Uniform Benefit Package. All Israeli citizens are required to have membership in one of four Health Maintenance Organizations which are subsidized by taxpayer funds. According to a 2000 study by the World Health Organization, Israel had the 28th best health care system in the world. In 2013, Bloomberg ranked Israel as having the fourth most efficient healthcare system in the world, surpassed only by Hong Kong, Singapore, and Japan.

Israel's medical facilities are recognized worldwide for their high standards of health services, medical resources and research, modern hospital facilities, and ratio of physicians and specialists to the population. Israeli doctors earn NIS 20,000–24,000 (US$5,000–$6,000) per month.

Israel has one of the highest life expectancies at birth in the world, ranking 8 out of 224 nations (2009), with an average life expectancy of 80.73. However, Israel's Arab population has a life expectancy of 75.9 years for males, and 79.7 years for females. Israel's infant mortality rate is also extremely low, with 2.2 per 1,000 live births for Jews, and 6.4 for Arabs. Emergency medical services are generally provided by Magen David Adom, Israel's national emergency medical, disaster, ambulance, and blood bank service. In some areas, it is supplemented by Hatzalah and the Palestine Red Crescent Society.

=== Education ===
According to a 2014 OECD survey, Israel is the fourth most educated country in the world, with about 46% of adults achieving a tertiary qualification. Only Russia, Canada, and Japan exceed Israel's figures.

Israel's educational expenditures comprise 6.9% of its GDP (2004), placing Israel 25th out of 182 on the CIA World Factbook's country comparison of educational expenditures as a percent of GDP.

23.9% of Israel's adult population (age 25+) has achieved a low attainment level of education, 33.1% has achieved a medium attainment level of education, and 39.7% has achieved a high attainment level of education. Israel's literacy rate is 97.1% (2004 est.)

Israeli schools are divided into four tracks: public state-run schools, state-funded yeshivas, Arab schools, and bilingual schools for both Jewish and Arab children. Secondary education prepares students for matriculation exams known as Bagrut. If a student passes, he or she receives a matriculation certificate.

Many Jewish schools in Israel have highly-developed special education programs for disabled children, libraries, computers, science laboratories, and film editing studios.

Typically, after a student graduates, he or she will be conscripted into the Israel Defense Forces, Israel Border Police, or Israel Prison Service, although most Arabs are exempt. A student may, however, request to be drafted at a later date to study at a college or university, or a school known as a Mechina, which prepares them for military or national service. Those who study in a university at this stage do so under a contract in which the Army will pay for their Bachelor's degree, but will extend their service by 2–3 years. Universities generally require a number of matriculation units, a certain grade point average, and a good grade on the Psychometric Entrance Test. Israel currently has nine public universities and a number of smaller colleges. According to Webometrics, six Israeli universities are among the top 100 universities in Asia.

All nine Israeli public universities and some colleges are heavily subsidized, and pupils pay only a small part of the actual tuition.

=== Social classes ===
==== Wealthy ====
In 2013, Israel ranked 10th in the world in percentage of millionaires among the population, with 3.8% of households holding assets in excess of $1 million, and eighth in the percentage of households holding assets in excess of $100 million.

==== Middle class ====
A Taub Center report from 2014 notes that the Israeli middle class is divided into the lower and upper-middle classes, with a large income gap between them. The lower middle class, comprising about 40% of the population, has a monthly per capita wage range of NIS 1,950 to NIS 5,000. The upper-middle-class, which comprises about 29% of the population, has a monthly per capita wage range of NIS 5,100 to NIS 12,540.

==== Poverty ====
Estimates of the Israeli poverty rate vary. Israel's poverty levels are commonly viewed as high in comparison with other developed countries, although it has been argued that poverty rates are significantly lower than officially reported due to the presence of a large underground economy in Israel.

A report issued by the OECD in 2016 ranks Israel as the country with the highest rates of poverty among its members. Approximately 21 percent of Israelis were found to be living under the poverty line – more than in countries such as Mexico, Turkey, and Chile. The OECD average is a poverty rate of 11 percent.

However, it has also been suggested that Israel's true poverty rate is in fact far lower, and the statistics are skewed by significant underreporting of income, as World Bank research shows Israel as having one of the largest underground economies in the developed world. One former Bank of Israel chief noted a significant underreporting of income among Arabs and Haredim, and said that based on surveys of household spending rather than income, Israel's actual core poverty rate is around 12% of households.

During the late 1980s and 1990s, poverty rates in Israel fluctuated (according to one estimate) from 12.8% in 1989 to 18% in 1994, before falling to about 16% in 1997. The report published by the National Insurance Institute (NII) indicates that poverty levels remained relatively stable in 2006–2007. Roughly 20.5% of Israeli families were found to be living below the poverty line in 2008, a slight increase from the previous year's 20%. Moreover, 24.7% of Israel's residents and 35.9% of its children lived in impoverished conditions.

Data for the 2006–2007 NII survey indicates that 420,000 impoverished families resided in Israel (1.5 million people), including some 805,000 children. Poverty indicators for families with a single wage-earner have risen from 22.6% during the last NII survey to 23.9% in the current one.

Poverty is high among Ultra-Orthodox Jews and Israeli Arabs. Comparing a March 2011 report by Adalah, to today, poverty in Arab families in Israel has improved by 8–10% in just one decade. Among Israeli Arabs, Druze and Christian Arabs have a higher employment rate than Muslims. Poverty rates are also high among Haredi Jews, as a result of many Haredi men being voluntarily unemployed and opting for religious studies while relying on social assistance instead of working, as well as underemployment due to Haredi schools being exempt from the core curriculum.

The Israeli welfare system is less effective than most OECD countries. While the median poverty reduction rate through taxes and welfare among OECD countries is 40%, the figure stands at 25% in Israel, the second-lowest rate in the OECD, behind only the United States.

Homelessness is a rare phenomenon. A December 2015 study found there to be about 2,300 homeless people in Israel, out of a population of about 8.5 million. The most common reason for homelessness was substance abuse or alcoholism, followed by financial problems and mental illness.

As per the annual report released by the National Insurance Institute in December 2024, it was revealed that almost two million individuals resided below the poverty line in Israel during 2023, with 27.9% of them being children and 12.8% being elderly.

Recent reports indicate that an increasing number of families in Israel are struggling to maintain adequate access to food amid rising living costs. According to the Israeli anti-poverty organization Latet, studies published between 2024 and 2025 estimate that approximately 867,256 households, including around 1.2 million children, experience food insecurity—affecting more than one-quarter of families. The reports highlight that rising prices, inflation, and declining purchasing power have made it increasingly difficult for some households, including those with at least one employed adult, to secure sufficient and nutritious food.

=== Poverty rate by district ===
Percent of population living on less than $2.15, $3.65 and $6.85 a day, international dollars (2017 PPP) as per the World Bank.

Percent of population living on less than poverty thresholds
District	$2.15	$3.65	$6.85	Year
Southern District	1.22%	2.45%	5.41%	2018
Yehuda and Shomron	0.62%	0.62%	4.24%	2018
Jerusalem	0.58%	1.66%	7.97%	2018
Northern District	0.48%	0.86%	3.75%	2018
Haifa	0.11%	0.83%	1.81%	2018
Tel Aviv	0.11%	0.21%	1.05%	2018
Central District	0.07%	0.39%	0.84%	2018

=== Social mobility ===
Social mobility in Israel is high by Western standards. According to statistics from the late 1990s, which, based on other tests, are not believed to have changed significantly, class mobility rates in Israel are between 72 and 74%, higher than in other developed countries including the United States, United Kingdom, and France. Although there is relatively high equality of opportunity, there are still significant differences that remain. Ashkenazi Jews were found to be wealthier on average than Mizrahi Jews, who were in turn wealthier than Arabs.

Israel is cited as having high social mobility due to the volume of Jewish immigrants in recent history. The current state of Israel shows fluid mobility among these Jewish immigrants. A possible reason for this ethnic difference in mobility is the relatively young age of the state of Israel and how it has changed economically and demographically through 21st century industrialization. Traditionally, there have been three endogenous demographics of Israel. These are Ashkenazi Jews, Mizrahi Jews, and Arabs. As the state of Israel was largely established as a home for Jewish people, immigrants of the religion rapidly migrated to Israel over the course of the 20th century. In terms of numbered population, there were 650,000 Jews in Israel in 1948; however, by 1964 there were over 2 million. There are multiple arguments to how this mobility through industrialization occurred. The "liberal thesis of industrialization" argues that industrialization will provide a higher rate of upward mobility over downward mobility as well as improved social equality. The view favored by marxists opposes the liberal thesis, arguing that while industrialization did create increased social mobility in Israel, it has lessened over time and only remained for select groups of people. Both of these views show that there has indeed been a history of high social mobility in Israel in comparison to other developed countries; however, the absolute distribution and application of this high rate to all citizens is likely not fully universal.

An additional factor in social mobility is education. From the below table, average years of schooling are listed for workers, managers, self-employed, and employers. Because there is a significant difference between self-employed and employers (Owners) and managers, it should be evident that less education does not provide a statistical disadvantage in obtaining higher positions of ownership and consequently higher socioeconomic status.

Mean Years of Schooling by Authority and Ownership
	Without Authority	With Authority	Total
Salaried Employees	Workers 11.24 (528)	Managers 12.35 (419)	11.73 (947)
Owners	Self-Employed 11.13 (113)	Employers 10.85 (80)	11.02 (193)
Total	11.22 (641)	12.11 (499)	11.61 (1140)

In general, Israel is considered a highly educated state and ranks well among modern capitalist countries. The Organization for Economic Co-operation and Development (OECD) ranks Israel 2nd in the world for countries with a percentage of working adults who have achieved tertiary education (46%), significantly higher than the average at 33%. This is likely a significant reason to why social mobility is relatively high in Israel. However, in most recent social mobility has been declining for many and income inequality has been rising. As stated above, high levels of social mobility have not typically been applying to all demographic sectors of Israel, such as Arabs. The four highest-ranked universities in Israel have chosen to combat this in an effort to improve social mobility. As a result, affirmative action exists for these universities. Applicants for affirmative action are college applicant students who are Arabs, women, blacks, or disabled. There are two programs with the intention of increasing social mobility behind this academic affirmative action. First, affirmative action provides some disadvantaged youth with increased chances of attending top-tier university. Second, it gives some college students an advantage into getting to specific prestige programs at their university. The two programs can fundamentally alter and improve the lives of youth in Israel, who may have otherwise earned less prestigious merit from their college experiences or not have gone to college at all. Consequently, the policy of affirmative action delivers recipients with a premium degree that will enable them to enjoy a higher probability of economic success, as well as improving the social perception of different ethnic and gender demographics in Israel as class leaders.

Ethnic occupational mobility in Israel has been viewed as a ladder between the three stratified groups, Ashkenazi Jews, Mizrahi Jews, and Arabs. Higher populations of a group are correlated with larger social communities; therefore, the potential to promote occupational and social mobility are increased. Occupations associated with yielding intergenerational mobility vary. Men in Israel who pursue professional or technical careers are often met with improvement for intergenerational occupational mobility. This is very evident today, with the development of "Silicon Wadi", a cluster of software and other global high tech industries near Tel Aviv. Whereas employment in this sector of Israel is highly associated with mobility, employment in administrative and unskilled occupations are associated with a decline in mobility. For women, service sector occupation and social workers show higher levels of mobility compared to those in agricultural related occupations. In addition, means of social welfare have been instituted to better promote mobility through the provision of housing, education, health care, social services, and employment. These welfare programs were started in the 1970s as a means of combatting stratified ethnic class structure with the intended goal of social mobility. While these programs have prevented critical dangers such as mass hunger or homelessness, it is difficult to prove they have sealed the gap in terms of endogenous ethnic-class structure in Israeli society.

=== Work and leisure time ===
Israeli work hours are long by Western standards. The official Israeli workweek is 43 hours, with employers legally prohibited from compelling employees to work more than 47 hours per week. Among men, the average workweek is 45.8 hours, with the average workweek for women at 37.1 hours. The vast majority of Israeli workers also perform work, largely through answering emails, messages, and phone calls, on evenings, weekends, and vacations, though many do so voluntarily.

In 2011, Israelis received 19 vacation days on average, less than in Europe but more than in the United States. Most Israelis can afford to take vacations abroad. In 2013, 65% of Israelis vacationed abroad.

=== Infrastructure ===
Israel has 42 designated highways and an advanced road network which spans over 17,870 kilometers, including over 230 kilometers of freeway. Israel Railways is Israel's government-owned railway network, which is responsible for all inter city and suburban passenger railways, and for all freight rail traffic in the country. The network is centered in Israel's densely populated coastal plain, and runs through much of the country. The railway has seen investment and growth since the 1990s after decades of neglect and low passenger numbers. There are also six cable car systems, and 47 airports in Israel, as well as seven seaports. Israel also has 176 kilometers of gas pipelines and 261 kilometers of pipelines for refined products. Buses are the country's main form of public transport, and the country has a popular share taxi service. Jerusalem has the country's only tram system – the Jerusalem Light Rail, while a second system, the Tel Aviv Light Rail is under construction. Haifa has the country's only subway system – the Carmelit.

Israel has tapped conventional water resources, but relies heavily on reclaimed water treated in the 120 wastewater treatment plants across the country, and desalinated seawater. 57% of water in Israel is for agriculture, 36% for domestic and public use, and 7% for industrial use. Average domestic water consumption in Israel is 250 liters per person per day, which is higher than in most of Europe, but lower than the United States. According to the Ministry of Environment, 97.9% of all tests of water complied with drinking water standards. Israel also has a modern sanitation system, particularly in major Jewish cities and towns. An estimated 500,000 homes in Israel are not linked to a sewage system, the vast majority of them Arab homes, where waste is expelled into cesspits or the environment.

== Urban life ==
Israel is a highly urbanized nation, with 92 percent of its population living in urban areas. To be granted city status, a municipality must have a population of at least 20,000. There are currently 78 cities in Israel, and 14 of them have populations over 100,000. Other urban municipalities are towns. Towns in Israel are given local council status if they have a population over 2,000.

In urban areas, most residential areas are separated from industrial and commercial zones, and there are also numerous, well-tended parks and playgrounds within the city or town limits.

== Rural life ==
Israelis who live in rural areas primarily live on kibbutzim or moshavim. A kibbutz is a collective community, where the residents work for the benefit of the community. Although many kibbutzim have been privatized, residents typically live communally. Kibbutzim are for the most part self-sufficient, and have their own schools. Most kibbutzim are agricultural, though some have switched to industry.

A moshav is also a collective community, but the land is divided among the residents, who each receive an equal amount, and must grow their own produce. The community is supported by a collective tax, which is equal for all the residents, thus leaving good farmers better off than bad ones.

A moshava is another type of rural agricultural community in Israel, but unlike kibbutzim or moshavim, all the land is privately owned. A moshav shitufi is another type of cooperative village in Israel, where all production and services are handled collectively, while consumption decisions remain the responsibilities of individual households.

Communal settlements are rural or exurban towns where the entire population is organized in a cooperative, and can veto the sale of any home or property to an undesirable buyer, typically work outside the town, and must pay only a small property tax to sustain the town and its public facilities. Most homes are single-family homes, although some have apartments. Due to the rigorous selection process when selling property, most residents of a communal settlement share a single shared ideology, religious perspective, desired lifestyle, and some will only accept young couples with children.

== See also ==
- Economy of Israel
- Human Development Index
- Poverty threshold
