= Ministry of Intelligence (Israel) =

Government ministry of Israel

- משרד המודיעין
- Emblem of Israel

Agency overview
- Formed: 6 May 2009
- Dissolved: 18 March 2024

The Ministry of Intelligence (Hebrew: משרד המודיעין, Misrad HaModi'in) was a government ministry in Israel. It oversaw policies related to the operation of the intelligence organizations, the Mossad and the Shabak (Israel Security Agency), in support of the national security of the State of Israel, in coordination with and under the guidance of the prime minister.

== History ==
The Ministry of Intelligence was established in 2009 to coordinate between the various agencies in the Israeli Intelligence Community, including the Mossad, Shin Bet, Aman, and the Israeli Foreign Ministry's intelligence gathering operations.

The Ministry of Intelligence was based on the model of the United States' Office of the Director of National Intelligence. It is charged with maintaining contact with the intelligence organizations and ensuring that they execute the directives of the political echelon; examining the structure of the intelligence organizations and initiating and leading plans for their improvement; formulating a work plan for the intelligence community, in coordination with the heads of all its members; designing and synchronizing national projects that relate to the intelligence community in its entirety; acting as a mediator between the heads of the various organizations in the intelligence community; drafting recommendations for the Prime Minister when needed; and performing budgetary oversight for the intelligence organizations.

In addition, the Ministry of Intelligence develops and creates national-civilian intelligence, which deals with broader aspects of national security. This intelligence supports planning and strategic decision-making processes in all government ministries by linking security aspects with civilian ones.

As part of its involvement in national-civilian intelligence, the Ministry of Intelligence established the inter-ministerial and inter-organizational forum, "Line of Horizon Forum", whose members include representatives of government ministries, intelligence and defense establishments, civilian organizations and researchers. The forum serves as the basis for a mechanism that is currently being built in the Ministry to look ahead, and it includes researchers and a technological laboratory that provide assistance to decision-makers on the national level.

During the Gaza war, a Ministry paper dated October 13, "Policy paper: Options for a policy regarding Gaza's civilian population", recommending forcibly transferring Gaza Strip's 2.3 million residents to Egypt's Sinai Peninsula, was leaked to the media. This triggered a negative international reaction, being widely described as "advocacy for ethnic cleansing". Several weeks later, on November 19, 2023, in an opinion piece in The Jerusalem Post, minister of Intelligence Gila Gamliel backed the voluntary resettlement of Gazans outside the Gaza Strip, which she said members of the Knesset across the political spectrum supported.

Amidst unplanned expenses due to the Gaza war, the Israeli Finance Ministry in January 2024 proposed closing the Intelligence Ministry along with nine other ministries. According to Haaretz, the ministry had not fulfilled its main purpose and was often a job given to senior MJs for whom there were no suitable ministries.

In March 2024, the Israeli cabinet approved abolishing the Intelligence Ministry and moving its functions to the Prime Minister's Office. Sitting minister Gila Gamliel became the Science and Technology Minister, replacing Ofir Akunis.

== List of ministers ==
#	Minister	Party	Government	Term start	Term end
1	Dan Meridor	Likud	32	6 May 2009	18 March 2013
2	Yuval Steinitz	Likud	33	18 March 2013	14 May 2015
3	Israel Katz	Likud	34	14 May 2015	17 May 2020
4	Eli Cohen	Likud	35	17 May 2020	13 June 2021
5	Elazar Stern	Yesh Atid	36	13 June 2021	29 December 2022
6	Yariv Levin	Likud	37	29 December 2022	2 January 2023
7	Gila Gamliel	Likud	37	2 January 2023	13 March 2024
