= Options for a policy regarding Gaza's civilian population =

2023 Israeli intelligence research paper

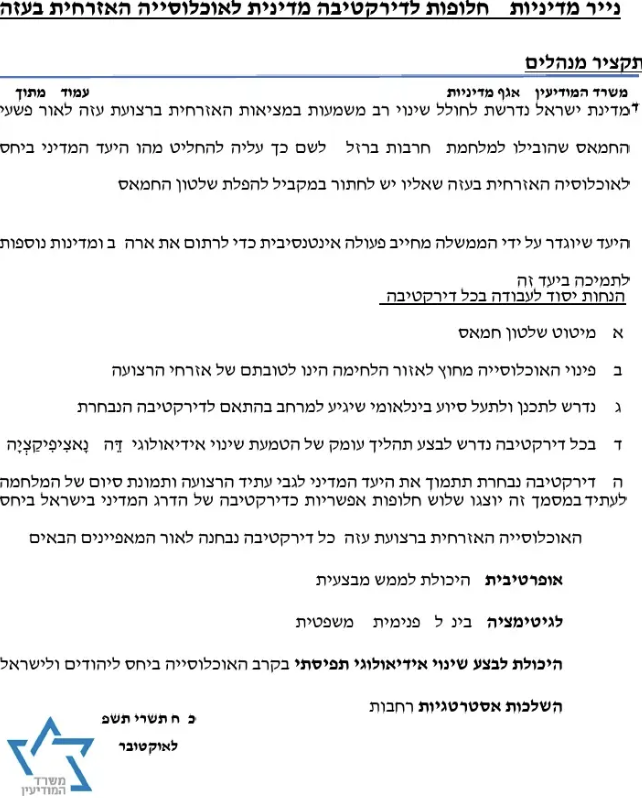
The leaked document

"Policy paper: Options for a policy regarding Gaza's civilian population" (Hebrew: נייר מדיניות : חלופות לדירקטיבה מדינית לאוכלוסייה האזרחית בעזה, dated 13 October 2023) is a policy paper drafted by the Israeli Intelligence Ministry after the October 7 attack. The paper considered policy options to protect Israel's security interests, including allowing the Palestinian Authority to rule Gaza and allowing a new local government to develop there, and ultimately recommended the transfer of Palestinians to the Sinai Peninsula.

The Israeli government downplayed the paper as a hypothetical "concept paper", and said there was "no substantive discussion" of the paper with security officials. The paper was condemned by Palestinians. "Option C", favored by the report, was widely described as amounting to ethnic cleansing.

== Content ==
The paper, entitled "Policy paper: Options for a policy regarding Gaza’s civilian population", was prepared by the Israeli Ministry of Intelligence, headed by Gila Gamliel. It is ten pages long and dated October 13, 2023, six days after the 2023 Hamas attack on Israel.

The paper offers three alternatives "to effect a significant change in the civilian reality in the Gaza Strip in light of the Hamas crimes that led to the Gaza war."

=== Option A ===
The first alternative proposed in the paper, entitle "Option A", proposes reinstating the sovereignty of the Palestinian Authority in Gaza. The paper rejects this alternative because it would be ineffective in deterring attacks against Israel, and it would be "an unprecedented victory of the Palestinian national movement, a victory that will claim the lives of thousands of Israeli civilians and soldiers, and does not safeguard Israel's security". The paper states this alternative is the "option with the most risks".

=== Option B ===
The second alternative in the paper, Option B, creating a new local regime in Gaza as an alternative to Hamas, is also rejected as ineffective in deterring attacks against Israel, among other reasons.

=== Option C ===
The third alternative, Option C, proposes transferring Gaza Strip's 2.3 million residents to Egypt's Sinai Peninsula. The paper proposes accomplishing the population transfer in three stages. First, the establishment of tent cities in Sinai southwest of the Gaza Strip, followed by the creation of an undefined humanitarian corridor, and finally the construction of permanent cities in northern Sinai. A security zone several kilometers wide between Israel and Egypt would block displaced Palestinians from returning. The paper does not address what would happen to Gaza Strip after the proposed resettlement.

The paper states that many residents in Gaza have asked to leave Gaza, and suggests a campaign promoting the plan to the residents of Gaza, with slogans such as "Allah made sure that you lost this land because of the leadership of Hamas – there is no choice but to move to another place with the help of your Muslim brothers."

The paper suggests Egypt, Turkey, Qatar, Saudi Arabia, or the United Arab Emirates could support the plan financially, or by taking in Palestinian refugees as citizens. Canada is also identified as a possible resettlement location for refugees, due to its "lenient" immigration practices.

The paper states that Egypt would be obligated by international law to allow the population transfer, and suggests the United States should pressure Egypt and other countries into accepting refugees.

The paper states that this alternative is the preferred alternative, because it is best for Israel's security, and "will yield positive and long-term strategic results".

The paper acknowledges that this proposal "is liable to be complicated in terms of international legitimacy", and states, "In our assessment, fighting after the population is evacuated would lead to fewer civilian casualties compared to what could be expected if the population were to remain."

== Release and reception ==
The existence of the paper was first reported by Calcalist on October 24, 2023. It was published in full for the first time by Local Call (Sicha Mekomit, Hebrew language edition of +972 Magazine) on October 28, 2023. The paper was not intended to be released to the public or the press. According to an unidentified Israeli official, there was "no substantive discussion" of the paper within the government.

Israeli Prime Minister Benjamin Netanyahu downplayed the report, calling it a hypothetical "concept paper".

The paper worsened Israeli–Egyptian tensions, and drew condemnation from Palestinians, for whom it revived memories of the Nakba.

== See also ==
- Crimes against humanity
- List of towns and villages depopulated during the 1947–1949 Palestine war
- Rehavam Ze'evi, Moledet, and Assassination of Rehavam Ze'evi
- What Russia Should Do with Ukraine
- Gaza genocide
