= Persons Disabled in War against the Nazis Law =

Israeli law

The Persons Disabled in War against the Nazis Law is an Israeli law, providing assistance to Israelis who fought in the armed forces of the allied countries or partisan units during World War II and who are disabled (physically or mentally) as a consequence of the war. Moreover, the law provides entitlements for surviving spouses of beneficiaries, for a limited period of time or until they remarry, depending on the extent of disability recognized for the original beneficiary shortly before his or her death.

The law came about after campaigning from groups of veterans of the Second World War, being passed by the Knesset in 1954. However, the law does not confer World War II veterans the same benefits as veterans who has served in military service of the State of Israel. The benefits under this law are handled by the Ministry of Finance, not the Ministry of Defense.
