= Liora Meridor =

Israeli economist

- ליאורה מרידור

Chair of the Board of Governors of Tel Aviv University
- In office 8 March 2009 – September 2011
- Preceded by: Dov Lautman
- Succeeded by: Giora Yaron

Personal details
- Born: 7 December 1947 Jerusalem, Mandatory Palestine
- Died: 13 November 2023 (aged 75)
- Resting place: Har HaMenuchot, Jerusalem
- Spouse: Dan Meridor (m. 1973)
- Education: Hebrew University of Jerusalem

Liora Meridor (Hebrew: ליאורה מרידור; 7 December 1947 – 13 November 2023) was an Israeli economist.

== Early life and education ==
Liora Meridor was born in 1947 in Jerusalem. In 1950, Meridor moved to Tel Aviv with her parents. She attended Ironi Alef High School.

From 1966 to 1967, Meridor served in the Israel Defense Forces.

== Career ==
=== Board of Governors of Tel Aviv University ===
Meridor was Chair of the Board of Governors of Tel Aviv University from 8 March 2009 to September 2011.

== Personal life ==
Meridor married Dan Meridor in October 1973 during the Yom Kippur War. They had four children.

In June 2012, Meridor and her husband sustained minor injuries in a road traffic accident and received medical treatment at Hadassah Medical Center.
