= Sallai Meridor =

Israeli politician

- סלי מרידור
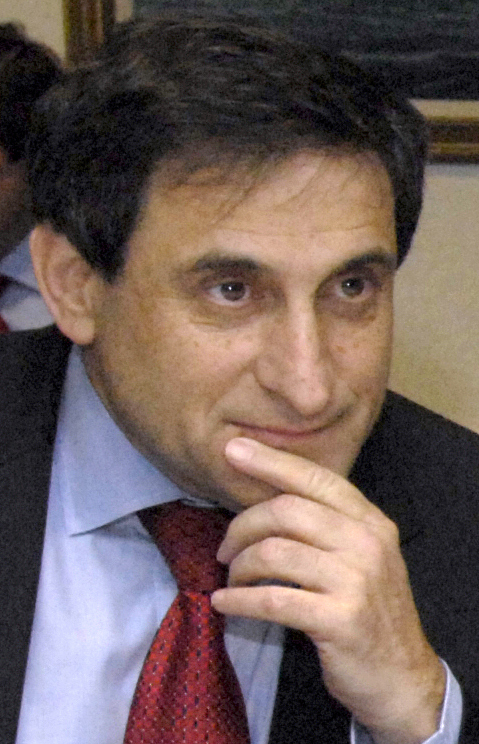

Israeli Ambassador to the United States
- In office 2006–2009
- Preceded by: Daniel Ayalon
- Succeeded by: Michael Oren

Personal details
- Born: 1955 (age 70–71) Jerusalem
- Education: Hebrew University of Jerusalem

Sallai Meridor (Hebrew: סלי מרידור; born 1955) is an Israeli politician. He was the Israeli Ambassador to the United States between 2005–2009, appointed by Prime Minister Ehud Olmert.

== Career ==
Meridor was an aide to Moshe Arens when he was the Foreign Minister of Israel in the late 1980s.

Meridor served as the Chairman of the Jewish Agency for Israel and the World Zionist Organization from 1999–2005, Treasurer of the Jewish Agency and WZO and as the Head of the Settlement Division of the WZO. Meridor also serves as the international chairman for the Jerusalem Foundation.

== Family ==
Meridor's father was Eliyahu Meridor, the Commander of the Irgun (Etzel) and member of Knesset.

Meridor's older brother Dan Meridor was a minister in several Israeli governments. His two other older siblings are Haggit Hurvitz, Head of Pediatrics at the Bikur Holim Hospital, and Avital Darmon, Director of the Applied Research Initiative in Education.

Dan Meirdor's son is Shaul Meridor, the deputy director of the Allocation Branch at the Ministry of Finance. Another nephew of Sallai Meridor is Eli Hurvitz (Meridor), son of Haggit Hurvitz, and the executive director of the Eddie and Jules Trump Foundation.

== See also ==
- List of Israeli ambassadors to the United States
- Israel-United States relations
- Jewish Agency for Israel
