= Giora Yaron =

Israeli doctor of physics and businessman

- גיורא ירון
- Born: 1948 (age 77–78); Manara, Israel
- Education: Hebrew University of Jerusalem (BA, PhD)
- Occupation: Businessman
- Known for: Founder of Itamar Medical; co-founder of P-Cube and Qwilt
- Title: Chairman of the Board, Tel Aviv University
- Spouse: Zila Yaron (died 2024)

Giora Yaron (Hebrew: גיורא ירון; born 1948) is a doctor of physics, businessman, and chairman of the board of directors of the Tel Aviv University.

== Early years ==
Yaron was born in Kibbutz, Manara to Dan and Giza Yaron. In the IDF, Yaron served in the 12th Battalion (Barak) of the Golani Brigade, and completed an officers' course. He holds a BA (Graduated summa cum laude) in Physics and Mathematics and a PhD in applied physics from the Hebrew University. In 1992, he managed the Indigo digital printing company (founded by Benny Landa) in Ness Ziona, and in 1994 led it to an IPO on NASDAQ.

== Establishment of companies ==
- Itamar Medical – 1997-2022, founder and chairman.
- P-Cube – 1999-2004, co-founder and chairman.
- Qwilt – 2010-Today, co-founder and board member.
- Hyperwise- Founding Investor and board member.
- Siraj Technologies – 2017-Today, co-founder and chairman.

== Business exits ==
Yaron was involved in a few exits. such as:

- Comsys - Part of Comsys was sold to Conexant (1996). The other part was sold to Texas Instruments (2005).
- P-Cube - sold to Cisco(2004).
- Qumranet - sold to Red Hat (2008)
- Hyperwise - sold to Check Point (2015)

== Past and present senior positions ==
- Chairman of the Board of Directors of the Tel Aviv University (2010-2018)
- Chairman of the Board of Directors of Itamar Medical (since 1997)
- Member of the Board of Directors of Amdocs (since 2009)
- Member of the Advisory Committee to the Minister of Defense on technological aspects of commemoration
- Member of the Board of Directors of Qwilt, Excelero, Equalum.

== Personal life ==
Yaron lives in Caesarea. His wife Zila passed away in 2024. In her memory, he established the Zila Yaron Prize, awarded to an Israeli artist who lives and works in Israel.
