= Eliyahu Meridor =

Israeli politician

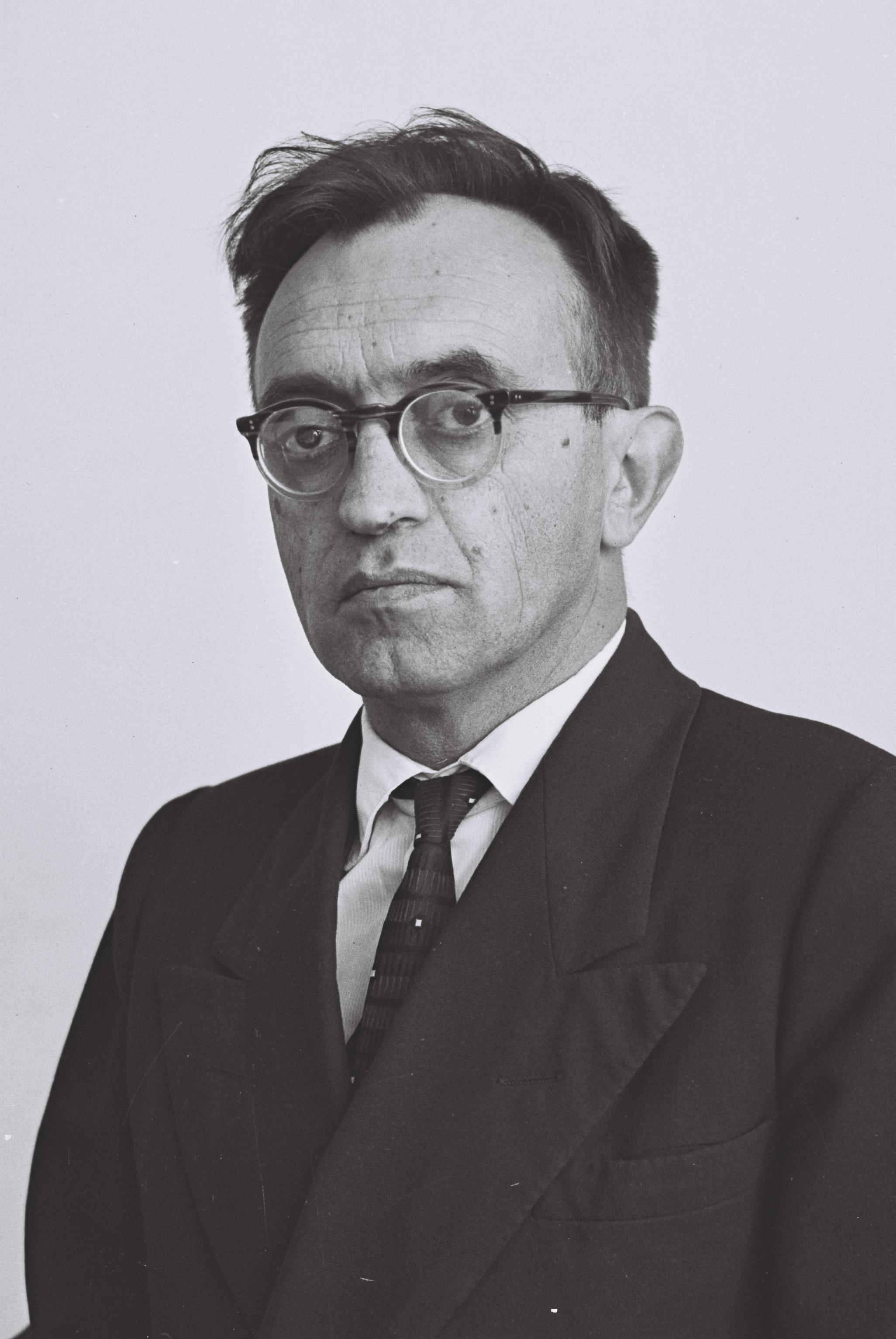
- Meridor in 1959

Faction represented in the Knesset
- 1959–1965: Herut
- 1965–1966: Gahal

Personal details
- Born: 20 July 1914 Saint Petersburg, Russian Empire
- Died: 16 October 1966 (aged 52)

Eliyahu Meridor (Hebrew: אליהו מרידור; 20 July 1914 – 16 October 1966) was an Israeli politician who served as a member of the Knesset for Herut and Gahal from 1959 until his death in 1966. He had no family relationship to Irgun commander Ya'akov Meridor, born Viniarsky.

== Biography ==
Born Elijhu Wierzbolowski on 20 July 1914 in Saint Petersburg in the Russian Empire (now in Russia), Meridor was educated at a Tarbut school in Grajewo in Poland, before studying law at the University of Warsaw. He also became a member of the local branch of Betar. In 1936 he emigrated to Mandatory Palestine, where he worked as a lawyer. He joined the Irgun, and was a commander in Jerusalem, as well as being a member of the organisation's command. He was arrested by the British authorities and exiled to Africa.

In 1948 he was amongst the founders of the Herut movement, and chaired its Jerusalem branch. In 1959 he was elected to the Knesset on the party's list. He was re-elected in 1961 and 1965, but died in 1966 at the age of 52. His seat was taken by Shlomo Cohen-Tzidon.

Meridor had four children; Dan, also a politician, Haggit (Hurvitz), Head of Pediatrics at the Bikur Holim Hospital, Avital (Darmon), Director of the Applied Research Initiative in Education, and Sallai, former chairman of the Jewish Agency and Israeli ambassador to the United States between 2006 and 2009. His grandchildren included Eli Hurvitz, executive director of the Trump Foundation, and Shaul Meridor, deputy director of Allocation at the Ministry of Finance.

A street in Pisgat Ze'ev (East) is named after him.
