= Psagot Investment House =

Israeli investment firm

Psagot Investment House (Hebrew: פסגות בית השקעות) is an Israeli investment firm. The company owns Psagot Securities, a member of the Tel Aviv Stock Exchange, and Psagot Equity.

Psagot Securities provides securities trading services and operates Psagot Trade, an advanced trading platform for independent investors. The firm also offers institutional brokerage, trust services, credit solutions, and customized investment management.

The controlling shareholders of Psagot include the Sigma Clarity Group, led by Yoan Kadoche; the Carmel Credit Group, led by Uzi Danino and Ronen Torem; and the Psagot Equity Group, led by Tsachi Eiron and Omer Yaniv.

== History ==
Psagot Investment House Ltd.

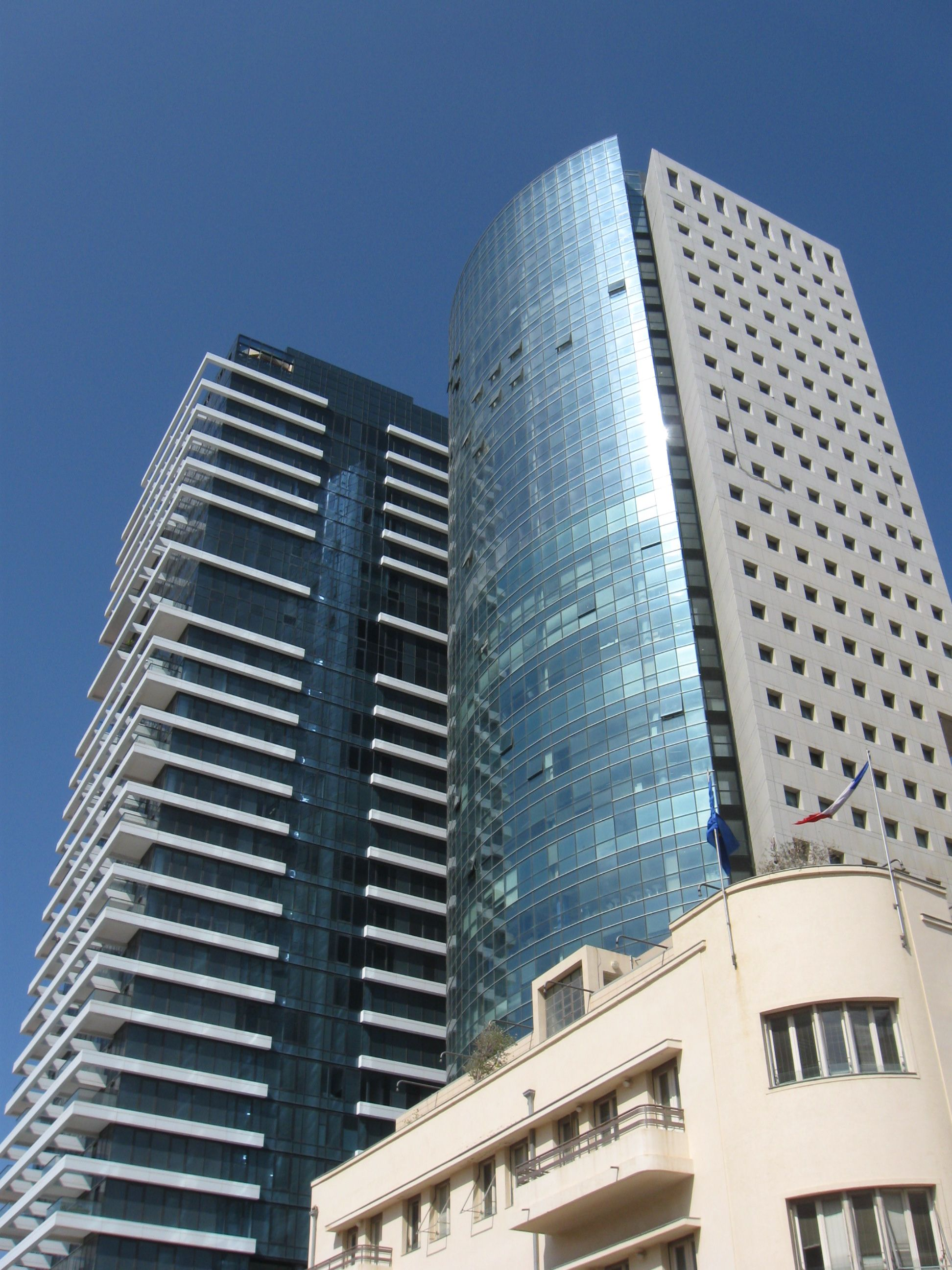
- Psagot Tower in Tel Aviv (on the right)
- Native name: פסגות בית השקעות
- Type: Private
- Industry: Financial services
- Predecessor: Ofek Securities and Investments (founded 1969); Psagot Mutual Funds (Founded (1989)
- Founded: 1963
- Founder: Bank Leumi
- Headquarters: Tel Aviv, Israel
- Key people: Yohan Kadoche - Executive Chairman of the board Tsachi Iron - CEO Ronen Torem -Chairman of the Board, Psagot Securities Omer Yaniv - Founder and CEO, Psagot Equity
- Services: Self-directed Trading, Trust management, Institutional brokerage and Equity Compensation
- Owner: Sigma Clarity Group, led by Yoan Kadoche; Carmel Credit Group, led by Uzi Danino and Ronen Torem; Psagot Equity Group, led by Tsachi Iron and Omer Yaniv
- Number of employees: 110
- Website: www.psagot.co.il

Psagot Investment House was established in 1963 by Bank Leumi, making it the oldest investment house in Israel.

In 2005, subsequent to the Bachar Reform, Bank Leumi finalized the sale of Psagot to York Capital Management, a New York-based investment firm. York Capital sold its stake in the company (76%) to Apax Partners in 2010. At $576 million, the Apax takeover of Psagot was Israel's largest private equity deal in 2010.

Under the direction of Roy Vermus as CEO beginning in 2006, Psagot grew to become Israel's largest investment firm through a series of strategic fund acquisitions. It acquired a provident fund managing NIS20 billion in assets from Prisma Investment House Ltd. in 2009 and made its first major pension fund acquisition in 2010 after outbidding a competitor for control of the Histadrut Leumit fund, which managed NIS6 billion in assets. In addition, Vermus shut down Psagot's underwriting unit. Forbes Israel ranked Vermus the fourth most influential young Israeli in 2008.

According to Dun's 100, an annual Israeli business ranking, Psagot was the largest investment house in Israel in 2017, managing NIS 185 billion in assets for over one million private clients. By the end of 2018, the firm managed NIS 177 billion, decreasing to approximately NIS 175 billion in July 2020 and approximately NIS 165 billion by January 2021.

In June 2021, Rani Zim, through Value Capital, acquired the investment house and its subsidiaries from Apex Capital, excluding the provident and pension fund activities, which were merged into Altshuler Shaham. Following this separation, Psagot's assets under management (AUM) stood at approximately NIS 90 billion, decreasing further to approximately NIS 58 billion by August 30, 2021.

In August 2022, Value Capital changed its name to "Psagot Group for Finance and Investments," reflecting its control over the "Psagot" brand, and traded under this name on the stock exchange. During this period, Daniel Leventhal served as both Chairman and CEO of the group. In January 2023, the company sold its mutual funds (managing NIS 17.1 billion) and its investment portfolio management activity to The Phoenix Group for over NIS 300 million.

In December 2024, ownership of Psagot Investment House was sold by "Psagot Group for Finance and Investments" — which subsequently reverted to its former name, Value Capital One Ltd. — to a private group of investors. Since then, Psagot has operated as a private entity.

== Management ==
- Yohan Kadoche – Executive Chairman of the Board, Psagot Investment House
- Tsachi Iron, (CPA) – CEO, Psagot Investment House
- Ronen Torem – Chairman of the Board, Psagot Securities
- Omer Yaniv, (ADV, CPA) - CEO, Psagot Equity

== ISA investigations ==
In 2003, when Psagot was still owned by Bank Leumi, the Israel Securities Authority launched an investigation into the firm's dealings for suspected violations of the Regulation of Investment Advice and Investment Portfolio Management Law (1995). The investigation went on for a year and culminated in a raid of Psagot's offices and the taking in of the firm's executives for questioning in late 2004. The impetus for the investigation was a Psagot fund having raised NIS1.7 billion in a single day. Psagot founder and general manager Gabriella Ravid resigned along with her deputy in late 2006. In 2008 Bank Leumi agreed to pay a fine of NIS25 million as part of a plea bargain agreement.

In 2010 police arrested three senior Psagot employees on charges that they were involved in manipulating the prices of government and corporate bonds in order to redound greater profits to the firm and inflate their bonuses in the years 2007–2009. An investigation conducted by the ISA concluded with Psagot agreeing to pay a fine of NIS150 million as part of a plea bargain. Psagot CEO at the time, Roy Vermus, was subsequently compelled to resign from the firm after the Supreme Court rejected an appeal he filed against his forced ouster from the company.

== See also ==
- Economy of Israel
- Venture capital in Israel
