= Bituah Leumi =

National social security agency in Israel

National Insurance Institute
- המוסד לביטוח לאומי
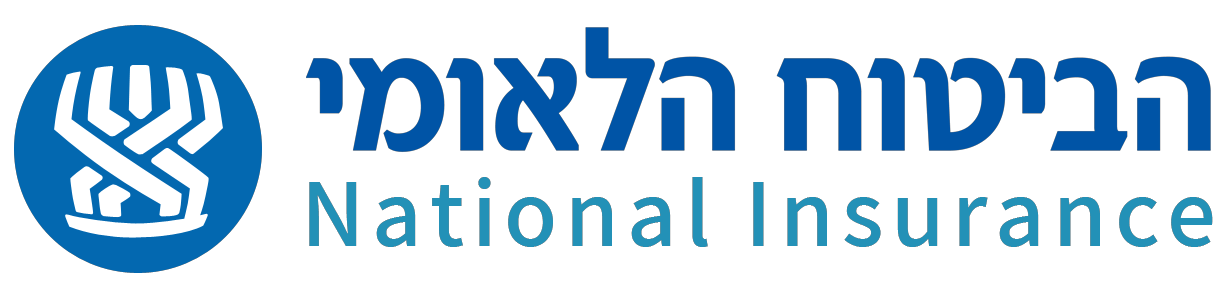

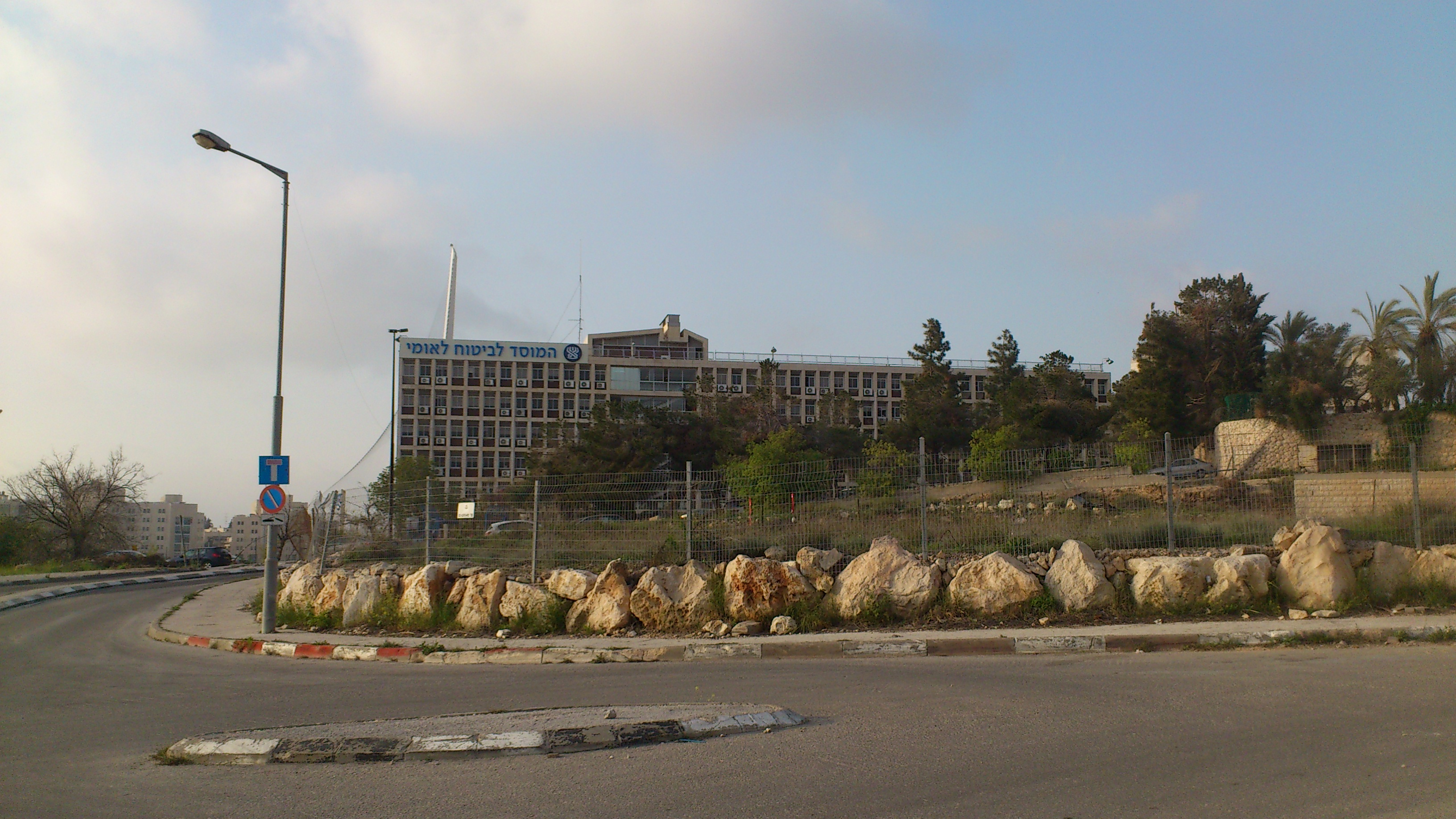
- Headquarters

Agency overview
- Formed: 1 April 1954
- Jurisdiction: Government of Israel
- Headquarters: 13 Avraham Shapira str, Jerusalem; 31°47′19″N 35°12′8″E
- Agency executive: Director-General
- Parent agency: Ministry of Finance
- Website: btl.gov.il

Bituah Leumi (Hebrew: המוסד לביטוח לאומי, HaMossad LeBituach Leumi, the National Insurance Institute of Israel) is Israel's national social security agency.

== History ==
Bituah Leumi was established in April 1954. It collects health insurance contributions which are transferred to the various sick funds, and National Insurance contributions, for which both employers and employees are liable. Those paid below 60% of the average wage – 6,164 Israeli new shekels - pay a reduced rate. Contributions are paid as a percentage of income up to a maximum, which is uprated every year in line with the consumer price index.

Israeli residents over the age of 18 must pay monthly National Insurance contributions with the exception of Israel Defense Forces soldiers, National Service volunteers, students enrolled in vocational training courses, housewives whose husbands pay, people who became resident in Israel after they reached a specified age, Israeli residents living in a country with a reciprocal agreement with Israel, where they pay social security contributions, and new immigrants, for their first 12 months.

In January 2021 the institution published a report on poverty and inequality in Israel, which showed that 1,980,309 Israelis lived below the poverty line in 2020 - 23% of Israeli citizens and 31.7% of Israeli children. In the Jewish population, the proportion was 17.7%, and in the ultra-Orthodox sector 49%. In the Arab population, it was 35.8%. Unemployment benefits alone rescued 23.6% of families from poverty, compared to 2% in 2019.

== Benefits ==
=== Children ===
Monthly child allowance for all children with special benefits for children whose parent was killed by a spouse and benefits for disabled children.

=== Adults ===
Disability pensions and attendance allowance to individuals who have lost the ability to earn a living due to medical disability, individuals whose earning capacity has dropped by at least 50%, and homemakers whose ability to perform household tasks has decreased by at least 50%. The monthly pension rate is determined by the degree of disability. There are six levels of long-term care benefit and recipients can choose between cash benefits and long-term care services.

Accident injury benefits, for up to 90 days, and may be followed by a work disability benefit.

Women and children who have a court judgment for maintenance payments, but are not getting them.

Maternity and paternity allowances and a birth or adoption grant.

Grants for widows, widowers and orphans.

Old-age pensions for citizens, permanent residents and olim who were 60 at most when they arrived in the country.

=== Burial ===
Burial expenses for everyone who dies and is buried in Israel, and for residents who die abroad.

=== Compensation ===
Compensation for blood transfusion, scalp ringworm and polio victims. Additional benefits are payable under the Fallen Soldiers Families Law for the families of victims of hostilities and under the Benefits for Prisoners of Zion and their Families Law of 1992.

=== Income support ===
Income support is payable to those who are incapable of work, and Income supplement to those whose income from work or other sources is insufficient. Unemployment benefit is payable for a maximum of 175 days depending on the number of dependents.

== See also ==
- Economy of Israel
- Standard of living in Israel
- Taxation in Israel
