= Dan Meridor =

Israeli politician (born 1947)

- דן מרידור
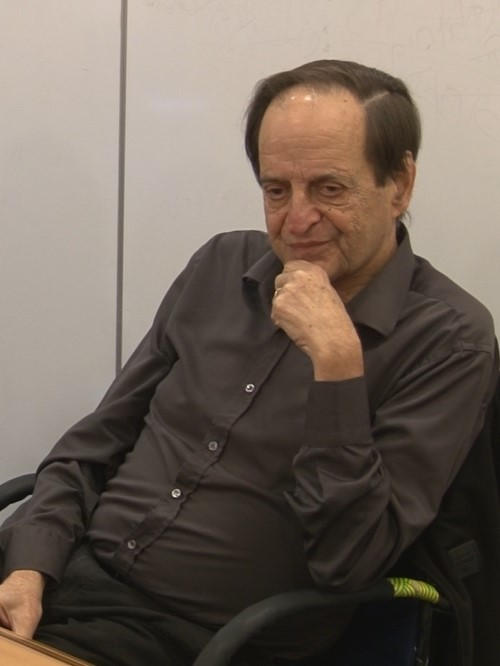
- Meridor in 2024

Ministerial roles
- 1988–1992: Minister of Justice
- 1996–1997: Minister of Finance
- 2001–2003: Minister without Portfolio
- 2009–2013: Deputy Prime Minister
- 2009–2013: Minister of Intelligence and Atomic Energy

Faction represented in the Knesset
- 1984–1999: Likud
- 1999–2003: Center Party
- 2009–2013: Likud

Personal details
- Born: 23 April 1947 (age 79) Jerusalem, Mandatory Palestine

Dan Meridor (Hebrew: דן מרידור; born 23 April 1947) is an Israeli politician and minister. A longtime member of the Likud party, in the late 1990s he became one of the founders of the Center Party. He rejoined Likud a decade later, and returned to the Knesset following the 2009 elections. Meridor served at various times as Deputy Prime Minister, Minister of Finance, Minister of Justice and Minister of Intelligence and Atomic Energy in the Israeli Cabinet. In 2014, Meridor succeeded Avi Primor as president of the Israel Council on Foreign Relations, an institute of international affairs which operates under the auspices of the World Jewish Congress.

== Biography ==
Born in Jerusalem towards the end of the Mandate era, Meridor is the son of Eliyahu Meridor, a longtime political associate of Menachem Begin in the Irgun and Herut (which he represented in the Knesset), and Ra'anana Meridor, an associate professor of Classics at the Hebrew University of Jerusalem.

He was drafted into the IDF in 1965 to the air force academy, and after two months was transferred to the armored corps where he served as a tank commander. He then studied law at the Hebrew University of Jerusalem, gaining an LL.B. He then worked as an attorney at the Tel Aviv law firm of Haim Zadok & Co.

=== Political career ===
After serving as Cabinet Secretary between 1982 and 1984 (under Begin and Yitzhak Shamir), Meridor ran for the Knesset in the Likud list for the 1984 election. As a freshman member, he was appointed chairman of two legislative subcommittees. He was re-elected in 1988, and was appointed Minister of Justice in Shamir's unity government of 1988–90 and in Shamir's Likud government of 1990–92. He retained his seat in the 1992 and 1996 elections, and was appointed Minister of Finance by Benjamin Netanyahu in 1996.

After successive clashes with Netanyahu, Meridor left the cabinet in June 1997. His public image suffered during that period, when he was compared to Hamlet (for his indecisiveness) and to a fraidy cat on a popular TV show, Hartzufim.

In 1998, together with several other Likud and Labor Party members, he co-founded Israel in the Centre, which later became the Center Party. He was elected as a Centre Party MK in the 1999 elections, and was appointed chairman of the Knesset's Foreign Affairs and Defense Committee. After Ariel Sharon became Prime Minister in 2001, Meridor was made a Minister without Portfolio. During his time in the Knesset he also served as the Knesset observer to the Council of Europe.

Meridor lost his seat following the 2003 elections.

After leaving the Knesset, Meridor served as international chair of the Jerusalem Foundation.

In the run-up to the 2006 elections, Meridor received offers by Labor and Yisrael Beiteinu, but he seemed to harbor hopes of being called to Kadima's list. However, his inclusion was vetoed by Ariel Sharon's sons, Gilad and Omri Sharon. He later rejoined Likud, and won seventeenth place on the party's list for the 2009 elections. He returned to the Knesset after the party won 27 seats. In the Netanyahu cabinet formed after that election, Meridor was appointed Minister of Intelligence and Atomic Energy, and Deputy Prime Minister.

Meridor ran in the Likud primaries for the 2013 elections, but he failed to win a realistic place on the Likud list.

== Family ==
Meridor's father was Eliyahu Meridor, a member of the Knesset.

Meridor's wife Liora (1947–2023) was a senior economist and held several posts in the Bank of Israel, the private sector, and government-sponsored panels. They had four children. Their son Shaul Meridor was the deputy director of the Allocation Branch at the Ministry of Finance until 2020.

Dan Meridor has three younger siblings. Haggit Hurvitz is Head of Pediatrics at the Bikur Holim Hospital. Avital Darmon is Director of the Applied Research Initiative in Education. Sallai Meridor was Chairman of the Jewish Agency for Israel and the World Zionist Organization from 1999 to 2005 and was appointed as Israeli ambassador to the United States in 2006.
