= Yuval Steinitz =

Israeli politician (born 1958)

- יובל שטייניץ
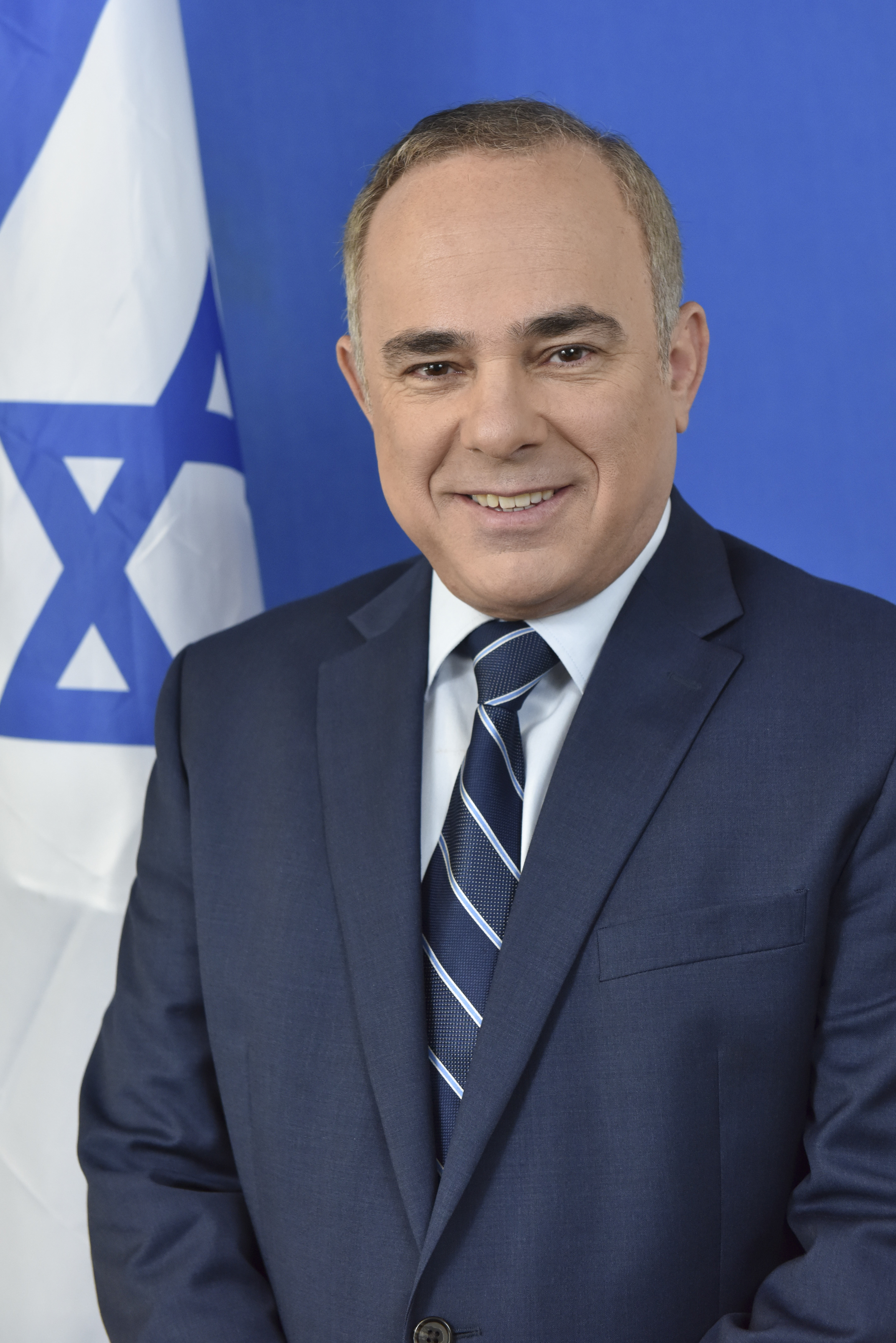

Ministerial roles
- 2009–2013: Minister of Finance
- 2013–2015: Minister of Intelligence
- 2013–2015: Minister of International Relations
- 2013–2015: Minister of Strategic Affairs
- 2015–2021: Minister of National Infrastructure, Energy & Water Resources

Faction represented in the Knesset
- 1999–2022: Likud

Personal details
- Born: 10 April 1958 (age 68) Ramot HaShavim, Israel

Yuval Steinitz (Hebrew: יובל שטייניץ; born 10 April 1958) is an Israeli politician who served as a member of the Knesset for the Likud party. He also held several ministerial posts, including Minister of Finance, Minister of Intelligence, Minister of Strategic Affairs and Minister of Energy. Steinitz holds a PhD in philosophy and has been a senior lecturer at the University of Haifa. His book "Invitation to Philosophy", was published in 74 editions and printings and considered the best-selling philosophy book in the history of the State of Israel. Steinitz currently serves as chairman of the board of Rafael Advanced Defense Systems.

== Biography ==
Born and raised in Moshav Ramot HaShavim, 30 km north of Tel Aviv, he is the eldest of four children. His father, Dan, is an engineer and his late mother, Mina, was a teacher of literature and philosophy. Steinitz served in the IDF as a soldier in Golani infantry Brigade (1977–1980). He sustained a leg injury during a battle with the Syrian army when he served as a reservist, during the 1982 Lebanon War.

=== Academic work ===
After three years of compulsory military service, he was awarded BA and MA in philosophy at the Hebrew University of Jerusalem with honors. His doctoral thesis From a Rational Point of View was completed at the Cohn Institute for the History and Philosophy of Science and Ideas at Tel Aviv University. The thesis examined the possibility of logical arguments for the existence of God, and the rule of logical reasoning in modern science. In 1993 Steinitz was awarded the Alon Scholarship, the most prestigious award for outstanding young doctors in Israel, which led to a teaching position at the University of Haifa. Steinitz was chosen two years in a row as "The outstanding Lecturer" in philosophy and the philosophy of science. In 1996 he was appointed Senior Lecturer (the Israeli parallel of a tenured assistant professor).

Steinitz has published several philosophy books. The first, Invitation to Philosophy (1987), became a number one best-selling philosophy book in Israeli history, and was printed in 60 editions. Another book, A Logical-Scientific Missile to God and Back became a best seller as well and was printed in 17 editions. He also published philosophical papers in academic journals including The Philosophical Quarterly, American Philosophical Quarterly, International Philosophical Quarterly, Cambridge Religious Studies, and The Jerusalem Philosophical Quarterly Iyyun.

== Political career ==
Steinitz's political involvement began in the early 1980s when he joined the 'Peace Now' movement as a young student. He was injured in his leg (the same leg again) during an anti-government rally outside the Prime Minister's Officer in Jerusalem in 1983, when a right-wing extremist hurled a hand-grenade into the crowd, killing peace activist Emil Grunzweig. Steinitz's reservations about Oslo Accords signed with the Palestinians, together with his concerns regarding the massive Egyptian military buildup despite the peace treaty with Israel, led him to shift to the right in 1995 and to publicly support the Likud Party.

=== 15th Knesset (1999–2003) ===
In 1999 he was elected to the 15th Knesset on the Likud list. A year later he became a member of the Foreign Affairs and Defense Committee and the chairman of its "Subcommittee on Defense Planning and Policy" and a member of the Constitution and Law Committee.

In 1999–2004, he served as president of Israel's Media Watch.

=== 16th Knesset (2003–2006) ===
After being reelected to the 16th Knesset, he became chairman of Foreign Affairs and Defense Committee, chairman of the "Subcommittee on Intelligence and Secret Service" and co-chairman of the "Joint Committee on Defense with the US Congress", which he established and chaired together with Senator Jon Kyl. Right at the beginning of his tenure, Steinitz declared that the committee will cease to be "The House of Lords" and will exercise "a very proactive and effective parliamentary oversight of Israel defense establishment". This new approach has led him to a series of clashes with Prime Minister Ariel Sharon, with Minister of Defense Shaul Mofaz and with IDF Chief of Staff Moshe Ya'alon.

A few months later, he established the "Investigation Committee for the Israeli Intelligence following the Iraq War" and appointed himself as its chairman. This was followed later on by the establishment of similar committees in the United States and the United Kingdom. The committee report in 2004 sharply criticized the Israeli Intelligence Community for misleading alerting reports, following its failure to detect the non-existence of chemical weapons and ballistic missiles in Iraq before the war. Additionally, the report also criticized the failure of the Israeli intelligence to detect the Libyan nuclear program on time. The committee's public report included a number of specific recommendations:

- Consider removing SIGINT Unit 8200 from the IDF's and transform it into a civilian SIGINT authority.
- Accelerate the development of the Israeli spy satellites program, operated together by the IDF and the Mossad.
- Providing a special program of advanced academic studies for young intelligence officers, that will include, among other areas, some philosophical background. This recommendation was implemented with the establishment of the BA and MA "Havatzalot Program".
- Appointing a special intelligence secretary to the Prime Minister with the same status as the military secretary.

Along with the above, Steinitz established a special Public Committee led by Prof. Amnon Rubinstein to examine the means to improve parliamentary oversight of the defense establishment. As committee chairman often pointed to the massive Egyptian military buildup with modern American weapons. In addition, Steinitz expressed a great Support for developing the Israeli Navy into a significant strategic arm and published several articles on this issue at the Maarachot Military Journal.

Steinitz supported Sharon's 2005 plan to withdraw from Gaza. Yet, at the same time, he led a parliamentary battle against delivering the Philadelphi Corridor to Egypt, claiming that the Egyptians deliberately ignore Palestinian arms smuggling through the Sinai Peninsula. He also argued that the Israel-Egypt Philadelphi agreement might erode the demilitarization of Sinai.

In addition, he called for a rapid "Defensive Shield" Operation in Gaza, prior to the Israeli withdrawal, in order to destroy the Hamas and Islamic Jihad rockets industry.

In 2018, the Israeli censorship allowed the publication of the secret documents that Steinitz sent to Prime Minister Sharon and the heads of the security services and intelligence organizations – in which he indicated in the summer of 2004 the possible existence of a secret nuclear project in Syria. It turned out that Steinitz and the sub-committee he chaired were the first in Israel and in the entire Western world, who have uncovered the military nuclear project in Syria, in absolute contrast to the intelligence agencies in Israel and the world. In the summer of 2004, Steinitz asked the Mossad and the Israeli Military Intelligence Directorate to present to the sub-committee of Intelligence and Secret Services a special plan to uncovering the likely secret nuclear project in Syria. While the military intelligence ignored the warnings, the Mossad did, in fact, change its action plan according to Steinitz's report, and after three years the Mossad found proof of the existence of a nuclear plant in the process of being built in the Syrian desert, which led to the destruction of the plant by the Israeli Air Force in 2007.

=== 17th Knesset (2006–2009) ===
Steinitz was reelected to the 17th Knesset in 2006 when the Likud lost its leading position to Kadima. As an opposition MK became again a member on the Foreign Affairs and Defense Committee and as the chairman of the "Subcommittee on Defense Readiness". Steinitz was Netanyahu's candidate for chairman of the "World Likud" in June 2006, but he lost to MK Danny Danon.

=== 18th Knesset (2009–2013) ===
After being reelected to the 18th Knesset, and following the Likud 2009 victory, Steinitz was appointed Minister of Finance and a member of the inner Security Cabinet by Prime Minister Netanyahu.

He was the first Finance Minister of Israel to submit to the Knesset a two-year budget, instead of the until-then customary one-year budget. This move generated some controversy, with some accusing it of decreasing government transparency and others praising it for its greater efficiency. Since then, Israel continued with the biennial budget and became the first country in the west to institute such a policy change. In 2009, most experts in the Bank of Israel and the Ministry of Finance opposed Steinitz's move, but today the biennial budget had a wide approval among the officials in the Bank of Israel and the Ministry of Finance.

=== 19th Knesset (2013–2015) ===
In the 19th Knesset Steinitz served as Minister for Intelligence, Strategic Affairs and International Relations in the new government.

=== 20th Knesset (2015–2020) ===
Steinitz was reelected to 20th Knesset and became Minister of National Infrastructure, Energy and Water Resources in the Thirty-fourth government of Israel.

In July 2022, Steinitz announced that he would not run for reelection to the Knesset, and announced his retirement from politics.

=== Legislation ===
Among the laws initiated by Steinitz during his tenure as MK:

- A law of three-year cooling off period for IDF generals and Heads of the Mossad, Shin Bet, and the Police, before they can become Knesset Members or government ministers.
- A law regulating the research of biological pathogens (bacteria, viruses, etc.) (with MK Aryeh Eldad).
- A law requiring noise meters in event halls.

=== Minister of Finance (2009–2013) ===
With the establishment of the 32nd by Prime Minister Netanyahu, Steinitz was appointed Minister of Finance. He took up this position in March 2009, during the beginning of the 2008 financial crisis, and after the Israeli economy already suffered from two quarters of negative economic growth which led to almost 10% unemployment.

After few weeks at office, Steinitz has launched an emergency plan entitled "Blima & Tnufa" (Break and Accelerate) aimed at returning the country to positive economic growth, through dramatically encouraging investments in the high-tech industry, in R&D, and in construction and transportation. As part of the program, a "triple package deal" between the government, the Histadrut Unions Association and the Israel Manufacturers Association was signed. The employees agreed to contribute 3.5 Billion NIS to help accelerating growth. In April 2009, Steinitz announced his unprecedented plan to enact the first biennial budget in Israel's history, as part of his counter-crisis policy. In July 2009, the government approved the biennial budget (since then all budgets in Israel were biennial).

At the beginning of his term, Steinitz raised the VAT from 15.5% to 16.5% effectively from July 2009, but it was reduced to 16% in January 2010. In 2010 the Israeli economy has already shown the fastest growing figures in the western world, with 5% growth and sharp reduction of unemployment.

In April 2009 Steinitz appointed Prof. Omer Moav as head of his advisory committee. When Moav resigned a year later, Steinitz appointed Prof. Avi Simchon to the post. In November 2009 Steinitz appointed Haim Shani as director general, but he resigned a year and a half later following the 2011 social protests.

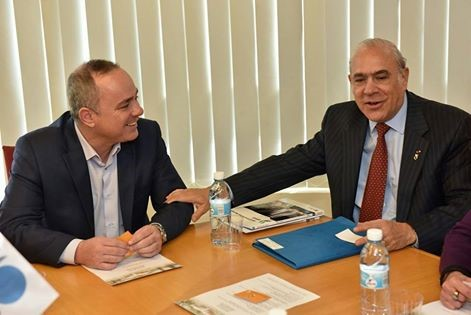
Secretary-General of the OECD José Ángel Gurría with Steinitz in Jerusalem, January 2016

In 2009 Steinitz started an intensive diplomatic campaign to promote Israel's acceptance to the OECD. In May 2010, after more than thirty years of failing attempts and despite strong opposition from the Arab World, Israel has finally become a full member of the OECD.

In 2010 Steinitz established the Sheshinski Committee to examine ways to increase the level of taxation on Natural Gas and Oil fields. Steinitz announced that he intended to raise the level of the over-whole "government-take" on gas and oil from 20% to around 50–60%. This led to a very aggressive campaign against him by the energy lobby, including pressures from the United States White House on behalf of the American Noble Energy. In 2011 Steinitz legislate the committee recommendations in the Knesset, raising the "government-take" on big gas fields to more than 60%. In addition, Steinitz has doubled the royalties paid by "Israel Chemicals" from using the Dead Sea natural resources and cancel its historic tax exemptions.

Two other important committees were the "Concentration Committee" (established at winter 2011 together with PM Netanyahu), which led to unprecedented steps to reduce economic concentration in Israel, like enforcing separation between significant Financial and Real holdings; And the "Investment Taxation Committee" (established in 2010 together with Minister Ben-Eliezer), which led to significant increase in Israel's investments incentives.

In 2011, a doctors' strike broke out and paralyzed all Hospitals and Clinics around the country, in what became the longest strike in Israel history. The strike ended after five months with a compromise between the Ministry of Finance and the Doctors union, which included the improvement of the doctors employment conditions, especially in peripheral hospitals, as well as Steinitz's demand that hospital doctors will be subjected to time clocks. Nevertheless, hundreds of interns and 200 senior doctors continued the strike and the protest against the deal, until eventually the protest petered out.

In the summer of 2011, and along with the doctors strike, a series of social protests against the cost of living in Israel took place. Demonstrations took place for a prolonged period of time, focusing on the high housing prices and the cost of daycare. The protesters were accompanied by doctors, teachers, students, and dairy farmers, who called for a change in the government social outlook. At the beginning Steinitz rejected the protesters' claims. But with the continuation of the protests, Steinitz began to show a more flexible attitude. One step was lowering taxes in order to reduce petrol price hike. Following the appointment of the "Trajtenberg Committee", Steinitz dealt with implementation of the committee's recommendations.

In September 2011, S&P raised Israel credit rating to A+. This decision took place in light of the fact that Israel managed to continue to reduce its debt-to-GDP ratio, and despite the global economic crisis.

During his tenure, Steinitz made efforts to develop business connections with China and India. In 2010–2011, Israeli exports to these countries increased by 35%. During his three official visits in China and India, Steinitz led negotiations for the signing a series of bilateral agreements designed to increase the volume of trade with these countries. Among other things, the agreement included specific steps to encourage young doctors from China and India to make their Postdoctoral Researches in Israel.

In July 2012, Steinitz led the signing of an economic agreement between Israel and the Palestinian Authority with Prime Minister Salam Fayyad. As part of the deal, it was decided to increase joint enforcement against smuggling of goods, and Israeli assistance to the Palestinian tax collection capabilities.

In 2012 the state annual deficit reached 39 Billion NIS, almost twice as much as was predicted, but the Debt-to-GDP ratio continued to decline. The average economic growth during Steinitz's tenure as Finance Minister (2010-2012) was 4.5%, the highest economic growth in the entire developed world.

=== Minister of Intelligence and Strategic Affairs (2013–2015) ===
After the 2013 elections Steinitz was appointed Minister for Intelligence, Strategic Affairs and International Relations, and became responsible to several topics:

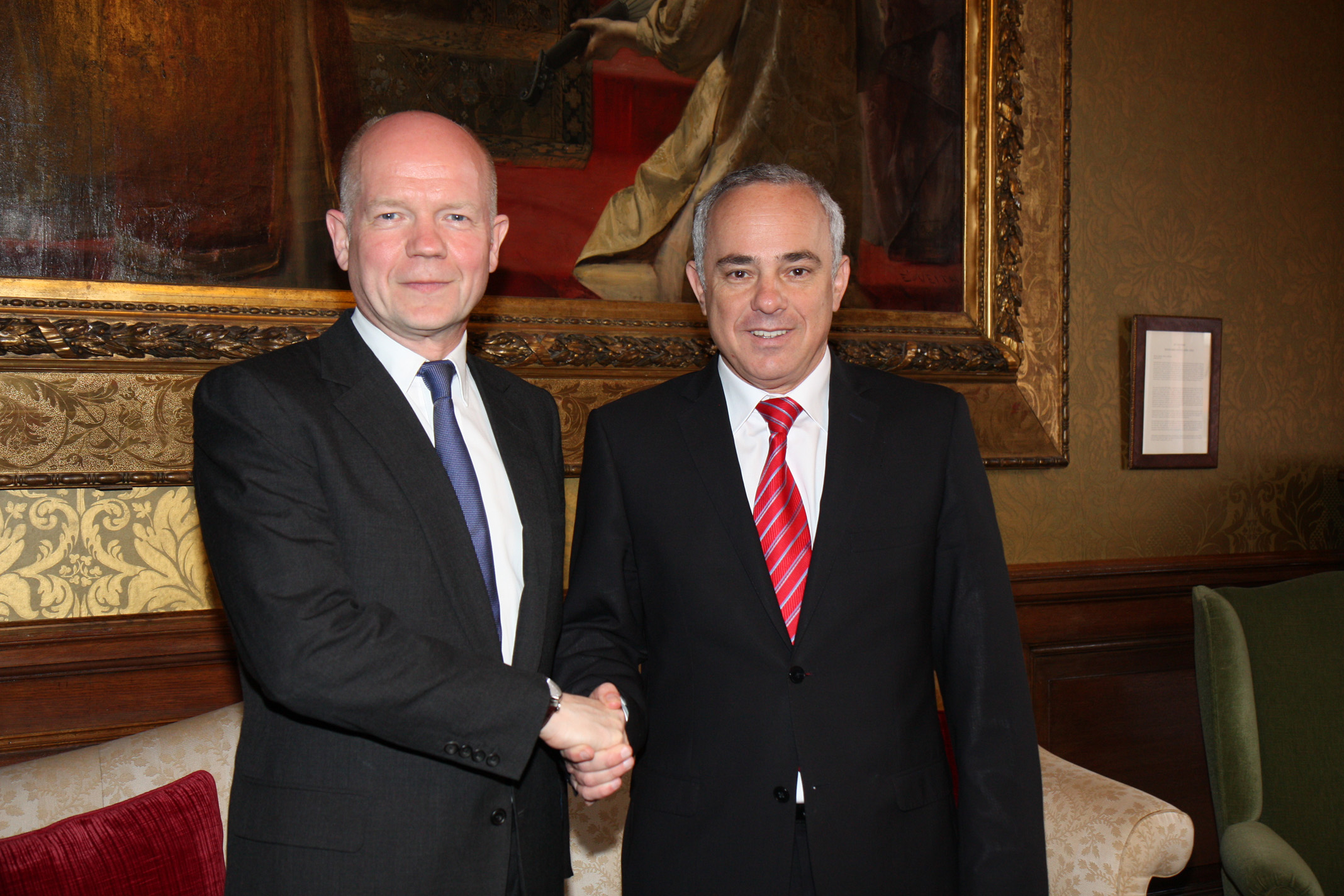
British Foreign Secretary William Hague with Steinitz in London, April 2014

- Iran Nuclear Program – Steinitz coordinated the Israeli diplomatic efforts vis-à-vis the P5+1 and the rest of the international community. He met regularly with senior officials dealing with Iranian issue including Vice President Joe Biden, the Chief US nuclear negotiator with Iran Bill Burns and Wendy Sherman, and the Foreign Ministers of Britain, France, and Germany. He also met the heads of intelligence in those countries, like the heads of the CIA and DNI in the US or the MI6 in Britain. During those meetings, Steinitz emphasized the size of the threat to Israel and the whole world as a result of Iran's military nuclear program. In the interim Agreement he convinced the French delegation to insist on limiting Iranian Uranium enrichment to 3.5% level. This limitation was included in the final agreement as well. According to Steinitz, the Israeli involvement and input did have a significant impact on both the interim and final agreements with Iran.
- Responsibility for economic issues vis-à-vis Palestinian Authority – with the resumption of negotiations with the PA, Steinitz was appointed to coordinate the economic issues.
- Responsibility for civilian intelligence agencies, Mossad and Shin Bet.
- Responsibility for the US-Israel strategic dialogue – as part of the activity, Steinitz led the discussions with US officials on the cooperation on policy, military, and intelligence issues, in order to strengthen the strategic alliance between the two countries.
- Responsibility for the Israel Atomic Energy Commission

=== Minister of Energy and Water Resources (2015–2021) ===
In May 2015, Steinitz was appointed Minister of National Infrastructure, Energy and Water Resources, as well as Minister in charge of the Israel Atomic Energy Commission. Two months later, after several years of delays and against very strong opposition from the Israeli left circles, Steinitz formulated the "Gas Framework", in order to enable the development of Israel's biggest gas discovery "Leviathan" (discovered in 2010), and to pave the way to future gas and oil explorations. The "Gas Framework" was approved by the Israeli government in August 2015, and by the Knesset Plenum in September 2015. Yet in March 2016 Israel's Supreme court nullified the framework stability section, and forced Minister Steinitz to amend it and bring it back to government approval. The revised framework was approved in May 2016, and the development of "Leviathan" ultimately started.

US Energy Secretary Ernest Moniz and Steinitz in Jerusalem, April 2016

In April 2016 the US Energy Secretary Dr. Ernest Moniz visited Israel for the first time. Together with Steinitz, they signed a bilateral agreement which upgrades the energy cooperation between the United States and Israel.

In July 2016 Steinitz announced that the Ministry of Energy will publish new oil and gas licenses, after four years in which the country economic waters were practically closed for new explorations and searches.

During 2017, the natural gas monopoly consisting of the Israeli company Delek and the American company Noble Energy had begun to fall apart, when the selling of the Karish-Tanin to the Greek company Energean occurred. This ultimately led to more competition for customers and the cheaper prices.

In April 2017 Steinitz hosted the ministers of energy from Italy, Greece, and Cyprus, as well as the European Commissioner for Energy, to kick off his plan to construct a sub-sea pipeline—the longest and deepest in the world—allowing Israel and Cyprus to export gas to Greece and Italy, and through them to west Europe.

In his capacity, Steinitz initiated a plan to eliminating the use of coal and polluting fuels in the State of Israel, and replacing them with natural gas and renewable energies. Within three years, the percentage of coal and mazut dropped from 65% of electricity production in 2015 to 25% in 2018. According to the plan, in 2027 Israel will no longer continue to use coal. Steinitz has also promoted a plan to shift all transportation in Israel from traditional fuels to electricity and natural gas, by the year 2030.

In June 2018, Steinitz signed an implementation agreement with his American counterpart, Rick Perry, establishing a joint energy research and development center. This cooperation agreement aims to accelerate development and rapid deployment of critical and innovative technologies for natural gas, cybersecurity, energy-water nexus, water storage, and other areas of energy that are needed to diversify energy supply and promote higher efficiency.

== Post-political career ==
In April 2023, Stenitiz was appointed Chairman of Rafael Advanced Defense Systems, a government-owned arms corporation.

== Views ==
He has campaigned for heightened awareness of the Iranian nuclear threat, lobbying at home and abroad to ensure that Iran does not become a nuclear power.

In 2008, when Israel refused permission for Palestinian Fulbright students to leave Gaza and study in the United States, Steinitz supported this action. He told the New York Times: "We are fighting the regime in Gaza that does its utmost to kill our citizens and destroy our schools and our colleges. So I don’t think we should allow students from Gaza to go anywhere. Gaza is under siege, and rightly so, and it is up to the Gazans to change the regime or its behavior." He disagreed with former Governor of the Bank of Israel, Stanley Fischer, on various issues, and has a complicated relationship with Netanyahu, who bypassed him several times in his first year in office.

In June 2013, when Austria planned to withdraw its UN troops (stationary since 1974) from the Golan Heights, Yuval Steinitz issued a statement expressing regret at the Austrian move, adding that the lesson for Israel was clear: "Even as part of peace agreements, Israel cannot place its security in the hands of international forces instead of relying on the presence of IDF soldiers."

In December 2015, after the assassination of Samir Kuntar, he claimed in the newspaper Haaretz that the Finnish Intelligence services was perhaps behind this affair. After contact from the Helsingin Sanomat newspaper, Haaretz claimed that it was a joke, putting to serious threat Israel's foreign policy.

On 19 November 2017, Energy Minister Yuval Steinitz said that Israel has had covert contacts with Saudi Arabia amid common concerns over Iran. This is the first public admission of cooperation between the two countries by a senior Israeli official.

On 7 May 2018, Steinitz, in an interview to Israeli news site Ynet, said that Syrian President Bashar al-Assad, should be 'eliminated' by Israel for his relationship with Iran, he later clarified it was his personal opinion and not that of the government.

== Family ==
Steinitz is married to Gila Canfy-Steinitz, a judge and the vice president of the Jerusalem District Court, with whom he has three children. They live in Mevaseret Zion.

== Writings by Steinitz ==
=== Books in English ===
- Invitation to Philosophy: Imagined Dialogues with Great Philosophers, Hackett Publishing house, Cambridge, USA (1994).
- Steinitz, Yuval (1996). In defense of metaphysics. Translated by Efron, Noah J. New York: P. Lang. ISBN 0820424471.
- Steinitz, Yuval (2005). Defensible borders for a lasting peace. Jerusalem: Jerusalem Center for Public Affairs. ISBN 9652180491.

=== Articles in English ===
- "Necessary beings", by Yuval Steinitz, American Philosophical Quarterly (April 1994).
- "Brains in a Vat: Different Perspectives", by Yuval Steinitz, The Philosophical Quarterly (April 1994).
- "Contradictions are Ontological Arguments", by Yuval Steinitz, Religious Studies (December 1994).
- "A worst-case scenario: A Palestinian guerilla offensive on the outskirts of Tel-Aviv", by Yuval Steinitz, Israel and a Palestinian State Zero Sum Game? (2001).
- "Israel Has Nothing to Hide", by Yuval Steinitz, The New York Times (4 May 2002).
- "Israel Gaza Dilemma in the Aftermath of the War with Hizbullah", by Yuval Steinitz, Jerusalem Center of Public affairs (4 May 2002).
- "The requisites of Israel Palestinian peace", by Yuval Steinitz, The Jerusalem Post (11 July 2013).
- "How Palestinian Hate Prevents Peace", by Yuval Steinitz, The New York Times (15 October 2013).
- "The simple, logical answer to the Iran nuclear conundrum", by Yuval Steinitz, Financial Times (13 November 2013).
- "Get Off the Budget Treadmill", by Niall Ferguson and Yuval Steinitz, The New York Times (5 December 2013).
- "Iran deal could encourage, rather than limit, nuclear activity", by Yuval Steinitz, The Washington Post (28 February 2014).
- "Don’t Make a Bad Deal With Iran", by Yuval Steinitz, The New York Times (19 October 2014).
- "Fiscal Years Should Come in Pairs", by Yuval Steinitz, The Wall Street Journal (30 March 2016).
