= Fifteenth government of Israel =

1969–74 government led by Golda Meir

Second Meir Cabinet
- 15th Cabinet of Israel

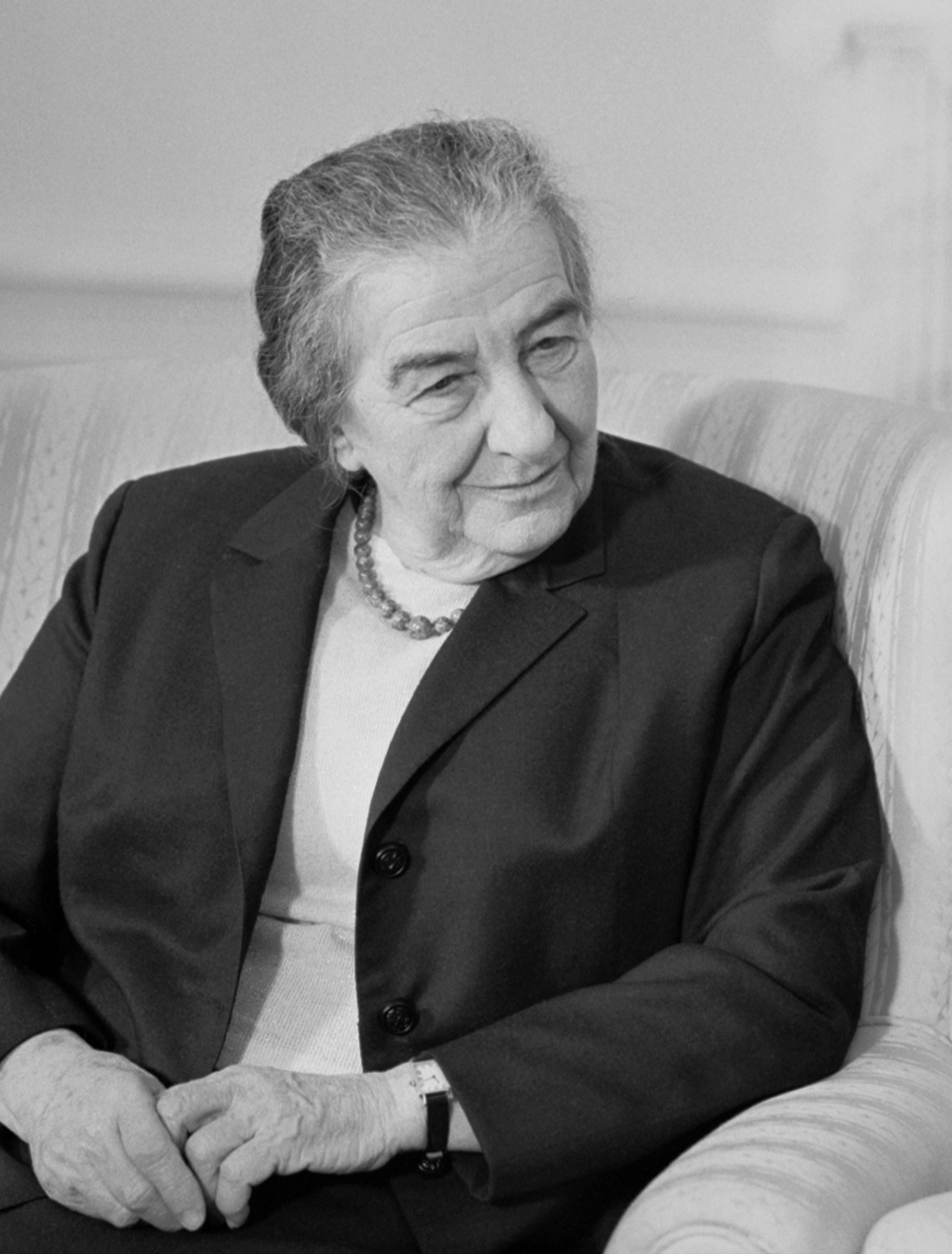
- Date formed: 15 December 1969
- Date dissolved: 10 March 1974

People and organisations
- Head of state: Zalman Shazar (until 1973); Ephraim Katzir (from 1973)
- Head of government: Golda Meir
- Member parties: Alignment; Gahal (until August 1970); National Religious Party; Progress and Development; Independent Liberals; Cooperation and Brotherhood
- Status in legislature: Coalition
- Opposition leader: Yitzhak-Meir Levin (until 1970); Menachem Begin (from 1970)

History
- Election: 1969 Israeli legislative election
- Legislature term: 7th Knesset
- Predecessor: 14th Cabinet of Israel
- Successor: 16th Cabinet of Israel

The fifteenth government of Israel was formed by Golda Meir on 15 December 1969 following the October elections. The government was a continuation of the national unity government formed during the previous Knesset, and consisted of the Alignment, Gahal, the National Religious Party, the Independent Liberals and the Israeli Arab parties Progress and Development and Cooperation and Brotherhood. Gahal left the coalition in early August 1970 after the government agreed to accept the Rogers Plan.

The government remained in place until 10 March 1974, when the sixteenth government took power following the December 1973 elections. It is notable for being the first government to last a full four-year Knesset term, and the first to include any non-Jewish members; On 24 May 1971 Meir appointed Abd el-Aziz el-Zoubi as Deputy Minister of Health, making him the first Israeli Arab to join the cabinet. In November that year, Druze MK Jabr Muadi also joined the cabinet as Deputy Minister of Communications.

Israeli government formation, December 1969
- 15 December 1969
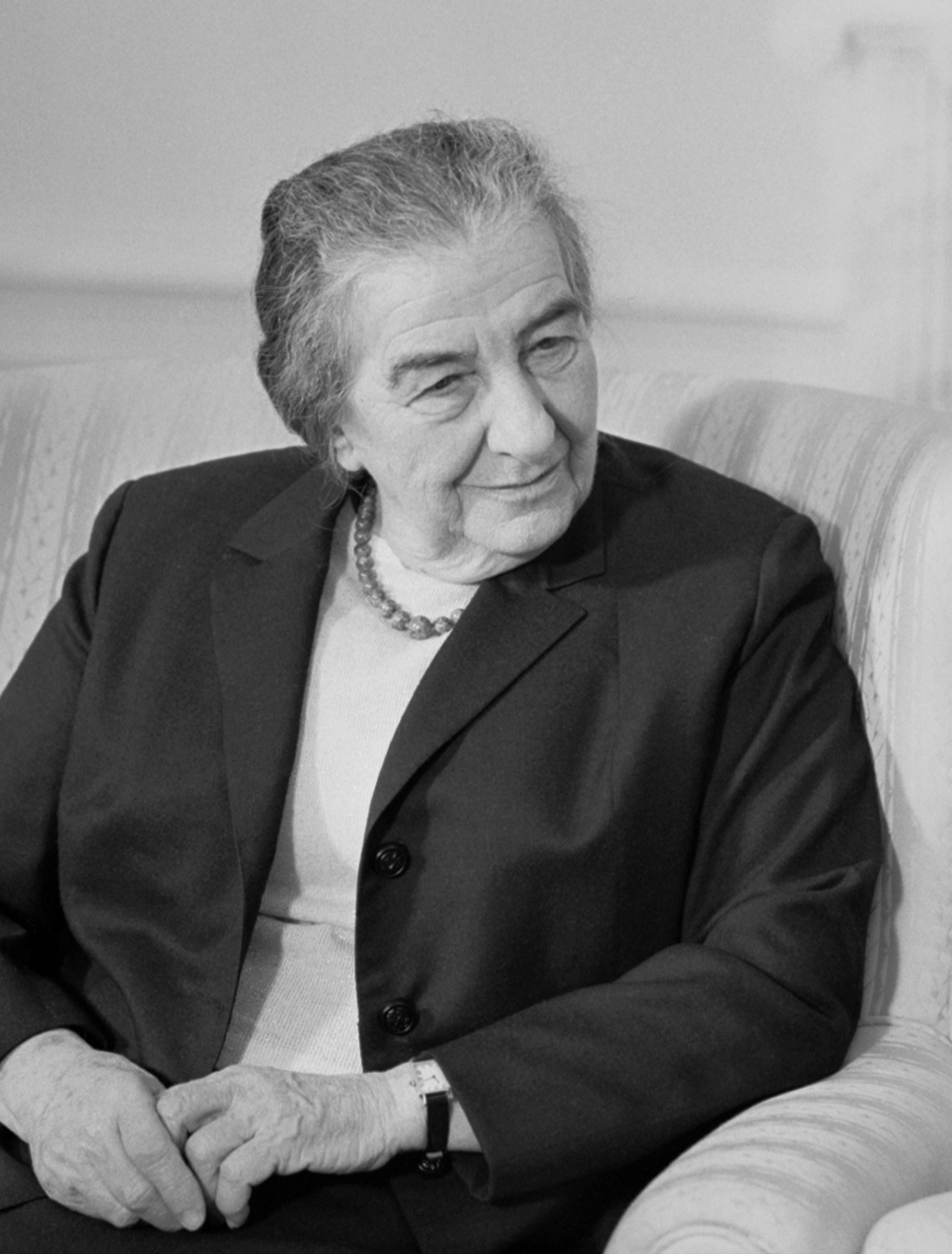

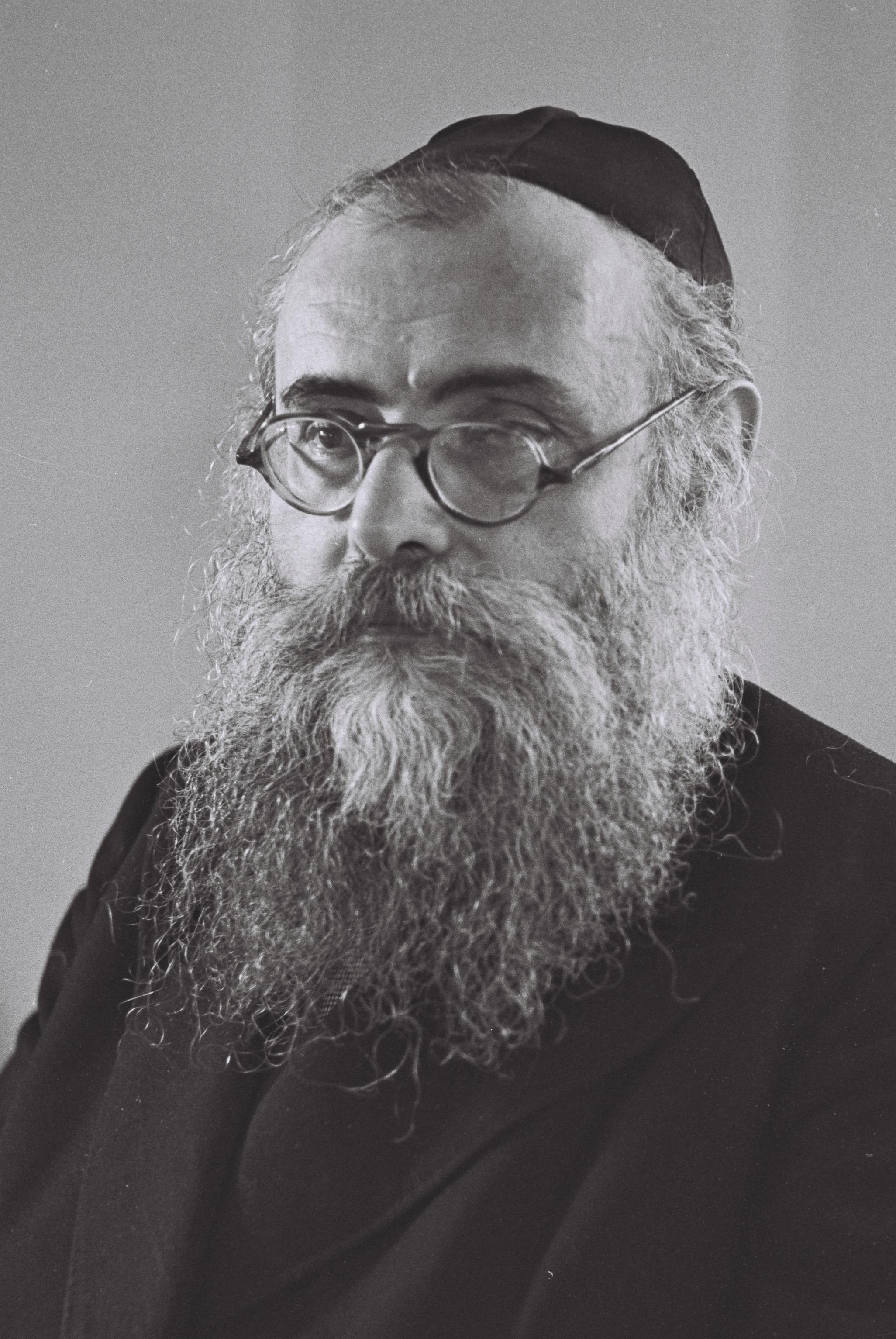
Nominee	Golda Meir	Yitzhak-Meir Levin
Party	Alignment	Agudat Yisrael
Electoral vote	102	18
Percentage	85.0%	15.0%
Prime Minister before election
Golda Meir
Alignment
Elected Prime Minister
Golda Meir
Alignment

== Cabinet members ==
Position	Person	Party
Prime Minister	Golda Meir	Alignment
Deputy Prime Minister	Yigal Allon	Alignment
Minister of Agriculture	Haim Gvati	Alignment
Minister of Communications	Elimelekh Rimalt (until 6 August 1970)	Gahal
Minister of Communications	Shimon Peres (from 1 September 1970)	Alignment
Minister of Defense	Moshe Dayan	Alignment
Minister of Development	Haim Landau (until 6 August 1970)	Gahal
Minister of Development	Haim Gvati (from 6 August 1970)	Alignment
Minister of Education and Culture	Yigal Allon	Alignment
Minister of Finance	Pinhas Sapir	Alignment
Minister of Foreign Affairs	Abba Eban	Alignment
Minister of Health	Haim Gvati (until 27 July 1970)	Alignment
Minister of Health	Victor Shem-Tov (from 27 July 1970)	Not an MK ^{1}
Minister of Housing	Ze'ev Sherf	Alignment
Minister of Immigrant; Absorption	Shimon Peres (until 27 July 1970)	Alignment
Minister of Immigrant; Absorption	Natan Peled (from 27 July 1970)	Not an MK ^{1}
Minister of Internal Affairs	Haim-Moshe Shapira (until 16 July 1970) ^{2}	National Religious Party
Minister of Internal Affairs	Yosef Burg (from 16 July 1970)	Not an MK ^{3}
Minister of Justice	Yaakov Shimshon Shapira ^{4}	Alignment
Minister of Labour	Yosef Almogi	Alignment
Minister of Police	Shlomo Hillel	Alignment
Minister of Religions	Zerach Warhaftig	Not an MK ^{3}
Minister of Tourism	Moshe Kol	Not an MK ^{5}
Minister of Trade and Industry	Yosef Sapir (until 6 August 1970)	Gahal
Minister of Trade and Industry	Pinhas Sapir (1 September 1970 – 5 March 1972)	Alignment
Minister of Trade and Industry	Haim Bar-Lev (from 5 March 1972)	Not an MK ^{6}
Minister of Transportation	Ezer Weizman (until 6 August 1970)	Not an MK ^{7}
Minister of Transportation	Shimon Peres (from 1 September 1970)	Alignment
Minister of Welfare	Yosef Burg (until 1 September 1970)	Not an MK ^{3}
Minister of Welfare	Michael Hasani (from 1 September 1970)	National Religious Party
Minister without Portfolio	Shimon Peres (until 22 December 1969)	Alignment
Minister without Portfolio	Yisrael Barzilai (until 12 June 1970) ^{2}	Not an MK ^{1}
Minister without Portfolio	Victor Shem-Tov	Not an MK ^{1}
Minister without Portfolio	Menachem Begin (until 6 August 1970)	Gahal
Minister without Portfolio	Aryeh Dolchin (until 6 August 1970)	Not an MK ^{7}
Minister without Portfolio	Yisrael Galili	Alignment
Deputy Minister of Agriculture	Ben-Zion Halfon	Alignment
Deputy Minister of Communications	Jabr Muadi (from 27 October 1971)	Progress and Development
Deputy Minister of Education and Culture	Michael Hasani (until 1 September 1970)	National Religious Party
Deputy Minister of Education and Culture	Aharon Yadlin (until 26 July 1972)	Alignment
Deputy Minister of Education and Culture	Avner Shaki (1 September 1970 – 17 July 1972)	National Religious Party
Deputy Minister of Education and Culture	Zevulun Hammer (from 16 January 1973)	National Religious Party
Deputy Minister of Finance	Zvi Dinstein	Alignment
Deputy Minister of Health	Abd el-Aziz el-Zoubi (24 May 1971 – 14 February 1974) ^{2}	Alignment
Deputy Minister of Immigrant Absorption	Shlomo Rosen (from 20 November 1972)	Alignment
Deputy Minister of Internal Affairs	Yosef Goldschmidt ^{8}	National Religious Party
Deputy Minister of Tourism	Yehuda Sha'ari	Independent Liberals
Deputy Minister of Transportation	Gad Yaacobi (from 2 November 1972)	Alignment

^{1} Although Barzilai, Shem-Tov, Peled were not MKs at the time all had previously been MKs for Mapam, one of the constituents of the Alignment.

^{2} Died in office.

^{3} All National Religious Party MKs except Haim-Moshe Shapira and Michael Hasani resigned from the Knesset upon being appointed to the cabinet.

^{4} Yaakov-Shimshon Shapira was out of office between 13 June and 12 September 1972.

^{5} All Independent Liberal MKs resigned from the Knesset upon being appointed to the cabinet.

^{6} Bar-Lev was later an MK for the Alignment.

^{7} Dolchin and Weizman were Gahal members.

^{8} Goldschmidt was out of office between 16 and 19 July 1970.
