= Thirteenth government of Israel =

1966–69 government led by Levi Eshkol

Third Eshkol Cabinet
- 13th Cabinet of Israel

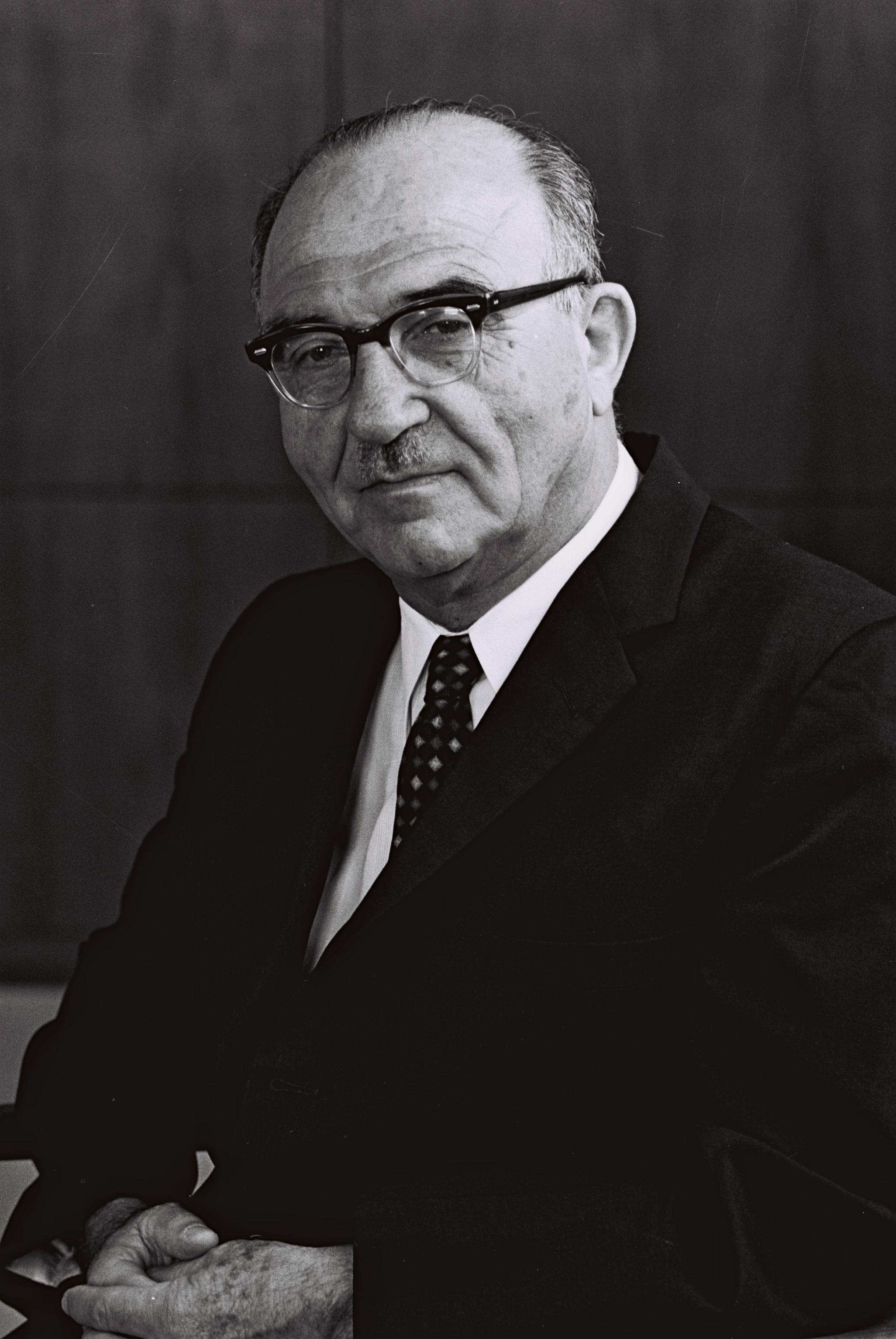
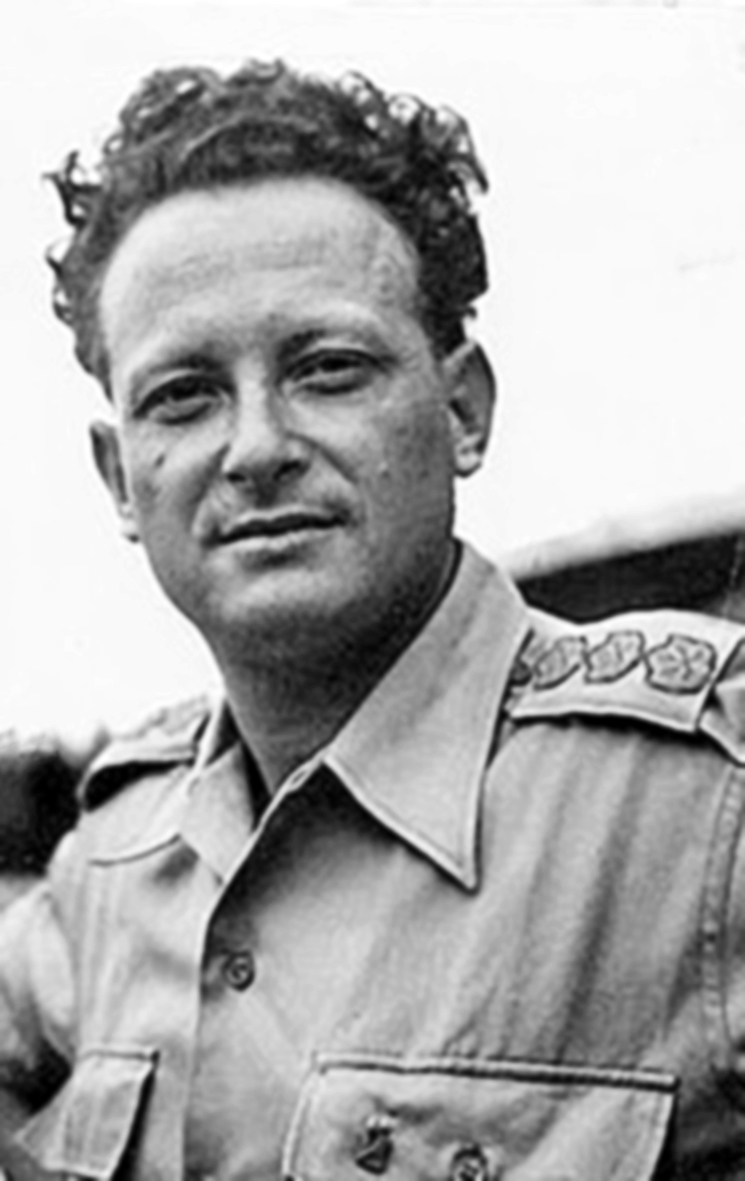
- Date formed: 12 January 1966
- Date dissolved: 17 March 1969

People and organisations
- Head of state: Zalman Shazar
- Head of government: Levi Eshkol (until 26 February 1969); Yigal Allon (until 17 March 1969)
- Member parties: Alignment; Labor Party; Rafi (from 5 June 1967); National Religious Party; Gahal (from 5 June 1967); Independent Liberals; Poalei Agudat Yisrael; Mapam; Progress and Development; Cooperation and Brotherhood
- Status in legislature: Coalition
- Opposition leader: Menachem Begin (until 1967); Yitzhak-Meir Levin (from 1967)

History
- Election: 1965 Israeli legislative election
- Legislature term: 6th Knesset
- Predecessor: 12th Cabinet of Israel
- Successor: 14th Cabinet of Israel

The thirteenth government of Israel was formed by Levi Eshkol on 12 January 1966, following the November 1965 elections. His coalition included the Alignment (an alliance of Mapai and Ahdut HaAvoda), the National Religious Party, Mapam, the Independent Liberals, Poalei Agudat Yisrael, Progress and Development and Cooperation and Brotherhood, and had eighteen ministers.

On 5 June 1967, the first day of the Six-Day War, Gahal and Rafi joined the government, with the number of ministers rising to 21. Eshkol died on 26 February 1969, and the government was temporarily led by Yigal Allon until Golda Meir formed the fourteenth government on 17 March 1969.

New posts in the government included the Minister of Immigrant Absorption and the Minister of Information.

Israeli government formation, 1966
- 12 January 1966
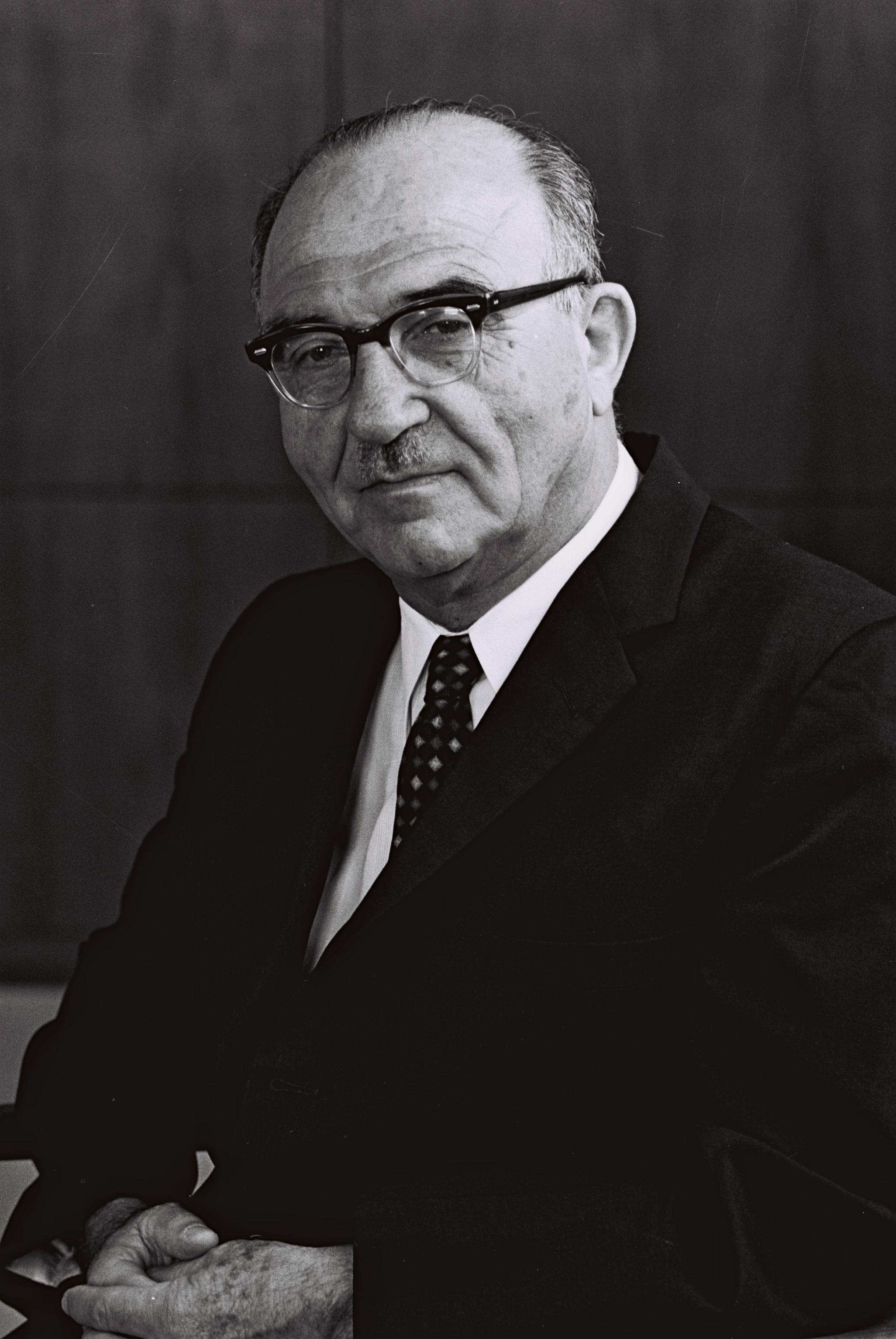

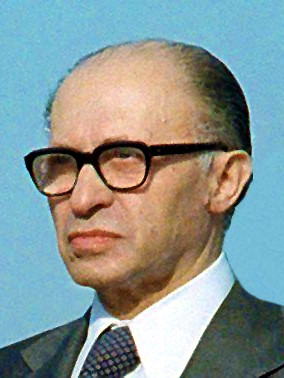
Nominee	Levi Eshkol	Menachem Begin
Party	Alignment	Gahal
Electoral vote	77	43
Percentage	64.2%	35.8%
Prime Minister before election
Levi Eshkol
Mapai
Elected Prime Minister
Levi Eshkol
Alignment

== Cabinet members ==
Thirteenth Government of Israel
Portfolio	Minister	Party
Prime Minister	Levi Eshkol (12 January 1966 – 26 February 1969)	Alignment, Labor Party
Prime Minister	Yigal Allon (26 February – 17 March 1969) (interim)	Alignment
Deputy Prime Minister	Yigal Allon (1 July 1968 – 17 March 1969)	Labor Party, Alignment
Minister of Agriculture	Haim Gvati	Alignment, Labor Party
Minister of Defense	Levi Eshkol (12 January 1966 – 5 June 1967)	Alignment
Minister of Defense	Moshe Dayan (5 June 1967 – 17 March 1969)	Rafi, Labor Party, Alignment
Minister of Development	Moshe Kol	Not an MK ^{1}
Minister of Education and Culture	Zalman Aran	Alignment, Labor Party
Minister of Finance	Pinchas Sapir (12 January 1966 – 5 August 1968)	Alignment, Labor Party
Minister of Finance	Ze'ev Sherf (5 August 1968 – 17 March 1969)	Labor Party, Alignment
Minister of Foreign Affairs	Abba Eban	Alignment, Labor Party
Minister of Health	Yisrael Barzilai	Not an MK ^{2}
Minister of Housing	Mordechai Bentov	Not an MK ^{2}
Minister of Immigrant Absorption	Yigal Allon (1 July 1968 – 17 March 1969)	Labor Party, Alignment
Minister of Information	Yisrael Galili (24 October 1966 – 17 March 1969)	Alignment, Labor Party
Minister of Internal Affairs	Haim-Moshe Shapira	National Religious Party
Minister of Justice	Ya'akov Shimshon Shapira	Not an MK ^{3}
Minister of Labour	Yigal Allon (12 January 1966 – 8 July 1968)	Alignment, Labor Party
Minister of Labour	Yosef Almogi (8 July 1968 – 17 March 1969)	Labor Party, Alignment
Minister of Police	Bechor-Shalom Sheetrit (12 January 1966 – 2 January 1967)	Alignment
Minister of Police	Eliyahu Sasson (2 January 1967 – 17 March 1969)	Alignment, Labor Party
Minister of Postal Services	Eliyahu Sasson (12 January 1966 – 2 January 1967)	Alignment
Minister of Postal Services	Yisrael Yeshayahu (2 January 1967 – 17 March 1969)	Alignment, Labor Party
Minister of Religions	Zerach Warhaftig	National Religious Party
Minister of Tourism	Moshe Kol	Not an MK ^{1}
Minister of Trade and Industry	Haim Yosef Zadok (12 January – 22 November 1966)	Alignment
Minister of Trade and Industry	Ze'ev Sherf (22 November 1966 – 17 March 1969)	Alignment
Minister of Transportation	Moshe Carmel	Alignment, Labor Party
Minister of Welfare	Yosef Burg	National Religious Party
Minister without Portfolio	Yisrael Galili (12 January – 24 October 1966)	Alignment
Minister without Portfolio	Menachem Begin (5 June 1967– 17 March 1969)	Gahal
Minister without Portfolio	Yosef Sapir (5 June 1967– 17 March 1969)	Gahal
Minister without Portfolio	Pinchas Sapir (5 August 1968 – 17 March 1969)	Labor Party, Alignment
Deputy Minister of Agriculture	Aharon Uzan (17 January 1966 – 17 March 1969)	Alignment, Labor Party
Deputy Minister of Defense	Zvi Dinstein (17 January 1966 – 5 June 1967)	Alignment
Deputy Minister of Development	Yehuda Sha'ari (17 January 1966 – 17 March 1969)	Independent Liberals
Deputy Minister of Education and Culture	Kalman Kahana (17 January 1966 – 17 March 1969)	Poalei Agudat Yisrael
Deputy Minister of Education and Culture	Aharon Yadlin (17 January 1966 – 17 March 1969)	Alignment, Labor Party
Deputy Minister of Finance	Zvi Dinstein (24 July 1967 – 17 March 1969)	Labor Party, Alignment
Deputy Minister of Immigrant Absorption	Aryeh Eliav (12 August 1968 – 17 March 1969)	Labor Party, Alignment
Deputy Minister of Internal Affairs	Shlomo-Yisrael Ben-Meir (17 January 1966 – 17 March 1969)	National Religious Party
Deputy Minister of Religions	Binyamin Shahor (1 February 1966 – 17 March 1969)	National Religious Party
Deputy Minister of Trade and Industry	Aryeh Eliav (17 October – 22 November 1966, 28 November 1966 – 26 June 1967)	Alignment

¹ Kol was elected to the Knesset on the Independent Liberal list, but resigned his seat after being appointed to the cabinet.

^{2} Although Barzilai or Bentov were not MKs at the time, both were members of Mapam.

^{3} Although Shapira was not an MK at the time, he had previously been an MK for Mapai, and w elected to the next Knesset as a member of the Alignment.
