= Fourteenth government of Israel =

1969 government led by Golda Meir

First Meir Cabinet
- 14th Cabinet of Israel

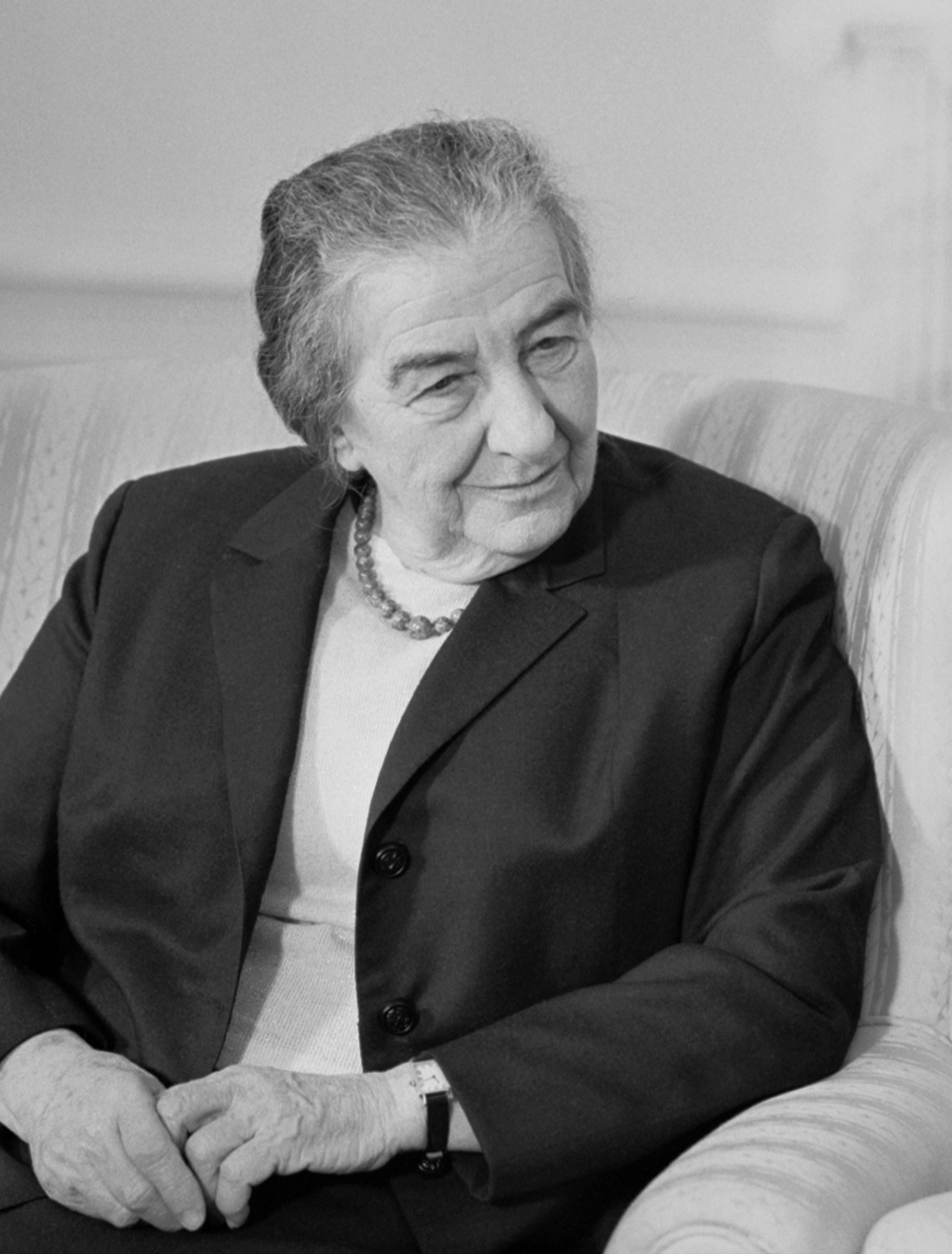
- Date formed: 17 March 1969
- Date dissolved: 15 December 1969

People and organisations
- Head of state: Zalman Shazar
- Head of government: Golda Meir
- Member parties: Alignment; National Religious Party; Gahal; Independent Liberals; Poalei Agudat Yisrael; Progress and Development; Cooperation and Brotherhood
- Status in legislature: Coalition
- Opposition leader: Yitzhak-Meir Levin

History
- Legislature term: 6th Knesset
- Predecessor: 13th Cabinet of Israel
- Successor: 15th Cabinet of Israel

The fourteenth government of Israel was formed by Golda Meir on 17 March 1969, following the death of Prime Minister Levi Eshkol on 26 February. She kept the same national unity government coalition, including the newly formed Alignment alliance of the Labor Party and Mapam, as well as Gahal, the National Religious Party, the Independent Liberals, Poalei Agudat Yisrael, Progress and Development, Cooperation and Brotherhood. The only change to the cabinet was the scrapping of the Minister of Information post, with the previous post-holder Yisrael Galili becoming a Minister without Portfolio instead.

The government served until the formation of the fifteenth government by Meir on 15 December 1969, following the October elections.

Israeli government formation, March 1969
- 17 March 1969
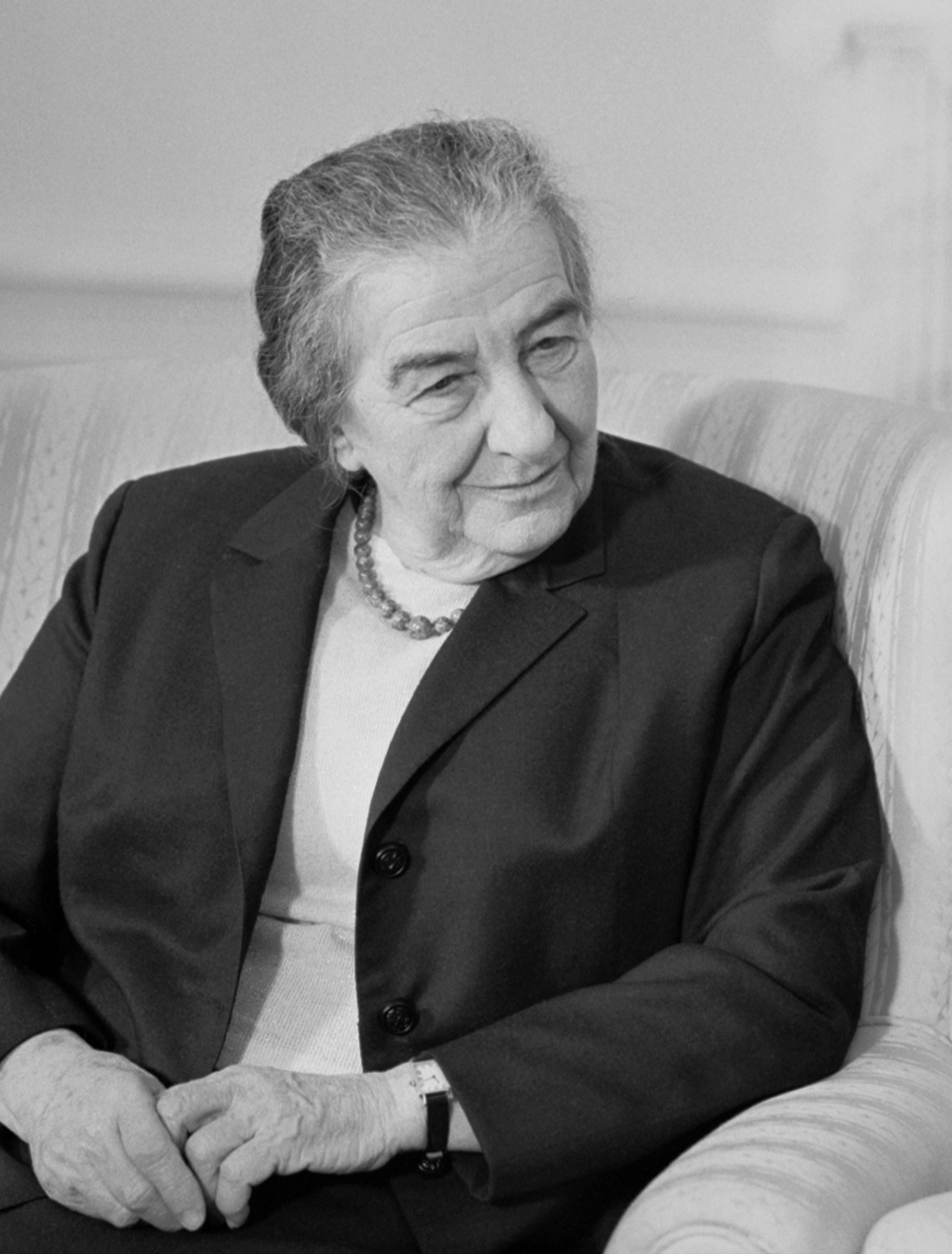

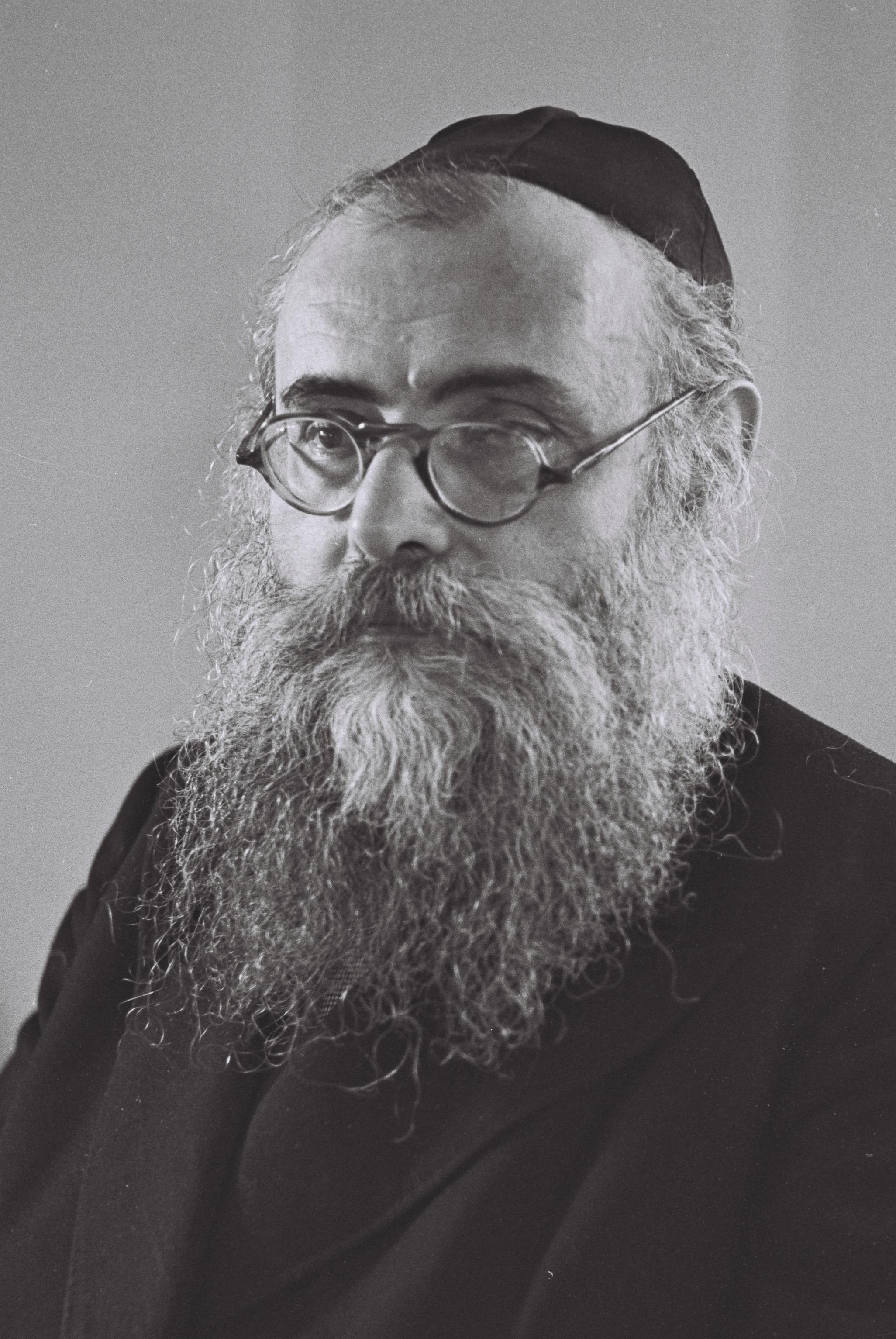
Nominee	Golda Meir	Yitzhak-Meir Levin
Party	Alignment	Agudat Yisrael
Electoral vote	93	27
Percentage	77.5%	22.5%
Prime Minister before election
Levi Eshkol
Alignment
Elected Prime Minister
Golda Meir
Alignment

== Cabinet members ==
Position	Person	Party
Prime Minister	Golda Meir	Alignment
Deputy Prime Minister	Yigal Allon	Alignment
Minister of Agriculture	Haim Gvati	Not an MK (Note: Gvati and Carmel had been elected to the Knesset on the Alignment list, but resigned their seats in 1966.)
Minister of Defense	Moshe Dayan	Alignment
Minister of Development	Moshe Kol	Not an MK (Note: Kol had been elected to the Knesset on the Independent Liberals list, but had resigned after being appointed to the cabinet.)
Minister of Education and Culture	Zalman Aran	Alignment
Minister of Finance	Ze'ev Sherf	Alignment
Minister of Foreign Affairs	Abba Eban	Alignment
Minister of Health	Yisrael Barzilai	Not an MK (Note: Although Barzilai and Bentov were not Knesset members, both were members of Mapam.)
Minister of Housing	Mordechai Bentov	Not an MK
Minister of Immigrant Absorption	Yigal Allon	Alignment
Minister of Internal Affairs	Haim-Moshe Shapira	National Religious Party
Minister of Justice	Ya'akov Shimshon Shapira	Not an MK (Note: Although Shapira was not an MK at the time, he had previously been an MK for Mapai, and was elected to the next Knesset as a member of the Alignment.)
Minister of Labour	Yosef Almogi	Alignment
Minister of Police	Eliyahu Sasson	Alignment
Minister of Postal Services	Yisrael Yeshayahu	Alignment
Minister of Religions	Zerach Warhaftig	National Religious Party
Minister of Tourism	Moshe Kol	Not an MK
Minister of Trade and Industry	Ze'ev Sherf	Alignment
Minister of Transportation	Moshe Carmel	Not an MK
Minister of Welfare	Yosef Burg	National Religious Party
Minister without Portfolio	Yisrael Galili	Alignment
Minister without Portfolio	Menachem Begin	Gahal
Minister without Portfolio	Yosef Sapir	Gahal
Minister without Portfolio	Pinchas Sapir	Alignment
Deputy Minister of Agriculture	Aharon Uzan (until 17 November 1969)	Alignment
Deputy Minister of Development	Yehuda Sha'ari	Independent Liberals
Deputy Minister of Education and Culture	Kalman Kahana	Poalei Agudat Yisrael
Deputy Minister of Education and Culture	Aharon Yadlin (until 17 November 1969)	Alignment
Deputy Minister of Finance	Zvi Dinstein	Alignment
Deputy Minister of Immigrant Absorption	Aryeh Eliav	Alignment
Deputy Minister of Internal Affairs	Shlomo-Yisrael Ben-Meir	National Religious Party
Deputy Minister of Religions	Binyamin Shahor	National Religious Party
