= Dinstein =

Dinstein is a surname. Notable people with the surname include:

- Yoram Dinstein (1936–2024), Israeli legal scholar
- Zvi Dinstein (1926–2012), Israeli civil servant and politician
