= Ministry of National Security (Israel) =

Government ministry of Israel

- המשרד לביטחון לאומי
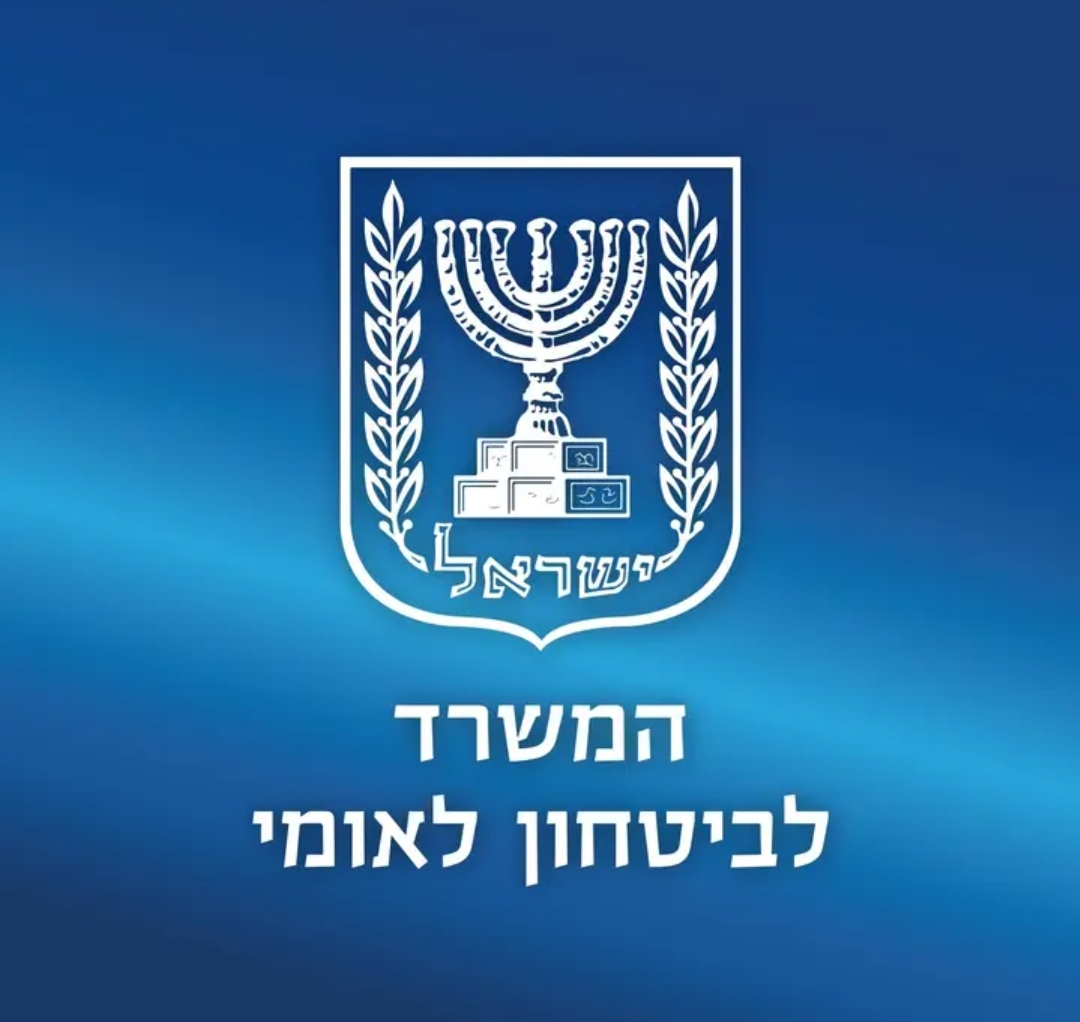
- Ministry emblem

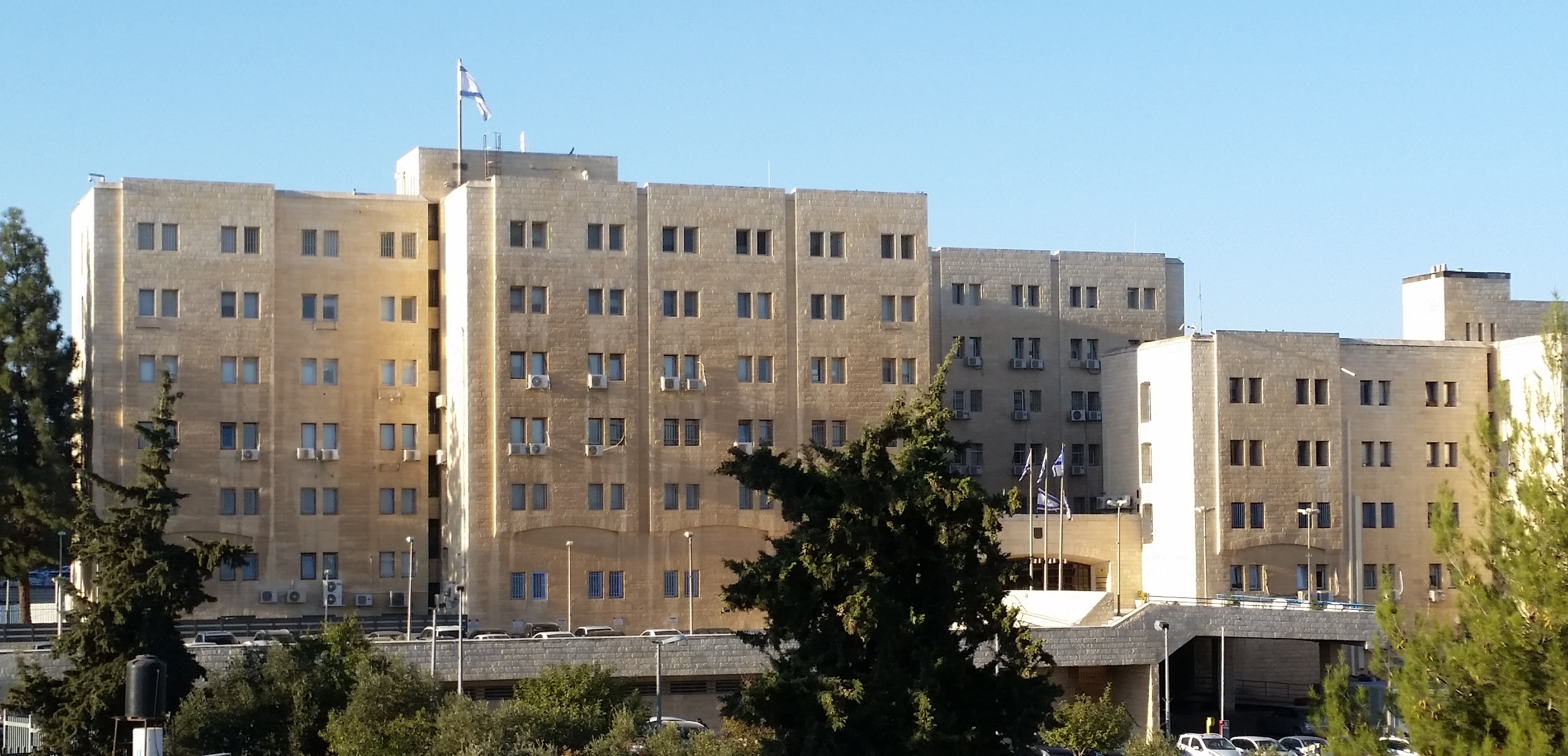
- Ministry headquarters at Kiryat Menachem Begin

Agency overview
- Formed: 1948
- Jurisdiction: Government of Israel
- Headquarters: Kiryat Menachem Begin, Jerusalem
- Minister responsible: Itamar Ben-Gvir
- Website: www.mops.gov.il

The Ministry of National Security (Hebrew: המשרד לביטחון לאומי, Arabic: وزارة الأمن القومي), formerly the Ministry of Internal Security and Ministry of Police, is a government agency of Israel.

The Ministry of National Security is the statewide law enforcement agency and oversees the Israel Police, the Israel Prison Service and the Israel National Fire and Rescue Services, Israel Border Police, National Headquarters for the Protection of Children on the Internet, National Authority for Community Safety and the Authority for Witness Protection.

The position has been held by Itamar Ben-Gvir since March 2025.

== History ==
The Minister of National Security (Hebrew: שר לביטחון לאומי, Sar LeVitahon Leumi) is the political head of the ministry.

Until 1995 the position was known as Minister of Police (Hebrew: שר המשטרה, Sar HaMishtara). The first Minister of Police, Bechor-Shalom Sheetrit, a former policeman, held this position from May 1948 until a month before his death in January 1967. He served in fourteen governments, making him the country's longest continually serving minister.

The post was abolished after Menachem Begin became Prime Minister in 1977, but was reinstated in 1984 when Shimon Peres was elected.

In December 2022, the position was renamed again, changing from Minister of Public Security (Hebrew: שר לביטחון פנים, Sar LeVitahon Pnim) to Minister of National Security. This move has been criticized as an unnecessary expense for taxpayers.

In February 2024, Ben-Gvir's appointment as minister was challenged but Israel's High Court of Justice turned down the petition to nullify this appointment.

#	Minister	Party	Government	Term start	Term end	Notes
Minister of Police
1	Bechor-Shalom Sheetrit	Sephardim & Oriental Communities; Mapai; Alignment	P, 1, 2, 3, 4, 5, 6, 7, 8, 9, 10, 11, 12, 13	14 May 1948	2 January 1967	
2	Eliyahu Sasson	Alignment; Labor Party; Alignment	13, 14	2 January 1967	15 December 1969	
3	Shlomo Hillel	Alignment	15, 16, 17	15 December 1969	20 June 1977	
4	Haim Bar-Lev	Alignment	21, 22, 23	13 September 1984	15 March 1990	
5	Roni Milo	Likud	24	11 June 1990	13 July 1992	
6	Moshe Shahal	Labor Party	25	13 July 1992	22 November 1995	
Minister of Internal Security
–	Moshe Shahal	Labor Party	26	22 November 1995	18 June 1996	
7	Avigdor Kahalani	Third Way	27	18 June 1996	6 July 1999	
8	Shlomo Ben-Ami	One Israel	28	6 July 1999	7 March 2001	
9	Uzi Landau	Likud	29	7 March 2001	28 February 2003	
10	Tzachi Hanegbi	Likud	30	28 February 2003	6 September 2004	
11	Gideon Ezra	Likud; Kadima	30	6 September 2004	4 May 2006	Initially appointed Acting Minister, with position made permanent on 29 November 2004
12	Avi Dichter	Kadima	31	4 May 2006	1 April 2009	
13	Yitzhak Aharonovich	Yisrael Beiteinu	32, 33	1 April 2009	14 May 2015	
14	Yariv Levin	Likud	34	14 May 2015	25 May 2015	
14	Gilad Erdan	Likud	34	25 May 2015	17 May 2020	
15	Amir Ohana	Likud	35	17 May 2020	13 June 2021	
16	Omer Bar-Lev	Labor Party	36	13 June 2021	29 December 2022	
Minister of National Security
17	Itamar Ben-Gvir	Otzma Yehudit	37	29 December 2022	21 January 2025	
–	Haim Katz	Likud	37	23 January 2025	19 March 2025	Acting minister
–	Itamar Ben-Gvir	Otzma Yehudit	37	19 March 2025		

=== Deputy ministers ===
#	Minister	Party	Government	Term start	Term end
1	Gideon Ezra	Likud	29	7 March 2001	28 February 2003
2	Yaakov Edri	Likud; Kadima	30	10 March 2003	18 January 2006
3	Gadi Yevarkan	Likud	35	17 May 2020	13 June 2021
4	Yoav Segalovitz	Yesh Atid	36	13 June 2021	29 December 2022

== Agencies ==
- Israel Police
  - Border Guard
  - Civil Guard
- Firearm Licensing Department
- Israel Anti-Drug & Alcohol Authority (now the National Authority for Community Safety)
- Israel Witness Protection Authority
- Urban enforcement system
- National Headquarters for the Protection of Children on the Internet
- National Guard of Israel
- Israel Fire and Rescue Services (transferred from Ministry of Interior in 2011)
- Israel Prison Service
- Police & Prison Service Personnel Ombudsman

== Unit for Public Inquiries and Complaints ==
The Unit for Public Inquiries and Complaints operates under the aegis of the Internal Audit Division of the Ministry of Internal Security. It handles complaints from citizens against the Israel Police, Prison Service, National Fire and Rescue Authority, Authority for the War on Drugs and Alcohol and Division for Licensing and Inspection of Firearms. In accordance with the Internal Audit Law, the main duties of the division are to ensure that audited entities abide by the law and carry out their duties in an efficient, financially sound, corruption-free manner.
