= Illegal drug trade in Israel =

Trade of illicit substances in Israel

The illegal drug trade in Israel encompasses all the trafficking of illicit substances within the country of Israel. While many drugs are sold and dealt in Israel, Israel is not a major hub for drug traffickers, nor is it a major hotspot for the purchase, transportation, or sale of drugs by consumers. Although Israel as a country does not experience overall high levels of drug trafficking, volume has increased in recent years and 2022 saw a record high number of drug flow through the country.

== International trafficking ==
Drug smugglers commonly attempt to transport illegal substances through Israel's southern border with Egypt between the Sinai and Negev Desert. Hundreds of attempted border crossings occur each year, and Israel has placed a significant police and military presence at the border to combat a growing number of trafficking attempts. 2022 saw a record low $85 million of drugs smuggled into Israel.

The Jordanian border has become a popular location for attempted smuggling of cocaine and hashish since the end of the Second Lebanon War in 2006.

Similar to many other developed countries, Fentanyl smuggling is becoming a larger problem in Israel as citizens become addicted to prescription painkillers. A 2020 study asserted that Israel had the largest Fentanyl abuse rate per capita out of any country in the world.

== Legislation ==
Israel does not currently promote the use or sale of any illegal drugs, and cannabis is not legal for recreational use but this is being reviewed. The Israeli government, through the Israel Anti-Drug Authority, has developed and supported a number of programs domestically to prevent and combat drug trade and use, including amongst youth.
