= National Guard of Israel =

National Guard of Israel המשמר הלאומי של ישראל HaMišmar Ha-Le'umi
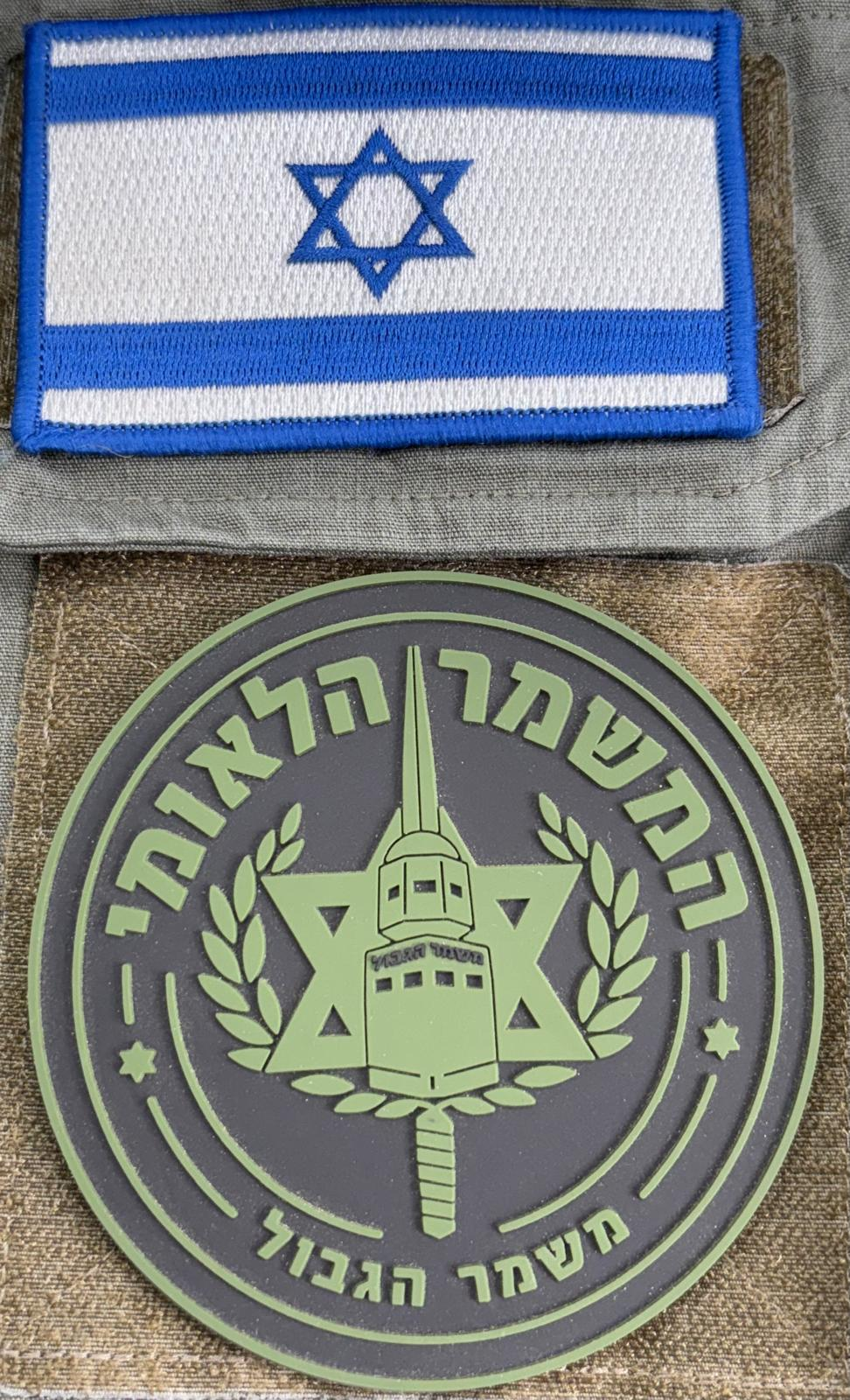
- National Guard sleeve patch
- Common name: Hamishmar Hal'eumi

Agency overview
- Employees: 900

Jurisdictional structure
- National agency: Israel
- Operations jurisdiction: Israel
- Governing body: Israel Police
- General nature: Gendarmerie; Local civilian police

The National Guard of Israel (Hebrew: המשמר הלאומי של ישראל) is an operational body established in 2024 by the Israel Police, following a government resolution aimed at dealing with expanding internal security challenges, including multi-scene events. The unit is organized within the Israel Border Police and is designed to operate in the areas of combating terrorism, handling disturbances, and assisting in dealing with emergency situations. The National Guard operates nationwide and includes regional brigades in the north, center, and south. Its main mission is to strengthen police activity in routine and emergency situations in accordance with operational needs and the instructions of the command echelon.

== History ==
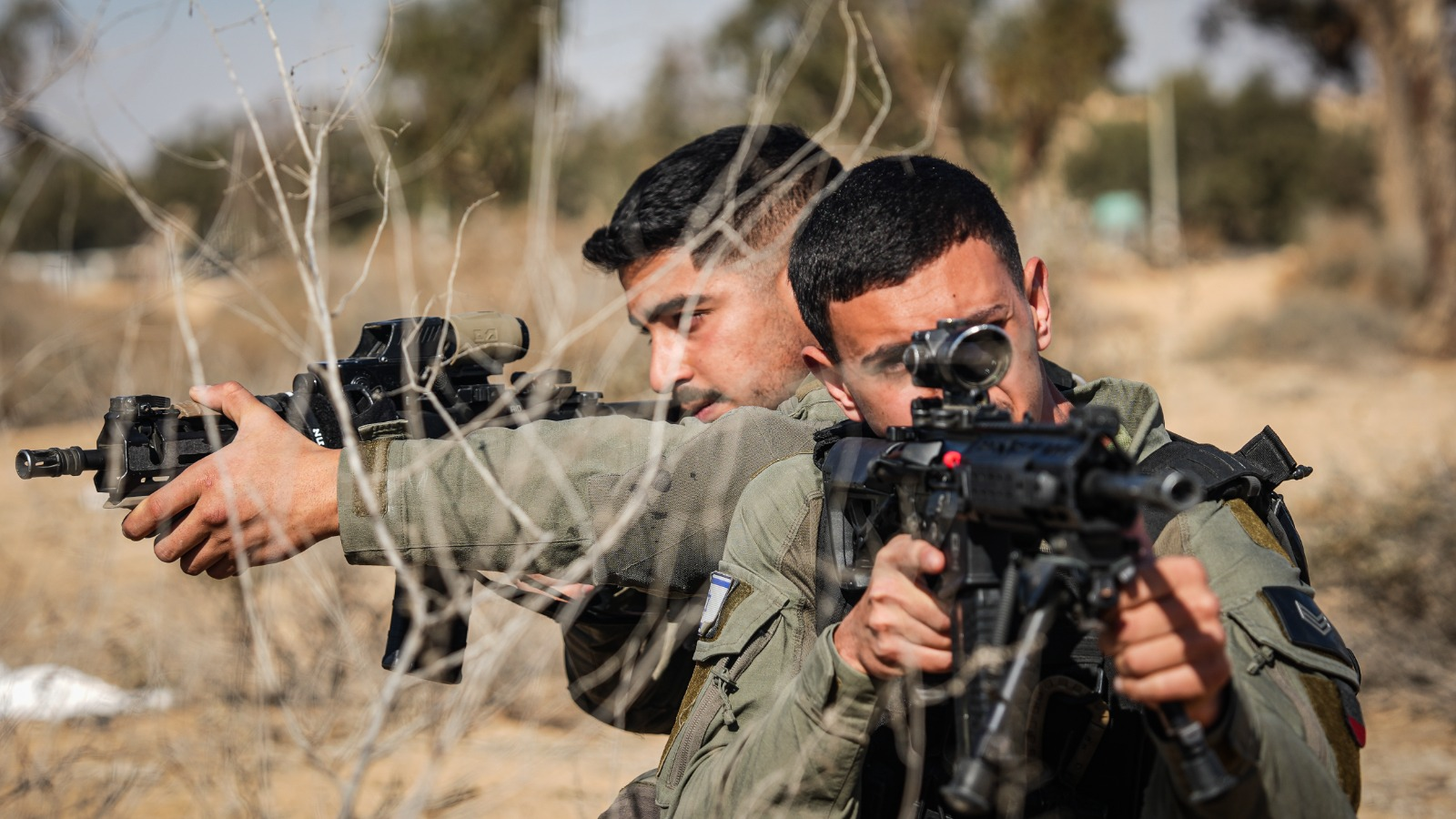
National Guard training

The idea of establishing a National Guard in Israel first came up in 2000, at the initiative of then-Minister of Public Security, Shlomo Ben-Ami. The goal of the initiative was to centralize emergency and rescue agencies – including the Home Front Command, the Israel Fire and Rescue Services, and Magen David Adom – under a single civilian authority that would be subordinate to the Ministry of Public Security. Ben-Ami even proposed separating the Border Police from the Israel Police and the Home Front Command from the IDF, and establishing an independent authority that would bring together all of these bodies. In 2002, the proposal was renewed by the Home Front Command commander at the time, Brigadier General Gabi Ofir.

The practical background for the initiative was sharpened following the events of Operation Guardian of the Walls (May 2021), during which riots and riots on a nationalist basis occurred in many cities, especially in mixed cities. The Israel Police had difficulty coping with the multiple arenas and events, which led to casualties and extensive damage to property. Due to the situation, the integration of IDF forces into domestic civilian activities was considered, but then-Defense Minister Benny Gantz opposed this. Instead, Border Guard forces were recruited to reinforce the police, and regular IDF fighters were positioned in border sectors to allow the Border Guard to operate in cities.

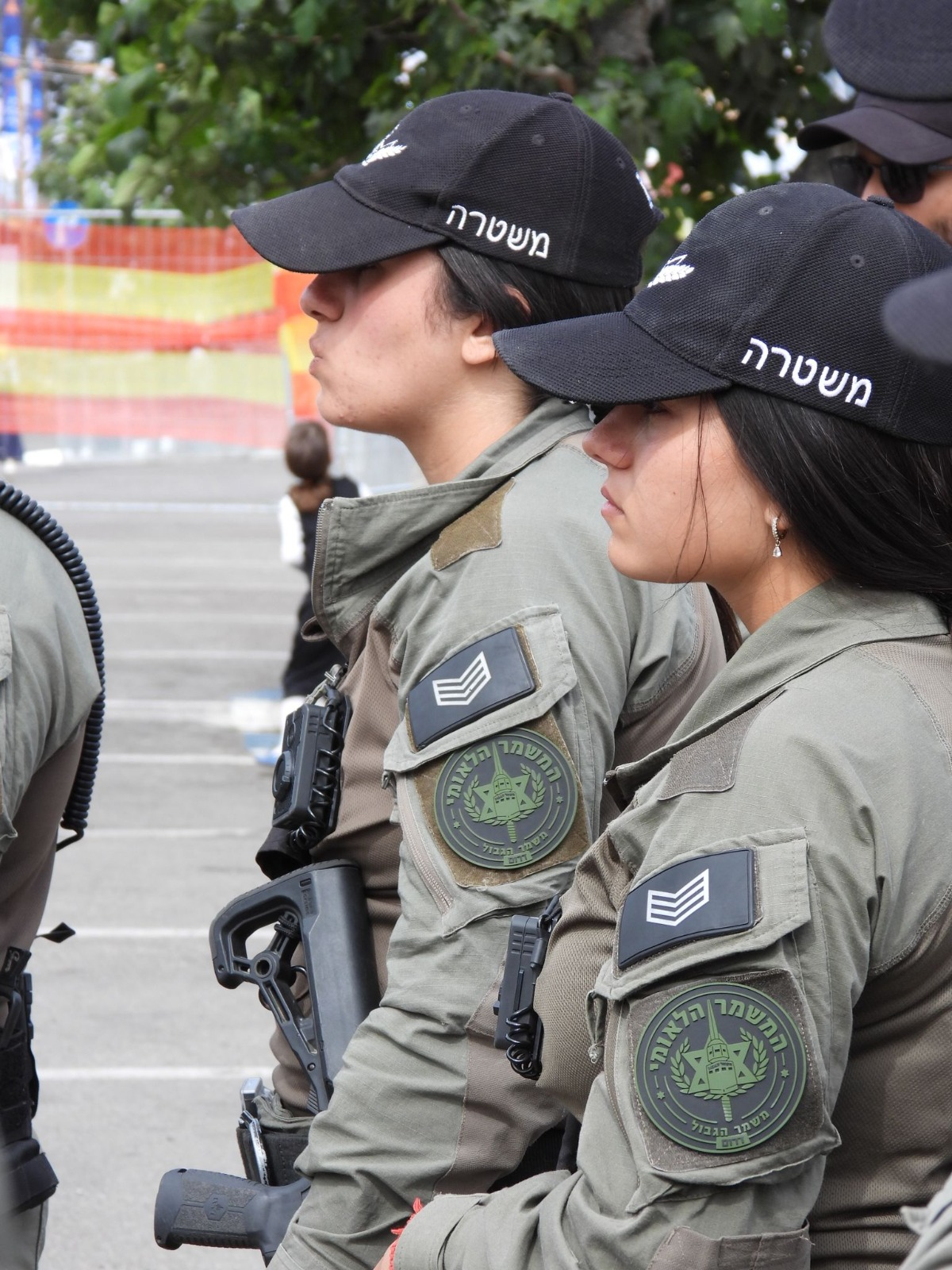
National Guard combat soldiers

During the spring 2022 wave of terror that included Operation Wavebreaker, the need for a dedicated force to respond quickly to security incidents within Israeli territory increased. Among other things, the shooting attack on Dizengoff Street in Tel Aviv revealed difficulties in coordination between the police, the Israel Defense Forces, and the Shin Bet, and emphasized the need to establish a dedicated operational body. Maj. Gen. (Res.) Gershon HaCohen argued that a National Guard is also essential for protecting traffic routes and preventing terrorism through arson.

In June 2022, Member of the Knesset Yoav Kish (Likud) submitted a bill to establish a National Guard. According to the bill, the threshold conditions for service in the Guard included 11 months of full military service, and Guard fighters were supposed to receive powers equivalent to those of police officers. The bill has not passed.

According to resolution No. 442 dated April 2, 2023, issued by the Government of Israel, the Israel National Guard will be established, which will serve as "a skilled and trained dedicated force to handle, among other things, various emergency scenarios, nationalist crime, the fight against terrorism, and to strengthen governance in areas where this is required within the framework of the functions currently held by the Israel Police."

In accordance with the resolution, the committee submitted its recommendations to the Minister of National Security, Itamar Ben-Gvir, which brought them to the government's approval.

Within this framework and as part of the implementation of the resolution, two National Guard brigades were established in May 2024 - a Northern Brigade and a Southern Brigade, in the Border Guard. In May 2025, an additional brigade, the Central District National Guard, was established.

In October 2024, the first National Guard commander, Major General Nachshon Nagler (former Commander of the Border Police), was appointed.

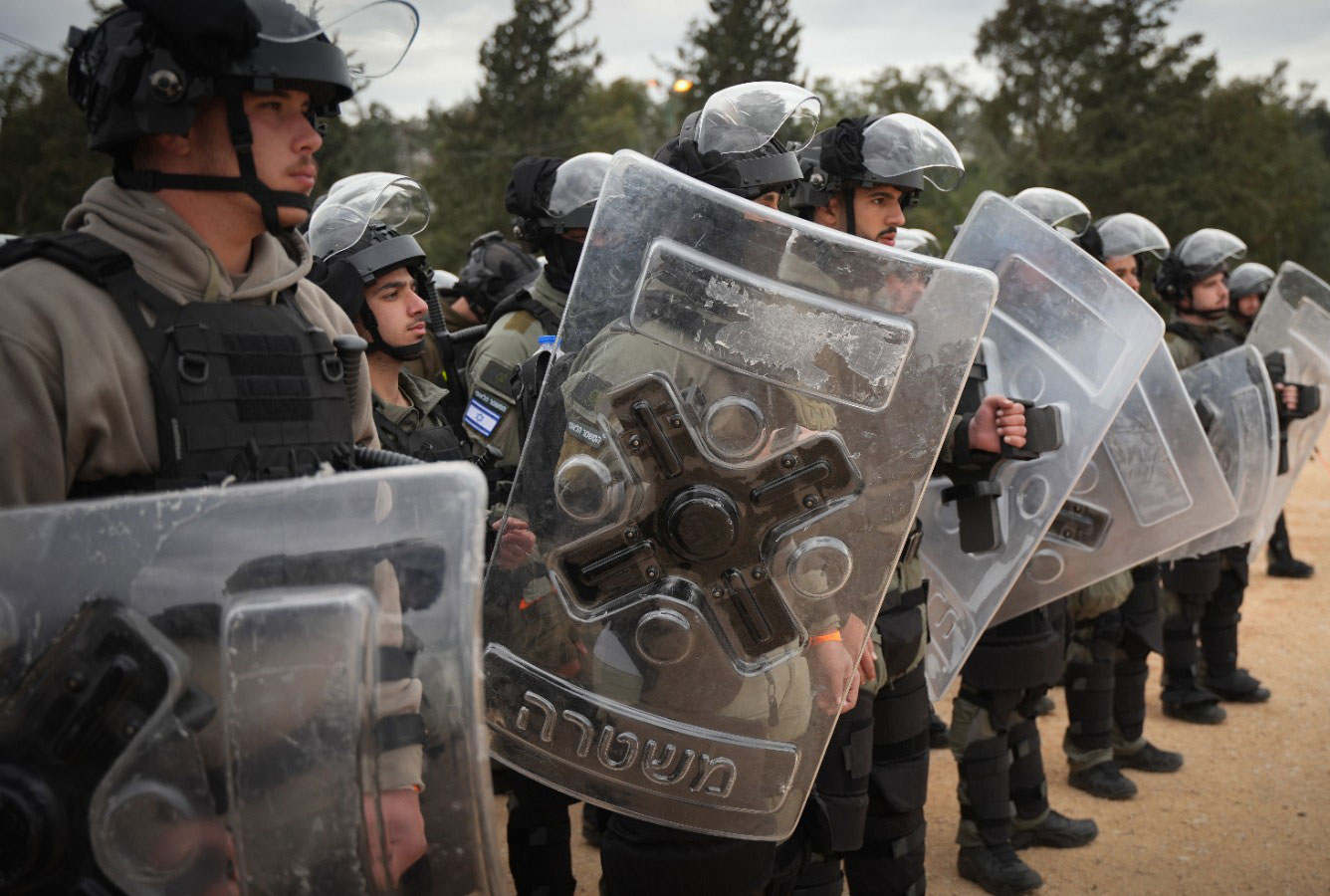
National Guard soldiers in riot control training

In January 2025, a ceremony was held at the National Police College to establish the National Guard in the Border Guard-Israel Police, with the participation of the Minister of National Security, Itamar Ben-Gvir, the Commissioner-General of the Police, Danny Levy, the Commander of the Border Police, Nachshon Nagler, and other commanders.

The National Guard currently began with approximately 600 fighters, some of whom are conscripts, and with the filling of the ranks in the Central Brigade, the National Guard is expected to have approximately 900 fighters and commanders. On November 14, 2022, the National Guard launched Operation "Roaming Storm" against crime in the Hof District in the Menashe Region (an area that includes Zikhron Ya'akov, Hadera, Umm al-Fahm, and more). In the operation, twenty suspects were arrested and detained for questioning, and weapons were seized.

On February 19, 2025, the Northern Brigade forces of the National Guard participated in the evacuation of protesters who were celebrating the government's policies in Jerusalem. On several occasions, Guard officers were recorded beating protesters in an attempt to evacuate them, and two protesters were evacuated for medical treatment.

== Duties ==
The National Guard is an operational force within the Israel Border Police, the operational arm of the Israel Police, established to provide a focused response to multi-focal events such as riots, internal terrorism and civil emergencies. Its establishment was intended to improve the police's ability to deal with internal security challenges while operating trained forces in various sectors in a coordinated manner.

In accordance with Government Decision 442, the National Guard is defined as a dedicated national-state force operating in the following areas:

In an emergency: responding to riots on a nationalist basis, combating terrorism and assisting in protecting the home front. In times of peace its duties include increasing the security presence in the public space, assisting police districts in handling serious crime and tasks related to lack of governance.

The National Guard's duties also include guarding main traffic routes, securing open areas, supporting police activity in mixed cities and handling agricultural crime. The Border Guard operates in three regional districts (North, Center, and South), under the command of the Border Guard Commander and in accordance with an operational situation assessment.
