= Development Minister of Israel =

Portfolio in the Israeli cabinet between 1953 and 1974

Ministry of Development
- משרד הפיתוח
- Emblem of Israel

Agency overview
- Formed: 1953
- Dissolved: 1974
- Jurisdiction: Government of Israel

Minister of Development (Hebrew: שר הפיתוח, Sar HaPituah) was a portfolio in the Israeli cabinet between 1953 and 1974. The ministry was responsible for government-owned mineral extraction companies and the country's geology institute. The department also set up both the quarry rehabilitation fund and the Dead Sea Works.

The post was scrapped in 1974, and succeeded three years later by the Energy and Infrastructure portfolio. Since 2005 there has also been a Minister for the Development of the Negev and Galilee.

== List of ministers ==
#	Minister	Party	Government	Term start	Term end	Notes
1	Dov Yosef	Mapai	4, 5, 6	15 June 1953	3 November 1955	
2	Mordechai Bentov	Mapam	7, 8, 9	3 November 1955	2 November 1961	
3	Giora Yoseftal	Mapai	10	2 November 1961	23 August 1962	Died in office
4	Yosef Almogi	Mapai	10, 11, 12	30 October 1962	25 May 1965	
5	Haim Yosef Zadok	Mapai	12	31 May 1965	12 January 1966	
6	Moshe Kol	Not an MK	13, 14	12 January 1966	15 December 1969	Member of the Independent Liberals, resigned from the Knesset when appointed minister in line with party policy
7	Haim Landau	Gahal	15	15 December 1969	6 August 1970	
8	Haim Gvati	Alignment	15	1 September 1970	10 March 1974	
9	Haim Bar-Lev	Not an MK	16	10 March 1974	3 June 1974	Later elected to the next Knesset as a member of the Alignment.

=== Deputy ministers ===
#	Minister	Party	Government	Term start	Term end
1	Yehuda Sha'ari	Independent Liberals	13, 14	17 January 1966	15 December 1969
