= Ministry of Interior (Israel) =

Government ministry of Israel

- משרד הפנים
- Ministry emblem

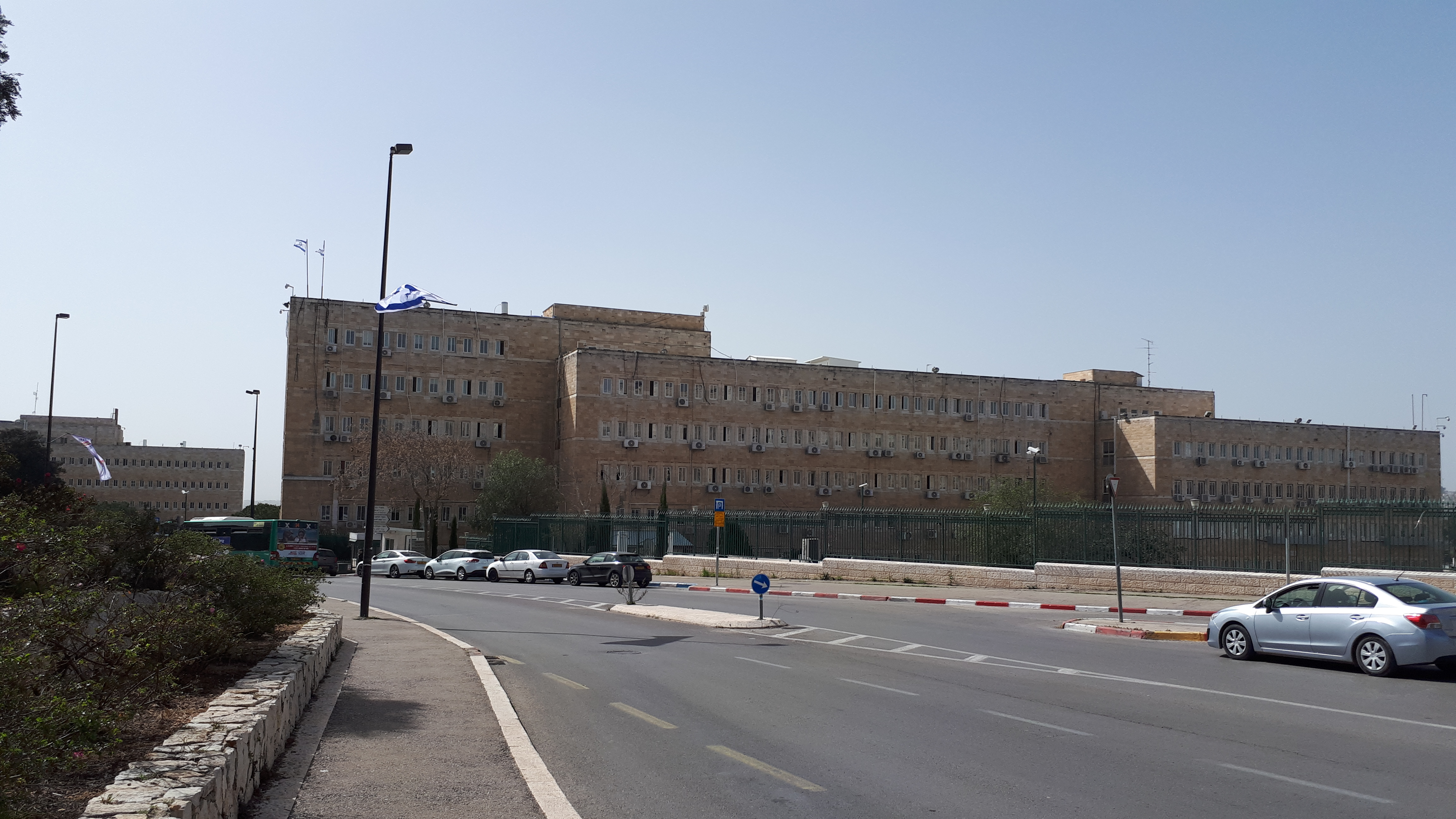
- Ministry headquarters

Agency overview
- Formed: 1948
- Jurisdiction: Government of Israel
- Headquarters: 2 Kaplan St., Kiryat HaMemshala, Jerusalem; 31°46′44.07″N 35°12′5.08″E
- Minister responsible: Gideon Sa'ar
- Agency executive: Ronen Peretz, Director-General
- Child agency: Population and Immigration Authority
- Website: www.moin.gov.il

The Ministry of Interior (Hebrew: משרד הפנים, romanized: Misrad HaPnim; Arabic: وزارة الداخلية) in the State of Israel is one of the government offices that is responsible for local government, citizenship and residency, identity cards, and student and entry visas.

== Responsibilities ==
- Providing citizenship and permanent resident status.
- Issuing of entry visas and staying visas in the country.
- Inhabitants administration: personal registration
  - Issuing of Israeli identity cards.
  - Issuing of Israeli passports.
  - Personal registrations such as birth, marriage etc.
- Local government, city councils and local councils supervision
  - Appointing and dismissing District Commissioners
- Elections
- Associations
- Planning and building supervising

== Departments ==
- Local Government Administration
- Planning Administration
- Emergency Service Administration
- National Biometric Database Authority
- Population and Immigration Authority
- National Planning Headquarters

== List of ministers ==
#	Name	Party	Governments	Term start	Term end	Notes
1	Yitzhak Gruenbaum	Independent	P	14 May 1948	10 March 1949	
2	Haim-Moshe Shapira	United Religious Front, Hapoel HaMizrachi	1, 2, 3	10 March 1949	24 December 1952	
3	Israel Rokah	General Zionists	4, 5	24 December 1952	29 June 1955	
–	Haim-Moshe Shapira	Hapoel HaMizrachi	6	29 June 1955	3 November 1955	
4	Israel Bar-Yehuda	Ahdut HaAvoda	7, 8	3 November 1955	17 December 1959	
–	Haim-Moshe Shapira	National Religious Party	9, 10, 11, 12, 13, 14, 15	17 December 1959	16 July 1970	
5	Golda Meir	Alignment	15	16 July 1970	1 September 1970	Serving Prime Minister
6	Yosef Burg	National Religious Party	15, 16	1 September 1970	3 June 1974	
7	Shlomo Hillel	Alignment	17	3 June 1974	29 October 1974	
–	Yosef Burg	National Religious Party	17	29 October 1974	22 December 1976	
–	Shlomo Hillel	Alignment	17	16 January 1977	20 June 1977	
–	Yosef Burg	National Religious Party	18, 19, 20	20 June 1977	13 September 1984	
8	Shimon Peres	Alignment	21	13 September 1984	24 December 1984	Serving Prime Minister
9	Yitzhak Peretz	Shas	21, 22	24 December 1984	6 January 1987	
10	Yitzhak Shamir	Likud	22	6 January 1987	22 December 1988	Serving Prime Minister
11	Aryeh Deri	Shas	23, 24, 25	22 December 1988	11 May 1993	
12	Yitzhak Rabin	Labor Party	25	11 May 1993	7 June 1993	Serving Prime Minister
–	Aryeh Deri	Shas	25	7 June 1993	14 September 1993	
–	Yitzhak Rabin	Labor Party	25	14 September 1993	27 February 1995	Serving Prime Minister
13	Uzi Baram	Labor Party	25	27 February 1995	7 June 1995	
14	David Libai	Labor Party	25	19 June 1995	18 July 1995	
15	Ehud Barak	Labor Party	25	18 July 1995	22 November 1995	
16	Haim Ramon	Labor Party	26	22 November 1995	18 June 1996	
17	Eli Suissa	Not an MK	27	18 June 1996	6 July 1999	
18	Natan Sharansky	Yisrael BaAliyah	28	6 July 1999	11 July 2000	
–	Haim Ramon	One Israel	28	11 July 2000	7 March 2001	
19	Eli Yishai	Shas	29	7 March 2001	23 May 2002	
20	Ariel Sharon	Likud	29	23 May 2002	3 June 2002	Serving Prime Minister
–	Eli Yishai	Shas	29	3 June 2002	28 February 2003	
21	Avraham Poraz	Shinui	30	28 February 2003	4 December 2004	
22	Ophir Pines-Paz	Labor Party	30	10 January 2005	23 November 2005	
–	Ariel Sharon	Kadima	30	23 November 2005	4 May 2006	Serving Prime Minister
23	Roni Bar-On	Kadima	31	4 May 2006	4 July 2007	
24	Meir Sheetrit	Kadima	31	4 July 2007	31 March 2009	
–	Eli Yishai	Shas	32	31 March 2009	18 March 2013	
25	Gideon Sa'ar	Likud	33	18 March 2013	5 November 2014	
26	Gilad Erdan	Likud	33	5 November 2014	14 May 2015	
27	Silvan Shalom	Likud	34	14 May 2015	27 December 2015	
28	Benjamin Netanyahu	Likud	34	27 December 2015	11 January 2016	Serving Prime Minister
–	Aryeh Deri	Shas	34, 35	11 January 2016	13 June 2021	
29	Ayelet Shaked	Yamina	36	13 June 2021	29 December 2022	
30	Aryeh Deri	Shas	37	29 December 2022	24 January 2023	
–	Michael Malchieli	Shas	37	24 January 2023	19 April 2023	Served as Acting Minister following Aryeh Deri's dismissal
31	Moshe Arbel	Shas	37	19 April 2023	22 July 2025	Resigned in July 2025
–	Benjamin Netanyahu	Likud	37	July 2025	July 2025	
–	Yariv Levin	Likud	37	29 July 2025	22 October 2025	Interim
	Gideon Sa'ar	Likud	37	11 November 2026		

=== Deputy ministers ===
#	Name	Party	Governments	Term start	Term end
1	Shlomo-Yisrael Ben-Meir	National Religious Party	9, 10, 11, 12, 13, 14	28 December 1959	15 December 1969
2	Yosef Goldschmidt	National Religious Party	15	22 December 1969	16 July 1970
–	Yosef Goldschmidt	National Religious Party	15	19 July 1970	1 September 1970
3	Rafael Pinhasi	Shas	23	15 January 1990	11 June 1990
4	Salah Tarif	Labor Party	25	27 November 1995	18 June 1996
5	David Azulai	Shas	29	2 May 2001	23 May 2002
–	David Azulai	Shas	29	3 June 2002	28 February 2003
6	Victor Brailovsky	Shinui	30	5 March 2003	29 November 2004
7	Ruhama Avraham	Kadima	30	30 March 2005	4 May 2006
8	Yaron Mazuz	Likud	34	14 June 2015	11 January 2016
9	Meshulam Nahari	Shas	34	13 January 2016	26 January 2020
10	Yoav Ben-Tzur	Shas	35	25 May 2020	13 June 2021
