= Yosef Goldschmidt =

Israeli politician (1907–1981)

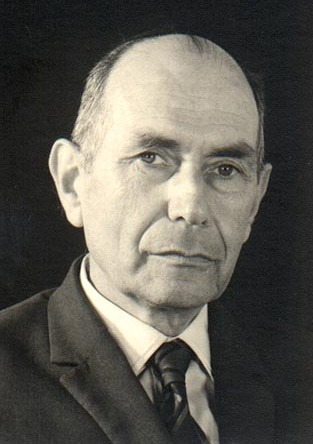

Faction represented in the Knesset
- 1969–1974: National Religious Party

Personal details
- Born: 1907 Frankfurt am Main, Germany
- Died: 25 July 1981 (aged 73–74)

Yosef Goldschmidt (Hebrew: יוסף גולדשמידט; 1907 – 25 July 1981) was an Israeli politician who served as a member of the Knesset for the National Religious Party between 1969 and 1974.

== Biography ==
Born in Frankfurt am Main, Goldschmidt was educated at a yeshiva, and studied at Goethe University Frankfurt, the Ludwig-Maximilians-Universität München and the University of London. He was certified as a high school biology, chemistry and geography teacher.

In 1935, he made aliyah to Mandatory Palestine, where he worked as a teacher. Between 1942 and 1948 he was a schools' supervisor, before becoming a supervisor of the Mizrachi school network. In 1952, he was appointed deputy director general of the Ministry of Education and Culture, becoming director of the religious education Section the following year, remaining in post until 1968.

Goldschmidt was thirteenth on the National Religious Party list for the 1969 elections. Although the party won only twelve seats, he entered the Knesset on 15 December that year as a replacement for Yosef Burg, who had resigned his seat after being given a ministerial post. Goldschmidt himself was made Deputy Minister of Internal Affairs. However, he was not on the party's list for the 1973 elections, and lost his seat.

In 1974, he became Deputy Mayor of Jerusalem. He died in July 1981.
