= Haim Landau =

Irgun member and Israeli politician

- חיים לנדאו
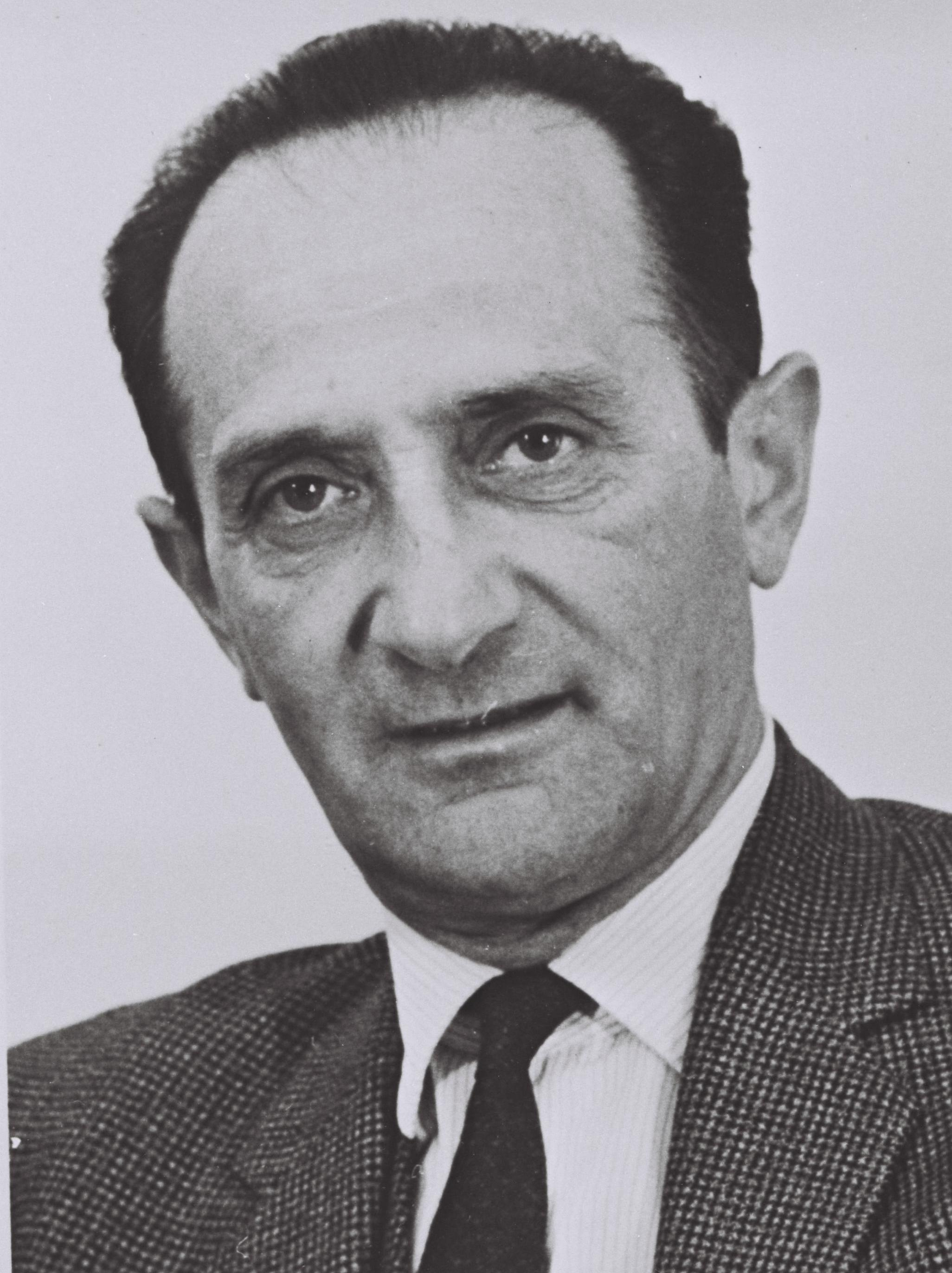

Ministerial roles
- 1969–1970: Minister of Development
- 1978–1979: Minister without Portfolio
- 1979–1981: Minister of Transportation

Faction represented in the Knesset
- 1949–1965: Herut
- 1965–1974: Gahal
- 1974–1977: Likud

Personal details
- Born: 10 September 1916 Kraków, Austria-Hungary
- Died: 16 October 1981 (aged 65)

Haim Landau (Hebrew: חיים לנדאו; 10 September 1916 – 16 October 1981) was an Israeli independence fighter, Knesset member and Minister in the governments of Golda Meir and Menachem Begin.

== Career ==
Landau was born in Kraków, Austria-Hungary (today in Poland) and made aliyah to Mandate Palestine in 1935. He soon joined Betar and the Irgun and, according to the Irgun website, "took part in reprisals against the Arabs" while still finding time to complete his studies at the Technion as a construction engineer.

By 1940, he was a commander of the Betar branch in Haifa, and in early 1944 was transferred to Tel Aviv and appointed member of the General Headquarters by the end of year. In 1947, he represented the Irgun, together with Begin and Shmuel Katz, at a meeting with the UNSCOP.

== Post-independence ==
Landau was among the founders of the Herut, and was a member of the first to eighth Knessets. He was a member of the Begin cabinet, serving as Minister of Development in 1967–1970 and despite not retaining his seat in the 1977 elections, was made Minister of Transport by Menachem Begin, a role he retained until the 1981 elections.

=== Commemoration ===
After his death, the Ministry of Transportation renamed Highway 5 after him. A bridge over the Ayalon highway and streets in Ramat Gan, Bnei Brak, Holon, Be'er Sheva, Giv'at Shmuel and Ramat Hasharon are named after him.
