= Israel Anti-Drug Authority =

Israel National Authority for Community Safety הרשות הלאומית לביטחון קהילתי
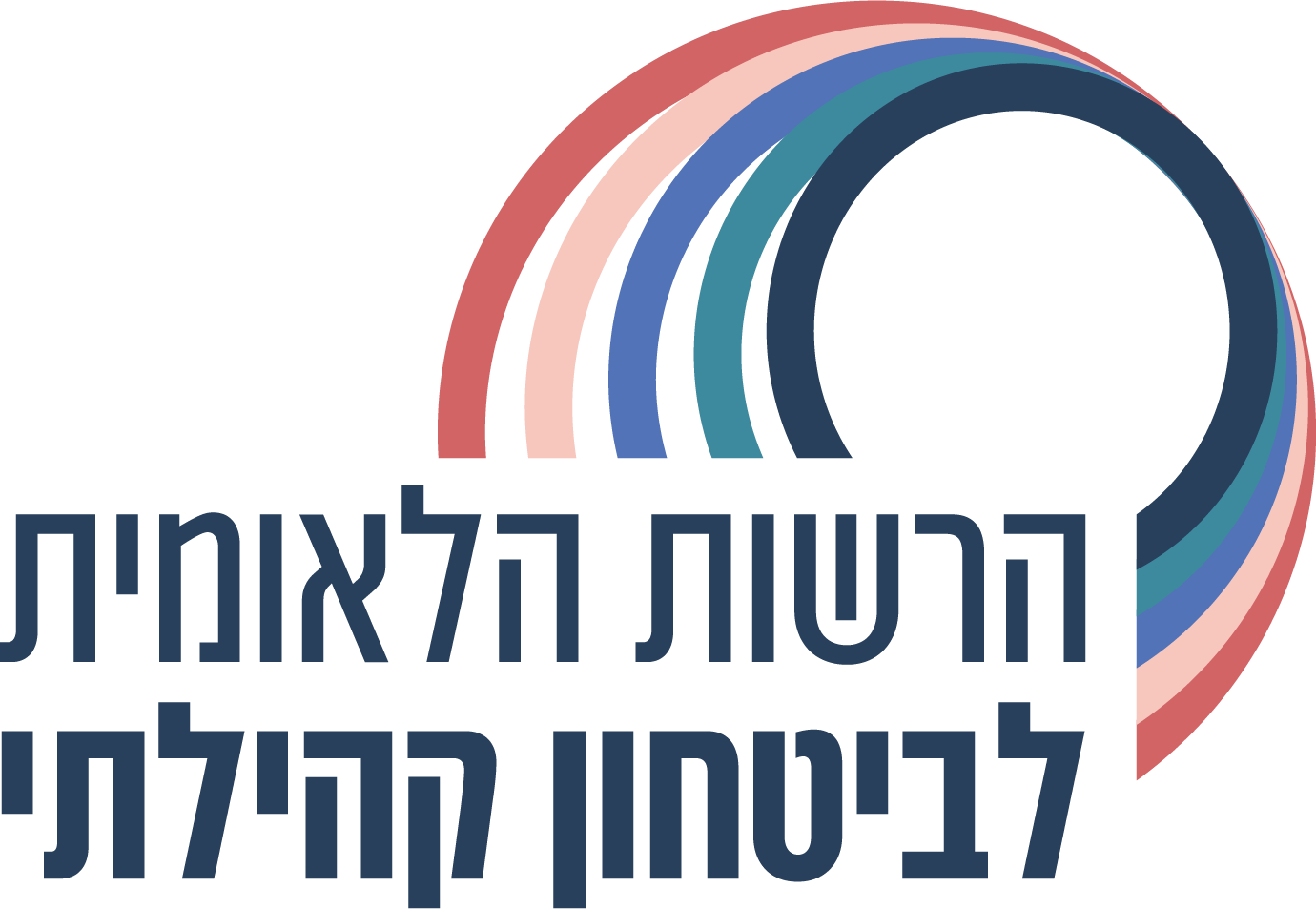

Agency overview
- Formed: 1988

Jurisdictional structure
- Operations jurisdiction: ISR
- Legal jurisdiction: Israel
- Governing body: Government of Israel
- General nature: Civilian police

Operational structure
- Headquarters: Kanfei Nesharim, 7; Givat Shaul Jerusalem, Israel
- Elected officer responsible: Haim Katz, Minister of National Security
- Agency executive: Ronit Ovadiah, General-Director
- Parent agency: Prime Minister Office
- Child agency: "Dror" Anti-Drugs Unit

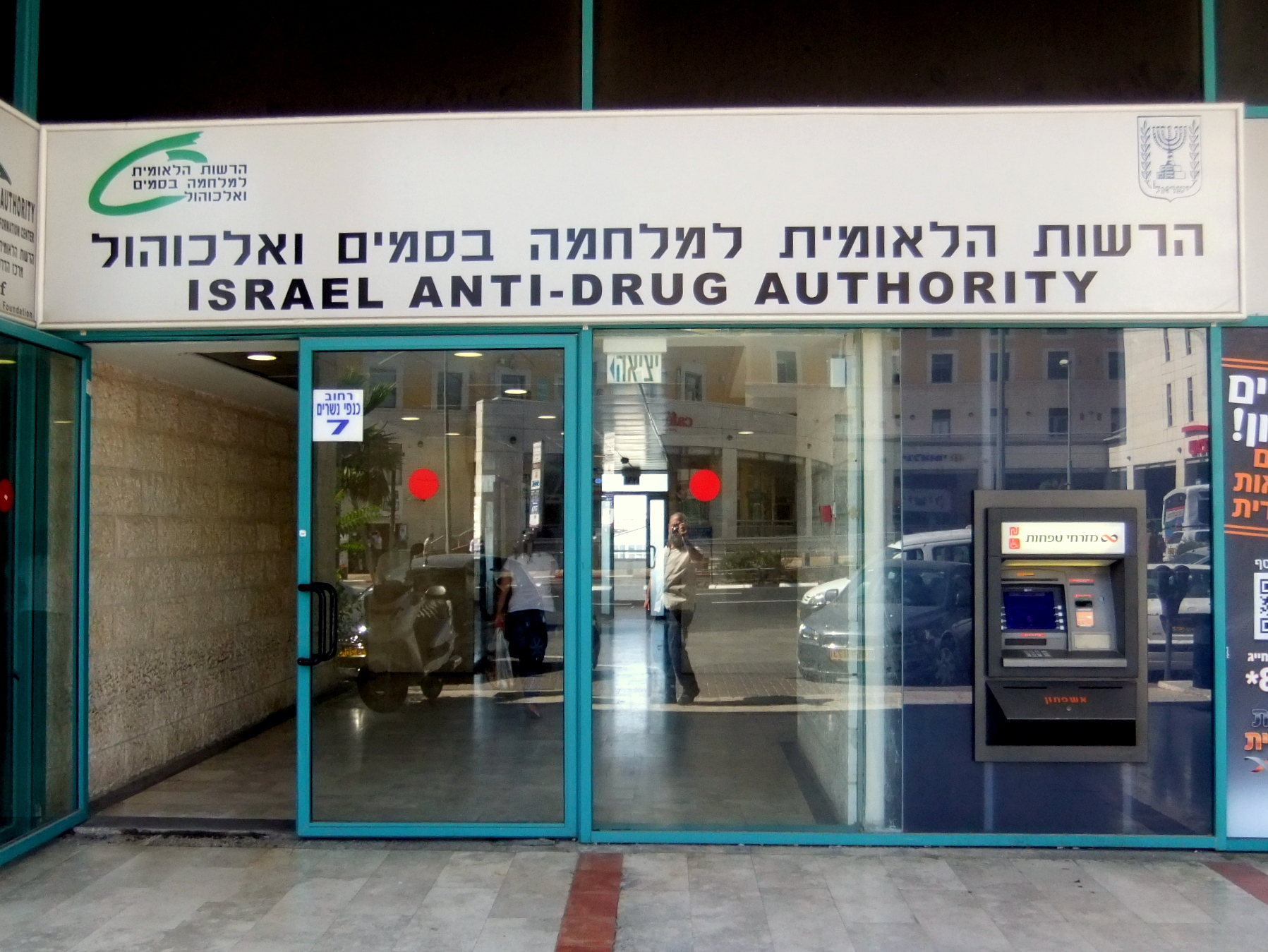
Israel Anti-Drugs Authority Offices in Jerusalem.

Israel National Authority for Community Safety (Hebrew: הרשות הלאומית לביטחון קהילתי) is a governmental law enforcement agency of executive authority responsible for drafting state policy, legal regulation, control and monitoring in combating trafficking drugs, psychotropic substances, and their precursors. IADA is a quasi-governmental agency, which operates under the aegis of the Prime Minister.

The authority is specially authorized to address and solve problems relating to traffic in narcotic drugs, psychotropic substances, and their precursors; The Authority is also authorized to combat the illicit drug trafficking.

== History ==
IADA was established after the passage of the Israel Anti-Drug Authority Law at the end of 1988.

In 2005, the Israeli government extended The Authority's mandate to include the battle on alcohol abuse. In 2009, the Knesset approved a decision granting the Ministry of Public Security responsibility for The Authority.

In May 2020, it was subordinated to the newly created Ministry for Community Empowerment and Advancement.

Since 2009, the full name is Israel's Anti-Drugs and Alcohol National Authority. On 2017, its name was changed to The National Authority for Community Safety, and became part of the Ministry of National Security.

== Missions ==
The principal duties, as defined by law, are to lead the national war on drugs and alcohol abuse by:

- Formulating all national policies related to education, prevention, treatment and rehabilitation.
- Coordinating inter-ministerial and inter-institutional cooperation and activities.
- Initiating and developing educational and public awareness materials.
- Treating and rehabilitating victims of substance abuse, and their families.
- Supervising all areas related to law enforcement, and all institutions' respective roles in this area.
- Organizing communal awareness and prevention programs nationwide.
- Conducting research to track trends in use and to evaluate project implementation.
- Recruiting and training qualified professionals to lead the war on drugs from the bottom up.
- Providing national information services in many formats, through many vehicles and across the spectrum of the Israeli society.
- Recruiting volunteers to complement the professionals' role.
- Promoting drug-related public awareness materials in order to create a social climate which rejects drug use.
- Sponsoring drug related research, including national surveys and municipal surveys on drug abuse to track the extent of drug use and evaluation research on activities carried out by IADA and other institutions.
- Training professional staff to lead the war on drugs.
- Leading community work.
