= Binyamin Shahor =

Israeli politician (1916–1979)

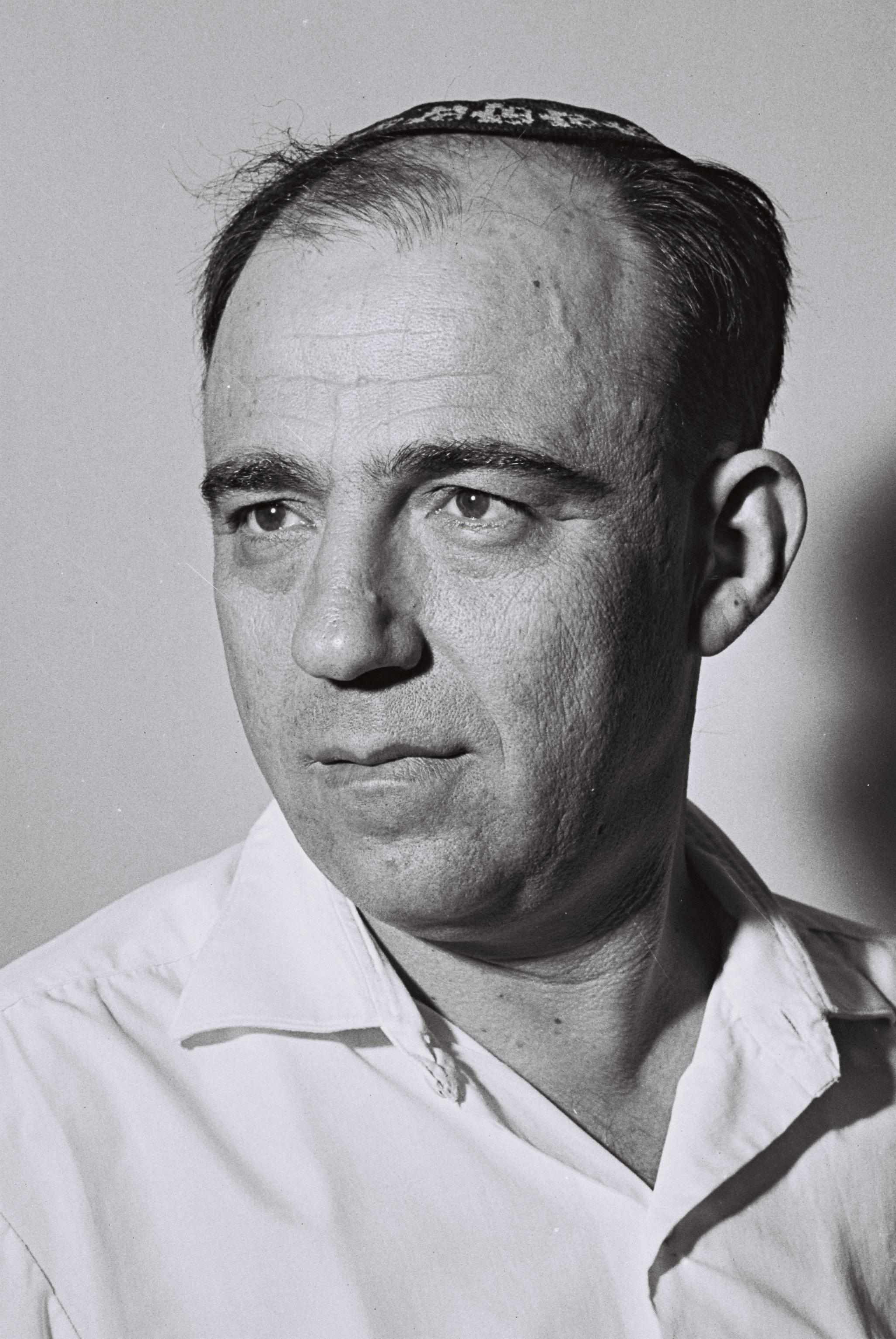
- Shahor in 1959

Faction represented in the Knesset
- 1959–1974: National Religious Party

Personal details
- Born: 1916 Jerusalem, Ottoman Empire
- Died: 26 November 1979 (aged 62–63)

Binyamin Shahor (Hebrew: בנימין שחור, 1916 – 26 November 1979) was an Israeli politician who served as a member of the Knesset for the National Religious Party between 1959 and 1974.

== Biography ==
Born in Jerusalem during the Ottoman era, Shahor received a religious education. In 1929 he joined Bnei Akiva, and became one of its leaders. In 1939 he was amongst the founders of the Bnei Akiva yeshiva in Kfar Haroeh. One of the leaders of Hapoel HaMizrachi, he managed HaTzofe for several years.

After the National Religious Party was formed in 1956, Shahor became its secretary general. He was elected to the Knesset in 1959. He retained his seat in elections in 1961 and 1965, and on 1 February 1966 was appointed Deputy Minister of Religions, a position he held until 17 November 1969. He was re-elected in 1969, but lost his seat in the 1973 elections.

He died in 1979.
