= Yisrael Barzilai =

Israeli politician (1913–1970)

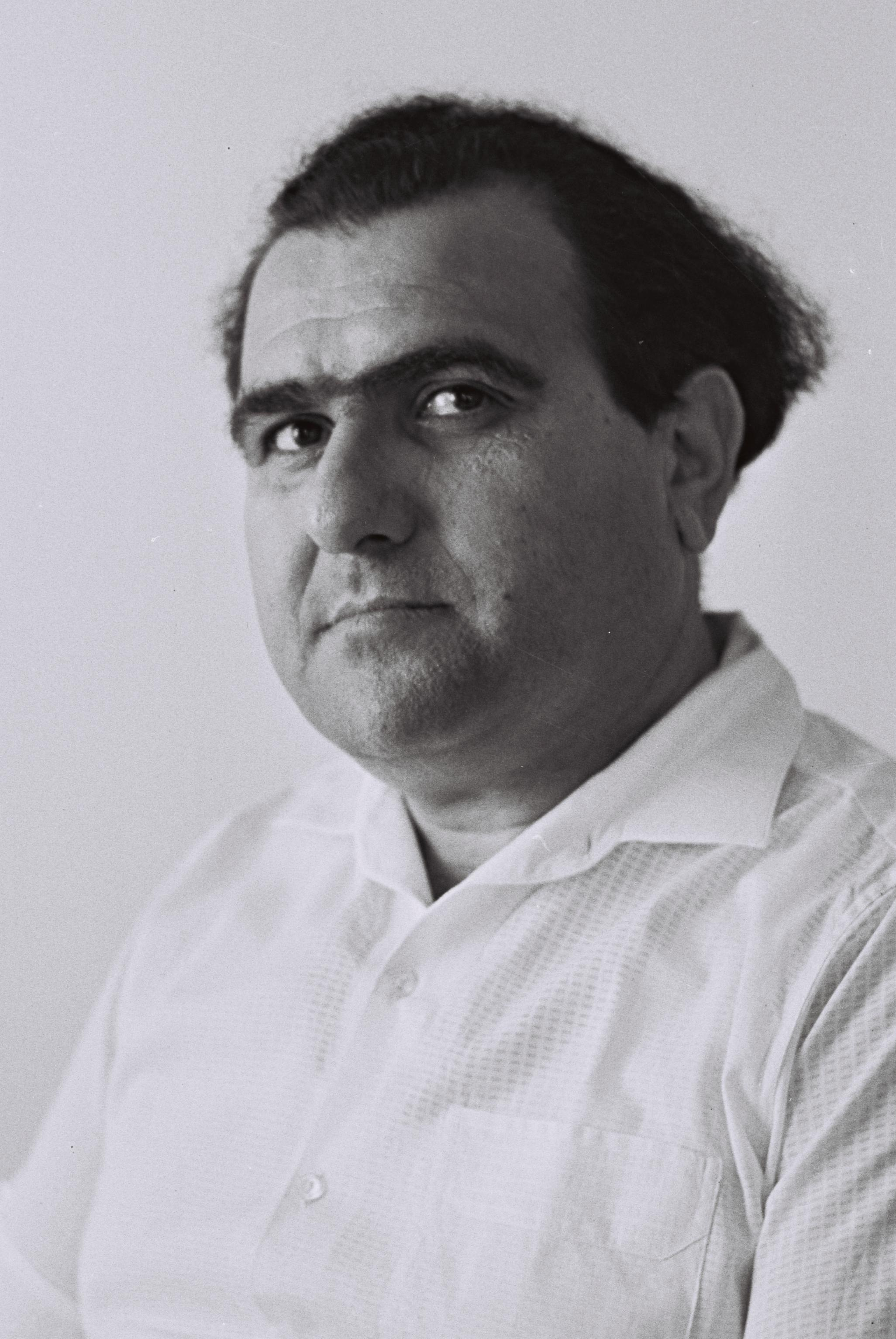
- Barzilai in 1955

Ministerial roles
- 1955–1961: Minister of Health
- 1958–1959: Minister of Postal Services
- 1966–1969: Minister of Health
- 1969–1970: Minister without Portfolio

Faction represented in the Knesset
- 1955–1965: Mapam

Personal details
- Born: 1 October 1913 Nieszawa, Russian Empire
- Died: 12 June 1970 (aged 56)

Yisrael Barzilai (Hebrew: ישראל ברזילי; 1 October 1913 – 12 June 1970) was an Israeli politician who served as a government minister during the 1950s, 1960s and early 1970s.

== Life and career ==
Born Yisrael Eisenberg in Nieszawa in the Russian Empire (today in Poland), Barzilai joined Hashomer Hatzair at the age of 11. In 1932 he moved to Paris to study, before emigrating to Mandatory Palestine in 1934. In Palestine he joined the HeHalutz movement, and in 1938 was elected head of the independent settlements department of Kibbutz Artzi. In 1939 he was one of the founders of kibbutz Negba.

In 1947 he became secretary of the World Union of Mapam. Between 1948 and 1951 he worked as the first Israeli envoy in Poland. After returning to Israel, he served as political secretary of Mapam between 1953 and 1955.

He was first elected to the Knesset on Mapam's list in 1955, and was appointed Minister of Health in David Ben-Gurion's government. In November 1958 he also became Minister of Postal Services after the National Religious Party withdrew from the government. After the 1959 elections he continued as Minister of Health.

Although he was re-elected in 1961, Mapam were excluded from the government and Barzilai lost his cabinet position. However, he did serve as Deputy Speaker of the Knesset. In the 1965 elections he lost his seat, but was re-appointed Minister of Health by Levi Eshkol. Following the 1969 elections (in which he also failed to win a seat) he was appointed Minister without Portfolio, serving until his death in June 1970. Following his death, the hospital in Ashkelon (whose cornerstone he had laid in 1961) was renamed Barzilai Medical Center in his honour.
