= Moshe Kol =

Israeli politician

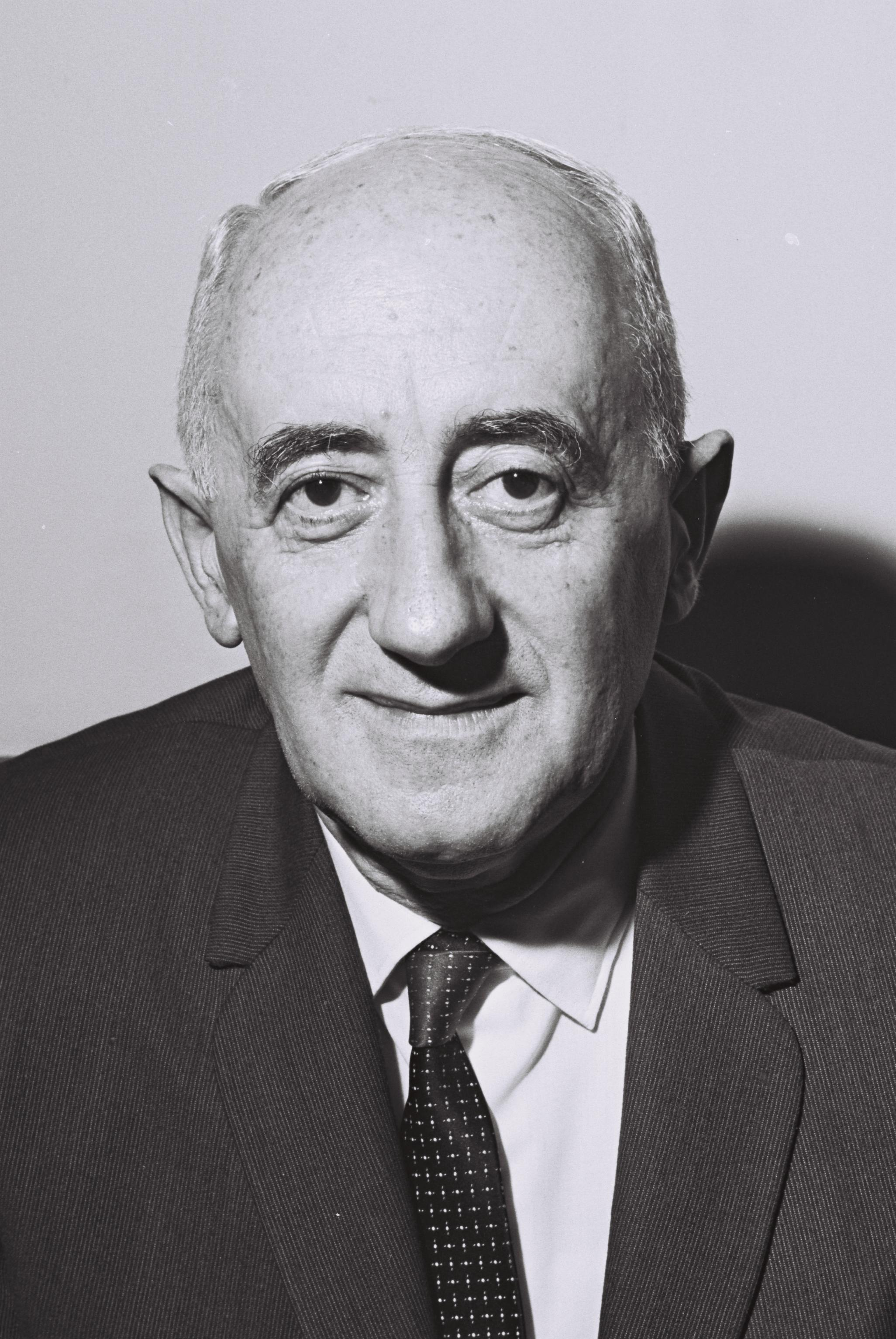
- Kol in 1966

Ministerial roles
- 1966–1969: Minister of Development
- 1966–1977: Minister of Tourism

Faction represented in the Knesset
- 1951: Progressive Party
- 1959–1961: Progressive Party
- 1961–1965: Liberal Party
- 1965–1966: Independent Liberals
- 1969: Independent Liberals
- 1974: Independent Liberals

Personal details
- Born: 28 May 1911 Pinsk, Russian Empire
- Died: 7 July 1989 (aged 78)
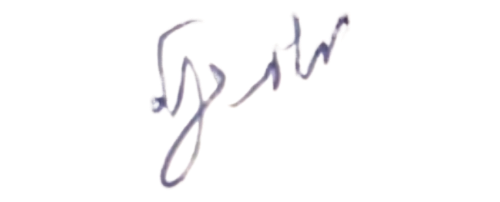
- Signature

Moshe Kol (Hebrew: משה קול; 28 May 1911 – 7 July 1989) was a Zionist activist and Israeli politician and one of the signatories of the Israeli declaration of independence.

== Biography ==
Born Moshe Kolodny in Pinsk in the Russian Empire (today in Belarus), Kol studied at a heder and Hebrew high school in his home town and was one of the founders of HaOved HaTzioni youth movement in Poland.

He emigrated to Mandatory Palestine in 1932 and joined Kibbutz Hamefales in Kfar Saba, which was associated with HaOved HaTzioni. He joined the Histadrut trade union, serving as a member of its executive between 1941 and 1946, and also sat on the board of directors of the Jewish Agency for Israel, where he headed the Youth Aliyah department.

On 15 May 1948 Kol was one of the people to sign the Israeli declaration of independence, and became a member of the Provisional State Council. He was also one of the founders of the Progressive Party.

In July 1951 he was elected to the Knesset, but resigned six weeks later. He returned to the Knesset following the 1959 elections, and shortly after became a Liberal Party MK when it was formed by a merger of the Progressive Party and the General Zionists. After retaining his seat in the 1961 elections, Kol was part of a group of largely ex-Progressive Party members which broke away from the Liberal Party to form the Independent Liberals in protest at its impending merger with Menachem Begin's Herut.

Following the 1965 elections, the Independent Liberals joined Levi Eshkol's coalition, and Kol was appointed Minister of Tourism and Minister of Development. In accordance with party policy, he resigned from the Knesset upon being appointed to the cabinet. After elections in 1969 and 1973 Kol was again appointed Minister of Tourism, and again vacated his Knesset seat.

He lost his place in the Knesset in the 1977 elections when the party was reduced to just one seat. After leaving the Knesset he wrote several books on Israeli society and foreign affairs, and died in 1989.

== Published works ==
- Review of Youth Aliyah (1961) (Hebrew)
- Paths in Zionism and Liberalism (1964) (Hebrew)
- Paths in education and rehabilitation (1964) (Hebrew)
- The Struggle for Religious and Cultural Pluralism (1979) (Hebrew)
- The Struggle for Arab-Jewish Cooperation in Israel (1979) (Hebrew)
- Pathways: Autobiographical Events (1981) (Hebrew)
- Struggles and Projects (1984) (Hebrew)
- The Lebanese War and the Situation in the Occupied Territories (1984) (Hebrew)
