= Yehuda Sha'ari =

Israeli politician (1920–1997)

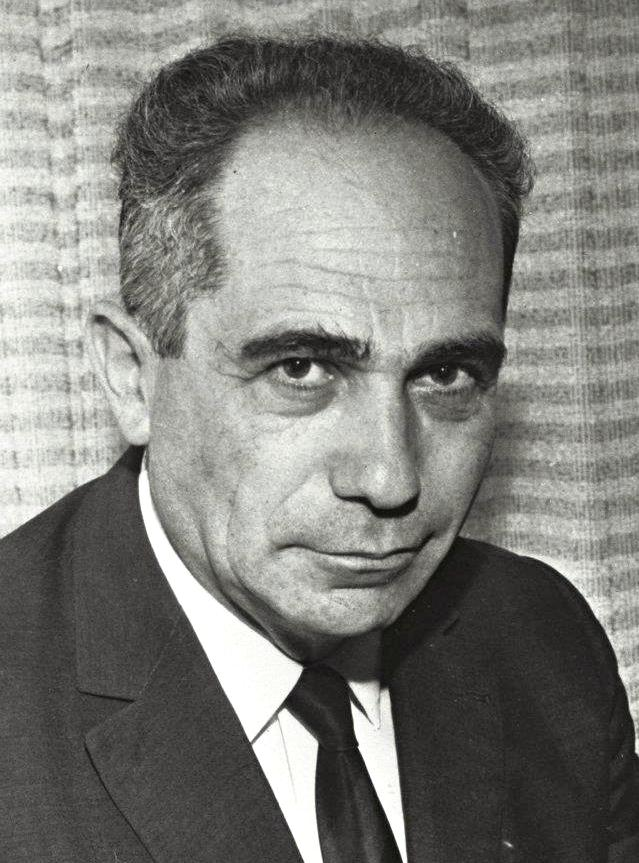

Faction represented in the Knesset
- 1961–1965: Liberal Party
- 1965–1977: Independent Liberals

Personal details
- Born: 8 February 1920 Siret, Romania
- Died: 18 September 1997 (aged 77)

Yehuda Sha'ari (Hebrew: יהודה שערי; 8 February 1920 – 18 September 1997) was an Israeli politician who served as a member of the Knesset for Liberal Party and the Independent Liberals between 1961 and 1977.

== Biography ==
Born in Siret in Romania, Sha'ari was a member of HaNoar HaTzioni during his youth, and was a member of its chief directorate between 1939 and 1941. Between 1937 and 1940 he was also a member of the Zionist Executive. He studied at Chernivtsi University, before emigrating to Mandatory Palestine in 1941. He continued his studied at the School of Law and Economics in Tel Aviv, where he was certified as a lawyer, and later gained an MA in political science from Tel Aviv University.

Between 1941 and 1942 Sha'ari was a member of Givat HaMa'apalim and Nitzanim. He founded the HaMa'avak pioneer group, and in 1948 was amongst the founders of Alonei Abba. In 1945 he returned to Romania as an emissary of HaNoar HaTzioni and the Jewish Agency, before moving to western Europe in 1947 to work as a HaNoar HaTzioni emissary. He returned to Israel in 1948.

== Political career ==
From 1951 until 1961 Sha'ari was a member of the Histadrut's Organising Committee, and between 1957 and 1961 headed its Pensions and Legal departments. He was also chairman of the Operations and Executive committees of HaOved HaTzioni.

A member of the Progressive Party, Sha'ari was elected to the Knesset on the Liberal Party list (a merger of the Progressive Party and the General Zionists) in 1961. Shortly before the 1965 elections Sha'ari and several other Progressive Party members left the Liberal Party to establish the Independent Liberals, with Sha'ari becoming head of its Economic Committee. He was re-elected on the new party's list in the elections, and on 17 January 1966 was appointed Deputy Minister of Development. He was re-elected in 1969, and was appointed Deputy Minister of Tourism. He retained his seat again in the 1973 elections, but lost it in 1977, when the party was reduced to a single seat.

== Business career ==
Sha'ari also served as chairman of the board of directors at the Israel Electric Corporation and the Development and Tourism Company. In 1992 he published a book, The Path of Social Liberalism. He died in 1997 at the age of 77.
