= Ze'ev Sherf =

Israeli politician (1904–1984)

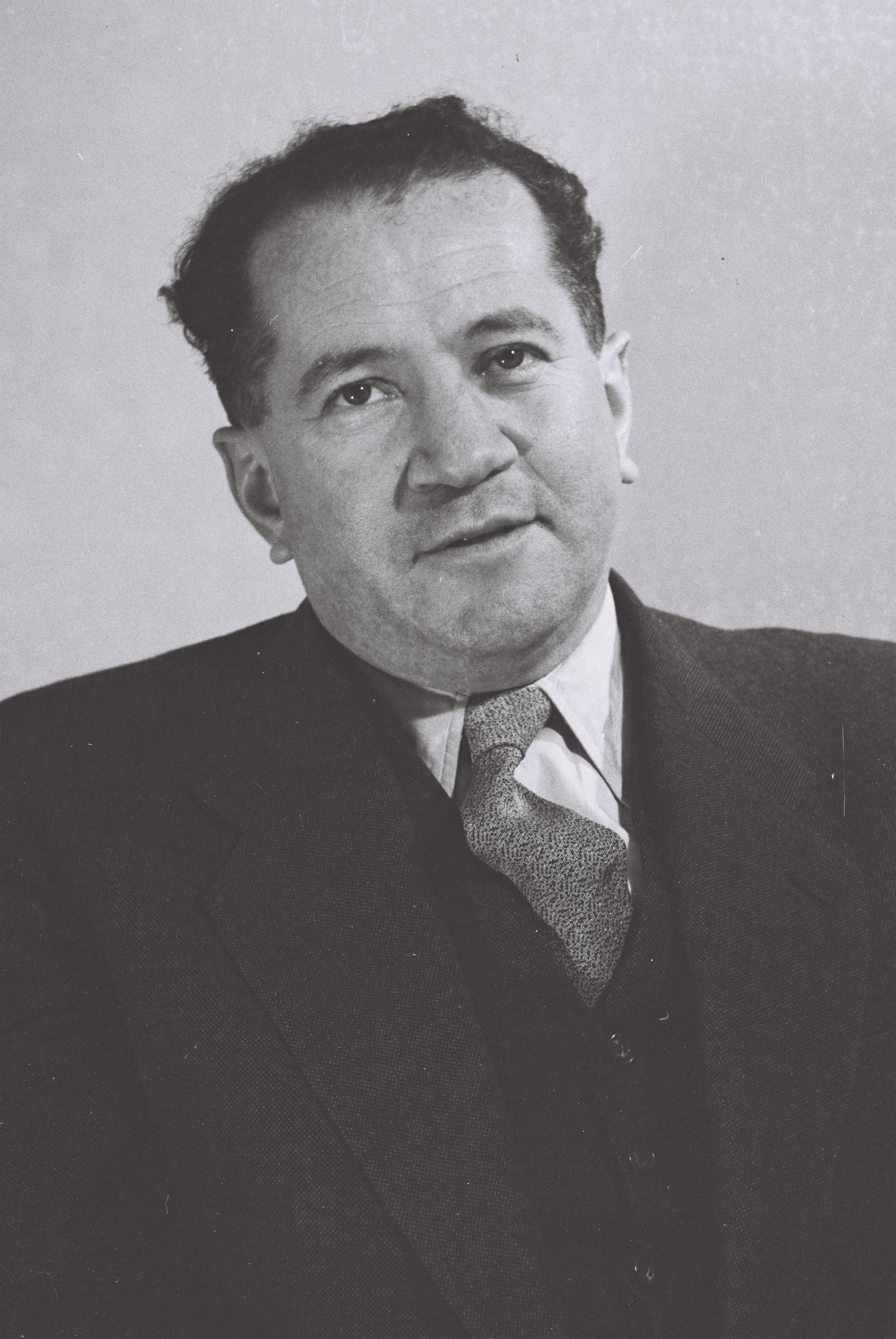
- Sherf in 1948

Ministerial roles
- 1966–1969: Minister of Trade and Industry
- 1968–1969: Minister of Finance
- 1969–1974: Minister of Housing

Faction represented in the Knesset
- 1965–1968: Alignment
- 1968–1969: Labor Party
- 1969–1974: Alignment

Personal details
- Born: 21 April 1904 Czernowitz, Austria-Hungary
- Died: 18 April 1984 (aged 79)

Ze'ev Sherf (Hebrew: זאב שרף; 21 April 1904 – 18 April 1984) was an Israeli politician who held several ministerial portfolios in the 1960s and 1970s.

== Biography ==
Born in Czernowitz in Austria-Hungary (today Chernivtsi, Ukraine), Sherf emigrated to Mandatory Palestine in 1925. He was a member of Poale Zion's youth movement, and was a founder of the "Socialist Youth" movement. During World War II he was a member of the Haganah command, and following the war worked for the Jewish Agency for Israel for two years. In 1947 he was appointed secretary of the Situation Committee, which helped create the administrative apparatus of the new state. Following independence, he served as secretary of the government until 1957.

In the 1965 elections he was voted into the Knesset on the Alignment list. In November 1966 he was appointed Minister of Trade and Industry, and in August 1968 also became Minister of Finance. He held both posts until after the 1969 elections, when he became Minister of Housing. He was not re-elected in the 1973 elections and lost his place in the cabinet the following year when Golda Meir resigned as Prime Minister.

== Books ==
- Law and Administration in the State, 1953
- Three Days, 1959
