= Haim Gvati =

Israeli politician (1901–1990)

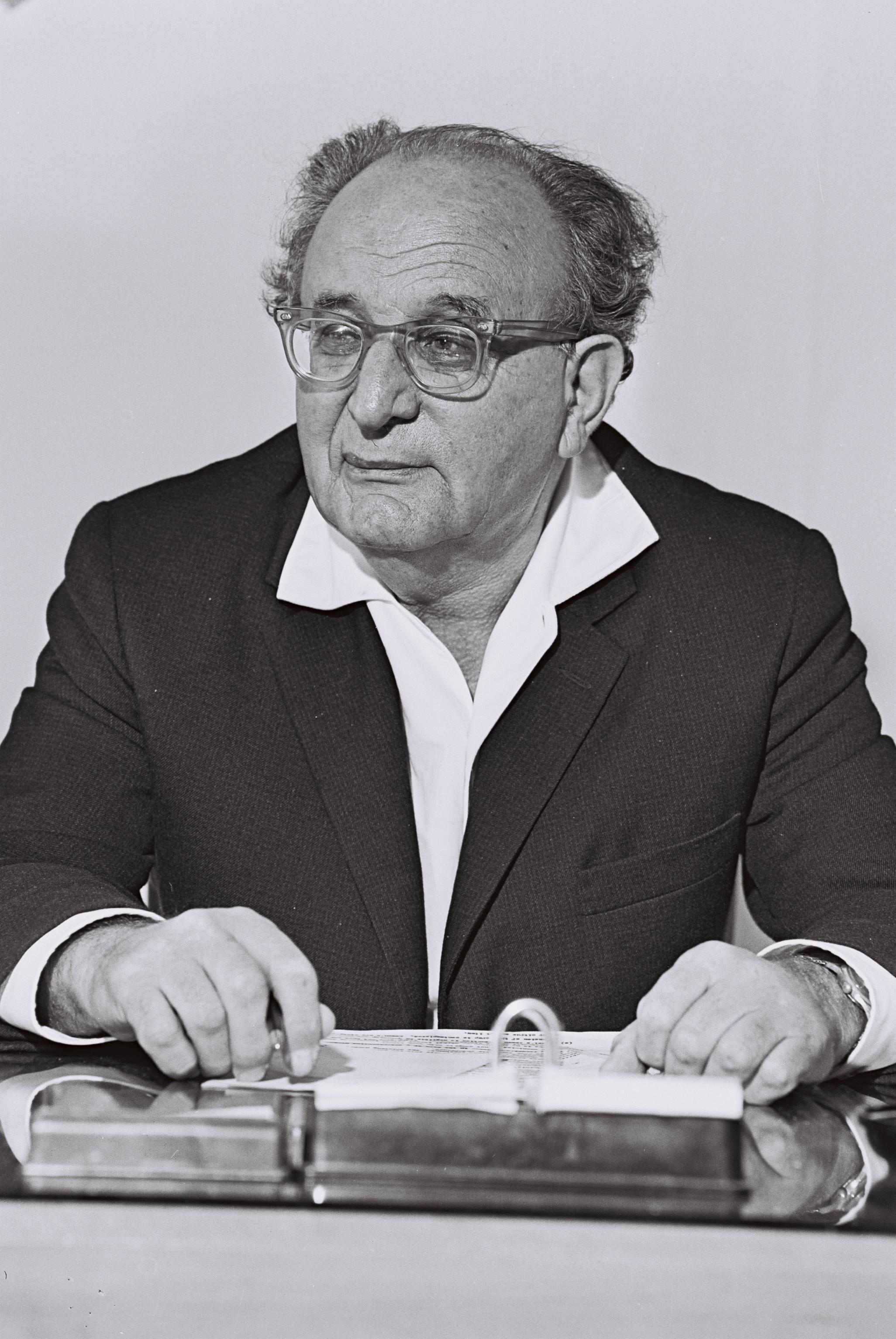
- Gvati in 1964

Ministerial roles
- 1964–1974: Minister of Agriculture
- 1969–1970: Minister of Health
- 1970–1974: Minister of Development

Faction represented in the Knesset
- 1965–1968: Alignment
- 1968–1969: Labor Party
- 1969–1974: Alignment

Personal details
- Born: 29 January 1901 Pinsk, Russian Empire
- Died: 19 October 1990 (aged 89)

Haim Gvati (Hebrew: חיים גבתי; 29 January 1901 – 19 October 1990) was a Zionist activist and Israeli politician. He held several ministerial portfolios and served as Minister of Agriculture between 1964 and 1974.

== Biography ==
Born in Pinsk in the Russian Empire (today in Belarus), Gvati was a member of the Children of Renewal Zionist organisation in his youth. In 1920 he was teaching in a Jewish school in Sevastopol, but later moved to Vilnius (then in Poland) where he was a member of HeHalutz and Tzeiri Zion.

He emigrated to Mandatory Palestine in 1924, and was one of the founders of kibbutz Gvat in 1926, serving as its secretary for several years. He was also a member of the secretariat of HaKibbutz HaMeuhad. Following the split in the kibbutz movement, he moved to Yifat. Between 1945 and 1949 he was a member of HaMerkaz HaHakla'i. In 1950 he was appointed director general of the Agriculture Ministry, serving until 1958. He was also on the board of Mekorot, the national water company.

Despite not being a member of the Knesset, in 1964 he was appointed Minister of Agriculture by Levi Eshkol. He was elected to the Knesset on the Alignment's list in the 1965 elections and retained his ministerial post, even after he resigned his Knesset seat in January 1966. Despite resigning his seat, he was re-elected in 1969 and continued to serve as Minister of Agriculture. Between December 1969 and July 1970 he also served as Minister of Health, and from 1970 until March 1974 served as Minister of Development.

Although he was not re-elected to the Knesset in the 1973 elections, he continued to serve as Minister of Agriculture until Golda Meir resigned; he was not included in Yitzhak Rabin's new government.

== Awards ==
In 1982 Gvati was awarded the Israel Prize, for his special contribution to society and the State, in work and industry.

== See also ==
- List of Israel Prize recipients
