= Zvi Dinstein =

Israeli politician (1926–2012)

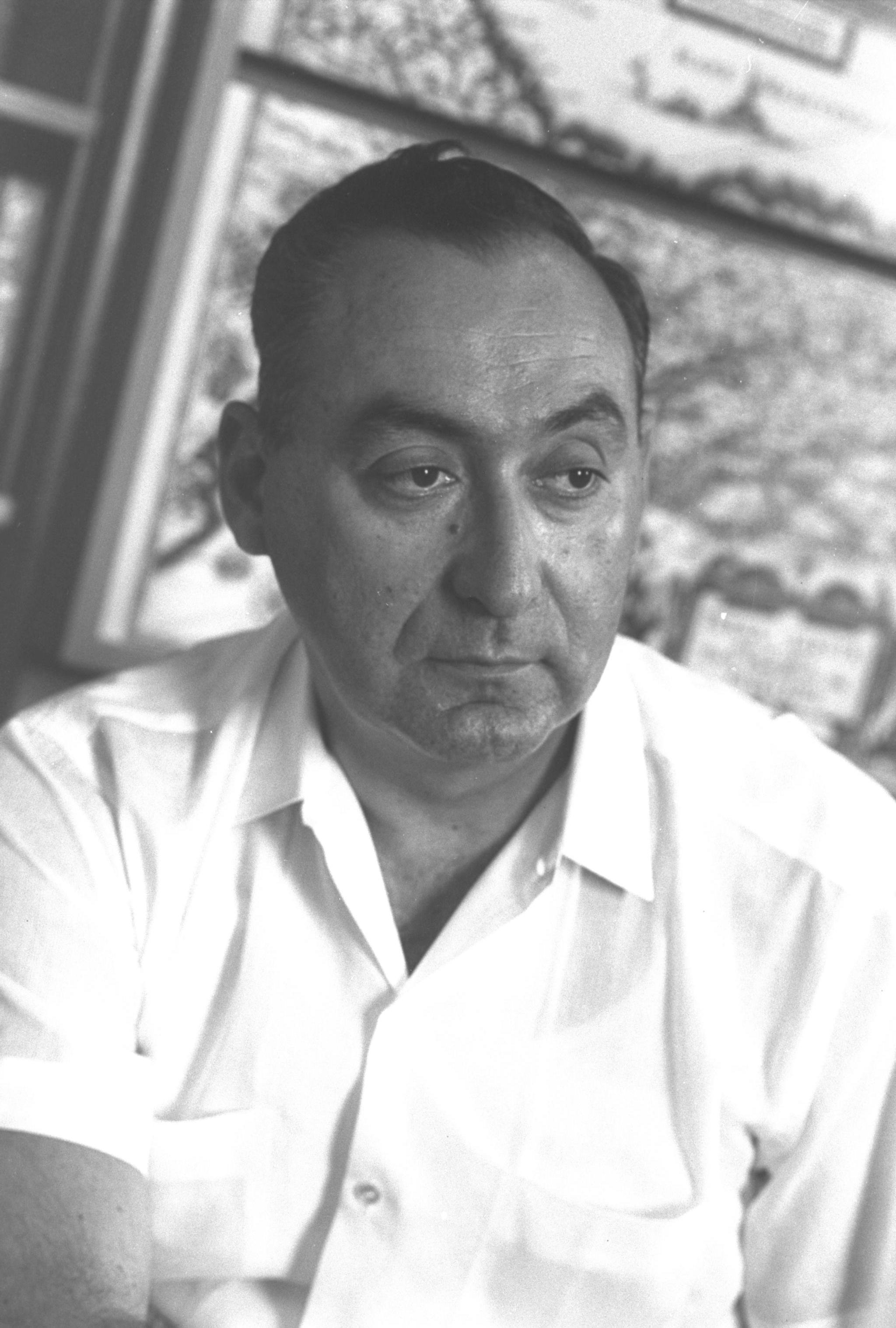
- Dinstein in 1965

Faction represented in the Knesset
- 1965–1968: Alignment
- 1968–1969: Labor Party
- 1969–1974: Alignment

Personal details
- Born: 24 July 1926 Tel Aviv, Mandatory Palestine
- Died: 10 April 2012 (aged 85)

Zvi Dinstein (Hebrew: צבי דינשטיין; 24 July 1926 – 10 April 2012) was an Israeli civil servant and politician who served as a member of the Knesset for the Alignment and Labor Party between 1965 and 1974.

== Biography ==
Zvi Dinstein was born in Tel Aviv in 1926 during the Mandate era, He attended the Commercial High School and served as a police officer in the Jewish Settlement Police in Kfar Giladi. He studied at the Hebrew University of Jerusalem and in 1947 moved to study law at the University of Geneva, where he earned a PhD. Between 1948 and 1952 he worked with immigration and arms procurement in Europe, and was head of the Ministry of Defense delegation to the continent. Between 1952 and 1954 he served as deputy director of the Development Authority, before working as director of the Foreign Assistance and Foreign Currency departments of the Ministry of Finance until 1956. In 1960 he became chairman and president of the Israeli Petroleum and Energy Institute, remaining in post until 1989. From 1962 until 1964 he was director of the Investment Authority.

In 1965 he was elected to the Knesset on the Alignment list, and on 6 December 1966 was appointed Deputy Minister of Defense. He lost the post on 5 June the following year, but on 24 July was appointed Deputy Minister of Finance. He was re-elected in 1969 and remained Deputy Finance Minister until losing his seat in the 1973 elections.

From 1972 until 1977 he chaired the board of directors of the Development and Industrial Bank, before becoming an economic attaché to North America, a post he held until 1979. In 1980 he became chairman of the Balfour Centre for Energy Research, and in 1990 became chairman of the Vita-Yizhar company. He has also been a member of the board of directors at the Weizmann Institute, Tel Aviv University and the Hebrew University.
