= Thirty-third government of Israel =

2013–15 government led by Benjamin Netanyahu

Third Netanyahu cabinet
- 33rd Cabinet of Israel

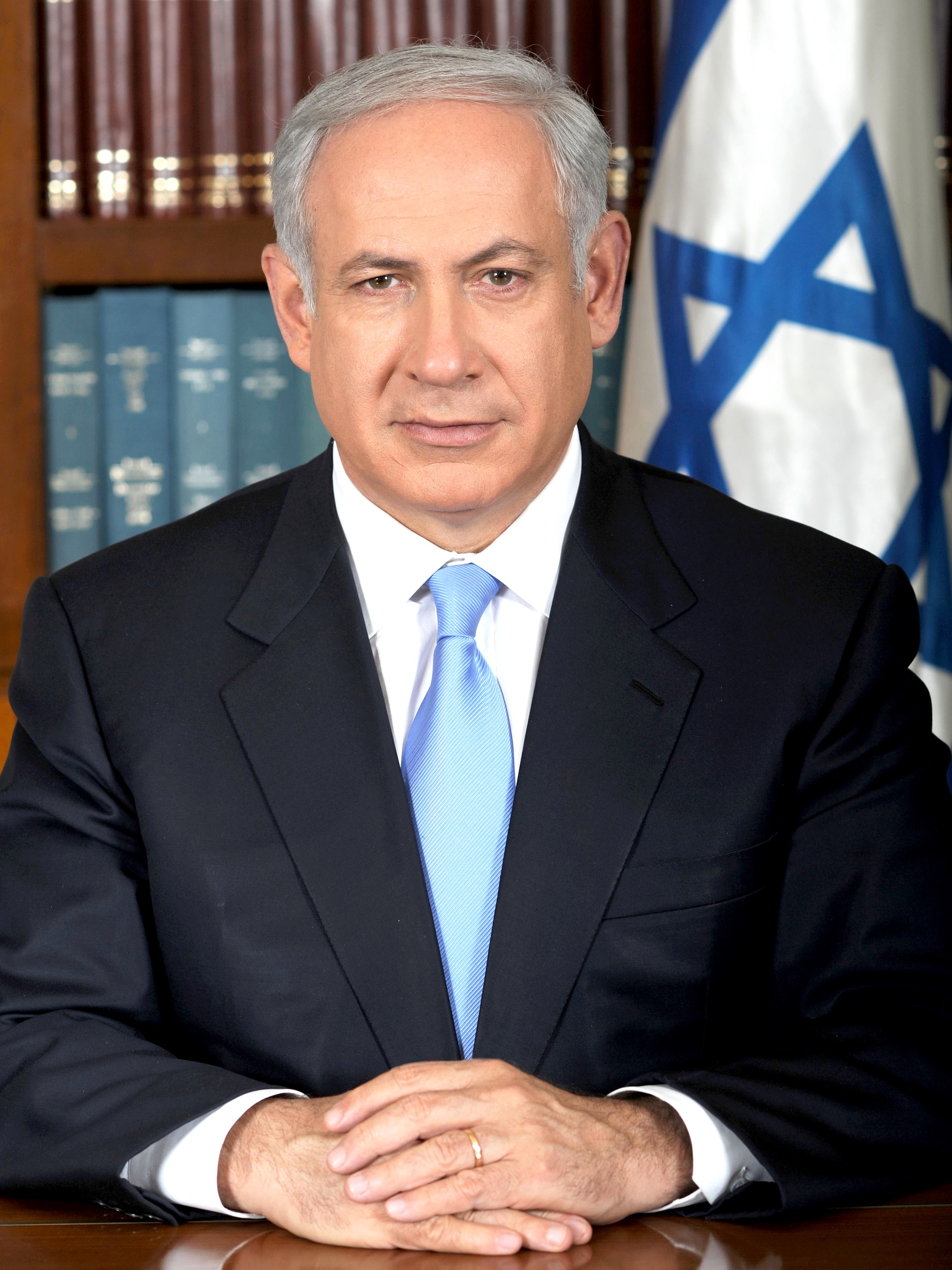
- Date formed: 18 March 2013
- Date dissolved: 14 May 2015

People and organisations
- Head of state: Shimon Peres (until 24 July 2014); Reuven Rivlin (from 24 July 2014)
- Head of government: Benjamin Netanyahu
- Member parties: Likud Yisrael Beiteinu; Yesh Atid; The Jewish Home; Hatnua
- Status in legislature: Coalition government
- Opposition party: Labor
- Opposition leader: Isaac Herzog

History
- Election: 2013 election
- Legislature term: 19th Knesset
- Predecessor: 32nd
- Successor: 34th

The thirty-third government of Israel, also known as the Third Netanyahu Government, was formed after the 2013 election when it took office on 18 March 2013 and served until 14 May 2015. The Prime Minister was Benjamin Netanyahu of Likud with a coalition consisting of Likud Yisrael Beiteinu, Yesh Atid, the Jewish Home, and Hatnua.

== Formation ==
After the election, Likud Yisrael Beiteinu leader Benjamin Netanyahu announced his intention to form "as broad a coalition as possible" and signaled openness to working with Yesh Atid. Conversely, Labor leader Shelly Yachimovich made contacts with several parties with the goal of creating a centre-left bloc without Likud Yisrael Beiteinu. However, Yesh Atid leader Yair Lapid did not reject a coalition with Netanyahu, stating that he would join a government as long as it is committed to the Israeli-Palestinian peace process and supportive of Haredi conscription by reforming the Tal Law.

Several days after the election, reports that Netanyahu's former chief of staff Natan Eshel would be involved in coalition negotiations led to controversy due to Eshel's involvement in a sexual harassment scandal the year before, which resulted in him being banned from public service. Yesh Atid announced that it would not meet with Eshel under any circumstances.

=== Recommendations ===
In consultation meetings with president Shimon Peres, six parties consisting of Likud Yisrael Beiteinu, Yesh Atid, The Jewish Home, Shas, United Torah Judaism and Kadima, representing 82 MKs in total, recommended Netanyahu for government formation. The other 38 MKs in the Knesset did not recommend anyone. On 2 February, Peres formally tasked Netanyahu with government formation.

Party	Party Leader	Seats	Recommended
Likud Yisrael Beiteinu	Benjamin Netanyahu	31	Benjamin Netanyahu
Yesh Atid	Yair Lapid	19	Benjamin Netanyahu
Labor	Shelly Yachimovich	15	No one
The Jewish Home	Naftali Bennett	12	Benjamin Netanyahu
Shas	Eli Yishai	11	Benjamin Netanyahu
UTJ	Yaakov Litzman	7	Benjamin Netanyahu
Hatnua	Tzipi Livni	6	No one
Meretz	Zehava Gal-On	6	No one
Ra'am	Ibrahim Sarsur	4	No one
Hadash	Mohammad Barakeh	4	No one
Balad	Jamal Zahalka	3	No one
Kadima	Shaul Mofaz	2	Benjamin Netanyahu

=== Coalition agreements ===
On 19 February, Netanyahu reached a coalition deal with Hatnua leader Tzipi Livni with Livni as justice minister, where she would be in charge of peace negotiations with Palestinians. This was the first coalition agreement and accounted for 37 seats in the Knesset, leaving 24 short from a parliamentary majority of 61. Following the agreement with Livni, The Jewish Home issued a statement criticizing the coalition agreement announcing that Livni's inclusion made the party less likely to join in coalition.

Also in February, Yesh Atid leader Yair Lapid and The Jewish Home leader Naftali Bennett announced an informal pact known as the Bennett-Lapid alliance, where neither would join in a coalition without the other, which forced Netanyahu to conduct negotiations with the two parties together. On 25 February, Likud announced that it had invited Yesh Atid and The Jewish Home to join the government as it needed the support from both parties for a majority.

This alliance also made it difficult for Netanyahu to negotiate with Haredi parties Shas and United Torah Judaism due to Lapid's support for Haredi conscription and opposition to the parties' inclusion in government, in addition to Lapid's personal animosity with some Haredi leaders. By 5 March, both Haredi parties had reportedly been informed that they would not be joining the government.

On 14 March 2013, the formation of a new government was announced consisting of Likud Yisrael Beiteinu, Yesh Atid, The Jewish Home, and Hatnua, which held a total of 68 seats in the Knesset. This coalition passed a vote of confidence in the Knesset on 18 March, and was sworn in later that day.

== Cabinet members ==
There were 29 ministerial posts to fill, but Yesh Atid leader Yair Lapid called for a smaller cabinet. In response, the coalition agreed the cabinet was to have 20 members, with several members holding multiple ministries, plus eight deputy ministers. However, the cabinet that was sworn in had 22 ministers and eight deputy ministers. This did not include Foreign Minister Avigdor Lieberman, who had resigned in December 2012 after being charged with fraud. PM Netanyahu served as Foreign Minister until November 2013, when Lieberman was acquitted and returned to office.

Portfolio	Minister	Party	Term started	Term ended	Notes
Prime Minister	Benjamin Netanyahu	Likud	18 March 2013	14 May 2015	
Minister of Agriculture and Rural Development	Yair Shamir	Yisrael Beiteinu	18 March 2013	14 May 2015	
Minister of Communications	Gilad Erdan	Likud	18 March 2013	5 November 2014	
Minister of Communications	Benjamin Netanyahu	Likud	5 November 2014	14 May 2015	
Minister of Culture and Sport	Limor Livnat	Likud	18 March 2013	14 May 2015	
Minister of Defense	Moshe Ya'alon	Likud	18 March 2013	14 May 2015	
Minister for the Development of the Negev & Galilee	Silvan Shalom	Likud	18 March 2013	14 May 2015	
Minister of Economy	Naftali Bennett	The Jewish Home	18 March 2013	14 May 2015	Ministry renamed 22 January 2013
Minister of Education	Shai Piron	Yesh Atid	18 March 2013	4 December 2014	(Note: Yesh Atid members of cabinet resigned en masse after PM Netanyahu dismissed Yair Lapid from his position as finance minister.)
Minister of Energy and Water Resources	Silvan Shalom	Likud	18 March 2013	14 May 2015	
Minister of Environmental Protection	Amir Peretz	Hatnuah	18 March 2013	11 November 2014	Resigned after opposing the government's budget plans
Minister of Finance	Yair Lapid	Yesh Atid	18 March 2013	2 December 2014	(Note: Dismissed by prime minister Benjamin Netanyahu)
Minister of Foreign Affairs	Benjamin Netanyahu	Likud	18 March 2013	11 November 2013	Resigned to make way for Lieberman
Minister of Foreign Affairs	Avigdor Lieberman	Yisrael Beiteinu	11 November 2013	6 May 2015	
Minister of Health	Yael German	Yesh Atid	18 March 2013	4 December 2014	
Minister of Home Front Defense	Gilad Erdan	Likud	18 March 2013	30 June 2014	Ministry abolished
Minister of Housing and Construction	Uri Ariel	The Jewish Home	18 March 2013	14 May 2015	
Minister of Immigrant Absorption	Sofa Landver	Yisrael Beiteinu	18 March 2013	10 May 2015	
Minister of Intelligence	Yuval Steinitz	Likud	18 March 2013	14 May 2015	
Minister of International Relations	Yuval Steinitz	Likud	18 March 2013	14 May 2015	
Minister of the Interior	Gideon Sa'ar	Likud	18 March 2013	5 November 2014	Resigned; retired from politics
Minister of the Interior	Gilad Erdan	Likud	5 November 2014	14 May 2015	
Minister of Jerusalem and Diaspora Affairs	Benjamin Netanyahu	Likud	18 March 2013	29 April 2013	
Minister of Jerusalem and Diaspora Affairs	Naftali Bennett	The Jewish Home	29 April 2013	14 May 2015	
Minister of Justice	Tzipi Livni	Hatnuah	18 March 2013	4 December 2014	
Minister of Pensioner Affairs	Uri Orbach	The Jewish Home	18 March 2013	16 February 2015	Died in office
Minister of Pensioner Affairs	Naftali Bennett	The Jewish Home	16 February 2015	14 May 2015	
Minister of Public Security	Yitzhak Aharonovich	Yisrael Beiteinu	18 March 2013	14 May 2015	
Minister for Regional Cooperation	Silvan Shalom	Likud	18 March 2013	14 May 2015	
Minister of Religious Affairs	Naftali Bennett	The Jewish Home	18 March 2013	14 May 2015	
Minister of Science, Technology and Space	Ya'akov Peri	Yesh Atid	18 March 2013	4 December 2014	
Minister of Strategic Affairs	Yuval Steinitz	Likud	18 March 2013	14 May 2015	
Ministry of Transport, National Infrastructure and Road Safety	Israel Katz	Likud	18 March 2013	14 May 2015	
Minister of Tourism	Uzi Landau	Yisrael Beiteinu	18 March 2013	14 May 2015	
Minister of Welfare and Social Services	Meir Cohen	Yesh Atid	18 March 2013	4 December 2014	

=== Deputy Ministers ===
Portfolio	Minister	Party	Term started	Term ended	Notes
Deputy Minister in the Prime Minister's Office	Ofir Akunis	Likud	18 March 2013	14 May 2015	
Deputy Minister of Defense	Danny Danon	Likud	18 March 2013	15 July 2014	
Deputy Minister of Education	Avi Wortzman	The Jewish Home	18 March 2013	31 March 2015	
Deputy Minister of Finance	Mickey Levy	Yesh Atid	18 March 2013	4 December 2014	
Deputy Minister of Foreign Affairs	Ze'ev Elkin	Likud	18 March 2013	12 May 2014	Resigned to become chairman of FADC
Deputy Minister of Foreign Affairs	Tzachi Hanegbi	Likud	2 June 2014	6 May 2015	
Deputy Minister of the Interior	Faina Kirschenbaum	Yisrael Beiteinu	18 March 2013	31 March 2015	
Deputy Minister of Religious Services	Eli Ben-Dahan	The Jewish Home	18 March 2013	14 May 2015	
Deputy Minister of Science and Technology	Tzipi Hotovely	Likud	29 December 2014	14 May 2015	
Deputy Minister of Transport, National; Infrastructure and Road Safety	Tzipi Hotovely	Likud	18 March 2013	14 May 2015	

== Policies ==
=== Religious status quo ===
Following the formation of the new government, Yesh Atid began demanding policies for secularization, including public transportation on the Sabbath, an easier process for conversion to Judaism, and changes to the Chief Rabbinate. The government passed reforms allowing municipal chief rabbis to conduct religious conversions, but did not produce major reforms in secularization.

=== Haredi conscription ===
In July 2013, the government formed a committee led by Ayelet Shaked of Jewish Home to improve equality in burden and facilitate Haredi conscription. In March 2014, the committee proposed a bill for increasing enlistment among those eligible in the Haredi community, leading to widespread protests.

On 12 March 2014, the bill passed the Knesset as an amendment to the Israeli Defense Service Law. Under the new law, the government would establish annual enlistment targets for the Haredim that would increase gradually until 2017. If the targets are met by 2017, then enlistment will remain voluntary. But if they are not met, then conscription will begin for most Haredi students, with the only exemptions being for a total of 1,800 standout students, who would be allowed to continue their yeshiva studies.

=== Settlements in West Bank ===
In 2014, housing minister Uri Ariel of Jewish Home urged the Israeli government to accelerate construction projects in the West Bank, particularly in response to the newly formed 2014 Palestinian unity government, which was viewed as a direct challenge to Israeli interests. Ariel argued that expanding settlements in the area would strengthen Israel’s position and security.

However, this call for expansion sparked significant tension within the coalition government. Finance minister Yair Lapid of Yesh Atid threatened to dissolve the government in case of unilateral actions, such as annexing parts of the West Bank. Lapid expressed concern that such moves could lead to international isolation and economic repercussions, further complicating relations with the United States and with the European Union. Justice Minister Tzipi Livni of Hatnua agreed with this position, warning that annexing parts of the West Bank without negotiations would jeopardize Israel’s democratic and international standing.

In contrast, religious affairs minister Naftali Bennett of Jewish Home argued that annexation of settled areas in the West Bank was the "only sane plan," insisting that the long-standing debate over whether to retain or leave the settlements was counterproductive and that past efforts to reach a resolution on this issue had repeatedly failed. He viewed annexation as a logical step that would provide clarity and strengthen Israel's control over key areas.

=== Electoral reform ===
Part of the coalition deal between the parties were to raise the electoral threshold from 2 to 4 percent. Had this restriction been in place in the 2013 Israeli legislative election, Kadima and the three Arab parties would have all fallen below threshold and not qualify for seats in the Knesset. There have been suggestions that this change was implemented as an attempt to limit Arab representation, but that it could ultimately force the Arab parties to merge and bring greater unity in the long run. On 11 March 2014, a legislative compromise was reached with the threshold increased to 3.25%.

== Dissolution ==
On 2 December 2014, Netanyahu dismissed justice minister Tzipi Livni of Hatnua and finance minister Yair Lapid of Yesh Atid. Four other Yesh Atid ministers then also resigned. This dissolved the government ahead of schedule, resulting in the 2015 election.
