= Bennett–Lapid alliance =

Political alliance between Naftali Bennett and Yair Lapid

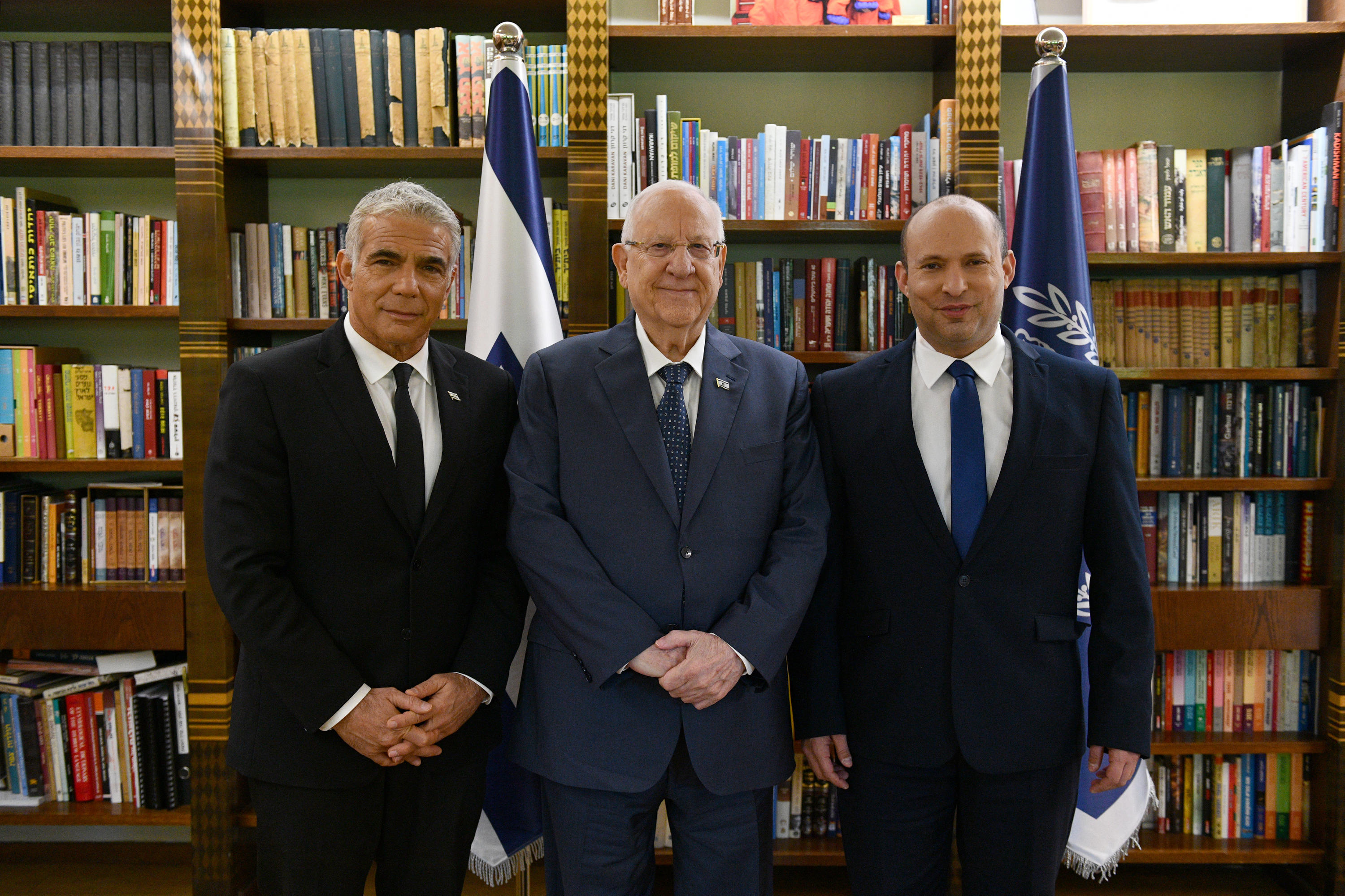
Lapid (left) and Bennett flanking President Reuven Rivlin at the President's Residence on 14 June 2021, the day their government was formed

The Bennett–Lapid alliance, known in the Israeli press as the Brothers' Pact (Hebrew: ברית האחים, Brit HaAchim), is a political alliance between Naftali Bennett and Yair Lapid formed after the 2013 Israeli legislative election. It took both men into the thirty-third government of Israel, where Lapid served as Minister of Finance and Bennett as Minister of Economy. The alliance began to erode during 2013 and was cut short by Lapid's dismissal from the government in late 2014. It was revived in 2021, when Bennett and Lapid formed the thirty-sixth government of Israel and headed it in rotation. In April 2026 the two parties announced that they would run on a joint list named Together. Both of the governments it produced excluded the Haredi parties, and Haredi politicians and media repeatedly portrayed the alliance as directed against Haredi political interests.

== Formation (2013) ==
Naftali Bennett

Yair Lapid

Official Knesset portraits, 5 February 2013

=== Background ===
Before entering politics in 2012, Bennett and Lapid were no more than distant acquaintances, although Bennett had once taken Lapid on a tour of the West Bank. Lapid was a television presenter who had left broadcasting in January 2012, while Bennett, a former chief of staff in Benjamin Netanyahu's office and a former director-general of the Yesha Council, had been elected to lead The Jewish Home. In the January 2013 election their two parties won 31 seats between them—19 for Yesh Atid and 12 for the Jewish Home—about a quarter of the Knesset.

=== Pact and coalition deadlock ===
With 31 seats between them, the two reached an agreement that forced Netanyahu to build a government around their parties. Its two conditions became public in February 2013, during the coalition negotiations: Lapid would not sit in a government with the Haredi parties, and Bennett would not enter a government without Lapid. Netanyahu therefore could not form a coalition with United Torah Judaism and Shas, and both were left out of the government that followed. In early March he said that a "boycott" of a section of the Israeli public was preventing him from completing the coalition and that he was working towards national unity. When he met the Shas leadership he called the situation a "political complication" that made it difficult to bring them in.

Ofer Kenig of the Israel Democracy Institute attributed the difficulty of forming the government primarily to the alliance between Lapid and Bennett. Their combined strength matched that of Likud Yisrael Beiteinu; that, together with the "adamant refusal" of Labor leader Shelly Yachimovich to join the coalition, gave the pair a strong bargaining position. Coalition-building, he noted, did not in the end take significantly longer than in previous years.

According to Yaki Adamker, the alliance grew out of Bennett's soured relations with Netanyahu in the weeks after the election. Netanyahu did not call him, even though Bennett had recommended him to the President; Likud officials refused to speak to him; and the press kept count of the days he went without a call. When Netanyahu approached Lapid, Lapid refused to enter a government without Bennett; when he approached Bennett, the answer was "only with Lapid"—until Netanyahu finally gave in.

Jonathan Lis placed the start of the relationship in 2012, when both men entered politics. In his account they had already worked together during the campaign, each making entry into the government conditional on the other, and Lapid had thereby forced Netanyahu to take in Bennett, whom Netanyahu loathed.

Aides on both sides helped bring them together: Shalom Shlomo, who ran Bennett's ministerial staff, and Hillel Kobrinsky, an associate of Lapid. After the election Shlomo proposed a meeting between his boss and Lapid, and at Bennett's home in Ra'anana the two men asked the aides to work out understandings on economic and social policy and on Haredi conscription. Shlomo and Kobrinsky drew up a memorandum of understanding, and Bennett and Lapid resolved not to enter the government separately. In the government's first months the four met weekly to settle disputes between the parties and coordinate their work.

The press dubbed the relationship the "Brothers' Pact", and the nickname resurfaced when the pair renewed their cooperation in 2021 and again in 2026. Yossi Verter used it in September 2013, describing the relationship as a political and personal alliance with almost no precedent, and writing that they had turned the word "brothers" into a cliché.

=== Contemporary reactions ===
In February 2013 the Los Angeles Times called the pair "a new odd couple in Israeli politics" and said that their pact was what stood between Netanyahu and a new coalition. It described their partnership as a "surprise alliance" between ideological rivals who had "set aside ideological differences on the Palestinian conflict", and noted that the condition was mutual: each party had told Netanyahu that it "will join the government only if the other does as well".

The alliance drew sharp criticism on the right: Vice Prime Minister Moshe Ya'alon of Likud called it a "deception" and a "slap in the face" of Jewish Home voters. Netanyahu, meanwhile, tried to prise them apart with offers of office, a method Kenig described as an attempt to "divide and conquer" by identifying "the weak link, the soft spot for cutting a deal". Netanyahu was reported to have offered Bennett the education portfolio, and senior posts to other Jewish Home members of the Knesset, in return for dropping the alliance with Yesh Atid; Lapid's party was reportedly told it could choose its own portfolios. Bennett said he would not talk about individual appointments before it was clear what the coalition would look like and what it would stand for, and Lapid set three conditions for joining: the conscription of yeshiva students, a resumption of peace talks with the Palestinians and a limit on the size of the cabinet.

Gideon Rahat, a professor at the Hebrew University of Jerusalem, said at the time that the alliance was "something very personal" between two men who were "relatively young, successful and rich", but that further down the two electoral lists it was "hard to see any common denominators among the other members", and that in the end "parties and ideologies will prevail".

=== Formation of the government ===
In the new government Lapid took the finance portfolio and Bennett the industry, trade and employment portfolio, renamed economy and trade—the two departments responsible for the core issues of the 2011 Israeli social justice protests. According to Verter, commentators were split over Netanyahu's motive: some thought the "powerful Brothers' Pact" had backed him into a corner, others that he had in fact wanted to saddle them with responsibility for the country's economic ills.

In June 2013 Lapid described his relations with Bennett as excellent, saying that they met and worked together almost daily and that their friendship allowed responsibilities to pass from one ministry to the other without a fight. He stressed nonetheless that Yesh Atid would fight for its positions even where they conflicted with those of the Jewish Home, and that "we are not twin parties".

== Erosion and rupture (2013–2020) ==
The alliance began to fray as early as late 2013. In November Yedidia Stern identified the wording of the conscription law as a dispute that could "break up the Brothers' Pact and undermine the unity of the coalition": Yesh Atid, led by Ofer Shelah, demanded criminal sanctions for failing to meet conscription targets, while the Jewish Home, led by Ayelet Shaked, preferred economic incentives.

Omri Nahmias described the first week of December 2013 as "the week in which the 'Brothers' Pact' finally collapsed". Bennett was abroad, and in his absence the parties clashed over a bill extending benefits to same-sex couples, brought by Adi Koll, a Yesh Atid member of the Knesset, while Lapid gave a foreign-policy speech that, as Nahmias put it, invited Bennett—"even if in fine words"—to leave the coalition. Nahmias attributed the move to Yesh Atid's collapse in the opinion polls, from 19 seats to about ten, compared with 13 for Meretz and 19 for Labor, and to a judgement that the partnership with Bennett was costing Lapid support among centre-left voters. Lapid therefore chose to turn left, Nahmias wrote, "at the price of the final dissolution of the strange alliance" that had somehow held together for almost a year.

During 2014 the two clashed publicly over budget priorities. Lapid, as finance minister, spoke out against the funding of settlements, saying that the money that could have paid for smaller classrooms, better health services and reducing inequality in Israeli society had gone "somewhere between Itamar and Yitzhar". Bennett, who was then promoting a plan to annex Area C, replied that he "would rather deal with bringing prices down than with bringing settlements down", and accused Yesh Atid of "playing a cynical game to gain votes".

On 2 December 2014 Netanyahu dismissed Lapid and Tzipi Livni from the government, saying in a speech that he "will not tolerate an opposition within the government" and claiming that they had plotted to replace him. The remaining Yesh Atid ministers resigned, and the Knesset voted to hold an early election.

They did not renew the alliance after the March 2015 election: Yesh Atid stayed in opposition, while Bennett joined Netanyahu's fourth government alongside the Haredi parties. During the successive elections of the political crisis of 2019–2021 Bennett and Lapid were in opposing camps, and in the campaign for the 24th Knesset Bennett pledged repeatedly—on the campaign trail, in interviews and in campaign videos—that he would not allow Lapid to serve as prime minister, "not even in rotation". In the same years he assured the Haredi media that cooperation with Lapid "will not happen again".

== Renewal and dissolution (2021–2022) ==
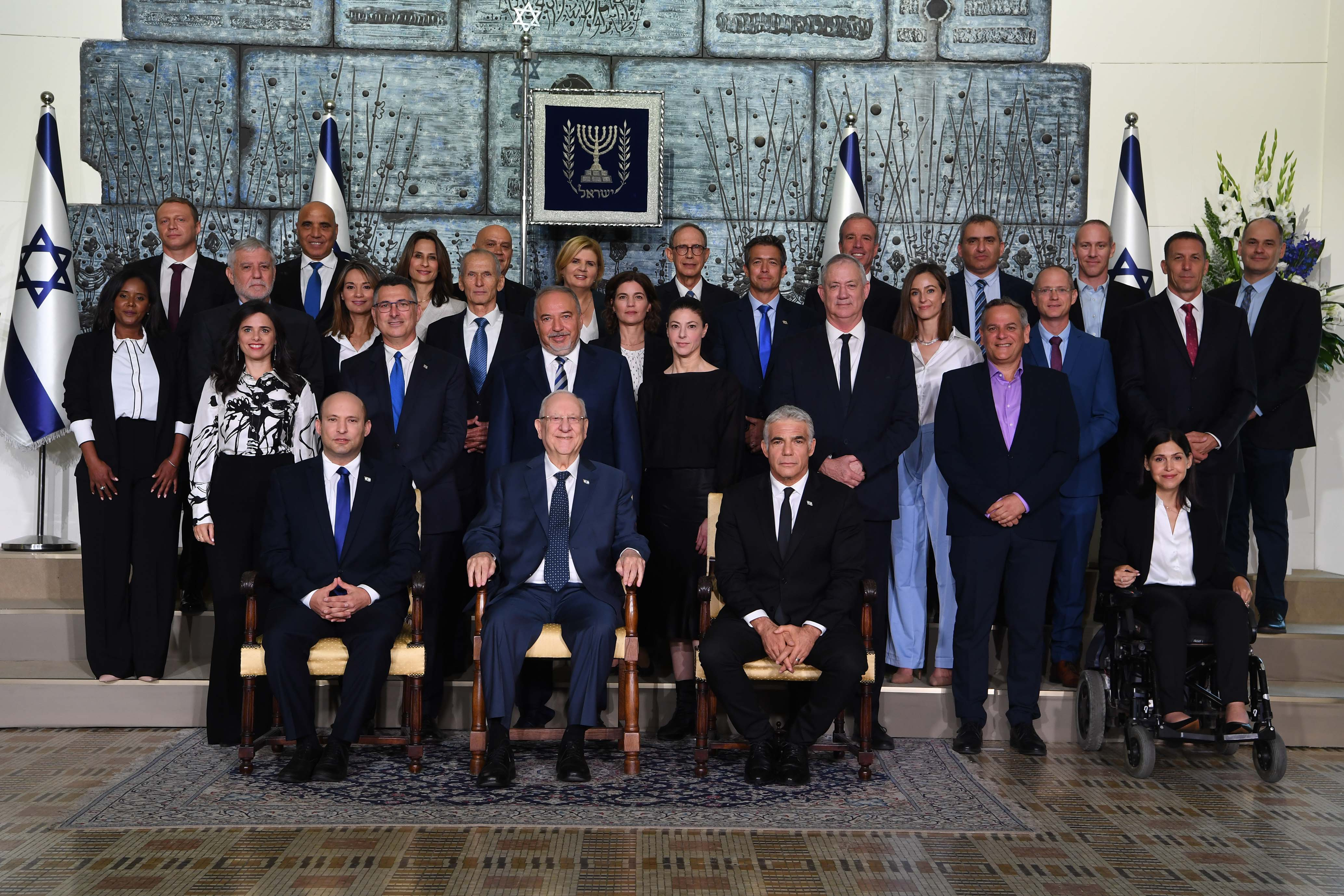
The official photograph of the thirty-sixth government at the President's Residence, 14 June 2021. Bennett and Lapid are seated in the front row on either side of President Rivlin

After four inconclusive elections, Bennett and Lapid formed the Thirty-sixth government of Israel in June 2021, known as the "government of change", under a rotation agreement by which Bennett would serve first as prime minister and Lapid would take over halfway through the term.

The coalition agreements were structured around the two men. Bennett's party, Yamina, signed only one such agreement—with Yesh Atid—while the six other coalition parties, Blue and White, New Hope, Yisrael Beiteinu, Labor, Meretz and the United Arab List, signed with Lapid; adding any further faction required the consent of both men. The government was divided into two blocs, each built around one of them: Bennett's, made up of Yamina and New Hope, and Lapid's, made up of the remaining coalition parties. The serving prime minister and the alternate prime minister held a mutual veto over what could be brought before the full cabinet and its ministerial committees; voting power there was split evenly between the two blocs; each prime minister held ministerial responsibility for the ministers of his own bloc; and the twelve seats on the security cabinet were likewise split six and six.

The parity did not reflect the relative size of the blocs: Bennett's was much the smaller of the two, consisting of just two factions, Yamina and New Hope, which held 13 seats between them. Shirit Avitan Cohen wrote that the split was set "without an advantage for the larger left-wing bloc or for the right-wing bloc led by Prime Minister Bennett", and that, contrary to what Bennett had announced, the right-wing bloc received no veto of its own: the mutual veto belonged to the two prime ministers alone.

The bloc division governed ministerial appointments. The leader of the United Arab List, Mansour Abbas, signed a coalition agreement with Lapid and Bennett under which his party received the chairmanship of the Knesset Interior Committee, the chairmanship of a committee on Arab society, and a deputy speakership of the Knesset, along with budgetary and legislative commitments. The party nevertheless chose not to take part in the government at all—not even as a deputy minister—and so had no ministers of its own. It was granted a free vote on LGBTQ issues, and on foreign policy the arrangement rested on an understanding that such questions would not be raised for a set period, backed by a consultation mechanism.

The government lasted about a year. During 2022 two members of the Knesset from Yamina, Bennett's own party, left the coalition, and it lost its majority. On 20 June 2022, after failing to hold the coalition together, Bennett and Lapid announced that they would bring a bill to dissolve the Knesset, and agreed at the same time that the rotation would go ahead "in an orderly manner": Lapid would head the caretaker government until a new one was formed, and Bennett would serve as alternate prime minister and "holder of the Iran portfolio". Ten days later Bennett announced that he would not stand in the coming election and would hand the leadership of Yamina to Shaked; in his farewell speech he acknowledged that he had formed the government "contrary to all his promises" and had drawn harsh criticism from his own voters for doing so. The rotation itself went ahead, and at the handover ceremony Bennett wished Lapid "good luck, my brother" (Hebrew: בהצלחה אחי).

== Joint electoral list (2026) ==
In June 2024, when Bennett was out of the Knesset and Lapid was Leader of the Opposition, the pair hinted that they might run together at the next election. About a month before the announcement Lapid publicly questioned whether he could rely on Bennett: "He is my friend. The Brothers' Pact is a real thing," he said, but added that "you are not sure, I am not sure and he is not sure either that he will not take the seats and form a government with Netanyahu".

In April 2026, ahead of the 2026 Israeli legislative election, they announced that their parties—Bennett 2026 and Yesh Atid—would run on a joint list named Together, headed by Bennett. Gadi Eisenkot, leader of Yashar, was told of the move before it was announced but did not join it.

Lis noted that Lapid had now stood aside for someone else for the third time: in 2019 when Blue and White was formed, in 2021 under the rotation agreement that gave Bennett the first turn as prime minister, and now in placing Bennett at the head of the joint list. After the government of change collapsed, neither man had criticised the other in public.

Michael Shemesh, then a correspondent for Kan News, argued that the difference this time was timing: on the two previous occasions they had come together only after the election, whereas now they announced it in advance and sought the same voters. In doing so, he wrote, they also narrowed the ideological distance between them, with Bennett giving up part of the right-wing electorate he had previously claimed to represent.

Three polls published the day after the announcement gave the joint list 24 to 26 seats, but in none of them did the Jewish parties opposed to Netanyahu win a majority without the Arab parties. After the announcement, Uri Wertman argued that the 2013 election itself had shown that merging parties does not guarantee success at the ballot box: the merger of Likud with Yisrael Beiteinu produced 31 seats for the joint list, some 11 fewer than the two parties had held after the 2009 election.

== Alliance and the Haredi parties ==
On both occasions the alliance kept the Haredi parties out of the coalition it formed. Haredi politicians and media repeatedly portrayed the alliance as directed against Haredi political interests. According to Adamker, Shas and United Torah Judaism were the main losers from the 2013 government: the Haredi press cast Lapid and Bennett as "enemies" and called the government a "Shmad government" (Hebrew: ממשלת שמד, a polemical term for religious persecution), pointing to the conscription law, cuts to yeshiva budgets and child allowances, and the demand for a core curriculum in Haredi schools.

In February 2013 Eli Yishai, one of the leaders of Shas, said that Lapid and Bennett were trying to push the Haredim to the margins, and called their alliance "a roadside bomb that will explode at some point in an attempt to bring down the prime minister".

During the coalition negotiations Moshe Gafni accused Bennett of "hatred of brothers and the boycotting of brothers" and said that the Jewish Home had declared war on the world of Torah. The Jewish Home denied ruling out a coalition with the Haredi parties, but insisted that it would not enter a government without Yesh Atid.

In October 2021, after the thirty-sixth government passed the state budget, the Haredi website Kikar HaShabbat compared what it called the "brothers' decrees" of 2013 with the measures of the 2021 government, and concluded that "the decrees against the world of Torah and the attempt to push the Haredim aside" were nothing new.

== See also ==
- Together (Israel)
- Thirty-sixth government of Israel
