= Esterina Tartman =

Israeli politician (1957–2026)

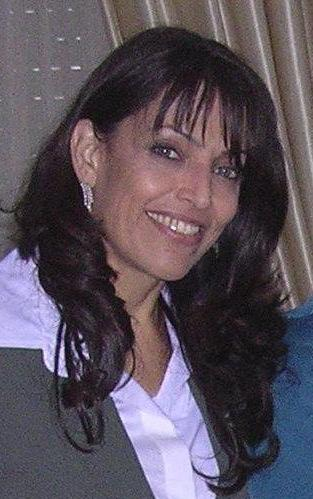
- Tartman in 2006

Faction represented in the Knesset
- 2006–2009: Yisrael Beiteinu

Personal details
- Born: 9 November 1957 Jerusalem, Israel
- Died: 16 September 2026 (aged 68)

Esterina Tartman (Hebrew: אסתרינה טרטמן; 9 November 1957 – 16 September 2026) was an Israeli politician. She served as a member of the Knesset for Yisrael Beiteinu between 2006 and 2009.

== Early life and career ==
Tartman was born in Jerusalem on 9 November 1957. She served in the Israel Defense Forces, being discharged as a major.

== Political career ==
Tartman entered the Knesset in February 2006, two months before the end of the 16th Knesset's term after Yisrael Beiteinu had split from the National Union and gained another seat. She retained her seat in the 2006 elections.

From the start of the 17th Knesset's term, Tartman made a number of controversial acts. In October 2006 she stated that she would introduce a bill to remove Knesset Members who were deemed to be anti-Israeli, though she later backed down and did not submit the bill after a request from Knesset speaker Dalia Itzik.

In January 2007 Tartman submitted a bill to the Knesset that would curb the authority of the Supreme Court to overturn government legislation. Later in the month, Tartman hit the headlines after saying Labor's nomination of Raleb Majadele, a Muslim Arab, for a ministerial position was a "lethal blow to Zionism". Majadele's ministerial position was eventually confirmed by a cabinet vote, though Yisrael Beiteinu leader Avigdor Lieberman abstained from voting.

Despite her controversial remarks, in February 2007, Lieberman nominated her to take the position of Tourism Minister which had been vacated by Isaac Herzog during a cabinet reshuffle caused by Yisrael Beiteinu's addition to Ehud Olmert's coalition. In response, Israeli Arab MK Ahmad Tibi stated the move was "a lethal blow to sanity and tolerance". Since her nomination, she has said she would propose revoking the citizenship of Israeli Arabs and ultra-Orthodox Jews who refused to sign a declaration of their loyalty to Israel. Further controversy followed when the major newspaper Yedioth Ahronoth revealed that she does not hold a Master's degree despite claiming so in her CV and in television interviews. Despite Lieberman insisting she was still the party's only candidate, after much media pressure, Tartman announced that she was withdrawing her candidacy for the post, with Yitzhak Aharonovich announced as her replacement.

Prior to her political career, Tartman won a claim in the High Court that she was "52% disabled" and that she could only work four hours a day due to a car accident she had been involved in during the mid–1990s, though the limitation only applied for one year. She was also awarded 2.5 million shekels. The claim detailed that she had memory, concentration and attention problems. When beginning her political career she stated that the "Knesset is easy work - inconsistent and consisting mostly of talk".

She lost her seat in the 2009 elections.

== Personal life and death ==
Tartman had four children. She died on 16 September 2026, at the age of 68.
