= Likud Yisrael Beiteinu =

Likud Yisrael Beiteinu הליכוד ישראל ביתנו
- Chairman: Benjamin Netanyahu
- Founded: 25 October 2012
- Dissolved: 7 July 2014
- Merger of: Likud; Yisrael Beiteinu
- Ideology: Revisionist Zionism; Secularism; Economic liberalism Conservatism (Israeli); Russian-speakers' interests
- Political position: Right-wing
- Knesset: 31 / 120

Election symbol
- מחל

Website
- www.halikud-beytenu.org.il

Likud Yisrael Beiteinu (Hebrew: הליכוד ישראל ביתנו), often referred by the Israeli media as Likud Beiteinu, was an electoral alliance formed in 2012 by the Likud and the Yisrael Beiteinu to contest the January 2013 Knesset elections.

== History ==
On 25 October 2012, several days after the decision to dissolve the 18th Knesset, and after the decision was made to hold general elections, Prime Minister Benjamin Netanyahu and Minister of Foreign Affairs Avigdor Lieberman convened a joint press conference in which they announced for the first time that their respective parties had established an electoral alliance in preparations for the 19th Knesset elections to be held in January 2013. Four days later, the Likud's Central Committee approved the decision.

According to Lieberman, the decision was made two months before it was announced.

Initially the move encountered opposition from a number of prominent Likud members, led by Michael Eitan, who referred to the move as "the Likud's destruction", nevertheless, after the approval of the move by the Likud's Central Committee he stated that he accepted the decision of the committee. After performing poorly in a Likud primary election and being placed in an unrealistic spot on the party's election list Eitan failed to win re-election to the Knesset.

Of the 31 seats won by Likud Beiteinu joint list, 20 were members of Likud and 11 of Yisrael Beiteinu.

The electoral alliance was unpopular among both Likud and Yisrael Beiteinu. In November 2013, it was reported that both parties would be holding discussions on whether to end their partnership. According to Haaretz, "the alliance stoked anger among senior Likud politicians, both because of the historic change and the high price the party ostensibly paid...." Efforts by Yisrael Beiteinu to formally merge with Likud after the election were rebuffed by Likud activists who worried about the effect an influx of organized new power centers could have on their own influence in the ruling party.

The alliance was officially dissolved on 7 July 2014.

== Knesset members ==
Knesset term	Seats	Faction	Members
19th (2013–2014)	20	Likud	Benjamin Netanyahu, Gideon Sa'ar, Gilad Erdan, Silvan Shalom, Israel Katz, Danny Danon, Reuven Rivlin, Moshe Ya'alon, Ze'ev Elkin, Tzipi Hotovely, Yariv Levin, Yuli Edelstein, Haim Katz, Miri Regev, Moshe Feiglin, Yuval Steinitz, Tzachi Hanegbi, Limor Livnat, Ofir Akunis, Gila Gamliel
19th (2013–2014)	11	Yisrael Beiteinu	Avigdor Lieberman, Yair Shamir, Uzi Landau, Sofa Landver, Yitzhak Aharonovich, Orly Levy, Faina Kirschenbaum, David Rotem, Robert Ilatov, Hamad Amar, Shimon Ohayon

== Election results ==
Election	Leader	Votes	%	Seats	+/–	Status
2013	Benjamin Netanyahu	885,054	23.34	31 / 120	▼11	Coalition
