= Twelfth government of Israel =

1964–66 government led by Levi Eshkol

Second Eshkol Cabinet
- 12th Cabinet of Israel

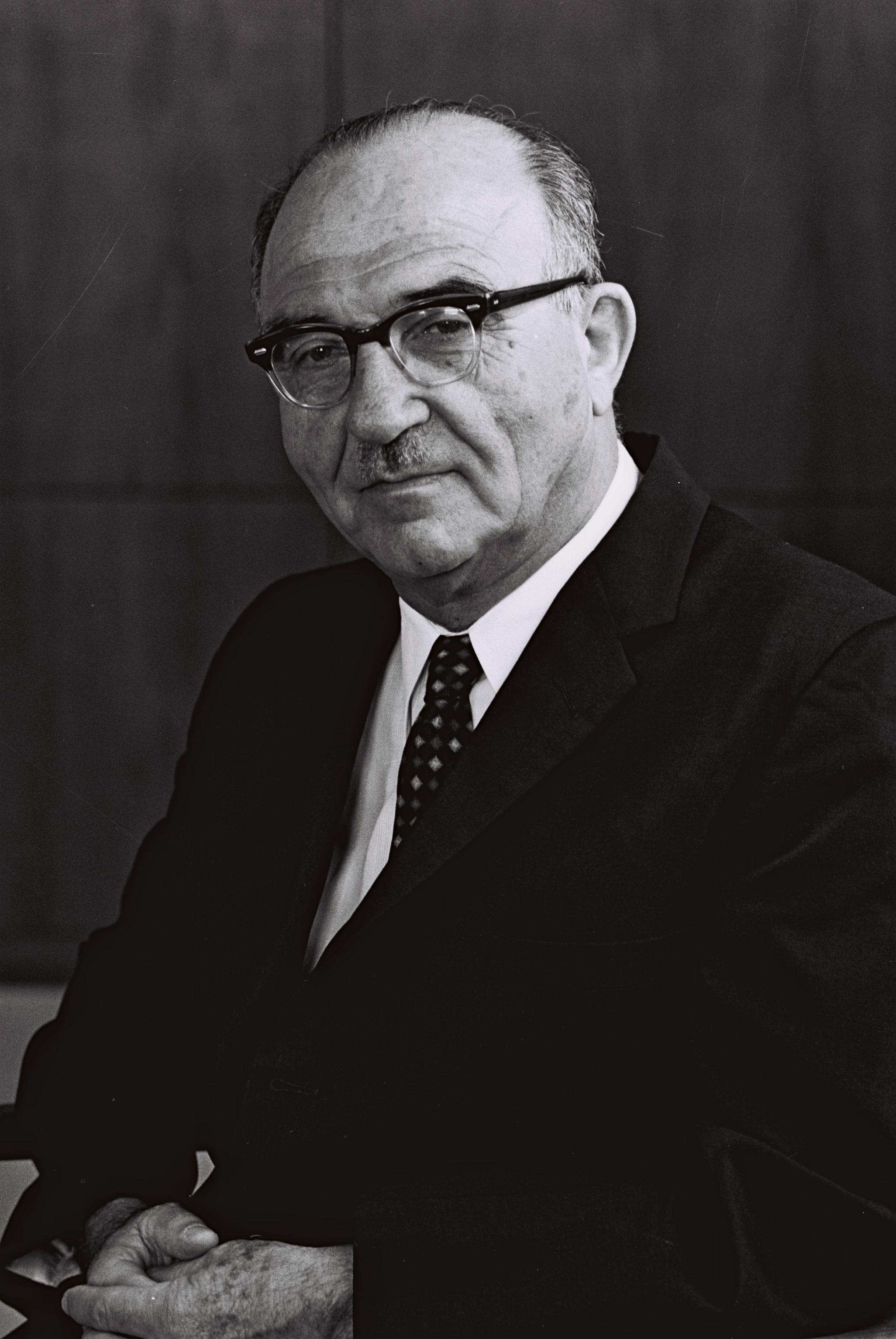
- Date formed: 22 December 1964
- Date dissolved: 12 January 1966

People and organisations
- Head of state: Zalman Shazar
- Head of government: Levi Eshkol
- Member parties: Mapai; National Religious Party; Ahdut HaAvoda; Poalei Agudat Yisrael; Cooperation and Brotherhood; Progress and Development
- Status in legislature: Coalition
- Opposition leader: Menachem Begin

History
- Legislature term: 5th
- Predecessor: 11th Cabinet of Israel
- Successor: 13th Cabinet of Israel

The twelfth government of Israel was formed by Levi Eshkol on 22 December 1964, towards the end of the fifth Knesset.

Eshkol kept the same coalition partners as previously, i.e. Mapai, the National Religious Party, Ahdut HaAvoda, Poalei Agudat Yisrael, Cooperation and Brotherhood and Progress and Development. The only change to the cabinet was Akiva Govrin becoming the country's first Minister of Tourism, having been a Minister without Portfolio in the previous government.

Yosef Almogi and Shimon Peres resigned from the cabinet in May 1965 due to their opposition of the alliance between Mapai and Ahdut HaAvoda. Both joined Ben-Gurion's new party, Rafi in July.

The government served until 12 January 1966, when the thirteenth government took power following the November 1965 elections.

Israeli government formation, 1964
- 22 December 1964
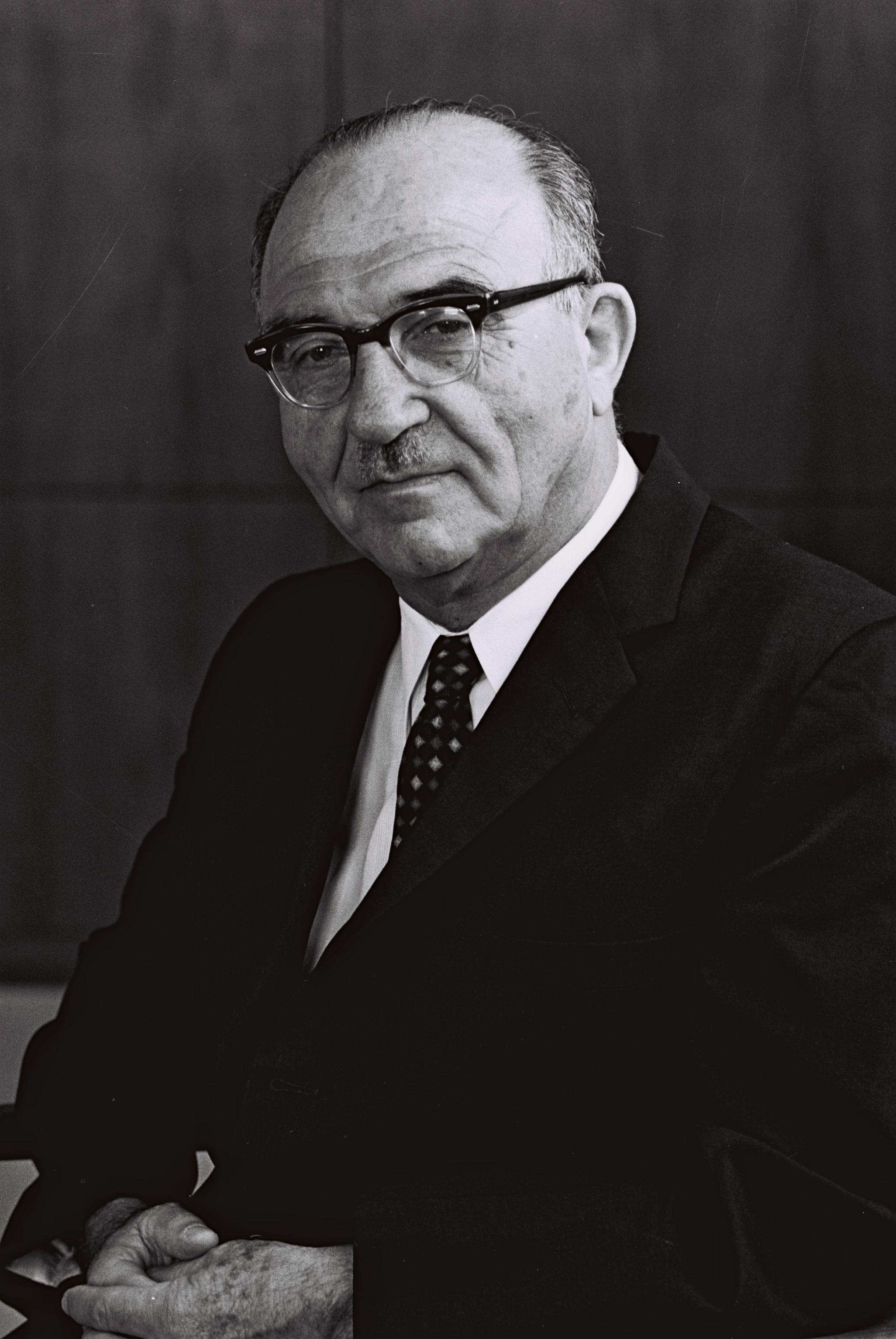

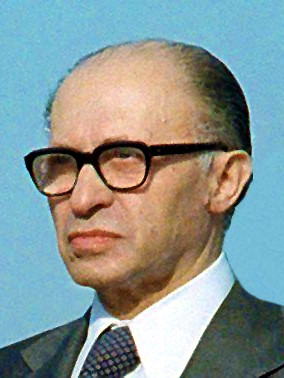
Nominee	Levi Eshkol	Menachem Begin
Party	Mapai	Herut
Electoral vote	68	52
Percentage	56.7%	43.3%
Prime Minister before election
Levi Eshkol
Mapai
Elected Prime Minister
Levi Eshkol
Mapai

== Cabinet members ==
Twelfth government of Israel
Portfolio	Minister	Party
Prime Minister; Minister of Defense	Levi Eshkol	Mapai
Deputy Prime Minister	Abba Eban	Mapai
Minister of Agriculture	Haim Gvati	Not an MK ^{1}
Minister of Development	Yosef Almogi (22 December 1964 – 25 May 1965)	Mapai
Minister of Development	Haim Yosef Zadok (25 May 1965 – 12 January 1966)	Mapai
Minister of Education and Culture	Zalman Aran	Mapai
Minister of Finance	Pinchas Sapir	Mapai
Minister of Foreign Affairs	Golda Meir	Mapai
Minister of Health; Minister of Internal Affairs	Haim-Moshe Shapira	National Religious Party
Minister of Housing	Yosef Almogi (22 December 1964 – 25 May 1965)	Mapai
Minister of Housing	Levi Eshkol (31 May 1965 – 12 January 1966)	Mapai
Minister of Justice	Dov Yosef	Not an MK ^{2}
Minister of Labour	Yigal Allon	Mapai
Minister of Police	Bechor-Shalom Sheetrit	Mapai
Minister of Postal Services	Eliyahu Sasson	Not an MK ^{3}
Minister of Religions	Zerach Warhaftig	National Religious Party
Minister of Tourism	Akiva Govrin	Mapai
Minister of Trade and Industry	Pinchas Sapir (22 December 1964 – 25 May 1965)	Mapai
Minister of Trade and Industry	Haim Yosef Zadok (25 May 1965 – 12 January 1966)	Mapai
Minister of Transportation	Yisrael Bar-Yehuda (22 December 1964 – 4 May 1965) ^{4}	Ahdut HaAvoda
Minister of Transportation	Moshe Carmel (31 May 1965 – 12 January 1966)	Ahdut HaAvoda
Minister of Welfare	Yosef Burg	National Religious Party
Deputy Minister of Defense	Shimon Peres (22 December 1964 – 25 May 1965)	Mapai
Deputy Minister of Education and Culture	Kalman Kahana (23 December 1964 – 12 January 1966)	Poalei Agudat Yisrael
Deputy Minister of Education and Culture	Aharon Yadlin (23 December 1964 – 22 November 1965)	Mapai
Deputy Minister of Health	Yitzhak Rafael (23 December 1964 – 22 March 1965)	National Religious Party
Deputy Minister of Health	Shlomo-Yisrael Ben-Meir (from 24 March 1965 – 12 January 1966)	National Religious Party
Deputy Minister of Internal Affairs	Shlomo-Yisrael Ben-Meir	National Religious Party

^{1} Although Gvati was not an MK at the time, he later entered the Knesset as a member of the Labour Alignment, an alliance of Mapai and Ahdut HaAvoda.

^{2} Although Yosef was not an MK at the time, he was a member of Mapai.

^{3} Although Sasson was not an MK at the time, he was elected to the next Knesset as a member of the Labour Alignment, an alliance of Mapai and Ahdut HaAvoda.

^{4} Died in office.
