= Ministry of Tourism (Israel) =

Government ministry of Israel

- משרד התיירות

Agency overview
- Formed: 22 December 1964
- Jurisdiction: Government of Israel
- Minister responsible: Haim Katz
- Website: Official website

The Ministry of Tourism (Hebrew: מִשְׂרַד הַתַּיָּרוּת, romanized: Misrad HaTayarut) is the Israeli government office responsible for tourism. The office was created in 1964, with Akiva Govrin being the first minister, but was appended to the Trade and Industry Ministry between 1977 and 1981. The logo for the Ministry depicts the Biblical Spies carrying fruit back from touring the Holy Land.

== List of ministers ==
The Minister of Tourism (Hebrew: שָׁר הַתַּיָּרוּת, Sar HaTayarut) is the political head of the ministry and a member of the Israeli cabinet. Ehud Barak is the only Prime Minister to have held the position while serving as the Prime Minister. Moshe Katsav, Minister of Tourism from 1996 to 1999, served as President from 2000 to 2007. On one occasion there was a Deputy Minister of Tourism.

#	Minister	Party	Government	Term start	Term end	Notes
1	Akiva Govrin	Mapai; Alignment	12	22 December 1964	12 January 1966	
2	Moshe Kol	Independent Liberals	13, 14, 15, 16, 17	12 January 1966	20 June 1977	Resigned from the Knesset when appointed Minister in line with party policy
3	Gideon Patt	Likud	19	5 August 1981	11 August 1981	
4	Avraham Sharir	Likud	19, 20, 21, 22	11 August 1981	22 December 1988	
–	Gideon Patt	Likud	23, 24	22 December 1988	13 July 1992	
5	Uzi Baram	Labor Party	25, 26	13 July 1992	18 June 1996	
6	Moshe Katsav	Likud	27	18 June 1996	6 July 1999	
7	Ehud Barak	One Israel	28	6 July 1999	5 August 1999	Serving Prime Minister
8	Amnon Lipkin-Shahak	Centre Party	28	5 August 1999	7 March 2001	
9	Rehavam Ze'evi	National Union	29	7 March 2001	17 October 2001	Assassinated while in office
10	Binyamin Elon	National Union	29	31 October 2001	14 March 2002	
11	Yitzhak Levy	National Religious Party	29	18 September 2002	28 February 2003	
–	Binyamin Elon	National Union	30	28 February 2003	6 June 2004	Sacked after the National Union refused to support the disengagement plan. In an ultimately unsuccessful attempt to prevent him from being fired before a cabinet vote on the plan by avoiding receiving notification of his sacking, Elon went into hiding.
12	Gideon Ezra	Likud	30	4 July 2004	10 January 2005	Initially appointed Acting Minister of Tourism, with the position made permanent 31 August 2004
13	Avraham Hirschson	Kadima	30	10 January 2005	4 May 2006	
14	Isaac Herzog	Labor Party	31	4 May 2006	21 March 2007	
15	Yitzhak Aharonovich	Yisrael Beiteinu	31	21 March 2007	16 January 2008	
16	Ruhama Avraham	Kadima	31	14 July 2008	31 March 2009	
17	Stas Misezhnikov	Yisrael Beiteinu	32	31 March 2009	18 March 2013	
18	Uzi Landau	Yisrael Beiteinu	33	18 March 2013	14 May 2015	
19	Yariv Levin	Likud	34	14 May 2015	17 May 2020	
20	Asaf Zamir	Blue and White	35	17 May 2020	2 October 2020	
21	Orit Farkash-Hacohen	Blue and White	35	14 October 2020	13 June 2021	
22	Yoel Razvozov	Yesh Atid	36	13 June 2021	29 December 2022	
23	Haim Katz	Likud	37	29 December 2022		

=== Deputy Ministers ===
#	Minister	Party	Government	Term start	Term end
1	Yehuda Sha'ari	Independent Liberals	15	22 December 1969	10 March 1974

== See also ==
- Tourism in Israel
