= Raleb Majadele =

Israeli Arab politician

- غالب مجادلة
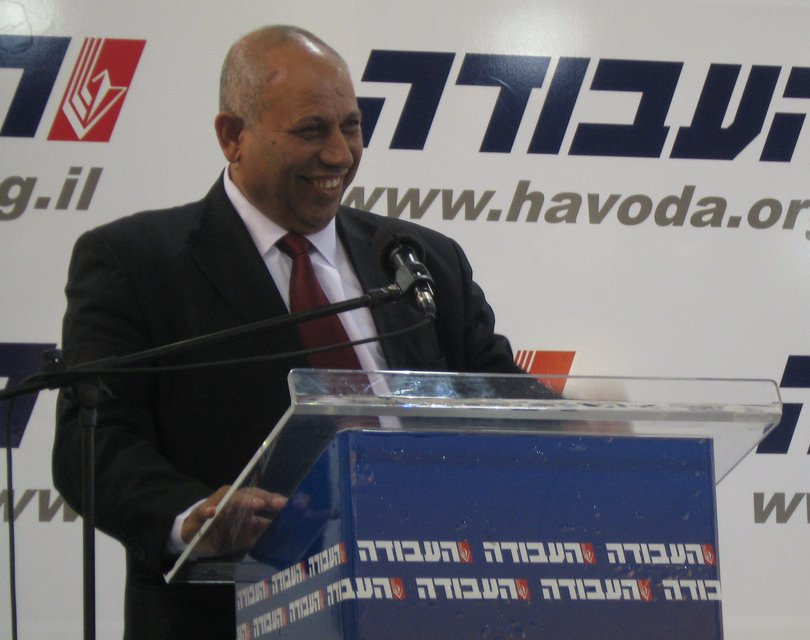

Ministerial roles
- 2007: Minister without Portfolio
- 2007–2009: Minister of Science, Culture & Sport

Faction represented in the Knesset
- 2004–2009: Labor Party
- 2010–2013: Labor Party
- 2014–2015: Labor Party

Personal details
- Born: 5 April 1953 (age 73) Baqa al-Gharbiyye, Israel

Raleb Majadele (Arabic: غالب مجادلة, Levantine Arabic: [ˈɣaːleb maˈʒaːdele]; Hebrew: ראלב מג'אדלה, [ˈʁaleb maˈd͡ʒadele]; also spelt Ghaleb Majadele, born 5 April 1953) is an Israeli Arab politician. He served as a member of the Knesset for the Labor Party in three spells between 2004 and 2015, and became the country's first Muslim minister when appointed Minister without Portfolio on 28 January 2007. Between March 2007 - March 2009 he served as Minister of Science, Culture and Sport, the first Muslim minister in Israeli history.

== Biography ==
Born in Baqa al-Gharbiyye, as a teenager Majadele was a member of the HaNoar HaOved VeHaLomed youth movement, becoming its secretary.

A businessman, he became secretary of the Regional Workers Council, and headed the Education and Sport department of the Histadrut trade union.

He joined the Labor Party, and was placed twentieth on the party's list for the 2003 Knesset elections. Although the party won only 19 seats, Majadele entered the Knesset on 28 June 2004 as a replacement for Avraham Burg, who had resigned from the Knesset and public life and become a businessman. Majadele was re-elected in the 2006 elections.

On 10 January 2007, Labor leader Amir Peretz announced that Majadele would be appointed Minister of Science, Culture and Sport. On 28 January 2007 the cabinet voted to appoint him Minister without Portfolio. He sparked controversy when he publicly refused to sing Hatikvah, the Israel national anthem, stating that it was written for Jews only. He went on to point out that although he does not participate in singing Hatikvah, he does express respect for the song by standing up when it is sung, and that he does not deny that Israel is a Jewish state. His appointment was confirmed by a vote in which all ministers except the chairman of Yisrael Beiteinu, Avigdor Lieberman, voted in favour. In March 2007 Majadele received the Science, Culture and Sport portfolio.

Although welcomed by many, Majadele's appointment was controversial among several groups of politicians. Mohammed Barakeh of Hadash attacked it as a "dirty trick" that would not advance Arabs, while Lieberman and Esterina Tartman of Yisrael Beiteinu claimed it was damaging to Zionism. The latter criticism was itself extremely controversial, with lawmakers from across the political spectrum branding Lieberman's and Tartman's remarks racist; a number of Labor lawmakers demanded that Yisrael Beiteinu be expelled from the governing coalition as a condition of Labor continuing to participate in the government.

For the 2009 elections he was placed fifteenth on the Labor list, but lost his seat as Labor were reduced to 13 representatives. However, he re-entered the Knesset on 13 April 2010 as a replacement for Yuli Tamir, who had resigned her seat. For the 2013 elections he was placed seventeenth on the party's list, and lost his seat again as the Labor Party won only 15 seats. However, he re-entered the Knesset on 14 December 2014 to serve as a replacement for Binyamin Ben-Eliezer, who resigned for health reasons after Danny Atar (who had been sixteenth on the party list) gave up the opportunity to take his place. He did not contest the 2015 elections, losing his seat.

== See also ==
- List of Arab members of the Knesset
