= Yuli Tamir =

Israeli academic and former politician

- יולי תמיר
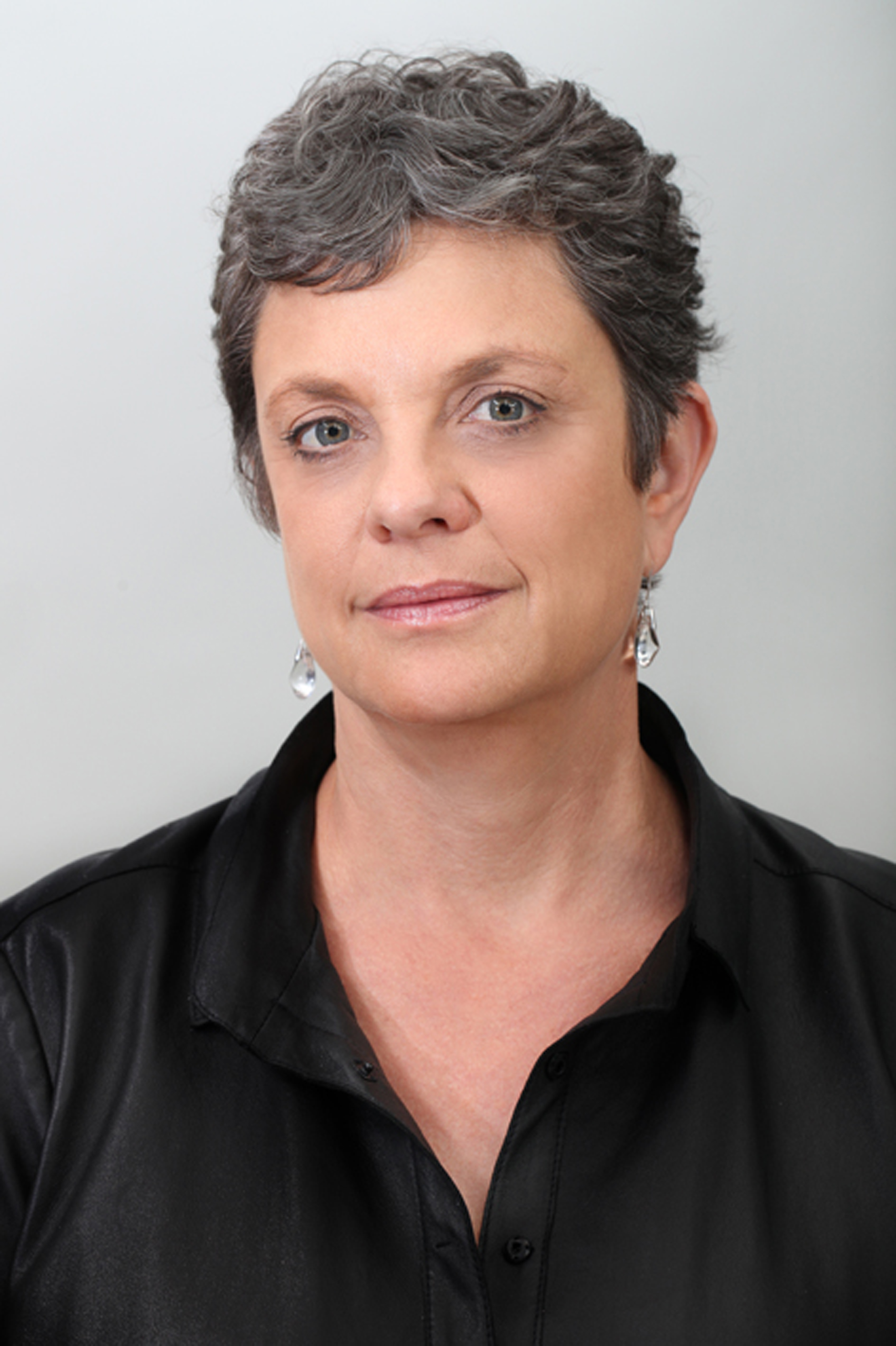

Ministerial roles
- 1999–2001: Minister of Immigrant Absorption
- 2006–2009: Minister of Education
- 2006–2007: Minister of Science, Culture & Sport

Faction represented in the Knesset
- 2003–2010: Labor Party

Personal details
- Born: 26 February 1954 (age 72) Tel Aviv, Israel

Yael "Yuli" Tamir (Hebrew: יולי תמיר; born 26 February 1954) is an Israeli academic and former politician who served as a member of the Knesset for the Labor Party between 2003 and 2010, and as Minister of Immigrant Absorption and Education, as well as the deputy speaker of the Knesset and a member of the Finance committee, the Education committee and the Security and Foreign Affairs committee. From 2010 to 2020, Tamir was President of Shenkar College of Engineering and Design. Since 2015 she is an adjunct professor at the Blavatnik School of Government, Oxford. As of October 2020, Tamir is President of Beit Berl College.

== Biography ==
Born in Tel Aviv (some sources state Ramat Gan), Tamir served in Aman's 848 Unit during her national service, and during the Yom Kippur War, she served as an officer in an outpost on the Sinai. She received a BA in Biology and an MA in political science from the Hebrew University of Jerusalem. She received a PhD in political philosophy from the University of Oxford. Between 1989 and 1999, she was a philosophy lecturer in Tel Aviv University and a research fellow at the Shalom Hartman Institute of Jerusalem, Princeton University and Harvard University.

Tamir was one of the founders of Peace Now in 1978, and between 1980 and 1985, she was an activist for Ratz. From 1998 until 1999, she was chairwoman of the Israeli Association for Civil Rights. From 1995, she became active in the Labour Party. Although Tamir failed to win election to the Knesset in the 1999 election, she was appointed Minister of Immigrant Absorption by Ehud Barak. She was elected to the Knesset in the following 2003 election, and served on the finance, constitutional, law and order, public input, and culture and sport committees. She also served on the investigatory parliamentary committee into government corruption.

She was elected to the Knesset again in the 2006 elections and served as the Education Minister in Ehud Olmert's Kadima-led coalition government from 2006 till 2009. Her tenure was tainted by ubiquitous and lengthy strikes by Teacher's unions in elementary, middle and high schools, and at universities and colleges. Tamir also served as acting Science, Culture and Sport minister following Ophir Pines-Paz's resignation in November 2006 until March 2007 when Raleb Majadele was appointed. Placed ninth on the party's list, she retained her seat in the 2009 elections. However, she resigned her seat in 2010 to become President of Shenkar College of Engineering and Design, and was replaced by Majadele.

Tamir has been a controversial figure in Israel. As Minister of Education, she approved a history textbook for Arab children, wherein the 1948 Arab–Israeli War ("Israel's War of Independence") is described as the nakba – the disaster. This led the opposition leaders to demand her dismissal, while Member of Knesset Ronit Tirosh (Kadima), a former director general of the Education Ministry, said the "wretched" decision "is not justified from a pedagogic standpoint and is not a matter for political intervention." Tamir defended her act as a way of giving "expression to [the Arab's] feelings as well." On 11 August 2008, it was reported that Tamir had announced plans to remove Ze'ev Jabotinsky's work from the national education curriculum, causing a furor among rightists. Tamir denied the report.

== Academic interests ==
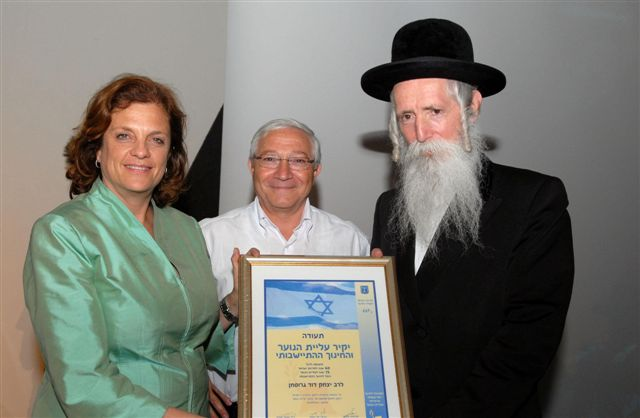
Yuli Tamir presenting award to Rabbi Yitzchak Dovid Grossman, 2008.

Tamir wrote her PhD under the supervision of Isaiah Berlin. Her work concentrated on nationalism. In her first book "liberal nationalism" she established the inherent ideological connection between nationalism and liberalism. As Professor Sandy Levinson writes in his review of the book: "It is a mark of Tamir's achievements that one finishes the book willing to credit the non-oxymoronic nature of the term "liberal-nationalism" and thus accept the possibility that one is not forced to choose among them. In her new book "Why Nationalism" Tamir continues this line of thought and claims that national sentiments lie as the core of the modern nation-state and that their erosion, due to the development of hyper-globalism, is responsible for the rapid growth of social and economic gaps. Tamir suggest that liberals should not surrender the power of nationalism to right wing extremists but rather try to harness it to recreated a cross-class coalition that can promote social solidarity and social justice.

== Selected publications ==
=== Books ===
- Liberal Nationalism (1993), Princeton University Press
- Who's Afraid of Equality? Education and Society in Israel (2015), Yedioth Ahronoth Books (in Hebrew)
- Why Nationalism (2019), Princeton University Press.

=== Journal articles ===
- Tamir, Yael (July 1995). "Two Concepts of Multiculturalism". Journal of Philosophy of Education. 29 (2): 161–172. doi:10.1111/j.1467-9752.1995.tb00350.x.
- Tamir, Yael (1991). "The Right to National Self-Determination". Social Research. 58 (3). The New School: 565–590. JSTOR 40970660.
