= Liberal Nationalism (book) =

Book

- Author: Yael Tamir
- Language: English
- Subject: Nationalism
- Published: 1993 (Princeton University Press)
- Publication place: United States
- Media type: Print paperback)
- Pages: 206
- ISBN: 9780691001746
- OCLC: 34069143

Liberal Nationalism is a 1993 book of political theory by Yael Tamir that presents a liberal argument in support of national particularism. Liberal nationalism presents an argument that nationalism can work under liberal principles.

== Background ==
Liberal Nationalism began as Tamir's doctoral thesis, under the direction of Isaiah Berlin.

Released by Princeton University Press, Liberal Nationalism was the first book by Tamir, an Israeli political scientist and former politician and activist. In the book, the author argued against globalisation, stating that nationalism still had a role to play and that it could complement liberalism.

== See also ==
- Liberalism and nationalism
