= Gideon Patt =

Israeli politician (1933–2020)

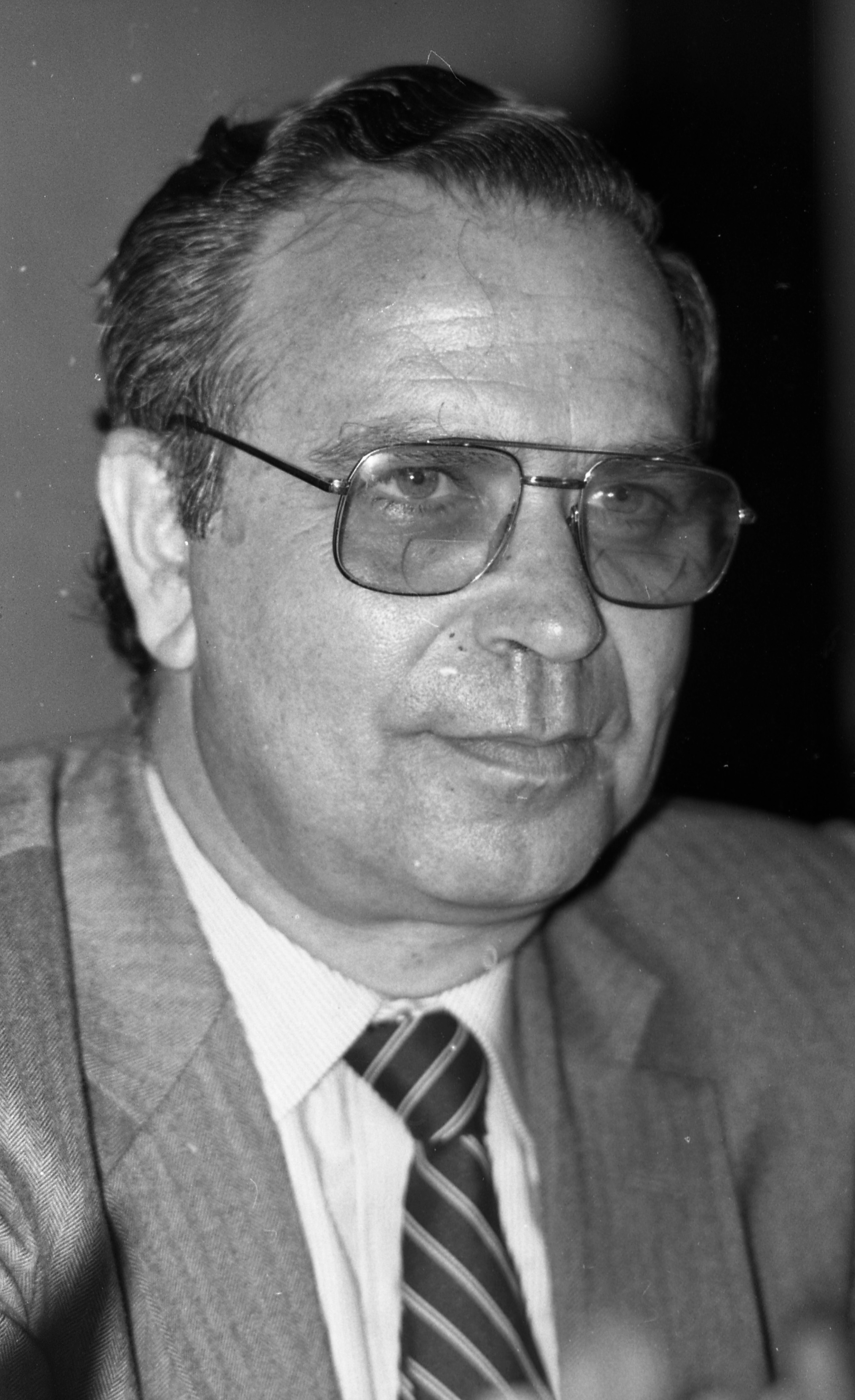
- Patt in 1985

Ministerial roles
- 1977–1979: Minister of Housing & Construction
- 1979–1984: Minister of Industry & Trade
- 1981: Minister of Tourism
- 1984–1988: Minister of Science & Development
- 1988–1992: Minister of Tourism

Faction represented in the Knesset
- 1970–1973: Gahal
- 1973–1996: Likud

Personal details
- Born: 22 February 1933; Jerusalem, Mandatory Palestine
- Died: 26 April 2020 (aged 87)

Gideon Patt (Hebrew: גדעון פת; 22 February 1933 – 26 April 2020) was an Israeli politician who served in several ministerial positions between the late 1970s and early 1990s.

== Biography ==
Born in Jerusalem during the Mandate era, Patt served in the Nahal brigade and studied economics at New York University, gaining a BA.

For the 1969 elections he was placed 27th on the Gahal list, but missed out on a seat when the alliance won only 26 seats. However, he entered the Knesset on 29 January 1970 as a replacement for the deceased Aryeh Ben-Eliezer. He was re-elected in 1973 and 1977 and was appointed Minister of Housing and Construction in Menachem Begin's government. In January 1979 he switched to the Industry, Trade and Tourism portfolio.

Following the 1981 elections the Tourism and Industry and Trade portfolios were separated, though Patt continued to hold both until August 1981 when he gave up the Tourism post.

After the 1984 elections he became Minister of Science and Development, before returning to the Tourism portfolio after the 1988 elections. Although he retained his seat in the 1992 elections, the government was formed by Labor, and Patt lost his place in the cabinet. He did not run for re-election in 1996 and retired from politics.

Patt died on 26 April 2020.
