= Opinion polling for the 2013 Israeli legislative election =

Polls may not add up to 120 seats due to rounding or omitted parties that dropped out or did not poll consistently.

== Polling ==
=== By party ===
Date	Poll	Kadima	Likud	Yisrael Beiteinu	Labor	Shas	UTJ	National Union	Jewish Home	UAL -Ta'al	Hadash	Balad	Meretz	Yesh Atid	Otzma	Am Shalem	Hatnuah
2009 election results		28	27	15	13	11	5	4	3	4	4	3	3	—N/a	—N/a	—N/a	—N/a
Seats in the outgoing Knesset		21	27	15	8	10	5	2	3	4	4	3	3	—N/a	2	1	7
Final results		2	31		15	11	7	12		4	4	3	6	19	0	0	6
2013
22 Jan	Channel 1 exit poll	0	31		17	11	6	12		3	3	2	7	19	2	0	7
22 Jan	Channel 2 exit poll	0	31		17	12	6	12		3	4	2	7	19	0	0	7
22 Jan	Channel 10 exit poll	0	31		17	13	6	12		4	5	2	6	18	0	0	6
18 Jan	Yedioth Ahronot/Dahaf	2	32		17	11	6	12		4	4	3	6	13	2		8
17 Jan	Haaretz/Dialogue	2	32		17	12	5	14		3	5	4	6	12			8
17 Jan	Knesset Channel/Panels Politics	3	34		16	10	6	14		4	4	3	6	11	2		7
17 Jan	Israel Hayom/The New Wave	2	35		17	11	6	15		3	4	3	5	12			7
17 Jan	Maariv/Ma'agar Mochot	3	37		15	12	6	14		3	4	3	7	8	2	1	5
16 Jan	Channel 10/Dialogue	2	32		16	11	6	14		3	4	4	6	11	2		9
16 Jan	Walla!/TNS-Teleseker	3	34		18	10	6	15		4	3	3	5	11		2	6
15 Jan	Channel 2/Dahaf	2	33		17	11	6	12		3	4	3	6	11	2		9
14 Jan	Knesset Channel/Panels Politics	3	35		17	9	5	14		4	3	3	5	11	3		8
12 Jan	Channel1/Midgam	2	33		16	10	5	15		4	4	3	6	10	3		9
11 Jan	Yisrael Post/Sof Hashavua	2	34		17	9	6	14		4	3	3	5	11	3		9
11 Jan	Jerusalem Post/Smith	2	34		18	10	6	14		4	4	3	4	10		3	8
11 Jan	Yediot/Dahaf	2	33		18	10	5	14		4	4	3	6	11	2		8
11 Jan	Yisrael Hayom/New Wave	2	35		17	11	6	14		3	4	4	4	11			9
11 Jan	Maariv/Maagar	3	38		16	12	6	13		3	4	3	5	8	1	1	7
10 Jan	Geocartography		34		16.5	11	6	15		3	4	5	5.5	12			5
10 Jan	Mako & Channel2/Panels	2	33		16	10	6	15		4	3	4	5	10	2	2	8
10 Jan	Reshet Bet/Sarid	2	34		17	9	7	14		3	4	3	4	9	2	1	7
10 Jan	Channel 2/Dahaf	2	33		18	10	5	14		4	4	3	6	11	2		11
9 Jan	News1/Reshet Bet/Machon Sarid	2	34		17	9	7	14		3	4	3	4	9	2		7
8 Jan	Walla/TNS-Teleseker		34		18	11	6	13		4	4	2	4	11		2	11
7 Jan	Channel 10/Dialog	2	35		17	12	6	14		4	3	4	5	11			7
7 Jan	Panels Politics, Mako		32		16	10	6	16		11			5	10	3	2	9
7 Jan	Times of Israel		34		21	10	6	15		12			6	11			5
3 Jan	Jerusalem Post, Globes/Smith	2	32		17	10	5	16		3	4	4	4	10		3	10
3 Jan	Israel Radio/Geocartography		35		18	8	7	18		11			7	5	6		6
2 Jan	Haaretz/Dialog	2	34		16	11	6	14		4	4	4	4	9	2		10
1 Jan	Channel 2/Dahaf		33		17	11	6	13		4	4	3	5	11	2		11
2012
27 Dec	Globes/Rafi Smith		34		18	11	6	14		3	4	4	4	10		2	10
27 Dec	Reshet Bet/Meno Geva		34		16	13	6	15		4	4	3	5	9			11
25 Dec	Dialog	2	35		17	13	6	13		11			4	9			10
21 Dec	Maariv/Maagar		37		20	11	6	12		4	3	3	4	7	2		9
20 Dec	Reshet Bet		36		19	11	6	11		3	4	3	4	11		3	9
18 Dec	Channel 2/Dahaf		35		19	11	6	12		4	4	3	3	9	2	2	10
14 Dec	Yedioth Ahronoth/Dahaf		35		19	11	6	11		4	4	3	4	8	2		11
14 Dec	Maariv/Maagar	1	38		20	12	6	11		10			3	8	1	1	9
14 Dec	Jerusalem Post/Geocartography	0	35		17	10	6	16		4	4	3	6	12	0	0	7
13 Dec	Knesset Channel/Panels	0	36		18	9	6	13		5	4	2	5	7	3	2	9
12 Dec	Jerusalem Post/Smith Research	0	39		19	10	6	10		3	4	4	4	9	0	3	9
11 Dec	Walla/Tns-Teleseker	4	38		17	11	5	9		5	3	3	3	11	0	0	11
10 Dec	Haaretz/Dialog	2	39		17	12	6	11		5	4	3	3	6	0	3	9
6 Dec	Channel 2	2	38		19	13	6	12		3	3	3	2	5	1	3	10
6 Dec	Atzmaut announces withdrawal																
6 Dec	Knesset Channel/Panels	2	36		19	10	5	12		11			5	8	3	3	6
6 Dec	Reshet Bet/Meno Geva	0	36		20	10	6	11		4	3	4	3	9	3	2	9
5 Dec	Channel 10/Dialog	2	37		20	10	6	11		5	3	3	4	7	0	3	9
29 Nov	Yisrael Hayom/New Wave	2	39		20	11	5	10		3	4	3	4	10	0	2	7
29 Nov	Yedioth Ahronoth/Dahaf	0	37		19	11	5	10		4	4	3	5	9	2	2	9
29 Nov	Globes/Smith	0	37		20	11	6	11		3	4	4	5	10		3	6
28 Nov	Haaretz/Dialog	2	39		18	11	6	8		11			5	8	2	3	7
22 Nov	Knesset Channel/Panels	0	33		24	10	6	13		10			6	11	4	3	
18 Nov	Panels	0	38		22	9	5	11		10			5	13	3	4	
18 Nov	Haaretz/Dialogue	3	41		21	12	5	8		5	3	4	4	9		3	
13 Nov	MAKO/Panels	2	36		21	10	5	12		9			5	15		3	
8 Nov	Knesset Channel/Panels	0	36		23	10	5	13		11			5	13		4	
6 Nov	Channel 2/Maagar	3	39		22	14	6	7		10			3	10			
5–6 Nov	Maagar	4	39		22	15	6	7		9			2	10			
4 Nov	Yedioth Ahronoth	0	35		24	13	6	5		11			4	15	2		
28 Oct	Maariv/Teleseker	4	43		20	10	6	8		11			3	15			
28 Oct	Channel 2/Maagar	3	42		23	13	5	5		10			6	9			
28 Oct	Channel 10/Panels	5	35		23	14	6	9		11			4	13			
25 Oct	Likud and Yisrael Beiteinu announce joint list																
18 Oct	Haaretz/Dialog	9	29	13	20	11	6	6		4	4	3	5	11			
17 Oct	Globes	3	25	15	18	13 (Note: If Aryeh Deri leads Shas.)	6	4	5	11 (Note: Hadash polled at 4 seats.)			4	14			
11 Oct	Maariv/Teleseker	6	29	13	17	10	5	2	5	4	3	3	4	17			
10 Oct	Haaretz/Dialog	7	29	15	19	10	6	8		5	4	2	4	11			
28 Sept	Haaretz/Dialog	8	28	14	20	11	7	6		5	4	2	5	8			
1 Aug	Globes	4	27	15	19	9	6	4	5	11			4	13			
31 Jul	Haaretz/Dialog	7	25	15	21	11	6	7		4	4	2	4	12			
26 Jul	Globes	7	28	16	18	9	6	3	4	11			4	11			
20 Jul	Yediot Aharonot/Dahaf	7	25	13	21	10	4	6	4	11			4	13			
17 Jul	Maariv/Maagar	7	27	16	17	9	6	3	3	10			4	11			
17 Jul	Kadima leaves the coalition																
17 May	Knesset Channel/Panels	3	30	12	20	6	5	6	3	3	4	3	6	17			
13 May	Globes/Smith	9	31	13	17	7	5	3	3	10			4	11			
8 May	Maariv/TNS	10	30	12	20	7	6	4	4	11			4	12			
8 May	Haaretz/Dialog	11	33	15	19	8	6	5		10			6	6			
8 May	Kadima joins the coalition																
1 May	Maariv/TNS	11	31	12	18	8	6	4	4	10			5	11			
1 May	Haaretz/Dialog	11	32	14	19	8	6	5		4	4	2	5	10			
30 Apr	Ynet/Dahaf	11	30	13	18	7	6	2	2	11			5	11			
26 Apr	Israel Hayom/New Wave	13	31	14	17	9	5	3	2	10			4	12			
22–23 Apr	JPost/Smith	13	31	15	15	8	6	4	3	11			3	11			
29 Mar	TNS	13	30	13	18	7	6	4	4	10			4	11			
28 Mar	Dahaf	12	29	13	18	8	6	4	2	11			3	12			
28 Mar	Channel 10/Dialog	15	32	14	15	9	5	5					5	9			
27 Mar	Shaul Mofaz wins 2012 Kadima leadership election																
21 Mar	Yedioth Ahronoth	12	29	14	13	8	6	3	3	11			3	14			
9 Mar	Teleseker	14	27	14	14	8	4	4	4	10			5	11			
4–5 Mar	Haaretz/Dialog	12	35	15	14	9	7	5		3	5	2	5	8			
29 Feb	Globes/Smith	15	29	15	14	10	5	4	4	10			3	11			
17 Feb	Geocartography	12	39	13	12	9	5	10		10			4	6			
31 Jan	Benjamin Netanyahu wins 2012 Likud leadership election																
27 Jan	Globes/Smith	13	30	14	15	10	6	5	3	3	4	3	3	11			
18 Jan	Maagar	9	28	17	15	7	6	5	4	11			3	8			
17 Jan	Geocartography	11	33	16	13	8	6	2	3	11			4	13			
10 Jan	New Wave	14	28	14	15	9	5	2	3	10			5	15			
9 Jan	Dahaf	8	28	16	14	6	6	2	4	11			4	14			
9 Jan	Teleseker	15	26	14	17	7	4	8		10			3	12			
9 Jan	Panels	9	29	13	12	8								20			
8 Jan	Maagar	12	27	17	14	7	6	5	4	11			3	7			
8 Jan	Haaretz	10	24	14	15									15			
2011
29 Dec	Globes/Smith	19	31	14	18	11	6	4	3	10			4				
27 Oct	Channel 2/Sarid	17	37	15	22												
26 Sept	Maagar	17	27	17	19	9	6	4	3	9			4	2			
21 Sept	Shelly Yachimovich wins 2011 Israeli Labor Party leadership election																
5 Aug	Maagar	25	29	16	11	13	5	4	3	9			4				
2 May	Globes/Smith	26	29	18	8	11	5	5	4	10			3				
17 Jan	Channel 10/Dialog	27	30	17	6				6								
2009 election results		28	27	15	13	11	5	4	3	4	4	3	3	—N/a	—N/a	—N/a	—N/a
Seats in the outgoing Knesset		21	27	15	8	10	5	2	3	4	4	3	3	—N/a	2	1	7
Date	Poll	Kadima	Likud	Yisrael Beiteinu	Labor	Shas	UTJ	National Union	Jewish Home	UAL -Ta'al	Hadash	Balad	Meretz	Yesh Atid	Otzma	Am Shalem	Hatnuah

Notes

Hypothetical polling

The following table contains polls if Tzipi Livni had been leader of Kadima.

Date	Poll	Kadima	Likud	Yisrael Beiteinu	Labor	Shas	UTJ	National Union	Jewish Home	UAL -Ta'al	Hadash	Balad	Meretz	Yesh Atid	Aryeh Deri
Seats won in 2009		28	27	15	13	11	5	4	3	4	4	3	3		
2012
27 Mar	Shaul Mofaz wins 2012 Kadima leadership election														
21 Mar	Yedioth Ahronoth	15	29	12	13	8	6	3	3	11			4	13	2
9 Mar	Teleseker	16	27	14	14	8	4	4	4	10			5	10	
4–5 Mar	Haaretz/Dialog	10	37	16	14	9	7	5		3	5	2	5	7	
31 Jan	Benjamin Netanyahu wins 2012 Likud leadership election														
18 Jan	Maagar	13	26	17	14	7	6	5	4	11			3	7	3
9 Jan	Dahaf	13	28	15	13	6	6	2	4	11			4	11	5
9 Jan	Teleseker	15	27	14	18	8	5	8		10			3	12	

=== For prime minister ===
Incumbent Prime Minister Benjamin Netanyahu has maintained a healthy plurality lead in every poll to date.

Date	Poll	Netanyahu	Mofaz	Yachimovich	Lieberman	Lapid	Neither/Don't know
2012
28-29 Nov	Yisrael Hayom/New Wave	32.8%	4.6%	11.8%	3.8%	3.8%	22.6%
28-29 Nov	Maariv/Dahaf	62%	-	19%	-	-	19%
28-29 Nov	Maariv/Dahaf	68%	-	-	-	17%	15%
5–6 Nov	Maagar	44%	1%	8%	-	1%	21%
10 Oct	Haaretz/Dialog	57-62%	16%	-	-	-	-
10 Oct	Haaretz/Dialog	57-62%	-	17%	-	-	n/a
23 Sept	Haaretz/Dialog	35%	6%	16%	8%	-	31%
31 Jul	Haaretz/Dialog	29%	5%	16%	14%	7%	28%
17 Jul	Maariv/Maagar	41%	-	7%	-	-	52%
17 Jul	Maariv/Maagar	44%	6%	-	-	-	50%
17 Jul	Maariv/Maagar	37%	-	-	16%	-	47%
17 Jul	Kadima leaves the coalition						
8 May	Kadima joins the coalition						
8 May	New Wave	39.8%	4.5%	11.3%	4.2%	7.2%	28%
1 May	Maariv/TNS	63.5%	16.3%	-	-	-	16.6%
1 May	Maariv/TNS	62.0%	-	22.8%	-	-	12.1%
1 May	Maariv/TNS	70.6%	-	-	9.5%	-	18.1%
26 Apr	New Wave	29.1%	4.6%	9.2%	9.2%	7%	40.9%
28 Mar	Dahaf	54%	16%	-	-	-	30%
27 Mar	Shaul Mofaz wins 2012 Kadima leadership election						
9 Mar	Teleseker	66.4%	10.3%	-	-	-	21.2%
31 Jan	Benjamin Netanyahu wins 2012 Likud leadership election						
9 Jan	Teleseker	60.5%	9.6%	-	-	-	29.9%
9 Jan	Teleseker	57.7%	-	-	-	19.7%	22.6%

Hypothetical polling

The following table contains polls if Tzipi Livni had been leader of Kadima.

Date	Poll	Netanyahu	Livni	Yachimovich	Lieberman	Don't know
2012
28-29 Nov	Maariv/Dahaf	55%	30%	-	-	15%
27 Mar	Shaul Mofaz wins 2012 Kadima leadership election					
9 Mar	Teleseker	62.2%	24.6%	-	-	11.7%
31 Jan	Benjamin Netanyahu wins 2012 Likud leadership election					
9 Jan	Teleseker	55%	23.5%	-	-	21.5%
2011
10 Oct	Channel 10/Dialog	36%	13%	17%	14%	20%
5 Aug	Maagar	51%	28%	4%	17%	-

== See also ==
- 2013 Israeli legislative election
