= Yair Shamir =

Israeli politician (born 1945)

- יאיר שמיר
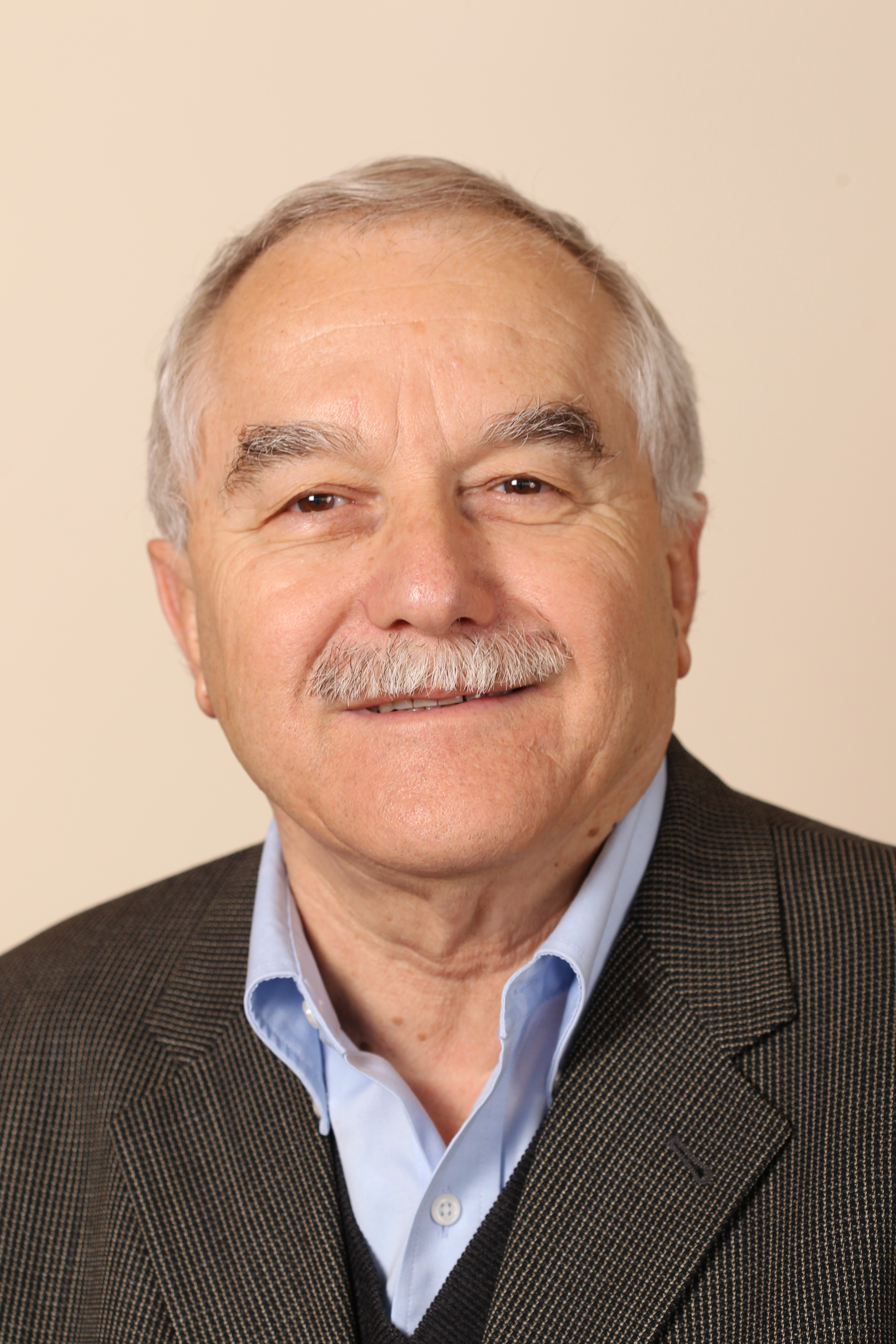

Ministerial roles
- 2013–2015: Minister of Agriculture

Faction represented in the Knesset
- 2013–2015: Yisrael Beiteinu

Personal details
- Born: 18 August 1945 (age 81) Ramat Gan, Jaffa Subdistrict, British Palestine

Yair Shamir (Hebrew: יאיר שמיר; born 18 August 1945) is an Israeli politician, businessman and former military officer. He served as a member of the Knesset for Yisrael Beiteinu between 2013 and 2015, during which he also held the post of Minister of Agriculture.

== Biography ==
=== Personal life ===
The son of former Prime Minister Yitzhak Shamir and his wife Shulamit, Yair Shamir was born in Ramat Gan and raised in Tel Aviv. He was named after Avraham "Yair" Stern, founder of Lehi, a Jewish underground movement that functioned in the years before the founding of the modern State of Israel. When he was a year old, his father Yitzhak was captured by the British and exiled to Eritrea. When Yair was two years old, his mother was arrested as a Lehi activist. The family was not reunited until the end of 1948.

Shamir lives in Savyon and is married to Ella, with whom he has three children and seven grandchildren.

=== Military career ===
Shamir served in the Israeli Air Force from 1963 to 1988 as a pilot, engineer and commander. In 1974, during his military service, Shamir completed a degree in electrical engineering at the Technion – Israel Institute of Technology. In 1988 Shamir was honorably discharged with the rank of colonel.

=== Private sector career ===
Shamir served as the general manager of Scitex Israel and as corporate vice president of Scitex (1988–1994), CEO of Elite Food Industries (1994–1995), vice president of the Challenge Fund, an Israeli venture capital fund (1995–1997), president and CEO of VCON Telecommunications (1997–2002) and as chairman (2002–2006) and managing partner of Catalyst, a venture capital fund (since 1999), chair of Shamir Optical Industry Ltd. (2005–2007) and as a member of the boards of high-tech companies such as Mercury Orckit, Mirabilis, Comfy, Longitudinal, DSP Group and Poalim Capital Markets. Between 2004 and 2005, Shamir served as chair of the board of directors of El Al, the flag-carrier of Israel.

==== Israel Aerospace Industries ====
Between 2005 and 2011, Shamir served as the chairman of Israel Aerospace Industries (IAI), where he worked without pay. After the end of his first tenure, the Finance Minister Roni Bar-On made its renewal conditional on Shamir's signing a document barring him from engaging in political activity. Despite Shamir's reluctance, his tenure was renewed.

Between 2005 and 2011, Chairman Shamir oversaw the company's phenomenal recovery. During his first year, Shamir replaced 13 of the company's 19 top managers. After he took office, the company’s net profit grew from $2 million in 2005 to $130 million in 2006. The revenues grew from $2.341 billion to $3.148 billion by 2010 with a net profit of $94 million. Under Shamir's leadership, Israel Aerospace Industries issued NIS 1.4 billion in tradable bonds. During this period the company entered the Russian market, established a leading position in the drone industry and launched four satellites into space.

Controversially, in 2011, Defense Minister Ehud Barak appointed Dov Bahrav of Amdocs as chairman. Shamir is thought to have been the key person behind IAI's initial public offering. In 2011, after six years at the IAI, Shamir became the director of the National Roads Company of Israel. According to Shamir, when he voluntarily left the army to go into business, his father would not talk to him for several months because he had held service to the country higher than material gain. However, Shamir states that he moved to the business world to promote Israel's industry and not out of material considerations.

==== Private board memberships ====
Shamir currently serves on the Board of Directors of several private companies as well as on several NASDAQ traded companies including: Commtouch (CTCH), DSP Group (DSPG), Cyalume (CYLU) and Selway (OTCBB:SWCAU).

=== Public service ===
Shamir also has several public roles and sits on the board of governors of the Technion and on the board of trustees of Ben-Gurion University of the Negev. He also serves as chairman of the board of directors of the Shalem Center.

Shamir is the chairman and co-founder of Gvahim, a non-profit organization that helps highly qualified new immigrants accomplish their professional goals in Israel. Shamir inspired and underwrote a series of Rohr Jewish Learning Institute classes commemorating the centennial of Prime Minister Yitzhak Shamir's birth.

==== Political career ====
In May 2012 Yisrael Beiteinu Chairman Avigdor Lieberman appointed Shamir deputy leader of the party. He was elected to the Knesset in the 2013 elections, and was appointed Minister of Agriculture.

In January 2015 Shamir announced that he was leaving the party and would not contest the 2015 elections due to disagreements with Lieberman over foreign policy.

In an interview given to The Jewish Press in 2004, Shamir said that he did not believe in surrendering Israeli-controlled land to the Arabs, but that he would compromise if this was necessary. He also said that then-US President George W. Bush was better for Israel than then-Israeli Prime Minister Ariel Sharon. He also criticized Benjamin Netanyahu for caving in to pressure too easily, and believed that Israel should do what it thinks is right without regard to global opinion. Shamir was also opposed to the Tannenbaum prisoner exchange with Hezbollah.
