= Akiva Govrin =

Israeli politician (1902–1980)

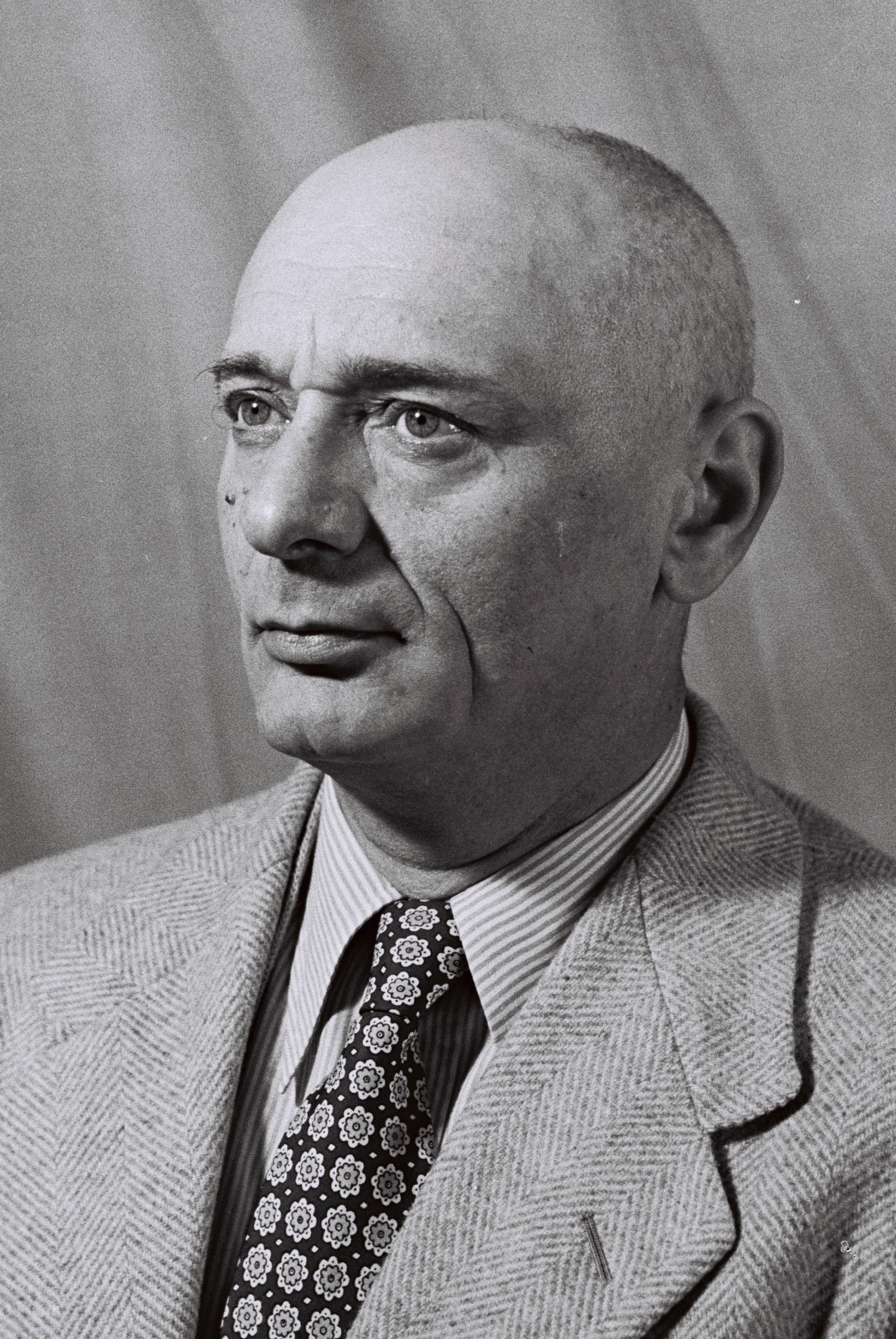
- Govrin in 1951

Ministerial roles
- 1963–1964: Minister without Portfolio
- 1964–1966: Minister of Tourism

Faction represented in the Knesset
- 1949–1965: Mapai
- 1965–1968: Alignment
- 1968–1969: Labor Party
- 1969: Alignment

Personal details
- Born: 12 August 1902 Podolia, Russian Empire
- Died: 26 June 1980 (aged 77)

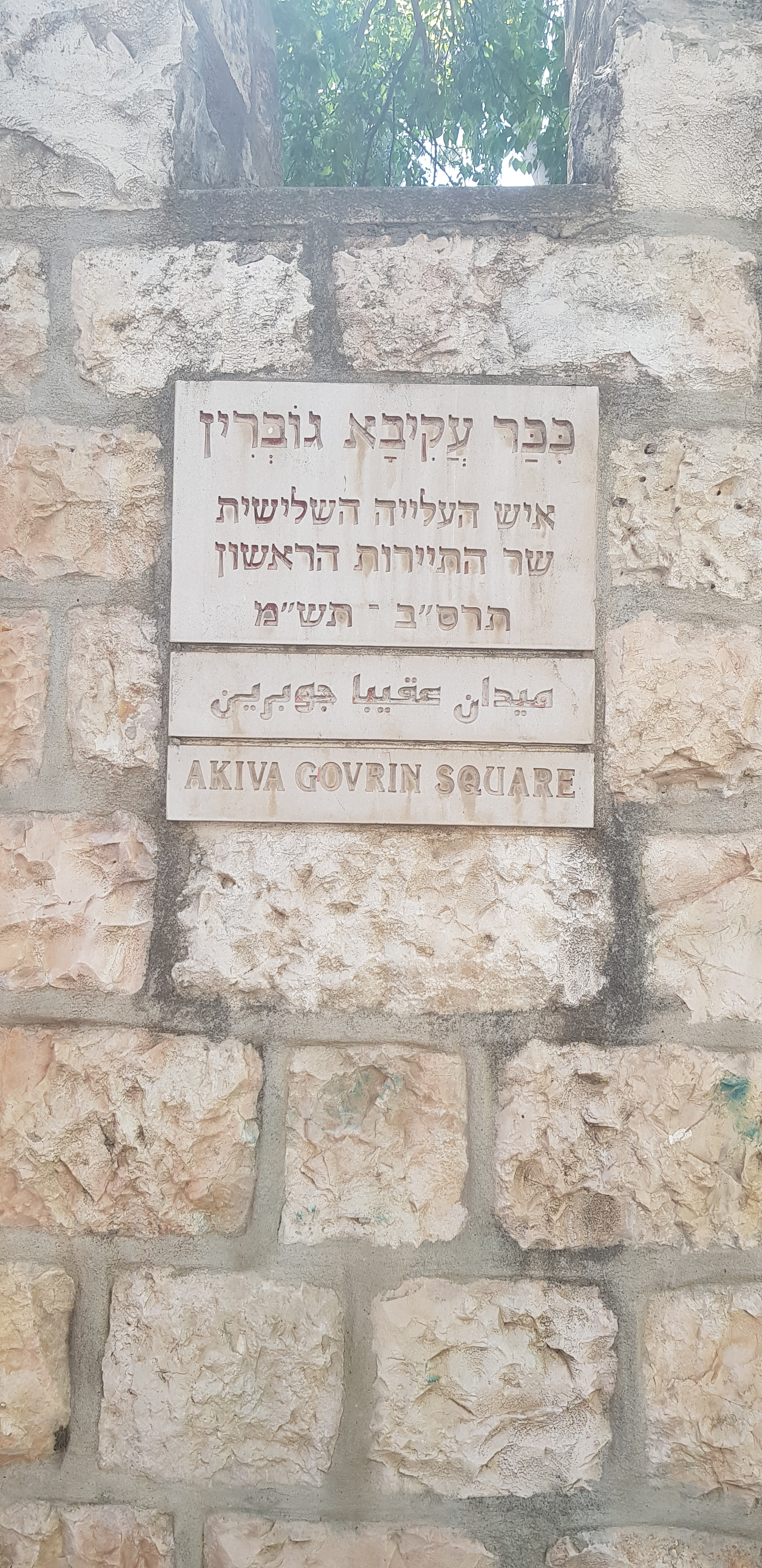
Akiva Govrin Square in Jerusalem

Akiva Govrin (Hebrew: עקיבא גוברין; 12 August 1902 – 26 June 1980) was an Israeli politician who served as a government minister between December 1963 and January 1966. He was the country's first Minister of Tourism.

== Biography ==
Born in the Podolia region of the Russian Empire (today in Ukraine), Govrin was one of the founders of the HeHalutz movement in Ukraine. He emigrated to Mandatory Palestine in 1922, and worked at Haifa Port and as a construction worker in Jerusalem, where he was one of the founders of the Jerusalem Workers' Council.

In 1925, he became a member of the actions committee of the Histadrut, and headed its unions department between 1943 and 1949. In 1949, he was elected to the Knesset on Mapai's list and was appointed chairman of the Labor committee. He was re-elected in 1951, 1955, 1959 and 1961. On 1 December 1963, he was appointed Minister without Portfolio, and when Levi Eshkol formed a new government in December 1964, Govrin became the country's first Minister of Tourism.

Although he retained his seat in the 1965 elections, he was left out of the new cabinet. He lost his seat in the 1969 elections.

His niece Michal Govrin is a novelist and theater director.
