= Faina Kirschenbaum =

Israeli politician (born 1955)

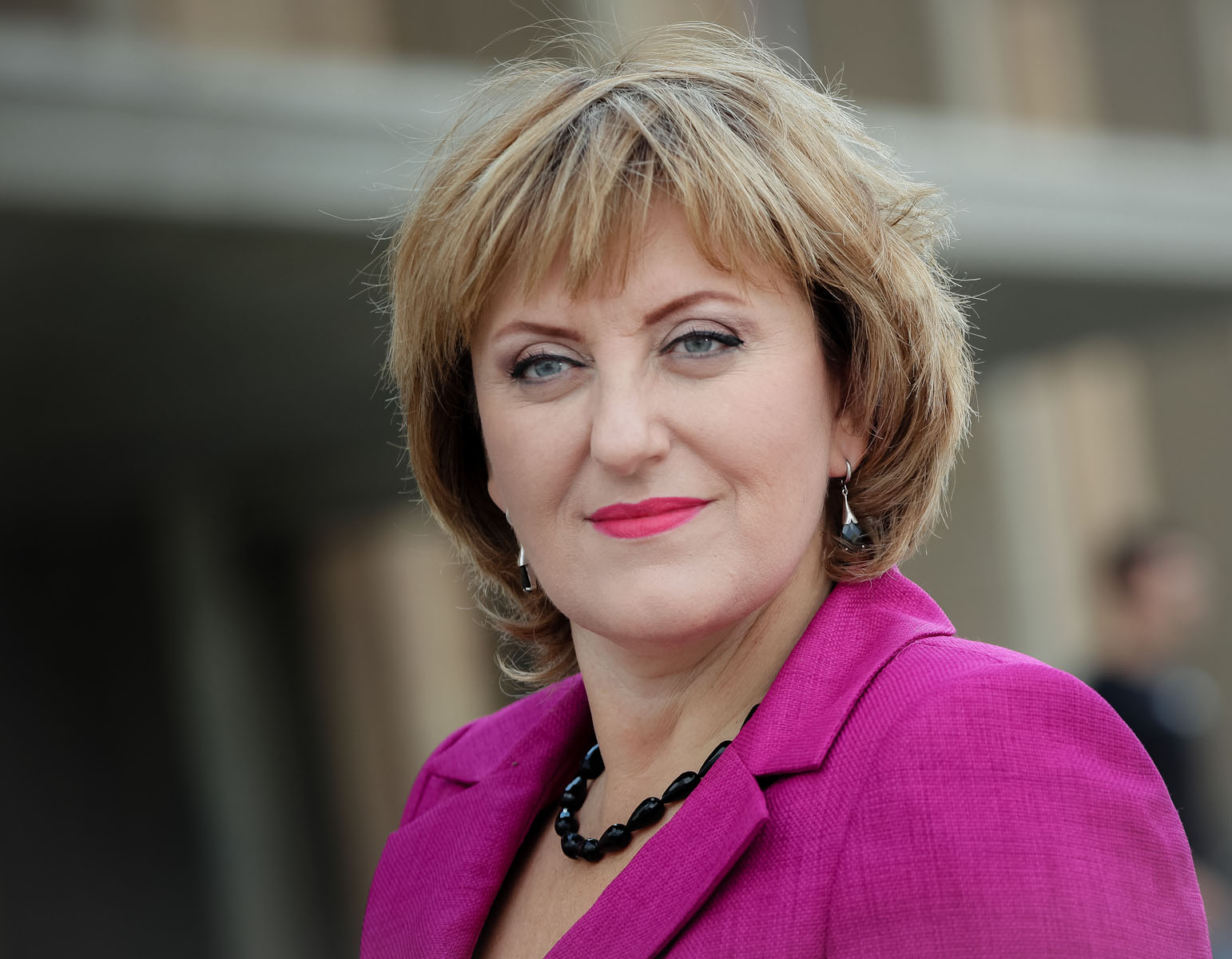
- Kirschenbaum in 2012

Faction represented in the Knesset
- 2009–2015: Yisrael Beiteinu

Personal details
- Born: 27 November 1955 (age 70) Lviv, Soviet Union

Faina Kirschenbaum (Hebrew: פאינה קירשנבאום; born 27 November 1955) is an Israeli politician who served as a member of the Knesset for Yisrael Beiteinu between 2009 and 2015. In July 2021, she was sentenced to ten years in prison following a conviction for bribery.

== Life and career ==
Born in Lviv in the Ukrainian SSR of the Soviet Union (now Ukraine), Kirschenbaum emigrated to Israel on 31 December 1973. She trained as a nurse at the Beilinson School of Nursing, and gained a BA in general studies from Thames Valley University, an MBA from the University of Derby, and a certificate in director's training at Bar-Ilan University.

In 1981, she moved to the Israeli settlement of Nili in the West Bank. She served as its council secretary and was a member of the Mateh Binyamin Regional Council. She also served as deputy chairwoman of the Israeli branch of the World Jewish Congress and as a member of the board of directors of the Museum of the Jewish Diaspora.

Prior to the 2009 elections, she served as the party's director general, was placed tenth on the Yisrael Beiteinu list and entered the Knesset as the party won 15 seats. Together with Likud MK Danny Danon, she proposed the controversial law to set up two parliamentary panels of inquiry into left-wing human rights and anti-occupation Israeli NGOs. After several months of discussion in the Knesset and Israeli press, the law, opposed by Prime Minister Benjamin Netanyahu and opposition leader Tzipi Livni, was voted against by Knesset.

She was re-elected in 2013, and joined the new government as Deputy Minister of Internal Affairs on 18 March 2013. Kirschenbaum retired from politics in January 2015 after a police investigation into corruption.

Kirschenbaum is married with three children.

== Corruption trial ==
Kirschenbaum was one of several senior government officials arrested in December 2014 on charges of bribery, fraud, and breach of trust. Her trial at the Tel Aviv District Court opened in September 2017, during which she pled not guilty to all charges. In March 2021, she was found guilty of breach of trust, bribery, fraud, money laundering and tax offences, with the court ruling that she had accepted bribes from eight sources over six years. In July 2021, the Tel Aviv District Court sentenced Kirschenbaum to ten years in prison and fined her NIS 900,000 ($274,000).
