= Yitzhak Aharonovich =

Israeli businessman and politician

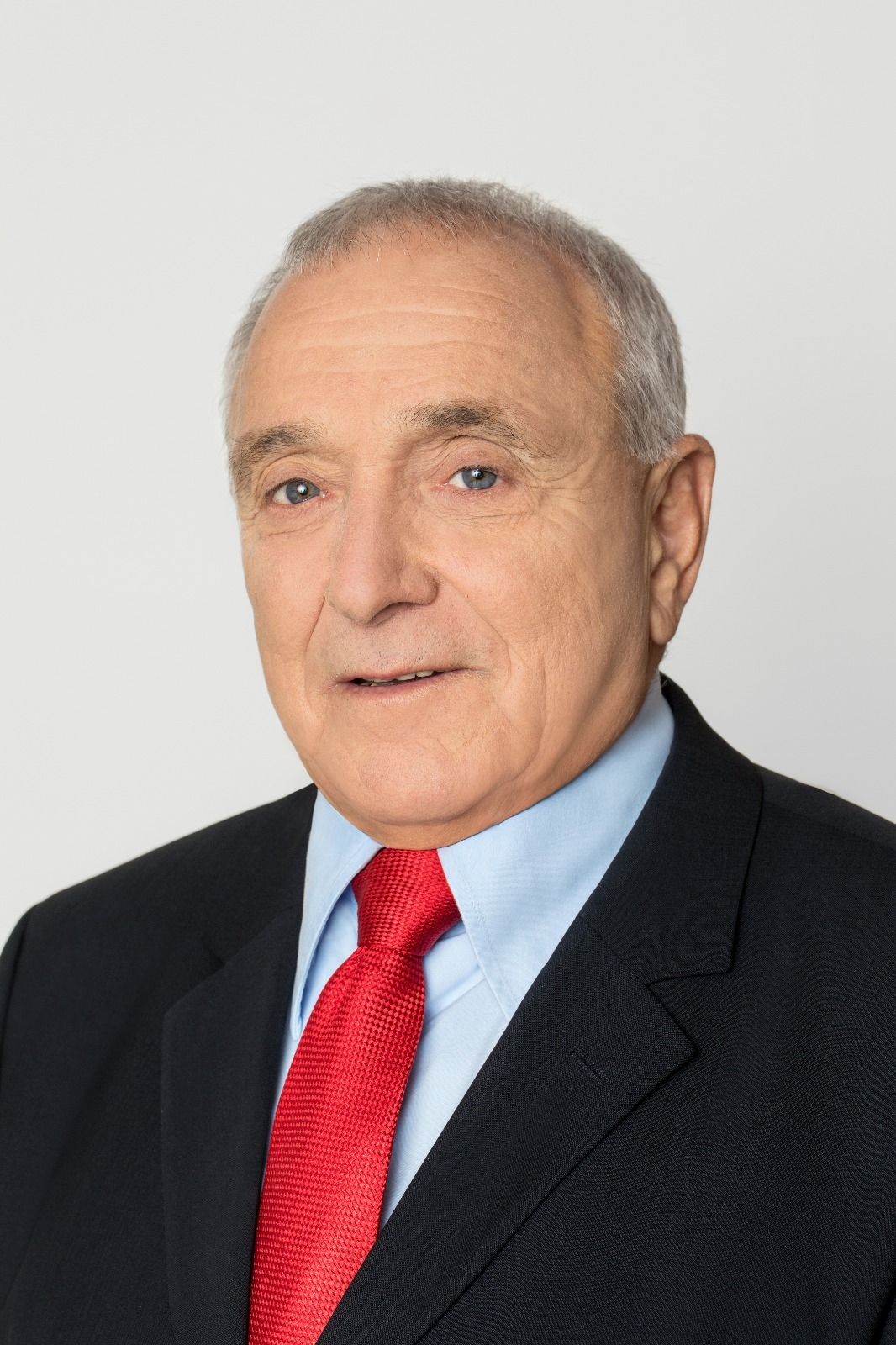

Ministerial roles
- 2007–2008: Minister of Tourism
- 2009–2015: Minister of Public Security

Faction represented in the Knesset
- 2006–2015: Yisrael Beiteinu

Personal details
- Born: 22 August 1950 (age 76) Jerusalem, Israel

Yitzhak Aharonovich (Hebrew: יצחק אהרונוביץ'; born 22 August 1950) is an Israeli businessman and former politician. He served as a member of the Knesset for Yisrael Beiteinu between 2006 and 2015 and also held the posts of Minister of Tourism and Minister of Public Security. He is currently Chairman of Mekorot.

== Biography ==
Yitzhak Aharonovich was born in West Jerusalem to Holocaust survivors from Kaunas. He grew up in moshav Dishon and studied at a yeshiva in Safed. In 1968, he began his mandatory military service in the Israel Defense Forces, and served as a deputy company commander and instructor at a training base. He later studied history at the University of Haifa and graduated with a BA. In 1972, he joined the Israel Border Police, and during the 1973 Yom Kippur War he was stationed on the border with Lebanon.

Aharonovich lives in Even Yehuda with his family.

== Military and police career ==
In the 1980s he headed the northern command of the Israel Border Police, and led rescue operations during the two Tyre catastrophes. He continued to rise through the ranks, and in 1993 he was promoted to major general and appointed commander of the Border Police. He later served as a representative of the Israel Police in the Americas for two years. In 1998 he was appointed head of police in the West Bank, and became head of the Southern District police in 2001. From 2002 to 2004 he was deputy police commissioner. In 2004, he left the police, and served as director-general of the Dan Bus Company from 2004 to 2005.

== Political career ==
In 2006 he was elected to the Knesset on Yisrael Beiteinu's list. In March 2007, he was appointed Minister of Tourism, but his tenure ended in January 2008 when the party left Ehud Olmert's coalition government. He retained his seat in the 2009 elections, for which he was placed fourth on the party's list. Upon the formation of the Netanyahu government on 31 March 2009, he was appointed Minister of Public Security.

On 16 June 2009, Aharonovich attracted controversy over a comment he made during a meeting with an undercover police detective in Tel Aviv's Central Bus Station. After the detective apologized for being untidy while meeting Aharonovich, Aharonovich replied that he looked as dirty as an "Araboosh", a Hebrew slur roughly translating as "dirty Arab". He was denounced by several members of the Knesset as a racist following that, and subsequently apologized. He was praised for his actions during the 2010 Mount Carmel forest fire. He was re-elected in the 2013 elections, and retained his post as Minister of Public Security.

In January 2015 he announced that he was retiring from politics, and would not contest the 2015 elections. and in November 2016 he became chairman of IMI Systems Ltd.
