= Yisrael Beiteinu =

Political party in Israel

Yisrael Beiteinu ישראל ביתנו إسرائيل بيتنا
- Leader: Avigdor Lieberman
- Founded: 1999; 27 years ago
- Split from: Likud
- Headquarters: Jerusalem
- Ideology: Conservatism (Israeli) (Note: Attributed to multiple references:); Economic liberalism; National liberalism; Anti-clericalism; Zionism; Russian-speakers' interests; Historical: Revisionist Zionism
- Political position: Right-wing (Note: Attributed to multiple references:)
- Knesset: 7 / 120

Election symbol
- ל ل

Website
- beytenu.org.il
- Politics of Israel; Political parties; Elections; A: It has also been described as centre-right and far-right.

Yisrael Beiteinu (Hebrew: יִשְׂרָאֵל בֵּיתֵנוּ, lit. 'Israel [is] Our Home') is a right-wing political party in Israel. The party's base was originally secular Russian-speaking immigrants, although support from that demographic is in decline. The party describes itself as "a national movement with the clear vision to follow in the bold path of Ze'ev Jabotinsky", the founder of Revisionist Zionism. In the past, it has primarily represented immigrants from the former Soviet Union, although it has since expanded its appeal to the broader Jewish Israeli population.

It takes a hard line towards the peace process and the integration of Israeli Arabs. Its main platform includes a recognition of the two-state solution, the creation of a Palestinian state that would include an exchange of some largely Arab-inhabited parts of Israel for largely Jewish-inhabited parts of the West Bank. It encourages socio-economic opportunities for new immigrants, in conjunction with efforts to increase aliyah.

The party won 15 seats in the 2009 election, its most to date, making it the third-largest party in the 18th Knesset. Despite running on a joint slate with Likud for the Nineteenth Knesset and having formed part of the Likud-led bloc in the Twentieth Knesset, leader Avigdor Lieberman has more recently been vocal in his opposition to Benjamin Netanyahu. In the 2026 election the party won seven seats.

== History ==
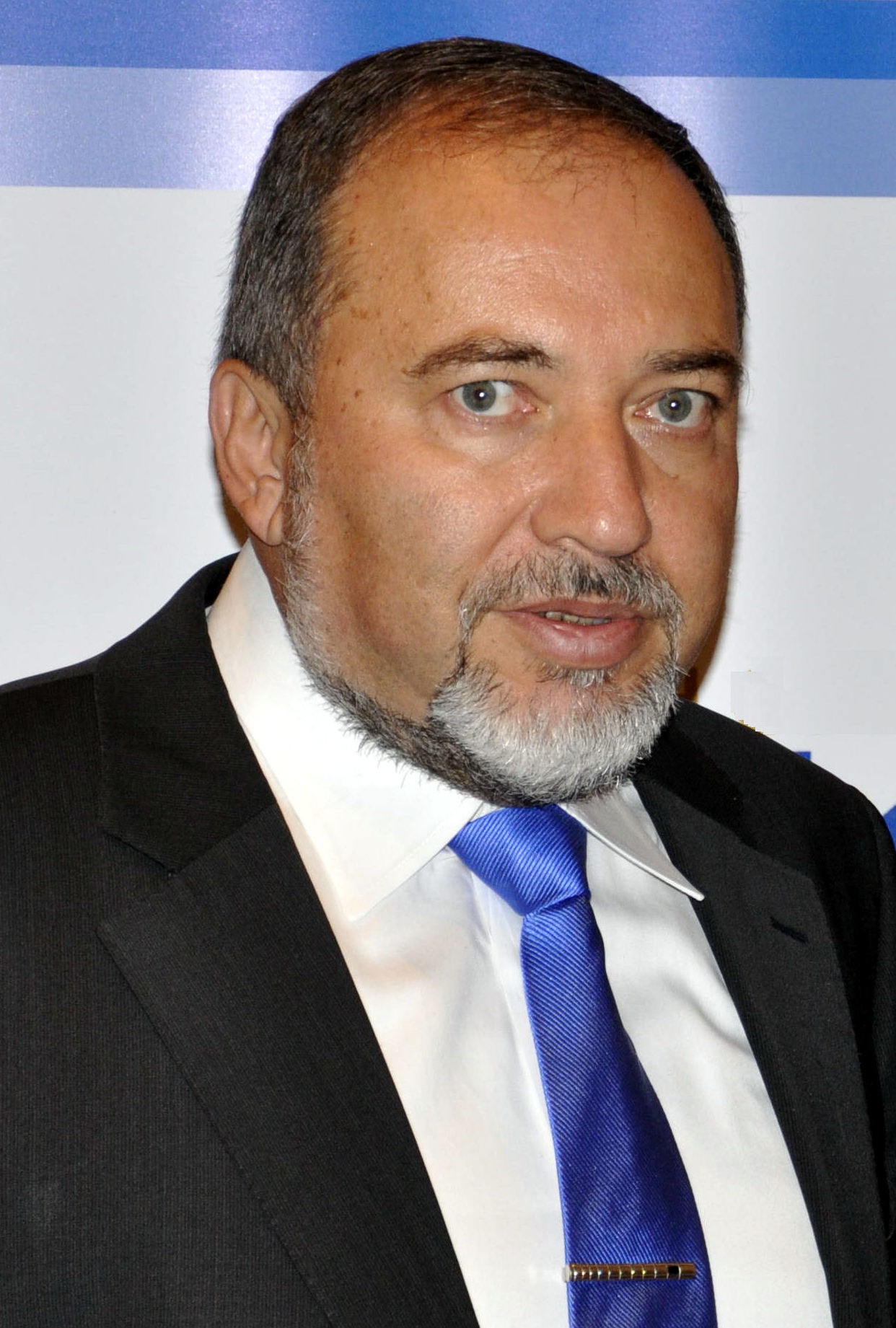
Avigdor Lieberman, when he was Minister of Foreign Affairs

Yisrael Beiteinu has its origins in the Israel of the late 1990s, when former Director-General of the Prime Minister's Office, Avigdor Lieberman was greatly disappointed by his former boss Benjamin Netanyahu and his negotiation with the Palestinian Authority. Netanyahu signed the Wye River Memorandum, which featured the division of the city of Hebron. This move was viewed by many right-wing Israelis, including many of Lieberman's own Russian-speaking community, as a betrayal of their values by Netanyahu. At the time of the Wye River Memorandum, the Russian-speaking community in Israel was mainly represented by the center-right Yisrael BaAliyah, led by Natan Sharansky, who decided not to pull his party out of Netanyahu's coalition despite the division of Hebron, which further disappointed Lieberman and other right-wing Russian-speakers. This disappointment led to two Yisrael BaAliyah Knesset members, Michael Nudelman and Yuri Stern, breaking away from the party to form their own party Aliyah.

For the 1999 legislative election, Lieberman, Nudelman and Stern formed Yisrael Beiteinu, a party whose goal was to represent the right wing of the Russian-speaking community in Israel. The new party won four seats. Due to Ehud Barak's victory in the 1999 election, the new party sat in the opposition in the new Knesset. On 1 February 2000, while sitting in the opposition, the party joined an alliance with the National Union, itself an alliance of mainly Religious Zionist right-wing parties led by Binyamin Elon, both parties remained fairly independent. The joint list joined Ariel Sharon's new unity government formed after the 2001 Israeli prime ministerial election. However, it attempted to quit the government just a few months later after Sharon's government gave another neighborhood of Hebron to the Palestinian authority. This move was delayed by Rehavam Ze'evi's assassination, but the joint list, now led by Lieberman, left the coalition in 2002 anyway.

In the 2003 Knesset election the Lieberman-led joint list won seven seats, with his Yisrael Beiteinu being given four of them. The alliance joined Ariel Sharon's government, and Lieberman was made Minister of Transport; however, the party left the government on 6 June 2004 in response to the disengagement plan. On 1 February 2006, shortly before the election that year, the party split from National Union in order to run alone. The two parties believed that they would each increase their power if they ran alone, because Yisrael Beiteinu mainly targeted Israel's right-wing secular Russian-speaking community, while the National Union mainly targeted Israel's national-religious community.

During the election campaign, Yisrael Beiteinu split from mainstream right-wing policy by offering a new peace plan based upon land and population transfers; this became known as the Lieberman plan. The party's new outlook on security was bolstered by a recent addition to the party, former Shin Bet deputy director Yisrael Hasson, who was notably not a member of the Russian-speaking community, and represented an attempt to reach out to new demographics. The 2006 election was a great success for Yisrael Beiteinu, which increased its power to 11 seats; the party joined Ehud Olmert's governing coalition in October 2006. The party entered a dispute with its coalition partner the Labor Party in January 2007, over Labor nominating Raleb Majadele for the position of Minister of Science and Technology, thereby making him Israel's first Muslim Arab minister. Lieberman condemned the nomination, and called for the resignation of the Labor Party's head Amir Peretz, accusing him of harming Israel's security by ceding to "internal rivalries" within the Labor Party, while Peretz accused Yisrael Beiteinu of being a racist party. Yisrael Beiteinu's member of Knesset (MK) Esterina Tartman referred to Peretz's decision as a "lethal blow to Zionism", adding that Majadale's presence in the cabinet would damage "Israel's character as a Jewish state" and that "We need to destroy this affliction from within ourselves. God-willing, God will come to our help." Tartman's comments were immediately condemned as racist by other MKs.

In January 2008 the party left the government in protest against talks with the Palestinian National Authority, saying certain issues negotiated were not to be tolerated. Lieberman pulled out of the government and left his position as Minister of Strategic Affairs, and almost immediately afterward, Arutz Sheva reported that an investigation against Lieberman and his daughter that had been "ongoing for years, suddenly became active again once he left the government last week".

On 22 December 2008, Lieberman approved the party's list for the 2009 legislative election. In this election Yisrael Beiteinu continued to try and reach out to new demographics. As part of this attempt, the party added Orly Levy (daughter of former Likud MK David Levy, a figure highly respected by Israel's Mizrahi community) and Likud minister Uzi Landau to its list. Yisrael Beiteinu ran a highly controversial election campaign, featuring the slogans: "No citizenship without loyalty" and "Only Lieberman understands Arabic"; these slogans were considered racist by many Israelis. These moves were a great success for Yisraeli Beiteinu, and polling showed that it could win as many as 21 seats in the Knesset. In the end, the party won 15 seats in the Knesset, making it the third-largest after Kadima (28) and Likud (27); this was the party's best election result in its history. In March 2009, Yisrael Beiteinu joined Benjamin Netanyahu's coalition, and party leader Avigdor Lieberman became Deputy Prime Minister and Foreign Affairs Minister; the party also received four other ministerial portfolios, and one deputy minister post.

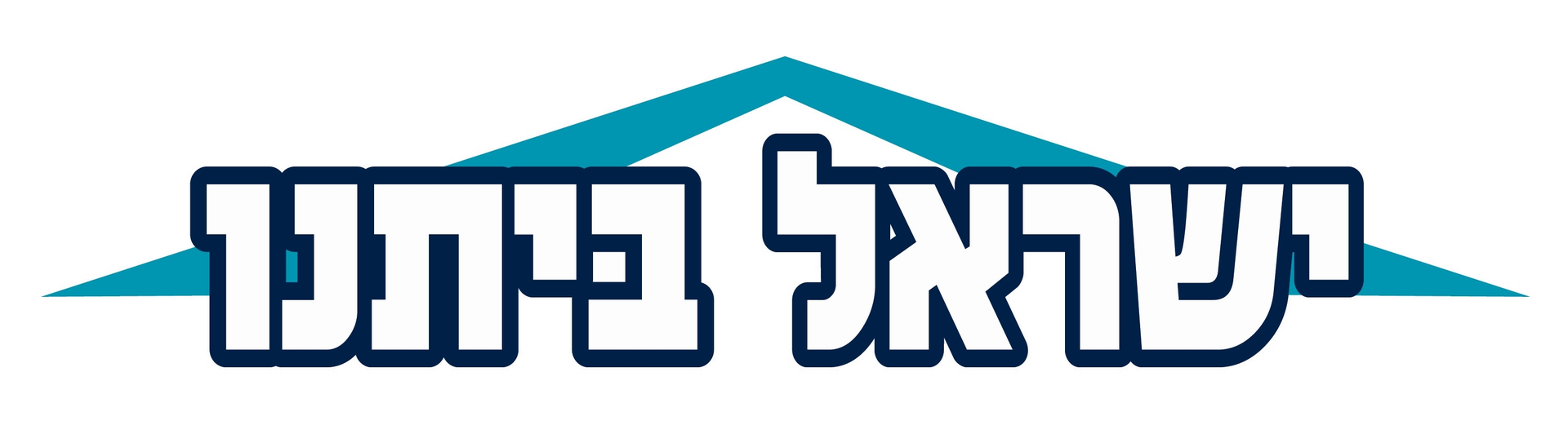
Previous logo in 2012

On 25 October 2012, Lieberman and Prime Minister Benjamin Netanyahu announced that Yisrael Beiteinu and Likud would run together on a single ballot in Israel's 22 January 2013 general elections known as Likud Yisrael Beiteinu. "In view of the challenges we're facing, we need responsibility on a national level ... We're providing a true alternative, and an opportunity for the citizens to stabilize leadership and government", Lieberman said.

The joint list was not very successful in the 2013 elections, as the combined seats of the two parties dropped from 42 to 31. Despite the fall in strength, the joint list was still able to lead Israel's new government, and Yisrael Beiteinu retained most of its strength by holding 13 seats in the joint list. Lieberman was reappointed as Netanyahu's foreign minister. The alliance was officially dissolved on 9 July 2014, and the two parties did not run together in the next elections. On 24 December, Yisrael Beiteinu was hit by a major corruption scandal, which greatly hurt the party's image in the public eye and its standing in the polls.

The 2015 elections were a disaster for Yisrael Beiteinu, as the party plummeted to just 6 MKs, losing over half its strength in the Knesset. Many of the party's former Knesset Members, such as Faina Kirschenbaum were implicated in the corruption scandal that hit the party, and therefore Lieberman had to reshuffle his list and bring forth many new people, such as the journalist Sharon Gal. Despite supporting the formation of a government by Netanyahu, Lieberman chose to keep his party in the opposition, due to personal disputes with Netanyahu and ideological disputes with the Haredi parties such as Shas and United Torah Judaism. On 26 May 2016, Yisrael Beiteinu joined Netanyahu's coalition, Lieberman himself was appointed as Minister of Defense. Orly Levy left the party over the entry into the coalition and sat as an independent Knesset Member until the next elections, where she went on to found the Gesher party.

On 14 November 2018, Lieberman announced his resignation from the Israeli government, in protest to a new Gaza ceasefire. On 16 November 2018, Netanyahu stated that he would name himself the new defense minister. As a result of Lieberman's departure, Yisrael Beiteinu also quit Netanyahu's coalition government. Lieberman's resignation was completed on 18 November 2018. The narrow government that followed Yisrael Beiteinu's departure led to Netanyahu calling a new election.

Yisrael Beytenu logo during 2019

In the resulting 2019 elections, Yisrael Beiteinu ran a campaign focused on branding itself as a party for the "Secular Right", and focused on the issue of conscripting Haredi Jews while simultaneously supporting aggressive security policy against Palestinian terrorism. During the election period, polling showed that Yisrael Beiteinu was at risk of falling below the electoral threshold required to enter the Knesset for the first time in its history, however, despite these polls, the party managed to get 5 seats in the new Knesset, giving it the ability to decide whether Netanyahu formed a right-wing government. The government formation in 2019 was somewhat of a repeat of the situation in the previous elections; Yisrael Beiteinu supported Netanyahu to form a government, but refused to join it, citing an ideological dispute with the Haredi parties over a law on Haredi conscription for remaining in the opposition. Lieberman's refusal to join Netanyahu's coalition led to new elections being called.

On 15 June 2019, ahead of the September 2019 elections, Lieberman announced that Yisrael Beiteinu would only support a national-unity government composed of Likud and the centrist Blue and White and devoid of Haredi parties. In an interview with Israel's Channel 13, Lieberman said: "We will aim for a government with Likud and with Kahol Lavan, and that will be an emergency government, a national-liberal government...We will do everything to limit the Haredim, so that they won't enter the government."

Following the 2020 Israeli legislative election, Yisrael Beiteinu won seven seats. The party endorsed Benny Gantz for prime minister, before entering the opposition.

In his campaign for the 2021 Israeli legislative election, Lieberman said he would be opposed to any coalition which included the Haredim, as well as any led by Benjamin Netanyahu, and would even be willing to go along with left-wing Meretz. The party received seven seats again, and joined the coalition with Lieberman as finance minister.

The party won seven seats in the 2026 Israeli legislative election.

== Organization ==
The supreme body in the party is the party conference, which convenes every four years. The party members elect party office-holders including the members of the party arbitration panel, the permanent commission, the municipal commission, and the comptroller.

Yisrael Beiteinu runs for local elections under the name of the city that they run in, such as Petah Tikva Beiteinu ("Petah Tikva Our Home").

In September 2019, Eli Avidar announced that the party intends to set up an LGBT caucus after the September 2019 Israeli legislative election.

== Platform and policies ==
The party has been described as occupying the far-right of the political spectrum, while other sources also describing them as right-wing. Some sources have also described the party as shifting closer to the centre-right in recent years.

=== Founding principles ===
Yisrael Beiteinu's platform begins with a description of its 10 main principles which it calls its "ten commandments":

1. Security policy based on initiative and preemptive action.
2. Solution of the conflict through a comprehensive regional agreement and the exchange of territories and populations.
3. Without loyalty there is no citizenship – Military or National Service for everyone who reaches the age of 18.
4. Death penalty for terrorists.
5. Adopting the Shamgar Report (which restricts the things the Israeli government can offer as part of a prisoner exchange) as the sole basis for all future prisoner exchange.
6. In the case of a dilemma between the unity of the land and the unity of the people, the unity of the people comes first.
7. Yes to Judaism – no to religious coercion.
8. Support for Jewish settlement as part of the Zionist ideal and concept of security.
9. Immigration of Diaspora Jews as a central national goal.
10. A socio-economic ideal in line with Ze'ev Jabotinsky's five basic needs that should be guaranteed by the government: Food, Housing, Clothing, Education and Healthcare.

=== Relations with Israeli Arabs and Palestinians ===
One of the party's main policies is that of drawing the borders in such a way that areas with large Arab populations, such as the Triangle area and the Wadi Ara, both gained by Israel as part of the 1949 Armistice Agreements, would be transferred to Arab sovereignty. Known as the Lieberman Plan, such an arrangement would mean that the majority of Jews would live in Israel and the majority of Arabs would live in a future Palestinian state. In most cases, there is no physical population transfer or demolition of houses, but creating a new border where none existed before, according to demographics.

United Nations General Assembly Resolution 55/153, written in 2001, explicitly states: "When part of the territory of a state is transferred by that state to another state, the successor state shall attribute its nationality to the persons concerned who have their habitual residence in the transferred territory and the predecessor state shall withdraw its nationality from such persons", and Lieberman claims that this means Israel can legally transfer territory and citizens as a means of peace and ultimate conflict resolution.

Avigdor Lieberman argues that the Arab residents see themselves not as Israelis, but as Palestinians, and should, therefore, be encouraged to join the Palestinian Authority. Lieberman has presented this proposal as part of a potential peace deal aimed at establishing two separate national entities, one for Jews in Israel and the other for Arabs in Palestine. However, he is known to have an affinity for, and is popular among, the Druze population (the only non-Jewish, Arabic-speaking male population to be fully drafted into the IDF), and has attracted a number of Druze voters, including some in the Golan Heights who voted for the party in protest. Druze candidate Hamad Amar was elected to the Knesset on the party's list in 2009.

Yisrael Beiteinu played a crucial role in passing a law that would fine bodies that receive state funding being spent in recognition of Nakba Day, and events that call for the end of Israel as a Jewish State.

=== Security policy ===
Yisrael Beiteinu supports a hawkish security policy, emphasizing preemptive strikes against Hamas and other opponents of Israel. Yisrael Beiteinu's security policy, as laid out in the party's platform, is:

1. Renewing the discontinued policy of the targeted killing of terror leaders.
2. Reducing the amount of tax money collected by Israel given to the Palestinian Authority in proportion to the amount of money given to terrorists sitting in Israeli prisons and their families.
3. Ending the transfer of Qatari funds to Hamas by the Israeli government.
4. Death penalty for terrorists.
5. Ending the policy of returning terrorist corpses to their families.
6. Demolishing the houses of all terrorists, not only terrorists who have committed murder.
7. Revocation of residency from citizens of East Jerusalem who were convicted of terrorism.
8. Deportation of those who systematically incite terrorism from Jerusalem, the West Bank and the Gaza Strip

=== Religion and state ===
Yisrael Beiteinu's platform states that the party opposes the separation of religion and state. Its platform says that in a country where religion and nationality are two parts of the same whole, religion and state cannot be separated. However, Yisrael Beiteinu's platform states that religion should be separated from political activity, the party believes that religion should not be a source of income and instead should be preserved as a source of "inspiration and belief" for every Jew. Despite the platform's statement that the party opposes separation of religion and state, the party is considered a force for secularism in Israel, and is strongly opposed to the religious policies of Israel's Haredi parties.

Yisrael Beiteinu's policies on Religion and State, as stated by their platform are as follows:

- Compulsory national or military service for all Haredi Jews.
- Permitting city Rabbis to perform conversions. Currently this right is reserved for the Chief Rabbinate of Israel.
- The opening of the registration areas for marriage, so that couples can marry in any city and with any Rabbi that they desire.
- The operation of public transportation on Shabbat, in neighborhoods with demand for it and without significant religious population.
- Opposition to the "Supermarket law", which bans the operation of businesses on Shabbat.
- The party opposes DNA tests for Jewish converts or for Jews of Russian descent.

=== Economic policies ===
Yisrael Beiteinu favors a broadly economically liberal vision of the economy. Its platform opposes increasing taxes and supports a decrease in regulations and an increase in support to small businesses. Despite this broadly liberal view of the economy, the party supports an increase in spending for healthcare and its flagship economic policy is increasing the minimum pension given to pensioners to 70% of the minimum wage.

Yisrael Beiteinu's solution for Israel's housing crisis is cancelling the tax on the usage of pension funds of young couples who want to buy a home with the money.

== Current Knesset members ==
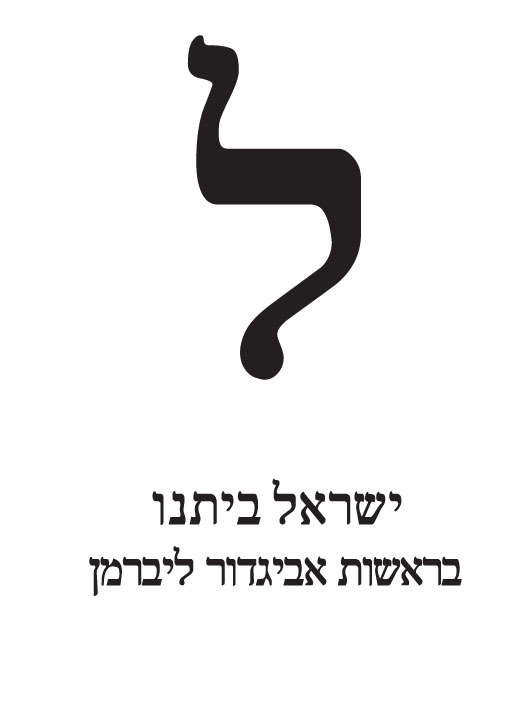
YB party ballot

Yisrael Beiteinu currently has seven Knesset members:

Year	Members	Total
2026–	Avigdor Lieberman, Rafi Ben Shitrit, Talya Lankri, Oded Forer, Yulia Malinovsky, Sharon Sharabi, Hamad Amar	7

== Election results ==
=== Knesset ===
Election	Leader	Votes	%	Seats	+/–	Status
1999	Avigdor Lieberman	86,153	2.6 (#13)	4 / 120	New	Opposition
2003	Avigdor Lieberman	part of National Union		3 / 120	▼1	Coalition
2006	Avigdor Lieberman	281,880	8.99 (#5)	11 / 120	▲8	Coalition
2009	Avigdor Lieberman	394,577	11.70 (#3)	15 / 120	▲4	Coalition
2013	Avigdor Lieberman	with Likud		13 / 120	▼2	Coalition
2015	Avigdor Lieberman	214,906	5.11 (#8)	6 / 120	▼7	Opposition (2015–2016)
2015	Avigdor Lieberman	214,906	5.11 (#8)	6 / 120	▼7	Coalition (2016–2018)
2015	Avigdor Lieberman	214,906	5.11 (#8)	6 / 120	▼7	Opposition (2018–2019)
Apr 2019	Avigdor Lieberman	173,004	4.01 (#7)	5 / 120	▼1	Snap election
Sep 2019	Avigdor Lieberman	310,154	6.99 (#5)	8 / 120	▲3	Snap election
2020	Avigdor Lieberman	263,365	5.74 (#7)	7 / 120	▼1	Opposition
2021	Avigdor Lieberman	248,370	5.63 (#8)	7 / 120	0	Coalition
2022	Avigdor Lieberman	213,655	4.49 (#7)	6 / 120	▼1	Opposition
2026	Avigdor Lieberman	337,450	5.93 (#6)	7 / 120	▲1	TBA
