= Nineteenth government of Israel =

1981–83 government led by Menachem Begin

Second Begin Cabinet
- 19th Cabinet of Israel

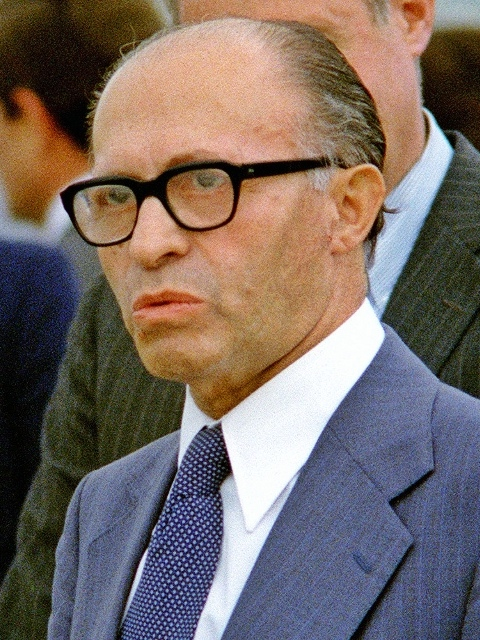
- Date formed: 5 August 1981
- Date dissolved: 28 August 1983

People and organisations
- Head of state: Yitzhak Navon (until 5 May 1983); Chaim Herzog (from 5 May 1983)
- Head of government: Menachem Begin
- Member parties: Likud; National Religious Party; Telem; Tami; Tehiya; Movement for the Renewal of Social Zionism; Agudat Yisrael
- Status in legislature: Coalition government
- Opposition party: Alignment
- Opposition leader: Shimon Peres

History
- Election: 1981
- Legislature term: 10th Knesset
- Predecessor: 18th Cabinet of Israel
- Successor: 20th Cabinet of Israel

The nineteenth government of Israel was formed by Menachem Begin on 5 August 1981 following the June 1981 elections. Begin included Likud, the National Religious Party, Agudat Yisrael, Tami and Telem in his coalition, which held 63 of the 120 seats in the Knesset, and the cabinet had 17 ministers. On 26 August Tehiya joined the coalition, and the number of ministers rose to 18.

Begin resigned as Prime Minister in August 1983, and Yitzhak Shamir formed the twentieth government on 10 October, which held office until after the 1984 elections.

== Cabinet members ==
Position	Person	Party
Prime Minister	Menachem Begin	Likud
Deputy Prime Minister	Simha Erlich (until 19 June 1983) (Note: Died in office)	Likud
Deputy Prime Minister	David Levy (from 3 November 1981)	Likud
Minister of Agriculture	Simha Erlich (until 19 June 1983)	Likud
Minister of Agriculture	Menachem Begin	Likud
Minister of Communications	Mordechai Tzipori	Likud
Minister of Defense	Ariel Sharon (until 14 February 1983)	Likud
Minister of Defense	Menachem Begin (14–23 February 1983)	Likud
Minister of Defense	Moshe Arens (from 23 February 1983)	Not an MK (Note: Although Arens was not an MK at the time, he had previously been elected to the Knesset on the Likud list.)
Minister of Economics and Inter-Ministry Co-ordination	Ya'akov Meridor	Likud
Minister of Education and Culture	Zevulun Hammer	National Religious Party
Minister of Energy and Infrastructure	Yitzhak Berman (until 30 September 1982) (Note: Berman resigned from the government due to its attitude towards the Kahan Commission.)	Likud
Minister of Energy and Infrastructure	Yitzhak Moda'i (from 19 October 1982)	Likud
Minister of Finance	Yoram Aridor	Likud
Minister of Foreign Affairs	Yitzhak Shamir	Likud
Minister of Health	Eliezer Shostak	Likud
Minister of Housing and Construction	David Levy	Likud
Minister of Immigrant Absorption	Aharon Abuhatzira (until 4 May 1982) (Note: Abuhatzira resigned from the government after being convicted of larceny, breach of trust and fraud.)	Tami
Minister of Immigrant Absorption	Aharon Uzan (from 4 May 1982)	Tami
Minister of Industry and Trade	Gideon Patt	Likud
Minister of Internal Affairs	Yosef Burg	National Religious Party
Minister of Justice	Moshe Nissim	Likud
Minister of Labour and Social Welfare	Aharon Abuhatzira (until 2 May 1982)	Tami
Minister of Labour and Social Welfare	Aharon Uzan (from 3 May 1982)	Tami
Minister of Religious Affairs	Yosef Burg	National Religious Party
Minister of Science and Development	Yuval Ne'eman (from 26 July 1982)	Tehiya
Minister of Tourism	Gideon Patt (until 11 August 1981)	Likud
Minister of Tourism	Avraham Sharir (from 1 August 1981)	Likud
Minister of Transportation	Haim Corfu	Likud
Minister without Portfolio	Yitzhak Moda'i (until 19 October 1982)	Likud
Minister without Portfolio	Mordechai Ben-Porat (from 5 July 1982)	Telem, Movement for the Renewal of Social Zionism
Minister without Portfolio	Ariel Sharon (from 14 February 1982)	Likud
Minister without Portfolio	Sarah Doron (from 5 July 1983)	Likud
Deputy Minister in the Prime Minister's Office	Dov Shilansky	Likud
Deputy Minister of Agriculture	Michael Dekel	Likud
Deputy Minister of Agriculture	Pesach Grupper	Likud
Deputy Minister of Defense	Mordechai Tzipori	Likud
Deputy Minister of Education and Culture	Miriam Glazer-Ta'asa	Likud
Deputy Minister of Finance	Haim Kaufman (from 28 August 1981)	Likud
Deputy Minister of Housing and Construction	Moshe Katsav	Likud
Deputy Minister of Immigrant Absorption	Aharon Uzan (until 5 May 1982)	Tami
Deputy Minister of Labour and Social Welfare	Ben-Zion Rubin	Tami
Deputy Minister of Religious Affairs	Haim Drukman (until 2 March 1982)	National Religious Party
Deputy Minister of Transportation	David Shiffman (until 18 October 1982)	Likud
