= Twentieth government of Israel =

1983–84 government led by Yitzhak Shamir

First Shamir Cabinet
- 20th Cabinet of Israel

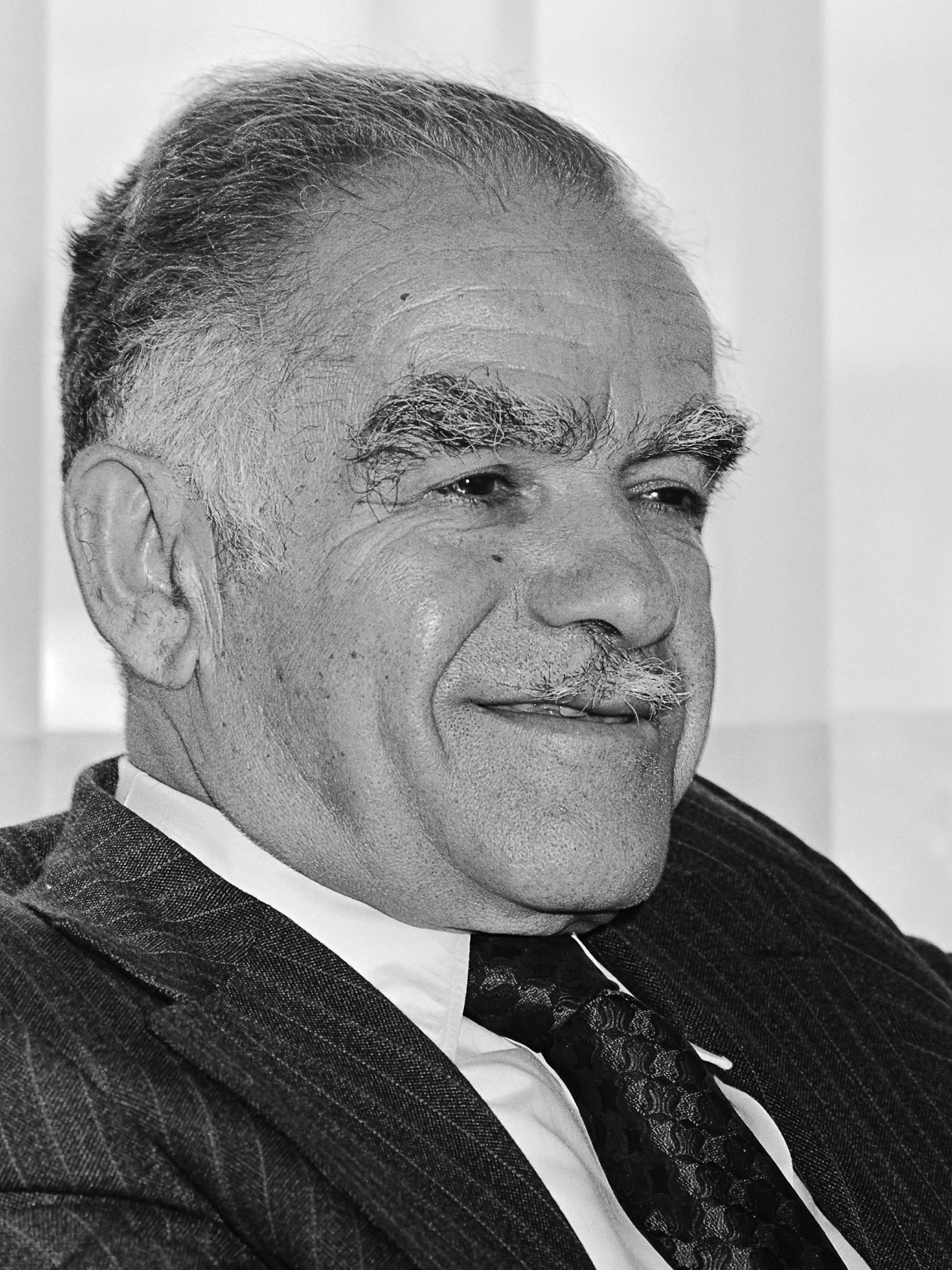
- Date formed: 10 October 1983
- Date dissolved: 13 September 1984

People and organisations
- Head of state: Chaim Herzog
- Head of government: Yitzhak Shamir
- Member parties: Likud; National Religious Party; Tami; Tehiya; Movement for the Renewal of Social Zionism; Agudat Yisrael
- Status in legislature: Coalition government
- Opposition party: Alignment
- Opposition leader: Shimon Peres

History
- Legislature term: 10th Knesset
- Predecessor: 19th Cabinet of Israel
- Successor: 21st Cabinet of Israel

The twentieth government of Israel was formed by Yitzhak Shamir of Likud on 10 October 1983, following the resignation of Prime Minister Menachen Begin on 28 August.

Shamir kept the same coalition partners as the previous government, i.e. the National Religious Party, Agudat Yisrael, Tami and the Movement for the Renewal of Social Zionism. The coalition held 62 of the 120 seats in the Knesset. All ministers kept their roles from the previous government, with the only changes being that Shamir replaced Begin as Prime Minister (whilst keeping the Foreign Affairs portfolio), Pesah Grupper being promoted from Deputy Minister of Agriculture (also replacing Begin, who had held the portfolio before), Mordechai Tzipori losing his Deputy Minister of Defense role, and Yehuda Ben-Meir becoming Deputy Minister of Foreign Affairs.

The government held office until 13 September the following year, when the twenty-first government was formed following the July 1984 elections.

Israeli government formation, 1983
- 10 October 1983
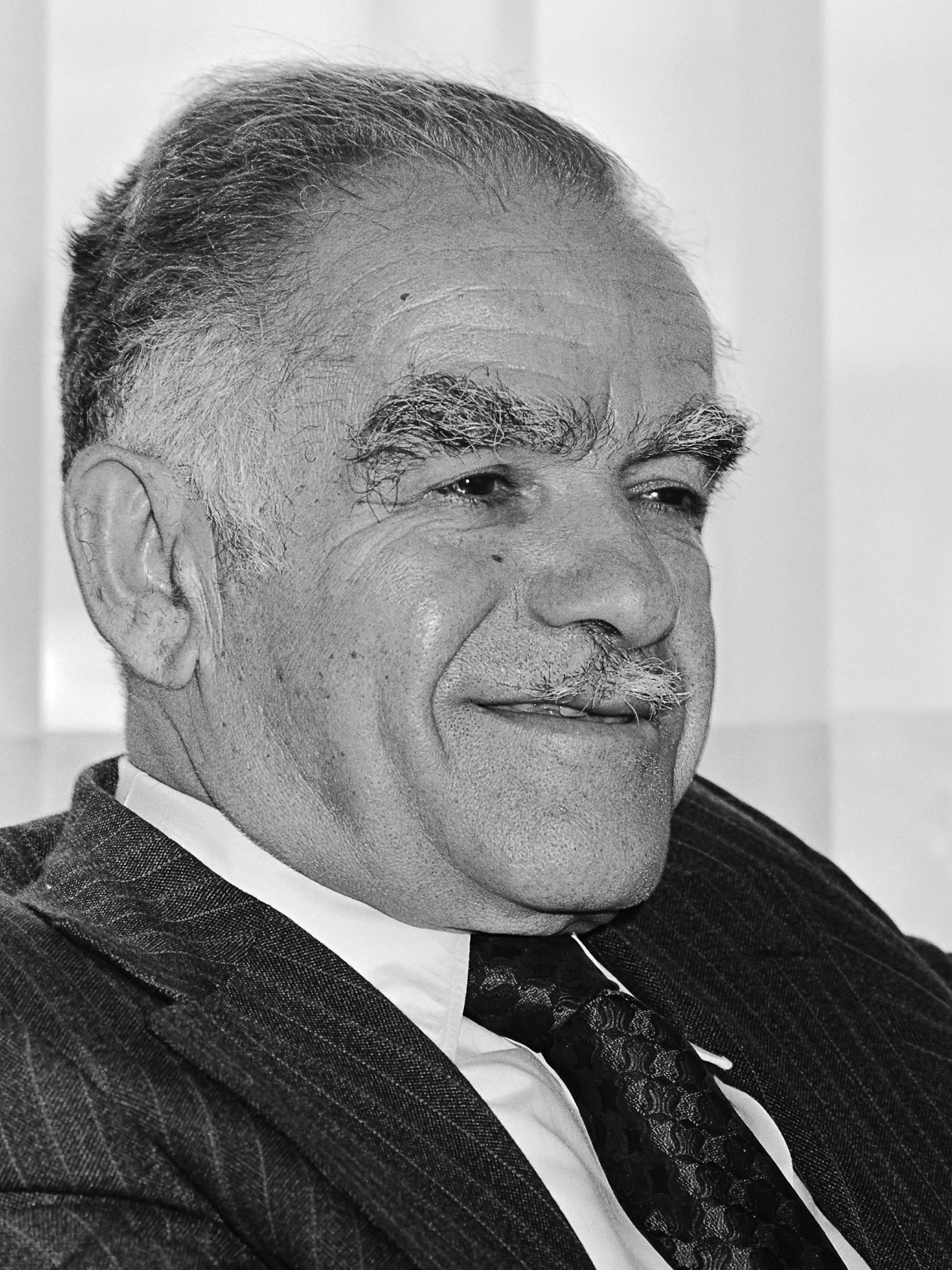

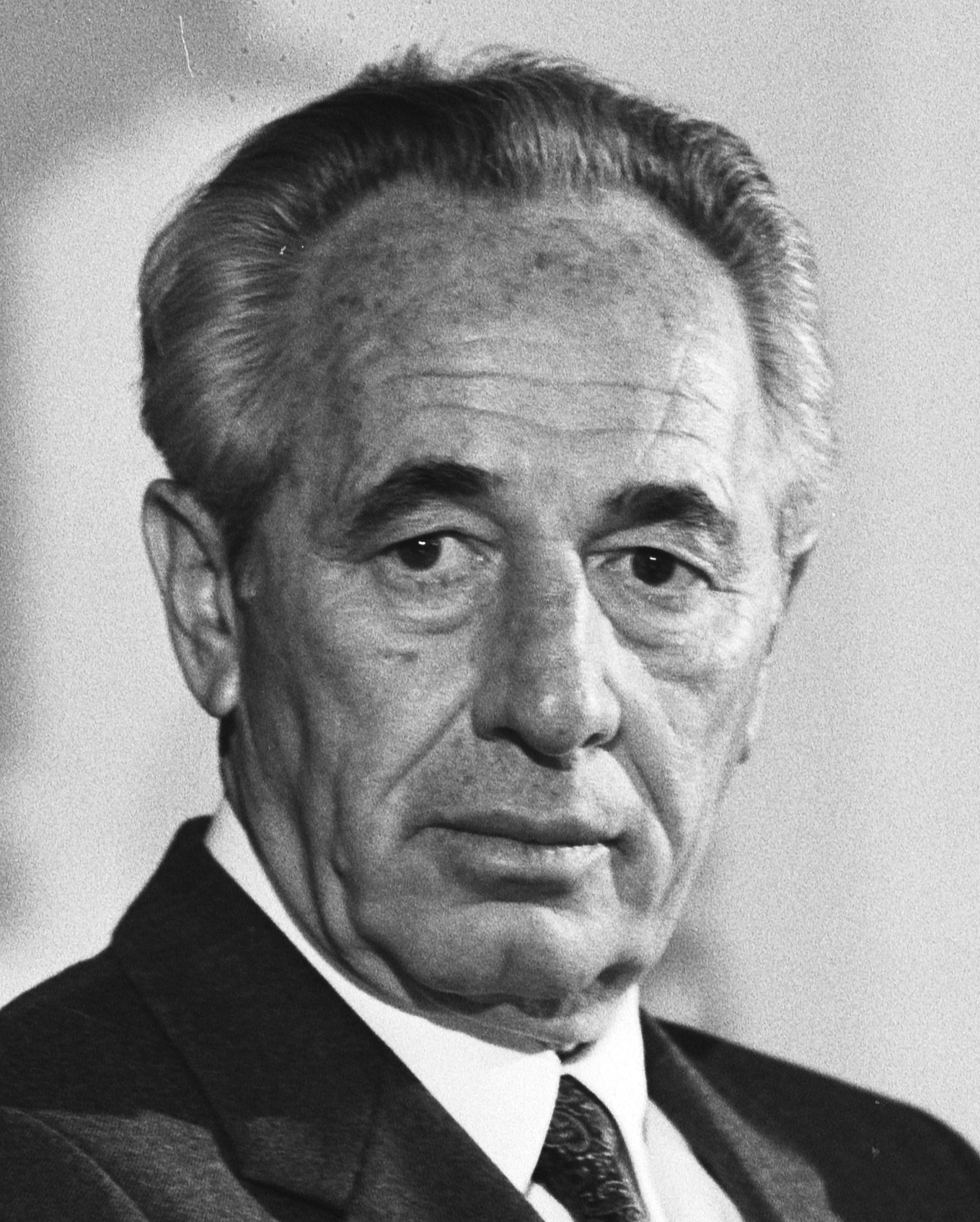
Nominee	Yitzhak Shamir	Shimon Peres
Party	Likud	Alignment
Electoral vote	62	58
Percentage	51.7%	48.3%
Prime Minister before election
Menachem Begin
Likud
Elected Prime Minister
Yitzhak Shamir
Likud

== Cabinet members ==
Position	Person	Party
Prime Minister	Yitzhak Shamir	Likud
Deputy Prime Minister	David Levy	Likud
Minister of Agriculture	Pesah Grupper	Likud
Minister of Communications	Mordechai Tzipori	Likud
Minister of Defense	Moshe Arens	Not an MK ^{1}
Minister of Economics and Inter-Ministry Co-ordination	Ya'akov Meridor	Likud
Minister of Education and Culture	Zevulun Hammer	National Religious Party
Minister of Energy and Infrastructure	Yitzhak Moda'i	Likud
Minister of Finance	Yoram Aridor (until 15 October 1983)	Likud
Minister of Finance	Yigal Cohen-Orgad (from 15 October 1983)	Likud
Minister of Foreign Affairs	Yitzhak Shamir	Likud
Minister of Health	Eliezer Shostak	Likud
Minister of Housing and Construction	David Levy	Likud
Minister of Immigrant Absorption	Aharon Uzan	Tami
Minister of Industry and Trade	Gideon Patt	Likud
Minister of Internal Affairs	Yosef Burg	National Religious Party
Minister of Justice	Moshe Nissim	Likud
Minister of Labour and Social Welfare	Aharon Uzan	Tami
Minister of Religious Affairs	Yosef Burg	National Religious Party
Minister of Science and Development	Yuval Ne'eman	Tehiya
Minister of Tourism	Avraham Sharir	Likud
Minister of Transportation	Haim Corfu	Likud
Minister without Portfolio	Mordechai Ben-Porat (until 31 January 1984)	Movement for the Renewal of Social Zionism
Minister without Portfolio	Ariel Sharon	Likud
Minister without Portfolio	Sarah Doron	Likud
Deputy Minister in the Prime Minister's Office	Dov Shilansky	Likud
Deputy Minister of Agriculture	Michael Dekel	Likud
Deputy Minister of Education and Culture	Miriam Glazer-Ta'asa	Likud
Deputy Minister of Finance	Haim Kaufman	Likud
Deputy Minister of Foreign Affairs	Yehuda Ben-Meir	National Religious Party
Deputy Minister of Housing and Construction	Moshe Katsav	Likud
Deputy Minister of Labour and Social Welfare	Ben-Zion Rubin	Tami

^{1} Although Arens was not an MK at the time, he had been elected to the Knesset on the Likud list.
