= Seventeenth government of Israel =

1974–77 government led by Yitzhak Rabin

First Rabin Cabinet
- 17th Cabinet of Israel

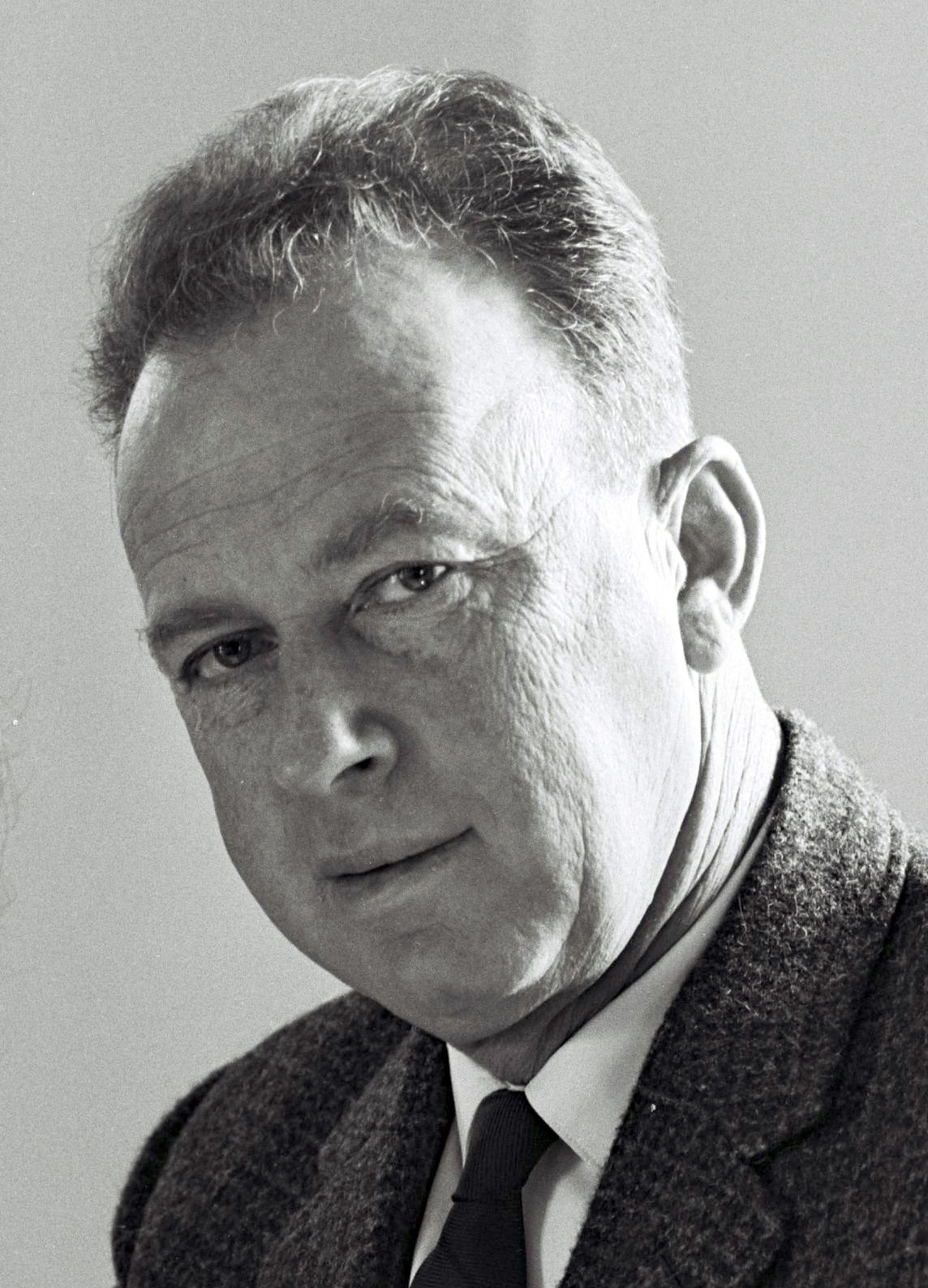
- Date formed: 3 June 1974
- Date dissolved: 21 June 1977

People and organisations
- Head of state: Ephraim Katzir
- Head of government: Yitzhak Rabin
- Member parties: Alignment; National Religious Party (from 30 October 1974); Ratz (until 6 November 1974); Independent Liberals
- Status in legislature: Coalition
- Opposition leader: Menachem Begin

History
- Legislature term: 8th Knesset
- Predecessor: 16th Cabinet of Israel
- Successor: 18th Cabinet of Israel

The seventeenth government of Israel was formed by Yitzhak Rabin on 3 June 1974, following the resignation of Prime Minister Golda Meir on 11 April and Rabin's election as Labor Party leader on 26 April. It was the first time an Israeli government had been led by a native-born Israeli (although Rabin was born in the British Mandate for Palestine prior to independence).

As well as the 54-seat Alignment (of which the Labor Party was the largest faction, alongside Mapam and the two Labor-affiliated Israeli Arab parties, Progress and Development and the Arab List for Bedouin and Villagers, which merged into the United Arab List towards the end of the Knesset term), Rabin also included the Independent Liberals, who held four seats, and Ratz, which had three. The coalition had only a one-seat majority, with just 61 of the 120 seats in the Knesset, and was the first in Israeli political history to not contain a religious party. This status lasted until 30 October when the National Religious Party (NRP) joined the coalition, taking the number of seats up to 71, although Ratz left on 6 November, reducing the number by three. In forming the government, Rabin dropped the development portfolio.

The government was dissolved by Rabin on 22 December 1976, following the abstention of the NRP on a vote of no confidence regarding an apparent breach of the Sabbath during a ceremony at an Israeli Air Force base, but continued, without the NRP members, who all resigned on 22 December, as a caretaker government until the formation of the eighteenth government following the May 1977 elections. However, following the Dollar Account affair in March 1977, Rabin announced on 6 April that he was resigning as head of the Labor Party, and Minister of Defense Shimon Peres was unanimously elected to succeed him. As Israeli law prohibited resignation from a caretaker government, Rabin suspended himself from his duties as Prime Minister and Peres took his place as an unofficial acting Prime Minister.

Israeli government formation, June 1974
- 3 June 1974
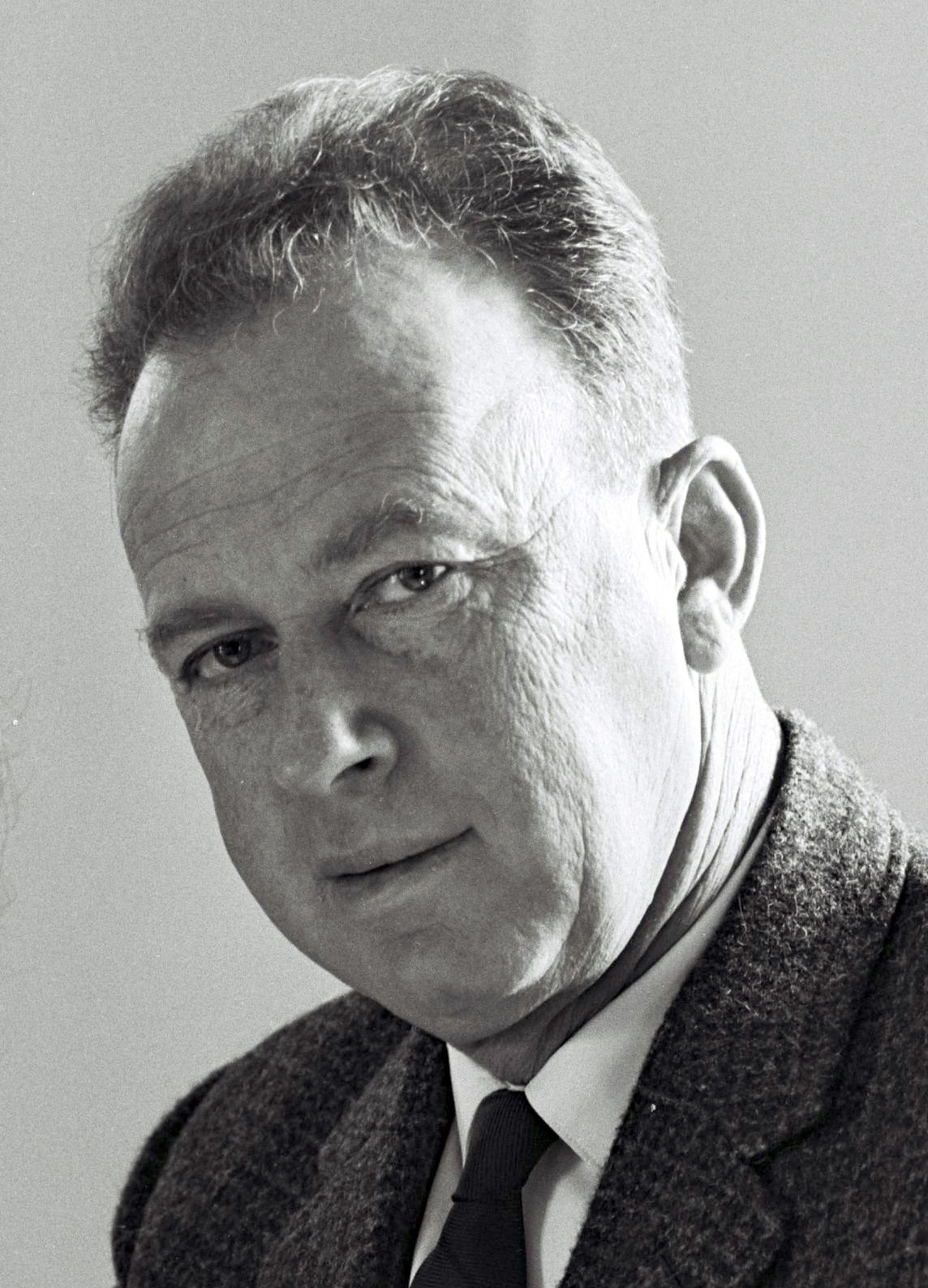

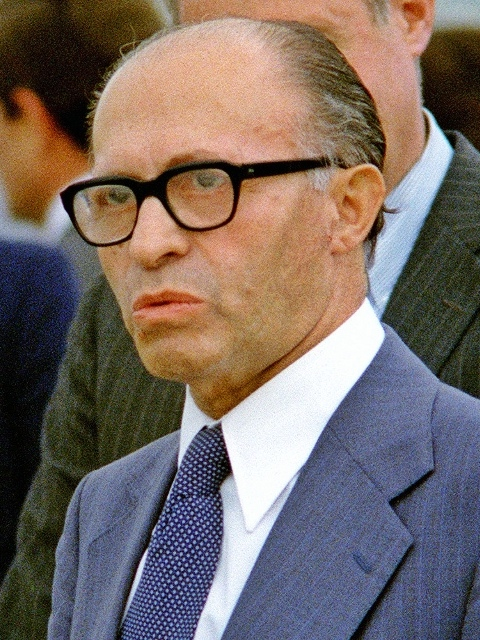
Nominee	Yitzhak Rabin	Menachem Begin
Party	Alignment	Likud
Electoral vote	61	59
Percentage	50.8%	49.2%
Prime Minister before election
Golda Meir
Alignment
Elected Prime Minister
Yitzhak Rabin
Alignment

== Cabinet members ==
Position	Person	Party
Prime Minister	Yitzhak Rabin	Alignment
Deputy Prime Minister	Yigal Allon	Alignment
Minister of Agriculture	Aharon Uzan	Not an MK ^{1}
Minister of Communications	Yitzhak Rabin (until 20 March 1975)	Alignment
Minister of Communications	Aharon Uzan (from 20 March 1975)	Not an MK ^{1}
Minister of Defense	Shimon Peres	Alignment
Minister of Education and Culture	Aharon Yadlin	Alignment
Minister of Finance	Yehoshua Rabinowitz ^{2}	Not an MK
Minister of Foreign Affairs	Yigal Allon	Alignment
Minister of Health	Victor Shem-Tov	Not an MK ^{1}
Minister of Housing	Avraham Ofer (until 3 January 1977)^{3}	Alignment
Minister of Housing	Shlomo Rosen (from 16 January 1977)	Not an MK ^{1}
Minister of Immigrant Absorption	Shlomo Rosen	Not an MK ^{1}
Minister of Information	Aharon Yariv	Alignment
Minister of Internal Affairs	Shlomo Hillel (until 29 October 1974)	Alignment
Minister of Internal Affairs	Yosef Burg (29 October 1974 - 22 December 1976)	National Religious Party
Minister of Internal Affairs	Shlomo Hillel (from 16 January 1977)	Alignment
Minister of Justice	Haim Yosef Zadok	Alignment
Minister of Labour	Moshe Baram	Alignment
Minister of Police	Shlomo Hillel	Alignment
Minister of Religions	Haim Yosef Zadok (until 29 October 1974)	Alignment
Minister of Religions	Yitzhak Rafael (30 October 1974 - 22 December 1976)	National Religious Party
Minister of Religions	Haim Yosef Zadok (from 16 January 1977)	Alignment
Minister of Tourism	Moshe Kol	Not an MK ^{4}
Minister of Trade and Industry	Haim Bar-Lev	Not an MK ^{2}
Minister of Transportation	Gad Yaacobi	Alignment
Minister of Welfare	Victor Shem-Tov (until 29 October 1974)	Not an MK ^{1}
Minister of Welfare	Michael Hasani (30 October 1974 - 2 July 1975)^{5}	National Religious Party
Minister of Welfare	Yitzhak Rabin (7 July 1975 - 29 July 1975)	Alignment
Minister of Welfare	Yosef Burg (29 July 1975 - 4 November 1975)	National Religious Party
Minister of Welfare	Zevulun Hammer (4 November 1975 - 22 December 1976)	National Religious Party
Minister of Welfare	Moshe Baram (from 16 January 1977)	Alignment
Minister without Portfolio	Shulamit Aloni (until 6 November 1974)	Ratz
Minister without Portfolio	Yisrael Galili	Alignment
Minister without Portfolio	Gideon Hausner	Not an MK ^{4}
Deputy Minister of Agriculture	Jabr Muadi (from 24 March 1975)	Alignment, Progress and Development, United Arab List
Deputy Minister of Communications	Jabr Muadi (until 24 March 1975)	Alignment
Deputy Minister of Communications	Eliyahu Moyal (from 24 March 1975)	Alignment

^{1} Although Rosen, Shem-Tov and Uzan were not members of the Knesset at the time, they had previously been MKs for the Alignment.

^{2} Although Bar-Lev and Rabinovitz were not MKs at the time, they were later elected to the Knesset on the Alignment list.

^{3} Ofer committed suicide following the Yadlin affair.

^{4} Kol and Hausner had been elected to the Knesset on the Independent Liberals list, but resigned their seats after being appointed to the cabinet.

^{5} Hasani died in office.
