= Sixteenth government of Israel =

1974 government led by Golda Meir

Third Meir Cabinet
- 16th Cabinet of Israel

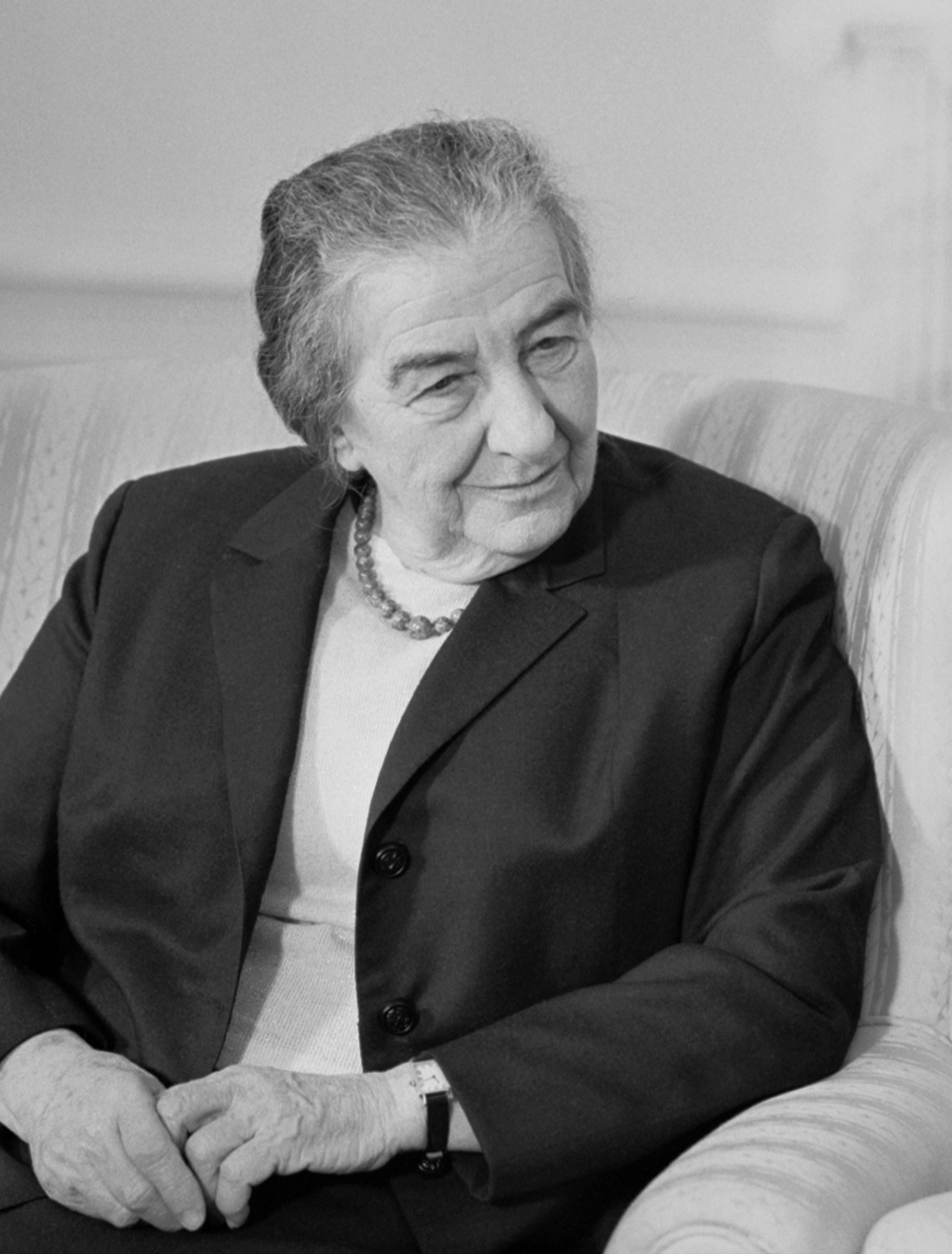
- Date formed: 10 March 1974
- Date dissolved: 3 June 1974

People and organisations
- Head of state: Ephraim Katzir
- Head of government: Golda Meir
- Member parties: Alignment; National Religious Party; Independent Liberals; Progress and Development; Arab List for Bedouin and Villagers
- Status in legislature: Coalition
- Opposition leader: Menachem Begin

History
- Election: 1973 Israeli legislative election
- Legislature term: 8th Knesset
- Predecessor: 15th Cabinet of Israel
- Successor: 17th Cabinet of Israel

The sixteenth government of Israel was formed by Golda Meir on 10 March 1974, following the December 1973 elections. However, following Meir's resignation as Prime Minister on 11 April, it only remained in office until 3 June, and at just 85 days, was the shortest-lived government in Israeli political history.

Meir's coalition consisted of only three parties; the Alignment, the National Religious Party and the Independent Liberals, although the two Israeli Arab Alignment-affiliated parties (Progress and Development and the Arab List for Bedouins and Villagers) had merged into the Alignment following the election, and held 68 of the 120 seats in the Knesset. The government initially had 22 ministers, although Minister of Welfare Michael Hasani resigned on 4 April and was not replaced. Nine of the ministers were non-Knesset members, although two of them (both from the Independent Liberals) had been elected to the Knesset in the recent election, but resigned after being appointed to the cabinet. Unlike the previous government, in which there were nine deputy ministerial portfolios, the sixteenth government had only one deputy minister, who was not appointed until 6 May.

Despite her government being praised for its administration, Meir resigned on 11 April 1974 after the Agranat Commission had published its interim report on the Yom Kippur War. The government remained in office whilst the Labor Party (the largest faction within the Alignment) elected a new leader who would attempt to form a new government. On 26 April Yitzhak Rabin, then Minister of Labour, defeated Shimon Peres, the Minister of Information, in the party's leadership contest. Rabin went on to form the seventeenth government on 3 June 1974.

Israeli government formation, March 1974
- 10 March 1974
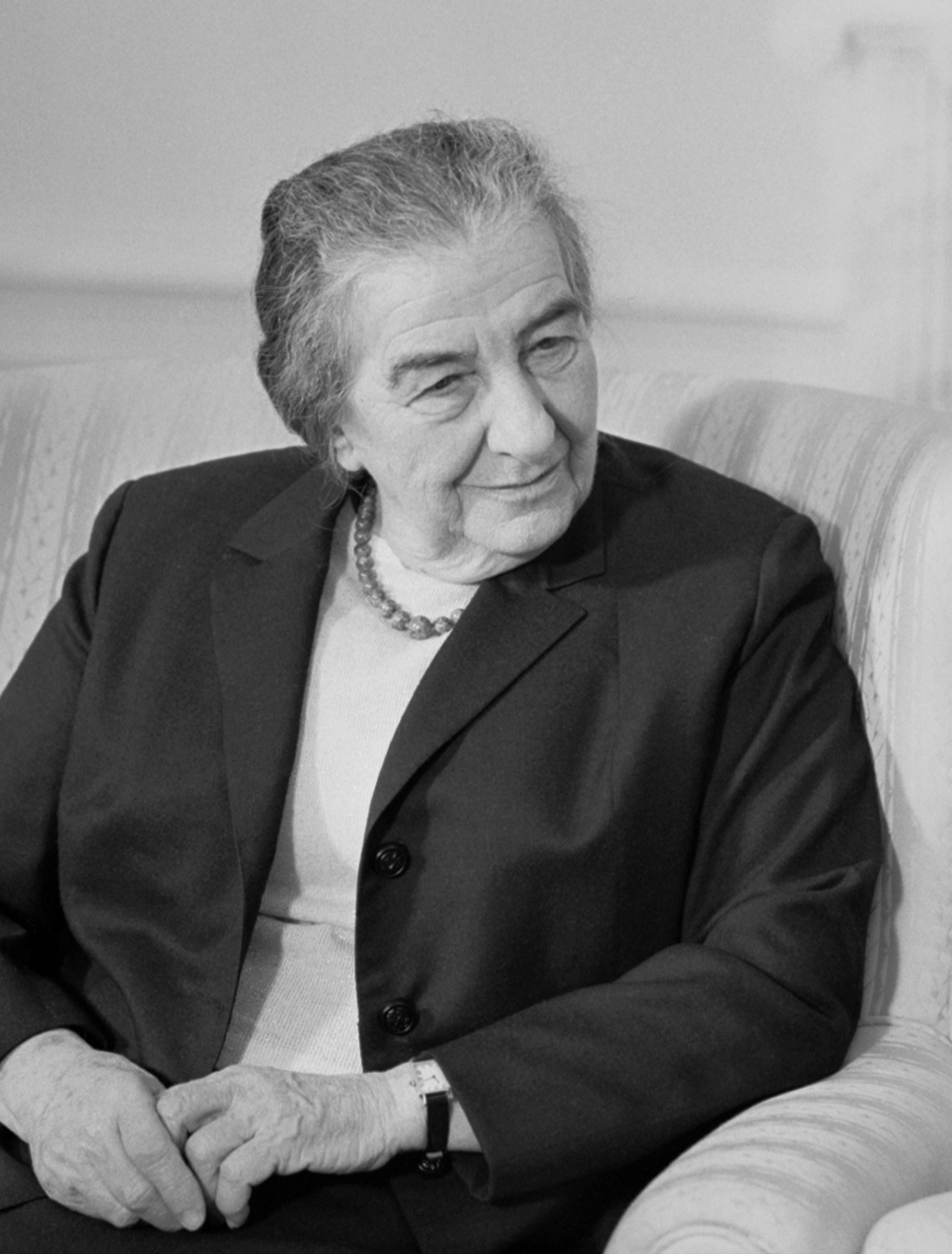

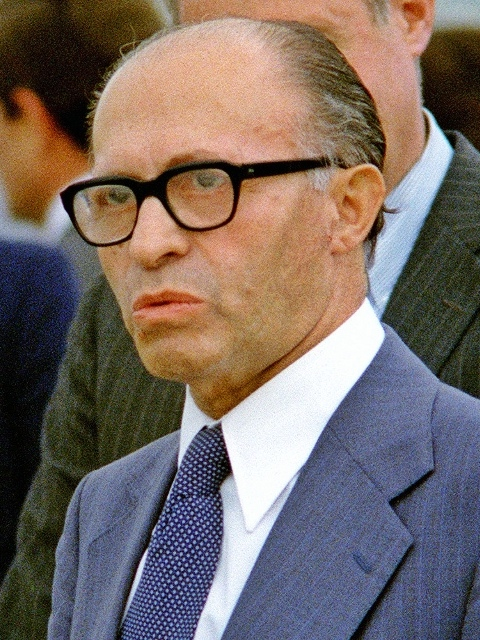
Nominee	Golda Meir	Menachem Begin
Party	Alignment	Likud
Electoral vote	68	52
Percentage	56.7%	43.3%
Prime Minister before election
Golda Meir
Alignment
Elected Prime Minister
Golda Meir
Alignment

== Cabinet members ==
Position	Person	Party
Prime Minister	Golda Meir	Alignment
Deputy Prime Minister	Yigal Allon	Alignment
Minister of Agriculture	Haim Gvati	Not an MK ^{1}
Minister of Communications	Aharon Uzan	Not an MK ^{1}
Minister of Defense	Moshe Dayan	Alignment
Minister of Development	Haim Bar-Lev	Not an MK ^{2}
Minister of Education and Culture	Yigal Allon	Alignment
Minister of Finance	Pinhas Sapir	Alignment
Minister of Foreign Affairs	Abba Eban	Alignment
Minister of Health	Victor Shem-Tov	Not an MK ^{1}
Minister of Housing	Yehoshua Rabinovitz	Not an MK ^{2}
Minister of Immigrant Absorption	Shlomo Rosen	Not an MK ^{1}
Minister of Information	Shimon Peres	Alignment
Minister of Internal Affairs	Yosef Burg	National Religious Party
Minister of Justice	Haim Yosef Zadok	Alignment
Minister of Labour	Yitzhak Rabin	Alignment
Minister of Police	Shlomo Hillel	Alignment
Minister of Religions	Yitzhak Rafael	National Religious Party
Minister of Tourism	Moshe Kol	Not an MK ^{3}
Minister of Trade and Industry	Haim Bar-Lev	Not an MK ^{2}
Minister of Transportation	Aharon Yariv	Alignment
Minister of Welfare	Michael Hasani (until 4 April 1974)	National Religious Party
Minister without Portfolio	Yisrael Galili	Alignment
Minister without Portfolio	Gideon Hausner	Not an MK ^{3}
Deputy Minister of Communications	Jabr Muadi (from 6 May 1974)	Alignment

^{1} Although Gvati, Rosen, Shem-Tov and Uzan were not members of the Knesset at the time, they had previously been MKs for the Alignment.

^{2} Although Bar-Lev and Rabinovitz were not MKs at the time, they were later elected to the Knesset on the Alignment list.

^{3} Kol and Hausner had been elected to the Knesset on the Independent Liberals list, but resigned their seats after being appointed to the cabinet.
