= Eighteenth government of Israel =

1977–81 government led by Menachem Begin

First Begin Cabinet
- 18th Cabinet of Israel

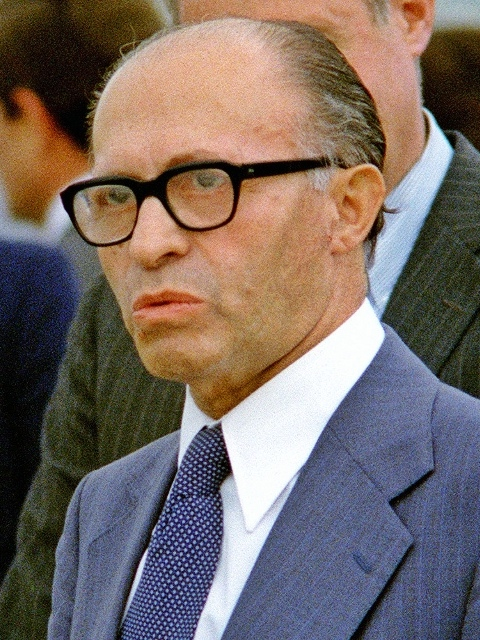
- Date formed: 21 June 1977
- Date dissolved: 5 August 1981

People and organisations
- Head of state: Ephraim Katzir (until 1978); Yitzhak Navon (from 1978)
- Head of government: Menachem Begin
- Member parties: Likud; Dash (24 October 1977–14 September 1978); Democratic Movement (from 14 September 1978); National Religious Party; Agudat Yisrael
- Status in legislature: Coalition government
- Opposition party: Alignment
- Opposition leader: Shimon Peres

History
- Election: 1977
- Legislature term: 9th Knesset
- Predecessor: 17th Cabinet of Israel
- Successor: 19th Cabinet of Israel

The eighteenth government of Israel was formed by Menachem Begin on 20 June 1977 and sworn in the next day, following the May 1977 elections. It was the first government in Israeli political history led by a right-wing party, with the coalition consisting of Begin's Likud (which included Ariel Sharon's Shlomtzion, which had merged into Likud shortly after the election), the National Religious Party and Agudat Yisrael. Begin's government also contained Moshe Dayan who had been elected to the Knesset on the Alignment's list. Following Dayan's acceptance of a place in the cabinet, he was expelled from the party and sat as an independent MK, though he only remained in the cabinet for four months.

Begin initially held four portfolios in addition to the position of Prime Minister whilst he negotiated with Dash, which had won 15 seats, making it the third largest party in the Knesset. Negotiations were concluded in October 1977, and Dash joined the government, taking the four portfolios plus a Deputy Prime Minister position (marking the first time the country had more than one Deputy PM). However, after its collapse in 1978 all its MKs except Yigael Yadin left the government.

Defense Minister Ezer Weizman lost his job in May 1980 following confrontations with Begin and Ariel Sharon. Following the 1978 South Lebanon conflict Weizman proposed forming a national unity government with the Alignment to stimulate the peace process. The idea was dismissed by Begin, leading to Weizman criticising Likud for being stubborn and uncompromising. Following a dispute with Sharon over settlements in the occupied territories, Weizman considered establishing a new party with Moshe Dayan and was expelled from Likud. After a spell out of politics, Weizman founded a new party, Yahad, and returned to the Knesset following the 1984 elections, whilst Dayan founded Telem.

Finance Minister Yigal Hurvitz also left the government following disagreements within Likud; in January 1981 he and two other MKs left Likud and set up Rafi – National List. Hurvitz later defected again to Telem.

The government was in office until 5 August 1981 when the nineteenth government took office following the 1981 elections.

== Cabinet members ==
Position	Person	Party
Prime Minister	Menachem Begin	Likud
Deputy Prime Minister	Simha Erlich	Likud
Deputy Prime Minister	Yigael Yadin (from 24/10/1977)	Dash, Democratic Movement, Independent
Minister of Agriculture	Ariel Sharon	Likud
Minister of Communications	Menachem Begin (until 24/10/1977)	Likud
Minister of Communications	Meir Amit (24/10/1977 - 15/9/1978)	Dash
Minister of Communications	Yitzhak Moda'i (15/1/1979 - 22/12/1980)	Likud
Minister of Communications	Yoram Aridor (from 5/1/1981)	Likud
Minister of Defense	Ezer Weizman (until 28/5/1980)	Likud
Minister of Defense	Menachem Begin (after 28/5/1980)	Likud
Minister of Education, Culture and Sport	Zevulun Hammer	National Religious Party
Minister of Energy and Infrastructure	Yitzhak Moda'i	Likud
Minister of Finance	Simha Erlich (until 7/11/1977)	Likud
Minister of Finance	Yigal Hurvitz (7/11/1979 - 13/1/1981)	Likud
Minister of Finance	Yoram Aridor (from 21/1/1981)	Likud
Minister of Foreign Affairs	Moshe Dayan (until 23 October 1979)	Independent
Minister of Foreign Affairs	Menachem Begin (23/10/1979 - 10/3/1980)	Likud
Minister of Foreign Affairs	Yitzhak Shamir (from 10/3/1980)	Likud
Minister of Health	Eliezer Shostak	Likud
Minister of Housing and Construction	Gideon Patt (until 15/1/1979)	Likud
Minister of Housing and Construction	David Levy (from 15/1/1979)	Likud
Minister of Immigrant Absorption	David Levy	Likud
Minister of Industry, Trade and Tourism	Yigal Hurvitz (until 1/10/1978)	Likud
Minister of Industry, Trade and Tourism	Gideon Patt (from 15/1/1979)	Likud
Minister of Internal Affairs	Yosef Burg	National Religious Party
Minister of Justice	Menachem Begin (until 24/10/1977)	Likud
Minister of Justice	Shmuel Tamir (24/10/1977 - 5/8/1980)	Dash, Democratic Movement
Minister of Justice	Moshe Nissim (from 13/8/1980)	Likud
Minister of Labour and Social Welfare	Menachem Begin (until 24/10/1977)	Likud
Minister of Labour and Social Welfare	Yisrael Katz (from 24/10/1977)	Not an MK
Minister of Religions	Aharon Abuhatzira	National Religious Party
Minister of Transportation	Menachem Begin (until 24/10/1977)	Likud
Minister of Transportation	Meir Amit (24/10/1977 - 15/9/1978)	Dash
Minister of Transportation	Haim Landau (from 15/1/1979)	Not an MK ^{1}
Minister without Portfolio	Haim Landau (until 15/1/1979)	Not an MK ^{1}
Minister without Portfolio	Moshe Nissim (10/1/1978 - 13/8/1980)	Likud
Deputy Minister in the Prime Minister's Office	Yoram Aridor (until 28/12/1980)	Likud
Deputy Minister of Defense	Mordechai Tzipori	Likud
Deputy Minister of Finance	Yehezkel Flomin (until 30/7/1979)	Likud
Deputy Minister of Industry, Trade and Tourism	Yitzhak Peretz (until 15/1/1977)	Likud

^{1} Although Landau was not an MK during the ninth Knesset, he had previously been an MK for Likud.
