= Israel–Tonga relations =

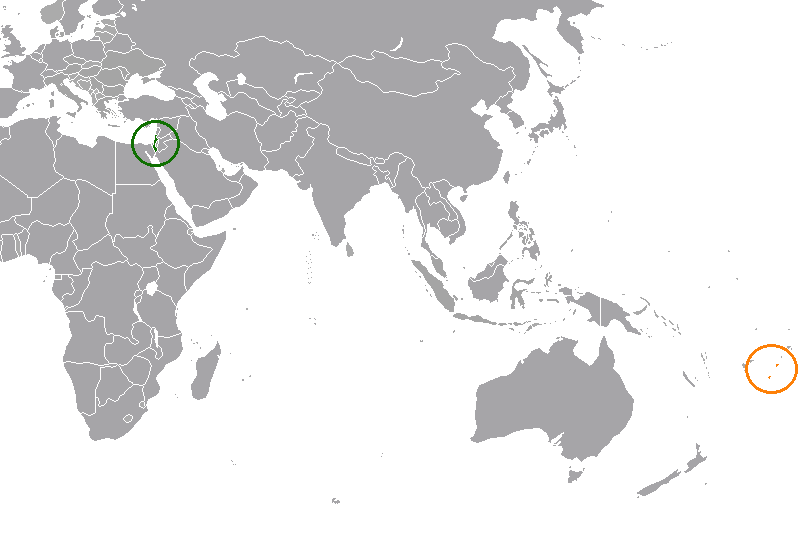

- Israel: Tonga

Israel–Tonga relations are bilateral ties between the State of Israel and the Kingdom of Tonga. Israel is accredited to Tonga from its embassy in Wellington, New Zealand. Tonga has an honorary consul in Israel named Ron Kleiman.

== History ==
The State of Israel and the Kingdom of Tonga officially established their diplomatic relations in 1977, seven years after Tongan independence. The Prince of Tonga arrived in Israel on 21 December 1980. The prince had meetings with the President of Israel, Yitzhak Navon; Minister of Foreign Affairs, Yitzhak Shamir; and Deputy Minister of Defense, Mordechai Tzipori.

On 13 September 2010, both countries signed a visa-waiver agreement.

In 2011, Shemi Tzur, the Israeli ambassador in Wellington, showed his credentials to the Tongan King. In the same year, the speaker of the Knesset, Reuven Rivlin, paid a visit to Tonga. At the end of that year, a Tongan parliamentary delegation paid a visit to Israel. In 2012, a delegation from Tonga, headed by the Tongan PM, paid a visit to Israel. The delegation met the Prime Minister Benjamin Netanyahu. The delegation also visited Hadassah Medical Center.
