= Josef Burg =

Josef (Yosef) Burg may refer to:

- Josef Burg (writer) (1912–2009), Ukrainian Yiddish writer
- Yosef Burg (1909–1999), Israeli politician
