= Abuhatzira =

Abuhatzira is a surname. Notable people with the surname include:

- Aharon Abuhatzira (1938–2021), Israeli politician
- Shimon Abuhatzira (born 1986), Israeli footballer
