= Eliyahu Moyal =

Israeli politician (1920–1991)

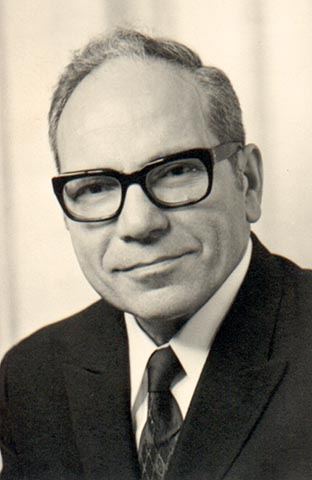
- Moyal during his time in the Knesset

Faction represented in the Knesset
- 1974–1981: Alignment

Personal details
- Born: 2 August 1920 Salé, Morocco
- Died: 6 September 1991 (aged 71)

Eliyahu Moyal (Hebrew: אליהו מויאל; 2 August 1920 – 6 September 1991) was an Israeli politician who served as a member of the Knesset for the Alignment between 1974 and 1981.

== Biography ==
Born in Salé in Morocco, Moyal became general secretary of the city's Community Council in 1941 and secretary of the All Israel are Friends association the following year. In 1945 he emigrated to Mandatory Palestine, and joined the Haganah. He joined Mapai the following year, and was arrested by the British Authorities. In 1947 he travelled to the internment camps in Cyprus as an emissary for the Jewish Agency.

In 1948 he was amongst the founders of kibbutz Bror Hayil. The following year he travelled to France and Morocco as an emissary for the Habonim movement. In 1950 he joined Kibbutz Dorot.

He studied at the Hebrew University of Jerusalem between 1952 and 1954. He then worked for Youth Aliyah movement, and taught in the Sha'ar HaNegev regional school from 1956 until 1957. In 1957 he moved to Beersheba and became secretary of Mapai's Negev branch. In 1958 he became secretary of the Beersheba Workers Council, and the following year joined Mapai's national secretariat. In 1966 he joined the Histadrut's central committee.

In 1973 Moyal was elected to the Knesset on the list of the Alignment, an alliance of the Labor Party (which Mapai had merged into in 1968) and Mapam. On 24 March 1975 he was appointed Deputy Minister of Communications in Yitzhak Rabin's government. He was re-elected in 1977, but lost his seat in the 1981 elections.

In 1982 Moyal was appointed chairman of Clalit's national board. He died in 1991 at the age of 71.
