= Ministry of Construction and Housing =

Government ministry of Israel

Ministry of Construction
- משרד הבינוי והשיכון
- Ministry emblem

Agency overview
- Formed: 1961
- Jurisdiction: Government of Israel
- Minister responsible: Haim Katz
- Website: www.moch.gov.il

The Ministry of Construction and Housing (Hebrew: מִשְׂרַד הַבִּנּוּי וְהַשִׁכּוּן, Misrad HaBinui VeHaShikun) is a portfolio in the Israeli cabinet. The ministry was created in 1961. Until 1977 and for a period from November 2014 till August 2015 it was known as the Ministry of Construction, and in 1977–2014 and from August 2015 as the Ministry of Construction and Housing (Hebrew: מִשְׂרַד הַבִּנּוּי וְהַשִׁכּוּן, Misrad HaBinui VeHaShikun). Construction was also previously part of the Labour and Construction ministry during the provisional government between 1948 and 1949.

There has been a Deputy Minister on several occasions.

The Ministry, through the Israel Land Authority, is the legal owner of the majority of land in Israel.

== List of ministers ==
#	Minister	Party	Governments	Term start	Term end	Notes
Minister of Housing
1	Giora Yoseftal	Mapai	10	2 November 1961	23 August 1962	Died in office
2	Yosef Almogi	Mapai	10, 11, 12	30 October 1962	23 May 1965	
3	Levi Eshkol	Mapai	12	31 May 1965	12 January 1966	Serving Prime Minister
4	Mordechai Bentov	Not an MK	13, 14	12 January 1966	15 December 1969	Member of Mapam
5	Ze'ev Sherf	Alignment	15	15 December 1969	10 March 1974	
6	Yehoshua Rabinovitz	Not an MK	16	10 March 1974	3 June 1974	Member of the Alignment
7	Avraham Ofer	Alignment	17	3 June 1974	3 January 1977	Died in office
8	Shlomo Rosen	Not an MK	17	16 January 1977	20 June 1977	Member of Mapam
Minister of Housing and Construction
9	Gideon Patt	Likud	18	20 June 1977	15 January 1979	
10	David Levy	Likud	18, 19, 20, 21, 22, 23	15 January 1979	11 June 1990	
11	Ariel Sharon	Likud	24	11 June 1990	13 July 1992	
12	Binyamin Ben-Eliezer	Labor Party	25, 26	13 July 1992	18 June 1996	
Minister of Housing
13	Benjamin Netanyahu	Likud	27	18 June 1996	6 July 1999	Serving Prime Minister
Minister of Housing and Construction
14	Yitzhak Levy	National Religious Party	28	6 July 1999	12 July 2000	
–	Binyamin Ben-Eliezer	One Israel	28	11 October 2000	7 March 2001	
15	Natan Sharansky	Yisrael BaAliyah	29	7 March 2001	28 February 2003	
16	Effi Eitam	National Religious Party	30	3 March 2003	10 June 2004	
17	Tzipi Livni	Likud	30	4 July 2004	10 January 2005	Acting minister until 31 August 2004
18	Isaac Herzog	Labor Party	30	10 January 2005	23 November 2005	
19	Ze'ev Boim	Kadima	30	18 January 2006	4 May 2006	
20	Meir Sheetrit	Kadima	31	4 May 2006	4 July 2007	
–	Ze'ev Boim	Kadima	31	4 July 2007	31 March 2009	
21	Ariel Atias	Shas	32	31 March 2009	18 March 2013	
Minister of Construction
22	Uri Ariel	The Jewish Home	33	18 March 2013	14 May 2015	
23	Yoav Gallant	Kulanu	34	14 May 2015	2 January 2019	
24	Yifat Shasha-Biton	Kulanu	34	9 January 2019	17 May 2020	
25	Yaakov Litzman	United Torah Judaism	35	17 May 2020	13 September 2020	
26	Yitzhak Cohen	Shas	35	14 October 2020	15 November 2020	
–	Yaakov Litzman	United Torah Judaism	35	18 November 2020	13 June 2021	
27	Ze'ev Elkin	New Hope	36	13 June 2021	29 December 2022	
28	Yitzhak Goldknopf	United Torah Judaism	37	29 December 2022	15 June 2025	
29	Haim Katz	Likud	37	15 June 2025		

=== Deputy ministers ===
#	Minister	Party	Governments	Term start	Term end
1	Moshe Katsav	Likud	20	10 October 1983	13 September 1984
2	Avraham Ravitz	Degel HaTorah	24	25 June 1990	13 July 1992
3	Aryeh Gamliel	Shas	25	29 July 1992	9 September 1993
4	Ran Cohen	Meretz	25	4 August 1992	31 December 1992
5	Eli Ben-Menachem	Labor Party	25, 26	8 April 1993	18 June 1996
6	Alex Goldfarb	Yiud, Atid	25, 26	2 January 1995	18 June 1996
7	Meir Porush	United Torah Judaism	27	24 June 1996	6 July 1999
–	Meir Porush	United Torah Judaism	29	4 June 2001	28 February 2003
–	Eli Ben-Menachem	Labor Party	30	11 January 2005	23 November 2005
8	Jackie Levy	Likud	34	14 June 2015	18 November 2018

== See also ==
- Housing in Israel
- Architecture of Israel
