= Ministry of Aliyah and Integration =

Government ministry of Israel

- משרד העלייה והקליטה
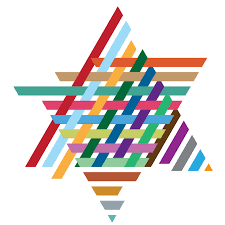

Agency overview
- Formed: 1948
- Jurisdiction: Government of Israel
- Minister responsible: Ofir Sofer
- Agency executive: Avihai Kahana, Director-General
- Website: MoAI

The Ministry of Aliyah and Integration is an Israeli cabinet-level ministry focused on the immigration of non-Israeli Jews to the State of Israel.

== Purpose ==
In coordination with local authorities and the Jewish Agency, the Ministry is responsible for helping new immigrants (olim) find employment and accommodation, and gives advice on education, planning and social issues, as well as setting up the "immigrant basket" of benefits (such as tax breaks, grants etc.).

== History ==
The ministry was known until 1951 as the Ministry of Immigration (Hebrew: משרד העלייה, Misrad HaAliya, "Ministry of Aliyah") and later renamed המשרד לקליטת העלייה, HaMisrad LeKlitat HaAliyah, "Ministry of Integration of Immigrants". Pnina Tamano-Shata, who was also the first Ethiopian Jew to serve as a minister in the Israeli government, was given the title of Minister of Immigrant Absorption when she was sworn in on 17 May 2020

In 2019 a Times of Israel investigation found that all of the success stories on the ministry's Twitter page were invented, except for one person who was not an immigrant. The ministry acknowledged the fabrication and removed them all.

== List of ministers ==
The minister is a minor portfolio in the Israeli cabinet. There is also occasionally a deputy minister.

#	Minister	Party	Government	Term start	Term end	Notes
Minister of Immigration
1	Haim-Moshe Shapira	United Religious Front	P, 1, 2	14 May 1948	8 October 1951	
Minister of Immigrant Absorption
2	Yigal Allon	Alignment	13, 14	1 July 1968	15 December 1969	
3	Shimon Peres	Alignment	15	22 December 1969	27 July 1970	
4	Natan Peled	Alignment	15	27 July 1970	10 March 1974	Not an MK
5	Shlomo Rosen	Alignment	16, 17	10 March 1974	20 June 1977	Not an MK
6	David Levy	Likud	18	20 June 1977	5 August 1981	
7	Aharon Abuhatzira	Tami	19	5 August 1981	4 May 1982	
8	Aharon Uzan	Tami	19, 20	4 May 1982	13 September 1984	
9	Ya'akov Tzur	Alignment	21, 22	13 September 1984	22 December 1988	
10	Yitzhak Peretz	Shas	23, 24	22 December 1988	13 July 1992	
11	Yair Tzaban	Meretz	25, 26	13 July 1992	18 June 1996	
12	Yuli-Yoel Edelstein	Yisrael BaAliyah	27	18 June 1996	6 July 1999	
13	Ehud Barak	One Israel	28	6 July 1999	5 August 1999	Serving Prime Minister
14	Yuli Tamir	One Israel	28	5 August 1999	7 March 2001	
15	Ariel Sharon	Likud	29	7 March 2001	28 February 2003	Serving Prime Minister
16	Tzipi Livni	Likud; Kadima	30	28 February 2003	4 May 2006	
17	Ze'ev Boim	Kadima	31	4 May 2006	4 July 2007	
18	Yaakov Edri	Kadima	31	4 July 2007	14 July 2008	
19	Eli Aflalo	Kadima	31	14 July 2008	31 March 2009	
20	Sofa Landver	Yisrael Beiteinu	32, 33	31 March 2009	10 May 2015	
21	Ze'ev Elkin	Likud	34	14 May 2015	30 May 2016	
Minister of Aliyah and Integration
22	Sofa Landver	Yisrael Beiteinu	34	30 May 2016	18 November 2018	
Minister of Immigration and Absorption
23	Benjamin Netanyahu	Likud	34	18 November 2018	24 December 2018	Serving Prime Minister
24	Yariv Levin	Likud	34	24 December 2018	9 January 2019	Acting
25	Yoav Gallant	Likud	34	9 January 2019	17 May 2020	
26	Pnina Tamano-Shata	Blue and White	35, 36	17 May 2020	29 December 2022	
27	Ofir Sofer	Religious Zionist	37	29 December 2022		

=== Deputy ministers ===
#	Minister	Party	Government	Term start	Term end
1	Aryeh Eliav	Alignment	13, 14	12 August 1968	15 December 1969
2	Shlomo Rosen	Alignment	15	20 November 1972	10 March 1974
3	Aharon Uzan	Tami	19	11 August 1981	4 May 1982
4	Marina Solodkin	Yisrael BaAliyah	28	5 August 1999	11 July 2000
5	Yuli-Yoel Edelstein	Yisrael BaAliyah	29	7 March 2001	28 February 2003
–	Marina Solodkin	Kadima	30	30 March 2005	4 May 2006
