= Ministry of Communications (Israel) =

Government ministry of Israel

- משרד התקשורת
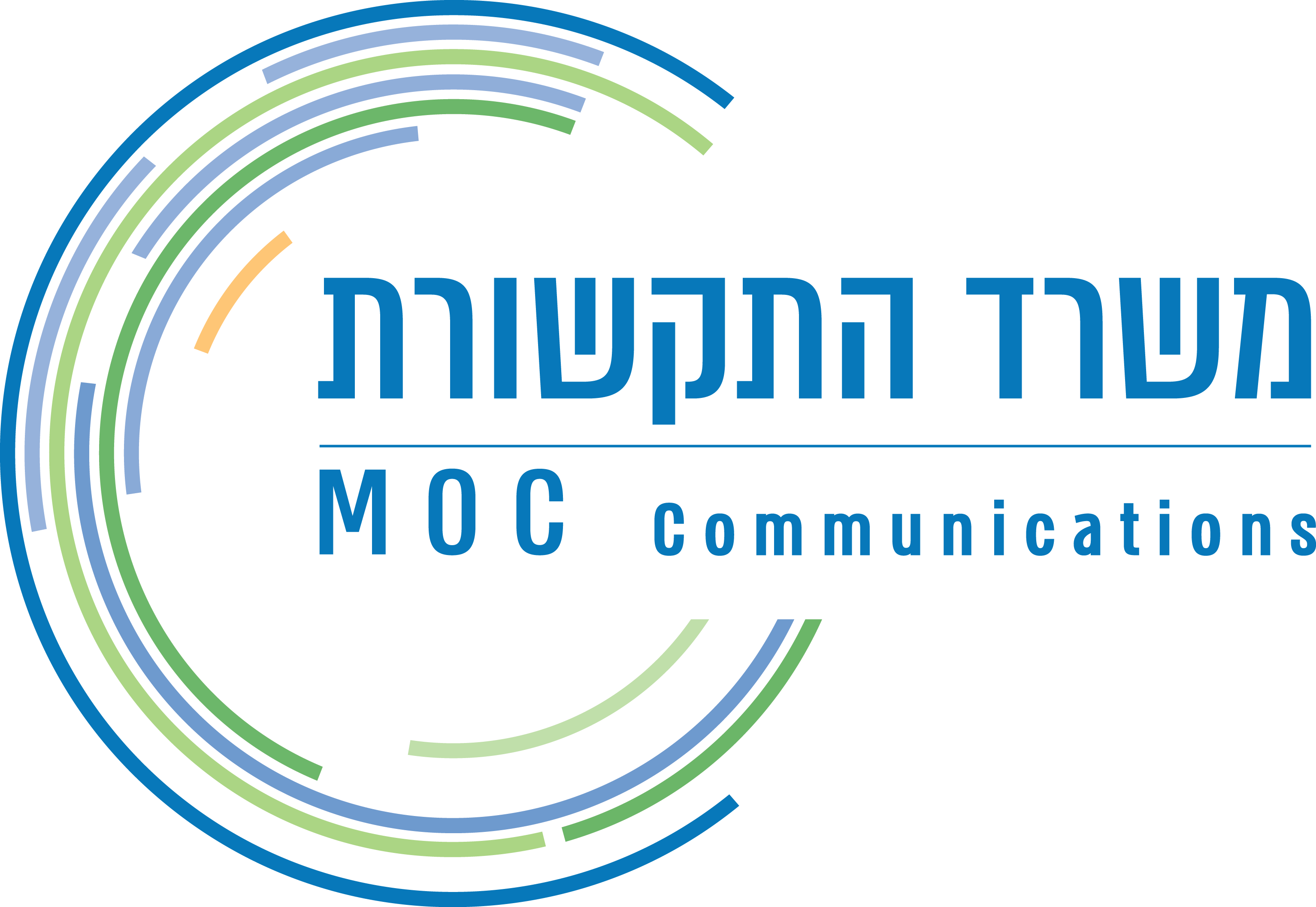
- Ministry emblem

Agency overview
- Formed: 1952
- Jurisdiction: Government of Israel
- Minister responsible: Shlomo Karhi
- Website: www.moc.gov.il

The Ministry of Communications (Hebrew: מִשְׂרָד הַתִּקְשֹׁרֶת, Misrad HaTikshoret) is the Israeli government agency responsible for regulating and overseeing communications infrastructure and services. Its primary role is to manage telecommunications, broadcasting, and postal services. The ministry was established in 1952 and was known as the Ministry of Postal Services (Hebrew: משרד הדואר, Misrad HaDo'ar) until 1970.

== List of ministers ==
The Communications Minister of Israel (Hebrew: שר התקשורת, Sar HaTikshoret) is the political head of the ministry. There is occasionally a Deputy Minister.

#	Minister	Party	Governments	Term start	Term end	Notes
Minister of Postal Services
1	Mordechai Nurock	Mizrachi	3	3 November 1952	24 December 1952	
2	Yosef Burg	Hapoel HaMizrachi; National Religious Party	4, 5, 6, 7, 8	24 December 1952	1 July 1958	
3	Yisrael Barzilai	Mapam	8	24 November 1958	17 December 1959	
4	Binyamin Mintz	Poalei Agudat Yisrael	9	17 July 1960	30 May 1961	Died in office
5	Eliyahu Sasson	Alignment	10, 11, 12, 13	2 November 1961	2 January 1967	Not an MK until after the 1965 elections
6	Yisrael Yeshayahu	Alignment	13, 14	2 January 1967	15 December 1969	
7	Elimelekh Rimalt	Gahal	15	15 December 1969	6 August 1970	
Minister of Communications
8	Shimon Peres	Alignment	15	1 September 1970	10 March 1974	
9	Aharon Uzan	Not an MK	16	10 March 1974	3 June 1974	
10	Yitzhak Rabin	Alignment	17	3 June 1974	20 March 1975	
–	Aharon Uzan	Not an MK	17	20 March 1975	20 June 1977	
11	Menachem Begin	Likud	18	20 June 1977	24 October 1977	
12	Meir Amit	Dash	18	20 June 1977	15 September 1978	
13	Yitzhak Moda'i	Likud	18	15 January 1979	22 December 1980	
14	Yoram Aridor	Likud	18	5 January 1981	5 August 1981	
15	Mordechai Tzipori	Likud	19, 20	5 August 1981	13 September 1984	
16	Amnon Rubinstein	Shinui	21, 22	13 September 1984	26 May 1987	
17	Gad Yaacobi	Alignment	22, 23	9 June 1987	15 March 1990	
18	Rafael Pinhasi	Shas	24	11 June 1990	13 July 1992	
19	Moshe Shahal	Labor Party	25	13 July 1992	7 June 1993	
20	Shulamit Aloni	Meretz	25, 26	7 June 1993	18 June 1996	
21	Limor Livnat	Likud	27	18 June 1996	6 July 1999	
22	Binyamin Ben-Eliezer	One Israel	28	6 July 1999	7 March 2001	
23	Reuven Rivlin	Likud	29	7 March 2001	28 February 2003	
24	Ariel Sharon	Likud	30	28 February 2003	17 August 2003	
25	Ehud Olmert	Likud	30	29 September 2003	10 January 2005	
26	Dalia Itzik	Labor Party	30	10 January 2005	23 November 2005	
27	Avraham Hirschson	Kadima	30	18 January 2006	4 May 2006	
28	Ariel Atias	Shas	31	4 May 2006	31 March 2009	
29	Moshe Kahlon	Likud	32	31 March 2009	18 March 2013	
30	Gilad Erdan	Likud	33	18 March 2013	5 November 2014	
31	Benjamin Netanyahu	Likud	33, 34	5 November 2014	21 February 2017	Also serving prime minister
32	Tzachi Hanegbi	Likud	34	21 February 2017	29 May 2017	Acting Minister
33	Ayoob Kara	Likud	34	29 May 2017	24 June 2019	
34	Dudi Amsalem	Likud	34	1 July 2019	17 May 2020	
35	Yoaz Hendel	Derekh Eretz	35	17 May 2020	16 December 2020	
36	Eitan Ginzburg	Blue and White	35	3 May 2021	13 June 2021	
37	Yoaz Hendel	New Hope	36	13 June 2021	29 December 2022	
38	Shlomo Karhi	Likud	37	29 December 2022		

=== Deputy ministers ===
#	Minister	Party	Governments	Term start	Term end
1	Jabr Muadi	Progress and Development, Alignment	15, 16, 17	27 October 1971	24 March 1975
2	Eliyahu Moyal	Alignment	17	24 March 1975	20 June 1977
3	Efraim Gur	Alignment	24	2 July 1990	20 November 1990
4	Yitzhak Vaknin	Shas	28	5 August 1999	11 July 2000
