= Ben-Zion Rubin =

Israeli politician (born 1939)

- בן-ציון רובין
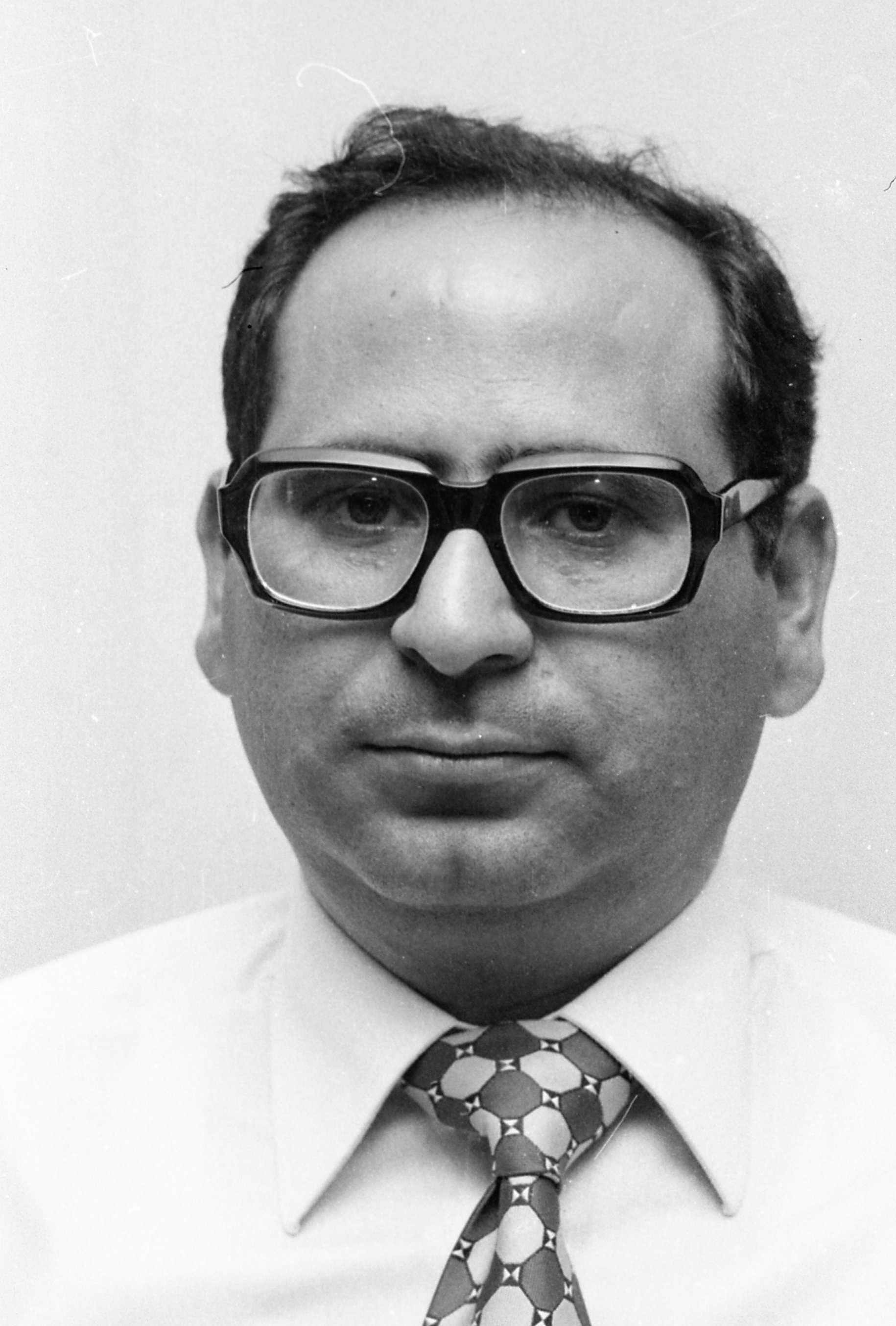
- Rubin in 1977

Faction represented in the Knesset
- 1977–1981: National Religious Party
- 1981–1984: Tami

Personal details
- Born: 6 January 1939 (age 86) Tripoli, Libya

Ben-Zion Rubin (Hebrew: בן-ציון רובין; born 6 January 1939) is an Israeli former politician who served as a member of the Knesset for the National Religious Party and Tami between 1977 and 1984.

== Biography ==
Born in Tripoli in Libya in 1939, Rubin emigrated to Israel in 1949. He studied humanities at the Hebrew University of Jerusalem, and earned a teaching certificate from the university's Education Department, going on to work as a teacher. He later also studied journalism at Tel Aviv University.

In 1961 he joined the National Religious Party, and in 1969 became a member of Netanya city council, which he remained on until 1978. Between 1969 and 1973, and again from 1974 until 1978, he served as the city's deputy mayor. In 1977 he was elected to the Knesset on the NRP list. Towards the end of the Knesset term he left the party to join Aharon Abuhatzira's breakaway faction, Tami, which was largely composed of Sephardi Jews. He was re-elected on the Tami list, and was appointed Deputy Minister of Labor and Social Welfare when Tami joined the government. He remained in government until losing his seat in the 1984 elections.
