= Moshe Baram =

Israeli politician (1911–1986)

- משה ברעם
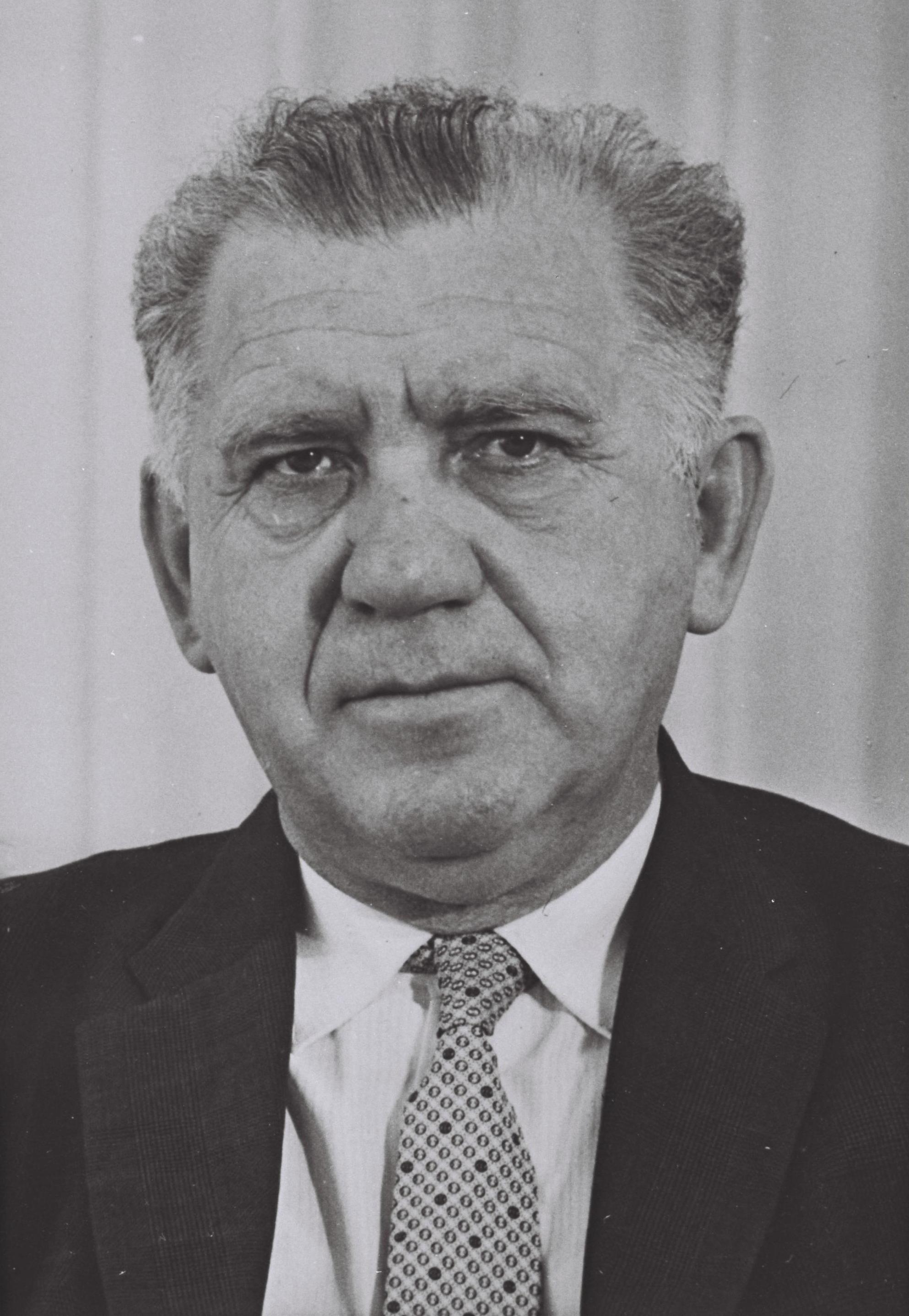

Ministerial roles
- 1974–1977: Minister of Labour
- 1977: Minister of Welfare

Faction represented in the Knesset
- 1959–1965: Mapai
- 1965–1968: Alignment
- 1968–1969: Labor Party
- 1969-1977: Alignment

Personal details
- Born: 17 March 1911 Zdolbuniv, Russian Empire
- Died: 5 December 1986 (aged 75)

Moshe Baram (Hebrew: משה ברעם; 17 March 1911 – 5 December 1986) was an Israeli politician who served as a member of the Knesset between 1969 and 1977, and also as Minister of Labour and Minister of Welfare.

== Biography ==
Moshe Baram was born in Zdolbuniv, Russian Empire (modern day Ukraine) in 1911 to Jewish parents, attending school in Kovno (now Kaunas in Lithuania). In his youth, he joined the HeHalutz Movement and "Freiheit-Dror", which was affiliated with the Poale Zion party. In 1931 he made aliyah to Mandate Palestine. After arriving in the country, he worked in the construction industry and joined the Haganah.

== Political career ==
In 1934 he began working for the Jewish Agency, and in 1938 became a member of the Secretariat of the Jerusalem Branch of Mapai, and in 1943 was made the Secretary. He also served as a delegate to the Assembly of Representatives between 1944 and 1949. In 1948 Baram was elected Secretary of the Jerusalem Workers Council, and served as a Member of the Jerusalem City Council from 1955 until 1959.

In 1959 he was elected to the Knesset on Mapai's list. In 1965 Mapai became part of the Alignment, with Baram remaining a Knesset Member until 1977. In 1974, towards the end of his political career, Baram was made Minister of Labour, also taking over the Welfare Ministry portfolio shortly before the 1977 elections. The elections saw the Alignment's parliamentary representation halved, and Baram lost his seat. However, his son, Uzi Baram did win a seat on the Alignment's list, and went on to become Minister of Tourism and Minister of Internal Affairs before retiring in 2001.

Moshe Baram is the author of the book Lo BeTelem (Not in a Furrow), published in 1981.

a street was named after him in Jerusalem
