= Ministry of Welfare and Social Affairs =

Government ministry of Israel

- משרד הרווחה והביטחון החברתי
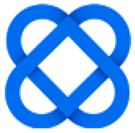
- Ministry logo

Agency overview
- Formed: 1948
- Jurisdiction: Government of Israel
- Minister responsible: Haim Katz
- Agency executive: Yinon Aaroni, Director-General
- Website: www.molsa.gov.il

The Ministry of Welfare and Social Affairs (Hebrew: משרד הרווחה והביטחון החברתי) is the branch of government charged with overseeing employment and ensuring the welfare of the public in Israel and oversee the supply of services.

== History ==
The ministry was originally divided into two separate ministries – the Labor Ministry and the Welfare Ministry. In 1977 they were united to be the Welfare and Labor Ministry according to the view that labor can lead to welfare. In the term of the second government of Ariel Sharon (2003), the responsibility of work-related issues was transferred to the Industry, Trade and Labor ministry and in 2007 the name was changed to be Welfare and Social Services Ministry. In 2016 it was changed to the current name.

== List of ministers ==
The Welfare and Social Services Minister of Israel (Hebrew: שר העבודה והרווחה, Sar HaAvoda HaRevaha) is the political head of the ministry and part of the Israeli cabinet.

#	Minister	Party	Government	Term start	Term end	Notes
Minister of Welfare
1	Yitzhak-Meir Levin	Agudat Yisrael; United Religious Front	P, 1, 2, 3	14 May 1948	18 September 1952	
2	Haim-Moshe Shapira	Hapoel HaMizrachi; National Religious Party	4, 5, 6, 7, 8	24 December 1952	1 July 1958	
3	Peretz Naftali	Mapai	8	25 January 1959	17 December 1959	
4	Yosef Burg	National Religious Party	9, 10, 11, 12, 13, 14, 15	17 December 1959	1 September 1970	
5	Michael Hasani	National Religious Party	15, 16	1 September 1970	4 April 1974	
6	Victor Shem-Tov	Alignment	17	3 June 1974	29 October 1974	
–	Michael Hasani	National Religious Party	17	30 October 1974	2 July 1975	Died in office
7	Yitzhak Rabin	Alignment	17	7 July 1975	29 July 1975	Serving Prime Minister
–	Yosef Burg	National Religious Party	17	29 July 1975	4 November 1975	
8	Zevulun Hammer	National Religious Party	17	4 November 1975	22 December 1976	
9	Moshe Baram	Alignment	17	16 January 1977	20 June 1977	
Minister of Labor and Social Welfare
10	Menachem Begin	Likud	18	20 June 1977	24 October 1977	Serving Prime Minister
11	Yisrael Katz	Not an MK	18	24 October 1977	5 August 1981	
12	Aharon Abuhatzira	Tami	18	5 August 1981	2 May 1982	
13	Aharon Uzan	Tami	19, 20	3 May 1982	13 September 1984	
14	Moshe Katsav	Likud	21, 22	13 September 1984	22 December 1988	
15	Yitzhak Shamir	Likud	23	22 December 1988	7 March 1990	
16	Roni Milo	Likud	23	7 March 1990	11 June 1990	
–	Yitzhak Shamir	Likud	24	11 June 1990	13 July 1992	Serving Prime Minister
–	Yitzhak Rabin	Labor Party	25	13 July 1992	31 December 1992	Serving Prime Minister
17	Ora Namir	Labor Party	25, 26	31 December 1992	21 May 1996	
18	Eli Yishai	Shas	27, 28	18 June 1996	11 July 2000	
19	Ra'anan Cohen	One Israel	28	10 August 2000	7 March 2001	
20	Shlomo Benizri	Shas	29	7 March 2001	23 May 2002	
21	Ariel Sharon	Likud	29	23 May 2002	3 June 2002	Serving Prime Minister
–	Shlomo Benizri	Shas	29	3 June 2002	28 February 2003	
Minister of Welfare and Social Services
22	Zevulun Orlev	National Religious Party	30	3 March 2003	11 November 2004	
23	Ehud Olmert	Kadima	31	4 May 2006	21 March 2007	Serving Prime Minister
24	Isaac Herzog	Labor Party	31, 32	21 March 2007	17 January 2011	
25	Moshe Kahlon	Likud	32	19 January 2011	18 March 2013	
26	Meir Cohen	Yesh Atid	33	18 March 2013	5 December 2014	
27	Haim Katz	Likud	34	14 May 2015	31 July 2016	
Minister of Labor, Welfare and Social Affairs
28	Haim Katz	Likud	34	31 July 2016	16 August 2019	
29	Ofir Akunis	Likud	34	20 January 2020	17 May 2020	
30	Itzik Shmuli	Labor	35	17 May 2020	3 February 2021	
31	Benny Gantz	Blue and White	35	3 February 2021	13 June 2021	
Minister of Welfare and Social Affairs
–	Meir Cohen	Yesh Atid	36	13 June 2021	29 December 2022	
32	Ya'akov Margi	Shas	37	29 December 2022	19 July 2025	
–	Benjamin Netanyahu	Likud	37	July 2025	July 2025	
34	Haim Katz	Likud	37	29 July 2025		

=== Deputy ministers ===
#	Minister	Party	Government	Term start	Term end
1	Shlomo-Yisrael Ben-Meir	National Religious Party	8	13 January 1958	1 July 1958
2	Ben-Zion Rubin	Tami	19, 20	11 August 1981	13 September 1984
3	Menachem Porush	Agudat Yisrael	21	24 September 1984	2 December 1985
3	Rafael Pinhasi	Shas	21, 22	2 December 1985	22 December 1988
4	Moshe Ze'ev Feldman	Agudat Yisrael	23	22 December 1988	31 October 1989
–	Menachem Porush	Agudat Yisrael	24	19 November 1990	13 July 1992
5	Shmuel Halpert	Agudat Yisrael	24	8 June 1991	13 July 1992
6	Yitzhak Vaknin	Shas	29	2 May 2001	20 May 2002
–	Yitzhak Vaknin	Shas	29	3 June 2002	28 February 2003
5	Avraham Ravitz	United Torah Judaism; Degel HaTorah	30	30 March 2005	4 May 2006
6	Meshulam Nahari	Shas	34	19 May 2015	13 January 2016
–	Meshulam Nahari	Shas	34	28 January 2020	6 April 2021
