= Sarah Doron =

Israeli politician (1922–2010)

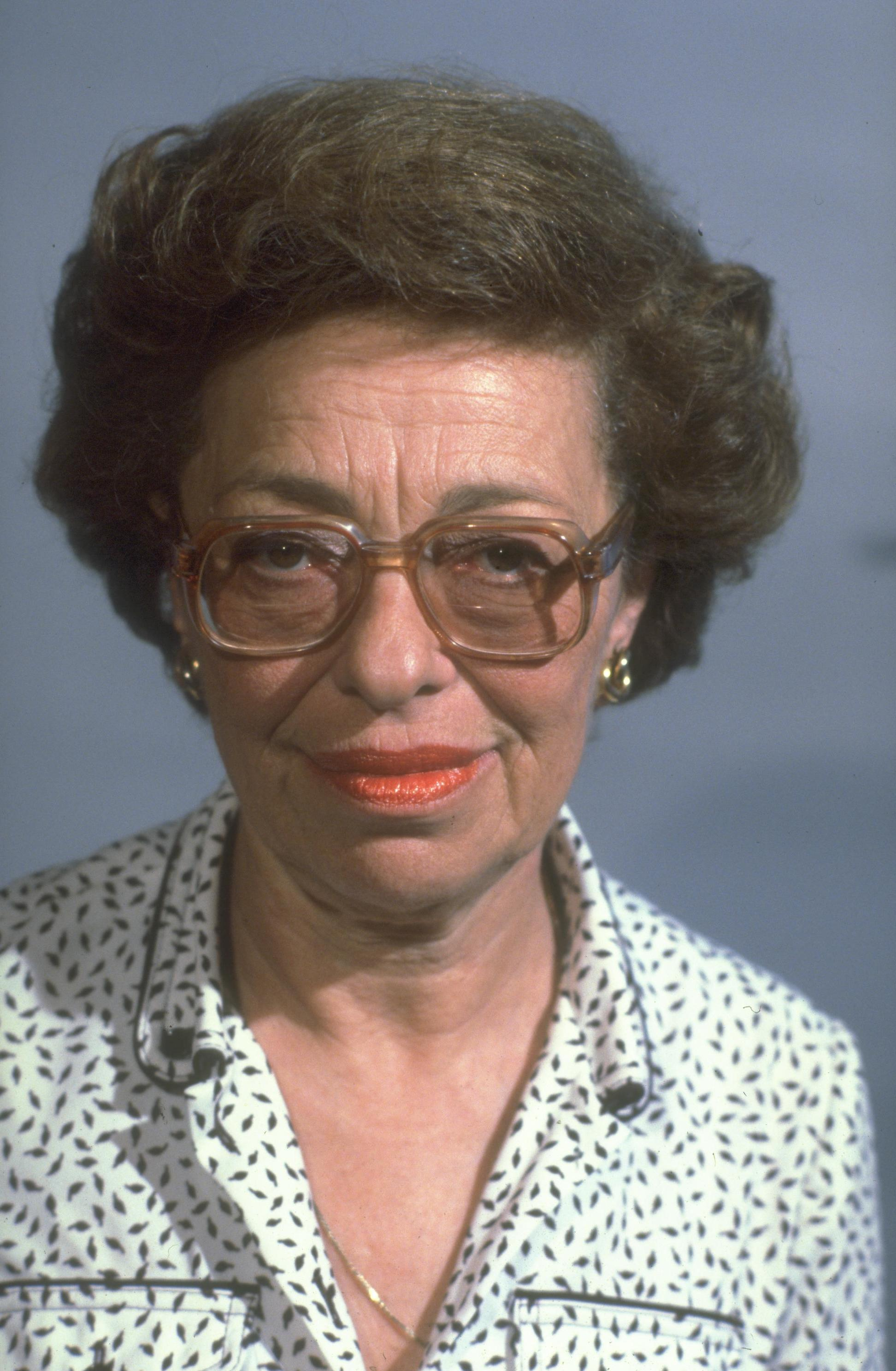
- Doron in 1981

Ministerial roles
- 1983–1984: Minister without Portfolio

Faction represented in the Knesset
- 1977–1992: Likud

Personal details
- Born: 20 June 1922; Kaunas, Lithuania
- Died: 3 November 2010 (aged 88); Israel

Sarah Doron (Hebrew: שרה דורון; 20 June 1922 – 3 November 2010) was an Israeli politician who served as a Minister without Portfolio from July 1983 until September 1984.

== Biography ==
Born in Kaunas in Lithuania, Doron emigrated to Mandatory Palestine in 1933. She attended high school in Tel Aviv, and was later elected to the city's council, where she chaired the municipal education committee.

A chairwoman of Liberal Women's Organization, she was elected to the Knesset in 1977 on Likud's list. Re-elected in 1981, she was appointed Minister without Portfolio by Menachem Begin on 5 August 1981. She remained a cabinet member when Yitzhak Shamir formed a new government in October 1983. When she joined the Begin government in 1983, Doron was the first woman in the Israeli cabinet in the nine years since Shulamit Aloni resigned in 1974.

Although Doron retained her seat in the 1984 elections, she was left out of the national unity government cabinet. She was re-elected again in 1988, but lost her seat in the 1992 elections.

Doron died on 2 November 2010 at the age of 88.
