= Haim Corfu =

Israeli politician (1921–2015)

- חיים קורפו
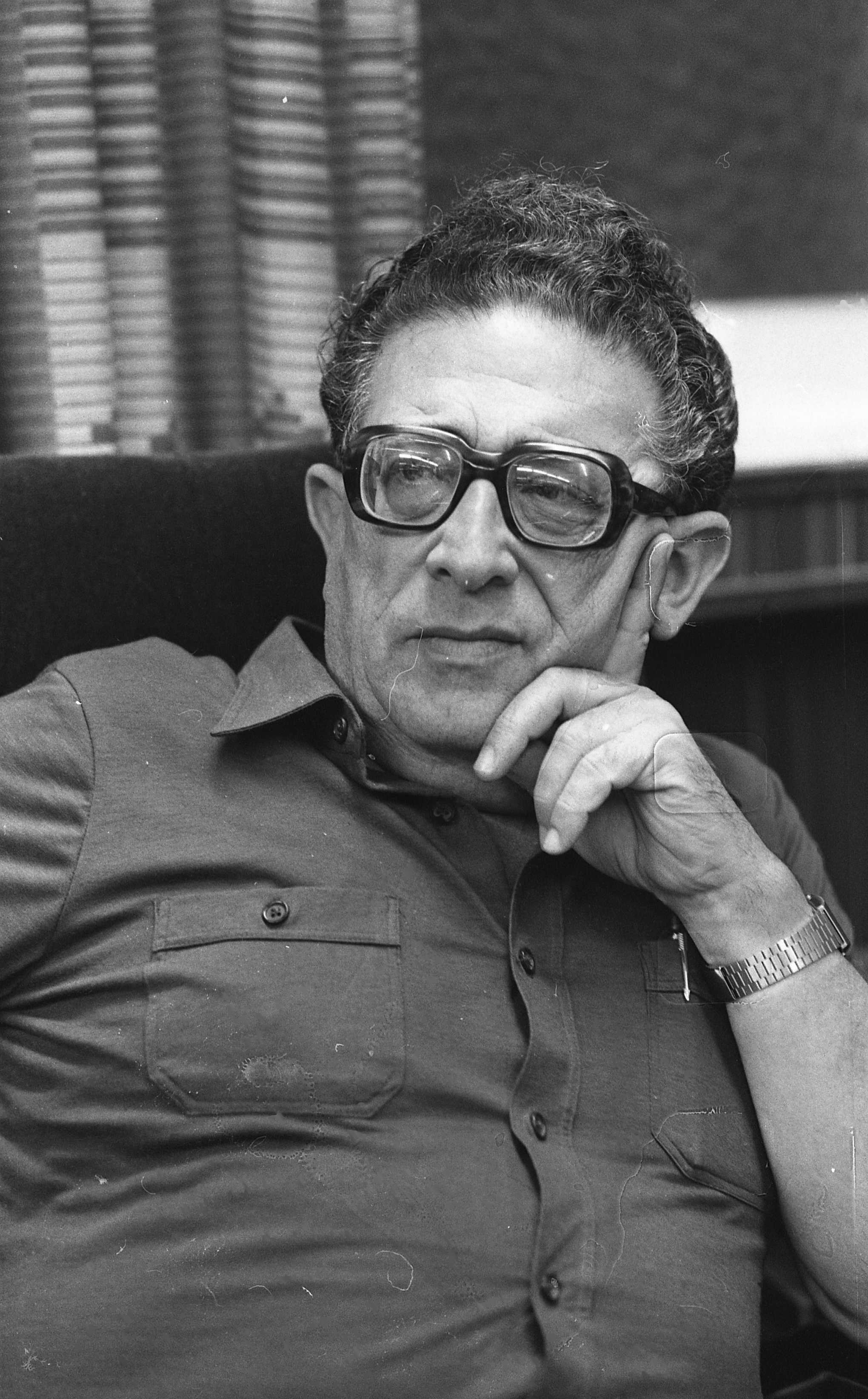
- Corfu in 1981

Ministerial roles
- 1981–1988: Minister of Transportation

Faction represented in the Knesset
- 1969–1974: Gahal
- 1974–1992: Likud

Personal details
- Born: 6 January 1921 Jerusalem, Mandatory Palestine
- Died: 23 February 2015 (aged 94) Ramat Gan, Israel
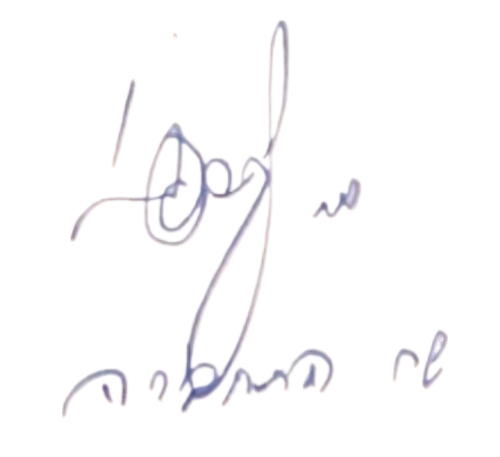
- Signature

Haim Corfu (Hebrew: חיים קורפו; 6 January 1921 – 23 February 2015) was an Israeli politician and Irgun commander.

== Biography ==
Corfu was born in Jerusalem in 1921 to an ultra-Orthodox family. He studied in religious schools and yeshivas and attended a religious teachers seminary.

In 1937 he joined the Irgun and was a member of the Irgun command in Jerusalem. During that time he also played as a striker for Beitar Jerusalem.

He used his training as an electrician to design explosives. He was responsible for the assassinations of CID officers Ralph Cairns and Ronald Barker. Corfu, observing the two while hiding behind a stonemason's shack, pressed the detonator of the remotely-controlled mine that killed them. He was in charge of bombing the income tax offices on 26 February 1944.

Corfu was subsequently interned in Sudan and Kenya by the British, where he also put his skills as an electrician to use in an attempt to escape.

After the establishment of the State of Israel he studied law at the Hebrew University of Jerusalem and was certified as a lawyer. From 1967 to 1969 he was a member of the Jerusalem city council. In 1969, he was elected to the seventh Knesset for Gahal, and was subsequently elected to the eighth through twelfth Knessets for Likud. In the seventh and eighth Knessets he was a member of the finance committee and in the eighth he was also a member of the subcommittee for the defense budget. In the ninth and twelfth Knessets he was a member of the Foreign Affairs and Defense Committee and in the twelfth he was the chairman of the house committee.

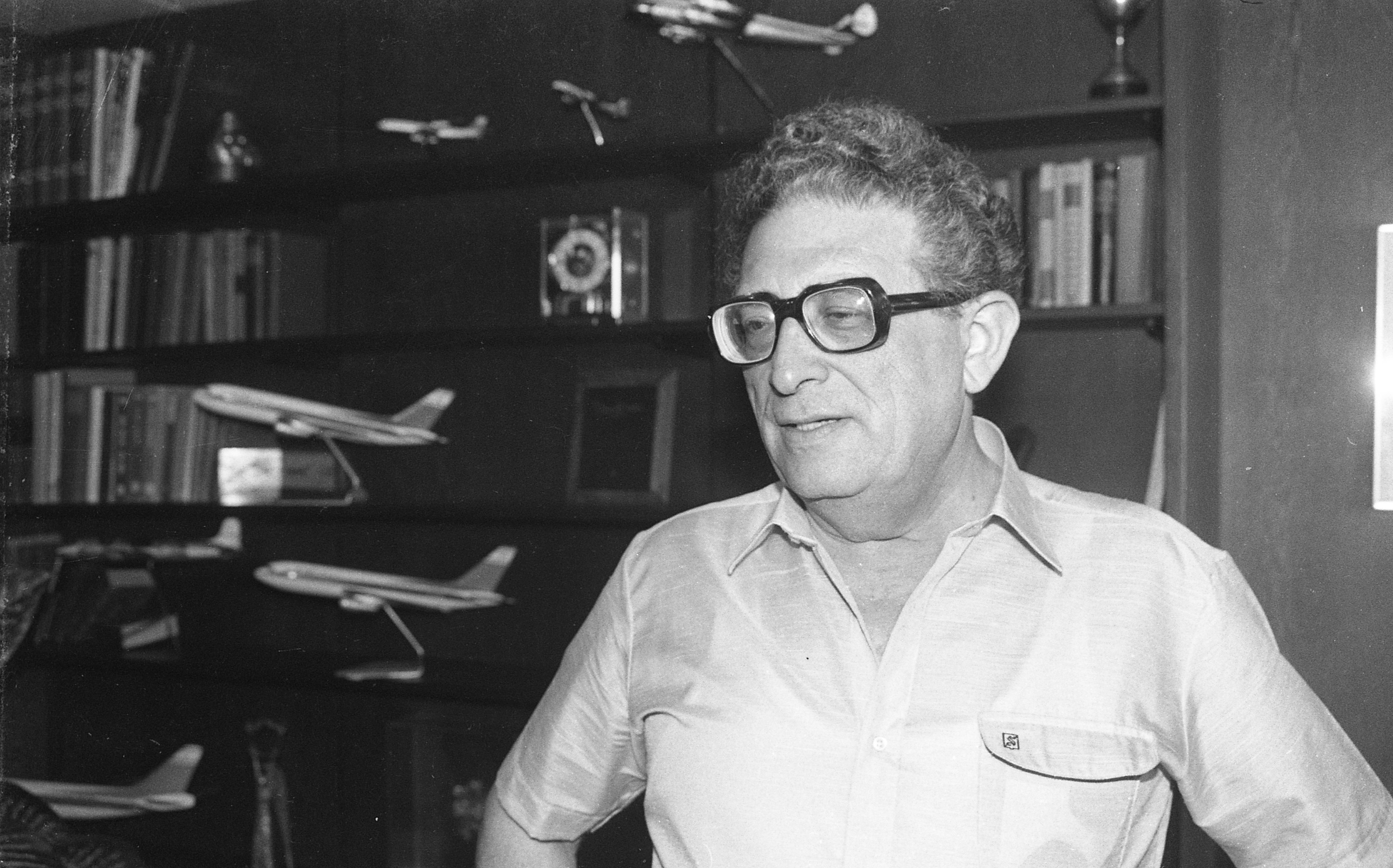
Corfu as Minister of Transportation (1982)

Between 1981 and 1988 he served as transportation minister, supporting the consolidation of Israel Railways with the Ports Authority.

In 1986, he was invited to attend a transportation convention in Morocco and thus became the first Israeli cabinet member to be asked to attend a conference in an Arab country other than Egypt. In 1987, he voted for a bill to grant a blanket amnesty to the Jewish Underground prisoners. In April 1992 he resigned from the Knesset to become chairman of the Israeli Airports Authority, a position he held until 1996.

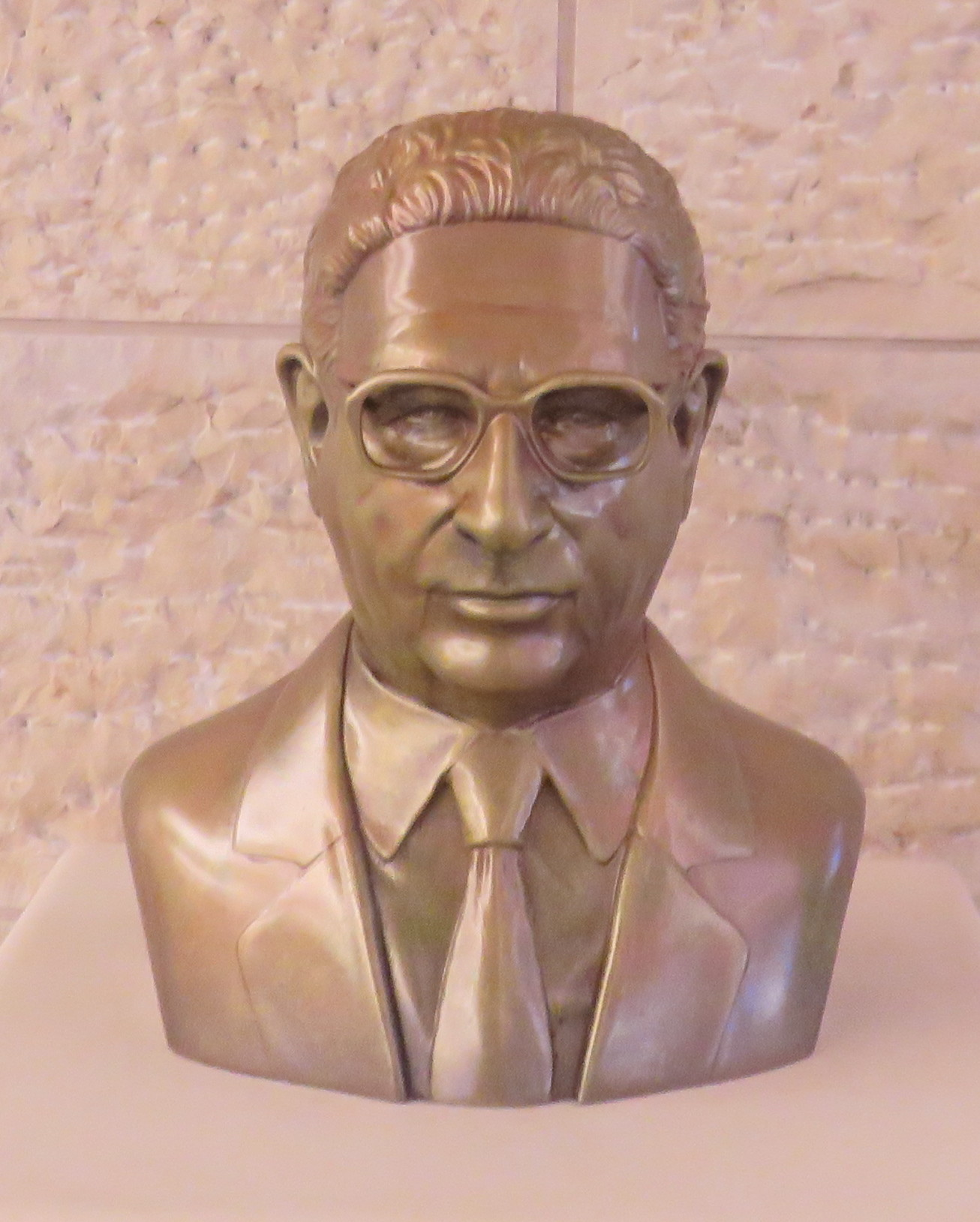
Bust of Corfu at Ben-Gurion Airport
