= Michael Hasani =

Israeli politician (1913–1975)

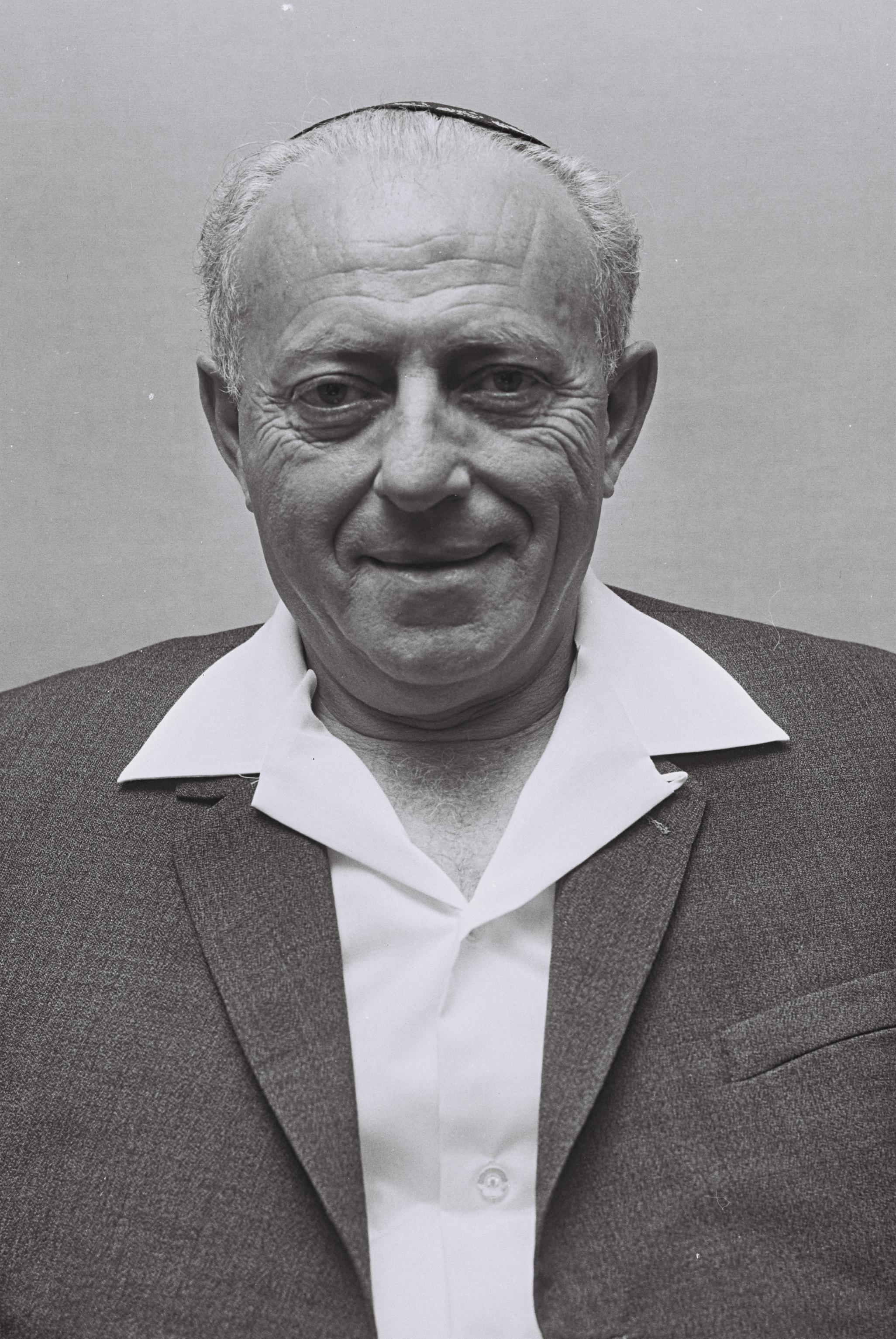
- Hasani in 1970

Ministerial roles
- 1970–1974: Minister of Welfare
- 1974–1975: Minister of Welfare

Faction represented in the Knesset
- 1951–1955: Hapoel HaMizrachi
- 1955–1975: National Religious Party

Personal details
- Born: 12 June 1913 Bendzin, Russian Empire
- Died: 2 July 1975 (aged 62)

Rabbi Ya'akov-Michael Hasani (Hebrew: יעקב-מיכאל חזני; 27 June 1913 – 2 July 1975) was an Israeli politician who served as Minister of Welfare during two spells in the early 1970s.

== Biography ==
Born Ya'akov Kantrovich in Będzin in Poland (Russian Empire), Hasani studied at a yeshiva and was certified as a rabbi. He immigrated to Palestine in 1932 and was involved in the Haganah.

In 1951 he was elected to the Knesset on the Hapoel HaMizrachi list. He was re-elected in 1955, 1959 (by which time the party had merged into the National Religious Party), 1961, 1965 and 1969. In December 1969 he became Deputy Minister of Education and Culture, serving until 1 September 1970, when he was appointed Minister of Welfare. He remained minister After the 1973 elections, he retained his seat in the Knesset and continued in office as Minister of Welfare. However, less than a month after the government was formed, Hasani left the cabinet on 4 April 1974. He returned as Minister of Welfare in October that year, serving until his death in July 1975.
