= Aharon Abuhatzira =

Israeli politician (1938–2021)

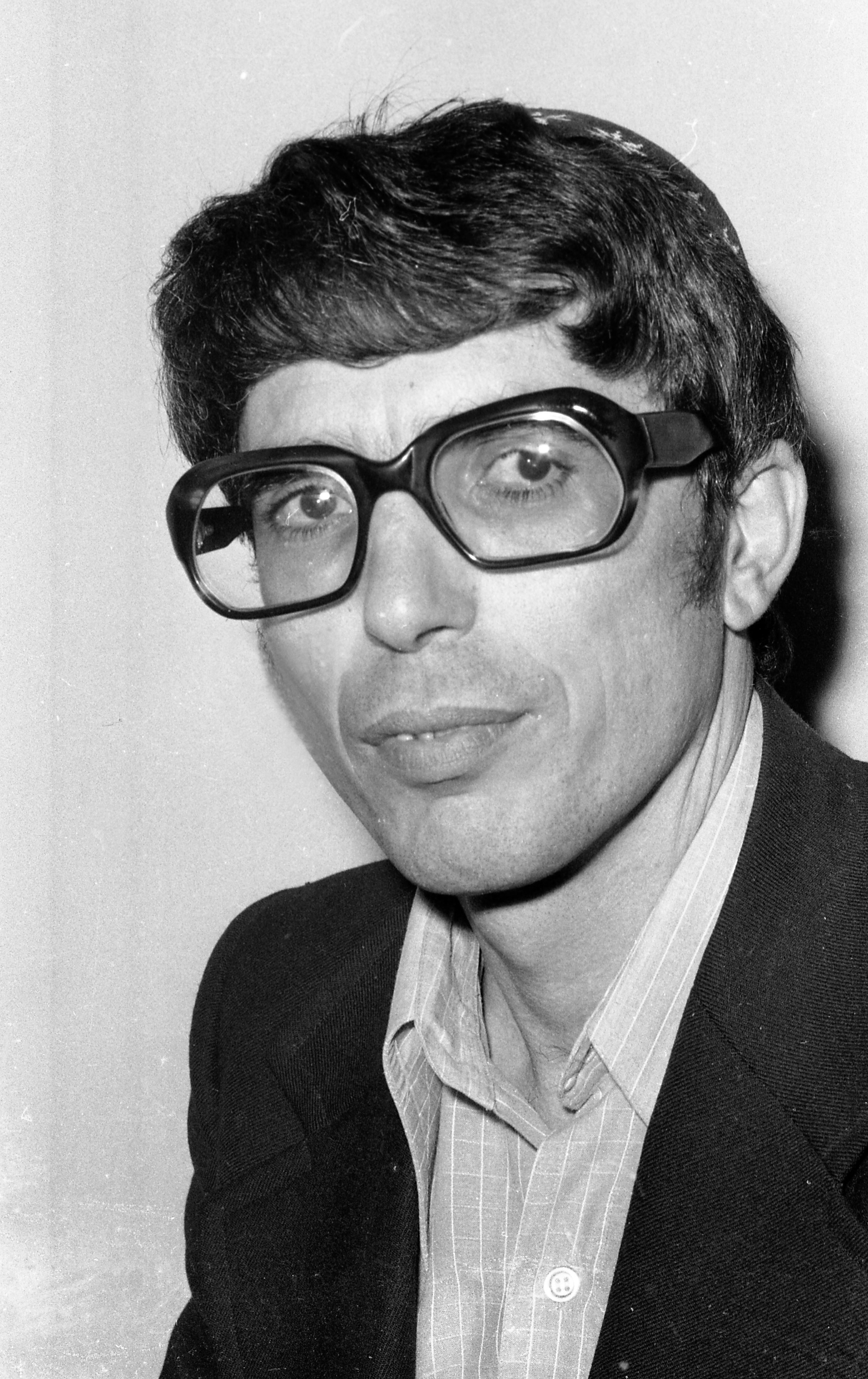
- Abuhatzira in 1977

Ministerial roles
- 1977–1981: Minister of Religions
- 1981–1982: Minister of Immigrant Absorption
- 1981–1982: Minister of Labor & Social Welfare

Faction represented in the Knesset
- 1977–1981: National Religious Party
- 1981–1988: Tami
- 1988–1992: Likud

Personal details
- Born: 28 October 1938 Erfoud, Morocco
- Died: 21 September 2021 (aged 82)

Aharon Abuhatzira (Hebrew: אהרן אבוחצירא; 28 October 1938 – 21 September 2021) was an Israeli politician. After serving as mayor of Ramla, he held several ministerial portfolios in the late 1970s and early 1980s. He resigned from the cabinet after being convicted of larceny, breach of trust and fraud.

== Biography ==
Aharon Abuhatzira was born in the Tafilalt region of Morocco and made aliyah to Israel in 1949. He studied the Kfar HaRoeh Yeshiva, graduated from a Teachers' Seminary in Jerusalem and earned a BA from Bar-Ilan University. Before entering politics, he worked as a high school teacher.

== Political career ==
Abuhatzira was elected to Ramla city council in 1969 and became mayor of the city in 1972. He was elected to the Knesset in 1977 on the National Religious Party's list, and was appointed Minister of Religions in Menachem Begin's government. Abuhatzira left the NRP and formed his own party, Tami. The party won three seats in the 1981 elections and was included in Begin's new government. Abuhatzira was appointed both Minister of Immigrant Absorption and Minister of Labor and Social Welfare. Abuhatzira was re-elected in the 1984 elections, but his party won only one seat. Towards the end of the Knesset term he merged the party into Likud, and in the 1988 elections, won a seat on the Likud list, but failed to retain it in the 1992 vote.

In June 1980 Israel Police began investigating claims that Abuhatzira had received 52,500 shekels from religious institutions in 1978 and 1979 for giving funds to non-existent yeshivas. Although he denied the allegations, stating that they were "provocation and a libel", in December 1980 Attorney General Yitzhak Zamir requested that the Knesset lift Abuhatzira's parliamentary immunity so that he could be charged with bribery. On 13 January 1981 the Knesset plenum voted to remove his parliamentary immunity. After being found guilty on 19 April 1982, he resigned from the cabinet on 30 April, after which fellow Tami MK Aharon Uzan took over his portfolios. He was sentenced to a suspended sentence of four years and three months; thirty months for larceny, eighteen months for breach of trust and fraud by an administrator, and three months for breach of trust by a public servant.

== See also ==
- List of Israeli public officials convicted of crimes or misdemeanors
