= Shlomo Rosen =

Israeli politician (1905–1985)

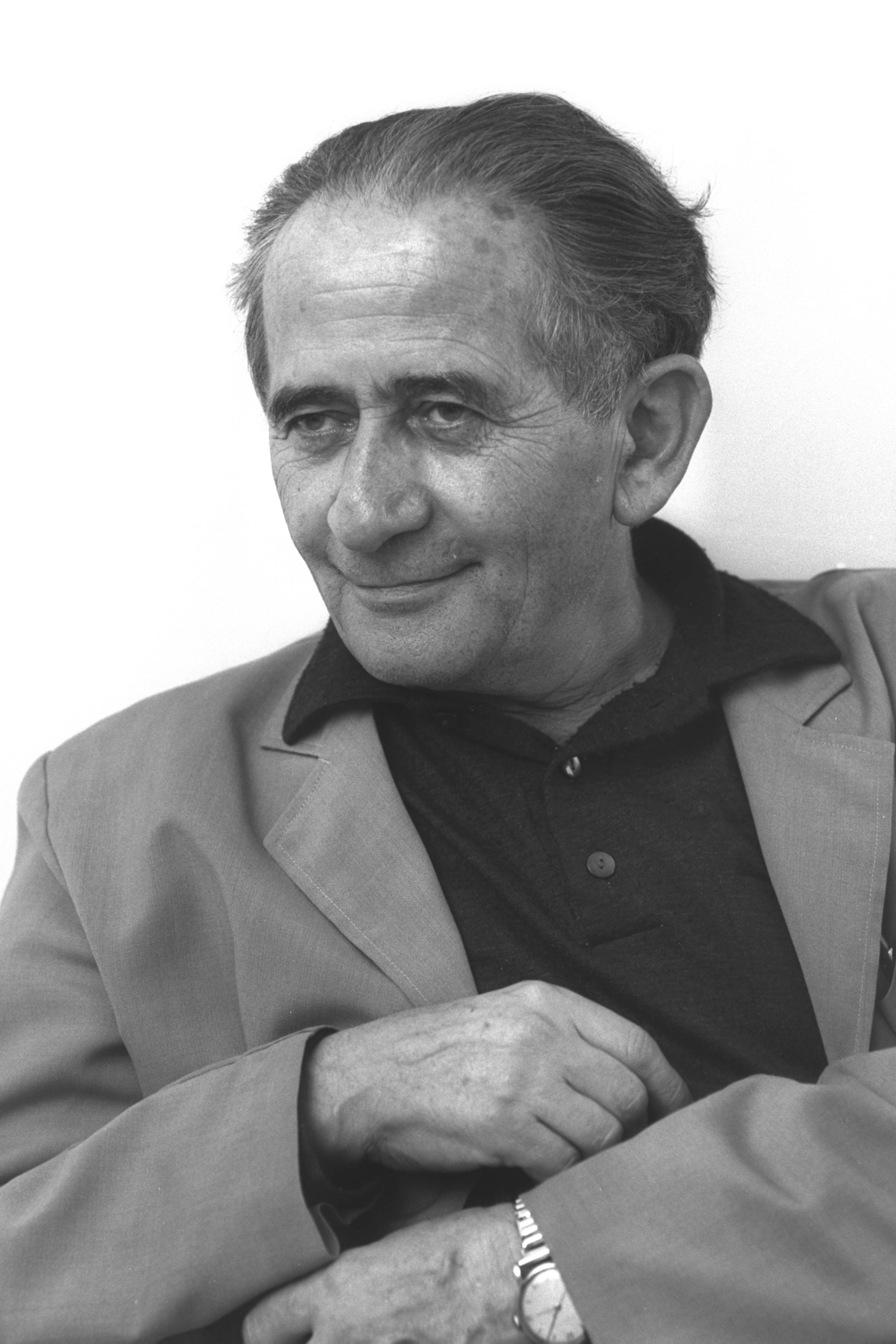
- Rosen in 1965

Ministerial roles
- 1974–1977: Minister of Immigrant Absorption
- 1977: Minister of Housing

Faction represented in the Knesset
- 1965–1969: Mapam
- 1969–1974: Alignment

Personal details
- Born: 21 June 1905; Moravská Ostrava, Austria-Hungary
- Died: 7 December 1985 (aged 80)

Shlomo Rosen (Hebrew: שלמה רוזן; 21 June 1905 – 7 December 1985) was an Israeli politician and minister.

Born in Moravská Ostrava in Austria-Hungary (now in the Czech Republic), Rosen emigrated to Mandatory Palestine in 1926. He joined kibbutz Sarid the following year. Between 1933 and 1935 he returned to Ostrava to serve as an emissary for Hashomer Hatzair. After returning home, he worked for the Kibbutz Artzi movement, later serving as its secretary.

In the 1965 elections he was voted into the Knesset on Mapam's list. After Mapam merged into the Alignment, he was re-elected in 1969. Following the election, he became Deputy Speaker of the Knesset, and in November 1972 was appointed Deputy Minister of Immigrant Absorption. Although he lost his seat in the 1973 elections, he was appointed Minister of Immigrant Absorption by Golda Meir when she formed the new government. He retained the portfolio when Yitzhak Rabin took over as prime minister, and was appointed Minister of Housing in January 1977. He lost both portfolios when Menachem Begin formed the next government in June that year.
