= Tami (political party) =

Tami תנועת מסורת ישראל
- Leader: Aharon Abuhatzira
- Split from: National Religious Party
- Merged into: Likud
- Ideology: Mizrahi interests
- Most MKs: 3 (1981)

Election symbol
- ני

Tami (Hebrew: תמ״י, an acronym for Tnu'at Masoret Yisrael תנועת מסורת ישראל, lit. Movement for the Heritage of Israel) was a short-lived Mizrahi Jewish-dominated political party in Israel during the 1980s. It was led by Aharon Abuhatzira for its entire existence.

== Background ==
Tami was founded shortly before the 1981 elections when Minister of Religions and former Ramla Mayor Aharon Abuhatzira broke away from the National Religious Party after they failed to prevent his being stripped of his parliamentary immunity and put on trial.

Campaigning on a platform of equality for all citizens regardless of religion, ethnic background, or nationality, Tami won three seats, taken by Abuhatzira, President of Sephardi Federation of Israel and former Mapai and Alignment MK and Minister Aharon Uzan, and another former NRP member, Ben-Zion Rubin. Tami was invited into Menachem Begin's coalition government alongside Likud, the National Religious Party, Agudat Israel, Telem, and later Tehiya. Abuhatzira was appointed Minister of Labor and Social Welfare and Minister of Immigrant Absorption, but resigned from both positions in April 1982 after being convicted of larceny, breach of trust, and fraud, handing over both positions to Uzan.

The party performed poorly in the 1984 elections, losing many of its voters to the new Sephardic party Shas, and won only one seat, taken by Abuhatzira. It merged into the Likud during the Knesset session and ceased to exist.

== Election results ==
Election	Leader	Votes	%	Seats	+/–	Status
1981	Aharon Abuhatzira	44,466	2.3 (#8)	3 / 120	New	Coalition
1984	Aharon Abuhatzira	31,103	1.5 (#13)	1 / 120	▼2	Opposition

== Knesset members ==
Knesset (MKs)	Knesset Members
10th (3)	Aharon Abuhatzira, Ben-Zion Rubin, Aharon Uzan
11th (1)	Aharon Abuhatzira
