= Mordechai Tzipori =

Israeli politician (1924–2017)

- מרדכי צפורי
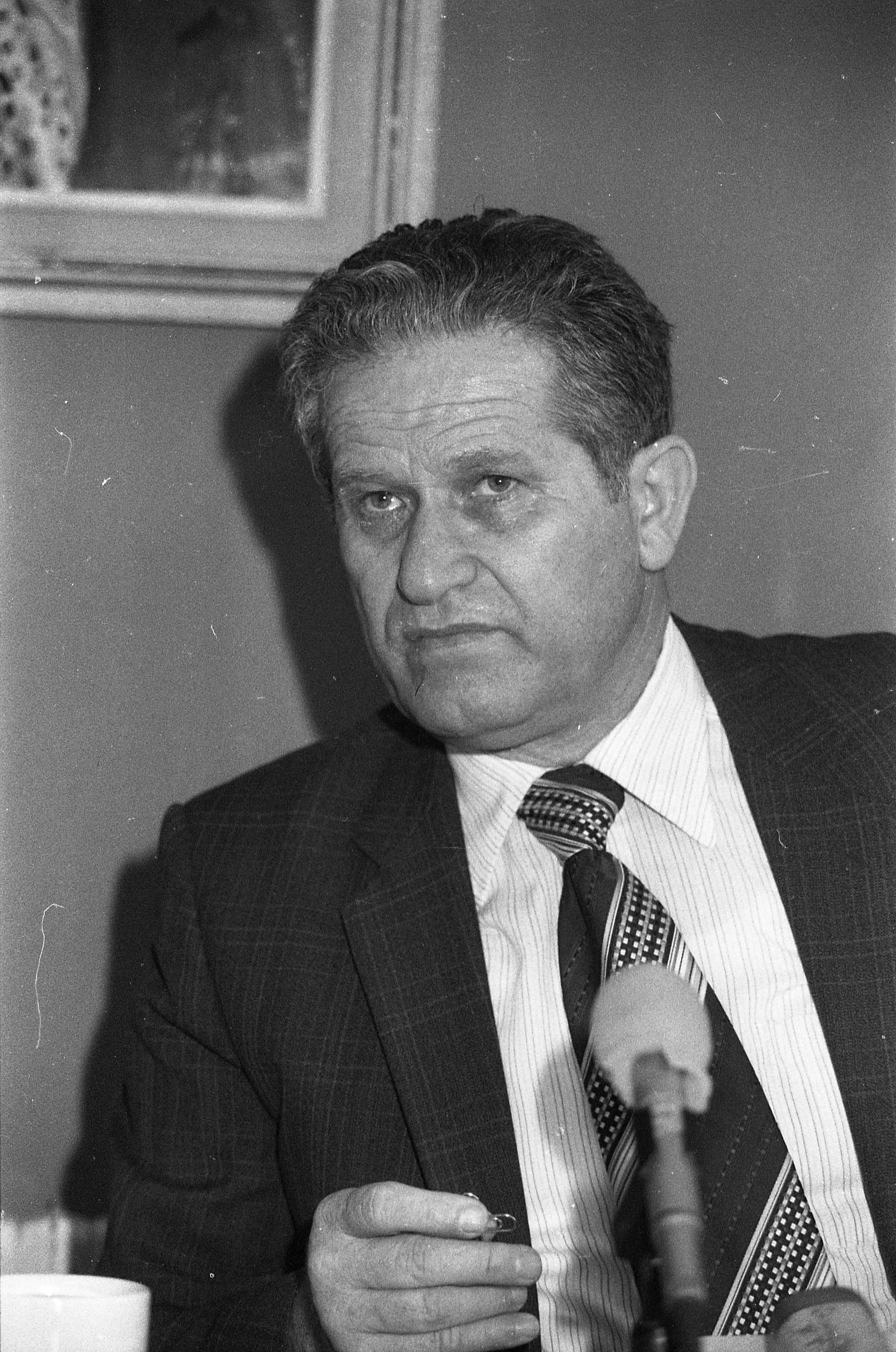
- Tzipori in 1983

Ministerial roles
- 1981–1984: Minister of Communications

Faction represented in the Knesset
- 1977–1984: Likud

Personal details
- Born: 15 September 1924; Petah Tikva, Mandatory Palestine
- Died: 29 May 2017 (aged 92); Ramat Gan, Israel

Mordechai Tzipori (Hebrew: מרדכי צפורי; 15 September 1924 – 29 May 2017) was an Israeli politician who served as Minister of Communications from 1981 until 1984.

== Biography ==
Born Mordechai Bankovich-Hendin in Petah Tikva during the Mandate era, Tzipori attended a religious school in his hometown. In 1939 he joined the Irgun, and in 1945 was arrested by the British authorities and exiled to Africa. He was interned in British detention camps in Eritrea, Kenya and Sudan, where he was involved in digging escape tunnels.

He was sent back to Israel after its independence in 1948, and became a professional soldier, serving in the IDF from 1948 until 1976. He completed an officer's course in 1950, graduated from the IDF Command and Staff College in 1959, and studied at Tel Aviv University.

Between 1962 and 1965 he was an armoured battalion commander, in 1968 he became commander of the Armour School, and deputy commander of the Armour Corps in 1971. In 1973 he was appointed Commander of Command and Staff, becoming Deputy Head of Operations in the General Staff in 1974. He was demobilised in 1976 with the rank of «Tat aluf» (Brigadier general).

The following year he was elected to the Knesset on Likud's list, and in June 1977 was appointed Deputy Minister of Defence. Following the 1981 elections he became Minister of Communications, also serving as Deputy Defence Minister between August 1981 and October 1983. He lost his seat and place in the cabinet in the 1984 elections. In the late 1980s he became Director-General of the National Insurance Institution.

Tzipori died aged 92 at the Sheba Medical Center in the Tel HaShomer neighbourhood of Ramat Gan on 29 May 2017.
