= Aharon Uzan =

Israeli politician (1924–2007)

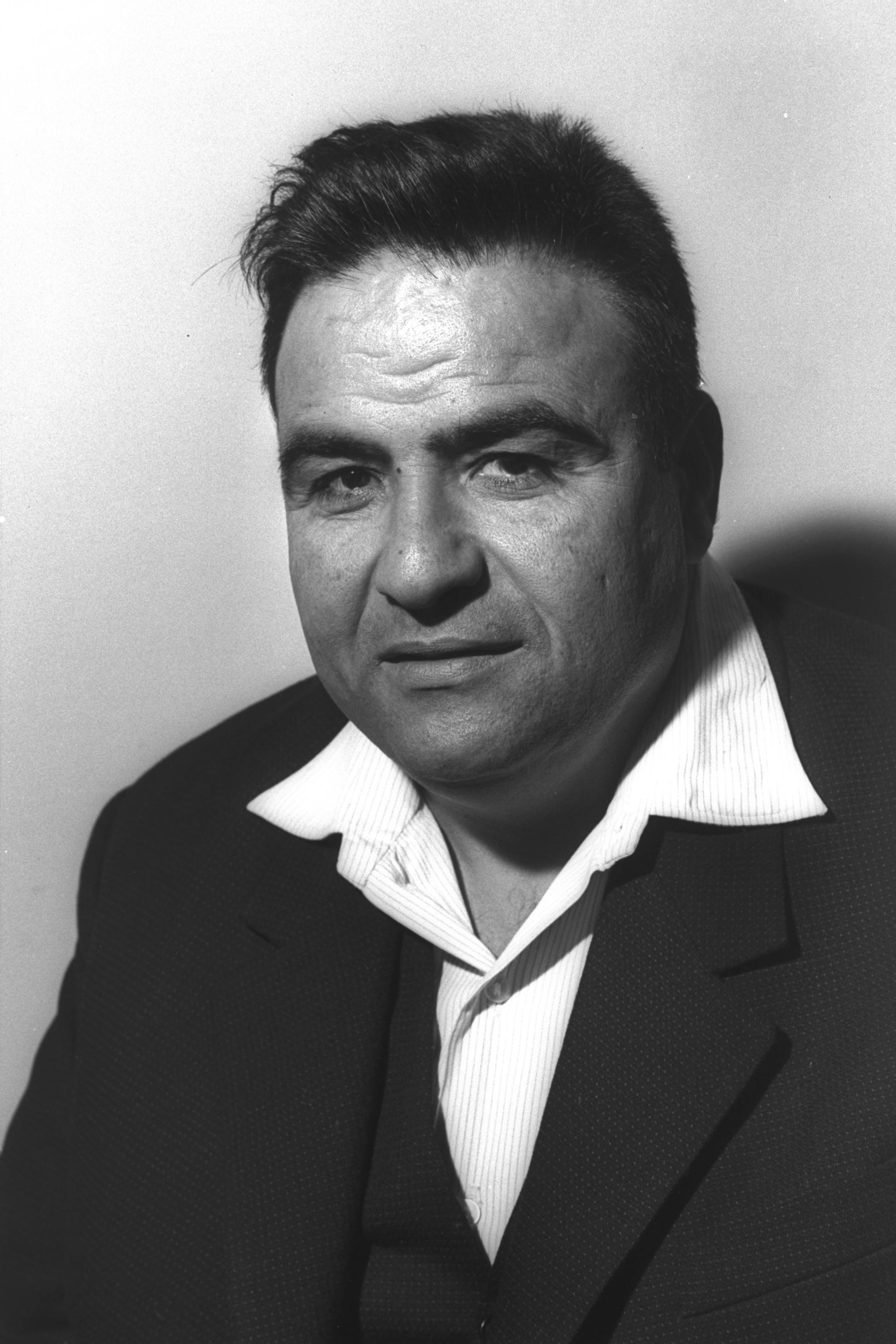
- Uzan in 1966

Ministerial roles
- 1974: Minister of Communications
- 1974–1977: Minister of Agriculture
- 1975–1977: Minister of Communications
- 1982–1984: Minister of Immigrant Absorption
- 1982–1984: Minister of Labor & Social Welfare

Faction represented in the Knesset
- 1965–1968: Alignment
- 1968–1969: Labor Party
- 1969: Alignment
- 1981–1984: Tami

Personal details
- Born: 1 November 1924 Moknine, Tunisia
- Died: 23 January 2007 (aged 82)

Aharon Uzan (Hebrew: אהרן אוזן; 1 November 1924 – 23 January 2007) was an Israeli politician who held several ministerial portfolios between the mid-1960s and mid-1980s.

== Biography ==
Uzan was born in Moknine in Tunisia, and was a member of the right-wing Betar movement in his youth. After attending college in Sousse and subsequently moving to France, he emigrated to Israel in 1949, where he underwent agricultural training and joined the left-wing Mapai party. He was one of the founding members of moshav Gilat, where he would live for the rest of his life. He served as the moshav's secretary and treasurer between 1952 and 1959. In 1960 he founded the Negev Moshav Purchasing Company, and managed it until 1968. He also founded the Negev Water and Merhav transport companies.

In 1965 he was elected to the Knesset on the Alignment's list (an alliance of Mapai and Ahdut HaAvoda), and was appointed Deputy Minister of Agriculture in January 1966, a role he held until he lost his seat in the 1969 elections.

In 1970, his son Shlomo, who served in the Israeli Navy, was killed in the War of Attrition. The Magen Shlomo Synagogue that was later built in Gilat was named for him.

Between 1970 and 1973 he was secretary of the Moshavim Movement. Despite not being a Knesset member, he returned to the cabinet in 1974 when he was appointed Minister of Communications. After Golda Meir resigned and Yitzhak Rabin formed a new government later in the year, he became Minister of Agriculture. In March 1975 he regained the Communications portfolio in addition to the Agriculture post. Following Likud's victory in the 1977 elections he lost his cabinet position.

In 1981 he left Mapai to found the new Tami party alongside Aharon Abuhatzira. The party won three seats and was included in Menachem Begin's government. Uzan was made Deputy Minister of Immigrant Absorption in July that year. In May 1982 he became both Minister of Immigrant Absorption and Minister of Labor and Social Welfare after Abuhatzira resigned from both posts following his conviction for larceny, breach of trust and fraud. He held both posts until the 1984 elections, in which he lost his seat.

Uzan was a member of the executive at Yad Levi Eshkol.
