= Yosef Burg =

Israeli politician (1909–1999)

Joseph Burg
- יוסף בורג
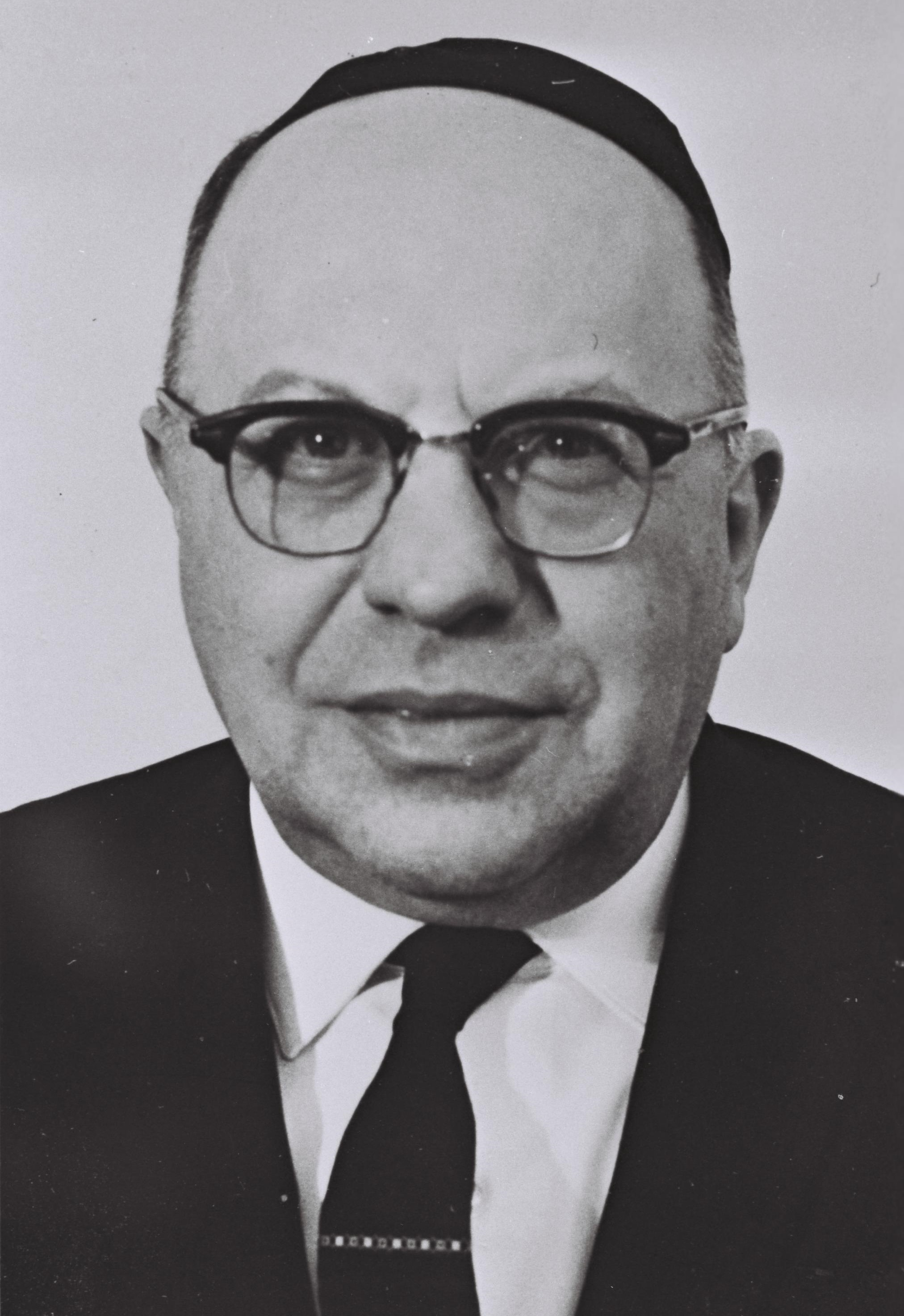

Ministerial roles
- 1951–1952: Minister of Health
- 1952–1958: Minister of Postal Services
- 1959–1970: Minister of Welfare
- 1970–1974: Minister of Internal Affairs
- 1974–1976: Minister of Internal Affairs
- 1975: Minister of Welfare
- 1977–1984: Minister of Internal Affairs
- 1981–1984: Minister of Religious Affairs
- 1984: Minister without Portfolio
- 1984–1986: Minister of Religious Affairs

Faction represented in the Knesset
- 1949–1951: United Religious Front
- 1951–1956: Hapoel HaMizrachi
- 1956–1969: National Religious Party
- 1974–1988: National Religious Party

Personal details
- Born: 31 January 1909 Dresden, Germany
- Died: 15 October 1999 (aged 90) Jerusalem, Israel

Shlomo Joseph Burg (Hebrew: שלמה יוסף בורג, romanized: Shlomo Yosef Burg, 31 January 1909 – 15 October 1999) was a German-born Israeli politician. In 1949, he was elected to the first Knesset and served in many ministerial positions for the next 40 years. He was one of the founders of the National Religious Party.

== Biography ==
Shlomo Yosef Burg was born in Dresden, Germany, on 31 January 1909. He attended the Hildesheimer Rabbinical Seminary in Berlin from 1928 to 1938 and was ordained as a rabbi that year. He also studied at the University of Berlin from 1928 to 1931 and received a Doctorate in mathematics and logic from the University of Leipzig in 1933.

While studying at the University of Leipzig, he joined the Young Mizrahi religious Zionist movement. He arranged Jewish prayer services in private homes after German synagogues were burned, and worked underground to help Jews escape to Britain and the Netherlands. His mother and grandmother died in Nazi concentration camps.

In 1939, he immigrated to Mandate Palestine. When World War II begun, Burg was stuck in Geneva. He returned thanks to the help of a Polish diplomat of Ładoś Group who provided him with a Polish passport. He worked as teacher at the Herzliya Hebrew Gymnasium - where he taught religion wearing a kippa, which he would remove when teaching history - before moving to Jerusalem. There he became a research fellow at Hebrew University of Jerusalem. Burg lived in the Rehavia neighborhood of Jerusalem.

Burg was married to Rivka Slonim, who was born in Hebron and survived the 1929 Hebron massacre. They had a son, Avraham, a politician who served as speaker of the fifteenth Knesset, and two daughters, Ada, a doctor and Zvia.

Burg died on 15 October 1999 at the age of 90 at the Sha'arei Tzedek Medical Center.

=== Political career ===
In Palestine, Burg joined Hapoel HaMizrachi, a religious-Zionist party. Alongside three other religious parties, Hapoel HaMizrachi ran on a joint list called the United Religious Front for the first Knesset elections in 1949. The group won 16 seats, and Burg took a seat in the Knesset, becoming deputy speaker.

In the 1951 elections the party ran by itself, winning eight seats. Burg remained in the Knesset and became minister of health in the third government. In the fourth, fifth and sixth governments he served as minister of postal services, a position he retained until 1958.

In 1956 Hapoel HaMizrachi merged with their ideological twins from the Mizrachi party to form the National Religious Party (NRP). The party was a member of all governments until 1992. In 1977, he became the president of the World Mizrachi Movement. As a key party member, Burg maintained a ministerial position in every Knesset until his resignation from the Knesset and retirement from politics in 1986, having held the positions of minister of welfare, minister of internal affairs, minister without portfolio and minister of religious affairs.

Burg was famous for his erudite wit. Journalists dubbed his appearances in parliament "Burgtheater," after the famous playhouse in Vienna.

== Legacy ==
According to Shimon Peres, Burg's most important legacy was trying to bridge the gulf between religious and secular Jews: "He was a religious man but he believed in compromise." Ehud Barak said Burg took the path of moderation and tolerance and showed a love for Jewish tradition. During his term in office, the killing of six unarmed Israeli Arabs took place on 30 March 1976, on what is known as Land Day (in Arabic: يوم الأرض, Yom al-Ard; in Hebrew: יוֹם הַאֲדָמָה, Yom HaAdama). In response to the Israeli government’s announcement of a plan to expropriate large tracts of Palestinian-owned land for new Jewish settlements, a general strike and numerous demonstrations were organised in the predominantly Palestinian cities of Israel.
