= List of female cabinet ministers of Israel =

This is a list of female cabinet ministers of Israel.

Numerical order represents the order of first appointment to the cabinet.
Age represents age on appointment to that office.

Denotes incumbent minister

#	Name	Portrait	Office	Party	Appointed	Left office	Age	Prime Minister(s)	Government(s)
1	Golda Meir (1898–1978)	Golda Meir.	Minister of Labor	Mapai	10 March 1949	19 June 1956	50	David Ben-Gurion, Moshe Sharett	1st, 2nd, 3rd, 4th, 5th, 6th, 7th
1	Golda Meir (1898–1978)	Golda Meir.	Minister of Foreign Affairs	Mapai, Alignment	18 June 1956	12 January 1966	58	David Ben-Gurion, Levi Eshkol	7th, 8th, 9th, 10th, 11th, 12th
1	Golda Meir (1898–1978)	Golda Meir.	Prime Minister	Labor	17 March 1969	3 June 1974	70	self	14th, 15th, 16th
2	Shulamit Aloni (1928–2014)	Shulamit Aloni.	Minister without Portfolio	Ratz	3 June 1974	6 November 1974	45	Yitzhak Rabin	17th
2	Shulamit Aloni (1928–2014)	Shulamit Aloni.	Minister of Education and Culture	Meretz	13 July 1992	11 May 1993	63	Yitzhak Rabin	25th
2	Shulamit Aloni (1928–2014)	Shulamit Aloni.	Minister without Portfolio	Meretz	11 May 1993	7 June 1993	63	Yitzhak Rabin	25th
2	Shulamit Aloni (1928–2014)	Shulamit Aloni.	Minister of Science and Technology	Meretz	11 May 1993	1 August 1993	63	Yitzhak Rabin	25th
2	Shulamit Aloni (1928–2014)	Shulamit Aloni.	Minister of Communications	Meretz	7 June 1993	18 June 1996	63	Yitzhak Rabin, Shimon Peres	25th, 26th
2	Shulamit Aloni (1928–2014)	Shulamit Aloni.	Minister of Science and the Arts	Meretz	22 November 1995	18 June 1996	66	Shimon Peres	26th
3	Sarah Doron (1922–2010)	Sarah Doron.	Minister without Portfolio	Likud	5 July 1983	13 September 1984	61	Menachem Begin, Yitzhak Shamir	19th, 20th
4	Shoshana Arbeli-Almozlino (1926–2015)	Shoshana Arbeli-Almozlino.	Minister of Health	Alignment	20 October 1986	22 December 1988	60	Yitzhak Shamir	22nd
5	Ora Namir (born 1930)	Ora Namir.	Minister of the Environment	Labor	13 July 1992	31 December 1992	61	Yitzhak Rabin	25th
5	Ora Namir (born 1930)	Ora Namir.	Minister of Labor and Welfare	Labor	31 December 1992	21 May 1996	62	Yitzhak Rabin, Shimon Peres	25th, 26th
6	Limor Livnat (born 1950)	Limor Livnat.	Minister of Communications	Likud	18 June 1996	6 July 1999	45	Benjamin Netanyahu	27th
6	Limor Livnat (born 1950)	Limor Livnat.	Minister of Education	Likud	7 March 2001	14 January 2006	50	Ariel Sharon	29th, 30th
6	Limor Livnat (born 1950)	Limor Livnat.	Minister of Culture and Sport	Likud	31 March 2009	14 May 2015	58	Benjamin Netanyahu	32nd, 33rd
7	Dalia Itzik (born 1952)	Dalia Itzik.	Minister of the Environment	Labor	6 July 1999	7 March 2001	46	Ehud Barak	28th
7	Dalia Itzik (born 1952)	Dalia Itzik.	Minister of Industry and Trade	Labor	7 March 2001	2 November 2002	48	Ariel Sharon	29th
7	Dalia Itzik (born 1952)	Dalia Itzik.	Minister of Communications	Labor	10 January 2005	23 November 2005	52	Ariel Sharon	30th
8	Yuli Tamir (born 1954)	Yuli Tamir.	Minister of Immigrant Absorption	Labor	5 August 1999	7 March 2001	45	Ehud Barak	28th
8	Yuli Tamir (born 1954)	Yuli Tamir.	Minister of Education	Labor	4 May 2006	31 March 2009	52	Ehud Olmert	31st
9	Tzipi Livni (born 1958)	Tzipi Livni.	Minister of Regional Cooperation	Likud	7 March 2001	29 August 2001	42	Ariel Sharon	29th
9	Tzipi Livni (born 1958)	Tzipi Livni.	Minister without Portfolio	Likud	29 August 2001	17 December 2002	43	Ariel Sharon	29th
9	Tzipi Livni (born 1958)	Tzipi Livni.	Minister of Agriculture	Likud	17 December 2002	28 February 2003	44	Ariel Sharon	29th
9	Tzipi Livni (born 1958)	Tzipi Livni.	Minister of Housing and Construction	Likud	4 July 2004	10 January 2005	45	Ariel Sharon	30th
9	Tzipi Livni (born 1958)	Tzipi Livni.	Minister of Immigrant Absorption	Likud, Kadima	28 February 2003	4 May 2006	44	Ariel Sharon, Ehud Olmert	30th
9	Tzipi Livni (born 1958)	Tzipi Livni.	Minister of Justice	Likud, Kadima	5 December 2004	4 May 2006	46	Ariel Sharon, Ehud Olmert	30th
9	Tzipi Livni (born 1958)	Tzipi Livni.	Minister of Foreign Affairs	Kadima	4 May 2006	31 March 2009	47	Ehud Olmert	30th, 31st
9	Tzipi Livni (born 1958)	Tzipi Livni.	Minister of Justice	Kadima	29 November 2006	7 February 2007	48	Ehud Olmert	30th, 31st
9	Tzipi Livni (born 1958)	Tzipi Livni.	Minister of Justice	Hatnuah	18 March 2013	4 December 2014	54	Benjamin Netanyahu	33rd
10	Yehudit Naot (1944-2004)	Yehudit Naot.	Minister of the Environment	Shinui	28 February 2003	17 October 2004	58	Ariel Sharon	30th
11	Ruhama Avraham (born 1964)	Ruhama Avraham.	Minister without Portfolio	Kadima	4 July 2007	14 July 2008	43	Ehud Olmert	31st
11	Ruhama Avraham (born 1964)	Ruhama Avraham.	Minister of Tourism	Kadima	14 July 2008	31 March 2009	44	Ehud Olmert	31st
12	Sofa Landver (born 1949)	Sofa Landver.	Minister of Immigrant Absorption	Yisrael Beiteinu	18 March 2013	10 May 2015	63	Benjamin Netanyahu	32nd
12	Sofa Landver (born 1949)	Sofa Landver.	Minister of Aliyah and Integration	Yisrael Beiteinu	30 May 2016	18 November 2018	66	Benjamin Netanyahu	34th
13	Orit Noked (born 1952)	Orit Noked.	Minister of Agriculture and Rural Development	Independence	19 January 2011	18 March 2013	58	Benjamin Netanyahu	32nd
14	Yael German (born 1947)	Yael German.	Minister of Health	Yesh Atid	18 March 2013	4 December 2014	63	Benjamin Netanyahu	33rd
15=	Gila Gamliel (born 1974)	Gila Gamliel.	Minister for Social Equality	Likud	14 May 2015	17 May 2020	41	Benjamin Netanyahu	34th
15=	Gila Gamliel (born 1974)	Gila Gamliel.	Minister of Environmental Protection	Likud	17 May 2020	13 June 2021	46	Benjamin Netanyahu	35th
15=	Gila Gamliel (born 1974)	Gila Gamliel.	Minister of Intelligence	Likud	29 December 2022	13 March 2024	48	Benjamin Netanyahu	37th
15=	Gila Gamliel (born 1974)	Gila Gamliel.	Minister of Science, Technology and Space	Likud	18 March 2024	Incumbent	50	Benjamin Netanyahu	37th
15=	Miri Regev (born 1965)	Miri Regev.	Minister of Culture and Sport	Likud	14 May 2015	17 May 2020	49	Benjamin Netanyahu	34th
15=	Miri Regev (born 1965)	Miri Regev.	Minister of Transportation	Likud	17 May 2020	13 June 2021	55	Benjamin Netanyahu	35th
15=	Miri Regev (born 1965)	Miri Regev.	Minister of Transportation	Likud	29 December 2022	Incumbent	57	Benjamin Netanyahu	37th
15=	Ayelet Shaked (born 1976)	Ayelet Shaked.	Minister of Justice	The Jewish Home	14 May 2015	4 June 2019	39	Benjamin Netanyahu	34th
15=	Ayelet Shaked (born 1976)	Ayelet Shaked.	Minister of the Interior	Yamina	13 June 2021	29 December 2022	45	Naftali Bennett, Yair Lapid	36th
18	Yifat Shasha-Biton (born 1973)	Yifat Shasha-Biton.	Minister of Construction and Housing	Kulanu	9 January 2019	17 May 2020	45	Benjamin Netanyahu	34th
18	Yifat Shasha-Biton (born 1973)	Yifat Shasha-Biton.	Minister of Education	New Hope	13 June 2021	29 December 2022	48	Naftali Bennett, Yair Lapid	36th
18	Yifat Shasha-Biton (born 1973)	Yifat Shasha-Biton.	Minister without Portfolio	Kulanu	12 October 2023	25 March 2024	50	Benjamin Netanyahu	37th
19	Tzipi Hotovely (born 1978)	Tzipi Hotovely.	Minister of Diaspora Affairs	Likud	5 January 2020	17 May 2020	41	Benjamin Netanyahu	34th
19	Tzipi Hotovely (born 1978)	Tzipi Hotovely.	Minister of Settlement Affairs	Likud	17 May 2020	2 August 2020	41	Benjamin Netanyahu	35th
20=	Meirav Cohen (born 1983)	Meirav Cohen.	Minister for Social Equality	Blue and White, Yesh Atid	17 May 2020	29 December 2022	36	Benjamin Netanyahu, Naftali Bennett, Yair Lapid	35th, 36th
20=	Orit Farkash-Hacohen (born 1970)	Orit Farkash-Hacohen.	Minister of Strategic Affairs	Blue and White	17 May 2020	30 May 2020	49	Benjamin Netanyahu	35th
20=	Orit Farkash-Hacohen (born 1970)	Orit Farkash-Hacohen.	Minister of Tourism	Blue and White	14 October 2020	13 June 2021	49	Benjamin Netanyahu	35th
20=	Orit Farkash-Hacohen (born 1970)	Orit Farkash-Hacohen.	Minister of Science, Technology and Space	Blue and White	13 June 2021	29 December 2022	50	Naftali Bennett, Yair Lapid	36th
20=	Orly Levy-Abekasis (born 1973)	Orlevy-Abekasis.	Minister for Community Empowerment and Advancement	Gesher	17 May 2020	13 June 2021	46	Benjamin Netanyahu	35th
20=	Pnina Tamano-Shata (born 1981)	Pnina Tamano-Shata.	Minister of Immigrant Absorption	Blue and White	17 May 2020	29 December 2022	39	Benjamin Netanyahu, Naftali Bennett, Yair Lapid	35th, 36th
24=	Orna Barbivai (born 1962)	Orna Barbivai.	Minister of Economy	Yesh Atid	13 June 2021	29 December 2022	59	Naftali Bennett, Yair Lapid	36th
24=	Karine Elharrar (born 1977)	Karine Elharrar.	Minister of National Infrastructures, Energy and Water Resources	Yesh Atid	13 June 2021	29 December 2022	43	Naftali Bennett, Yair Lapid	36th
24=	Merav Michaeli (born 1966)	Merav Michaeli.	Minister of Transportation and Road Safety	Labor	13 June 2021	29 December 2022	54	Naftali Bennett, Yair Lapid	36th
24=	Tamar Zandberg (born 1976)	Tamar Zandberg.	Minister of Environmental Protection	Meretz	13 June 2021	29 December 2022	45	Naftali Bennett, Yair Lapid	36th
28=	Galit Distel-Atbaryan (born 1971)	Galit Distel-Atbaryan.	Minister of Information	Likud	29 December 2022	12 October 2023	51	Benjamin Netanyahu	37th
28=	May Golan (born 1986)	May Golan.	Minister for Social Equality	Likud	29 December 2022	Incumbent	36	Benjamin Netanyahu	37th
28=	May Golan (born 1986)	May Golan.	Minister for Women's Empowerment	Likud	24 January 2024	Incumbent	37	Benjamin Netanyahu	37th
28=	Idit Silman (born 1980)	Idit Silman.	Minister of Environmental Protection	Likud	29 December 2022	Incumbent	42	Benjamin Netanyahu	37th
28=	Orit Strook (born 1960)	Orit Strook.	Minister of Settlements and National Missions	Religious Zionist	29 December 2022	Incumbent	62	Benjamin Netanyahu	37th

== See also ==
- Cabinet
- Cabinet of Israel
- Politics of Israel
