= Seventh government of Israel =

1955–58 government led by David Ben-Gurion

Fifth Ben-Gurion Cabinet
- 7th Cabinet of Israel

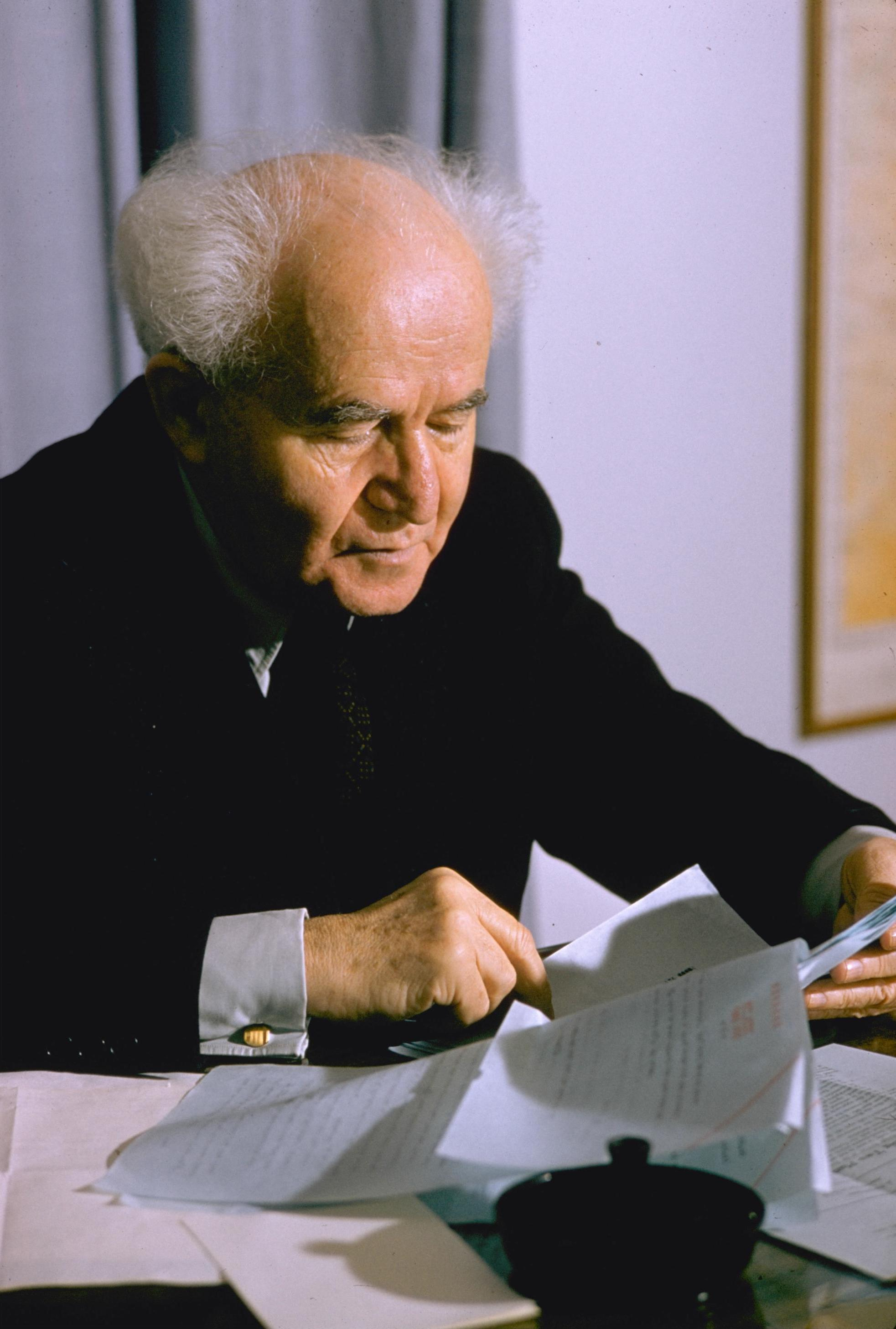
- Date formed: 3 November 1955
- Date dissolved: 7 January 1958

People and organisations
- Head of state: Yitzhak Ben-Zvi
- Head of government: David Ben-Gurion
- Member parties: Mapai; Mapam; Ahdut HaAvoda; Progressive Party; National Religious Party; Democratic List for Israeli Arabs; Progress and Work; Agriculture and Development
- Status in legislature: Coalition
- Opposition leader: Menachem Begin

History
- Election: 1955 Israeli legislative election
- Legislature term: 3rd Knesset
- Predecessor: 6th cabinet of Israel
- Successor: 8th cabinet of Israel

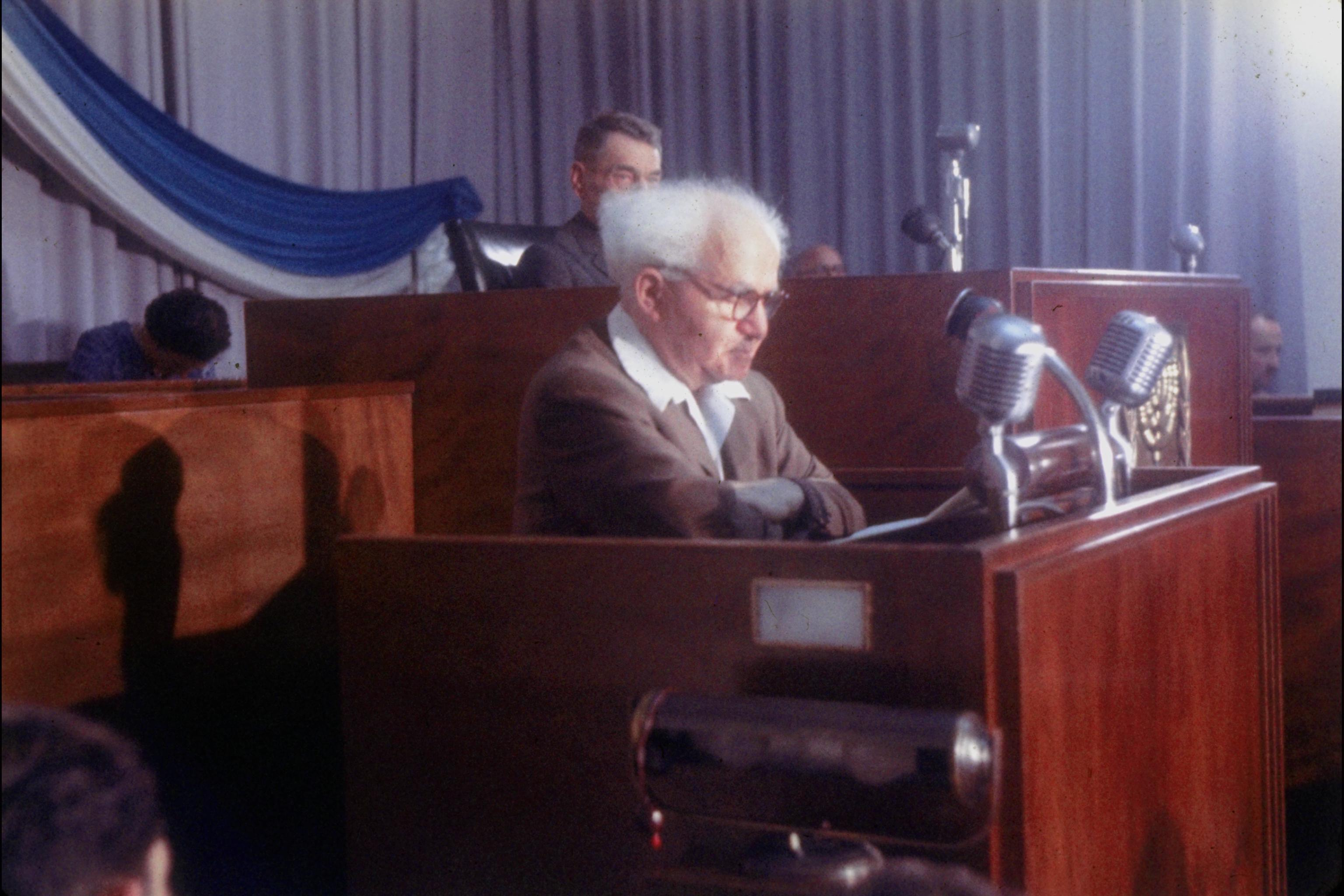
David Ben Gurion speaking at the Knesset, 1957

The seventh government of Israel was formed by David Ben-Gurion on 3 November 1955 following the July 1955 elections. His coalition included Mapai, the National Religious Front, Mapam, Ahdut HaAvoda, the Progressive Party, and the Israeli Arab parties, the Democratic List for Israeli Arabs, Progress and Work and Agriculture and Development.

On 17 December 1957 Ben-Gurion accused Ahdut HaAvoda ministers of leaking information about IDF Chief of Staff Moshe Dayan's trip to West Germany to the press and demanded their resignation. The government fell after Ben-Gurion resigned on 31 December 1957 over the issue, but remained in place until Ben-Gurion formed the eighth government a week later.

Seventh government of Israel
Portfolio	Minister	Party
Prime Minister; Minister of Defense	David Ben-Gurion	Mapai
Minister of Agriculture	Kadish Luz	Mapai
Minister of Development	Mordechai Bentov	Mapam
Minister of Education and Culture	Zalman Aran	Mapai
Minister of Finance	Levi Eshkol	Mapai
Minister of Foreign Affairs	Moshe Sharett (3 November 1955 – 19 June 1956)	Mapai
Minister of Foreign Affairs	Golda Meir (19 June 1956 – 7 January 1958)	Mapai
Minister of Health	Israel Barzilai	Mapam
Minister of Internal Affairs	Israel Bar-Yehuda	Ahdut HaAvoda
Minister of Justice	Pinchas Rosen (3 November 1955 – 13 February 1956, 28 February 1956 – 7 January 1958)	Progressive Party
Minister of Justice	David Ben-Gurion (13 - 28 February 1956)	Mapai
Minister of Labour	Golda Meir (3 November 1955 – 19 June 1956)	Mapai
Minister of Labour	Mordechai Namir (19 June 1956 – 7 January 1958)	Mapai
Minister of Police	Bechor-Shalom Sheetrit	Mapai
Minister of Postal Services	Yosef Burg	National Religious Front
Minister of Religions; Minister of Welfare	Haim-Moshe Shapira	National Religious Front
Minister of Trade and Industry	Pinhas Sapir	Not an MK ^{1}
Minister of Transportation	Moshe Carmel	Not an MK ^{2}
Minister without Portfolio	Peretz Naftali	Mapai
Deputy Minister of Agriculture	Ze'ev Tzur	Ahdut HaAvoda
Deputy Minister of Education and Culture	Moshe Unna (3 November 1955 – 31 December 1957)	National Religious Front
Deputy Minister of Education and Culture	Ami Assaf (11 June 1956 – 7 January 1958)	Mapai
Deputy Minister of Religions	Zerach Warhaftig (3 November 1955 – 28 December 1957)	National Religious Front
Deputy Minister of Welfare	Shlomo-Yisrael Ben-Meir (20 December 1955 – 7 January 1958)	National Religious Front

^{1} Sapir was elected to the next Knesset as an MK for Mapai.

^{2} Carmel later joined the third Knesset as an MK for Ahdut HaAvoda.
