= Eighth government of Israel =

1958–59 government led by David Ben-Gurion

Sixth Ben-Gurion Cabinet
- 8th Cabinet of Israel

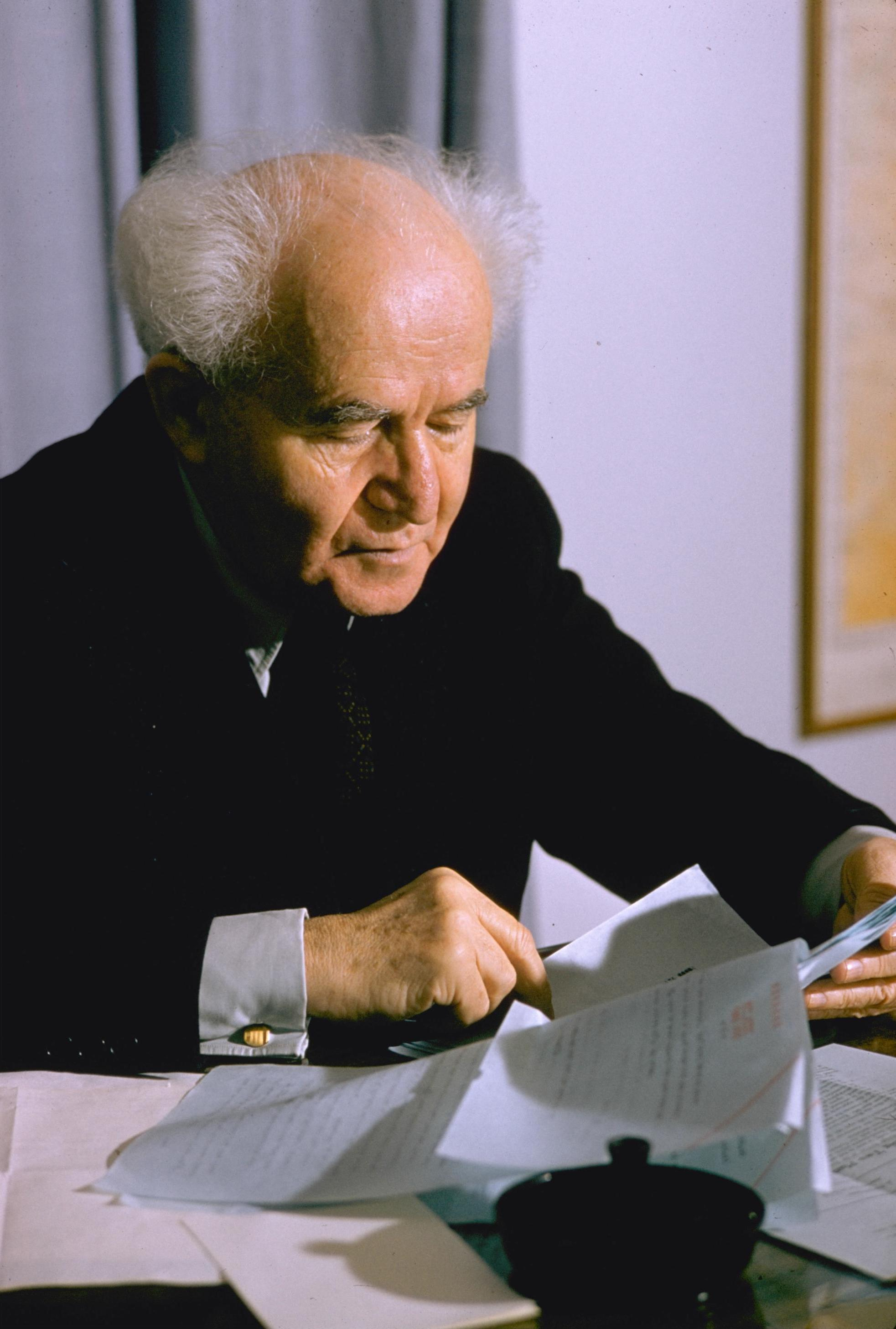
- Date formed: 7 January 1958
- Date dissolved: 17 December 1959

People and organisations
- Head of state: Yitzhak Ben-Zvi
- Head of government: David Ben-Gurion
- Member parties: Mapai; Mapam; Ahdut HaAvoda; Progressive Party; National Religious Party; Democratic List for Israeli Arabs; Progress and Work; Agriculture and Development
- Status in legislature: Coalition
- Opposition leader: Menachem Begin

History
- Legislature term: 3rd Knesset
- Predecessor: 7th cabinet of Israel
- Successor: 9th cabinet of Israel

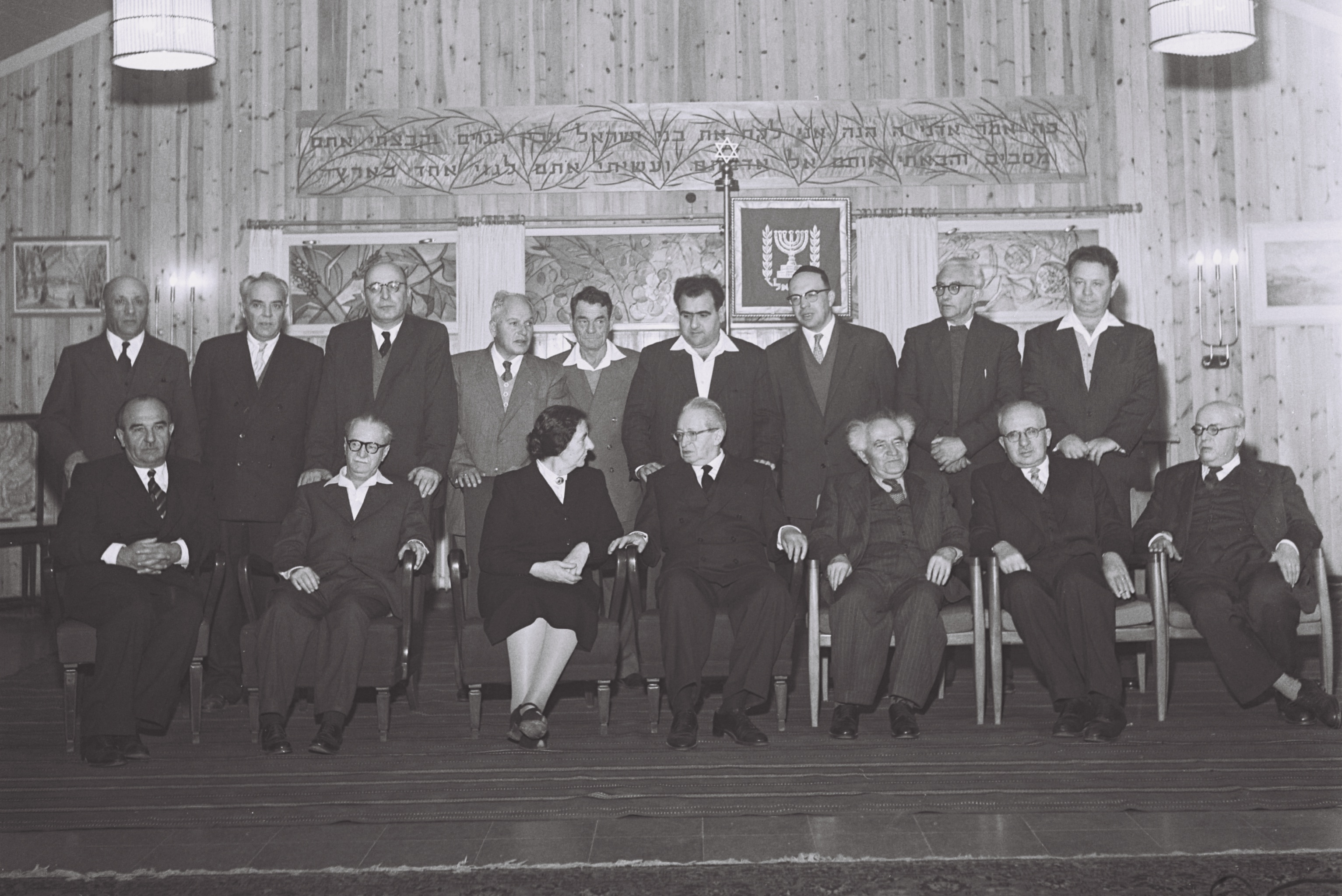
January 8, 1958:Ministers of the Eighth Government with the President. Sitting from left to right: Levi Eshkol, Yisrael Bar-Yehuda, Golda Meir, President Yitzhak Ben-Zvi, David Ben-Gurion, Pinchas Rosen, Peretz Naftali. Standing from left to right: Mordechai Namir, Zalman Aran, Pinchas Sapir, Bechor-Shalom Sheetrit, Kadish Luz, Yisrael Barzilai, Yosef Burg, Mordechai Bentov and Moshe Carmel

The eighth government of Israel was formed by David Ben-Gurion on 7 January 1958, and was the second government of the third Knesset. Ben-Gurion kept the same coalition partners as during the previous government, i.e. Mapai, the National Religious Party, Mapam, Ahdut HaAvoda, the Progressive Party, the Democratic List for Israeli Arabs, Progress and Work and Agriculture and Development. The only change to the cabinet was the addition of Shlomo-Yisrael Ben-Meir as a Deputy Minister.

All ministers and deputy ministers from the National Religious Party left the cabinet on 1 July 1958.

The government collapsed following Ben-Gurion's resignation on 5 July 1959 after Ahdut HaAvoda and Mapam voted against the government during a vote on selling arms to West Germany and then refused to resign from the government. New elections were called in November that year after Ben-Gurion told President Yitzhak Ben-Zvi that he was unable to form a new government.

== Cabinet members ==
Eighth government of Israel
Portfolio	Minister	Party
Prime Minister Minister of Defense	David Ben-Gurion	Mapai
Minister of Agriculture	Kadish Luz (7 January 1958 – 30 November 1959)	Mapai
Minister of Agriculture	David Ben-Gurion (30 November – 17 December 1959)	Mapai
Minister of Development	Mordechai Bentov	Mapam
Minister of Education and Culture	Zalman Aran	Mapai
Minister of Finance	Levi Eshkol	Mapai
Minister of Foreign Affairs	Golda Meir	Mapai
Minister of Health	Israel Barzilai	Mapam
Minister of Internal Affairs	Israel Bar-Yehuda	Ahdut HaAvoda
Minister of Justice	Pinchas Rosen	Progressive Party
Minister of Labour	Mordechai Namir	Mapai
Minister of Police	Bechor-Shalom Sheetrit	Mapai
Minister of Postal Services	Yosef Burg (7 January 1958 – 1 July 1958)	National Religious Party
Minister of Postal Services	David Ben-Gurion (1 July – 24 November 1958)	Mapai
Minister of Postal Services	Israel Barzilai (24 November 1958 – 17 December 1959)	Mapai
Minister of Religions	Haim-Moshe Shapira (7 January 1958 – 1 July 1958)	National Religious Party
Minister of Religions	David Ben-Gurion (1 July – 3 December 1958)	Mapai
Minister of Religions	Ya'akov Moshe Toledano (3 December 1958 – 17 December 1959)	Not an MK
Minister of Trade and Industry	Pinhas Sapir	Not an MK ^{1}
Minister of Welfare	Haim Moshe Shapira (7 January 1958 – 1 July 1958)	National Religious Party
Minister of Welfare	David Ben-Gurion (1 July 1958 – 26 January 1959)	Mapai
Minister of Welfare	Peretz Naftali (26 January – 17 December 1959)	Mapai
Minister of Transportation	Moshe Carmel	Ahdut HaAvoda
Minister without Portfolio	Peretz Naftali (7 January 1958 – 25 January 1959)	Mapai
Minister without Portfolio	Kadish Luz (30 November – 17 December 1959)	Mapai
Deputy Minister of Agriculture	Ze'ev Tzur	Ahdut HaAvoda
Deputy Minister of Education and Culture	Moshe Unna (13 January – 1 July 1958)	National Religious Party
Deputy Minister of Education and Culture	Ami Assaf (13 January 1958 – 17 December 1959)	Mapai
Deputy Minister of Religions	Zerach Warhaftig (13 January – 1 July 1958)	National Religious Party
Deputy Minister of Welfare	Shlomo-Yisrael Ben-Meir (13 January – 1 July 1958)	National Religious Party

^{1} Although Sapir was not an MK during the third Knesset, he was later an MK for Mapai.

^{2} Carmel did not enter the Knesset until 9 June 1958.
