= Ninth government of Israel =

1959–61 government led by David Ben-Gurion

Seventh Ben-Gurion Cabinet
- 9th Cabinet of Israel

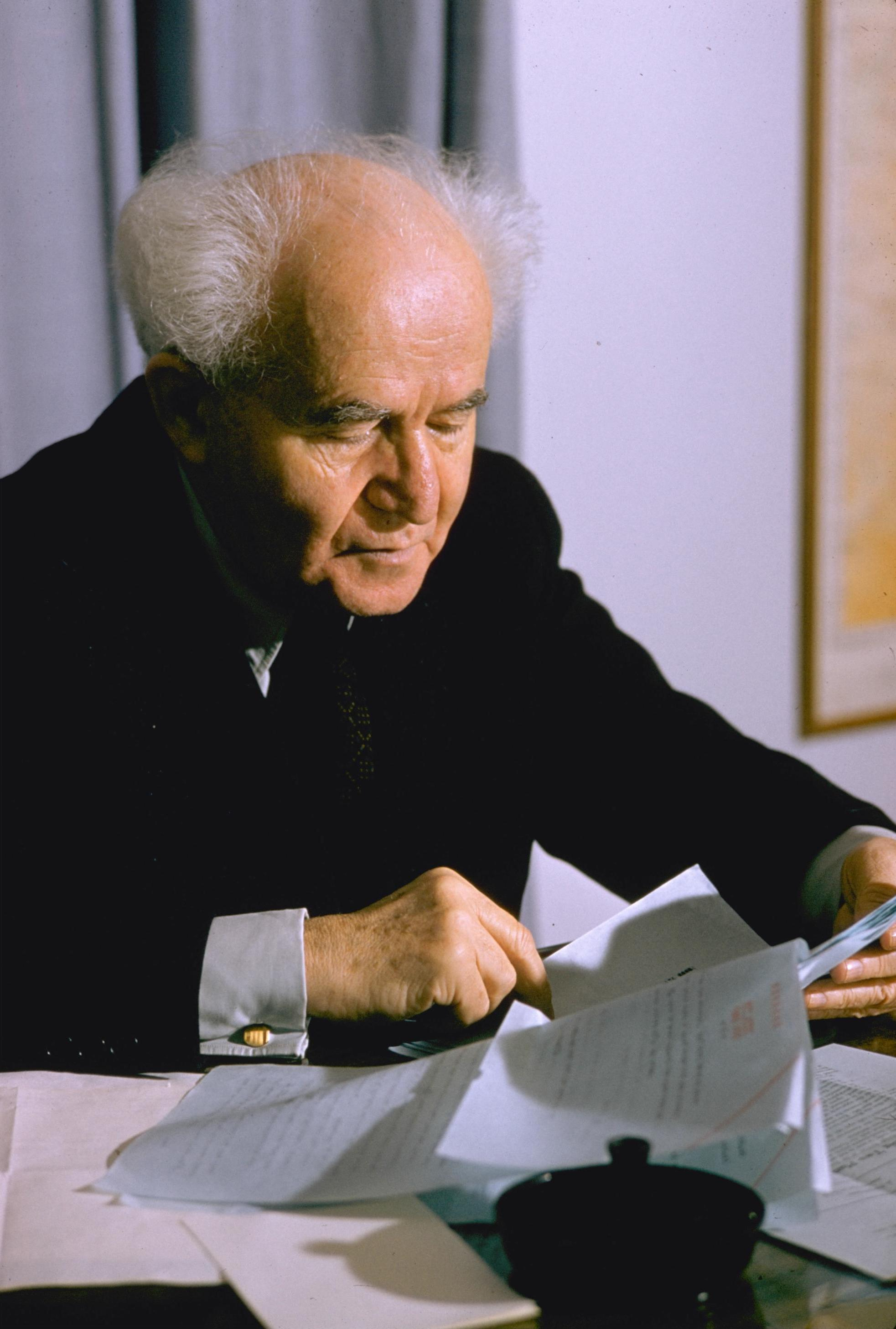
- Date formed: 17 December 1959
- Date dissolved: 2 November 1961

People and organisations
- Head of state: Yitzhak Ben-Zvi
- Head of government: David Ben-Gurion
- Member parties: Mapai; Mapam; Ahdut HaAvoda; National Religious Party; Progressive Party; Religious Torah Front; Agriculture and Development; Progress and Development; Cooperation and Brotherhood
- Status in legislature: coalition
- Opposition leader: Menachem Begin

History
- Election: 1959 Israeli legislative election
- Legislature term: 4th Knesset
- Predecessor: 8th cabinet of Israel
- Successor: 10th cabinet of Israel

The ninth government of Israel was formed by David Ben-Gurion on 17 December 1959 following the November 1959 elections. Ben-Gurion largely kept the same coalition partners as during the previous government (i.e. Mapai, the National Religious Party, Mapam, Ahdut HaAvoda, the Progressive Party and Agriculture and Development), and added the new Israeli Arab parties Progress and Development and Cooperation and Brotherhood.

The government collapsed when Ben-Gurion resigned on 31 January 1961, over a motion of no-confidence brought by Herut and the General Zionists following the publication of the findings of the Committee of Seven concerning the Lavon Affair. At the end of February Ben-Gurion informed President Yitzhak Ben-Zvi that he could not form a new government, and new elections were called after the Knesset was dissolved in March.

== Cabinet members ==
Ninth government of Israel
Portfolio	Minister	Party
Prime Minister; Minister of Defense	David Ben-Gurion	Mapai
Minister of Agriculture	Moshe Dayan	Mapai
Minister of Development	Mordechai Bentov	Mapam
Minister of Education and Culture	Zalman Aran (17 December 1959 – 10 May 1960)	Mapai
Minister of Education and Culture	David Ben-Gurion (10 May – 3 August 1960)	Mapai
Minister of Education and Culture	Abba Eban (3 August 1960 – 2 November 1961)	Mapai
Minister of Finance	Levi Eshkol	Mapai
Minister of Foreign Affairs	Golda Meir	Mapai
Minister of Health	Israel Barzilai	Mapam
Minister of Internal Affairs	Haim-Moshe Shapira	National Religious Party
Minister of Justice	Pinchas Rosen	Progressive Party
Minister of Labour	Giora Yoseftal	Mapai
Minister of Police	Bechor-Shalom Sheetrit	Mapai
Minister of Postal Services	David Ben-Gurion (17 December 1959 – 5 July 1960)	Mapai
Minister of Postal Services	Bechor-Shalom Sheetrit (5–18 July 1960)	Mapai
Minister of Postal Services	Binyamin Mintz (18 July 1960 – 30 May 1961)^{1}	Religious Torah Front
Minister of Religions	Ya'akov Moshe Toledano (17 December 1959 – 15 October 1960)^{1}	Not an MK
Minister of Religions	David Ben-Gurion (15 October 1960 – 2 November 1961)	Mapai
Minister of Trade and Industry	Pinhas Sapir	Mapai
Minister of Welfare	Yosef Burg	National Religious Party
Minister of Transportation	Yitzhak Ben-Aharon	Ahdut HaAvoda
Minister without Portfolio	Abba Eban (17 December 1959 – 3 August 1960)	Mapai
Deputy Minister of Defense	Shimon Peres (21 December 1959 – 2 November 1961)	Mapai
Deputy Minister of Education and Culture	Ami Assaf (28 December 1959 – 2 November 1961)	Mapai
Deputy Minister of Internal Affairs	Shlomo-Yisrael Ben-Meir (28 December 1959 – 2 November 1961)	National Religious Party

^{1} Died in office.
