= Tenth government of Israel =

1961–63 government led by David Ben-Gurion

Eighth Ben-Gurion Cabinet
- 10th Cabinet of Israel

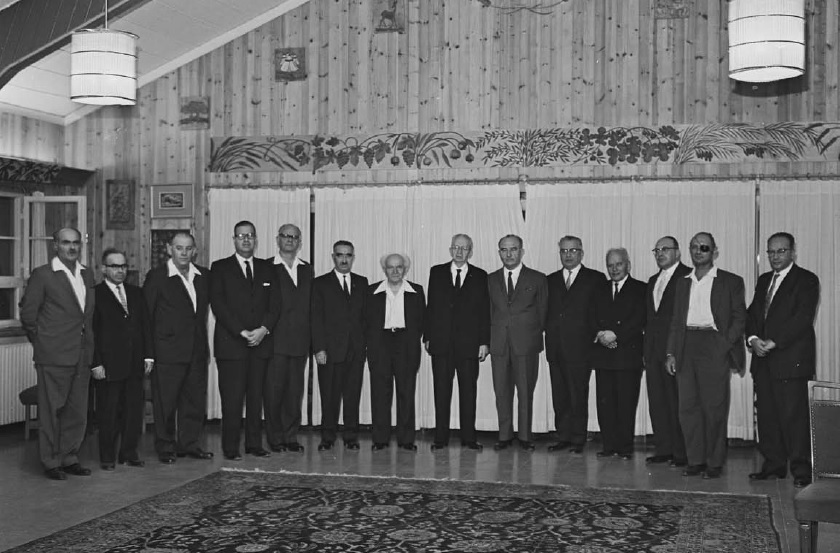
- Date formed: 2 November 1961
- Date dissolved: 26 June 1963

People and organisations
- Head of state: Yitzhak Ben-Zvi (until 23 April 1963); Zalman Shazar (from 21 May 1963)
- Head of government: David Ben-Gurion
- Member parties: Mapai; National Religious Party; Ahdut HaAvoda; Poalei Agudat Yisrael; Cooperation and Brotherhood; Progress and Development
- Status in legislature: Coalition
- Opposition leader: Menachem Begin

History
- Election: 1961 Israeli legislative election
- Legislature term: 5th Knesset
- Predecessor: 9th cabinet of Israel
- Successor: 11th cabinet of Israel

The tenth government of Israel was formed on 2 November 1961 following the August elections. Although David Ben-Gurion was appointed prime minister, the government was actually formed by Minister of Finance Levi Eshkol. On 7 September Ben-Gurion had told President Yitzhak Ben-Zvi that he was unable to form a government; on 14 September Ben-Zvi asked Eshkol to form a government, with Eshkol subsequently announcing that he would do so with Ben-Gurion as PM. It turned out to be the last government led by Ben-Gurion.

The coalition included Mapai, the National Religious Party, Ahdut HaAvoda, Poalei Agudat Yisrael, Cooperation and Brotherhood and Progress and Development. Deputy Ministers were appointed four days after the cabinet was in place.

The government fell on 16 June 1963 when Ben-Gurion resigned "because of personal needs". However, in reality he was annoyed at a perceived lack of support from his colleagues.

== Cabinet members ==
Tenth government of Israel
Portfolio	Minister	Party
Prime Minister; Minister of Defense	David Ben-Gurion	Mapai
Minister of Agriculture	Moshe Dayan	Mapai
Minister of Development	Giora Yoseftal (2 November 1961 – 23 August 1962) ^{1}	Mapai
Minister of Development	Yosef Almogi (30 October 1962 – 26 June 1963)	Mapai
Minister of Education and Culture	Abba Eban	Mapai
Minister of Finance	Levi Eshkol	Mapai
Minister of Foreign Affairs	Golda Meir	Mapai
Minister of Health; Minister of Internal Affairs	Haim-Moshe Shapira	National Religious Party
Minister of Housing	Giora Yoseftal (2 November 1961 – 23 August 1962) ^{1}	Mapai
Minister of Housing	Yosef Almogi (29 October 1962 – 26 June 1963)	Mapai
Minister of Justice	Dov Yosef	Not an MK ^{2}
Minister of Labour	Yigal Allon	Mapai
Minister of Police	Bechor-Shalom Sheetrit	Mapai
Minister of Postal Services	Eliyahu Sasson	Not an MK ^{3}
Minister of Religions	Zerach Warhaftig	National Religious Party
Minister of Trade and Industry	Pinchas Sapir	Mapai
Minister of Transportation	Yitzhak Ben-Aharon (2 November 1961 – 28 May 1962)	Ahdut HaAvoda
Minister of Transportation	Yisrael Bar-Yehuda (28 May 1962 – 26 June 1963)	Ahdut HaAvoda
Minister of Welfare	Yosef Burg	National Religious Party
Minister without Portfolio	Yosef Almogi (2 November 1961 – 30 October 1962)	Mapai
Deputy Minister of Defense	Shimon Peres (6 November 1961 – 26 June 1963)	Mapai
Deputy Minister of Education and Culture	Ami Assaf (6 November 1961 – 17 May 1963) ^{1}	Mapai
Deputy Minister of Education and Culture	Kalman Kahana (29 November 1961 – 26 June 1963)	Poalei Agudat Yisrael
Deputy Minister of Education and Culture	Mordechai Zar (27 May 1963 – 17 May 1963)	Mapai
Deputy Minister of Finance	Yitzhak Coren (30 May 1962 – 26 June 1963)	Mapai
Deputy Minister of Health	Yitzhak Rafael (6 November 1961 – 26 June 1963)	National Religious Party
Deputy Minister of Internal Affairs	Shlomo-Yisrael Ben-Meir (18 February 1962 – 26 June 1963)	National Religious Party

^{1} Died in office.

^{2} Although Yosef was not an MK at the time, he was a member of Mapai.

^{3} Although Sasson was not an MK at the time, he was elected to the next Knesset as a member of the Alignment, an alliance of Mapai and Ahdut HaAvoda.
