= Sharon government =

The Sharon government refers to the Israeli government when it was led by Prime Minister Ariel Sharon. It may refer to:

- The Twenty-ninth government of Israel
- The Thirtieth government of Israel
