= Michael Dekel =

Israeli politician (1920–1994)

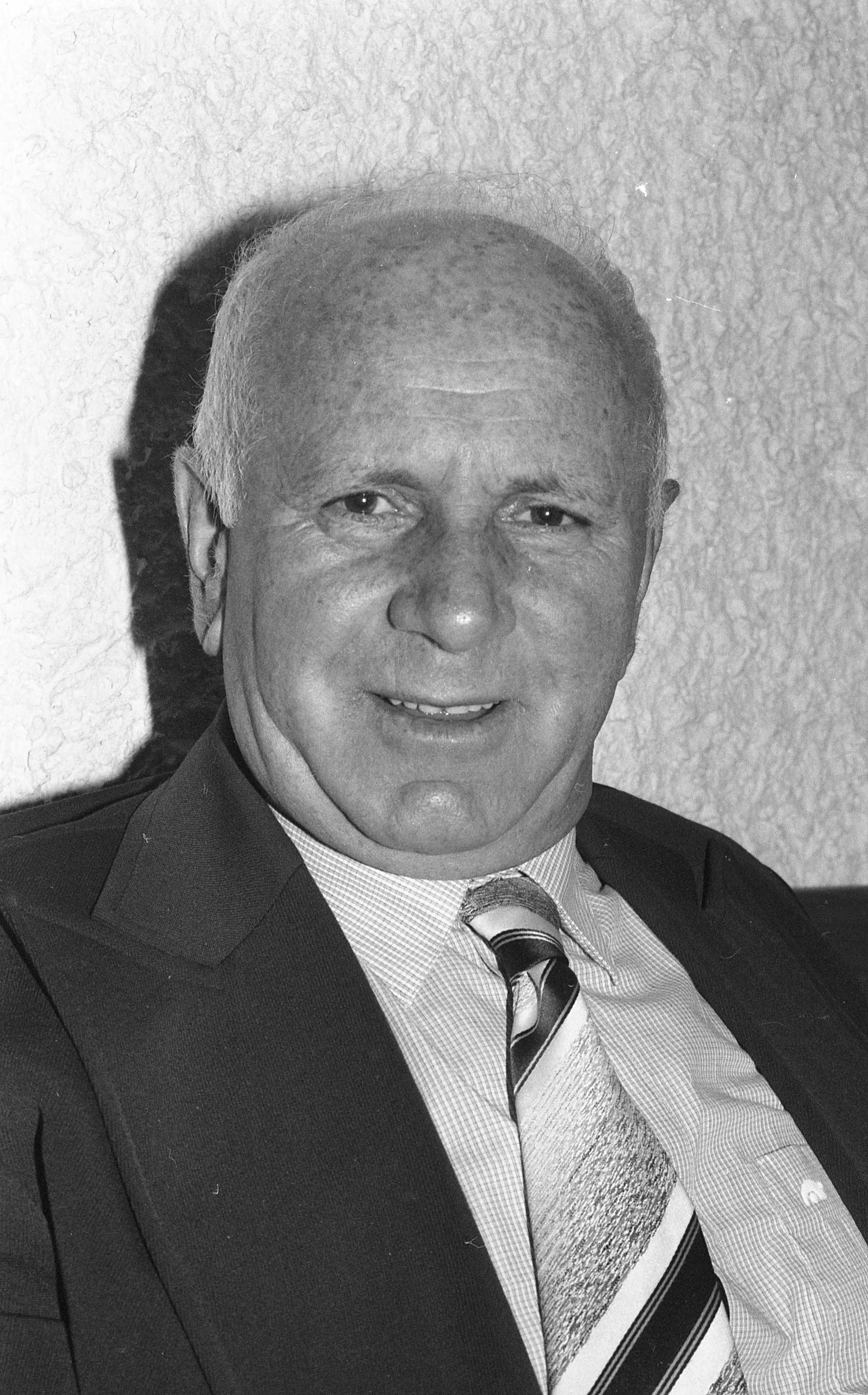
- Dekel in 1981

Faction represented in the Knesset
- 1977–1988: Likud

Personal details
- Born: 1 August 1920 Pinsk, Poland
- Died: 20 September 1994 (aged 74)

Michael Dekel (Hebrew: מיכאל דקל; 1 August 1920 – 20 September 1994) was an Israeli politician who served as a member of the Knesset for Likud between 1977 and 1988.

== Biography ==
Dekel was born in Pińsk, Poland (now in Belarus) in 1920. During World War II he served in the Red Army between 1943 and 1944, and then the Polish Army from 1944 until 1946. After the war, he became commander of a Betar group in a Displaced Persons camp in Austria, and was also amongst the leaders of the Austrian Irgun branch.

In 1949 he emigrated to Israel. The following year he joined moshav Nordia, which had been founded by former Irgun members. He also became a member of the Herut party and in 1966 became a member of its directorate and central committee.

In 1977 he was elected to the Knesset on the Likud list (an alliance of Herut and other right-wing parties). He was re-elected in 1981 and was appointed Deputy Minister of Agriculture on 11 August that year. He was re-elected again in 1984 and was appointed Deputy Minister of Defense on 3 December 1985. He held the post until 21 November 1988, three weeks after losing his seat in the elections.

He died in 1994 at the age of 74.
