= Ministry of Defense (Israel) =

Israeli governmental ministry responsible for military and national defense matters

- משרד הביטחון

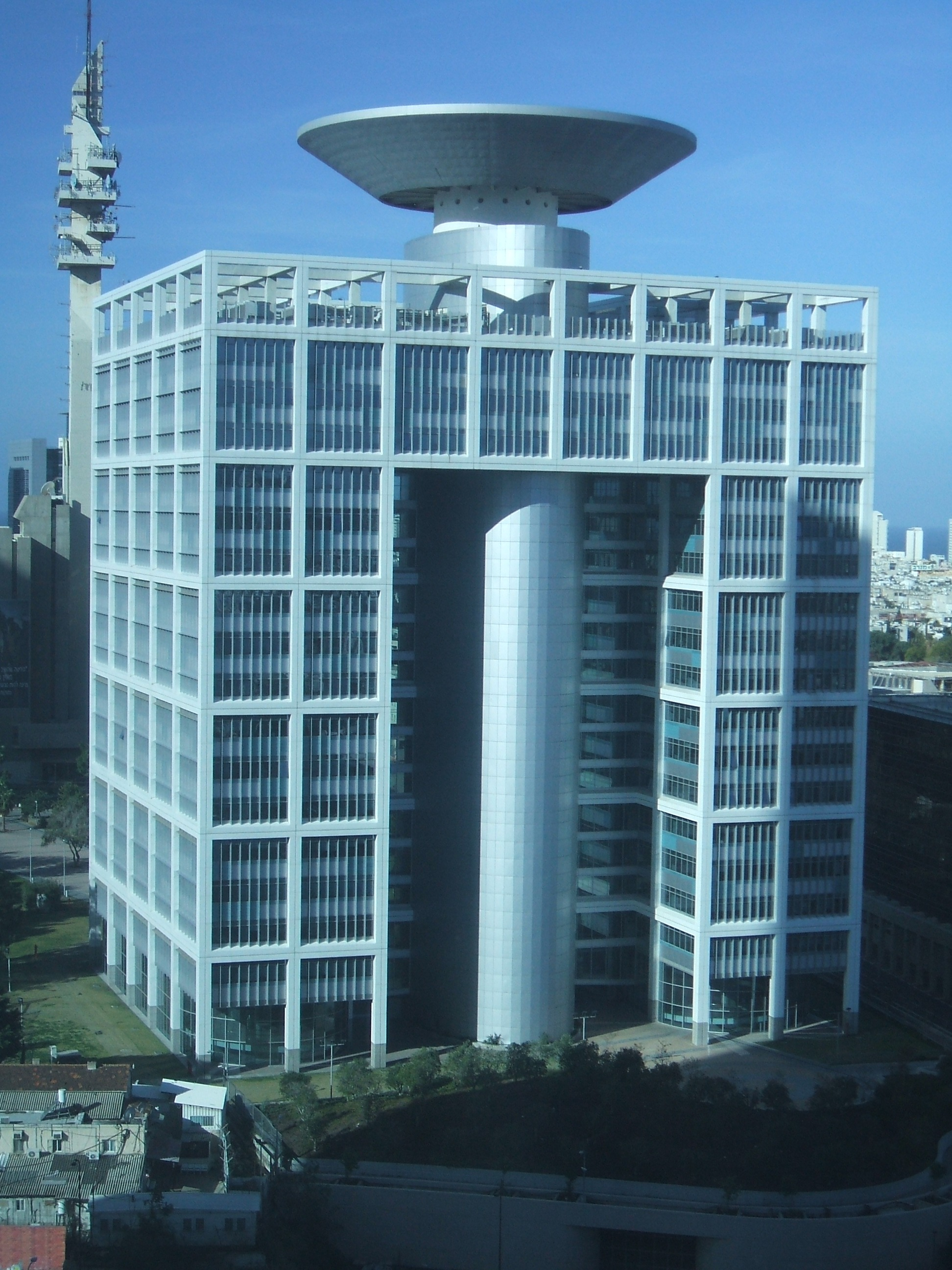
- Ministry of Defense headquarters

Agency overview
- Formed: 1948
- Jurisdiction: Government of Israel
- Headquarters: Matcal Tower, HaKirya, Tel Aviv; 32°4′30.97″N 34°47′24.55″E
- Annual budget: 56 billion New Shekel
- Minister responsible: Israel Katz, Minister of Defense
- Website: www.mod.gov.il

The Ministry of Defense (Hebrew: משרד הביטחון, romanized: Misrad HaBitahon, lit. 'Ministry of Security', acronym: Hebrew: משהב״ט) of the government of Israel, is the governmental department responsible for defending the State of Israel from internal and external military threats. Its political head is the defense minister of Israel, and its offices are located in HaKirya, Tel Aviv.

The Ministry of Defense oversees most of the Israeli security forces, including the Israel Defense Forces (IDF), Israel Military Industries (IMI), and Israel Aerospace Industries (IAI).

The ministry was established when the British Mandate of Palestine ended, and the British Army departed Palestine and the State of Israel was formed. This ended the rag-tag militia units during British rule and gave way to the formal defense of the Jewish state.

== Structure ==
- Home Front Defense Ministry, headed by the deputy defense minister
- Israeli National Emergency Authority, Rahel
- Directorate of Defence Research & Development, Maf'at
- Coordinator of Government Activities in the Territories, Matpash
- Director of Security of the Defense Establishment, Malmab
- Defense Establishment Comptroller Unit
- Defense Political Branch, Abtam
- International Defense Cooperation Directorate, Sibat (Hebrew: האגף לייצוא ביטחוני (סיבט))
- Computer and Management information systems, Malam – Data Processing Center
- Logistics Operations and properties Branch, Emun
- Defense Social branch
- Department of Defense Export Control, Api
- Tank program Directorate
- Procurement and Production Directorate, Manhar
- Emergency management, Melakh
- Ombudsman for soldiers, Nakhal
- Fund and Unit for Discharged Soldiers
- Department of Families and Remembrance
- Disabled Rehabilitation Division

== Minister of Defense ==
Minister of Defense flag

The defense minister of Israel (Hebrew: שר הביטחון, romanized: Sar HaBitahon, lit. 'Minister of Security') (Note: Although the "Security Minister" (שר הביטחון) title is translated in English as "Defense Minister", in Hebrew, the Defense Ministers of other countries are more often referred to as "Defense Minister" (Hebrew: שר ההגנה, Sar HaHagana).) heads the ministry. The post is considered to be the second most important position in the Israeli cabinet, and usually has a deputy minister. The defense minister is also a permanent member of the Security Cabinet.

Due to the great importance of the defense portfolio, prime ministers have often held the position in addition to their prime ministerial duties; eight of the twenty defense ministers to date were also serving prime ministers. Six of them (Moshe Dayan, Yitzhak Rabin, Ehud Barak, Shaul Mofaz, Moshe Ya'alon and Benny Gantz) are also former Chiefs of Staff of the Israel Defense Forces.

Amongst the duties of the post, defense ministers can request administrative detention. Because of the intensive work and the tension between the political echelon to the military echelon, frequently disagreements and difference of opinion are created between the defense minister and the chief of staff.

=== List of ministers ===
#	Minister	Party	Governments	Term start	Term end	Duration	Notes
1	David Ben-Gurion	Mapai	P, 1, 2, 3, 4	14 May 1948	26 January 1954	5 years, 257 days	Serving Prime Minister
2	Pinhas Lavon	Mapai	5	26 January 1954	21 February 1955	1 year, 26 days	
–	David Ben-Gurion	Mapai	5, 6, 7, 8, 9, 10	21 February 1955	26 June 1963	8 years, 125 days	Serving Prime Minister
3	Levi Eshkol	Mapai, Alignment	11, 12, 13	26 June 1963	5 June 1967	3 years, 344 days	Serving Prime Minister
4	Moshe Dayan	Rafi, Labor Party, Alignment	13, 14, 15, 16	5 June 1967	3 June 1974	6 years, 363 days	
5	Shimon Peres	Alignment	17	3 June 1974	20 June 1977	3 years, 17 days	
6	Ezer Weizman	Likud	18	20 June 1977	28 May 1980	2 years, 343 days	
7	Menachem Begin	Likud	18	28 May 1980	5 August 1981	1 year, 0 days	Serving Prime Minister
8	Ariel Sharon	Likud	19	5 August 1981	14 February 1983	1 year, 193 days	
–	Menachem Begin	Likud	19	14 February 1983	23 February 1983	9 days	Serving Prime Minister
9	Moshe Arens	Likud	19, 20	23 February 1983	13 September 1984	1 year, 203 days	
10	Yitzhak Rabin	Alignment	21, 22, 23	13 September 1984	15 March 1990	5 years, 183 days	
11	Yitzhak Shamir	Likud	23	15 March 1990	11 June 1990	88 days	Serving Prime Minister
–	Moshe Arens	Likud	24	11 June 1990	13 July 1992	32 days	
–	Yitzhak Rabin	Labor Party	25	13 July 1992	4 November 1995	3 years, 114 days	Serving Prime Minister, assassinated
–	Shimon Peres	Labor Party	25, 26	4 November 1995	18 June 1996	227 days	Serving Prime Minister
12	Yitzhak Mordechai	Likud	27	18 June 1996	25 January 1999	2 years, 221 days	
–	Moshe Arens	Likud	27	27 January 1999	6 July 1999	160 days	
13	Ehud Barak	One Israel	28	6 July 1999	7 March 2001	1 year, 244 days	Serving Prime Minister
14	Binyamin Ben-Eliezer	Labor Party	29	7 March 2001	2 November 2002	1 year, 240 days	
15	Shaul Mofaz	Likud	29, 30	4 November 2002	4 May 2006	3 years, 181 days	Not an MK at start of term in office
16	Amir Peretz	Labor Party	31	4 May 2006	18 June 2007	1 year, 45 days	
–	Ehud Barak	Labor Party, Independence	31, 32	18 June 2007	18 March 2013	5 years, 273 days	Not an MK at start of term in office
17	Moshe Ya'alon	Likud	33, 34	18 March 2013	22 May 2016	3 years, 65 days	
–	Benjamin Netanyahu	Likud	34	22 May 2016	30 May 2016	8 days	Serving Prime Minister; Acting minister
18	Avigdor Lieberman	Yisrael Beiteinu	34	30 May 2016	18 November 2018	2 years, 172 days	
19	Benjamin Netanyahu	Likud	34	18 November 2018	8 November 2019	355 days	Serving Prime Minister
20	Naftali Bennett	New Right	34	8 November 2019	17 May 2020	191 days	
21	Benny Gantz	Blue and White	35, 36	17 May 2020	29 December 2022	2 years, 226 days	Serving Alternate Prime Minister
22	Yoav Gallant	Likud	37	29 December 2022	5 November 2024	1 year, 312 days	
23	Israel Katz	Likud	37	5 November 2024	1 year, 351 days		

==== Deputy ministers ====
#	Minister	Party	Governments	Term start	Term end
1	Shimon Peres	Mapai	9, 10, 11, 12	21 December 1959	25 May 1965
2	Zvi Dinstein	Alignment	13	17 January 1966	5 June 1967
3	Mordechai Tzipori	Likud	18, 19	28 June 1977	10 October 1983
4	Michael Dekel	Likud	21, 22	3 December 1985	21 November 1988
5	Ovadia Eli	Likud	24	8 July 1991	13 July 1992
6	Mordechai Gur	Labor Party	25	4 August 1992	16 July 1995
7	Ori Orr	Labor Party	26	27 November 1995	18 June 1996
8	Silvan Shalom	Likud	27	9 July 1997	6 July 1999
9	Efraim Sneh	One Israel	28	5 August 1999	7 March 2001
10	Dalia Rabin-Pelossof	Labor Party	29	7 March 2001	1 August 2002
11	Weizman Shiry	Labor Party	29	12 August 2002	2 November 2002
12	Ze'ev Boim	Likud; Kadima	30	5 March 2003	18 January 2006
–	Efraim Sneh	Labor Party	31	30 October 2006	18 June 2007
13	Matan Vilnai	Labor Party	31, 32	2 July 2007	18 January 2011
14	Danny Danon	Likud	33	18 March 2013	15 July 2014
15	Eli Ben-Dahan	The Jewish Home	34	19 May 2015	3 October 2019
16	Alon Schuster	Blue and White	36	28 June 2021	29 December 2022

== Directors General ==
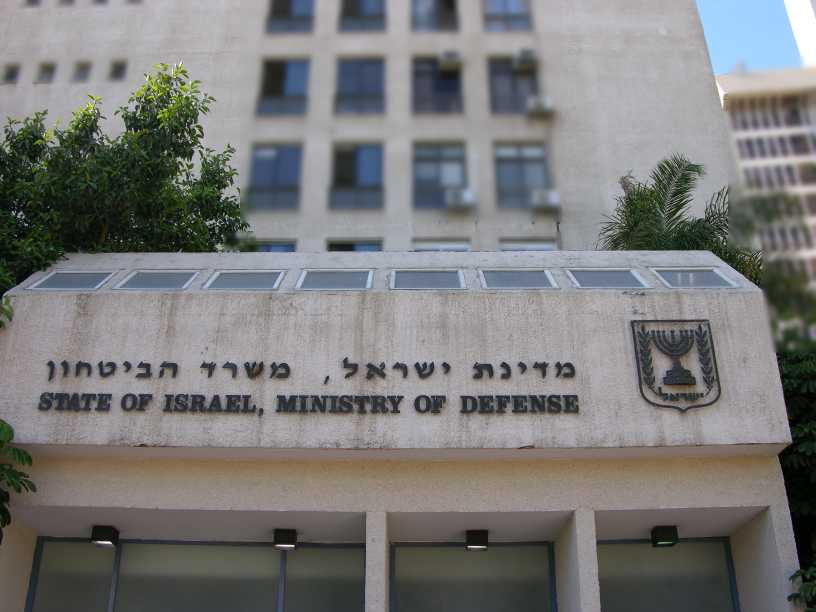
Ministry Of Defense

#	Director General	Term start	Term end
1	Levi Eshkol	1948	1948
2	Eliezer Peri	1948	1949
3	Pinchas Sapir	1949	1951
4	Ze'ev Schind	1951	1952
5	Shimon Peres	1952 (Note: Served in an acting capacity 1952-1953)	1959
6	Asher Ben-Natan	1959 (Note: Served in an acting capacity 1959-1960)	1965
7	Moshe Kasti	1965	1970
8	Yeshayahu Lavie	1970	1972
9	Yitzhak Ironi	1972	1975
10	Pinchas Zusman	1975	1978
11	Yosef Ma'ayan	1978	1981
12	Avraham Ben Yosef	1981	1982
13	Aharon Bet-Halachmi	1982	1983
14	Menachem Maron	1983	1986
15	David Ivry	1986	1996
16	Ilan Biran	1996	1999
17	Amos Yaron	1999	2005
18	Jacob Toren	2005	2006
19	Gabi Ashkenazi	2006	2007
20	Pinchas Buchris	2007	2010
21	Ehud Shani	2010	2013
22	Dan Harel	2013	2016
23	Udi Adam	2016	2020
24	Amir Eshel	2020	2023
25	Eyal Zamir	2023	2025
–	Itamar Graff (acting)	2025	2025
26	Amir Baram	2025	present

== IMOD Mission to the United States ==
The Israel Ministry of Defense Mission (IMOD) to the United States leads the Ministry’s procurement efforts, particularly those funded with Foreign Military Financing. It was established in New York City in 1947, prior to the foundation of the State of Israel, to perform procurement activities in anticipation of independence.

The mission is currently headed up by Col Aviram Hasson, who has highlighted the expansion of the military procurement program since 2023. By July 2024, he noted that the mission's annual budget for military procurement had more than doubled since the beginning of the war, including US$3.3–3.4 billion of its own funds for procurement from the United States suppliers, in addition to purchases supported by American military assistance.
