= Ministry of Foreign Affairs (Israel) =

Government ministry of Israel

Ministry of Foreign Affairs Israel
- משרד החוץ وزارة الخارجية الإسرائيلية
- Seal of the MFA

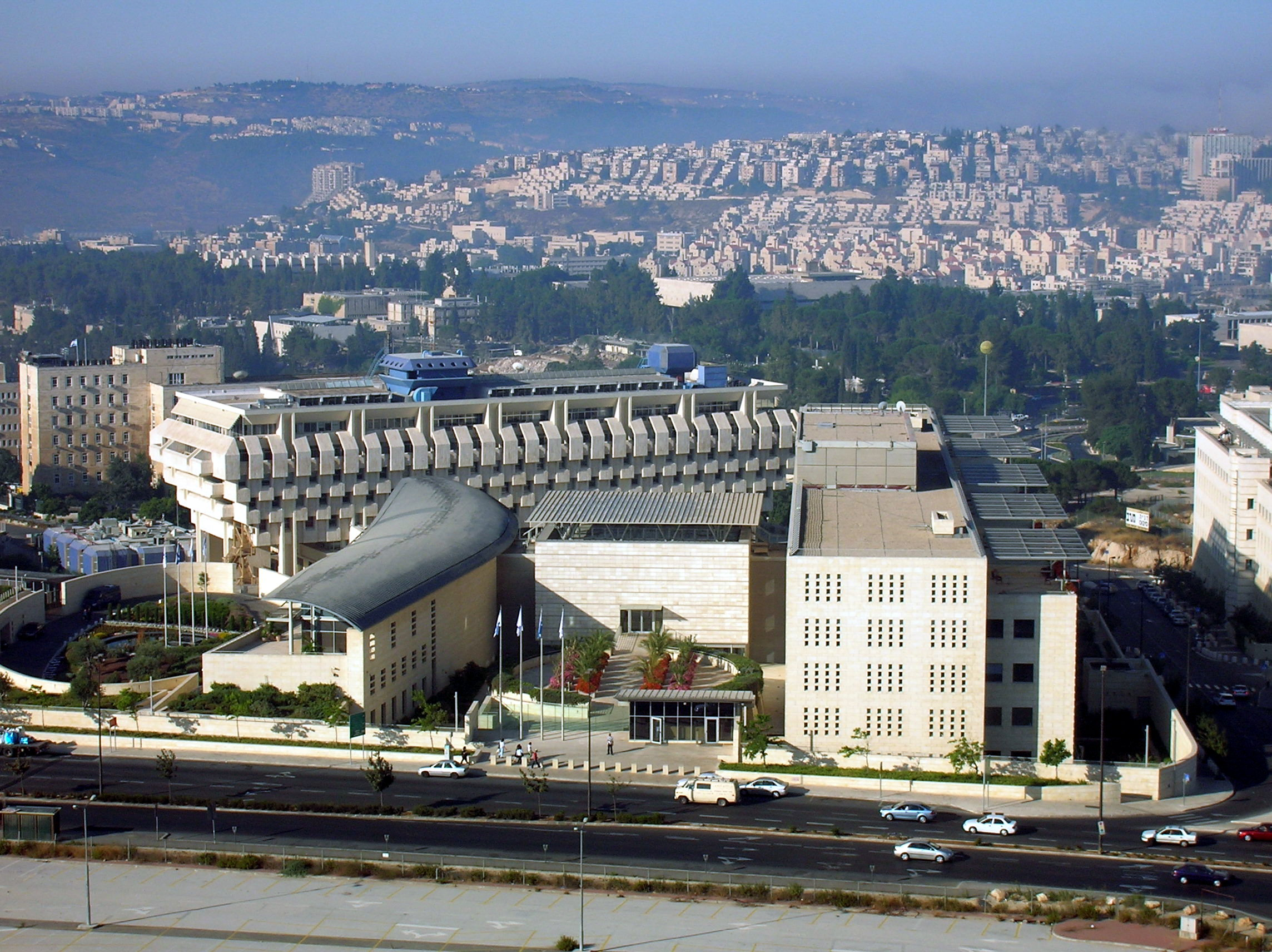
- Ministry of Foreign Affairs Headquarters at Kiryat HaLeom

Agency overview
- Formed: 1948
- Jurisdiction: Government of Israel
- Headquarters: Foreign Ministry Building, Givat Ram, Jerusalem; 31°46′57″N 35°12′04″E
- Minister responsible: Gideon Sa'ar
- Website: www.mfa.gov.il

The Israeli Ministry of Foreign Affairs (Hebrew: מִשְׂרַד הַחוּץ, romanized: Misrad HaHutz; Arabic: وزارة الخارجية الإسرائيلية) is one of the most important ministries in the Israeli government. The ministry's role is to implement Israel's foreign policy, and promote economic, cultural, and scientific relations with other countries.

The Ministry of Foreign Affairs is located in the government complex in Givat Ram, Jerusalem. Gideon Sa'ar currently holds the Foreign Ministry post.

== History ==
In the early months of 1948, when the government of the future State of Israel was being formed, the Ministry of Foreign Affairs was housed in a building in the abandoned Templer village of Sarona, on the outskirts of Tel Aviv. Moshe Sharett, formerly head of the Political Department of the Jewish Agency, was placed in charge of foreign relations, with Walter Eytan as Director General.

In November 2013, the longest labor dispute in the history of the Foreign Ministry's workers union came to an end when diplomats signed an agreement that would increase their salaries and improve their working conditions. A new organization was founded, the Israeli Association for Diplomacy, with the mission of promoting the interests of Foreign Ministry staff. In response to issues raised, MK Ronen Hoffman arranged for the Knesset to launch a caucus entitled the "Caucus for the strengthening of the foreign service and Israeli diplomacy" in December 2014. Joined by politicians across the political spectrum, Hoffman said, "As long as the security establishment and the army are preferred over the foreign service, national security is damaged. A country whose foreign service doesn't take a central position doesn't act in the best national interest."

== Diplomatic relations ==
Israel maintains diplomatic relations with 159 countries. It operates 77 embassies, 19 consulates-general and 5 special missions: a mission to the United Nations (New York), a mission to the United Nations institutions in Geneva, a mission to the United Nations institutions in Paris, a mission to the United Nations institutions in Vienna and an ambassador to the European Union (Brussels).

In October 2000, Morocco, Tunisia and the Sultanate of Oman closed the Israeli offices in their countries and suspended relations with Israel. Niger, which renewed relations with Israel in November 1996, severed them in April 2002. Venezuela and Bolivia severed diplomatic ties with Israel in January 2009, in the wake of the 2008–2009 Gaza War.

== Foreign ministry building ==
The new building of the Israeli Ministry of Foreign Affairs in Kiryat Ben-Gurion, the government complex near the Knesset, was designed by Jerusalem architects Kolker, Kolker and Epstein in association with Diamond, Donald, Schmidt & Co. of Toronto. The building consists of three wings: One houses the offices of the Foreign Minister and director-general, another houses the diplomatic corps and the library, and the third is used for receptions. The outside walls of the reception hall incorporate onyx plates that diffuse an amber light. In June 2001, the design won the prize for excellence from the Royal Institute of Architects of Canada. The building is described as a "sophisticated essay in the play between solid and void, mass and volume, and light and shadow."

== List of ministers ==
The Foreign Affairs Minister of Israel (Hebrew: שר החוץ, Sar HaHutz) is the political head of the Israeli Ministry of Foreign Affairs. The position is one of the most important in the Israeli cabinet after Prime Minister and Defense Minister.

#	Minister	Party	Governments	Term start	Term end	Notes
1	Moshe Sharett	Mapai	P, 1, 2, 3, 4, 5, 6, 7	15 May 1948	18 June 1956	Serving Prime Minister 1954–1955
2	Golda Meir	Mapai; Alignment	7, 8, 9, 10, 11, 12	18 June 1956	12 January 1966	
3	Abba Eban	Alignment; Labor Party; Alignment	13, 14, 15, 16	13 January 1966	2 June 1974	
4	Yigal Allon	Alignment	17	3 June 1974	19 June 1977	
5	Moshe Dayan	Independent	18	20 June 1977	23 October 1979	
6	Menachem Begin	Likud	18	23 October 1979	10 March 1980	Serving Prime Minister
7	Yitzhak Shamir	Likud	18, 19, 20, 21	10 March 1980	20 October 1986	Serving Prime Minister 1983–1984
8	Shimon Peres	Alignment	22	20 October 1986	23 December 1988	
9	Moshe Arens	Likud	23	23 December 1988	12 June 1990	
10	David Levy	Likud	24	13 June 1990	13 July 1992	
–	Shimon Peres	Labor Party	25	14 July 1992	22 November 1995	
11	Ehud Barak	Labor Party	26	22 November 1995	18 June 1996	Not a Knesset member
–	David Levy	Gesher	27	18 June 1996	6 January 1998	
12	Benjamin Netanyahu	Likud	27	6 January 1998	13 October 1998	Serving Prime Minister
13	Ariel Sharon	Likud	27	13 October 1998	6 June 1999	
–	David Levy	One Israel	28	6 June 1999	4 August 2000	
–	Ehud Barak	One Israel	28	4 August 2000	10 August 2000	Serving Prime Minister
14	Shlomo Ben-Ami	One Israel	28	10 August 2000	7 March 2001	
–	Shimon Peres	Labor Party	29	7 March 2001	2 October 2002	
–	Ariel Sharon	Likud	29	2 October 2002	6 November 2002	Serving Prime Minister
–	Benjamin Netanyahu	Likud	29	6 November 2002	28 February 2003	
15	Silvan Shalom	Likud	30	28 February 2003	16 January 2006	
16	Tzipi Livni	Kadima	31	18 January 2006	1 April 2009	
17	Avigdor Lieberman	Yisrael Beiteinu	32	1 April 2009	18 December 2012	
–	Benjamin Netanyahu	Likud	32, 33	18 December 2012	11 November 2013	Serving Prime Minister
–	Avigdor Lieberman	Yisrael Beiteinu	33	11 November 2013	6 May 2015	
–	Benjamin Netanyahu	Likud	34	14 May 2015	17 February 2019	Serving Prime Minister
18	Israel Katz	Likud	34	17 February 2019	17 May 2020	
19	Gabi Ashkenazi	Blue and White	35	17 May 2020	13 June 2021	
20	Yair Lapid	Yesh Atid	36	13 June 2021	29 December 2022	Serving Prime Minister
21	Eli Cohen	Likud	37	29 December 2022	1 January 2024	
–	Israel Katz	Likud	37	1 January 2024	5 November 2024	
22	Gideon Sa'ar	New Hope	37	5 November 2024		

=== Deputy ministers ===
#	Minister	Party	Governments	Term start	Term end
1	Yehuda Ben-Meir	National Religious Party; Gesher ZRC	19, 20	11 August 1981	13 September 1984
2	Roni Milo	Likud	21	24 September 1984	20 October 1986
3	Benjamin Netanyahu	Likud	23, 24	26 December 1988	11 November 1991
4	Yossi Beilin	Labor Party	25	4 August 1992	17 July 1995
5	Eli Dayan	Labor Party	26	24 July 1995	18 June 1996
6	Nawaf Massalha	One Israel	28	5 August 1999	7 March 2001
7	Michael Melchior	Meimad	29	7 March 2001	26 March 2001
8	Majalli Wahabi	Kadima	31	29 October 2007	31 March 2009
9	Danny Ayalon	Yisrael Beiteinu	32	31 March 2009	18 March 2013
10	Ze'ev Elkin	Likud	33	18 March 2013	12 May 2014
11	Tzachi Hanegbi	Likud	33	2 June 2014	6 May 2015
12	Tzipi Hotovely	Likud	34	19 May 2015	21 April 2020
13	Idan Roll	Yesh Atid	36	12 June 2021	29 December 2022

== See also ==
- Foreign relations of Israel
