= Shmuel Avital =

Israeli politician

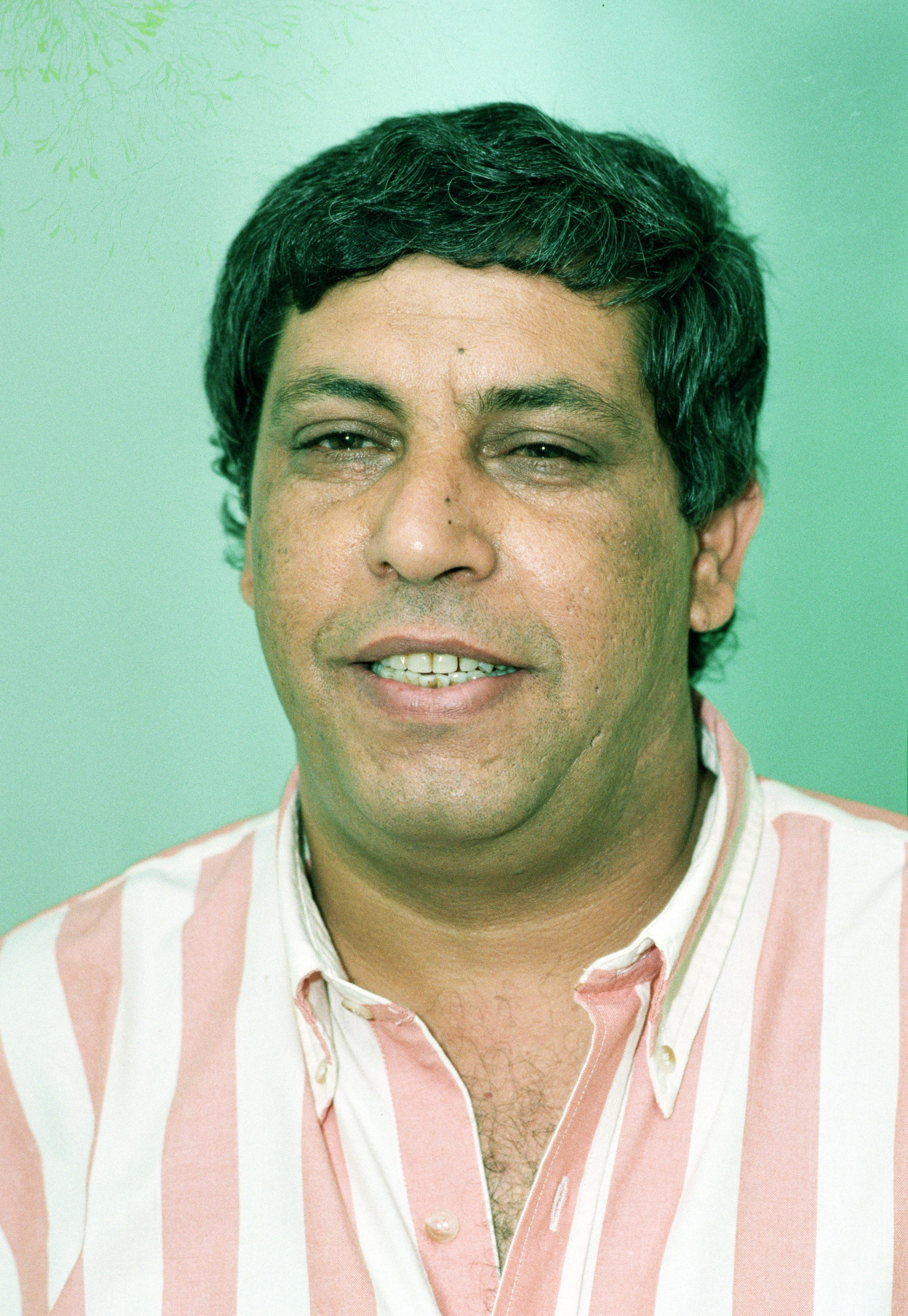
- Avital in 1992

Ministerial roles
- 2001–2002: Minister without Portfolio

Faction represented in the Knesset
- 1992–1996: Labor Party

Personal details
- Born: 24 May 1951 (age 75) Casablanca, Morocco

Shmuel Avital (Hebrew: שמואל אביטל; born 24 May 1951) is an Israeli former politician who served as a minister without portfolio responsible for social coordination from March 2001 until February 2002.

== Biography ==
Born in Casablanca in Morocco, Avital emigrated to Israel in 1953. He studied at Ben-Gurion University of the Negev in Beersheba and worked in agriculture.

In 1992 he was elected to the Knesset on the Labor Party's list. However, he lost his seat in the 1996 elections. Despite not being a member of the Knesset, in March 2001 he was appointed minister without portfolio responsible for social co-ordination in Ariel Sharon's national unity government. However, he resigned in February the following year.
