= Twenty-eighth government of Israel =

1999–2001 government led by Ehud Barak

Barak cabinet
- 28th Cabinet of Israel

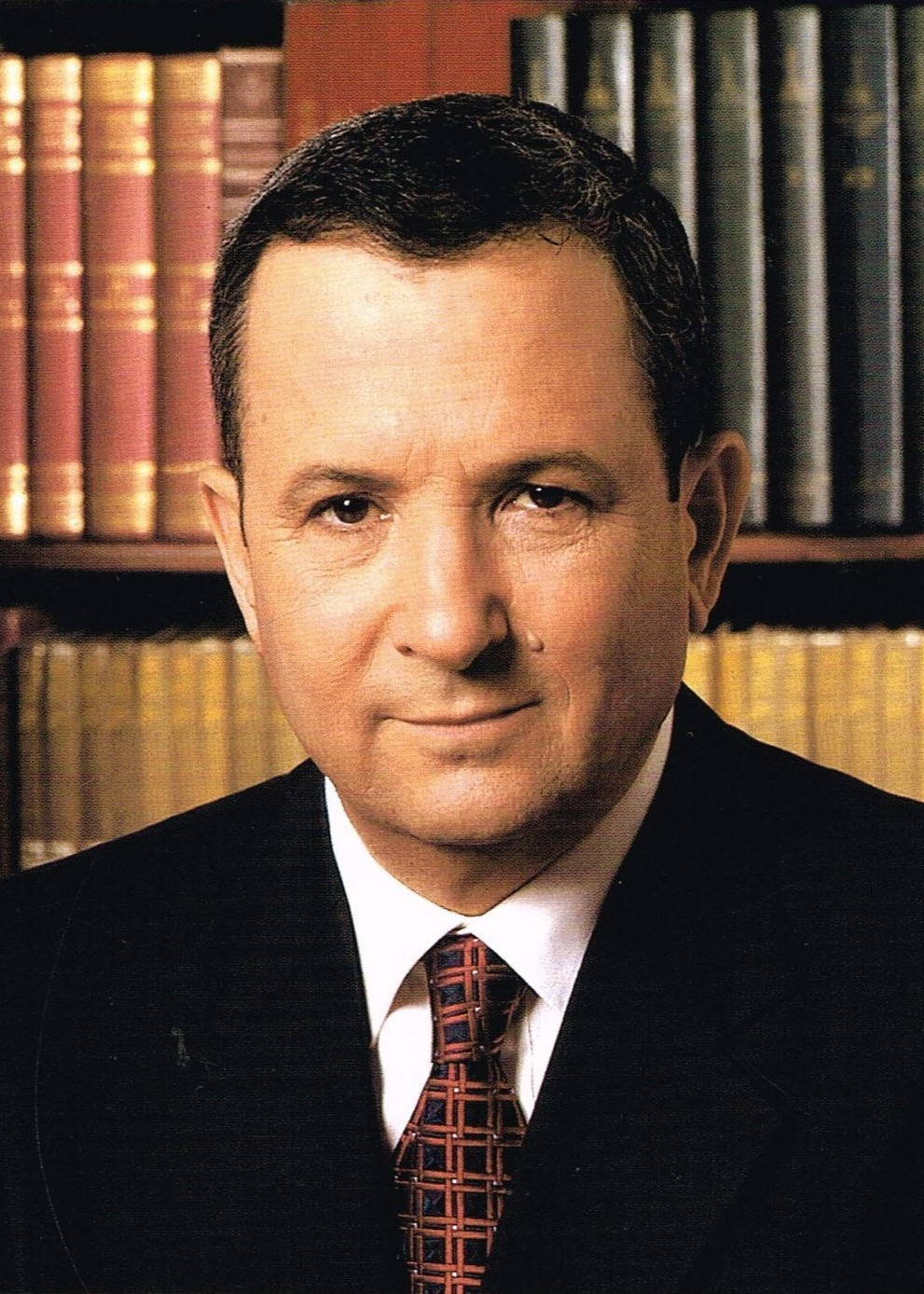
- Date formed: 6 July 1999
- Date dissolved: 7 March 2001

People and organisations
- Head of state: Ezer Weizman (until 13 July 2000); Moshe Katzav (from 1 August 2000)
- Head of government: Ehud Barak
- Member parties: One Israel; Centre Party; Gesher; Shas; Meretz; National Religious Party; Yisrael BaAliyah; United Torah Judaism (until September 1999)
- Status in legislature: Coalition government
- Opposition leader: Ariel Sharon

History
- Election: 1999
- Legislature term: 15th Knesset
- Predecessor: 27th government
- Successor: 29th government

The twenty-eighth government of Israel was formed by Ehud Barak of One Israel on 6 July 1999 after his victory in the May election for Prime Minister. Alongside One Israel (an alliance of the Labor Party, Meimad and Gesher), Barak included Shas, Meretz, Yisrael BaAliyah, the Centre Party, the National Religious Party and United Torah Judaism in his coalition. The parties formed a center-left coalition. United Torah Judaism left the government in September 1999 due to a dispute over the transport of a turbine on Shabbat.

Following the outbreak of the Al-Aqsa Intifada, the government began to fall apart. Barak called a special election for Prime Minister in February 2001, which he lost to Likud leader Ariel Sharon. Sharon went on to form the twenty-ninth government on 7 March.

Israeli government formation, 1999
- 6 July 1999
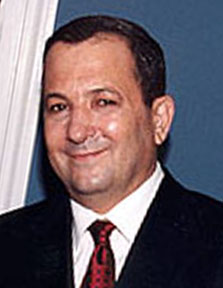

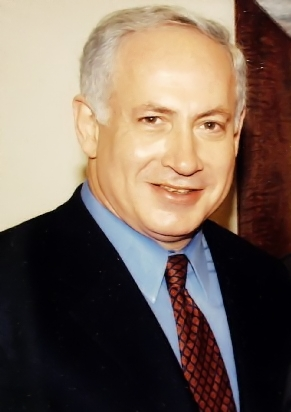
Nominee	Ehud Barak	Benjamin Netanyahu
Party	One Israel	Likud
Popular vote	1,791,020	1,402,474
Percentage	56.1%	43.9%
Prime Minister before election
Benjamin Netanyahu
Likud
Elected Prime Minister
Ehud Barak
One Israel

== Cabinet members ==
Position	Person	Party
Prime Minister	Ehud Barak	One Israel
Deputy Prime Minister	Yitzhak Mordechai (until 20 May 2000)	Centre Party
Deputy Prime Minister	David Levy (until 4 August 2000)	Gesher
Deputy Prime Minister	Binyamin Ben-Eliezer	One Israel
Minister in the Prime Minister's Office	Haim Ramon	One Israel
Minister of Agriculture	Haim Oron (5 August 1999 - 24 June 2000)	Meretz
Minister of Agriculture	Ehud Barak (from 24 June 2000)	One Israel
Minister of Communications	Binyamin Ben-Eliezer	One Israel
Minister of Defense	Ehud Barak	One Israel
Minister of Education, Culture and Sport	Yossi Sarid (until 24 June 2000)	Meretz
Minister of Education, Culture and Sport	Ehud Barak (from 24 September 2000)	One Israel
Minister of the Environment	Dalia Itzik	One Israel
Minister of Finance	Avraham Shochat	One Israel
Minister of Foreign Affairs	David Levy (until 4 August 2000)	One Israel
Minister of Foreign Affairs	Shlomo Ben Ami (from 2 November 2000)	One Israel
Minister of Health	Shlomo Benizri (until 11 July 2000)	Shas
Minister of Health	Roni Milo (from 10 August 2000)	Centre Party
Minister of Housing and Construction	Yitzhak Levy (until 12 July 2000)	National Religious Party
Minister of Housing and Construction	Binyamin Ben-Eliezer (from 11 October 2000)	One Israel
Minister of Immigrant Absorption	Ehud Barak (until 5 August 1999)	One Israel
Minister of Immigrant Absorption	Yuli Tamir (from 5 August 1999)	Not an MK ^{1}
Minister of Industry and Trade	Ran Cohen (until 24 June 2000)	Meretz
Minister of Industry and Trade	Ehud Barak (from 24 September 2000)	One Israel
Minister of Internal Affairs	Natan Sharansky (until 11 July 2000)	Yisrael BaAliyah
Minister of Internal Affairs	Haim Ramon (from 11 October 2000)	One Israel
Minister of Internal Security	Shlomo Ben-Ami	One Israel
Minister of Justice	Yossi Beilin	One Israel
Minister of Labour and Social Welfare	Eli Yishai (until 11 July 2000)	Shas
Minister of Labour and Social Welfare	Ra'anan Cohen (from 10 August 2000)	One Israel
Minister of National Infrastructure	Eli Suissa (until 11 July 2000)	Shas
Minister of National Infrastructure	Avraham Shochat (from 11 October 2000)	One Israel
Minister of Regional Co-operation	Shimon Peres	One Israel
Minister of Religious Affairs	Yitzhak Cohen (until 11 July 2000)	Shas
Minister of Religious Affairs	Yossi Beilin (from 11 October 2000)	One Israel
Minister of Science ^{2}	Ehud Barak (until 5 August 1999)	One Israel
Minister of Science ^{2}	Matan Vilnai (from 5 August 1999)	One Israel
Minister of Social and Diaspora Affairs	Michael Melchior	One Israel
Minister of Tourism	Ehud Barak (until 5 August 1999)	One Israel
Minister of Tourism	Amnon Lipkin-Shahak (from 5 August 1999)	Center Party
Minister of Transportation	Yitzhak Mordechai (until 30 May 2000)	Centre Party
Minister of Transportation	Amnon Lipkin-Shahak (from 11 October 2000)	Center Party
Deputy Minister of Communications	Yitzhak Vaknin (until 11 July 2000)	Shas
Deputy Minister of Defense	Efraim Sneh	One Israel
Deputy Minister of Education	Meshulam Nahari (until 11 July 2000)	Shas
Deputy Minister of Education	Shaul Yahalom (until 12 July 2000)	National Religious Party
Deputy Minister of Finance	Nissim Dahan (until 11 July 2000)	Shas
Deputy Minister of Foreign Affairs	Nawaf Massalha	One Israel
Deputy Minister of Immigrant Absorption	Marina Solodkin (until 11 July 2000)	Yisrael BaAliyah
Deputy Minister of Religious Affairs	Yigal Bibi (until 12 July 2000)	National Religious Party

^{1} Although Tamir was not a Knesset member at the time, she was later elected to the Knesset on the Labor Party list.

^{2} The name of the post was changed to Minister of Science, Culture and Sport when Vilnai took office.
