= Regional Cooperation Minister of Israel =

Israeli ministerial post

- המשרד לפיתוח אזורי

Agency overview
- Formed: 1999
- Jurisdiction: Government of Israel
- Minister responsible: Dudi Amsalem
- Agency executive: Gilad Shadmon, Director-General
- Website: www.morc.gov.il

The Regional Development Minister (Hebrew: הֲשַׂר לְפִּתּוּחַ אֲזוֹרִי, Sar LePituah Azori) is a member of the Israeli government. Created in 1999 during Ehud Barak's government, the ministry was closed by Ariel Sharon in 2003. However, it was recreated in 2009 by Benjamin Netanyahu.

== List of ministers ==
#	Name	Party	Government	Term start	Term end	Notes
1	Shimon Peres	One Israel	28	6 July 1999	7 March 2001	
2	Tzipi Livni	Likud	29	7 March 2001	29 August 2001	
3	Roni Milo	Centre Party	29	29 August 2001	28 February 2003	
4	Silvan Shalom	Likud	32, 33	31 March 2009	14 May 2015	
5	Benjamin Netanyahu	Likud	34	14 May 2015	26 December 2016	Serving Prime Minister
6	Tzachi Hanegbi	Likud	34	26 December 2016	17 May 2020	
7	Gilad Erdan	Likud	35	17 May 2020	5 July 2020	
8	Ofir Akunis	Likud	35	5 July 2020	13 June 2021	
9	Issawi Frej	Meretz	36	13 June 2021	29 December 2022	
10	Yoav Kisch	Likud	37	29 December 2022	12 February 2023	
11	Dudi Amsalem	Likud	37	12 February 2023		

=== Deputy ministers ===
#	Name	Party	Government	Term start	Term end
1	Ayoob Kara	Likud	34	19 May 2015	20 January 2017
