= Ministry of Agriculture and Food Security (Israel) =

Government ministry of Israel

- משרד החקלאות וביטחון המזון; Misrad HaHakla'ut UBithon Hamazon
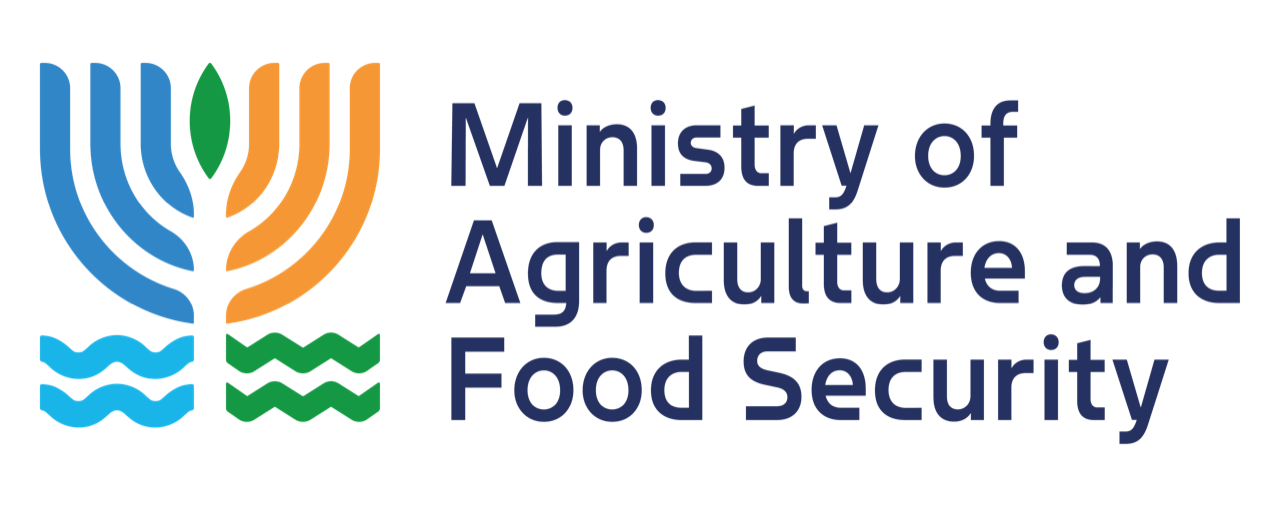

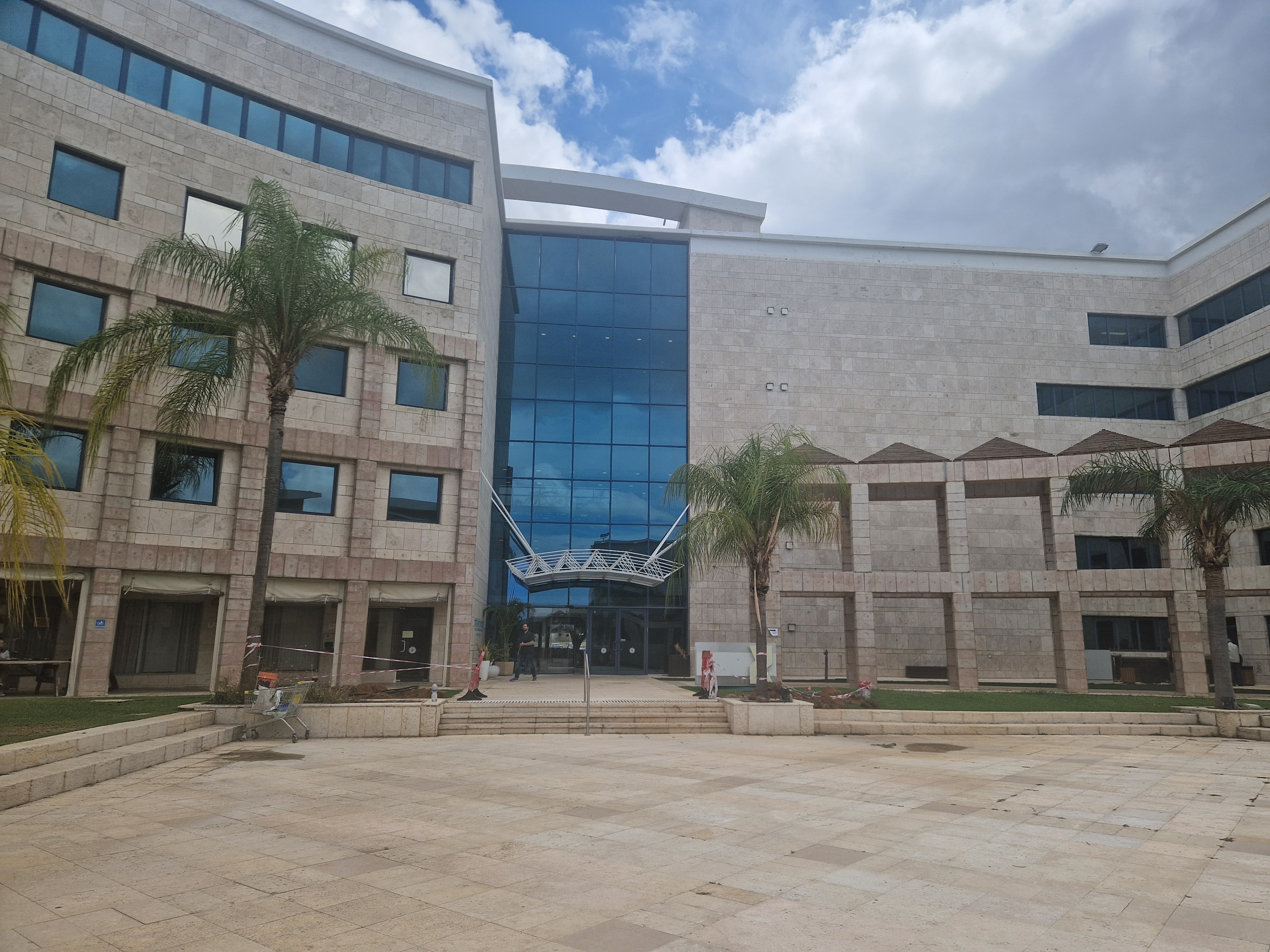

Agency overview
- Formed: 1948
- Jurisdiction: Government of Israel
- Minister responsible: Avi Dichter
- Agency executive: Oren Lavi, Director-General
- Website: www.moag.gov.il/en

The Ministry of Agriculture and Food Security of Israel (Hebrew: משרד החקלאות וביטחון המזון, Misrad HaHakla'ut UBithon Hamazon) is the ministry of the Israeli government that oversees the country's agricultural industry. The ministry was originally called the Ministry of Agriculture but in 1992 the title was changed to the Ministry of Agriculture and Rural Development. The Development Ministry, which oversaw rural development, was abolished in 1974. In 2024 the title was changed to its current one.

== List of ministers ==
The Agriculture and Food Security Minister (Hebrew: שר החקלאות וביטחון המזון, Sar HaHakla'ut UBithon Hamazon; Arabic: وزير الزراعة وتطوير القرية) is the political head of the ministry, considered a relatively minor position in the Israel cabinet. Two serving Prime Ministers, Menachem Begin and Ehud Barak, also served as agriculture ministers; Begin following the death of the incumbent, and Barak following the resignation of the former minister's party from his coalition. There is occasionally a Deputy Minister of Agriculture.

#	Minister	Party	Governments	Term start	Term end	Notes
Minister of Agriculture
1	Aharon Zisling	Mapam	Provisional	14 May 1948	10 March 1949	
2	Dov Yosef	Mapai	1	1 June 1949	1 November 1950	
3	Pinhas Lavon	Mapai	2	November 1, 1950	October 8, 1951	
4	Levi Eshkol	Mapai	3	October 8, 1951	June 25, 1952	
5	Peretz Naftali	Mapai	3, 4, 5, 6	June 25, 1952	November 3, 1955	
6	Kadish Luz	Mapai	7, 8	November 3, 1955	December 17, 1959	
7	Moshe Dayan	Mapai	9, 10, 11	December 17, 1959	November 4, 1964	
8	Haim Gvati	Mapai, Alignment	11, 12, 13, 14, 15, 16	November 9, 1964	June 3, 1974	Not a Knesset member for part of term in office
9	Aharon Uzan	Alignment	17	June 3, 1974	June 20, 1977	Not a Knesset Member
10	Ariel Sharon	Likud	18	June 20, 1977	August 5, 1981	
11	Simha Erlich	Likud	19	August 5, 1981	June 19, 1983	Died in office
12	Menachem Begin	Likud	19	June 19, 1983	October 10, 1983	Also serving prime minister
13	Pesah Grupper	Likud	20	October 10, 1983	September 13, 1984	
14	Aryeh Nehemkin	Alignment	21, 22	September 13, 1984	December 22, 1988	
15	Avraham Katz-Oz	Alignment	23	December 22, 1988	March 15, 1990	
16	Rafael Eitan	Tzomet	24	June 11, 1990	December 31, 1991	
Minister of Agriculture and Rural Development
17	Ya'akov Tzur	Labor Party	25, 26	July 13, 1992	June 18, 1996	
–	Rafael Eitan	Tzomet	27	June 18, 1996	July 6, 1999	
18	Haim Oron	Meretz	28	August 5, 1999	June 24, 2000	
19	Ehud Barak	Labor Party	28	June 24, 2000	March 7, 2001	Also serving prime minister
20	Shalom Simhon	Labor Party	29	March 7, 2001	November 2, 2002	
21	Tzipi Livni	Likud	29	December 17, 2002	February 28, 2003	
22	Yisrael Katz	Likud	30	February 28, 2003	January 14, 2006	
23	Ze'ev Boim	Kadima	30	January 18, 2006	May 4, 2006	
–	Shalom Simhon	Labor Party	31, 32	4 May 2006	18 January 2011	
24	Orit Noked	Independence	32	18 January 2011	18 March 2013	
25	Yair Shamir	Yisrael Beiteinu	33	18 March 2013	14 May 2015	
26	Uri Ariel	The Jewish Home	34	14 May 2015	15 November 2019	
27	Tzachi Hanegbi	Likud	34	20 January 2020	17 May 2020	
28	Alon Schuster	Blue and White	35	17 May 2020	13 June 2021	
29	Oded Forer	Yisrael Beiteinu	36	13 June 2021	29 December 2022	
30	Avi Dichter	Likud	37	29 December 2022	30 June 2024	
Minister of Agriculture and Food Security
30	Avi Dichter	Likud	37	30 June 2024		

=== Deputy ministers ===
#	Minister	Party	Governments	Term start	Term end
1	Yosef Efrati	Mapai	3	9 July 1952	24 December 1952
2	Ze'ev Tzur	Ahdut HaAvoda	7, 8	5 December 1955	17 December 1959
3	Aharon Uzan	Alignment	13, 14	17 January 1966	17 March 1969
4	Ben-Zion Halfon	Alignment	15	22 December 1969	10 March 1974
5	Jabr Muadi	Alignment, Progress and Development, United Arab List	17	24 March 1975	20 June 1977
6	Pesah Grupper	Likud	19	11 August 1981	10 October 1983
7	Michael Dekel	Likud	20	10 October 1983	13 September 1984
8	Avraham Katz-Oz	Alignment	21, 22	24 September 1984	22 December 1988
9	Walid Haj Yahia	Meretz	25, 26	4 August 1992	18 June 1996
10	Gila Gamliel	Likud	30	30 March 2005	14 January 2006
11	Moshe Abutbul	Shas	37	4 January 2023	20 July 2025

== Units ==
- Plant Protection and Inspection Services

== Insurance ==
Agricultural insurance in the country is provided by KANAT, the Insurance Fund for Natural Risks in Agriculture. It is jointly owned by the government and the farm marketing boards, and overseen by the Ministry. The KANAT Award[he:קטגוריה:זוכי אות קנט] is given for agricultural research.
