= Ministry of Transport and Road Safety =

Government ministry of Israel

Ministry of Transport, National Infrastructure and Road Safety Israel
- משרד התחבורה, התשתיות הלאומיות והבטיחות בדרכים وزارة المواصلات والأمان على الطريق
- Ministry emblem

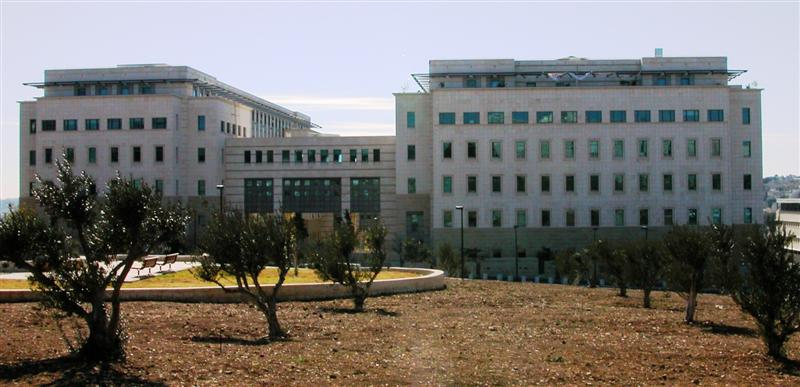
- Ministry of Transport, National Infrastructure and Road Safety Headquarters

Agency overview
- Formed: 1948
- Preceding agencies: Ministry of Transport; Ministry of Transport and Road Safety
- Jurisdiction: Government of Israel
- Headquarters: Transport, National Infrastructure and Road Safety Building, Givat Ram, Jerusalem
- Annual budget: 452 million New Shekel
- Minister responsible: Miri Regev
- Website: www.mot.gov.il

The Ministry of Transport, National Infrastructure and Road Safety (MOT) (Hebrew: משרד התחבורה, התשתיות הלאומיות והבטיחות בדרכים, Arabic: وزارة المواصلات والأمان على الطريق) is a government agency that handles transportation and road safety issues in Israel. The ministry headquarters are in Givat Ram, Jerusalem.

== Functions and structure ==
The Ministry of Transport handles road safety; operation of traffic services; and maintaining international air, sea, and overland links. Land transport departments include the Licensing Division, Vehicles Division, Traffic Division, Road Safety Administration, and Financial Supervision Division. The Shipping and Ports Administration handles maritime transport, and the Civil Aviation Administration handles air transport. The Israel Meteorological Service covers all three areas. Units subordinate to the director-general include Planning and Economics, Legal Counsel, Public Relations, Internal Auditing, Finance, and Emergency Arrangements. The Israel Airports Authority and the Ports and Railways Authority have a special status as corporations established by law.

The Planning and Economics Division coordinates transport policy, work plans, budgets, and funding; sets policy on prices, levies, and fees; monitors the administration of the Airports Authority and the Ports and Railways Authority; coordinates information systems and transportation research; and oversees physical planning and monitoring of master plans.

== Development plans ==
In 2010, Nir Barkat, mayor of Jerusalem, unveiled a NIS 8 billion transportation plan for the city drawn up in collaboration with the Transport Ministry. The plan includes a new light rail line, extensions of the first phase of the red line now under construction, a series of Bus Rapid Transit (BRT) routes and five new roads.

In 2021 the new minister Merav Michaeli announced a shift in focus declaring "Over the years, planning was done here from a perspective that placed private vehicles in the center. We are turning this around completely and making private vehicles the lowest priority, and as a top priority we are placing the citizens as pedestrians, so there will be as much motivation as possible to walk on foot and ride bicycles, and for it to be possible to take public transportation as much as possible, quickly and efficiently, and for it to be pleasant for us to do this."

== List of ministers ==
The Minister of Transport, National Infrastructure and Road Safety (Hebrew: שר התחבורה, התשתיות הלאומיות והבטיחות בדרכים, Sar HaTahbura, HaTashtiyot HaLe'umiyot VeHaBetihut BaDrakhim), formerly Minister of Transport, heads the ministry. A relatively minor post in the Israeli cabinet, it is often given to smaller parties in the governing coalitions. Nevertheless, there has been a Minister of Transport in every Israeli government to date. Miri Regev of the governing Likud party is the incumbent.

Three Prime Ministers (David Ben-Gurion, Menachem Begin and Ariel Sharon) have held the transport portfolio whilst in office, though only for a short time, whilst three Ministers of Transport (Ezer Weizman, Moshe Katsav and Shimon Peres) had gone on to become President.

There is also occasionally a Deputy Minister of Transport.

#	Minister	Party	Government	Term start	Term end	Notes
Minister of Transportation
1	David Remez	Mapai	P, 1	May 14, 1948	November 1, 1950	
2	Dov Yosef	Mapai	2	November 1, 1950	October 8, 1951	
3	David-Zvi Pinkas	Mizrachi	3	October 8, 1951	August 14, 1952	Died in office
4	David Ben-Gurion	Mapai	3	August 14, 1952	December 24, 1952	Serving Prime Minister
5	Yosef Serlin	General Zionists	4	December 24, 1952	December 29, 1952	
6	Yosef Sapir	General Zionists	4, 5	December 29, 1952	June 29, 1955	
7	Zalman Aran	Mapai	6	June 29, 1955	November 3, 1955	
8	Moshe Carmel	Ahdut HaAvoda	7, 8	November 3, 1955	December 17, 1959	Not an MK until 9 June 1958
9	Yitzhak Ben-Aharon	Ahdut HaAvoda	9, 10	December 17, 1959	May 28, 1962	
10	Yisrael Bar-Yehuda	Ahdut HaAvoda	10, 11, 12	May 28, 1962	May 4, 1965	Died in office
–	Moshe Carmel	Ahdut HaAvoda; Alignment; Labor Party; Alignment	12, 13, 14	May 30, 1965	December 15, 1969	Not an MK after 17 March 1969
11	Ezer Weizman	Not an MK	15	December 15, 1969	August 6, 1970	
12	Shimon Peres	Alignment	15	September 1, 1970	March 10, 1974	
13	Aharon Yariv	Alignment	16	March 10, 1974	June 3, 1974	
14	Gad Yaacobi	Alignment	17	June 3, 1974	June 20, 1977	
15	Menahem Begin	Likud	18	June 20, 1977	October 24, 1977	Serving Prime Minister
16	Meir Amit	Democratic Movement for Change	18	October 24, 1977	September 15, 1978	
17	Haim Landau	Not an MK	18	January 15, 1979	August 5, 1981	
18	Haim Corfo	Likud	19, 20, 21, 22	August 5, 1981	December 22, 1988	
19	Moshe Katsav	Likud	23, 24	December 22, 1988	July 13, 1992	
20	Yisrael Kessar	Labor Party	25, 26	July 13, 1992	June 18, 1996	
21	Yitzhak Levy	National Religious Party	27	June 18, 1996	February 25, 1998	
22	Shaul Yahalom	National Religious Party	27	February 25, 1998	July 6, 1999	
23	Yitzhak Mordechai	Centre Party	28	July 6, 1999	May 30, 2000	
24	Amnon Lipkin-Shahak	Centre Party	28	October 11, 2000	March 7, 2001	
25	Ephraim Sneh	Labor Party	29	March 7, 2001	November 2, 2002	
26	Ariel Sharon	Likud	29	November 2, 2002	December 15, 2002	Serving Prime Minister
27	Tzachi Hanegbi	Likud	29	December 15, 2002	February 28, 2003	
29	Avigdor Lieberman	National Union	30	February 28, 2003	June 6, 2004	
30	Meir Sheetrit	Likud	30	August 31, 2004	May 4, 2006	
Minister of Transportation and Road Safety
31	Shaul Mofaz	Kadima	31	May 4, 2006	March 31, 2009	
Minister of Transportation, National Infrastructure and Road Safety
32	Yisrael Katz	Likud	32	31 March 2009	18 March 2013	
Minister of Transportation and Road Safety
–	Yisrael Katz	Likud	33, 34	18 March 2013	17 June 2019	
33	Bezalel Smotrich	Union of the Right-Wing Parties	34	17 June 2019	17 May 2020	
34	Miri Regev	Likud	35	17 May 2020	13 June 2021	
35	Merav Michaeli	Labor Party	36	13 June 2021	29 December 2022	
–	Miri Regev	Likud	37	29 December 2022		

=== List of deputy ministers ===
#	Minister	Party	Government	Term start	Term end	Notes
1	Reuven Shari	Mapai	2	April 2, 1951	October 8, 1951	
2	Gad Yaacobi	Alignment	15	November 2, 1972	March 10, 1974	
3	David Shiffman	Likud	19	August 11, 1981	October 18, 1982	Died in office
4	Pinhas Goldstein	New Liberal Party	24	July 2, 1990	November 20, 1990	
5	Efraim Gur	Unity for Peace and Immigration; Likud	24	November 20, 1990	July 13, 1992	
6	Avraham Yehezkel	Labor Party	29	March 7, 2001	November 2, 2002	
7	Sofa Landver	Labor Party	29	August 12, 2002	November 2, 2002	
8	Shmuel Halpert	Agudat Yisrael	30	March 30, 2005	May 4, 2006	
9	Tzipi Hotovely	Likud	33	18 March 2013	14 May 2015	
10	Uri Maklev	United Torah Judaism	35	25 May 2020	13 June 2021	
