= Twenty-ninth government of Israel =

2001–03 government led by Ariel Sharon

First Sharon Cabinet
- 29th Cabinet of Israel

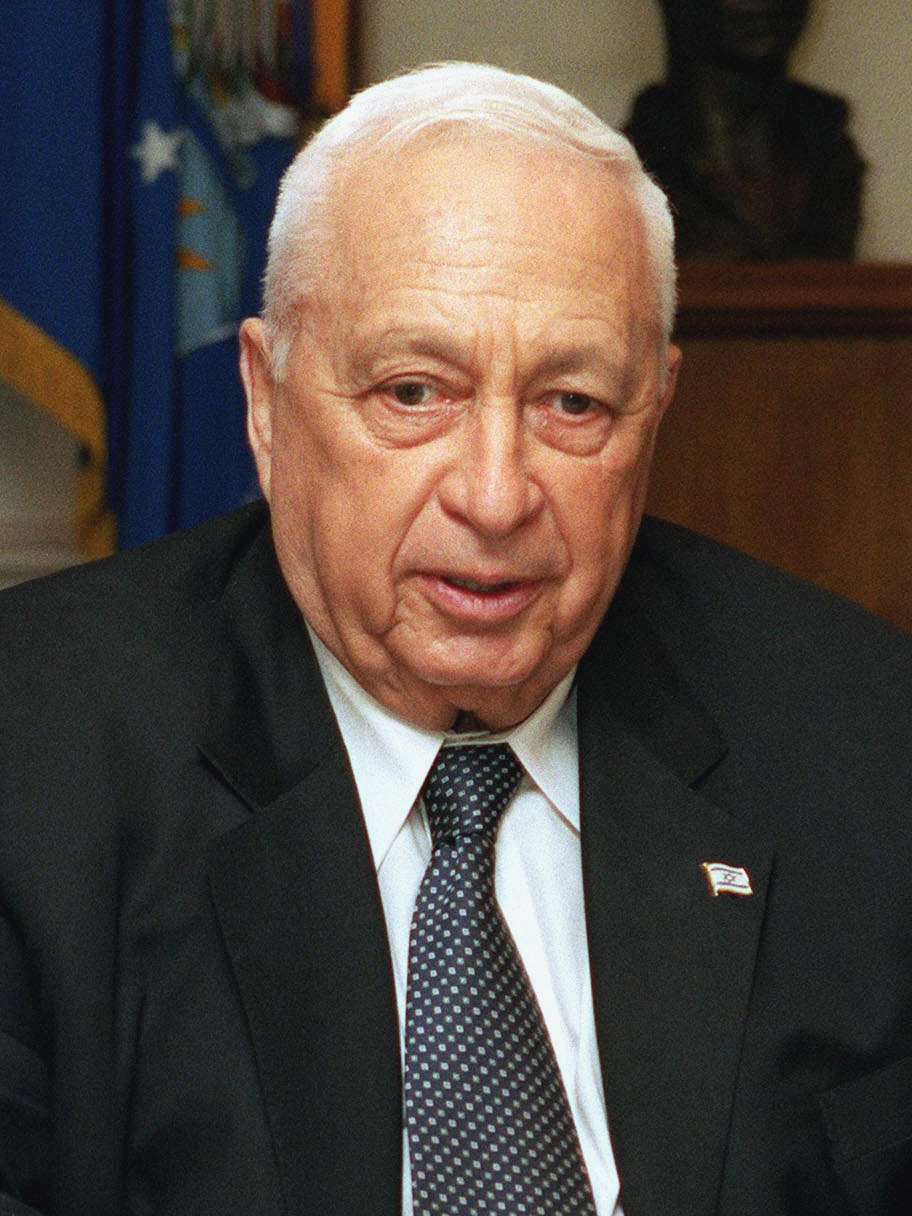
- Date formed: 7 March 2001
- Date dissolved: 28 February 2003

People and organisations
- Head of state: Moshe Katzav
- Head of government: Ariel Sharon
- Member parties: Likud; Labor-Meimad (until 2 November 2002); Shas; Yisrael BaAliyah; Yisrael Beiteinu; Centre Party; National Union; Gesher; New Way; United Torah Judaism
- Status in legislature: Coalition government
- Opposition leader: Yossi Sarid (until 2 November 2002); Binyamin Ben-Eliezer (after 2 November 2002)

History
- Election: 2001 Israeli prime ministerial election
- Legislature term: 15th Knesset
- Predecessor: 28th government of Israel
- Successor: 30th government of Israel

The twenty-ninth government of Israel was formed by Ariel Sharon on 7 March 2001, following his victory over Ehud Barak in the special election for Prime Minister in February. It was the first, and to date only time an election for Prime Minister was held without parallel elections for the Knesset, and one of the first acts of the new government was to repeal the law which introduced separate elections. Despite his large margin of victory in the election, because there had been no Knesset elections, Sharon's Likud was not the largest party in the Knesset, resulting in the formation of a national unity coalition that at some point included Labor–Meimad (the largest faction in the Knesset), Shas, the Centre Party, the National Religious Party, United Torah Judaism, Yisrael BaAliyah, the National Union-Yisrael Beiteinu, the New Way and Gesher. Shas left the government on 23 May 2002, but returned on 3 June, whilst Labor–Meimad left on 2 November 2002.

The government initially had 26 ministers and 15 deputy ministers, making it the largest in Israeli political history, and resulting in a new $10,000 horseshoe-shaped table having to be installed in the Knesset plenum. There were four Deputy Prime Ministers and eight Ministers without Portfolio during the government's term, during which the total number of ministers rose to 29. Although there had previously been Israeli Arab deputy ministers, with the inclusion of the Druze politician Salah Tarif as Minister without Portfolio, the twenty-ninth government was the first to have a non-Jewish minister. Sharon formed a center-right coalition government that was not dependent on the ultra-Orthodox parties.

The government held office until Sharon formed the thirtieth government on 28 February 2003, following Likud's comprehensive victory in the January elections.

Israeli government formation, 2001
- 6 February 2001-7 March 2001
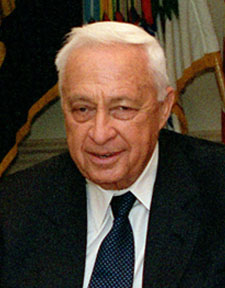

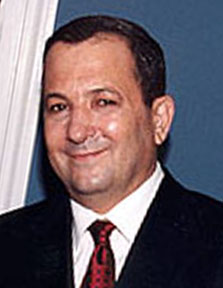
Candidate	Ariel Sharon	Ehud Barak
Party	Likud	Labor
Popular vote	1,698,077	1,023,944
Percentage	62.39%	37.61%
Investiture vote - In favor	72
Investiture vote - Against	21
Prime Minister before election
Ehud Barak
Labor
Elected Prime Minister
Ariel Sharon
Likud

== Cabinet members ==
Position	Person	Party
Prime Minister	Ariel Sharon	Likud
Deputy Prime Minister	Shimon Peres (until 2 November 2002)	Labor-Meimad
Deputy Prime Minister	Silvan Shalom	Likud
Deputy Prime Minister	Natan Sharansky	Yisrael BaAliyah
Deputy Prime Minister	Eli Yishai ^{1}	Shas
Minister of Agriculture	Shalom Simhon (until 2 November 2002)	Labor–Meimad
Minister of Agriculture	Tzipi Livni (from 17 December 2002)	Likud
Minister of Communications	Reuven Rivlin	Likud
Minister of Defense	Binyamin Ben-Eliezer (until 2 November 2002)	Labor–Meimad
Minister of Defense	Shaul Mofaz (from 4 November 2002)	Not an MK
Minister of Education	Limor Livnat	Likud
Minister of the Environment	Tzachi Hanegbi	Likud
Minister of Finance	Silvan Shalom	Likud
Minister of Foreign Affairs	Shimon Peres (until 2 November 2002)	Labor–Meimad
Minister of Foreign Affairs	Benjamin Netanyahu (from 6 November 2002)	Not an MK
Minister of Health	Nissim Dahan ^{1}	Shas
Minister of Housing and Construction	Natan Sharansky	Yisrael BaAliyah
Minister of Immigrant Absorption	Ariel Sharon	Likud
Minister of Industry, Trade and Labour	Dalia Itzik (until 2 November 2002)	Labor–Meimad
Minister of Industry, Trade and Labour	Ariel Sharon (from 2 November 2002)	Likud
Minister of Internal Affairs	Eli Yishai ^{1}	Shas
Minister of Internal Security	Uzi Landau	Likud
Minister of Jerusalem Affairs	Eli Suissa ^{1}	Shas
Minister of Justice	Meir Sheetrit	Likud
Minister of Labour and Social Welfare	Shlomo Benizri	Shas
Minister of National Infrastructure	Avigdor Lieberman (until 14 March 2002)	Yisrael Beiteinu
Minister of National Infrastructure	Effi Eitam (from 18 September 2002)	Not an MK
Minister of Regional Co-operation	Tzipi Livni (until 29 August 2001)	Likud
Minister of Regional Co-operation	Roni Milo (from 29 August 2001)	Centre Party
Minister of Religious Affairs	Asher Ohana	Not an MK
Minister of Science, Culture and Sport	Matan Vilnai	Not an MK
Minister of Social Co-ordination	Shmuel Avital	Not an MK
Minister of Tourism	Rehavam Ze'evi (until 17 October 2001) X	National Union
Minister of Tourism	Benny Elon (31 October 2001 - 14 March 2002)	National Union
Minister of Tourism	Yitzhak Levy (from 18 September 2002)	Not an MK
Minister of Transportation	Efraim Sneh (until 2 November 2002)	Labor–Meimad
Minister of Transportation	Tzachi Hanegbi (from 15 December 2002)	Likud
Minister without Portfolio	Ra'anan Cohen (until 18 August 2002)	Labor–Meimad
Minister without Portfolio	Effi Eitam (8 April - 18 September 2002)	Not an MK
Minister without Portfolio	David Levy (8 April - 30 July 2002)	Gesher
Minister without Portfolio	Yitzhak Levy (8 April - 18 September 2002)	Not an MK
Minister without Portfolio	Tzipi Livni (29 August 2001 - 17 December 2002)	Likud
Minister without Portfolio	Dan Meridor (from 29 August 2001)	Centre Party
Minister without Portfolio	Dan Naveh	Likud
Minister without Portfolio	Salah Tarif (until 29 January 2002)	Labor–Meimad
Deputy Minister in the Prime Minister's Office	Yuri Stern (until 14 March 2002)	Yisrael Beiteinu
Deputy Minister of Defense	Dalia Rabin-Pelossof (until 1 August 2002)	New Way
Deputy Minister of Defense	Weizman Shiry (12 August - 2 November 2002)	Labor–Meimad
Deputy Minister of Education	Meshulam Nahari ^{1}	Shas
Deputy Minister of Education	Avraham Ravitz (from 16 April 2001)	United Torah Judaism
Deputy Minister of Finance	Yitzhak Cohen (from 2 May 2001)^{1}	Shas
Deputy Minister of Foreign Affairs	Michael Melchior (until 2 November 2002)	Labor–Meimad
Deputy Minister of Housing and Construction	Meir Porush (from 4 June 2001)	United Torah Judaism
Deputy Minister of Immigrant Absorption	Yuli-Yoel Edelstein	Yisrael BaAliyah
Deputy Minister of Industry and Trade	Eli Ben-Menachem (until 2 November 2002)	Labor–Meimad
Deputy Minister of Internal Affairs	David Azulai (from 2 March 2001)^{1}	Shas
Deputy Minister of Internal Security	Gideon Ezra	Likud
Deputy Minister of Labour and Social Welfare	Yitzhak Vaknin (from 2 May 2001)^{1}	Shas
Deputy Minister of National Infrastructure	Naomi Blumenthal (until 1 January 2003)	Likud
Deputy Minister of Transportation	Avraham Yehezkel (until 2 November 2002)	Labor–Meimad
Deputy Minister of Transportation	Sofa Landver (12 August - 2 November 2002)	Labor–Meimad

^{1} The Shas ministers resigned between 20 and 23 May 2002, but returned to office on 3 June. With the exception of the Jerusalem Affairs portfolio, during their absence, Ariel Sharon took over their positions.
