= Ze'ev Tzur =

Israeli politician (1911–1994)

Faction represented in the Knesset
- 1955–1959: Ahdut HaAvoda
- 1965–1968: Alignment
- 1968–1969: Labor Party
- 1969: Alignment

Personal details
- Born: 11 September 1911 Krynki, Russian Empire
- Died: 28 September 1994 (aged 83)

Ze'ev Tzur (Hebrew: זאב צור; 11 September 1911 – 28 September 1994) was an Israeli politician who served as a member of the Knesset between 1955 and 1959, and again from 1965 until 1969.

== Biography ==
Born Ze'ev Stein on 11 September 1911 in Krynki, Russian Empire (now in Poland), Tzur studied at a Hebrew gymnasium in Hrodna, before attending a polytechnic in Vilnius, and was a member of the youth movement of the Polish Social Zionists and Dror. In 1931 he emigrated to Mandatory Palestine. Between 1933 and 1934 he was a member of the Rishon LeZion Workers Council, and in 1944 became a member of HaMerkaz HaHakla'i.

A member of the B faction of Mapai, in 1944 he became one of the leaders of the breakaway Ahdut HaAvoda-Poale Zion faction. He was elected to the Knesset on the Ahdut HaAvoda list in 1955, and on 5 December that year was appointed Deputy Minister of Agriculture.

He lost his seat in the 1959 elections, but in 1961 became the party's political secretary. The following year he became a member of the editorial board of LaMerhav, the party's newspaper, on which he sat until 1969. He returned to the Knesset on the Alignment list (an alliance of Ahdut HaAvoda and Mapai) in 1965, and in 1968 became a member of the central committee of the newly formed Labor Party. He lost his seat again in the 1969 elections, and later served as a director of the Tabenkin Centre.

He died in 1994 at the age of 83.
