= Pinchas Sapir =

Israeli politician (1906–1975)

- פנחס ספיר
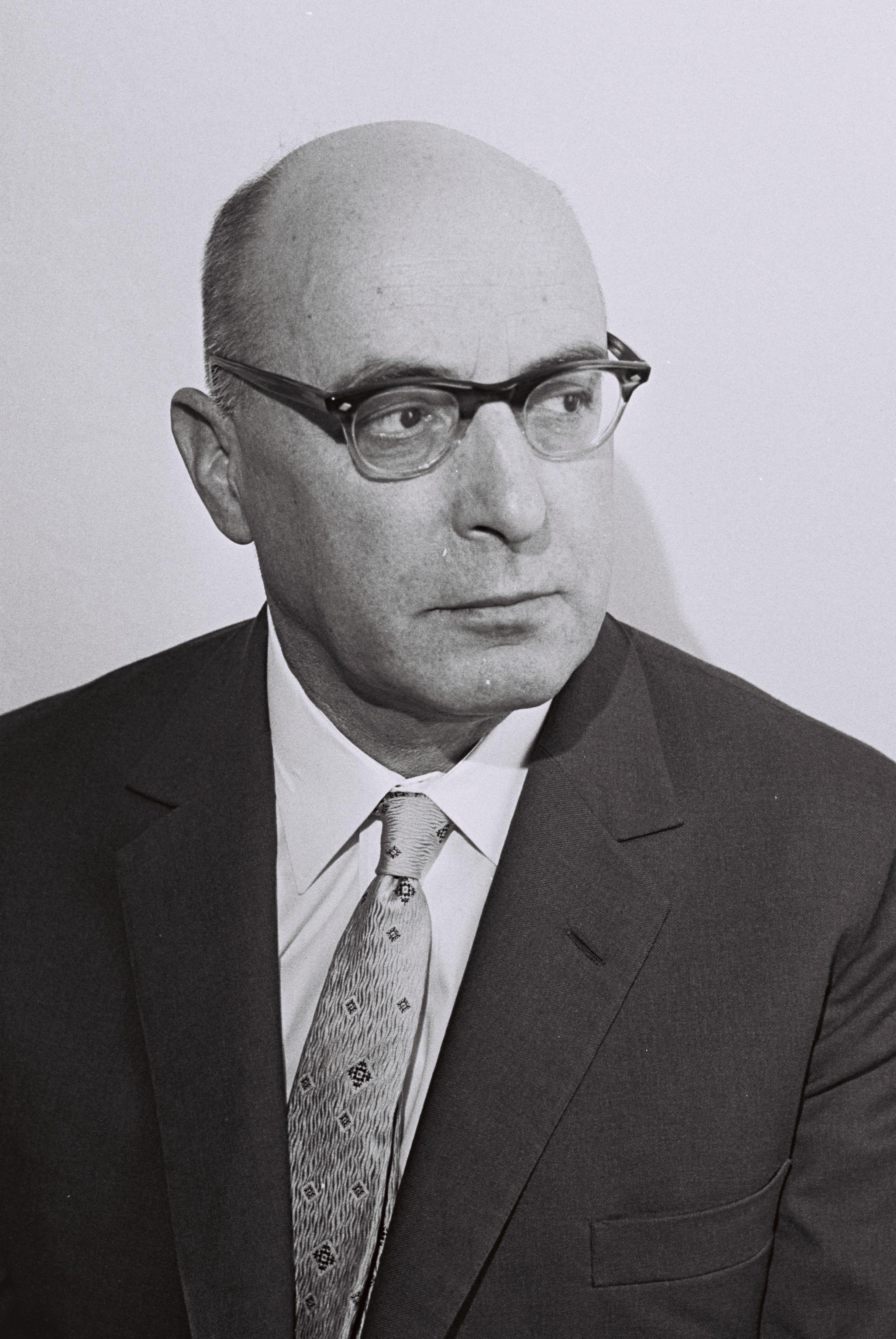

Ministerial roles
- 1955–1965: Minister of Trade and Industry
- 1963–1968: Minister of Finance
- 1968–1969: Minister without Portfolio
- 1969–1974: Minister of Finance
- 1970–1972: Minister of Trade and Industry

Faction represented in the Knesset
- 1959–1965: Mapai
- 1965–1968: Alignment
- 1968–1969: Labor Party
- 1969–1975: Alignment

Personal details
- Born: 15 October 1906 Suwałki, Russian Empire
- Died: 12 August 1975 (aged 68) Nevatim, Israel

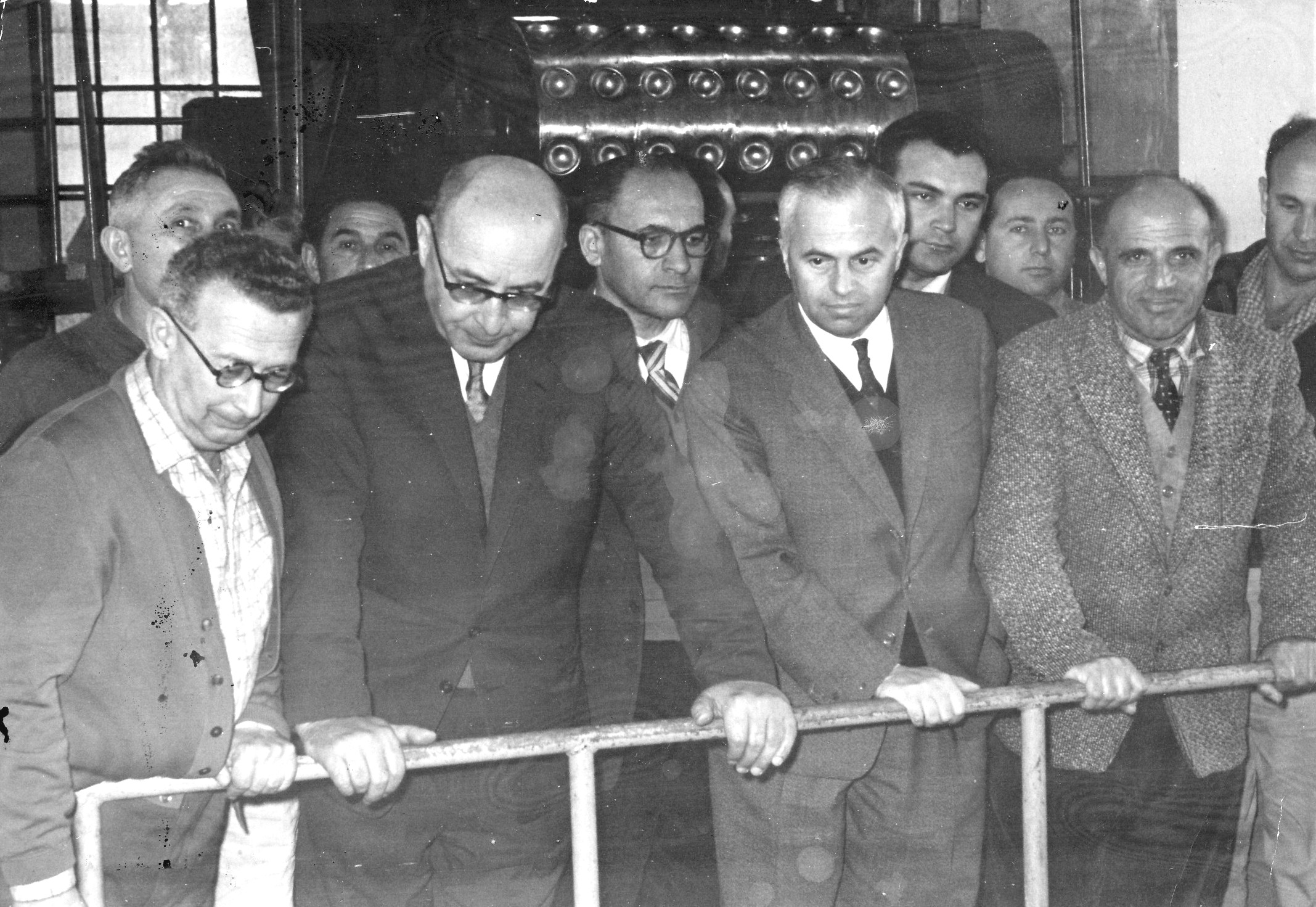
Minister Sapir visiting a factory at Kibbutz Gan Shmuel (1962)

Pinchas Sapir (Hebrew: פנחס ספיר; born Pinchas Kozlowski 15 October 1906 – 12 August 1975) was an Israeli politician during the first three decades following the country's founding.

He held two important ministerial posts, Minister of Finance (1963–68 and 1969–74) and Minister of Trade and Industry (1955–65 and 1970–72) as well as several other high-ranking governmental posts. For many years, he served as the Secretary General of Mapai or the Labor Party. He is often considered to be 'the father' of the Israeli economy for his efforts to foster economic development during the country's formative years.

== Biography ==
Pinchas Sapir was born in 1906 in Suwałki, Russian Empire (now in Poland) and after graduating from a teachers' seminary he emigrated to Mandatory Palestine in 1929. He was a long-time resident of the city of Kfar Saba where he lived in a modest apartment until his death. He died from a heart attack while attending a ceremony in moshav Nevatim, on 12 August 1975.

== Political career ==
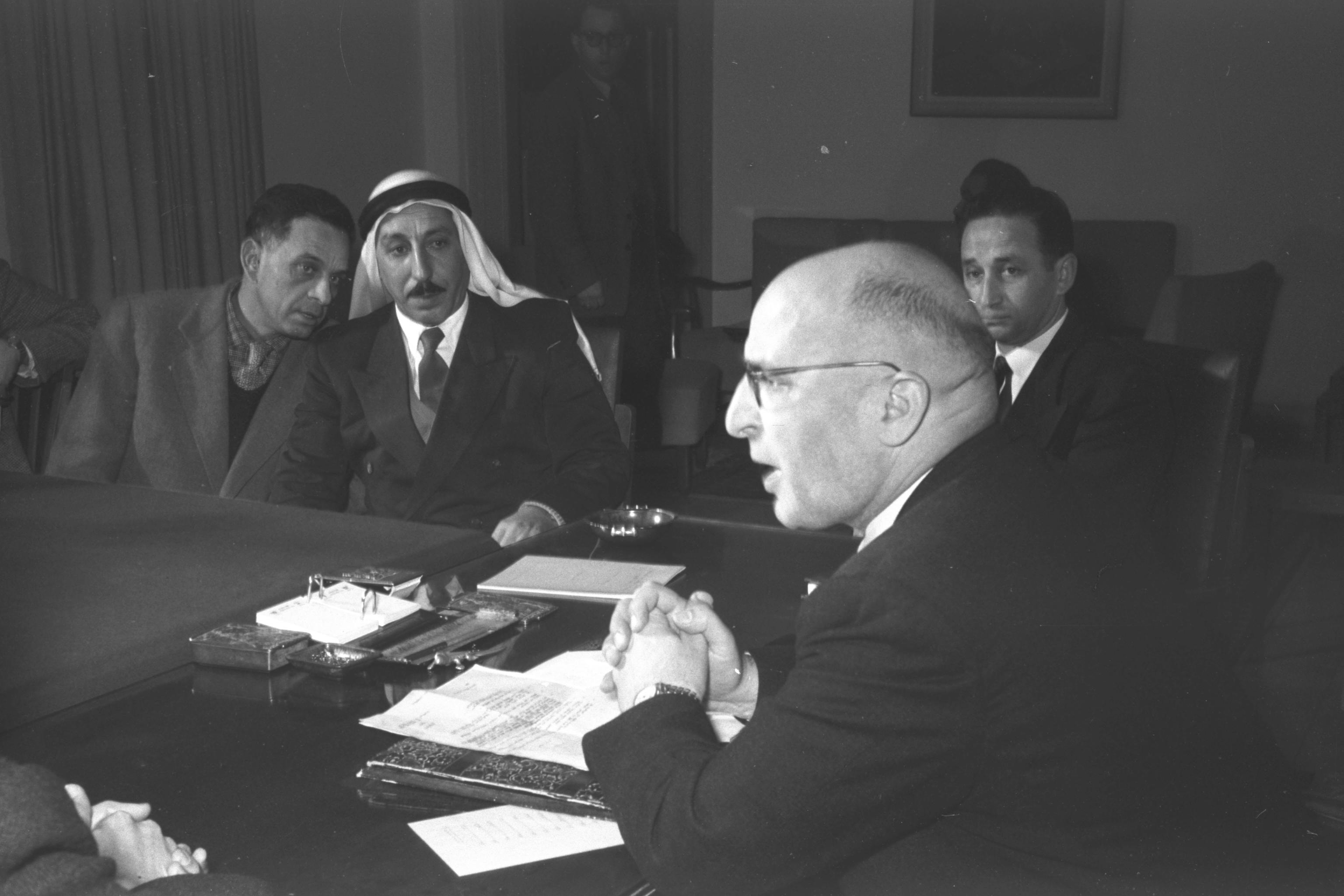
Pinhas Sapir with Arab MKs

At the time he served in government, the young state was isolated economically from its neighbors while having to contend with significant defense expenditures and struggling to absorb and provide for the many Jewish immigrants who entered its borders. Sapir worked tirelessly to attract foreign investments to the country, often by personally encouraging and enticing businessmen from around the world to set up factories and businesses in the young nation. He is known for always carrying with him his famous "black notebook" in which he kept his notes and observations pertaining to economic matters as he traveled around the country. It was often said that in those days that the entire economy of the state of Israel was managed from that famous black notebook.

While he is at times criticized for perhaps providing undue protection to wealthy investors and practicing too much centralized control (as in the "black notebook"), he is nevertheless recognized as a man of action who always had the best interests of the Israeli economy and society on his mind. During his tenure the country experienced very high economic growth rates, sometimes exceeding 10% annually despite the many challenges it faced from both outside and within. For this he is often considered one of the best finance ministers in the state's history.

== Commemoration ==
The Sapir Pumping Station of the National Water Carrier of Israel is named after Pinhas Sapir.

Named in Sapir's honour is also Moshav Sapir, founded in 1978, as is Sapir College in southern Israel and the prestigious Sapir Prize in literature, as well as various streets and other landmarks throughout Israel.

In October 2012 the Ramat Gan Safari zoo named a newborn Brazilian Tapir in Sapir's honor. Following the collection of possible names that start with the letter P (as it is the zoo's practice to name all individuals of the same family with names starting with the same letter), suggested by the general public, the young tapir was named Pinchas Tapir.
