= Labor Minister of Israel =

Ministry of Labor
- משרד העבודה; Sar HaAvoda
- Emblem of Israel

Agency overview
- Formed: 1948
- Dissolved: 1977
- Jurisdiction: Government of Israel

The Minister of Labor (Hebrew: שר העבודה, Sar HaAvoda) was the political head of the Israeli Ministry of Labor and a position in the cabinet.

== History ==
The post was established in 1948 as the Minister of Labour and Construction, becoming the Minister of Labour and Social Security the following year.

In 1977 the post was merged with the Welfare Minister, becoming the Minister of Labor and Social Welfare. In 2003 the labor function was transferred to the Minister of Industry and Trade, which was renamed Industry, Trade and Labor Minister.

== List ministers ==
#	Minister	Party	Government	Term start	Term end
Minister Labor and Construction
1	Mordechai Bentov	Mapam	P	14 May 1948	10 March 1949
Minister of Labor and Social Security
2	Golda Meir	Mapai	1, 2	10 March 1949	8 October 1951
Minister of Labor
–	Golda Meir	Mapai	3, 4, 5, 6, 7	8 October 1951	19 June 1956
3	Mordechai Namir	Mapai	7, 8	19 June 1956	17 December 1959
4	Giora Yoseftal	Mapai	9	17 December 1959	2 November 1961
5	Yigal Allon	Mapai; Alignment; Labor Party	10, 11, 12, 13	2 November 1961	1 July 1968
6	Yosef Almogi	Labor Party; Alignment	13, 14, 15	8 July 1968	10 March 1974
7	Yitzhak Rabin	Alignment	16	10 March 1974	3 June 1974
8	Moshe Baram	Alignment	17	3 June 1974	20 June 1977
