= Ministry of Economy (Israel) =

Government ministry of Israel

- משרד הכלכלה; Misrad HaKalkala
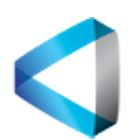

Agency overview
- Formed: 1949
- Jurisdiction: Government of Israel
- Minister responsible: Nir Barkat
- Deputy Minister responsible: Almog Cohen
- Agency executive: Muti Gamish, General Director
- Website: www.economy.gov.il

The Ministry of Economy (Hebrew: משרד הכלכלה, romanized: Misrad HaKalkala) is a ministry of the Israeli government that oversees commerce, industry and labor in Israel.

== History ==
The ministry was established in 1948 as the Ministry of Commerce and Industry. In 1977 the Tourism Ministry post was added to it, becoming the Ministry of Industry, Trade, and Tourism. However, the merger was reversed in 1981 and the office was renamed Ministry of Industry and Trade. Labor, which had been merged with the Welfare Ministry in the 1970s, was appended to the portfolio in 2003.

== List of ministers ==
#	Minister	Party	Government	Term start	Term end	Notes
Minister of Trade and Industry
1	Peretz Bernstein	General Zionists	P	14 May 1948	10 March 1949	
2	Eliezer Kaplan	Mapai	1	10 March 1949	1 November 1950	
3	Ya'akov Geri	Not an MK	2	1 November 1950	8 October 1951	
4	Dov Yosef	Mapai	3	8 October 1951	24 December 1952	
–	Peretz Bernstein	General Zionists	4, 5	24 December 1952	29 June 1955	
5	Peretz Naftali	Mapai	6	29 June 1955	3 November 1955	
6	Pinchas Sapir	Mapai	7, 8, 9, 10, 11, 12	3 November 1955	25 May 1965	
7	Haim Yosef Zadok	Mapai, Alignment	12, 13	25 May 1965	22 November 1966	
8	Ze'ev Sherf	Alignment	13, 14	22 November 1966	15 December 1969	
9	Yosef Sapir	Gahal	15	15 December 1969	6 August 1970	
–	Pinchas Sapir	Alignment	15	1 September 1970	5 March 1972	
10	Haim Bar-Lev	Not an MK	15, 16, 17	5 March 1972	20 June 1977	Not an MK at the time of his appointment, but later elected to the Knesset on the Alignment list
Minister of Industry, Trade and Tourism
11	Yigal Hurvitz	Likud	18	20 June 1977	1 October 1978	
12	Gideon Patt	Likud	18	15 January 1979	5 August 1981	
Minister of Industry and Trade
–	Gideon Patt	Likud	19, 20	5 August 1981	13 September 1984	
13	Ariel Sharon	Likud	21, 22, 23	13 September 1984	20 February 1990	
14	Moshe Nissim	Likud	23, 24	7 March 1990	13 July 1992	
15	Michael Harish	Labor Party	25, 26	13 July 1992	18 June 1996	
16	Natan Sharansky	Yisrael BaAliyah	27	18 June 1996	6 July 1999	
17	Ran Cohen	Meretz	28	6 July 1999	24 June 2000	
18	Ehud Barak	One Israel	28	24 September 2000	7 March 2001	
19	Dalia Itzik	Labor Party	29	7 March 2001	2 November 2002	
–	Ariel Sharon	Likud	29	2 November 2002	28 February 2003	
Minister of Industry, Trade and Labor
20	Ehud Olmert	Likud, Kadima	30	28 February 2003	4 May 2006	
21	Eli Yishai	Shas	31	4 May 2006	31 March 2009	
22	Binyamin Ben-Eliezer	Labor Party	32	31 March 2009	17 January 2011	
23	Shalom Simhon	Independence	32	18 January 2011	22 January 2013	
Minister of the Economy
24	Naftali Bennett	The Jewish Home	33	23 January 2013	14 May 2015	
25	Aryeh Deri	Shas	34	14 May 2015	3 November 2015	
26	Benjamin Netanyahu	Likud	34	3 November 2015	1 August 2016	
27	Moshe Kahlon	Kulanu	34	1 August 2016	23 January 2017	
28	Eli Cohen	Kulanu	34	23 January 2017	17 May 2020	
29	Amir Peretz	Labor Party	35	17 May 2020	13 June 2021	
30	Orna Barbivai	Yesh Atid	36	13 June 2021	29 December 2022	
31	Nir Barkat	Likud	37	29 December 2022		

=== Deputy ministers ===
#	Minister	Party	Government	Term start	Term end
1	Zalman Suzayiv	General Zionists	4, 5	15 June 1953	29 June 1955
2	Aryeh Eliav	Alignment	13	17 October 1966	22 November 1966
–	Aryeh Eliav	Alignment	13	28 November 1966	26 June 1967
3	Yitzhak Peretz	Likud	18	28 June 1977	15 January 1979
4	Masha Lubelsky	Labor Party	25, 26	4 August 1992	18 June 1996
5	Eli Ben-Menachem	Labor Party	29	7 March 2001	2 November 2002
6	Michael Ratzon	Likud	30	5 March 2003	28 October 2004
7	Eli Aflalo	Kadima	30	30 March 2005	4 May 2006
8	Orit Noked	Labor Party	32	31 March 2009	18 January 2011
9	Yair Golan	Meretz	36	13 June 2021	29 December 2022
