= 1993 Likud leadership election =

- March 24, 1993
- Turnout: 67.1%

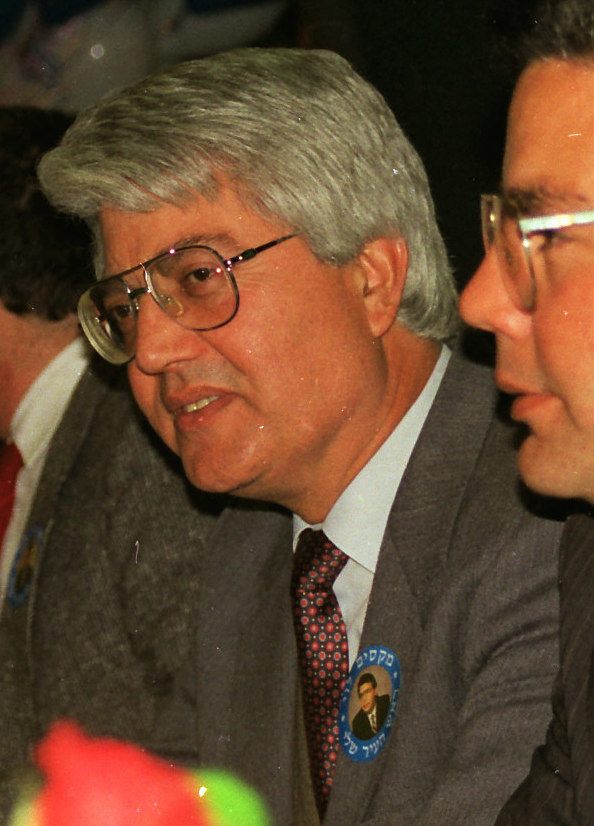

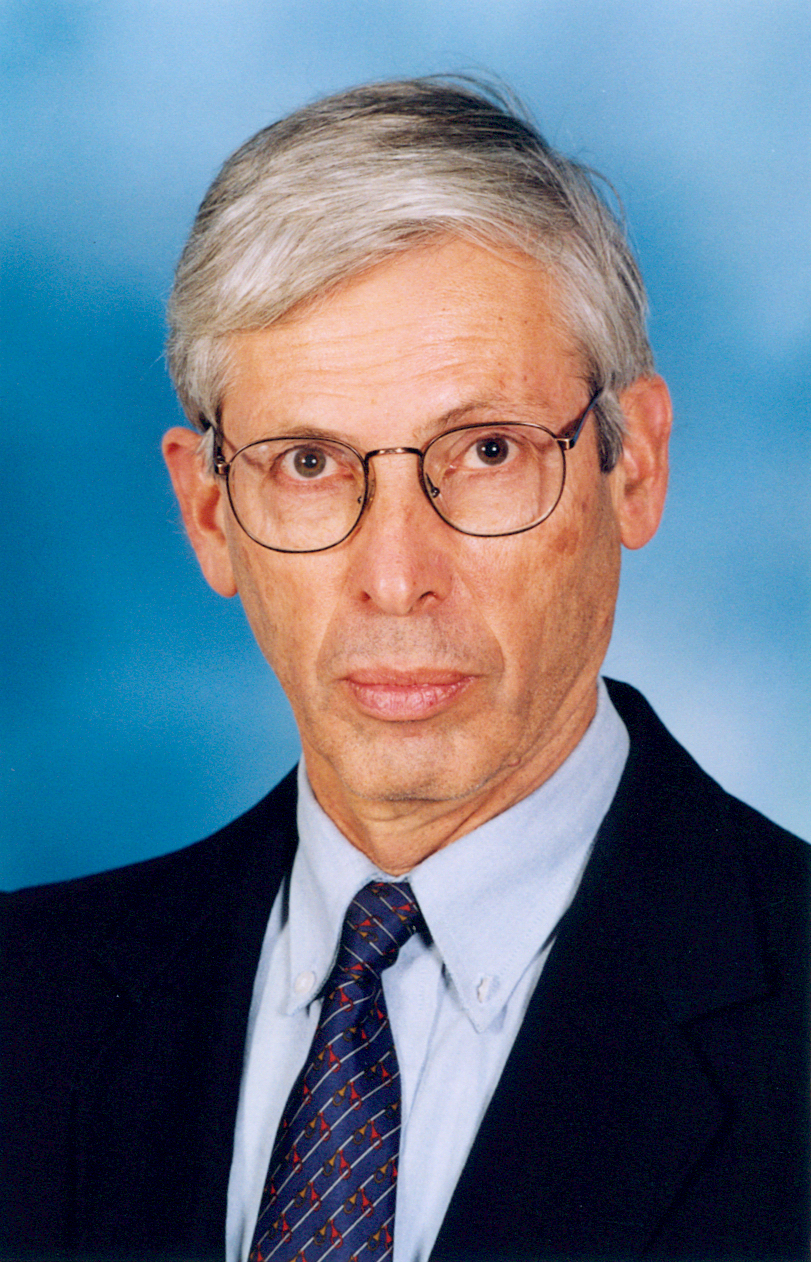

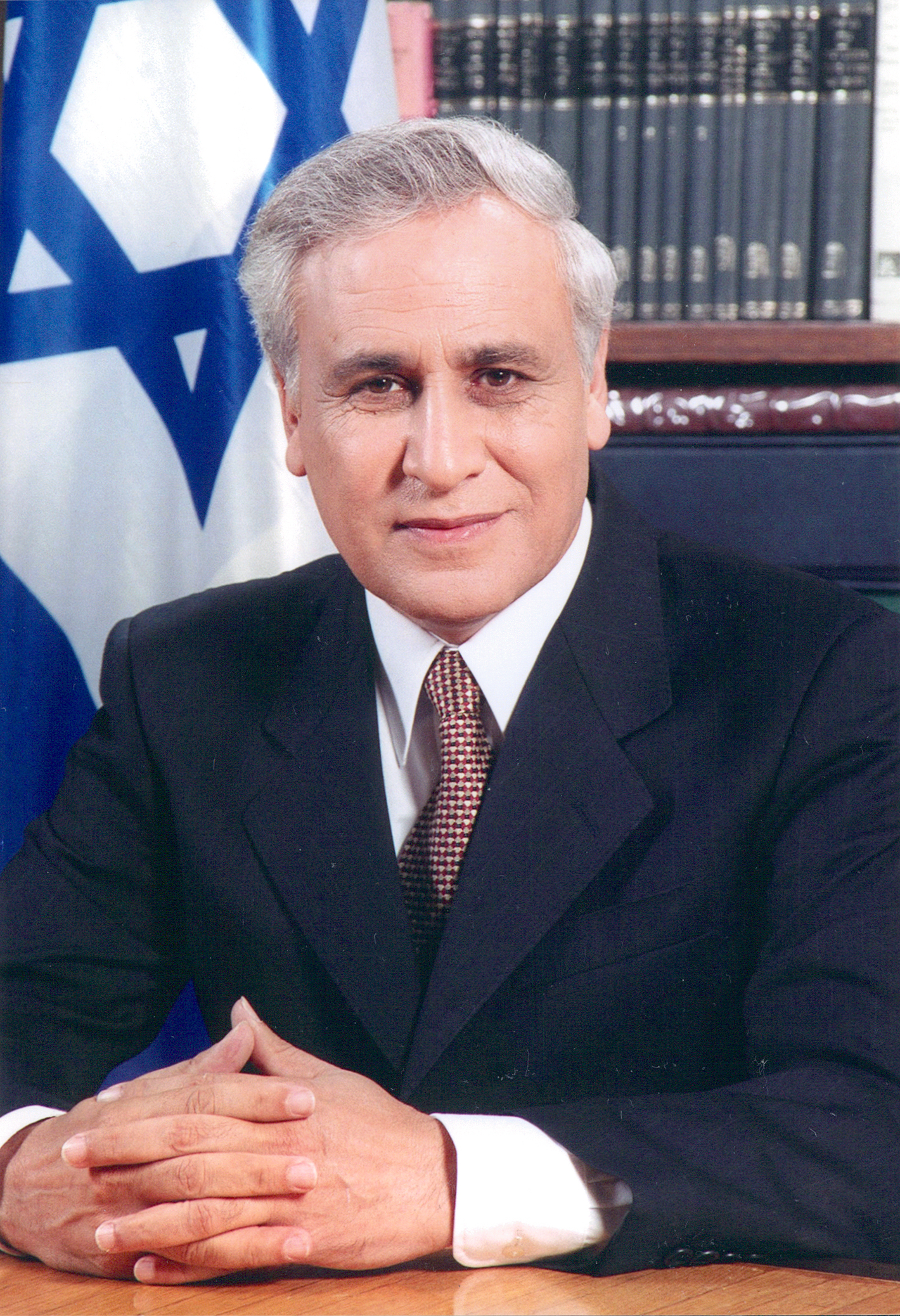
| Candidate | Benjamin Netanyahu | David Levy |
| Party | Likud | Likud |
| Popular vote | 72,705 | 36,654 |
| Percentage | 52.1% | 26.3% |
| Candidate | Benny Begin | Moshe Katsav |
| Party | Likud | Likud |
| Popular vote | 21,052 | 9,111 |
| Percentage | 15.1% | 6.5% |
Leader before election
Yitzhak Shamir
Elected Leader
Benjamin Netanyahu

The 1993 Likud leadership election was held on March 24, 1993, to elect the leader of the Likud party. Benjamin Netanyahu defeated three other candidates in the race to succeed outgoing party leader Yitzhak Shamir. This was the first time in the history of the Likud party (or its predecessor Herut) that voting in a party leadership election was open to the party's general membership. Since Netanyahu received more than the 40% threshold required to win in the first round of voting, no runoff election was held.

== Background ==
After Likud was defeated in the 1992 Israeli legislative election, incumbent party leader Yitzhak Shamir announced that he would resign as party leader.

In the period since its defeat in the 1992 Israeli legislative election, Likud's party organization was in turmoil. The party had incurred sizeable debt. It also had seen the Supreme Court of Israel rule the party's constitution invalid.

== Candidates ==
Ran

- Benny Begin, member of the Knesset since 1988, and former head of environmental affairs at the Israeli Geology Survey
- Benjamin Netanyahu, member of the Knesset since 1988, former permanent representative of Israel to the United Nations (1984–1988), former deputy foreign minister
- Moshe Katsav, member of the Knesset since 1977, chairman of the Likud Knesset caucus, former minister of transportation (1988–1992), former minister of labor and social welfare (1984–1988), former mayor of Kiryat Malakhi
- David Levy, member of the Knesset since 1969, former minister of foreign affairs (1990–1992), former deputy prime minister (1981–92), former minister of housing and construction (1979–1990), former minister of immigrant absorption (1977–1981), former deputy minister of housing and construction, candidate in the 1983 Herut and 1992 Likud leadership elections

Declined to run

- Ariel Sharon, member of the Knesset (in 1973; and again since 1977) former minister of defense (1981–1983); former minister of housing and construction (1990–1992); former minister of industry, trade, and labour (1984–1990); former minister of agriculture (1977–1981); former minister without portfolio (1983–84); candidate in the 1984 Herut and 1992 Likud leadership elections

=== Overview of candidates ===
The election was seen as being part of a generational change in both the party's leadership and in Israeli politics. In terms of age, Netanyahu was 44, Begin was 50, Katsav was 48, and Levy was 56.

The candidates came from different backgrounds. Netanyahu's career had been as a diplomat and politician. He was born in Tel Aviv, Israel, but had spent a portion of his youth in the United States, where he was also raised for part of his youth, and had overall lived for fifteen years of his life in the United States. Netanyahu was seen as both having a knack for promoting himself through publicity, and was regarded to practice "American-style politics". His public stature had been previously elevated during the Gulf War, during which he served as a spokesman on behalf of the Israeli government. He had received a master's degree in management from the Massachusetts Institute of Technology in the United States.

Begin was born in Jerusalem, Israel. He was the son of the late former Israeli prime minister Menachem Begin. Outside of his political career, he had been a geologist by profession. He had received a PhD from Colorado State University in the United States.

Katsav was born in Iran, but immigrated to Israel with his parents at the age of 5. He had received a bachelor of arts from Hebrew University. Outside of politics, he had been a businessman.

Levy had been born in Morocco, and had immigrated to Israel at the age of 20. He had the longest Knesset tenure of any of the candidates running. Levy's career had seen him work as both a politician and a trade union leader. Levy had a "rags to riches" personal backstory, rising form poverty to a position of great political influence.

== Election procedure ==
This was the first time in the history of the Likud party (or its predecessor Herut) that a party leadership election was open to the party's general membership. At the time, the general membership numbered around 216,000. For a candidate to win outright in the first round, they needed to receive more than 40% of the vote, otherwise a runoff election would have been held.

== Campaigning ==
The campaign went very negative, particularly between Netanyahu and Levy. Levy and Netanyahu were longtime political rivals with a bitter political feud. During the campaign, Levy referred to Netanyahu in such terms as "liar" and "eel", and pejoratively compared Netanyahu to Napoleon Boneparte.

=== Bibigate controversy ===
Netanyahu faced allegations of adultery, revelations which Netanyahu ultimately admitted in a mid-January national television appearance during the campaign were true. In the interview, Netanyahu admitted that his affair had only ended months prior, but did not specify with whom he had had an affair. Many in the media likened the scandal to United States President Bill Clinton's scandal related to allegations amid his 1992 United States presidential election campaign of a past extramarital affair with Gennifer Flowers. The scandal around Netanyahu's extramarital affair was dubbed "Bibigate", a portmanteau of Netanyahu's nickname "Bibi" and the suffix "gate" often used for scandals and controversies that have occurred in the years since the Watergate scandal.

After admitting his affair, Netanyahu alleged that "someone very high up" in Likud that "surrounds himself with criminals" attempted to blackmail him into withdrawing from the race by threatening to release videotape of him in compromising extramarital romantic situations. The news media largely inferred that Netanyahu was likely implying that Levy had been the one who attempted to blackmail him. Levy strongly denied having done this. The greatest surprise among the public was not that Netanyahu had had an affair, but rather that Netanyahu had chosen to admit to the affair, and that he had made a serious claim that (presumably Levy) had allegedly attempted to blackmail him about it.

Polls suggested that Netanyahu likely lost a portion of his support among women and devoutly religious Israelis by admitting to his affair, but that his confession may have actually boosted his reputation with the overall public.

While police launched an investigation into Netanyahu's allegations that he had been subjected to a blackmail attempt, the results of this investigation were not yet announced at the time of the leadership election. It was reported on Israel Radio that unnamed political sources had alleged that the outgoing national police chief, Yaacov Temer, had ordered a deliberate delay of any results being announced until after the leadership election. Levy would also allege that this was the case.

=== Benjamin Netanyahu's campaign ===
During the campaign, Netanyahu was regarded as the overwhelming front-runner. Opinion polls predicted Netanyahu would receive enough support to forgo a runoff election, with some polls even showing him as garnering as much as 60% of the likely vote.

Netanyahu's campaign style was often described as "American-style". Many critical of Netanyahu derided this "American-style" approach to politics, loathing the "Americanization" of Israeli politics. They belittled the manner in which Netanyahu often provided quick summaries of his positions, characterizing his comments as aimed at serving as "sound bites" for television as opposed to more serious explanations of policy stances.

Netanyahu benefited from a sizable amount of campaign contributions from right-wing American Jews and evangelical Christians. Critics of Netanyahu attacked the fact that he fundraised for his campaign in the United States, accusing him of being beholden to those contributors.

In terms of his public image and appeal, Netanyahu benefited from his claim to being a sabra. (native-born Israeli), and his distinguished military background.

Netanyahu confidently touted as the sole individual capable of returning Likud to leading the government, and painted the incumbent Israeli Labor Party-led government as disastrous for the country. He argued that leadership was the central issue of the race, particularly pointing to the change to Israeli elections that meant that the next prime minister would be selected by a direct popular vote. Netanyahu pledged to lead a two to three-year effort to rebuild the organization of the Likud party ahead of the next Knesset election. He also floated the potential of persuading a junior party in the incumbent government coalition to break from the government to force an early election. He noted that the coalition had a potential weekness in the fact that it relied on support of both the religious Shas party and the secular left-wing Meretz party. Comfortably leading in the polls, and centering his campaign on characterizing the strength of his own leadership, Netanyahu largely focused his criticisms on incumbent Labor Party prime minister Yitzhak Rabin, as opposed to spending time criticizing his election opponents. While his campaign was focused on his leadership, Netanyahu did not provide many details of specifics political actions or policies he would pursue. Netanyahu's lack of policy specifics attracted criticism from opponents. Opponent Benny Begin remarked, "a leadership devoid of content will not succeed." Netanyahu particularly avoided discussing domestic issues, and was even quoted by The Sydney Morning Herald as declaring at a rally,

"I won't talk about social issues, that's not what I'm here for. I'm not interested in talking about the country we are going to have. I'm not talking about the economy, unemployment, or redundancies. There's no time. I'm talking about whether we'll have a country."

In a Los Angeles Times report on the election, Michael Parks described Netanyahu as "almost distainful of domestic social and economic policy issues. Parks further observed,

What has left many Likud supporters uneasy is that Netanyahu's political philosophy appears focused simply on power, getting it and keeping it, and that his strategy for the party's comeback is summed up as "my leadership". For a party that grew out of the ideologically driven Zionist nationalism espoused for decades by Menachem Begin, this seems a virtual abandonment of principle in favor of the rankest form of politics.

While Netanyahu generally avoided providing specific policies on most issues, he still staked out general positions on a few matters. Netanyahu deliberately made an effort to project a tough-guy image, which was reflected in the positions chose to highlight, emphasizing "tough" potions on national security concerns, and positioning himself as a hawk. A key political issue that Netanyahu made central to his campaign was the Golan Heights. Netanyahu accused Prime Minister Yitzhak Rabin of planning a secret plan to retreat from this territory (which Israel had captured from Syria during the Six Day War in 1967) as part of an Israeli-Syrian peace agreement. Netanyahu promised that, if he became prime minister, he would stake out a more hardline position than Rabin in any prospective peace talks. The Sydney Morning Herald quoted Netanyahu as having, on the campaign trail, provided a personal analysis of the Zionist movement that split it into two camps. The first camp, he claimed, were those that he said included Likud, who "fought Arab terror". The second, he said, were those that included the left-wing Meretz party (a partner in the current Israeli government coalition), who he calaimed "appeased" such terror.

=== David Levy's campaign ===
This was not Levy's first time running for leadership of Likud or its predecessor party Herut. Levy had run for Herut leadership in 1983 and leadership of Likud in 1992.

Levy benefited from a strong base among the Likud party's rank and file.

Levy floated the possibility that he might either break away from the party or petition the party's internal court to expel Netanyahu from the party. The heated division between Netanyahu and David was seen as threatening a fracture in the party, raising concerns for many that it could lead to disunity that would impair the party in the next elections, and that Netanyahu might not be capable of repairing such a divide.

=== Benny Begin's campaign ===
Due to the celebrated legacy of his father, as well as indications that Yithak Shamir might have supported his candidacy, Begin was at one time seen as a likely contender to succeed Shamir. However, Carol Rosenberg of the Miami Herald wrote that his "awkward" performance during the 1992 legislative elections had hurt his chances, with Rosenberg writing that in 1992, Begin had, "appeared uncomfortable with the mudslinging personality-oriented tone of the campaign, a departure in Israel's party-oriented politics."

== Result ==
1993 Likud leadership election
| Party | Candidate | Votes | % |
|---|---|---|---|
| Likud | Benjamin Netanyahu | 72,705 | 52.1 |
| Likud | David Levy | 36,654 | 26.3 |
| Likud | Benny Begin | 21,052 | 15.1 |
| Likud | Moshe Katsav | 9,111 | 6.5 |
| Turnout | | | 67.1 |

== Aftermath ==
The election, incidentally, coincided with the Knesset (Israel's parliament) voting on the country's new president the same day. Netanyahu's election as leader of the nation's main opposition party and Ezer Weizman election as president meant that, for the first time in its history, the nation's (de facto) leader of the opposition, prime minister (Rabin), and president were all sabra.

Netanyahu would go on to narrowly win the direct election for prime minister 1996 Israeli general election. While he would lose the premiership in the 1999 Israeli general election, and would resign as Likud leader shortly thereafter, he would become party leader once again in the 2005 Likud leadership election, and would become prime minister again after the 2009 Israeli legislative election serving until 2021, and again from 2022 onwards.
