= Maxim Levy =

Israeli politician

- מקסים לוי
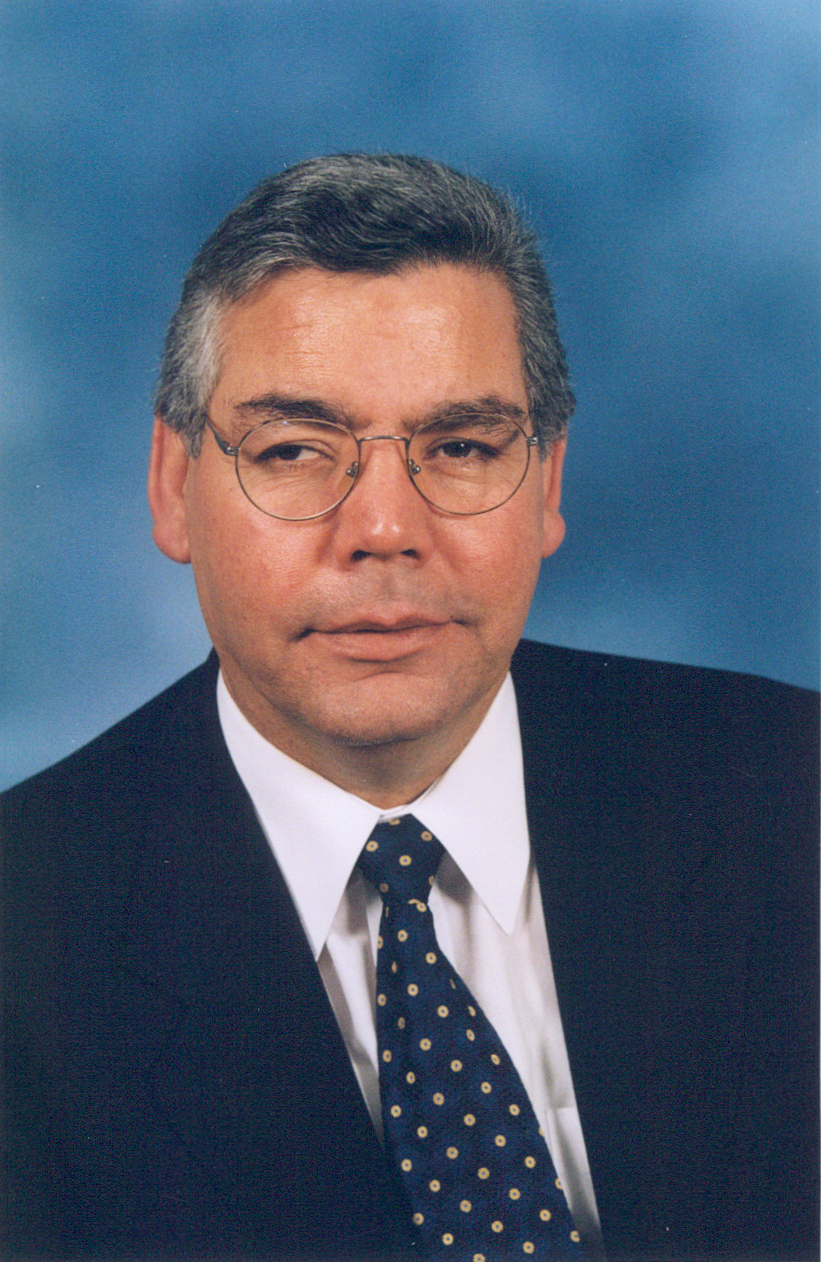

Faction represented in the Knesset
- 1996–1999: Gesher
- 1999–2001: One Israel
- 2001–2002: Gesher

Personal details
- Born: 11 February 1950 Rabat, Morocco
- Died: 11 October 2002 (aged 52)

Maxim Levy (Hebrew: מקסים לוי; 11 February 1950 – 11 October 2002) was an Israeli politician who served as a member of the Knesset for Gesher and One Israel between 1996 and 2002, as well as mayor of Lod between 1983 and 1996.

== Biography ==
Born in Rabat in Morocco, Levy emigrated to Israel in 1957 and worked as an aeroplane technician.

In 1973 he became a member of Herut's central bureau, and between 1978 and 1983 he chaired the National Workers Council of the Air Industry Workers in Israel. In 1982 he became Deputy Mayor of Lod, and the following year became mayor, serving until 1996. In the mid-1990s Levy joined Gesher, a new party established by his brother, David. Maxim was first elected to the Knesset on the Likud-Tzomet-Gesher list in 1996. During his first term, he chaired the Labour and Welfare Committee.

Prior to the 1999 elections, Gesher joined the One Israel alliance together with the Labor Party and Meimad. Levy was placed 18th on the alliance's list, and retained his seat as One Israel won 26 seats. He was also appointed Deputy Speaker of the Knesset.

On 7 March 2001 Levy, David Levy and Mordechai Mishani broke away from One Israel to re-establish Gesher as an independent faction. Levy resigned his seat on 5 June 2002, and was replaced by Meimad's Yehuda Gilad (as the One Israel list priority still applied to replacements). He died four months later.

Following his death, the resurrected Hapoel Lod football club was renamed "Hapoel Maxim Lod" in his honour.
