= Eli Goldschmidt =

Israeli politician

- Official portrait, 2026

Faction represented in the Knesset
- 1992–1999: Labor Party
- 1999–2001: One Israel
- 2026–: Likud

Personal details
- Born: 17 October 1953 (age 73) Tel Aviv, Israel

Eli Goldschmidt (Hebrew: אלי גולדשמידט; born 17 October 1953) is an Israeli politician and member of the Knesset for Likud. Goldschmidt previously served as a member of the Knesset for One Israel and the Labor Party between 1992 and 2001.

== Biography ==
Born in Tel Aviv, Goldschmidt studied law at Tel Aviv University, where he earned an MA before working as a lawyer.

He was first elected to the Knesset on the Labor Party list in 1992 and chaired the House Committee and the Joint Committee for the Knesset Budget during his first term. After being re-elected in 1996 he chaired the Economic Affairs Committee. For the 1999 elections he was placed thirteenth on the One Israel list (an alliance of Labor, Meimad and Gesher), and retained his seat as the alliance won 26 mandates. He was appointed chairman of the Finance Committee, but resigned his seat on 13 February 2001, citing a toxic political culture, and was replaced by Mordechai Mishani.

In July 2026, Goldschmidt and Danny Van Biran announced their intention to form a new political party, "Israel Awakens", to represent former left-wingers who moved right in the aftermath of the October 7 attacks. Later that year, Goldschmidt joined Likud and was given the 26th slot on the party list ahead of the 2026 Israeli legislative election. He was elected as the party won 27 seats.
