= 1992 Likud leadership election =

- 20 February 1992
- Turnout: 88%
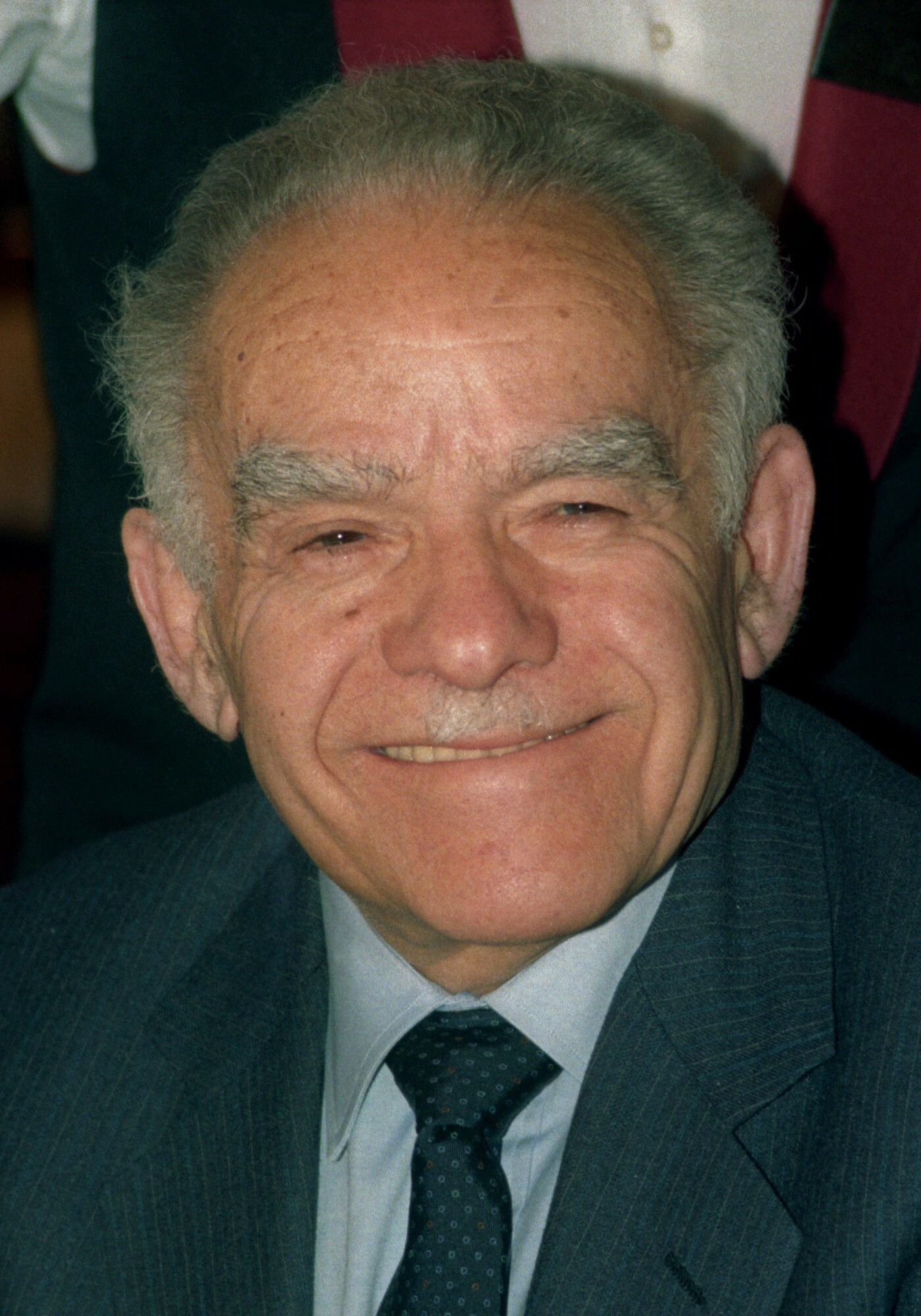

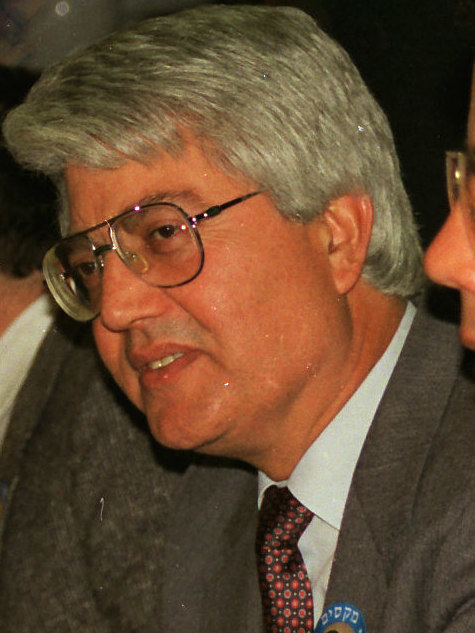

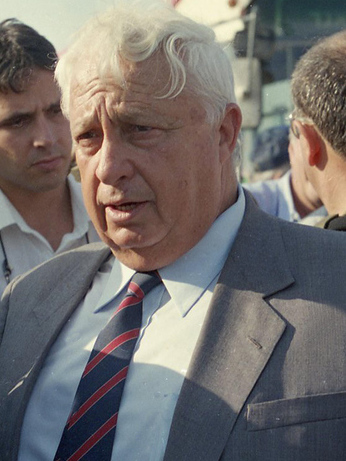
Candidate	Yitzhak Shamir	David Levy	Ariel Sharon
Popular vote	1,286	865	618
Percentage	46.4%	31.2%	22.3%
Leader before election
Yitzhak Shamir
Elected Leader
Yitzhak Shamir

The 1992 Likud leadership election was held on 20 February 1992 to elect the leader of the Likud party. It saw the members of Likud's Central Committee reelect incumbent leader and prime minister Yitzhak Shamir, who defeated challenges from David Levy and Ariel Sharon

== Background ==
The leadership election took place in advance of the 1992 Knesset election. Earlier on the same day as the Likud leadership election, the unofficial tally of the leadership election of the rival Israeli Labor Party showed Yitzhak Rabin as winning that party's leadership.

Both of Shamir's challengers had previously run against him for leadership (Levy in 1983 and Sharon in 1984).

== Candidates ==
- David Levy, minister of foreign affairs
- Yitzhak Shamir, incumbent leader and incumbent prime minister
- Ariel Sharon, minister of housing and construction

== Election procedure ==
The electorate for the leadership election were the 3,000 members of Likud's Central Committee. A week before the vote, the party moved to change the required threshold to avoid a runoff election to 40% from the previous 50%.

== Result ==
1992 Likud leadership election
Candidate	Votes	%
Yitzhak Shamir (incumbent)	1,286	46.4
David Levy	865	31.2
Ariel Sharon	618	22.3
