= Estee Shiraz =

American-Israeli businesswoman

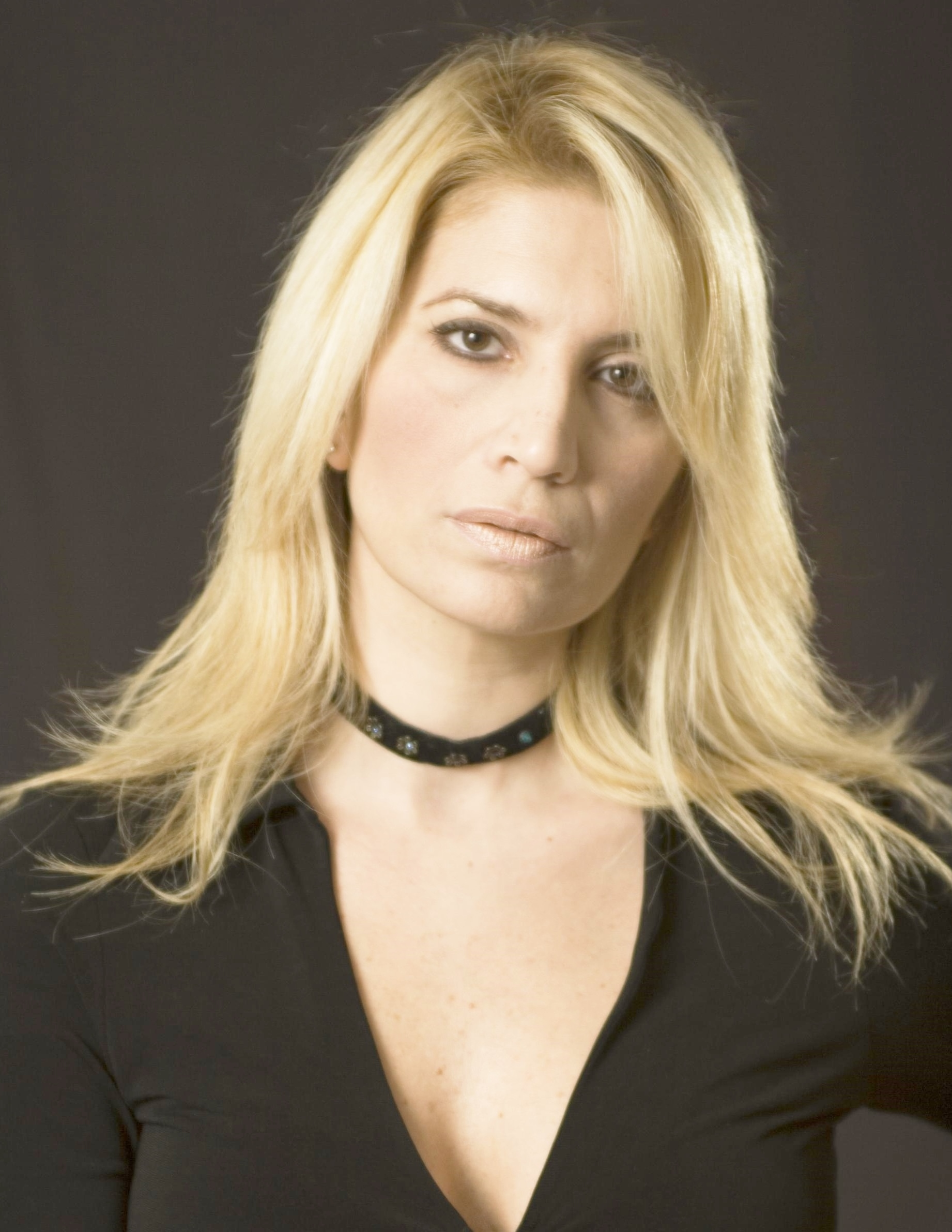
- Occupations: Attorney, entrepreneur, strategic communications adviser, television analyst and commentator
- Known for: Founder and former editor-in-chief of Promise Lifestyle Magazine; Founder and chair of Israel Goes World; Political and legal analysis, strategic communications, and mediation
- Children: Melanie Shiraz Asor (1998), Tommy Ayden Shiraz (2011)

Estee (Etty) Shiraz (Hebrew: אסתי שירז), is an Israeli–American attorney, entrepreneur, strategic communications adviser, television analyst and commentator, and family mediator certified by the Florida Supreme Court. She is the founder of an American lifestyle magazine and a nonprofit organization dedicated to strengthening support for Israel through non-political civic, cultural, and public-advocacy initiatives.

== Early life and career ==
Born and raised in Tel Aviv, Israel, Shiraz began her career as the spokesperson and director of public relations for the Opera Tower residential and commercial center, completed by the Alrov Group.

Shiraz joined Spot Productions Ltd., serving as VP of marketing and public relations for the startup TV series Deadly Fortune (Kesef Katlani). The series initially aired during prime time on Channel 2 for its first two seasons, and later on Channel 3 for seasons three and four, consistently topping Israeli television ratings. The show featured actors Nathan Ravitz, Rafi Tavor, Aharon Ipale, and Yossi Graber in leading roles and was also sold to broadcasting channels in Europe.

== Politics ==
In 2000, Shiraz entered politics and was appointed head of communications at the 'Gesher' political party and its associated non-profit organization. In November 2002, she was elected by the party's members as its leader after David Levy, the founder and leader, returned to the Likud party. Shiraz led 'Gesher' in the elections for the 16th Israeli parliament, the Knesset. This move sparked a significant and legal process in the subsequent years, with David Levy seeking to dissolve Gesher and integrate it entirely into the Likud, while Shiraz and other party members aimed to maintain its independence and transform it into a modern social party, appealing to Israel's young academics and professionals.

The Court instructed the Central Elections Committee to remove the Gesher Knesset list during this process. Subsequently, Shiraz was appointed director of operations and campaign advisor to Dr. Lea Nass-Arden – an initially relatively-unknown candidate. Shiraz built the campaign around Nass being the only religious woman in the Likud primary elections for the 16th Knesset. The strategy led to Nass securing the 36th position on the Likud list, with the party winning 38 seats that year. Nass-Arden became a Knesset member, and later the deputy minister of pensioner affairs. Shiraz moved with her family to the US in 2003, and the legal proceedings regarding Gesher continued until 2007, when the court ruled that Gesher would cease to exist as a political party.

== Roles and initiatives ==
In 2003, Shiraz and her family relocated to Miami, Florida, where she founded Promise Lifestyle Magazine to cater to the Jewish American population. The publication featured in-depth profiles and interviews with prominent business people, public figures, and celebrities such as Michael Douglas, Barbra Streisand, Adam Sandler, Ben Stiller, Dustin Hoffman, and Natalie Portman. Renowned contributors over the years included Dr. Ruth Westheimer, Uri Geller, and Bernie De Koven. The publication launched in Miami and quickly achieved significant success, expanding its reach to South Florida, New York, Los Angeles, and Atlanta. Six years after its inception, Shiraz made a strategic exit, selling the publication while continuing to serve as a consultant.

In 2005–2006, Shiraz served as the chairperson of the Ft. Lauderdale-Haifa sister cities, and a member of the board of directors for the Greater Ft. Lauderdale Sister Cities International non-profit organization (GFLSCI). The organization's mission is to foster municipal partnerships between US cities and states and their counterparts in other nations.

In 2009, Shiraz founded a communications and PR firm. She was honored as 'Woman of Excellence' by the National Association of Professional & Executive Women and has received numerous awards, including the American Graphic Design Award, Benjamin Franklin Award and Florida Print Award for strategic communication materials she developed and executed with her team.

In 2014, Shiraz relocated to Beverly Hills, California, and joined the Israeli American Council as the head of the National Israeli-American Conference in Washington, D.C. She returned to Miami, Florida, in 2018.

== Current activity ==
In recent years, Shiraz has appeared regularly on several television channels as a commentator, analyst, and panelist on political, legal, and current affairs. In 2023, she was appointed executive director of WIZO Florida, the Florida division of the Women's International Zionist Organization.

Shiraz is an attorney, arbitrator, legal adviser, and family mediator certified by the Florida Supreme Court. Since 2013, she has worked in high-conflict dispute resolution while continuing her work as a strategic communications expert, television analyst, and commentator. Her mediation experience includes disputes involving divorce, civil harassment, domestic violence, and small claims. She has also served as a panel mediator for the Center for Conflict Resolution (CCR) and the California Academy of Mediation Professionals (CAMP). During her time in California, she participated in professional mediation training and observation sessions involving attorneys and MBA students affiliated with the alternative dispute resolution programs at the USC Gould School of Law and the Pepperdine University Caruso School of Law. Shiraz is also the founder of a nonprofit organization dedicated to advocacy for the State of Israel.

Shiraz earned a bachelor's degree with a double major in education and humanities from Tel Aviv University, graduating magna cum laude, followed by a master's degree in political science and mass communications from Bar-Ilan University. She later earned a Bachelor of Laws degree and an LL.M. from Tel Aviv University, as well as a master's degree in legal studies from the College of Law and Business, graduating magna cum laude. Earlier in her career, she worked explored modeling and working aboard cruise ships. She resides in Miami, Florida.
