= Mordechai Mishani =

Israeli politician

- מרדכי משעני
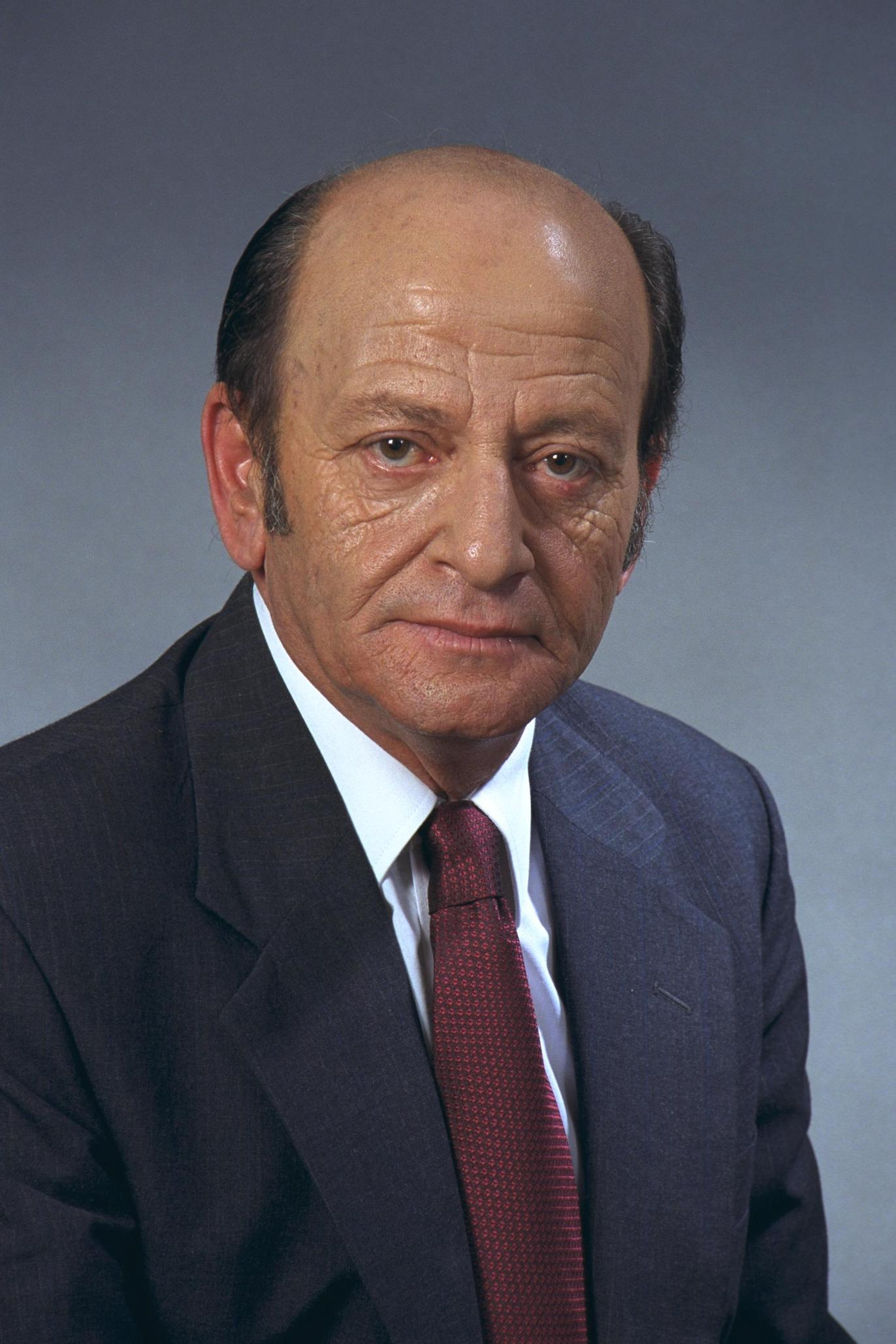
- Mishani in the early 2000s

Faction represented in the Knesset
- 2001: One Israel
- 2001–2003: Gesher

Personal details
- Born: 10 April 1945 Tel Aviv, Mandatory Palestine
- Died: 9 April 2013 (aged 67)

Mordechai "Motti" Mishani (Hebrew: מרדכי "מוטי" משעני; 10 April 1945 – 9 April 2013) was an Israeli politician who served as a member of the Knesset for One Israel and Gesher between 2001 and 2003.

== Biography ==
Born in Tel Aviv during the Mandate era, Mishani studied law before working as an attorney.

A member of Gesher, he was placed 29th on the One Israel list (an alliance of Labor, Meimad and Gesher) for the 1999 elections, but missed out on a seat when the alliance won only 26 seats. However, he entered the Knesset on 17 February 2001 as a replacement for Eli Goldschmidt. On 7 March Gesher left the One Israel alliance to sit as an independent party. Prior to the 2003 elections Mishani joined Likud, but after only being placed 102nd on the party's list, he lost his seat.

Mishani died on 9 April 2013.
