= Yitzhak Shamir =

Prime Minister of Israel (1983–1984; 1986–1992)

- יצחק שמיר
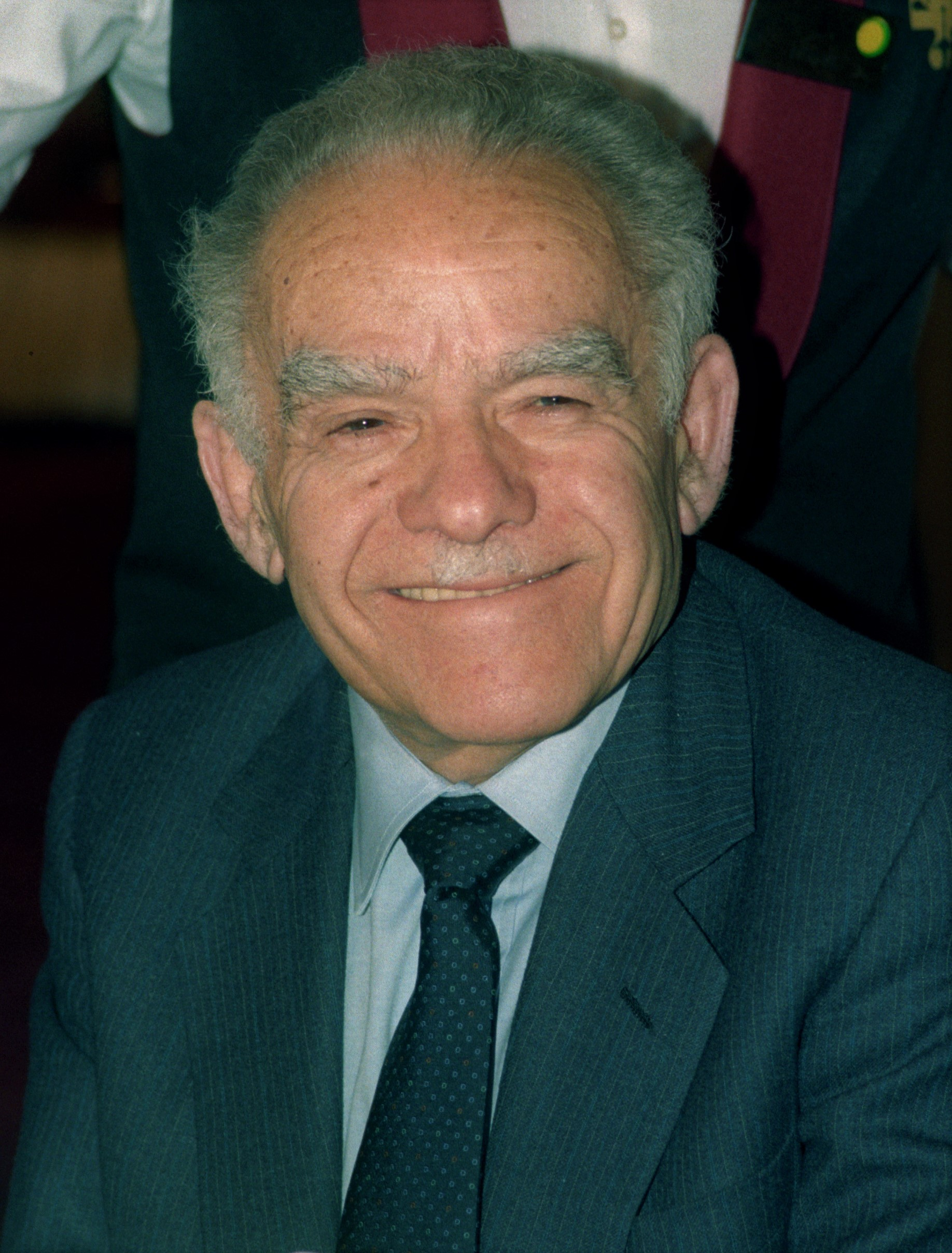
- Shamir in 1992

Prime Minister of Israel
- In office 20 October 1986 – 13 July 1992
- President: Chaim Herzog
- Preceded by: Shimon Peres
- Succeeded by: Yitzhak Rabin
- In office 10 October 1983 – 13 September 1984
- President: Chaim Herzog
- Preceded by: Menachem Begin
- Succeeded by: Shimon Peres

Leader of the Opposition
- De facto 13 July 1992 – 24 March 1993
- Prime Minister: Yitzhak Rabin
- Preceded by: Yitzhak Rabin
- Succeeded by: Benjamin Netanyahu

Chairman of Likud
- In office 26 August 1988 – 24 March 1993
- Preceded by: Unified party created
- Succeeded by: Benjamin Netanyahu

Chairman of Herut
- In office 10 October 1983 – 26 August 1988
- Preceded by: Menachem Begin
- Succeeded by: Merged into Likud

Speaker of the Knesset
- In office 13 June 1977 – 10 March 1980
- Preceded by: Yisrael Yeshayahu
- Succeeded by: Yitzhak Berman

Minister of Foreign Affairs
- In office 10 March 1980 – 20 October 1986
- Prime Minister: Menachem Begin; Himself; Shimon Peres
- Preceded by: Menachem Begin
- Succeeded by: Shimon Peres

Member of the Knesset
- In office 21 January 1974 – 17 June 1996

Personal details
- Born: Yitzhak Yezernitsky; 22 October 1915 Ruzhinoy, Bialystok-Grodno District, Ober Ost (now Ruzhany, Brest Oblast, Belarus)
- Died: 30 June 2012 (aged 96) Tel Aviv, Israel
- Party: Likud (1970‍–‍1998; 2003‍–‍2011)
- Other political affiliations: Fighters' List (1948–1959); National Union (1999–2003)
- Spouse: Shulamit Levy (m. 1944; died 2011)
- Children: 2, including Yair

Yitzhak Shamir (Hebrew: יצחק שמיר,; born Yitzhak Yezernitsky; 22 October 1915 – 30 June 2012) was an Israeli politician who served as the seventh prime minister of Israel, serving two terms (1983–1984, 1986–1992). Before the establishment of the State of Israel, Shamir was a leader of the Zionist militant group Lehi, also known as the Stern Gang.

Yitzhak Shamir grew up in interwar Poland. Shamir joined Betar, the paramilitary wing of Revisionist Zionist Ze'ev Jabotinsky's Hatzohar political party. In 1935, Shamir emigrated from Białystok to British Palestine, where he worked in an accountant's office. Shamir joined the Revisionist Zionist Irgun paramilitary group led by Menachem Begin. During World War II the Irgun split over the question of whether to support the Axis powers against the British Empire. Avraham Stern and Shamir sought an alliance with Fascist Italy and Nazi Germany and formed the breakaway militia group Lehi. Lehi was unable to persuade the Axis powers to lend it support. Shamir led Lehi after Stern's assassination in 1942. In 1944 Shamir married Lehi member Shulamit Levy. During the 1948 Palestine war, Lehi and the Irgun committed the Deir Yassin massacre of over 100 Palestinians.

After the establishment of the Israeli state Shamir served in Mossad between 1955 and 1965. Shamir directed Operation Damocles and resigned from Mossad after Prime Minister David Ben-Gurion ordered an end to the program. In 1969 Shamir joined Menachem Begin's Herut Party. Shamir was first elected to the Knesset in 1973 as a member of the Likud alliance of parties. Shamir served as Speaker of the Knesset after Likud became the first right-wing Israeli government after winning the 1977 Israeli legislative election against Prime Minister Shimon Peres' Alignment. Shamir was named Foreign Minister by Prime Minister Begin in 1980 and would serve in this post until 1986. Shamir was Foreign Minister during the 1982 Israel invasion of Lebanon.

Shamir won the 1983 Herut leadership election to succeed Begin as party leader, which made him Prime Minister and leader of the Likud after a merger. Prime Minister Yitzhak Shamir lost the 1984 election to Peres. Peres and Shamir entered into a grand coalition deal where Peres became prime minister while Shamir remained foreign minister until 1986, when Peres and Shamir traded jobs. The First Intifada began in 1987 and Shamir resisted a two-state solution to the Israeli–Palestinian conflict. Shamir unified the Likud alliance into one party in 1988. Shamir reluctantly restarted the Israeli–Palestinian peace process at the behest of the United States and Soviet Union which culminated in the Madrid Conference of 1991. Shamir lost the 1992 Israeli legislative election to Yitzhak Rabin and in 1993 Benjamin Netanyahu replaced him as Likud leader.

== Early life ==
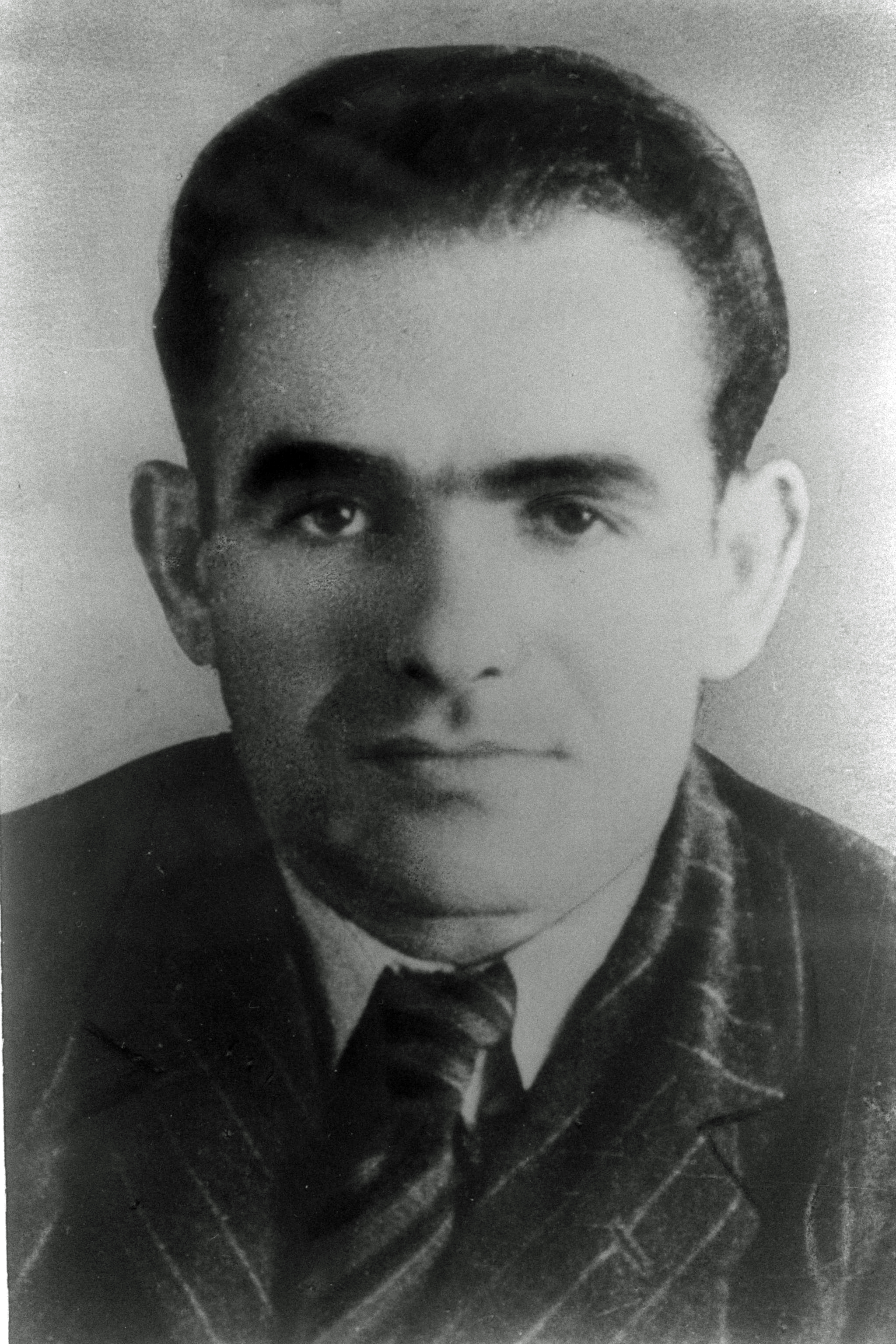
Shamir in 1938

Yitzhak Yezernitsky was born in the predominantly Jewish village of Ruzhany, Bialystok-Grodno District of Ober Ost, shortly thereafter incorporated into the Kingdom of Poland (now in Belarus), as the son of Perla and Shlomo, owner of a leather factory. Shamir later moved to Białystok and studied at a Hebrew high school network. As a youth, Yezernitsky joined Betar, the Revisionist Zionist youth movement. Yezernitsky studied law at the University of Warsaw, but cut his studies short in order to emigrate to what was then Mandatory Palestine in 1935. Shamir was the surname Yitzhak Yezernitsky used on a forged underground identity card. Once in British Palestine, Yitzhak Yezernitsky changed his surname to Shamir. He later said Shamir means a thorn that stabs and a rock that can cut steel. Shamir initially worked in an accountant's office.

== Lehi leadership ==
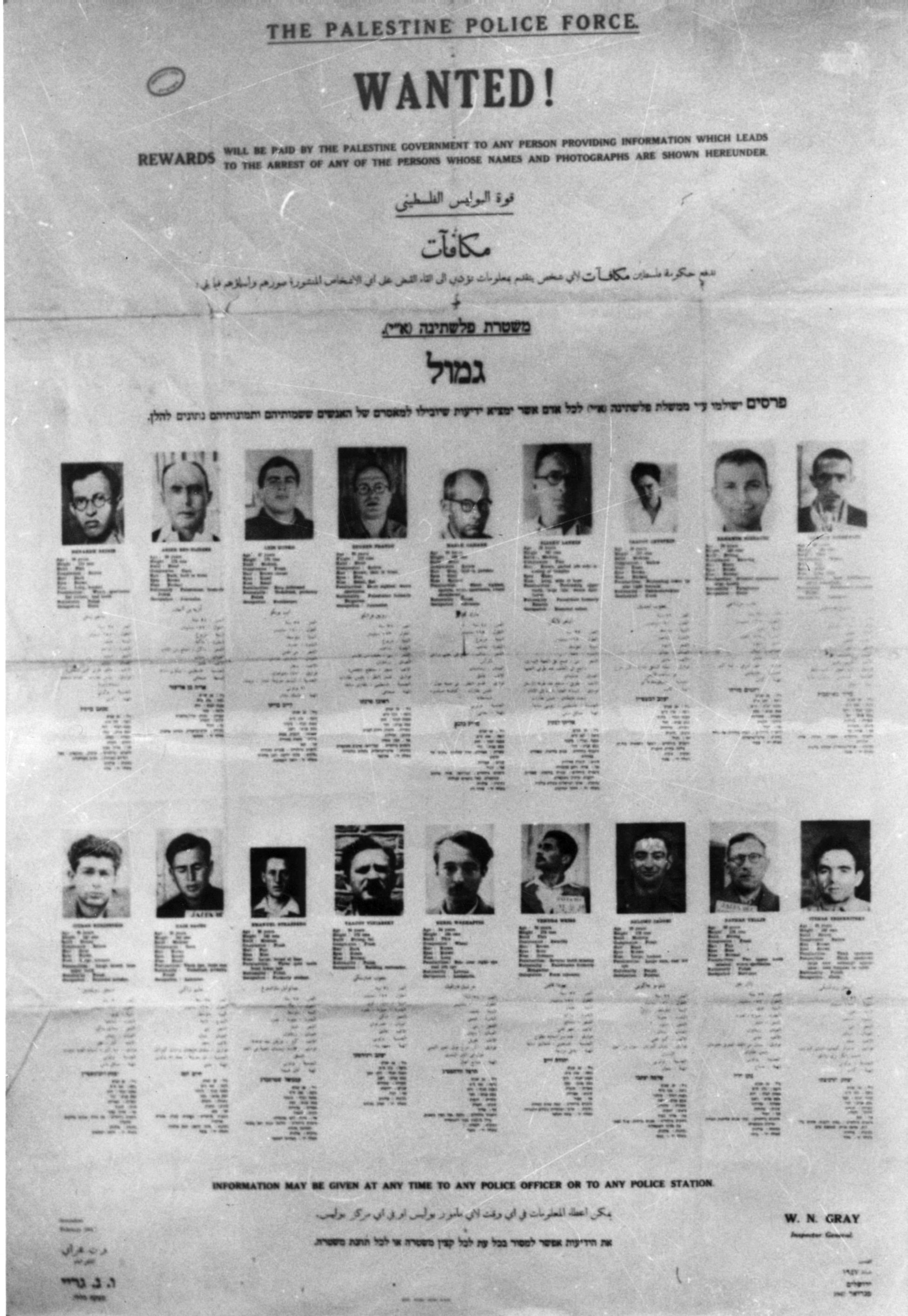
Wanted poster of the Palestine Police Force for Irgun members, showing Menachem Begin (top row, far left) and Yitzhak Shamir (bottom row, far right)

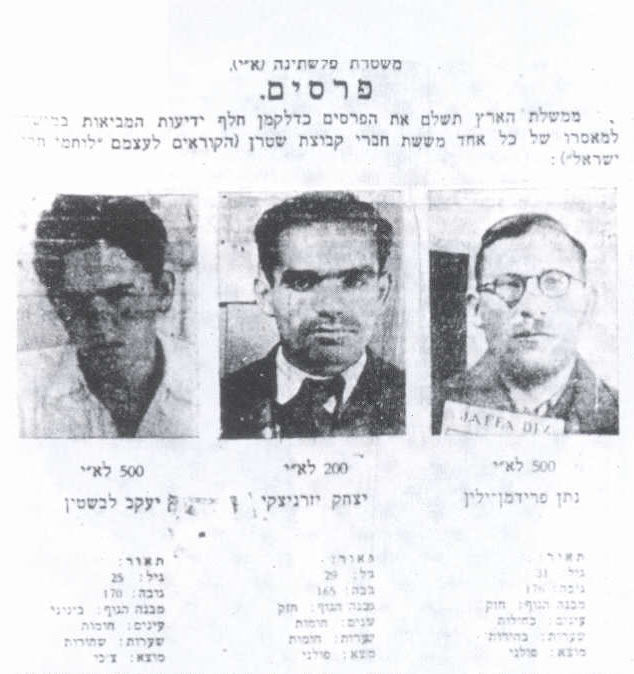
Wanted poster of the Palestine Police Force offering rewards for the capture of Lehi members: Yaakov Levstein (Eliav), left, Yitzhak Yezernitzky (Shamir), center, and Natan Friedman-Yelin (Yellin-Mor), right

Shamir joined the Irgun Zvai Leumi, a Zionist paramilitary group that opposed British control of Palestine. During World War II the Irgun split over the question of whether to support the Axis powers against the British Empire. Avraham Stern and Shamir sought an alliance with Fascist Italy and Nazi Germany and formed the more militant breakaway militia group Lehi.

Lehi was unable to persuade the Axis powers to lend it support and became widely known as the Stern Gang. Yitzhak Shamir was imprisoned by British authorities in 1941. A few months after Stern was killed by the British in 1942, Shamir and Eliyahu Giladi hid under a stack of mattresses in a warehouse of the detention camp at Mazra'a, and at night escaped through the barbed wire fences of the camp. Shamir became the leader of the Stern Gang, and, together with Giladi, Anshell Shpillman and Yehoshua Cohen, reorganized the movement into cells and trained its members. In his memoirs, Shamir admitted in 1994 what had long been suspected: that the killing of Giladi in 1943 was ordered by Shamir himself, allegedly due to Giladi advocating the assassination of David Ben-Gurion, and arguing for other violence deemed too extremist by fellow Stern members.

Lehi leadership consisted of a troika of Yitzhak Shamir, Nathan Yellin-Mor and Israel Eldad. Shamir sought to emulate the anti-British struggle of the Irish Republicans and took the nickname "Michael" after Irish Republican leader Michael Collins. Shamir plotted the 1944 assassination of Lord Moyne, British Minister for Middle East Affairs, and personally selected Eliyahu Hakim and Eliyahu Bet-Zuri to carry it out. Moyne had been targeted due to his perceived role as an architect of British restrictions on Jewish immigration to Palestine, and in particular, the Patria disaster, which was blamed on him.

In 1944 Shamir married fellow Lehi member Shulamit, Shamir had first met Shulamit in a detention camp where she was incarcerated after the ship on which she sailed to Mandate Palestine from Bulgaria in 1941 was declared illegal. They would have two children, Yair and Gilada.

Shamir's parents and two sisters were murdered in the Holocaust. Shamir claimed his father was killed just outside his birthplace in Ruzhany by villagers who had been his childhood friends after he had escaped from a German train transporting Jews to the death camps, though this was never confirmed. His mother and a sister were murdered in the concentration camps, and another sister was shot dead. Shamir once told Ehud Olmert that when his father, living under Nazi occupation, had been informed that the extermination of the Jews was imminent, his father had replied that "I have a son in the Land of Israel, and he will exact my revenge on them".

In July 1946, Shamir was arrested during Operation Shark, a cordon and search operation of Tel Aviv carried out by the British Army and Palestine Police following the King David Hotel bombing during which most of the population was screened. A British police sergeant, T.G. Martin, recognized him by his bushy eyebrows. Arrested, he was exiled to Africa, and interned in Eritrea by British Mandatory authorities. Lehi members subsequently tracked down and killed Martin in September 1946. On 14 January 1947, Shamir and four Irgun members escaped the Sembel Prison (a British Detention Camp) through a tunnel they had dug, 200 feet in length, and Mayer Malka of Khartoum subsequently arranged for them to be hidden in an oil truck for three days as it was driven over the border to French Somaliland. They were re-arrested by the French authorities, but Shamir with Malka's assistance was eventually allowed passage to France and granted political asylum. Lehi sent him a forged passport, with which he entered Israel after the Israeli Declaration of Independence in 1948.

During the 1948 Arab–Israeli War, Lehi became most famous for the Deir Yassin massacre. From 9 to 11 April 1948, around 130 fighters from Irgun and Lehi violated a peace deal with the village of Deir Yassin and killed at least 107 Palestinian Arab villagers, nearly all civilians.

After the backlash to the massacre, the Lehi troika of Shamir, Eldad, and Yellin-Mor formally disbanded most of the organization on 29 May 1948 but continued to lead a minority of the membership from Jerusalem. Lehi leadership continued to be outside of Israeli government control while most of its former membership joined the newly formed Israel Defense Forces.

During a UN-imposed truce, Shamir, Eldad, and Yellin-Mor authorized the assassination of the United Nations representative in the Middle East, Count Folke Bernadotte, who was killed in September 1948, when Lehi gunmen ambushed his motorcade in Jerusalem. Lehi had feared that Israel would agree to Bernadotte's peace proposals, which they considered disastrous, unaware that the provisional Israeli government had already rejected a proposal by Bernadotte the day before. The Israeli provisional government drafted an ordinance for the prevention of terrorism and then invoked it to declare Lehi a terrorist organisation, consequently rounding up 200 of its members for "administrative detention" (prison). They were granted amnesty some months later and given a state pardon.

== Mossad ==
In the first years of Israel's independence, Shamir managed several commercial enterprises. In 1955, he joined Mossad, serving until 1965. During his Mossad career, he directed Operation Damocles, the assassinations of German rocket scientists working on the Egyptian missile programme.

He ran a unit that placed agents in hostile countries, created the Mossad's division for planning and served on its General Staff.

Shamir resigned from the Mossad in protest over the treatment of Mossad Director-General Isser Harel, who had been compelled to resign after Prime Minister David Ben-Gurion ordered an end to Operation Damocles.

== Political career ==
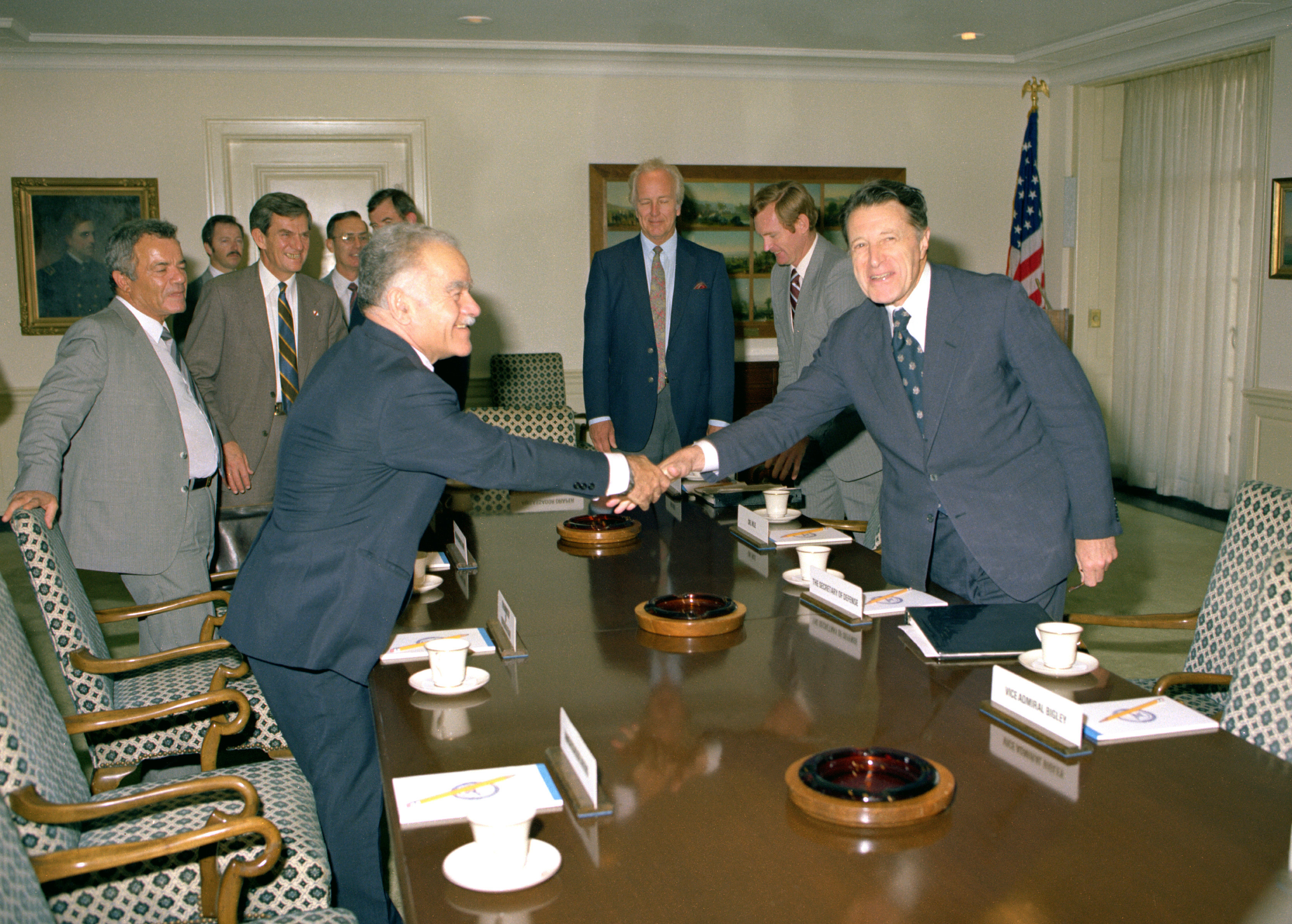
Foreign Minister Shamir with US Secretary of Defense Caspar Weinberger, 1982

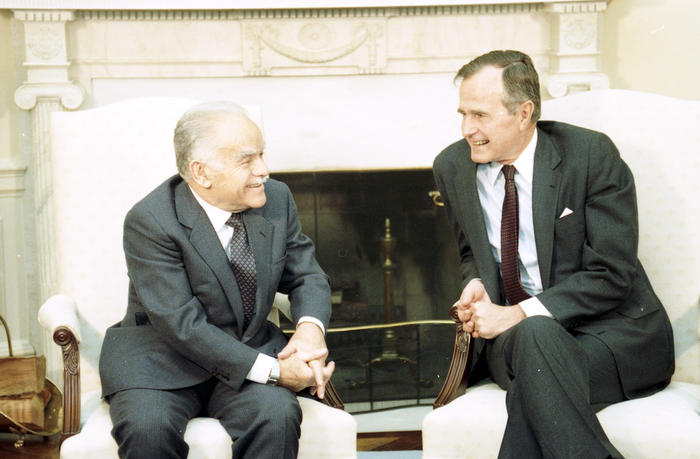
Shamir meeting with US President George H. W. Bush at the White House, 1990

In 1969, Shamir joined the Herut party headed by Menachem Begin and was first elected to the Knesset in 1973 as a member of the Likud. He became Speaker of the Knesset in 1977, and Foreign Minister in 1980 which he remained until 1986, concurrently serving as prime minister from October 1983 to September 1984 after Begin's resignation.

Shamir had a reputation as a Likud hard-liner. In 1977 he presided at the Knesset visit of Egyptian President Anwar Sadat. He abstained in the Knesset votes to approve the Camp David Accords and the Peace Treaty with Egypt. In 1981 and 1982, as Foreign Minister, he guided negotiations with Egypt to normalize relations after the treaty. Following the 1982 Lebanon War he directed negotiations which led to the May 17 Agreement with Lebanon in 1983, which did not materialize.

=== Prime minister ===
Shamir won the 1983 Herut leadership election against David Levy to succeed Begin as leader of Herut, the Likud, and Prime Minister of Israel. Shamir won reelection as party leader in the 1984 Herut leadership election, defeating a challenge from Ariel Sharon. His failure to stabilize Israel's inflationary economy and to suggest a solution to the quagmire of Lebanon led to an indecisive election in 1984. Shamir lost the election but was able to retain his post as foreign minister in a national unity government between the Likud alliance and the Alignment led by Prime Minister Shimon Peres. As part of the agreement, Peres held the post of Prime Minister until September 1986, when Shamir returned to the prime ministership and Peres became foreign minister.

As he prepared to reclaim the office of prime minister, Shamir's hard-line image appeared to moderate. However, Shamir remained reluctant to change the status quo in Israel's relations with its Arab neighbours and blocked Peres's initiative to promote a regional peace conference as agreed in 1987 with King Hussein of Jordan in what has become known as the London Agreement. Re-elected in 1988, Shamir and Peres formed a new coalition government until "the dirty trick" of 1990, when the Alignment left the government, leaving Shamir with a narrow right-wing coalition. During this period the Palestinians in the West Bank and Gaza Strip launched the first Intifada, which was suppressed with force by the Israeli government.

Shamir urged the US government to stop granting refugee visas to Soviet Jews, persuading it that they were not refugees because they already had a homeland in Israel and were only moving to the United States for economic reasons. He also termed the emigration of Soviet Jews to the United States rather than to Israel "defection", and called the issuing of US refugee visas to Soviet Jews when Israel was already willing to take them in "an insult to Israel". In 1989, a wave of Jewish emigration began from the Soviet Union after the Soviets allowed their Jewish population to emigrate freely. In October of that year, the US agreed to his requests and stopped issuing refugee visas to Soviet emigrants. Subsequently, Israel became the main destination of Soviet Jewish emigrants. Over one million Soviet immigrants would subsequently arrive in Israel, many of whom would have likely gone to the United States had Shamir not pressed the US government to change its policy.

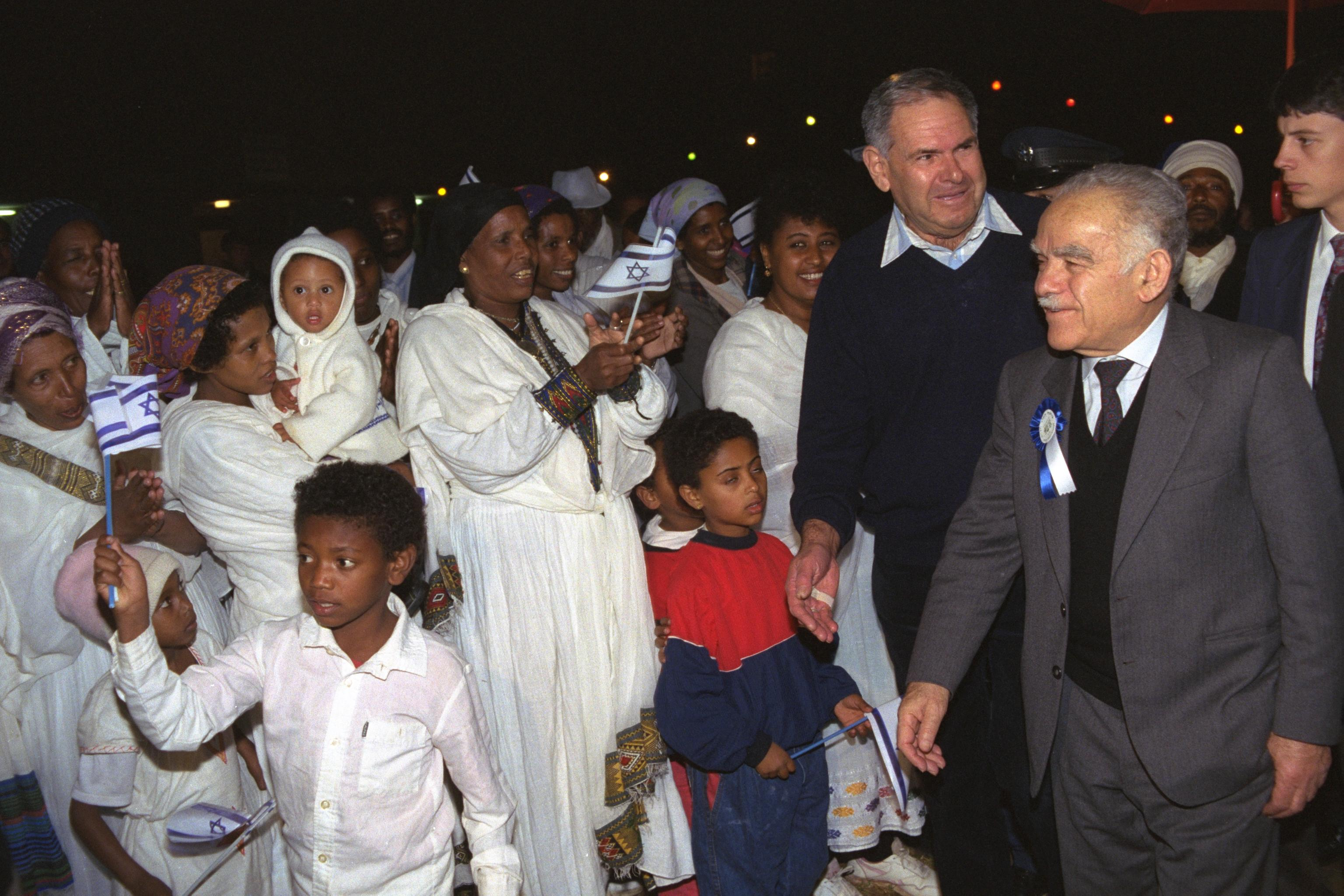
Shamir greets new immigrants from Ethiopia, 1991

In September 1989, a journalist for The Jerusalem Post asked Shamir, "Doesn't it amaze you that in Poland, where hardly a Jew is left, there should still be a powerful anti-Semitic presence?" Shamir replied "They suck it in with their mother's milk! This is something that is deeply imbued in their tradition, their mentality." The comment caused public and diplomatic controversy within Poland as being libelous. Adam Michnik later addressed the comment by stating "the stubborn categorization of Poland as an anti-Semitic nation was used in Europe and America as an alibi for the betrayal of Poland at Yalta. The nation so categorized was seen as unworthy of sympathy, or of help, or of compassion."

In a 1996 interview with the Polish newspaper Rzeczpospolita, Shamir said the controversy was based on a misunderstanding of what he said:

Once these words were published out of context, I did not find it necessary to straighten them out, because any reasonable person should understand that they should not be read literally. It is known that mother's food does not contain any ingredients that affect the formation of an infant's consciousness when it grows up and begins to think. These words were a metaphor to express the idea that anti-Semitic feelings or views, as well as many other positive and negative feelings and views, come from the family home.

During the Gulf War, Iraq fired Scud missiles at Israel, many of which struck population centers. Iraq hoped to provoke Israeli retaliation and thus alienate Arab members of the United States-assembled coalition against Iraq. Shamir deployed Israeli Air Force jets to patrol the northern airspace with Iraq. However, after the United States and the Netherlands deployed Patriot antimissile batteries to protect Israel, and US and British special forces began hunting for Scuds, Shamir responded to American calls for restraint, recalled the jets, and agreed not to retaliate.

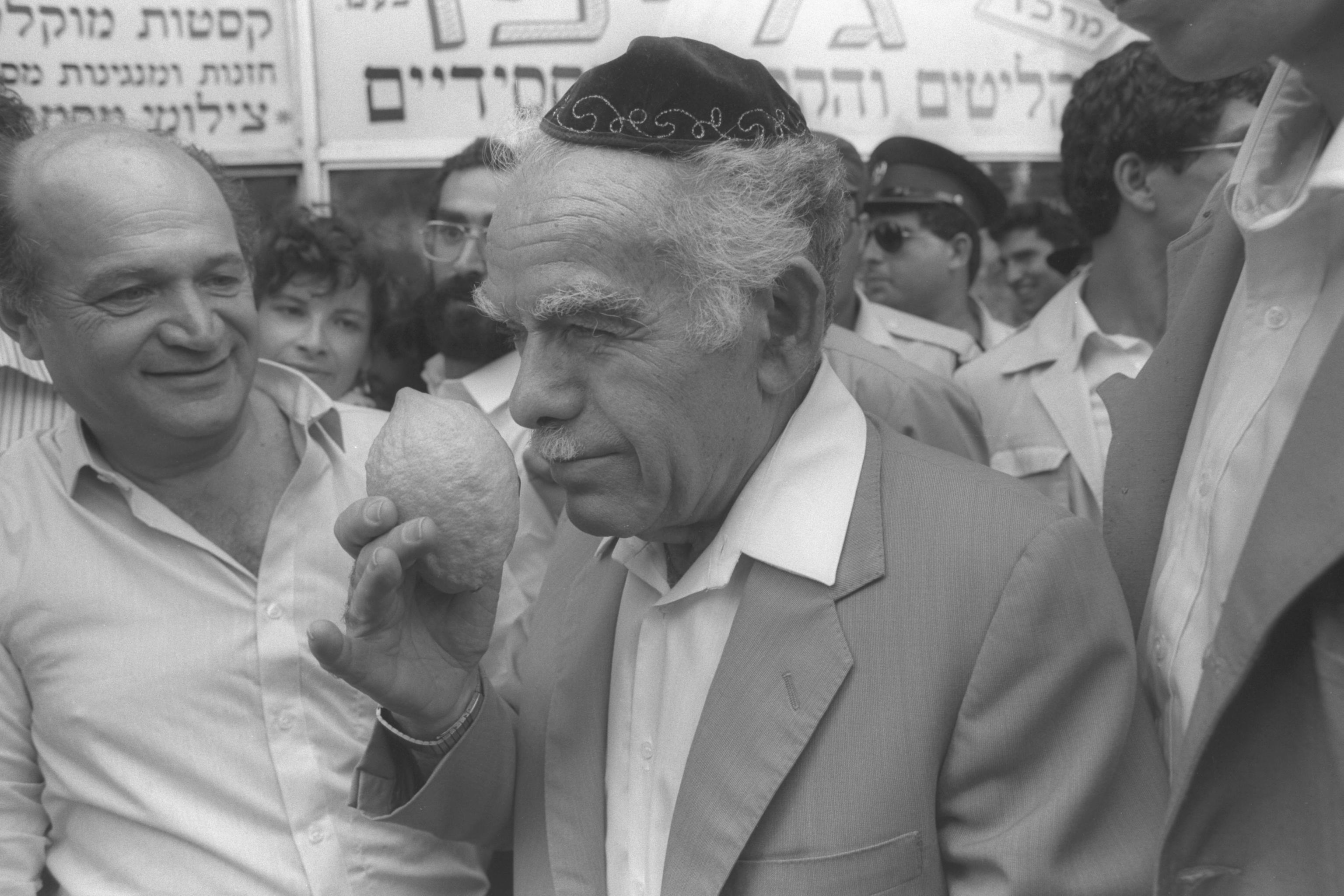
Prime Minister Yitzhak Shamir sniffs an ethrog during his visit to the Sukkot market in the Geula quarter in Jerusalem, 1988

During his term, Shamir reestablished diplomatic relations between Israel and several dozen African, Asian and other countries. In May 1991, as the Ethiopian government of Mengistu Haile Mariam was collapsing, Shamir ordered the airlifting of 14,000 Ethiopian Jews, known as Operation Solomon. He continued his efforts, begun in the late 1960s, to bring Soviet Jewish refugees to Israel. Shamir restored diplomatic relations between the Soviet Union and Israel in October 1991, and following its dissolution, established relations between Israel and his native Belarus in May 1992. Shamir was dedicated to bringing Jews from all over the world to Israel, and called on American Jews to emigrate to Israel in spite of a higher standard of living in the US, saying that he expected even American Jewish youth to realize that "man does not live by bread alone" but to "learn and understand Jewish history, the Bible... and reach the only conclusion: to come on aliya to Israel."

Relations with the US were strained in the period after the war over the Madrid peace talks, which Shamir opposed. As a result, US President George H. W. Bush was reluctant to approve loan guarantees to help absorb immigrants from the former Soviet Union. Finally, Shamir gave in and in October 1991 participated in the Madrid talks. His narrow, right-wing government collapsed, and new elections were necessarily called.

In a February 1992 leadership election, Shamir retained his leadership of Likud, defeating challenges from David Levy and Ariel Sharon.

One of Shamir's last acts as Prime Minister was to approve the 16 February 1992 assassination of the leader of Hizbullah, Sheikh Abbas al-Musawi.

=== Electoral defeat and retirement ===
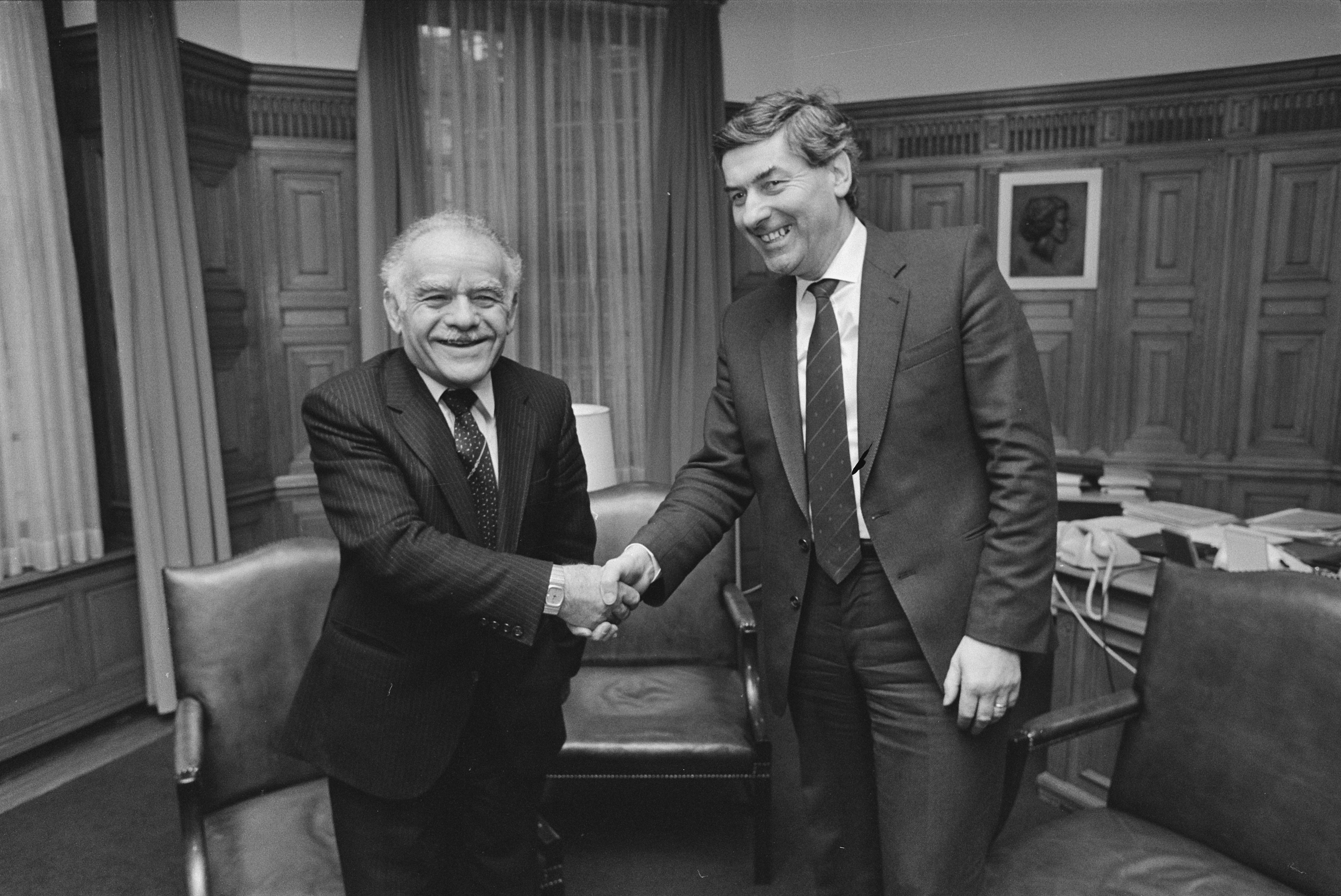
Prime Minister Yitzhak Shamir with Ruud Lubbers, 1985

Shamir was defeated by Yitzhak Rabin's Labour in the 1992 election. He stepped down from the Likud leadership in March 1993 but remained a member of the Knesset until the 1996 election. For some time, Shamir was a critic of his Likud successor, Benjamin Netanyahu, as being too indecisive in dealing with the Arabs. Shamir went so far as to resign from the Likud in 1998 and endorse Herut, a right-wing splinter movement led by Benny Begin, which later joined the National Union during the 1999 election. After Netanyahu was defeated, Shamir returned to the Likud fold and supported Ariel Sharon in the 2001 election. He was placed honorary 120th last spot on the Likud list in the 2003 Israeli legislative election. Subsequently, in his late eighties, Shamir ceased making public comments.

== Illness and death ==
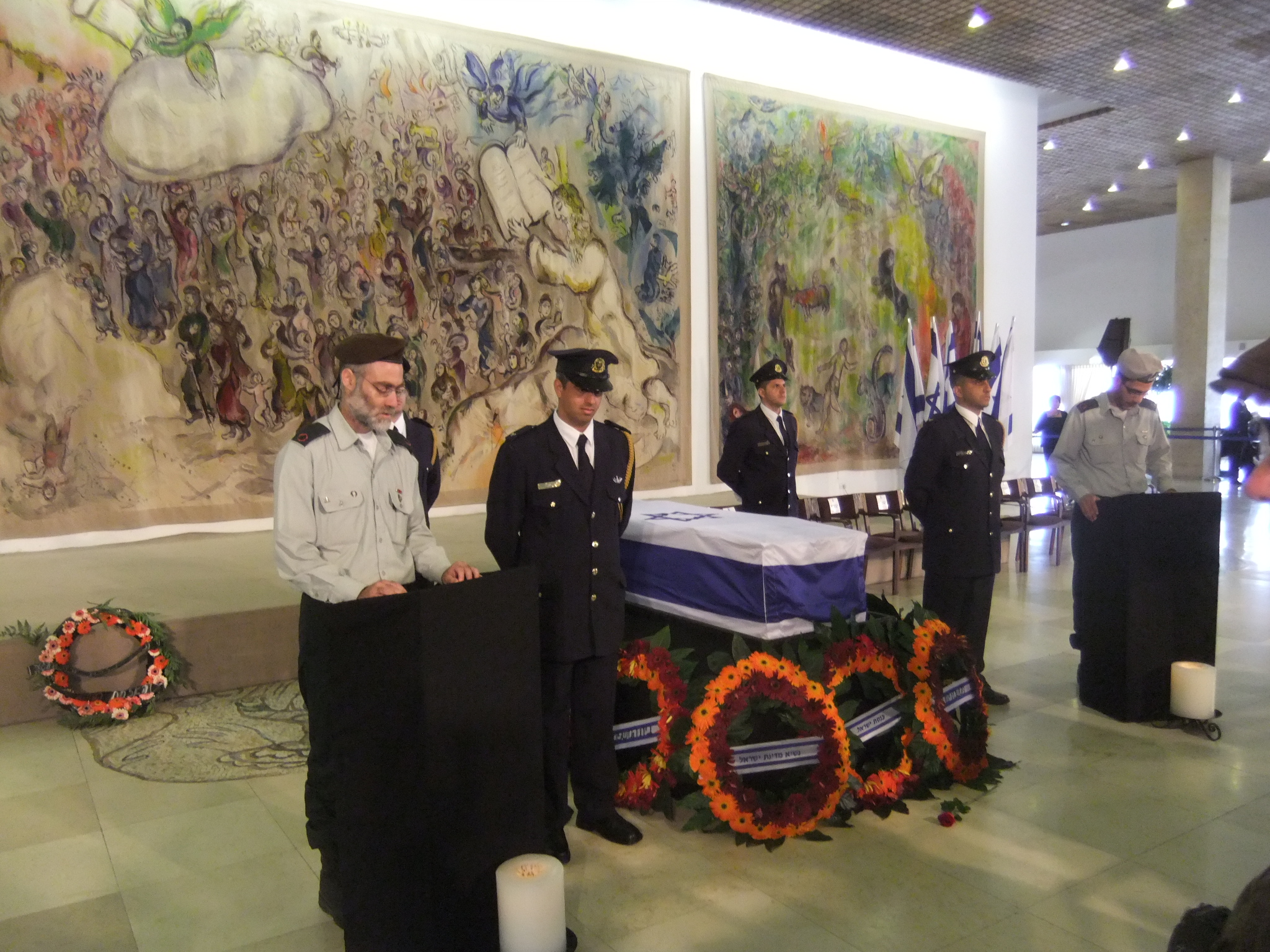
Yitzhak Shamir's coffin lying in state in the Knesset, July 2, 2012

In 2004, Shamir's health declined, with the progression of his Alzheimer's disease, and he was moved to a nursing home. The government turned down a request by the family to finance his stay at the facility.

Shulamit Shamir died on 29 July 2011. Less than a year later, Yitzhak Shamir died on the morning of 30 June 2012, at a nursing home in Tel Aviv where he had spent the last few years as a result of the Alzheimer's disease he had suffered since the mid-1990s. He was given a state funeral, which took place on 2 July at Mount Herzl, Jerusalem, and was buried beside his wife, Shulamit, who had died the previous year. As his body was lying in state Speaker of the Knesset Reuven Rivlin laid a wreath on his coffin and said:

You're cast stone, Isaac, unbreakable. Bearing on your shoulders the burden of this nation the past and the future. Remembering in your heart the ashes of the crematoria and the hope of redemption. Nothing could distract you out of your way. Iron tools and weapons of destruction could not touch you, could not threaten you. Flattery, bribery, and double talk—were never on your tongue, were not part of your language. Only one small weakness relentlessly gnawed at you. Only one small weakness managed to break through the solid rock to carve the stones, and build from them the foundations to establish the kingdom of Israel. It was love: Your love of this persecuted people; your love of the homeland of our fathers, of the land of eternity; your love of your children, your home; your love of your Shulamit. ... Sir, commander of Israel's Freedom Fighters, my man, Speaker of the Israeli Knesset, my honored Prime Minister of Israel and an eternal soldier. On my behalf, on behalf of your friends and subordinates; on behalf of the congregation of Israel, on behalf of anonymous soldiers, in the service of the country and in the underground; in the name of the State of Israel, we bow our heads to you. You were dedicated to the people all your life, and now 'from duty be released only by death.' In a few hours we'll say our goodbyes, when you'll be interred in the ground of Jerusalem, the ground of this good land, for which you have lived and fought.

Shamir was buried at Mount Herzl.

=== Commemoration ===
Israeli President Shimon Peres said that "Yitzhak Shamir was a brave warrior for Israel, before and after its inception. He was a great patriot and his enormous contribution will be forever etched in our chronicles. He was loyal to his beliefs and he served his country with the utmost dedication for decades. May he rest in peace." Prime Minister Benjamin Netanyahu's office issued a statement upon hearing of his death that read: "[Shamir] led Israel with a deep loyalty to the nation. [The Prime Minister] expresses his deep pain over the announcement of the departure of Yitzhak Shamir. He was part of a marvelous generation which created the state of Israel and struggled for the Jewish people." This was despite previous feuds between the two once-Likud members. He was also mourned in the Knesset.

Foreign Minister Avigdor Lieberman added that Shamir "contributed greatly to the foundation of the state, which he served his entire life with loyalty and unwavering dedication. He set an example in each position that he held. I had the privilege to be personally acquainted with Shamir, and I will always remember him and his great contribution to the state;" while Defense Minister Ehud Barak said: "His whole life, Shamir was as stable as granite and maintained focus without compromises. He always strived to ensure Israel's freedom. His devotion knew no bounds [and he] always sought what's right for the people of Israel and for the country's security."

Leader of the Opposition and Labor Party head Shelly Yachimovich offered her condolences to Shamir's family saying that

... he was a determined prime minister who dedicated his life to the state. He followed his ideological path honestly and humbly, as a leader should. The citizens of Israel will always remember the wisdom he demonstrated during the First Gulf War. He showed restraint and saved Israel from undue entanglement in the Iraq War. This decision proved to be a brave and wise act of leadership.

His daughter Gilada Diamant said:

[My father] belonged to a different generation of leaders, people with values and beliefs. I hope that we have more people like him in the future. His political doing has undoubtedly left its mark on the State of Israel. Dad was an amazing man, a family man in the fullest sense of the word, a man who dedicated himself to the State of Israel but never forgot his family, not even for a moment. He was a special man.

== Awards and recognition ==
In 2001, Shamir received the Israel Prize, for his lifetime achievements and special contribution to society and the State of Israel.

== Published works ==
He wrote Sikumo shel davar, a book which was published in English by Weidenfeld and Nicolson, London, as Summing Up: An autobiography (1994).

== Overview of offices held ==
Shamir twice served as prime minister (Israel's head of government). His first stint spanned from 10 October 1983 through 13 September 1984, leading the 20th government during the latter portion of the 10th Knesset. His second stint lasted from 20 October 1986 through 13 July 1992, leading the 22nd government during the latter half of the 11th Knesset, and 23rd and 24th governments during the 12th Knesset.

Shamir was a member of the Knesset from after his 1973 election until 1996. During the first portion of the 13th Knesset Shamir served as the Knesset's opposition leader (at the time an unofficial and honorary role) from July 1992 through March 1993.

Shamir became leader of Herut and Likud in 1983, leading Likud until 1993.

=== Ministerial posts ===
Ministerial posts
Ministerial post	Tenure	Prime Minister(s)	Government(s)	Predecessor	Successor
Minister of Foreign Affairs	10 March 1980 – 20 October 1986	Menachem Begin (until 10 October 1983); Yitzhak Shamir (10 October 1983–13 September 1984); Shimon Peres (from 13 September 1984)	18, 19, 20, 21	Moshe Dayan	Shimon Peres
Designated Acting Prime Minister	13 September 1984 – 20 October 1986	Shimon Peres	21	post established	Shimon Peres
Minister of Labour and Social Welfare (first tenure)	22 December 1988 – 7 March 1990	Yitzhak Shamir	23	Moshe Katsav	Roni Milo
Minister of the Environment	11 June 1990 – 13 July 1992	Yitzhak Shamir	24	Rafael Edri	Ora Namir
Minister of Jerusalem Affairs	11 June 1990 – 13 July 1992	Yitzhak Shamir	24	Avner Shaki	Yitzhak Rabin
Minister of Labour and Social Welfare (second tenure)	11 June 1990 – 13 July 1992	Yitzhak Shamir	24	Roni Milo	Yitzhak Rabin

== Electoral history ==
=== Party leadership elections ===
1983 Herut leadership election
Candidate	Votes	%
Yitzhak Shamir	436	59.08
David Levy	302	40.92
Total votes	738	100

1984 Herut leadership election
Candidate	Votes	%
Yitzhak Shamir (incumbent)	407	56.45
Ariel Sharon	306	42.44
Aryeh Chertok	8	1.11
Total votes	721	100

1992 Likud leadership election
Candidate	Votes	%
Yitzhak Shamir (incumbent)		46.4
David Levy		31.2
Ariel Sharon		22.3

== See also ==
- List of Israel Prize recipients
- Not one inch

== Bibliography ==
- Benvenisti, Meron (January–February 1995). "The Last Revisionist Zionist". Foreign Affairs.
- Brinkley, Joel (August 21, 1988). "The stubborn strength of Yitzhak Shamir". The New York Times.
- Golan, Zev (November 1, 2011). Stern: The Man and His Gang. Yair Publications. ISBN 978-965-91724-0-5.
- Heller, Joseph (1995). The Stern Gang: Ideology, Politics and Terror, 1940–1949. London: Frank Cass.
- Morris, Benny (1 October 2008). 1948: A History of the First Arab-Israeli War. Yale University Press. ISBN 978-0-300-14524-3.
- Morris, Benny (2005). "The Historiography of Deir Yassin". Journal of Israeli History. 24 (1). Informa UK Limited: 79–107. doi:10.1080/13531040500040305. ISSN 1353-1042. S2CID 159894369.
- Morris, Benny (2004). The Birth of the Palestinian Refugee Problem Revisited. Cambridge University Press.
- Morris, Benny (2001). Righteous Victims: A History of the Zionist-Arab Conflict, 1881–2001. Vintage Books.
- Morris, Benny (1987). The Birth of the Palestinian Refugee Problem, 1947–1949. Cambridge University Press. ISBN 9780521330282.
- Nowak-Jezioranski, Jan (January 26, 2001). "A Need for Compensation". Rzeczpospolita. Archived from the original on July 17, 2012.
- Peres, Shimon (1995). Battling for Peace. New York: Random House. ISBN 9780679436171.
- Shamir, Yitzhak (1994). Summing Up. London: Little, Brown. ISBN 9780316968256.
- Shindler, Colin (1995). Israel, Likud and the Zionist Dream: Power, Politics, and the Zionist dream from Begin to Netanyahu. London: I.B. Tauris.
- Shindler, Colin (2002). The Land Beyond Promise: Israel, Likud and the Zionist Dream. London: I.B. Tauris.
- West, Benjamin (1959). Struggles of a Generation: the Jews under Soviet Rule. Tel Aviv: Massadah.

Political offices
Preceded by Yisrael Yeshayahu	Speaker of the Knesset; 1977–1980	Succeeded by Yitzhak Berman
Preceded by Moshe Dayan	Minister of Foreign Affairs; 1980–1986	Succeeded by Shimon Peres
Preceded by Menachem Begin	Prime Minister of Israel; 1983–1984	Succeeded by Shimon Peres
Preceded by Shimon Peres	Prime Minister of Israel; 1986–1992	Succeeded by Yitzhak Rabin
Party political offices
Preceded by Menachem Begin	Leader of Herut; 1983–1988	Succeeded by Unified Likud party
Preceded by New Party	Leader of the Likud Party; 1988–1993	Succeeded by Benjamin Netanyahu
