= Gesher (1996 political party) =

Former political party in Israel

Gesher גֶּשֶׁר
- Leader: David Levy
- Founded: 11 March 1996
- Dissolved: 2007
- Split from: Likud
- Merged into: Likud
- Ideology: Zionism; Liberal conservatism; Mizrahi interests
- Political position: Center-right
- Alliances: One Israel (1999–2001)
- Most MKs: 5 (1996–1999)
- Fewest MKs: 2 (1996, 2003)

Gesher (Hebrew: גֶּשֶׁר, lit. 'Bridge'), officially the Gesher National Social Movement (Hebrew: גשר – תנועה חברתית לאומית, Gesher – Teno'a Hevratit Le'umit), was a political party in Israel between 1996 and 2003. It formed when David Levy led a split from the Israeli center-right party Likud. Gesher helped to form coalition governments led by both Likud and the left-wing Labor Party, but never gained significant power. The party was eventually disbanded as Levy returned to Likud. In 2019, David Levy's daughter, Orly Levy set up a similar party named Gesher, which advocates for many of the same policies supported by her father.

== History ==
=== Foundation ===
Gesher was founded by David Levy on 11 March 1996 as a breakaway from the Likud party during the thirteenth Knesset, after Levy lost the Likud leadership election to Benjamin Netanyahu.

Levy refused to accept Netanyahu as the new Likud chairman. Netanyahu's management tactics angered many Likud supporters while his right-wing rhetoric gained the confidence of Ariel Sharon, Benny Begin, and other hard-line party members. Levy knew that if he were cowed by his opponent, his supporters would either join Netanyahu's camp in order to oppose the new Oslo Accords, or support a more socialist candidate. He also knew that Netanyahu would not be willing to give him one of the top four ministries should Likud return to power after Levy's disastrous term as foreign minister.

Levy believed he could cause a mass defection of Members of Knesset (MKs) from Likud in hopes that leading senior members in Likud's Central Committee would panic, effectively toppling Netanyahu. However, only David Magen broke with Likud. Though many of Gesher's members were described as the "lackeys" of David Levy by the press, Magen proved to be rather independent and later broke with Levy to join the Centre Party (then known as Israel in the Centre) in 1998.

=== Alliance with Likud ===
Gesher never reached the potential which Levy had predicted. Disadvantages for the populist party included the constant press attention to the Oslo Accords, terrorist attacks, rumors of negotiations surrounding the future of the Golan Heights, and the low priority that the media gave to economic and labor issues. Meanwhile, Netanyahu's campaign to topple Yitzhak Rabin helped revitalize Likud and bring in new members. Levy was forced to oppose Netanyahu's hard-line rhetoric, thereby appearing to be an ally of Rabin, though he continued to advocate his own proposals. Joining Rabin's Israeli Labor Party openly, even in coalition, was at that time still unacceptable to many Moroccans and other Mizrahim, who were resentful of Labor's predecessor, Mapai.

In the winter of 1995, Levy was beginning to break under the stress of his first election campaign outside Likud. Netanyahu had been frantically trying to moderate his image following the assassination of Rabin by a right-wing radical on 5 November 1995. Allying with Gesher would bring him closer to that goal without forcing him to take a clear stand in favor of the Oslo Accords. Netanyahu was also trying to recruit the hard-line Tzomet (Junction) party of Rafael Eitan on the right, as well as the moderate right-wing Yitzhak Mordechai in the center.

Throughout the spring, Netanyahu and Levy held negotiations, resulting in the Likud-Gesher-Tzomet, a three-party broad-based coalition which was strong enough to challenge the Labor Party in the May 1996 elections. Though the elections were a massive success for Netanyahu, they gained very little for Gesher. Mordechai became the second-most powerful person in Likud, and the right-wing character of the government was clear from the start. Levy demanded and received the Foreign Ministry, but was overshadowed by Netanyahu, who controlled almost every important foreign policy decision during his term. David Magen was given the post of Deputy Minister of Finance, under Yuval Ne'eman.

Netanyahu's term as prime minister became a stormy period for Levy and other coalition partners. The Bar-On Affair, an attempt to alter the investigation of Shas leader Aryeh Deri, created tension within the partners, as did Netanyahu's unclear policies on peace negotiations. The economic policies of Ne'eman hurt Likud's image with the working class, because unemployment increased while economic growth shrank, despite a fall in terror attacks and the adoption of a deregulation agenda.

=== Breakaway and independence ===
On 6 January 1998, Levy quit the coalition along with his brother Maxim Levy and Yehuda Lancry. Gesher and David Levy drifted closer to the policies of the Labor Party and opposition leader Ehud Barak. Lack of progress on the peace front had weakened Likud, with some members reforming the right-wing Herut while others formed Israel in the Centre to compete with Gesher for moderate voters.

=== Alliance with Labor ===
In 1999, a motion of no-confidence vote in the Knesset forced Netanyahu to call early elections for May. Levy had not yet been able to redevelop Gesher's street appeal and was left with four options:

- Ally with Netanyahu, gaining more influence in a smaller coalition while positioning himself as a candidate in a post-election primary if Netanyahu lost.
- Ally with Barak in the Labor Party, in return for a ministerial position.
- Ally with Mordechai, whose centrist platform was similar to Levy's, and draw votes away from the larger parties.
- Run independently, attempting to win enough seats to have influence over a minority government, whichever side should win.

Levy chose to ally with Labor, because pre-election polls had shown a deep slide in Netanyahu's support. Likud had fallen from 32 seats to only 20 with the defections of Mordechai, Levy, Begin and their supporters. Gesher, Labor and Meimad formed the coalition One Israel, with Levy a partner in its leadership. This angered many former supporters who viewed this as the ultimate treason, either to his Mizrahi followers or Likud.

One Israel won the elections with only 26 seats, a record low for a governing party. Though Barak won 56% of the direct vote for prime minister. Netanyahu's Likud was crushed, winning only 19 seats and leading to his resignation from the Knesset.

Levy became foreign minister, but Barak continued Netanyahu's policy of managing the Foreign Ministry, with Levy no more than a passive partner.

=== Second breakaway ===
Gesher quit the coalition in April 2000, both in response to Barak's desperate attempts to move peace negotiations forward, and in protest to the announced plan to withdraw Israeli military forces from Lebanon.

Levy was the first minister in Barak's government to resign. He reformed Gesher along with Maxim Levy and Mordechai Mishani. Like Netanyahu, Barak failed to hold his coalition government together; the leftist Meretz party departed at the end of June that year, the National Religious Party (NRP), Shas, and Yisrael BaAliyah only two weeks later. Barak's popularity plummeted following the outbreak of the Second Intifada in September 2000, and in November he resigned which forced a direct-vote election for prime minister, in a ballot between Barak and opposition leader Ariel Sharon of Likud.

=== Sharon administration ===
The Prime Ministerial election in February 2001 was a landslide victory for Sharon, whose new government did not include Gesher. In February 2002, One Nation quit the coalition and the National Union–Yisrael Beiteinu quit in March. This allowed Gesher to enter the coalition in April, with Levy named minister without portfolio. One Israel quit in November to force elections for January 2003.

=== Dissolution ===
With the abandonment of the direct vote for prime minister, Likud gained support while sectarian parties were falling apart. Levy stood to gain nothing running with Gesher, and left the party to rejoin Likud, an act that raised controversy among Gesher members. Estee Shiraz, the party's communications director at that time, was elected as the leader of Gesher in the elections to the 16th Knesset. Levy and his supporters objected in a surprising lawsuit to the Tel Aviv District Court to prevent Shiraz from continuing the party's activity, and asked the court to dissolve the party and treat his move as a merge of his political party in its entirety. During the years-long litigation on the matter, Shiraz and other members of the party tried to rebuild Gesher as a modern party focused on social policy that would appeal to Israel's younger generation of academics and professionals.

David Levy was elected as a member of the 16th Knesset but did not gain a place on the Likud list in the election to the 17th Knesset and subsequently retired from politics. Shiraz moved to the US in 2003, while the rest of the party's members had continued the litigation. In 2007, the Supreme Court of Israel upheld the decision to dismantle Gesher and the party ceased to exist.

== Election results ==
Election	Leader	Votes	%	Seats	+/–	Status
1996	David Levy	With Likud and Tzomet		5 / 120	New	Coalition
1999	David Levy	Part of One Israel		2 / 120	▼3	Coalition (1999-2000)
1999	David Levy	Part of One Israel		2 / 120	▼3	Opposition (2000-2001)
1999	David Levy	Part of One Israel		2 / 120	▼3	Coalition (2001-2003)
2003	Estee Shiraz	Did not contest				Extra-parliamentary
