= 1984 Herut leadership election =

- 12 April 1984
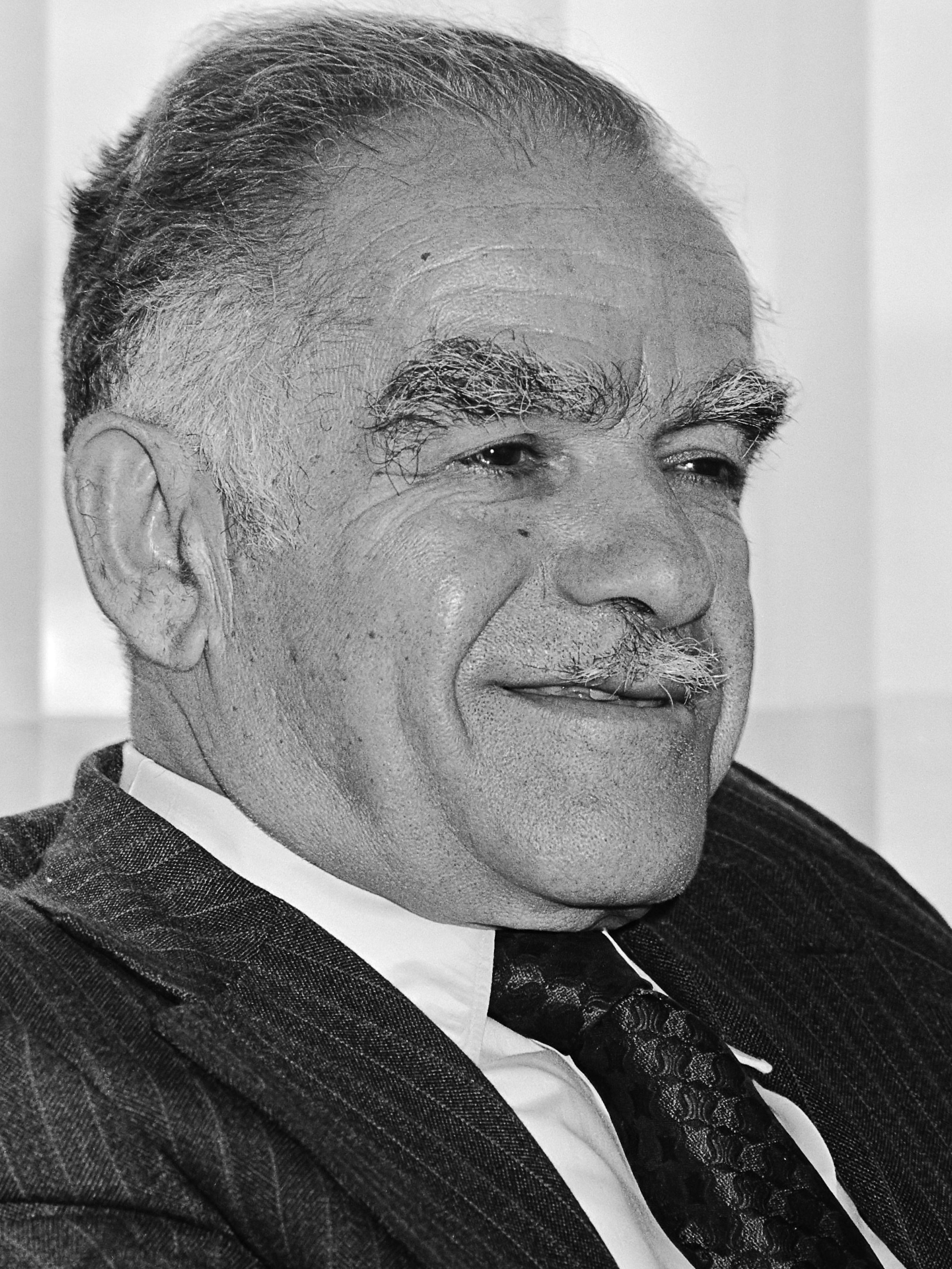

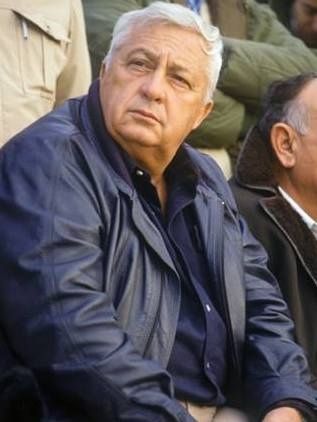
| Candidate | Yitzhak Shamir | Ariel Sharon |
| Popular vote | 407 | 306 |
| Percentage | 56.45% | 42.44% |
Leader before election
Yitzhak Shamir
Elected Leader
Yitzhak Shamir

The 1984 Herut leadership election was held on 12 April 1984 to elect the leader of the Herut party. It saw the members of Herut's Central Committee reelect Yitzhak Shamir (the incumbent leader and incumbent prime minister), who defeated a challenge from former defense minister Ariel Sharon as well as lawyer Aryeh Chertok.

Herut was the main party of the Likud coalition, making its leader also the leader of that coalition. Party leaders in Israel are typically the party's candidate to be prime minister in Knesset elections. The election was held in advanced of the July 23, 1984 Knesset election.

== Candidates ==
- Aryeh Chertok, lawyer
- Yitzhak Shamir, incumbent leader and incumbent prime minister
- Ariel Sharon, member of the Knesset, minister without portfolio, former minister of Defense, former minister of agriculture

== Campaign ==
Sharon announced his candidacy on 9 February 1984, in a speech to students at Bar-Ilan University. Sharon was regarded to be a very controversial figure in Israeli's politics. Before this challenge to Shamir, Sharon had been sidelined in politics for roughly a year, after having been made to resign as defense minister in February 1983 following a government judicial commission inquiry which found him derelict in duty, faulting him for having not managed to prevent the Sabra and Shatila massacre. Sharon's leadership challenge was an effort at a political comeback, aiming to at least receive his position of minister of defense (which was regarded by many the second most-important position in Israeli government, behind prime minister). At the time, Sharon was regarded as a hardliner on issues related to Arabs, both domestically and foreign. During his leadership campaign, Sharon portrayed himself as an underdog hoping to rehabilitate his reputation from what he portrayed to be an unfair degradation. During his campaign, he traveled across the nation to local Herut chapters. He claimed the government inquiry that had led to his ouster as defense minister was unfair, decrying it as, "a mark of Cain on my forehead." Sharon, despite being disgraced by judicial commission inquiry, retained a dedicated base of support among right-wing nationalists.

== Election procedure ==
The electorate for the leadership election were the 3,000 members of Herut's Central Committee. A week before the vote, the party moved to change the required threshold to avoid a runoff election to 40% from the previous 50%.

== Result ==
Shamir was reelected. However, Sharon's performance was considered strong, with Shamir's reelection being regarded as relatively narrow. The vote was seen as boosting Sharon's political comeback, and indicating a potential divide within the party.

1984 Herut leadership election
| Candidate | Votes | % |
|---|---|---|
| Yitzhak Shamir (incumbent) | 407 | 56.45 |
| Ariel Sharon | 306 | 42.44 |
| Aryeh Chertok | 8 | 1.11 |
| Total votes | 721 | 100 |

== Aftermath ==
After the leadership election, Sharon continued to stage his political comeback. On May 9, the conference of party leaders which selected Herut's electoral list for the upcoming election placed Sharon in the fourth position on the list. He had made an active effort to campaign for the second position on the list (the party leader automatically would be given the first position), which instead went to David Levy. Nonetheless, fourth place was regarded as a high placement, and was seen as positioning him for a ministerial post should the party be successful in the election.

Sharon's comeback frustrated the Israeli Liberal Party, a partner of Herut's in the Likud coalition, who felt his return to prominence saddled the coalition with an extremist image.
