= David Levy (Israeli politician) =

Israeli politician (1937–2024)

- דוד לוי
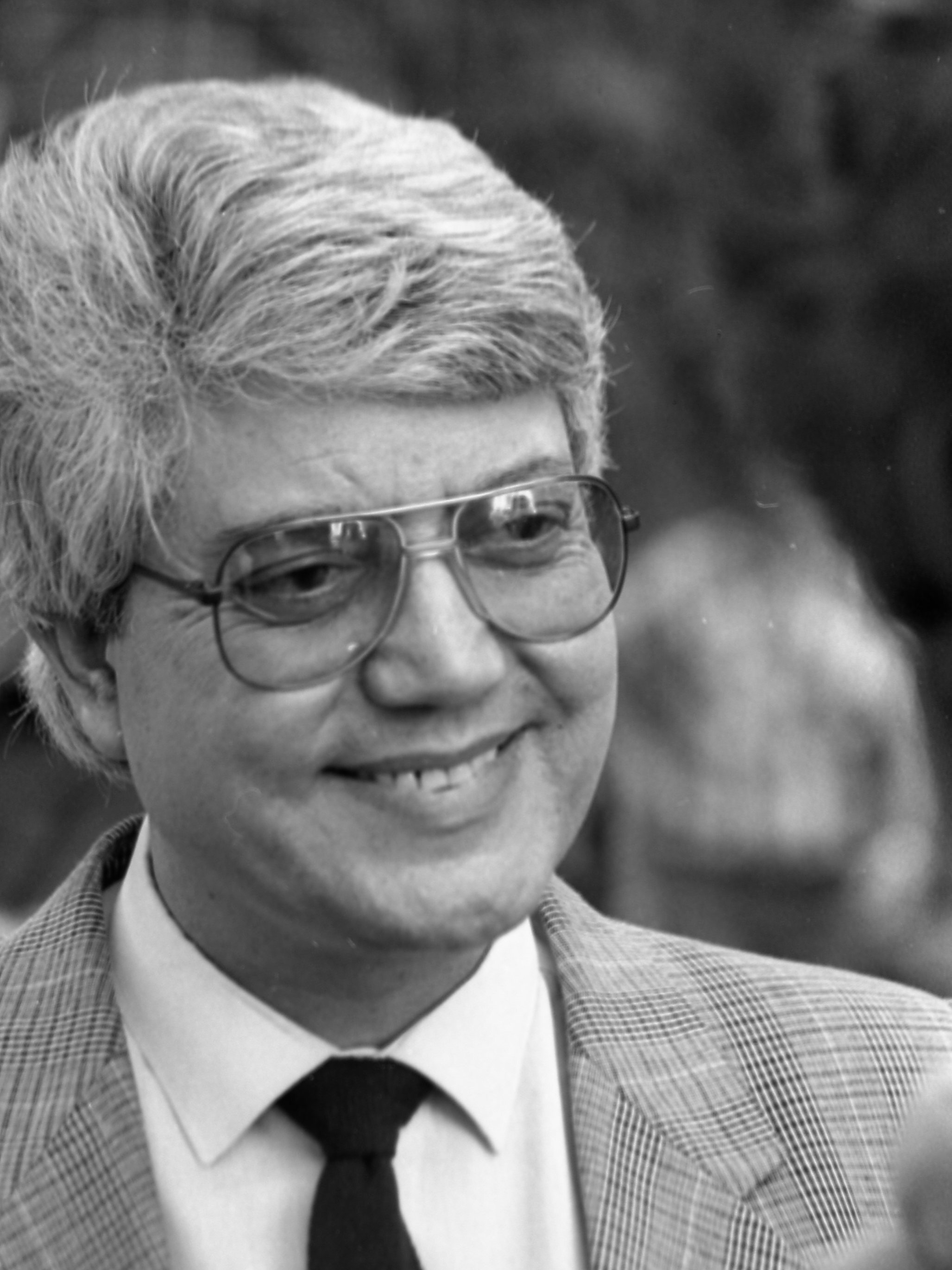
- Levy in 1984

Ministerial roles
- 1977–1981: Minister of Immigrant Absorption
- 1979–1990: Minister of Housing and Construction
- 1981–1992: Deputy Prime Minister
- 1990–1992: Minister of Foreign Affairs
- 1996–1998: Deputy Prime Minister
- 1996–1998: Minister of Foreign Affairs
- 1999–2000: Deputy Prime Minister
- 1999–2000: Minister of Foreign Affairs
- 2002: Minister without Portfolio

Faction represented in the Knesset
- 1969–1974: Gahal
- 1974–1996: Likud
- 1996–1999: Gesher
- 1999–2001: One Israel
- 2001–2003: Gesher
- 2003–2006: Likud

Personal details
- Born: 21 December 1937 Rabat, French Morocco
- Died: 2 June 2024 (aged 86) Beit She'an, Israel
- Children: 12
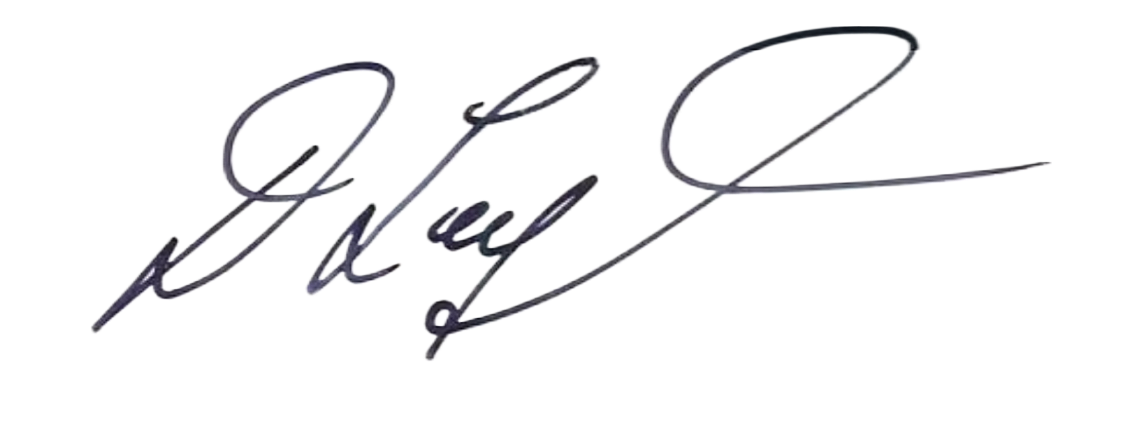
- Signature

David Levy (Hebrew: דוד לוי; 21 December 1937 – 2 June 2024) was an Israeli politician who served as a member of the Knesset between 1969 and 2006. Levy's ascent to political prominence demonstrated the growing influence of Mizrahi Jews in Israel. He played a crucial role in changing the political power structure in Israel by motivating hundreds of thousands of Mizrahi voters to cast their ballots for Menachem Begin. To quote Benjamin Netanyahu, "David, born in Morocco, forged his way through life with his own two hands... On the national level, he made a personal mark on the political world, while taking care of weak populations that knew adversity."

He served Israel as Deputy Prime Minister, Minister of Foreign Affairs, Minister of Immigrant Absorption, Minister of Housing and Construction, and as a Minister without Portfolio. Although most of his time as a Knesset member was spent with Likud, he also led the breakaway Gesher faction, which formed part of Ehud Barak's Labor-led government between 1999 and 2001.

== Biography ==
David Levy was born in Rabat, Morocco. Levy was student at the Alliance school and at a Talmud Torah (religious junior school) in Morocco.

He immigrated to Israel in 1957. His first jobs in Israel were planting trees for the Jewish National Fund and picking cotton on a kibbutz, where he organized a strike to protest the quality of drinking water for the workers. He went on to become a leader of Beit She'an's working-class population. As a union activist, he campaigned for membership in the Histadrut Labour Federation's executive body, which was dominated by loyalists of the governing Mapai. Levy headed the opposition Blue-White faction.

David Levy was married and the father of twelve children, including Orly Levy and Jackie Levy. He died on 2 June 2024, at the age of 86.

== Political career ==
Until 1973 Likud had been an alliance of the right-wing Herut and centrist Liberal parties known as Gahal, which had never had an active role in governing Israel and had always been a weak opposition. Levy distinguished himself as the first of many young working-class members of the party from a Mizrahi background. Until then Herut and the Liberals had been both dominated by right-wing upper-class or upper-middle-class intellectuals, businessmen, agriculturalists, or lawyers.

Levy's rise expressed the surging power of the new rebellion of the Mizrahi Israeli. In 1977, Levy became one of the most strident campaigners in Likud leader Menachem Begin's triumphant campaign that overturned the 30-year domination of Israeli elections by parties of the left. He drove hundreds of thousands of Mizrahi voters to the polls to vote for Begin, whose populist messages struck a chord in their hearts after the three decades of almost completely Ashkenazic Mapai hegemony.

== Ministerial positions ==
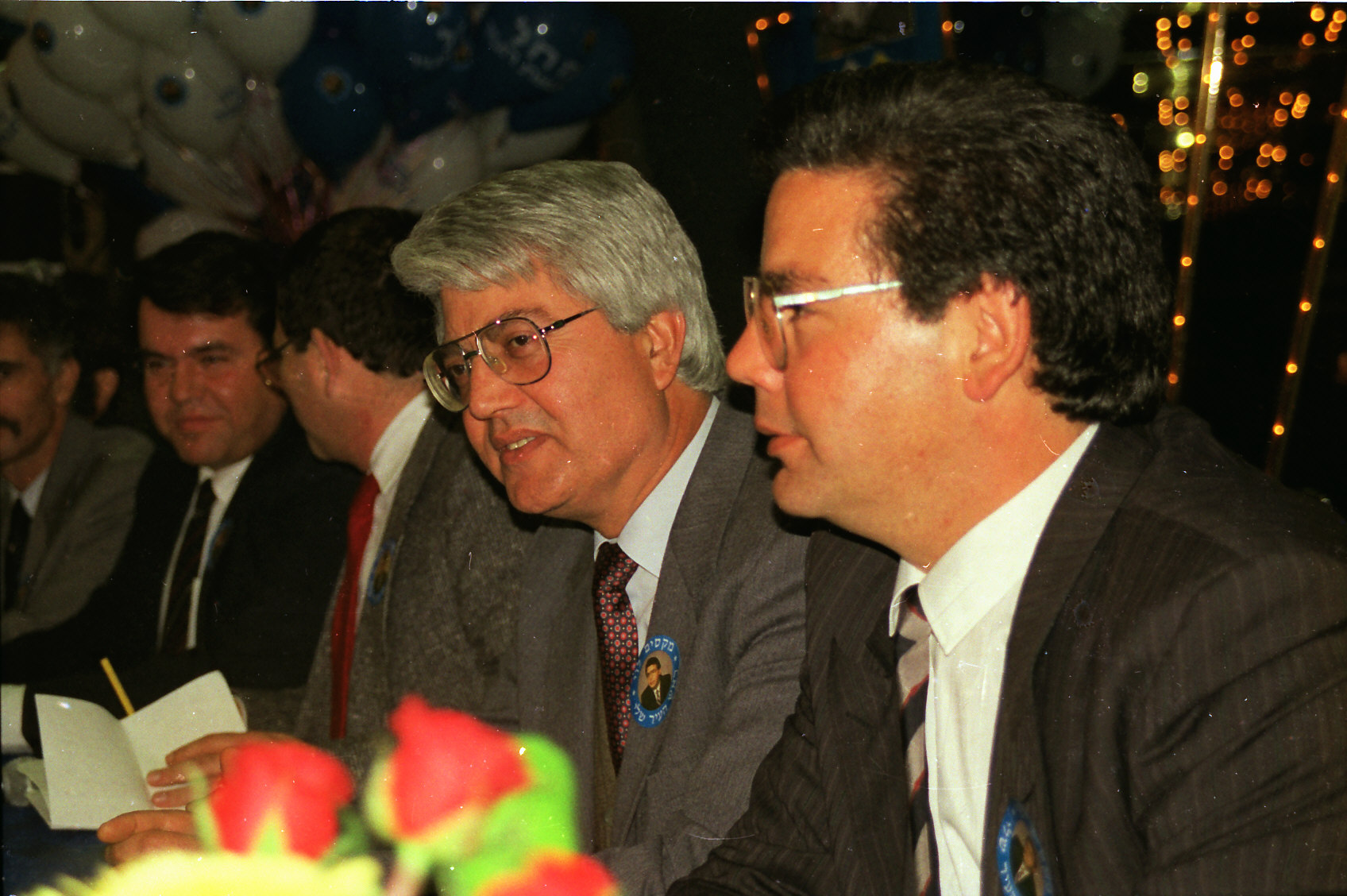
Levy with brother Maxim Levy, c. 1988

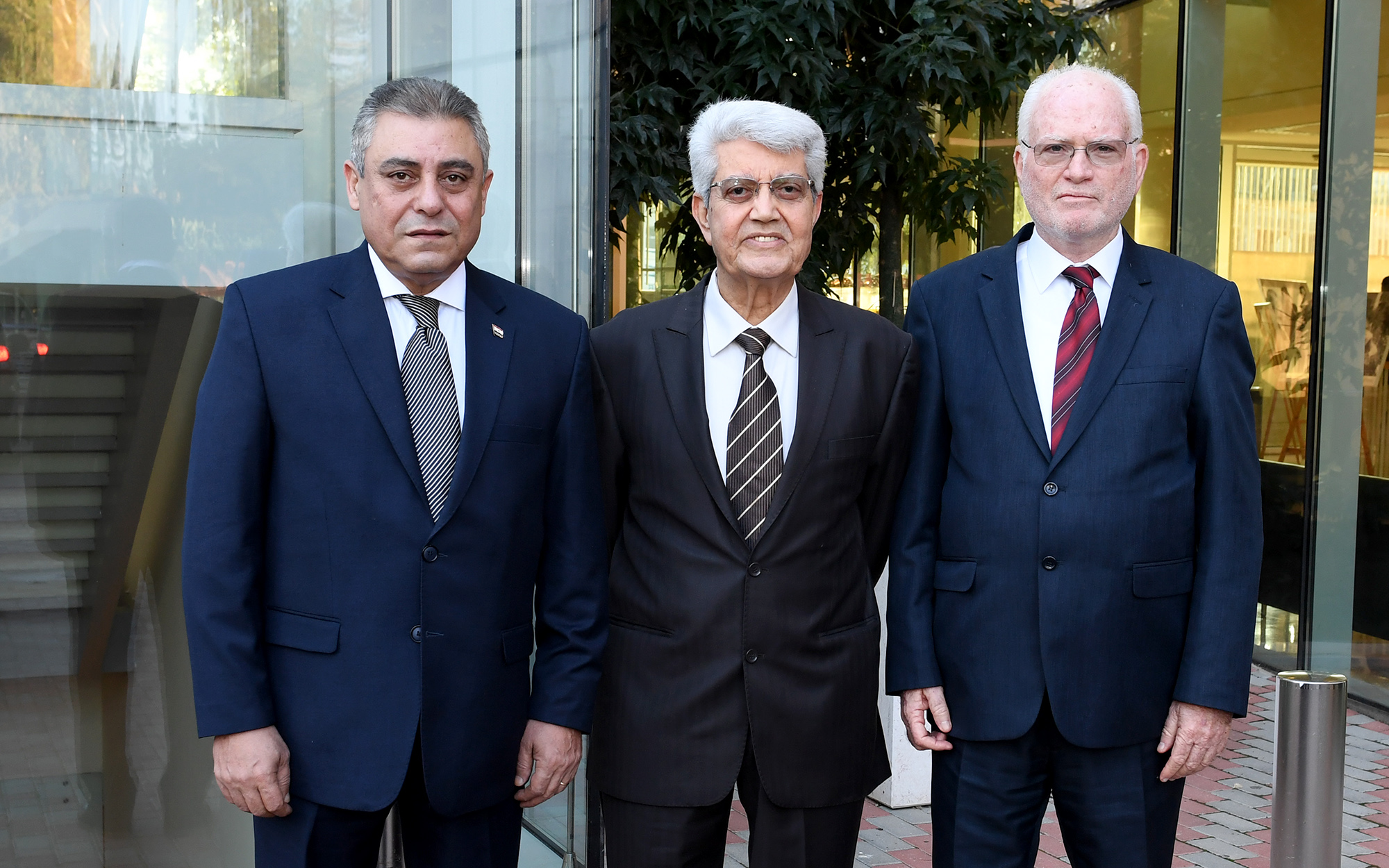
Levy at Sadat Legacy Conference, 2017

=== Minister of Immigrant Absorption ===
From 1977 until 1981, Levy was Minister of Immigrant Absorption in the first two Begin governments. At this time the largest issues he dealt with during his tenure in that ministry were the campaign to liberate Soviet Jews confined to the USSR, and the controversy over the Beta Israel, a group from Ethiopia that had still not received total recognition as Jews at that time.

=== Minister of Housing and Construction ===
On 15 January 1979 he was given the Ministry of Housing and Construction, a post he invested a great deal of time in. Levy held the ministry until 1990.

As Housing Minister Levy was able to make housing more affordable (radical inflation in 1984 produced a crisis as property and rent values plummeted along with the Israeli shekels). While rival Likud members like Defense Minister Ariel Sharon and Health Minister Ehud Olmert were hit by controversies regarding abuse of their positions, and repeated finance ministers fell, Levy remained stable in the Housing Ministry. He served in this position in the governments of Begin, Yitzhak Shamir, and Shimon Peres.

Levy was the symbolic leader of the young Mizrahi Likud leaders that included former Kiryat Malakhi mayor Moshe Katzav, later President of Israel, and David Magen, mayor of neighbouring Kiryat Gat. In the Likud Central Committee, Levy commanded a huge portion of the members, and was considered a true candidate to succeed Shamir.

In 1987, he met Benjamin Netanyahu, then the Israeli ambassador to the United Nations. Levy viewed Netanyahu as a potential spokesman for him in the Knesset, as he was viewed as a master at rhetoric and debating during his career as a diplomat.

Netanyahu turned down Levy's offer and became an ally of then-Defense Minister Moshe Arens (his former boss when Arens was Ambassador to the United States in the early 1980s). Levy was criticized for his perceived pompousness and shifting policies on the peace process. Levy, who speaks Hebrew, French, and Moroccan Arabic, was not fluent in English, which became an impediment in talks with the Americans. Levy's candidacy was supposed to rejuvenate the Likud's Mizrahi voting base and form a hawkish working class opposition to Labour. Levy's policies on the peace question was moderate relative to Ariel Sharon, Moshe Arens, and almost all other senior Likud figures.

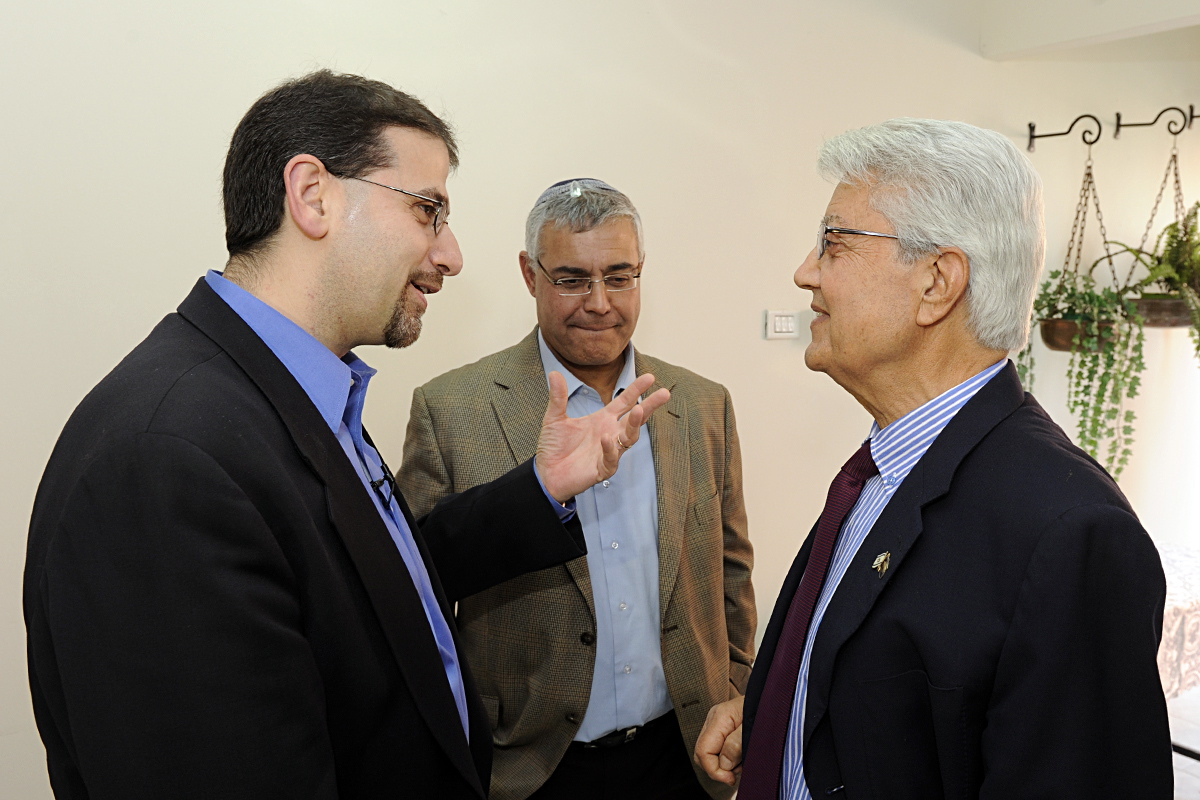
Meeting with U.S. Ambassador Dan Shapiro in Beit She'an, 2011

Again he ran parallel to Benjamin Netanyahu who took a hard-line stand, describing a doomsday scenario of terror at the doorstep of every Israeli. Levy refused to accept Netanyahu as the new Likud chairman. The result was the establishment of Gesher ("Bridge"), Levy's own political party. Levy believed he could draw a mass defection from the Likud of parliament members and topple Benjamin Netanyahu. What occurred was that only David Magen, a Moroccan politician and former mayor of Kiryat Gat who served as Minister of Economics and Planning in the last Shamir government, broke with the Likud. Magen later broke with Levy to join the Center Party in 1998 (then known as "Israel in the Center").

Netanyahu and Levy agreed to establish Likud–Gesher–Tzomet, a joint three-party list for the May 1996 elections.

=== Foreign minister ===
Levy first served as Foreign Minister in 1990, under Yitzhak Shamir. Under Ehud Barak, Levy was again appointed foreign minister, with his deputy being Nawaf Mazalha (One Israel), an Arab Israeli. He quit the coalition in August 2000 in response to Barak's plan to withdraw Israeli military forces from Lebanon.

Levy was the first minister in Barak's government to resign when his demands were not met. He reformed Gesher along with Maxim Levy and rookie legislator Mordechai Mishani. In February 2002 One Nation quit Sharon's government to protest his economic policies. Their leader, Histadrut Labour Federation chairman Amir Peretz. Levy's position for the elections for the 16th Knesset was precarious. Levy left Gesher and moved back to the Likud. Etty (Estee) Shiraz, the party's head of communications at that time, was elected as the head of Gesher instead of David Levy, and led Gesher in the elections to the 16th Knesset. Levy and his supporters objected in the petition to prevent Shiraz and the rest of Gesher members from continuing the party's activity, and asked to dissolve the party and relate to his move as a merge of his political party in its entirety. The struggle continued years later, while Shiraz and other members of the party are trying to rebuild Gesher and transform it into a modern social party appealing to Israel's young generation of academics and professionals, and David Levy and his supporters seeking to dismantle it.

Levy was elected as a member of the 16th Knesset but did not get a realistic place on the Likud list in the election to the 17th Knesset and disappeared from the political arena. Following the Kadima split, Levy failed to acquire a high position on Likud's Knesset list, and as a result of this lost his seat at the 2006 election.

== Awards and recognition ==
In 2018, Levy won the Israel Prize for lifetime achievement.

== See also ==
- 1983 Herut leadership election
- 1992 Likud leadership election
- 1993 Likud leadership election
