= 1983 Herut leadership election =

- 2 September 1983
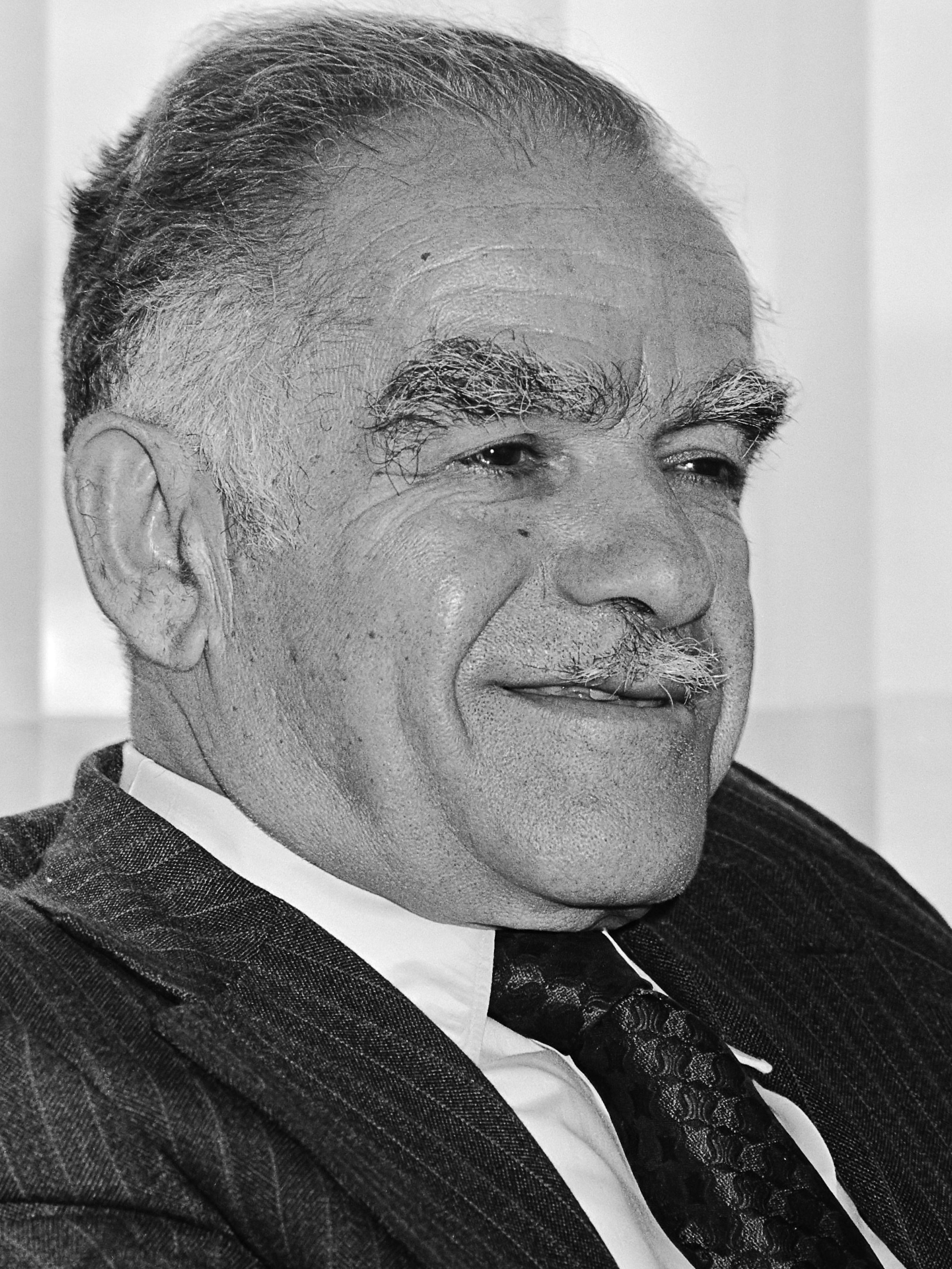

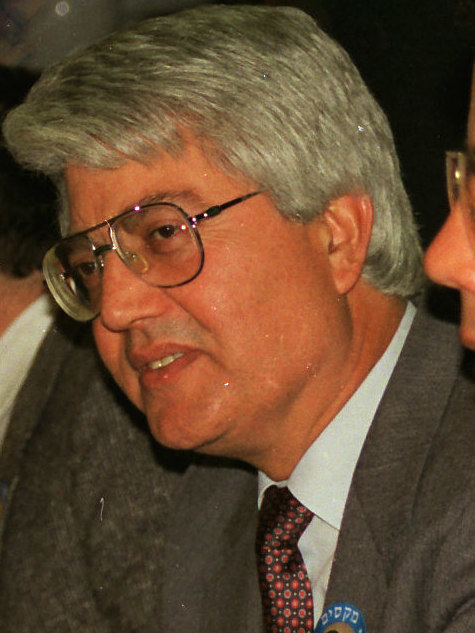
Candidate	Yitzhak Shamir	David Levy
Popular vote	436	302
Percentage	59.08%	40.92%
Leader before election
Menachem Begin
Elected Leader
Yitzhak Shamir

The 1983 Herut leadership election was held on 2 September 1983 to elect the leader of the Herut party. It saw the election of Yitzhak Shamir to succeed Menachem Begin. The electorate for the vote was limited to members of the party's central committee.

== Background ==
The election came after the resignation of incumbent Herut party leader and prime minister Menachem Begin, announced on 28 August 1983. This was Herut's first leadership election.

== Candidates ==
- Yitzhak Shamir, member of the Knesset, Foreign Minister, and former speaker of the Knesset
- David Levy, member of the Knesset, deputy prime minister

Withdrew

- Ariel Sharon (endorsed Shamir)

== Campaign ==
There were only five days between Begin's announcement of resignation and the leadership vote. While some wanted to see a quick transition in which Shamir would have been ratified as leader without any opponents, Shamir had been unable to persuade Levy to drop out of the race.

Shamir was largely favored by the party's old guard and cabinet ministers, but Levy did have a large base of support among the rank-and-file membership of the party.

== Election procedure ==
The election was a secret ballot vote of Herut's 900 member Central Committee. The vote took place in Tel Aviv's Ohel Shem theater.

== Result ==
1983 Herut leadership election
Candidate	Votes	%
Yitzhak Shamir	436	59.08
David Levy	302	40.92
Total votes	738	100

== Subsequent negotiations to have Shamir lead the Likud coalition ==
The day after the Herut leadership elections, rapid negotiations were led with the leaders of the other member party's of the Likud coalition (which Likud was the principle party of), and these leaders announced that they agreed to have Shamir lead the coalition.
