= Liberalism in Israel =

Liberalism has played a role in Israel since the country's founding. Several liberal political parties have claimed substantial popular support, mainly proved by having representation in the Knesset. While liberalism is usually suspicious of nationalism, Jewish liberals in Israel generally support some form of Zionism. They tend to be more receptive towards a Two-state solution.

Conservative liberals (see General Zionists, Liberal Party) were founding members of the Likud, the country's main conservative party, while social liberals (see Progressive Party, Independent Liberals) were integrated in the social-democratic Labor Party. Later on, a long-time liberal, anti-clerical and pro-free market party was Shinui, a member of the Liberal International (LI).

More recently, Kadima was a broad liberal and centrist party, integrating politicians from the left and the right. Current liberal (and liberal Zionist) parties are Yesh Atid (LI member), Blue and White and Yashar. New Hope, now in alliance with Likud, is a national-liberal party. The Democrats, heir of the social-democratic and socialist traditions of Labor Zionist parties (Mapai, Ahdut HaAvoda, Labor Party, Mapam, Ratz and Meretz).

== Overview ==
School	Party
Progressivism	Israeli Labor Party (1968–2024)
Progressivism	Ratz (1973–1997)
Progressivism	Meretz (1997–2024)
Progressivism	The Democrats (2024–present)
Green liberalism	Ale Yarok (1999–present)
Social liberalism	Progressive Party (1948–1961)
Social liberalism	Independent Liberals (1965–1992)
Social liberalism	Kulanu (2014–2019)
Social liberalism	Gesher (2019–2021)
Liberalism	Shinui (1974–present)
Liberalism	Democratic Movement for Change (1976–1978)
Liberalism	Hetz (2006–2012)
Liberalism	Kadima (2006–2015)
Liberalism	Hatnua (2012–2019)
Liberalism	Yesh Atid (2012–present)
Liberalism	Blue and White (2018–present)
Liberalism	Yashar (2025–present)
Conservative liberalism	General Zionists (1922–1961)
Conservative liberalism	Israeli Liberal Party (1961–1988)
National liberalism	Likud (1973–present)
National liberalism	Telem (2019–present)
National liberalism	New Hope (2020–present)
Right-libertarianism	Zehut (2015–present)

== Timeline ==
=== From General Zionists to Liberal Party ===
- 1922: Centrists in the World Zionist Organization form the General Zionists.
- 1931: The General Zionists split in "Faction A" and "Faction B".
- 1945: Factions A and B of the General Zionists merge.
- 1951: The party wins 16.2% of the vote and 20 seats in the general election.
- 1961: The party merges with the Progressive Party (PP) to become the Israeli Liberal Party (LP), which wins 13.6% of the vote and 17 seats in the general election.
- 1965: The LP splits with the conservative majority joining Herut to form Gahal, eventually becoming Likud, and the leftist faction forming the Independent Liberals.
- 1988: The LP and Herut formally merge transforming Likud from an electoral coalition to a unitary political party.

=== From Progressive Party to Independent Liberals ===
- 1948: The Progressive Party (PP) is formed.
- 1961: The PP merges with the General Zionists to become the Liberal Party (LP).
- 1965: The Independent Liberals are founded by splinters from the LP.
- 1984: The party joins the Alignment electoral list.
- 1991: The party is formally merged into the Labor Party.

=== Liberal-centrist parties, from Shinui to Yashar ===
- 1973: Amnon Rubinstein forms Shinui.
- 1976: Shinui merges with other minor liberal parties to become the Democratic Movement for Change (Dash).
- 1977: Dash wins 11.6% of the vote and 15 seats in the general election.
- 1978: Dash splits into the Democratic Movement and the Movement for Change and Initiative.
- 1981: The Movement for Change and Initiative renames itself Shinui.
- 1988: Shinui is renamed Shinui–Center Party.
- 1992: The party merges with Mapam and Ratz to form Meretz, a social-democratic party.
- 1998: Avraham Poraz leads a split from Meretz and recreates Shinui as an independent party.
- 1999: Tommy Lapid is invited by Poraz to head Shinui.
- 2003: The party wins 12.3% of the vote and 15 seats in the general election.
- 2006: Lapid leaves Shinui and Poraz forms Hetz.
- 2006: Both Shinui and Hetz fail to win any seats in the general election.
- 2012: Poraz allows Tzipi Livni to use the Hetz's infrastructure to base her new party, Hatnua.
- 2012: Yair Lapid, Tommy's son, launches Yesh Atid.
- 2013: In the general election Yesh Atid wins 14.3% and 19 seats.
- 2015: In the general election Yesh Atid is reduced to 8.8% of the vote and 11 seats.
- 2018: Benny Gantz launches the Hosen, a broad centrist party whose economic goals are liberal. Orly Levy, a splinter from Yisrael Beiteinu, forms Gesher.
- 2019: In the run-up of the April general election Yesh Atid, Hosen and the newly-formed Telem, led by former Likud minister Moshe Ya'alon, join forces into Blue and White. The list wins 26.1% and 35 seats, while Gesher 1.7% and no seats. In the September general election the Blue and White list comes first with 26.1% and 33 seats, while Gesher obtains one seat for its leader Levy in alliance with the Labor Party.
- 2020: In the general election Blue and White increases its tallies to 26.6% and 33 seats, but comes second after Likud. After the election, Blue and White splits over the formation of a national-unity government along with Likud: Hosen, which retains the "Blue and White" name, on one side, Yesh Atid and Telem on the other. In the event, a minority faction of Telem splits and forms Derekh Eretz, supporting the national-unity government along with Hosen. In December Derekh Eretz joins New Hope. Also in December Ofer Shelah, a splinter from Yesh Atid, announces his intent of forming a new political party named Tnufa, while, on the left, Tel Aviv mayor Ron Huldai leaves the Labor Party to launch The Israelis, which was joined also by leading splinters from Hosen / Blue and White.
- 2021: In the run-up of the general election Yesh Atid and Telem part ways, and the latter finally drops out. In the election Yesh Atid wins 13.9% and 17 seats, Blue and White 6.6% and 8 seats, New Hope 4.7% and 6 seats. All three parties go on to be part of the 36th government of Israel, with Yesh Atid being the largest faction.
- 2022: In the general election Yesh Atid gets its largest share of the vote so far, 17.8% with 24 seats, becoming the largest opposition party, while National Unity, centred around Blue and White, wins 9.1% and 12 seats.
- 2025: Gadi Eisenkot parts ways from Blue And White, and forms Yashar.
- 2026: In the run-up of the general election Yesh Atid teams up with right-wing Bennett 2026 to form Together.

=== Splits from and mergers into Likud ===
- 2005: Ariel Sharon, Prime Minister and leader of the Likud, leaves the party and forms Kadima largely to support the unilateral disengagement plan from the Gaza Strip and is soon joined by like-minded politicians from the Labor Party, notably including Shimon Peres, and other parties.
- 2006: Sharon suffers a massive stroke, but Kadima, led by Ehud Olmert, wins the general election with 22.0% of the vote and 29 seats. Olmert is Prime Minister.
- 2009: Kadima, led by Tzipi Livni, comes first the general election with 22.5% of the vote and 28 seats, but Livni fails to form a government.
- 2013: Kadima, which has suffered the split of Hatnua, is reduced to 2.1% of the vote and 2 seats in the general election. Hatnuah gets 5.0% and 6 seats.
- 2014: Hatnuah joins the Zionist Union list, along with the Labor Party and the Green Movement.
- 2014: Moshe Kahlon, a splinter from Likud, launches Kulanu. Kadima, whose latest leader has joined the brand-new Kulanu, withdraws from the next election.
- 2015: In the general election Hatnuah wins 6 seats from the Zionist Union list and Kulanu wins 7.5% and 10 seats. After the election, Moshe Feiglin leads his faction out of Likud and forms the (right-)libertarian Zehut.
- 2019: In the run-up of the April general election Hatnuah announces withdrawal and the party is dissolved with Livni's retirement from electoral politics. Kulanu wins 3.5% and 4 seats, while Zehut 2.7% and no seats. In the September general election Kulanu and Zehuts join forces with Likud. Kulanu gets one seat from Likud's list.
- 2020: In the general election Kulanu gets one seat from Likud's list, while Zehut stays out. In December Gideon Sa'ar, a splinter from Likud, launches New Hope. Kulanu's latest leader joins New Hope.
- 2021: In the general election New Hope wins 4.7% and 6 seats. Feiglin rejoins Likud.
- 2024: Feiglin quits Likud and re-establishes Zehut.

=== Party factions ===
- 2013: Within Likud, "Likud Liberals" (He) is established to push issues of individual freedom and economic liberalism. The group supports candidates Sharren Haskel (now New Hope) and Amir Ohana, who push liberal issues.
- 2019: Within Meretz, "Meretz Liberals" is established to push individual freedom, economic freedom and political freedom (including ending the Israeli Military Governorate in the West Bank). The group also pushes for a repeal of the Conscription law, School choice, reduction of import tariffs, reduction of regulation, separation of church and state, establishing a constitution for Israel, and lowering the electoral threshold.

== Media ==
- Haaretz

== See also ==
- Conservatism in Israel
- Jewish left
- Liberal hawk
- Liberal Zionism
- Progressive except Palestine
- History of Israel
- Politics of Israel
- List of political parties in Israel
