= Murder of Annie Ley =

Annie Ley was a French woman was murdered by a Palestinian militant in April 1991.

== Murder ==
On 29 April 1991, a group of 16 tourists from France stopped for lunch at the Al-Andalus Restaurant in Bethlehem, in the Palestinian West Bank. During their lunch, 64-year-old French citizen Annie Ley left the table to use the toilet. As she left the toilet to return to her table, she was ambushed by 19-year-old Palestinian man Khaled Asakreh, a waiter at the restaurant. Asakreh murdered her using a kitchen knife. The autopsy performed at Abu Kabir Forensic Institute indicated that Ley had attempted to fight back. Asakreh subsequently fled the restaurant.

Following the murder, the Israeli military imposed a curfew on Bethlehem and arrested thirty residents, including several employees at the restaurant. The military announced the arrest of Asakreh for the murder on 1 May 1991. In its first reports on the murder, the military indicated that it believed Asakreh was a Muslim fundamentalist.

Mayor of Bethlehem Elias Freij described the murder as "barbaric" and stated that "the right of worship in Bethlehem must be guaranteed by Arabs and I want all Arabs to condemn this act." The Palestine Liberation Organisation also condemned the murder, stating that "Palestinians are opposed to the recourse to violence against parties who have no link to the occupation of their territory."

== Trial ==
Asakreh was sentenced to life imprisonment for the murder. During his incarceration, he spent two years in a cell next to that of prominent Palestinian prisoner Marwan Barghouti.

== Release ==
Asakreh was released from prison in 2013, as part of the 2013–2014 Israeli–Palestinian peace talks, under the conditions that he not leave Bethlehem until 2014 and not leave the occupied Palestinian territories until 2024. At his release, the Palestine Authority held a welcome-home ceremony for him and provided him with financial support, including a brand new home and furniture. In an interview with The Christian Science Monitor following his release, Asakreh claimed to have "changed completely," saying that "I have a new vision, that the solution doesn’t come in violent ways."
