= Hatnua =

Centre-left Israeli political party

Hatnua התנועה
- Leader: Tzipi Livni
- Founded: 27 November 2012
- Dissolved: 18 February 2019
- Split from: Kadima
- Headquarters: Tel Aviv, Israel
- Ideology: Liberalism (Israeli); Liberal Zionism; Two-state solution; Secularism (Israeli); Environmentalism
- Political position: Centre to centre-left
- National affiliation: Zionist Union (2014–2019)
- Colors: Blue, white
- Most MKs: 8 (2012)
- Fewest MKs: 5 (2016)

Election symbol
- צפ

Website
- www.hatnua.org.il

Hatnua (Hebrew: הַתְּנוּעָה, lit. 'The Movement') was a liberal political party in Israel formed by former Israeli Foreign Minister and Vice Prime Minister Tzipi Livni to present an alternative to voters frustrated by the stalemate in the Israeli–Palestinian peace process.

The party was formed by dissidents in Kadima, which Livni, who had led the party's progressive wing, headed until March 2012 when she lost a leadership primary election to rival Shaul Mofaz, who was part of the party's more conservative wing. The party was based on the infrastructure of Hetz, a faction that broke away from Shinui in 2006. Relatively close in ideology to Yesh Atid and the Labor Party, which focused mostly on domestic and socioeconomic issues in their 2013 campaigns, Hatnua stood out for its aggressive push for a pragmatic peace settlement with the Palestinians.

In the 2013 legislative election, Hatnua ran on a joint list with the Green Movement, and incorporated many of its core ideals into the party's platform. Hatnua's 2013 platform emphasized Arab–Israeli peace, social justice, environmental protection, the integration of all citizens into the military and workforce, and religious pluralism.

In the 2015 legislative election, it ran on a joint electoral list with the Labor Party called the Zionist Union, which became the second-largest parliamentary group. In January 2019, Labor chairman Avi Gabay announced that Labor would not run with Hatnua in the April 2019 election. Following several weeks of poor poll results, Livni announced on 18 February 2019 that Hatnua would drop out of the election and that she was retiring from politics.

== History ==
=== Formation ===
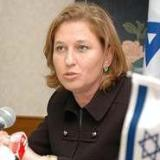
On 27 November 2012 Tzipi Livni officially announced the establishment of Hatnua

Following months of speculation, Livni announced the establishment of Hatnua at a press conference in Tel Aviv on 27 November 2012, describing it as a "liberal, secular, and democratic party," with "room for the very best of Likud" and Labor. In her announcement, Livni formed a new party after the government had entered into ceasefire negotiations with Hamas but there were no peace talks with the Palestinian Authority. In an op-ed for the Jerusalem Post, Livni described her goals as fighting for peace, security, a Jewish state and a democratic Israel, in addition to supporting Haredi conscription and promoting social justice.

The party was formed by taking over the remains of the Hetz party, also inheriting the NIS 1.8 million in the party's bank account. It began with seven members of the Knesset, all of whom were allies of Livni who were breaking away from Kadima.

Following its establishment, Ynetnews published a poll on 30 November 2011 showing Livni to be more favored than Labor leader Shelly Yachimovich, and overall the strongest candidate for Prime Minister against the incumbent, Netanyahu. On 1 December 2012, former Labor leader Amram Mitzna joined the party. A second former Labor leader, Amir Peretz, joined the party on 6 December. The party campaigned on diplomatic issues, mainly peace with the Palestinians and preserving international support for Israel.

Before forming Hatnua, Livni turned away an offer from Yair Lapid for the No. 2 seat on the Yesh Atid list, as well as an offer from Shelly Yachimovich for a seat on the Labor Party list.

In a Jerusalem Post interview, Livni said she created Hatnua because there was a vacancy for a non-socialist party "representing the need to relaunch negotiations." She suggested that other parties had narrow agendas and that her party would not ignore the Israeli–Palestinian conflict, which she said was connected to other issues affecting Israel.

Eighteen days before the 2013 election, Livni called on Yachimovich and Lapid to come together and form a united front against Likud Beiteinu. Both leaders were receptive to the idea, but Lapid said the parties should consider joining a Netanyahu-led government after the election to prevent extremist parties from joining the governing coalition.

=== 19th Knesset ===
In the 2013 Israeli legislative election, Hatnua won 6 seats with almost 5% of the votes, while the remainder of Kadima won 2 seats with 2% of the votes. The party had a surplus vote agreement with Meretz.

The six seats were taken by:

- Tzipi Livni
- Amram Mitzna
- Amir Peretz
- Elazar Stern
- David Tzur
- Meir Sheetrit

The party went on to win six seats in the 2013 Knesset elections. It did not endorse any candidate for prime minister to President Shimon Peres. Amid reports that coalition negotiations between Netanyahu and the Yesh Atid and Jewish Home factions, which formed an alliance, were floundering, Hatnua became the first party sign on to joining Benjamin Netanyahu's government. As part of its coalition agreement, Hatnua received the Justice Ministry (held by Livni) and the Environmental Protection Ministry (held by Peretz), and a ministerial team for the peace process with the Palestinians was established with Livni as chief negotiator. Coalition negotiations also involved the issue of ultra-Orthodox military conscription. Hatnua MK Elazar Stern, whose long-running work on the matter also formed Yesh Atid's position thereon, sought to stiffen sanctions against yeshivas that fail to meet conscription targets. Livni said she would not officially join Netanyahu's government without other centre-left parties; Yesh Atid eventually signed on as a coalition partner.

During his tenure as environmental protection minister, Peretz championed the slogan "it is impossible to separate environmental and social justice", and his campaigns within the ministry have followed suit. Many of the changes Peretz led involved minority or periphery communities, such as ongoing efforts to bring waste infrastructure to Arab towns and Bedouin villages, in particular. Other accomplishment involved the government approval of a NIS 45 million budget for addressing environmental deficiencies for residents of the south and the eradication of free plastic bags from grocery stores. With Livni's approval, he resigned as cabinet minister in November 2014, citing his frustration with Netanyahu's policies and the lack of peace negotiations. He remained a member of Hatnua and the governing coalition.

Hatnua often sparred with the Jewish Home, another coalition partner, particularly with regard to peace negotiations, which Hatnua continuously pushed for, and which the Jewish Home vehemently opposed. As Justice Minister, Livni also advanced a bill to give equal inheritance rights to same-sex couples.

On 2 December 2014, Netanyahu fired Livni from her cabinet portfolio, accusing her and Yesh Atid leader Yair Lapid then Minister of Finance, of conspiring to bring down the governing coalition in a "putsch". The following week, Hatnua agreed to run on a joint list with the opposition Labor Party in the ensuing March 2015 election, with Livni alleging that Likud had been taken over by right-wing extremists. If the joint list wins the election and is able to form a government, under the agreement, the position of Prime Minister would rotate between Livni and Labor leader Isaac Herzog. In protest of the alliance, Elazar Stern left the party on 20 December 2014 and soon joined Yesh Atid. Tzur, Mitzna, and Sheetrit announced their retirement from politics altogether; of them, Tzur and Mitzna expressed support for the alliance with Labor, while Sheetrit said he opposed it. Peretz, the only MK to join Livni, not only supported the alliance, but later added he would like to see a full merger between the parties.

As part of its agreement with Labor, Livni received the second spot on the joint list. Spots 8, 16, 21, 24, 25, and 28 were also reserved for Hatnua members, going, in order, to Peretz, former Kadima MK and Livni ally Yoel Hasson, Channel 9 journalist and analyst on Arab affairs Ksenia Svetlova, Maj. Gen. (res.) Eyal Ben-Reuven, Israeli Green Movement co-chair Yael Cohen-Paran, and former Kadima MK Robert Tiviaev.

=== 20th Knesset ===
In the 2015 elections Hatnua had seven seats reserved for it on the Zionist Union list, with five elected as the list won 24 seats. In September 2015, Hatnua MK Amir Peretz defected to their Zionist Union sister party Labor, thus reducing Hatnua's representation to 4 seats. In November 2015, Labor Party MK Danny Atar resigned from the Knesset to chair the Jewish National Fund, leaving Hatnua candidate Yael Cohen Paran, to replace him, increasing Hatnua's representation back to 5 seats. Cohen Paran's entrance in the Knesset brought the total number of female MKs to 32, the highest ever.

Hatnua's faction in the 20th Knesset comprised the following MKs:

- Tzipi Livni
- Yoel Hasson
- Ksenia Svetlova
- Eyal Ben-Reuven
- Yael Cohen Paran (also of the Green Movement)
- Robert Tiviaev

Amir Peretz was elected as a Hatnua member, but rejoined the Labor Party during the Knesset term.

On 1 January 2019 at a live televised Zionist Union party meeting, Labor leader Avi Gabay announced that Labor would not run with Hatnua in the upcoming April 2019 Israeli legislative election, surprising Livni. Electoral polls showed that Hatnua was not close to crossing the 3.25% electoral threshold, and Livni announced on 18 February 2019 that Hatnua would not run in the elections, so as not to split the centre-left vote, as well as her own retirement from politics.

== Ideology and politics ==
Hatnua was described as a liberal party adhering to secularism, environmentalism and liberal Zionism, news sources also noted the party's commitment to a two-state solution.

Having worked as Israel's lead peace negotiator, Livni is well respected internationally and has a good relationship with the Palestinian leadership. The party campaigned almost exclusively on foreign policy issues, pushing for renewed peace talks with the Palestinians and preserving support from the international community, especially the United States.

Livni has stated that there should be a three-step process in order to resume negotiations with the Palestinians; the first step would be to ensure coordination with America; the second step would be utilizing the EU to back the negotiations; the third step would be to direct negotiations with the Palestinians; she also stated that there would be no negotiations with Hamas unless it renounced terrorism. It was also committed to passing Basic Laws that protect the environment and social rights. It was in favor of a differential value added tax as well as canceling existing subsidies for West Bank settlements and ultra-Orthodox sectoral interests while increasing the fees charged for the mining of natural resources. Livni has long been an advocate for women's rights and gay rights, and her party supported same-sex marriage in Israel.

The party's social agenda was similar to that of other centre-left parties. Livni is socially progressive and is well known for having refused the coalition terms of religious parties as the leader of Kadima. Hatnua was liberal on matters of religion and state. Like Yesh Atid, it was in favor of conversion reform.

The party supported Third Way economic policies. It saw economic issues, as with other issues, as interconnected with the country's security and diplomacy situation. According to Livni, the absence of a peace deal can hinder Israel's economic growth and its chances of allying with moderate Arab states.

== Election results ==
Election	Leader	Votes	%	Seats	+/–	Status
2013	Tzipi Livni	189,167 (#7)	4.99	6 / 120	▼1	Coalition
2015	Tzipi Livni	Part of the Zionist Union		6 / 120	0	Opposition

== See also ==
- Category:Hatnua politicians
