= Yoel Hasson =

Israeli politician (born 1973)

- יואל חסון
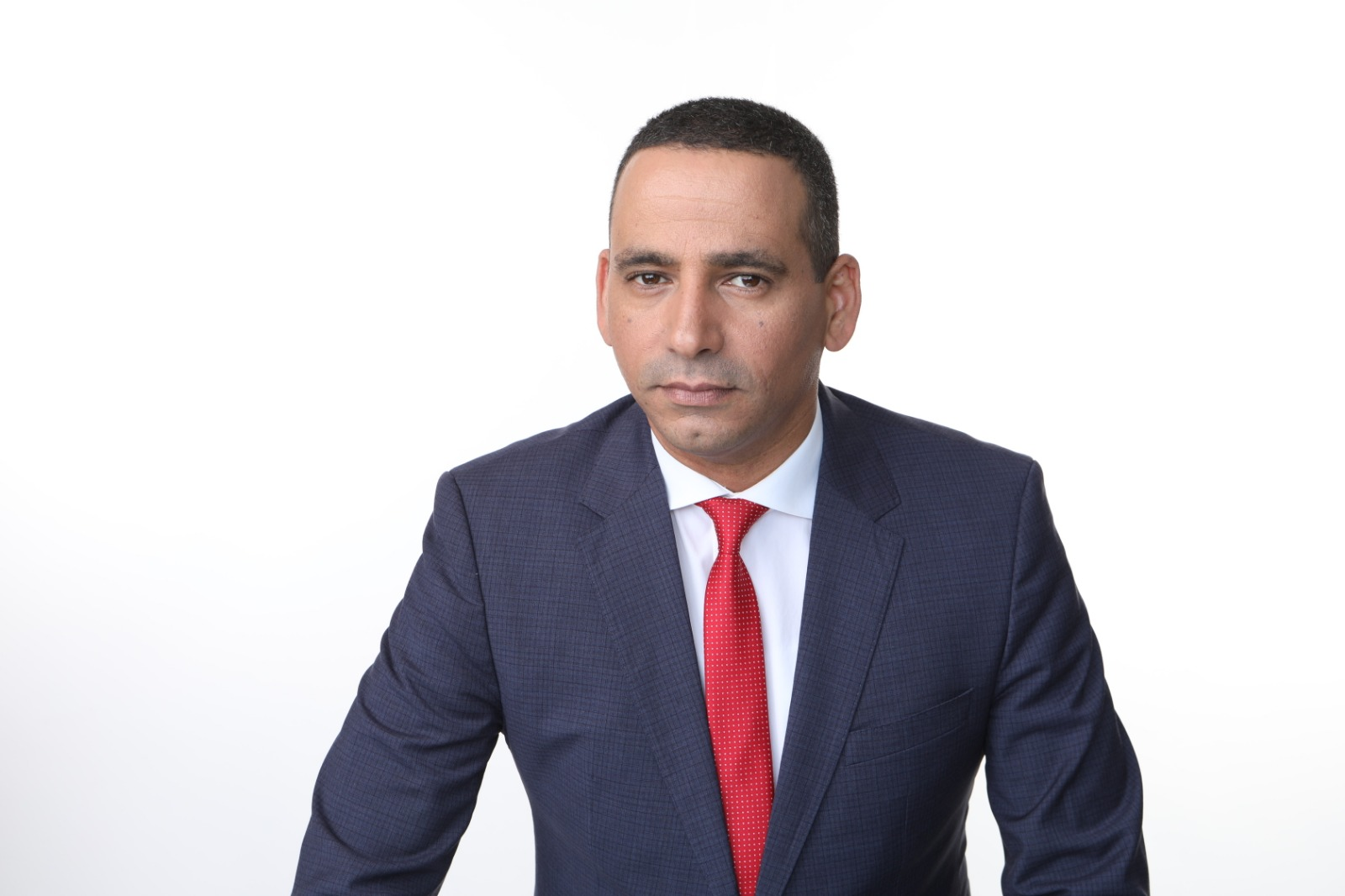

Faction represented in the Knesset
- 2006–2012: Kadima
- 2012–2013: Hatnuah
- 2015–2019: Zionist Union
- 2019: Hatnuah

Personal details
- Born: 2 April 1973 (age 53) Tel Aviv, Israel

Yoel Hasson (Hebrew: יואל חסון; born 2 April 1973) is an Israeli politician and member of the Knesset for Kadima and Hatnuah. Yoel has been a member of the seventeenth, eighteenth, and twentieth Knessets, and is currently a member of the opposition movement, in a center left party.

After being discharged from the IDF as a staff sergeant, he attended the Interdisciplinary Center in Haifa graduating with a BA in Government and Public Policy. In 1998, Hasson began his political career as the head of the national leadership of the Betar Movement. MK Hasson has worked in many committees throughout his career.

== Early life ==
Hasson was born in Tel Aviv and raised in Rishon LeZion. His parents were Tunisian Jewish immigrants. He attended junior high school at the David Raziel youth village, a boarding school in Herzliya, and joined the Betar movement at age 16. He completed his high school studies with a biological course at the Jabotinsky youth village in Be'er Ya'akov. Before joining the IDF, he spent a Service Year volunteering with at risk adolescent children. He served in the IDF as a Staff Sergeant for the Shlomo Ben Yosef Kernel, Battalion 905 of the Nahal Brigade.

Hasson later studied at IDC Herzliya and received a BA in Government and Public Policy. In April 2012, he married Tess Gadot, a news editor on the Knesset (Israeli Parliament) News Channel. They have a son named Ido.

== Political career ==
Hasson became involved in Israeli politics at a young age. In 1997, at the age of 24, Hasson began working as a parliamentary consultant for MK Uzi Landau, when Landau served as chairman of the Knesset Foreign Affairs and Defense Committee. From 1998 to 2001, Hasson acted as national head of Betar. In 2001, Hasson also became chairman of the Council of Israeli Youth Movements, a position he held until 2003. He also served as a member of the Authority for the Advancement of Women and the Israel Women's Network. After the Likud won the 2001 elections and Ariel Sharon became Prime Minister, Hasson was appointed head of the Public Affairs Division in the Prime Ministers Office. Hasson served as the advisor to the PM on Public Inquiries during Sharon's term.

In 2005, PM Sharon made a political shift, left the Likud and established the centrist Kadima party. Hasson and other figures from the liberal wing of the Likud and from the Labor party, such as Tzipi Livni and Shimon Peres, also joined Kadima under Sharon's leadership. In the 2006 elections, Hasson was elected 29th on Kadima's primary list, which won 29 seats for the Knesset.

In June 2006, Hasson was nominated as the president of the 35th World Zionist Congress.

== Knesset Term 17 ==
During Hasson's first term he served as chairman of the coalition, Kadima's Parliamentary Group Chairman, and the party's whip. He also served as chairman of the parliamentary Lobby for the Advancement of Young People in Israel and established the parliamentary Lobby for the Protection of Animals’ rights.

== Knesset Term 18 ==
Prior to the elections for the 18th Knesset, Hasson was elected 8th place in the Kadima primary list, then led by Tzipi Livni, holding 28 seats and being the largest opposition party to the Likud. He served as chairman of the State Control Committee until 2011. During his lead, the committee dealt with the Carmel fire Disaster, a deadly forest fire in 2010, and initiated a broad investigation on this issue by the State Comptroller. During that year he also founded the parliamentary lobby for the two-state solution. Shortly before the 2013 elections, Hasson and Tzipi Livni left Kadima and established the Hatnuah Party. Towards the Israeli legislative election, Yoel Hasson was placed seventh on the list of candidates for the newly established Hatnuah Party. However, the party won six seats, so he did not enter into the next Knesset term.

== Knesset Term 20 ==
Prior to the legislative elections in March 2015, Hasson was involved in the process of establishing the "Zionist Union", which is a political union between the Labor Party led by Isaac Herzog and Hatnuah Party led by Tzipi Livni. In January 2015 he joined the list of "Zionist Union" and was placed 16th. After the elections, which won the "Zionist Union" 24 seats, he was appointed deputy speaker of the Knesset. He serves as a member of the House Committee and the Science and Technology Committee. Along with MK Yoav Kish, Hasson established the parliamentary lobby for Israeli start-ups, which aims to improve the regulation on the Israeli start-up market and to give increased government support for young Israeli entrepreneurs. In addition, he holds the Presidency of the Canada-Israel inter-parliamentary friendship group along with MK Anat Berko.
