= Conservatism in Israel =

Conservatism in Israel is mostly based around upholding Jewish tradition, promotion of forms of Zionism that tend to be more irredentist in nature (i.e. Revisionist and Neo-Zionism, which promote the idea of Greater Israel as compared to Liberal or Labor Zionism, which are supportive of a two-state solution), promoting Israeli national security, maintaining the role of religion and the Rabbinate in the public sphere, support for the free market, and closer ties with the United States. However, a variety of ideological trends exist within Israeli conservatism, and not all hold up every single one of these ideals or points of view.

== Revisionist Zionism and conservatism ==
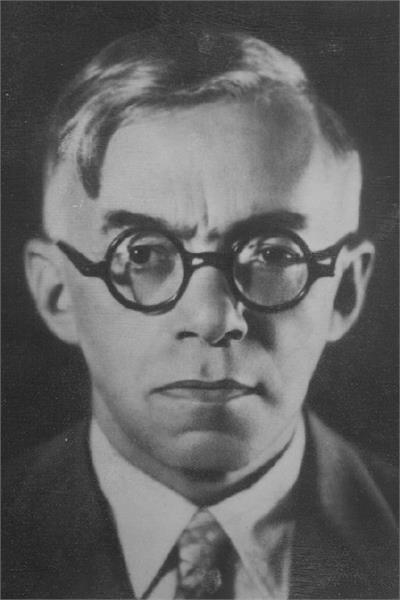
Ze'ev Jabotinsky

Revisionist Zionism was born as an ideology calling for the entire Mandate for Palestine, calling for Israeli sovereignty over "both banks of the Jordan". However, they eventually changed their position to "the whole land of Israel". Nonetheless, the ideological forefather for Revisionist Zionism, Ze'ev Jabotinsky, called for equal rights for Arabs who would live in a potential Jewish state, albeit with hostility towards other Arab states, in his essay The Iron Wall. For the most part, Revisionist Zionism initially lacked any clear ideology, with some variants calling for a bi-national liberal but nominally majority Jewish state, while other variants were outright fascist, sympathetic to Mussolini's Italy.

During the Mandate period, the early foundations of conservatism were being built by political parties like Hatzohar and Agudat Yisrael, as well as by the paramilitary group Irgun. Hatzohar, which was founded by Ze'ev Jabotinsky in 1923, called for the immediate establishment of the State of Israel "on both sides of the Jordan". Jabotinsky himself was a supporter of Western-style liberal conservatism and national liberalism, synthesizing them into his personal understanding of Revisionism. In 1925, Jabotinsky founded Betar as the youth wing of the party. However, Betar would gain influence beyond the party, becoming a major Jewish youth group in its own right, surviving long after Hatzohar itself was dissolved. After Jabotinsky's death in 1940, Irgun leader Menachem Begin took over Hatzohar, using it effectively as the political arm of his organization.

In Israel's early history as an independent state, Revisionist Zionism was not nearly as powerful of a political force as socialism and Labor Zionism. Herut, a party founded by former members of the Irgun, mostly remained as an opposition party throughout the 1940s through 1960s. It eventually formed a coalition, Gahal, with the Israeli Liberal Party, which would eventually become Likud in 1973. Revisionist Zionism has historically been the ideology associated with the Likud party, especially under Begin's leadership.

== Jewish religious conservatism in Israel ==
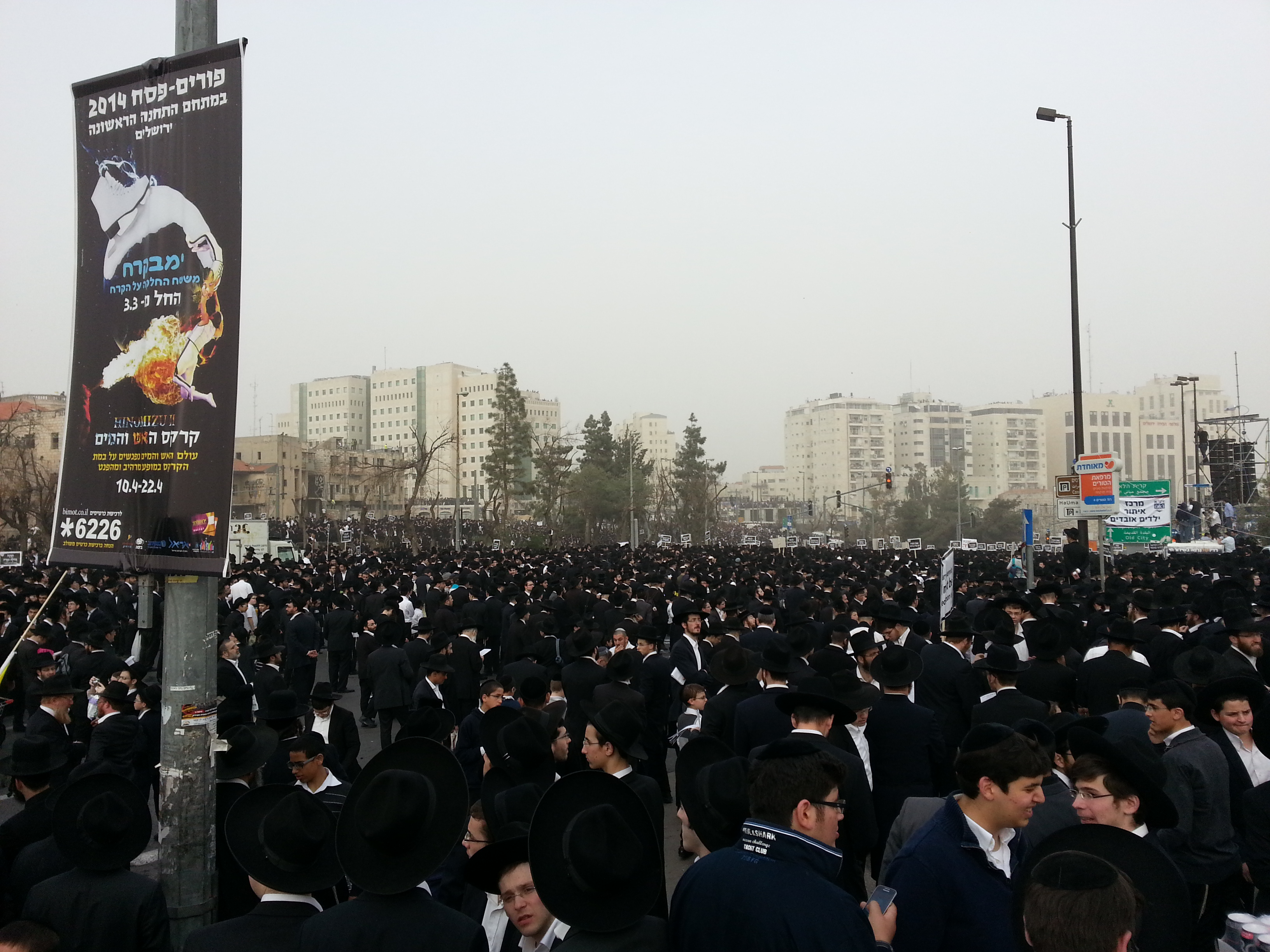
Yeshiva students during the demonstration in opposition to conscription

Most Haredi Jews in Israel are generally religiously conservative, with some expressing right-wing Zionist perspectives while others take non-Zionist or even anti-Zionist perspectives.

=== Religious Zionism ===
Religious Zionists also adhere to Jewish religious conservatism. For example, Rabbi Zvi Yehuda Kook's Gush Emunim movement sought to build settlements in the West Bank after the Six-Day War. Some extreme religious nationalists, such as Bezalel Smotrich and his Religious Zionist Party remain a part of the Israeli right to this day. Some conservative religious Zionists are more moderate, however. Shas is a political party representing mostly Sephardic and Mizrahi Jews in Israel who follow the Sephardic law and customs towards being a religious Jew. While both Zionist and religiously conservative, Shas has historically been more interested in representing Sephardic Haredi interests rather than promoting settlements or upholding a particular view of the conflict.

== "Neo-Zionism" ==
"Neo-Zionism" is a term often used to refer to a more generic form of Israeli right-wing nationalism, combining aspects of both Religious and Revisionist Zionism. Most notably, Neo-Zionism is notable for its relations with other illiberal and right-wing populist movements globally, it's criticism of Labor Zionism specifically and pro-peace Zionists more broadly, especially those that promote a two-state solution to the conflict, support for a strong security policy based on American neoconservative ideas, and supports the goal of building a "Greater Israel" in the West Bank (which they call Judea and Samaria) and Gaza. One of the most notable neo-Zionist groups is Im Tirtzu, which campaigns against left-wing, liberal, and post-Zionist academics in Israeli universities and colleges. Many have also referred to Benjamin Netanyahu's leadership over Likud to be neo-Zionist in nature.

== Arab and Islamic conservatism in Israel ==
Conservatism in Israel is not limited to Israeli Jews, as there are many Israeli Arabs who are conservative as well. Mansour Abbas split from the Arab, secular, and mostly left-wing Joint List coalition over his advocacy for conversion therapy. Abbas' political party, Ra'am, is a socially conservative and moderate Islamist party focusing on anti-LGBT policies, law and order, and supporting a two-state solution. Ra'am mostly gains support from Bedouin Arabs living in the Negev.

== See also ==
- Far right in Israel
- Jewish conservatism
- Sephardic Haredim
