= David Tzur =

Israeli politician

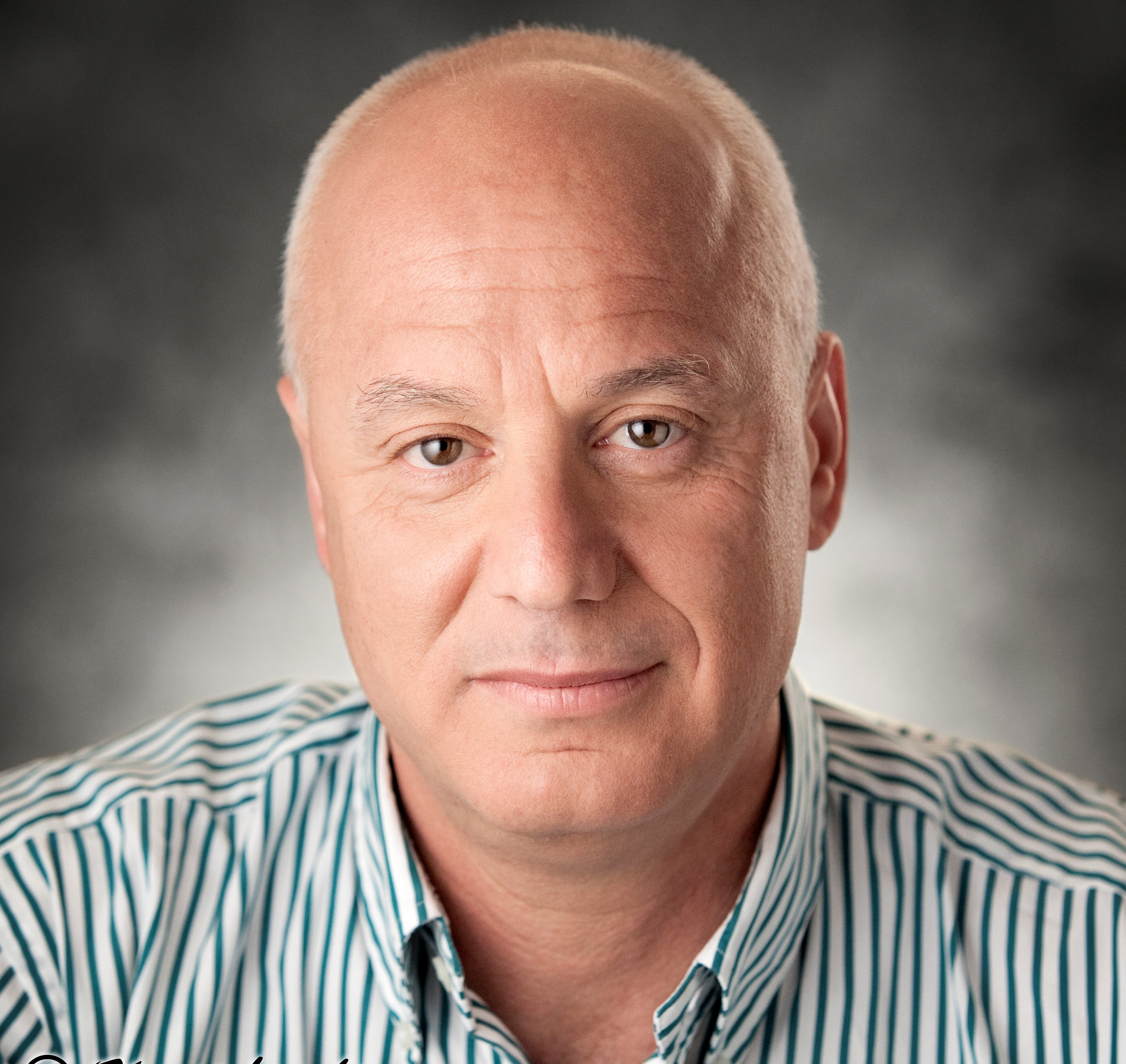

Faction represented in the Knesset
- 2013–2015: Hatnuah

Personal details
- Born: 15 July 1959 (age 66) Istanbul, Turkey

David Tzur (Hebrew: דָּוִד צוּר; born 15 July 1959) is an Israeli politician and former policeman. He served as a member of the Knesset for Hatnuah between 2013 and 2015.

== Biography ==
Born in Istanbul, Turkey, Tzur immigrated to Israel at the age of six and settled in Ashkelon. He began his career with Israel Police in the Counter-Terrorism Unit. In the mid-1990s he took a leave of absence to work as a security consultant for the 1996 Summer Olympics in Atlanta. When he returned to Israel he was appointed Deputy Chief of the Operations Department of the police force.

In 2000 Tzur became Chief of Staff of the Ministry of Public Security. He served as commander of the Israel Border Police between 2002 and 2004, and the District Commander of the Police in Tel Aviv from 2004 to 2008. He had previously served as commander of an elite counter-terrorism unit in the Israel Defense Forces and the Coastal Plain District Police.

Prior to the 2013 Knesset elections Tzur joined the new Hatnuah party, and was placed sixth on its list. He became a Knesset member when the party won six seats. He left the party in December 2014, and did not contest the 2015 elections.
