= 2013–2014 Israeli–Palestinian peace talks =

Failed peace talks between Israel and the Palestinian Authority

The 2013–2014 Israeli–Palestinian peace talks were part of the Israeli–Palestinian peace process. Direct negotiations between Israel and the Palestinians began on 29 July 2013 following an attempt by United States Secretary of State John Kerry to restart the peace process.

Martin Indyk of the Brookings Institution in Washington, D.C. was appointed by the US to oversee the negotiations. Indyk served as U.S. ambassador to Israel and assistant secretary of state for Near East affairs during the Clinton administration. Hamas, the Palestinian government in Gaza, rejected Kerry's announcement, stating that Palestinian president Mahmoud Abbas has no legitimacy to negotiate in the name of the Palestinian people.

The negotiations were scheduled to last up to nine months to reach a final status to the Palestinian-Israeli conflict by mid-2014. The Israeli negotiating team was led by veteran negotiator Justice Minister Tzipi Livni, while the Palestinian delegation was led by Saeb Erekat, also a former negotiator. Negotiations started in Washington, DC and were slated to move to the King David Hotel in Jerusalem and finally to Hebron. A deadline was set for establishing a broad outline for an agreement by 29 April 2014. On the expiry of the deadline, negotiations collapsed, with the US Special Envoy Indyk reportedly assigning blame mainly to Israel, while the US State Department insisted no one side was to blame but that "both sides did things that were incredibly unhelpful."

== Pre-peace talk compromises ==
Before the peace talks began, both sides offered concessions. The Palestinian Authority offered to put on hold international recognition as a state by applying to international organizations while Israel offered the release of 104 Palestinian prisoners, 14 of whom are Arab-Israelis and all of whom had been in Israeli jails since before the 1993 Oslo I Accord. The prisoners were responsible for killing, in all, 55 Israeli civilians, 15 Israeli security forces personnel, one French tourist and dozens of suspected Palestinian collaborators.

Commenters have however pointed out that Israel had already promised to release these same 104 Palestinians, back in 1999 under the Sharm el-Sheikh Memorandum, but never did. Critics also worry that Israel will simply quietly re-arrest the potentially released Palestinians, and state that Israel is using the slow release to hold the negotiations hostage and that the main goal of the release is to bolster Israel's image. According to the Sharm el-Sheikh Fact-Finding Committee Report, Israel's decision not to release the prisoners at the time was due to significantly increased violence against Israel by their partner in the memorandum, the PLO, leading up to the Second Intifada. In the time leading up to the planned release, Israel perceived "institutionalized anti-Israel, anti-Jewish incitement; the release from detention of terrorists; the failure to control illegal weapons; and the actual conduct of violent operations" as a sign that "the PLO has explicitly violated its renunciation of terrorism and other acts of violence, thereby significantly eroding trust between the parties."

== Discussions ==
Over the 9 months period, John Kerry met with the Palestinian president Mahmoud Abbas on 34 occasions, and Israeli prime minister Benjamin Netanyahu roughly twice as many times. On 29 July 2013, as Israeli and Palestinian negotiators met for a second day in Washington to discuss renewing peace talks, Mahmoud Abbas said "in a final resolution, we would not see the presence of a single Israeli – civilian or soldier – on our lands." His comments drew immediate condemnation from Israeli officials, who accused him for discriminating against Jews.

On 13 August, the first day, the Palestinian team leaders were Saeb Erekat and Muhammed Shtayyeh while their Israeli counterparts were Tzipi Livni and Yitzhak Molcho. The US mediators were Martin Indyk and Frank Lowenstein. On 13 August, Israel released the first batch of 26 Palestinian prisoners. On 19 August, Mahmoud Abbas called for the US to step up its involvement in the talks, saying its role should be proactive and not merely supervisory. On 20 August, Israel urged the United States to back Egypt's military government, saying failure to do so would risk derailing the peace talks. On 22 August, Mahmoud Abbas said that no progress had been made in the first four talks. He also said that the Palestinian right of return would likely have to be waived in the event of any peace agreement. He also walked back his earlier statement that he wanted a Palestinian state without a single Israeli; he said that what he meant was no Israelis who were "part of the occupation", but that he wouldn't have a problem with Jews or Israelis coming to Palestine for business or tourism reasons, as long as they were not an occupying force.

On 5 September 2013, Palestinian negotiator Nabil Shaath said that Israel has yet to put any new offers on the table, that Israel has only allowed Martin Indyk to attend one of the six talks so far, and that the Palestinian leadership would not accept "temporary solutions", only a permanent peace deal. On 8 September, Israel accused the Palestinians of leaking information about the talks, which are supposed to be kept secret, to the press. An Israeli official also stated that some of the information leaked by Palestinians was not true. On 25 September, both Israel and the Palestinians agreed to intensify peace talks with an increased United States role.

On 26 September, Mahmoud Abbas spoke in front of the UN Security Council, and welcomed the resumption of peace talks while at the same time criticizing Israel's settlement building. The Israeli delegation was not present for Abbas' speech, because they were observing the holiday of Sukkot. Hamas and the Islamic Jihad called for a third intifada, and a spokesman for Hamas' armed wing said that the current peace talks were "futile".

On 17 October 2013, Abbas reiterated his view that he would not accept any Israeli military presence on Palestinian territory. On 22 October, Israel and the Palestinians are reported to have discussed the issue of water. On 27 October, Israel prepared to release another round of Palestinian prisoners to create a positive climate for the ongoing peace talks. On 28 October, Netanyahu categorically rejected the Palestinian right of return and said that Jerusalem must remain undivided. On 29 October, the second stage of the Palestinian prisoners' release was completed as 26 prisoners were released.

On 6 November, Israeli negotiators said there will not be a state based on the 1967 borders and that the Separation Wall will be a boundary. On 14 November, the Palestinian team quit the negotiations blaming the "escalation of settlement-building."

On 4 December 2013, Saeb Erekat told John Kerry that the peace talks with Israel were faltering and urged Kerry to salvage them. Also, an Israeli newspaper reported that Israel was prepared to hand 2000 hectares (5000 acres, or 7 sq. mi.) of land to the Palestinians to show that it was prepared to allow Palestinian projects on these lands. The land had been privately owned by Palestinians but militarily occupied by Israel. On 26 December, Likud ministers led by Miri Regev began pushing a bill to annex the Jordan Valley, which would prevent Netanyahu from accepting the American proposal for the Jordan Valley and border crossings into Jordan to be placed under Palestinian control, with border security provided by IDF soldiers and the US. On 30 December, Saeb Erekat said that the peace talks had failed, citing the aforementioned Israeli bill to annex the Jordan Valley. Erekat said that denying the Palestinian state a border with Jordan would be a clear step toward apartheid, and that the PA should instead unilaterally seek international recognition and membership in organizations. Erekat also said that "Israel wants to destroy the two-state solution through its daily practices." The PLO senior official also rejected the idea of extending the peace talks beyond their nine-month deadline. On 30 December, Israel released its third set of prisoners, consisting of 26 Palestinian security prisoners.

On 1 January 2014, Maariv reported that Israeli and American leaders had been discussing, and seriously considering, the possibility of ceding parts of the Arab Triangle to the Palestinians in exchange for Jewish settlements in the West Bank. The residents of the Triangle would automatically become Palestinian citizens if this happened. This idea is similar to the Lieberman Plan. Rami Hamdallah also said that despite Erekat's insistence that the talks had failed, the Palestinians would continue participating in the talks until the April deadline. On 5 January, hardliners in Netanyahu's coalition threatened to withdraw from the government if he accepted the 1967 borders as a baseline for talks. Dovish opposition parties, such as Labor, said they would join if this occurred, in order to prevent the coalition from breaking up completely. On 9 January, according to insiders, support for a two-state agreement within the Knesset stood at 85 in favor to 35 opposed. In addition to the Labor Party, American negotiators were also attempting to persuade Haredi parties Shas and United Torah Judaism, both of which are generally supportive of the peace process, to join the government to keep negotiations alive.

On 10 January 2014, Israel approved plans for 1,400 settler homes. Saeb Erekat responded by saying "The recent announcement shows Israel's clear commitment to the destruction of peace efforts and the imposition of an apartheid regime". Tzipi Livni, who also opposed new settler homes, was responded by Israeli politician Ze'ev Elkin, who suggested the settlements were vital for Israel's security: "The path that Livni recommends means we will have to say goodbye to our security," he said. On 14 January, Israel's defense minister Moshe Ya'alon rejected the negotiations and insulted John Kerry, saying he was acting based upon "messianic feeling", and that "The only thing that can 'save' us is that John Kerry will get a Nobel Peace Prize and leave us alone." Yuval Steinitz, another members of the Likud, expressed general agreement with Ya'alon's views, but disagreed with the personal insult. However, Yaalon later issued an official apology in a written statement sent to media from the Defense Ministry. On 18 January, Israel's finance minister Yair Lapid threatened to take his party, Yesh Atid, out of the coalition if peace talks did not advance. This would have toppled the government and forced either the formation of a new coalition, or early elections.

On 21 January 2014, Israel announced plans for 381 new settler homes in the West Bank. The Palestinians condemned this move, and also ruled out the possibility of the peace talks extending beyond the nine-month deadline. On 22 January, Abbas said he would like Russia to take a more active role in the negotiations. On 27 January, the Palestinians said they would not allow "a single settler" to remain in a Palestinian state, but that this did not stem from anti-Jewish attitudes. Rather, Jews living in the West Bank would have the option of remaining if they renounced their Israeli citizenship and applied to be citizens of Palestine. A poll has shown that 4.5% of Jewish settlers would consider becoming Palestinian citizens under such an arrangement. On 31 January, according to Martin Indyk, the framework for the US-backed Middle East peace deal will allow up to 80 per cent of Jewish settlers to remain in the West Bank. The deal would redraw borders so that some 80 per cent of settlers' homes would be redesignated as being in Israel, while other parcels land would be handed back to Palestinian control in a proposed land-swap deal. Another key point of the framework would be that Israel would be allowed to retain a role in maintaining security along the West Bank's border with neighbouring Jordan. The new security arrangements would see a zone created with hi-tech fences equipped with sensors and drone surveillance planes flying overhead. Also the final peace treaty could also provide compensation for victims on both sides of the historic conflict.

On 3 February 2014, Abbas suggests that US-led NATO troops patrol a future Palestinian state instead of Israeli troops having a presence in Jordan Valley, but Israeli settlers and soldiers have five years to leave Palestine once the state is formed. On 6 February, Israel reportedly sought to annex 10 percent of the West Bank, but Palestinian negotiators insisted that they keep at least 97 percent. On 9 February, ministers voted down a proposal by Likud legislator Miri Regev to annex certain West Bank settlements and the roads leading to them.

During the course of negotiations, Netanyahu followed the precedent of Israel's former Prime Minister Ehud Olmert and made recognition of Israel as a Jewish state a requirement for peace. Some news sources falsely reported that Netanyahu was the first Israeli Prime Minister to make such a requirement. Urging Abbas to recognize Israel as the Jewish-nation state, he reportedly said:

'it's time for the Palestinians to stop denying history. Just as Israel is prepared to recognize a Palestinian state, the Palestinian leadership must be prepared to recognize the Jewish state. In doing so you will tell your people that, though we have a territorial dispute, Israel's right to exist is beyond dispute. You would finally make it clear that you are truly prepared to end the conflict."

To that end, he announced his intention to introduce such a definition of Israel in a Basic Law. The proposed law would be in addition to Israel's declaration of independence of May 1948 which defines Israel as a Jewish state. Justice Minister Tzipi Livni expressed concern over the proposal. Although she was in favor of defining Israel more clearly in law as "the national home of the Jewish people and a democratic state", she has expressed opposition to "any law that gives superiority" to the Jewish nature of state over the country's democratic values. Livni also said she could only support legislation where "Jewish and democratic would have the same weight, not more Jewish than democratic, nor more democratic than Jewish".

Abbas dismissed this demand, pointing out that the Palestinians had already extended recognition of the State of Israel, both in 1988 and in the 1993 Oslo Accords. He added that, neither Jordan nor Egypt, with whom Israel had made peace treaties had been asked to recognize Israel's Jewish character. The Palestinians would never accept Israel as a 'religious state' since, it would damage the rights of Israel's Palestinian minority and

'to accept it now as a Jewish state would compromise the claims of millions of Palestinian refugees whose families fled the fighting that followed Israel's creation in 1948 and were not allowed to return."

On 28 March 2014, Israel failed to release the fourth tranche of 26 Palestinian prisoners, as scheduled, in what Palestinian sources say was a violation of the original terms for the peace talks, According to Israeli officials, the Palestinians had publicly claimed that they would break off peace talks once the final batch of prisoners were released. Israel reportedly demanded an extension of the April 29 deadline before the release. The agreement had included a Palestinian undertaking not to sign up for international conventions. After Israel withheld the prisoners' release, Mahmoud Abbas went ahead and signed 15 conventions regarding adhesion to human and social rights. Israel then demolished several EU funded humanitarian structures in E1 and stated the prisoners' release depended on a Palestinian commitment to continuing peace talks after the end of April deadline. Some days later, Israel approved tenders for 708 more Israeli residential units beyond the Green Line, in Gilo, followed by various sanctions against Palestinians in retaliation for their joining of international conventions.

At the end of March, Haaretz reported that the United States, Israel and the Palestinian Authority were negotiating a "grand bargain" to "salvage peace talks". Kerry and Netanyahu discussed a possible deal to extend them until the end of 2014 and to ensure the Palestinians didn't make unilateral moves at the United Nations. The Israeli proposal conditioned the release of the fourth tranche of 26 Palestinian prisoners on an extension of the negotiations beyond the current deadline of 29 April and included the release about 400 low-profile Palestinian prisoners, as well as the 26 high-profile prisoners, including 14 Israeli Arabs. It excluded the high-profile prisoners Marwan Barghouti and Ahmad Saadat who Israel categorically refused to release. Israel also offered to put an unofficial freeze on most settlement construction outside of East Jerusalem for the next eight months. Israel said it would resolve the status of family reunification requests submitted by some 5,000 families in the West Bank and Gaza. According to Israeli officials, the United States would release Jonathan Pollard as a concession to Israel. On 23 April 2014, The Jerusalem Post reported that Abbas listed 3 conditions for extending peace talks beyond the 29 April deadline; that the borders of a future Palestinian state be dealt with during the first three months of the extended talks, a complete freeze on all settlement construction, and the release without deportation of the fourth batch of Palestinian prisoners, including Israeli-Arabs.

== 2014 Fatah–Hamas Reconciliation ==
Israel reacted angrily to the Fatah–Hamas Gaza Agreement of 23 April 2014 whose main purpose was reconciliation between Fatah and Hamas, the formation of a Palestinian unity government and the holding of new elections. Israel halted peace talks with the Palestinians, saying it "will not negotiate with a Palestinian government backed by Hamas, a terrorist organization that calls for Israel's destruction", and threatened sanctions against the Palestinian Authority, including a previously announced Israeli plan to unilaterally deduct Palestinian debts to Israeli companies from the tax revenue Israel collects for the PA. Israeli Prime Minister Benjamin Netanyahu accused Abbas of sabotaging peace efforts. He said that Abbas cannot have peace with both Hamas and Israel and has to choose. Abbas said the deal did not contradict their commitment to peace with Israel on the basis of a two-state solution and assured reporters that any unity government would recognize Israel, be non-violent, and bound to previous PLO agreements. Shortly after, Israel began implementing economic sanctions against Palestinians and canceled plans to build housing for Palestinians in Area C of the West Bank. Abbas also threatened to dissolve the PA, leaving Israel fully responsible for both the West Bank and Gaza, a threat that the PA has not put into effect.

Notwithstanding Israeli objections and actions, a Palestinian Unity Government was formed on 2 June 2014.

== Break-down of the talks and post-mortem assessments ==
On 2 May 2014, the Hebrew daily newspaper Yedioth Ahronoth cited an anonymous senior American official as placing the blame for the break-down in talks mainly on Israel's settlement stance, directly quoting the remark: 'Netanyahu did not move more than an inch." Israeli sources in Jerusalem later reported that the remarks came from the US Special Envoy Indyk himself, who was reportedly preparing to hand in his resignation. Whoever the source of the comment, the White House cleared the interview in which the remarks were made. In this the officials appeared to be referring to the Israeli government announcement of a record 14,000 new settlement housing units. Mark Landler has written that the remark attributed to Indyk reflected the President's own views:

Publicly, Mr. Obama has said that both sides bear responsibility for the latest collapse. But the president believes that more than any other factor, Israel's drumbeat of settlement announcements in the West Bank and East Jerusalem poisoned the atmosphere and doomed any chance of a breakthrough with the Palestinians.

In a talk later given at the Washington Institute for Near East Policy, Indyk stated that Netanyahu had shown enough flexibility to come within the zone of an agreement. However, Indyk also stated that Netanyahu was undermined by members of his coalition, who kept making announcements of new settlements. Although Israeli sources insisted that Netanyahu negotiated in good faith. In an interview with The New York Times, Indyk further added that his impression was that, 'For Israelis . .(t)The Palestinians have become ghosts,' citing what he felt was the most meaningful personal moment in the talks, when the Palestinian Director of Intelligence, Majed Faraj, told his Israeli counterparts across the table, "You just don't see us." He also said that "there is so much water under the bridge... the difficulties we faced were far more because of the 20 years of distrust that built up".

Pope Francis during his three-day pilgrimage to the Middle East, intervened in the collapsed peace process, endorsing the State of Palestine, calling the situation "increasingly unacceptable" and issuing an invitation to both the Israeli and Palestinian presidents to join in a prayer summit at his home in the Vatican. A meeting was scheduled to that effect for 6 June.

In June 2014, a leaked recording from an unknown date showed that chief Palestinian negotiator Saeb Erekat believed the reason Netanyahu entered the peace talks was to build more settlements and disliked how President Mahmoud Abbas had committed to not go to international bodies.

However, Israeli national security adviser Joseph Cohen revealed a 65-page document that chief Palestinian negotiator Saeb Erekat submitted to Palestinian Authority President Mahmoud Abbas on 9 March, three weeks before Israel was to release the final batch of Palestinian prisoners. In it, Erekat proposed a strategy for the PA during the final month of negotiations and after 29 April, when the talks were originally scheduled to end before their premature collapse. Erekat recommended applying to join various international conventions, informing the U.S. and Europe that the Palestinians wouldn't extend the talks beyond 29 April, demanding that Israel nevertheless release the final batch of prisoners, intensifying efforts to reconcile with Hamas to thwart what he termed an Israeli effort to sever the West Bank from Gaza politically, and various other diplomatic and public relations moves. Cohen concludes that even while the Palestinians were talking with Washington about the possibility of extending the peace talks, they were actually planning to blow them up, and had been planning to do so even before Abbas met with U.S. President Barack Obama on 17 March.

According to Peace Now, during the nine months of peace talks Israel set a new record for settlement expansion at nearly 14,000 newly approved settler homes. Despite freezing settlements was not a precondition to restart peace talks, Palestinian official Nabil Shaath condemned settlement construction, saying "the settlement activities have made negotiations worthless." For its part, Israeli spokesman Mark Regev condemned sporadic Palestinian incitement, saying "the terrorist attacks against Israelis over the last few days are a direct result of the incitement and hatred propagated in Palestinian schools and media." According to B'Tselem, during this same period forty-five Palestinians and six Israelis were killed.

== Reactions ==
US Secretary of State John Kerry said that if the peace talks failed, there would likely be a third intifada. Despite all efforts of John Kerry, Palestinian president Mahmoud Abbas blamed Israel for the lack of progress, saying "the problem is with the Israeli side and not with us." In January, a PLO member reported that the US implied a threat to cut all aid to the Palestinian Authority and a future inability to control Israeli settlement expansion if a peace agreement was not reached.

EU Ambassador to Israel, Lars Faaborg-Andersen said if peace talks fail, Israel will likely be blamed for the break down. Yair Lapid said that the country could be targeted by an economically costly boycott if peace talks with the Palestinians fail, signalling that concerns about growing international isolation have moved centre stage in Israel's public discourse.

Some critics believe that Israel is only trying to "put on a show," claiming the Israelis do not seek a peace agreement, but are using these peace talks to further other goals, including improving their image, strengthening their occupation of the West Bank, and decreasing the viability of Palestine as a state free of Israeli occupation. Henry Siegman faults the United States, arguing that it is 'widely seen as the leading obstacle for peace' for its repeated failure to use leverage against Israel, and for failing to impose red lines for an agreement, and leading Israeli leaders to believe no consequences would ensue were Israel to reject American proposals.

Danny Danon stated that the Palestinians failed to make concessions during the negotiations period and that they were only interested in seeing militants released from prison. Netanyahu told Kerry "I want peace, but the Palestinians continue to incite, create imaginary crises and avoid the historical decisions necessary for a real peace."

== Reactions to Israeli settlements approvals ==
Israel was accused by Palestinian officials of trying to sabotage the peace talks by approving nearly 1200 new settlement homes shortly before the negotiations were due to start. Israeli settlements are considered illegal under international law, though Israel disputes this. Israeli government spokesman Mark Regev stated that these settlements would "remain part of Israel in any possible peace agreements."

The British Foreign Office Minister Alistair Burt said: "We condemn the recent decisions taken by the Israeli authorities to advance plans for 1096 settlement units in the West Bank, and to approve the construction of 63 new units in East Jerusalem. Israeli settlements are illegal under international law, undermine trust and threaten the viability of the two-state solution."

On 13 August, Israel approved another 900 settler homes in East Jerusalem in addition to the 1,200 settlements announced on the 10th. On 30 October, Israel stated it would go ahead with plans to build 3,500 more homes for settlers. Netanyahu then said "any further settlement construction may stir unnecessary clashes with the international community".

== See also ==
- 2014 Fatah–Hamas Gaza Agreement
- 2014 kidnapping and murder of Israeli teenagers
- Kidnapping and murder of Mohammed Abu Khdeir
- 2014 Israel–Gaza conflict
