= Tzipi Livni =

Israeli politician (born 1958)

- ציפי לבני
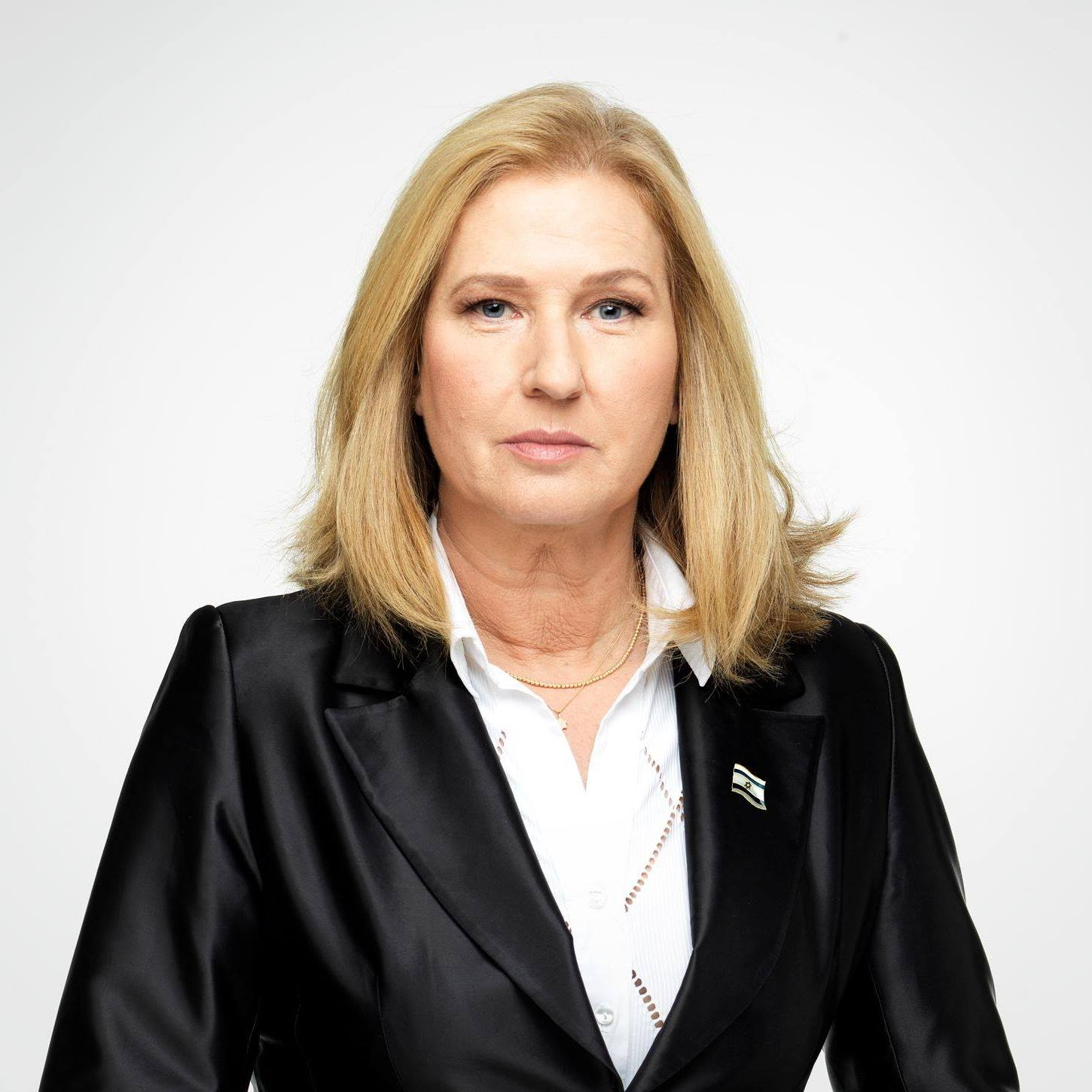
- Livni in the 2010s

Leader of the Opposition
- In office 1 August 2018 – 1 January 2019
- Prime Minister: Benjamin Netanyahu
- Preceded by: Isaac Herzog
- Succeeded by: Shelly Yachimovich
- In office 6 April 2009 – 2 April 2012
- Prime Minister: Benjamin Netanyahu
- Preceded by: Benjamin Netanyahu
- Succeeded by: Shaul Mofaz

Ministerial roles
- 2001: Minister of Regional Cooperation
- 2001–2002: Minister without Portfolio
- 2002–2003: Minister of Agriculture
- 2003–2006: Minister of Immigrant Absorption
- 2004–2005: Minister of Housing and Construction
- 2006–2007: Minister of Justice
- 2006–2009: Minister of Foreign Affairs
- 2013–2014: Minister of Justice
- 2013–2014: Minister for the Promotion of the Diplomatic Process

Faction represented in the Knesset
- 1999–2005: Likud
- 2005–2012: Kadima
- 2013–2014: Hatnua
- 2014–2019: Zionist Union
- 2019: Hatnua

Personal details
- Born: 8 July 1958 (age 68) Tel Aviv, Israel
- Spouse: Naftali Spitzer
- Children: 2
- Parent(s): Eitan Livni; Sara Rosenberg
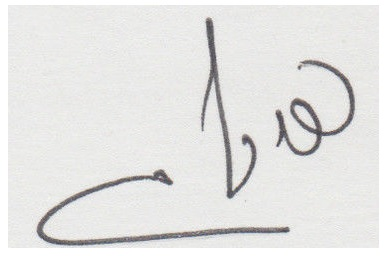
- Signature

Tziporah Malka "Tzipi" Livni (Hebrew: ציפי (ציפורה) מלכה לבני, pronounced [tsiˈpoʁa malˈka ˈtsipi ˈlivni]; born 8 July 1958) is an Israeli politician, diplomat and lawyer. A former member of the Knesset and leader in the center-left political camp, Livni is a former foreign minister, vice prime minister, minister of justice, and leader of the opposition. She is known by some for her efforts to resolve the Israeli–Palestinian conflict. Widely considered the most powerful woman in Israel since Golda Meir, Livni has served in eight different cabinet positions throughout her career, setting the record for most government roles held by an Israeli woman. She was the first female Israeli vice prime minister, justice minister, agriculture minister, and housing minister.

Born to a prominent right-wing, revisionist Zionist family, Livni has become one of Israel's leading voices in support of a two-state solution—one that ensures Israel's security and identity as a Jewish and democratic state. Among her supporters in Israel and in international media, Livni was given the nickname "Mrs. Clean" for her image as an "honest politician."

From 2001 to 2009, Livni served in the cabinets of Ariel Sharon and Ehud Olmert, most notably as foreign minister, during which time she led multiple rounds of peace talks with the Palestinians. In September 2008, Livni prepared to take office as prime minister, but the political climate in the country prevented her from forming a government. The following year, she led her party to win a plurality of seats in the Knesset, but was again blocked from becoming prime minister, due to the rightist parties' majority in the Knesset. Consequently, she served as leader of the opposition from 2009, until her resignation from the Knesset in 2012.

Later that year, Livni founded a new party, Hatnuah, to compete in the 2013 elections, after which she was appointed justice minister in the Thirty-third government of Israel, again leading a new round of Israeli–Palestinian peace talks. In December 2014, a number of policy disputes within the government led Benjamin Netanyahu to dismiss Livni from his cabinet, which led to new elections. In the 2015 election, Livni joined forces with Labor Party leader Isaac Herzog to create the Zionist Union, a unified bloc of their two parties. In January 2019 Avi Gabay announced that Labor would not run with Hatnuah in the April 2019 Israeli legislative election. On 18 February 2019, following several weeks of poor poll results, Livni announced her retirement from politics as well as Hatnuah's withdrawal from the election.

== Early life and education ==
Born in Tel Aviv, Livni is the daughter of Eitan Livni (born in Poland, now part of western Belarus) and Sara (née Rosenberg), both prominent former Irgun members. After the establishment of the State of Israel in 1948, Eitan and Sara Livni became the first couple to marry in the country of Israel. Her father served as the chief operations officer of the Irgun.

As a child, Livni was a member of the Betar youth movement and played basketball for Elitzur Tel Aviv. Growing up in an Israel dominated by the Israeli Labor Party, Livni says she felt marginalized, believing that the establishment had minimized her parents' contribution to Israel's founding. Despite the hard-line image of the Irgun, she says her parents had respect for the Arabs and acted only against the British army, not civilians.

During the 1984 Likud primaries, her father, who had served in the Knesset for Herut and Likud as a moderate, did not campaign for a seat in the Knesset, and urged party members to support a Druze candidate instead because he thought it important for Likud to have Arab representation.

== IDF service and Mossad ==
Livni served in the IDF, attaining the rank of Lieutenant. Livni began studying law at Bar-Ilan University in 1979, but suspended her law studies when she joined the Mossad in 1980. She served in the Mossad from 1980 to 1984, between the ages of 22 and 26. According to an interview in Yedioth Ahronoth described in The Sunday Times, she served in the elite unit responsible for the assassinations following the Munich massacre. She resigned from the Mossad in August 1984 to marry and finish her law studies.

== Education, family, and legal career ==
Livni graduated with an LL.B. from Bar-Ilan University's Faculty of Law in 1984. She practiced at a private firm for about ten years, specializing in commercial law, public law, and real estate law, before entering public life in 1996.

Livni resides in Ramat HaHayal, Tel Aviv. She is married to advertising executive Naftali Spitzer, and the couple have two children, Omri (born 1987) and Yuval (born 1990). Spitzer, who was raised in a Mapai-supporting family but switched to Likud in 1996, has gone on to support his wife's political career from the start in the 1990s.

Livni is a vegetarian. Besides her native language, Hebrew, Livni also speaks fluent English and French, having lived in Paris for a number of years.

Livni's father, Eitan Livni, a Herut member of Knesset, died in 1991. Her mother, Sara, who died in 2007, stood by Livni's decision to leave Likud and also accepted her support for the two-state solution, although it "hurt her."

== Political career ==
Livni entered politics in 1996 when she ran for a spot on Likud's Knesset list and was given place number 36 on the slate. Likud won 32 seats in the 1996 election, leaving her out, but newly elected Prime Minister Netanyahu appointed her as director general of the government-owned corporations authority, where she oversaw the privatization of a number of companies. While in this capacity, in 1998 she was considered a prominent candidate to become director general of the Finance Ministry.

Livni would later rue the decision to privatize certain companies and natural resources. As Hatnuah chairwoman in 2013, she wrote: "I am not sure that today I would once again privatize Israel Chemicals and the natural resources at the Dead Sea."

=== 1999–2005: Likud ===
Livni was first elected to the Knesset as a member of the Likud in 1999. She initially did not take an active role in lawmaking. When Ariel Sharon became prime minister in 2001, he appointed her to numerous positions in his cabinet. Her first cabinet position as a Likud member was Minister of Regional Co-operation which she held from 7 March 2001 until 29 August 2001. In December 2002 Sharon appointed her to serve as Minister of Agriculture. She held this position until February 2003. In 2003, Livni was appointed Minister of Immigrant Absorption. She held this position until 2006. In 2004, Livni was appointed Minister of Housing and Construction, a position which she held until 2005. After Shinui left the coalition, Sharon appointed her Minister of Justice. In this capacity, Livni's prominence on the national stage grew, and she was considered a person of integrity who stood on the side of the rule of law, particularly with respect to various corruption cases attributed to different members of her party.

Livni was an avid supporter of Sharon's disengagement plan, and was generally considered to be among the key moderate members of the Likud party. She often mediated between various elements inside the party, and was integral to garnering government support for disengagement with the "Livni Plan". She made efforts to achieve a two-state solution to the Israeli–Palestinian conflict, including successful efforts to have the pullout from the Gaza Strip ratified by the Knesset. On 12 November 2005, she spoke at the official annual commemoration of Yitzhak Rabin's assassination. In 2004, she received the Abirat Ha-Shilton ("Knight of Governance") award.

=== 2005–2012: Kadima ===
On 20 November 2005, Livni, a member of Likud's moderate wing, formed the Kadima Party with Sharon and Ehud Olmert. Ahead of the 28 March elections, Livni was appointed to be the new foreign minister, while continuing to serve as justice minister, as a result of the mass resignation of Likud Party members from the government.

In the selection of candidates for the March 2006 Knesset election, Livni was awarded the number three position on Kadima's list of candidates, which effectively guaranteed her election to the Knesset.

== 2006–2009: Foreign Minister of Israel ==
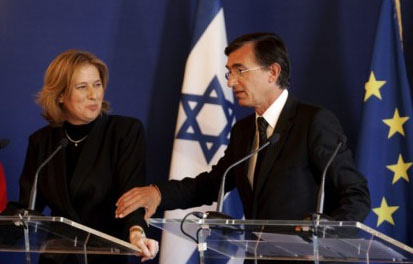
Livni and French FM Douste-Blazy

In 2006, Livni was appointed as Israel's minister of foreign affairs. She held this position until 2009. In Ehud Olmert's government, Livni was also appointed designated acting prime minister (also known as vice prime minister), taking the place of the prime minister if he or she is outside the country or temporarily or permanently unable to fulfill his or her duties. She ceased serving as Justice Minister at that time, but again held that position from 29 November 2006 to 7 February 2007, while still serving in her primary role of foreign minister.

As foreign minister, Livni was in charge of negotiations with the Palestinian Authority. During these negotiations, she raised the possibility of fixing the future border between Israel and the future Palestinian state so as to place Israeli Arab towns within the Palestinian state, an idea originally suggested by Israeli politician Avigdor Liberman. Her record for pragmatism as foreign minister earned her a high level of respect among US, European, and even Arab diplomatic circles, that has lasted even after she left the post.

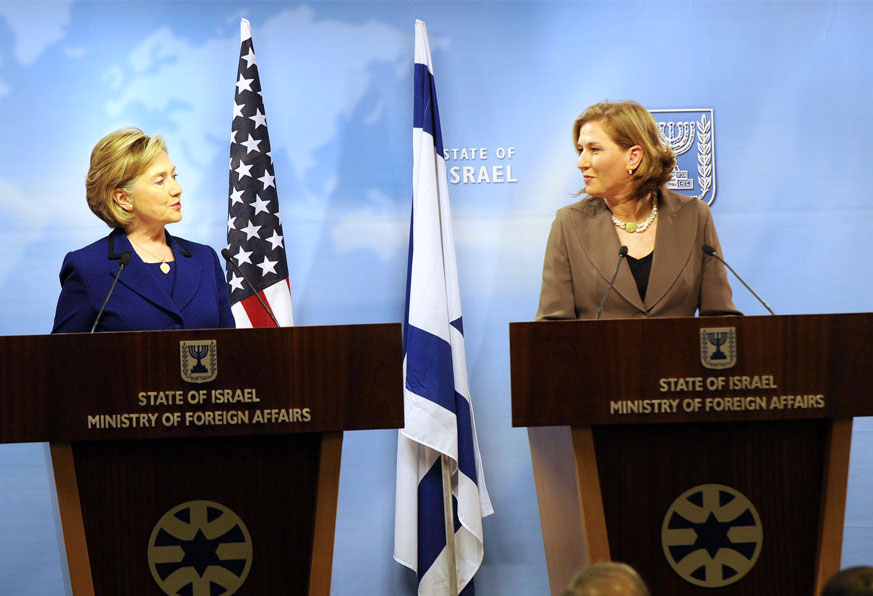
Livni and U.S. Secretary of State Hillary Rodham Clinton, 2009

After the March 2006 Knesset election, she was described as "the second most powerful politician in Israel". Livni is the second woman in Israel to hold the post of foreign minister, after Golda Meir. In 2007, she was included in the Time 100 Most Influential People in the World. Forbes ranked her the 40th most powerful woman in the world in 2006, 39th in 2007, and 52nd in 2008.

Livni became the first Israeli cabinet minister to explicitly differentiate Palestinian guerrilla attacks against Israeli military targets from terrorist attacks against civilians. In an interview on the US television news show Nightline, recorded on 28 March 2006, Livni stated, "Somebody who is fighting against Israeli soldiers is an enemy and we will fight back, but I believe that this is not under the definition of terrorism, if the target is a soldier."

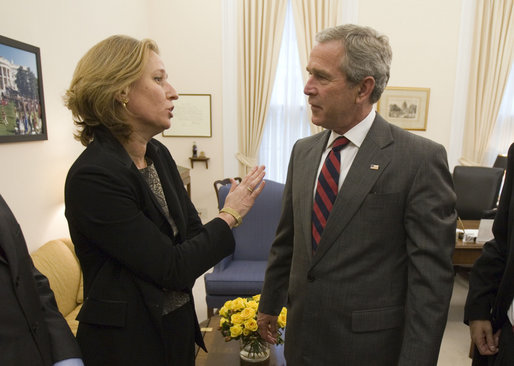
Livni meets with President George W. Bush

In 2007, she met with Palestinian prime minister, Salam Fayyad, to discuss "improving the lives of the Palestinian people, without compromising Israel's security."

On 2 May 2007, Livni called for Olmert's resignation in the wake of the publication of the Winograd Commission's interim report criticizing Olmert and Defense Minister Amir Peretz for their handling of the Second Lebanon War in 2006. She offered herself as leader of Kadima if Olmert decided to step down, and asserted her confidence in her ability to defeat him in a party election should he decline. However, her call was ignored by Olmert and her decision to stay in the Cabinet sparked some controversy.

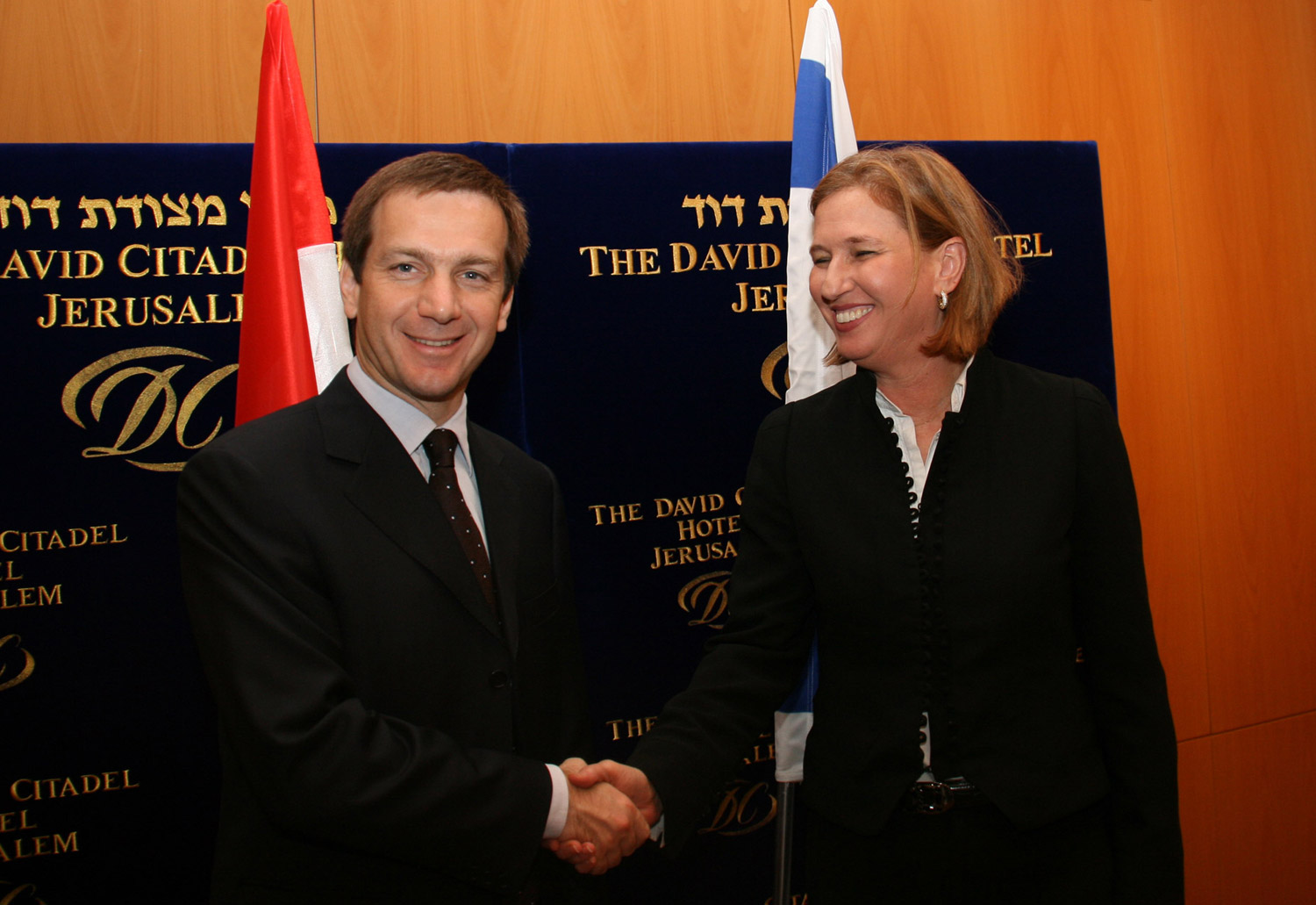
Livni and Hungarian PM Gordon Bajnai

In 2008, Livni condemned a photomontage of Pope Benedict XVI with a swastika displayed on his chest, which was published on a website run by supporters of her Kadima party.

== 2008–2009: Candidate for Prime Minister ==
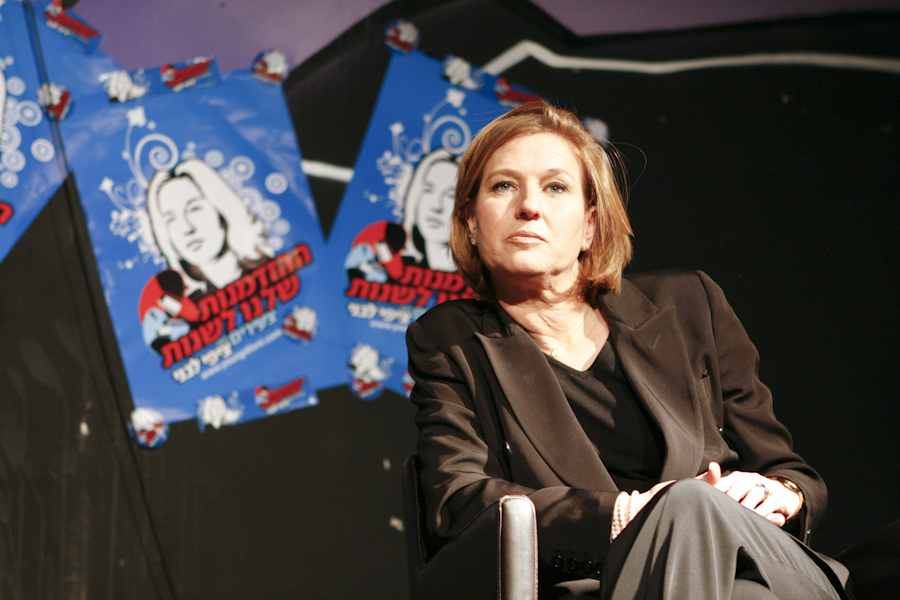
Youth for Tzipi Livni party 2009.

=== Kadima leadership victory ===
Facing multiple criminal investigations for corruption, Ehud Olmert announced his intention to resign his post as prime minister following a Kadima leadership election, which was held on 17 September 2008. Livni and Shaul Mofaz emerged as the main rivals for the leadership. Livni won the Kadima leadership election by a margin of just 431 votes (1%). Palestinian peace negotiators were reportedly pleased with the result.

=== Forming a government ===
As the new leader of the ruling party, Livni became prime-minister designate. Upon declaring victory, she stated "the national responsibility (bestowed) by the public brings me to approach this job with great reverence."

On 21 September 2008, Olmert formally resigned in a letter submitted to president Shimon Peres, and the following day Peres formally asked Livni to form a new government. Livni faced tough negotiations with Kadima's coalition partners, particularly the Shas party, which had set conditions for joining a Livni government, including an increase in child allowances to Haredi communities, and a vow not to negotiate the status of Jerusalem during peace talks with the Palestinians. Livni was able to sign a coalition agreement with the Labor party, led by former prime minister Ehud Barak, but on 26 October, informed the President that she was unable to form a government and suggested Israel go to elections. Livni cited her unwillingness to sell out her principles just to become prime minister, stating, "I was willing to pay a price to form a government, but I was never willing to risk the political and economic future of Israel. If someone is willing to sell out his principles for the job, he is not worthy of it." For its part, Likud, the main opposition party led by Benjamin Netanyahu, lobbied Shas and other parties essential to Livni's government to support early elections.

=== 2009 elections ===
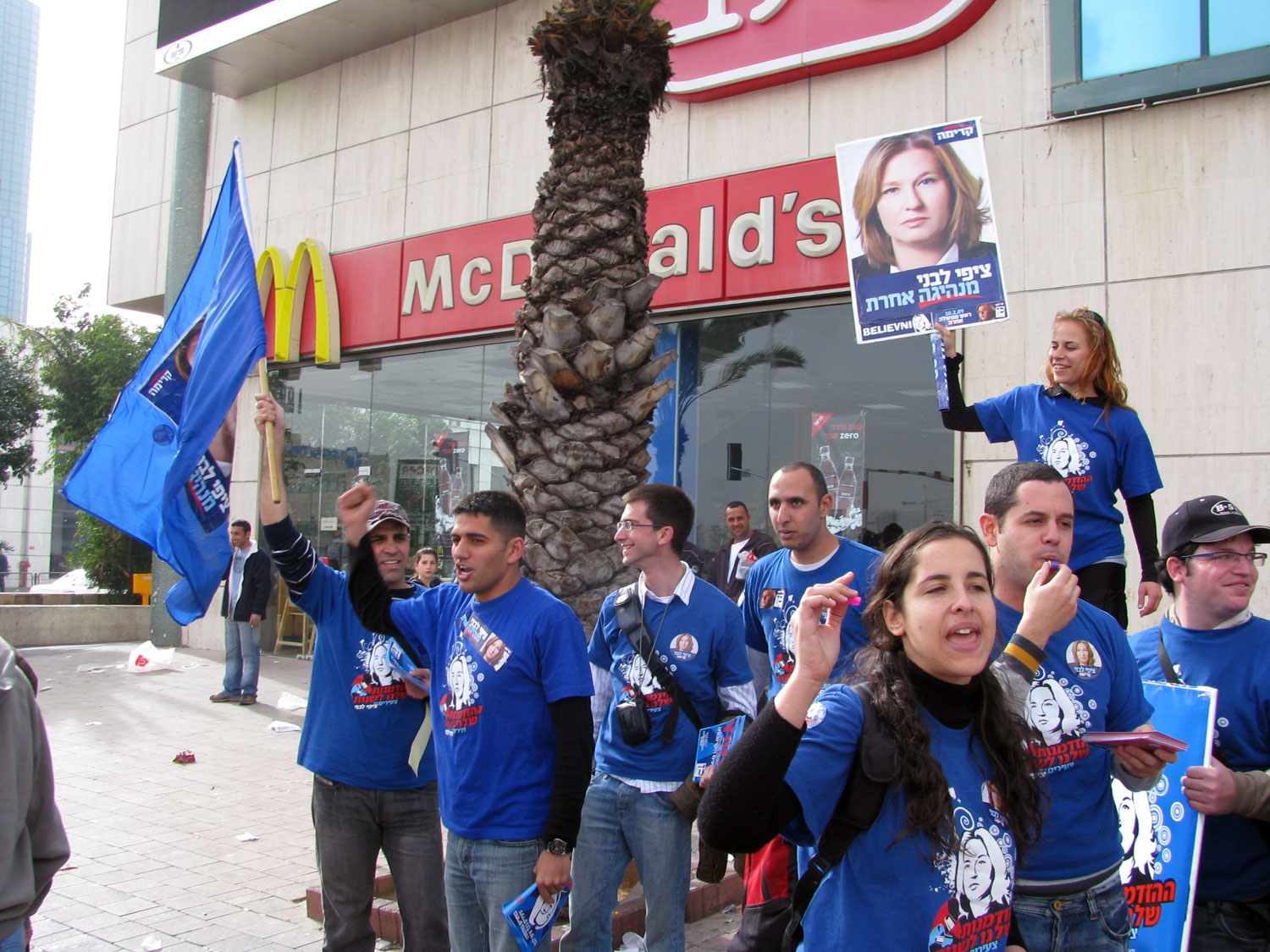
Kadima youth activists, 2009

In February 2009 Israel held elections for the Knesset. Livni, foreign minister and head of the Kadima party, campaigned against Benjamin Netanyahu of the Likud party to lead the new government. While election results gave Kadima the most seats in the Knesset, parties to the right in Israel's political spectrum gained enough seats that a coalition government under Kadima leadership was unlikely. As a result, Israeli president Shimon Peres asked Netanyahu and Likud (which received one fewer seat than Kadima in the elections) to form a government; this was the first time in Israel's history that the party with the most seats was not asked to attempt to form a government.

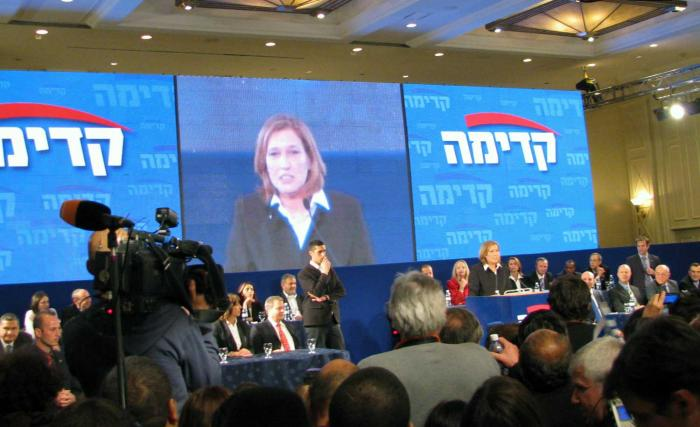
Livni declares victory in 2009 elections

The New York Times commended Livni for "refusing the extortionist conditions set by Shas," and endorsed her candidacy for prime minister, saying Israelis would have "a clear choice in February between a leader who has the courage to abandon tired old thinking on politics and security and one who has not." Although it expressed some doubts, the Israeli newspaper Haaretz also endorsed Livni for prime minister.

When Livni was tapped to form the next governing coalition, Palestinian political analyst Mahdi Abdel Hadi said that Livni had been received warmly in the Gulf, and that she was the leader most Arabs want to see as Israel's next prime minister. During the 2009 general elections, Arab media depicted her very negatively but as the lesser of the evils.

== 2009–2012: Leader of the Opposition ==
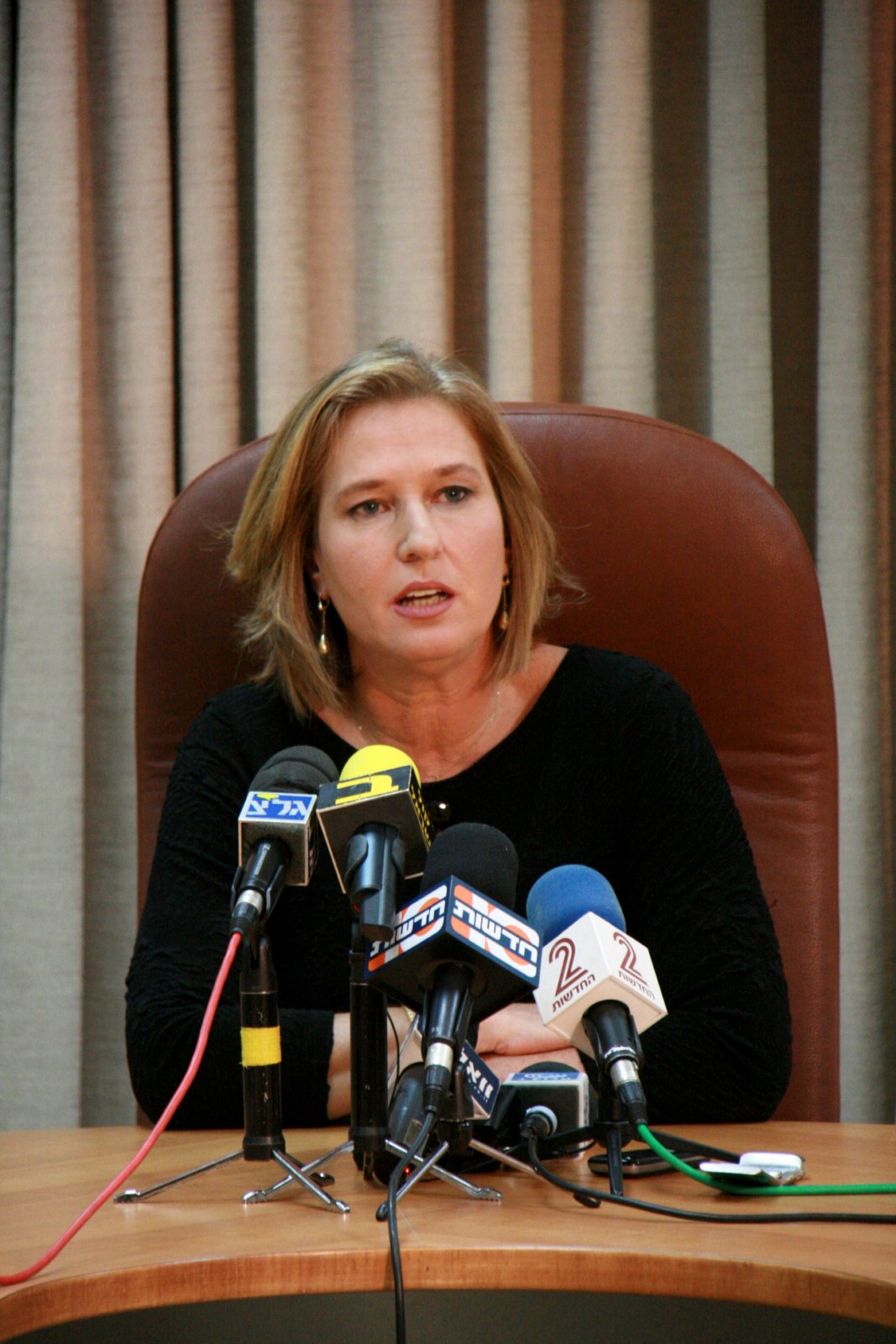
Livni upon assuming the role of Leader of the Opposition in the Knesset

Following the 2009 elections in which Livni's Kadima won the most seats, but could not form a government, she took the party into opposition, becoming Israel's first female leader of the opposition.

After an internal Foreign Ministry document stated that some European Union countries were considering freezing a planned upgrade in relations with Israel, Livni, as opposition leader, wrote in the message addressed to EU foreign policy chief Javier Solana, the EU's external relations commissioner Benita Ferrero-Waldner, and the EU's current council president, Czech foreign minister Karel Schwarzenberg: "You all know my commitment to peace between Israel and its neighbors and to the two-state solution, a commitment shared with the majority of the Israeli public. I believe that this kind of attitude, one which directly links an upgrade in relations with regional diplomatic progress, is overlooking the substantial gains that the upgrade could provide both to the people of Israel and the people of Europe."

On 25 May 2009, Livni told Harvard University students: "On the Iranian issue, there is no opposition or coalition in Israel. ... Iran represents the threat of extreme Islamic state". She said Iran was a threat to other countries in the region, and Iran must be stopped from attaining nuclear weapons.

Prior to Lebanon's 2009 general elections (and its inclusion of Hezbollah), Livni "acknowledged an important principle" from U.S. President Barack Obama's then-recent speech in Cairo that "Elections alone do not make true democracy." She explained her position in a New York Times op-ed by alluding to her experience as Israel's justice minister when Hamas participated in Palestinian elections in 2006: "At the time, the counterargument was that the very participation in elections would act as a moderating force on extremist groups. With more accountability, such groups would be tempted to abandon their militant approach in favor of a purely political platform. But this analysis ignored the possibility that some radical groups sought participation in the democratic process not to forsake their violent agenda but to advance it." Livni advocated that "the international community must adopt at the global level what true democracies apply at the national one—a universal code for participation in democratic elections. This would include requiring every party running for office to renounce violence, pursue its aims by peaceful means and commit to binding laws and international agreements." She added: "The intent here is not to stifle disagreement, exclude key actors from the political process or suggest that democracy be uniform and disregard local cultures and values."

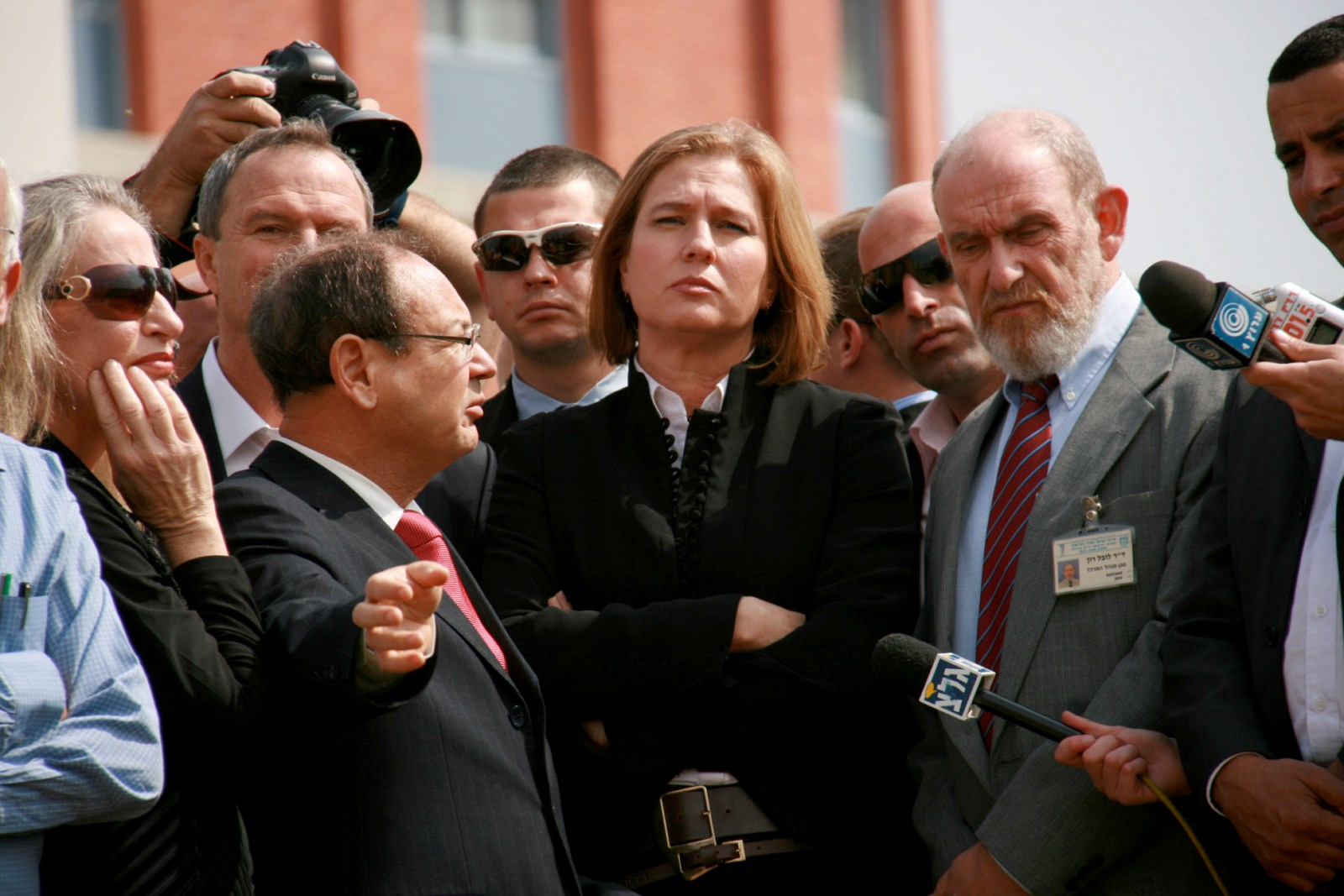
Livni visiting a medical center in Ashkelon with members of Kadima

Livni voiced support for Israel's gay community ahead of Gay and Lesbian Pride Month in June 2009. She addressed an event held at the gay community's municipal center in Tel Aviv's Meir Park. After a 1 August 2009 attack on a gay youth center that left two people dead and 15 wounded in Tel Aviv, Livni, who is in contact with the gay and lesbian community, said "This event should shake up society, and all the circles inherent in it, including the political establishment and the education system, and on this day deliver an unequivocal message against intolerance, incitement and violence, and to act against any manifestation of these." She attended a rally near the location of the attack, along with hundreds of Israelis and some other politicians, and urged Israel's gay and lesbian community to continue living their lives, despite the "hate crime." Livni opposed Netanyahu's land reform bill.

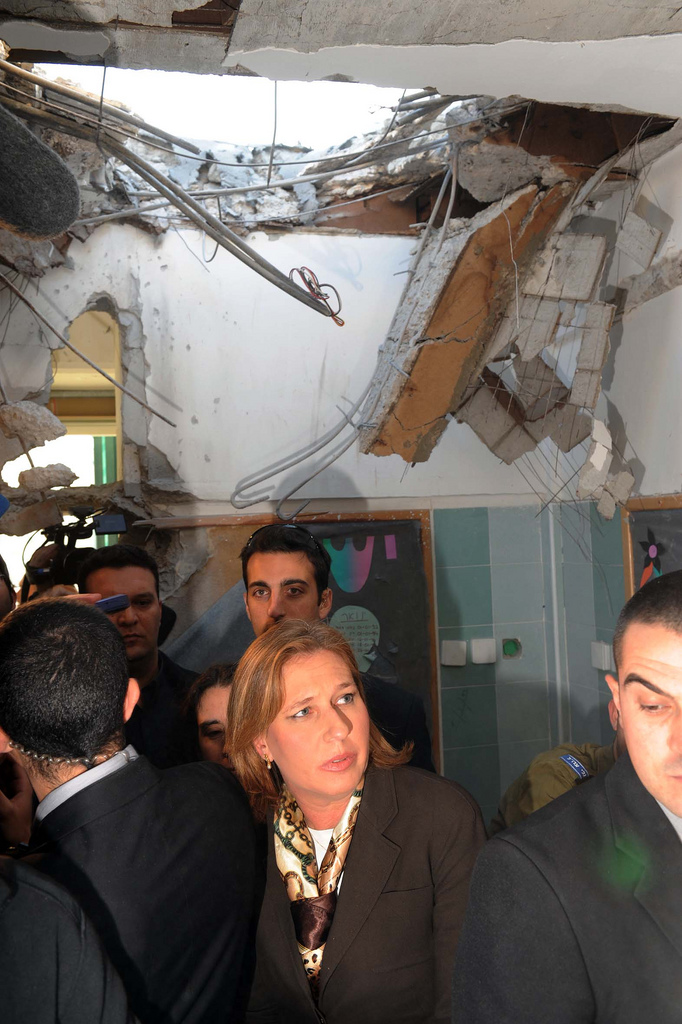
Livni touring the site of a kindergarten hit by bombs from Gaza

On 8 October 2009, Livni was honored by Yale University as a Chubb Fellow for her work and the inspiration spurred by her activities. She is the third Israeli leader to receive this honor after Shimon Peres and Moshe Dayan. The list also includes former U.S. Presidents Jimmy Carter and Bill Clinton. Livni referred to the Goldstone Report accusing Israel of committing war crimes in Gaza, and said there was a huge ethical gap between those seeking to murder children in their homes and those unintentionally harming civilians used by terrorists as human shields. Referring to the Israeli shelling of several UN schools in Gaza where thousands of civilians were taking shelter during the 2008–2009 Israel–Gaza conflict, Livni insisted that she "regret(s) every civilian casualty, but what happened at the UN school was not a mistake." Addressing the peace process, Livni said Israel is not involved in it as a favor to anyone, but that it is in the interest of all parties. At her next stop in Miami, Livni became the first Israeli woman to receive the International Hall of Fame Award from the International Women's Forum.

As opposition leader, Livni noted in a 2009 Knesset speech that she herself did not support Yitzhak Rabin's policies at the time. "The dispute is around the question of whether you can have it both ways—maintaining Israel as a Jewish state and keeping the entire Land of Israel," she said. Political analysts see Livni's speech at the 2003 commemoration rally for Rabin as a turning point in her political career when she became more popular among the Israeli peace camp. She delivered a speech which many found deeply moving in which she said the day Rabin was murdered was "the day that the skies fell down on me because of what happened to us, to all the citizens of Israel." As foreign minister, Livni would again attend the memorial for Rabin in 2009. Labor Party officials were not keen on this idea, fearing that her appearance would cost them votes. Some Kadima officials also seemed reluctant, fearing her appearance at left-wing event would send some votes Likud's way. Livni attended the memorial for Rabin in 2009.

After a draft document authored by Sweden (the then-holder of the rotating EU presidency) surfaced that calls officially for a division of Jerusalem and implies that the EU would also recognize a unilateral Palestinian declaration of statehood, Livni wrote a letter to Swedish Foreign Minister Carl Bildt, saying it was "wrong and not helpful," and that she conveyed "deep concern regarding what appears to be an attempt to prejudge the outcome of issues reserved for final status negotiations." European efforts to "dictate for either party the nature of the outcome on the status of Jerusalem," she said, would only serve to endanger the fulfillment of "our shared vision of two states for two peoples into a reality." Livni also called on France to speak up against the draft during her meeting with Sarkozy in Paris.

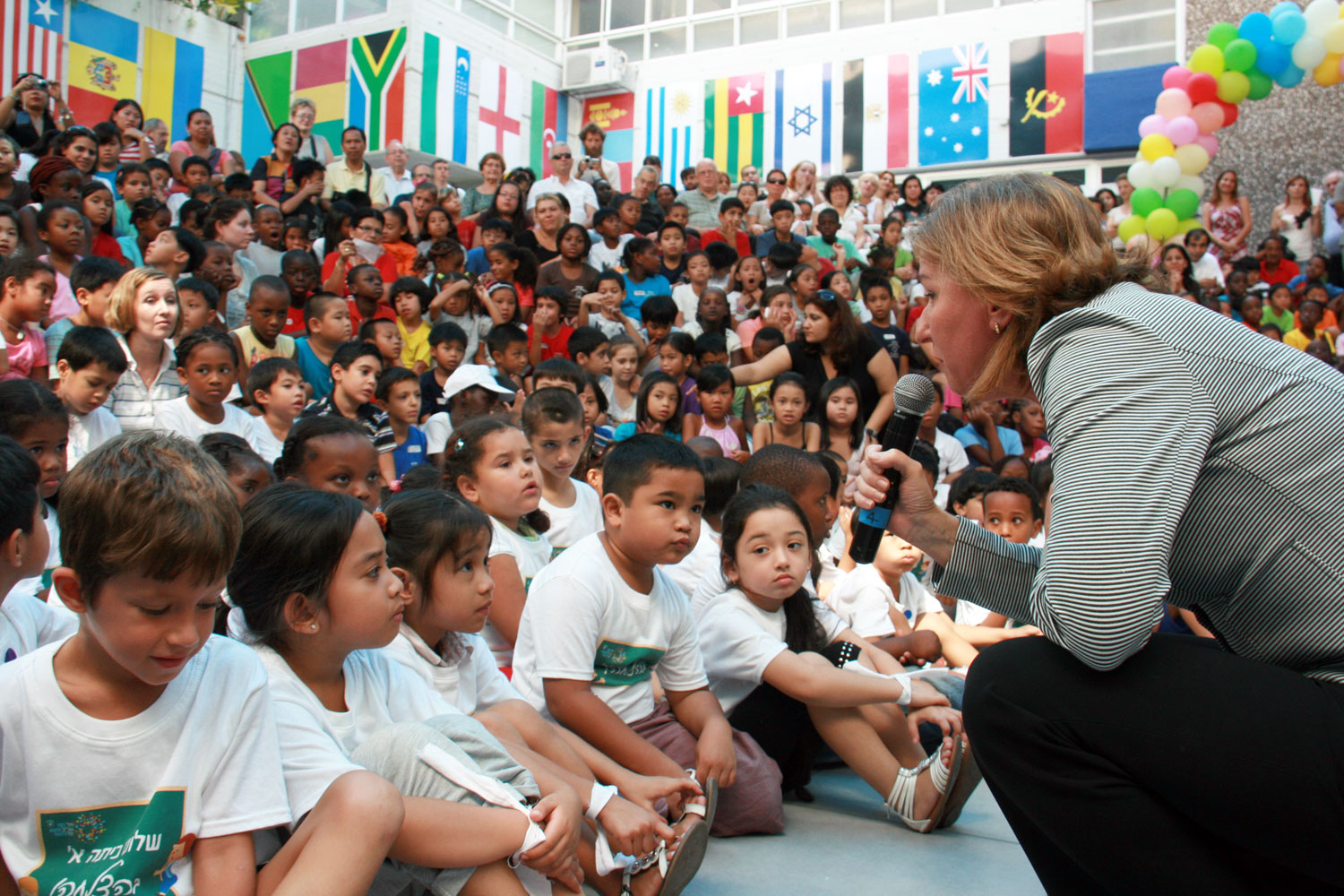
Tzipi Livni at Biyalik Rogazin

In December 2009, Livni travelled to Paris and met with French president Nicolas Sarkozy. "Time is against us," she told reporters following talks at the Elysee Palace that also touched on Iran. "We discussed the need to re-launch the peace process between Israel and the Palestinians, and I believe that this is part of Israel's interest to relaunch the negotiations from the point at which we stopped basically a year ago."

=== Criticism ===
During the 2008–2009 Israel–Gaza conflict, Livni was criticized by Arab League Chairman Amre Moussa who said that "I am greatly surprised by, and I reject, the words of the Israeli foreign minister (Livni), who asks: 'Is there a humanitarian crisis? There is no humanitarian crisis in Gaza'." Livni was quoted as saying "Israel has been supplying comprehensive humanitarian aid to the [Gaza] strip... and has even been stepping this up by the day." Israel would later allow a daily three-hour truce during the offensive to enable aid to flow through a humanitarian corridor. Livni declared that the 2009 Gaza military offensive had "restored Israel's deterrence. ... Hamas now understands that when you fire on its citizens it responds by going wild – and this is a good thing."

=== UK arrest warrants ===
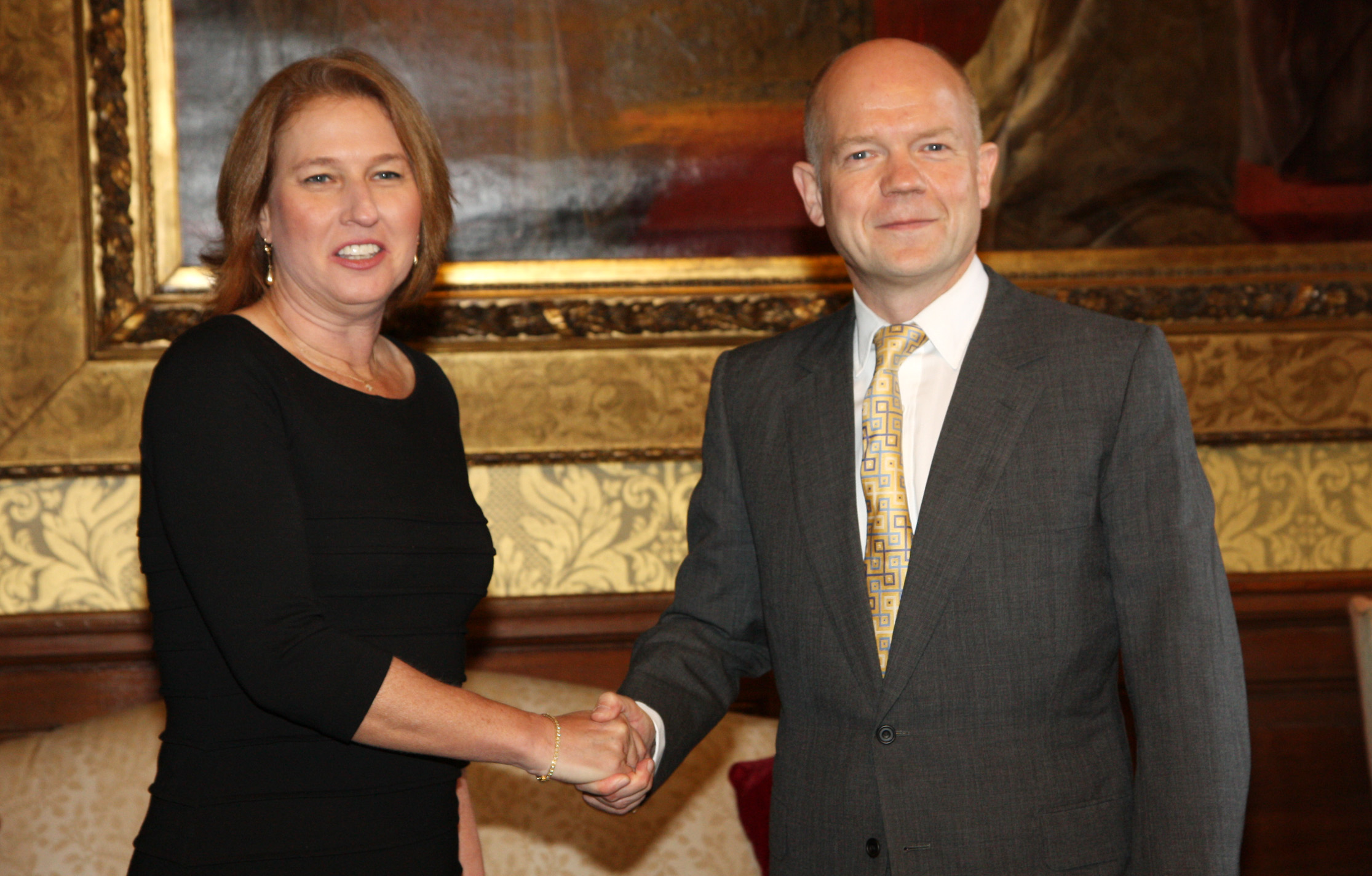
Livni and British Foreign Secretary William Hague

In December 2009, a warrant for Livni's arrest was understood to have been issued by a British court, following an application by lawyers acting for Palestinian victims of Operation Cast Lead. The warrant focused on Livni's role in Israel's war against Hamas-run Gaza earlier in the year, and was withdrawn after her visit was canceled. For several years, Palestinian activists have made largely unsuccessful attempts to prosecute Israeli officials in European courts under universal jurisdiction. The warrant was issued on 12 December and revoked on 14 December 2009, after it was revealed that Livni had not entered British territory.

The British Foreign Secretary, David Miliband, contacted Livni and his Israeli counterpart Avigdor Lieberman to formally explain the incident and apologize on behalf of the British government. Miliband had expressed concern at the situation and said officials were looking "urgently at ways in which the UK system might be changed in order to avoid this sort of situation arising again". Judges in the United Kingdom can issue arrest warrants for war crimes suspects around the world under the Geneva Conventions Act 1957 without any requirement to consult public prosecutors, which was something Miliband described as "unusual". J Street applauded Miliband's rejection of the warrant and "his promise to pursue a change in the law that would prevent unfortunate events like these from happening in the future." Prime Minister Gordon Brown expressed his regret over the warrant and spoke to Livni, reassuring her that she was "most welcome in Britain any time." Livni's office later stated that Brown promised to seek legislative changes to ensure no Israeli official would risk arrest while on British soil.

Yehuda Blum, Israel's former ambassador to the United Nations and a professor of law at Hebrew University of Jerusalem, commented: "The abuse and misuse of this concept of universal jurisdiction should be discontinued." Blum said the law was intended for use in cases with no clear jurisdiction, such as piracy in international waters, and should not be expanded for political aims. Israeli officials, acting under orders from Prime Minister Benjamin Netanyahu, told the British ambassador they expect quick action to change the law. Livni called the arrest warrant "an abuse of the British legal system".

In 2011, private groups asked the Crown Prosecution Service to issue an arrest warrant against Livni under universal jurisdiction because of her alleged role in Israeli military action against Gaza in December 2008. Sir Keir Starmer, Director of Public Prosecutions for England and Wales, blocked the issue of an arrest warrant.

=== Leadership defeat and resignation ===
In November 2011, the three candidates opposed to Tzipi Livni in 2008 called for a primary to be held as soon as possible, citing the probability of Knesset elections soon. On 19 January 2012, Livni set the primary date for 27 March 2012. Livni lost by a wide margin (64.5% to her 35.5%) to challenger and former defense minister Shaul Mofaz. In May 2012, despite Mofaz's appeal for her to remain in the party, Livni resigned from the Knesset. She stated that although she was leaving the Knesset, she was not retiring from public life, as Israel was "too dear" to her. Commenting on decisions she made, which may have contributed to her loss, she stated "I am not sorry for not backing down in the face of political blackmail—even when the price was being in the government—and for not willing to sell the country to the ultra-Orthodox," adding "And I'm definitely not sorry for the main issue I promoted. Even if the Israeli–Palestinian conflict isn't in vogue right now, there's an urgent need to reach a permanent agreement with the Palestinians as well as with the Arab world."

== 2012–2014: Hatnua ==
=== 2013 elections ===
On 27 November 2012, Livni announced the establishment of a new party, called Hatnua ("The Movement"). She was joined by seven members of Knesset from the Kadima Party: Yoel Hasson, Robert Tiviaev, Majalli Wahabi, Orit Zuaretz, Rachel Adato, Shlomo Molla and Meir Sheetrit as well as former Labor Party leaders Amram Mitzna and Amir Peretz.

=== Minister of Justice ===
Following the 2013 elections, in which Hatnua won six seats in the Knesset, Livni did not recommend any candidate for prime minister to President Peres. After other party leaders endorsed Netanyahu, Livni led Hatnua in being the first of several parties to agree to join a new coalition under Prime Minister Benjamin Netanyahu, forming the thirty-third government of Israel. According to the coalition agreement negotiated between Hatnua and Likud, Livni was appointed justice minister, as well as chief negotiator with the Palestinian Authority. As environmental issues constituted a central plank in Hatnua's platform, Livni required her party be given the environmental protection ministry, to which she appointed Amir Peretz. Fulfilling her constitutional duty as justice minister, Livni served as chairwoman of the powerful Ministerial Committee on Legislation. Given her clout and experience with Western leaders, Netanyahu unofficially charged Livni with overseeing Israel's diplomatic relations with the United States and Europe, with Foreign Minister Avigdor Liberman playing a lesser role.

=== 2013–14 Israeli–Palestinian peace talks ===
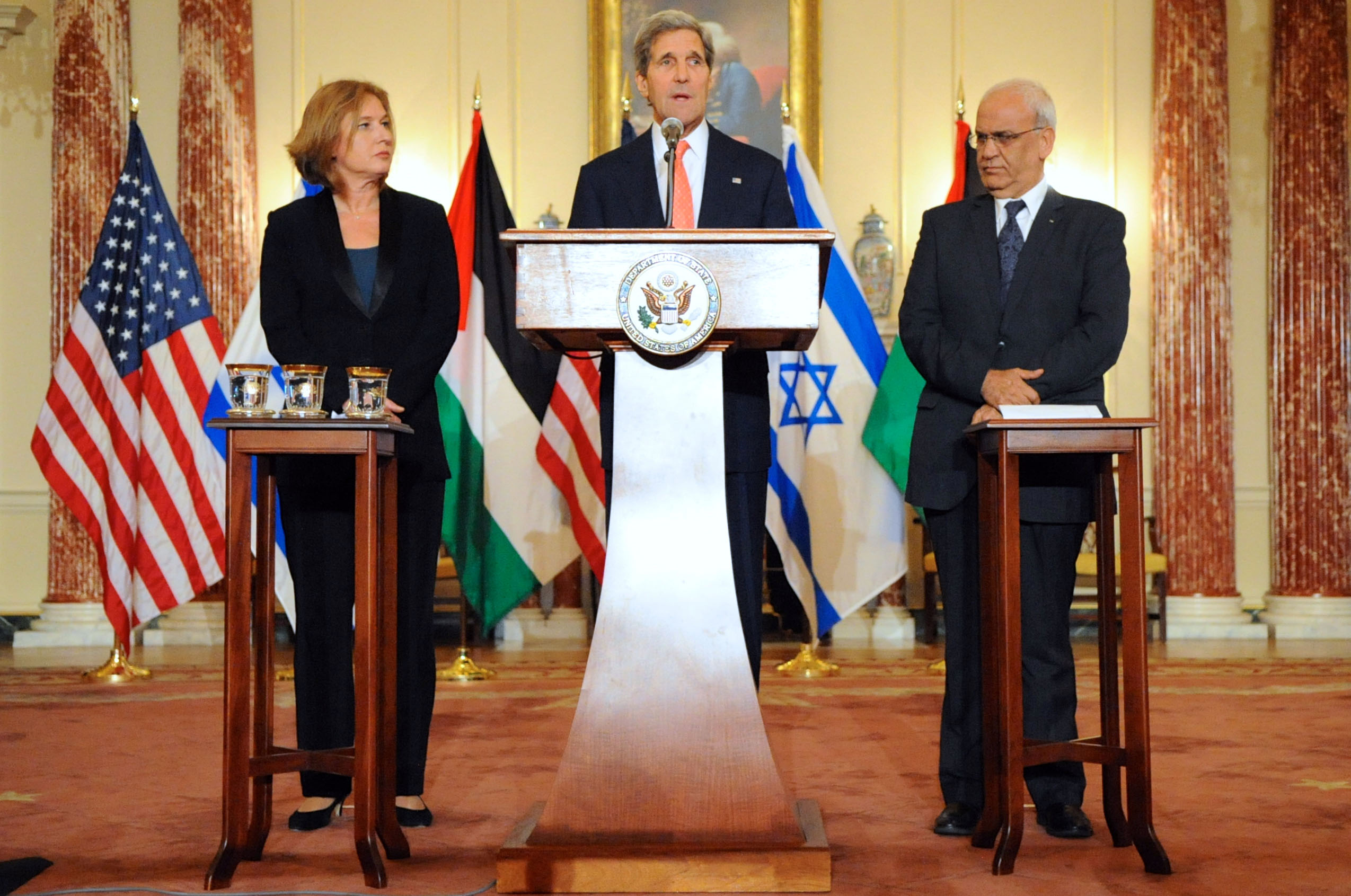
Livni, U.S. Secretary of State John Kerry, and Palestinian negotiator Saeb Erekat announce the resumption of peace talks

Livni led the Israeli negotiation team in the peace talks, brokered by U.S. Secretary of State John Kerry and Middle East envoy Martin Indyk from July 2013 until April 2014. Upon announcing the resumption of talks between Israel and the Palestinians at a press conference delivered at the U.S. State Department, Livni criticized the "cynicism and pessimism" surrounding Israeli–Palestinian peace process, and expressed hope that the negotiators would do everything in their power to transform a "spark of hope into something real and lasting." In concluding remarks praised for their poignancy, she said, "I believe that history is not made by cynics. It is made by realists who are not afraid to dream. And let us be these people." The process collapsed in April 2014 when internal political difficulties prevented Israel from releasing a promised fourth tranche of pre-Oslo prisoners and the Palestinians reacted by acceding to several international treaties. Indyk cited Israel's settlement policy during the talks as a critical factor leading to the collapse.

=== Dismissal ===
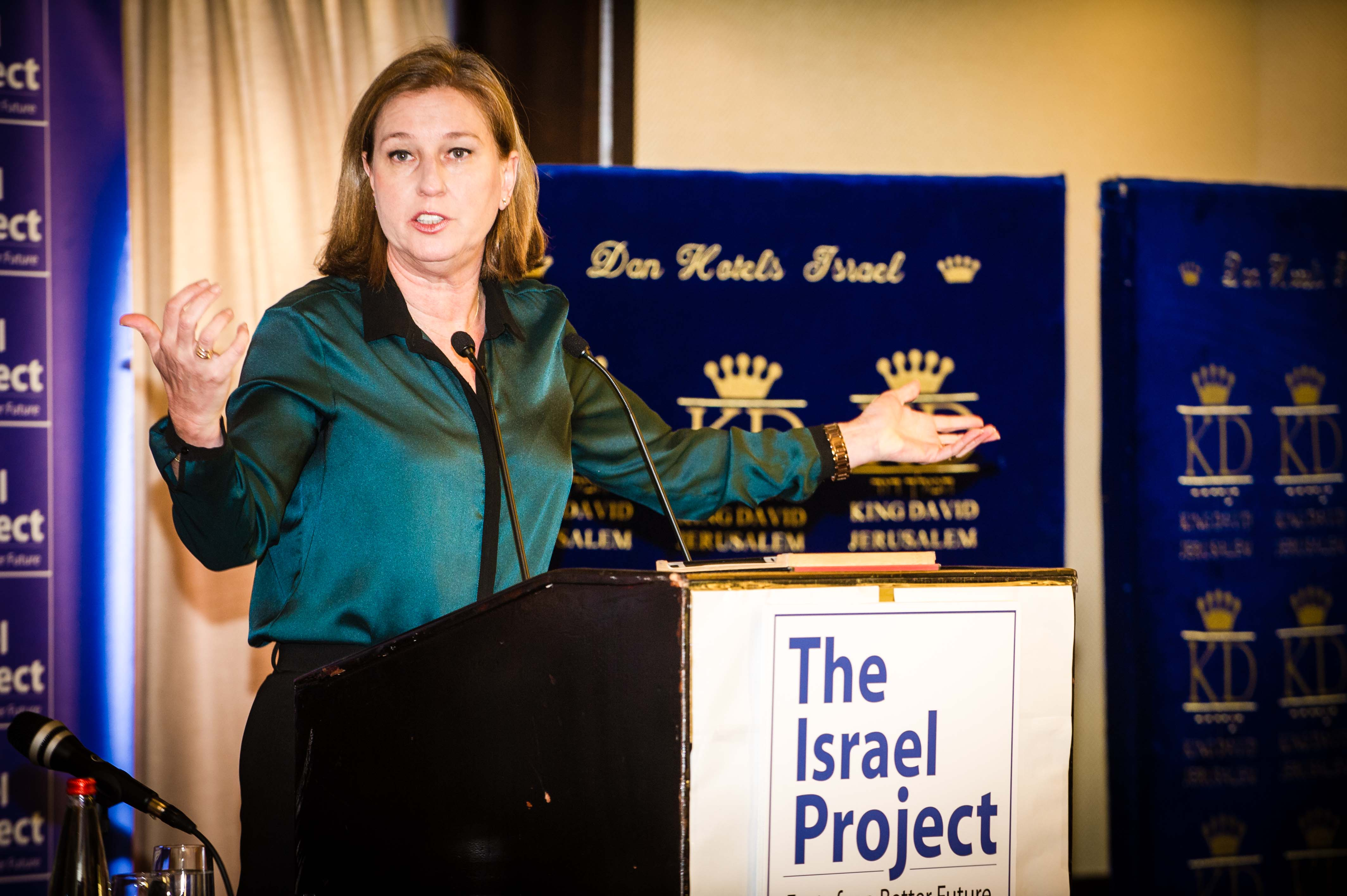
Livni briefs The Israel Project

Livni continued on as justice minister until 2 December 2014, when a coalition crisis over multiple policy disagreements boiled over, and Netanyahu fired Livni along with Finance Minister Yair Lapid from their posts, accusing the two of plotting to overthrow the government. Livni and Lapid had often criticized government decisions, which Netanyahu claimed amounted to an "opposition within the coalition," and made it "impossible to govern." A particular source of frustration for Netanyahu was Livni's control of the powerful ministerial committee on legislation.

In late December 2014, Secretary of State John Kerry told European Union ambassadors that his stance against a unilateral Palestinian measure at the UN Security Council was influenced by his talks with Livni and former president Shimon Peres, who said such a move could serve the political interests of those opposing the peace process such as Netanyahu and Naftali Bennet.

== 2014–2019: The Zionist Union ==
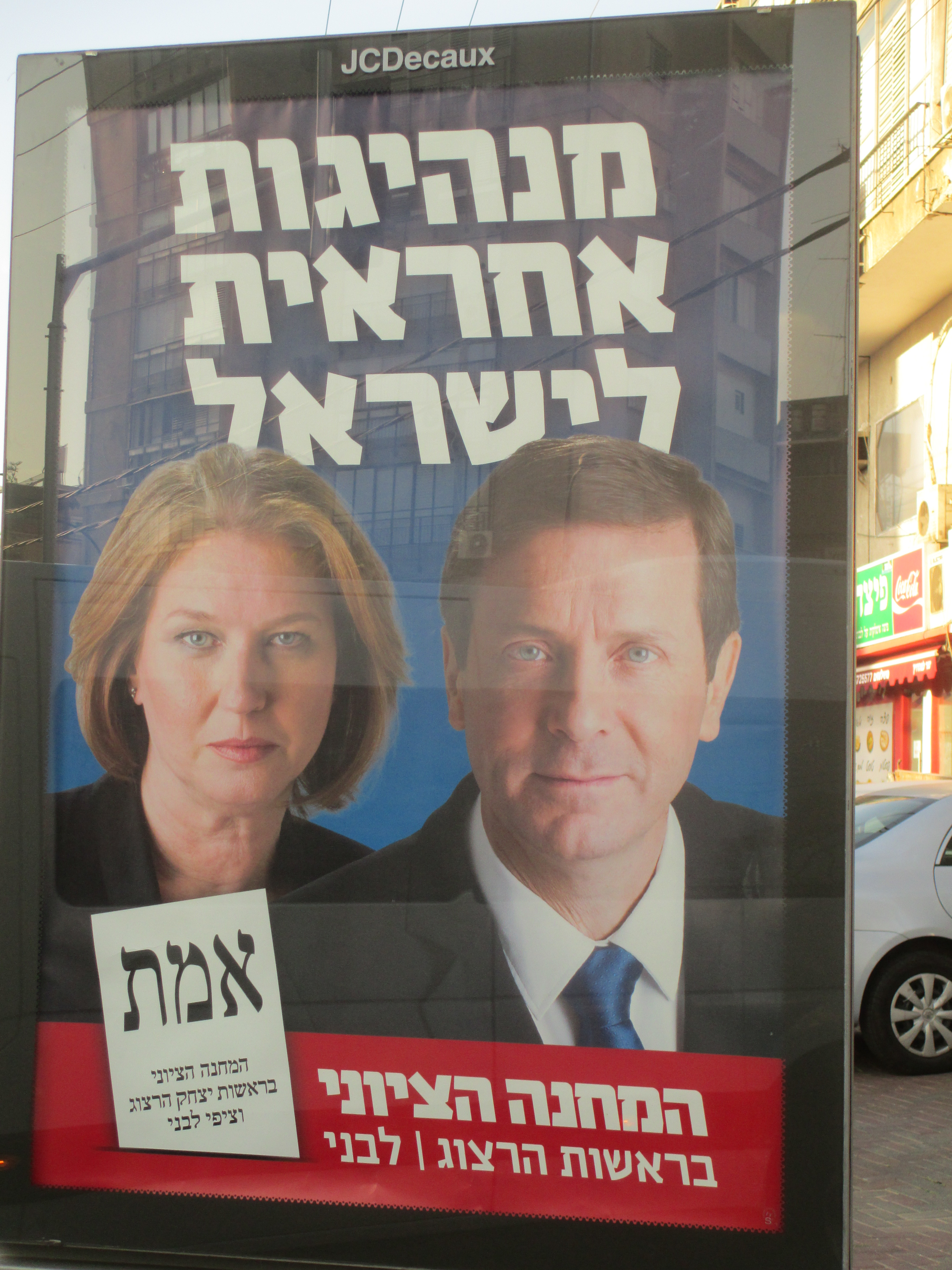
Zionist Union campaign poster

=== 2015 elections ===
After the dissolution of the Knesset in December 2014, Labor leader Isaac Herzog and Livni announced a joint slate between Labor and Hatnua, called the Zionist Union, to contest the 2015 elections in an effort to keep Netanyahu, leader of the Likud Party, from securing a fourth term as prime minister. They proposed to share the role of prime minister (an arrangement known in the Knesset as rotation) if they won enough votes, though Livni also stated she would step back if her participation presented a hurdle to coalition building. The partnership between Livni and Herzog created significant momentum and galvanized Israel's center-left voters who saw the partnership as having a realistic chance to defeat Netanyahu and form a government.

Many opinion polls during the campaign showed Likud and the Zionist Union in dead heat, and the few weeks leading up to the elections suggested Livni and Herzog had overtaken Netanyahu, and would emerge with a plurality of voters. Initial exit polls indicated that the combined parties had won 27 seats, but the final count showed the Zionist Union garnering only 24 to Likud's 30. Following the elections, Livni and the Zionist Union went into opposition.

=== Leader of the Opposition ===
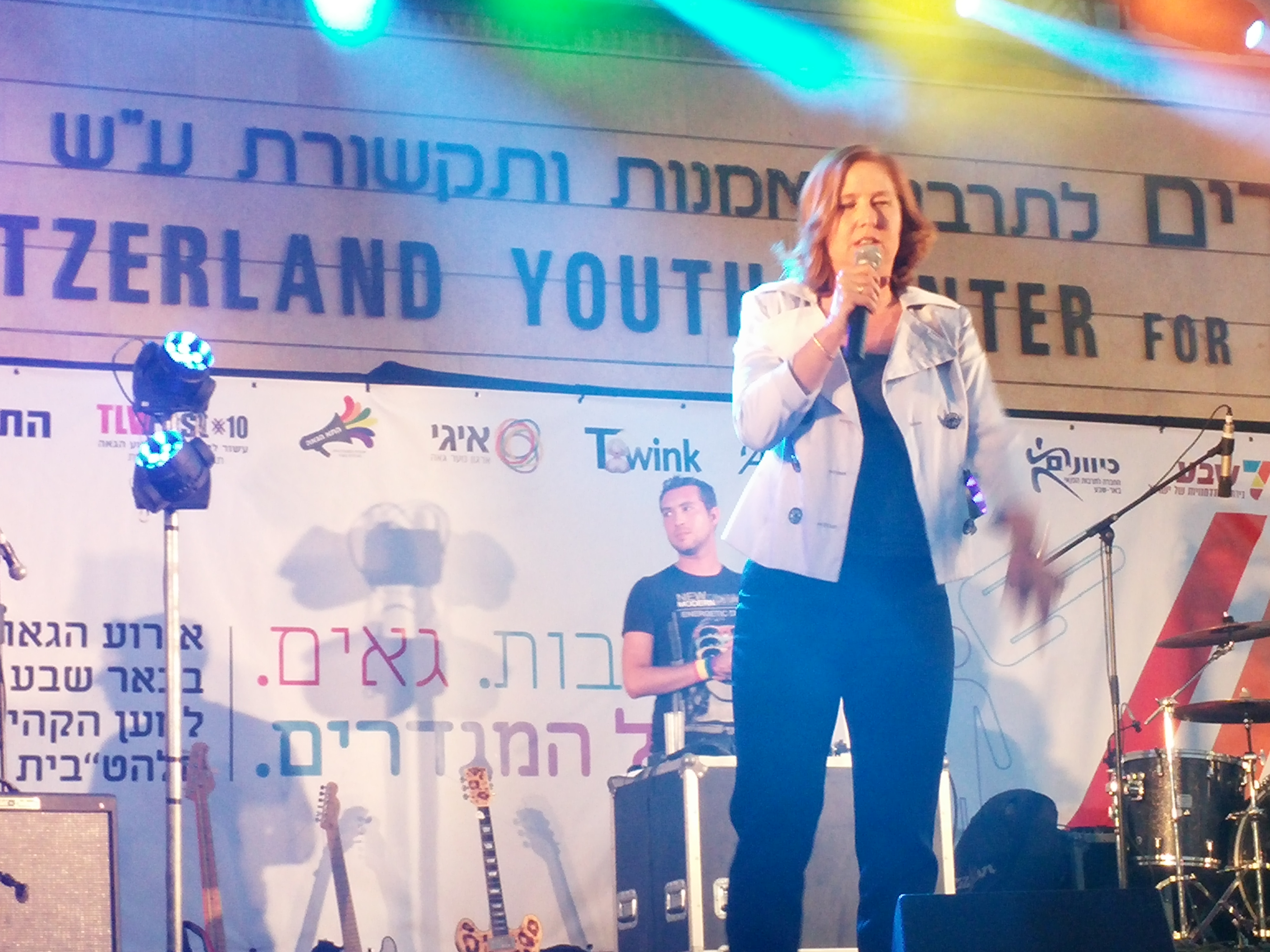
Livni at a 2015 LGBTQ pride event in Be'er Sheva

Livni served as a member of the Knesset Foreign Affairs and Defense Committee, the Constitution, Law and Justice Committee. In August 2015, in response to the submission of a motion to raise the Palestinian flag at the UN headquarters, Livni initiated the creation of the Foreign Affairs and Defense Subcommittee on International Lawfare, which she chaired. At the committee's inaugural meeting, Livni characterized the Palestinian motion as "part of an orchestrated diplomatic and legal struggle that is meant to create legitimacy for a Palestinian state with all that that means, and to deny legitimacy to the State of Israel." She argued that despite the lack of attention it receives, "[lawfare] is a war front as any other." The committee's mandate, according to Livni, is to "deal with lawfare not only to see how we can defend ourselves, but also to try to change international trends against Israel in a legal context and how to deal with moves the Palestinians are trying to make over Israel's head."

On 11 February 2017, it was reported that UN Secretary-General António Guterres had offered Livni the post of Under-Secretary-General of the United Nations, although this never materialized.

=== Split and resignation ===
On 1 January 2019 at a televised Zionist Union party meeting, Labor leader Avi Gabay announced that Labor would not run with Hatnua in the April 2019 Israeli legislative election, surprising Livni. Electoral polls showed that Hatnua was not close to crossing the 3.25% electoral threshold, and Livni announced her retirement from politics on 18 February 2019 as well as Hatnua's withdrawal from the election so as not to split the center-left vote.

== Post-Knesset career ==
Following her retirement from the Knesset in 2019, Livni was appointed as a Fisher Family Fellow at the Harvard Kennedy School's Belfer Center for Science and International Affairs. She was also appointed to the board of directors for the Institute for National Security Studies (INSS) and as a trustee of the International Crisis Group.

Livni lauded Joe Biden's victory over Donald Trump in the 2020 United States presidential election, stating that Biden is committed to democratic principles and that his election is "a blessing" for the United States, Israel, and the rest of the free world.

In a May 2024 interview, Livni called on the Israeli government to plan for the postwar governance of Gaza after the resolution of the Gaza war and warned that delays in engaging with Arab partners such as the Palestinian Authority, Egypt, the UAE, and Saudi Arabia could be a costly mistake.

On 11 July 2024, The Jerusalem Post reported that Yair Golan, leader of the newly formed Democrats party, was considering appointing Livni to the second position in the new party's electoral list.

On 9 December 2024, days after a synagogue attack in Melbourne, Livni spoke at the Mount Scopus Foundation gala in the city. She affirmed her support for Israel to cooperate with regional partners regarding postwar Gaza and rejected proposals for resettlement, believing it is "against the interest of Israel". About a potential return to politics, she stated that "for me, politics is not the place to be", but that she will continue to "speak up for [her] beliefs" and "hope that it makes a difference".

== Awards and honors ==
- 2004: Knight of Quality Government Award
- 2004: Abirat Ha-Shilton ("Quality of Governance") award.
- 2009: Honored by Yale University as a Chubb Fellow.
- 2009: International Hall of Fame Award from the International Women's Forum.
- 2018: Golden Arrow Award

== Affiliations ==
- A board member of the International Crisis Group
- A member of The Aspen Ministers Forum
- A member of the international group of leaders who wrote the Declaration of Principles for Freedom Prosperity and Peace.
- Senior fellow at Harvard Kennedy School
- Global steering committee of "Campaign for nature" (founded by Wyss Foundation)

Political offices
Preceded by Shimon Peres	Minister of Regional Cooperation; 2001	Succeeded by Roni Milo
Preceded by Shalom Simhon	Minister of Agriculture; 2002–2003	Succeeded by Yisrael Katz
Preceded by Ariel Sharon	Minister of Immigrant Absorption; 2003–2006	Succeeded by Ze'ev Boim
Preceded by Effi Eitam	Minister of Housing and Construction; 2004–2005	Succeeded by Isaac Herzog
Preceded by Tommy Lapid	Minister of Justice; 2004–2006	Succeeded by Haim Ramon
Preceded by Meir Sheetrit; Acting	Minister of Justice; 2006–2007	Succeeded by Daniel Friedmann
Preceded by Silvan Shalom	Minister of Foreign Affairs; 2006–2009	Succeeded by Avigdor Lieberman
Preceded by Ehud Olmert	Vice Prime Minister; 2006–2009	Succeeded by Vacant
Preceded by Benjamin Netanyahu	Leader of the Opposition; 2009–2012	Succeeded by Shaul Mofaz
Preceded by Yaakov Neeman	Minister of Justice; 2013–2014	Succeeded by Ayelet Shaked
Preceded by Isaac Herzog	Leader of the Opposition; 2018	Succeeded by Shelly Yachimovich
Party political offices
Preceded by Ehud Olmert	Leader of Kadima; 2008–2012	Succeeded by Shaul Mofaz
New office	Leader of Hatnua; 2012–2019	Incumbent
New office	Co-leader of the Zionist Union; 2014–2019	Office abolished
