= Thirty-second government of Israel =

2009–13 government led by Benjamin Netanyahu

Second Netanyahu cabinet
- 32nd Cabinet of Israel

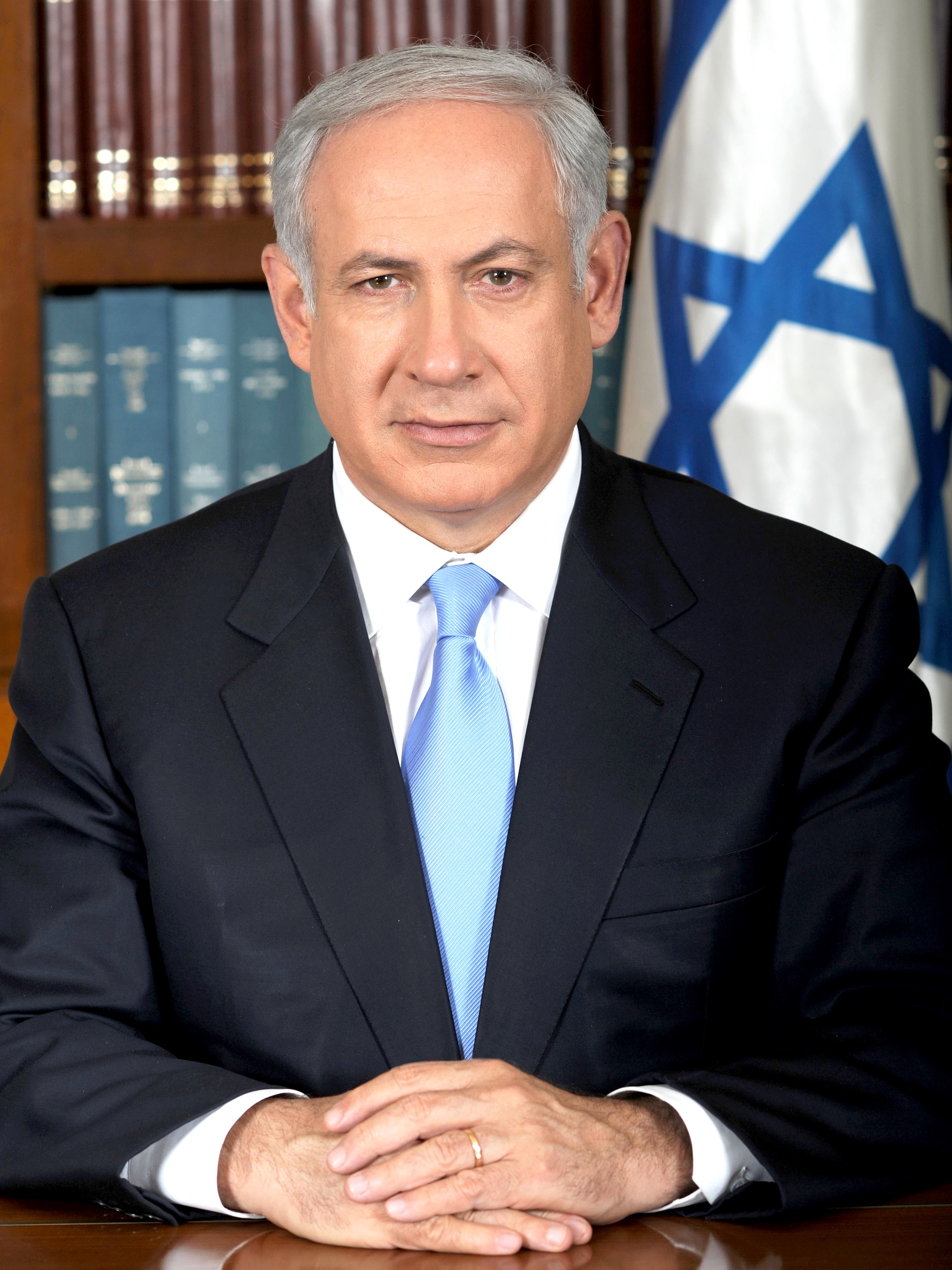
- Date formed: 31 March 2009
- Date dissolved: 18 March 2013

People and organisations
- Head of state: Shimon Peres
- Head of government: Benjamin Netanyahu
- Deputy head of government: Silvan Shalom; Moshe Ya'alon; Ehud Barak; Avigdor Lieberman; Dan Meridor; Eli Yishai; Shaul Mofaz (from 8 May 2012 to 17 July 2012)
- Member party: Likud; Yisrael Beiteinu; Shas; Labor (until 17 January 2011); The Jewish Home; Independence (from 17 January 2011); United Torah Judaism (from 1 April 2009); Kadima (from 8 May 2012 to 17 July 2012)
- Status in legislature: Grand Coalition (2009–2011); Centre-right (2011–2013)
- Opposition party: Kadima
- Opposition leader: Shaul Mofaz

History
- Election: Knesset elections, 2009
- Legislature term: 18th Knesset
- Predecessor: 31st
- Successor: 33rd

The thirty-second government of Israel, also known as the Second Netanyahu Government, was the largest cabinet in the country's history, in terms of the number of ministers: initially containing 30 ministers and nine deputy ministers, it later added another deputy prime minister as of May 2012 until he resigned in July 2012.

== Formation ==
=== Recommendations ===
After consulting with the political parties for recommendation for prime minister, president Shimon Peres tasked Likud leader Benjamin Netanyahu for the formation of a new government.

The results of the consultations for recommendations were as follows:

Party	Party leader	Seats	Recommended
Kadima	Tzipi Livni	28	Livni
Likud–Ahi	Benjamin Netanyahu	27	Netanyahu
Yisrael Beiteinu	Avigdor Lieberman	15	Netanyahu
Labor	Ehud Barak	13	No one
Shas	Eli Yishai	11	Netanyahu
United Torah Judaism	Yaakov Litzman	5	Netanyahu
Ra'am–Ta'al	Ibrahim Sarsur	4	No one
National Union	Ya'akov Katz	4	Netanyahu
Hadash	Mohammad Barakeh	4	No one
Meretz	Haim Oron	3	No one
Jewish Home	Daniel Hershkowitz	3	Netanyahu
Balad	Jamal Zahalka	3	No one
Benjamin Netanyahu		65	54.2%
Tzipi Livni		28	23.3%

Israeli government formation, February–March 2009
- 20 February–31 March 2009
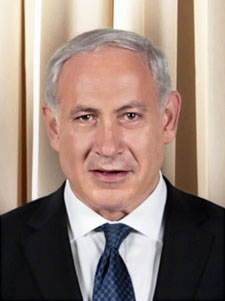

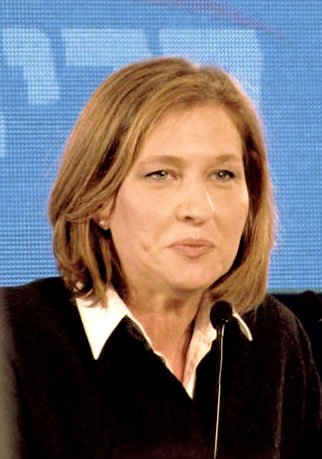
Nominee	Benjamin Netanyahu	Tzipi Livni
Party	Likud	Kadima
Electoral vote	65	28
Percentage	54.2%	23.3%
Investiture (For)	69
Investiture (Against)	45
Prime Minister before election
Ehud Olmert
Kadima
Elected Prime Minister
Benjamin Netanyahu
Likud

=== Composition ===
On 31 March 2009, a new grand coalition government was formed consisting of Likud, Yisrael Beiteinu, Shas, Labor and Jewish Home, which accounts for 69 seats in the 18th Knesset. The next day, United Torah Judaism also joined the coalition after accepting a compromise agreement with Yisrael Beiteinu regarding religious conversions, increasing the coalition to 74 seats.

In January 2011, Labor leader Ehud Barak formed a breakaway party, Independence, which allowed him and his loyal MKs to remain in government and prevent the entire Labor party from leaving the coalition. After the party split, the coalition maintained a majority of 66 seats.

On 8 May 2012, after speculations of government collapse and an early election, Netanyahu announced a unity government with Kadima after striking a deal with party leader Shaul Mofaz, which increased the coalition to 94 seats in parliament. This only lasted for two months until 17 July, when Kadima left the coalition due to disagreements over the Tal Law.

On 16 October 2012, the 18th Knesset voted to dissolve itself, leading to the 2013 election. The government ended on 18 March 2013 with the formation of the 33rd government.

Date	Likud	Yisrael Beiteinu	Shas	UTJ	Jewish Home	Labor	Indep.	Kadima	Knesset seats
31 March 2009	Yes	Yes	Yes	No	Yes	Yes		No	69
1 April 2009 (Note: United Torah Judaism joins coalition)	Yes	Yes	Yes	Yes	Yes	Yes		No	74
17 January 2011 (Note: Independence splits from Labor, with Labor leaving coalition and Independence remaining)	Yes	Yes	Yes	Yes	Yes	No	Yes	No	66
8 May 2012 (Note: Kadima joins coalition)	Yes	Yes	Yes	Yes	Yes	No	Yes	Yes	94
17 July 2012 (Note: Kadima leaves coalition)	Yes	Yes	Yes	Yes	Yes	No	Yes	No	66

== Basic policy guidelines ==
A paper presented to the Knesset's approval alongside the Government said that the Government would:

- actively seek to fortify the national security and bestow personal security on its citizens while vigorously and determinedly fighting against violence and terror.
- advance the political process and act to promote peace with all our neighbors, while preserving the security, historic and national interests of Israel.
- advance a program to deal with the economic crisis and act to create economic conditions that will allow for sustainable growth, as well as create and maintain jobs in the economy.
- strive for social justice by reducing social gaps and uncompromisingly fight against poverty through education, employment and an increase in assistance to the weaker segments of the population.
- place the issue of immigration and immigrant absorption at the top of its list of priorities and will work vigorously to increase immigration from all countries of the world.
- place education at the center of its list of national priorities and will act to advance reforms in the education system.
- preserve the Jewish character of the State and the legacy of Israel, as well as honor the religions and traditions of members of other religions in the country in accordance with the values of the Declaration of Independence.
- act to advance governmental reforms to improve stability and governability.
- act to fortify the rule of law in Israel.
- act to protect the environment in Israel, improve the quality of life for the residents of the country and increase Israel's participation in contributing to the global effort with regard to the climate and the environment.

== Cabinet members ==
The cabinet had 30 members.

Portfolio	Minister	Party
Prime Minister; Minister of Economic Strategy; Minister of Health; Minister of Pensioner Affairs	Benjamin Netanyahu	Likud
Vice Prime Minister; Minister of Development of the Negev and Galilee; Minister of Regional Development	Silvan Shalom	Likud
Vice Prime Minister; Minister of Strategic Affairs	Moshe Ya'alon	Likud
Vice Prime Minister; Minister without Portfolio	Shaul Mofaz (Note: Mofaz held post from 9 May 2012 to 19 July 2012)	Kadima
Deputy Prime Minister; Minister of Defense	Ehud Barak (Note: Ehud Barak switched party from Labor to Independence on 17 January 2011)	Labor
Deputy Prime Minister; Minister of Defense	Ehud Barak	Independence
Deputy Prime Minister	Avigdor Lieberman (Note: Lieberman held post until 18 December 2012)	Yisrael Beiteinu
Minister of Foreign Affairs	Avigdor Lieberman	Yisrael Beiteinu
Minister of Foreign Affairs	Benjamin Netanyahu	Likud
Deputy Prime Minister; Minister of Intelligence and Atomic Energy	Dan Meridor	Likud
Deputy Prime Minister; Minister of Internal Affairs	Eli Yishai	Shas
Minister of Agriculture and Rural Development	Shalom Simhon (Note: Noked replaced Simhon on 19 January 2011)	Labor
Minister of Agriculture and Rural Development	Orit Noked	Independence
Minister of Communications	Moshe Kahlon	Likud
Minister of Culture and Sport	Limor Livnat	Likud
Minister of Education	Gideon Sa'ar	Likud
Minister of Energy and Water	Uzi Landau	Yisrael Beiteinu
Minister of Environmental Protection	Gilad Erdan	Likud
Minister of Finance	Yuval Steinitz	Likud
Minister for Home Front Defense	Matan Vilnai (Note: Vilnai switched parties from Labor to Independence (Israeli political party) on 17 January 2011) (Note: Dichter replaced Vilnai on 15 August 2012)	Labor
Minister for Home Front Defense	Matan Vilnai	Independence
Minister for Home Front Defense	Avi Dichter	Independent (ex-Kadima)
Minister of Housing and Construction	Ariel Atias	Shas
Minister of Immigrant Absorption	Sofa Landver	Yisrael Beiteinu
Minister of Improvement of Government Services	Michael Eitan	Likud
Minister of Industry, Trade, and Labour; Minister of Minorities	Binyamin Ben-Eliezer (Note: Simhon replaced Ben-Eliezer on 19 January 2011)	Labor
Minister of Industry, Trade, and Labour; Minister of Minorities	Shalom Simhon	Independence
Minister of Information and Diaspora	Yuli Edelstein	Likud
Minister of Internal Security	Yitzhak Aharonovich	Yisrael Beiteinu
Minister of Justice	Ya'akov Ne'eman	Independent
Minister of Religious Services	Ya'akov Margi	Shas
Minister of Science and Technology	Daniel Hershkowitz	Jewish Home
Minister of Tourism	Stas Misezhnikov	Yisrael Beiteinu
Minister of Transportation, National Infrastructure and Road Safety	Israel Katz	Likud
Minister of Welfare and Social Services	Isaac Herzog (Note: Kahlon replaced Herzog on 19 January 2011)	Labor
Minister of Welfare and Social Services	Moshe Kahlon	Likud
Minister without Portfolio	Benny Begin	Likud
Minister without Portfolio	Meshulam Nahari	Shas
Minister without Portfolio	Yossi Peled (Note: Peled held post until 29 September 2012)	Likud

=== Deputy Ministers ===
Portfolio	Minister	Party
Deputy Minister of the Development of the Negev and Galilee	Ayoob Kara	Likud
Deputy Minister of Education	Meir Porush	United Torah Judaism
Deputy Minister of Finance	Yitzhak Cohen	Shas
Deputy Minister of Foreign Affairs	Daniel Ayalon	Yisrael Beiteinu
Deputy Minister of Health	Yaakov Litzman	United Torah Judaism
Deputy Minister of Pensioner Affairs	Lea Nass	Likud
Deputy Minister in the Prime Minister's Office	Gila Gamliel	Likud
Deputy Minister of Education	Meir Porush (Note: Moses replaced Porush on 6-9 February 2011)	United Torah Judaism
Deputy Minister of Education	Menachem Eliezer Moses	United Torah Judaism
Deputy Minister of Industry, Trade, and Labor	Orit Noked (Note: Noked held post until 19 January 2011)	Labor
