= Independence (Israeli political party) =

Israeli political party (2011–2012)

Independence סיעת העצמאות
- Chairman: Ehud Barak
- Founded: 17 January 2011
- Dissolved: December 2012
- Split from: Labor Party
- Ideology: Social liberalism Third Way; Liberal Zionism
- Political position: Centre to centre-left
- International affiliation: Liberal International
- Most MKs: 5 (2011)

Website
- haatzmaut.org.il

Independence (Hebrew: העצמאות, Ha'Atzma'ut) was a political party in Israel, that was launched by Defense Minister Ehud Barak on 17 January 2011, after he and four other Labor Party MKs seceded from the caucus. Upon secession, the faction stated that it aimed to establish itself as a separate "centrist, Zionist, and democratic" political party. It was founded on the vestiges of the Third Way party. Nine days after Barak announced his retirement from politics, it was made public that Independence would not take part in the 2013 Knesset elections.

== History ==
The secession was seen as a preemptive move before other Labor MKs acted on their ultimatum to either let Labor leave Benjamin Netanyahu's coalition due to the stalling of a peace process or force Labor's then-chairman Barak to face the consequences within his own party. Splitting the Labor Party enabled Barak to keep a faction of Labor MKs loyal to him within Netanyahu's coalition, preventing the departure of all 13 Labor MKs from the coalition. As of 17 January 2011, the coalition had the support of 66 out of 120 MKs, as compared to 74 prior to that. Since Labor was often an unreliable coalition partner in Knesset voting, the reduced number of MKs did not increase the risk of a no-confidence vote. Netanyahu was singled out by analysts as the biggest winner from the split, and was reported to have been involved in the behind-the-scenes making of the political deal. Barak said that he was tired of infighting within Labor as he accused the rest of the Labor of "moving too far to the dovish end of the political spectrum." The more leftist faction was also wary of Barak's closeness to the Prime Minister Netanyahu. Daniel Ben-Simon left the Labor party in protest against Barak's decision to stay with the government.

MK Einat Wilf mentioned in the press conference: "Not all is our fault, some of it is the Palestinians' fault", referring to the argument leading up to the departure of Independence from the Labor Party. Wilf also said that the party could not stay united because one faction was moving towards the "far left of Israeli politics," and the other side believed the current government was an effective partnership. However, the remaining members of Labor condemned the move. Eitan Cabel said it would "destroy the party,” whilst Shelly Yachimovich called it "a corrupt and opportunistic move, designed to save Barak's seat in the government. He has brought a catastrophe upon Labor." Daniel Ben-Simon had stated prior to the split that he would become an independent MK because of Labor's continued position in the government of Prime Minister Benjamin Netanyahu. Avishai Braverman, Minister of Minorities, and Isaac Herzog, Minister of Social Affairs, also intended to resign following the split.

In a move to avoid the months of bureaucracy involved in registering a new party, Barak negotiated a takeover of the Third Way with its leader Avigdor Kahalani. The Third Way had held seats in the Knesset between 1996 and 1999, and although had effectively ceased functioning after losing them in the 1999 elections, it had remained a registered party. The Knesset Committee approved the request of Independence to take over the Third Way party, a decision needed for it to receive funding from the state.

The founding conference of the party was held in May 2011 with eighty members in attendance. The conference approved the party's statute and the appointment of Barak as chairman. In September 2011 the faction's name was officially changed to "The Independence Party" through the national party registrar. In February 2012, Minister Matan Vilnai resigned his post in the cabinet and the Knesset in order to become the Israeli Ambassador to China, and Shachiv Shnaan was sworn in instead.

== Government representation ==
A day after the party's formation, four of its five Knesset members were given ministerial positions; Barak remained Minister of Defence, Vilnai was given the new post of Minister for the Home Front, Noked became Minister of Agriculture and Simhon became Minister of Industry, Trade and Labor and Minister of Minorities without their party having the benefit of having participating in an election.

== Knesset members ==
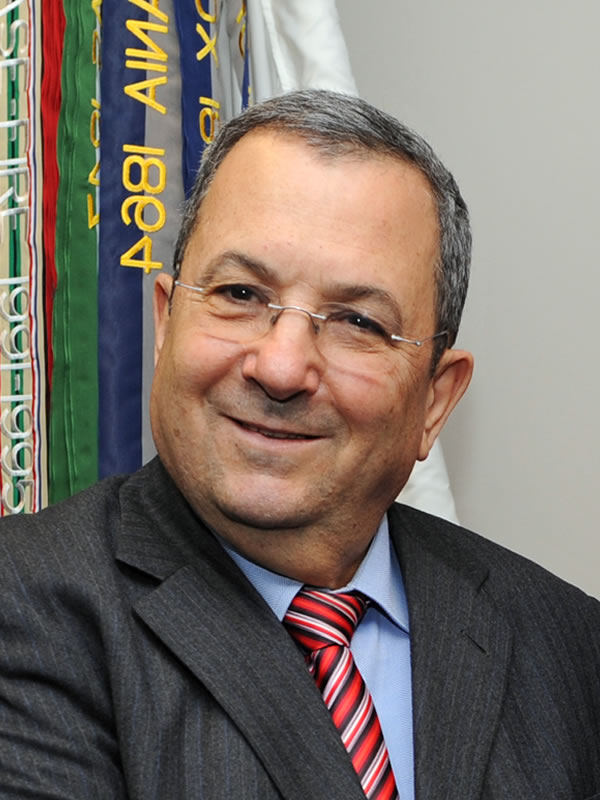
Party founder Ehud Barak

Six people represented the party in the Knesset:

- Ehud Barak
- Matan Vilnai – resigned and replaced by Shachiv Shnaan
- Shalom Simhon
- Orit Noked
- Einat Wilf
