= Dedi Simchi =

Former Israeli military officer and head of fire services

- דדי שמחי
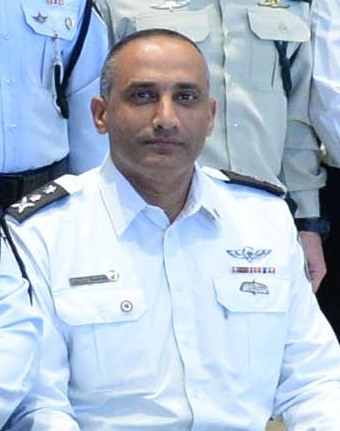
- Simchi in 2018
- Born: 25 March 1965 (age 61); Hodiya, Israel
- Education: Bar-Ilan University (BA, MBA)
- Military career
- Allegiance: Israel
- Branch: Israel Defense Forces; Israel Fire and Rescue Services
- Service years: 1983–2016 (IDF); 2017–2022 (Fire and Rescue)
- Rank: Brigadier general
- Conflicts: Arab–Israeli conflict; Israeli–Lebanese conflict; South Lebanon conflict (1985–2000); 2006 Lebanon War; Israeli–Palestinian conflict; First Intifada; Second Intifada; Operation Cast Lead; Operation Protective Edge

Dedi Simchi (Hebrew: דדי שמחי), also transliterated as Dedi Simhi, is an Israeli military officer with the rank of Brigadier General in the Israel Defense Forces. He also served in the Israel Fire and Rescue Services and in Home Front Command.

== Early life ==
Dedi Simchi was born in Hodiya to Shalom and Nurit, who are of Yemeni Jewish descent. He studied at Mae Boyar High School in Jerusalem, and served as chairman of the student council. Simchi holds a bachelor's degree in economics and political science and a master of business administration from Bar-Ilan University.

== Career ==
=== Israel Defense Forces ===
In 1983, Simchi enlisted in the Israel Defense Forces and served for five years in the Golani Brigade. In 1992, he was appointed as deputy battalion commander in the Nahal Brigade. During the Western Wall Tunnel riots in 1996, Simchi was deputy commander of the Haruv Battalion in the Kfir Brigade, then became battalion commander that same year. After being promoted to lieutenant colonel, Simchi served as the commander of the Arava Brigade, then the Southern District of Home Front Command. In 2008, he was appointed as commander of Bahad 16. During Operation Cast Lead, he was commander of the Sderot region and the Gaza Envelope. After the 2010 Haiti earthquake, Simchi was a member of the Israeli rescue and medical team. In 2013, Simchi was promoted to the rank of brigadier general and appointed as the chief of staff of Home Front Command, a position that he stayed in until August 2016.

=== Fire and Rescue Services ===
In February 2017, minister of public security Gilad Erdan appointed Simchi to be the next Fire and Rescue Commissioner. During his tenure, Simchi had a series of conflicts with workers organizations in the fire department, in part because of claims from the Histadrut that Simchi harassed workers' representatives. On 3 March 2022, Simchi completed his duties and retired from service.

=== Politics ===
In May 2026, Simchi announced his intention to enter Israeli politics in an effort to "fix the political culture", and is "examining all the options" to "choose the best one".

In late June, Simchi is reportedly expected to announce a joint run with Blue and White, where the party's election polling has remained at or below the electoral threshold.

He is reportedly open to running with another party instead, as of early August.

== Personal life ==
Simchi lives in Gedera with his wife Orit and their three children. His son Guy died during the Battle of Re'im while he was serving in the 35th Paratroopers Brigade.
