= Ministry of Home Front Defense =

Former government ministry of Israel

- המשרד להגנת העורף
- Emblem of Israel

Agency overview
- Formed: 2011
- Dissolved: 2014
- Jurisdiction: Government of Israel

The Home Front Defense Ministry was a ministry in the Israeli government. The post was created for Matan Vilnai by Prime Minister Benjamin Netanyahu on January 19, 2011. At the time, Netanyahu explained his reasoning for the establishment of the new ministry:

Today, I would also like to appoint our friend Matan Vilnai as Home Front Defense Minister. I would also like to make it clear that we are talking bout [sic] establishing a separate ministry – a unique experiment – that will deal with the defense of the home front. This is the case in several other countries, the US for example, even though none of these countries have been hit by 12,000 missiles like we have and there are no such threats hanging over them. They have separate ministries for home front defense, how much more so should Israel, which needs a minister to deal with the issue in a separate and focused manner.

Between 2007 and 2011 Vilnai was effectively in charge of Home Front coordination in his capacity as Deputy Minister of Defense under Ehud Barak.

== List of ministers ==
#	Minister	Party	Governments	Term start	Term end	Notes
1	Matan Vilnai	Independence	32	19 January 2011	16 August 2012	
2	Avi Dichter	Not an MK	32	16 August 2012	18 March 2013	Dichter resigned from Kadima and the Knesset to become Minister.
3	Gilad Erdan	Likud	33	18 March 2013	30 June 2014	
