= Shachiv Shnaan =

Israeli Druze politician

- شكيب شنان
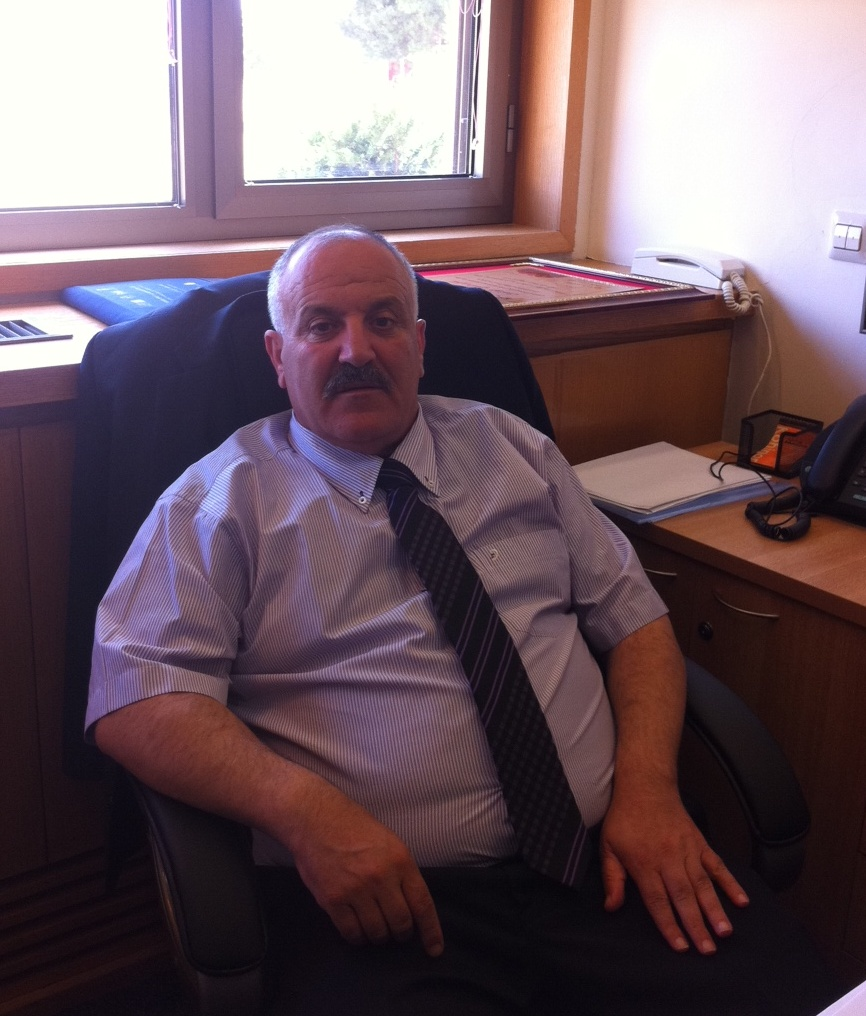

Faction represented in the Knesset
- 2008–2009: Labor Party
- 2012–2013: Independence

Personal details
- Born: 20 June 1960 (age 66) Hurfeish, Israel

Shachiv Shnaan (Arabic: شكيب شنان, Hebrew: שכיב שנאן; born 20 June 1960) is an Israeli-Druze politician who served as a member of the Knesset for Independence.

== Early life and education ==
Shnaan, a Druze, was born and raised in Hurfeish. In his military service with the Israel Defense Forces, he was a fighter in the Herev Battalion. Afterwards he completed his academic studies at Tel Aviv University in general studies, Middle East studies and pre-law studies. Shnaan then returned to his home town, working between 1989-1995 as a teacher and acting principal of the local six-years secondary school.

== Political career ==
=== Activity and positions held ===
Throughout the years Shnaan was active with the Histadrut Labor Federation. He was appointed as an advisor to Deputy Minister of Internal Affairs Saleh Tarif. Following the elections to the 14th Knesset he was a senior advisor to the Minister responsible for Minorities Affairs within the Prime Minister's Office. He held this position between 1997 and 2001, and was later appointed as the administrator of the Northern District for the Ministry of Labor and Welfare. Shnaan was also director of the district's branch of the Ministry of Welfare. In 2005 he was appointed by Minister of Internal Affairs Ophir Pines-Paz as his senior advisor, maintaining the post for one year.

=== Knesset ===
In 2006, Shnaan nominated himself for the Labor Party's list of candidates for the 2006 elections. He was elected to the slot reserved for a Druze representative, 20th on the party's list, and entered the Knesset on 28 May 2008, following the resignation of Efraim Sneh. He was a member of the Education, Culture and Sports Committee. Prior to his entry to the Knesset, Shnaan was considered by party chairman Amir Peretz as his candidate for the post of minister, eventually given to Raleb Majadele.

Placed 16th on the party's list for the 2009 elections, Shnaan lost his seat as Labor was reduced to 13 seats. He subsequently joined the breakaway Independence party, and returned to the Knesset on 14 February 2012 as a replacement for Matan Vilnai, who had been appointed as ambassador to China. Shnaan lost his Knesset seat in 2013 after Independence chose not to contend in the elections.

=== Post-Knesset ===
In October 2017, Shnaan addressed a convention of the Arab-Jewish coexistence organization "Women Wage Peace" in Jerusalem.

In late July 2018, Shachiv Shnaan took part in a delegation of Druze politicians and community leaders in a meeting with Prime Minister Benjamin Netanyahu and several cabinet ministers. They presented the community's opposition to clauses in Israel's newly enacted "Nationality law", impacting minority populations' status regarding self-definition and removing Arabic as an official language of the state.

== Personal life ==
Shnaan resides in Hurfeish, is married and a father of five. His youngest son, border policeman Kamil Shinan, was killed during a terror attack on the Temple Mount on 14 July 2017.
