= Zev Vilnay =

Israeli geographer

Zeev Vilnay
- זאב וילנאי
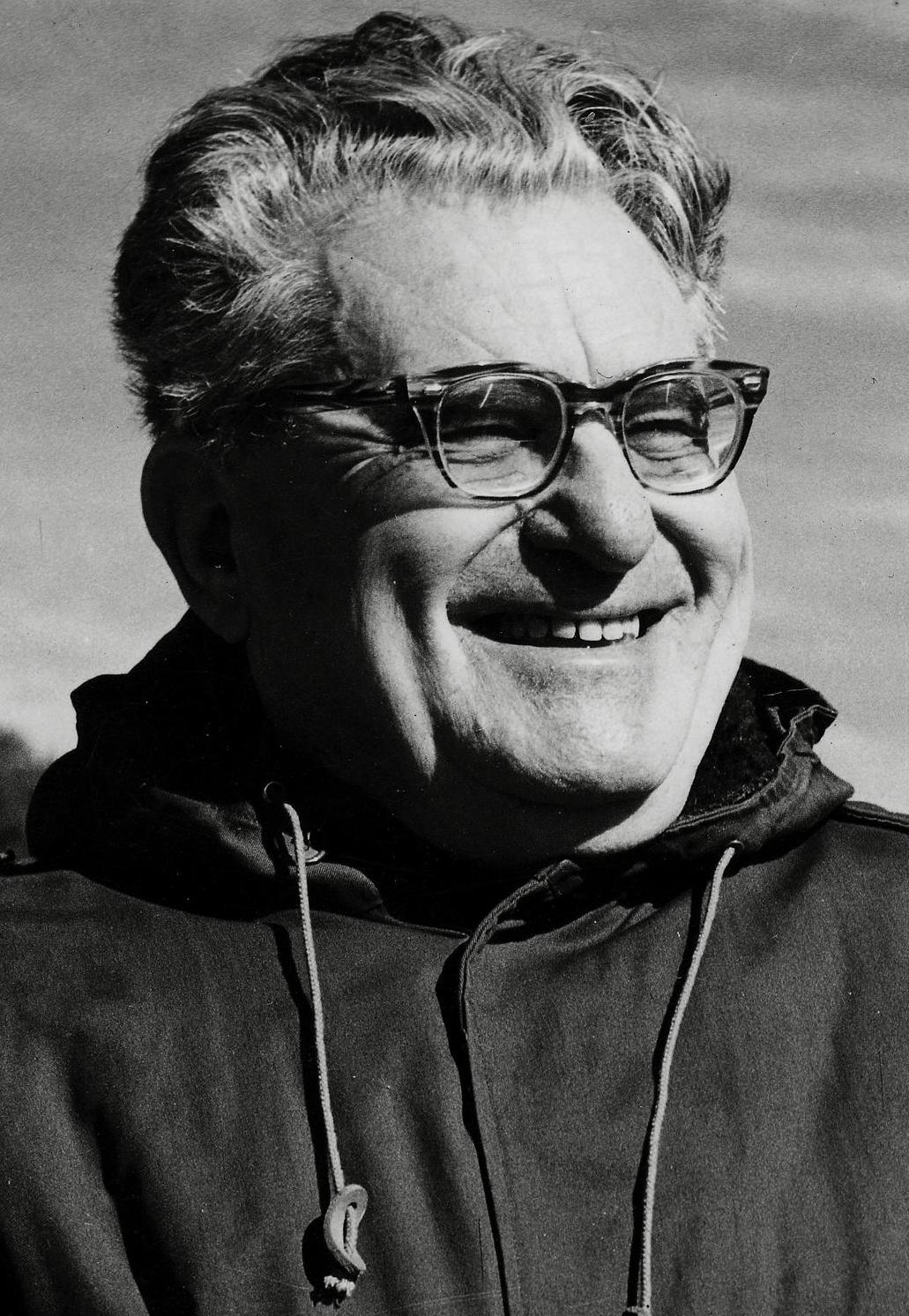
- Zeev Vilnay in 1970
- Born: June 12, 1900; Kishinev, Russian Empire
- Died: 21 January 1988 (aged 87); Jerusalem, Israel
- Known for: Guide to Israel
- Spouse: Esther Vilnay
- Awards: Israel Prize, 1982
- Scientific career
- Fields: Geography

Zeev Vilnay (Hebrew: זאב וילנאי; 12 June 1900 – 21 January 1988) was an Israeli geographer, author and lecturer.

== Biography ==
Zev Vilnay was born as Volf Vilensky in Kishinev, Russian Empire (now in Moldova). He immigrated to Palestine with his parents at the age of six and grew up in Haifa. He served as a military topographer in the Haganah, and later in the Israel Defense Forces.

Vilnay and his wife Esther lived in Jerusalem. Their eldest son, Oren Vilnay, is an expert in structural engineering who established the Department of Civil Engineering at Ben-Gurion University of the Negev. The other son, Matan Vilnai, was a General in the Israel Defense Forces, who later became a politician who served as a member of the Knesset and held several ministerial portfolios before becoming ambassador to China during 2012-2017.

== Land of Israel studies ==
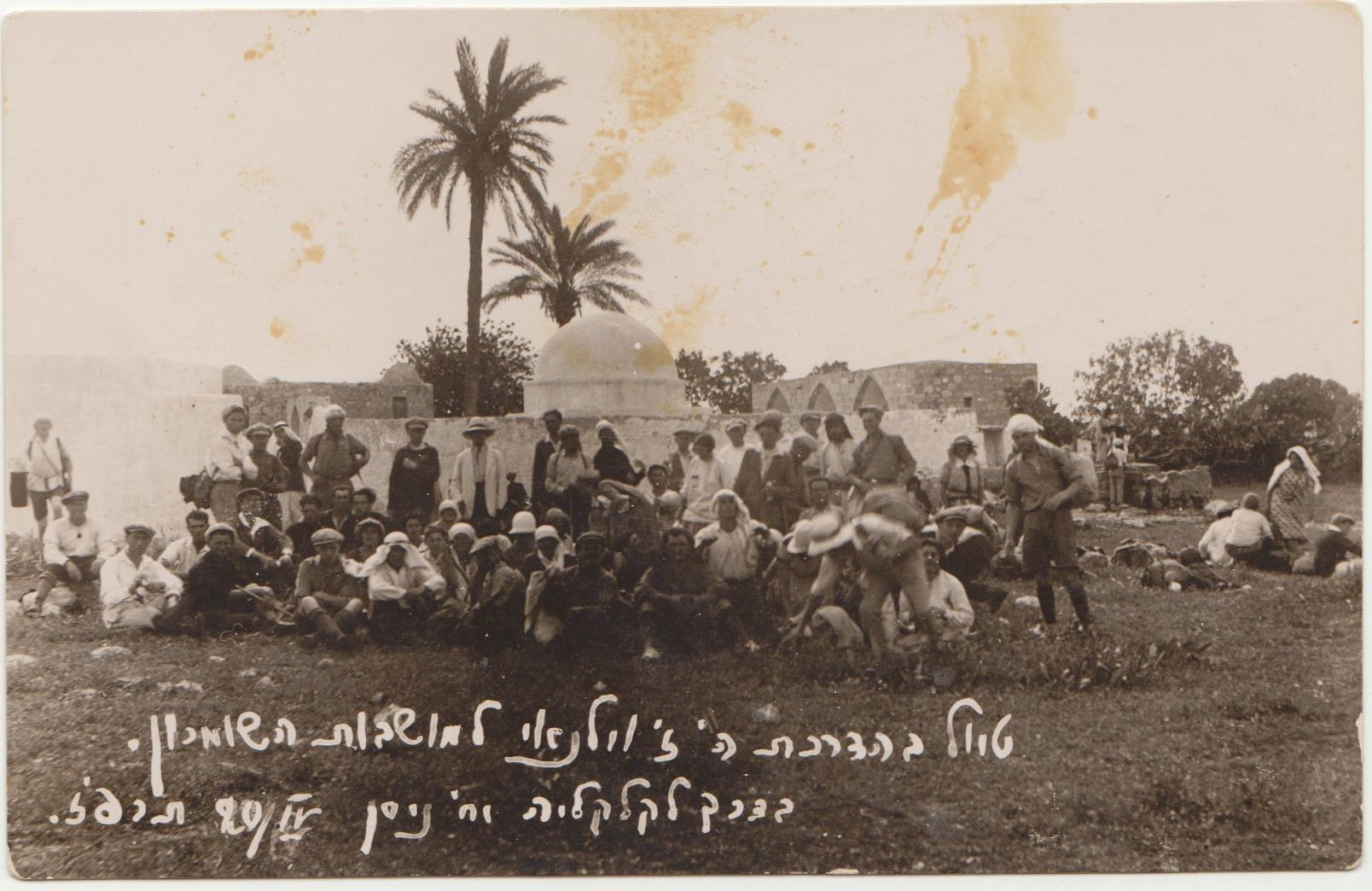
Tour of Samaria led by Zev Vilnay, 1927

Vilnay was a pioneer in the sphere of outdoor hiking and touring in Israel. Vilnay lectured widely on Israeli geography, ethnography, history and folklore. His Guide to Israel was published in 27 editions and translated into many languages.

In his 1950 book The Hike and Its Educational Value, Vilnai traced the Jewish emphasis on walking the Land of Israel back to the Bible. He describes a continuous historical thread that passes through the Jewish sources, and quotes the Talmudic dictum that anyone who walks three or four cubits through Erez Yisra'el merits a place in the world to come (Ketubot 111a).

In the 1974 edition of his guide, Vilnay describes how he helped bring back to Israel the boat of a British naval officer, Thomas Howard Molyneux, who sailed the Jordan River from the Sea of Galilee to the Dead Sea to map the region in the 19th century.

Vilnay was a member of the first place-naming committee established by Prime Minister David Ben-Gurion in 1950. In 2021 a Chair for the study of the knowledge of Land of Israel (‘Yediath Ha’Aretz’) and its archaeology, named after Zev Vilnay, was founded in the Department of the Land of Israel Studies at the Kinneret College on the Sea of Galilee. The Chair serves as a framework for the advancement of academic studies which deals with the history of the research of these subjects. In addition, the Chair will distribute the research carried out in the field and make it accessible to the non-academic Land of Israel lovers in the general public.

== Awards and recognition ==
- In 1974, Vilnay received the Yakir Yerushalayim (Worthy Citizen of Jerusalem) award.
- In 1981, he was the co-recipient (jointly with Avraham Even-Shoshan) of the Bialik Prize for Jewish thought.
- In 1982, he was awarded the Israel Prize, for knowledge and love of the Land of Israel.

== Published works in English ==
- Legends of Palestine (1932)
- The Guide to Israel (first published in 1955)
- The Holy Land in Old Prints and Maps (1965)
- The New Israel Atlas: Bible to Present Day (1968)
- The Changing Face of Acco
- Legends of Jerusalem (3 volumes)
- Legends of Galilee, Jordan & Sinai (1978)
- Legends of Judea and Samaria
- The Vilnay Guide to Israel: A new Millennium Edition (2 volumes) (1999), written and edited after his death and according to his instructions by Oren and Rachel Vilnay

== Published works in Hebrew ==
- Entziklopediya Liyidiat Haaretz (3 volumes) (1956)
- Yerushalayim (2 volumes) (1960–62, 1970)
- Eretz Yisrael Betmunot Atikot (1961)
- Matzevot Kodesh Be'eretz Yisrael (1963)
- Tel Aviv-Jaffa (1965)
- Yehudah Veshomron (1968)
- Sinai, Avar Vehoveh (1969)
- Golan Vehermon (1970)
- Ariel – Entziklopediya Lidiyat HaAretz (10 volumes) (1976–82)

== See also ==
- List of Israel Prize recipients
- List of Bialik Prize recipients
