= Avi Dichter =

Israeli politician (born 1952)

- אבי דיכטר
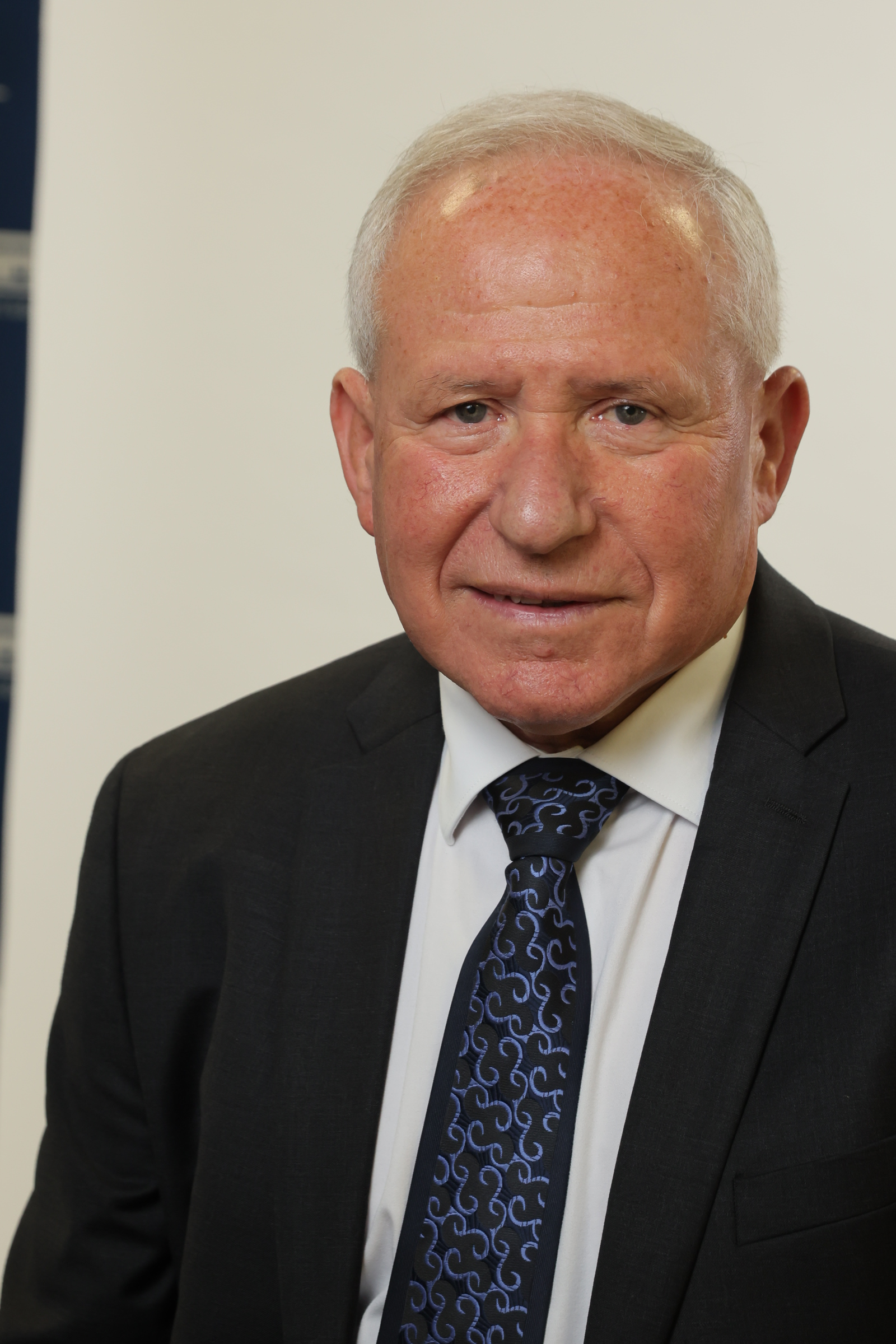
- Dichter in 2012

Ministerial roles
- 2006–2009: Minister of Internal Security
- 2012–2013: Minister of Home Front Defence
- 2022–: Minister of Agriculture and Rural Development

Faction represented in the Knesset
- 2006–2012: Kadima
- 2015–2026: Likud

Personal details
- Born: 14 December 1952 (age 73) Ashkelon, Israel

Abraham Moshe "Avi" Dichter (Hebrew: אַבְרָהָם (אָבִי) מֹשֶׁה דִיכְטֶר, IPA: [ˈavi ˈdiχteʁ]; born 14 December 1952) is an Israeli politician currently serving as the Minister of Agriculture and Food Development. A former Minister of Internal Security and Shin Bet director, he resigned from the Knesset and left Kadima in August 2012 in order to become Minister of Home Front Defense, a position he vacated in March 2013. Served as MK for Likud from 2015 to 2026.

== Biography ==
Avraham (Avi) Dichter was born in Ashkelon. His parents were Holocaust survivors from Poland. As an adolescent, he joined the Hashomer Hatzair youth movement. After graduating high school, he served in an elite unit of the Israel Defense Forces, Sayeret Matkal, under then Commander Ehud Barak. Upon completing his military service, Dichter joined Shin Bet, Israel's internal security service. In 1986, he earned a BA in Social Science from Bar-Ilan University, in Ramat Gan. He also has an MBA from Tel Aviv University.

In 1973, he married Ilana Wallerstein, a teacher and artist who he had met in high school. They have three children.

== Internal security career ==
Dichter began his career in Shin Bet as a sky marshal for the Israeli airline El Al. After becoming proficient in Arabic and completing field intelligence courses, he began working in the Shin Bet's Southern District, specifically the Gaza Strip. In 1992, he was appointed director for the region. Aiming to improve the Shin Bet's protection capabilities, Dichter was appointed Director of the Security and Protection Division. In 1999, he became Deputy Director of Shin Bet. In 2000, he was promoted to director.

During his tenure, the Palestinians launched the Second Intifada. Under Dichter's leadership, Shin Bet changed its modus operandi and restructured its mission and duties to serve at the forefront of Israel's security and counter-terrorism efforts. The organisation spearheaded counter-insurgency and intelligence operations deep inside the West Bank and the Gaza Strip, thereby reducing the number of attacks against Israel.

== Political career ==
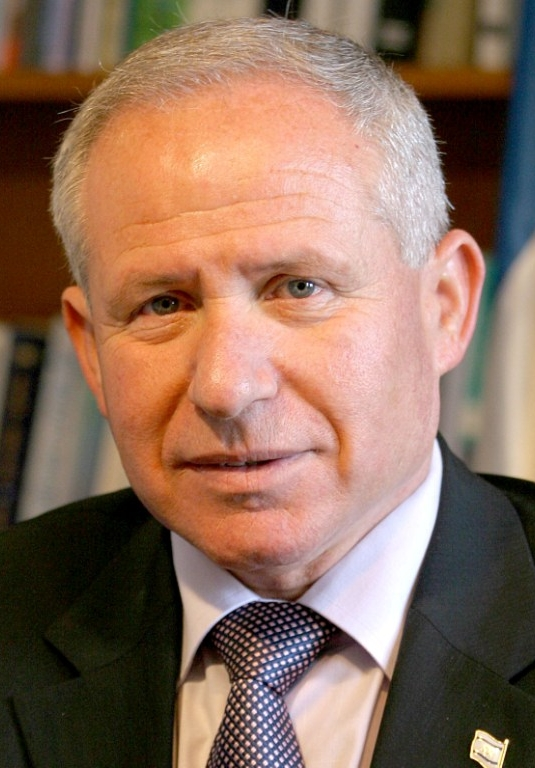
Dichter in 2012

In September 2005, Dichter left office and became a research fellow at the Brookings Institution in Washington, D.C. Several months later, he returned to Israel and announced his foray into politics with the newly established Kadima. He was elected to the Knesset on the party's list in 2006, and on 4 May that year was sworn in as the Minister of Internal Security. In this role, he oversaw Israel's law enforcement system including Israel's Police Force and Prison Service.

As Minister of Public Security, Dichter made several reforms in the fields under the auspices of the ministry. These included budgetary and organizational reform, the building of a Witness Protection Program, and the formation of a national crime fighting unit (Lahav 433) similar to the United States' FBI. In 2007, Dichter canceled a trip to the United Kingdom over concerns that he would be arrested on war crimes charges for his role in the assassination of Salah Shehade.

After Ehud Olmert resigned as party leader, Dichter entered the leadership election. However, he came fourth with only 6.5% of the vote. He retained his seat in the 2009 elections after being placed ninth on the party's list, but lost his cabinet portfolio as the Likud-led coalition formed the government.

In Matar v. Dichter, the Center for Constitutional Rights filed a federal class action lawsuit against Dichter on behalf of the Palestinians killed or injured in a 2002 "targeted killing" air strike in Gaza; charging him with extrajudicial killing, war crimes and other gross human rights violations. On 16 April 2009, the United States Court of Appeals for the Second Circuit dismissed the case citing Dichter's immunity under the Foreign Sovereign Immunities Act (FSIA).

In March 2009, Dichter banned a series of Palestinian Authority-sponsored events billed as the 2009 Arab Capital of Culture planned for Jerusalem, Nazareth and other parts of the country. Dichter said they violated the Israeli–Palestinian treaty barring PA events on the territory of Israel. Nazareth Mayor Ramiz Jaraisy criticized the move as anti-Arab. Eight events were cancelled and twenty organizers and participants were detained.

On 3 August 2011, Dichter and 39 other Knesset members signed the proposed Basic Law proposal: Israel as the Nation-State of the Jewish People.

In August 2012, he announced that he was leaving the Knesset and joining the Israeli cabinet to replace Home Front Defense Minister Matan Vilnai, who resigned to become Israel's ambassador to China. Dichter was replaced by Kadima's Ahmed Dabbah.

In November 2012, during Operation Pillar of Defense, Dichter said: "We have no other choice; Israel must perform a reformatting of Gaza, and rearrange it, as we did in Judea and Samaria during Operation Defensive Shield." Dichter's call has been echoed in the Israeli press, albeit being bashed by critics of Israel's policy.

Dichter featured in the 2012 documentary film The Gatekeepers and discussed the main events of his tenure in Shin Bet.

In March 2013, Playboy magazine published its first version in Hebrew featuring an interview with Avi Dichter.

Between 2016 and 2019 he served as Chairman of the Knesset Foreign Affairs and Defense Committee.

Upon the Likud's return to power in late 2022, Dichter was appointed Agriculture Minister. He called for the government's proposed judicial reforms to be frozen due to widespread protests but he said he would still vote for the proposals.

During an interview with Channel 12 in November 2023, Dichter endorsed the forced displacement of civilians from the northern Gaza Strip while discussing the ongoing Gaza war. When asked if images of the displacement of civilians were comparable to images of the Nakba, he said "We are now rolling out the Gaza Nakba. From an operational point of view, there is no way to wage a war – as the IDF seeks to do in Gaza – with masses between the tanks and the soldiers." When asked again he reiterated, "Gaza Nakba 2023. That’s how it’ll end." He later said that he did not know whether the residents of Gaza City would be allowed to return. His comments were met with criticism internationally, along with criticism from Prime Minister Benjamin Netanyahu the following day and the attorney general to the Israeli government, Gali Baharav-Miara who stated that his comments could be interpreted as a war crime.
