= Gilad Erdan =

Israeli politician and diplomat

- גלעד ארדן
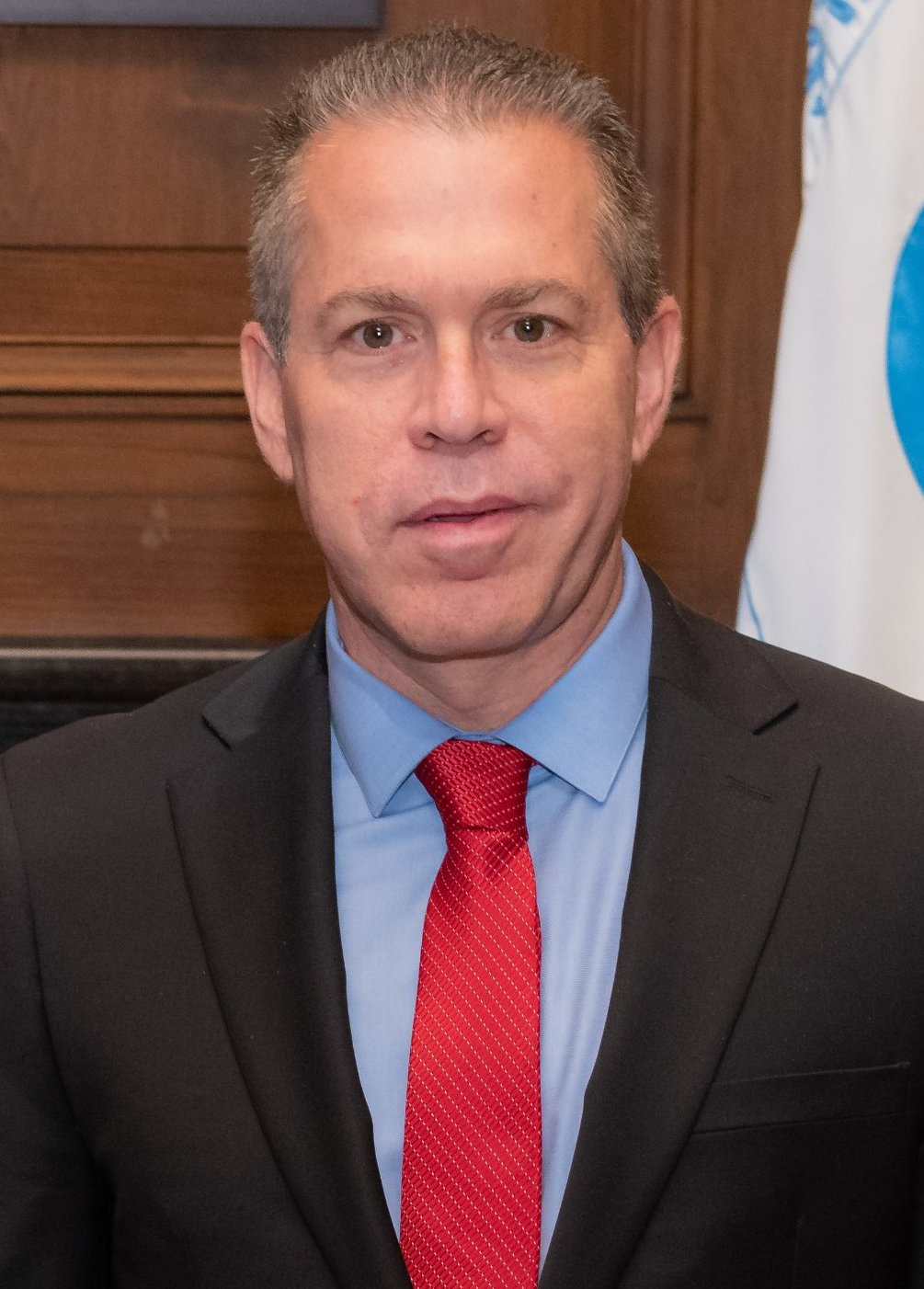
- Erdan in 2021

18th Permanent Representative of Israel to the United Nations
- In office 5 July 2020 – 10 August 2024
- President: Reuven Rivlin; Isaac Herzog
- Prime Minister: Benjamin Netanyahu; Naftali Bennett; Yair Lapid
- Preceded by: Danny Danon
- Succeeded by: Danny Danon

Faction represented in the Knesset
- 2003–2020: Likud

Personal details
- Born: Gilad Menashe Erdan; 30 September 1970 (age 56) Ashkelon, Southern District, Israel
- Education: Bar-Ilan University; Tel Aviv University

Gilad Erdan (Hebrew: גלעד ארדן; born 30 September 1970) is an Israeli politician and diplomat who was a prominent figure in the Likud party, serving as a long-time member of the Knesset from 2003 to 2020 and holding numerous senior ministerial portfolios.

He served as Permanent Representative of Israel to the United Nations from 2020 through 2024, having previously served as Ambassador to the United States. Within the Israeli government, his ministerial posts included Minister of Environmental Protection (2009–2013), Communications (2013–2014), Home Front Defense (2013–2014), Interior (2014–2015), Minister of Public Security (2015–2020), Minister of Strategic Affairs and Public Diplomacy (2015–2020) and Minister of Regional Cooperation (2020).

Breaking with Likud, he launched Unity, a new right-wing political party, with Yuli Edelstein in August 2026, which ultimately did not participate in the election.

== Background and personal life ==
Gilad Menashe Erdan was born in Ashkelon. He is of Romanian Jewish and Hungarian Jewish descent. He studied at Netiv-Meir yeshiva high-school in Jerusalem. He attained the rank of captain during his military service in the Adjutant Corps of the IDF. After his military service, he studied law at Bar-Ilan University, gaining an LL.B., and started working as an attorney. Later on, he gained a master's degree in political science from Tel-Aviv University (cum laude). Erdan is married with four children, and when in Israel, he lives in Kiryat Ono.

== Political career ==
Erdan began his political activity in opposition to the Oslo Accords, during his legal studies in the early 1990s. In these circumstances he met with then Likud MK Ariel Sharon, and soon started working as Sharon's political advisor. When Likud won the elections in 1996, Erdan was appointed as an advisor to Prime Minister Benjamin Netanyahu and as director of the Department for Public Inquiries to the Prime Minister's Office between 1996 and 1998. In February 1998, Erdan was elected by a vast majority as the chairman of "Young Likud", and served in this position for 6 years. During his term as Young Likud chairman, Erdan led many of the party's ideological and field activities in opposition to Ehud Barak's 1999-2001 government.

=== Member of Knesset ===
Erdan was first elected to the 16th Knesset in the 2003 elections. During his first term in the Knesset, Erdan was one of the most outspoken opponents of the unilateral Disengagement Plan from the Gaza Strip led by Prime Minister Ariel Sharon from the Likud. In November 2005, Faced with harsh opposition to his plan, Sharon left Likud with several other MKs, and created a new party, Kadima. Erdan remained in Likud and after winning fourth place in the party's primaries, retained his seat in the 17th Knesset in the 2006 elections despite Likud's collapse from 40 to 12 seats in the Knesset. Erdan was re-elected to the 18th Knesset in 2009.

Serving as Member of Knesset, Erdan has supported boosting ties between Israel and Evangelical Christians, as well as presenting bills to enforce no-smoking laws, permanently revoking the driving licenses of serial traffic offenders, and allowing the courts to revoke citizenship for citizens visiting enemy countries or acquiring citizenship from such countries. The latter bill was submitted following Israeli Arab MK Azmi Bishara's visit to Syria, an enemy-state to the state of Israel.

=== In the 32nd government ===
After the 2009 elections to the Knesset, Erdan was appointed Minister of Environmental Protection, and the Minister in charge of coordinating between the Government and the Knesset in the 32nd Government. Upon the government taking office, he expressed support for Avigdor Lieberman's speech opposing the Annapolis Conference and international pressure. He commented that "Israel does not take orders from Obama" and that "citizens of Israel have decided that they will not become the fifty first US state".

As Minister of Environmental Protection, Erdan introduced the most comprehensive River Restoration program to date, legislated and enforced the protection of beaches and the coastline, increased recycling through a bottling and packaging law, and created the Beer Sheva River Park – an ecological park built on a former garbage dump – where thousands of people enjoy bike paths, walking trails, a lake, sports area, and a botanical garden. He initiated a "pollution has no borders" policy which included reducing Israel's Greenhouse Gas Emissions, increasing water desalination, in an effort to make Israel the world leader in water recycling. He also imposed limitations on the import and export of living monkeys for medical purposes, resulting in the closure of the "Mazor Farm", a disputed monkey-breeding farm.

In May 2009, Erdan was declared "man of the decade" by Or Yarok, a prominent road safety NGO in Israel, for his lasting efforts to reduce traffic accidents and fatalities.

=== In the 33rd government ===
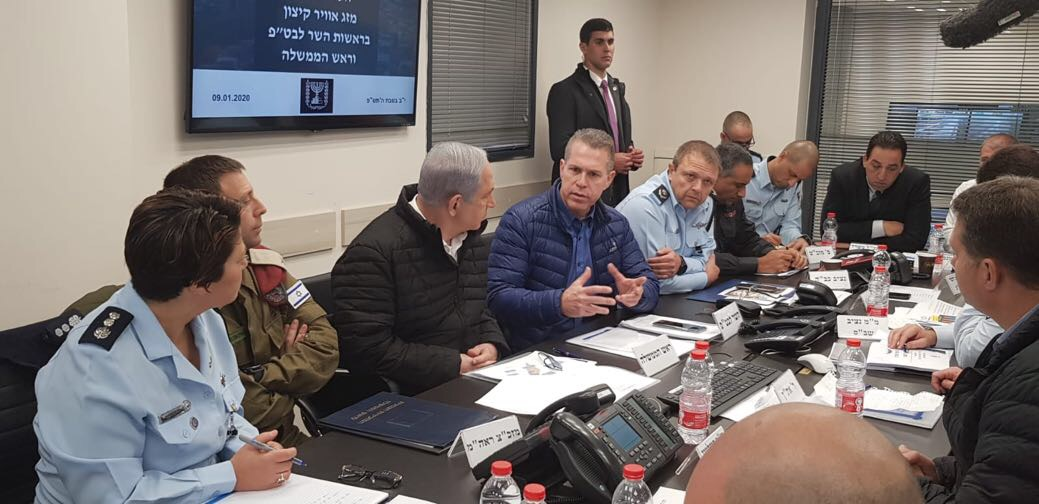
Erdan surveying the readiness of emergency services for stormy weather, with Prime-Minister Benjamin Netanyahu, Police Commissioner Moti Cohen and Fire & Rescue Commissioner Dedi Simchi.

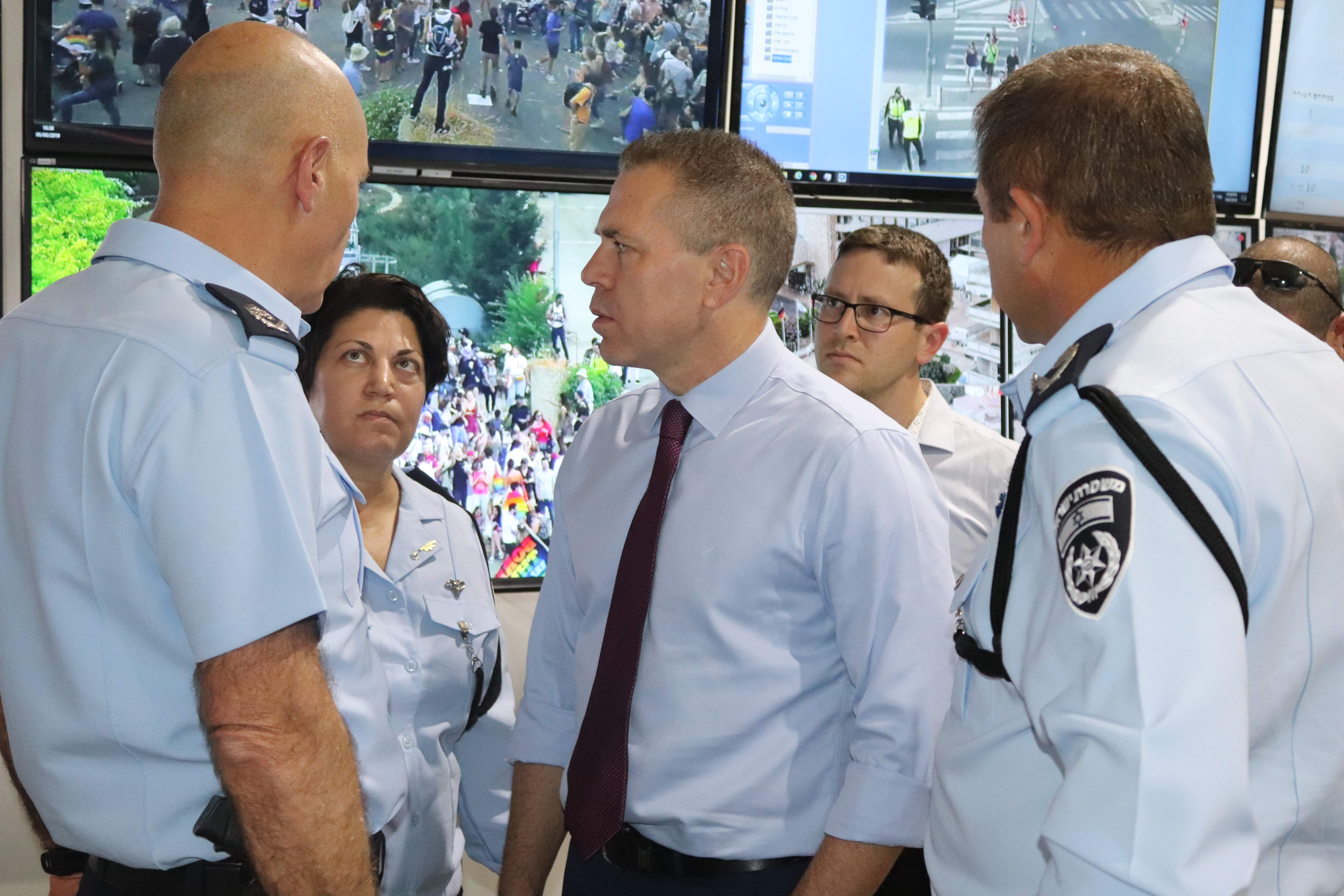
Erdan visiting a police control center during the 2019 Pride Parade in Jerusalem, with Police Commissioner Moti Cohen and commander of the Jerusalem district, Doron Yadid.

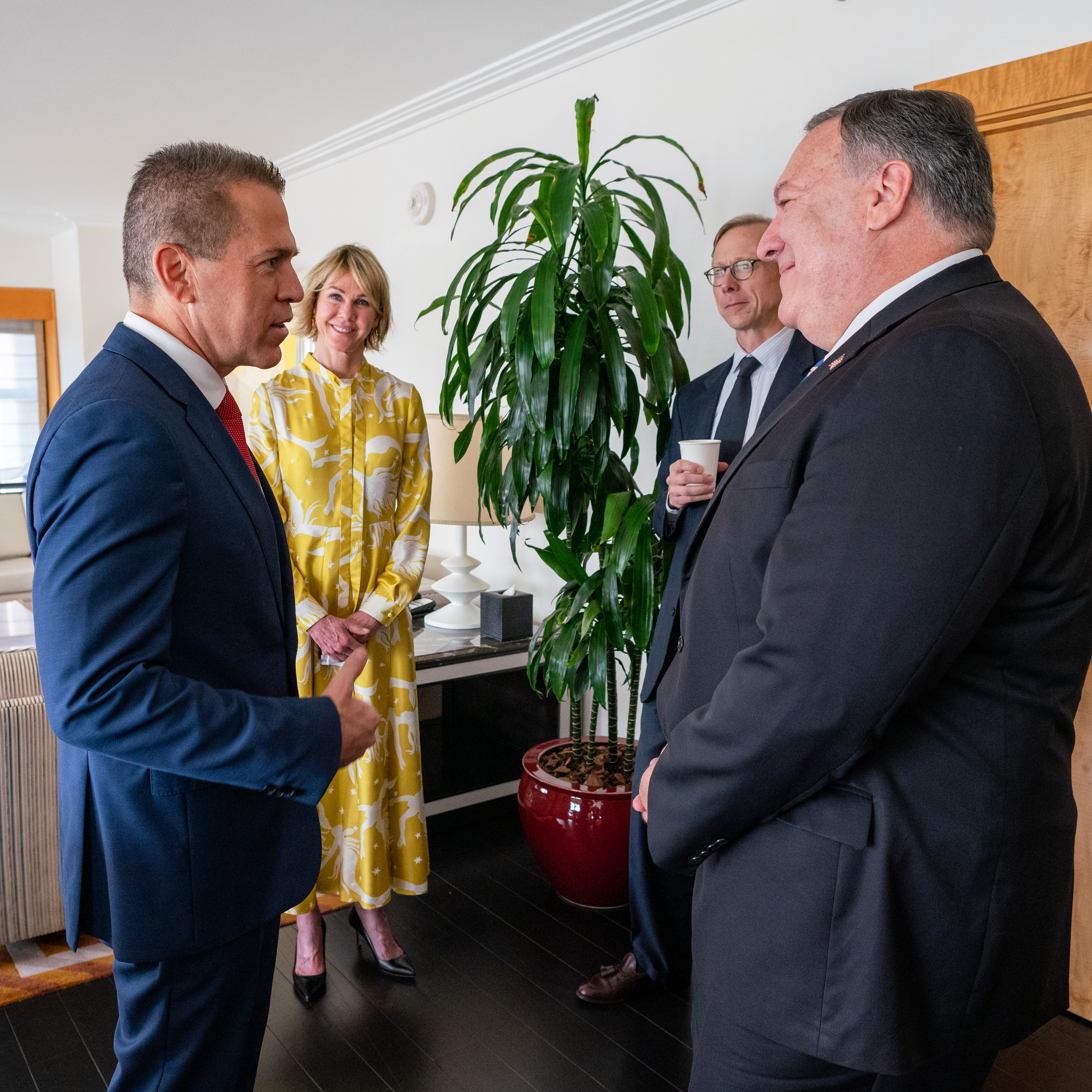
US secretary of state Mike Pompeo and US ambassador to the United Nations Kelly Craft meet with Gilad Erdan, August 2020

Following the 2013 elections to the Knesset, Erdan was appointed the minister of communications and minister of home front defense in the 33rd Government. He was also appointed as a member of the Security Cabinet. On 22 April 2014, after several ongoing disputes with the defense minister, Moshe (Bogi) Yaalon, on matters of authority, Erdan announced his resignation as the minister of home front defense, and called the prime-minister to dissolve the ministry entirely. The ministry was shut down subsequently.

In November 2014, Erdan was appointed minister of interior following Gideon Sa'ar's resignation.

=== In the 34th government ===
On 24 May 2015, Prime Minister Netanyahu appointed Erdan as Minister of Public Security, Strategic Affairs and Public Diplomacy in the 34th Government. Erdan was again appointed as a member of the Security Cabinet. Erdan's appointment came eleven days after he initially refused to join Netanyahu's cabinet, claiming he wasn't offered enough tools to make a real change as a Minister.

As the Minister of Public Security, Erdan was in charge of the Police, Prison Service and the Fire and Rescue Services. As Minister of Strategic Affairs and Public Diplomacy, Erdan received the responsibility to coordinate the national response to the attempts to delegitimize the State of Israel, and spearhead the fight against the Boycott, Divestment and Sanctions campaign against Israel.

Upon entering his role, the state of Israel started facing a new wave of Palestinian "terror attacks", carried out mainly by incited individuals, commonly referred to as the "Knife Intifada". Erdan's plan to deal with this consisted of several steps: strengthening Israeli police presence in Jerusalem; outlawing two Muslim organizations, the Morabitun and Murabitat, who were accused of harassing and inciting violence against Jews on the Temple Mount; and dealing with online incitement. Erdan initiated the construction and opening of new police stations in East Jerusalem, which was seen by many residents as representative of "another step in increased Israeli influence in East Jerusalem".

In 2016, Erdan and Minister of Justice Ayelet Shaked proposed the so-called "Facebook bill" which would enable Israeli courts force social media companies like Facebook, Google or Twitter to remove public content deemed to be a threat to national security, public security, or a violation of the law. The bill has been widely criticized for threatening freedom of speech online. Following the submission of the bill, a senior delegation from Facebook arrived in Israel to meet with Erdan, agreeing to work together in order to improve the detection and removal of inciting material online.

In 2018, Erdan initiated new legislation intended to partially de-criminalize the use of cannabis for recreational purposes. The reform, which was recommended by a professional committee appointed by Erdan, was called "Responsible Decriminalization", as it did not fully legalize cannabis, but instead made private recreational use punishable by fines. The rationale for this move, explained Erdan, was to prevent unnecessary arrests while retaining deterrence of cannabis use in the public sphere, saying "the current policy has failed and has not caused a decrease in the use of drugs. Cannabis is a dangerous drug, and there has been a significant increase in its use. ... But the right way to operate is via the path of education, prevention and rehabilitation rather than criminal enforcement against regular citizens."

Erdan also established The Child Online Protection Bureau, also known as Police Unit 105 (part of Lahav 433), which is tasked with investigating crimes against children and teens online, and created a hotline (#105) to report such crimes.

=== Permanent Representative to the UN ===
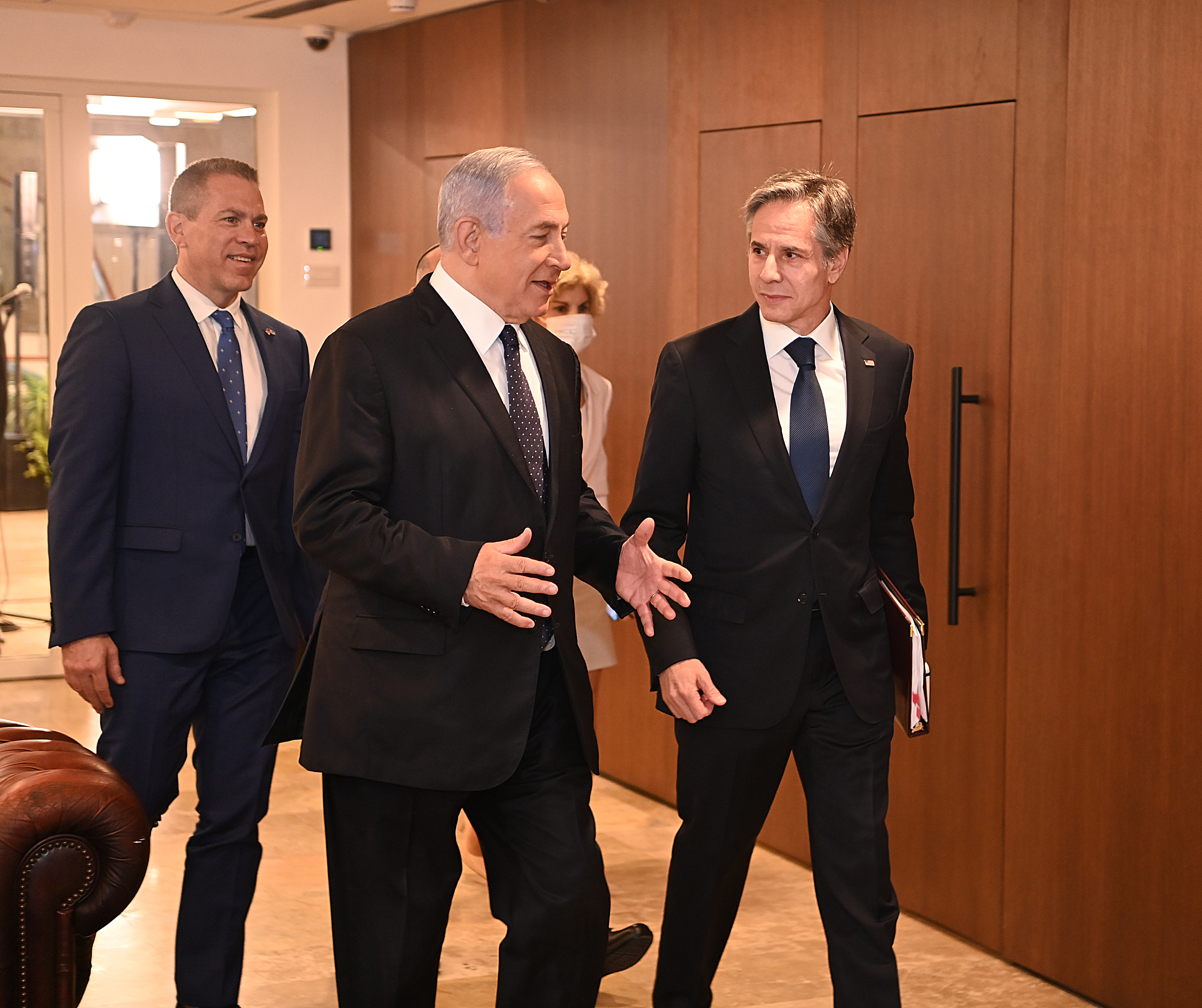
Erdan with Israeli prime minister Benjamin Netanyahu and U.S. Secretary of State Antony Blinken in Jerusalem on 24 May 2021

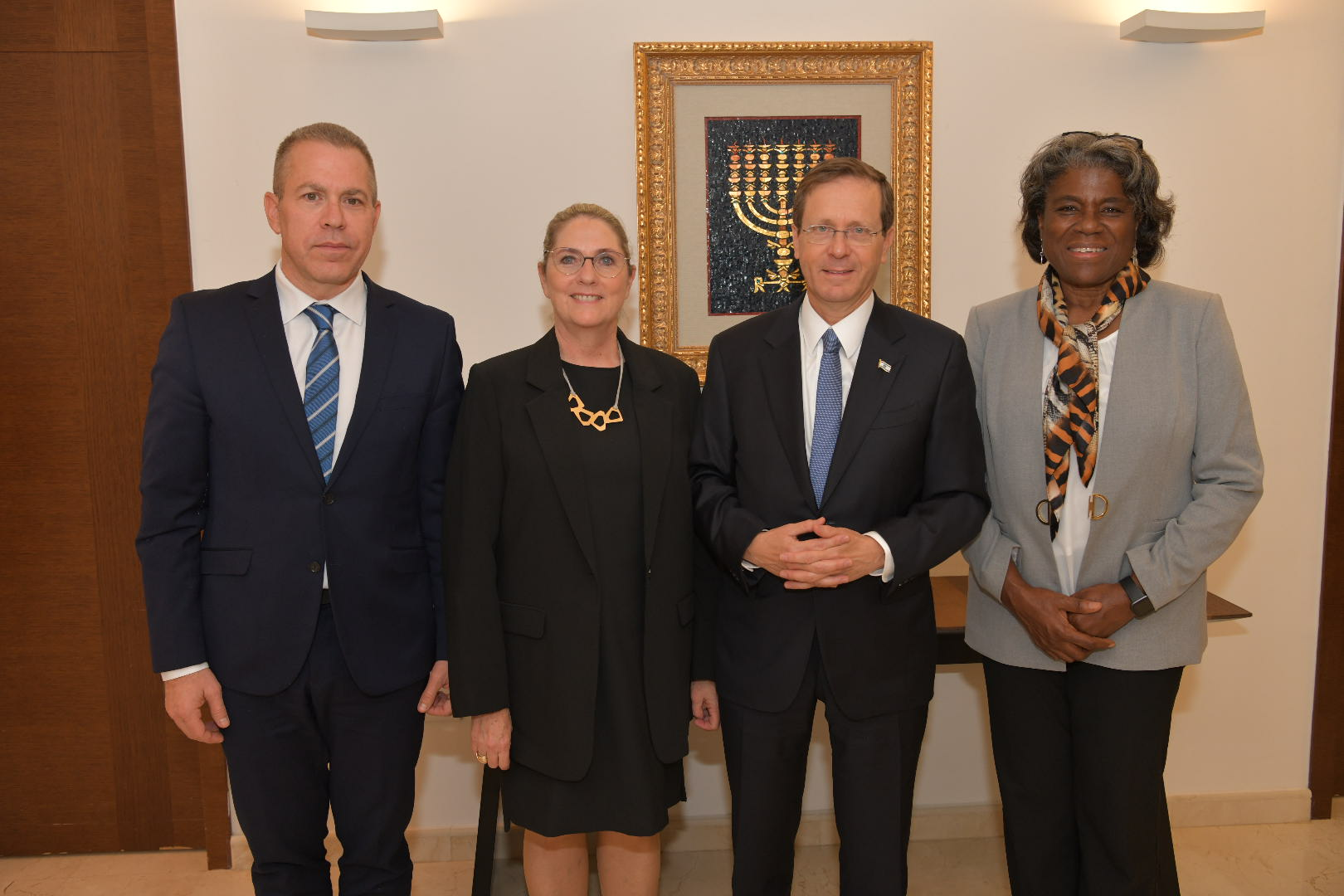
Erdan with Israeli president Isaac Herzog and U.S. Ambassador to the UN Linda Thomas-Greenfield in Jerusalem, 15 November 2021

On 11 May 2020, following the 2020 elections to the Knesset, Prime Minister Netanyahu announced that Erdan would become Israel's next Ambassador to the UN and also become Israel's Ambassador to the United States after the 2020 presidential election. The last person to hold those two positions concurrently was the diplomat and politician, Abba Eban, in the 1950s.

On 17 May 2020, Erdan was sworn in as Regional Cooperation Minister of Israel in the 35th Government. However, his appointment was short-lived, as he was made Permanent Representative of Israel to the United Nations and the Israeli ambassador to the United States. The following year, he stepped down as ambassador to the U.S. and was replaced by Mike Herzog, who succeeded him on 15 November 2021.

On 7 June 2022, Erdan was elected to serve as one of the vice-presidents of the General Assembly for its seventy-seventh session as a representative of the Western states.

On 31 October 2023, Erdan, as well as other Israeli delegates, began wearing yellow star badges with the words "Never Again" written on them, in response to international criticism of Israel's conduct during the Gaza war. Erdan claimed that the UN Security Council was "silent" about the Hamas-led attack on Israel, and said that he would wear the star "as a symbol of pride". This action was immediately condemned by Yad Vashem chairman Dani Dayan, who called it a "[disgrace to] the victims of the Holocaust as well as the state of Israel," while adding "The slaughter of Jews by Hamas on October 7th was genocidal in its intents and immeasurably brutal in its form. Part of why it differs from the Holocaust is because Jews have today a state and an army. We are not defenseless and at the mercy of others." According to Ynet, unnamed officials from Israel's Ministry of Foreign Affairs were also highly critical of the decision, with one calling it a "cheap gimmick that doesn't serve our goal", and others describing it as an attempt to appeal to Likud party members.

On 8 December 2023, Erdan thanked the United States for vetoing a UN Security Council resolution calling for an immediate humanitarian ceasefire in the Gaza Strip. He also thanked US president Joe Biden for "standing steadfastly" with Israel.

In December 2023, Erdan accused Hungarian–American investor and philanthropist George Soros of supporting pro-Palestinian organizations "that seek the destruction of the State of Israel as a Jewish state".

On 10 May 2024, the UN General Assembly voted to advance Palestinian membership in the UN. Erdan, in a speech before the General Assembly, in which he invoked the Holocaust, World War II, and Adolf Hitler, and fed a mock copy of the U.N. charter into a small paper shredder to illustrate what he described as the General Assembly's "disregard" for the document. The General Assembly voted overwhelmingly in favor of asking the Security Council to accept Palestine as a full member.

On 8 June 2024, the UN placed both Israel and Hamas on a list of "warring parties committing grave violations against children in armed conflict" colloquially known as the "list of shame". Erdan leaked UN spokesperson Stéphane Dujarric's phone call notifying him of the decision, which he decried as "simply outrageous and wrong". Dujarric told The New York Times that the leak of the message was "shocking and unacceptable and something I've never seen in my 25 years serving this organization." Erdan stated that the Israeli "is the most moral in the world," and that "the only one being blacklisted is the Secretary-General who incentivizes and encourages terrorism and is motivated by hatred towards Israel."

In August 2024, Erdan was replaced as UN ambassador by his predecessor Danny Danon.

=== Unity party ===
In early May 2026, Erdan confirms that he was considering forming a new party amidst dissatisfaction with Haredi conscription policy. Erdan was reportedly in talks with Yuli Edelstein in late May regarding the potential formation of a new party.

On 6 August, Erdan and Edelstein launched a new party in Tel Aviv led by Erdan, which was revealed on 11 August to be named "Unity" (Hebrew: האחדות, romanized: HaAchdut). Erdan stated that the party would form a "broad Zionist government" and would be in favor of military or national service for all Israelis. He also called for more extensive public diplomacy.

By early September, Erdan stated in an interview that Unity was considering allying with other parties as it struggled to reach the electoral threshold. However, talks with Benny Gantz of Blue and White regarding an alliance were unsuccessful on 4 September. That day, Erdan announced that Unity would withdraw from the 2026 election citing poor polling, low public support for a unity government, and unfruitful alliance negotiations.

== Public activities ==
Outside the Knesset, Erdan was elected in 2005 as chairman of Al Sam, a non-governmental non-profit organization dealing with drug issues of youths (he also served on the Knesset's Committee on Drug Abuse), and also established the Lobby for Soldiers Missing in Action. Erdan was also a member of the Israel Broadcasting Authority's General Assembly.
