= Shalom Simhon =

Israeli politician and social worker

- שלום שמחון
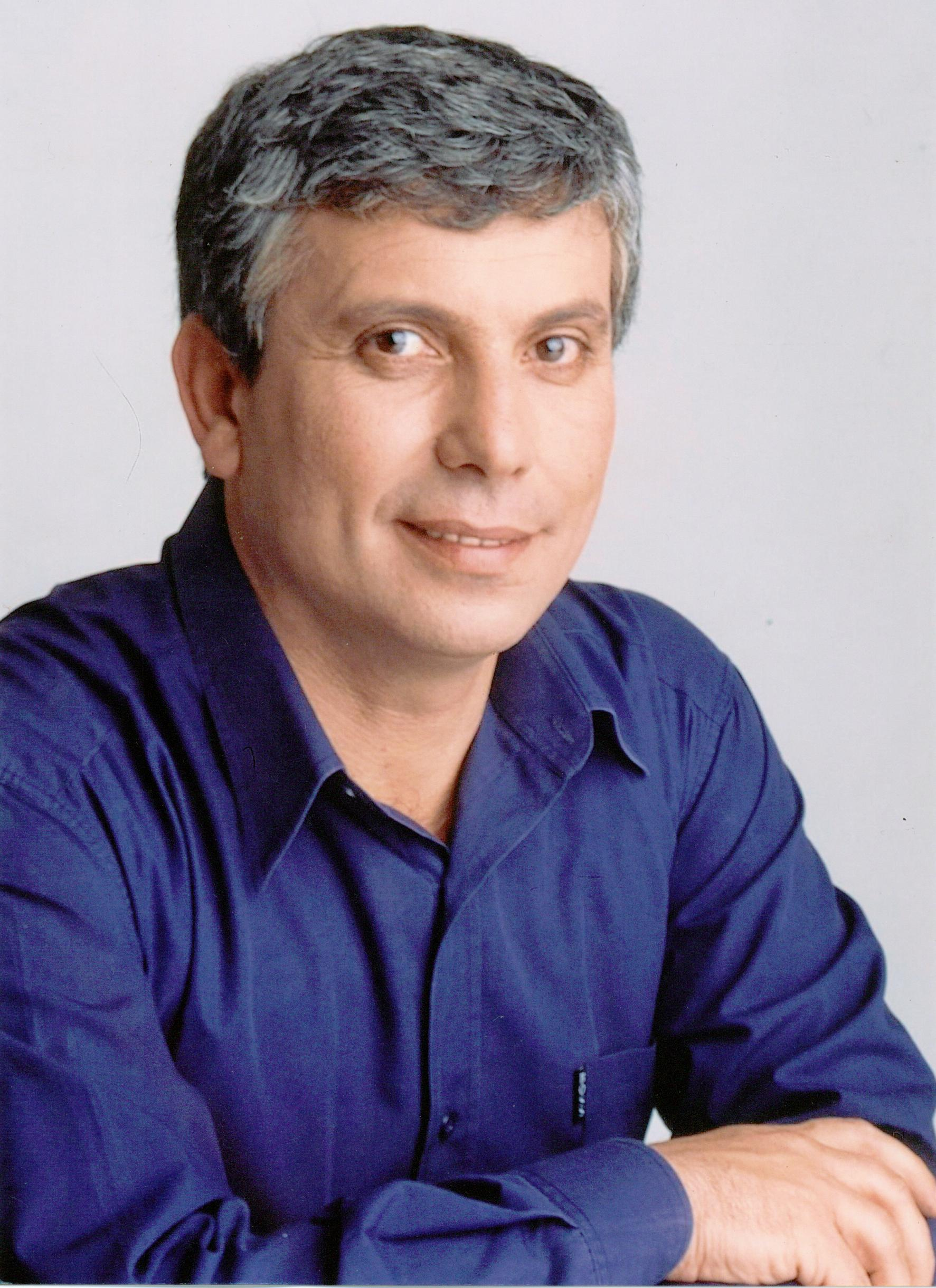

Ministerial roles
- 2001–2002: Minister of Agriculture
- 2005: Minister of the Environment
- 2006–2011: Minister of Agriculture
- 2011–2013: Minister of Industry, Trade & Labour
- 2011–2013: Minister of Minorities

Faction represented in the Knesset
- 1996–1999: Labor Party
- 1999–2001: One Israel
- 2001–2011: Labor Party
- 2011–2013: Independence

Personal details
- Born: 7 December 1956 (age 69) Kfar Saba, Israel

Shalom Simhon (Hebrew: שלום שמחון; born 7 December 1956) is an Israeli politician and former member of the Knesset for Independence and the Labor Party. He previously served as the Minister of Industry, Trade and Labour and Minister of Minorities in the Israeli cabinet.

== Biography ==
Born in Kfar Saba, after completing his national service, Simhon studied for a BA in social work, and became a social worker. He lives in Even Menachem, a moshav in the western Galilee, and was secretary general of the Moshavim Movement. He has also chaired the Social Department of the Moshavim Movement, the Youth Department of the Moshavim Movement (for which he was also secretary) and was secretary general of HaMerkaz HaHakla'i.

Simhon was first elected to the Knesset in the 1996 elections. He retained his seat in the 1999 elections, and was appointed Minister of Agriculture and Rural Development in Ariel Sharon's national unity government as well as serving as chairman of the Finance Committee. He served in the cabinet again during the 16th Knesset after Labour joined the government, this time as Minister of the Environment. In 2006 there was an investigation into whether he had received personal favours from an airline company, though he denied the claim.

After retaining his seat in the 2006 elections he was reappointed Minister of Agriculture and Rural Development. He retained his seat again in the 2009 elections, having been placed twelfth on the Labor list. In January 2011 he was one of five members to leave Labor to establish Independence, and was appointed Industry, Trade and Labour Minister, replacing Binyamin Ben-Eliezer. On 18 January he was also appointed Minister of Minorities. During his tenure as the Trade and Labor Minister, the ministry passed a law requiring retailers to clearly display food items whose price is regulated by the government. The ministry, following the initiative of Eitan Cabel, also made it easier for consumers to return items they purchased and get their money back.

He lost his Knesset seat in 2013 after Independence chose not to contest the elections.
