= Julis, Gaza =

Julis جولس
- Etymology: personal name
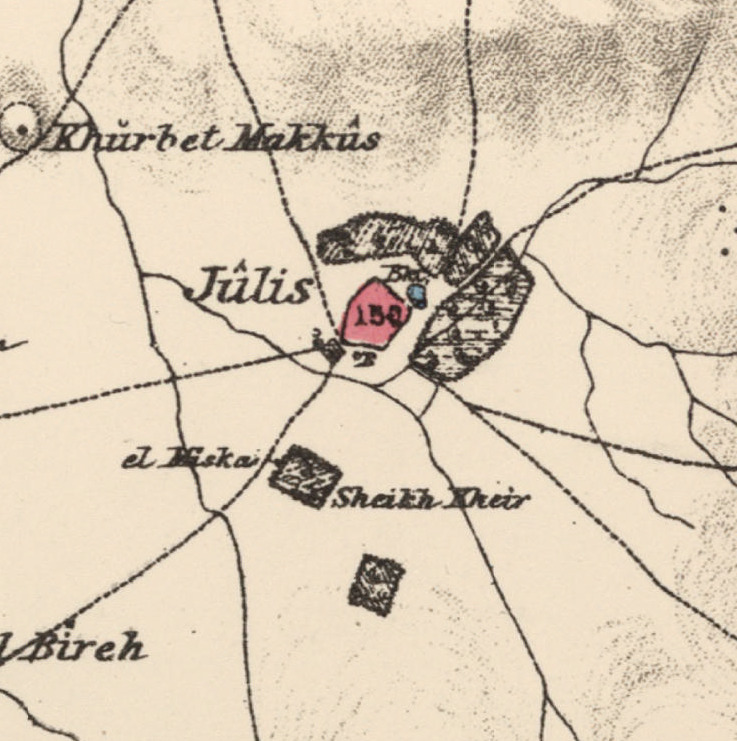
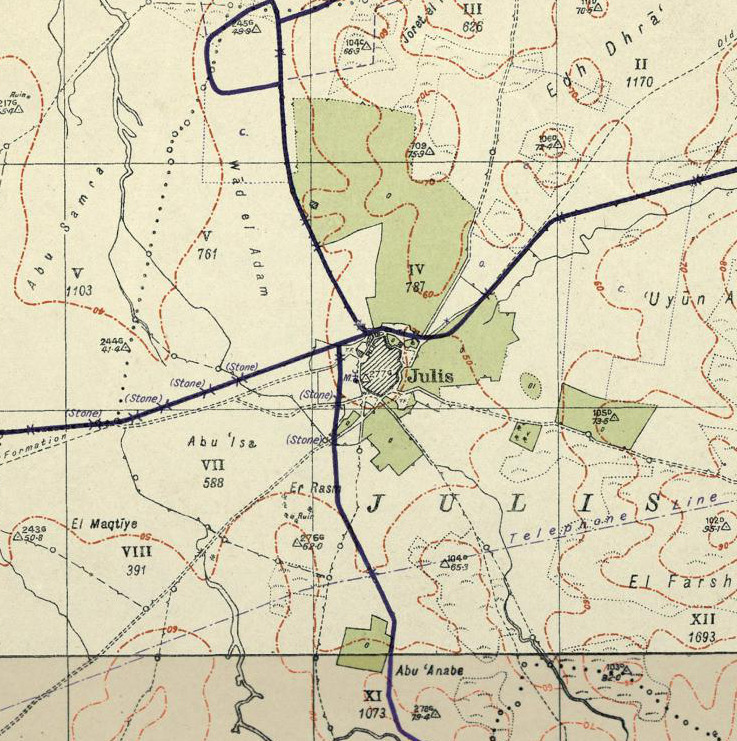
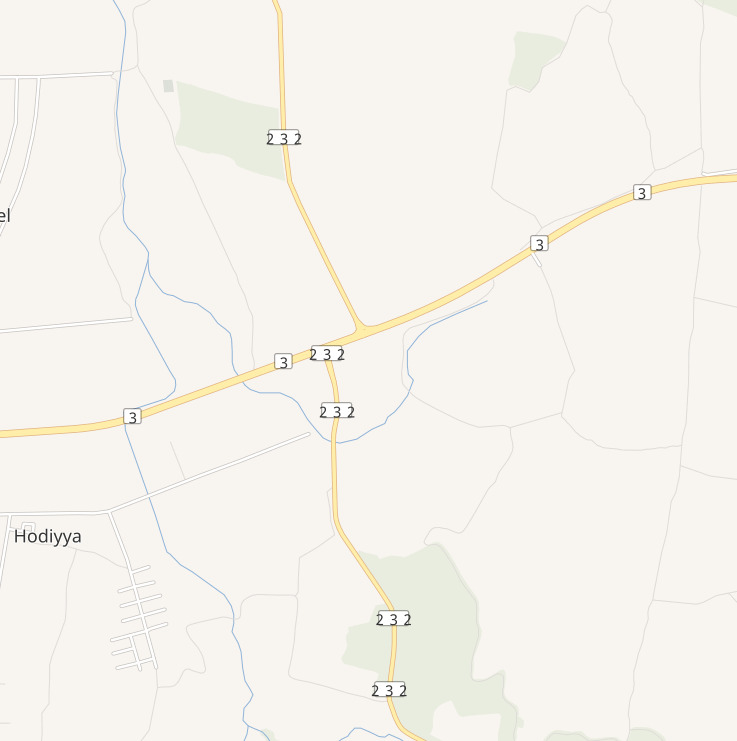
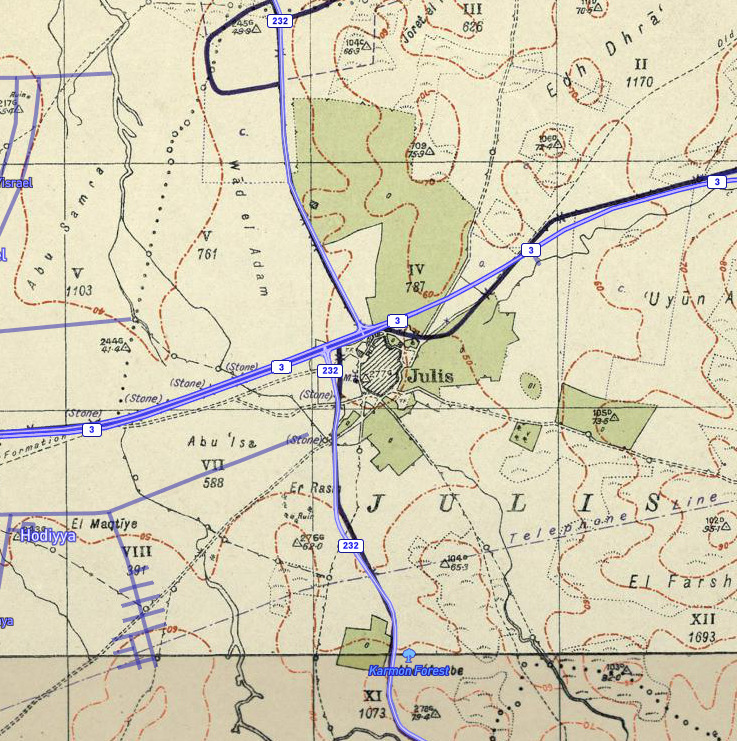
- 1870s map 1940s map modern map 1940s with modern overlay map A series of historical maps of the area around Julis, Gaza (click the buttons)

- Location within Mandatory Palestine
- Coordinates: 31°40′54″N 34°39′13″E
- Palestine grid: 117/121
- Geopolitical entity: Mandatory Palestine
- Subdistrict: Gaza
- Date of depopulation: June 11, 1948

Area
  - Total: 13,584 dunams (13.584 km^{2}; 5.245 sq mi)

Population (1945)
  - Total: 1,030
- Cause(s) of depopulation: Military assault by Yishuv forces
- Current Localities: Hodaya

Julis (Arabic: جولس) was a Palestinian Arab village in the Gaza Subdistrict, located 26.5 kilometers (16.5 mi) northeast of Gaza on a slight elevation along the southern coastal plain. In 1945, there were 1,030 inhabitants in the village. It was depopulated during the 1948 Arab-Israeli War.

== History ==
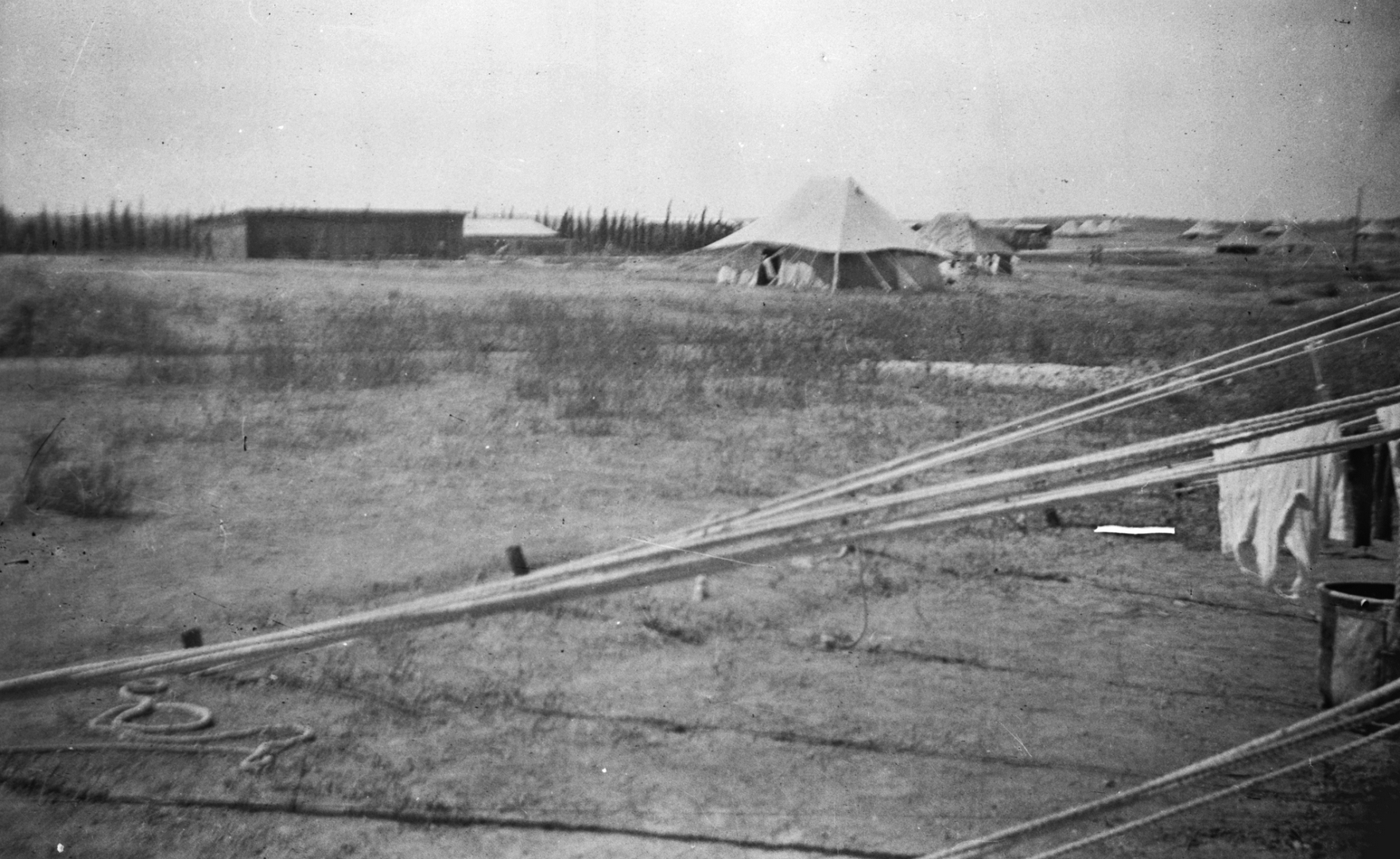
Australian camp, by Julis, in 1940

Julis was built on an archaeological site whose ancient name is unknown. Potsherds from the Mamluk era have been found in the village. The village had a Maqam (shrine) which was constructed with ancient materials.

Julis was inhabited in the 15th century. In 1472–1473 CE, Sultan Qaitbay endowed it for the benefit of his Jerusalem madrasa.

Grossman noted that a branch of the Jaradat tribe, originating from Sa'ir, settled in Julis.

=== Ottoman Empire ===
Julis was incorporated into the Ottoman Empire in 1517 with the rest of Palestine. In first Ottoman tax register of 1526/7 the village was unpopulated. By 1596 CE, however, the village had been refounded as part of the nahiya of Gaza, in the Liwa of Gaza. It consisted of 204 persons (37 households), all Muslims. They paid a fixed tax-rate of 33,3 % on agricultural products, including wheat, barley, fruit, beehives, vineyards and goats; a total of 10,400 akçe. 6,5/24 of the revenue went to a Waqf.

Marom and Taxel have shown that during the seventeenth to eighteenth centuries, nomadicpressures led to settlement abandonment in the southern coastal plain. The population of abandoned villages moved to surviving settlements, while the lands of abandoned settlements continued to be cultivated by neighboring villages. Thus, Julis absorbed the lands of Bardagha, mentioned as an inhabited village in the Ottoman tax registers of the 16th century.

In 1838, Julis was noted as a village in the District of Gaza.

In 1863 Victor Guérin found the village to be located on a hillock and containing five hundred inhabitants. It had a oualy, dedicated to Scheik Mohammed, was internally decorated with two fragments. Guérin further noted that "Several marble columns are laid across the mouth of the well, with furniture arranged around it."

An Ottoman village list of about 1870 indicated 101 houses and a population of 307, though the population count included only men.

In 1882, the PEF's Survey of Western Palestine described Julis as mostly built of adobe brick structures, and it had a well to the south, and a pool surrounded by gardens to the northeast.

=== British Mandate ===
In the 1922 census of Palestine, conducted by the British Mandate authorities, Jules had a population of 481 Muslims, increasing in the 1931 census to 682, still all Muslims, in 165 houses.

The village was laid out in a square, sandwiched between the two highways and bounded at one end by the traffic circle where they intersected. Its adobe and cement houses were constructed close together. The village had a mosque, and a shrine dedicated to Shaykh Khayr. According to local tradition, Khayr was a Muslim soldier killed fighting against the Crusaders. Village shops were scattered along the highway and in 1937 a school was opened; it had an enrollment of 86 students in the mid-1940s. Underground water was abundant in Julis and was used for domestic methods.

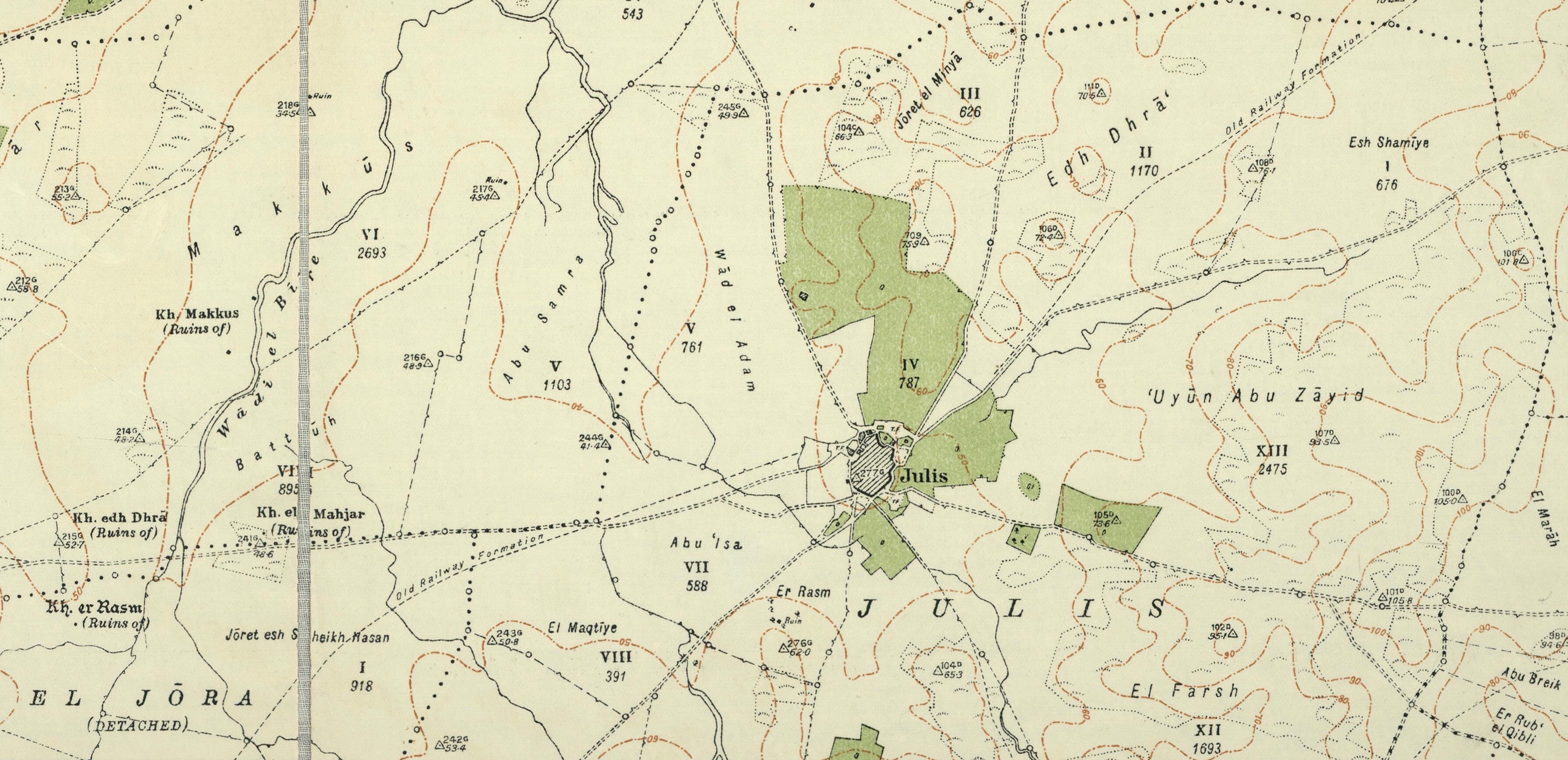
Julis 1930 1:20,000

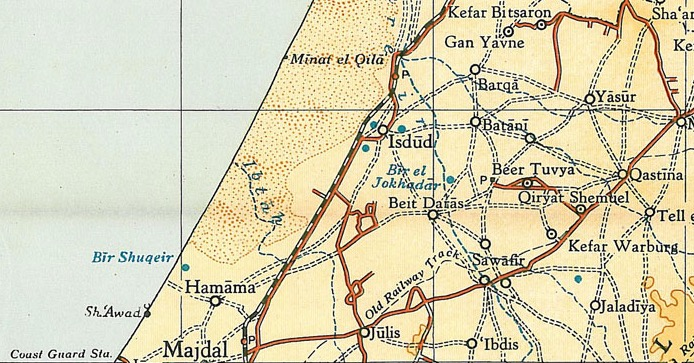
Julis 1945 1:250,000 (botton centre)

During World War II, the British authorities built a highway that passed through Julis parallel and feeding traffic to the coastal highway. The road also intersected at the village with the highway leading from al-Majdal (Ashkelon) to the Jerusalem–Jaffa highway. This gave the village importance as a transportation center. The British also constructed a military camp in Julis to control the junction.

In the 1945 statistics Julis had a population of 1,030 Muslims, with a total of 13,584 dunams of land, according to an official land and population survey. Of this, 1,360 dunams were used for citrus and bananas, 931 for plantations and irrigable land, 10,803 for cereals, while 30 dunams were built-up land.

In addition to agriculture, residents practiced animal husbandry which formed was an important source of income for the town. In 1943, they owned 278 heads of cattle, 346 sheep over a year old, 138 goats over a year old, 35 camels, 5 horses, 14 mules, 114 donkeys, 1010 fowls, and 776 pigeons.

=== State of Israel ===
On May 27–28, 1948, the Givati Brigade's First Battalion captured a military barracks in Julis during Operation Barak, but failed to gain control of the village itself. Egyptian forces attempted to recapture it almost immediately. According to the History of the Haganah, "The defenders of the place [Givati forces] blocked enemy units which tried... to infiltrate the barracks from the direction of the village of Julis." The Haganah account says that Julis was captured on June 11, as the Givati's Third Battalion mounted a number of operations to occupy a number of villages before the first truce of the war took place. However, in Gamal Abdel Nasser's memoirs, he recalled the maneuvers having taken place soon after the truce came into effect.

At the end of the truce, Julis became one of the many main positions the Egyptians failed to recapture. The Egyptian Army's Sixth Battalion which Nasser was chief of staff of, was ordered to take back the position. In later years, Nasser was very critical of the operation's planning, writing "Once again we were a facing a battle for which we had no preparation. We had no information about the enemy at Julis." In the few hours before his unit was to move towards Julis, Nasser organized a quick reconnaissance of the position. During the course of the battle, his commanding officer ordered him to participate in the actual fighting, leaving his unit without direction or coordination. After getting hold of a few aerial photographs of the village, Nasser convinced his commander that "even if we had succeeded in entering Julis... it would have turned into a cemetery for our forces." He argued that Julis was indefensible without the barracks which overlooked it. On July 10, after many Egyptian casualties, the battle was called off. According to the Haganah, the Givati units repulsed an Egyptian attack in which no Israeli soldier was injured. A close colleague of Nasser, Isma'il Mohieddin was killed during the battle.

Following the war the area was incorporated into the State of Israel and the moshav of Hodaya was established on village lands southwest of the village site in 1949. According to Palestinian historian Walid Khalidi, "Only a few houses remain. Most of them are made of cement, and have simple architectural features: flat roofs and rectangular doors and windows. One has two storeys and another has an 'illiyya. (A guest room on the top floor.) One house, in the southwestern section of the site, is occupied by Jewish residents."

== Bibliography ==
- Barron, J.B., ed. (1923). Palestine: Report and General Abstracts of the Census of 1922. Government of Palestine.
- Conder, C.R.; Kitchener, H.H. (1882). The Survey of Western Palestine: Memoirs of the Topography, Orography, Hydrography, and Archaeology. Vol. 2. London: Committee of the Palestine Exploration Fund.
- Dauphin, C. (1998). La Palestine byzantine, Peuplement et Populations. BAR International Series 726 (in French). Vol. III : Catalogue. Oxford: Archeopress. ISBN 0-860549-05-4.
- Government of Palestine, Department of Statistics (1945). Village Statistics, April, 1945.
- Guérin, V. (1869). Description Géographique Historique et Archéologique de la Palestine (in French). Vol. 1: Judee, pt. 2. Paris: L'Imprimerie Nationale.
- Hadawi, S. (1970). Village Statistics of 1945: A Classification of Land and Area ownership in Palestine. Palestine Liberation Organization Research Center.
- Hartmann, M. (1883). "Die Ortschaftenliste des Liwa Jerusalem in dem türkischen Staatskalender für Syrien auf das Jahr 1288 der Flucht (1871)". Zeitschrift des Deutschen Palästina-Vereins. 6: 102–149.
- Hütteroth, W.-D.; Abdulfattah, K. (1977). Historical Geography of Palestine, Transjordan and Southern Syria in the Late 16th Century. Erlanger Geographische Arbeiten, Sonderband 5. Erlangen, Germany: Vorstand der Fränkischen Geographischen Gesellschaft. ISBN 3-920405-41-2.
- Khalidi, W. (1992). All That Remains: The Palestinian Villages Occupied and Depopulated by Israel in 1948. Washington D.C.: Institute for Palestine Studies. ISBN 0-88728-224-5.
- Mills, E., ed. (1932). Census of Palestine 1931. Population of Villages, Towns and Administrative Areas. Jerusalem: Government of Palestine.
- Lifshits, Vladik (2014-09-28). "Julis Final Report" (126). Hadashot Arkheologiyot – Excavations and Surveys in Israel.
- Morris, B. (2004). The Birth of the Palestinian Refugee Problem Revisited. Cambridge University Press. ISBN 978-0-521-00967-6.
- Nasser, G.A. (1955/1973): "Memoirs" in Journal of Palestine Studies
  - “Memoirs of the First Palestine War” in 2, no. 2 (Win. 73): 3-32, pdf-file, downloadable
- Palmer, E.H. (1881). The Survey of Western Palestine: Arabic and English Name Lists Collected During the Survey by Lieutenants Conder and Kitchener, R. E. Transliterated and Explained by E.H. Palmer. Committee of the Palestine Exploration Fund.
- Robinson, E.; Smith, E. (1841). Biblical Researches in Palestine, Mount Sinai and Arabia Petraea: A Journal of Travels in the year 1838. Vol. 3. Boston: Crocker & Brewster.
- Socin, A. (1879). "Alphabetisches Verzeichniss von Ortschaften des Paschalik Jerusalem". Zeitschrift des Deutschen Palästina-Vereins. 2: 135–163.
