= Hodiya =

Moshav in southern Israel

Hodiya: הודיה (Hebrew)
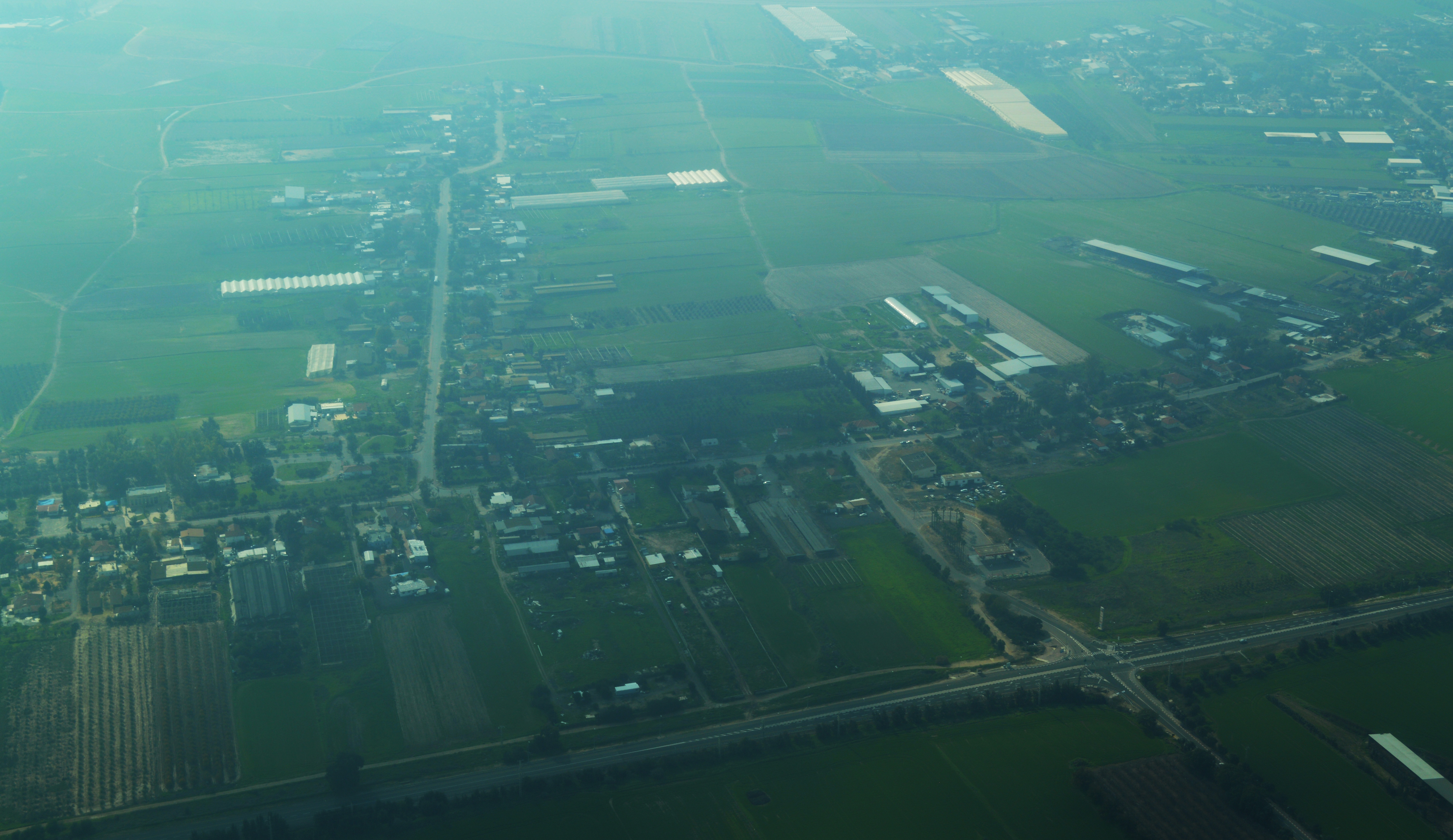

- Location within Ashkelon region of Israel
- Coordinates: 31°40′23″N 34°38′25″E
- Country: Israel
- District: Southern
- Subdistrict: Ashkelon
- Council: Hof Ashkelon
- Affiliation: Moshavim Movement
- Founded: 1949
- Founder: Indian immigrants
- Population (2024): 887

Hodiya (Hebrew: הוֹדִיָּה) is a moshav in southern Israel. Located near Ashkelon, it falls under the jurisdiction of Hof Ashkelon Regional Council. In 2024 it had a population of 887.

== History ==
The moshav was founded in 1949 by immigrants from India, on the land of the depopulated Palestinian village of Julis. Today most of the residents are immigrants, or descendants of immigrants from Iran and Yemen.
