= Michael Eitan =

Israeli politician (1944–2024)

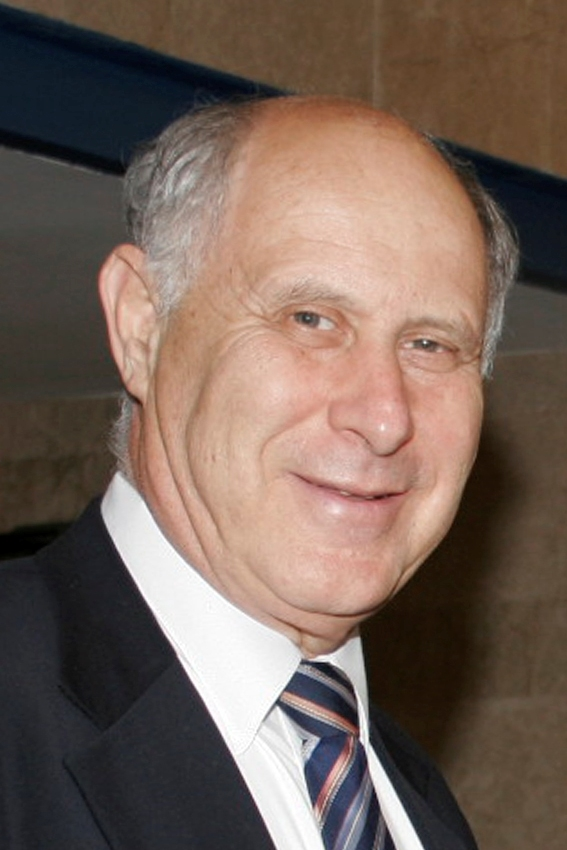
- Eitan in 2008

Ministerial roles
- 1997–1998: Minister of Science & Technology
- 2009–2013: Minister of Improvement of Government Services

Faction represented in the Knesset
- 1984–2013: Likud

Personal details
- Born: 6 March 1944 Tel Aviv, Mandatory Palestine
- Died: 8 November 2024 (aged 80)

Michael Eitan (Hebrew: מיכאל איתן; 6 March 1944 – 8 November 2024) was an Israeli politician. A member of the Knesset for Likud from 1984 until 2013 and a sharp critic of Benjamin Netanyahu, he also served as Minister of Science & Technology between July 1997 and July 1998 and Minister of Improvement of Government Services from 2009 until 2013.

== Life and career ==
Michael "Miki" Eitan was born in Tel Aviv during the Mandate era. He studied law at Tel Aviv University. He joined the Herut party, and was chairman of its youth guard before becoming a member of the party's central committee and chairman of its Ramat Gan branch.

Eitan was elected to the Knesset on the Likud list (within which Herut was a faction until 1988) in 1984, and was re-elected in 1988, 1992 and 1996, becoming coalition chairman after the latter election, having been co-ordinator of the opposition between 1992 and 1996. In 1997, Eitan was co-author of the Beilin-Eitan Agreement presented to Abu Mazen (Mahmoud Abbas). In July 1997 he was appointed Minister of Science & Technology, but was replaced by Silvan Shalom in July the following year. He then served as a Deputy Minister in the Prime Minister's Office until the 1999 elections. During the Knesset term he chaired its sub-committee on communication and information and helped establish the Knesset's website.

Although he retained his seat in the 1999 elections, they were won by the Labor Party-led One Israel alliance and Eitan lost his place in the cabinet. He was re-elected in 2003, 2006 and 2009, after which he briefly served as temporary Knesset speaker due to him being the longest-serving MK alongside Binyamin Ben-Eliezer. He was later appointed Minister of Improvement of Government Services. He did not contest the 2013 elections.

In December 2016, Eitan was diagnosed with Parkinson's disease, which by 2021, had made him unable to function alone. In February 2021, he underwent a deep brain stimulation procedure at Hadassah Medical Center in Jerusalem, which greatly improved his condition and enabled him to lead a normal life again.

Eitan one of the founders of Kokhav Ya'ir. He died on 8 November 2024 at the age of 80.
