= Orit Noked =

Israeli politician (born 1952)

- אורית נוקד
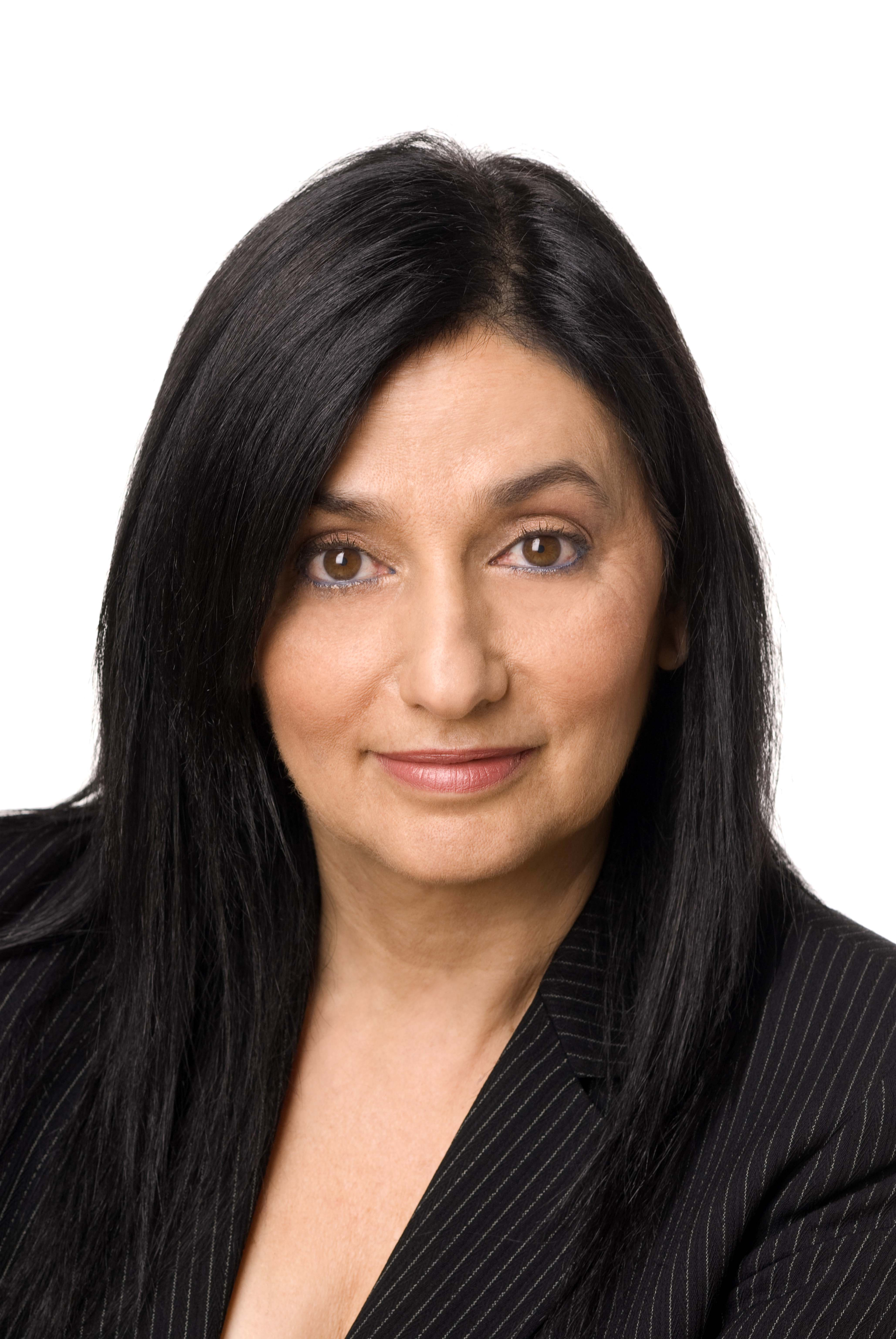

Ministerial roles
- 2011–2013: Minister of Agriculture and Rural Development

Faction represented in the Knesset
- 2002–2011: Labor Party
- 2011–2013: Independence

Personal details
- Born: 25 October 1952 (age 72); Jerusalem, Israel

Orit Noked (Hebrew: אורית נוקד; born 25 October 1952) is an Israeli politician who served as a member of the Knesset for Independence and the Labor Party and as Minister of Agriculture.

== Biography ==
Born in Jerusalem in 1952, Noked studied law at the Hebrew University of Jerusalem. She became a legal advisor to the Kibbutz Movement in 1986, a job she held until 1992. Between 1996 and 2002 she served as director of the movement's legal department. She has also been a member of the Jewish National Fund's directorate, the Agricultural Association's secretariat, the National Council for Environmental Quality and the board of the Israel Lands Authority.

In the 1999 elections Noked stood as a Labour candidate within the One Israel list. Although she did not win a high enough spot for a Knesset seat in the party primaries, she entered the Knesset in August 2002 as a replacement for former Foreign Minister Shlomo Ben-Ami. She retained her seat in the 2003 elections, and briefly served as Deputy Minister of the Vice Premier under Shimon Peres between January and November 2005. In the run-up to the 2006 elections she won 17th place on Labour's list (a slot reserved for kibbutz members - Noked lives in kibbutz Shefayim). With the party winning 19 seats, she retained her seat and served as a member of the influential Finance Committee.

She retained her seat in the 2009 elections after winning thirteenth place on the Labor list. Orit Noked served as Deputy Minister of Industry, Trade, and Labor from April 2009 until January 2011. In January 2011 she was one of five MKs to leave the party to establish Independence, and was appointed Minister of Agriculture and Rural Development. She lost her seat in 2013 when the party chose not to contest the elections.

Noked is married with three children.
