= Matan Vilnai =

Israeli politician (born 1944)

Matan Vilnai מתן וילנאי
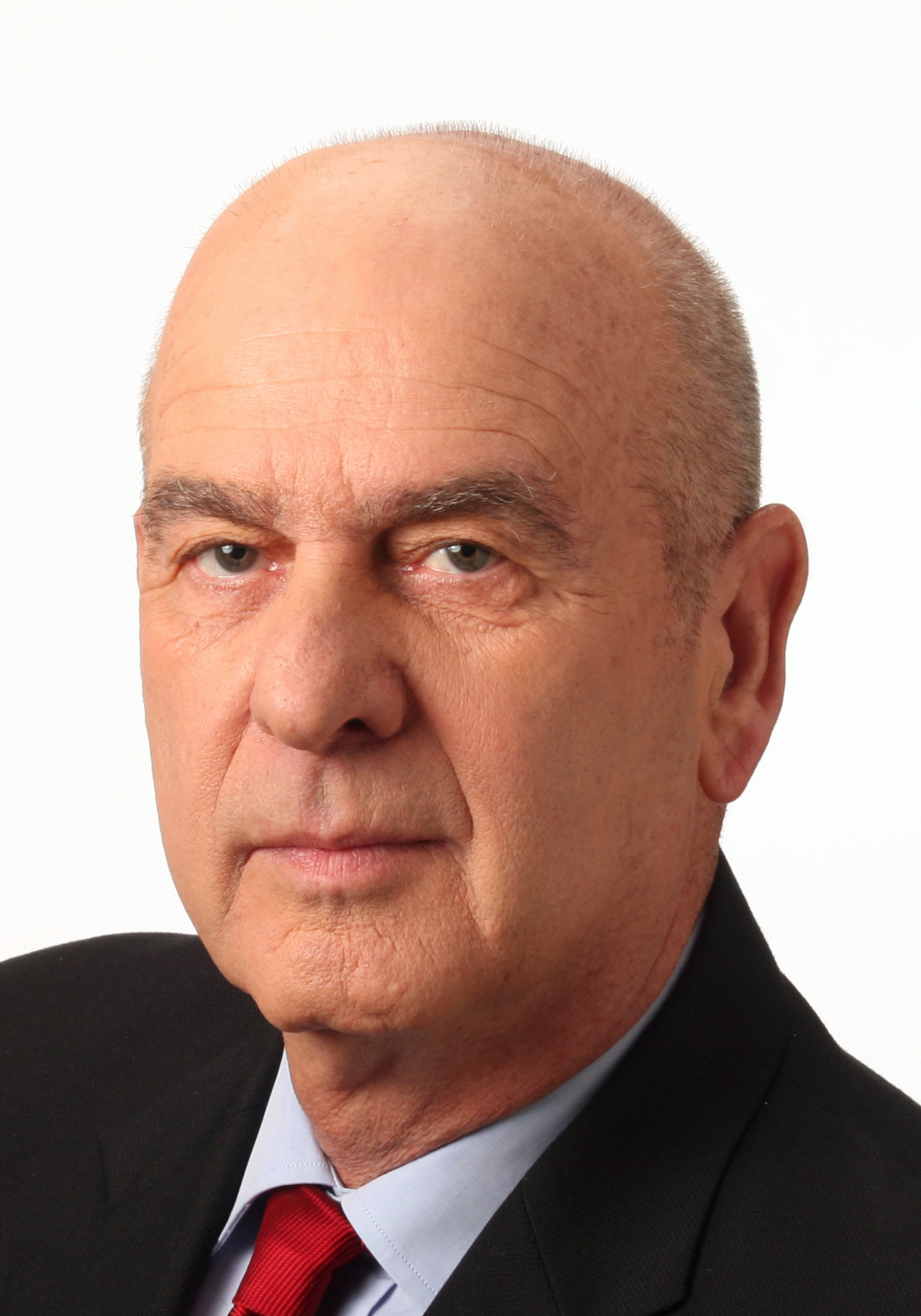
- Vilnai in 2008

Ministerial roles
- 1999–2002: Minister of Science, Culture & Sport
- 2005: Minister in the Prime Minister's Office
- 2005: Minister of Science and Technology
- 2011–2012: Minister for Home Front Defense

Faction represented in the Knesset
- 1999: One Israel
- 2003–2011: Labor Party
- 2011–2012: Independence

Other roles
- 2012–2017: Ambassador to China

Personal details
- Born: 20 May 1944 (age 82) Jerusalem, Mandatory Palestine
- Parents: Zev Vilnay (father); Esther Vilnay (mother)

Matan Vilnai (Hebrew: מַתָּן וִילְנָאִי; born 20 May 1944) is an Israeli politician and a former major general in the Israel Defense Forces (IDF). A former Knesset member and government minister, he was appointed ambassador to China in 2012. Since 2017 Vilnai serves as the president of the Israel-Asia Chamber of Commerce.

== Biography ==
Matan Vilnai was born in Jerusalem. His father was Prof. Zev Vilnay, a pioneer in the sphere of Israeli geography and Land of Israel studies, from whom he inherited a love of nature and hiking. Matan graduated from the Hebrew Reali School in 1962 and was drafted into the IDF, serving in the Paratroopers Brigade and the elite reconnaissance unit Sayeret Matkal. He holds a B.A. in history from Tel Aviv University.

Vilnai lives in Mevasseret Zion and is married with three children.

== Military career ==
Vilnai was deputy commander of the assault force in Operation Thunderbolt, also known as the Entebbe Raid, to free Jewish and Israeli passengers taken hostage by Palestinian and German terrorists after their Air France plane was hijacked to Entebbe, Uganda. Vilnai led the assault team into the airport building, while another team secured the outside. As a major general, Vilnai was the head of the Manpower Directorate, as well as the Deputy Chief of Staff.

== Political career ==
In the run up to the 1999 elections Vilnai joined the Labor Party (which was running as part of the One Israel alliance), and won a place on its Knesset list. Ehud Barak appointed him Minister of Science, Culture and Sport. Vilnai gave up his Knesset seat six months after the election (he was replaced by Colette Avital), but remained a minister. After Ariel Sharon beat Barak in the 2001 election for Prime Minister, Vilnai was reappointed to his post in the new government.

He re-entered the Knesset after the 2003 elections second on Labor's list, but lost his ministerial post as Sharon formed a right-wing coalition that excluded Labor. However, when several parties left the coalition in the face of the disengagement plan, Labor was invited into the government in January 2005. Vilnai was initially appointed Minister in the Prime Minister's Office. In August 2005 he was appointed Acting Minister of Science and Technology, and the post was made permanent in November.

In the run-up to the 2006 elections, Vilnai competed in the election for Labor Party leader alongside Shimon Peres and Binyamin Ben-Eliezer, but was beaten by Amir Peretz. However, he did retain his Knesset seat in the elections, placing 11th on Labor's list.

After Barak won the party leadership election in 2007 he appointed Vilnai as Deputy Minister of Defense.

In February 2008, whilst Israeli airstrikes in Gaza were ongoing, during interview on Army Radio, Vilnai threatened that Gazan Palestinians "will bring upon themselves a bigger shoah (lit. 'holocaust') because we will use all our might to defend ourselves." A spokesman for Vilnai said he used the word in the sense of "disaster", saying "he did not mean to make any allusion to [the] genocide."

Vilnai won sixth place on the Labor list for the 2009 elections, and retained his seat in the subsequent election. In 2011 he was one of the five members to leave the Labor Party to establish Independence, and was appointed to the newly created post of Minister for the Home Front, having originally been made Minister of Minorities.

== Diplomatic career ==
In February 2012 Vilnai was appointed Israel's ambassador to China. His Knesset seat was taken by Shachiv Shnaan. Vilnai served in office until January 2017. Vilnai serves since 2018 as the President of the Israel-Asia Chamber of Commerce.
