= Minorities Minister of Israel =

Ministry of Minorities
- משרד המיעוטים
- Emblem of Israel

Agency overview
- Formed: 1948
- Dissolved: 1949
- Jurisdiction: Government of Israel

The Minister of Minorities is a member of the Israeli cabinet. The post was resurrected in 1999, as a ministerial responsibility under a Minister without portfolio, after having previously existed as an independent office in the provisional government between 1948 and 1949 (as the Minister of Minority Affairs).

== History ==
The Ministry of Minority Affairs was founded after independence, and was the only new ministry not based on Yishuv institutions. The ministerial post was held by Bechor-Shalom Sheetrit, an Arabic speaker who was popular with the country's Arab population. Sheetrit attempted to promote integration and equality, but was hamstrung by the Military Government, which controlled most Arab areas after the 1948 Arab-Israeli War, as well as Prime Minister David Ben-Gurion, who vetoed Sheetrit's proposal for an Arab advisory council in the ministry.

Following disagreements with the Ministry of Religions and the Military government (which controlled most Arab areas after the war had ended), the Ministry of Minority Affairs was closed in 1949. Following its closure, Arab-related matters were handled by an advisor on Arab affairs in the Prime Minister's Office. During the unity governments that lasted from 1984 until 1990, responsibility for Israeli Arab affairs was given to a Minister without Portfolio; Ezer Weizman (Yahad/Alignment), Moshe Arens (Likud) and Ehud Olmert (Likud).

On 18 June 1996 Moshe Katsav, then deputy Prime Minister, was also appointed as "Minister for Israeli Arab Affairs". During the 27th government, Matan Vilnai served as Chairman of the Ministerial Committee for Arab-Israeli affairs. In the 29th government, Salah Tarif, a Druze, served as a Minister in the Prime Minister's Office with the responsibility on Minorities Affairs. In the 32nd government, Avishay Braverman, a Minister without Portfolio, was also responsible for Minorities Affairs until 17 January 2011 when he resigned.

== List of ministers ==
#	Minister	Party	Government	Term start	Term end
Minister for Minority Affairs
1	Bechor-Shalom Sheetrit	Sephardim and Oriental Communities	P	12 April 1948	8 March 1949
Minister appointed over the Arab Sector
2	Moshe Katsav	Likud	27	18 June 1996	6 July 1999
Minister in the Prime Minister's Office with responsibility for Minorities Affairs
3	Salah Tarif	Labor Party	29	7 March 2001	29 January 2002
Minister of Minorities
4	Avishay Braverman	Labor Party	32	31 March 2009	17 January 2011
