= Avishay Braverman =

Israeli economist and politician (born 1948)

- אבישי ברוורמן
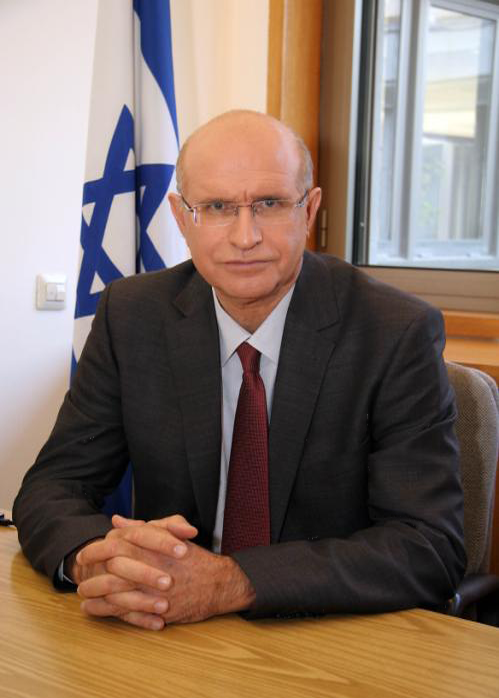

Minister of Minorities
- In office 2009–2011

Faction represented in the Knesset
- 2006–2015: Labor Party

Personal details
- Born: 15 January 1948 (age 78) Ramat Gan, Mandatory Palestine

Avishay Braverman (Hebrew: אבישי ברוורמן; born 15 January 1948) is an economics professor, politician, and Israeli public figure. Having held senior positions as economist at the World Bank, he was later elected as fifth president of the Ben-Gurion University of the Negev (1990–2006). As a Knesset member on behalf of the Labor Party (2006–2015) he served as Minister of Minority Affairs, Chairman of the Knesset Finance Committee and Chairman of the Knesset Economic Affairs Committee. He is the Israel Prize laureate in 2020 for Lifetime Achievement, for his work as president of Ben-Gurion University.

== Biography ==
Avishay Braverman was born in Ramat Gan, then Mandatory Palestine. His Polish-born father Jacob Braverman was a carpenter and his mother Sarah, a native of Lithuania, a kindergarten teacher. Braverman graduated from "Blich" High School in Ramat Gan, where he also served as captain of the basketball team. In 1968, he graduated with a bachelor's degree in Economics and Statistics from Tel Aviv University, summa cum laude as part of the Academic Reserve (Atuda) and later served as system analyst, with the rank of Lieutenant. He studied for a master's degree at Tel Aviv University and a Ph.D. in economics from Stanford University, California, under the guidance of Professor Joseph Stiglitz.

Upon receiving his Ph.D. in 1976, he joined he World Bank in Washington, D.C. and served there for 14 years as senior economist and division chief. During those years, he led policy, research and development programs in South America, Africa, Asia, the Middle East and Eastern Europe. In his final role, he was entrusted with the Bank's agricultural policies. During these years, he published numerous articles and edited several books dealing with topics related to development economics, agricultural economics, industrial organization, public policy and resource and water resource management.

=== Ben-Gurion University of the Negev ===
In October 1990, he returned to Israel to serve as president of the Ben-Gurion University of the Negev, then a small university with approximately 5,700 students. In his first speech, he announced that the university would grow significantly on the basis of three principles: excellence in research, opening its doors to disadvantaged populations, and building a hi-tech park adjacent to the university.

His tenure was characterized by a great building momentum on the university's three campuses in Beer Sheva, Sde Boker and later, Eilat, and the initiation and establishment of many curricula and research programs, including: the Kreitman School of Advanced Graduate Studies; the National Institute of Biotechnology in the Negev, sponsored by the de Picciotto Family; the Ilse Katz Institute for Nanoscale Science and Technology; the reconfiguration of the Jacob Blaustein Institute for Desert Research (BIDR) in Sde Boker which transformed under the renamed Institutes to incorporate three research institutes, among them, the Zuckerberg Institute for Water Research (ZIWR), as well as the Albert Katz International School for Desert Studies; and on the Marcus Family Campus in Beer-Sheva, the Heksherim Research Institute for Jewish & Israeli Literature & Culture; further development and naming of the unique Joyce and Irvine Goldman School of Medicine, founded by the School's first Dean and first University President, the late Professor Moshe Prywes; establishing the Medical School for International Health (MSIH) in collaboration with Columbia University; the School of Management, later named the Guilford Glazer Faculty of Business and Management; the Department of Computer Science; the Department for Computer Systems Engineering; the Pilots Training Course - a full undergraduate degree program for Israeli Air Force cadets in a combined Flight School and university setting, among others.

With a focus on community outreach and inspiring the city and region's populations to become an integral part of the university, under Braverman's tenure, the Robert H. Arnow Center for Bedouin Studies and Development was established, as was a socially-engaged complex designed to house the Department for Community Action sponsored by the Deichmann Family of Germany, to develop the university's social outreach with Jewish and Bedouin residents of Beer Sheva and the region, together with the Spitzer Department of Social Work. In addition, the Mandel Center for Leadership in the Negev was established in Beer Sheva.

Braverman enlisted extensive support from both private and governmental sources, to include in particular a fund to promote excellence in research named after Howard and Lotti Marcus worth approximately $450 million; and a grant from the German government for the Jacob Blaustein Institutes for Desert Research in Sde Boker; initiating the establishment of an hi-tech park in an area adjacent to the university, as well as attracting the communications giant, Deutsche Telekom, to establish its first research facility outside of Germany at BGU. During his tenure, BGU engaged in various cooperative projects around the world and particularly in the Middle East, with Morocco, Egypt, Jordan, the Palestinian Authority and the Gaza Strip, and UNESCO endorsed the BGU-initiated International Program for Arid Land Crops - the first such recognition of Israeli expertise by a UN organization. He also raised significant funds for the construction of the Beer-Sheva North/University train station and thé Mexico Bridge, connecting the university and the Advanced Technologies Park with central Israel. At the end of his tenure, there were approximately 18,000 students studying at the university, including 400 students from the Bedouin community in the Negev.

Between 1991 and 2005, he served as Chair of the Committee of University Heads (CUH) three times, was a member of the Public Committee for Election of Bank Directors (1993), served as Chairman of the Jerusalem Literary Award Committee (2003), Chairman of the Reserve Reform Committee appointed by the Minister of Defence (2005) ) and external director of Mackhteshim-Agan (now "Adama"), Israel Corporation, IDB Development and Dead Sea Works.

The Water Sector Report

In 1991, the World Bank initiated a series of studies to assess water needs in countries surrounding the Jordan Basin. The Israeli part of the research was entrusted to Prof. Avishay Braverman. The study involved various Israeli entities including the Israel Water Planning Authority, the Ministry of Defense and leading water experts in Israel and was managed by Nehemiah Hassid. The study's conclusions were submitted to the World Bank in August 1994 and recommended the development of seawater desalination and wastewater purification technology, in order to meet the water needs of Israel and the West Bank territories in accordance with the expected population growth. To date, this report has almost been fully implemented. It has also served water planners and those negotiating with the Kingdom of Jordan and the Palestinians.

Political career

In January 2006, Braverman joined the Labor Party and was elected as a member to the 17th Knesset. He served as a member of the Finance and Economic Affairs Committee and as Chairman of the Lobby for Retirees, and from July 23, 2008, until the end of the 17th Knesset term, served as Chairman of the Knesset's Finance Committee. Under his leadership, the committee approved the "Savers security net" as an appendage to dealing with the erosion in retirees’ savings and caring for Israeli pensioners.

Following elections for the 18th Knesset, Braverman was appointed Minister for Minority Affairs in the 32nd government. In this role, Braverman highlighted the promotion of economic initiatives and economic development amongst the minority populations in Israel. In 2010, he initiated and submitted for government approval a multi-annual plan totaling 800 million NIS, the purpose of which was to promote economic initiative, infrastructure and development in Arab communities. Braverman promoted a program for allocation of 305 million NIS to Arab students and the granting of 1,600 scholarships to outstanding Bedouin students, invested in the promotion of research laboratories in Arab communities and assisted in establishing a national research and development center for the Druze population in Israel. Braverman also sought to include 40% of the Israeli minority population in the national priority map.

On January 17, 2011, he resigned as minister following the resignation of Ehud Barak from the Labor Party and the party's resignation from the coalition.

In 2013, he was appointed chairman of the Knesset Economic Affairs Committee, which put the natural gas monopoly on the agenda and demanded that the Commissioner of Restraint of Trade impose price controls on gas prices. Braverman was responsible for reforms in trade and industry, transport, communications, consumer protection and more. He also raised awareness for the need for long-term economic planning, the need for building industrial educational frameworks and the integration of all levels of the population into the labor market. Braverman advocated "enlightened capitalism" which emphasizes growth with fair distribution of income.

Prior to the March 2015 20th Knesset elections, Braverman announced that he would not run for another term and retired from political life.

== Israel Prize ==
Professor Braverman is the 2020 Israel Prize laureate for Lifetime Achievement - a special contribution to society and state - for his contributions as President of Ben-Gurion University of the Negev.

In their deliberations for awarding the prize, the judges stated that "The academic community conceived by Braverman, his participation in its design and the raising of funds for its establishment, accelerated the development of the city of Beer-Sheva and the entire Negev… Today Beer-Sheva is a metropolitan area amalgamating cities and satellite towns, and at its center, the University, Soroka University Medical Center and the Advanced Technologies Park, where leading international companies operate in the field of information security and other technologies. Neighborhoods offering high-quality housing have been built around the university, a fact which has even contributed to the increase in real estate value in Beer-Sheva"..

Family

Avishay Braverman is married to architect Yael Braverman and is the father of two sons.

== Prizes and awards ==
- Israel Prize laureate for Lifetime Achievement - 2020
- Membership in the European Academy of Sciences and Arts. The European academy bestowed upon him In November 2017, the Ring of Tolerance for his life work in Academia and Politics with Arabs, Muslims and Christians, in Israel and beyond.
- Commander of the French Order of Academic Palms.
- Honorary Doctorate from the Jewish Theological Seminary
- Honorary Doctorate from Rand Afrikaans University
- Honorary citizen of Beer-Sheva.
- Ben-Gurion Prize
- Quality in Government Prize in the State of Israel

== Selected publications ==
- K. Hoff, A. Braverman and J.E. Stiglitz (eds.) The Economics of Rural Organization: Theory, Practice and Policy, Oxford University Press 1993, 589 pp.
- A. Braverman and J.E. Stiglitz, "Sharecropping and the Interlinking of Agrarian Markets", American Economic Review, Vol. 72, No. 4, pp. 695–715, 1982
- A. Braverman and J.L. Guasch, "Rural Credit Markets and Institutions in Developing Countries: Lessons for Policy Analysis from Practice and Modern Theory", World Development, Vol. 14, pp. 1253–1267, 1986
- A. Braverman, "Consumer Search and Alternative Market Equilibria", Review of Economic Studies, Vol. 47, pp. 487–502, 1980
- A. Braverman and T.N. Srinivasan, "Credit and Sharecropping in Agrarian Societies", Journal of Development Economics, Vol. 9, pp. 289–312, 1981
- K. Brooks, J.L. Guasch, A. Braverman and C. Csaki, "The Transition to Post-Collectivist Agriculture in Eastern Europe and the USSR: Dilemmas and Strategies", Journal of Economic Perspectives, Vol. 5, No. 4, pp. 149–61, 1991
- A. Braverman, N. Hassid and S. Drori, "Solving the Water Problem of the Middle East", in G.H. Peters (ed.) Agricultural Competitiveness: Market Forces And Policy Choice, pp. 496–508, Dartmouth University Press 1995
