= Minister in the Prime Minister's Office =

Member of the Cabinet of Israel

- שר במשרד ראש הממשלה

Agency overview
- Formed: 1951
- Jurisdiction: Government of Israel
- Minister responsible: Galit Distel-Atbaryan

A Minister in the Prime Minister's Office (Hebrew: שר במשרד ראש הממשלה, Sar BeMisrad Rosh HaMemshala) is a ministerial position in the Government of Israel. The position has been held by various ministers in successive Israeli governments, and ministers serving in the Prime Minister's Office have been assigned responsibility for particular areas of government activity.

== Current and former posts ==
- Religious Services (after the ministry was closed in 2003, authorities were transferred to the "National Authority for Religious Services". However, it was re-established in 2008, with a minister appointed)
- Strategic Affairs (today the Strategic Affairs Ministry)
- Regional Development (in the past it was the Development of the Negev and Galilee Ministry)
- Arab Sector affairs
- Intelligence Community (today the Intelligence Services Ministry)
- Jerusalem Affairs (until 1992 authorities were under Jerusalem Affairs Ministry)
- Israel Broadcasting Authority (closed in 2017)
- Improvement of Government Services (Authorities were delegated to Minister and Cabinet Member Michael Eitan, a Minister without portfolio)

All the ministrations aforementioned, which are under the Prime Minister Office responsibilities, are delegated to Ministers without portfolio, who are not part of the Prime Minister's office.

== See also ==
- Office of the Prime Minister (Israel)
