= 2005 Likud leadership election =

Israeli political party leadership election

- 19 December 2005
- Turnout: 44.46%
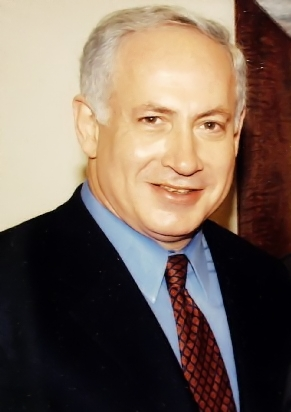

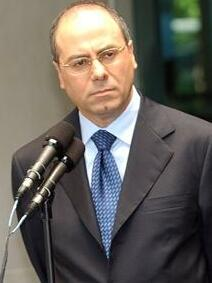

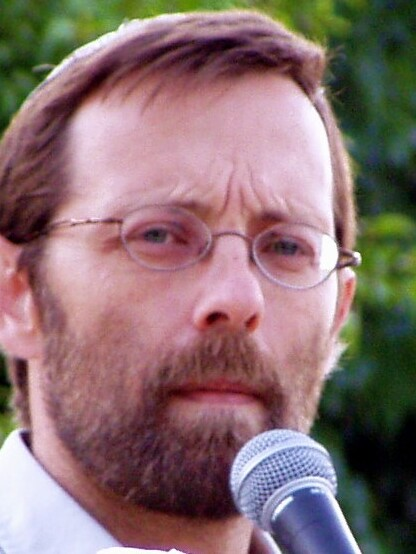

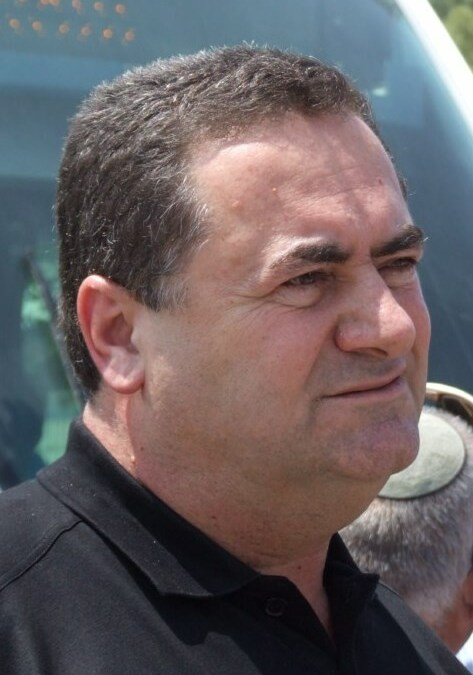
Candidate	Benjamin Netanyahu	Silvan Shalom
Party	Likud	Likud
Percentage	44.4%	33%
Candidate	Moshe Feiglin	Israel Katz
Party	Likud	Likud
Percentage	12.4%	8.7%
Likud leader before election
Dan Naveh (leading a council of ministers)
(Previously Ariel Sharon, then Tzachi Hanegbi as acting leader)
Likud leader after election
Benjamin Netanyahu

A leadership election was held by Likud on 19 December 2005. Former Prime Minister and party leader Benjamin Netanyahu defeated Deputy Prime Minister and Minister of Foreign Affairs Silvan Shalom, as well as candidates Moshe Feiglin and Israel Katz.

Likud's previous leader, Prime Minister Ariel Sharon, initially sought re-election as party leader, and was challenged by Netanyahu and Uzi Landau over Sharon's planned disengagement from the Gaza Strip. In November 2005, Sharon left Likud to form Kadima, after which Silvan Shalom, Moshe Feiglin, Israel Katz, and Defense Minister Shaul Mofaz announced their own bids for the leadership. Mofaz and Landau withdrew from the race in December, with Landau endorsing Netanyahu and Mofaz leaving Likud and joining Kadima.

Several months after Netanyahu's victory, Likud lost decisively in the 2006 Knesset election. The party later returned to power in 2009.

== Background ==
The previous leader of Likud was Ariel Sharon, then the Prime Minister of Israel. Sharon was first elected to lead Likud in September 1999, following Benjamin Netanyahu's resignation, and was elected Prime Minister in 2001. Sharon was subsequently re-elected as leader in 2002, defeating Netanyahu, and won the legislative election held the following year. Netanyahu served in Sharon's government, first as Minister of Foreign Affairs (2002–2003), and then as Minister of Finance from March 2003.

That year, Sharon made plans for a unilateral disengagement from the Gaza Strip, which faced significant opposition within Likud. In a party referendum held in May 2004, the plan was voted down 59.5–39.7%. Sharon subsequently brought the plan to a vote in the Knesset in October, where several members of Likud, including Netanyahu, conditioned the implementation of the plan on a national referendum. They subsequently backed down, allowing for the plan's approval. After the cabinet voted to begin the disengagement process in August 2005, Netanyahu resigned as Minister of Finance. Later that month, Netanyahu and Member of the Knesset Uzi Landau announced their intention to run for the party's leadership.

=== Motion for early election ===
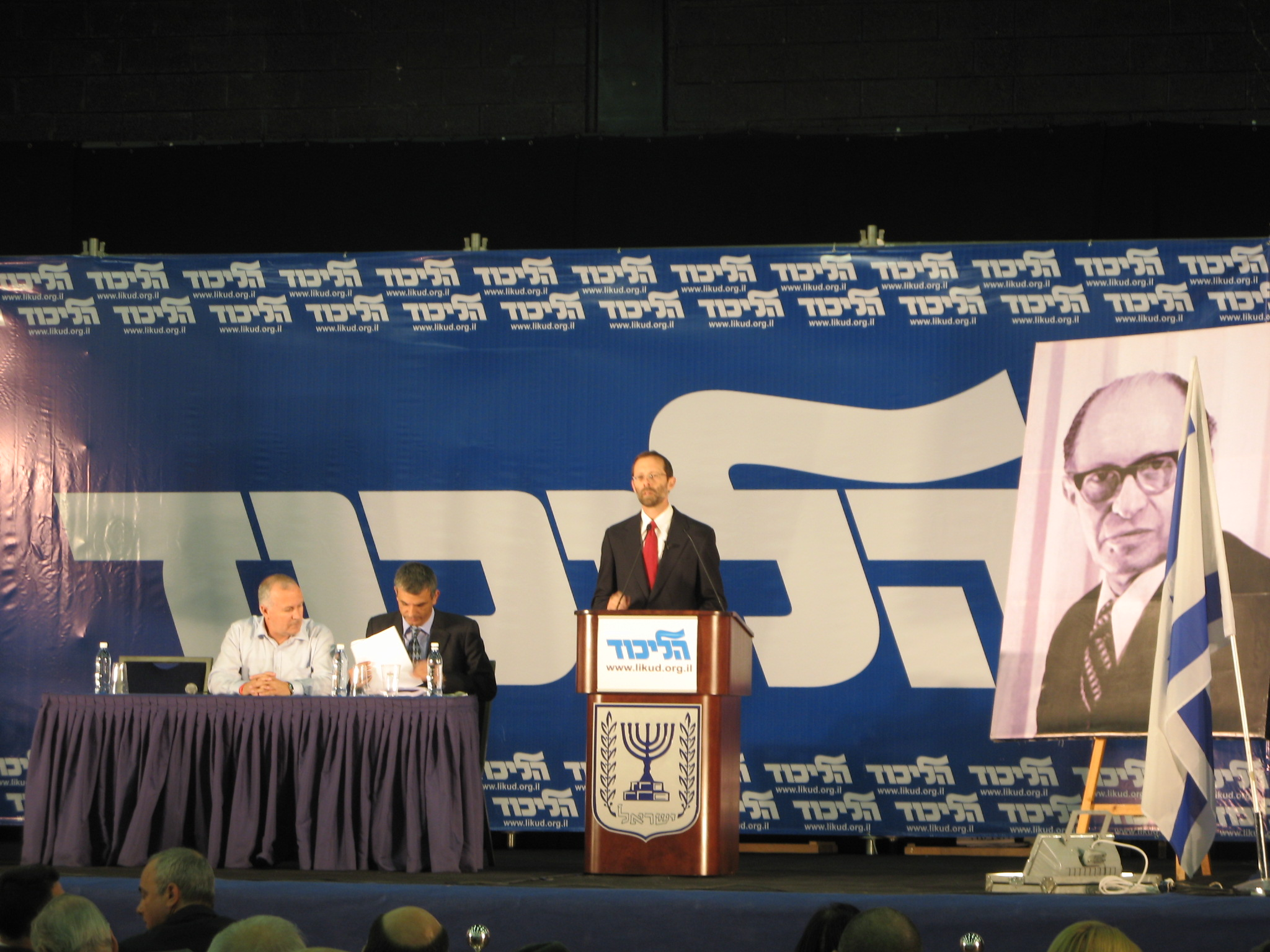
Likud's central committee (pictured in 2008) narrowly voted against Uzi Landau's proposal for an early leadership election

In July 2005, Landau proposed that Likud hold an early leadership election and began collecting signatures from members of the Central Committee to force a vote on the matter. (Note: Signatures from 20% of Likud's central committee were required to trigger a vote) The petition reached the required number of signatures in August, but was challenged due to alleged forgeries. On 30 August 2005, Likud's internal court ruled that the party's Central Committee must convene to debate the motion on 25 September and vote on it the following day.

Netanyahu supported Landau's motion for an early leadership election. The two candidates stated in a joint letter that the move was intended to prevent a lengthy struggle for the party's leadership. They also stated their belief that Sharon intended to leave Likud and form his own party, arguing that an early leadership election would prevent him from defecting close to the date of the next election. Several Likud politicians, including ministers Limor Livnat and Silvan Shalom and central committee chairman Tzachi Hanegbi, attempted to broker a compromise in which Netanyahu, Landau, and Sharon would agree on an election date, and Sharon would publicly commit to remain in Likud. Ultimately, the motion was voted down by the central committee in a 52–48% margin.

=== Formation of Kadima ===
In November 2005, Sharon resigned from both the leadership of Likud and the office of Prime Minister and founded a new party, Kadima. He was joined by members of Likud and the Israeli Labor Party, including Shimon Peres, who was ousted as leader of the Labor Party several weeks prior. Following Sharon's resignation, Central Committee Chairman Tzachi Hanegbi became the party's interim leader, and President Moshe Katsav, at the behest of Sharon and Labor leader Amir Peretz, scheduled a new election for March 2006. On 24 November, Likud's Central Committee announced the first round of the leadership election would be held on 19 December, with a potential second round scheduled for 26 December. Netanyahu formally announced his intention to run that same day, Silvan Shalom joined the race on 29 November, and Moshe Feiglin did so on 30 November. Israel Katz and Shaul Mofaz also announced their intention to run.

Hanegbi left Likud and joined Kadima on 7 December, and was provisionally replaced by a council of five Likud ministers led by Minister of Health Dan Naveh, and additionally including Education Minister Limor Livnat, as well as Members of the Knesset Gideon Sa'ar and Michael Eitan and Likud Director General Arik Brami.

== Campaign ==
Netanyahu campaigned on his financial and security policies, emphasizing his tenure as the Minister of Finance, and his opposition to Sharon's disengagement plan, criticizing the new Kadima party and referring to them as "Labor B". Following Landau's withdrawal from the race, Netanyahu stated that he would seek to recruit qualified candidates to the party's electoral list ahead of the general election. The day before the primary was held, he argued that he was the most electable candidate, and further criticized Sharon and Labor leader Amir Peretz for their financial policies and positions on the Israeli–Palestinian conflict. Netanyahu also stated his support for a pre-emptive strike against the Iranian nuclear program.

Shalom campaigned against Mofaz and Netanyahu, arguing that he was more electable. He additionally advocated for peace talks with the Palestinians, and criticized Netanyahu's cuts to social welfare programs as Finance Minister.

Feiglin's campaign attempted to appeal to secular voters. He ran on a platform he referred to as 'Family, Education, Security, and Justice'. aiming to preserve traditional family values, provide tax exemptions to married couples, include studies of Jewish history and identity in the national curriculum, withdraw from the Oslo Accords, and impose Israeli sovereignty on the West Bank. He additionally proposed that Likud form an electoral list with smaller right-wing parties.

Katz argued he represented the Mainstream of Likud, and criticized Netanyahu's cuts to social welfare programs as Finance Minister. He was accused by supporters of Ariel Sharon of replacing Sharon-appointed Likud officials with his own appointees to further his campaign for leadership.

Landau campaigned on his opposition to the disengagement plan, and like Feiglin, proposed the formation of an electoral list between Likud and smaller right-wing parties, before withdrawing from the race on 5 December and endorsing Netanyahu.

Mofaz, who announced his intention to run on November 21, campaigned on socio-economic issues, criticizing Netanyahu's economic policies and referring to him as "a Cream Child from Rehavia who hurt the poor". He ran on a pledge to narrow the wealth gap, expand Israeli settlements in the West Bank while negotiating with the Palestinian Authority, and to reform education. He additionally pledged to keep Likud in Sharon's government until after the 2006 election. Mofaz later withdrew from the race, left Likud, and joined Kadima on 11 December.

== Candidates ==
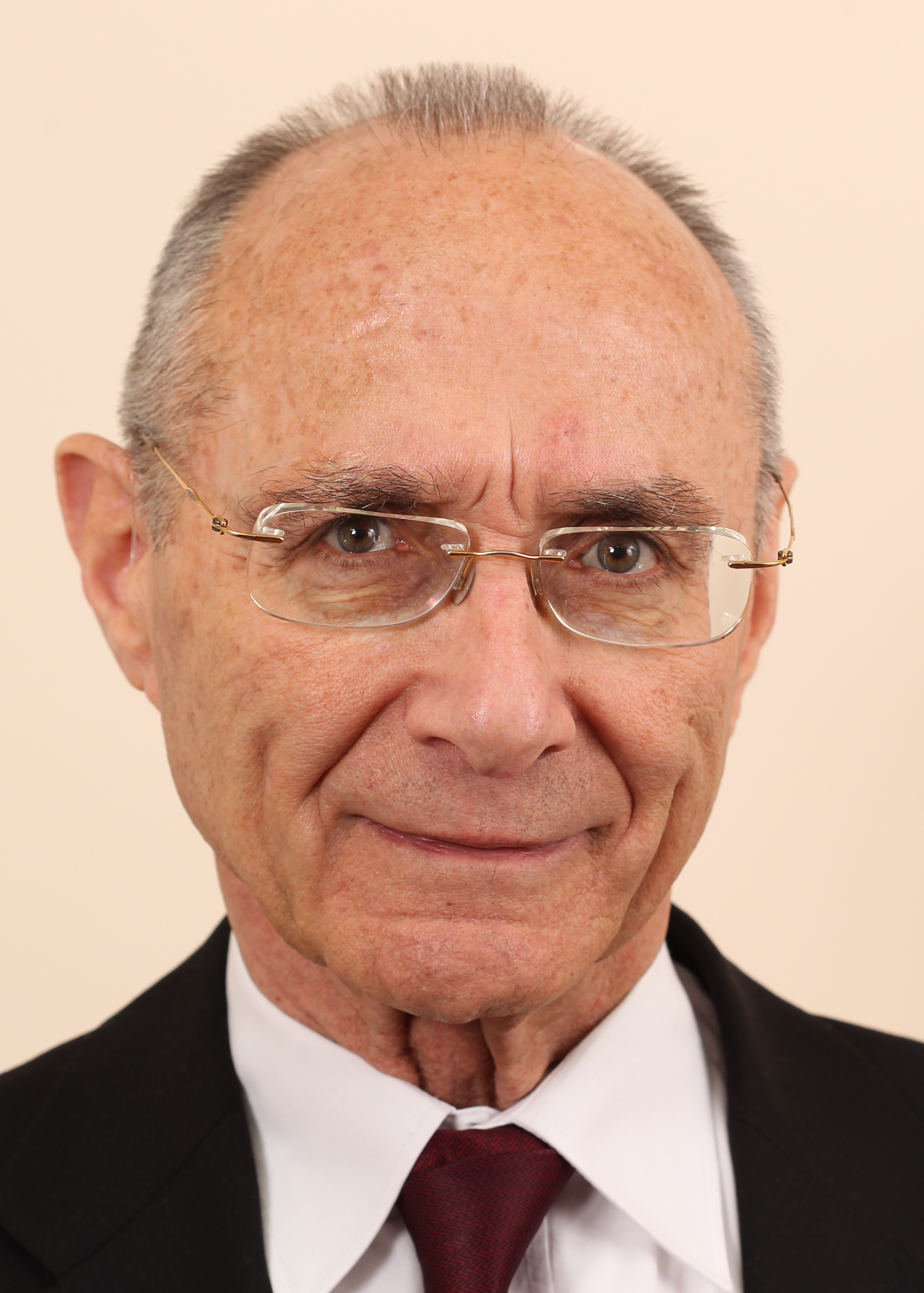
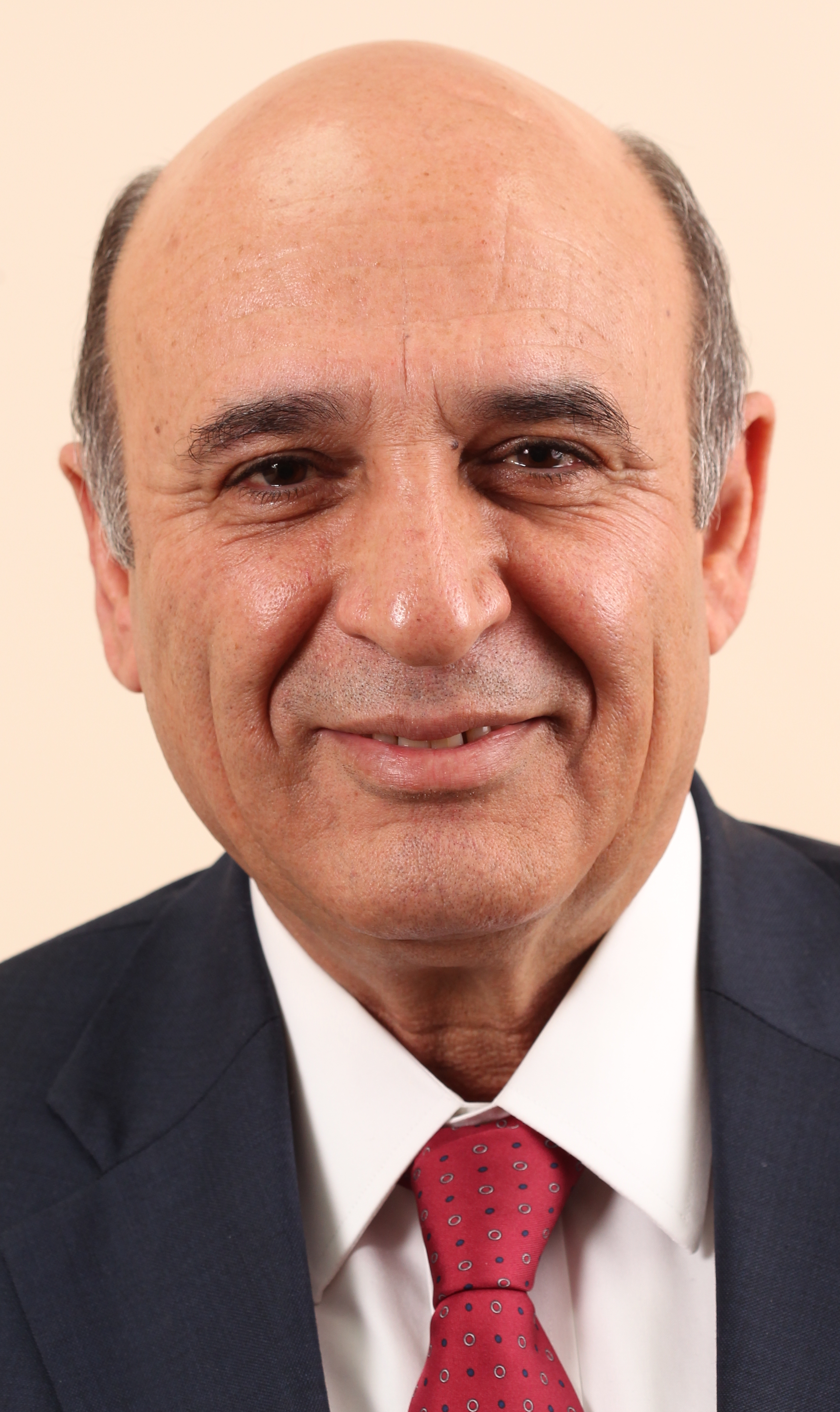
Two candidates, Uzi Landau and Shaul Mofaz, withdrew before the election
- Benjamin Netanyahu, Member of the Knesset, former Prime Minister of Israel, Leader of Likud and Minister of Finance (Note: This section only includes positions held before November 2005)
- Silvan Shalom, Member of the Knesset, Minister of Foreign Affairs and Deputy Prime Minister, former Minister of Finance
- Moshe Feiglin, leader of Manhigut Yehudit
- Israel Katz, Member of the Knesset and Minister of Agriculture and Rural Development

=== Withdrawn ===
- Ariel Sharon, incumbent leader and Prime Minister
- Uzi Landau, Member of the Knesset and former Minister of Public Security (endorsed Netanyahu)
- Shaul Mofaz, Member of the Knesset and Minister of Defense

== Polls ==
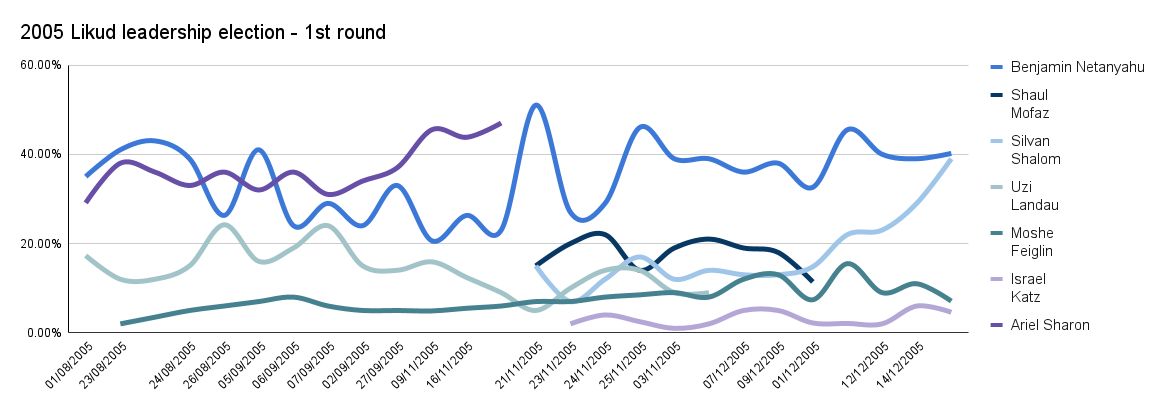
Graph of first-round polls

The following are polls of Likud Members conducted between August and December 2005:

=== First round ===
==== Before August 2005 ====
Date	Poll source	Ariel Sharon	Benjamin Netanyahu	Shaul Mofaz	Ehud Olmert	Silvan Shalom	Meir Sheetrit	Limor Livnat	Other/Undecided
7 August 2003	Shvakim Panorama (for Kol Yisrael)	48.6%	23.1%	11.4%	1.3%	1.6%	–	–	14%
7 August 2003	Shvakim Panorama (for Kol Yisrael)	–	48.3%	22.9%	2.9%	4.7%	–	–	21.2%
8 August 2003	New Wave Research (for Maariv)	–	38%	22%	7%	3%	4%	2%	–
10 October 2003	New Wave Research (for Maariv)	–	35%	20%	7%	3%	–	4%	–
12 December 2003	Dahaf (for Yedioth Ahronoth)	–	37%	31%	11%	7%	–	–	12%
9 January 2004	New Wave Research (for Maariv)	–	41%	18%	9%	6%	–	8%	–
16 January 2004	Dahaf (for Yedioth Ahronoth)	–	43%	21%	9%	7%	–	4%	14%
4 March 2004	Dahaf (for Yedioth Ahronoth)	–	37%	41%	8%	7%	–	–	3%
27 August 2004	Teleseker (for Maariv)	41%	24%	12%	2%	2%	–	–	–

==== August–November 2005 ====
Date	Poll source	Ariel Sharon	Benjamin Netanyahu	Uzi Landau	Moshe Feiglin	Other/Undecided
8 August 2005	Dialog (for Haaretz)	29.1%	35%	17.3%	–	–
10 August 2005	Maagar Mochot (for Kol Yisrael)	38%	41%	12%	2%	7%
18–23 August 2005	Maagar Mochot (for Channel 2)	36%	43%	12%	–	9%
24 August 2005	Maagar Mochot (for Kol Yisrael)	33%	39%	15%	5%	8%
23–24 August 2005	Dialog (for Haaretz)	30.6%	26.3%	24.2%	–	8.7%
25–26 August 2005	Maagar Mochot (for Channel 2)	32%	41%	16%	–	11%
4–5 September 2005	Dialog (for Haaretz)	36%	24%	19%	8%	–
6 September 2005	Dahaf (for Yedioth Ahronoth)	31%	29%	24%	–	–
7 September 2005	Maagar Mochot (for Kol Yisrael)	34%	24%	15%	5%	22%
20 September 2005	Maagar Mochot (for Channel 2)	37%	33%	14%	–	16%
27 September 2005	Dialog (for Haaretz)	45.5%	20.6%	15.9%	4.9%	–
9 November 2005	Maagar Mochot (for Kol Yisrael)	43.8%	26.3%	12.4%	–	15.7%
16 November 2005	Dialog (for Haaretz)	47%	23%	9%	6%	–

==== November–December 2005 ====
Date	Poll source	Benjamin Netanyahu	Shaul Mofaz	Silvan Shalom	Uzi Landau	Moshe Feiglin	Israel Katz	Other/Undecided
21 November 2005	Dahaf (for Yedioth Ahronoth)	51%	15%	15%	5%	–	–	–
21 November 2005	Maagar Mochot (for Makor Rishon)	27%	20%	7%	10%	–	2%	34%
23 November 2005	Maagar Mochot (for Kol Yisrael)	29%	22%	12%	14%	8%	4%	11%
24 November 2005	Teleseker (for Maariv)	46%	14%	17%	14%	–	–	–
25 November 2005 (Note: Date of publication)	Dahaf (for Yedioth Ahronoth)	39%	19%	12%	9%	9%	1%	–
30 November 2005	Dahaf (for Yedioth Ahronoth)	39%	21%	14%	9%	8%	2%	7%
7 December 2005	Maagar Mochot (for Kol Yisrael)	36%	19%	13%	–	12%	5%	15%
7 December 2005	Maagar Mochot (for Makor Rishon)	38%	18%	13%	–	13%	5%	–
9 December 2005	Teleseker (for Maariv)	32.6%	11.4%	14.8%	–	7.4%	2.2%	–

==== December 2005 ====
Date	Poll source	Benjamin Netanyahu	Silvan Shalom	Moshe Feiglin	Israel Katz	Other/Undecided
10 December 2005	Maariv	45.5%	22%	15.5%	–	–
12 December 2005	Dialog (for Haaretz and Channel 10)	40%	23%	9%	2%	–
12 December 2005	Dahaf (for Yedioth Ahronoth)	39%	29%	11%	6%	–
14 December 2005	Panorama Markets (for Kol Yisrael)	40.2%	39%	7.1%	4.6%	9.1%

=== Second round ===
==== Before August 2005 ====
Date	Poll source	Ariel Sharon	Benjamin Netanyahu	Shaul Mofaz	Ehud Olmert	Other/Undecided
8 August 2003	New Wave (for Maariv)	–	39%	43%	–	–
8 August 2003	New Wave (for Maariv)	–	56%	–	21%	–
10 October 2003	New Wave Research (for Maariv)	–	41%	42%	–	–
9 January 2004	New Wave Research (for Maariv)	–	52%	38%	–	–
9 January 2004	New Wave Research (for Maariv)	–	56%	–	26%	–
27 August 2004	Teleseker (for Maariv)	57%	29%	–	–	–

==== August–November 2005 ====
Date	Poll source	Ariel Sharon	Benjamin Netanyahu	Uzi Landau	Moshe Feiglin	Other/Undecided
8 August 2005	Dialog (for Haaretz)	33.2%	47.2%	–	–	–
9 August 2005	New Wave Research (for Channel 10)	27%	42%	–	–	–
10 August 2005	Maagar Mochot (for Kol Yisrael)	39%	49%	–	–	12%
11 August 2005	Globes-Smith	42%	30%	–	–	–
7–12 August 2005	Dahaf (for Yedioth Ahronoth)	38%	53%	–	–	–
22 August 2005	New Wave Research (for Channel 10)	36%	28%	–	–	–
23–24 August 2005	Dialog (for Haaretz)	30.5%	46.9%	–	–	13.6%
23–24 August 2005	Dialog (for Haaretz)	37%	–	45%	–	11.6%
24 August 2005	Maagar Mochot (for Kol Yisrael)	32%	44%	–	–	24%
30 August 2005	Maagar Mochot (for Channel 2)	34%	45%	–	–	21%
31 August 2005	Shvakim Panorama (for Kol Yisrael)	52.6%	33.4%	–	–	14%
4–5 September 2005	Dialog (for Haaretz)	38%	44%	–	–	–
6 September 2005	Dahaf (for Yedioth Ahronoth)	38%	47%	–	–	–
6 September 2005	Dahaf (for Yedioth Ahronoth)	–	41%	39%	–	–
7 September 2005	Maagar Mochot (for Kol Yisrael)	32%	38%	–	–	30%
27 September 2005	Dialog (for Haaretz)	47.6%	33.8%	–	–	–
27 September 2005	Dialog (for Haaretz)	–	29.1%	37.2%	–	33.5%
9 November 2005	Maagar Mochot (for Kol Yisrael)	48.7%	32.5%	–	–	18.8%
16 November 2005	Dialog (for Haaretz)	51%	32%	–	–	–

==== November–December 2005 ====
Date	Poll source	Benjamin Netanyahu	Shaul Mofaz	Silvan Shalom	Uzi Landau	Moshe Feiglin	Israel Katz	Other/Undecided
23 November 2005	Maagar Mochot (for Kol Yisrael)	41%	–	23%	–	–	–	36%
23 November 2005	Maagar Mochot (for Kol Yisrael)	42%	33%	–	–	–	–	25%
23 November 2005	Maagar Mochot (for Kol Yisrael)	40%	–	–	27%	–	–	33%
25 November 2005	Dahaf (for Yedioth Ahronoth)	52%	36%	–	–	–	–	–
25 November 2005	Dahaf (for Yedioth Ahronoth)	53%	–	–	34%	–	–	–
25 November 2005	Dahaf (for Yedioth Ahronoth)	58%	–	31%	–	–	–	–
30 November 2005	Dahaf (for Yedioth Ahronoth)	55%	39%	–	–	–	–	–
30 November 2005	Dahaf (for Yedioth Ahronoth)	56%	–	37%	–	–	–	–
7 December 2005	Maagar Mochot (for Kol Yisrael)	48%	31%	–	–	–	–	21%
7 December 2005	Maagar Mochot (for Kol Yisrael)	48%	–	38%	–	–	–	14%
7 December 2005	Maagar Mochot (for Kol Yisrael)	–	28%	39%	–	–	–	33%
9 December 2005	Teleseker (for Maariv)	43.4%	–	30.2%	–	–	–	–
9 December 2005	Teleseker (for Maariv)	43.4%	31%	–	–	–	–	–

==== December 2005 ====
Date	Poll source	Benjamin Netanyahu	Silvan Shalom	Moshe Feiglin	Israel Katz	Other/Undecided
10 December 2005	Maariv	57.4%	30%	–	–	–
12 December 2005	Dialog (for Haaretz and Channel 10)	46%	29%	–	–	–
14 December 2005	Panorama Markets (for Kol Yisrael) (Note: Among Likud members who were 'certain they will vote')	56.3%	38.4%	–	–	5.3%

== Results ==
2005 Likud leadership election (Note: This is a partial count and includes 98% of all votes cast in the election.)
Party	Candidate	Votes	%
Likud	Benjamin Netanyahu		44.4%
Likud	Silvan Shalom		33%
Likud	Moshe Feiglin		12.4%
Likud	Israel Katz		8.7%
Turnout			44.6%
Registered electors		128,347	

== Aftermath ==
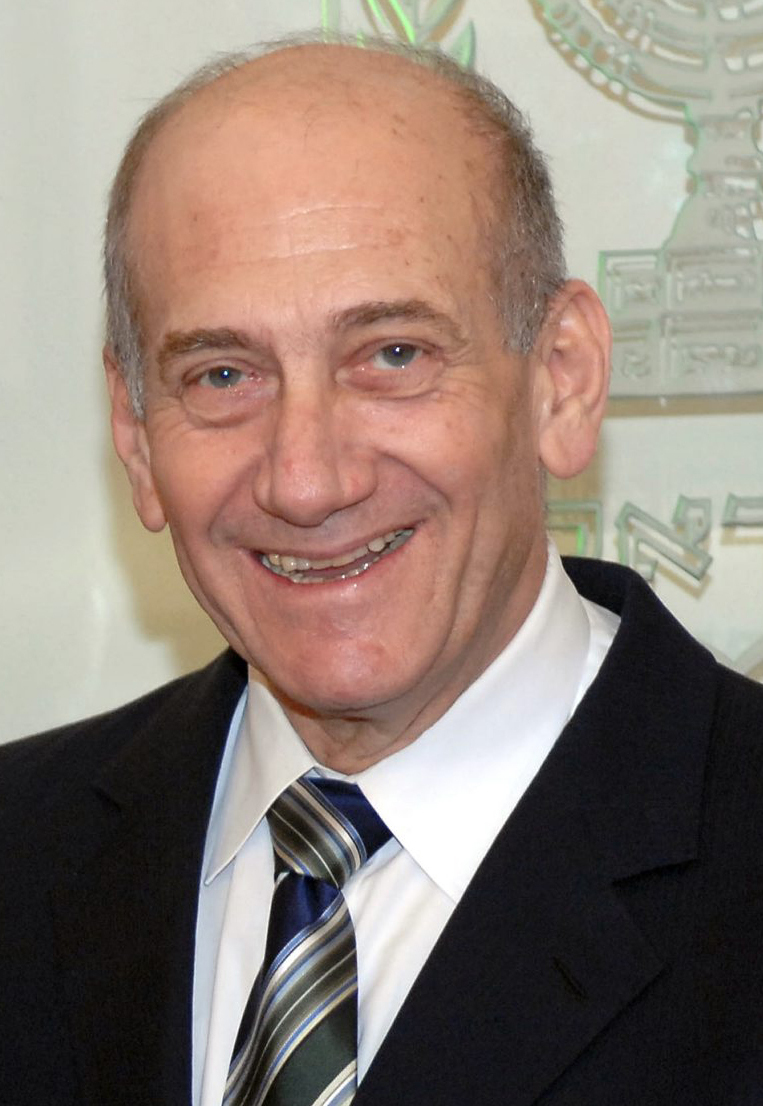
Netanyahu won the leadership election, but lost the ensuing legislative election to Kadima under Ehud Olmert (pictured)

Silvan Shalom conceded the election after initial results showed a Netanyahu victory. Feiglin expressed satisfaction with the results, arguing they indicated significant growth in his support within Likud. Following the primary, all remaining Likud Ministers resigned from the government by the end of January 2006. On 4 January, Ariel Sharon suffered a stroke that left him in a permanent coma until his death in 2014. He was replaced as prime minister by Ehud Olmert, who led the party through the general election in March.

Shalom intended to challenge Netanyahu a second time in 2007, but withdrew when the election date was moved forward. He retired from politics in 2015 following allegations of sexual misconduct. Feiglin challenged Netanyahu again in 2007 and 2012, winning 23% of the vote in both races. He later served as a member of the Knesset for Likud between 2013 and 2015, when he left the party to form Zehut.

Katz remained in Likud, serving in different ministerial roles, including as Minister of Transport (2009–2019), Foreign Affairs (2019–2020, 2024), and Finance (2020–2021). As of 2025, he serves as the Minister of Defense.

Landau lost his Knesset seat in the 2006 election. He then left the party and served as a member of the Knesset for Yisrael Beiteinu from 2009 until his retirement in 2015.

Following the 2006 election, Mofaz became a Deputy Prime Minister in the Olmert cabinet. He later served as leader of Kadima from 2012 until his retirement from politics in 2015.

Likud won 12 seats in the March election, less than a third of the 38 seats the party won in 2003. following the election, Olmert formed a new government, which did not include Likud. Netanyahu was re-elected as leader of Likud in 2007, and later won the 2009 legislative election, which resulted in him forming a government and becoming the prime minister for a second time. He served as prime minister from 2009 to 2021, and again since 2022. (Note: As of July 2025, Netanyahu remains Prime Minister of Israel)
