= Leadership election =

Election to choose a party leader

A leadership election is a political contest held in various countries by which the members of a political party determine who will be the leader of their party.

Generally, any political party can determine its own rules governing how and when a leadership election is to be held for that party. In the United Kingdom, for example:

Leadership elections are generally caused by the death or resignation of the incumbent (that is, the person already holding the post), although there are also formal and informal methods to remove a party's leader and thus trigger an election contest to find a replacement. There is, however, no common procedure whereby the main parties choose their leader.

A leadership election may be required at intervals set by party rules, or it may be held in response to a certain proportion of those eligible to vote expressing a lack of confidence in the current leadership. In the UK Conservative Party, for example, "a leadership election can be triggered by a vote of no confidence by Conservative MPs in their current leader".

Strictly speaking, a leadership election is a completely internal affair. An intra-party election held to select its candidates for external offices, such as a president, governor, prime minister or member of a legislature is called a primary election.

Leadership elections have great importance in parliamentary systems, where the chief executive (e.g.: a prime minister) derives their mandate from a parliamentary majority and the party's internal leaders hold frontbench positions within the parliament, if not outright serving in a ministerial post – whether as prime minister in the case of the leading government party, or another ministerial post for junior coalition partners. For that reason, most parliamentary systems do not hold dedicated prime ministerial primaries at all, but simply select their internal leader as their candidate for prime minister.

However, leadership elections are often similar to primary elections in that in the vast majority of instances, a party's leader will become prime minister (in a national election) or premier/minister-president/chief minister/first minister (in a province, state, territory, or other first-level administrative subdivision) should their party enter government with the most seats. Thus, a leadership election is also often considered to be one for the party's de facto candidate for prime minister or premier/minister-president/chief minister/first minister, just as a primary is one for a party's candidate for president.

An electoral alliance, which is composed of multiple parties each with its own separate leader and organs, may also hold a common Prime Ministerial primary as in the 2021 Hungarian opposition primary, or a single party may wish to retain its leader but select someone else as its Prime Ministerial candidate, as the Portuguese Socialist Party has done in 2014.

In presidential and semi-presidential systems, the chief executive (the President) can only be removed by an impeachment procedure, which can only be initiated in specific situations and by a special procedure (typically involving a legislative supermajority, an investigation by a constitutional court, or both), and removal entails either a snap election or automatic succession to office by a Vice president. As a result, leadership elections are largely background events, as the ruling party's policies are determined by the President, not by the party's internal leader. However, some systems allow one person to serve as both the President and the leader of the ruling party simultaneously, or even mandate it (such as the Democratic Progressive Party in Taiwan).

However, this is not entirely comparable to the parliamentary situation, as the majority and minority leaders of political parties in presidential systems are not the chief executive of their country (as a prime minister would be), but are rather officers of the legislative branch of their country, a position similar to the floor leader (which similarly is a post subservient to the prime minister) of a political party in a parliamentary system which likewise doesn't hold mass enfranchised elections for such a post.

In the Anglosphere, Political parties in Canada (Conservative, Liberal, New Democratic and the Green party) and in the United Kingdom (Labour, Conservative, Liberal Democrats and Green party) hold leadership elections where members of the party vote for the Leader.

In Australia, the Coalition parties and the federal Greens don't allow members to vote in leadership elections. Labor uses a split method with 50% weighting going to a vote of the party membership and 50% weighting going to the parliamentary caucus in the case of a contested election, most recently in 2013. As of 2026, the ACT Greens are the only notable party in Australia to have used a vote of solely the membership to elect a leader. In New Zealand, the National and Green party don't let members vote in leadership election, Labour last held a membership vote on the leadership in 2014.

== North America ==
=== Canada ===
- 2020 Conservative Party of Canada leadership election
- 2022 Conservative Party of Canada leadership election
- 2022 Green Party of Canada leadership election
- 2026 Green Party of Canada leadership election
- 2013 Liberal Party of Canada leadership election
- 2025 Liberal Party of Canada leadership election
- 2017 New Democratic Party leadership election
- 2026 New Democratic Party leadership election

=== Trinidad and Tobago ===
==== People's National Movement ====
- 2022 People's National Movement leadership election
- 2020 Tobago Council of the People's National Movement leadership election
- 2022 Tobago Council of the People's National Movement leadership election

==== United National Congress ====
- 2020 United National Congress leadership election
- 2022 United National Congress leadership election

== Europe ==
=== Austria ===
- 2023 Social Democratic Party of Austria leadership election

=== Croatia ===
==== Social Democratic Party of Croatia ====
- Elections in the Social Democratic Party of Croatia

=== Finland ===
- 2017 Finns Party leadership election
- 2021 Finns Party leadership election

=== Germany ===
- 2021 Christian Democratic Union of Germany leadership election
- 2019 Social Democratic Party of Germany leadership election

=== Greece ===
- 2015–16 New Democracy leadership election
- 2024 PASOK – KINAL leadership election

=== Ireland ===
==== Fine Gael ====
- 1987 Fine Gael leadership election
- 1990 Fine Gael leadership election
- 2001 Fine Gael leadership election
- 2002 Fine Gael leadership election
- 2017 Fine Gael leadership election
- 2024 Fine Gael leadership election

==== Labour Party ====
- 2014 Labour Party leadership election (Ireland)
- 2016 Labour Party leadership election (Ireland)
- 2020 Labour Party leadership election (Ireland)
- 2022 Labour Party leadership election (Ireland)

==== Fianna Fáil ====
- 1959 Fianna Fáil leadership election
- 1966 Fianna Fáil leadership election
- 1979 Fianna Fáil leadership election
- 1992 Fianna Fáil leadership election
- 1994 Fianna Fáil leadership election
- 2008 Fianna Fáil leadership election
- 2011 Fianna Fáil leadership election

=== Italy ===
- 2013 Lega Nord leadership election
- 2017 Five Star Movement leadership election
- 2017 Italian Left leadership election
- 2017 Lega Nord leadership election
- 2019 More Europe leadership election
- 2021 More Europe leadership election
- 2021 Five Star Movement leadership election

==== Democratic Party ====
- 2007 Democratic Party (Italy) leadership election
- 2009 Democratic Party (Italy) leadership election
- 2013 Democratic Party (Italy) leadership election
- 2017 Democratic Party (Italy) leadership election
- 2019 Democratic Party (Italy) leadership election
- 2023 Democratic Party (Italy) leadership election

=== Netherlands ===
- 2006 People's Party for Freedom and Democracy leadership election
- 2020 Christian Democratic Appeal leadership election
- 2006 Democrats 66 leadership election
- 2016 Labour Party (Netherlands) leadership election

=== Portugal ===
- 2020 Portuguese Social Democratic Party leadership election

=== Spain ===
- Spanish Socialist Workers' Party: (2017)
- People's Party: (2018)
- Podemos: (2020)

=== United Kingdom ===
==== Conservative Party ====
- 2005 Conservative Party leadership election
- 2016 Conservative Party leadership election
- 2019 Conservative Party leadership election
- July–September 2022 Conservative Party leadership election
- October 2022 Conservative Party leadership election
- 2024 Conservative Party leadership election

==== Labour Party ====
- 1922 Labour Party leadership election (UK)
- 1931 Labour Party leadership election
- 1932 Labour Party leadership election
- 1935 Labour Party leadership election
- 1955 Labour Party leadership election
- 1960 Labour Party leadership election
- 1961 Labour Party leadership election
- 1963 Labour Party leadership election (UK)
- 1976 Labour Party leadership election
- 1980 Labour Party leadership election (UK)
- 1983 Labour Party leadership election (UK)
- 1988 Labour Party leadership election (UK)
- 1992 Labour Party leadership election
- 1994 Labour Party leadership election
- 2007 Labour Party leadership election (UK)
- 2010 Labour Party leadership election (UK)
- 2015 Labour Party leadership election (UK)
- 2016 Labour Party leadership election (UK)
- 2020 Labour Party leadership election (UK)

==== Liberal Party/Social Democrats/Liberal Democrats ====
- 1967 Liberal Party leadership election
- 1976 Liberal Party leadership election
- 1982 Social Democratic Party leadership election
- 1988 Social and Liberal Democrats leadership election
- 1999 Liberal Democrats leadership election
- 2006 Liberal Democrats leadership election
- 2007 Liberal Democrats leadership election
- 2015 Liberal Democrats leadership election
- 2017 Liberal Democrats leadership election
- 2019 Liberal Democrats leadership election
- 2020 Liberal Democrats leadership election

==== Other parties ====
- 2019 British National Party leadership election
- June 2021 Democratic Unionist Party leadership election
- 2021 Green Party of England and Wales leadership election
- 2023 Scottish National Party leadership election
- 2015 Social Democratic and Labour Party leadership election
- 2021 UK Independence Party leadership election
- 2021 Ulster Unionist Party leadership election

== Africa ==
=== South Africa ===
==== African National Congress ====
- 54th National Conference of the African National Congress

==== Democratic Alliance ====
- 2020 Democratic Alliance Federal Congress

== Asia ==
=== Republic of China (Taiwan) ===
==== Democratic Progressive Party ====
- 2006 Democratic Progressive Party chairmanship election
- 2008 Democratic Progressive Party chairmanship election

==== Kuomintang ====
- 2001 Kuomintang chairmanship election
- 2005 Kuomintang chairmanship election
- 2007 Kuomintang chairmanship election
- 2009 Kuomintang chairmanship election
- 2013 Kuomintang chairmanship election
- 2015 Kuomintang chairmanship election
- 2016 Kuomintang chairmanship election
- 2017 Kuomintang chairmanship election
- 2020 Kuomintang chairmanship election
- 2021 Kuomintang chairmanship election

=== India ===
==== Indian National Congress ====
- 2022 Indian National Congress leadership election

=== Israel ===
==== Israeli Labor Party ====
- 1992 Israeli Labor Party leadership election
- 2001 Israeli Labor Party leadership election
- 2002 Israeli Labor Party leadership election
- 2005 Israeli Labor Party leadership election
- 2007 Israeli Labor Party leadership election
- 2011 Israeli Labor Party leadership election
- 2013 Israeli Labor Party leadership election
- 2017 Israeli Labor Party leadership election
- 2019 Israeli Labor Party leadership election
- 2021 Israeli Labor Party leadership election
- 2022 Israeli Labor Party leadership election

==== Kadima ====
- 2008 Kadima leadership election
- 2012 Kadima leadership election

==== Likud ====
- 2002 Likud leadership election
- 2005 Likud leadership election
- 2007 Likud leadership election
- 2012 Likud leadership election
- 2014 Likud leadership election
- 2019 Likud leadership election

== Oceania ==
=== Australia ===
==== ACT Greens ====
- 2026 ACT Greens leadership ballot

==== Australian Labor Party ====
- October 2013 Australian Labor Party leadership election

=== New Zealand ===
==== New Zealand Labour Party ====
- 2013 New Zealand Labour Party leadership election
- 2014 New Zealand Labour Party leadership election

== See also ==
- Primary elections, a similar concept used to select a party's candidates for external office instead of its internal leadership
- Leadership convention (Canada)
- Leadership spill (Australia)
