= Uzi Landau =

Israeli politician

- עוזי לנדאו
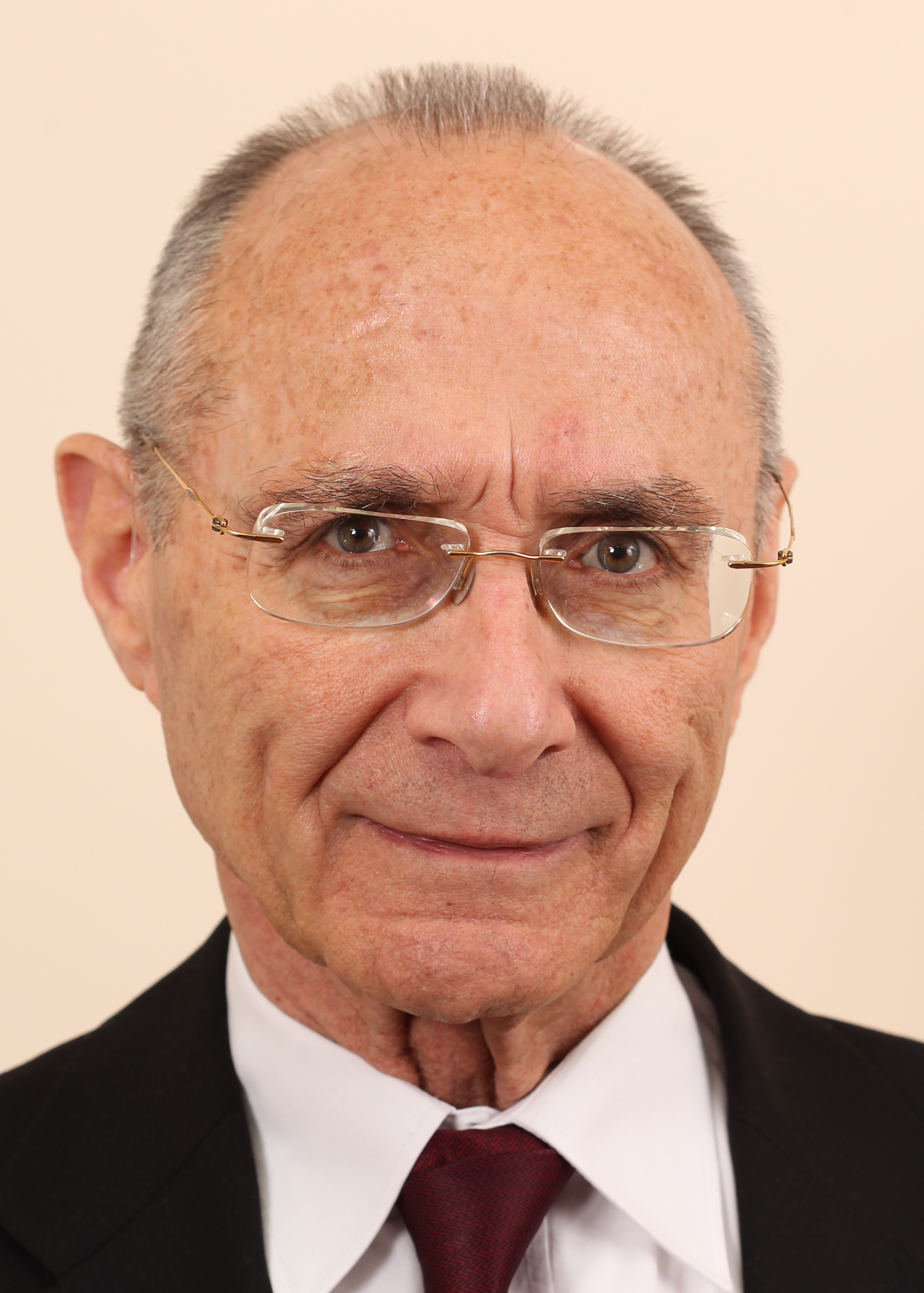

Ministerial roles
- 2001–2003: Minister of Public Security
- 2003–2004: Minister in the Prime Minister's Office
- 2009–2013: Minister of Energy and Water
- 2013–2015: Minister of Tourism

Faction represented in the Knesset
- 1984–2006: Likud
- 2009–2015: Yisrael Beiteinu

Personal details
- Born: 2 August 1943 (age 82) Haifa, Mandatory Palestine

Uzi Landau (Hebrew: עוזי לנדאו; born 2 August 1943) is an Israeli politician and systems analyst. He served as a member of the Knesset for Likud between 1984 and 2006, and for Yisrael Beiteinu between 2009 and 2015. He also held several ministerial posts, including Minister of Public Security, Minister in the Prime Minister's Office, Minister of Energy and Water Resources and Minister of Tourism.

== Biography ==
Landau was born in Haifa to Olga and Irgun fighter Haim Landau, who later served as a Knesset member and minister on behalf of the Herut Movement. He grew up in Ramat Gan and studied at the "Ohel Shem High School".

Upon his IDF enlistment, he volunteered for the Paratroopers Brigade and was assigned to the Nahal Airborne Battalion. In the Paratroopers, he completed training as a combat soldier, the Infantry Commanders Course, and the Infantry Officers Course. After the course, he returned to the brigade but was injured in a training accident and was discharged from the IDF. After several years, he returned to service and completed his compulsory service. During his reserve duty, Landau fought in the Six-Day War in Brigade 80, in the Battle of Umm-Katef, and in the Golan Heights. With the outbreak of the Yom Kippur War in October 1973, he returned from his studies in Boston for reserve duty in the Paratroopers Brigade, under the command of Danny Matt, which fought in the Egyptian front, and was the first to cross the Suez Canal as part of Operation Stouthearted Men. Even after being elected to the Knesset, he continued to serve in the reserves for many years, including in a combat intelligence unit, reaching the rank of Major.

Landau holds a Bachelor of Science (.BSc) and Master of Science (.MSc) in Industrial Engineering and Management from the Technion, and a PhD in engineering from the Massachusetts Institute of Technology (MIT) in the United States. He is a professional systems analyst.

He served as Director-General of the Ministry of Transport, a lecturer at the Technion, and a member of the boards of El Al, the Ports Authority, and the Israel Airports Authority. He was also a member of the management board of the Society for the Protection of Nature in Israel and a member of the management board of "Siah V'Sig" – the Israeli Discussion Culture Association.

In 1984, he was first elected to the Eleventh Knesset on the Likud list. Among other roles, he served as the Knesset's observer to the Council of Europe and as part of Israel's delegation to the Madrid Conference in 1991. He chaired the subcommittee on the defense budget (in the 12th Knesset), served as chairman of the Foreign Affairs and Defense Committee (in the 14th Knesset), and chaired the State Control Committee (in the 15th Knesset).

In 2001, Ariel Sharon appointed him as the Minister of Public Security. During his tenure, the police had to deal with severe terrorism attacks during the Second Intifada and a manpower shortage. In February 2003, he was appointed Minister without Portfolio in the Prime Minister's Office. In April, he was given responsibility for overseeing the intelligence services. That same year, when the Disengagement Plan was announced, he led the opposition to the plan within Likud, forming an alliance with other Likud MKs (the "Likud Rebels") to block its implementation, including voting against it in the Knesset. In response, Sharon dismissed him from the government on 26 October 2004.

In 2005, Landau announced his candidacy for the leadership of Likud, running alongside Benjamin Netanyahu, Shaul Mofaz, Silvan Shalom, Moshe Feiglin, and Yisrael Katz. Following the advice of Shmuel Hayek, Landau withdrew his candidacy and supported Netanyahu. In the 2006 elections for the 17th Knesset, Landau was placed 14th on the Likud list but did not win a seat as the party secured only 12 mandates. In February 2007, with the resignation of Danny Naveh from the Knesset, Landau was expected to take his place according to his ranking on the list but declined.

In 2006, he founded the Eretz Nehederet Association. He served as president of the Public Knowledge Institute starting in January 2008.

In November 2008, he announced his departure from Likud and his move to the Yisrael Beiteinu party. He was placed second on the party list by Avigdor Lieberman, was elected to the 18th Knesset, and on 31 March 2009, he was appointed Minister of National Infrastructure, a role that was later renamed Minister of Energy and Water. In this role, he opposed the implementation of the Sheshinski Committee's recommendations to raise taxes on the extraction of oil and natural gas in Israel.

In 2011, during a Knesset debate on laws aimed at changing the composition of the Supreme Court of Israel, Landau harshly criticized the court: "The composition of Supreme Court judges lacks pluralism; it is an Ashkenazi elite. It is leftist, political, disconnected from Judaism and sometimes from reality, and allows itself to intrude into areas beyond its jurisdiction."

Ahead of the 2013 elections for the 19th Knesset, he was placed seventh on the Likud– Yisrael Beiteinu list and in March 2013 was appointed Minister of Tourism. On 28 December 2014, ahead of the 2015 elections for the 20th Knesset, he announced his retirement from parliamentary activity.

He served as co-chairman of the Jewish National Fund until his resignation on 20 June 2016.

In July 2016, Defense Minister Avigdor Lieberman appointed him as chairman of Rafael Advanced Defense Systems, a position he held until April 2023.
