= Shmuel Sackett =

American-Israeli politician

Shmuel (Seth) Sackett (Hebrew: שמואל סקט; born 1961 in Middle Village, Queens) is an American-Israeli Religious Zionist leader. He co-founded both the Zo Artzeinu and Manhigut Yehudit ("Jewish Leadership") political movements in Israel.

During the 1990s, Zo Artzeinu opposed the Oslo Accords through civil disobedience. In 1998, Sackett co-founded Manhigut Yehudit with long-time partner Moshe Feiglin.

== Life and career ==
Sackett was born in the United States, and studied at Touro College in New York City. He was educated in both Talmudic scholarship and secular academic subjects. He had been involved in Jewish youth work, and in Jewish educational outreach to secular Jews, some of whom became baal teshuvas ("returnees to Judaism") under his tutelage. He worked in Wall Street's Financial District before making Aliyah to Israel and settling in the West Bank in 1990.

Sackett had been a member of the JDL in the 1970s, and a loyal follower of Kach leader Rabbi Meir Kahane in the United States. Sackett eventually followed Kahane to Israel, where he joined Kach and, later, Kahane Chai. He became the director of Kahane Chai. After Feiglin's election to the Knesset in 2013, Sackett authored an article on the Manhigut Yehudit website rejecting calls from supporters that he and Feiglin renounce Kahane. He co-founded Zo Artzeinu with Moshe Feiglin in 1993.

While Sackett was a close friend of Kahane's son, Rabbi Binyamin Ze'ev Kahane, he disagreed with the younger Kahane's tactics. Sackett and Feiglin shared some of Meir Kahane's goals, such as the relocation of Palestinians living in Israel to be relocated to places outside of Israel.

Sackett worked as Manhigut's International Director. When Feiglin left Likud and created Zehut, Sackett joined him and was chosen 12th on the party list for the April 2019 elections in which the party did not pass the electoral threshold. In the following September 2019 elections, he was placed on the 15th and final place in Zehut's candidate list. The party forwent the candidacy before the elections took place.
