= Moshe Feiglin =

Right-libertarian Israeli politician (born 1962)

- משה פייגלין
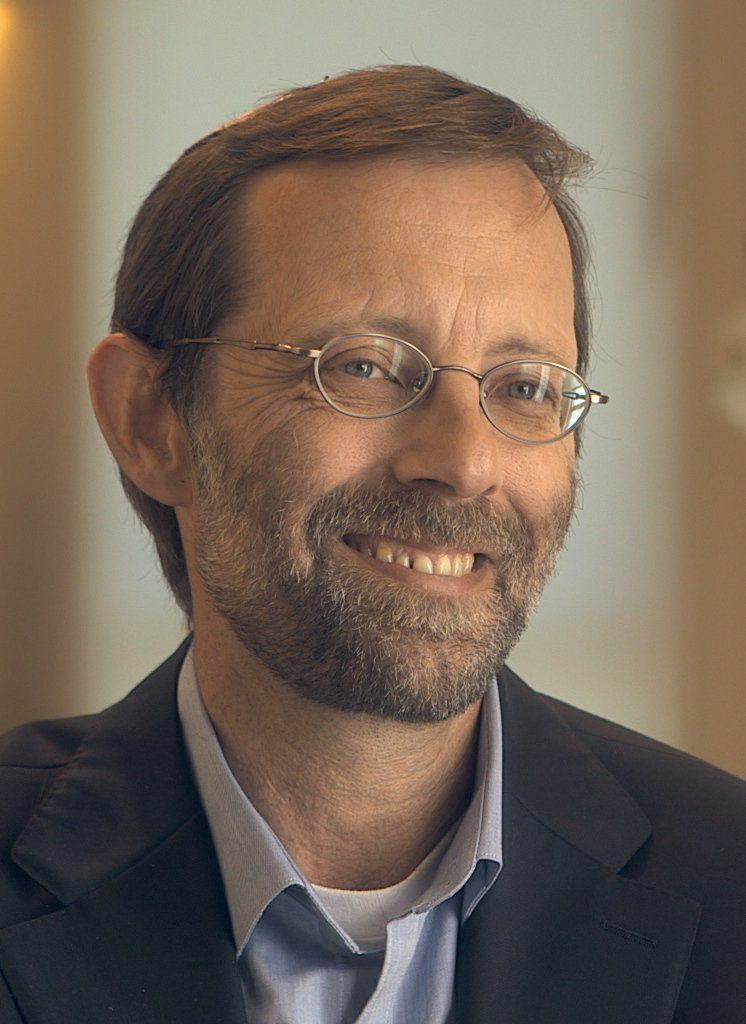
- Feiglin in 2014

Faction represented in the Knesset
- 2013–2015: Likud (Manhigut Yehudit)
- 2015: Zehut
- 2026-: Religious Zionism–Zehut

Personal details
- Born: 31 July 1962 (age 64) Haifa, Israel
- Party: Zehut (2015-2021); (2024-present)
- Other political affiliations: Likud (2000-2015); (2021-2024)
- Children: 5

Moshe Zalman Feiglin (Hebrew: מֹשֶׁה זַלְמָן פַייגְלִין; born 31 July 1962) is a right libertarian-leaning Israeli politician and activist who is currently serving as a member of the Knesset as the leader of Zehut, a libertarian political party. Formerly a member of Likud, he headed the Manhigut Yehudit (Jewish Leadership) faction within the party, and represented Likud in the Knesset between 2013 and 2015.

Prior to becoming a Knesset member, Feiglin co-founded the Zo Artzeinu ("This is our Land") movement with Shmuel Sackett in 1993 to protest the Oslo Accords. In 1995, the movement blocked eighty intersections in an act of civil disobedience, and Feiglin was sentenced to six months in prison in 1997 for sedition against the Israeli state. In 1996, Feiglin founded Manhigut Yehudit as a continuation of Zo Artzeinu. Manhigut Yehudit joined Likud in 2000. Feiglin ran for chairman of Likud in 2002, 2005, 2007 and 2012, losing the first election to Ariel Sharon and the rest to Benjamin Netanyahu.

Feiglin was elected to the Knesset in the 2013 election as a member of Likud after winning the 13th slot in the party's electoral list primary. He lost re-election in 2015 after being demoted to the 36th slot. After the primary, Feiglin announced his intention to leave Likud and form a new party, Zehut, which ran in the April 2019 election, winning 2.7% of the vote and failing to cross the electoral threshold. Zehut withdrew from the September 2019 election and Feiglin rejoined Likud in 2021. Feiglin again sought election to the Knesset in 2022 as a member of Likud, but won the 52nd slot on the party list and was not elected. In 2024, Feiglin left Likud and reformed Zehut which ran on a joint list with the Religious Zionist Party in the 2026 election, winning one seat.

== Biography ==
Moshe Feiglin was born in Haifa, the son of Ya'akov Zvi and Esther Feiglin. His ancestors moved to Palestine, from Imperial Russia during the First Aliyah. His grandfather was the first child born in Metula, and some of his ancestors were among the founders of several settlements, including Mishmar HaYarden, Hadera, and Kinneret. His father served in the Jewish Settlement Police during the British Mandate era. His family later moved to Rehovot, where he attended the local Tachkemoni school of the Mizrachi movement, and subsequently graduated from Rabbi Haim Drukman's Yeshivat Or Etzion. They are also related to Rebbes of The Chabad Dynasty.

During his IDF national service, Feiglin served in the Engineering Corps. He later signed on to one additional year as a career soldier, and attained the rank of captain. He fought in the 1982 Lebanon War.

Feiglin ran a company that used rope rappelling in the construction industry.

Feiglin is married, and has five children, and lives in the settlement of Karnei Shomron.

== Political career ==
=== Manhigut Yehudit ===
Prior to becoming a Knesset member, Feiglin co-founded the Zo Artzeinu ("This is our Land") movement with Shmuel Sackett in 1993 to protest the Oslo Accords. On 8 August 1995, eighty intersections throughout the country were blocked in a massive act of non-violent civil disobedience against the Oslo process. As a result of his activities, Feiglin was sentenced to six months in prison in 1997 for sedition against the state by Israel's Supreme Court. The sentence was later commuted to community service.

In November 1996, Feiglin established the Manhigut Yehudit movement. It began as a brainchild of Feiglin and a friend of his, Moti Karpel, who established the organization as the continuation of the Zo Artzeinu protest movement. The main tactical difference between the two in Feiglin's thought is that Zo Artzeinu protested government policy without suggesting an alternative, whereas Manhigut Yehudit seeks to become the government and be the alternative.

Lacking the tools to do this, and without a political party with which to stake his run, he was approached by a founding member of the Likud party and participant in the Zo Artzeinu protests who proposed that Feiglin register for the Likud party and register, in turn, the thousands who participated in the protests, thereby building a support base for himself in the party, from which he could run for the party presidency and, in turn, prime minister.

According to Feiglin's own words, Manhigut Yehudit was started to "return the country to the people and lead the State of Israel through authentic Jewish values".

Feiglin says that the movement's leadership will arise from "those who have a deep commitment to Torah values". Still, 30 percent of its present members are secular (2005). He opposes the surrender of what he regards as Jewish land, and has demanded the government take action against the estimated 50,000 illegal Arab structures built throughout the country. Feiglin has stated that Likud had "given up true Likud values and acquiesced in the Gaza evacuation".

=== Likud ===
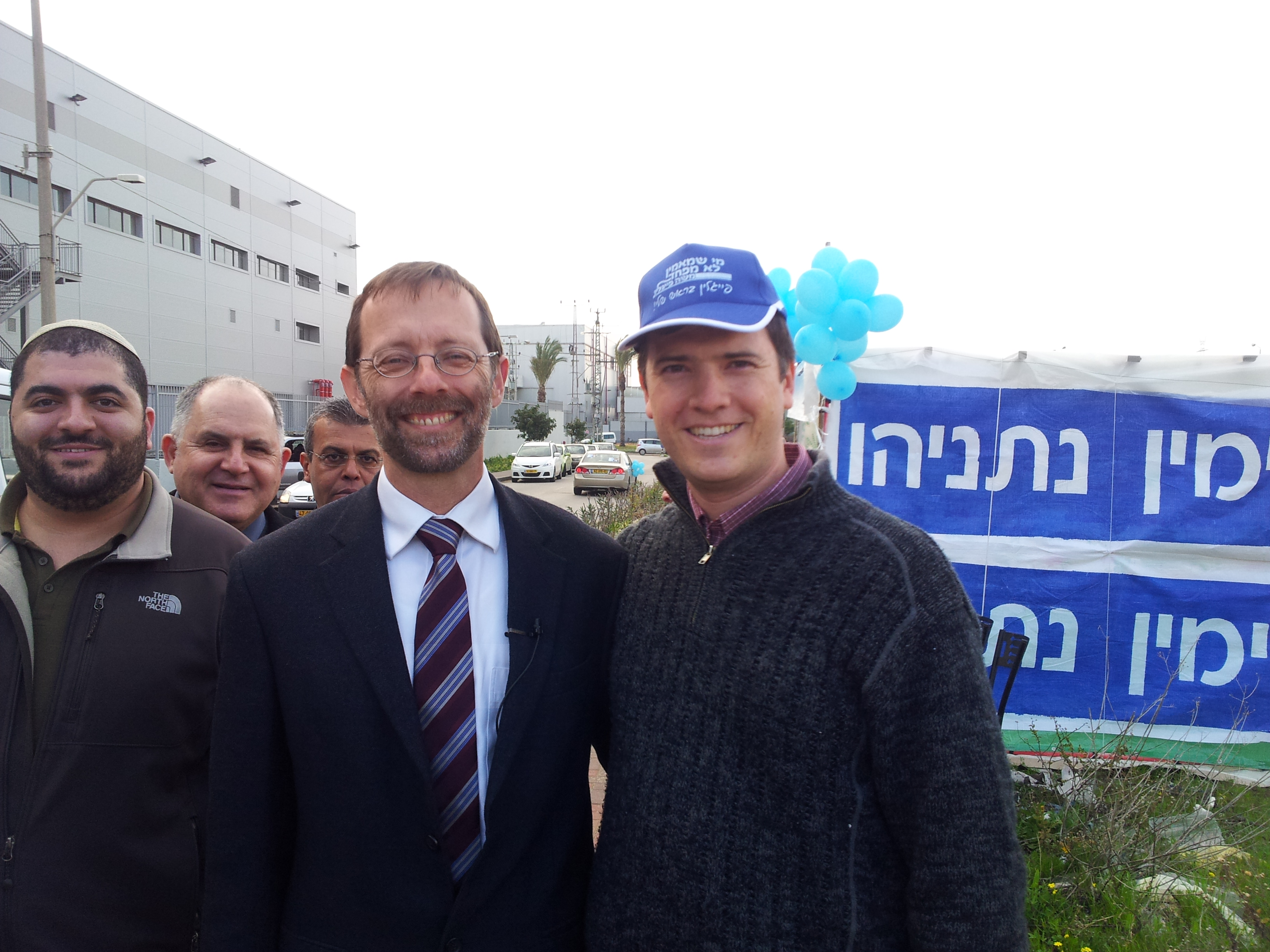
Moshe Feiglin campaigning with supporters for the Likud leadership primaries, 2012

Manhigut Yehudit joined Likud in 2000, with Feiglin declaring that he would be a candidate for chairmanship of the party as a springboard for premiership of the State of Israel. Feiglin was a minor candidate in the 2002 Likud leadership election.

In 2005, Feiglin again ran for Likud chairman and won 12.5% of the votes, coming third out of seven candidates, after Benjamin Netanyahu and Silvan Shalom. He attempted to run for a slot on the party's Knesset list, but encountered severe opposition from Netanyahu, who delayed party elections and advocated making changes to its charter to bar "anyone who has served three or more months in prison" from running as a Likud MK. This would have prevented Feiglin, who served a six-month sentence in the mid-1990s for civil disobedience, from running for either an MK or leadership position in the future. Feiglin withdrew from the race on 3 January 2006, following the release of a statement from the Likud party election chairman declaring, in agreement with a prior decision by the Israeli High Court, that Feiglin's conviction was not for "dishonorable" violations of the law, allowing him to participate in future Likud affairs.

In the 14 August 2007 primaries, Feiglin nearly doubled his previous showing and received 23.4% of the votes to Netanyahu's 72.8%. Netanyahu, fearing a strong showing by Feiglin, tried to have him ousted from the party prior to the vote, and said he would continue such efforts. On 10 December 2008, Feiglin was won twentieth place in the Likud primaries. On 11 December, following a petition submitted against him by Ofir Akunis, he was demoted to the 36th spot.

In an article written in 2009, Feiglin stated: "Sad to say, Prime Minister Netanyahu is a pitiful puppet of Peres and his cohorts."

Feiglin ran against Netanyahu again in the 2012 Likud leadership election, held on 31 January 2012, and again received 23% of the vote. In the Likud primaries held in late 2012 to select candidates for the 2013 elections, Feiglin finished thirteenth, and was elected to the Knesset in the 2013 elections.

Feiglin served as Deputy Speaker in the 19th Knesset. He and his Manhigut Yehudit faction suffered a serious setback in the December 2014 Likud primaries, held in the run-up to the 2015 Knesset elections, when he fell to the 36th position on the Likud list, making it unlikely he would be returned to the Knesset.

=== Zehut ===
In January 2015, he announced that he was leaving Likud to form his own party, after the Likud primaries the previous month. Feiglin complained about efforts that were done to try to keep him out of Israel's parliament, the Knesset. He referred to alleged political corruption in the Likud primary and legal maneuvers Benjamin Netanyahu took in the past to move him down the party’s list, accusing the prime minister of trying to assassinate him politically. As a result of said issues, as well as timing, Feiglin did not form a new party for the Knesset elections in March, and instead decided to take his time to build a strong new party ("If we have to give up on the coming Knesset to build ourselves well and fundamentally, we will do so. We will take the time that we need to build ourselves in the proper and most exacting way."). Shortly after the 2015 election, he announced that the new party was to be called Zehut (Identity). Feiglin's party is in favor of legalizing marijuana.

=== Likud ===
In July 2021, Feiglin returned to Likud. He sought election to the Knesset in 2022 as a member of Likud, but won the 52nd slot on the party list and was not elected.

=== Zehut ===
In January 2024, Feiglin left Likud and reestablished Zehut. The party announced it will contest the 2026 election, and on 1 September 2026, agreed on a joint run with the Religious Zionist Party, with Feiglin receiving the second slot on the joint list. Feiglin was elected to the Knesset.

== Views and opinions ==
Feiglin has openly stated that, though he is not opposed to peace, peace is not his goal, and would not be on the top of his agenda as prime minister. Rather, Feiglin's focus is on reforming Israel as an essentially Jewish state by acting on several campaigns on the religious, social, legal, and security fronts.

In a May 2012 article on liberty that originally appeared on the NRG Maariv Hebrew website, Feiglin wrote: "Liberty means fighting against coercion of all kinds; religious, anti-religious, economic, cultural, educational, and more. Liberty means allocating state land to the citizen. It means privatization of government firms to the public, and not to core shareholders. Liberty means liberalized communication - broadcasting license and not broadcast franchise. You want to open up a television or radio station? Buy a wavelength and broadcast as you please within the framework of the law. Liberty means restoring the responsibility for education to the parents, using the education coupon method. It means a gradual transfer to a professional volunteer army. Liberty means prohibiting biometric data bases or any other type of human designation. There is no difference in principle between sophisticated biological marking and tattooing an ID number; both turn our identities into the property of a third party. In both, we lose our freedom. Simply put: We have one G-d above us, and we should not be enslaved to another person or mechanism. The state is ours, and under no circumstance is the opposite true."

He is against religious coercion and the establishment of religious political parties, and has come out against legislation such as the Chametz Law, which forbids selling leavened products during Passover, as dictated by Jewish law. Feiglin has stated that he wants "every Jew not to eat chametz because of national honor, cultural pride. Not because of a law".

He is also a proponent of the civil marriage initiative in Israel which would allow any Israeli citizen to marry without a religious cleric. At present, marriage in Israel is impossible outside the confines of a religious system; hence, for tens of thousands of people with problematic religious status, it is impossible ever to get married in the country. The present system also places the power of divorce in the hand of the Religious courts, who are answerable only to the Supreme Courts. The civil marriage initiative would make the religious nature of marriage entirely voluntary, effectively separating religion and state in this matter.

Feiglin has advocated removing the Jerusalem Islamic Waqf's control over the entire al-Aqsa complex, and stated that a synagogue should be established on the Temple Mount. In February 2014, at Feiglin's insistence, the Knesset debated the status of the Temple Mount. Feiglin's platform states:"We have to internalize that this is our Land - exclusively... Most important: We must expel the Moslem wakf from the Temple Mount and restore exclusive Israeli sovereignty over this most holy site."

In July 2014, during the 2014 Israel–Gaza conflict, Feiglin outlined steps toward "achieving quiet in Gaza". His plan included attacking all of Gaza, its infrastructure and military sites, without regard to civilian "human shields". After conquering and annexing Gaza into Israel, that portion of Gaza's "enemy population that is innocent of wrong-doing and separated itself from the armed terrorists will be treated in accordance with international law and will be allowed to leave". After becoming part of Israel, Gaza would be re-populated by Jews. He said the civilians of Gaza could go to Sinai, and his plan would also "ease the housing crisis in Israel". Feiglin criticized lawmaker Aliza Lavie for discussing legislation on sexual violence, protesting that in wartime, no one should be "talking about things like flowers and sexual assault".

On 4 August 2014, the Daily Mail tabloid newspaper alleged that Feiglin had called for concentration camps in Gaza. In an with Wolf Blitzer on CNN's The Situation Room, Feiglin denied the claim, saying he was talking about creating "sheltered areas" for the civilians of Gaza to provide a more "humane" option, allowing Israel "to more effectively crush Hamas rocket-launchers." Feiglin said "I want to give the Arabs in the Gaza Strip three choices. Those who are fighting against us should be killed. Those who wish to leave [...] should get the support from us and the international community to find a better place. Those who want to stay can stay." Blitzer asked if he supported "tent encampments" for civilians from Gaza before they are "helped along to another destination," to which he responded "Definitely."

In 2008, Feiglin has proposed a plan to end the conflict between Israel and the Palestinians. His plan would include annexing all post-1967 land currently under Israeli occupation and offering financial incentive for Palestinian families in these areas to emigrate to other countries. Feiglin pointed to a poll by An-Najah University in Nablus, which showed that one in three Palestinian Arabs would emigrate to other countries even without a financial incentive, as supporting his plan.

About 20% of Israel's citizens are Israeli Arabs. Feiglin was asked about Israel's status as a "Jewish and democratic state" in a 2004 interview, and stated: "Why should non-Jews have a say in the policy of a Jewish state? ... For two thousand years, Jews dreamed of a Jewish state, not a democratic state. Democracy should serve the values of the state, not destroy them..."

In 2003, Feiglin proposed replacing the Knesset with a bicameral legislature, whose upper house, which would control all "national affairs", would be "composed exclusively of Jews". Point three in the program states that he will enact a new Basic Law which will set forth a detailed proposal for a constitution. The Law will replace the at-large election of the Knesset with regional representatives, and would also create a lower house to handle municipal issues, in which Israeli Arabs could be represented. The posting was taken down on 9 December 2008, the day after Feiglin won twentieth place in the Likud primaries. However, the posting had been archived by Israeli scholar Tomer Persico prior to being removed, and Persico wrote a 2012 article analyzing Feiglin's program, referencing the 2003 posting.

On 3 April 2019, Feiglin gave a speech at Maariv Jerusalem Post conference in Tel Aviv, in which he called to rebuild the Third Temple immediately. He said in a statement: "I don't want to build a Third Temple in one or two years, I want to build it now. To build the Temple, I need support; I can't do it alone."

After the October 7 attacks in 2023, Feiglin said in an interview with Al Jazeera that the only solution is the "complete destruction of Gaza, before invading it… Destruction like Dresden and Hiroshima, without a nuclear weapon." On 15 June 2024, Feiglin said, in the context of the Gaza war, "As Hitler said 'I can't live if one Jew is left,' we can't live here if one 'Islamo-Nazi' remains in Gaza."

On 22 May 2025 Feiglin told Israeli TV Channel 14, in the context of the Gaza war, "The enemy is not Hamas, nor is it the military wing of Hamas ... Every child, every baby in Gaza is the enemy. We need to occupy Gaza and settle it, and not a single Gazan child will be left there. There is no other victory."

In a 2026 interview with Itamar Fleishman on Galei Yisrael radio, Feiglin described Meir Kahane as a tzaddik who was correct "on most of the things he said". He also said, in reference to humanitarian aid to the Gaza strip, "The Zehut party would have left the government the moment the first grain of rice was transferred", and criticized Bezalel Smotrich and Itamar Ben-Gvir for not following through on their threats to do the same.

== Published works ==
In his 2005 book "War of Dreams", Feiglin wrote that his program was: "Israeli citizenship to Jews only [and] the immediate expulsion of any person of another people who claims any sort of sovereignty in the Land of Israel." "We are busy fighting for Yesha, and refuse to recognize the more dangerous front against the fifth column inside Israel." "We established a state so that we could stop being different and start being normal. If only Jews can be Israelis, then we will never be normal. . . .The fundamental solution is leadership that is not looking for normalcy. The solution is leadership that emphasizes our Jewish identity. Paradoxically, it is only when the Arabs understand that the Israelis do not need them to help them to forget that they are Jews - will we be able to live here in peace with non-Jews who unequivocally accept the fact that Israel is a Jewish state." It appears that the Israeli Arabs identify with our enemies. There are laws in this country that deal with treason and they should be applied when required. If Israeli Arabs are found helping our enemies, they should be stripped of their citizenship. In addition, if they are citizens, they should not be exempt from paying taxes; they should serve in the IDF, or at least in Sherut Le'umi, the National Service. . . . .If they are against us, we must make every effort to ensure that they leave. If they collaborate with our enemy, they must be removed.

== Controversy and criticism ==
=== Comments on Arabs ===
Of Israeli Arabs, Feiglin said, "They will have to seek the right to self-determination in Arab states. Israel will encourage the Arabs to emigrate to their countries and assist any Arab who wishes to do so." He insisted there is no such thing as a Palestinian people, and that they and Israeli Arabs should relocate, citing a text he had posted on the website of his Manhigut Yehudit ("Jewish Leadership") movement. In a 2004 interview with Yedioth Ahronoth, he spoke of "a voluntary transfer to the 22 neighbouring Arab states" of the some 1.4 million Israeli Arabs, who make up 20 percent of Israel's population. "Arabs are not the sons of the desert, but its fathers", he quoted Sir Claude Jarvis, British governor of Sinai from 1923.

In a 2004 report in The New Yorker, Feiglin was quoted as saying: "Why should non-Jews have a say in the policy of a Jewish state?... For two thousand years, Jews dreamed of a Jewish state, not a democratic state. Democracy should serve the values of the state, not destroy them... You can’t teach a monkey to speak and you can’t teach an Arab to be democratic. You’re dealing with a culture of thieves and robbers. The Arab destroys everything he touches."

In an interview with the U.S.-based The Jewish Press, Feiglin said: "You can find places where we say the same things. You can also find places where we are different. I was in the army when Meir, Hashem yikom damo [may God avenge his blood], was [most] active, so I didn't get to know him so well. But I can definitely say that the slogan 'Kahane tzadak - Kahane was right' has proven itself many times." Several commentators have depicted Feiglin as a fascist.

In 2013, he set forth his legislative agenda regarding Israeli Arabs: "Zero tolerance for Arab citizens' defiance. Enforcement of laws of treason. Enforcement of laws against robbery, rape, and vandalism." Feiglin, responding to a report that Israel's first permanent Arab Supreme Court judge Salim Joubran had refused to sing Israel's national anthem, asserted that Joubran "must return his Israeli ID card and make do with the status of 'permanent resident'".

According to a 2012 article in Haaretz, Feiglin condemned Baruch Goldstein over his killing of 29 Palestinian Muslims in a mosque in the Cave of the Patriarchs massacre, though he did not condemn Goldstein's motivations.

=== Hitler comments ===
In an article in Haaretz, Yossi Sarid quoted Feiglin, in the context of demonstrations against the Oslo accords, as saying, "Hitler was an unparalleled military genius. Nazism promoted Germany from a low to a fantastic physical and ideological status. The ragged, trashy youth body turned into a neat and orderly part of society and Germany received an exemplary regime, a proper justice system and public order. Hitler savored good music. He would paint. This was no bunch of thugs. They merely used thugs and homosexuals." Feiglin clarified his position to the Maariv newspaper that just because he considers Hitler a military genius, this does not mean he admires him.

=== Banned from Britain ===
Feiglin is banned from entering the United Kingdom due to a decision by Home Secretary Jacqui Smith, made public in March 2008, excluding Feiglin on the grounds that his presence in the country "would not be conducive to the public good". A letter to Feiglin from the Home Office said that Smith based her decision on an assessment that his activities "foment or justify terrorist violence in furtherance of particular beliefs; seek to provoke others to terrorist acts; foment other serious criminal activity or seek to provoke others to serious criminal acts; and foster hatred, which might lead to inter-community violence in the UK". Feiglin responded, "Seeing that renowned terrorists like Hizbullah member Ibrahim Mousawi are welcomed in your country in open arms, I understand that your policy is aimed at encouraging and supporting terror."

=== Oslo Accords ===
Feiglin was arrested for organizing mass acts of resistance and blocked highways across Israel during the period in which the Oslo accords were debated and implemented. Feiglin was charged with "break[ing] the barrier of obedience to the rule of law" and incitement to commit crimes. Regarding his organization of peaceful demonstrations and the blocking of intersections without a permit, Feiglin was quoted as stating, "We will do all that it's possible to do, including breaking the law." He was sentenced to six months in prison in 1997 for sedition, and the sentence was later performed via community service.

=== Likud members ===
Relations between Feiglin and his fellow Likud members have been mixed. Likud Knesset member Limor Livnat stated that Feiglin and his friends are "not real Likudniks", and that his faction "cannot be allowed to prevail". In an interview with the Jerusalem Post, Livnat explained that Feiglin and his faction must be prevented "from taking over, or the party and the state will be in danger", adding that, "this is not democracy, this is anarchy".

Despite criticism from fellow Likud members, Feiglin has displayed favorable relations with a significant number of former Likud Knesset members. This was manifest during a Feiglin rally at Jerusalem's Ramada Hotel that took place before the 2008 Likud primary after Feiglin promised to throw all his votes to them if they showed up. Former Likud Knesset members Gila Gamliel, David Mena, Daniel Benlulu, and Ayoub Kara attended the event, despite warnings from Netanyahu's advisers not to do so. Gila Gamliel, who did not vote against the Disengagement from Gaza, eventually took Feiglin's votes and placed 19th, one spot ahead of Feiglin. This ultimately resulted in Feiglin getting pushed down to the 36th spot, and out of the Eighteenth Knesset.

=== Support for Jonathan Pollard ===
Feiglin is a highly vocal supporter of Jonathan Pollard, a former American naval intelligence analyst who formerly served a sentence in the American federal prison system for spying for Israel. Feiglin, who has called Pollard a hero, has written a number of articles in support of Pollard. In a later 2008 article, Feiglin stated that, "Pollard is a Jew who saved the Israelis from American treachery."

=== Criticism of U.S. Vice President Biden ===
Feiglin referred to U.S. Vice President Joseph Biden as a "diseased leper" in a 2010 op-ed column published by Israel's third-largest news outlet, Maariv.

=== Support for cannabis legalization ===
As part of his libertarian political philosophy, Feiglin supports the full legalization of cannabis in Israel, stating of legalization in Amsterdam: "I don't see Amsterdam as a bad thing. ... There's no chaos, there's more freedom for citizens. [Legalization] didn't upend the way of life." And stating that, "This may be one of the reasons why marijuana is illegal. God owns the patent on cannabis, and the large pharmaceutical companies do not appreciate such an intervention in their market and exert their influence accordingly." The opposition of the Knesset Health committee to Feiglin's proposals have led to multiple controversial confrontations in the Knesset. Feiglin says that, "When I expressed my opinion on this issue over a year ago, I had no idea that I had climbed atop such a potent barrel of social dynamite... The debate is not about cannabis. Cannabis is just the tip of the iceberg. The debate is about liberty."

=== Approach to homosexuals ===
Feiglin wrote an article in 2009 entitled "I Am A Proud Homophobe". In 2012, he wrote several posts on his Facebook page detailing his views on gays. "The gay pride parade isn't about rights. It's about forcing the values of the minority onto the majority, effectively locking the majority into the proverbial closet. Homosexual "rights" undermine the normative family, the foundation of our nation."

"Throughout history", Feiglin explained, "from Rome to Europe in our day, the approval and spread of homosexuality presaged the decline of nations and cultures. If one reads the Torah portion 'Noah' - this comes as no surprise. . . . The organizers of a pride parade do not wish to gain rights. They strive to force homosexuality as a culture upon the public sphere. . . . A minority has no right to take over public assets. Let the marchers kindly go back to their individual closets. And let them do it without whining, because no one interferes with their affairs in there. Let them give up their attempts at takeovers, and leave the public sphere to normal people. . . ." Feiglin added in an additional post: "I have no problem with homosexuals, most of whom are, most likely, good and talented people and no one wants to interfere in their private lives. I have a problem with homosexuality as a culture. This culture subverts the status of the family. And without the family there is no nation, and without a nation there is no civilization." Feiglin refused to meet with a gay faction within the Likud, and was quoting as stating: "[A]s individuals I can’t tell them how to lead their lives and I can cooperate with them on different subjects, but as a group that tries to promote an ideology of their sexual orientation, I don’t think they have legitimacy, especially not in the Likud."

In February 2013, Feiglin met with an Israeli gay advocacy group in Tel Aviv, and said he was no longer a homophobe. News accounts of the meeting reported Feiglin's views: "'I am in favor of you having all your human rights, but I am not prepared by the way to invalidate the special value of the classic family', he said, and made it clear that he still opposed gay marriage and same-sex parenting. 'Every child in the world has a right to a mother and father. It has nothing to do with religion, but with my basic perception of the good of the child', he said."

=== Women ===
During his 2013 campaign, Feiglin reiterated his view that women's role in Israeli society should be based on Jewish Biblical principles. In response to a question about feminism, Feiglin was quoted as saying: "'Tel Aviv has become a city that has erased masculinity and where being a man is considered a sickness', and added that feminism has destroyed family values, something essential to Judaism. ... Pressed further, he stated that 'the man is the family, while the woman is the home [literally "house"]', and that in our current culture, we are forgetting 'what it means to be a man'."

When the Jerusalem city government voted to permit sex-segregated public buses, according to the wishes of some ultra-Orthodox (Haredi) Jews, Feiglin supported the action: "I see discrimination against women as despicable. But it is unreasonable to force an ultra-Orthodox bus company to institute mixed seating on its buses against the wishes of its customers." Feiglin also opposes the Israeli army's decision to allow women into combat units.

=== Christians and Christianity ===
Feiglin has criticized some Christian supporters of Israel, such as Glenn Beck, and challenged the sincerity of Christians who have defended Israel, as well as Israeli Jews who supported Beck. "Glenn Beck doesn't back the Jewish mission. What drives him is the Christian mission. I have no problem doing business with him, but he has to respect me when he comes here just like I don't try to force my identity on him when I come to him. Jews like it when Goyim finally smile at them, but sometimes, a smile is more dangerous than a scowl, and this is one of those occasions", Feiglin said. Feiglin also said he had a "deep problem" with Efrat Chief Rabbi Shlomo Riskin participating as a featured speaker at a Christian prayer rally Glenn Beck organized at the Caesarea Amphitheater in Israel. Danny Danon responded to Feiglin, saying: "Israel has too many real foes, and very few genuine friends like Glenn Beck. I cannot understand the urge to reject his friendship with pseudo-theological argumentation... Rejecting friendship is not a sign of national pride, but a proof of very low self-confidence."

=== Petition by "Scholars for Israel and Palestine" ===
In December 2014, a group of academics who are part of the anti-BDS movement and members of The Third Narrative, a Labor Zionist organization, have called on the U.S. and E.U. to impose sanctions on Feiglin and three other Israelis "who lead efforts to insure permanent Israeli occupation of the West Bank and to annex all or parts of it unilaterally in violation of international law". These academics, calling themselves Scholars for Israel and Palestine (SIP) and claiming to be "pro-Israel, pro-Palestine, pro-peace", are asking the U.S. and EU to freeze Feiglin's foreign assets and impose visa restrictions. One of the signatories was quoted in Haaretz as saying the four leaders were chosen because they "were particularly dismissive of Secretary of State Kerry's peace-making efforts, and explicitly call for and work towards the formal annexation of the West Bank or part of it, and thereby push Israel in the direction of violating international law. They are the ones who cross particularly sharp red lines." The group of mainly Jewish academics criticized Feiglin for what they called his "straightforward and undisguised extremism" and "annexationist" agenda.

=== Comments following the 2020 Beirut explosion ===
Celebrating the 2020 Beirut explosions, which killed at least 220 people and injured thousands more, Feiglin referred to the explosion as "a spectacular pyrotechnics show", and wrote:

You don’t actually believe this was some disorganized fuel depot, right? You do realize that this inferno was supposed to land on us as a rain of rockets? [...] Today is Tu B'Av, a day of joy, and a true and huge thank you to G-d and all the geniuses and heroes really (!) who organized for us this wonderful celebration in honor of the day of love.

The Times of Israel reported that the post was subsequently removed by Facebook. Explaining the removal, Facebook stated: “The post was removed because its content mocks the victims, which goes against our policy." Feiglin confirmed the removal of his post via his official Facebook account, claiming to "stand behind every word".

=== Comments during the Gaza war ===
On 12 October 2023, speaking on Israeli TV Channel 14, Feiglin stated of the Gaza war, "If the goal of this operation is not destruction, occupation, expulsion, and settlement, then we have accomplished nothing."

Haaretz reported that while being interviewed by Channel 12 about the Gaza war in June 2024, Feiglin quoted Adolf Hitler stating that Israelis "cannot live in this land if one Islamo-Nazi remains in Gaza." He continued stating that he wanted to "turn Gaza Hebrew" as Jews were "not guests in our own land; it is entirely ours."

In May 2025, during an appearance on Channel 14, Feiglin defended Israel from claims that too many children had been killed in collateral damage, saying: "The enemy is not Hamas, nor is it the military wing of Hamas ... Every child in Gaza is the enemy. We need to occupy Gaza and settle it, and not a single Gazan child will be left there. There is no other victory."

In a 2026 interview on the Knesset Channel, Feiglin called for Gaza's entire population to be expelled by force, proposing that Israel should cut off food and water supplies and allow all Palestinians who refused to leave to "die of thirst".
