= Manhigut Yehudit =

Manhigut Yehudit מנהיגות יהודית
- Leader: Moshe Feiglin
- Founded: 1999
- Dissolved: 2015
- Merged into: Zehut
- Ideology: Religious Zionism; Right-wing populism Social conservatism
- Political position: Right-wing
- Party: Likud (1999-2015)
- Most MKs: 1 (2013-2015)

Election symbol
- ני

Manhigut Yehudit (Hebrew: מנהיגות יהודית, "Jewish Leadership") was a political movement and caucus within the Likud party started by Moshe Feiglin and Shmuel Sackett to lead the State of Israel with, in their words, "authentic Jewish values". This has been widely interpreted, both by Manhigut supporters and outside observers, as Orthodox Judaism, but without a 'Galut' (exile, Jewish diaspora) mentality. The movement opposes religious and secular coercion, and wants Jewish identity, as prescribed by the 'Tanakh' or Hebrew Bible, and authentic Jewish teachings to become Israel's official culture.

Moshe Feiglin at Manhigut Yehudit meeting, Jerusalem, 1 March 2009

In 2005, Manhigut Yehudit became the largest faction within the Likud Central Committee, the body that decides Likud party policy. In 2014, however, Feiglin and the faction's other candidates, Michael Foy and Shai Malka, suffered a crushing defeat in the party primaries, resulting in Feiglin and his followers quitting Likud and announcing the intention to form a new party with the name Zehut - Tnua Yehudit Yisraelit (Identity - Israeli Jewish movement).

== Background ==
The party applied to run in the 1999 elections as an independent party with the election symbol ני, but pulled out before election day. In the 2003 elections, Feiglin was refused permission to run on the Likud list by the Central Elections Committee as Israeli law that states that a person convicted of a crime of "moral turpitude" within the last seven years may not be elected to the Knesset (Feiglin was convicted of blocking Israeli roads in acts of civil disobedience to protest the Oslo Accords in the early 1990s as a co-leader of the Zo Artzeinu movement). Otherwise, he would have taken 38th place on Likud's list and been elected to the Knesset. There was considerable controversy regarding whether blocking roads in political protest could be considered "moral turpitude".

Manhigut Yehudit has received much media attention, and has been the subject of controversy: It has been criticized by the Israeli left and center for its close ties to the radical Israeli right of Religious Zionism. Conversely, the same radical right has characterized the Manhigut project as "naive" in thinking that it can re-shape Israeli politics by "infiltrating" the largely secular (and debatably, pragmatic) right-wing Likud party. Some critics also say that Manhigut diverts valuable resources and supporters that could otherwise be going into other right-wing organizations. Another complaint has been that the Israeli public is significantly more likely to vote for a secular right-Likud than a national-religious one.

Despite all this, Manhigut has a devoted following, both in Israel and abroad, many of whom see Feiglin's "moderate" and long-term approach to work within the parliamentary system (and specifically, to slowly and eventually gain control of the Likud as a powerful bloc) as refreshingly innovative, if not ingenious. They also praise the movement's commitment to Israeli democracy and non-violence (although some detractors note, ironically, that the ultimate goal of Manhigut seems to be to use democracy to replace Israeli law with Halakha).

== Jewish philosophy ==
Moshe Feiglin has defined Jewishness as primarily being a culture and people, not merely a "religion", citing that the Torah refers to Jews as "Am Yisrael" or "The Nation of Israel". In an interview, Feiglin strongly criticized the "modern" tendency to view Judaism through the prism of "only" being a religion, going so far as to link the practice with one of the biggest villains in Jewish tradition, Haman:

...But in fact, the concept "religious" is one taken from other cultures - mainly Christianity - and is totally unsuited to Jewish culture. The first person to use this concept was Haman the Wicked. '... and they do not observe the King's religion', Haman said to Ahashverosh, in order to justify his version of the Final Solution. Christianity, which separated religion from life, created the concept of religion in its Western connotation, with which we are familiar. But Judaism isn't a religion. Judaism is a culture, a nation, a country, the Torah. It is a complete way of life, an important part of which is the observance of Mitzvot."

Manhigut's mission statement, as expressed by co-founder Shmuel Sackett, is "Turning the state of the Jews into the Jewish State". Its ultimate vision and goal is to, in the words of the daily Aleinu prayer, "perfect the world in the Kingdom of the Almighty". All of the organization's newsletters end with this statement.

== Manhigut post-Kadima ==
Ariel Sharon's 2005 split from the Likud resulted in a power vacuum among the leadership of his former party. In December 2005, the top three favorites running for Likud party chairman were Benjamin Netanyahu and Silvan Shalom, with Moshe Feiglin running a distant third.

While Feiglin and his supporters remained optimistic about his chances of winning the position, in the last weeks before the primary, there were calls from both the center-right and the Religious Zionist movement for him to withdraw from the race. The Yesha Council chairman, Bentzi Lieberman, who endorsed Netanyahu, went so far as to characterize Feiglin's plan to co-opt the Likud as a "moral failure". In response, Feiglin compared his detractors with "a battered woman who covers the bruises on her face with make-up and keeps going back to her husband".

In mid-December, Netanyahu won the election for Chairman with 47% of the vote. Shalom came in second with 32%. Feiglin won 12.5% of the votes, up from 3% the first time he ran in 2003. Two years later, in 2007, he came in second behind Netanyahu, with 24% of the vote.

Many left-wing and centrist politicians, as well as some journalists, agreed with Feiglin's assessment, asserting that while he did not come close to winning, the comparatively large number of votes cast for him indicated a radical shift among Likud voters, which could possibly result in changing both its vision and image in the future. Several prominent Likud members also denounced Feiglin's gains as indicative of a serious problem in the party, although others attempted to de-emphasize Feiglin's influence within the Likud. Feiglin responded by accusing his Likud critics of "anti-Semitism".

With all due respect, I also think that there is a certain small element of anti-Semitism here. I have been in the Likud for eight years already, and I haven't seen any such demonization efforts directed at any other element. We are all loyal members of the Likud, and renew our membership every year. Let's put the cards on the table: I believe that if I didn't have a kippa and beard, this demonization would not exist, and it's about time to put an end to this nonsense.

== Rise ==
Feiglin ran against Netanyahu in the 2012 Likud leadership election, held on 31 January 2012, and again received 23% of the vote, and went on to serve as deputy speaker in the 19th Knesset. However, the faction suffered a serious setback in the Likud primary of 31 December 2014, held in the run-up to the 2015 Knesset elections, when he fell to the 36th position on the Likud's electoral list, making it unlikely he would be returned to the Knesset, as the party only had 18 seats in the 19th Knesset, and its most optimistic goal is to win a maximum of 24 seats in the 20th Knesset. Feiglin and his followers quit Likud in the wake of the primary, announcing their intention to found a new party. He was unable to form a new party in time for the 2015 Israeli election in March.

== See also ==
- Moshe Feiglin
