= 2007 Likud leadership election =

Israeli political party leadership election

- 14 August 2007
- Turnout: 39%
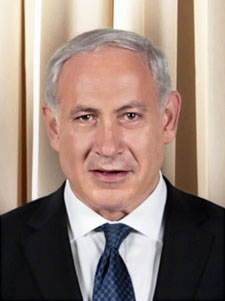

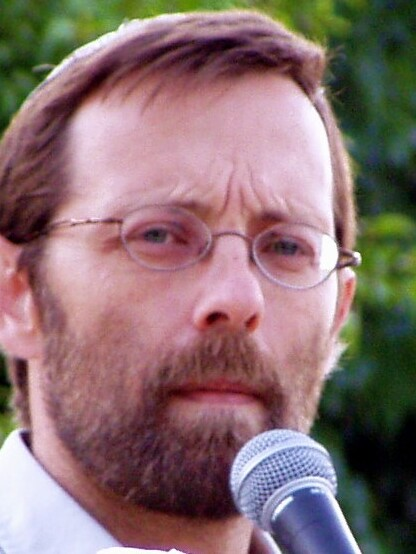
Candidate	Benjamin Netanyahu	Moshe Feiglin
Party	Likud	Likud
Popular vote	27,530	8,847
Percentage	72.8%	23.40%
Likud leader before election
Benjamin Netanyahu
Likud leader after election
Benjamin Netanyahu

A leadership election was held by the Likud party on 15 August 2007. Incumbent Benjamin Netanyahu defeated challengers Moshe Feiglin and Danny Danon by a large majority.

== Background ==
In 2006, legislative elections took place following the incapacitation of Prime Minister Ariel Sharon. The previous year, Sharon had left the Likud and formed the Kadima party, who chose Ehud Olmert as their acting chairman after Sharon's incapacitation. Kadima proceeded to win 29 seats in the election, while the Likud, led by Netanyahu, lost 26 of their 38 seats, winning only twelve.

On 2 July 2007, Netanyahu announced that primaries for the leadership of the Likud, would be conducted earlier than expected, citing the need for unity within the Likud and the belief that general elections would take place in 2008. Attila Somfalvi of Yedioth Ahronoth stated the move was possibly intended to weaken Silvan Shalom, seen as a potential rival of Netanyahu. on 4 July, Netanyahu announced that the primary was to take place before Rosh Hashanah, which was set to occur on 13 September 2007, Shalom requested that the primary take place after the holiday before announcing on 7 July that he would not seek the leadership of the likud, calling the primary's early scheduling 'Illegitimate'. Moshe Feiglin announced his intention to run on 9 July.

On 10 July, the Likud announced that the primary would take place on 14 August, with a second round scheduled for 21 August if necessary. shortly thereafter, Danny Danon announced his intention to run on 17 July.

== Campaign ==
On 25 July, Feiglin accused Netanyahu of attempting to prevent him from running, claiming that a Netanyahu supporter submitted a petition to the Likud's central elections committee to block his candidacy. the court ultimately upheld Feiglin's right to run.

Danon appealed to Christians and Jews from abroad for funding. in addition, he released advertisements claiming that Netanyahu had shifted to the left, and accusing him of being willing to cede the Golan Heights to Syria. responding to low polling numbers, he stated that he did not intend to win, but rather, "to raise important ideological issues".

Netanyahu's campaign argued that Feiglin was the preferred candidate of Ehud Olmert and Ehud Barak, with his chief of staff at the time, Naftali Bennett, remarking that "Every vote for Feiglin weakens Netanyahu and strengthens the Left". concerned that low turnout would increase Feiglin's vote share, Netanyahu worked to raise turnout, sending 96,000 voicemails to eligible voters and calling on party members to vote.

== Candidates ==
- Benjamin Netanyahu, former Prime Minister of Israel, former Minister of Finance, incumbent leader of the Likud (Note: This section only includes positions held before August 2007)
- Moshe Feiglin, leader of Manhigut Yehudit
- Danny Danon, Chairman of the World Likud Organization

=== Declined to run ===
- Silvan Shalom, Member of the Knesset, former Minister of Finance, former Minister of Foreign Affairs

== Results ==
2007 Likud leadership election
Party	Candidate	Votes	%
Likud	Benjamin Netanyahu	27,530	72.80%
Likud	Moshe Feiglin	8,847	23.40%
Likud	Danny Danon	1,426	3.77%
Turnout		37,803	40%

== Aftermath ==
Danon and Feiglin both acknowledged defeat. Feiglin stated that he was pleased with the results, while Danon stated that the results served to pressure Netanyahu to preserve right-wing values. Netanyahu went on to lead the Likud during the 2009 elections, which resulted in him forming a government and becoming the prime minister.
