= 2014 Likud leadership election =

Leadership election in Likud party

- 31 December 2014
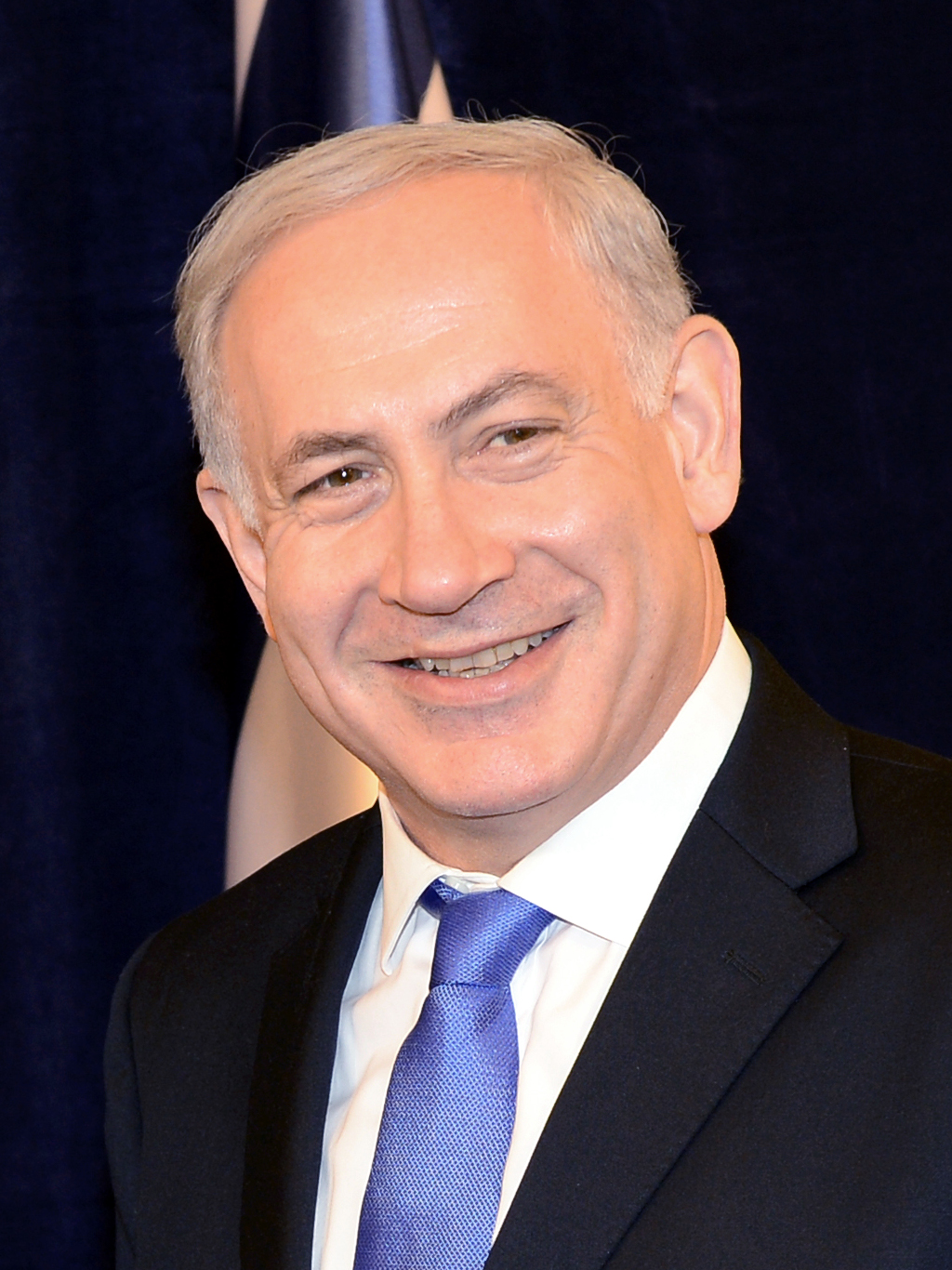

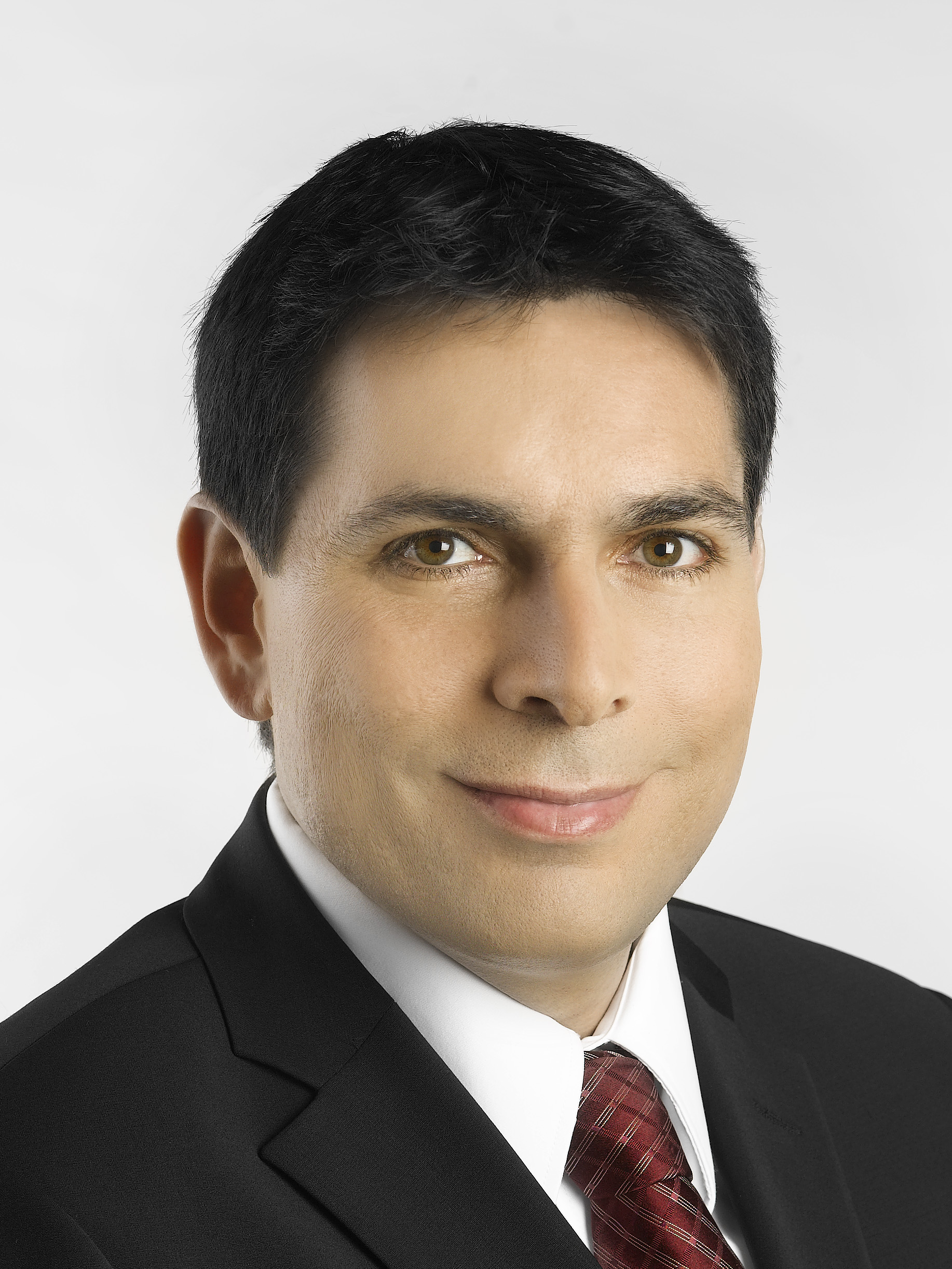
Candidate	Benjamin Netanyahu	Danny Danon
Party	Likud	Likud
Popular vote	33,079	9,687
Percentage	72.87%	21.34%
Likud leader before election
Benjamin Netanyahu
Likud leader after election
Benjamin Netanyahu

A leadership election was held by the Likud party on 31 December 2014. It was won by incumbent Prime Minister and leader of Likud Benjamin Netanyahu.

== Background ==
Incumbent Benjamin Netanyahu was expected from the beginning to run for re-election. Leading an extremely fragile coalition, the Prime Minister wanted to shore up his internal support by holding an extremely early primary, years before the mandated date of a possible election. However, the government collapsed in December 2014, and an early election was mandated for 17 March 2015, over two years earlier than necessary.

== Timing ==
An early poll showed that the prime minister would lose to Gideon Sa'ar in the primary; so, Netanyahu asked the Likud Central Committee to move up the 6 January date to 31 December, to make sure that Sa'ar didn't have the time to mount a campaign. Sa'ar objected to the proposal.

The motion was put to the 3,000 member central committee, who voted in a mini-referendum via secret ballot at ten polling stations throughout the country on 10 December 2014. While Likud did not release numbers, a spokesperson said 2,300 out of 3,700 eligible party members had cast ballots on the measure, which some saw as a litmus test of the prime minister's popularity within the party. After approval by Likud members, Likud's internal court moved the date of the election to 6 January 2015 because the vote lacked a two-thirds majority. Netanyahu appealed the decision. A panel of judges accepted the appeal on 17 December 2014, and allowed the primaries to occur on 31 December 2014.

== Candidates ==
The candidates were:

- Benjamin Netanyahu, incumbent and Prime Minister of Israel
- Danny Danon, chairman of World Likud.

Gideon Sa'ar was a prospective candidate, but he announced on 11 December 2014 that he would not stand for the party's leadership. MK Moshe Feiglin withdrew his candidacy on 18 December 2014, after the Likud court ruled that the primaries for prime minister and the Likud electoral list would occur simultaneously.

== Netanyahu qualification controversy ==
Shai Galili, the comptroller of the party, called for an investigative hearing which would focus on Netanyahu's supposed use of "party resources" to further his candidacy during the Likud primary; the hearing resulted in Netanyahu's disqualification as a candidate for both chairman and a place on the election list. Netanyahu was allowed to run.

== Polling ==
Early polls showed that the prime minister would lose to Gideon Sa'ar in the primary.

== Results ==
Likud leadership election, 2014
Candidate	Votes	Percentage
Benjamin Netanyahu	33,079	72.87%
Danny Danon	9,687	21.34%
Abstained	2,264	4.98%
Total votes	45,390	100%

== Party list ==
In the primary vote for spots on the Likud's electoral list for the Knesset elections, incumbent MKs Moshe Feiglin and Tzipi Hotovely, both on the right wing of the party, failed to win spots high enough on the list to realistically have a chance of being elected to the Knesset, while Internal Affairs minister Gilad Erdan won the second spot on the list, behind Netanyahu, and Miri Regev rose to the 4th slot, up from 12th. Feiglin, who had held the 13th spot in the outgoing Knesset, fell to the unrealistic 36th position, and Hotovely fell from the 18th position to the 26th slot. Likud had 18 seats in the 19th Knesset, and internally expected to win a maximum of 24 seats in the next election.

The top of the Likud's Knesset list was elected as follows:

1. Benjamin Netanyahu
2. Gilad Erdan
3. Yuli Edelstein
4. Yisrael Katz
5. Miri Regev
6. Silvan Shalom
7. Moshe Ya'alon
8. Ze'ev Elkin
9. Tzachi Hanegbi
10. Danny Danon
11. Slot reserved for candidate of Netanyahu's choosing
12. Yuval Steinitz
13. Gila Gamliel
14. Yariv Levin
15. Ofir Akunis
16. David Bitan (slot reserved for candidate from the Shfela region)
17. Haim Katz
18. Jackie Levy (slot reserved for candidate from the Galilee region)
19. Yoav Kish (slot reserved for candidate from the greater Tel Aviv area)
20. Avi Dichter
21. Dudu Amsalem (slot reserved for candidate from Jerusalem area)
22. Miki Zohar (slot reserved for candidate from Negev region)
23. Slot reserved for candidate of Netanyahu's choosing
24. Ayoob Kara
25. Nava Boker
26. Tzipi Hotovely
27. Avraham Neguise (slot reserved for an immigrant)

== See also ==
- 2012 Likud leadership election
- 2019 Likud leadership election
- 2015 Israeli legislative election
