= Zehut =

Israeli libertarian political party

Zehut זהות
- Leader: Moshe Feiglin
- Founded: 2015; 11 years ago
- Split from: Likud
- Headquarters: Tel Aviv
- Ideology: Right-libertarianism; Economic liberalism Ultranationalism; Zionism
- Political position: Right-wing to far-right
- Colours: Light blue
- Knesset: 1 / 120

Election symbol
- ז

Website
- zehut.org.il

Zehut (Hebrew: זֶהוּת, lit. 'identity') is a right-libertarian and nationalist political party in Israel founded in 2015 by Moshe Feiglin. Its platform is centered on promoting individual liberty, with an emphasis on economic freedom and freedom of religion, and the legalization of cannabis. The party also supports the Israeli annexation of the West Bank. The party came close to surpassing the 3.25% electoral threshold in the April 2019 Israeli legislative election, where it garnered a 2.7% share of over 100,000 votes. It won a Knesset seat in the 2026 Israeli legislative election in an alliance with the Religious Zionist Party.

== History ==
=== Manhigut Yehudit ===
The roots of Zehut lie in the Manhigut Yehudit (Jewish Leadership) movement within the Likud party, established in 1995 by Moshe Feiglin in order to attain the country's leadership through it, eventually receiving 23% of the votes in the 2012 Likud leadership election. In the 2013 elections, Feiglin was elected to the 19th Knesset, and served as its Deputy Speaker.

After Prime Minister Benjamin Netanyahu took active steps to block Feiglin's advancement in the party, he reached the conclusion that it would be impossible to affect any political changes while acting within the Likud. In 2015, he left it to form the Zehut party, which was officially registered later that year.

=== Rallies ===
Zehut's first conference, held in 2017 at Hangar 11 in Tel Aviv Port, had over 2,000 attendees.

Idan Mor, a prominent stand-up comedian and cannabis legalization activist known by his pseudonym "Gadi Wilcherski", joined the party in December 2018, and has appeared in most of its rallies since.

=== Polls ===
Prior to 2019, Zehut had never been listed in a poll by media outlets, but internal polling in April 2017 showed that the party could win up to 12 Knesset seats if voters were confident that it would pass the 3.25% threshold. Many pollsters kept excluding Zehut as a pre-written selectable option as late as 11 March 2019.

In July 2018, Zehut announced it would be holding Israel's first open primaries. They were held on 29 January 2019 at voting booths as well as online. About 12,000 people voted in these primaries, which determined the order of the candidates who won in the party's internal primaries in September 2017. One out of every 10 candidates is represented by Zehut International, the party's Jewish diaspora branch.

In late March 2019, a major poll conducted by the National Union of Students found that Zehut was the 2nd-most popular party (after Blue and White) among Israeli college and university students.

=== April 2019 campaign ===
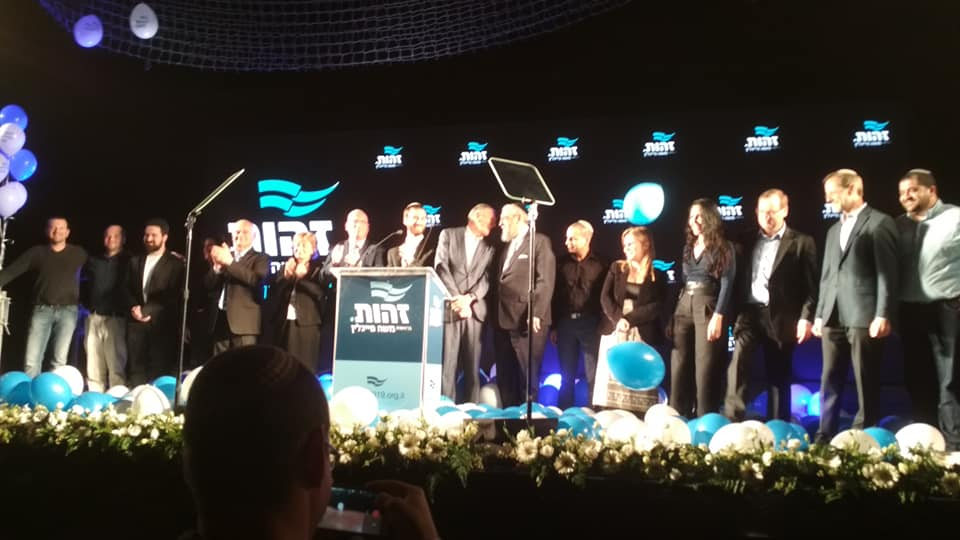
Members of the Zehut party list for the April 2019 elections during the party's campaign inauguration event.

During the campaign for the April 2019 election, Feiglin stated that he did not have a preference between Prime Minister Benjamin Netanyahu and his main election rival Benny Gantz.

Zehut made cannabis legalization a condition for joining any government after the April elections, and would pursue the finance and education ministries. Feiglin also stated that the party will not join a government that is willing to sell out the Land of Israel.

=== September 2019 campaign ===
After narrowly missing the Knesset threshold in the April 2019 election, Feiglin announced on 30 May that Zehut will run in the September snap election. He expressed openness to run as part of an alliance on the right, and urged "all political figures who see themselves as part of the freedom camp" to join it. Feiglin and New Right leader Naftali Bennett discussed a potential electoral alliance (whose leader Feiglin preferred be elected in open primaries) in a meeting that was described as "long and positive".

Feiglin also said that while Zehut's platform and principles had not changed, it would make a number of strategic changes, including clearly emphasizing that it is a right-wing party, and no longer make cannabis legalization a condition for joining any government coalition.

Upon taking the leadership of the New Right and merging with the Union of Right-Wing Parties to form Yamina, Ayelet Shaked expressed openness towards bringing Zehut and Otzma Yehudit into the alliance. Zehut also engaged in direct talks with Otzma Yehudit for a joint list, with backing from Netanyahu after Likud internal polling showed that the two parties together would pass the electoral threshold. Ultimately, however, Feiglin announced that Zehut would be running alone, accusing Shaked of ignoring overtures by his party.

Netanyahu later sent messengers to urge Zehut to drop out of the election, offering to help pay the party’s debts and merge the party into the Likud. However, Feiglin initially declined the offer, claiming that his voter base would support Benny Gantz, Avigdor Lieberman or stay home if that took place. Netanyahu subsequently met with Feiglin to offer him a senior position in the Ministry of Finance, the adoption of some of Zehut's economic policies, and ease access to medical cannabis providing he drop his election bid. Feiglin then declared that if he received an agreeable proposal, he would put it to a vote by Zehut supporters.

On 29 August 2019, Feiglin announced an agreement with Netanyahu had been reached and that Zehut would withdraw from the election, pending approval by the Zehut membership. According to the terms of the agreement, the parties would not merge, but Feiglin would serve as a minister in the next government, and the next government would implement some of Zehut's economic and cannabis reforms.

On 1 September, the Zehut membership approved the deal and the party withdrew from the election.

=== 2020, 2021 abstentions and dissolution ===
The party did not contest the 2020 or 2021 elections.

In July 2021, Feiglin announced that he was rejoining Likud.

=== Reformation ===
In January 2024, Feiglin left Likud and reestablished the party.

=== 2026 campaign and aftermath ===
Feiglin announced in May 2026 that he had allied with former Otzma LeYisrael head Michael Ben-Ari, ahead of the 2026 Israeli legislative election.

Feiglin signed an agreement with Religious Zionist Party (RZP) head Bezalel Smotrich in early September, receiving the second, eighth, tenth and eleventh slots on the RZP list as part of a technical bloc. Feiglin's party won one seat. The following month, Feiglin submitted a request to the Knesset's Arrangements Committee to split from the Religious Zionist Party into a separate faction.

== Platform ==
The party platform of Zehut consists of the following positions:

- Opposition to coercion of all kinds: religious, anti-religious, economic, cultural, or educational; and minimization of state intervention in the life and liberty of private individuals.
- Gradual reduction of the number of government ministries from 29 to 11.
- Legalization of cannabis to be sold by licensed companies, with a consumption age limit of 21 years.
- Lowering taxes by adopting a flat tax rate, equally reducing corporate taxes for all companies, and gradually eliminating tariffs and import quotas.
- Reforming education by introducing a school voucher system on a voluntary basis.
- Reduction of housing prices through land privatization, abolishing planning and building committees, and removing construction freezes in the West Bank.
- Privatization of state-owned hospitals based on contracts with prize and quality conditions.
- Transferring matters of religion and culture from the state to the community. Separation of church and state.
- Reforming the judicial system by splitting it into one of common/civil law and one of Halakha (Jewish law) that can only exercise jurisdiction over individuals who have consented thereto.
- Abolishing the Chief Rabbinate's monopoly over personal issues, and reducing its budget to local voluntary taxation only.
- Abolishing marriage registration; marriage will be defined individually by each couple.
- Protection of free speech and media, and abolishing mandatory broadcasting licenses.
- Protection of the right to keep and bear arms, and extending it to all citizens (not only ex-soldiers) without a violent past or certain physical or mental limitations.
- Elimination of police brutality by outlawing the use of force against non-violent civil disobedience, and allowing communities to appoint their own local police chiefs.
- Abolishing the biometric database, as it infringes the right to privacy.
- Applying full Israeli sovereignty to all parts of the Land of Israel.
  - In the West Bank: Nullification of the Oslo Accords.
  - In the Gaza Strip: Any attack by Hamas against Israel must be responded to by a full re-conquest of Gaza (though unnecessary small incursions must be avoided).
  - Terrorists will be offered the option of peaceful withdrawal, and individual non-Jews will be offered three options: financially assisted emigration to a destination of their choice; permanent residency status (equal rights, except for national voting rights) after having declared their loyalty to Israel and been thoroughly vetted; or Israeli citizenship (full equal rights) when doing military or national service.
- Gradual transition of the Israel Defense Forces (IDF) from a conscription to a professional volunteer army, drafting citizens only for the most basic training.
- Ending all US aid to Israel along with its conditions, as it damages Israel's economic independence and trade freedom.

== Knesset member ==
Knesset	Members	Seats
26th (2026-)	Moshe Feiglin	1 / 120

== Leader ==
Leader	Took office	Left office
Moshe Feiglin	2015; 2024–present	2021

== Election results ==
=== Knesset ===
Election	Leader	Votes	%	Seats	+/−	Government
Apr 2019	Moshe Feiglin	118,031	2.7 (#13)	0 / 120	New	Extra-parliamentary
Sep 2019	Moshe Feiglin	Withdrew		0 / 120	0	Extra-parliamentary
2020	Moshe Feiglin	Did not contest		0 / 120	0	Extra-parliamentary
2021	Moshe Feiglin	Did not contest		0 / 120	0	Extra-parliamentary
2022	Moshe Feiglin	Did not contest		0 / 120	0	Extra-parliamentary
2026	Moshe Feiglin	with RZP (Note: received 290,451 or 5.10%)		1 / 120	▲1	TBA

== See also ==
- List of political parties in Israel
