= 2002 Likud leadership election =

Likud leadership election

- 28 November 2002
- Turnout: 46.24%
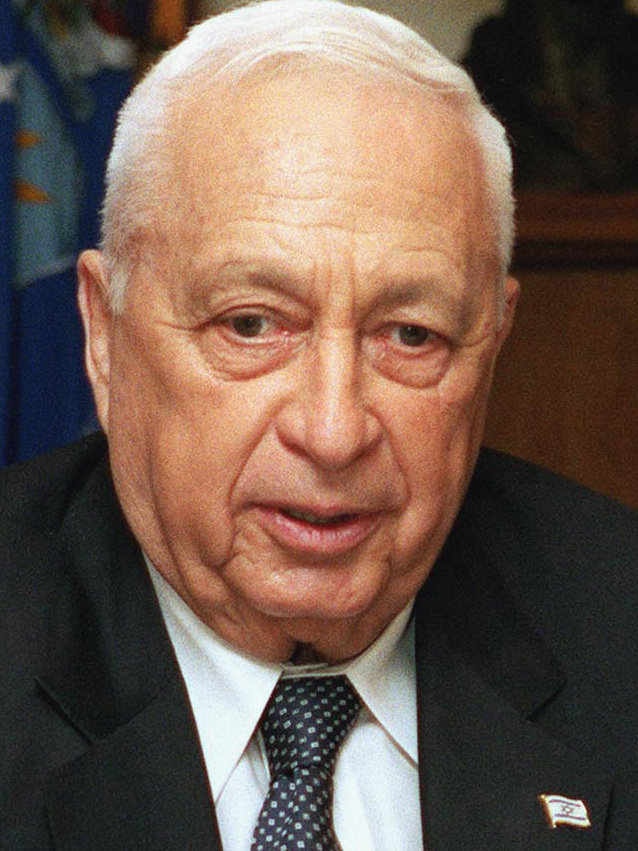

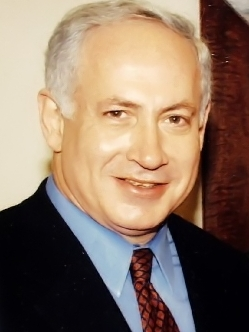

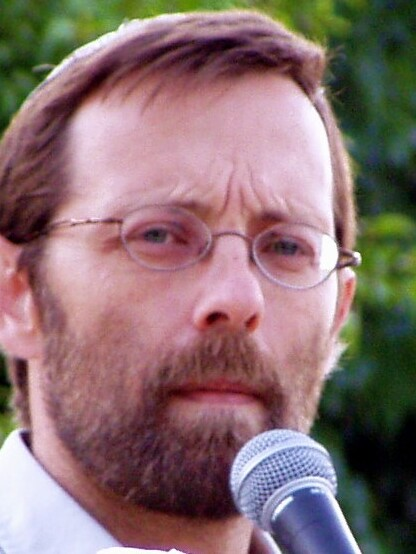
Candidate	Ariel Sharon	Benjamin Netanyahu	Moshe Feiglin
Party	Likud	Likud	Likud
Popular vote	78,740	56,480	4,870
Percentage	55.88%	40.08%	3.46%
Leader before election
Ariel Sharon
Elected Leader
Ariel Sharon

The 2002 Likud leadership election was held on 28 November 2002 to elect the leader of the Likud party. Incumbent prime minister and party leader Ariel Sharon was reelected, fending off a challenge from former prime minister and party leader Benjamin Netanyahu, as well as a lesser challenge from Moshe Feiglin.

== Candidates ==
- Moshe Feiglin, co-founder of the Manhigut movement
- Benjamin Netanyahu, incumbent minister of foreign affairs, former prime minister (1996–1999), former Likud party leader (1993–1999)
- Ariel Sharon, incumbent prime minister and Likud party leader

== Campaign ==
The election was held ahead of the 2003 Israeli legislative election, a snap election that Sharon had called as prime minister. While Sharon enjoyed high approval among the general public, his move towards the political center had offput many in they party's right-wing base, making him appear vulnerable in the party's leadership election. Three hours after he announced the snap election, former prime minister and party leader Benjamin Netanyahu declared his candidacy for the leadership election.

Originally, Netanyahu stated that he planned to campaign on the economy. But he pivoted quickly to an all-out attack on Sharon's potential plans for pursuing a two-state solution. Sharon, on the other hand, campaigned, in part, by contrasting his broad electoral success in the 2001 Israeli prime ministerial election with Netanyahu's narrow 1996 victory and his broad 1999 loss.

Days before the vote, a poll of Likud members projected that Sharon would defeat Netanyahu by 16 or 18 percent.

== Electorate ==
The leadership election was open to the party's general membership, which, at the time, numbered at 305,000.

== Result ==
2002 Likud leadership election
Party	Candidate	Votes	%
Likud	Ariel Sharon (incumbent)	78,740	55.88
Likud	Benjamin Netanyahu	56,480	40.08
Likud	Moshe Feiglin	4,870	3.46
Turnout			46.24

== See also ==
- 2002 Israeli Labor Party leadership election
