= 2017 Italian Left leadership election =

- 17–19 February 2017
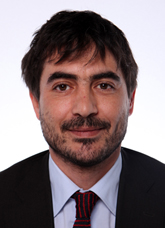
| Nominee | Nicola Fratoianni |
| Party | SI |
| Popular vote | 503 |
| Percentage | 94.0% |
Secretary before election
Office established
Elected Secretary
Nicola Fratoianni

The 2017 Italian Left leadership election was a congressional primary election held on 17,18 and 19 February 2017.

The Italian Left is a left-wing party of Italy. It was launched in November 2015 as a parliamentary group in the Chamber of Deputies, mainly including Left Ecology Freedom, dissidents from the Democratic Party (see Future to the Left) and splinters from the Five Star Movement. In February 2017 it was officially born as a party.

== Candidates ==
The two main candidates were Nicola Fratoianni and Arturo Scotto. Fratoianni was a member of the Communist Refoundation Party and then of Nichi Vendola's Left Ecology Freedom, of which he became Coordinator. He is considered the leader of the left-wing faction, which opposes an alliance with the centre-left Democratic Party. Fratoianni's aim is to create a left-wing party inspired by the Greek Syriza of Alexis Tsipras and the Spanish Podemos of Pablo Iglesias Turrión.

Arturo Scotto was a member of the social-democratic Democrats of the Left (predecessor of the centre-left Democratic Party) and then of Left Ecology Freedom. He is considered the leader of the right-wing faction, who supports an alliance with the Democratic Party and the creation of a centre-left coalition. Scotto always denied an alliance with the Democrats if their leader will remain the former Prime Minister Matteo Renzi, who is considered too centrist and liberal.

On 2 February 2017, Scotto announced the withdrawal of his candidature due to the primary rules, which prevented the popular vote. After a few days Scotto left the party, along with 18 deputies.

| Portrait | Name | Most recent position | Refs |
|---|---|---|---|
| | Nicola Fratoianni (1972–) | Member of the Chamber of Deputies (2013–present) Other positions: Coordinator of Left Ecology Freedom (2014–2016) | |
| | Arturo Scotto (1979–) | Member of the Chamber of Deputies (2013–2018) Other positions: Leader of Left Ecology Freedom in the Chamber of Deputies (2014–2016); Member of the Chamber of Deputies (2006–2008) | |

== Results ==
| Candidate | Votes | % |
|---|---|---|
| Nicola Fratoianni | 503 | 94.0% |
| Against | 32 | 6.0% |
| Abstentions | 28 | – |
| Total | 563 | 100.0 |

Vote
| Fratoianni | 94.0% |
| Against | 6.0% |
