= 2012 Likud leadership election =

Leadership election in Likud party

- 31 January 2012
- Turnout: 50.4%
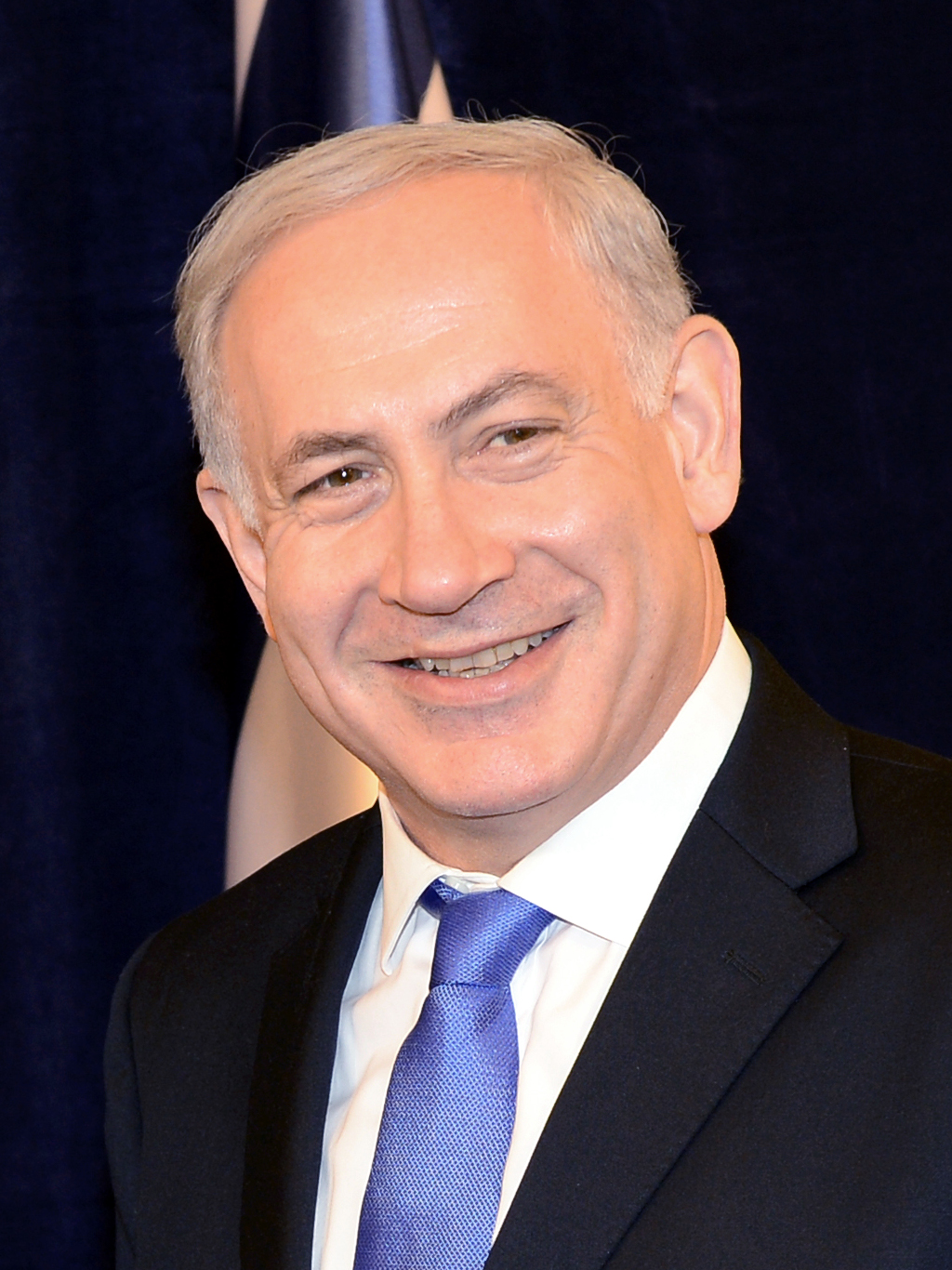

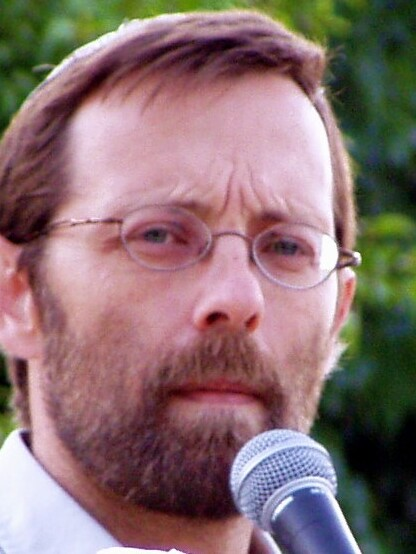
Candidate	Benjamin Netanyahu	Moshe Feiglin
Party	Likud	Likud
Alliance		Manhigut Yehudit
Popular vote	48,490	14,660
Percentage	76.79%	23.21%
Likud leader before election
Benjamin Netanyahu
Likud leader
Benjamin Netanyahu

An election for the leadership of Likud was held on 31 January 2012.

== Background ==
Incumbent Benjamin Netanyahu was expected from the beginning, failing a political crisis to run for re-election. Silvan Shalom and Moshe Feiglin were touted as potential candidates to oppose Netanyahu. However, Shalom declined to run. On 29 December 2011, Feiglin announced his candidacy.

== Candidates ==
- Moshe Feiglin, leader of the Manhigut Yehudit faction
- Benjamin Netanyahu, incumbent and Prime Minister of Israel

Declined

- Silvan Shalom

Other

- Vladimir Herczberg, nuclear physicist and perennial candidate - attempted to run, but was not listed in the ballot

== Campaign ==
Feiglin wishes to "restore Jewish values", and fight against secularism and socialism. He wants to end US aid to Israel, and cancel the Oslo Accords. He accused Netanyahu of "lying" about expanding Jewish settlements in the West Bank. Feiglin has worked to rally support from Likud voters in the West Bank, warning that Netanyahu will "turn left" and freeze construction again. Feiglin hoped to get at least 20% in the primaries, although he received 24% during the last primaries. Netanyahu has said to his campaign that Feiglin must not get over 20%.

Feiglin was mentioned by supporters of Ron Paul, a candidate for the Republican nomination for President of the United States, responding to claims that Paul is anti-Israel due to his opposition to foreign aid. Feiglin refused to endorse any candidate, saying he does not like when Americans interfere in Israeli politics. However, he said he agrees with Ron Paul on foreign aid, and with Newt Gingrich on the historical status of Palestinians.

He said Israel should have attacked Iran's nuclear program long ago, and that would be his first act in office.

On 3 January 2012, Feiglin launched his campaign with hundreds of supporters at the Ramada Renaissance Hotel in Jerusalem, and outlined his platform. He would "keep the entire Land of Israel, build throughout the land, expel enemies and infiltrators, and go up to the Temple Mount to sacrifice the Paschal Lamb". In addition, he would appoint a Likud defense minister, criticizing Netanyahu for maintaining former Labor leader Ehud Barak, properly equip soldiers for missions, demand that [U.S. President] Obama release Jonathan Pollard, and prevent a Meretz take-over of the Israeli Supreme Court. Supporters were encouraged to promote the candidacy of Feiglin, and convince Likud voters to vote for him.

A poll released on 16 January 2012 by Ma'agar Mochot showed Netanyahu leading Feiglin 51% to 35%, with 14% of Likud members undecided.

Netanyahu defeated Feiglin, winning 77% of the vote. Feiglin's campaign accused Netanyahu supporters of preventing voters from voting. Analysts have claimed that Netanyahu's inability to win 80% is a "failure".

In addition, allegations of "vote-fixing" were raised, indicating that Feiglin may have won a significantly higher percentage of the vote. These allegations were never followed up with a formal complaint, as they would not have resulted in a victory for Feiglin.

== Polling ==
Poll	Date	Netanyahu	Feiglin	Undecided
Ma'agar Mochot	16 January 2012	51%	35%	14%

== Results ==
Turnout stood at 50.4%

Likud leadership election, 2012
Candidate	Votes	Percentage
Benjamin Netanyahu	~48,490	76.79%
Moshe Feiglin	~14,660	23.21%

== See also ==
- 2013 Israeli legislative election
- 2012 Kadima leadership election
- 2014 Likud leadership election
- 2019 Likud leadership election
