= Silvan Shalom =

Israeli politician (born 1958)

- סילבן שלום
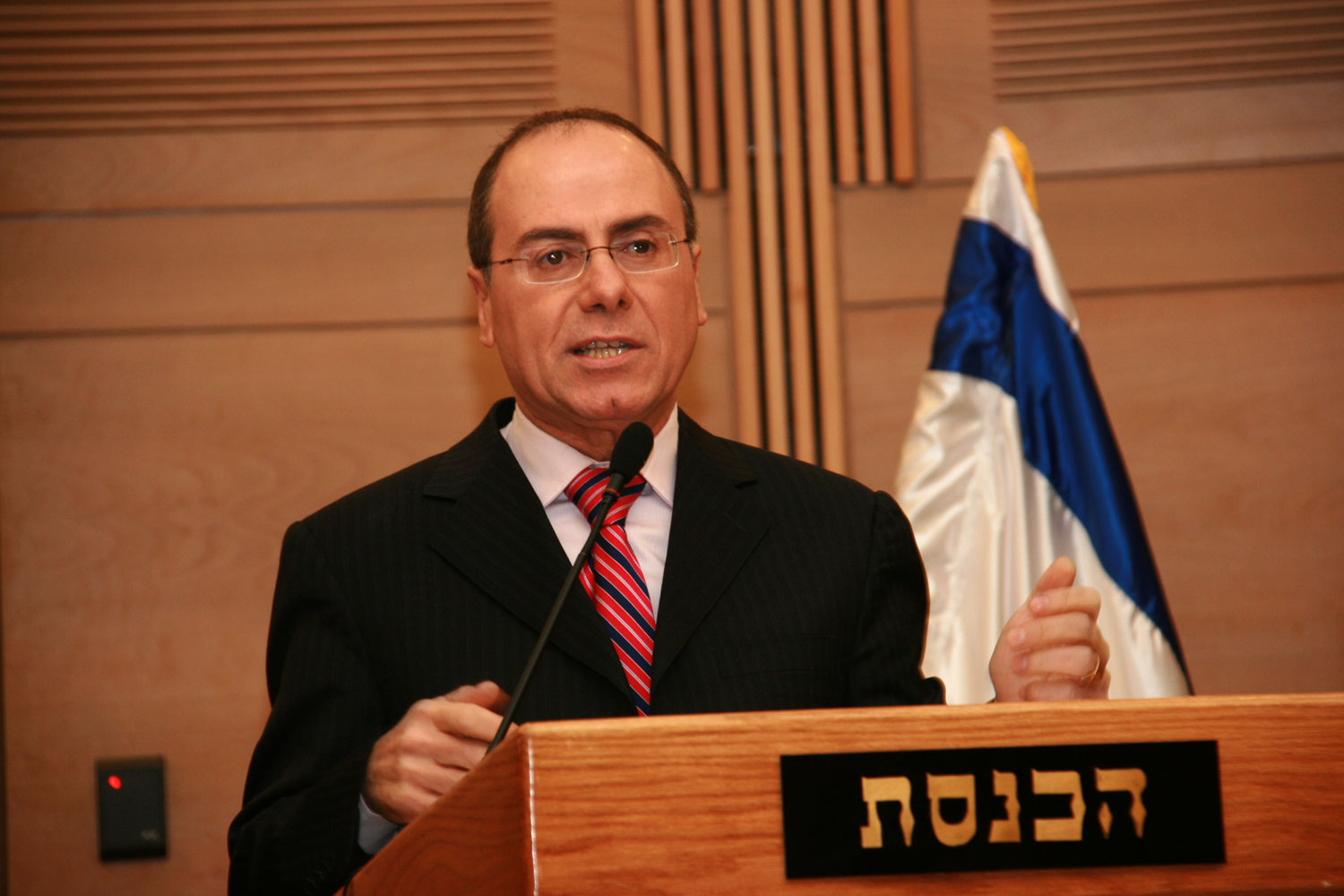

Ministerial roles
- 1998–1999: Minister of Science & Technology
- 2001–2003: Minister of Finance
- 2001–2006: Deputy Prime Minister
- 2003–2006: Minister of Foreign Affairs
- 2009–2013: Vice Prime Minister
- 2009–2015: Minister for Regional Development
- 2009–2015: Minister for the Development of the Negev & Galilee
- 2013–2015: Minister of National Infrastructure, Energy & Water Resources
- 2015: Vice Prime Minister
- 2015: Minister of the Interior

Faction represented in the Knesset
- 1992–2015: Likud

Personal details
- Born: 4 August 1958 (age 68) Gabès, Tunisia

Zion Silvan Shalom (Hebrew: ציון סילבן שלום; born 4 August 1958) is an Israeli politician who served as a member of the Knesset for Likud between 1992 and 2015. He held several prominent ministerial positions, including Vice Prime Minister and Minister of the Interior. He resigned on 24 December 2015 following allegations of sexual harassment. Later on, the Attorney-General closed this investigation and said these claims were unsubstantiated.

== Early life ==
Shalom was born in Gabès, Tunisia on 4 August 1958 to a family that traced its roots to the Sephardic Beit Shalom dynasty. His family moved to Israel in 1959, settling in the city of Beersheba in the Negev. On 3 November 1964, when Shalom was six years old, his father Shimon Shalom, a bank manager and a member of the Betar movement, was killed during the course of a bungled bank robbery. The murder was notoriously known as the first committed in a bank robbery in the history of the young State of Israel. At the age of 18, Shalom was inducted into the Israel Defense Forces (IDF) and rose to the rank of sergeant.

== Education and early career ==
After completing his service in the IDF, Shalom attended Ben-Gurion University of the Negev in Beersheba, from which he received a BA in economics and earned his certification as a Certified Public Accountant. During that time, Shalom was elected as the chairman of the university's students' union and later as the vice chairman of the national students union. He then studied law and public policy at Tel Aviv University. He received an LLB and was certified as a lawyer, and a received a Master's degree in public policy.

Shalom began his career as a journalist. While working on his bachelor's degree, he wrote for Yedioth Aharonoth, a daily newspaper, in its students section. Afterwards he started working at the Rosh Berosh magazine and in the Negev's local newspaper. In 1980, he moved to Tel Aviv and started working at the now-defunct daily Hadashot. In 1984, he was appointed as its head political and economic correspondent.

== Political career ==
In 1985, Shalom was appointed adviser to the Finance Minister, Yitzhak Moda'i, who was later appointed Justice Minister. At the age of 31, he was appointed director-general of the Energy Ministry and two years later, in 1990, he was appointed director-general of the Israel Electric Corporation.

=== Knesset member ===
In 1992, at the age of 34, Shalom was 34th on the Likud list for the 13th Knesset, but the party received only 33 seats in the elections. When former Defense Minister Moshe Arens resigned, Shalom succeeded him as an MK.

As a young MK, his first bill was in the academic field. In 1992 there was room for only 100,000 university students, with no space for more. Shalom acted to allow all students to be accepted once others left their academic institutions at the end of their first year. His bill increased awareness about the problem and, as a result, Israeli colleges were established to expand access to academic studies. In 2010, for the first time, more students were enrolled in colleges than universities. Shalom, during his first term, was the first male MK to be a member of the Knesset's committee on the status of women. He was also the chairman of the subcommittee regarding the capital market, chairman of the subcommittee of energy and a member of the economic affairs committee.

=== Deputy Defense Minister ===
Following the 1996 election, Shalom, who won the 18th spot in the combined list of Likud and two other conservative parties, became Deputy Defense Minister under the minister Yitzhak Mordechai. One of his biggest achievements was enabling Hareidi Jews to serve in the army, a step that they had been avoiding for decades. The Hareidi battalion, "Netzah Yehuda", was established in February 1999.

== Minister of Science ==
After a rotation with MK Michael Eitan, Shalom, on 13 July 1998, became Minister of Science. During his year in office he created the "science flowers" project, which helped universities reach Israel's periphery and helped underprivileged students excel. Another main project Shalom was involved in was in expanding Internet and broadband access in Israel.

== MK in the opposition (1999–2001) ==
In the 1999 election, the Likud party, headed by the widely unpopular prime minister at the time, Benjamin Netanyahu, was running against the Labor party, headed by Ehud Barak. Labor won 26 seats in the Knesset, while Likud received only 19 seats and lost the election. After Labor gained power in 1999 and following Netanyahu's resignation, Shalom became number one on the Likud list and became part of the opposition led by Ariel Sharon.

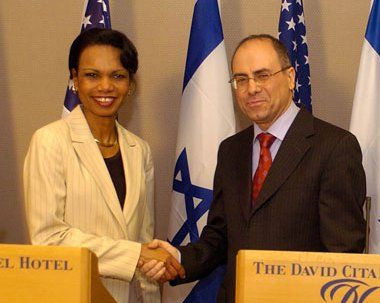
Condoleezza Rice and Silvan Shalom

=== Since 2001 ===
Shalom was the runner-up to Netanyahu for party leadership in December 2005 and was granted the second spot on the Likud list to the 2006 general election and thus did not compete in its 11 January 2006 primaries. He was placed seventh on the party's list for the 2009 elections.

In January 2010, he asked Pope Benedict XVI to open the wartime archives of the papacy of Pius XII.

As Energy Minister Shalom led an Israeli delegation to Abu Dhabi on renewable energy in January 2014. The visit was controversial, as the United Arab Emirates did not maintain diplomatic relations with Israel and no Israeli leaders had traveled there since the assassination of Mahmoud al-Mabhouh in 2010.

In May 2012, during a meeting with Likud activists in the city of Rehovot, Shalom said about the heads of Likud opposition to founding of a Palestinian state, "We are all against a Palestinian state, there is no question about it."

Following the 2015 elections Shalom was appointed Interior Minister and Vice Prime Minister.

=== Sexual harassment allegations ===
On 24 March 2014, a woman complained that Shalom had sexually harassed her at work more than 15 years before. The police investigation was closed several months later by the Attorney General, Yehuda Weinstein, since the statute of limitations had already passed. Two other former employees also accused him of touching them against their will. All three alleged he had cornered them on various occasions and tried to kiss them. One woman said she was once summoned to a Jerusalem hotel room where Shalom was staying, only to find him waiting for her on the bed, wearing nothing but a bathrobe. Another said, "He kissed me against my will, and when I tried to get away, he chased me into the bathroom." The third woman said that during one of their meetings, Shalom "told me he's had intimate thoughts about me for years and that he wanted to see me outside the office."

In the aftermath, Shalom decided not to submit his candidacy for the position of President of Israel. He had been considered a front-runner for the post before the allegation was made.

In late 2015, new allegations were made by women, triggering Shalom's announcement on 21 December that he would withdraw from public life and resign. He denied all the allegations. "For some 23 years, I have served the public with determination and faith as an MK and a minister in various offices out of a feeling I was fulfilling a mission and a desire to advance important social and public goals, but I have had enough of the torment inflicted on me and my family," Shalom said in a statement announcing his resignation. "My family supports me, but there is no justification for the price they've had to pay." He was replaced by Amir Ohana as a member of Knesset.

The Attorney General instructed the Major Crimes Unit of the Israel Police to examine the new allegations. On 30 June 2016, Attorney-General Avichai Mandelblit ended the preliminary examination of the allegations. The Justice Ministry issued a statement reading: "Some of the women could not be located, or there was no grounds to approach them due to the quality of the information concerning them; some didn't confirm the claims, and some didn't rule out the claims, but decisively refused to give testimony to the police. Regardless, in some of the cases the statute of limitations expired on the information." Only one of the accusers filed an official police report. On 3 July 2016, a group of Members of Knesset and party activists began efforts to bring Shalom back into politics.

== Personal life ==
From 1993 to 2017 Shalom was married to Israeli talk show host Judy Shalom Nir-Mozes. The couple have five children, including two sons from Mozes previous marriage.
