= Thirty-seventh government of Israel =

Cabinet formed after 2022 election

Sixth Netanyahu cabinet
- 37th Cabinet of Israel
- Incumbent
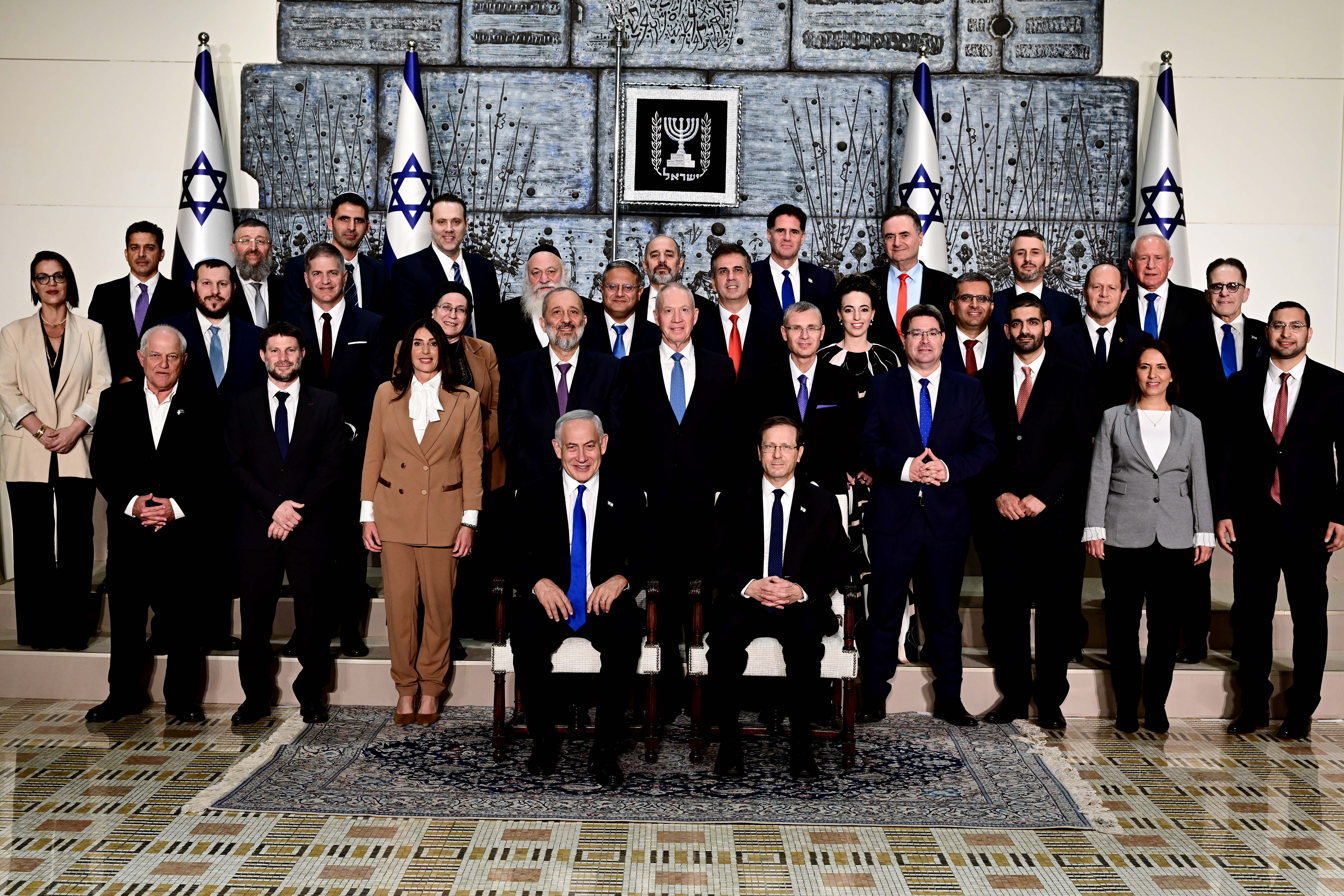
- Ministers of the government with President Herzog
- Date formed: 29 December 2022

People and organisations
- President: Isaac Herzog
- Prime minister: Benjamin Netanyahu
- No. of ministers: 25
- Member parties: Likud; Religious Zionist Party; Noam (29 Dec 2022–28 Feb 2023; 25 May 2023–24 Mar 2025); New Hope (13–25 Mar 2024; 29 Sep 2024–13 Aug 2025) (Note: New Hope was part of National Unity from August 2022 to March 2024, when it became a separate Knesset faction, it merged with Likud on 13 August 2025.); National Unity (12 Oct 2023–9 Jun 2024); Otzma Yehudit (29 Dec 2022–21 Jan 2025; 19 Mar 2025–present); UTJ (29 Dec 2022–15 Jul 2025); Shas (10 Nov 2022–17 Jul 2025) (Note: Shas exited the government, though it remains part of the coalition.)
- Status in legislature: Caretaker government
- Opposition parties: Yesh Atid; National Unity (until 2023; since 2024); Blue & White; Yisrael Beiteinu; Ra'am; Hadash–Ta'al; Labor; New Hope (2024); Otzma Yehudit (2025) (Note: The party announced plans to support the government outside the coalition); Noam (since 2025); UTJ (since 2025)
- Opposition leader: Yair Lapid

History
- Incoming formation: 2018–2022 political crisis
- Election: 2022 Knesset election
- Legislature terms: 25th Knesset
- Predecessor: 36th government
- Successor: 38th government

The thirty-seventh government of Israel is the current cabinet of Israel, formed on 29 December 2022, following the Knesset election the previous month. The coalition government currently consists of four parties — Likud, Shas, Otzma Yehudit, Religious Zionist Party — and is led by Benjamin Netanyahu, who took office as the prime minister of Israel for the sixth time. The government is widely regarded as the most right-wing government in the country's history, particularly with the inclusion of Otzma Yehudit and Religious Zionism.

Several of the government's policy proposals have led to controversies, both within Israel and abroad, with the government's attempts at reforming the judiciary leading to a wave of demonstrations across the country. Following the outbreak of the Gaza war, opposition leader Yair Lapid initiated discussions with Netanyahu on the formation of an emergency government.

On 11 October 2023, National Unity MKs Benny Gantz, Gadi Eisenkot, Gideon Sa'ar, Hili Tropper, and Yifat Shasha-Biton joined the Security Cabinet of Israel to form an emergency national unity government. Their accession to the Security Cabinet and to the government (as ministers without portfolio) was approved by the Knesset the following day. Gantz, Netanyahu, and Defense Minister Yoav Gallant became part of the newly formed Israeli war cabinet, with Eisenkot and Ron Dermer serving as observers. National Unity left the government in June 2024. New Hope rejoined the government in September. Otzma Yehudit announced on 19 January 2025 that it had withdrawn from the government, which took effect on 21 January, following the cabinet's acceptance of the three-phase Gaza war ceasefire proposal, though it rejoined two months later. United Torah Judaism left the government in July 2025 over dissatisfaction with the government's draft conscription law. Shas left the government several days later, though it remained a part of the coalition. New Hope merged with Likud in August 2025.

The cabinet was reduced to a caretaker government after Netanyahu's bloc lost its majority in the 2026 Israeli legislative election.

== Background ==
The right-wing bloc of parties, led by Benjamin Netanyahu, known in Israel as the national camp, won 64 of the 120 seats in the elections for the Knesset, while the coalition led by the incumbent prime minister Yair Lapid won 51 seats. The new majority has been variously described as the most right-wing government in Israeli history, as well as Israel's most religious government.

Shortly after the elections, Lapid conceded to Netanyahu, and congratulated him, wishing him luck "for the sake of the Israeli people". On 15 November, the swearing-in ceremony for the newly elected members of the 25th Knesset was held during the opening session. The vote to appoint a new Speaker of the Knesset, which is usually conducted at the opening session, as well as the swearing in of cabinet members were postponed since ongoing coalition negotiations had not yet resulted in agreement on these positions.

== Government formation ==
Israeli government formation, November 2022
- November 2022
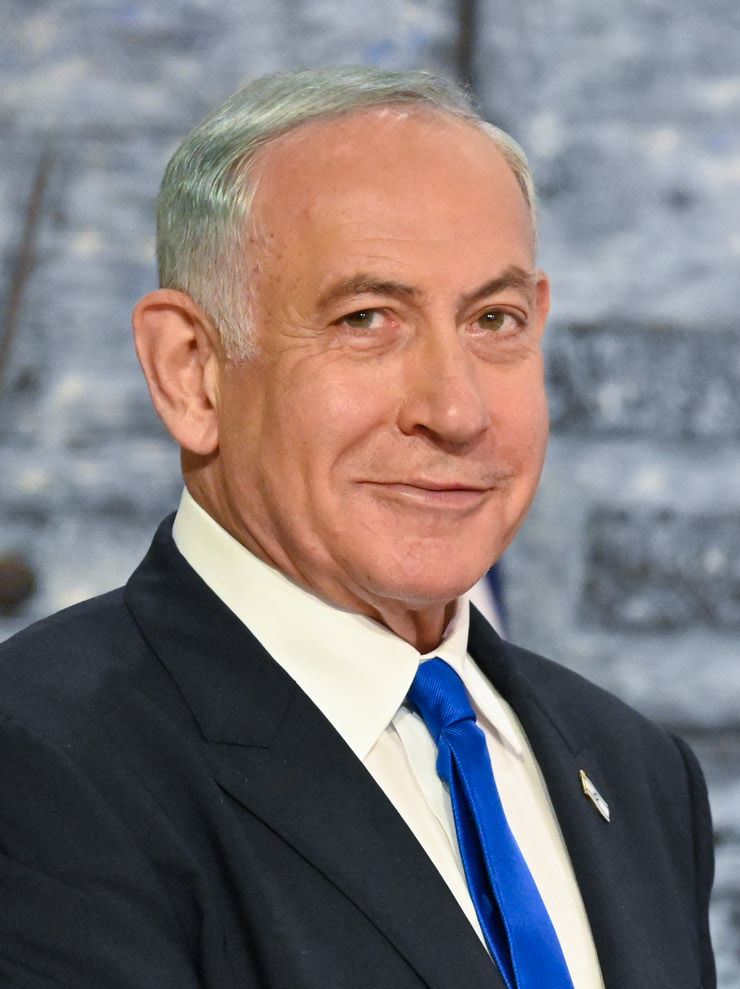

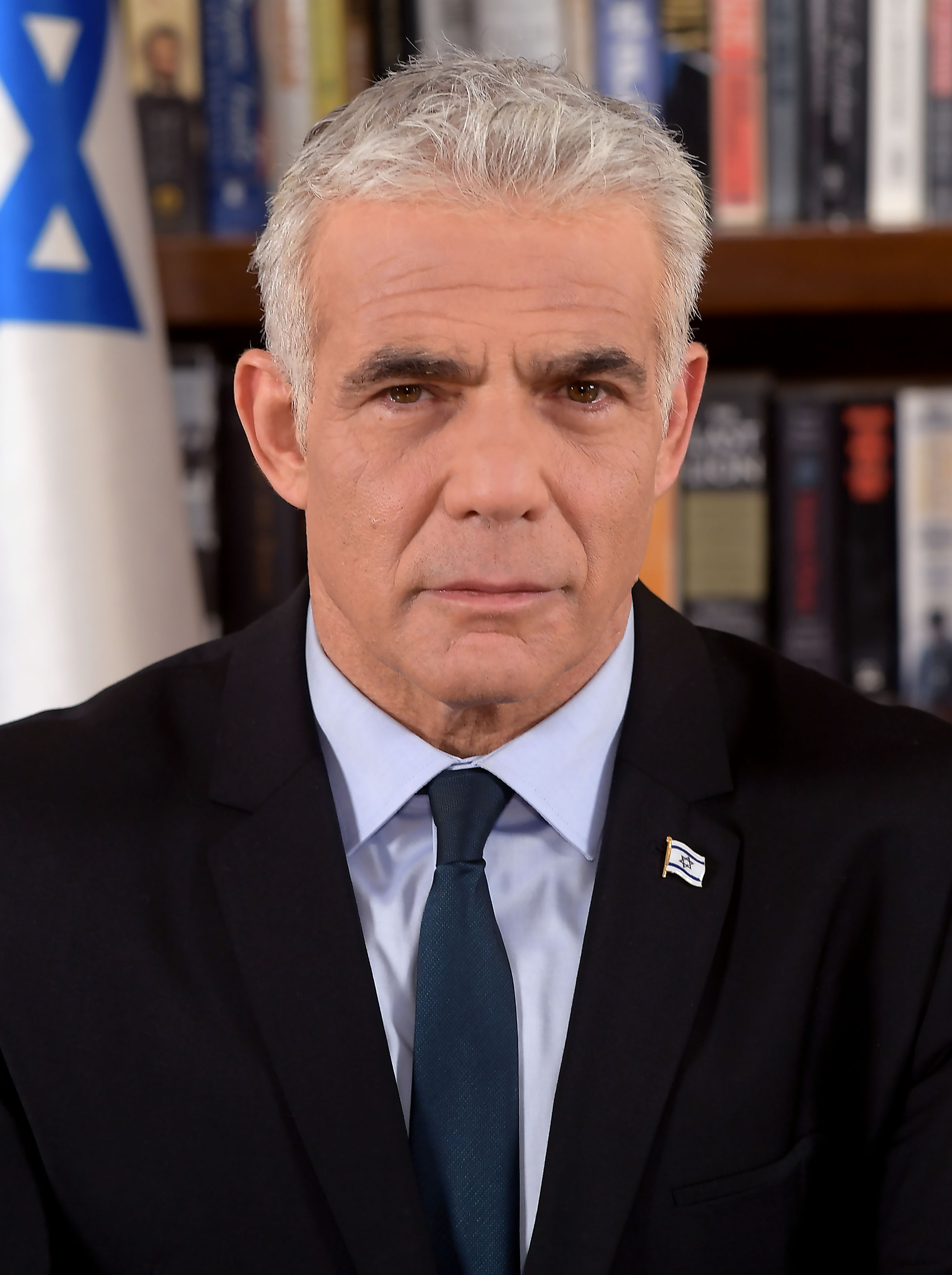
| Nominee | Benjamin Netanyahu | Yair Lapid |
| Party | Likud | Yesh Atid |
| Electoral vote | 64 | 28 |
Prime Minister before election
Yair Lapid
Yesh Atid
Prime Minister After
Benjamin Netanyahu
Likud

| Party | Party leader | Seats | Recommended |
|---|---|---|---|
| Likud | Benjamin Netanyahu | 32 | Netanyahu |
| Yesh Atid | Yair Lapid | 24 | Lapid |
| Religious Zionist | Bezalel Smotrich | 14 | Netanyahu |
| National Unity | Benny Gantz | 12 | No one |
| Shas | Aryeh Deri | 11 | Netanyahu |
| UTJ | Moshe Gafni | 7 | Netanyahu |
| Yisrael Beiteinu | Avigdor Lieberman | 6 | No one |
| Ra'am | Mansour Abbas | 5 | No one |
| Hadash-Ta'al | Ayman Odeh | 5 | No one |
| Labor | Merav Michaeli | 4 | Lapid |

On 3 November 2022, Netanyahu told his aide Yariv Levin to begin informal coalition talks with allied parties, after 97% of the vote was counted. The leader of the Shas party Aryeh Deri met with Yitzhak Goldknopf, the leader of United Torah Judaism and its Agudat Yisrael faction, on 4 November. The two parties agreed to cooperate as members of the next government. The Degel HaTorah faction of United Torah Judaism stated on 5 November that it will maintain its ideological stance about not seeking any ministerial posts, as per the instruction of its spiritual leader Rabbi Gershon Edelstein, but will seek other senior posts like Knesset committee chairmen and deputy ministers.

Netanyahu himself started holding talks on 6 November. He first met with Moshe Gafni, the leader of Degel HaTorah, and then with Goldknopf. Meanwhile, the Religious Zionist Party leader Bezalel Smotrich and the leader of its Otzma Yehudit faction Itamar Ben-Gvir pledged that they would not enter the coalition without the other faction. Gafni later met with Smotrich for coalition talks. Smotrich then met with Netanyahu. On 7 November, Netanyahu met with Ben-Gvir who demanded the Ministry of Public Security with expanded powers for himself and the Ministry of Education or Transport and Road Safety for Yitzhak Wasserlauf. A major demand among all of Netanyahu's allies was that the Knesset be allowed to ignore the rulings of the Supreme Court. Netanyahu met with the Noam faction leader and its sole MK Avi Maoz on 8 November after he threatened to boycott the coalition. He demanded complete control of the Western Wall by the Haredi rabbinate and removal of what he considered as anti-Zionist and anti-Jewish content in schoolbooks.

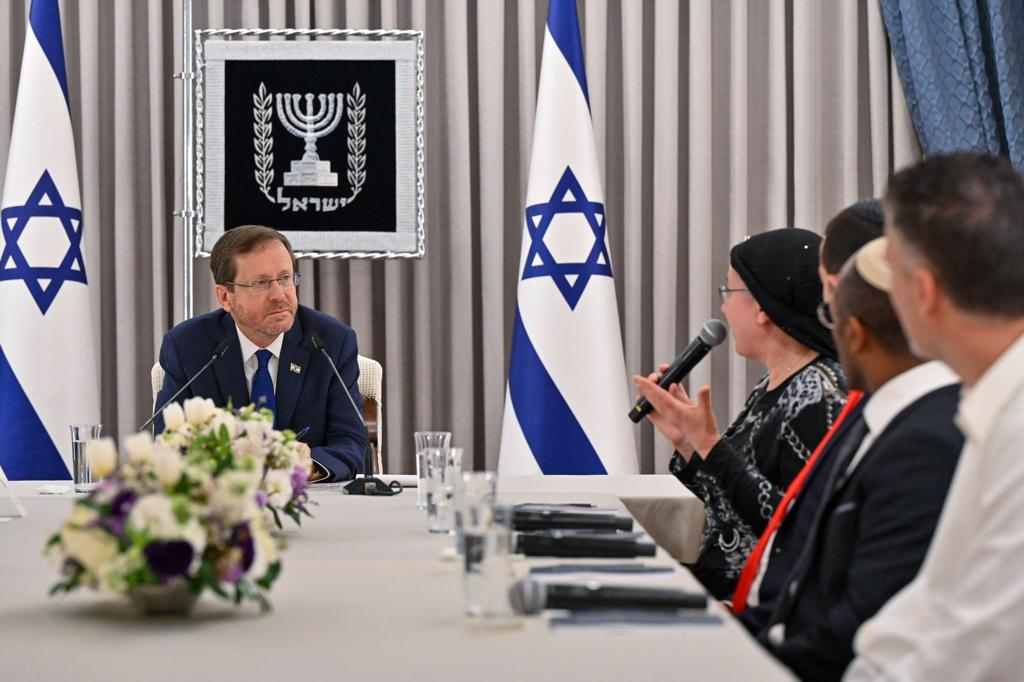
President Herzog consulting with MKs Orit Strook, Ohad Tal, and Moshe Solomon ahead of nominating a prime minister-designate, 10 November 2022.

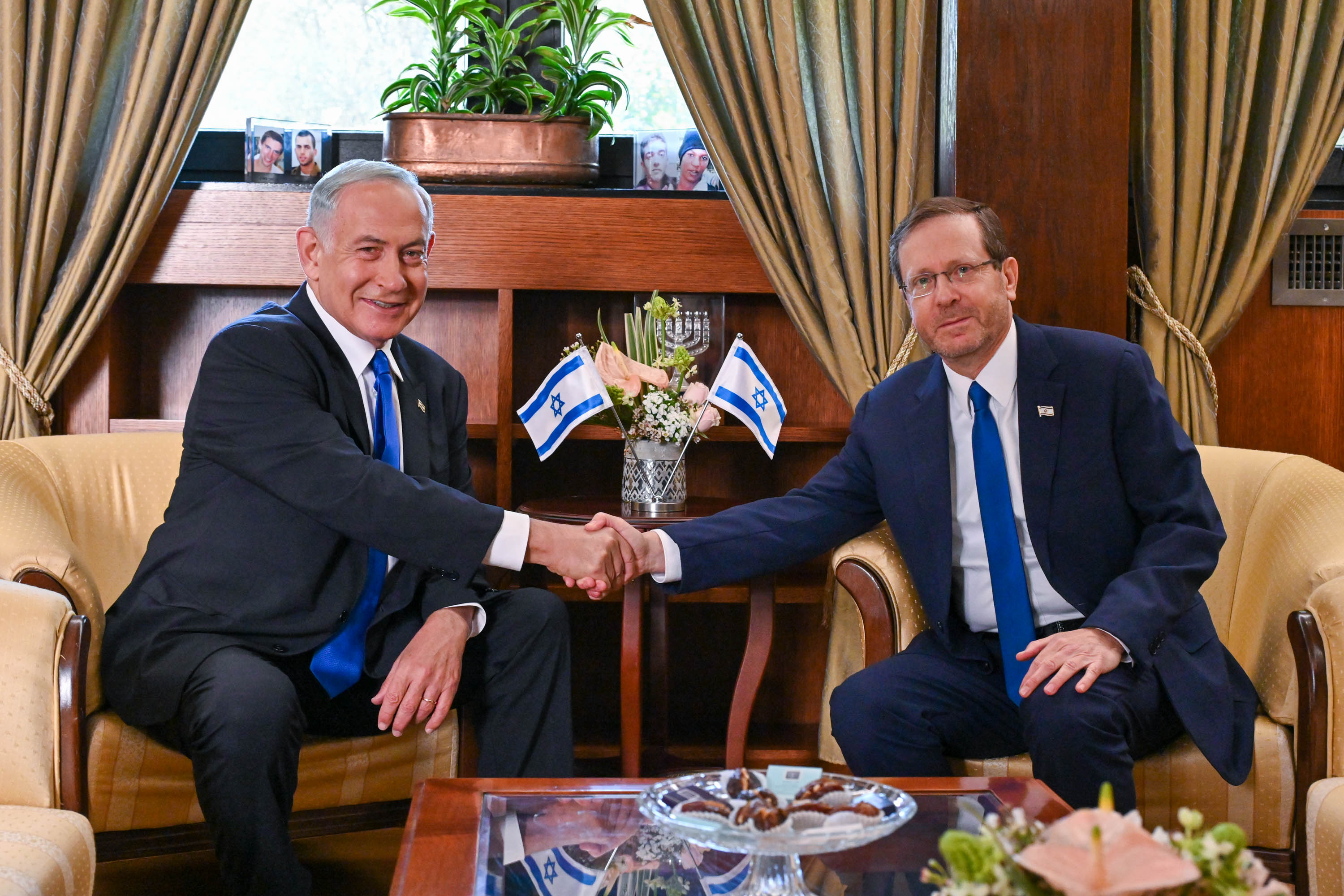
President Herzog assigns the task of forming a new government to Likud leader, Benjamin Netanyahu, 13 November 2022.

President Isaac Herzog began consultations with heads of all the political parties on 9 November after the election results were certified. During the consultations, he expressed his reservations about Ben-Gvir becoming a member in the next government. Shas met with Likud for coalition talks on 10 November. By 11 November, Netanyahu had secured recommendations from 64 MKs, which constituted a majority. He was given the mandate to form the thirty-seventh government of Israel by President Herzog on 13 November. Otzma Yehudit and Noam officially split from Religious Zionism on 20 November as per a pre-election agreement.

On 25 November, Otzma Yehudit and Likud signed a coalition agreement, under which Ben-Gvir will assume the newly created position of National Security Minister, whose powers would be more expansive than that of the Minister of Public Security, including overseeing the Israel Police and the Israel Border Police in the West Bank, as well as giving powers to authorities to shoot thieves stealing from military bases. Yitzhak Wasserlauf was given the Ministry for the Development of the Negev and the Galilee with expanded powers to regulate new West Bank settlements, while separating it from the "Periphery" portfolio, which will be given to Shas. The deal also includes giving the Ministry of Heritage to Amihai Eliyahu, separating it from the "Jerusalem Affairs" portfolio, the chairmanship of the Knesset's Public Security Committee to Zvika Fogel and that of the Special Committee for the Israeli Citizens' Fund to Limor Son Har-Melech, the post of Deputy Economic Minister to Almog Cohen, establishment of a national guard, and expansion of mobilization of reservists in the Border Police.

Netanyahu and Maoz signed a coalition agreement on 27 November, under which the latter would become a deputy minister, would head an agency on Jewish identity in the Prime Minister's Office, and would also head Nativ, which processes the aliyah from the former Soviet Union. The agency for Jewish identity would have authority over educational content taught outside the regular curriculum in schools, in addition to the department of the Ministry of Education overseeing external teaching and partnerships, which would bring nonofficial organisations permitted to teach and lecture at schools under its purview.

Likud signed a coalition agreement with the Religious Zionist Party on 1 December. Under the deal, Smotrich would serve as the Minister of Finance in rotation with Aryeh Deri, and the party will receive the post of a minister within the Ministry of Defense with control over the departments administering settlement and open lands under the Coordinator of Government Activities in the Territories, in addition to another post of a deputy minister. The deal also includes giving the post of Minister of Aliyah and Integration to Ofir Sofer, the newly created National Missions Ministry to Orit Strook, and the chairmanship of the Knesset's Constitution, Law and Justice Committee to Simcha Rothman.

Likud and United Torah Judaism signed a coalition agreement on 6 December, to allow request for an extension to the deadline. Under it, the party would receive the Ministry of Construction and Housing, the chairmanship of the Knesset Finance Committee which will be given to Moshe Gafni, the Ministry of Jerusalem and Tradition (which would replace the Ministry of Jerusalem Affairs and Heritage), in addition to several posts of deputy ministers and chairmanships of Knesset committees.

Likud also signed a deal with Shas by 8 December, securing interim coalition agreements with all of their allies. Under the deal, Deri will first serve as the Minister of Interior and Health, before rotating posts with Smotrich after two years. The party will also receive the Ministry of Religious Services and Welfare Ministries, as well as posts of deputy ministers in the Ministry of Education and Interior.

The vote to replace then-incumbent Knesset speaker Mickey Levy was scheduled for 13 December, after Likud and its allies secured the necessary number of signatures for it. Yariv Levin of Likud was elected as an interim speaker by 64 votes, while his opponents Merav Ben-Ari of Yesh Atid and Ayman Odeh of Hadash received 45 and five votes respectively.

Netanyahu asked Herzog for a 14-day extension after the agreement with Shas to finalise the roles his allied parties would play. Herzog on 9 December extended the deadline to 21 December. On that date, Netanyahu informed Herzog that he had succeeded in forming a coalition, with the new government expected to be sworn in by 2 January 2023. The government was sworn in on 29 December 2022.

== Timeline ==
=== Deri affair ===
Israeli law stated that people convicted of crimes cannot serve in the government. An amendment to that law was made in late 2022, known colloquially as the Deri Law, to allow those who had been convicted without prison time to serve. This allowed Deri to be appointed to the cabinet.

Shas leader Aryeh Deri was appointed to be Minister of Health, Minister of the Interior, and Vice Prime Minister in December 2022. He was fired in January 2023, following a Supreme Court decision that his appointment was unreasonable, since he had been convicted of fraud, and had promised not to seek government roles through a plea deal.

=== Judicial reform dismissal and resignation threats ===
In March 2023, Defence Minister Yoav Gallant called on the government to delay legislation related to the judicial reform. Prime Minister Netanyahu announced that he had been dismissed from his position, leading to the continuation of mass protests across the country (which had started in January in Tel Aviv). Gallant continued to serve as a minister as he had not received formal notice of dismissal, and two weeks later it was announced that Netanyahu had reversed his decision.

Public Safety Minister Itamar Ben-Gvir (Otzma Yehudit leader) and Minister of Justice Yariv Levin (Likud) both threatened to resign if the judicial reform was delayed.

=== War, unity government, resignations and rejoining ===
After the outbreak of the Gaza war, five members of the National Unity party joined the government as ministers without portfolio, with leader Benny Gantz being made a member of the new Israeli war cabinet (along with Netanyahu and Gallant).

As the war progressed, minister of national security Itamar Ben-Gvir in November 2023 threatened to leave the government if the war was ended. In mid-December, he again threatened to leave if the war did not maintain "full strength".

Gideon Sa'ar stated on 16 March 2024 that his New Hope party would resign from the government and join the opposition if Prime Minister Benjamin Netanyahu did not appoint him to the Israeli war cabinet. Netanyahu did not do so, resulting in Sa'ar's New Hope party leaving the government nine days later, reducing the size of the coalition from 76 MKs to 72.

Ben-Gvir and Bezalel Smotrich, of the Religious Zionist Party, indicated that they would withdraw their parties from the government if a ceasefire in Gaza were adopted; this would have brought down the government. Ben-Gvir announced on 5 June that the members of his party would be allowed to vote as they wish, though his party resumed support on 9 June.

On 18 May, Gantz set an 8 June deadline for withdrawal from the coalition, which was delayed by a day following the 2024 Nuseirat rescue operation. Gantz and his party left the government on 9 June, giving the government 64 seats in the Knesset.

Sa'ar and his New Hope party rejoined the Netanyahu government on 30 September, increasing the number of seats held by the government to 68.

=== Ultra-Orthodox draft ===
The High Court of Justice ruled on 28 March 2024 that yeshiva funds would no longer be available for students who are "eligible for enlistment", effectively allowing ultra-Orthodox Jews to be drafted into the IDF. Attorney general Gali Baharav-Miara indicated on 31 March that the conscription process must begin on 1 April. The court ruled on 25 June that the IDF must begin to draft yeshiva students.

Likud announced on 7 July that it would not put forward any legislation after Shas and United Torah Judaism said that they would boycott the plenary session over the lack of legislation dealing with the Haredi draft. The Ultra-Orthodox boycott continued for a second day, with UTJ briefly ending its boycott on 9 July to unsuccessfully vote in favor of a bill which would have weakened the Law of Return.

Yuli Edelstein, who was replaced by Boaz Bismuth on the Foreign Affairs and Defense Committee in early August, published a draft version of the conscription law shortly before his ouster. Bismuth cancelled the work on the draft law in September 2025, which Edelstein called "a shame." Bismuth released the official version of the draft law in late November 2025. It weakened penalties for draft evaders, with Edelstein saying it was "the exact opposite" of the bill which he attempted to pass.

Netanyahu and Smotrich announced in March 2026 that the bill was set aside after the beginning of the 2026 Iran war, to allow for the passage of the budget. Nonetheless, Netanyahu announced in May 2026 that he intended to bring back the bill, with the Knesset's Foreign Affairs and Defense Committee expected to take up the bill on 20 May.

=== Otzma Yehudit and Noam resignations ===
Members of Otzma Yehudit resigned from the government on 19 January 2025 over the January 2025 Gaza war ceasefire, which took effect on 21 January. The members rejoined in March, following the "resumption" of the war in Gaza.

Avi Maoz of the Noam party left the government in March 2025.

=== Failed attempt to dissolve Knesset ===
On 4 June 2025, senior rabbis for United Torah Judaism Dov Lando and Moshe Hillel Hirsch instructed the party's MKs to pass a bill which would dissolve the Knesset. Yesh Atid, Yisrael Beytenu and The Democrats announced that they will "submit a bill" for dissolution on 11 June, with Yesh Atid tabling the bill on 4 June. There were also reports that Shas would vote in favor of Knesset dissolution amidst division within the governing coalition on Haredi conscription. This jeopardized the coalition's majority and would have triggered new elections if the bill passed. The following day, Agudat Yisrael, one of the United Torah Judaism factions, confirmed that it would submit a bill to dissolve the Knesset. Asher Medina, a Shas spokesman, indicated on 9 June that the party would vote in favor of a preliminary bill to dissolve the Knesset.

The rabbis of Degel HaTorah instructed the parties' MKs on 12 June 2025 to oppose the dissolution of the Knesset, which was followed by Yuli Edelstein and the Shas and Degel HaTorah parties announcing that a deal had been reached, with "rabbinical leaders" telling their parties to delay the dissolution vote by a week. Shas and Degel HaTorah voted against the dissolution bill, which led to the bill failing its preliminary reading in a vote of 61 against and 53 in favor. MKs Ya'akov Tessler and Moshe Roth of Agudat Yisrael voted in favor of dissolution. Another dissolution bill will be unable to be brought forward for six months.

If the bill had passed its preliminary reading, in addition to three more readings, an election would have been held in approximately three months; The Jerusalem Post posited it would have been held in October.

=== United Torah Judaism resignations ===
Degel HaTorah announced on 14 July 2025 that it would leave the government because members of the party were dissatisfied after viewing the proposed draft bill by Yuli Edelstein regarding Haredi exemptions from the Israeli draft. Several hours later, Agudat Yisrael announced that it would also leave the government. Deputy Transportation Minister Uri Maklev, Moshe Gafni, the head of the Knesset Finance Committee, Ya'akov Asher, the head of the Knesset Interior and Environment Protection Committee and Jerusalem Affairs minister Meir Porush all submitted their resignations, with their resignations taking effect in 48 hours. Sports Minister Ya'akov Tessler and "Special Committee for Public Petitions Chair" Yitzhak Pindrus also submitted resignations. Yisrael Eichler submitted his resignation as the "head of the Knesset Labor and Welfare Committee" the same day.

The resignations will leave Netanyahu's government with a 60-seat majority in the Knesset, as Avi Maoz, of the Noam party, left the government in March 2025.

Despite Edelstein's ouster in August, a spokesman for UTJ head Yitzhak Goldknopf remarked that it would not change the faction's withdrawal from the government.

=== Shas resignations ===
The religious council for Shas, called the Moetzet Chachmei HaTorah, instructed the party on 16 July to leave the government, but stay in the coalition. The following day, various cabinet ministers submitted their resignations, including "Interior Minister Moshe Arbel, Social Affairs Minister Ya'akov Margi and Religious Services Minister Michael Malchieli." Malchieli reportedly has postponed his resignation so he could attend a 20 July meeting of the panel investigating whether attorney general Gali Baharav-Miara should be dismissed.

Deputy Minister of Agriculture Moshe Abutbul, Minister of Health Uriel Buso and Haim Biton, a minister in the Education Ministry, also submitted their resignation letters, while Arbel retracted his resignation letter. The last cabinet member from the party to submit it was Labor Minister Yoav Ben-Tzur.

The ministers who resigned will return to the Knesset, replacing MKs Moshe Roth, Yitzhak Pindrus and Eliyahu Baruchi.

=== Legislative blitz and Knesset dissolution ===
On 20 May 2026, amidst continued deadlock within the coalition over a Haredi conscription bill, the Knesset passed the preliminary reading of a bill by 110–0 to dissolve itself and bring the 2026 election forward by a month.

The Knesset's legal advisor, Sagit Afik, announced in early July that the Knesset will dissolve on 17 July and the next election will be held on 27 October.

The government sought to pass a variety of bills, known as the "legislative blitz", before the planned dissolution of the Knesset. The Knesset dissolved on 17 July, with the government successfully securing the passage of numerous laws, including a media reform bill, a bill which ended the arrests of draft dodgers and a bill weakening the power of the attorney general. The High Court of Justice ruled on 28 July that it would put the implementation of the draft enforcement law, which limited arrests, on hold, following a hearing that was held that same day before nine of the judges.

== Members of government ==
=== Parties ===
| Date | Likud | New Hope | National Unity | RZP | Otzma | UTJ | Shas | Noam | Total seats | Status |
|---|---|---|---|---|---|---|---|---|---|---|
| 29 December 2022 | Yes | No | | Yes | Yes | Yes | Yes | Yes | 64 | Majority |
| 12 October 2023 | Yes | Yes | | Yes | Yes | Yes | Yes | Yes | 76 | Majority |
| 12 March 2024 | Yes | Yes | Yes | Yes | Yes | Yes | Yes | Yes | 76 | Majority |
| 25 March 2024 | Yes | No | Yes | Yes | Yes | Yes | Yes | Yes | 72 | Majority |
| 9 June 2024 | Yes | No | No | Yes | Yes | Yes | Yes | Yes | 64 | Majority |
| 29 September 2024 | Yes | Yes | No | Yes | Yes | Yes | Yes | Yes | 68 | Majority |
| 21 January 2025 | Yes | Yes | No | Yes | No | Yes | Yes | Yes | 62 | Majority |
| 19 March 2025 | Yes | Yes | No | Yes | Yes | Yes | Yes | Yes | 68 | Majority |
| 24 March 2025 | Yes | Yes | No | Yes | Yes | Yes | Yes | No | 67 | Majority |
| 15 July 2025 | Yes | Yes | No | Yes | Yes | No | Yes | No | 60 | Minority |
| 17 July 2025 | Yes | Yes | No | Yes | Yes | No | No | No | 49 | Minority |
| 13 August 2025 | Yes | | No | Yes | Yes | No | No | No | 49 | Minority |

=== Ministers ===
Listed below are the current ministers in the government:

| Portfolio | Minister | Party |
|---|---|---|
| Prime Minister | Benjamin Netanyahu | Likud |
| Deputy Prime Minister; Minister of Justice | Yariv Levin | Likud |
| Vice Prime Minister | Aryeh Deri (Dec. 2022–Jan. 2023) | Shas |
| Minister of the Interior | Aryeh Deri (Dec. 2022–Jan. 2023) | Shas |
| Minister of the Interior | Michael Malchieli (Jan. 2023–Apr. 2023) (acting) | Shas |
| Minister of the Interior | Moshe Arbel (Apr. 2023–July 2025) | Shas |
| Minister of the Interior | Benjamin Netanyahu (July 2025) | Likud |
| Minister of the Interior | Yariv Levin (July 2025–) | Likud |
| Minister of Health | Aryeh Deri (Dec. 2022–Jan. 2023) | Shas |
| Minister of Health | Yoav Ben-Tzur (Jan. 2023–Apr. 2023) (acting) | Shas |
| Minister of Health | Moshe Arbel (Apr. 2023–Oct. 2023) | Shas |
| Minister of Health | Uriel Buso (Oct. 2023–July 2025) | Shas |
| Minister of Health | Benjamin Netanyahu (July 2025) | Likud |
| Minister of Health | Haim Katz (July 2025–) | Likud |
| Minister for the Development of the Negev and the Galilee and National Resilience | Yitzhak Wasserlauf (Dec. 2022–Jan. 2025, Mar. 2025–) | Otzma Yehudit |
| Minister for the Development of the Negev and the Galilee and National Resilience | Haim Katz (Jan. 2025–Mar. 2025) (acting) | Likud |
| Minister of Diaspora Affairs | Amichai Chikli | Likud |
| Minister for Social Equality | Amichai Chikli (Dec. 2022–Jan. 2024) | Likud |
| Minister for Social Equality | May Golan (Jan. 2024–) | Likud |
| Minister for Women's Empowerment | May Golan (May 2023–) | Likud |
| Minister of Housing and Construction | Yitzhak Goldknopf (Dec. 2022–June 2025) | United Torah Judaism |
| Minister of Housing and Construction | Haim Katz (June 2025–) (acting) | Likud |
| Minister in the Prime Minister's Office | Yitzhak Goldknopf (Dec. 2022–Mar. 2025) | United Torah Judaism |
| Minister of Agriculture and Rural Development | Avi Dichter | Likud |
| Minister of Aliyah and Integration | Ofir Sofer | Religious Zionist Party |
| Minister of Communications | Shlomo Karhi | Likud |
| Minister of Culture and Sport | Miki Zohar | Likud |
| Minister of Defense | Yoav Gallant (Dec. 2022–Nov. 2024) | Likud |
| Minister of Defense | Israel Katz (Nov. 2024–) | Likud |
| Minister of Finance; Minister in the Defense Ministry | Bezalel Smotrich | Mafdal–Religious Zionism |
| Minister of the Economy | Nir Barkat | Likud |
| Minister of Education | Yoav Kisch | Likud |
| Minister of Regional Cooperation | Yoav Kisch (Dec. 2022–Mar. 2023) | Likud |
| Minister of Regional Cooperation | Dudi Amsalem (Mar. 2023–) | Likud |
| Minister in the Education Ministry | Haim Biton (Dec. 2022–July 2025) | Shas |
| Minister of Environmental Protection | Idit Silman | Likud |
| Minister of Foreign Affairs | Eli Cohen (Dec. 2022–Jan. 2024) | Likud |
| Minister of Foreign Affairs | Israel Katz (Jan. 2024–Nov. 2024) | Likud |
| Minister of Foreign Affairs | Gideon Sa'ar (Nov. 2024–) | New Hope |
| Ministry of Energy | Israel Katz (until Jan. 2024) | Likud |
| Ministry of Energy | Eli Cohen (Jan. 2024–) | Likud |
| Minister of Public Diplomacy | Galit Distel-Atbaryan (Jan. 2023–Oct. 2023) | Likud |
| Minister of Intelligence | Yariv Levin (Dec. 2022–Jan. 2023) | Likud |
| Minister of Intelligence | Gila Gamliel (Jan. 2023–Mar. 2024) | Likud |
| Minister of Heritage | Amihai Eliyahu (Dec. 2022–Jan. 2025, Mar. 2025–) | Otzma Yehudit |
| Minister of Heritage | Haim Katz (Jan. 2025–Mar. 2025) (acting) | Likud |
| Minister of Jerusalem Affairs and Jewish Tradition | Meir Porush (Jan. 2023–July 2025) | United Torah Judaism |
| Minister of Jerusalem Affairs and Jewish Tradition | Benjamin Netanyahu (July 2025) | Likud |
| Minister of Labor, Social Affairs, and Social Services | Ya'akov Margi (Dec. 2022–July 2025) | Shas |
| Minister of Labor, Social Affairs, and Social Services | Benjamin Netanyahu (July 2025) | Likud |
| Minister of Labor, Social Affairs, and Social Services | Yariv Levin (July 2025–) | Likud |
| Minister in the Ministry of Labor, Social Affairs, and Social Services | Yoav Ben-Tzur (Dec. 2022–July 2025) | Shas |
| Minister of Settlements and National Missions | Orit Strook | Mafdal–Religious Zionism |
| Minister of National Security | Itamar Ben-Gvir (Dec. 2022–Jan. 2025, Mar. 2025) | Otzma Yehudit |
| Minister of National Security | Haim Katz (Jan. 2025–Mar. 2025) (acting) | Likud |
| Minister of Religious Affairs | Michael Malchieli (Dec. 2022–July 2025) | Shas |
| Minister of Religious Affairs | Benjamin Netanyahu (July 2025) | Likud |
| Minister of Religious Affairs | Yariv Levin (July 2025–) | Likud |
| Minister of Science and Technology | Ofir Akunis (Dec. 2022–Mar. 2024) | Likud |
| Minister of Science and Technology | Gila Gamliel (Mar. 2024–) | Likud |
| Minister of Strategic Affairs | Ron Dermer (Feb. 2023–Nov. 2025) | Likud |
| Minister of Tourism | Haim Katz | Likud |
| Minister of Transportation | Miri Regev | Likud |
| Minister Without Portfolio in the Prime Minister's Office | May Golan (Jan. 2023–May 2023) | Likud |
| Minister without portfolio | Benny Gantz (Oct. 2023–Jun. 2024) | National Unity |
| Minister without portfolio | Gideon Sa'ar (Oct. 2023–Mar. 2024) (Sep. 2024–Nov. 2024) | National Unity; New Hope |
| Minister without portfolio | Gadi Eisenkot (Oct. 2023–Jun. 2024) | National Unity |
| Minister without portfolio | Hili Tropper (Oct. 2023–Jun. 2024) | National Unity |
| Minister without portfolio | Yifat Shasha-Biton (Oct. 2023–Mar. 2024) | National Unity; New Hope |

=== Deputy ministers ===
| Portfolio | Minister | Party | Reference |
|---|---|---|---|
| Deputy Minister of National Jewish Identity in the Prime Minister's office | Avi Maoz (Dec. 2022–Feb. 2023) (May 2023–Mar. 2025) | Noam | |
| Deputy Minister in the Prime Minister's office Deputy Minister of Transportation | Uri Maklev (Dec. 2022–July 2025) | United Torah Judaism | |
| Deputy Minister in the Prime Minister's office | Almog Cohen (since Apr. 2025) | Otzma Yehudit | |
| Deputy Minister of Agriculture and Rural Development | Moshe Abutbul (Dec. 2022–July 2025) | Shas | |
| Deputy Minister for Culture | Ya'akov Tessler (Dec. 2022–June 2025) | United Torah Judaism | |
| Deputy Minister of Finance | Michal Waldiger (Dec. 2022–Oct. 2023) | Mafdal–Religious Zionism | |
| Deputy Minister of Interior; Deputy Minister of Health | Moshe Arbel (Dec. 2022–Jan. 2023) | Shas | |

== Principles and priorities ==
According to the agreements signed between Likud and each of its coalition partners, and the incoming government's published guideline principles, its stated priorities are to combat the cost of living, further centralize Orthodox control over the state religious services, pass judicial reforms which include legislation to reduce judicial controls on executive and legislative power, expand settlements in the West Bank, and consider an annexation of the West Bank.

Before the vote of confidence in his new government in the Knesset, Netanyahu presented three top priorities for the new government: internal security and governance, halting the nuclear program of Iran, and the development of infrastructure, with a focus on further connecting the center of the country with its periphery.

== Policies ==
=== Judicial reforms ===
One of the government's flagship programs, known as the Judicial Reforms, centered around reforms in the judicial branch and drew widespread criticism. Critics said it would have negative effects on the separation of powers, the office of the Attorney General, the economy, public health, women and minorities, workers' rights, scientific research, the overall strength of Israel's democracy and its foreign relations.

After weeks of public protests on Israel's streets, joined by a growing number of military reservists, Minister of Defense Yoav Gallant spoke against the reform on 25 March, calling for a halt of the legislative process "for the sake of Israel's security". The next day, Netanyahu announced that he would be removed from his post, sparking another wave of protest across Israel and ultimately leading to Netanyahu agreeing to pause the legislation. On 10 April, Netanyahu announced that Gallant would keep his post.

On 27 March 2023, after the public protests and general strikes, Netanyahu announced a pause in the reform process to allow for dialogue with opposition parties. However, negotiations aimed at reaching a compromise collapsed in June, and the government resumed its plans to unilaterally pass parts of the legislation. On 24 July 2023, the Knesset passed a bill that curbs the power of the Supreme Court to declare government decisions unreasonable; on 1 January 2024, the Supreme Court struck the bill down.

The Knesset passed a "watered-down" version of the judicial reform package in late March 2025 which "changes the composition" of the judicial selection committee and is only set to come into effect following the swearing-in of the subsequent Knesset.

=== Security ===
==== Independence of the Israel Police ====
In December 2022 Minister of National Security Itamar Ben-Gvir sought to amend the law that regulates the operations of the Israel Police, such that the ministry will have more direct control of its forces and policies, including its investigative priorities. Attorney General Gali Baharav-Miara objected to the draft proposal, raising concerns that the law would enable the politicization of police work, and the draft was amended to partially address those concerns. Nevertheless, in March 2023 Deputy Attorney General Gil Limon stated that the Attorney General's fears had been realized, referring to several instances of ministerial involvement in the day-to-day work of the otherwise independent police force – statements that were repeated by the Attorney General herself two days later. Separately, Police Commissioner Kobi Shabtai instructed Deputy Commissioners to avoid direct communication with the minister, later stating that "the Israel Police will remain apolitical, and act only according to law".

Following appeals by the Association for Civil Rights in Israel and the Movement for Quality Government in Israel, the High Court of Justice instructed Ben-Gvir "to refrain from giving operational directions to the police... [especially] as regards to protests and demonstrations against the government."

==== Creation of a National Guard ====
As talks of halting the judicial reform gained wind during March 2023, Minister of National Security Itamar Ben-Gvir threatened to resign if the legislation implementing the changes was suspended. To appease Ben-Gvir, Prime Minister Netanyahu announced that the government would promote the creation of a new National Guard of Israel, to be headed by Ben-Gvir.

On 29 March, thousands of Israelis demonstrated in Tel Aviv, Haifa and Jerusalem against this decision.

On 1 April, the New York Times quoted Gadeer Nicola, head of the Arab department at the Association for Civil Rights in Israel, as saying "If this thing passes, it will be an imminent danger to the rights of Arab citizens in this country. This will create two separate systems of applying the law. The regular police which will operate against Jewish citizens — and a militarized militia to deal only with Arab citizens." The same day, while speaking on Israel's Channel 13 about those whom he'd like to see enlist in the National Guard, Ben-Gvir specifically mentioned La Familia, the far-right fan club of the Beitar Jerusalem soccer team.

On 2 April, Israel's cabinet approved the establishment of a law enforcement body that would operate independently of the police, under Ben-Gvir's authority. According to the decision, the Minister was to establish a committee chaired by the Director General of the Ministry of National Security, with representatives of the ministries of defense, justice and finance, as well as the police and the IDF, to outline the operations of the new organization. The committee's recommendations will be submitted to the government for consideration.

Addressing a conference on 4 April, Police Commissioner Kobi Shabtai said that he is not opposed to the establishment of a security body which would answer to the police, but "a separate body? Absolutely not." The police chief said he had warned Ben-Gvir that the establishment of a security body separate from the police is "unnecessary, with extremely high costs that may harm citizens' personal security."

During a press conference on 10 April, Prime Minister Netanyahu said, in what has been seen by some news outlets as a concession to the protesters, that "This will not be anyone's militia, it will be a security body, orderly, professional, that will be subordinate to one of the [existing] security bodies."

The committee established by the government recommended the government to order the establishment of the National Guard immediately while allocating budgets. The National Guard, under whose command will be a superintendent of the police, will not be subordinate to Ben-Gvir. It will be subordinate to the police commissioner and will be part of Israel Border Police. The Ministry of Defense and Finance opposed the conclusions. The Israeli National Security Council called for further discussion on this.

=== Religion, nationhood, and gender ===
The coalition's efforts to expand the purview of Rabbinical courts; force some organizations, such as hospitals, to enforce certain religious practices; amend the Law Prohibiting Discrimination to allow gender segregation and discrimination on the grounds of religious belief; expand funding for religious causes; and put into law the exemption of yeshiva and kollel students from conscription have drawn criticism.

According to the Haaretz op-ed of 7 March 2023, "the current coalition is interested... in modifying the public space so it suits the religious lifestyle. The legal coup is meant to castrate anyone who can prevent it, most of all the HCJ."

==== Torah study ====
The House Committee voted on 30 June 2026 in favor of Basic Law: Torah Study which would enshrine the value of Torah study in the state. The bill passed its first reading on 2 July and passed its final readings by a vote of 63-52 on 13 July.

==== Women's rights ====
Several banks and institutional investors, including the Israel Discount Bank and AIG have committed to avoid investing in, or providing credit to any organization that will discriminate against others on ground of religion, race, gender or sexual orientation.

A series of technology companies and investment firms including Wiz, Intel Israel, Salesforce and Microsoft Israel Research and Development, have criticized the proposed changes to the Law Prohibiting Discrimination, with Wiz stating that it will require its suppliers to commit to preventing discrimination.

Over sixty prominent law firms pledged that they will neither represent, nor do business with discriminating individuals and organizations.

Insight Partners, a major private equity fund operating in Israel, released a statement warning against intolerance and any attempt to harm personal liberties.

Orit Lahav, chief executive of the women's rights organization Mavoi Satum ("Dead End"), said that "the Rabbinical courts are the most discriminatory institution in the State of Israel... Limiting the HCJ (Note: The High Court of Justice, a session of the Supreme Court that decides on matters regarding the legality of decisions of State authorities.) while expanding the jurisdiction of the Rabbinical courts would... cause significant harm to women."

Anat Thon Ashkenazy, Director of the Center for Democratic Values and Institutions at the Israel Democracy Institute, said that "almost every part of the reform could harm women... the meaning of an override clause is that even if the court says that the law on gender segregation is illegitimate, is harmful, the Knesset could say 'Okay, we say otherwise'". She added that "there is a very broad institutional framework here, after which there will come legislation that harms women's right and we will have no way of protecting or stopping it."

During July 2023, 20 professional medical associations signed a letter of position warning against the ramifications to public health that would result from the exclusion of women from the public sphere. They cited, among others, a rise in prevalence of risk factors for cardiovascular disease, pregnancy-related ailments, psychological distress, and the risk of suicide.

===== Sexual assault on grounds of nationality =====
On 30 July the Knesset passed an amendment to penal law adding sexual offenses to those offenses whose penalty can be doubled if done on grounds of "nationalistic terrorism, racism or hostility towards a certain community". According to MK Limor Son Har-Melech, the bill is meant to penalize any individual who "[intends to] harm a woman sexually based on her Jewishness". The law was criticized by MK Gilad Kariv as "populist, nationalistic, and dangerous towards the Arab citizens of Israel", and by MK Ahmad Tibi as a "race law", and was objected to by legal advisors at the Ministry of Justice and the Knesset Committee on National Security.

Activist Orit Kamir wrote that "the amendment... is neither feminist, equal, nor progressive, but the opposite: it subordinates women's sexuality to the nationalistic, racist patriarchy. It hijacks the Law for Prevention of Sexual Harassment to serve a world view that tags women as sexual objects that personify the nation's honor." Yael Sherer, director of the Lobby to Combat Sexual Violence, criticized the law as being informed by dated ideas about sexual assault, and proposed that MKs "dedicate a session... to give victims of sexual assault an opportunity to come out of the darkness... instead of [submitting] declarative bills that change nothing and are not meant but for grabbing headlines".

===== Electronic tagging of domestic violence offenders =====
In Israel, during 2022, 24 women "were murdered because they were women," which was an increase of 50% compared to 2021. A law permitting courts to order men subject to a restraining order following domestic violence offenses to wear electronic tags was drafted during the previous Knesset and had passed its first reading unanimously.

On 22 March 2023, the Knesset voted to reject the bill. It had been urged to do so by National Security Minister Itamar Ben-Gvir, who said that the bill was unfair to men. Earlier in the week, Ben-Gvir had blocked the measure from advancing in the ministerial legislative committee. The MKs voting against the bill included Prime Minister Netanyahu.

The Association of Families of Murder Victims said that by rejecting the law, National Security Minister Itamar Ben-Gvir "brings joy to violent men and abandons the women threatened with murder… unsupervised restraining orders endanger women's lives even more. They give women the illusion of being protected, and then they are murdered." MK Pnina Tamano-Shata, chairwoman of the Knesset Committee on the Status of Women and Gender Equality, said that "the coalition proved today that it despises women's lives."

The NGO Amutat Bat Melech, which assists Orthodox and ultra-Orthodox women who suffer from domestic violence, said that: "Rejecting the electronic bracelet bill is disconnected from the terrible reality of seven femicides since the beginning of the year. This is an effective tool of the first degree that could have saved lives and reduced the threat to women suffering from domestic violence. This is a matter of life and death, whose whole purpose is to provide a solution to defend women."

==== The Law of Return ====
The agreement signed by the coalition parties includes the setting up of a committee to draft changes to the Law of Return. Israeli religious parties have long demanded that the "grandchild clause" of the Law of Return be cancelled. This clause grants citizenship to anyone with at least one Jewish grandparent, as long as they do not practice another religion. If the grandchild clause were to be removed from the Law of Return then around 3 million people who are currently eligible for aliyah would no longer be eligible.

The heads of the Jewish Agency, the Jewish Federations of North America, the World Zionist Organization and Keren Hayesod sent a joint letter to Prime Minister Netanyahu, expressing their "deep concern" about any changes to the Law of Return, adding that "Any change in the delicate and sensitive status quo on issues such as the Law of Return or conversion could threaten to unravel the ties between us and keep us away from each other."

The Executive Council of Australian Jewry and the Zionist Federation of Australia issued a joint statement saying "We… view with deep concern… proposals in relation to religious pluralism and the law of return that risk damaging Israel's… relationship with Diaspora Jewry."

=== International relations ===
==== Identity denial and map controversy ====
On 19 March 2023, Israeli Finance Minister Bezalel Smotrich spoke in Paris at a memorial service for a Likud activist. The lectern at which Smotrich spoke was covered with a flag depicting the 'Greater Land of Israel,' encompassing the whole of Mandatory Palestine, as well as Trans-Jordan.

During his speech, Smotrich said that "there's no such thing as Palestinians because there's no such thing as a Palestinian people." He added that the Palestinian people are a fictitious nation invented only to fight the Zionist movement, asking "Is there a Palestinian history or culture? There isn't any."

The event received widespread media coverage.

On 21 March, a spokesman for the US State Department sharply criticized Smotrich's comments. "The comments, which were delivered at a podium adorned with an inaccurate and provocative map, are offensive, they are deeply concerning, and, candidly, they're dangerous. The Palestinians have a rich history and culture, and the United States greatly values our partnership with the Palestinian people," he said.

The Jordanian Foreign Ministry also voiced disapproval: "The Israeli Minister of Finance's use, during his participation in an event held yesterday in Paris, of a map of Israel that includes the borders of the Hashemite Kingdom of Jordan and the occupied Palestinian territories represents a reckless inflammatory act, and a violation of international norms and the Jordanian-Israeli peace treaty." Additionally, a map encompassing Mandatory Palestine and Trans-Jordan with a Jordanian flag on it was placed on a central lectern in the Jordanian Parliament. Jordan's parliament voted to expel the Israeli ambassador.

Israel's Ministry of Foreign Affairs released a clarification relating to the matter, stating that "Israel is committed to the 1994 peace agreement with Jordan. There has been no change in the position of the State of Israel, which recognizes the territorial integrity of the Hashemite Kingdom of Jordan".

==== European Union ====
Ahead of a Europe Day event due to take place on 9 May 2023, far-right wing National Security Minister Itamar Ben-Gvir was assigned as a representative of the government and a speaker at the event by the government secretariat, which deals with placing ministers at receptions on the occasion of the national days of the foreign embassies. The European Union requested that Ben-Gvir not attend, but the government did not make changes to the plan. On 8 May, the European delegation to Israel cancelled the reception, stating that: "The EU Delegation to Israel is looking forward to celebrating Europe Day on May 9, as it does every year. Regrettably, this year we have decided to cancel the diplomatic reception, as we do not want to offer a platform to someone whose views contradict the values the European Union stands for. However, the Europe Day cultural event for the Israeli public will be maintained to celebrate with our friends and partners in Israel the strong and constructive bilateral relationship".

Israel's Opposition Leader Yair Lapid stated: "Sending Itamar Ben-Gvir to a gathering of EU ambassadors is a serious professional mistake. The government is embarrassing a large group of friendly countries, jeopardizing future votes in international institutions, and damaging our foreign relations. Last year, after a decade of efforts, we succeeded in signing an economic-political agreement with the European Union that will contribute to the Israeli economy and our foreign relations. Why risk it, and for what? Ben-Gvir is not a legitimate person in the international community (and not really in Israel either), and sometimes you have to be both wise and just and simply send someone else".

=== Israeli-Palestinian relations ===
==== Transfer of the West Bank to Israeli civilian control ====
On 23 February 2023, Defense Minister Gallant signed an agreement assigning governmental powers in the West Bank to a body to be headed by Minister Bezalel Smotrich, who will effectively become the governor of the West Bank, controlling almost all areas of life in the area, including planning, building and infrastructure. Israeli governments have hitherto been careful to keep the occupation as a military government. The temporary holding of power by an occupying military force, pending a negotiated settlement, is a principle of international law – an expression of the prohibition against obtaining sovereignty through conquest that was introduced in the wake of World War II.

===== Legal concerns =====
An editorial in Haaretz noted that the assignment of governmental powers in the West Bank to a civilian governor, alongside the plan to expand the dual justice system so that Israeli law will apply fully to settlers in the West Bank, constitutes de jure annexation of the West Bank.

==== Response to Huwara rampage ====
On 26 February 2023, following the 2023 Huwara shooting in which two Israelis were killed by an unidentified attacker, hundreds of Israeli settlers attacked the Palestinian town of Huwara and three nearby villages, setting alight hundreds of Palestinian homes (some with people in them), businesses, a school, and numerous vehicles, killing one Palestinian man and injuring 100 others. Bezalel Smotrich subsequently called on Twitter for Huwara to be "wiped out" by the Israeli government. Zvika Fogel MK, of the ultra-nationalist Otzma Yehudit, which forms part of the governing coalition, said that he "looks very favorably upon" the results of the rampage.

==== Resettlement of settlements evacuated in 2005 ====
Members of the coalition proposed an amendment to the Disengagement Law, which would allow Israelis to resettle settlements vacated during the 2005 Israeli disengagement from Gaza and the northern West Bank. The evacuated settlements were considered illegal under international law, according to most countries. The proposal was approved for voting by the Foreign Affairs and Defense Committee on 9 March 2023, while the committee was still waiting for briefing materials from the NSS, IDF, MFA and Shin Bet, and was passed on 21 March. The US has requested clarification from Israeli ambassador Michael Herzog. A US State Department spokesman stated that "The U.S. strongly urges Israel to refrain from allowing the return of settlers to the area covered by the legislation, consistent with both former Prime Minister Sharon and the current Israeli Government's commitment to the United States," noting that the actions represent a clear violation of undertakings given by the Sharon government to the Bush administration in 2005 and Netanyahu's far-right coalition to the Biden administration the previous week.

=== Administration of governmental data, media and archives ===
==== Public broadcasting budget cuts ====
Minister of Communication Shlomo Karhi had initially intended to cut the funding of the Israeli Public Broadcasting Corporation (also known by its blanket branding Kan) by 400 million shekels – roughly half of its total budget – closing several departments, and privatizing content creation.

In response, the Director-General of the European Broadcasting Union, Noel Curran, sent two urgent letters to Netanyahu, expressing his concerns and calling on the Israeli government to "safeguard the independence of our Member KAN and ensure it is allowed to operate in a sustainable way, with funding that is both stable, adequate, fair, and transparent."

On 25 January 2023, nine journalist organizations representing some of Kan's competitors issued a statement of concern, acknowledging the "important contribution of public broadcasting in creating a worthy, unbiased and non-prejudicial journalistic platform", and noting that "the existence of the [broadcasting] corporation as a substantial public broadcast organization strengthens media as a whole, adding to the competition in the market rather than weakening it." They also expressed their concern that the "real reason" for the proposal was actually "an attempt to silence voices from which... [the Minister] doesn't always draw satisfaction". The same day, hundreds of journalists, actors and filmmakers protested in Tel Aviv. The proposal was eventually put on hold.

==== Deputy National Statistician nominees ====
On 22 February 2023 it was reported that Prime Minister Netanyahu was attempting to appoint his close associate Yossi Shelley as the deputy to the National Statistician — a highly sensitive position in charge of providing accurate data for decision makers. The appointment of Shelley, who did not possess the required qualifications for the role, was withdrawn following publication. In its daily editorial, Haaretz tied this attempt with the judicial reform: "once they take control of the judiciary, law enforcement and public media, they wish to control the state's data base, the dry numerical data it uses to plan its future". Netanyahu also proposed Avi Simhon for the role, and eventually froze all appointments at the Israel Central Bureau of Statistics.

==== Changes to the National Library of Israel's board of directors ====
Also on 22 February 2023, it was revealed that Yoav Kish, the Minister of Education, was promoting a draft government decision change to the National Library of Israel board of directors which would grant him more power over the institution. In response, the Hebrew University — which owned the library until 2008 – announced that if the draft is accepted, it will withdraw its collections from the library. The university's collections, which according to the university constitute some 80% of the library's collection, include the Agnon archive, the original manuscript of Hatikvah, and the Rothschild Haggadah, the oldest known Haggadah.

A group of 300 authors and poets signed an open letter against the move, further noting their objection against "political takeover" of public broadcasting, as well as "any legislation that will castrate the judiciary and damage the democratic foundations of the state of Israel". Several days later, it was reported that a series of donors decided to withhold their donations to the library, totaling some 80 million shekels.

On 3 March a petition against the move by 1,500 academics, including Israel Prize laureates, was sent to Kish.

The proposal has been seen by some as retribution against Shai Nitzan, the former State Attorney and the library's current rector.

On 5 March it was reported that the Legal Advisor to the Ministry of Finance, Asi Messing, was withholding the proposal. According to Messing, the proposal – which was being promoted as part of the Economic Arrangements Law – "was not reviewed... by the qualified personnel in the Ministry of Finance, does not align with any of the common goals of the economic plan, was not agreed to by myself and was not approved by the Attorney General."

=== Environmental protection ===
As of February 2023, the government has been debating several proposals that will significantly weaken the Ministry of Environmental Protection, including reducing the environmental regulation of planning and development and electricity production. One of the main proposals, the transferal of a 3 billion shekel fund meant to finance waste management plants from the Ministry of Environmental Protection to the Ministry of the Interior, was eventually withdrawn.

The Minister of Environmental Protection, Idit Silman, has been criticized for using for meeting with climate change denialists, for wasteful and personally-motivated travel on the ministry's expense, for politicizing the role, and for engaging in political activity on the ministry's time.

=== Public service ===
The government has been noted for an unusually high number of dismissals and resignations of senior career civil servants, and for the frequent attempts to replace them with candidates with known political associations, who are often less competent. According to sources, Netanyahu and people in his vicinity are seeking out civil servants who were appointed by the previous government, intent on replacing them with people loyal to him.

Governmental nominees for various positions have been criticized for lack of expertise. In addition to the nominee to the position of Deputy National Statistician (see above), the Director General of the Ministry of Finance, Shlomi Heisler; the Director General of the Ministry of Justice, Itamar Donenfeld; and the Director General of Ministry of Transport, Moshe Ben Zaken, have all been criticized for incompetence, lack of familiarity with their Ministries' subject matter, lack of interest in the job, or lack of experience in managing large organizations.

It has been reported that in some ministries, senior officials were enacting slowdowns as a means for dealing with the new ministers and director generals.

On 28 July the director general of the Ministry of Education resigned, citing as reason the societal "rift". Asaf Zalel, a retired Air Force Brigadier General, was appointed in January.

When asked about attempts to appoint his personal friend and attorney to the board of directors of a state-owned company, Minister Dudi Amsalem replied: "that is my job, due to my authority to appoint directors. I put forward people that I know and hold in esteem".

==== Ministry of Transport ====
Under Minister of Transport Miri Regev, the ministry has either dismissed or lost the heads of the National Public Transport Authority, Israel Airports Authority, National Road Safety Authority, Israel Railways, and several officials in Netivei Israel. The current chair of Netivei Israel is Likud member and Regev associate Yigal Amadi, and the legal counsel is Einav Abuhzira, daughter of a former Likud branch chair. Abuhzira was appointed instead of Elad Berdugo, nephew of Netanyahu surrogate Yaakov Bardugo, after he was disqualified for the role by the Israel Government Companies Authority.

==== Israel Postal Company ====
In July 2023 the Ministry of Communications, Shlomo Karhi, and the minister in charge of the Israel Government Companies Authority, Dudi Amsalem, deposed the chair of the Israel Postal Company, Michael Vaknin. The chair, who was hired to lead the company's financial recovery after years of operational loss and towards privatization, has gained the support of officials at the Authority and at the Ministry of Finance; nevertheless, the ministers claimed that his performance is inadequate, and nominated in his place Yiftah Ron-Tal, who has known ties to Netanyahu and Smotrich. They also nominated four new directors, two of which have known political associations, and a third who was a witness in Netanyahu's trial.

=== Use of discretionary spending ===
The coalition is allowed to spend a portion of the state's budget on a discretionary basis, meant to coax member parties to reach an agreement on the budget. As of May 2023, the government was pushing an allocation of over 13 billion shekels over two years - almost seven times the amount allocated by the previous government. Most of the funds will be allocated for uses associated with the religious, orthodox and settler communities. The head of the Budget Department at the Ministry of Finance, Yoav Gardos, objected to the allocations, claiming they would exacerbate unemployment in the Orthodox community, which is projected to cost the economy a total of 6.7 trillion shekels in lost produce by 2065.

At the onset of the Gaza war and the declaration of a state of national emergency, Minister of Finance Bezalel Smotrich instructed government agencies to continue with the planned distribution of discretionary funds.

== Corruption ==
=== Donations to elected officials ===
During March 2023, the government was promoting an amendment to the Law on Public Service (Gifts) that would allow Netanyahu to receive donations to fund his legal defense. The amendment follows a decision by the High Court of Justice (HCJ) that forced Netanyahu to refund US$270,000 given to him and his wife by his late cousin, Nathan Mileikowsky, for their legal defense. This is in contrast to past statements by Minister of Justice Yariv Levin, who spoke against the possible conflict of interests that can result from such transactions.

The bill was opposed by the Attorney General Gali Baharav-Miara, who stressed that it could "create a real opportunity for governmental corruption", and was eventually withdrawn at the end of March.

=== Appointment of convicted criminals to ministerial positions ===
As of March 2023, the coalition was promoting a bill that would prevent judicial review of ministerial appointments. The bill is intended to prevent the HCJ from reviewing the appointment of the twice-convicted chairman of Shas, Aryeh Deri (convicted of bribery, fraud, and breach of trust), to a ministerial position, after his previous appointment was annulled on grounds of unreasonableness. The bill follows on the heels of another amendment, that relaxed the ban on the appointment of convicted criminals, so that Deri - who was handed a suspended sentence after his second conviction - could be appointed.

The bill is opposed by the Attorney General, as well as by the Knesset Legal Adviser, Sagit Afik.

=== Prime Minister's capacity to serve ===
Israeli law allows for declaring a Prime Minister (as well as several other high-ranking public officials) to be temporarily or permanently incapacitated, but does not specify the conditions which can lead to a declaration of incapacitation. In the case of the Prime Minister, the authority to do so is given to the Attorney General. In March 2023, the coalition advanced a bill that passes this authority from the Attorney General to the government with the approval of the Knesset committee, and clarified that incapacitation can only result from medical or mental conditions. On 3 January 2024, the Supreme Court ruled by a majority of 6 out of 11 that the validity of the law will be postponed to the next Knesset because the bill in its immediate application is a personal law and is intended to serve a distinct personal purpose. Later, the court rejected a petition regarding the definition of Netanyahu as an incapacitated prime minister due to his ongoing trial and conflict of interests.
