= Haim Katz =

Israeli politician

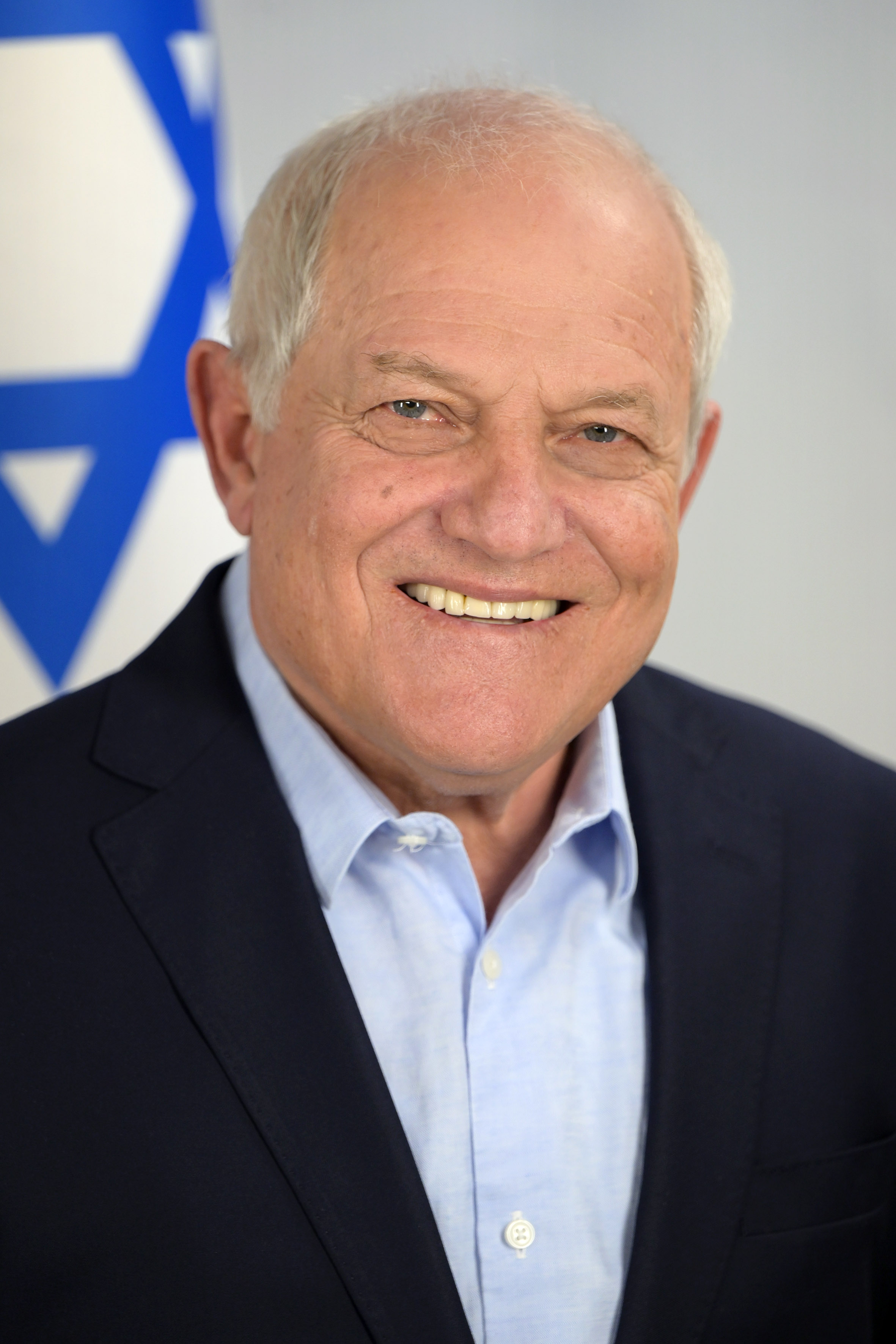
- Katz in 2023

Ministerial roles
- 2015–2019: Minister of Labor, Welfare and Social Services
- 2022–: Minister of Tourism
- 2025: Minister of National Security
- 2025: Minister of Heritage
- 2025: Minister of Development of the Periphery, the Negev and the Galilee
- 2025–: Minister of Housing and Construction
- 2025–: Minister of Health

Faction represented in the Knesset
- 1999–2003: One Nation
- 2003–2006: Likud
- 2006–2023: Likud

Personal details
- Born: 21 December 1947 (age 78) Germany

Haim Katz (Hebrew: חַיִּים כַּץ; born 21 December 1947) is an Israeli politician. He currently serves as the Minister of Tourism, Minister of Construction and Housing and Minister of Health. Katz was the Minister of Labor, Welfare and Social Services from 2015 to 2019, served as the Minister of National Security, Minister of Heritage and Minister of Development of the Periphery, the Negev and the Galilee in 2025, and served as a member of the Knesset for One Nation between 1999 and 2003, and for Likud between 2003 and 2023.

== Biography ==
Born in Germany in 1947, Katz emigrated to Israel in 1949. After finishing school and national service with the rank of master sergeant, he worked as an electronics technician. He became involved with trade unions when he became a member of the workers' council at Israel Aerospace Industries in 1983, and was also chairman of the technicians and engineers' union. In 1993 he became secretary of the National Workers Union of Israel Aircraft Industries, and was appointed chairman of the pension funds policy team of the Histadrut in 1996. Katz founded the Oz (Hebrew: עוז, lit. 'Strength') faction within the Histadrut.

Katz lives in Shoham and is married with three children. He is also a member of the Israel Football Association.

He serves as the chair of the Likud Central Committee.

== Knesset ==
In 1999 Katz joined the new One Nation party. He was placed second on its list for the elections that year, and was elected to the Knesset when the party won two seats.

Shortly before the 2003 election, he defected to Likud and was placed 37th on its list. He was re-elected as the party won 38 seats. As a Likud MK he was appointed chairman of the Labor, Welfare and Health Committee. He also initiated a bill banning MKs from serving as head of the Histadrut, meaning Amir Peretz had to resign from his post as Histadrut leader.

In the Likud primaries for the 2006 election, Katz gained thirteenth place on the party's list. Likud won only twelve seats and he lost his seat. However, when Natan Sharansky resigned from the Knesset in November 2006, Katz replaced him as the next member on the list. He retained his seat in the 2009 elections, for which he was placed fourteenth on the Likud list. He was re-elected again in 2013 and 2015. On 15 December 2019 Katz announced that he would support Gideon Sa'ar in the Likud leadership election.

== Cabinet positions ==
Katz was appointed Minister of Welfare and Social Services in the 2015 Netanyahu government.

Katz was appointed Minister of Tourism on 29 December 2022. He resigned from the Knesset on 6 January 2023 as part of the Norwegian Law.

On 26 September 2023, Katz became the first Israeli cabinet member to publicly visit Saudi Arabia to attend a UN World Tourism Organization (UNWTO) conference.

On 23 January 2025, he was appointed as interim minister for the Ministry of National Security, Heritage Ministry, and Ministry for the Development of the Periphery, the Negev and the Galilee, for a temporary term of three months after their previous ministers—Otzma Yehudit MKs Itamar Ben-Gvir, Amihai Eliyahu, and Yitzhak Wasserlauf—resigned from their positions in protest of the 2025 Gaza war ceasefire. Katz also joined the Security Cabinet. Two months later, the three portfolios were given back to Otzma Yehudit after they rejoined the government. On 15 June, Katz became Minister of Construction and Housing following the resignation of Yitzhak Goldknopf over the government's failure to pass a draft law.

Katz was appointed to the Ministry of Health in July 2025.

He was appointed the permanent house minister in September 2025, which was approved by the Knesset on 17 September, with 41 voting for it and 28 voting against it.

== Controversy ==
On 9 November 2021, Attorney General Avichai Mandelblit filed charges against Katz after Katz waived his parliamentary immunity and agreed to a plea deal. In December 2021 Katz admitted and was charged with conflict of interest and conspiracy to achieve a lawful purpose by improper means. He was expected to receive a suspended sentence and financial penalties. He also benefited from parliamentary immunity in 2020 for actions related to his work on Amendment 44 to the Securities Law, a provision allegedly passed with influence from a friend and business associate.
