= Ministry of Jerusalem Affairs (Israel) =

Israeli government ministry

- משרד ירושלים ומורשת

Agency overview
- Formed: 1988
- Jurisdiction: Government of Israel
- Minister responsible: Amihai Eliyahu Benjamin Netanyahu

The Ministry of Jerusalem Affairs is an occasional portfolio in the Israeli cabinet. It was first established under the government of Yitzhak Shamir on 27 November 1990, with Avraham Verdiger serving as deputy minister, although Avner Shaki had served as a Minister without Portfolio responsible for Jerusalem Affairs since 1988. However, the post was abolished by Prime Minister Yitzhak Rabin (who was also the portfolio holder) on 31 December 1992.

It was brought back in 2001 in Ariel Sharon's government. In 2005 the role reverted to being the responsibility of a Minister without Portfolio. Between 2013 and 2015 it was combined with the Diaspora Affairs portfolio as the Minister of Jerusalem and Diaspora Affairs.

== List of ministers ==
#	Minister	Party	Governments	Term start	Term end	Notes
Minister of Jerusalem Affairs
1	Avner Shaki	National Religious Party	23	27 December 1988	11 June 1990	
2	Yitzhak Shamir	Likud	24	27 November 1990	13 July 1992	Serving Prime Minister
3	Yitzhak Rabin	Labor Party	25	13 July 1992	31 December 1992	Serving Prime Minister
4	Eli Suissa	Shas	29	7 March 2001	23 May 2002	
–	Eli Suissa	Shas	29	3 June 2002	28 February 2003	
5	Natan Sharansky	Not an MK	30	3 March 2003	4 May 2005	Had been elected to the Knesset on the Yisrael BaAliyah
6	Haim Ramon	Labor Party	30	10 January 2005	23 November 2005	
7	Ya'akov Edri	Kadima	31	4 May 2006	4 July 2007	
Minister of Jerusalem and Diaspora Affairs
8	Benjamin Netanyahu	Likud	33	18 March 2013	29 April 2013	Serving Prime Minister
9	Naftali Bennett	The Jewish Home	33, 34	29 April 2013	19 May 2015	
Minister of Jerusalem Affairs and Heritage
10	Ze'ev Elkin	Likud	34	1 June 2016	17 May 2020	
11	Rafi Peretz	Likud	35	17 May 2020	13 June 2021	
–	Ze'ev Elkin	New Hope	36	13 June 2021	29 December 2022	
Minister of Jerusalem Affairs
12	Amihai Eliyahu	Otzma Yehudit	37	29 December 2022	21 January 2025	Minister of Heritage, serving alongside Meir Porush
13	Meir Porush	United Torah Judaism	37	23 January 2023	17 July 2025	Minister of Tradition, serving alongside Amichai Eliyahu
14	Haim Katz	Likud	37	23 January 2025	19 March 2025	Minister of Heritage, serving alongside Meir Porush
15	Amihai Eliyahu	Otzma Yehudit	37	19 March 2025		Minister of Heritage, serving alongside Meir Porush
16	Benjamin Netanyahu	Likud	37	July 2025		Minister of Tradition, serving alongside Amichai Eliyahu

=== Deputy ministers ===
#	Minister	Party	Governments	Term start	Term end
1	Avraham Verdiger	Agudat Yisrael	24	27 November 1990	13 July 1992
