= Ministry of Culture and Sport (Israel) =

Government ministry of Israel

- משרד התרבות והספורט وزارة الثقافة والرياضة

Agency overview
- Formed: 2009
- Jurisdiction: Government of Israel
- Minister responsible: Miki Zohar
- Website: www.mcs.gov.il

The Culture and Sport Ministry (Hebrew: משרד התרבות והספורט, Misrad HaTarbut VeHaSport; Arabic: وزارة الثقافة والرياضة, Wizarat al-Thaqafa wa al-Riyada) is a government ministry in Israel.

Culture and sport had been part of other ministerial portfolios for many years; between 1949 and 1999, and again from 2003 until 2006, culture was part of the Education portfolio. Similarly, sport was part of the Education portfolio between 1994 and 1999 and 2003 and 2006. Both culture and sport were combined with the Science and Technology portfolio between 2006 and 2009, before being split into a separate post upon the formation of a new government in March 2009.

== List of ministers ==
#	Minister	Party	Governments	Term start	Term end
Minister of Science, Culture and Sport
1	Matan Vilnai	Labor Party	28	5 August 1999	2 November 2002
2	Ophir Pines-Paz	Labor Party	31	4 May 2006	1 November 2006
3	Raleb Majadele	Labor Party	31	29 January 2007	31 March 2009
Minister of Culture and Sport
4	Limor Livnat	Likud	32, 33	31 March 2009	14 May 2015
5	Miri Regev	Likud	34	14 May 2015	17 May 2020
6	Hili Tropper	Blue and White	35, 36	17 May 2020	29 December 2022
7	Miki Zohar	Likud	37	29 December 2022	
