= Michael Malchieli =

Israeli politician

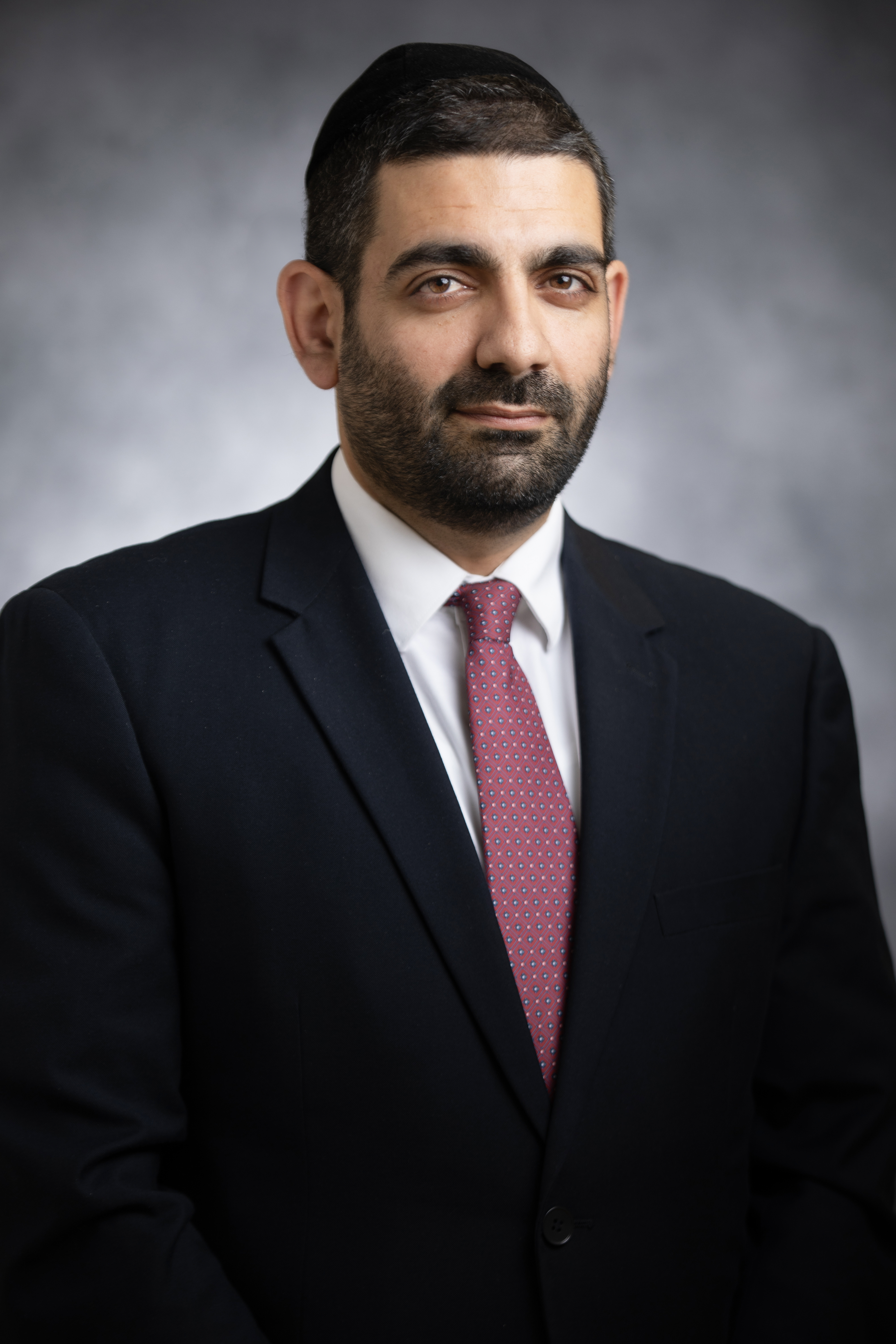
- Malchieli in 2024

Ministerial roles
- 2022–2025: Minister of Religious Affairs
- 2023: Minister of Interior

Faction represented in the Knesset
- 2016–: Shas

Personal details
- Born: 7 October 1982 (age 44) Jerusalem

Michael Malchieli (Hebrew: מִיכָאֵל מַלְכִּיאֵלִי; born 7 October 1982) is an Israeli politician who currently serves as a member of the Knesset for the Sephardi ultra-Orthodox Shas party and was Minister of Religious Affairs in the thirty-seventh government from 2022 until 2025. Malchieli also served as the acting Minister of Interior between January and April 2023.

== Biography ==
Malchieli was a pupil at the Hebron Yeshiva, and later gained a BA in education and Israel Heritage from Bayit VeGan College and studied for a master's in public policy at the Hebrew University of Jerusalem. He taught at Boys Town Jerusalem between 2005 and 2009, and was Rosh yeshiva at the Tiferet Zvi yeshiva from 2008 until 2013.

Malchieli is married, with five children, and lives in the East Jerusalem settlement of Neve Yaakov, where he was chairman of the neighbourhood council from 2012 to 2013.

== Political career ==
In 2013 he was elected to Jerusalem City Council, where he held the portfolio for ultra-Orthodox sports. He was also chief of staff to Minister of Religious Services David Azulai. He was placed eleventh on the Shas list for the 2015 Knesset elections. Although the party won only seven seats, he entered the Knesset on 2 November 2016 as a replacement for party leader Aryeh Deri, who resigned from the Knesset.

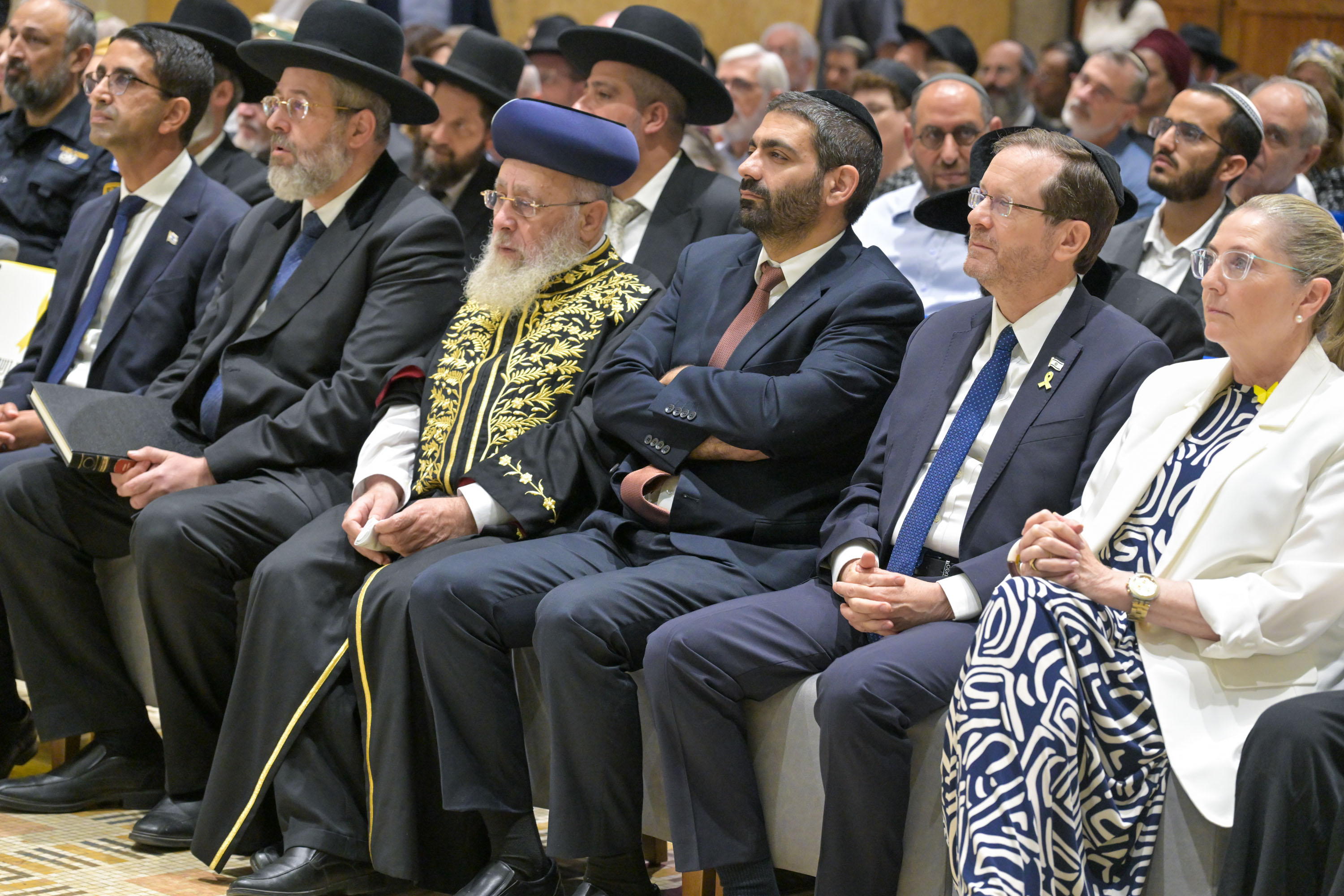

He was appointed the Minister of Religious Affairs in December 2022 and resigned his position in July 2025.

Malchieli also served as the acting Minister of Interior between January and April 2023.

He was appointed the head of the Knesset's special committee on Bridging Social Gaps in the Periphery in August 2025; he resigned from the chairmanship in October.

As Minister of Religious Affairs, Malchieli moved to roll back a 2022 reform by his predecessor Matan Kahana that had curbed the ministry's control over the appointment of municipal rabbis, including ten-year term limits and increased local representation on selection committees. After an initial bill stalled due to the Israel–Hamas war, Malchieli's ministry issued secondary regulations in April 2024 that gave the minister and the Chief Rabbinate a majority on the committees electing city rabbis, removed term limits, lowered the required proportion of women on the committees from 40 percent to a third, and allowed rabbis to serve past retirement age. More than 100 mayors signed a letter demanding the plan be cancelled.
