= Ruhama Avraham =

Israeli politician (born 1964)

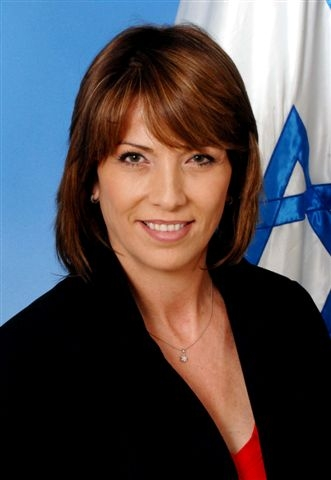

Ministerial roles
- 2007–2008: Minister without Portfolio
- 2008–2009: Minister of Tourism

Faction represented in the Knesset
- 2003–2005: Likud
- 2005–2013: Kadima

Personal details
- Born: 29 January 1964 (age 62) Rishon LeZion, Israel

Ruhama Avraham Balila (Hebrew: רוחמה אברהם בלילא; born 29 January 1964) is an Israeli former politician who served as a member of the Knesset for Likud and Kadima between 2003 and 2013. She also held the positions of Deputy minister of interior, Minister of Tourism and Minister without Portfolio responsible for liaison with the Knesset and was in charge of the Israel's 60th Independence Day celebrations.

== Biography ==
Avraham was born in Rishon LeZion. Graduated from the Rakusin School in Ramla in the field of drafting machines. She holds a B.A. in political science from Bar-Ilan University. and an MBA from Peres Academic Center, specializing in Organizational Management and Human Resources).

=== Political career ===
She began her political career as an assistant to Likud general manager Avigdor Lieberman in the early 1990s. from 1993 to 1999, she served as the Chief of Staff for then opposition leader Benjamin Netanyahu. She later served as a selection advisor to the Minister of National Infrastructures for Lieberman.

==== Likud Party ====
She ran in the Likud primaries in ahead of the 2003 election and won the 16th slot on the party list. She was subsequently elected to the Knesset as Likud won 38 seats.

She served as Chairperson of the Sub-Committee for Small and Medium Businesses, as well as a member of the Knesset Finance Committee, the Committee on the Status of Women and on the Special Committee on Foreign Workers. As chairman of the Small and Medium-Sized Enterprises Committee, she initiated the establishment of the State-guaranteed Small Business Loans Fund, which is currently managed by Bank Leumi and leveraged NIS 3 billion.

On 30 March 2005, she was appointed Deputy Minister of the Interior by then-Prime Minister Ariel Sharon.

On 1 November, Army Radio reported that Avraham and the deputy minister of the interior were traveling to Agrexco in the US with the funding of Agrexco. In August 2008, it was decided to close the case for lack of evidence.

At the end of 2005, Interior Minister Ophir Pines resigned. Avraham, who served as Deputy Minister of Interior, received the powers of the Minister of the Interior. She became the acting interior minister until the end of the 2006 election campaign. During her tenure as interior minister, the interior minister first came out with a municipal bond program that was implemented in the cities of Ramla, Yehud, Eilat and Ra'anana.

==== Kadima Party ====
At the end of November 2005, she left the Likud faction and together with Ariel Sharon, the prime minister and another 12 MKs, established the Kadima party. She was placed in the 18th place on the list and was elected to the 17th Knesset.

With the establishment of the 31st government of Israel headed by Ehud Olmert, Avraham was appointed chair of the House Committee, and in her position she directed a struggle to reduce the Arrangements Law – a law that would mean economic sanctions on the public, reducing it and canceling a quarter of its provisions. In addition, the most prominent law initiated by MK Avraham was the "Hot Meal for the Student Law", in which 250,000 students receive hot meals in schools

On 4 July 2007, as part of a round of government portfolios, Avraham was appointed to serve as the liaison between the government and the Knesset, which is responsible for the ceremony of the 60th anniversary of the State of Israel.

On 14 July 2008, the government appointed Avraham as tourism minister. In her role as Tourism Minister she canceled the visa to their tourist from Ukraine opened a representative office of the Ministry of Tourism in China and crossed the tourist 3 million line.

In the elections to the 18th Knesset, she was elected sixth on the Kadima list and in this Knesset served as Deputy Speaker of the Knesset, Chairperson of the Lobby for Minors and Mid-sized Businesses, Chairperson of the Lobby for Food Security, Member of the Knesset Foreign Affairs and Defense Committee.

During her tenure as a member of the Knesset, she was considered a Knesset member whose social agenda is very close to her heart. It initiated a number of major laws, including:

- Hot meal law for students
- The Food Security Council Law – The establishment of a national council to initiate a comprehensive plan to combat poverty.
- An amendment to the Value Added Tax Law, which stipulates that small and medium-sized businesses shall be the date for payment of tax on the date of receipt of the payment and not on the day of service.
- Amendment to the Tenant Rights Law in public housing, which regulates the distribution of rights in public housing in the event of separation between spouses.
- The law of hot meal plan for schoolchildren, which led to approximately 250,000 pupils to a hot meal in schools.
- Amendment to the Tenant Rights Law in public housing, which regulates the distribution of rights in public housing in case of separation of spouses.
- Amendment to the Administration & Law Ordinance (Abolition of Law, Jurisdiction and Administration), which was initiated during the 17th Knesset with Avigdor Yitzhaki. The amendment states that an agreement or government decision, according to which the law, jurisdiction and administration of Israel, will not apply to a territory, will require the approval of the Knesset and will be brought to a referendum. The law also regulates the way to conduct a referendum.
- Amendment to the Computers Law that prohibits the editing and transfer of software that causes damage to a computer or computer material, even if there is no actual damage, if it was done in order to penetrate the computer, to perform actions that result in false information or output or to perform secret monitoring.

Amendment to the Law and Administration Law:

The amendment provides that an agreement or government decision according to which the law, jurisdiction and administration of the State of Israel shall not apply to territory shall be subject to the approval of the Knesset and shall be brought to a referendum. The law also regulates the way to conduct a referendum.

An amendment to the Computers Law that prohibits the editing and transfer of software that causes damage to the computer or the computer material, even if there is no actual damage if the purpose is to penetrate the computer, to perform actions that result in false information or output or to carry out wiretapping.

Following the dissolution of the 18th Knesset, Avraham announced in October 2012 that she would not seek re-election in the 2013 election.

=== After politics ===
Since 2017, she has served as an external director at Minrav and Canada's Ski Line.

Between 2013 and 2019 She also served as a strategic consultant to companies and organizations.

Since 2019, she is serving as the General Manager of Real Estate Participations in Israel Ltd., a subsidiary of the Jewish Agency for Israel.

=== Personal life ===
She is divorced and a mother of two. She speaks Hebrew, Ladino and English. She lives in Petah Tikva.
