= Ministry of Diaspora Affairs and Combating Antisemitism =

Israeli government ministry

- משרד התפוצות והמאבק באנטישמיות
- Emblem of Israel

Agency overview
- Formed: 1999
- Jurisdiction: Government of Israel
- Minister responsible: Amichai Chikli
- Agency executive: Avi Cohen-Scali, Director-General
- Website: www.gov.il

The Ministry of Diaspora Affairs (Hebrew: משרד התפוצות והמאבק באנטישמיות, romanized: Misrad HaTfutzot VeHaMa'avak BaAntishimiut) is a government ministry in Israel. As a ministerial post in the Israeli cabinet, it has gone under several different names and was combined with the Jerusalem portfolio between 2013 and 2015. Between June and November 2005 there was also a Deputy Minister.

== History ==
The department was created under a deputy ministry called the Ministry of Israeli Society and the World Jewish Community in 1999, with a budget of approximately $2 million. Rabbi Michael Melchior was the inaugural minister, with the goal to improve Israel-Jewish diaspora relations, combat antisemitism, and create education and Israel experience programs.

The ministry was temporarily closed in February 2007, with responsibilities moved to the Department for Policy and Implementation in the Prime Minister's Office.

In 2023, the ministry organized three delegations of security personnel from the Baltic states, Brazil, and Belgium to visit Israel and provide tools to handle antisemitic attacks in their respective countries.

Amid the global rise of antisemitism during the Gaza war, the ministry allocated $2.2 million for protecting Jewish institutions and programs in Jewish schools.

In January 2024, the Center for the Study of Contemporary European Jewry at Tel Aviv University called in a report for the Israeli government to shut down the ministry, stating that it was "established for political reasons, lacked vision and substance, and had promoted few initiatives. The center recommended the ministry's duties be divided between the Israeli Foreign Ministry and the Prime Minister's Office. The report's conclusions mirrored the beliefs of some Israeli diplomats that the ministry lacked purpose and did not have the personnel to fight antisemitism abroad.

== List of portfolio holders ==
#	Minister	Party	Governments	Term start	Term end	Notes
Minister of Social and Diaspora Affairs
1	Michael Melchior	One Israel	28	5 August 1999	7 March 2001	
2	Natan Sharansky	Likud	30	3 March 2003	4 May 2006	
Minister of Diaspora, Society and the Fight Against Antisemitism
3	Isaac Herzog	Labor Party	31	21 March 2007	31 March 2009	
Minister of Public Diplomacy and Diaspora Affairs
4	Yuli-Yoel Edelstein	Likud	32	31 March 2009	18 March 2013	
Minister of Jerusalem and Diaspora Affairs
5	Benjamin Netanyahu	Likud	33	18 March 2013	29 April 2013	Serving Prime Minister
6	Naftali Bennett	The Jewish Home	33, 34	29 April 2013	1 June 2015	
Minister of Diaspora Affairs
–	Naftali Bennett	The Jewish Home	33, 34	1 June 2015	2 June 2019	
7	Tzipi Hotovely	Likud	34	5 January 2020	17 May 2020	
8	Omer Yankelevich	Blue and White	35	17 May 2020	13 June 2021	
9	Nachman Shai	Labor Party	36	13 June 2021	29 December 2022	
10	Amichai Chikli	Likud	37	29 December 2022		

=== Deputy ministers ===
#	Minister	Party	Governments	Term start	Term end
1	Michael Melchior	Meimad	30	20 June 2005	23 November 2005
