= Ministry for the Development of the Periphery, the Negev and the Galilee =

Government ministry of Israel

- המשרד לפיתוח הפריפריה, הנגב והגליל

Agency overview
- Formed: January 2005
- Jurisdiction: Government of Israel
- Minister responsible: Yitzhak Wasserlauf
- Website: Official website

The Ministry for the Development of the Periphery, the Negev and the Galilee (Hebrew: הַמִּשְׂרָד לְפִּיתּוּחַ הַפֶּרִיפֶרְיָה, הַנֶּגֶב וְהַגָּלִיל, HaMisrad LeFitu'ah HaPeriferya, HaNegev VeHaGalil) is a ministry within the Israeli government. Established in January 2005, it is currently headed by Yitzhak Wasserlauf of Otzma Yehudit.

In the past, Israel also had a Minister for Development. This office was replaced in the 1970s by the Energy and Infrastructure Minister, a role now known as the National Infrastructure Minister.

== Minister ==
#	Minister	Party	Governments	Term start	Term end
1	Shimon Peres	Kadima	31	10 January 2006	13 June 2007
2	Yaakov Edri	Kadima	31	4 July 2007	31 March 2009
3	Silvan Shalom	Likud	32, 33	31 March 2009	14 May 2015
4	Aryeh Deri	Shas	34, 35	14 May 2015	13 June 2021
4	Oded Forer	Yisrael Beiteinu	36	13 June 2021	29 December 2022
5	Yitzhak Wasserlauf	Otzma Yehudit	37	29 December 2022	21 January 2025
5	Haim Katz	Likud	37	23 January 2025	19 March 2025
6	Yitzhak Wasserlauf	Otzma Yehudit	37	19 March 2025	

=== Deputy ministers ===
#	Minister	Party	Governments	Term start	Term end
1	Ayoob Kara	Likud	32	31 March 2009	18 March 2013

== See also ==
- Minister in the Prime Minister's Office
