= Oded Forer =

Israeli politician (born 1977)

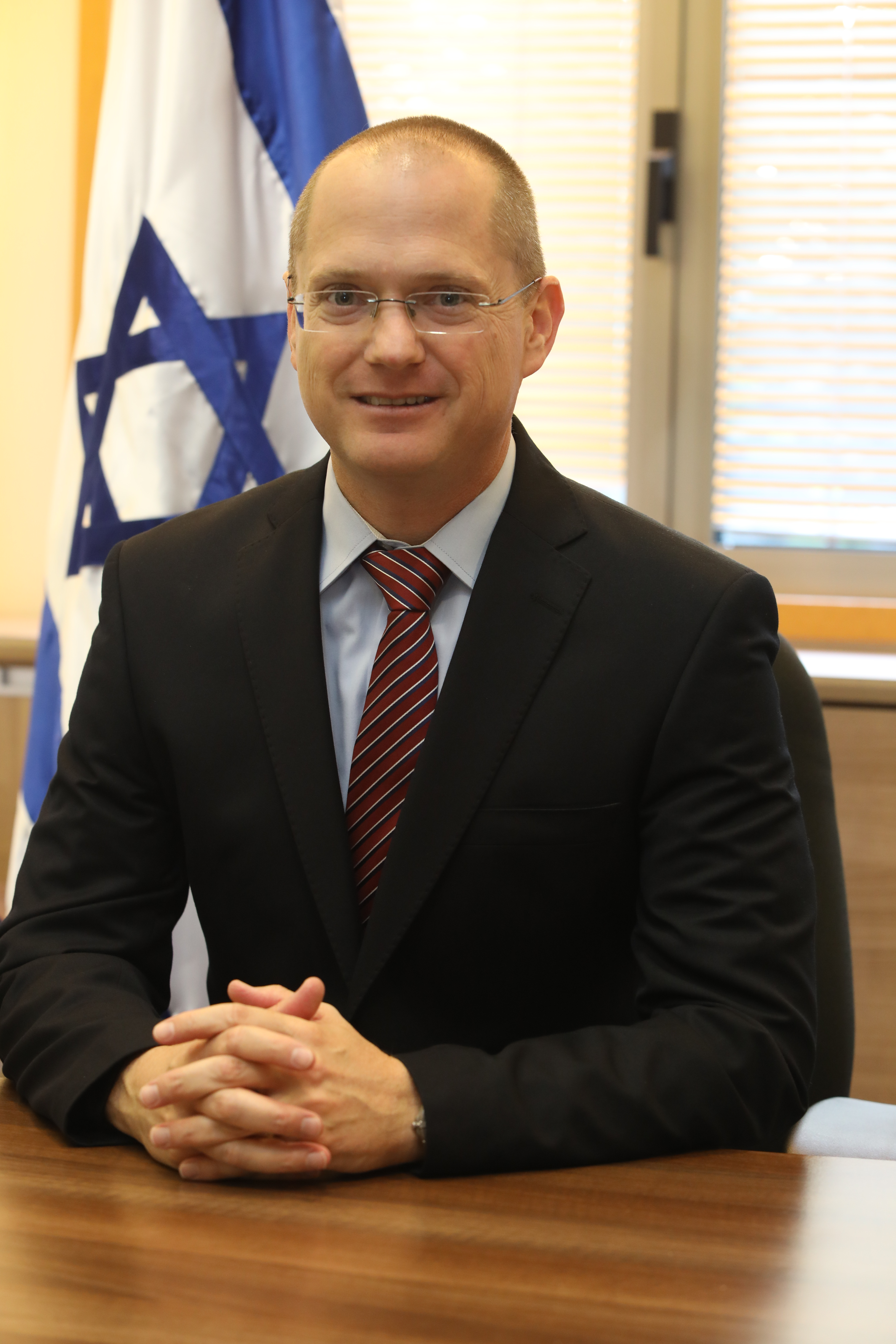
- Forer in 2017

Ministerial roles
- 2021–2022: Minister of Agriculture and Rural Development
- 2021–2022: Minister for the Development of the Periphery, the Negev and the Galilee

Faction represented in the Knesset
- 2015–2021: Yisrael Beiteinu
- 2022–: Yisrael Beiteinu

Personal details
- Born: 30 May 1977 (age 49) Rehovot, Israel

Oded Forer (Hebrew: עוֹדֵד פוֹרֵר; born 30 May 1977) is an Israeli politician who currently serves as a member of the Knesset for Yisrael Beiteinu since 2022, previously serving from 2015 to 2021. Forer also served as the Minister of Agriculture and Rural Development and Minister for the Development of the Periphery, the Negev and the Galilee from 2021 to 2022.

== Biography ==
Forer was born and raised in Rehovot. His father, Shuki Forer, served as the city's mayor. His paternal great-grandfather was one of the first pioneers to settle in Rehovot during the First Aliyah. Forer was an officer in the Israeli Navy. He worked as a political consultant for Education Minister Limor Livnat between 2001 and 2005 and served as secretary of the Israeli Council for Culture and Arts. In 2005, he founded a consulting company.

Forer is a graduate of the Interdisciplinary Center Herzliya, with a Bachelor of Law and Administration and a Masters in Political Communication. He is married with three children and lives in Rehovot.

== Political career ==
In the buildup to the 2008 Knesset elections Forer campaigned for the Shfela region slot on the Likud list; however, following the party primaries, he ended up in 109th place on the party's list.

In 2011, he joined Yisrael Beiteinu, becoming chairman of its youth division. He was placed sixteenth on the party's list for the 2013 Knesset elections. However, after Yisrael Beiteinu formed a joint list with Likud, he was placed 43rd, failing to win a seat.

In 2013 he was appointed Director-General of the Ministry of Immigrant Absorption, under Minister Sofa Landver. During his tenure, rates of aliyah increased by 30%.

Prior to the 2015 Knesset elections he was placed eighth on the Yisrael Beiteinu list. Although he failed to enter the Knesset when the party won six seats, he was moved up to seventh on the list after Ilan Shohat chose not to take his seat, allowing Robert Ilatov to serve in his stead. In September 2015, Sharon Gal chose to leave the Knesset, allowing Forer to take his seat on 4 September. He was subsequently re-elected in elections in April 2019, September 2019 and 2020.

After being re-elected again in the 2021 elections, he was appointed Minister of Agriculture and Rural Development and Minister for the Development of the Periphery, the Negev and the Galilee in the thirty-sixth government. He introduced legislation to prohibit the use of battery cages and colony cages for egg-laying hens by 2038. It was approved by the Knesset in June 2022.

After his 2021 re-election and ministerial appointment, Forer resigned from the Knesset under the Norwegian Law and was replaced by Limor Magen Telem.
