= Limor Magen Telem =

Israeli politician

- לימור מגן תלם
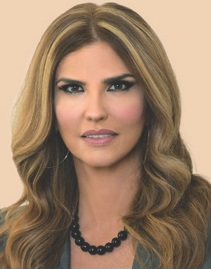

Faction represented in the Knesset
- 2021–2022: Yisrael Beiteinu

Personal details
- Born: 17 March 1971 (age 55) Haifa, Israel

Limor Magen Telem (Hebrew: לימור מגן תלם; born 17 March 1971) is an Israeli politician. She was a member of Knesset for Yisrael Beiteinu.

== Biography ==
Limor Magen (later Magen-Telem) was raised in Haifa and attended the Hebrew Reali School. Aged 17, she took part in the Miss Israel 1988 pageant coming in second place, and was crowned Miss Europe Israel the same year. During her national service, she served in the Israeli Navy. Magen-Telem studied law at the University of Haifa, attaining a Master of Laws. She worked as an attorney and then as a legal advisor to the Migdal Haemek municipality between 2001 and 2021.

== Political career ==
Telem-Magen was placed ninth on the Yisrael Beiteinu list for the 2021 elections. Although the party won only eight seats, she entered the Knesset on 15 June 2021 as a replacement for Oded Forer, after he was appointed to the cabinet and resigned from the Knesset under the Norwegian Law.

== See also ==
- Women of Israel
