= Yaakov Edri =

Israeli politician (1950–2026)

- יעקב אדרי
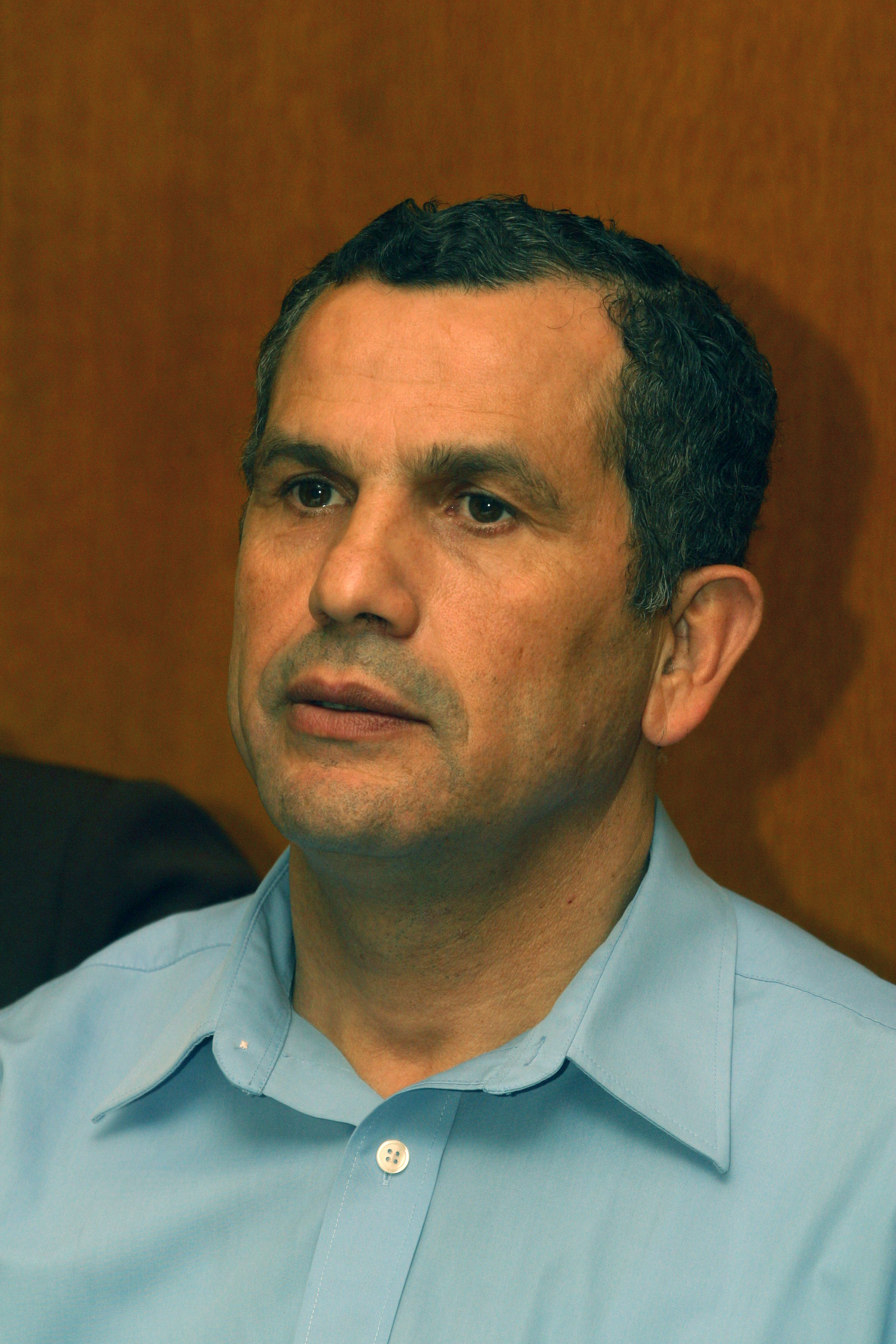
- Edri in 2003

Ministerial roles
- 2006: Minister of Health
- 2006–2007: Minister without Portfolio
- 2007–2008: Minister of Immigrant Absorption
- 2007–2009: Minister of Negev & Galilee Development

Faction represented in the Knesset
- 2003–2005: Likud
- 2005–2013: Kadima

Personal details
- Born: 25 November 1950 Morocco
- Died: 18 March 2026 (aged 75)

Ya'akov Edri (Hebrew: יעקב אדרי; also spelt Edery or Edrey, 25 November 1950 – 18 March 2026) was an Israeli politician who served as mayor of Or Akiva from 1989 to 2003. He served as a member of the Knesset for Likud and Kadima between 2003 and 2013, as well as holding the posts of Minister of Immigrant Absorption, Minister of Negev and Galilee Development, Minister of Health, and a Minister without Portfolio.

== Life and career ==
On 25 February 2007, Edri was appointed to be responsible for Israel's sixtieth anniversary celebrations. On the same day, he was questioned under caution on suspicion of having tried to receive personal benefits in return for promoting a police commander, Ya'akov Zigdon, whilst he was Deputy Minister of Internal Security. He denied the charges.

Edri retained his seat in the 2009 elections after being placed thirteenth on the Kadima list. On 5 December 2012, in the days leading up to the 2013 elections, with polls showing Kadima either barely getting into the Knesset or not even passing the threshold, Edri announced he would not be contesting the elections.

Edri praised the execution of Saddam Hussein and said that all enemies of the Jewish people would face the same fate.

Edri was mayor of Or Akiva. He was arrested in 2020 on suspicion of bribery, fraud, breach of trust, and other corruption offenses. On 20 March 2023, Edri was charged with bribery, money laundering, and physical assault. Edri resigned as mayor after the charges were filed. The prosecution claimed that he accepted NIS 569,000 between 2013 and 2020.

== Death ==
Edri died on 18 March 2026.
