= Thirty-first government of Israel =

2006–2009 government led by Ehud Olmert

Olmert cabinet
- 31st Cabinet of Israel

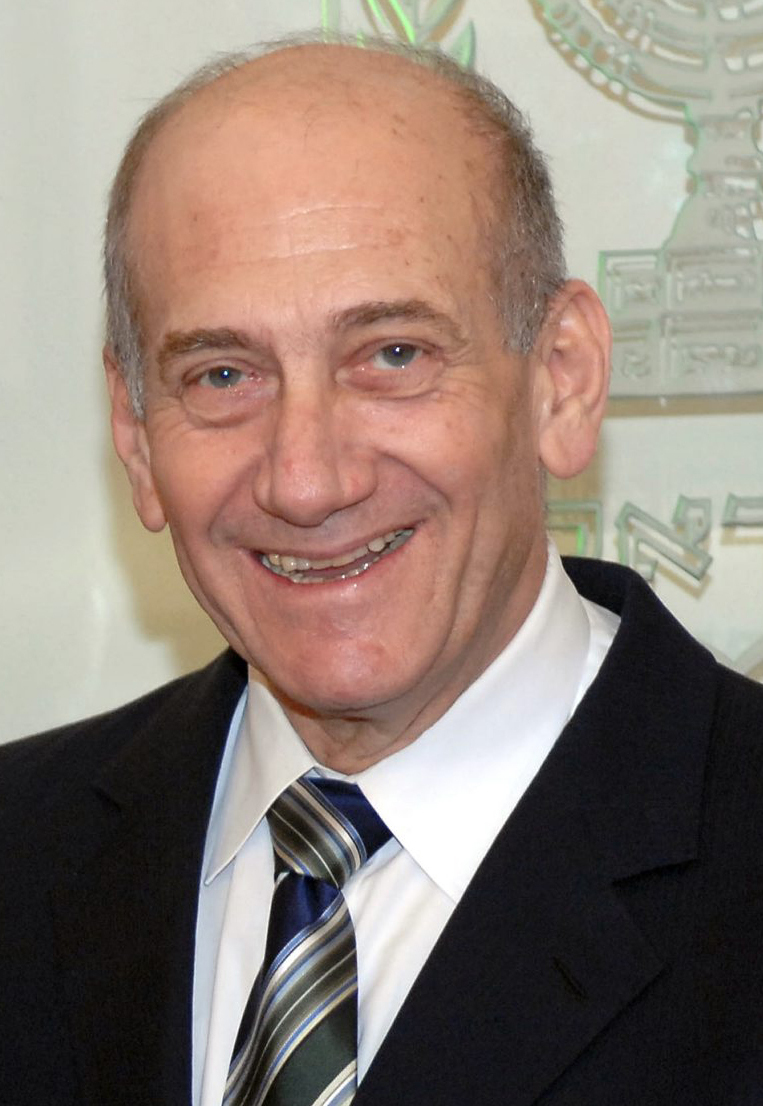
- Date formed: 4 May 2006
- Date dissolved: 31 March 2009

People and organisations
- Head of state: Moshe Katsav (until 1 July 2007); Shimon Peres (since 1 July 2007)
- Head of government: Ehud Olmert
- Member party: Kadima; Labor; Shas; Gil; Yisrael Beiteinu (November 2006–16 January 2008)
- Status in legislature: Coalition government
- Opposition party: Likud
- Opposition leader: Binyamin Netanyahu

History
- Election: 2006
- Legislature term: 17th Knesset
- Predecessor: Thirtieth government
- Successor: Thirty-second government

The thirty-first government of Israel was formed by Ehud Olmert on 4 May 2006, following Kadima's victory in the March elections. His coalition initially included Labor, Shas and Gil, and held 67 of the 120 seats in the Knesset. The 11-seat Yisrael Beiteinu joined the coalition in November 2006, but left on 16 January 2008 in protest at peace talks with the Palestinian National Authority. With the inclusion of the Labor Party's Raleb Majadele as a Minister without Portfolio on 29 January 2007, it became the first Israeli cabinet to have a Muslim minister. The makeup of the coalition resulted in a center-left government.

The government held office until Benjamin Netanyahu formed the thirty-second government on 31 March 2009, following elections the month before.

== Cabinet members ==
Position	Person	Party
Prime Minister	Ehud Olmert	Kadima
Vice Prime Minister	Shimon Peres (until 13 June 2007)^{1}	Kadima
Vice Prime Minister	Haim Ramon	Kadima
Acting Prime Minister	Tzipi Livni	Kadima
Deputy Prime Minister	Ehud Barak (from 18 June 2007)^{2}	Labor Party
Deputy Prime Minister	Avigdor Lieberman (30 October 2006 – 18 January 2008)	Yisrael Beiteinu
Deputy Prime Minister	Shaul Mofaz	Kadima
Deputy Prime Minister	Amir Peretz (until 18 June 2007)^{2}	Labor Party
Deputy Prime Minister	Eli Yishai	Shas
Minister of Agriculture	Shalom Simhon	Labor Party
Minister of Communications	Ariel Atias	Shas
Minister of Defense	Amir Peretz (until 18 June 2007)^{2}	Labor Party
Minister of Defense	Ehud Barak (from 18 June 2007)^{2}	Labor Party
Minister of Development of the Negev and Galilee	Shimon Peres (until 13 June 2007)^{1}	Kadima
Minister of Development of the Negev and Galilee	Ya'akov Edri (from 4 July 2007)	Kadima
Minister of Diaspora, Society and the fight against Anti-semitism	Isaac Herzog (from 21 March 2007)	Labor Party
Minister of Education, Culture and Sport	Yuli Tamir	Labor Party
Minister of the Environment	Gideon Ezra	Kadima
Minister of Finance	Avraham Hirschson (until 3 July 2007)	Kadima
Minister of Finance	Roni Bar-On (from 4 July 2007)	Kadima
Minister of Foreign Affairs	Tzipi Livni	Kadima
Minister of Health	Ya'akov Ben-Yezri	Gil
Minister of Housing and Construction	Meir Sheetrit (until 4 July 2007)	Kadima
Minister of Housing and Construction	Ze'ev Boim (from 4 July 2007)	Kadima
Minister of Immigrant Absorption	Ze'ev Boim (until 4 July 2007)	Kadima
Minister of Immigrant Absorption	Ya'akov Edri (4 July 2007 – 14 July 2008)	Kadima
Minister of Immigrant Absorption	Eli Aflalo (from 14 July 2008)	Kadima
Minister of Industry, Trade and Labour	Eli Yishai	Shas
Minister of Internal Affairs	Roni Bar-On (until 4 July 2007)	Kadima
Minister of Internal Affairs	Meir Sheetrit (from 4 July 2007)	Kadima
Minister of Internal Security	Avi Dichter	Kadima
Minister of Justice	Haim Ramon (until 22 August 2006)	Kadima
Minister of Justice	Tzipi Livni (29 November 2006 – 7 February 2007)	Kadima
Minister of Justice	Daniel Friedmann	Not an MK
Minister of National Infrastructure	Binyamin Ben-Eliezer	Labor Party
Minister of Pensioner Affairs	Rafi Eitan	Gil
Minister of Religious Affairs	Yitzhak Cohen (from 14 January 2008)	Shas
Minister of Science, Culture and Sport	Ophir Pines-Paz (until 1 November 2006)^{3}	Labor Party
Minister of Science, Culture and Sport	Raleb Majadele (from 21 March 2007)	Labor Party
Minister of Strategic Affairs	Avigdor Lieberman (30 October 2006 – 18 January 2008)	Yisrael Beiteinu
Minister of Tourism	Isaac Herzog (until 21 March 2007)	Labor Party
Minister of Tourism	Yitzhak Aharonovich (21 March 2007 – 18 January 2008)	Yisrael Beiteinu
Minister of Tourism	Ruhama Avraham (from 14 July 2008)	Kadima
Minister of Transportation and Road Safety	Shaul Mofaz	Kadima
Minister of Welfare and Social Services	Ehud Olmert (until 21 March 2007)	Kadima
Minister of Welfare and Social Services	Isaac Herzog (from 21 March 2007)	Labor Party
Minister without Portfolio	Ruhama Avraham (4 July 2007 – 14 July 2008)	Kadima
Minister without Portfolio	Ami Ayalon (24 September 2007 – 16 December 2008)	Labor Party
Minister without Portfolio	Eitan Cabel (until 4 May 2007)	Labor Party
Minister without Portfolio	Yitzhak Cohen (until 14 January 2008)	Shas
Minister without Portfolio	Ya'akov Edri (until 4 July 2007)	Kadima
Minister without Portfolio	Raleb Majadele (29 January – 21 March 2007)	Labor Party
Minister without Portfolio	Meshulam Nahari	Shas
Deputy Minister of Defense	Efraim Sneh (30 October 2006 – 18 June 2007)	Labor Party
Deputy Minister of Defense	Matan Vilnai (from 2 July 2007)	Labor Party
Deputy Minister of Foreign Affairs	Majalli Wahabi (from 29 October 2007)	Kadima

^{1} Peres left office when elected President.

^{2} Barak replaced Peretz when he defeated him in the party leadership election.

^{3} Pines-Paz resigned from the government in protest at the inclusion of Yisrael Beiteinu.
