= Yitzhak Goldknopf =

Israeli politician

- יצחק גולדקנופף
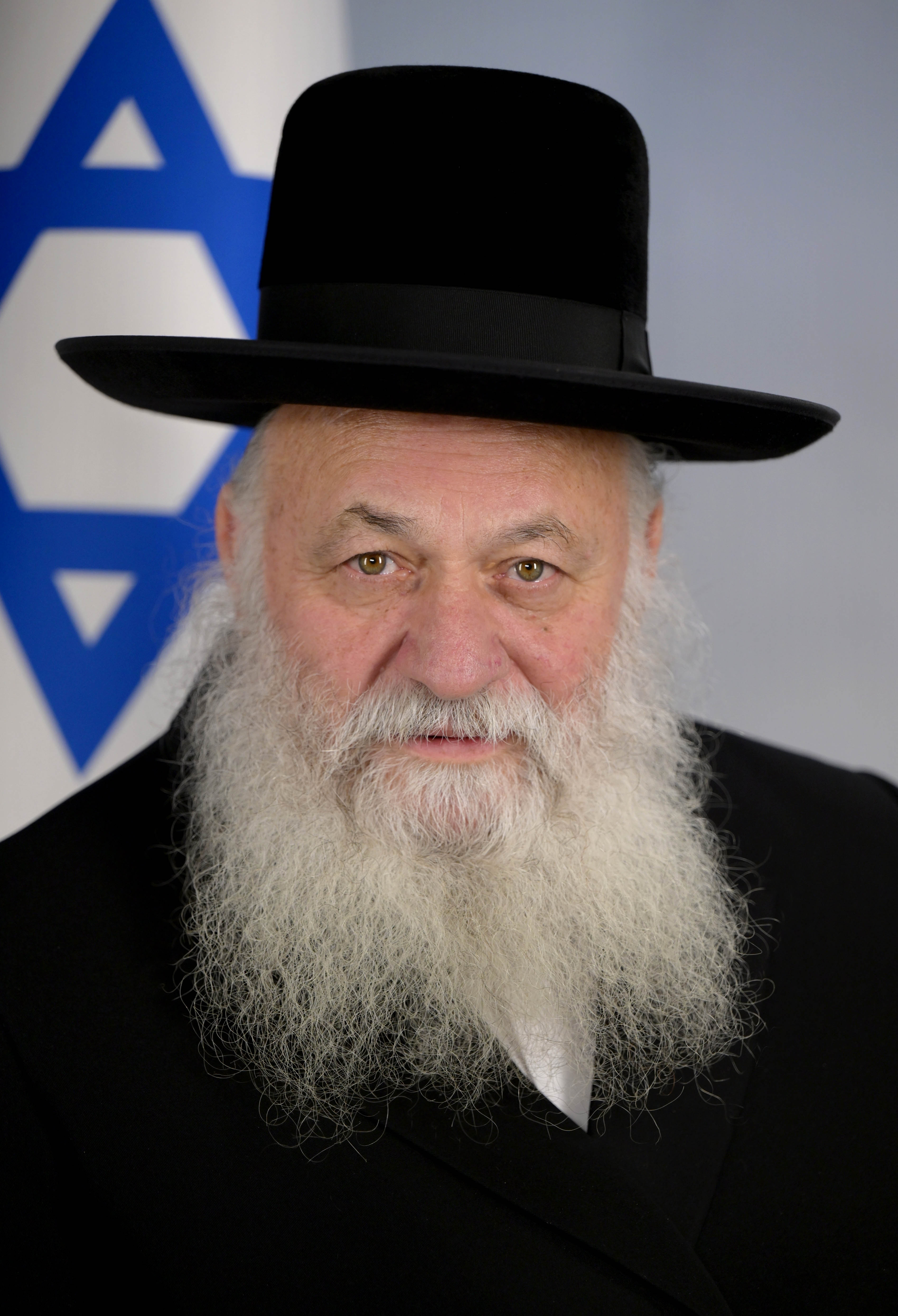
- Official portrait, 2023

Ministerial roles
- 2022–2025: Minister of Housing & Construction

Faction represented in the Knesset
- 2022–2023: United Torah Judaism
- 2025–: United Torah Judaism

Personal details
- Born: Yitzhak Issachar Goldknopf; 30 October 1950 (age 76) Jerusalem, Israel
- Party: Agudat Yisrael
- Spouse: Rivka Goldknopf (m. 1972)
- Children: 10
- Occupation: Rabbi • Businessman • Politician

Yitzhak Issachar Goldknopf (Hebrew: יצחק יששכר גולדקנופף; born 30 October 1950) is an Israeli politician who serves as the leader of Agudat Yisrael, and as a member of the Knesset on the party's behalf. Goldknopf also served as leader of the United Torah Judaism party between 2022 and 2026, as the Minister of Housing and Construction between 2022 and 2025, and as a member of the Jerusalem City Council.

== Biography ==
Goldknopf was born in Jerusalem to Malka and Yehuda, a follower of the Ger Hasidic dynasty. Goldknopf is married, and has ten children. Goldknopf is CEO of the Beit Yaakov and Beit Petahia kindergartens and daycare centers, which he inherited from his father.

=== Political career ===
Goldknopf is a member of Agudat Yisrael's national committee. He was elected to the Jerusalem City Council in 2003.

Yaakov Aryeh Alter, rebbe of the Ger dynasty, appointed Goldknopf to replace Yaakov Litzman as leader of Agudat Yisrael in June 2022. Goldknopf was additionally assigned the first spot on the party's electoral list ahead of the 2022 election, and was elected to the 25th Knesset. He was appointed Minister of Housing and Construction on 29 December 2022, and resigned his seat on 6 January 2023, as part of the Norwegian Law.

He is well-known in the religious community because of his position as chair of the "Committee for the Sanctity of the Sabbath". The committee has fought for restrictions in the Israeli public space, including a campaign that forced El Al to stop flying on Saturdays. Goldknopf intervened in a highly publicized spat in 2022 between the Ger leadership and Knesset member Meir Porush, who accused them of undermining his bid for Mayor of Jerusalem.

After failing to pass a bill that would maintain exemptions for Haredi conscription, he announced his resignation on 12 June 2025 from his ministry in Benjamin Netanyahu's cabinet, and returned to the Knesset per the Norwegian Law.

=== Controversies ===
In March 2025, Goldknopf was filmed dancing at a wedding to an anti-Zionist Neturei Karta song about Haredi draft evasion. He subsequently apologized and responded that it was a family wedding and he did not approve of the song, but did not want to offend the groom's family. Party leaders Benny Gantz, Yair Lapid, Avigdor Lieberman, and Bezalel Smotrich condemned the incident, as did former prime minister Naftali Bennett.

In July 2025, Goldknopf said that Haredi Jews would leave Israel rather than serve in the IDF.
