= Yitzhak Wasserlauf =

Israeli politician

- יצחק וסרלאוף
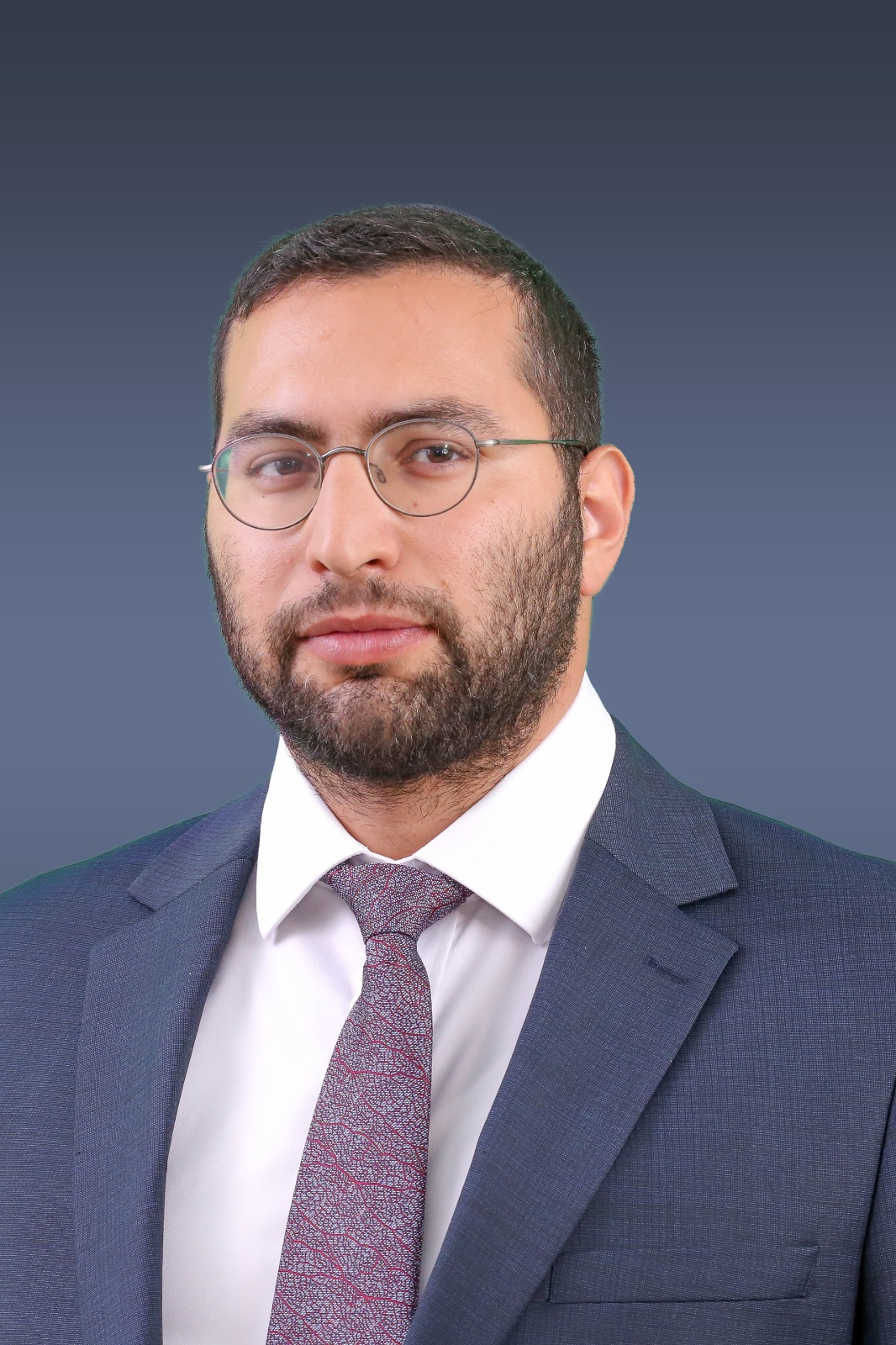
- Wasserlauf in 2022

Ministerial roles
- 2022–2025: Minister for the Development of the Periphery, the Negev, and the Galilee
- 2025–: Minister for the Development of the Periphery, the Negev, and the Galilee

Faction represented in the Knesset
- 2022–: Otzma Yehudit

Personal details
- Born: Yitzhak Shimon Wasserlauf; 14 August 1992 (age 34) Jerusalem
- Party: Otzma Yehudit (since 2013)
- Other political affiliations: National Union (2009–2013)
- Spouse: Moriah Wasserlauf
- Children: 3
- Education: Yeshivat Ma'alot

Yitzhak Shimon Wasserlauf (Hebrew: יצחק שמעון וסרלאוף; born 14 August 1992) is an Israeli politician who has served as the Minister for the Development of the Periphery, the Negev, and the Galilee since 2025, and currently serves as a member of Knesset for Otzma Yehudit, following the 2022 Israeli legislative election.

== Biography ==
Wasserlauf was born in the Old City of Jerusalem to a religious Zionist family. He became the deputy chairman of the youth wing of the National Union Party at age 17.

He participated in the hesder program during his enlistment in the Israel Defense Forces' Golani Brigade, allowing him to divide his time between yeshiva and army service. Between 2014 and 2019, he taught at the Hesder Yeshiva Oz Ve'emuna in Tel Aviv, which he founded alongside Rabbi Ahiad Ettinger. Ettinger was killed in a shooting near Ariel in 2019.

== Political career ==
For the September 2019 Knesset elections he was placed fourth in the Otzma Yehudit list, but was not elected to the Knesset as Otzma Yehudit was below the election threshold. Placed second in the 2020 Israeli legislative election, the party again did not pass the election threshold.

Prior to the elections for the 21st Knesset he joined Otzma Yehudit. In the elections for the 25th Knesset, he was placed fifth on the list, which won 14 mandates. Wasserlauf was elected to the Knesset and sworn in on 15 November 2022. He was appointed to the Ministry for the Development of the Periphery, the Negev, and the Galilee. Upon being sworn in on 15 November 2022, Wasserlauf became the youngest member of the 25th Knesset.

On 1 April 2024, in an interview with Radio North, Wasserlauf criticized Prime Minister Benjamin Netanyahu's treatment of residents in northern Israel and called for a resettlement of Jewish residents in the Gaza Strip in order to secure "total victory" over Hamas. In July, he compared gay marriage to incest but later denied making that statement, saying: "I am comparing arguments that claim because a couple is in love, they should enjoy all the rights. Why shouldn't others who are also in love? There is a standard, and I drew the line where others have not."

On 17 January 2025, Otzma Yehudit held a press conference in which they announced their intention to withdraw from the coalition if the government accepted the three-phase ceasefire proposal. The proposal was accepted, and Wasserlauf subsequently resigned alongside the rest of the party's ministers when the ceasefire went into effect on 19 January 2025. His term ended on 21 January. Otzma Yehudit has stated its intention to rejoin the governing coalition if the deal does not result in a permanent ceasefire.

The cabinet approved Wasserlauf's re-appointment on 18 March, and it was approved by the Knesset the following day.

In March 2026, an anti-government activist was arrested after sending messages to Wasserlauf, with one of them reading: "You are not Jews, you are enemies."

== Personal life ==
Wasserlauf lives in a neighborhood in northern Tel Aviv. He previously lived in the neighborhood of Shapira. He is married, and has three children.
