= Amihai Eliyahu =

Israeli politician (born 1979)

- עמיחי אליהו
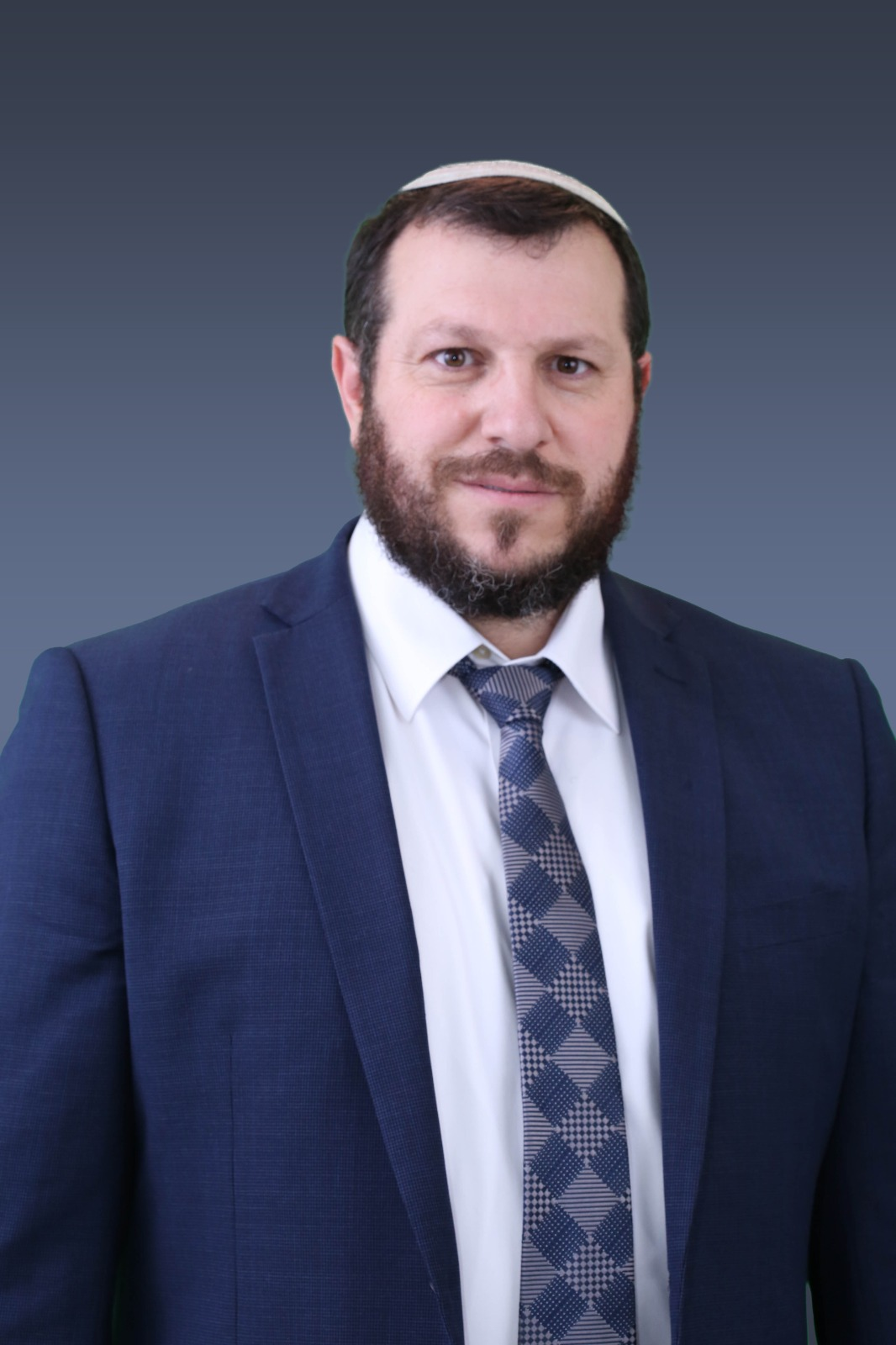

Ministerial roles
- 2022–2025: Minister of Heritage
- 2025–: Minister of Heritage

Faction represented in the Knesset
- 2022–2023: Otzma Yehudit
- 2025–: Otzma Yehudit

Personal details
- Born: 24 April 1979 (age 47) Jerusalem, Israel
- Party: Otzma Yehudit
- Children: 6
- Parent(s): Shmuel Eliyahu (father); Mordechai Eliyahu (paternal grandfather)

Amihai Ben-Eliyahu (Hebrew: עמיחי בן אליהו; born 24 April 1979), commonly known as Amihai Eliyahu (Hebrew: עמיחי אליהו), is an Israeli far-right politician and activist who has served as Minister of Heritage since 2025. Eliyahu is a member of the Knesset for Otzma Yehudit.

In 2023, Eliyahu received international attention for his suggestion that nuclear weapons be used in the Gaza Strip in the Gaza war. He is a resident of the West Bank settlement of Rimonim.

In January 2025, Eliyahu resigned from his ministerial position in response to the 2025 Gaza war ceasefire, and rejoined the Knesset in accordance with the Norwegian Law. He rejoined the cabinet in March.

== Biography ==
Eliyahu was born in Jerusalem and raised in Shlomi, a town in Northern Israel. He is the son of Shmuel Eliyahu and the grandson of Mordechai Eliyahu, the former Sephardi Chief Rabbi of Israel. He attended various Israeli yeshivas, and during his IDF service was in the Paratroopers Brigade and fought in the 2006 Lebanon War.

== Political career ==
Before joining Otzma Yehudit, Eliyahu supported the National Union party. He was placed 18th on the Yamina list of September 2019 Israeli legislative election and was not elected to the Knesset, as the alliance only won seven seats. Eliyahu was placed fourth on the Otzma Yehudit list in the 2022 Israeli legislative election, and became an MK. He became Minister for Jerusalem Affairs and Heritage on 29 December 2022 and resigned from the Knesset on 1 January 2023 as part of the Norwegian Law.

On 17 January 2025, Otzma Yehudit held a press conference at which it announced its intention to withdraw from the coalition if the government accepted the three-phase ceasefire proposal. The proposal was accepted, and Eliyahu resigned alongside the rest of the party's ministers when the ceasefire went into effect on 19 January 2025. His term ended on 21 January. Otzma Yehudit has stated its intention to rejoin the governing coalition if the deal does not result in a permanent ceasefire.

The cabinet approved Eliyahu's reappointment on 18 March and the Knesset approved it the next day.

== Political views ==
Eliyahu strongly opposes proposals for a two-state solution, calling the Green Line "fictitious". He supports full Israeli annexation of the West Bank and has called on Israel to "impose sovereignty on Judea and Samaria".

Eliyahu has criticized both police and the Israel Defense Forces (IDF) over alleged preferential treatment of Palestinians in the West Bank over settlers. In August 2023, he said, "the IDF, police and [security] services in the last three decades" had adopted "the world view of the Palestinian population, that automatically views the settlers as guilty".

Eliyahu has also called for the execution of Palestinian prisoners. In December 2023, he said that Israel "should fully occupy the Gaza Strip" after the war and build Israeli settlements there.

In July 2024, Eliyahu urged his supporters to protest at Sde Teiman detention camp against the Israeli military police's detention of nine Israeli soldiers suspected of abuse of a Palestinian prisoner; he then joined other right-wingers in illegally invading the camp.

After Hamas released the dead bodies of the Bibas Family, four Israelis taken as hostages; Eliyahu compared Hamas to Amalek, the biblical enemy of the Jews. Quoting the bible, Eliyahu wrote that Israel should "blot out the memory of Amalek from under the heavens".

In July 2025, during a famine caused by the Israeli blockade of the Gaza Strip, Eliyahu said: "there is no nation that feeds its enemies. The government is racing ahead for Gaza to be wiped out."

=== 2023 nuclear weapons comments controversy ===
In an interview with Radio Kol Berama during the Gaza war, Eliyahu said that the use of nuclear weapons was "one way" when discussing Israel's options in its ongoing military action in the Gaza Strip, adding, "The second way is to discover what is important to them, what scares them, what deters them... They are not afraid of death." He also endorsed the displacement of Gaza's Palestinian population, saying: "They can go to Ireland or deserts. The monsters in Gaza should find a solution by themselves." He also objected to humanitarian aid entering Gaza, saying, "we wouldn't hand the Nazis humanitarian aid" and that there were no "uninvolved civilians in Gaza". He said that anyone waving the flag of Palestine "shouldn't continue living on the face of the earth".

==== Public response ====
Eliyahu's statement immediately sparked controversy in and outside Israel. It was condemned by opposition leader and former prime minister Yair Lapid, who called it a "horrifying and insane remark" and urged that Eliyahu be fired. Eliyahu was also condemned by National Unity leader Benny Gantz and defense minister Yoav Gallant. Gerry Carroll, a member of the Northern Ireland Assembly, condemned Eliyahu's suggestion that Palestinians be transferred to Ireland.

Eliyahu defended his statements, saying that "any sensible person" knew they were "metaphorical", and maintained his support for a "powerful and disproportionate response to terrorism". Prime Minister Benjamin Netanyahu disavowed his comments and announced his suspension from cabinet meetings. However, Eliyahu took part in a cabinet telephone vote later that day. National security minister Itamar Ben-Gvir reportedly intervened on Eliyahu's behalf.

Eliyahu's remarks were included in the genocide case South Africa submitted to the International Court of Justice as an expression of genocidal intent against the Palestinian people.

=== 2025 erasing Gaza comments controversy ===
While serving as Israel’s Minister of Heritage, Eliyahu said during a July 2025 interview: "The government is rushing to erase Gaza, and thank God we are erasing this evil. All of Gaza will be Jewish." His comments were made amid increasing cases of malnutrition in Gaza and global warnings of starvation and famine.

==== Public response ====
Prime Minister Benjamin Netanyahu wrote on his X account: "Minister Amichay Eliyahu does not speak for the government I lead. He is not a member of the Security Cabinet that determines the conduct of the war."

== Personal life ==
Eliyahu is married and has six children. He lives in Rimonim, an illegal Israeli settlement in the Judean Hills east of Jerusalem on the West Bank of the Jordan River.
