= List of members of the nineteenth Knesset =

19th Knesset
←	18th	20th	→

Overview
- Legislative body: Knesset
- Jurisdiction: Israel
- Meeting place: Knesset building
- Term: 5 February 2013 – 8 December 2014
- Election: 22 January 2013
- Government: 33rd government

Knesset
- President: Shimon Peres; Reuven Rivlin (Note: Rivlin replaced Peres on 10 June 2014)
- Prime minister: Benjamin Netanyahu
- Speaker: Yuli Edelstein

The members of the 19th Knesset were elected on 22 January 2013, and sworn in on 5 February.

== Members of the Knesset ==
Alliance	Party	Name
Yesh Atid (19)		Yair Lapid • Shai Piron • Yael German • Meir Cohen • Ya'akov Peri • Ofer Shelah • Aliza Lavie • Yoel Razvozov • Adi Koll • Karin Elharar • Mickey Levy • Shimon Solomon • Ruth Calderon • Pnina Tamano-Shata • Rina Frenkel • Yifat Kariv • Dov Lipman • Boaz Toporovsky • Ronen Hoffman
Likud (18)		Benjamin Netanyahu • Gilad Erdan • Silvan Shalom • Israel Katz • Danny Danon • Moshe Ya'alon • Ze'ev Elkin • Tzipi Hotovely • Yariv Levin • Yuli Edelstein • Haim Katz • Miri Regev • Moshe Feiglin • Yuval Steinitz • Tzachi Hanegbi • Limor Livnat • Ofir Akunis • Gila Gamliel
Labor (15)		Shelly Yachimovich • Isaac Herzog • Eitan Cabel • Merav Michaeli • Yehiel Bar • Omer Bar-Lev • Stav Shaffir • Avishay Braverman • Erel Margalit • Itzik Shmuli • Mickey Rosenthal • Michal Biran • Nachman Shai • Moshe Mizrahi • Raleb Majadele
Yisrael Beiteinu (13)		Avigdor Lieberman • Yair Shamir • Uzi Landau • Sofa Landver • Yitzhak Aharonovich • Orly Levy • Faina Kirschenbaum • David Rotem • Robert Ilatov • Hamad Amar • Shimon Ohayon • Alex Miller • Leon Litinetski
Jewish Home (12)		Naftali Bennett • Uri Ariel • Nissan Slomiansky • Eli Ben-Dahan • Ayelet Shaked • Zvulun Kalfa • Avi Vartzman • Moti Yogev • Orit Strook • Yoni Chetboun • Shuli Mualem • Hillel Horowitz •
Shas (11)		Eli Yishai • Yitzhak Cohen • Meshulam Nahari • Amnon Cohen • Ya'akov Margi • David Azulai • Yitzhak Vaknin • Nissim Ze'ev • Avraham Michaeli • Yoav Ben-Tzur • Lior Edri
United Torah Judaism (7)	Agudat Yisrael (4)	Yaakov Litzman • Meir Porush • Eliezer Moses • Yisrael Eichler
United Torah Judaism (7)	Degel HaTorah (3)	Moshe Gafni • Uri Maklev • Ya'akov Asher
Hatnua (6)		Tzipi Livni • Amram Mitzna • Amir Peretz • Elazar Stern • Meir Sheetrit • David Tzur
Meretz (6)		Zehava Gal-On • Ilan Gilon • Nitzan Horowitz • Michal Rozin • Issawi Frej • Tamar Zandberg
Hadash (4)		Mohammad Barakeh • Hana Sweid • Dov Khenin • Afu Agbaria
Ra'am (3)		Ibrahim Sarsur • Masud Ghnaim • Taleb Abu Arar
Balad (3)		Jamal Zahalka • Haneen Zoabi • Basel Ghattas
Kadima (2)		Shaul Mofaz • Yuval Zellner
Ta'al (1)		Ahmad Tibi

=== Replacements ===
Date	Replacement	Party	Replacing	Notes
10 June 2014	Carmel Shama	Likud	Reuven Rivlin	Rivlin was elected President
22 June 2014	Yoav Ben-Tzur	Shas	Ariel Atias	Atias resigned from the Knesset to take a break from politics
6 August 2014	Alex Miller	Yisrael Beiteinu	Carmel Shama	Shama resigned after being appointed Israel's envoy to the OECD
5 November 2014	Leon Litinetski	Yisrael Beiteinu	Gideon Sa'ar	Sa'ar resigned from the Knesset to take a break from politics
14 December 2014	Raleb Majadele	Labor Party	Binyamin Ben-Eliezer	Ben-Eliezer resigned for health reasons
18 December 2014	Yuval Zellner	Kadima	Yisrael Hasson	Hasson resigned after being appointed Chairman of the Israel Antiquities Authority
1 January 2015	Lior Edri	Shas	Aryeh Deri	Deri resigned following the release of video footage in which Rabbi Ovadia Yosef verbally attacked him
16 February 2015	Hillel Horowitz	The Jewish Home	Uri Orbach	Orbach died on February 16, 2015
Source: Knesset website
