= Homat Torat Yisrael =

Homat Torat Yisrael חומת תורת ישראל
- Founded: 2026; 0 years ago
- Political position: Right-wing
- Religion: Haredi Judaism
- National affiliation: United Torah Judaism
- Knesset: 2 / 120

Homat Torat Yisrael (Hebrew: חומת תורת ישראל) is a Haredi Jewish political party in Israel formed in September 2026 following a split within United Torah Judaism.

== Background ==
The party split marks the first time since in 1992 that the party exists as a three-party alliance; Yitzhak Peretz was briefly part of the UTJ slate as a member of Moria.

A member of Shlomi Emunim, the UTJ faction led by Meir Porush, described the origins of the split as dating back to the Jerusalem 2008 mayoral election, with the Ger Hasidic dynasty campaigning against United Torah Judaism member Meir Porush.

== History ==
Each United Torah Judaism (UTJ) candidate was presented individually and voted upon at a meeting of the Moetzes Gedolei HaTorah held in early September 2026 in Bnei Brak. Yitzhak Goldknopf, Meir Porush, Eliakim Stark, as well as Ya'akov Tessler, had their positions approved. Fissures over the appointment of Moshe Roth, a member of the Sanz dynasty, to the fifth slot on the UTJ list ahead of the 2026 Israeli legislative election led to controversy within the party, with Ger dynasty figures calling for Roth's removal. Ger called for whoever held the fifth slot to align their votes with the central faction, which Sanz members refused. Ger has historically been the most powerful faction within UTJ.

Stark, representing the Belz dynasty, and Porush, as a member of Shlomi Emunim, announced in early September that they would run as a third party within the UTJ framework. The split took place ahead of the party list submission deadline for the 2026 Israeli legislative election. Members of Belz felt sidelined, as they were not given their designated funds. The split will give the new party direct access to funding units. The move was planned for over a year, with a shelf party utilised to form the new party. The party name was previously Manhigut Yehudit. Degel HaTorah reportedly assisted. Ger initially refused to approve the split, but acquiesed. The Central Faction was prepared to give a Sanz member the fifth slot on the slate, but it was too late.

A statement issued by Shlomi Emunim and Machzikei Hadat (the Belz faction) after they submitted the list described the split as "purely technical", emphasising that it remains part of UTJ. It will give the new party "greater political independence." Porush gave his rationale for the split in a late September interview, stating that "there was no choice." He discussed finding out that a large sum of money had been unilaterally withdrawn ahead of a municipal election in Bnei Brak, despite the Moetzes Gedolei HaTorah previously putting in place a system where party resources had to be approved by two individuals. Porush was made the signatory authority when that decision was made by the council. Porush withdrew similar amounts and discovered that his signatory authority had been canceled.

== Election results ==
Election	Leader	Votes	%	Seats	+/–	Government
2026	Meir Porush	with United Torah Judaism		2 / 120		TBA
