= Ya'akov Tessler =

Israeli politician

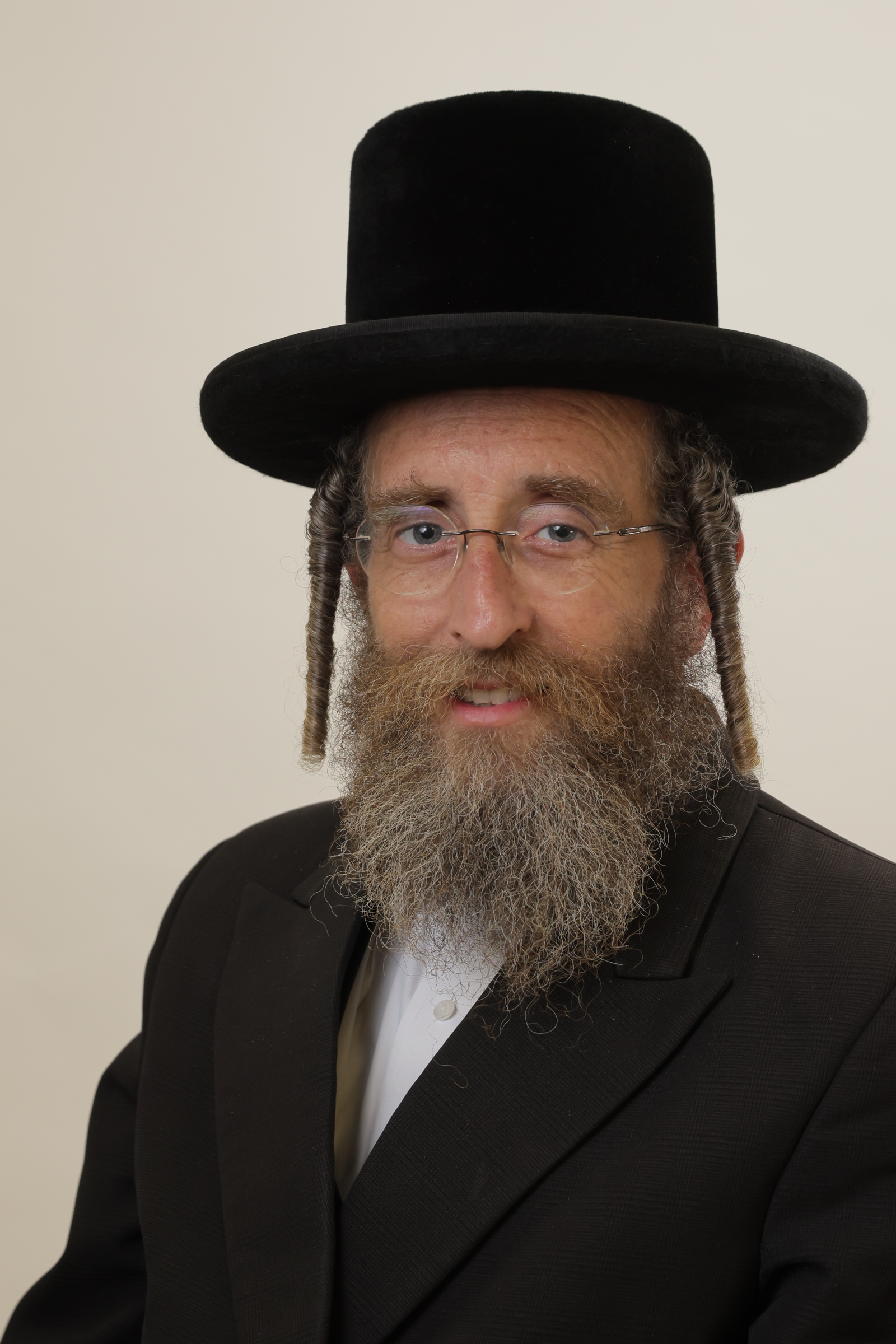
- Tessler in 2022

Faction represented in the Knesset
- 2019–2021: United Torah Judaism
- 2021: United Torah Judaism
- 2022–2025: United Torah Judaism
- 2025–2026: United Torah Judaism

Personal details
- Born: 27 June 1973 (age 53) Jerusalem, Israel

Yoel Ya'akov Tessler (Hebrew: יוֹאֵל יַעֲקֹב טֶסְלֶר; born 27 June 1973) is an Israeli politician who served as a member of the Knesset for the United Torah Judaism alliance.

== Biography ==
Tessler was born to Efraim and Haya Tessler in Jerusalem; his father was a rabbi and head of the Vizhnitz yeshiva in Har Nof. He grew up in the Sanhedria neighbourhood of Jerusalem, and was educated at the Vizhnitz and Tshebin yeshivas.

After marrying, Tessler moved to Ashdod, where he was elected to the city council in 2013 as a member of Agudat Yisrael, having been a member of the party's religious council. He also worked for the Hamodia newspaper as a project manager, and became assistant to Minister of Health Yaakov Litzman in 2015.

Tessler was placed thirteenth on the United Torah Judaism list for the 2013 Knesset elections, but failed to win a seat as the alliance won seven seats. He held the thirteenth place on the UTJ list for the 2015 elections, but was again unsuccessful as the party won six seats. Prior to the April 2019 Knesset elections, it was decided at the Agudat Yisrael conference that he would replace Eliezer Moses as the main representative of the Vizhnitz community, and he was subsequently placed fifth on the UTJ list. He was elected to the Knesset as the alliance won eight seats. He was placed fifth again for the September 2019 elections, and re-elected as UTJ won eight seats again. Placed eighth on the UTJ list for the March 2021 elections, he lost his seat as the alliance won seven seats. He regained his seat in April when Yaakov Litzman resigned his own seat under the Norwegian Law, but left the Knesset again in June when a new government was formed without United Torah Judaism and Litzman returned to the Knesset.

When Litzman resigned from the Knesset in June 2022 as part of a plea bargain for a fraud and breach of trust case, Tessler returned as his replacement.

Tessler served as the "Deputy Minister of Culture and Sports" until his resignation in June 2025.

Tessler submitted his resignation on 30 June 2025 and was replaced by Eliyahu Baruchi on 2 July 2025. Tessler returned to the Knesset two weeks later as a replacement for Yitzhak Pindrus.

Tessler, as a member of the State Control Committee, voted in October 2025 against the creation of a commission of inquiry on the 7 October attacks.
