= Yitzhak Pindrus =

Israeli politician

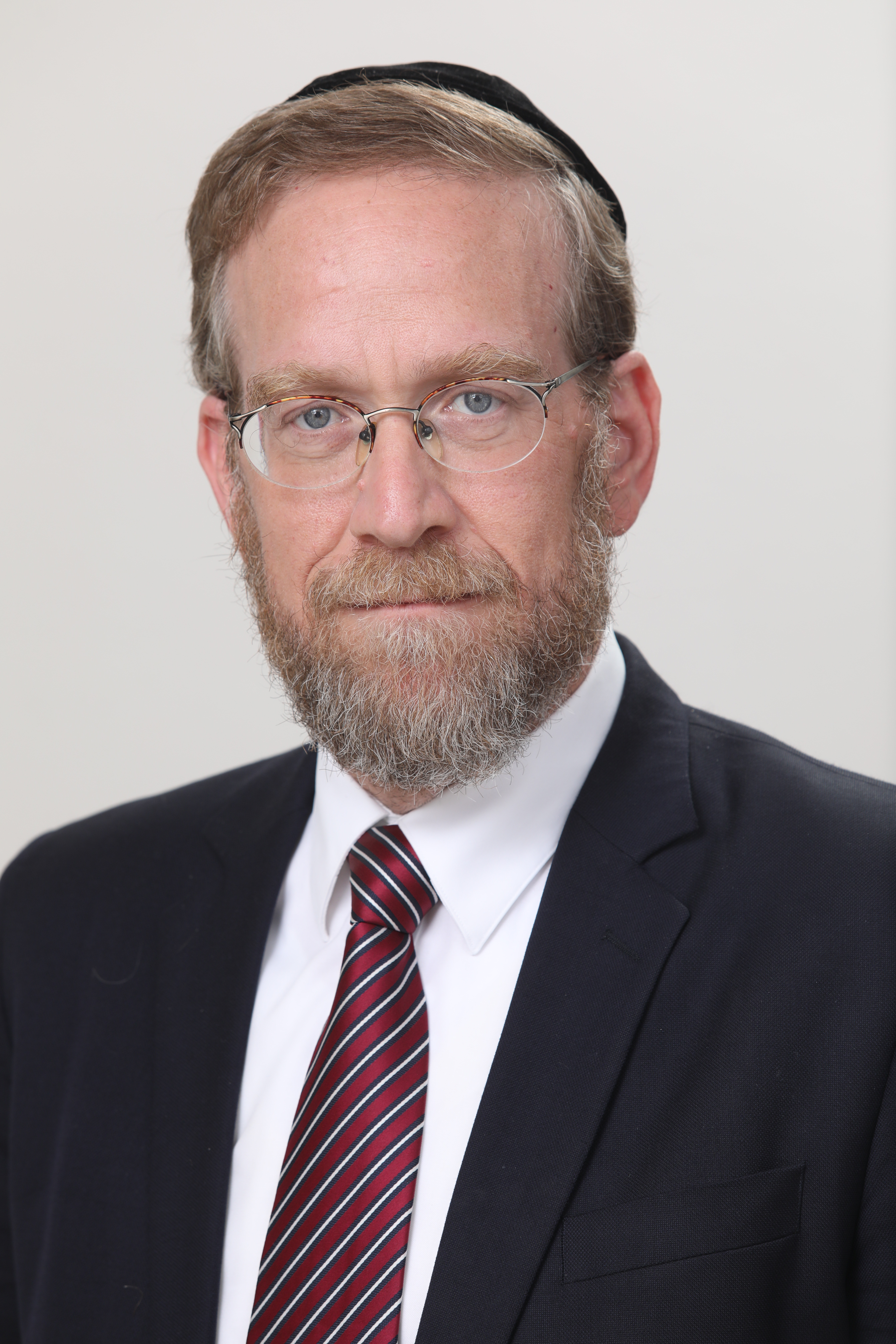
- Pindrus in 2019

Faction represented in the Knesset
- 2019: United Torah Judaism
- 2020–2022: United Torah Judaism
- 2023–2025: United Torah Judaism
- 2026–: United Torah Judaism

Personal details
- Born: 20 July 1971 (age 55) Jerusalem, Israel

Yitzhak Ze'ev Pindrus (Hebrew: יִצְחָק זְאֵב פִּינְדְרוֹס; born 20 July 1971) is an Israeli politician who serves as a member of the Knesset for United Torah Judaism. He also served in three spells between 2019 and 2025.

== Biography ==
Pindrus is the eldest son of American immigrants Moshe and Zelda, who moved to Israel and settled in Jerusalem. He attended Yeshivat Aderet Eliyahu, before marrying at the age of 19 and moving to the Beitar Illit settlement. Between 1991 and 1996 he worked as an advisor to Moshe Leibovitz, the head of Beitar Illit local council, before being elected deputy leader of the council in 1996 on behalf of Degel HaTorah.

In 2001 Pindrus ran for mayor of Beitar Illit, unseating the incumbent mayor Yehuda Gerlitz. Pindrus won by just 162 votes after he received 2,688 votes to Gerlitz's 2,526. In 2007, Pindrus lost the mayoral election to Meir Rubinstein. After his election defeat as mayor of Beitar Illit, Pindrus moved back to the Old City of Jerusalem, where he lives with his wife and six children. He is fluent in Hebrew, English, and Yiddish. He subsequently became a member of Jerusalem City Council in 2008, becoming deputy mayor and portfolio holder for sanitation and city improvements. He was eighteenth on the United Torah Judaism list (an alliance of Degel HaTorah and Agudat Yisrael) for the 2013 elections, but the alliance won only seven seats. He was twenty-second on the list for the 2015 Knesset elections, in which UTJ won six seats. In 2016 he became acting mayor of Jerusalem.

Prior to the 2018 local elections Pindrus resigned from Jerusalem City Council and as deputy mayor in order to contest the mayoral election in El'ad. However, he was subsequently barred from contesting the elections as he was not a permanent resident of the city. In the build-up to the April 2019 Knesset elections he was placed eighth on the UTJ list. He was subsequently elected to the Knesset as the faction won eight seats. However, he lost his seat in the September 2019 elections when UTJ was reduced to seven seats. He re-entered the Knesset in June 2020 as a replacement for Meir Porush, who had resigned under the Norwegian Law after being appointed to the cabinet.

He resigned in July 2025 and was replaced by Ya'akov Tessler. In January 2026, Chaim V'Chessed, an organization supporting new immigrants, appointed Pindrus as a Senior Governmental Liaison.

He returned to the Knesset on 21 January 2026, replacing Yisrael Eichler.

== Views and opinions ==
=== Conversion to Judaism through the IDF ===
Pindrus has publicly opposed the validity of conversion to Judaism conducted through an Israeli military program. In a panel on religion and state held by ITIM and the Kippah website held prior to the 2021 Israeli Knesset elections, Pindrus said that he did not recognize the Judaism of IDF Nativ graduates, despite their approval by the Chief Rabbinate. Pindrus later apologized on Israel's Channel 12 for his use of the term "shiksa" when referring to women who converted to Judaism through the IDF. Pindrus said the use of the term was not appropriate, although he continued to insist that these women were not Jewish, in accordance with halakha. Pindrus was reportedly criticized by MK Yair Lapid, who claimed that Pindrus' view was reflective of his ignorance of the commitment of these women to preserving Jewish life in Israel.

=== Women's prayer at the Western Wall ===
Pindrus reportedly helped organize a Haredi opposition campaign against Women of the Wall, a pluralistic Jewish prayer group at the Western Wall.

=== Death penalty for rapists ===
Pindrus has publicly expressed support for rapists to be "shot at point blank range."

=== LGBTQ rights ===
Pindrus is opposed to pride parades, saying he wanted to stop them from happening. Pindrus cited the Torah as the reason why he opposes homosexuality, claiming that the "decadence of forbidden relationships" is a bigger threat to Israel than the Islamic State, Hamas and Hezbollah. Pindrus walked out of a speech given by newly elected Speaker of the Knesset Amir Ohana in protest of Ohana mentioning his same-sex partner.
