= Yisrael Eichler =

Israeli politician

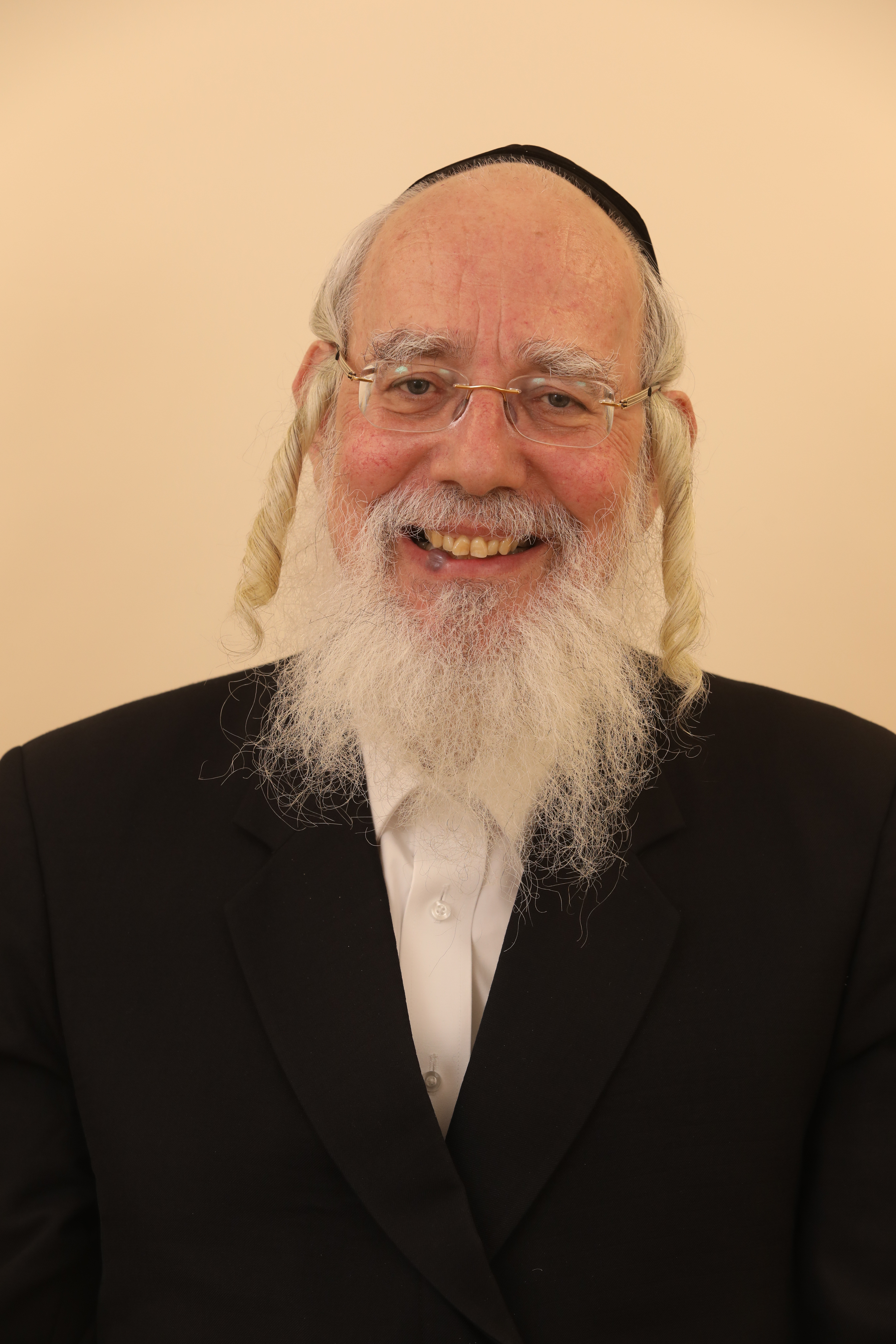
- Eichler in 2019

Faction represented in the Knesset
- 2003–2005: United Torah Judaism
- 2005: Agudat Yisrael
- 2011–2019: United Torah Judaism
- 2019: Agudat Yisrael
- 2019–2026: United Torah Judaism

Personal details
- Born: 27 March 1955 (age 71) Jerusalem, Israel

Yisrael Eichler (Hebrew: יִשְׂרָאֵל אַייכְלֶר; born 27 March 1955) is an Israeli politician. A member of Agudat Yisrael, he served as a member of the Knesset for the party and the United Torah Judaism alliance in various spells: from 2003 until 2005, from 2011 until 2019 and from 2019 until 2026.

== Biography ==
Born in Jerusalem, Eichler worked as an author and journalist. He became editor of the Haredi newspaper HaMahane HaHaredi in 1980, and in 1996 he became chairman of the Centre for Jewish Publicity.

In 2003 he was elected to the Knesset on the United Torah Judaism list, an alliance of Agudat Yisrael and Degel HaTorah. The alliance split in January 2005 and Eichler resigned from the Knesset on 23 February that year; his seat was taken by Shmuel Halpert.

As part of a seat rotation agreement within United Torah Judaism, Eichler returned to the Knesset on 6 February 2011 as a replacement for Meir Porush. He served as parliamentary group chairman until 2013. He was re-elected in the 2013 elections, and was placed sixth on the UTJ list for the 2015 elections, retaining his seat again as the party won six seats. Following a Supreme Court ruling that public mikveh facilities must allow use by followers of Conservative and Reform Judaism in February 2016, he compared Reform Jews to the "mentally ill".

He submitted his resignation as the head of the Labor and Welfare Committee on 15 July 2025.

Eichler was elected to the Rabbinical Judicial Appointments Committee on 23 July 2025.

Eichler resigned from the Knesset in January 2026, joined the government as the "deputy communications minister" and was replaced by Yitzhak Pindrus.

He was not expected to be included on the party's list for the 2026 Israeli legislative election and was replaced by Eliakim Stark, who was placed seventh on the party's list.

== Personal ==
Eichler is married and has 14 children. He lives in Jerusalem.
