= Binyamin Lipkin =

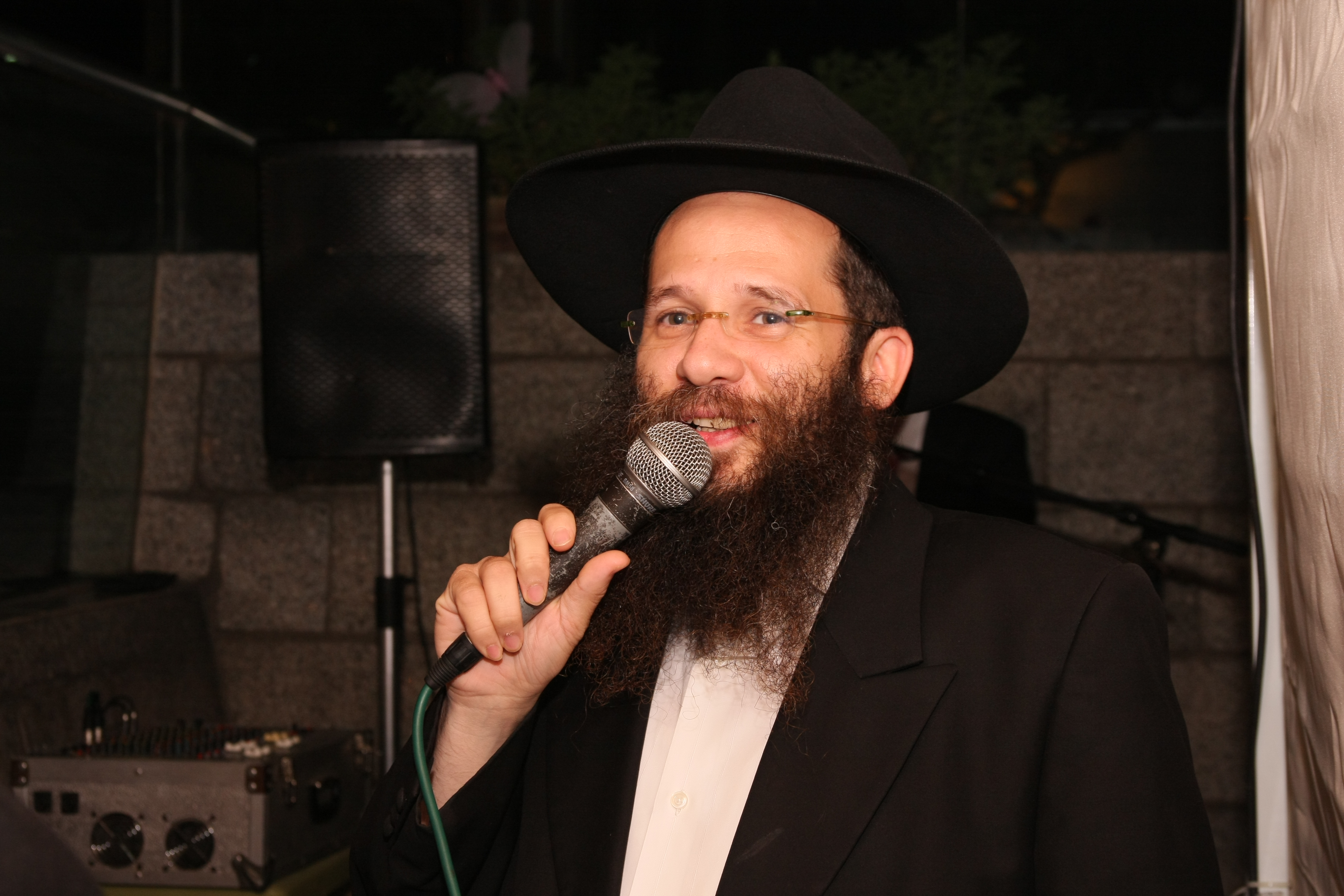
Binyamin Lipkin

Binyamin Lipkin (Hebrew: בנימין ליפקין; born 1974) is a Chabad, Hasidic author and newspaper editor.

== Career ==
Lipkin was the past editor for the weekly religious newspaper Bakehilah from 2000 to 2012. From 2012, Lipkin has held the post of editor at the religious daily Hamevaser.

In 2008, Lipkin was appointed to the public relations committee of the Haredi political party, United Torah Judaism.

In 2015, Lipkin's Haredi editorial practice of not publishing images of women was scrutinized by the Israeli and American press, following his decision to digitally remove the faces of female leaders from a group photo of European leaders.

== Books ==
- D'mus Hachasidus (1995)
- Al Hakavanos (1998)
- Shleimus Haaretz (1996)
- Eretz Avosaynu (1998)
- Shamil (1998)
- Chesbono Shel Olam (2000) - This book documents the preparations taken by the Lubavitcher Rebbe, Rabbi Menachem Mendel Schneerson to prepare for his death.
- B'chol Baysi Ne'eman Hu (2011)
