= Shelf party =

The phrase shelf party (Hebrew: מפלגת מדף) refers to a political party that is legally registered but not active, and can be purchased to convert it into a new party. Shelf parties are widely used in Israeli politics to bypass lengthy registration processes.

One instance is Homat Torat Yisrael, which is a faction within United Torah Judaism which was formed in September 2026 using an inactive party. Sometimes, these parties keep their original name after the takeover; New Right was officially known as "Tzalash", which is the name of the shelf party which was used. Otzma Yehudit used Eretz Yisrael Shelanu as a shelf party in September 2026 to gain more funding units. The party has used shelf parties previously.

A shelf party is also used to allow people to legally switch their parties after the election. Examples for the latter include Democratic Choice in 2020 and Ahi in 2019.

== See also ==
- Fake party
- Taxi party
