= Yaakov Litzman =

Israeli politician

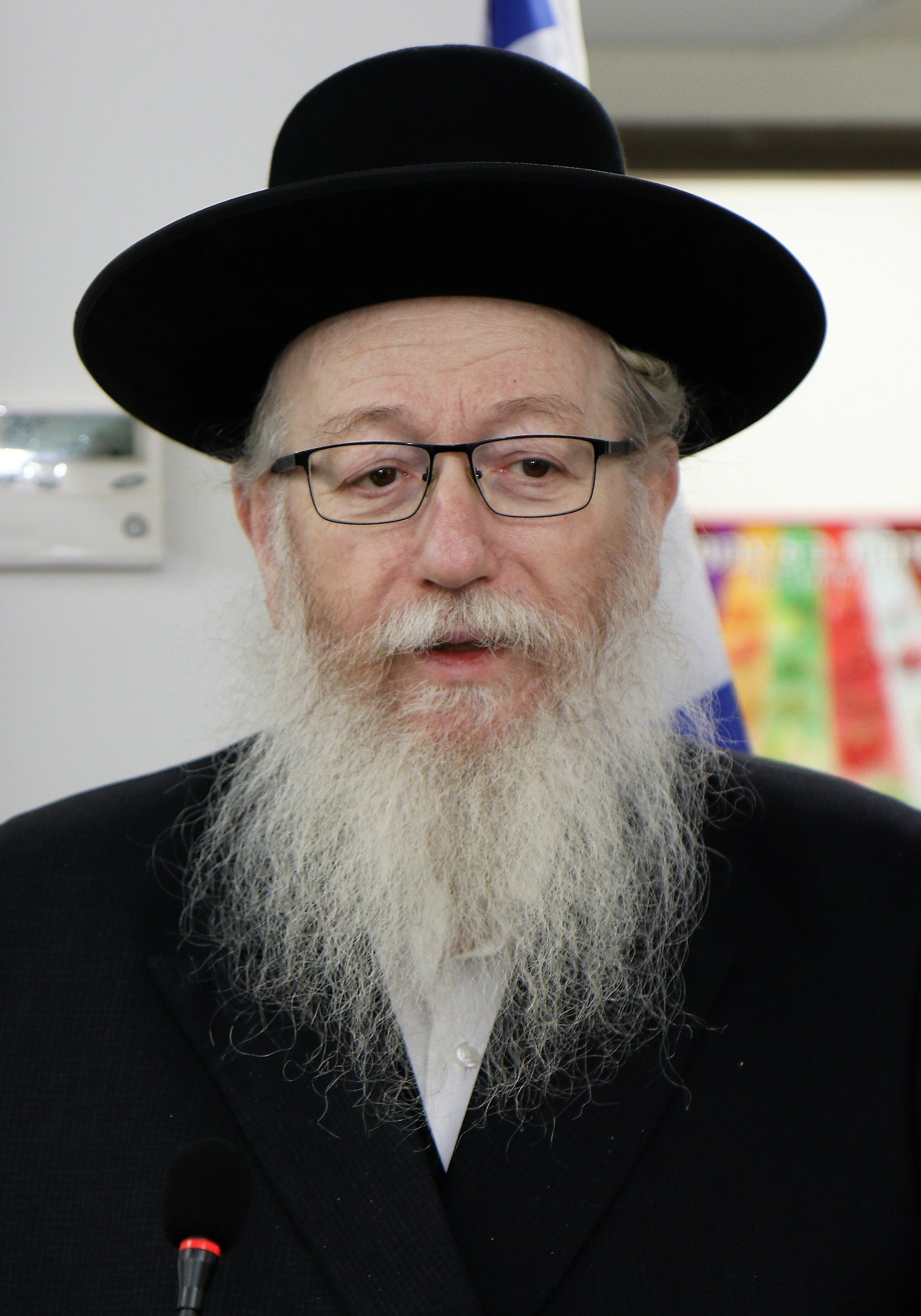

Ministerial roles
- 2015–2017: Minister of Health
- 2019–2020: Minister of Health
- 2020–2021: Minister of Housing & Construction

Faction represented in the Knesset
- 1999–2005: United Torah Judaism
- 2005–2006: Agudat Yisrael
- 2006–2008: United Torah Judaism
- 2008–2009: Agudat Yisrael
- 2009–2021: United Torah Judaism
- 2021–2022: United Torah Judaism

Personal details
- Born: 2 September 1948 (age 78) Allied-occupied Germany

Yaakov Noach Litzman (Hebrew: יַעֲקֹב נָח לִיצְמָן; born 2 September 1948) is an Israeli former politician and government minister. A follower of the Ger Hasidic dynasty, he headed Agudat Yisrael, part of the United Torah Judaism alliance, in the Knesset. He previously served as Minister of Health and Minister of Housing and Construction. He was a Member of Knesset from 1999–2022.

== Biography ==
Litzman was born to Lithuanian Jewish Holocaust survivors from Poland, in a displaced persons camp in Allied-occupied Germany. When he was two years old, the family immigrated to the United States, settling in Brooklyn, first in the East New York section and then to the Borough Park, where he grew up. In 1966, at age 17, he immigrated to Israel, and continued his Torah studies.

Litzman is married, has five children, and lives in Jerusalem.

== Pedagogic career ==
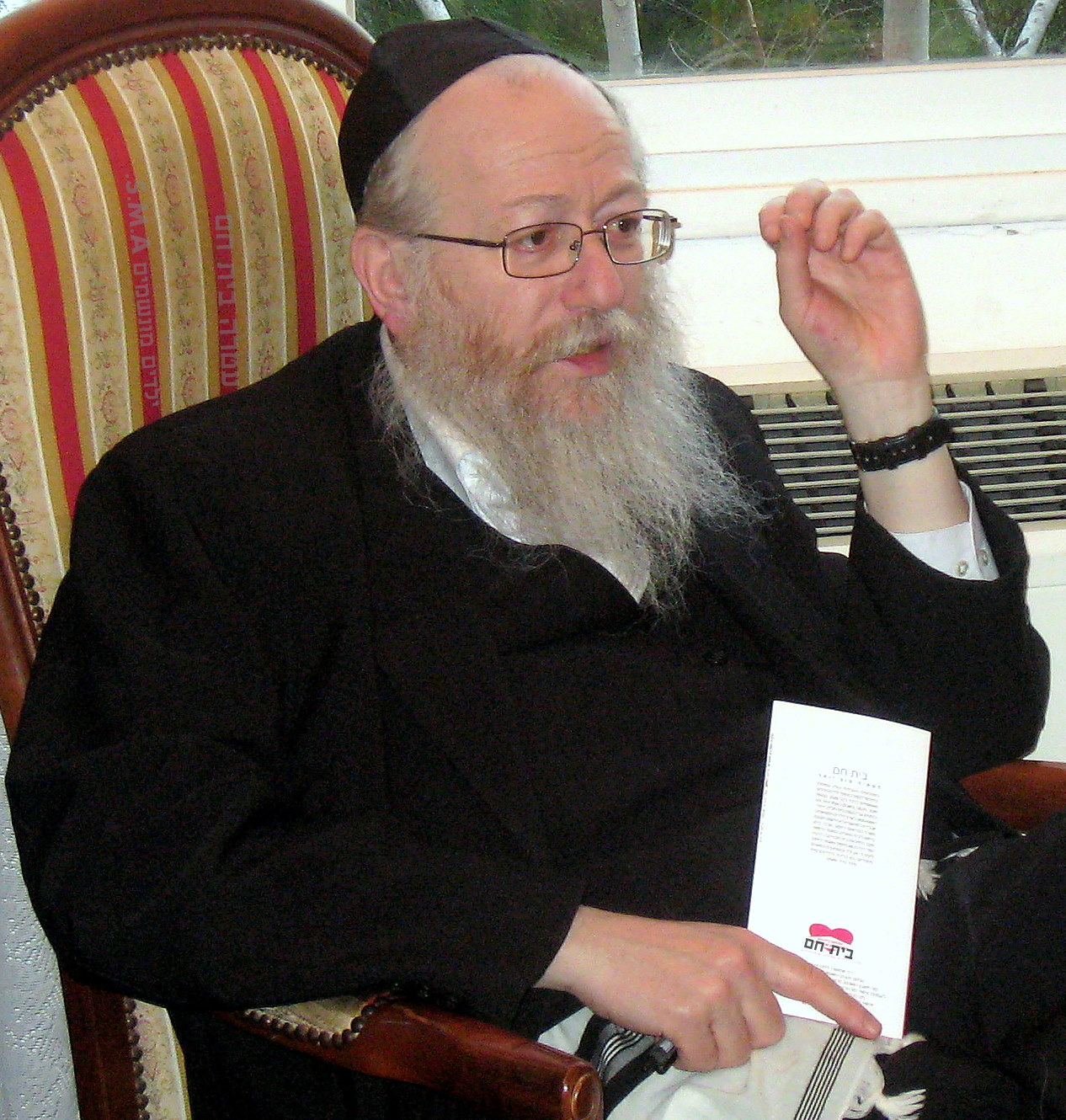
Litzman in 2010

His first job was as principal of the Hasidic Beis Yaakov girls' school in Jerusalem.

== Political career ==
=== Early days ===
Litzman became active in politics under the guidance of the then-Gerrer Rebbe, Rabbi Simcha Binem Alter. Over time, Litzman became known as the rebbe's right-hand man, a role he continues under the present Gerrer Rebbe, Rabbi Yaakov Arye Alter.

Litzman was an assistant to the Deputy Minister of Labor and Social Welfare, Moshe Ze'ev Feldman until 1989. He was also an advisor to Member of Knesset Avraham Yosef Shapira.

=== Member of the Knesset ===
In 1999 he joined the Agudat Yisrael faction of the United Torah Judaism list for the Knesset elections that year. He was subsequently elected, and became Chairman of the Finance Committee.

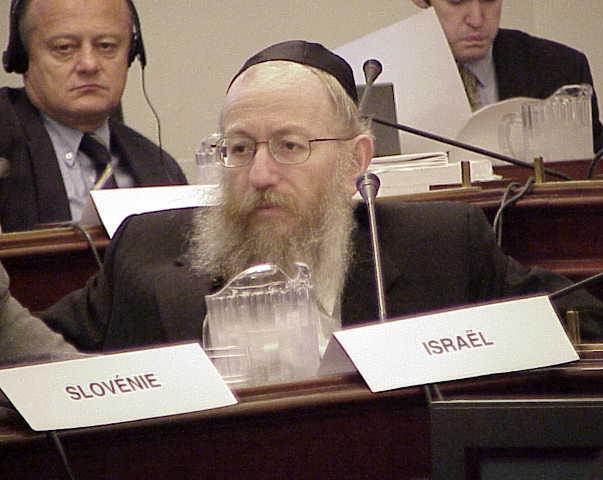
Litzman at the second OECD conference as Chairman of the Finance Committee

In the years 2001-2003 and again in the years 2005-2007, he served as the chairman of the Knesset Finance Committee. During his tenure, he initiated several laws, including the Law on Unique Cultural Educational Institutions and the law granting exemption to synagogues, mosques, churches and khalwats from paying lease fees to the Israel Land Administration. The House Committee voted in early March 2007 to remove Litzman as the head of the committee, which was pending approval by the Finance Committee.

=== Member of government coalition ===
In the elections of 2009, Litzman was placed first on the list of United Torah Judaism, however, after being elected, he was not given the chairmanship of the finance committee as before, due to opposition from members of his faction. Instead he was appointed Deputy Minister of Health. At the same time, he ceased to be the chairman of the United Torah Judaism faction, and was replaced by Member of Knesset Menachem Eliezer Moses.

In 2015 he returned to serve as Deputy Minister of Health (Acting Minister). In August 2015, following a petition filed by the Yesh Atid party, the Supreme Court of Justice ruled that Litzman could not serve as a deputy minister in the capacity of a minister and must be appointed as a minister. Following this, the Council of Torah Elders of Agudath Israel decided to change a previous decision of the council according to which members of the Knesset on behalf of Agudat Israel would not hold ministerial positions and allowed Litzman to be appointed Minister of Health. As a result, the government decided to appoint him Minister of Health.

In 2017, Litzman announced his resignation from the government, due to the continuation of Israel Railways work on Shabbat. In 2018, the Knesset approved an amendment making it possible for Litzman to return to the position of Deputy Minister of Health. He officially returned to serve as Minister of Health in 2019.

In 2020 he was appointed at his request to the Minister of Construction and Housing.

In 2021, Litzman announced his retirement and desire to run in forthcoming elections.

In 2022, following the plea agreement in the Malka Leifer case, Litzman announced that he was resigning from the Knesset.

=== Minister of health ===
In 2016 Litzman ordered Israel to reinstate fluoridation of Israeli drinking water. Fluoride had been added to tap water since the 1970s, but removed by his predecessor in the Ministry of Health Yael German. Litzman stated it was "important act to advance dental health in Israel.” German criticized him and petitioned the Supreme Court to stop the reinstatement. He also rescinded German's order to cancel free dental care for children and expanded dental coverage.

Litzman opposed Brain Death Law and stated he believed patients should be declared dead only when their heart stops beating. In 2009 he intervened to give a dying toddler medication contrary to a doctor's recommendation.

Litzman called for women be separated from men in the psychiatric hospitals.

In 2010 he approved measures to fund invitro-fertilization and ease access to egg donors, with the stipulation that the egg recipient would be allowed to ascertain the donor’s religion.

On multiple occasion, Litzman would make surprise visits to hospitals to check on their efficiency and conditions. In one instance, the Jerusalem Post reported he intervened in a hospital to sit with a 100-year-old man until hospital staff treated him. In a 2010 visit to Kfar Shaul Mental Health Center, he ordered the ministry to find a solution to lack of space.

During his tenure, mental health benefits were transferred from the clinics to the health funds. In 2019, in light of long waits for treatment, there was an exchange of accusations between the Ministries of Health and Finance regarding an additional budget that was supposed to reach the Ministry of Health for the budgeting of the reform.

In 2016, Litzman announced reforms to hospital cafeterias allowing for discount food stores such as Cofix to operate on the premises. Food vending machines were installed at Tel Aviv Sourasky Medical Center.

In 2016 he opposed government recognition for mikvahs run by the Reform and Conservative movements.

In 2016 he voted against a series of gay rights bills which included allowing gay civil unions, enabling gay couples to adopt, prohibiting conversion therapy, and giving benefits to gay partners of IDF soldiers killed in action. He also voted down a bill to add gender identity to the list of hate crimes.

In 2016, Litzman began a campaign against junk food, using McDonald's as an example. McDonald's countered by stating that for the past ten years, they have been refining their menus and ingredients to make their food healthier. He also campaigned against tobacco, but in 2017, opposed a law requiring cigarette warning labels. In 2017, investigative journalist Haim Rivlin claimed the reason was that HaModia newspaper, founded by Agudat Israel members, of which Litzman is affiliated, published advertisements on behalf of the tobacco companies.

During the 2018 measles outbreak, Litzman was a stanch support of vaccines, calling them the "cornerstone of the prevention of dangerous infectious diseases." He called for taking measures against parents who refuse to vaccinate their children before sending them to school.

In the runup to the 2021 Israeli legislative election, it was announced that Moshe Gafni would replace Litzman as leader of UTJ in the following Knesset. After the election and with the swearing in of the Thirty-sixth government of Israel, UTJ found itself in opposition for the first time since 2015. For the first time in his political career, he was not chair of a Knesset committee, a minister or deputy minister, or leader of a party. He announced in December 2021 that he would not run for reelection to the Knesset, citing his advanced age.

Litzman resigned from the Knesset in June 2022, as part of a plea agreement in which he admitted criminally obstructing the extradition of convicted pedophile Malka Leifer.

==== Coronavirus pandemic ====
When coronavirus came to Israel in 2020, Litzman supported social distancing and masks. "The mask is an important measure for personal protection, for preventing the spread of the virus and becoming infected with it," Litzman stated. In the early days of the pandemic, debate raged in Israel as to whether the government would ban public protests and attending synagogues, with religious Jews, like Litzman, complaining that they were targeted unfairly, while secular protesters were allowed to congregate. Litzman was accused of violating his own rules when he allegedly attending group prayer services just days before he was diagnosed with COVID-19 himself. He was the first Israeli elected official to be diagnosed with COVID-19. He advocated the use of COVID-19 vaccines. He was criticized by fellow elected officials and the many in the public for the Health Ministry's handling of the pandemic.

== Controversy ==
The Zionist Federation of Australia president Jeremy Leibler calling the promotion of Litzman "a slap in the face to the Australian Jewish Community, the Australian people, the community of Australian [immigrants] in Israel, and, most shockingly, to the survivors of Malka Leifer's alleged abuse". With the Thirty-fifth government of Israel, Litzman resigned from the Knesset as part of the Norwegian Law, and was sworn in as Minister of Housing and Construction. On 13 September 2020, Litzman resigned as Minister of Housing and Construction, in protest over a nationwide coronavirus shutdown scheduled to begin over the High Holidays of Rosh HaShanah, Yom Kippur, and Sukkot, beginning on the first night on Rosh HaShanah, 19 September, for at least three weeks. On 18 November, he was re-appointed as Minister of Housing and Construction.

In a February 2016 discussion in the Knesset about Israeli health authorities being more sensitive towards LGBT people, Litzman compared LGBT people to the sinners who danced around the Golden Calf.

Litzman was criticized over statements that seemed to serve the interests of the tobacco companies, including hindering efforts to curb cigarette ads. In his first tenure as deputy health minister (2009-2013), Litzman opposed warning labels and stickers despite their role in reducing the habit in other countries. Litzman argued that the images of dirty lungs and teeth aimed at discouraging children and youth from smoking were "unaesthetic."

In his second tenure (starting 2015), Litzman was criticized for opposing legislation prohibiting tobacco advertising in newspapers. Litzman argued that such laws would bankrupt newspapers, which rely on the advertising revenue. It was pointed out that Litzman had a conflict of interest due to his close association with ultra-Orthodox publications (Hamodia in particular) that rely on revenue from tobacco ads. Litzman had a conflict of interest concerning Hamodia, due to the fact that it is published by his Agudat Yisrael party and employs his wife. A bill was finally agreed upon after other MKs threatened to vote against a bill restricting retail operations on Shabbat and Jewish religious holidays. However, Litzman stipulated that he would only agree on condition that the ban did not include printed publications.

Litzman made a plea deal on 27 January 2022 admitting to breach of trust for using his former position as deputy health minister to obstruct the extradition to Australia of Malka Leifer, who was accused and later convicted in the Adass Israel School sex abuse scandal. He had attempted to obtain false psychiatric evaluations that would deem Leifer unfit to face trial in Australia. The plea deal required Litzman to pay a nominal fine and to resign from the Knesset, which he did on 1 June 2022. In June 2022, Litzman was replaced as head of UTJ by Yitzhak Goldknopf.

Eli Beer, president of Israel's United Hatzalah ambulance service, criticized Litzman for refusing to allow Hatzalah's 6,000 volunteers to play a role in assisting the Health Ministry and Magen David Adom to conduct virus tests. Litzman claimed Hatzalah staff were less professional.
