= Ya'akov Asher =

Israeli politician

- יעקב אשר
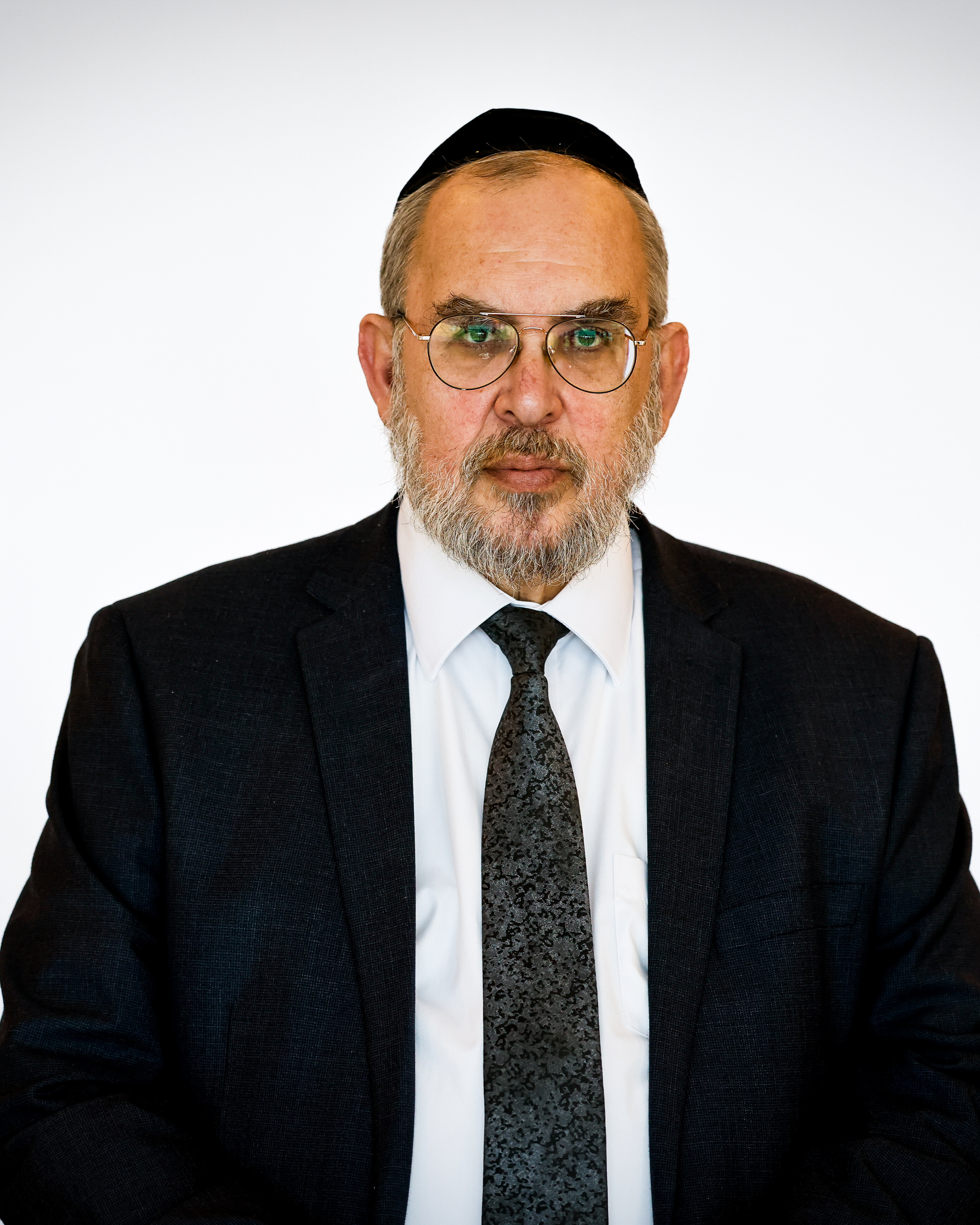
- Asher in 2026

Faction represented in the Knesset
- 2013–2015: United Torah Judaism
- 2016–: United Torah Judaism

Other roles
- 2008–2013: Mayor of Bnei Brak

Personal details
- Born: 2 July 1965 (age 61) Ramat Gan, Israel
- Party: Degel HaTorah
- Spouse: Miriam Asher
- Children: 7

Ya'akov Asher (Hebrew: יַעֲקֹב אָשֵׁר, Yiddish: יעקב אשר; born 2 July 1965) is an Israeli Haredi rabbi and politician who has served as a member of the Knesset for the United Torah Judaism alliance since 2016. He has also served as the head of the alliance and as the head of the Degel HaTorah party since 2026. He previously served as a member of the Knesset between 2013 and 2015, and was also the thirteenth mayor of Bnei Brak, having taken office in 2008.

== Biography ==
Asher was born and raised in Ramat Gan to Aharon and Tova Asher. He studied at the Mishkan Yaakov Yeshiva in Haifa, the Rabbi Amiel Yeshiva in Tel Aviv, and the Grodno Yeshiva in Ashdod. He later continued his studies at the Beit Yehuda Kollel in Bnei Brak. Asher served for several months in the IDF under the Shlav B program.

== Political career ==
=== Local government activities ===
In 1990, Asher began working at the Bnei Brak municipality, initially assisting Deputy Mayor Eliyahu Suissa. In 1992, he became the manager of Mayor Yerachmiel Boyar's office. Between 1996 and 1998, he assisted the municipality's CEO and later managed the Education Department.

Ahead of the first elections in El'ad in September 2000, Asher relocated to the city and ran as the leader of the "Chen Together" list affiliated with United Torah Judaism. He competed against the appointed council head Tzuriel Krispel representing Shas. Asher received 914 votes, losing to Krispel, who garnered 974 votes. He joined the council and served as Deputy Council Head. Krispel attempted to remove him from the council, claiming Asher did not reside in Elad and worked for Bnei Brak Municipality, but the move was blocked by a court ruling. Asher worked to allocate buildings for institutions affiliated with United Torah Judaism and took legal action on several occasions to achieve this.

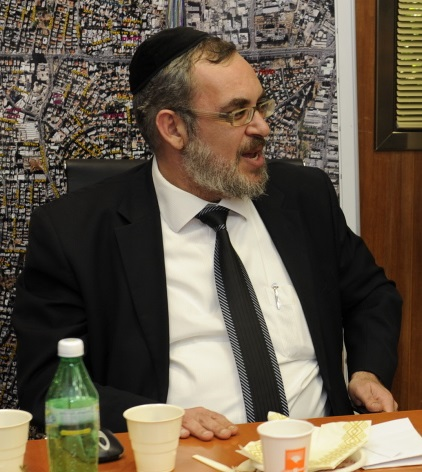
Asher as mayor of Bnei Brak, 2011

In 2003, Asher returned to the Bnei Brak municipality and was elected to the council as the first representative of Degel HaTorah on its joint list with Agudat Yisrael, "The Central Torah List." He served as Deputy Mayor Yeshayahu Frankenthal and was in charge of the Engineering Department. Ahead of the 2008 Bnei Brak municipal elections, Asher was selected as Degel HaTorah's candidate for mayor, as part of a rotation agreement between Degel HaTorah and Agudat Yisrael. Asher was declared mayor without elections being held, as he was the candidate from the sole list running, "The Central Torah List," which included representatives from United Torah Judaism, Shas, and The Jewish Home.

=== National-level activities ===
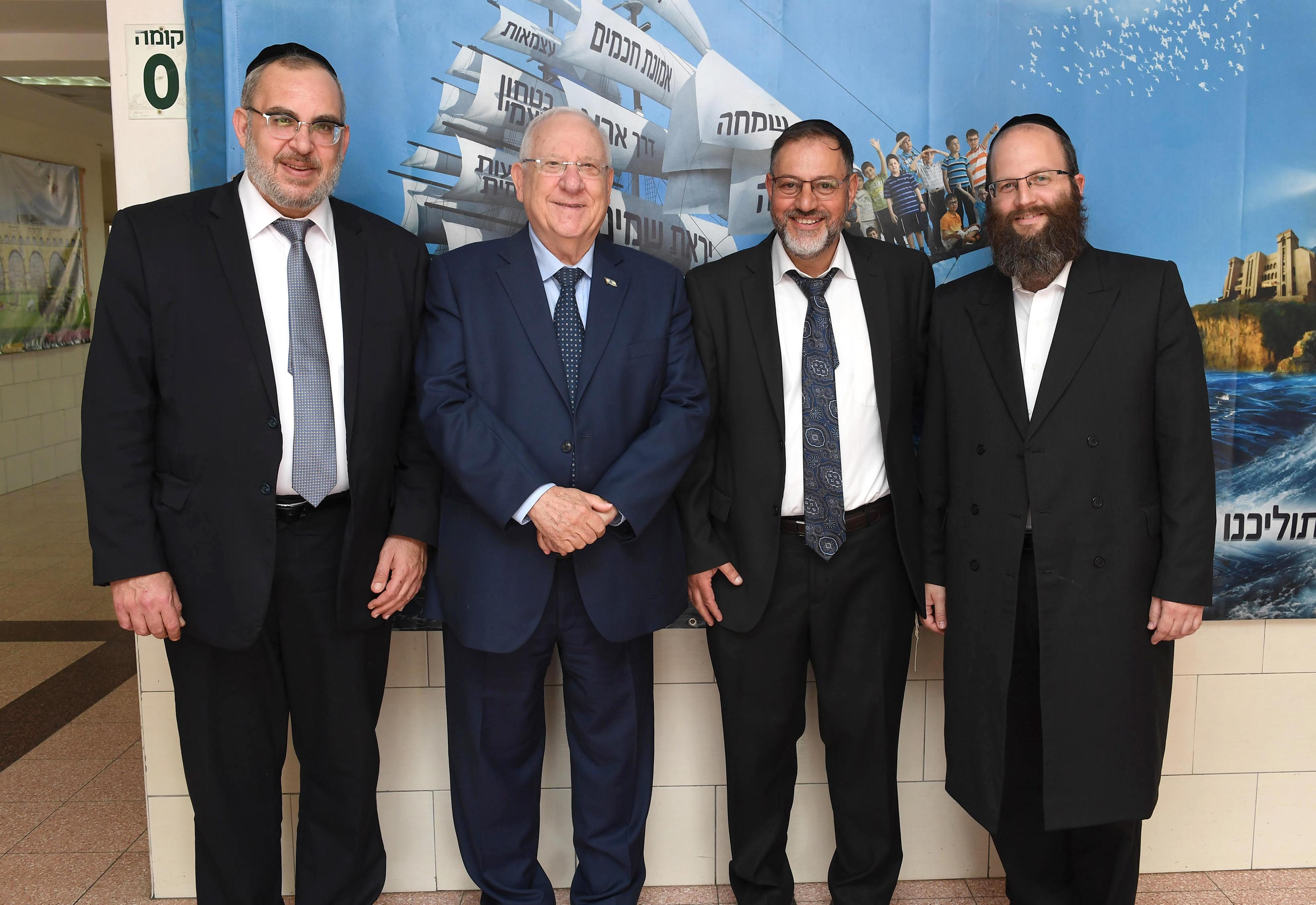
Asher (left) with President Reuven Rivlin, August 2017.

Ahead of the elections for the 19th Knesset, Asher was placed seventh on the United Torah Judaism list as the third representative of Degel HaTorah and was elected to the Knesset. Ahead of the elections for the 20th Knesset, he was again placed seventh on the list but did not enter the Knesset, as United Torah Judaism received only six seats. He was subsequently appointed as the Secretary General of Degel HaTorah. On 24 May 2016, following the resignation of Deputy Education Minister Meir Porush under the "Small Norwegian Law" (Section 42G of the Basic Law: The Knesset), Asher entered the Knesset in his place.

Ahead of the elections for the 21st Knesset, Asher was placed sixth on the United Torah Judaism list. The list won eight seats in the elections, and he entered the Knesset, serving as the chair of the United Torah Judaism faction.

Since 2016, Yaakov Asher has been a member of the public council of NATAL, an organization providing psychological support for trauma victims of national conflicts.

Ahead of the elections for the 24th Knesset, he was placed fifth on the list and entered the Knesset.

On 28 February 2022, Asher was appointed as Deputy Speaker of the Knesset.

In 2023 Asher and Moshe Gafni submitted a bill that would have banned Proselytizing of Christianity in Israel.

He currently serves in the 25th Knesset as the chair of the Interior and Environment Committee.

In September 2026, Asher became the chairman of Degel HaTorah as well as the head of United Torah Judaism following Moshe Gafni's ouster.

== Personal life ==
Asher's brothers are Rabbi Pinchas Asher and Rabbi Avraham Asher (who died in 2019).

Rabbi Yaakov Asher is married to Miriam-Miri Asher, and they have seven children. He resides in Bnei Brak.
