= Party funding in Israel =

Party funding in Israel refers to the financial aspects of political competition in Israel, encompassing the raising and expenditure of funds by political parties. This funding is primarily directed towards national (Knesset) and municipal election campaigns, as well as the day-to-day operations of party organizations. The prominence of political parties in Israel's political landscape can be traced back to the Yishuv, the pre-state Jewish community in Eretz Israel, where they emerged as the primary political entities.

== Spending on politics ==
Although it is widely believed that Israel is "the most expensive democracy per voter in the world" authors rarely provide summaries of the overall expenses for party competition. In 1960 Alexander Heard mentioned more than US-$5.00 per voter. Arnold Heidenheiomer (1963) allocated an index value of 20.50 (both the highest values in their sample). In 1984 Howard Penniman reported US-$4.34 per citizen (much lower than Venezuela's US-$20.35). Based on data for the 1990s a German study ranked Israel together with Austria, Italy and Japan among the top spenders on party politics.

For the period between 1973 and 1992, Mendilow assumes a relative decline of ongoing expenses as compared to the escalation of campaign spending. Between 1973 and 1984, current operations of parties amounted to US-$2.8 and US-$7.0 million. If the legal spending limit was equal to actual campaign spending, US-$26 million per year were needed for current operations in 1989.

Both in election and non-elections years, parties incur different kinds of expenditure. During non-election periods, most party funds are spent on salaries for paid party workers and expenses for permanent offices. Over time, the outlay for public meetings in Israel has declined, whereas the importance of advertising and media has grown considerably. However, on election day, Israeli parties continue to spend on taxis to bring voters to the polls and to pay for party workers' food and time. "Such expenses can amount to between 25 and 33 per cent of campaign expenses."

== Sources of revenue ==
Party membership used to be a major source of funding when a high percentage of the adult population were members of a political party. However, just like in other democracies, party membership has decreased. In 1969 still 18 per cent of the citizens retained a membership, in 1990 there were roughly just 7 per cent left. The share of party income from membership was less than 10 per cent of the total then.

"Individual contributions to general elections are permitted as long as they originate from donors who are Israeli citizens and residents above the age of eighteen," provided the donation does not exceed NIS 50,000 and it is not anonymous. A report in Haaretz contends that somehow non-residents made political contributions in 2015.

In 1969, Israel had started to provide public funding for party activity. This source of revenue has increased its importance ever since. Between 1975 and 1984, public subsidies had covered about 85 per cent of declared annual routine expenses.

== Regulation of money in politics ==
Public law stipulates a variety of rules for the flow of money in politics. Israeli laws restrict both donations and expenses. Most of the rules concern political parties. However, as candidates run their own campaigns in party primaries, these under surveillance for 30 days, too. For candidates in primaries donations by foreign individuals are permitted. Applicable are the Political Parties (Financing) Law, 5733-1973, and the Parties Law, 5752-1992.

== See also ==
- Campaign finance
- Funding unit
- Party subsidies
- Political party funding
- Politics of Israel

== Sources ==
=== Bibliography ===
- Gutman, Emanuel: 'Israel', in: Journal of Politics, vol. 25, no. 4, 1963, pp. 703–717.
- Doron, Gideon: 'Party Financing', in: Arian, Asher/ Shamir, Michal (eds.), The Election in Israel, 1984, New Brunswick and Oxford: Transaction Books, 1986, pp. 37–53.
- Mendilow, Jonathan: 'Party Financing in Israel. Experience and Experimentation', in: Alexander, Herbert E. (ed.): Comparative Political Finance in the 1980s, Cambridge: Cambridge University Press, 1989, pp. 124–152.
- Mendilow, Jonathan: 'Public Party Funding and Party Transformation in Multi-Party Systems', in: Comparative Political Studies, vol. 25, no. 1, 1992, pp. 90–117.
- Kalchheim, Chaim/ Rosevitch, Shimon: 'The Financing of Elections and Parties', in: Elazar, Daniel J./ Sandler, Shmuel (eds.): Who's the Boss in Israel. Israel at the Polls, 1988-89, Detroit: Wayne State University, 1992, pp. 212–229.
- Mendilow, Jonathan: 'Public Party Funding and the Schemes of Mice and Men', in: Party Politics, vol. 2, no. 3, 1996, pp. 329–354.
- Hofnung, Menachem: 'The Public Purse and the Private Campaign: Political Finance in Israel', in: Journal of Law and Society, vol. 23, no. 1, March 1996, pp. 132–148; available at: .
- Mendilow, Jonathan: 'Public Campaign Funding and Party System Change: The Israeli Experience', in: Israel Studies Forum, vol. 19, Fall 2003, pp. 115–122.
- Levush, Ruth: Campaign Finance: Israel, Washington DC: Library of Congress, 2009, available at: .

=== External links ===
- 2003 Political Party Finance Database – International IDEA, Strömsborg, Sweden
- 2012 Political Party Finance Database – International IDEA, Strömsborg, Sweden
