= Avraham Yosef Shapira =

Israeli politician and businessman

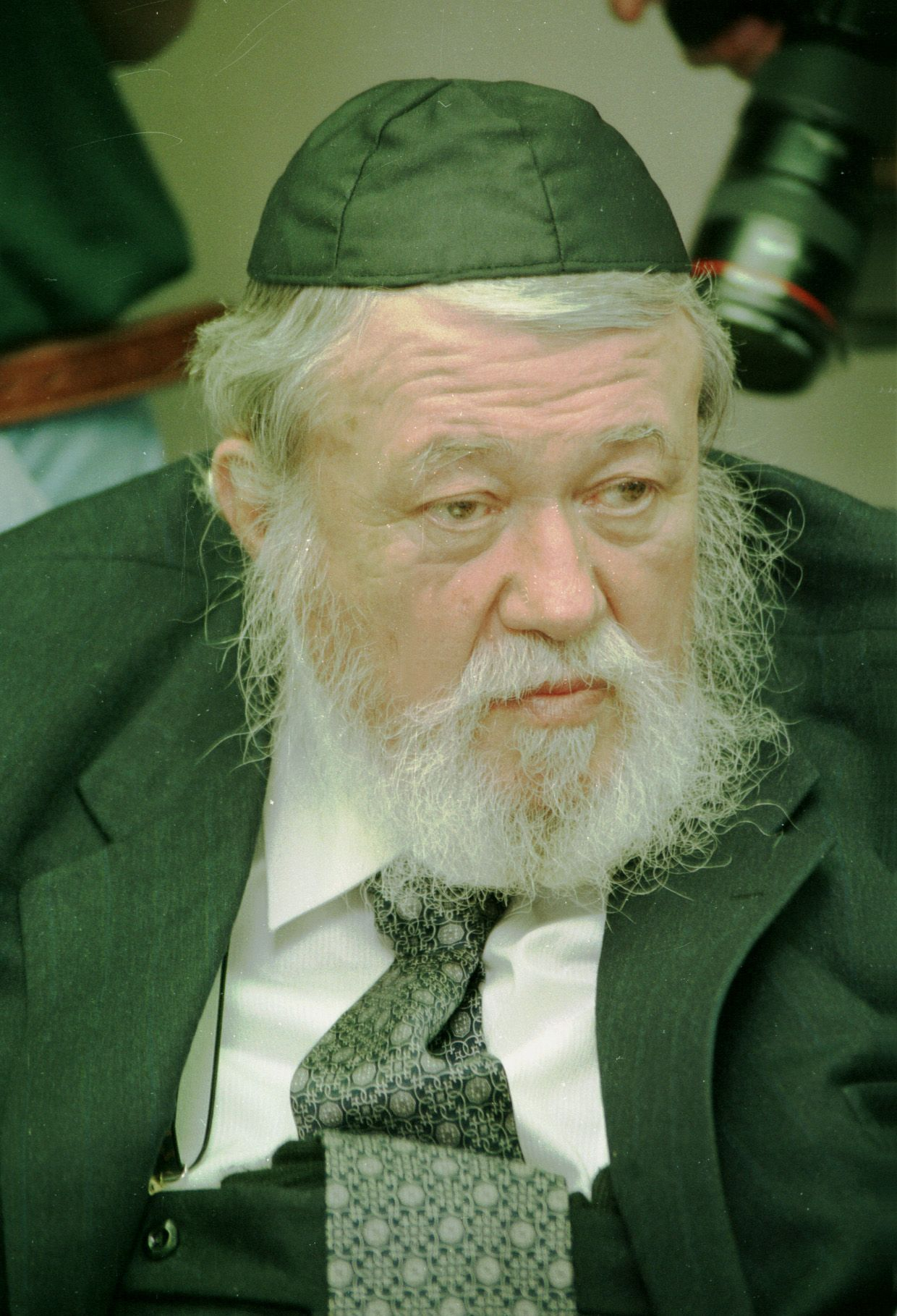
- Shapira in 1996

Faction represented in the Knesset
- 1981–1988: Agudat Yisrael
- 1992–1996: United Torah Judaism
- 1996: Agudat Yisrael

Personal details
- Born: 2 March 1921 Romania
- Died: 26 June 2000 (aged 79)

Avraham Yosef Shapira (Hebrew: אברהם יוסף שפירא; 2 March 1921 – 26 June 2000) was an Israeli politician and businessman.

== Biography ==
Born in Romania in 1921, Shapira attended the Kokhav MeYa'akov yeshiva in Trzebinia, and was later certified as a teacher. In 1949, he immigrated to Israel and began working with his father, a furrier. In 1959 he bought a carpet factory, Carmel Carpets, in Or Akiva. At its peak the business employed 1,600 employees and had an annual turnover of $500 million.

He joined Agudat Yisrael, and became chairman of its Tel Aviv branch. He was elected to the Knesset on the party's list in 1981 and became chairman of the governing coalition. He was re-elected in 1984, after which he chaired the Finance Committee. He also served as chairman of the Bank of Israel's steering committee, wielding a strong influence on the country's financial state.

He lost his seat in the 1988 elections, but returned to the Knesset in 1992 (by which time the party had formed the United Torah Judaism alliance with Degel HaTorah). He lost his seat again in the 1996 elections.

He died in 2000 at the age of 79.
