= Moria (political party) =

Defunct Israeli political party

Moria מוריה
- Leader: Yitzhak Peretz
- Founded: 25 December 1990
- Dissolved: 1992
- Split from: Shas
- Merged into: United Torah Judaism
- Ideology: Ultra-Orthodox interest
- Most MKs: 1 (1990–1992)
- Fewest MKs: 1 (1990–1992)

Moria (Hebrew: מוריה) was a short-lived one-man political party in Israel between 1990 and 1992.

== Background ==
The party was established on 25 December 1990 during the 12th Knesset, when Minister of Immigrant Absorption and former Shas leader Yitzhak Peretz broke away from Shas to form his own Knesset faction. The faction remained part of Yitzhak Shamir's government, and Peretz retained his ministerial portfolio.

The party ceased to exist when the 12th Knesset was dissolved in 1992. Peretz ran on the United Torah Judaism list for the 1992 elections and retained his seat. However, he resigned from the Knesset three days after being re-elected.
