= Yehuda Meir Abramowicz =

Israeli politician (1914–2007)

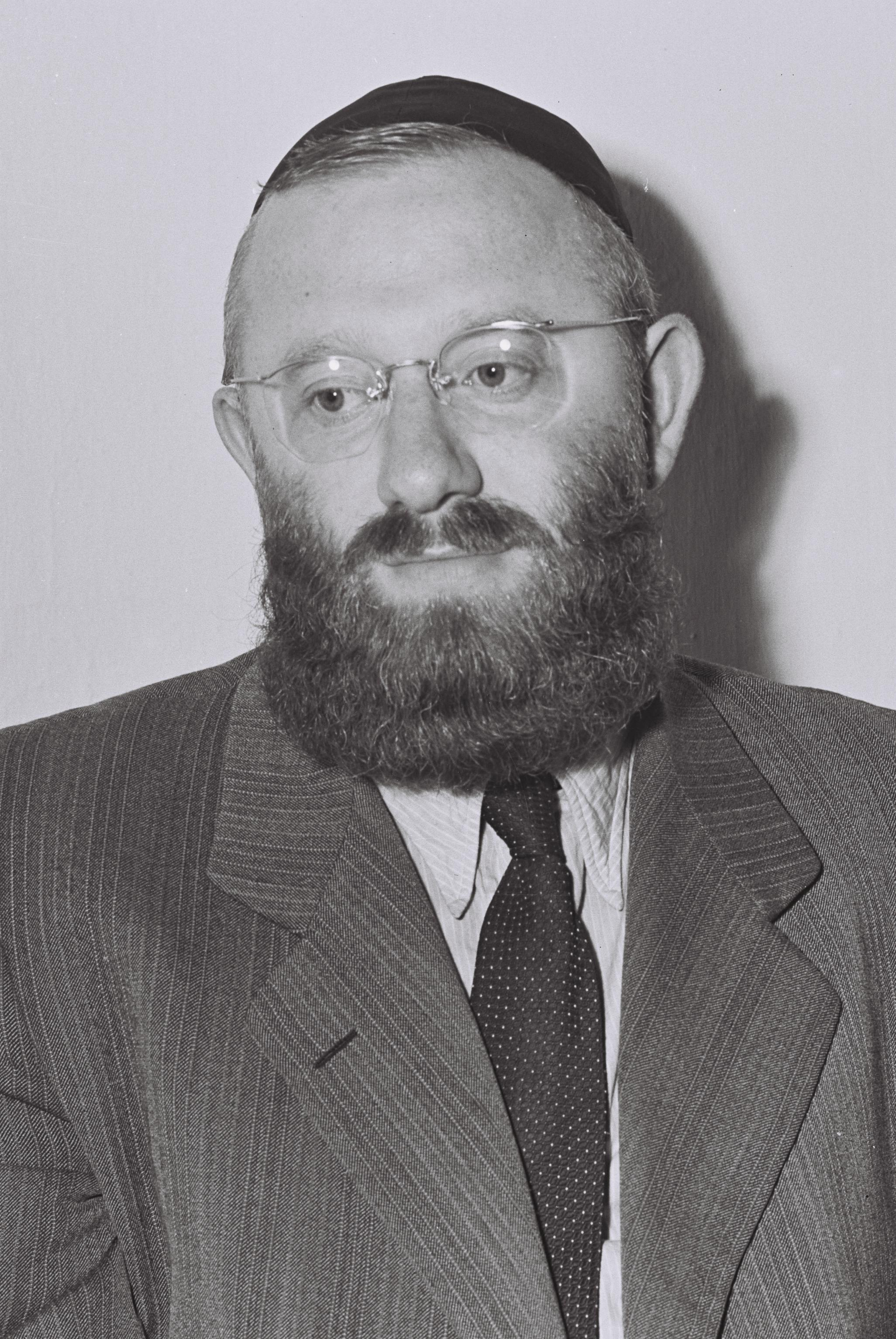
- Abramowicz in 1950

Faction represented in the Knesset
- 1969–1973: Agudat Yisrael
- 1973–1977: Religious Torah Front
- 1977–1981: Agudat Yisrael

Personal details
- Born: 24 July 1914 Konstantynów Łódzki, Russian Empire
- Died: 20 April 2007 (aged 92)

Yehuda Meir Abramowicz (Hebrew: יהודה מאיר אברמוביץ; born 24 July 1914, died 20 April 2007) was an Israeli rabbi and politician. He served as general secretary of Agudat Yisrael, which he represented in the Knesset from 1972 until 1981, and as Deputy Speaker of the Knesset between 1977 and 1981. He introduced legislation forcing drivers of vehicles to wear seat belts.

== Early years ==
Abramowitz was born in Konstantynów Łódzki in Congress Poland, part of the Russian Empire to Tzvi Yitzchok Abramowicz, who had been the shochet for Rav Chanokh Heynekh HaKohen Levin, the Rebbe of Alexander, and had been a chosid of the Chidushei Harim of Ger. When he was just nine months old his father died; he was orphaned of his mother as a teenager. Shortly afterwards, he was accepted as a student in the prestigious Yeshivas Chachmei Lublin. When Rabbi Meir Shapiro introduced the Daf Yomi, he dispatched the students of his yeshiva to deliver Daf Yomi lectures. Abramowicz was assigned the daily lecture at the synagogue of the Chozeh of Lublin; attendance grew rapidly until there were fifty participants each day.

== Achievements ==
Soon after his marriage in 1935, Abramowitz made aliyah to Mandate Palestine, settling in Tel Aviv. He was appointed by Agudat Yisrael as its representative on the Religious Committee of the Haganah, where he worked to maintain kashrut and Sabbath observance. In 1948, he was appointed as General Secretary of Agudat Yisrael, and he was a founder of the Chinuch Atzmai educational network. In 1950, he was elected to the Tel Aviv Council; from 1954 to 1984 he served as a deputy mayor of the city. During his period of service on Tel Aviv Council he was successful in having two gender-separated beaches established.

In 1980, he was elected Chairman of World Agudath Israel.
