= Taxi party =

Political party centered on lending ballot access

The term taxi party or briefcase party refers to a political party that has little or no real ideology, membership base, or organizational structure, and exists primarily to lend its legal registration and ballot access to politicians seeking to run for office. Taxi parties are common in states with fragmented party systems, weak partisan attachment, and high rates of candidate mobility, particularly in Africa and Latin America.

Taxi parties differ from personalist parties in that their platform is driven not by their leaders but by the individual candidates who utilize them. Factors such as minimal party registration requirements and prohibitions on independent candidates incentivize the establishment of taxi parties. The presence of taxi parties can undermine governability, erode ideological coherence, and legitimize practices such as party switching.

== See also ==
- Centrão
- Shelf party
