= Moshe Gafni =

Israeli politician (born 1952)

- משה גפני
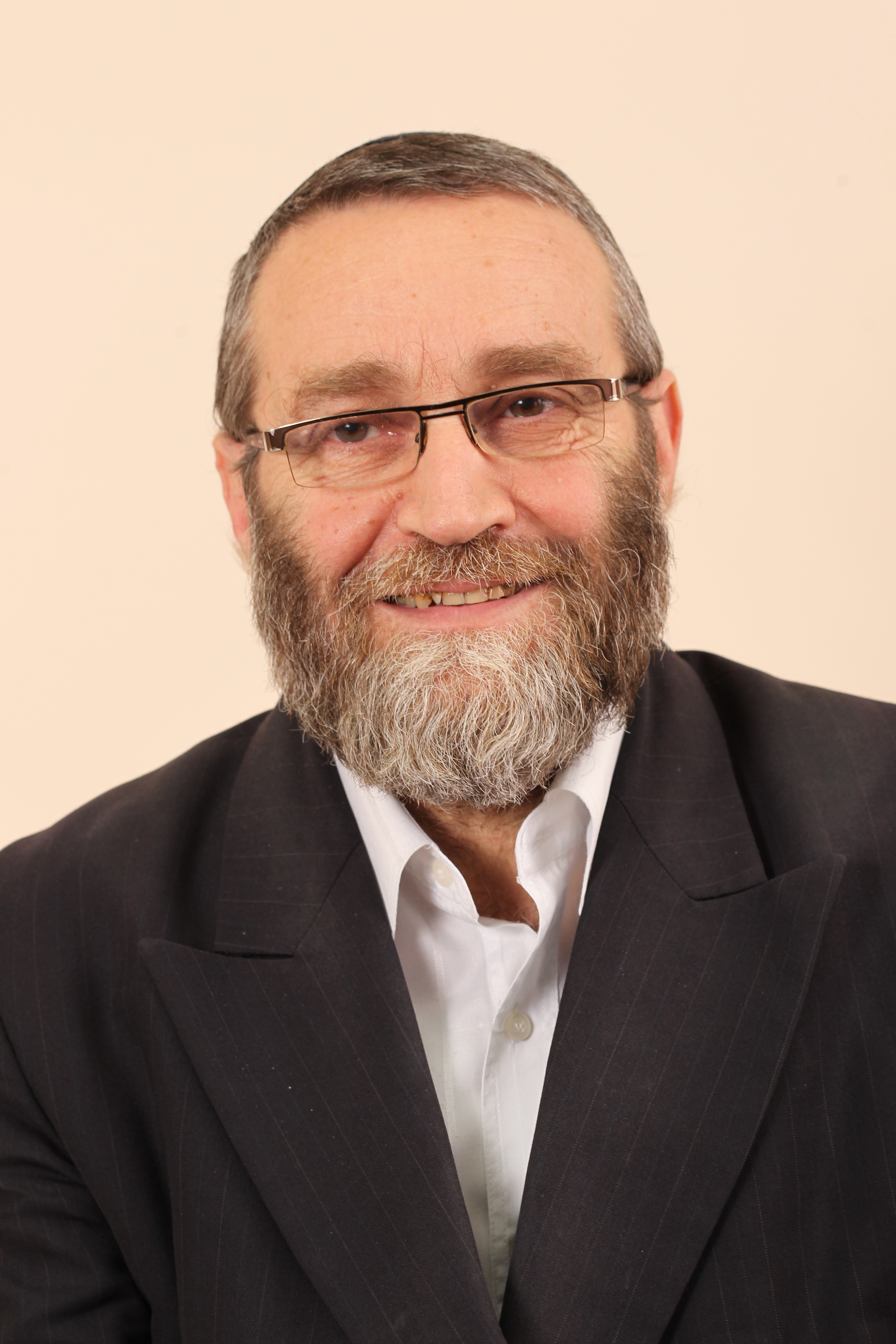

Faction represented in the Knesset
- 1988–1992: Degel HaTorah
- 1994–1996: United Torah Judaism
- 1996: Degel HaTorah
- 1996–1998: United Torah Judaism
- 1999–2005: United Torah Judaism
- 2005–2006: Degel HaTorah
- 2006–2008: United Torah Judaism
- 2008–2009: Degel HaTorah
- 2009–2026: United Torah Judaism

Personal details
- Born: 5 May 1952 (age 74) Tel Aviv, Israel
- Party: Degel HaTorah
- Spouse: Hana Smutni
- Children: 3
- Education: Slabodka yeshiva

Moshe Gafni (Hebrew: משה גפני; born 5 May 1952) is an Israeli politician who served as a Member of the Knesset for the Ashkenazi Haredi party Degel HaTorah in several spells between 1988 and 2026.

== Early life ==
Born in Tel Aviv, Gafni was educated in a yeshiva, and later moved to and worked as head of a Kollel in Ofakim. He lives in Bnei Brak, is married, and has three children.

== Political career ==
He was first elected to the Knesset on Degel HaTorah's list in 1988, and was appointed Deputy Minister of Religious Affairs in Yitzhak Shamir's government in 1990. For the 1992 elections, the party joined Agudat Yisrael in forming an alliance called United Torah Judaism, which won four seats. Although he initially lost his seat, Gafni re-entered the Knesset in 1994 as part of a rotation agreement between the two factions. A similar arrangement operated after the 1996 elections, with Gafni taking the seat for the first half of the session (i. e., until 1998).

Gafni re-entered the Knesset following the 1999 election. In the absence of a rotation agreement, Gafni served the full term, and was re-elected in both 2003 and 2006. When Degel HaTorah split from Agudat Yisrael during the latter stages of the 16th Knesset, Gafni was appointed the party's Parliamentary Group Chairman.

In the 18th Knesset, Gafni was the chairman of the Knesset's Finance Committee.

Rabbi Dov Lando released a statement on 5 September 2026, indicating that Gafni would not be given a slot on the party's list in the 2026 Israeli legislative election, calling for a "refresh" with the party's Knesset members.

== Views and opinions ==
=== Israeli-Palestinian conflict ===
Moshe Gafni describes himself as holding political and diplomatic views that are close to those of the left wing. He has stated that the Palestinians were in the country before the arrival of the modern Jewish settlement in the Land of Israel. This position was reflected in 2005, when he voted against the Israeli disengagement plan, while simultaneously supporting the state budget, a move that enabled the government to carry out the plan.

In 2017, Gafni sparked controversy when he claimed that "the left is more intelligent than the right," a statement that drew sharp criticism from within his own party. In June 2025, against the backdrop of the ongoing Israel–Hamas war, he spoke out strongly against the continuation of the Gaza war and questioned its objectives, stating: "I don't understand what we're fighting for."

=== Social views ===
In February 2016, Prime Minister Benjamin Netanyahu criticized Gafni and other political leaders for making disparaging remarks about Reform and Conservative Judaism. Gafni, following a decision to expand the egalitarian section of the Western Wall, declared he would refuse to recognize the decision, and that Reform Jews were "a group of clowns who stab the Holy Torah". He initially expressed a degree of support for the Western Wall compromise, provided that there would be complete separation between the entrances. However, following pressure from the ultra-Orthodox public, he changed his position and led an ultimatum that resulted in the suspension of the arrangement in 2017.

Regarding the Sabbath, Gafni considers the "Supermarkets Law" a significant achievement in strengthening the religious character of public spaces. In closed-door discussions, he reportedly stated that the law would make it possible to "make further progress in Sabbath observance," beyond the existing status quo. This was to be achieved, among other measures, by recruiting hundreds of non-Jewish inspectors to enforce the law.

Conversely, regarding the Temple Mount, Gafni maintains a strict religious and political position opposing Jewish visits to the site. He repeatedly appealed to Prime Minister Benjamin Netanyahu, demanding that he prevent elected public officials from ascending the Temple Mount, describing such visits as a "desecration of the holy site" and arguing that they do not demonstrate sovereignty, but rather cause serious diplomatic and security damage in relations with the Muslim world. Members of his party distanced themselves from these statements.

In 2011, he supported granting the Israel Securities Authority administrative enforcement powers in the capital market, with the aim of strengthening the protection of public funds and maintaining economic stability.

Gafni was strongly opposed to the Supreme Court ruling that the state must recognize gay marriages carried out abroad, stating: "We don't have a Jewish state here. We have Sodom and Gomorrah here." He was simaltaneously one of the few ultra-Orthodox public figures to condemn the violence carried out by members of the community over plans for the 2006 Jerusalem gay pride parade.

In 2023 Gafni and Ya'akov Asher introduced a bill that would have banned proselytizing of Christianity in Israel, which was halted by Netanyahu.

=== Judicial reform ===
Gafni's attitude toward the Israeli judicial system is characterized by criticism. He has repeatedly claimed that the courts systematically rule against the ultra-Orthodox public and has even threatened civil protest measures, such as a tax revolt.
