= Yitzhak Peretz (politician born 1938) =

Israeli politician

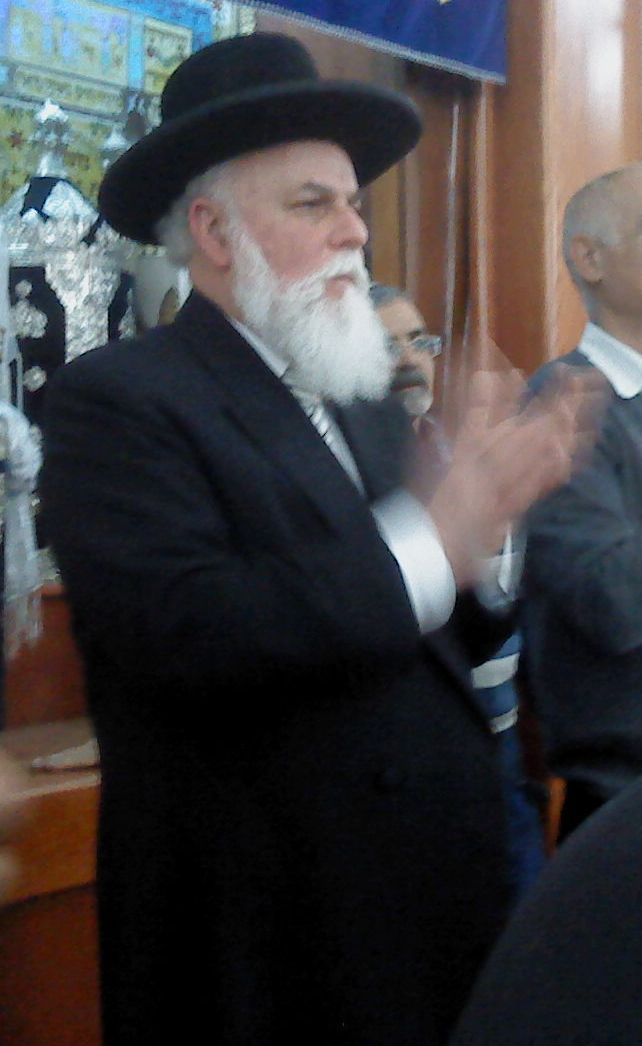
- Peretz in 2013

Ministerial roles
- 1984: Minister without Portfolio
- 1984–1987: Minister of Internal Affairs
- 1987–1988: Minister without Portfolio
- 1988–1992: Minister of Immigrant Absorption

Faction represented in the Knesset
- 1984–1990: Shas
- 1990–1992: Moria
- 1992: United Torah Judaism

Personal details
- Born: 26 March 1938 (age 88) Casablanca, Morocco

Rabbi Yitzhak Haim Peretz (Hebrew: יצחק חיים פרץ; born 26 March 1938) is an Israeli former politician who held several ministerial portfolios during the 1980s and early 1990s.

== Biography ==
Born in Casablanca in Morocco, Peretz made aliyah to Israel in 1950. He studied at the Yeshiva High School, "Noam", in Pardes Hana, at the Hebron Yeshiva, Jerusalem, and at the kollel in Petah Tikva; he was ordained as a rabbi at Yeshivat Hazon Ovadia. He served as chief rabbi of Ra'anana from 1962 until 1984.

In 1984 Peretz became the leader of the new Sephardic Haredi Shas party, and in the elections that year, he won a seat in the Knesset. The party joined the national unity government, and Peretz was appointed Minister without Portfolio. On 24 December 1984, he became Minister of Internal Affairs, a post he resigned two years later, in January 1987, in protest against the Supreme Court ordering him to recognise as Jewish a woman who underwent a conversion to Judaism with a Reform rabbi, a controversial procedure from the Haredi point of view, stating that "The High Court of Justice demanded that I list a non-Jew as a Jew". On 25 May, he rejoined the government as a Minister without Portfolio.

Following the 1988 elections, he was appointed Minister of Immigrant Absorption. On 25 December 1990, he left Shas and founded a new religious faction, Moria, though he remained a member of the cabinet.

Prior to the 1992 elections, he joined United Torah Judaism (UTJ), and was placed second on the party's list, in order to attract voters from Shas, with the agreement that he would resign from the Knesset if his presence did not significantly increase the alliance's vote share. The elections saw UTJ win only three seats, a reduction from the seven won by the two parties running separately in 1988, and Peretz resigned three days after the Knesset term started.

Peretz was elected to the Chief Rabbinate in 2002, and was re-elected in 2008. He is currently the City Rabbi of Ra'anana.
