= Eliezer Moses =

Israeli politician

- אליעזר מוזס
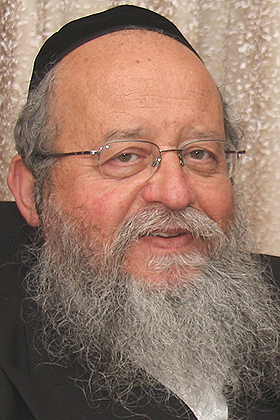

Faction represented in the Knesset
- 2009–2019: United Torah Judaism

Personal details
- Born: 20 October 1946 (age 78); Jerusalem, Mandatory Palestine

Menachem Eliezer Moses (Hebrew: מנחם אליעזר מוזס; born 20 October 1946) is an Israeli politician. A member of Agudat Yisrael, he served as a member of the Knesset for the United Torah Judaism alliance between 2009 and 2019, and as Deputy Minister of Education from 2011 to 2013.

== Biography ==
Moses was educated in a yeshiva, and worked as a project initiator, he also served in the Israeli Army as a Military Adjutant. He served as the deputy Director General in the Ministry of Education and was responsibly for ultra-orthodox education. He also helped plan and establish nursing homes for the elderly and housing projects for young couples.

He was placed eleventh on the United Torah Judaism list for the 2006 elections, but missed out on a seat as the party received only five mandates. Prior to the 2009 elections he was placed fifth on the party's list, and entered the Knesset as the party won five seats. In February 2011 he was appointed Deputy Minister of Education after Meir Porush resigned his seat as part of a rotation agreement.

Moses currently lives in Jerusalem, and is married with ten children. His daughter Heidi Moses is an activist for the Likud party and seeking a position in its 2022 parliamentary candidates list.
