= Hillel Horowitz =

Israeli orthodox rabbi and politician

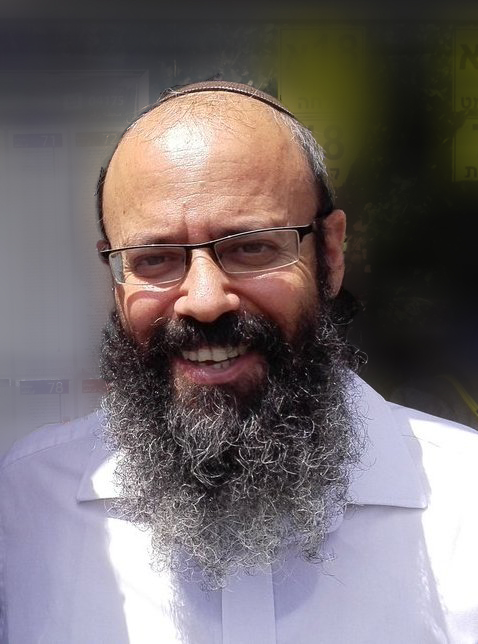
- Horowitz in 2017

Faction represented in the Knesset
- 2015: The Jewish Home

Personal details
- Born: 31 March 1964 (age 62) Israel

Rabbi Hillel Ilan Horowitz (Hebrew: הלל אילן הורוביץ; born 31 March 1964) is an Israeli Orthodox rabbi and politician. He briefly served as a member of the Knesset for the Jewish Home in 2015.

He grew up in Merkaz Shapira, and attended Yeshivat Or Etzion, the Beit El yeshiva, and Mercaz HaRav Kook. He graduated from the Military Rabbi course in 1987, and joined the Military Rabbinate, becoming rabbi of the Givati Brigade. He later gained an MBA from Ono Academic College, and in 1990, he became head of a yeshiva in Kiryat Arba. In 2010, he was appointed Adviser on Settlement Affairs by Nazareth Illit mayor Shimon Gapso.

Prior to the 2013 Knesset elections, he was placed 13th on the Jewish Home list. Although the party won 12 seats, Horowitz entered the Knesset on 16 February 2015 as a replacement for Uri Orbach, who died in office. However, he was not on the party's list for the March 2015 elections, and lost his seat.
