= Moshe Roth =

Israeli lawyer and politician

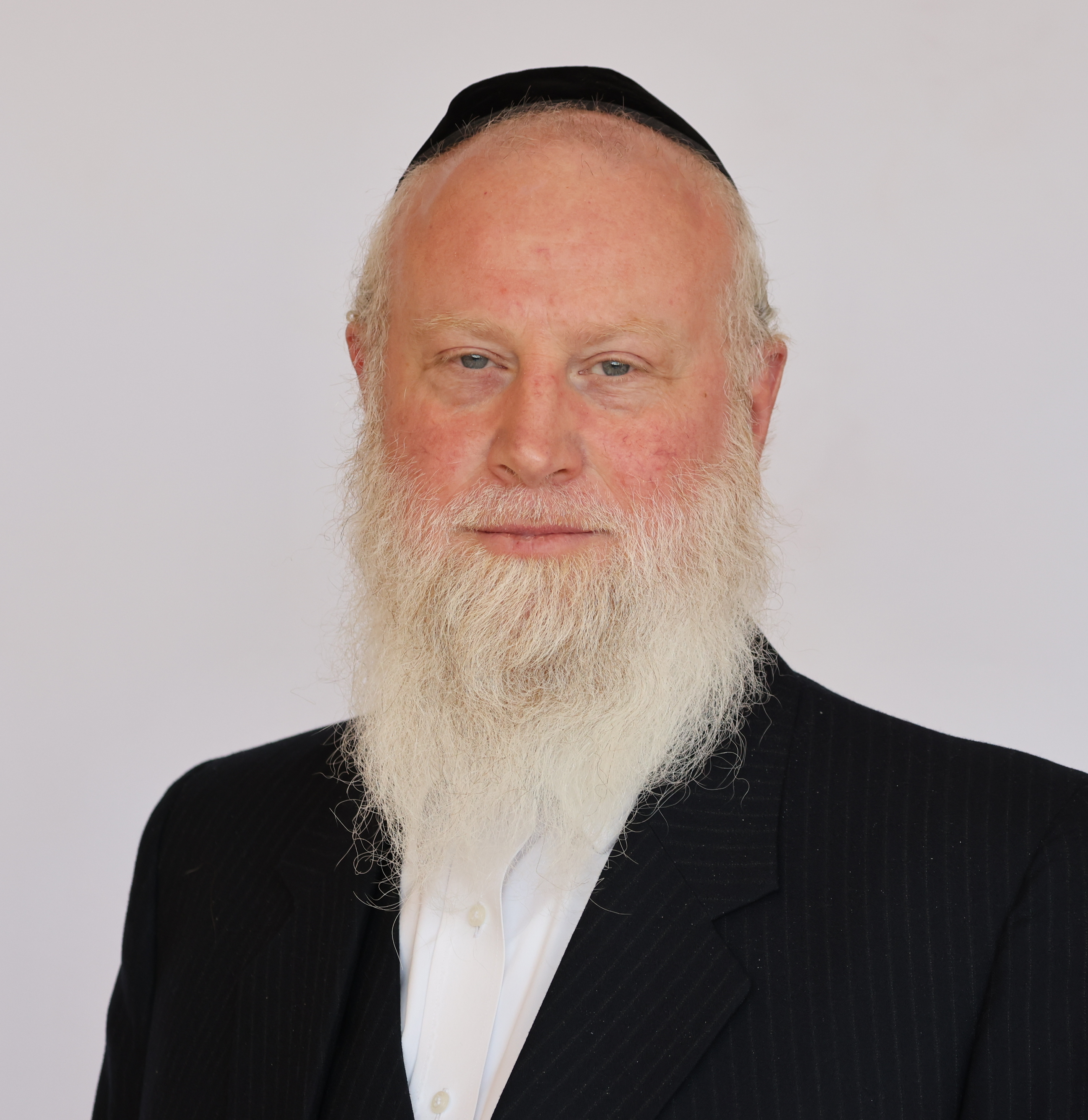
- Roth in 2023

Faction represented in the Knesset
- 2023–2025: United Torah Judaism

Personal details
- Born: 13 February 1964 (age 62) Crown Heights, United States

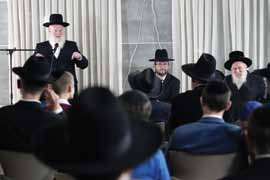
Roth speaking at a gathering of the Zion Holiness Society in 2022

Moshe Shimon Roth (Hebrew: משה רוט; born 13 February 1964) is an Israeli lawyer and politician who served as a member of the Knesset for the United Torah Judaism political alliance.

== Biography ==
Roth was born in 1964 in Crown Heights, Brooklyn in New York to Chaim Alter Roth, a co-founder of Sanz Medical Center and Laniado Hospital in Netanya and a prominent activist of Agudath Israel in the United States. As a child, he studied at the Sanz yeshiva and then continued in Yeshiva Gedole of Sanz and in the Lucerne Yeshiva, in Switzerland.

At the age of 20 he emigrated to Israel alone. He earned a bachelor's degree in law from Ono Academic College. In 1999 he was appointed to the board of directors of Laniado Hospital in Netanya. At the same time, he served as head of the management of the Sanz Hasidic institutions in Bnei Brak. Between 1996 and 1999 he served as an advisor on "neighborhood rehabilitation" to Deputy Minister of Construction and Housing Meir Porush.

Until 2021 the Sanz Hasidic movement was not represented in the United Torah Judaism (UTJ) alliance's election lists. However, prior of the 2021 Knesset elections, Roth was placed tenth on the UTJ list as a representative of the Sanz Hasidic movement. However, he was not elected as UTJ won only seven seats.

For the 2022 election he was placed ninth on the UTJ list. Although the UTJ list won only seven seats, Roth entered the Knesset in January 2023 following the resignation of Meir Porush under the Norwegian Law (which allows MKs appointed as ministers to resign their Knesset seat). Roth was subsequently appointed as a Deputy Speaker of the Knesset, and as a member of the Foreign Affairs and Security Committee, the Health Committee, the State Comptroller Committee, and several other committees. He also serves as chairman of the parliamentary lobby for public hospitals.

He was replaced by Meir Porush in July 2025.
