= Funding unit =

A funding unit, in Israeli politics, is a measurement of the campaign financing allocated to a party.

== Background ==
The amount a party is given depends on whether it previously held seats in the Knesset and whether it passed the electoral threshold.

== History ==
The Knesset's finance committee originally determined how much money was given to a party, until 1994, when that ability was transferred to a "professional committee".

The amount has increased numerous times. The 22nd Knesset allowed an increase in a February 2020 vote. The Knesset intended to approve an increase in June 2022, ahead of the 2022 Israeli legislative election, but the Knesset's pending dissolution delayed it. The Public Committee on Party Financing ultimately approved the increase on 30 June. The 25th Knesset approved an increase in July 2026 in the number of funding units for "supplements" to factions from one to 1.4.

== See also ==
- Party funding in Israel
