= United Torah Judaism =

Israeli electoral alliance

United Torah Judaism יהדות התורה
- Leader: Ya'akov Asher
- Founded: 1992
- Ideology: Ashkenazi Haredi interests; Religious conservatism; Social conservatism; Social democracy; Haredi non-Zionism
- Political position: Social: Right-wing; Economic: Centre-left
- Religion: Haredi Judaism
- International affiliation: World Agudath Israel
- Colours: Navy blue
- Knesset: 7 / 120

Election symbol
- ג ج

United Torah Judaism (Hebrew: יַהֲדוּת הַתּוֹרָה, Yahadut HaTorah) is a Haredi, religious conservative political alliance in Israel. The alliance, consisting of Agudat Yisrael and Degel HaTorah, was first formed in 1992, in order to maximize Ashkenazi Haredi representation in the Knesset. Despite the alliance splitting in 2004 over rabbinical differences, the parties reconciled in 2006, in order to prevent vote splitting. In April 2019, the party achieved its highest number of seats ever, receiving eight seats.

Unlike similar religiously-oriented parties in Israel (including Shas, the Religious Zionist Party, and Noam) UTJ is non-Zionist. Unlike some other Haredim, the party is notable for its usage of technology and electronic communication.

== History ==
First logo of the list

Before the establishment of Degel HaTorah and the formation of United Torah Judaism, the two factions were united under one united Agudat Yisrael party, but the late mentor and supreme guide of the Litvak (non-Hasidic) group, Rabbi Elazar Shach, broke away from Agudat Yisrael when he concluded that the party was not representing enough the political interests of the Lithuanian Haredim. In the 1988 Israeli legislative election he split from them, and created the Degel HaTorah party for the "Lithuanian" Haredi Jews (also known as "Mitnagdim" by some). He chose the name Degel HaTorah, meaning "Flag of The Torah", to be a contrast to the well-known flag of Israel and its connection with the secular-dominated State of Israel (an "anti-Torah" entity, in his opinion). Rabbi Shach was known as an outspoken critic of the secular Israeli way of life.

The alliance was first formed in the 1992 Israeli legislative election, including Agudat Yisrael, Degel HaTorah and Rabbi Yitzhak Peretz, whom broke from Shas.

The UTJ party also had considerable influence on the Israeli Sephardi Jews' Shas party. In fact, the Shas party was founded by Rabbi Shach at an earlier juncture when he was previously also frustrated with the policies of the Hasidic rebbes; so, he turned to the Sephardic Jews, and urged his own Ashkenazi followers at that time, to vote for the new Shas party, which they did in record numbers. Later, Shas broke with Rabbi Shach, as it adopted its own independent political stance under Rabbi Ovadia Yosef. Yet, Shas generally goes in the same direction, as it has similar values, needs and interests within the state.

Haaretz cited that some women activists have protested the fact that UTJ, along with other Haredi parties, refuses to run female candidates for office. UTJ responded that they have the right to follow the Jewish laws of modesty, which separates roles of men and women, and maintain that they do not deny women the right to vote for any other Knesset parties of their choice. They add that Haredi women will not vote for them if they elect women.

=== 2004 split ===
In January 2004, the party split back into its two factions following a disagreement over how to join Ariel Sharon's coalition, which had been negotiated by Rabbi Yosef Shalom Eliashiv. Rabbi Eliashiv wanted the five MKs to have a three-month "waiting period" before accepting jobs in the government. Rabbi Yaakov Aryeh Alter, the Gerrer rebbe, however, thought that all Agudat members should accept positions immediately. The Agudat MKs argued that they should be entitled to follow their own rabbis' ruling, while their Degel HaTorah counterparts accused them of disrespecting Rabbi Eliashiv. The Agudat faction proceeded to follow the rebbe of Gur's instructions, with MK Yaakov Litzman accepting the position as chairman of the Knesset Finance Committee. This infuriated Degel HaTorah and its leaders, and in response, they left the party, dissolving a twelve-year-old partnership.

=== Re-unification as a party ===
In December 2005, there was a meeting between representatives of the two factions, presumably to smooth over the ill-feelings of the previous year and to attempt to re-group before the March 2006 elections. A number of issues were worked out, such as Degel HaTorah's insistence on the joint list being equally divided between the two parties. (In the past, Agudat Israel has received more votes than Degel HaTorah.) Degel HaTorah has re-organized itself. It has a fully equipped modern party office on Hamabit Street 10 in Jerusalem's Geula neighborhood. It conducted a party convention, its first in 15 years, in December 2005.

In early February 2006, Agudat Israel and Degel HaTorah agreed to run together as United Torah Judaism, despite the fact that the contentious "sixth seat" issue remained undecided. The two groups finally compromised by proposing dividing the sixth seat between two representatives on a rotating schedule (as was done in the last Knesset between the Belz and Vizhnitz communities for the fifth seat). This solution seemed to mollify the respective groups, and paved the way for the re-establishment of a joint list for the 2006 elections, although the Belz court was reportedly irked that once again, it was being asked to sacrifice part of its representation.

UTJ MKs told reporters that any decision to join future government coalitions will be dependent on achieving two "central posts" to be split between Agudah and Degel. Similarly, in order to avoid the problems that led to the 2004 split, disagreements about joining a coalition will not be determined by a majority vote of MKs, but rather taken to the party's rabbinic leaders.

Various media interviews with the party's Knesset members confirmed that it would strongly consider joining a coalition with the Ehud Olmert-led Kadima party, should it be offered to them after the elections. In March 2006, the rabbinical leaders of UTJ, including Rabbi Yosef Shalom Eliashiv, issued public declarations urging the Haredi public to vote for the party's list. In the election, the party increased its mandate by one, to six seats.

Longtime party leader Moshe Gafni was removed in September 2026 and was replaced by Ya'akov Asher.

== Ideology ==
UTJ wants to maintain the "status quo" relationship in regard to religion-and-state issues. The party has no uniform opinion on the issue of increasing settlements in the West Bank.

== Structure and constituency ==
UTJ has been, until 2026, a coalition of two individual parties, choosing to take advantage of Israeli election law in order to maximize the number of seats it can gain in the Knesset (and thus maximize its influence):

- The Agudat Yisrael ("Union of Israel") party that is guided by the followers of Hasidism in Israel, and also consisting of Ashkenazi Jews. The leading members of this party are the followers of the Ger, Vizhnitz, and Belz Hasidim.
- The Degel HaTorah ("Banner of the Torah") party that is guided by the rabbinic heads (usually the leading rosh yeshivas ("deans") of the Lithuanian yeshivas) of non-Hasidic Haredi Ashkenazi Jews.

The Agudat Yisrael faction takes its directions from the Hasidic rebbes of Ger (Rabbi Yaakov Aryeh Alter), Vizhnitz (Rabbi Yisroel Hager), and Belz (Rabbi Yissachar Dov Rokeach). Policy decisions are also weighed and decided by a Moetzes Gedolei HaTorah ("Council of Torah Sages"), a council of communal rabbis, made up of mostly senior and elderly rebbes.

Degel HaTorah's pre-eminent sages are Rabbi Dov Landau and Rabbi Moshe Hillel Hirsch, of Bnei Brak. Policy decisions are also weighed and decided by their own "Moetzes" (Council) of experienced communal rabbis, made up of mostly senior and elderly rosh yeshivas. There is no word from the party on the process of succession as leader, and it is usually unofficially announced in their daily newspaper Yated Neeman.

A third faction representing Belz and Shlomei Emunim, called Homat Torat Yisrael, (Note: Hebrew: חומת תורת ישראל, romanized: Wall of Torah of Israel) was founded in 2026, using a shelf party. The party name was previously Manhigut Yehudit.

Name	Ideology	Demographic	Leader	Current MKs
Agudat Yisrael	Religious conservatism	Hasidic	Yaakov Litzman	3 / 120
Degel HaTorah	Religious conservatism	Litvish	Moshe Gafni	4 / 120
Homat Torat Yisrael	Religious conservatism	Hasidic	TBD	0 / 120

== Election results ==
=== Knesset ===
Election	Leader	Votes	%	Seats	+/–	Government
1992	Avraham Yosef Shapira	86,167	3.29 (#7)	4 / 120	New	Opposition
1996	Meir Porush	98,657	3.23 (#8)	4 / 120	0	Coalition
1999	Meir Porush	125,741	3.80 (#9)	5 / 120	▲1	Coalition
2003	Yaakov Litzman	135,087	4.29 (#8)	5 / 120	0	Opposition
2006	Yaakov Litzman	147,091	4.69 (#8)	6 / 120	▲1	Opposition
2009	Yaakov Litzman	147,954	4.39 (#6)	5 / 120	▼1	Coalition
2013	Yaakov Litzman	195,892	5.16 (#6)	7 / 120	▲2	Opposition
2015	Yaakov Litzman	210,143	4.99 (#9)	6 / 120	▼1	Coalition
Apr 2019	Yaakov Litzman	249,049	5.78 (#4)	8 / 120	▲2	Snap election
Sep 2019	Yaakov Litzman	268,688	6.06 (#6)	7 / 120	▼1	Snap election
2020	Yaakov Litzman	274,437	5.98 (#5)	7 / 120	0	Coalition
2021	Moshe Gafni	248,391	5.63 (#7)	7 / 120	0	Opposition
2022	Yitzhak Goldknopf	280,125	5.88 (#6)	7 / 120	0	Coalition
2026	Ya'akov Asher	312,632	5.49 (#9)	7 / 120	0	TBA

== Knesset members ==
Knesset term	Seats	Faction	Members
18th (2009–2013)	3	Agudat Yisrael	Yaakov Litzman, Meir Porush (Note: Replaced by Yisrael Eichler on 6 February 2011), Eliezer Moses
18th (2009–2013)	2	Degel HaTorah	Moshe Gafni, Uri Maklev
19th (2013–2015)	4	Agudat Yisrael	Yaakov Litzman, Meir Porush, Eliezer Moses, Yisrael Eichler
19th (2013–2015)	3	Degel HaTorah	Moshe Gafni, Uri Maklev, Ya'akov Asher
20th (2015–2019)	4	Agudat Yisrael	Yaakov Litzman, Meir Porush (Note: Replaced by Ya'akov Asher on 24 May 2016), Eliezer Moses, Yisrael Eichler
20th (2015–2019)	2	Degel HaTorah	Moshe Gafni, Uri Maklev
21st (2019)	4	Agudat Yisrael	Yaakov Litzman, Meir Porush, Ya'akov Tessler, Yisrael Eichler
21st (2019)	4	Degel HaTorah	Moshe Gafni, Uri Maklev, Ya'akov Asher, Yitzhak Pindrus
22nd (2019–2020)	4	Agudat Yisrael	Yaakov Litzman, Meir Porush, Ya'akov Tessler, Yisrael Eichler
22nd (2019–2020)	3	Degel HaTorah	Moshe Gafni, Uri Maklev, Ya'akov Asher
23rd (2020–2021)	4	Agudat Yisrael	Yaakov Litzman (Note: Replaced by Eliyahu Hasid), Meir Porush, Ya'akov Tessler, Yisrael Eichler
23rd (2020–2021)	3	Degel HaTorah	Moshe Gafni, Uri Maklev, Ya'akov Asher
24th (2021–2022)	3	Agudat Yisrael	Yaakov Litzman (Note: Replaced by Ya'akov Tessler following resignation on 1 June 2022), Meir Porush, Yisrael Eichler
24th (2021–2022)	4	Degel HaTorah	Moshe Gafni, Uri Maklev, Ya'akov Asher, Yitzhak Pindrus
25th (2022–2026)	4	Agudat Yisrael	Yitzhak Goldknopf (Note: Replaced by Yitzhak Pindrus on 1 January 2023), Meir Porush (Note: Replaced by Moshe Roth on 25 January 2023, then reversed on 16 July 2025), Ya'akov Tessler (Note: Replaced by Eliyahu Baruchi in July 2025), Yisrael Eichler
25th (2022–2026)	3	Degel HaTorah	Moshe Gafni, Uri Maklev, Ya'akov Asher (Note: Replaced by Yitzhak Goldknopf on 15 June 2025)

== See also ==
- Agudath Israel of America
- Hasidim and Mitnagdim
- World Agudath Israel
- Chardal
- Religious Torah Front
