= Degel HaTorah =

Degel HaTorah דֶּגֶל הַתּוֹרָה
- Leader: Ya'akov Asher
- Founded: 1988
- Split from: Agudat Yisrael
- Newspaper: Yated Ne'eman
- Ideology: Religious conservatism; Social conservatism; Haredi non-Zionism; Haredi interests; Lithuanian Haredi interests
- Political position: Right-wing
- Religion: Haredi Judaism (Misnagdim)
- National affiliation: United Torah Judaism
- Knesset: 4 / 120

Election symbol
- עץ

Website
- http://m.degel.org.il/

Degel HaTorah (Hebrew: דֶּגֶל הַתּוֹרָה, lit. 'Standard of the Law') is an Ashkenazi Haredi political party in Israel. For much of its existence, it has been allied with Agudat Yisrael, under the name United Torah Judaism.

== History ==
Degel HaTorah was founded in 1988, as a splinter from Agudat Israel. Its establishment by Rabbi Elazar Shach was due to ongoing policy disputes with the Hasidic rabbis within Agudat Yisrael. In the 1988 elections, the party won two seats, taken by Avraham Ravitz and Moshe Gafni, and joined Yitzhak Shamir's coalition government. For the 1992 elections, the party allied itself with Agudat Yisrael, under the name United Torah Judaism.

Although the party split shortly before the 1996 elections, they re-united for the elections. This was repeated for the 1999, 2006, and 2009 elections.

As of 2022, the party has three MKs (of the seven representing United Torah Judaism): Moshe Gafni, Uri Maklev, and Ya'akov Asher.

Gafni was removed from party leadership in September 2026.

== Ideology ==
Degel HaTorah represents the "Lithuanian wing" of the non-Hasidic Haredim (known as "Mitnagdim"), as opposed to the Hasidic-dominated Agudat Yisrael party. Sometimes, the parties compete against each other; at other times, they join forces within a political alliance called United Torah Judaism (UTJ) (Yahadut HaTorah in Hebrew).

In Jerusalem, it was based on a long-standing argument against a 1989 agreement between Degel HaTorah's then-spiritual leader Rabbi Elazar Shach, the venerated Rosh yeshiva of the famed Ponevezh Yeshiva in Bnei Brak, and the spiritual leader of Agudat Yisrael, the Pnei Menachem of Gur, Rabbi Pinchas Menachem Alter. The deal, based on the demographics of the time, stated that when UTJ would join forces, Aguda would receive 60% of the seats, and Degel 40%. This agreement was first contested in May 2016, when Degel's Knesset leader Moshe Gafni demanded that then-Deputy Education Minister Meir Porush resign from the Knesset, in order to give Degel 3 out of the 6 seats held by UTJ. Porush was able to keep his ministerial position under the 2015 so-called Norwegian Law. In 2018, Degel reached a 50–50 agreement with Aguda, with an Aguda representative as the Chairman of the party.

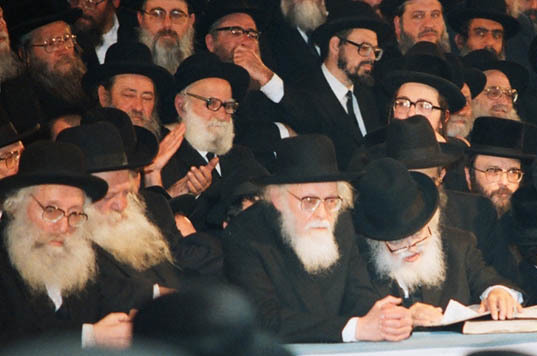
A Degel HaTorah gathering. (L–R) Rabbis Shlomo Shimshon Karelitz, Chaim Kanievsky, Yosef Shalom Elyashiv, Elazar Shach

Degel HaTorah's rabbinical arbiter ("posek") was, until his death in 2012, centenarian Rabbi Yosef Shalom Eliashiv of Jerusalem. Rabbi Eliashiv served as one of two Chairmen of Degel HaTorah's Moetzes Gedolei HaTorah ("Council of Torah Sages"). After Rabbi Eliyashiv's death, Rabbi Aharon Yehuda Leib Shteinman led the party; after him, by Rabbi Chaim Kanievsky and Rabbi Gershon Edelstein.

== Election results ==
=== Knesset ===
Election	Leader	Votes	%	Seats	+/–	Government
1988	Avraham Ravitz	34,279	1.50 (#13)	2 / 120	New	Coalition
1992	Avraham Ravitz	part of United Torah Judaism		1 / 120	▼1	Opposition
1996	Avraham Ravitz	part of United Torah Judaism		2 / 120	▲1	Coalition
1999	Avraham Ravitz	part of United Torah Judaism		2 / 120	0	Coalition
2003	Avraham Ravitz	part of United Torah Judaism		2 / 120	0	Opposition
2006	Moshe Gafni	part of United Torah Judaism		2 / 120	0	Opposition
2009	Moshe Gafni	part of United Torah Judaism		2 / 120	0	Coalition
2013	Moshe Gafni	part of United Torah Judaism		3 / 120	▲1	Opposition
2015	Moshe Gafni	part of United Torah Judaism		3 / 120	0	Coalition
Apr 2019	Moshe Gafni	part of United Torah Judaism		4 / 120	▲1	Snap election
Sep 2019	Moshe Gafni	part of United Torah Judaism		3 / 120	▼1	Snap election
2020	Moshe Gafni	part of United Torah Judaism		4 / 120	▲1	Coalition
2021	Moshe Gafni	part of United Torah Judaism		4 / 120	0	Opposition
2022	Moshe Gafni	part of United Torah Judaism		4 / 120	0	Coalition (2022–2025)
2022	Moshe Gafni	part of United Torah Judaism		4 / 120	0	Opposition (2025–2026)
2026	Ya'akov Asher	part of United Torah Judaism		4 / 120	0	TBA

== See also ==
- Hasidim and Mitnagdim
