= Meir Porush =

Israeli politician (born 1955)

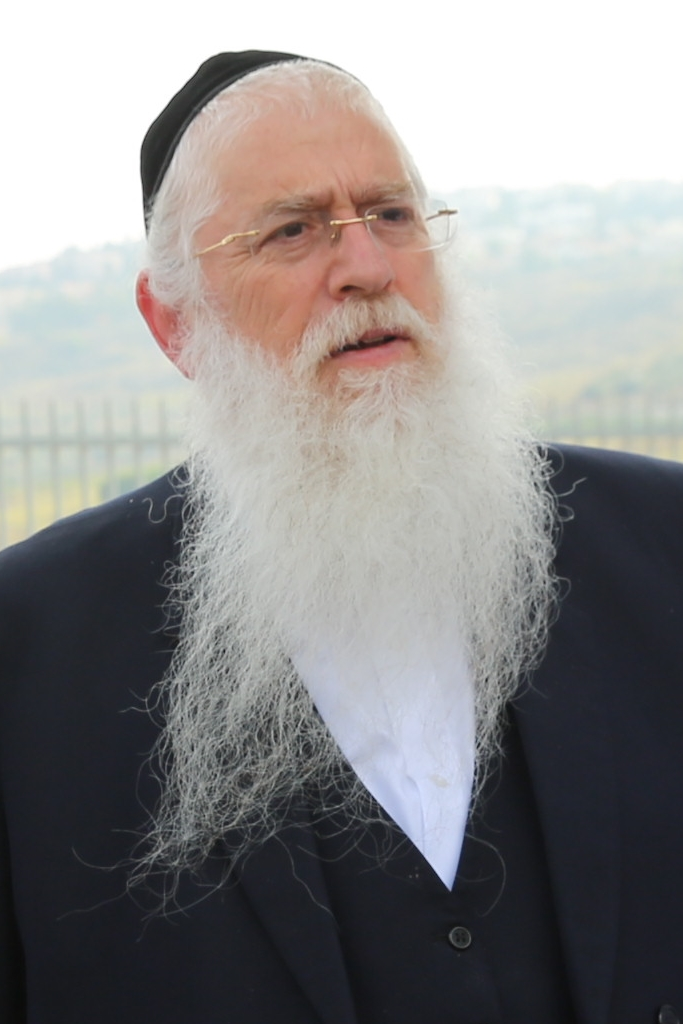
- Porush in 2014

Ministerial roles
- 2023–2025: Minister of Jerusalem Affairs and Jewish Tradition

Faction represented in the Knesset
- 1996–1999: United Torah Judaism
- 1999: Agudat Yisrael
- 1999–2005: United Torah Judaism
- 2005–2006: Agudat Yisrael
- 2006–2008: United Torah Judaism
- 2008–2009: Agudat Yisrael
- 2009–2011: United Torah Judaism
- 2013–2016: United Torah Judaism
- 2019–2020: United Torah Judaism
- 2025–: United Torah Judaism

Personal details
- Born: 11 June 1955 (age 71) Jerusalem, Israel

Meir Porush (Hebrew: מֵאִיר פֹּרוּשׁ; born 11 June 1955) is an Israeli politician who has served as a member of the Knesset for the Haredi Agudat Yisrael faction of United Torah Judaism in several spells since 1996. He served as the Deputy Minister of Education and the Minister of Jerusalem Affairs and Jewish Tradition.

== Biography ==
Porush was born in Jerusalem. His father Menachem Porush (1916–2010) was one of the longest-serving Knesset members. Meir was educated in a yeshiva. After leaving yeshiva, he served in the IDF, and supports further Haredi participation in military service. Porush lives in Jerusalem with his wife and twelve children.

He was a member of the Boyan Hasidic dynasty, but left the movement due to conflict with the rebbe. He subsequently joined the Vizhnitz Hasidim.

== Political career ==
Before entering the Knesset, Porush was as a member of the Jerusalem City Council for thirteen years. He also served as deputy mayor of Jerusalem. He ran unsuccessfully in the 1983 Jerusalem mayoral election as the Agudat Yisrael nominee. He ran for the mayoralty again in 1989, but was again unsuccessful.

He was first elected to the Knesset in the 1996 elections as an Agudat Yisrael candidate on the United Torah Judaism list, and was appointed Deputy Minister of Housing in Benjamin Netanyahu's first government.

Porush retained his seat in the 1999 elections, and chaired the Knesset inquiry into financial problems of local councils. After Ariel Sharon won a special election for prime minister in 2001, Porush was appointed Deputy Minister of Housing and Construction.

He retained his seat in the 2003 elections. In 2005, he caused controversy by saying that then PM Ariel Sharon reminded him of Benito Mussolini. He was re-elected again in 2006, and ran for mayor of Jerusalem in 2008, losing to the Likud politician Nir Barkat, by 50% to 42%.

Porush retained his Knesset seat in the 2009 elections, and was appointed Deputy Minister of Education in Netanyahu's second government. However, he resigned on 6 February 2011, as part of a seat rotation agreement. He was re-elected again in 2013 and 2015, and was appointed Deputy Minister of Education in Netanyahu's fourth government formed in May 2015.

In March 2016 Porush was reprimanded by the Knesset ethics committee for saying that the "Women of the Wall" should be "thrown to the dogs". Porush responded by saying that if "Women of the Wall" refrained from eating non-kosher food, he would apologize to them.

In May 2016 he resigned from the Knesset to allow Ya'akov Asher to take his place as part of the rotation agreement between the parties in United Torah Judaism. He returned to the Knesset in 2019, but resigned his seat in June 2020 after being appointed Deputy Minister of Education, allowing Yitzhak Pindrus to take his seat.

Porush resigned the Minister of Jerusalem Affairs and Jewish Tradition portfolio and returned to the Knesset in July 2025, replacing Moshe Roth.

Porush recommended in late September 2026 that the party hold primaries, reflecting on Shlomi Emunim's holding of internal elections at the local level, including the Jerusalem elections which were held in 2024.
