= Agudat Yisrael =

Agudat Yisrael אגודת ישראל
- Leader: Yitzhak Goldknopf; Ya'akov Litzman; Yitzhak-Meir Levin; Yehuda Meir Abramowicz; Avraham Yosef Shapira; Menachem Porush
- Founded: 1912; 114 years ago
- Newspaper: Hamodia
- Ideology: Haredi interests; Orthodox Halakha; Religious conservatism; Social conservatism; Haredi non-Zionism
- Political position: Right-wing
- Religion: Haredi Judaism (Hasidism)
- International affiliation: World Agudath Israel
- Alliances: United Religious Front (1949–1951); Religious Torah Front (1955–1960, 1973–1977); United Torah Judaism (current)
- Knesset: 1 / 120
- Most MKs: 5 (1988)

Election symbol
- ג

Website
- smart-click.co.il/agodat_israel/

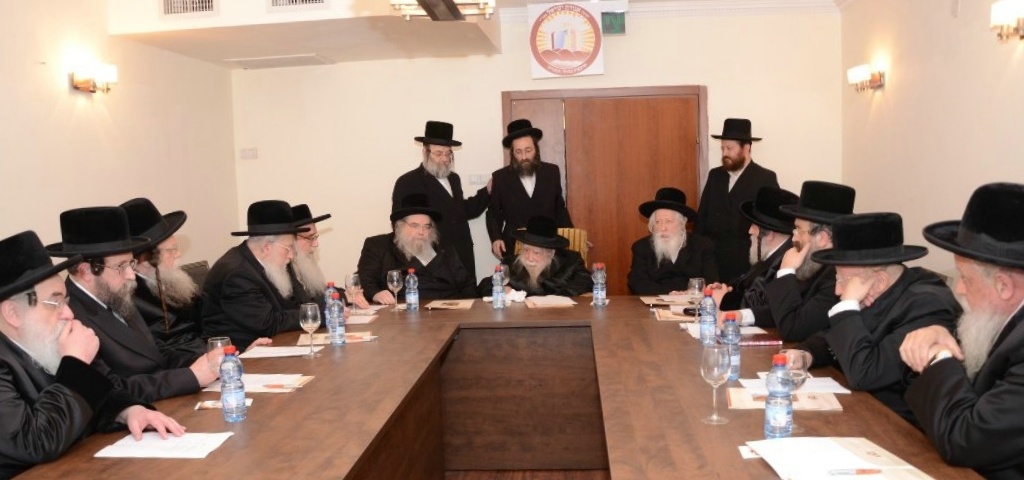
Agudat Yisrael council meeting

Agudat Yisrael (Hebrew: אֲגוּדָּת יִשְׂרָאֵל, romanized: Agudath Israel, lit. 'Union of Israel'; Ashkenazi Hebrew: Agudas Yisroel) is a Haredi Jewish political party in Israel. It began as a political party representing Haredi Jews in Poland, originating in the Agudath Israel movement in Upper Silesia. It later became the party of many Haredim in Israel. It was the umbrella party for many, though not all, Haredi Jews in Israel until the 1980s, as it had been during the British Mandate of Palestine.

Since the 1980s it has become a predominantly Hasidic party, though it often combines with the Degel HaTorah non-Hasidic Ashkenazi Haredi party for elections and coalition-forming (although not with the Sephardi and Mizrahi Haredi party Shas). When so combined, they are known together as United Torah Judaism.

== History ==
Kashrut Badatz of Agudat Yisrael

When political Zionism began to emerge in the 1890s, and recruit supporters in Europe and America, it was opposed by many Orthodox Jews, who believed the Jewish state would emerge from divine intervention. World Agudath Israel was founded in Kattowitz, German Empire (now Katowice, Poland), in 1912, to provide an umbrella organization for observant Jews who opposed the Zionist movement.

In Palestine, Agudat Yisrael was established as a branch of this movement, to provide opposition to the organised Zionist Jewish community (the "New Yishuv", as opposed to the traditionalist, religious "Old Yishuv"). One of its most authoritative spokesmen against the formation of a Jewish State, the Dutch poet Jacob Israël de Haan, was assassinated by the Haganah in 1924. In 1933, it entered into an agreement with the Jewish Agency in Palestine, according to which Agudat Yisrael would receive 6.5% of the immigration permits. It was led at the time by Rabbi Moshe Blau (brother of the head of Neturei Karta, Rabbi Amram Blau). In the wake of the Holocaust, anti-Zionist rabbis who led Agudat Israel recognised the great utility of a Jewish state, and it became non-Zionist, rather than anti-Zionist. It did not actively participate in the creation of Israel, but it ceased its opposition to it. Eventually, on the eve of the Israeli Declaration of Independence (1948), Agudat Yisrael yielded to pressure from the Zionist movement, and since that time, it has been a participant in most Israeli governments. Over time, the movement realized that its more active participation in politics would come with benefits, and it agreed to become a coalition partner of several Israeli governments. However, its original reservations about a secular government influenced its decision to refuse cabinet positions.

Agudat Yisrael originally had a mixed Hasidic and "Litvish" (Lithuanian-style Haredi) membership. However, in the 1980s, Rabbi Elazar Shach, leader of Israel's Litvish community and their pre-eminent rosh yeshiva ("yeshiva dean"), split from the party. He created the new Degel HaTorah ("Flag of the Torah") party. Most of the Litvish community left Agudah to join Degel HaTorah, leaving Agudah with primarily Hasidic members. Rabbi Shach had earlier assisted Rabbi Ovadiah Yosef in splitting from Agudah to create a Sephardic Haredi party known as Shas. Agudat Yisrael and Degel HaTorah have not always agreed with each other about policy matters; however, over the years, the two parties have co-operated and united as a voting bloc to win the maximum number of seats in the Knesset, since many extra votes can be wasted if certain thresholds are not attained under Israel's proportional representation parliamentary system. The two parties chose to function and be listed under the name of United Torah Judaism (UTJ, Hebrew Yahadut HaTorah).

When both parties joined the government coalition of Prime Minister Ariel Sharon in 2004, the UTJ union was broken due to rivalries. For the 2006 Israel legislative election, Agudat Yisrael and Degel HaTorah once again put their differences aside, and officially revived their United Torah Judaism alliance to win the maximum number of seats in the 17th Knesset.

Though Agudat Yisrael has never elected more than ten members in the Knesset, it has often played crucial roles in the formation of Israel's coalition governments because Israel's system of proportional representation allows small parties to wield the balance of power between the larger parties. This political leverage has been used to obtain funding for yeshivas and community institutions, to obtain a de facto exemption for Haredi Yeshiva students from military service, and to pass legislation regarding the observance of the Shabbat and kashrut dietary regulations, sometimes to the consternation of secular Israelis.

== Religious and political leadership ==
Political power is vested in the Hasidic Rebbes of Ger, Belz, Vizhnitz, and Boston.

In addition, policy decisions of Agudat Yisrael are ratified by its Council of Torah Sages, which includes several other prominent Hasidic leaders and scholars, many being the leading rabbis from the main constituent groups. When participating in government coalitions, the party generally refrains from accepting actual cabinet posts. Its positions on Israeli foreign policy and the Palestinian question have been flexible in the past, since the party formally rejects political secular Zionism and does not view such issues ideologically. Therefore, it has been able to participate in both Likud- and Labor-led coalitions. In more recent years, it has become more sympathetic to the settler movement in the West Bank, and thus more security-conscious on military issues affecting Israel's survival. Agudat Yisrael supported Ariel Sharon's unilateral disengagement plan of 2005.

In 1948, Rabbi Yehuda Meir Abramowicz was appointed as General Secretary.

Rabbi Meir Porush, as well as Yaakov Litzman, and Yisrael Eichler, from the Hasidic courts of Ger and Belz, respectively, have represented the party in Israel's Knesset. Another long-time Agudat MK is Rabbi Shmuel Halpert, a member of the court of Vizhnitz.

== Election results ==
=== Knesset ===
Election	Leader	Votes	%	Seats	+/–	Government
1949	Yitzhak-Meir Levin	part of United Religious Front		2 / 120	New	Coalition
1951	Yitzhak-Meir Levin	13,799	2.01 (#9)	3 / 120	▲1	Coalition (1951–1952)
1951	Yitzhak-Meir Levin	13,799	2.01 (#9)	3 / 120	▲1	Opposition (1952–1955)
1955	Yitzhak-Meir Levin	part of Religious Torah Front		3 / 120	0	Opposition
1959	Yitzhak-Meir Levin	part of Religious Torah Front		3 / 120	Steady	Opposition
1961	Yitzhak-Meir Levin	37,178	3.69 (#8)	4 / 120	0	Opposition
1965	Yitzhak-Meir Levin	39,795	3.30 (#7)	4 / 120	0	Opposition
1969	Yitzhak-Meir Levin	44,002	3.22 (#4)	4 / 120	0	Opposition
1973	Shlomo Lorincz	part of Religious Torah Front		3 / 120	▼1	Opposition
1977	Yehuda Meir Abramowicz	58,652	3.36 (#6)	4 / 120	▲1	Coalition
1981	Avraham Yosef Shapira	72,312	3.73 (#4)	4 / 120	0	Coalition
1984	Avraham Yosef Shapira	36,079	1.74 (#11)	2 / 120	▼2	Coalition
1988	Moshe Ze'ev Feldman	102,714	4.50 (#4)	5 / 120	▲3	Coalition
1992	Avraham Yosef Shapira	part of United Torah Judaism		3 / 120	▼2	Opposition
1996	Meir Porush	part of United Torah Judaism		2 / 120	▼1	Coalition
1999	Meir Porush	part of United Torah Judaism		3 / 120	0	Coalition
2003	Yaakov Litzman	part of United Torah Judaism		3 / 120	0	Coalition
2006	Yaakov Litzman	part of United Torah Judaism		4 / 120	▲1	Opposition
2009	Yaakov Litzman	part of United Torah Judaism		3 / 120	▼1	Coalition
2013	Yaakov Litzman	part of United Torah Judaism		4 / 120	▲1	Opposition
2015	Yaakov Litzman	part of United Torah Judaism		3 / 120	▼1	Coalition
Apr 2019	Yaakov Litzman	part of United Torah Judaism		4 / 120	▲1	Snap election
Sep 2019	Yaakov Litzman	part of United Torah Judaism		4 / 120	0	Snap election
2020	Yaakov Litzman	part of United Torah Judaism		3 / 120	▼1	Coalition
2021	Yaakov Litzman	part of United Torah Judaism		3 / 120	0	Opposition
2022	Yitzhak Goldknopf	part of United Torah Judaism		3 / 120	0	Coalition (2022–2025)
2022	Yitzhak Goldknopf	part of United Torah Judaism		3 / 120	0	Opposition (2025–2026)
2026	Yitzhak Goldknopf	part of United Torah Judaism		1 / 120	▼2	TBA

== See also ==
- Agudath Israel of America
- Agudas Israel (Latvia)
- Hasidim and Mitnagdim
