= List of presidents of Israel =

Presidents of Israel

This article lists the presidents of the Provisional State Council and Presidents of Israel since the adoption of the Israeli Declaration of Independence in 1948.

The President of Israel is the de jure head of state of Israel. The position is largely an apolitical and ceremonial role, and is not considered a part of any Government Branch. The President's ceremonial roles include signing every law (except those pertaining to the President's powers) and international or bilateral treaty, ceremonially appointing the Prime Minister, confirming and endorsing the credentials of ambassadors, and receiving the credentials of foreign diplomats. The President also has several important functions in government. The President is the only government official with the power to pardon or commute prisoners. The President appoints the governor of the Bank of Israel, the president of the national emergency relief service Magen David Adom, and the members and leaders of several institutions. The President also ceremonially appoints judges to their posts after their selection.

== Presidents of the Provisional State Council (1948–1949) ==
Colour key
Mapai	General Zionists

The Declaration of the Establishment of the State of Israel was proclaimed on 14 May 1948 by David Ben-Gurion, the Executive Head of the World Zionist Organization and Chairman of the Jewish Agency for Palestine.

As President of the Provisional State Council, the interim legislative and executive authority that served until the formation of Israel's provisional government, Chaim Weizmann served as the de facto head of state until his election as President of Israel in 1949.

Presidents							Elected (term)
No.	Portrait	Name (Lifespan)	Term of office		Time in office	Political party (at time of appointment)	Elected (term)
1		David Ben-Gurion דָּוִד בֶּן־גּוּרִיּוֹן (1886–1973)	14 May 1948	16 May 1948	2 days	Mapai	—
2		Chaim Azriel Weizmann חַיִּים עַזְרִיאֵל וַיְצְמָן (1874–1952)	16 May 1948	17 February 1949	277 days	General Zionists	—

== Presidents of Israel (1949–present) ==
Colour key
General Zionists	Mapai	Alignment/Labor	Likud	Kadima

Eleven people have served as President of Israel, four of whom have served two consecutive terms. Another, Yitzhak Ben-Zvi, was elected to three consecutive terms, although he died in office soon after the beginning of his third term.

Isaac Herzog has been serving as the 11th President of Israel since 2021.

President							Elected (term)
No.	Portrait	Name (Lifespan)	Term of office		Time in office	Political party (at time of appointment)	Elected (term)
1		Chaim Azriel Weizmann חַיִּים עַזְרִיאֵל וַיְצְמָן (1874–1952)	17 February 1949	25 November 1951	3 years, 266 days	General Zionists	1949 (1st)
1		Chaim Azriel Weizmann חַיִּים עַזְרִיאֵל וַיְצְמָן (1874–1952)	25 November 1951	9 November 1952	3 years, 266 days	General Zionists	1951 (2nd)
–		Yosef Sprinzak יוֹסֵף שְׂפְּרִינְצָק (1885–1959); Acting	9 November 1952	16 December 1952	37 days	Mapai	–
2		Yitzhak Ben-Zvi יִצְחָק בֵּן צְבִי (1884–1963)	16 December 1952	30 October 1957	10 years, 128 days	Mapai	1952 (3rd)
2		Yitzhak Ben-Zvi יִצְחָק בֵּן צְבִי (1884–1963)	30 October 1957	30 October 1962	10 years, 128 days	Mapai	1957 (4th)
2		Yitzhak Ben-Zvi יִצְחָק בֵּן צְבִי (1884–1963)	30 October 1962	23 April 1963	10 years, 128 days	Mapai	1962 (5th)
–		Kadish Luz קַדִּישׁ לוּז (1895–1972); Acting	23 April 1963	21 May 1963	10 years, 31 days	Mapai	–
3		Zalman Shazar זַלְמָן שַׁזָּ״ר (1889–1974)	21 May 1963	26 March 1968	10 years, 31 days	Mapai	1963 (6th)
3		Zalman Shazar זַלְמָן שַׁזָּ״ר (1889–1974)	26 March 1968	24 May 1973	10 years, 31 days	Mapai	1968 (7th)
4		Ephraim Katzir אֶפְרַיִם קָצִיר (1916–2009)	24 May 1973	29 May 1978	5 years, 5 days	Alignment; Labor	1973 (8th)
5		Yitzhak Navon יִצְחָק נָבוֹן (1921–2015)	29 May 1978	5 May 1983	4 years, 341 days	Alignment; Labor	1978 (9th)
6		Chaim Herzog חַיִּים הֶרְצוֹג (1918–1997)	5 May 1983	23 February 1988	10 years, 8 days	Alignment; Labor	1983 (10th)
6		Chaim Herzog חַיִּים הֶרְצוֹג (1918–1997)	23 February 1988	13 May 1993	10 years, 8 days	Alignment; Labor	1988 (11th)
7		Ezer Weizman עֵזֶר וַיְצְמָן (1924–2005)	13 May 1993	4 March 1998	7 years, 61 days	Labor	1993 (12th)
7		Ezer Weizman עֵזֶר וַיְצְמָן (1924–2005)	4 March 1998	13 July 2000	7 years, 61 days	Labor	1998 (13th)
–		Avraham Burg אַבְרָהָם בּוּרְג (born 1955); Acting	13 July 2000	1 August 2000	19 days	One Israel; Labor	–
8		Moshe Katsav מֹשֶׁה קַצָּב (born 1945)	1 August 2000	1 July 2007	6 years, 334 days	Likud	2000 (14th)
–		Dalia Itzik דַּלְיָה אִיצִיק (born 1952); Acting	1 July 2007	15 July 2007	14 days	Kadima	–
9		Shimon Peres שִׁמְעוֹן פֶּרֶס (1923–2016)	15 July 2007	24 July 2014	7 years, 9 days	Kadima	2007 (15th)
10		Reuven Rivlin רְאוּבֵן רִיבְלִין (born 1939)	24 July 2014	7 July 2021	6 years, 348 days	Likud	2014 (16th)
11		Isaac Herzog יִצְחָק הֶרְצוֹג (born 1960)	7 July 2021	Incumbent (Term expires in 2028)	5 years, 49 days	Labor	2021 (17th)

=== Notes ===
1. David Ben-Gurion preceded Weizmann as Chairman of Provisional State Council, a position which he held from 14 to 16 or 17 May 1948. Weizmann's position remained as Chairman of Provisional State Council until 17 February 1949, when he was declared President by the first Knesset. Upon Weizmann's death on 9 November 1952, Knesset Speaker Yosef Sprinzak took over as Acting President of Israel until the inauguration of Yitzhak Ben-Zvi.
2. Upon Ben-Zvi's death on 23 April 1963, Knesset Speaker Kadish Luz took over as Acting President of Israel until the appointment of Zalman Shazar.
3. After Weizman resigned from the presidency, Knesset Speaker Avraham Burg took over as Acting President of Israel until the appointment of Moshe Katsav.
4. After Katsav began a leave of absence due to police investigations on 25 January 2007, Knesset Speaker Dalia Itzik took over as Acting President of Israel. She continued in this role after Katsav's resignation came into effect on 1 July 2007 until Shimon Peres's inauguration on 15 July.
5. Majalli Wahabi served as Acting President while Dalia Itzik was travelling to the United States. He thus become the first Druze and non-Jew to serve as Acting President of Israel.

== Main biographical data ==
No.	Name	Date of birth	Date of death	Place of birth	Place of death	Place of burial
1	Chaim Weizmann	27 November 1874	9 November 1952	Motal, Russian Empire	Rehovot (Israel)	Rehovot (Israel)
2	Yitzhak Ben-Zvi	24 November 1884	23 April 1963	Poltava, Russian Empire	Jerusalem (Israel)	Har HaMenuchot (Israel)
3	Zalman Shazar	24 November 1889	5 October 1974	Mir, Russian Empire	Jerusalem (Israel)	Mount Herzl (Israel)
4	Ephraim Katzir	16 May 1916	30 May 2009	Kiev, Russian Empire	Rehovot (Israel)	Rehovot Cemetery (Israel)
5	Yitzhak Navon	9 April 1921	7 November 2015	Jerusalem, Mandatory Palestine	Jerusalem (Israel)	Mount Herzl (Israel)
6	Chaim Herzog	17 September 1918	17 April 1997	Belfast, United Kingdom (United Kingdom of Great Britain and Ireland)	Tel Aviv (Israel)	Mount Herzl (Israel)
7	Ezer Weizman	15 June 1924	24 April 2005	Tel Aviv, Mandatory Palestine	Caesarea (Israel)	Or Akiva (Israel)
8	Moshe Katsav	5 December 1945		Yazd, Pahlavi Iran		
9	Shimon Peres	2 August 1923	28 September 2016	Vishnyeva, Poland (Second Polish Republic)	Ramat Gan (Israel)	Mount Herzl (Israel)
10	Reuven Rivlin	9 September 1939		Jerusalem, Mandatory Palestine		
11	Isaac Herzog	22 September 1960		Tel Aviv, Israel		

== See also ==
- List of prime ministers of Israel
- President of Israel
