= List of elections in 1973 =

The following elections occurred in the year 1973.

== Africa ==
- 1973 Cameroonian parliamentary election
- 1973 Equatorial Guinean legislative election
- 1973 Equatorial Guinean constitutional referendum
- 1973 Ethiopian general election
- 1973 Gabonese general election
- 1973 Congolese parliamentary election
- 1973 Republic of the Congo constitutional referendum
- 1973 Senegalese general election
- 1973 Sierra Leonean general election
- 1973 Zambian general election

== Asia ==
- 1973 Bahraini parliamentary election
- 1973 Bangladeshi general election
- 1973 Burmese constitutional referendum
- 1973 Cypriot presidential election
- 1973 Israeli legislative election
- 1973 Israeli municipal elections
- 1973 Israeli presidential election
- 1973 Mongolian parliamentary election
- 1973 Pakistani presidential election
- 1973 Sikkimese general election
- 1973 South Korean legislative election
- 1973 Syrian parliamentary election
- 1973 Syrian constitutional referendum
- 1973 Turkish general election
- 1973 Turkish local elections
- 1973 Turkish presidential election

== Europe ==
- 1973 Andorran parliamentary election
- 1973 Czechoslovak presidential election
- 1973 Danish parliamentary election
- 1973 Irish general election
- 1973 Irish presidential election
- 1973 Monegasque general election
- 1973 Norwegian parliamentary election
- 1973 Portuguese National Assembly election
- 1973 Stockholm municipal election
- 1973 Swedish general election
- 1973 Turkish general election
- 1973 Turkish local elections
- 1973 Turkish presidential election

=== France ===
- 1973 French cantonal elections
- 1973 French legislative election

=== United Kingdom ===
- 1973 Berwick-upon-Tweed by-election
- 1973 Chester-le-Street by-election
- 1973 Dundee East by-election
- 1973 Edinburgh North by-election
- 1973 Glasgow Govan by-election
- 1973 Hove by-election
- 1973 Isle of Ely by-election
- 1973 Lincoln by-election
- 1973 United Kingdom local elections
- 1973 Northern Ireland local elections
- 1973 Manchester Exchange by-election
- 1973 Northern Ireland Assembly election
- 1973 Northern Ireland sovereignty referendum
- 1973 Ripon by-election
- 1973 West Bromwich by-election
- 1973 Westhoughton by-election

==== United Kingdom local ====
- 1973 United Kingdom local elections

===== English local =====
- 1973 Greater London Council election
- 1973 Manchester Council election
- 1973 Trafford Council election
- 1973 Wolverhampton Council election

== North America ==
=== Canada ===
- 1973 Manitoba general election
- 1973 Quebec general election

=== United States ===
==== United States lieutenant gubernatorial ====
- 1973 Virginia lieutenant gubernatorial election

==== United States gubernatorial ====
- 1973 New Jersey gubernatorial election
- 1973 United States gubernatorial elections
- 1973 Virginia gubernatorial election

==== United States House of Representatives ====
- 1973 United States House of Representatives elections
- 1973 Alaska's at-large congressional district special election
- 1973 Maryland's 1st congressional district special election

==== United States mayoral elections ====
- 1973 Allentown mayoral election
- 1973 Atlanta mayoral election
- 1973 Cleveland mayoral election
- 1973 Detroit mayoral election
- 1973 Los Angeles mayoral election
- 1973 Manchester, New Hampshire, mayoral election
- 1973 New York City mayoral election
- 1973 Pittsburgh mayoral election

== Oceania ==
=== Australia ===
- 1973 Armidale state by-election
- 1973 Balcatta state by-election
- 1973 Byron state by-election
- 1973 Hawkesbury state by-election
- 1973 New South Wales state election
- 1973 Murray state by-election
- 1973 Parramatta by-election
- 1973 Australian referendum
- 1973 Semaphore state by-election
- 1973 South Australian state election
- 1973 Victorian state election

== South America ==
- March 1973 Argentine general election
- September 1973 Argentine presidential election
- 1973 Chilean parliamentary election
- 1973 Guyanese general election
- 1973 Paraguayan general election
- 1973 Venezuelan presidential election
