= 1973 Israeli presidential election =

- 10 April 1973

120 members of the Knesset Simple majority of votes needed to win
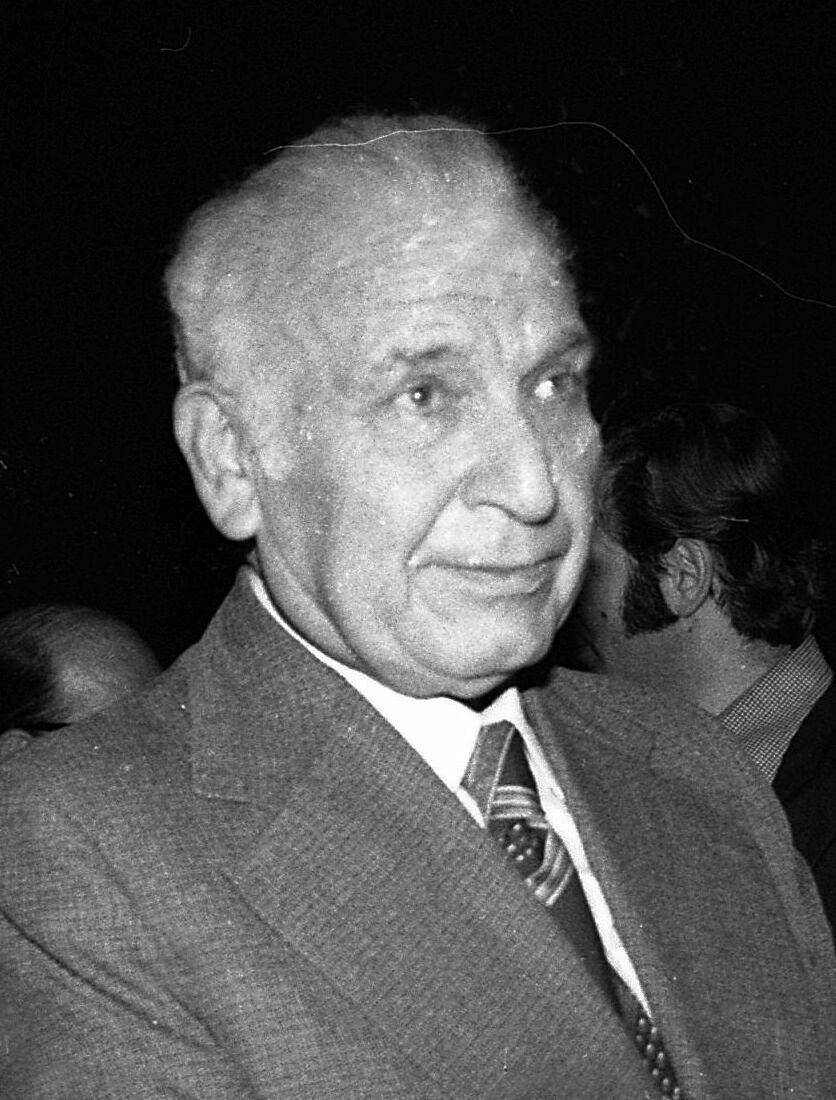

Nominee	Ephraim Katzir	Ephraim Urbach
Party	Alignment	Independent
Electoral vote	66	41
President before election
Zalman Shazar
Alignment
Elected President
Ephraim Katzir
Alignment

An election for President of Israel was held in the Knesset on 10 April 1973. Biophysicist and politician Ephraim Katzir was elected to the position in a secret ballot and took office the same day. He held this position until 1978, when Yitzhak Navon was elected as the new president.

== Results ==
Candidate	Party	Votes	%
Ephraim Katzir	Alignment	66	61.68
Ephraim Urbach	Independent	41	38.32
Total		107	100.00
Valid votes		107	92.24
Invalid votes		0	0.00
Blank votes		9	7.76
Total votes		116	100.00
Registered voters/turnout		120	96.67
