= 2014 Israeli presidential election =

- 10 June 2014

120 members of the Knesset Simple majority of votes needed to win
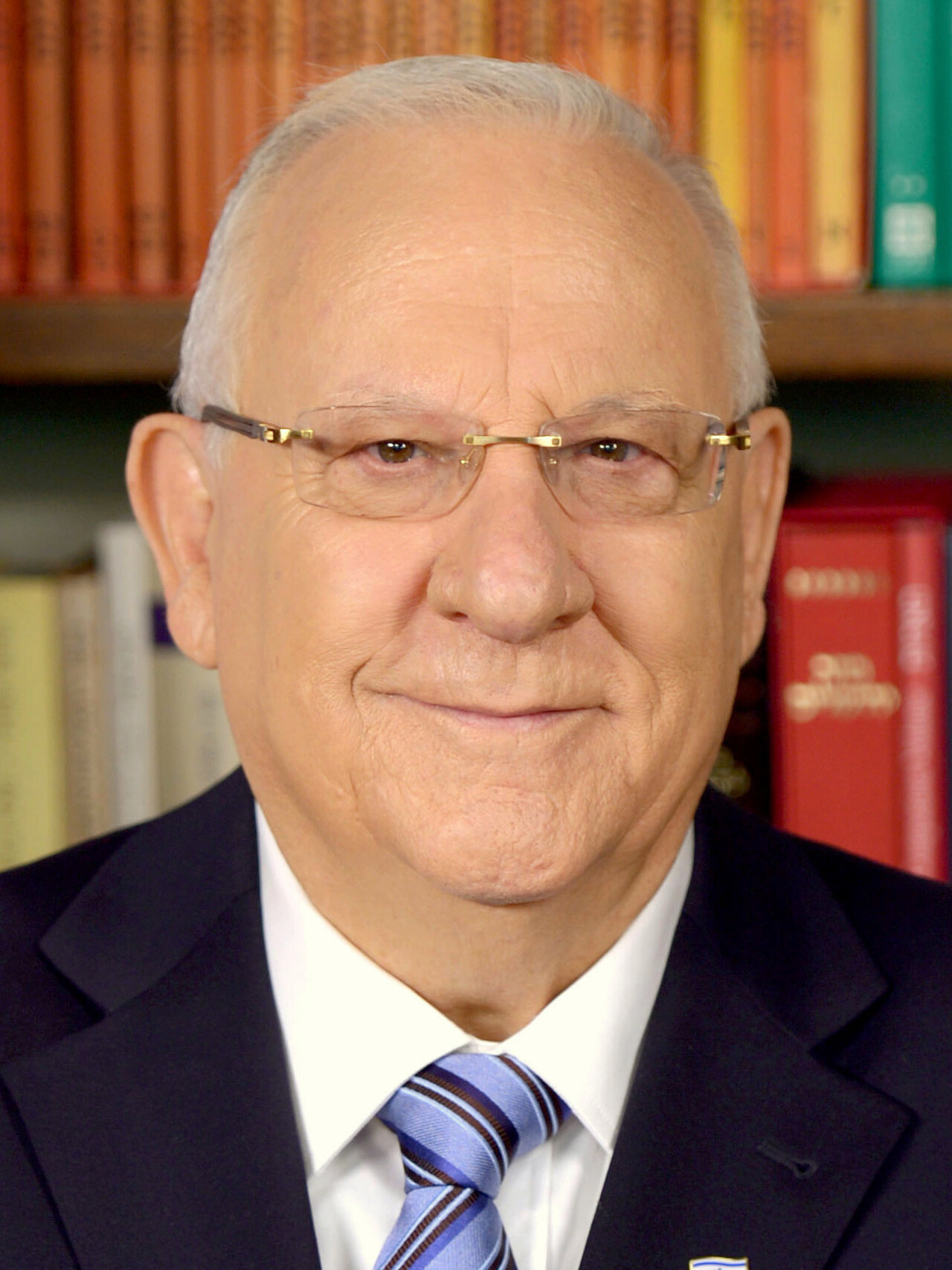

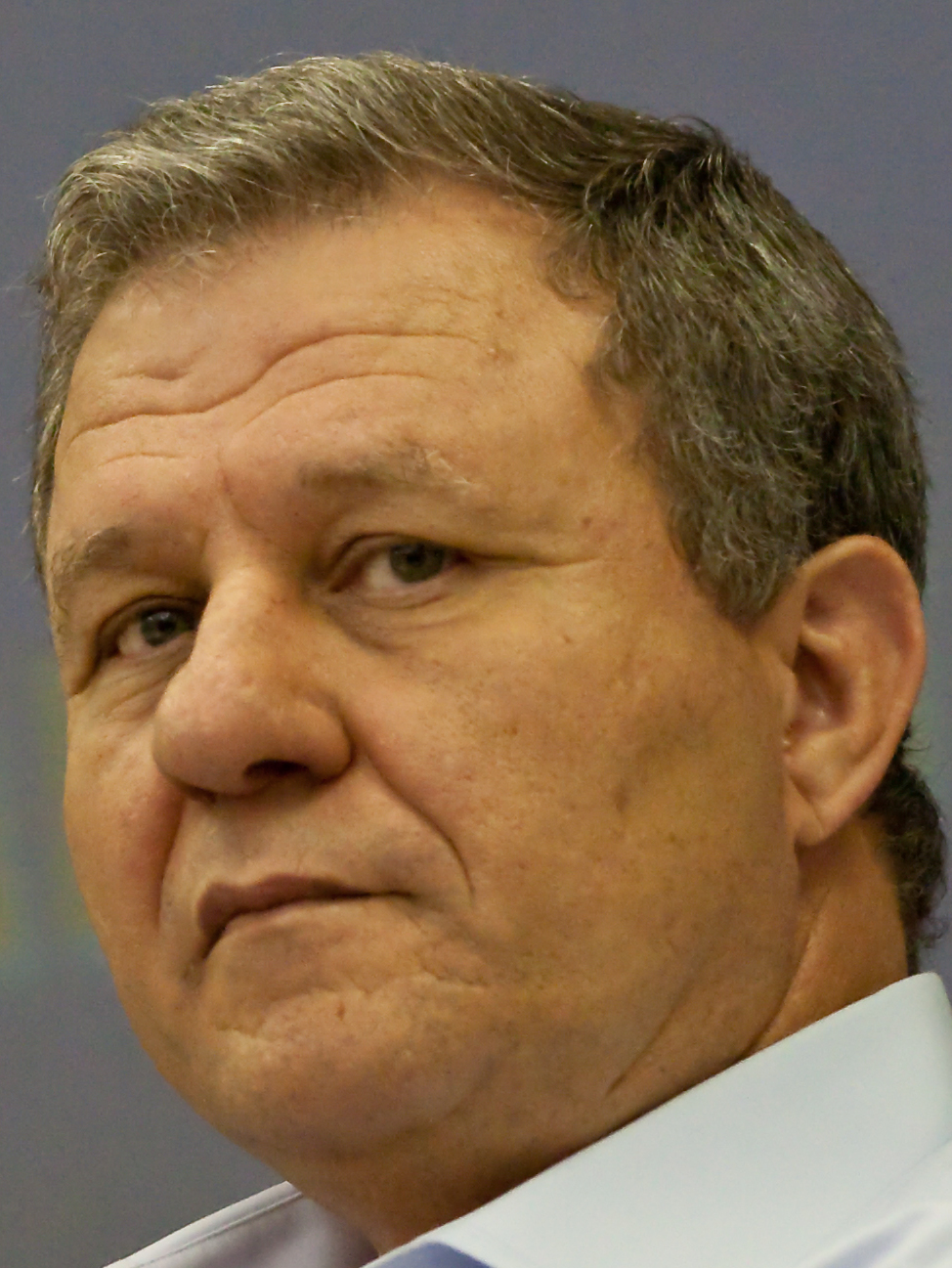
Nominee	Reuven Rivlin	Meir Sheetrit
Party	Likud	Hatnuah
Electoral vote	63	53
President before election
Shimon Peres
Kadima
Elected President
Reuven Rivlin
Likud

Indirect presidential elections were held in Israel on 10 June 2014. The result was a victory for Reuven Rivlin of the Likud party. Rivlin was sworn in as President of Israel on 24 July.

== Background ==
In November 2013, Attorney General Yehuda Weinstein ruled that candidates for the office of President would be barred from raising funds to finance their campaigns.

In January 2014, incumbent President Shimon Peres announced that he would not run for a second term, despite an opinion poll showing 63% of Israelis would prefer him to remain in office. A second term would require change in legislation, as the Basic Law on the presidency permits only one term, following reforms made after the 1998 presidential election to prevent an incumbent being challenged for the presidency.

== Candidates ==
In 2012, an agreement was made between Knesset Speaker Reuven Rivlin and Prime Minister Benjamin Netanyahu that Rivlin would be the party's candidate for the election if Likud won the 2013 Knesset election. Likud subsequently emerged with a parliamentary plurality. However, in February 2014 the Jerusalem Post reported that both Netanyahu and Avigdor Lieberman, a major power in the Likud party, had a poor relationship with Rivlin and had not ruled out backing another candidate.

In February 2014, Binyamin Ben-Eliezer of the Labor Party became the first candidate to receive the required 10 nominations from Knesset members. Four days before the election, Ben-Eliezer was investigated by the police on corruption charges and subsequently withdrew from the race.

Other candidates included Nobel Prize laureate Dan Shechtman, Meir Sheetrit of Hatnuah, Dalia Itzik of Kadima, and former Supreme Court judge Dalia Dorner. Potential candidates who expressed an interest in running but did not receive the written support from ten members of the Knesset needed for nomination included Uzi Landau of Yisrael Beiteinu, Silvan Shalom of Likud, and businessman Yosef Abramowitz.

== Opinion polls ==
Although the public were not able to vote in the election, opinion polls were conducted to determine public support for the candidates.

Pollster	Date	Reuven Rivlin	Dan Shechtman	Binyamin Ben-Eliezer	Dalia Itzik	Dalia Dorner	Meir Sheetrit	Natan Sharansky	Silvan Shalom
Channel 2	6 January 2014	27%	–	16%	5%	–	–	9%	13%
Knesset Channel Panels	23 January 2014	28%	25%	6%	2%	–	–	7%	6%
Haaretz	27 May 2014	31%	22%	10%	4%	11%	4%	–	–

== Results ==
Candidate	Party	First round		Second round	
Candidate	Party	Votes	%	Votes	%
Reuven Rivlin	Likud	44	37.61	63	54.31
Meir Sheetrit	Hatnuah	31	26.50	53	45.69
Dalia Itzik	Kadima	28	23.93		
Dalia Dorner	Independent	13	11.11		
Dan Shechtman	Independent	1	0.85		
Total		117	100.00	116	100.00
Valid votes		117	98.32	116	97.48
Invalid/blank votes		2	1.68	3	2.52
Total votes		119	100.00	119	100.00
Registered voters/turnout		120	99.17	120	99.17
Source: Haaretz

Only 119 votes were cast, as one member of the Knesset, Meir Porush, was abroad.
