= 1968 Israeli presidential election =

- 26 March 1968

120 members of Knesset 61 (Note: less in the instance of abstentions, due to threshold being a simple majority) votes needed to win
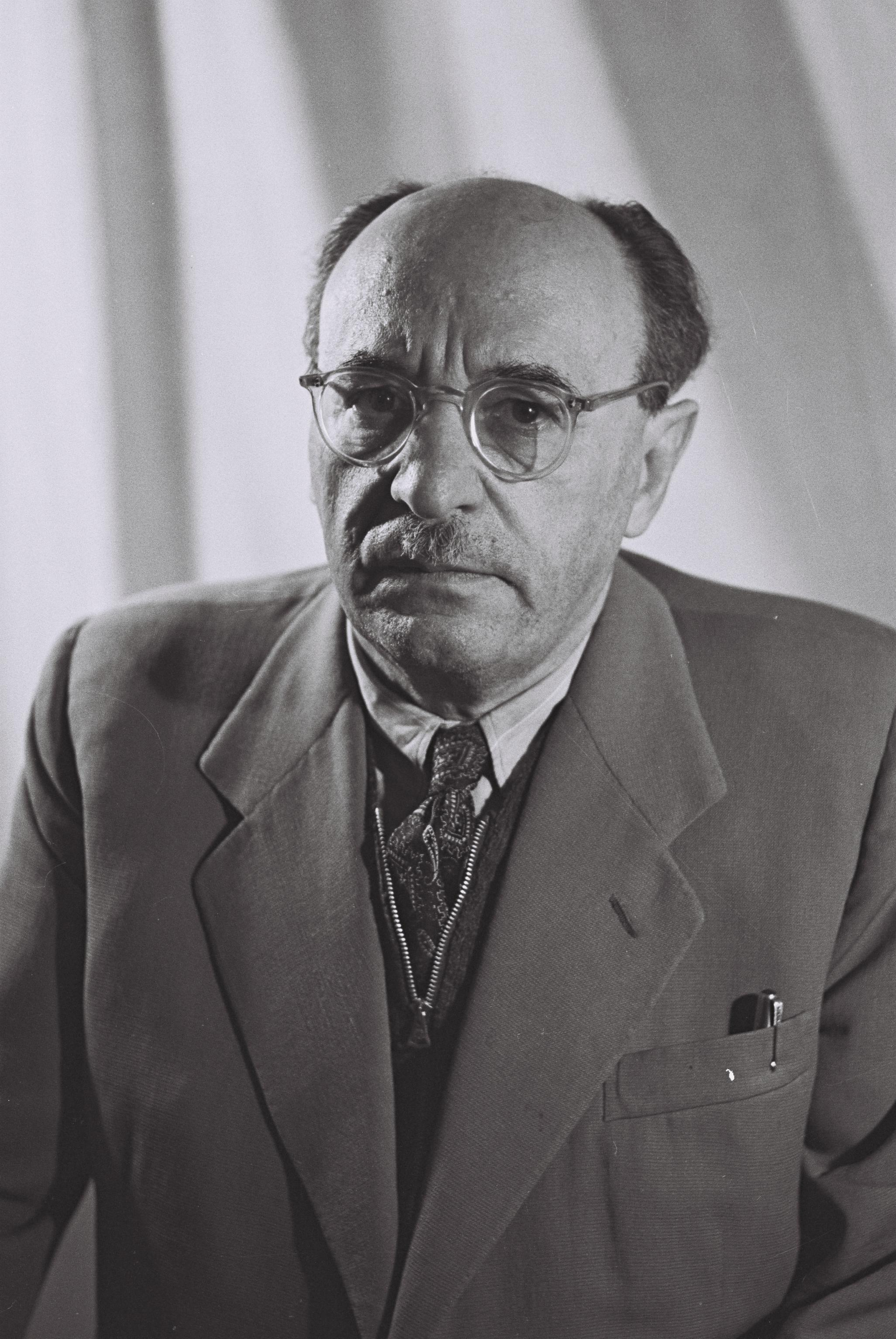
Nominee	Zalman Shazar
Party	Labor
Electoral vote	86

An election for President of Israel was held in the Knesset on 26 March 1968. Incumbent Zalman Shazar, who was elected in 1963 ran unopposed for the position. Shazar took office for his second term the same day. He would hold this position until 1973, when Ephraim Katzir was elected as the new President.

== Results ==
Candidate	Party	Votes	%
Zalman Shazar	Israeli Labor Party	86	100.00
Total		86	100.00
Valid votes		86	78.18
Invalid votes		0	0.00
Blank votes		24	21.82
Total votes		110	100.00
Registered voters/turnout		120	91.67
