= 1978 Israeli presidential election =

- 19 April 1978

120 members of the Knesset Simple majority of votes needed to win
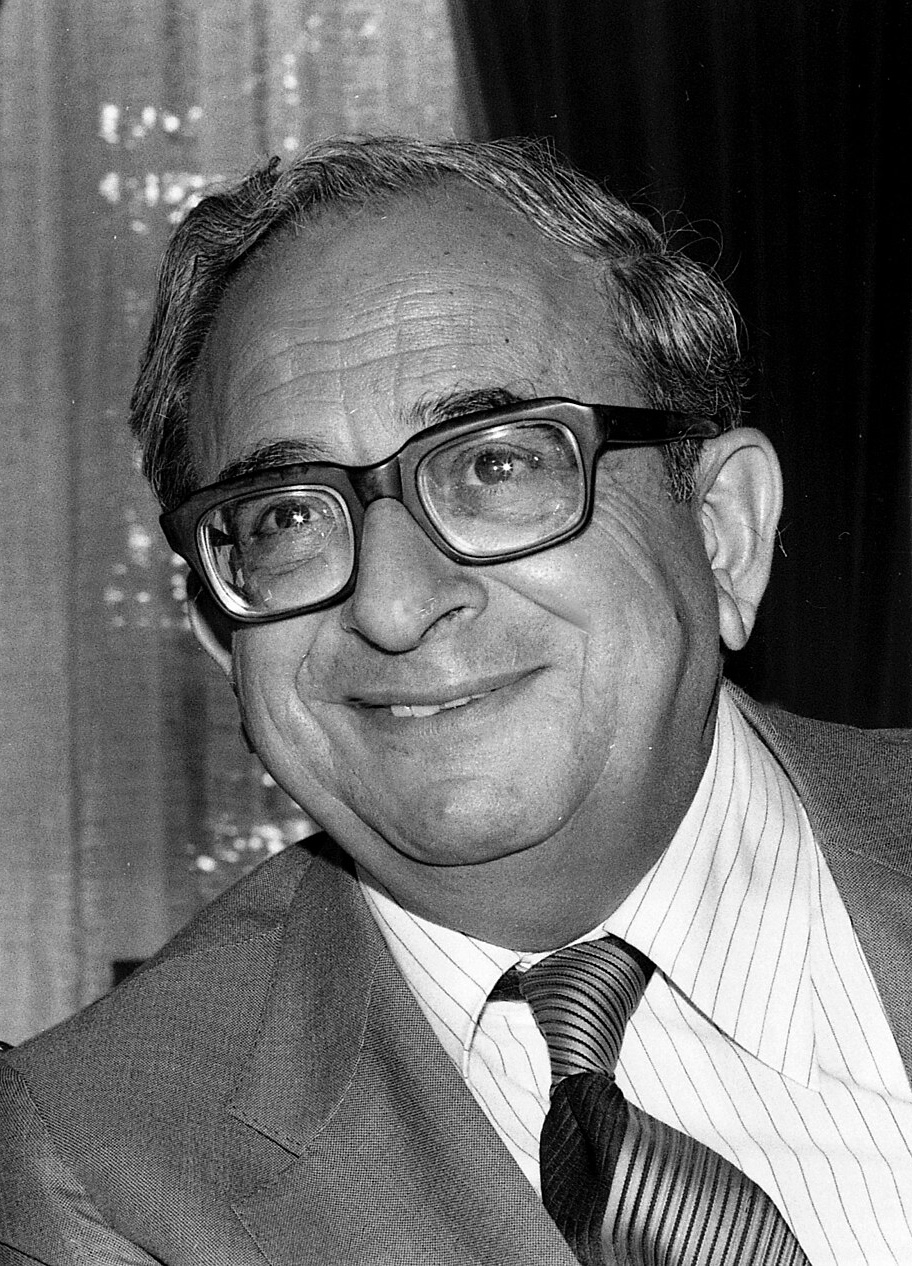
Nominee	Yitzhak Navon
Party	Alignment
Electoral vote	86
President before election
Ephraim Katzir
Alignment
Elected President
Yitzhak Navon
Alignment

An election for President of Israel was held in the Knesset on 19 April 1978 in which Yitzhak Navon was elected as the fifth president of the state of Israel.

== History ==
Ephraim Katzir, who was elected President of Israel in 1973, declined to stand for a second term due to his wife's illness. Yitzhak Navon ran unopposed for the position.

Navon's term began on the day of the election. He held office until 1983, when Chaim Herzog was elected as President.

== Results ==
Candidate	Party	Votes	%
Yitzhak Navon	Alignment	86	100.00
Total		86	100.00
Valid votes		86	78.90
Invalid votes		0	0.00
Blank votes		23	21.10
Total votes		109	100.00
Registered voters/turnout		120	90.83
