= 1973 Andorran parliamentary election =

- 12 December 1973 (first round); 19 December 1973 (second round); 26 December 1973 (third round)
- 12 of the 24 seats in the General Council
Party	Vote %	Seats	+/–
Independents	100	12	0
This lists parties that won seats. See the complete results below.

Parliamentary elections were held in Andorra on 12 December 1973 to elect half of the members of the General Council. In constituencies where not all seats were filled in the first round, a second round was held on 19 December and a third on 26 December.

The elections were held alongside local elections, in which a woman (Carme Travesset in Les Escaldes) was elected to a local council for the first time.

== Electoral system ==
Each parish had four seats in the General Council. The seats were elected on a staggered basis, with two members elected from each parish every two years. In Andorra la Vella parish two members represented the town of Andorra la Vella and two represented Les Escaldes, with one member elected from each every two years.

All candidates had to run on lists of candidates, although voters could split their votes between candidates on different lists. Any candidate receiving a majority of the vote was elected in the first round. If there were remaining seats to fill, a second round was held, in which candidates had to receive a majority of the vote to be elected. If there were still remaining seats to fill, a third round would be held in which the candidate(s) with the most votes would be elected.

== Results ==
Party	First round			Second round			Third round			Total seats
Party	Votes	%	Seats	Votes	%	Seats	Votes	%	Seats	Total seats
Independents			8			3			1	12
Total			8			3			1	12
Source: La Vanguardia, La Vanguardia, La Vanguardia

=== Elected members ===
Constituency	Elected members	Round
Andorra la Vella	Francesc Cerqueda Pasquet	First round
Canillo	Jordi Font Cabanes	Second round
Canillo	Antoni Mandicó Vidal	Third round
Encamp	Serafí Reig Ribó	Second round
Encamp	Gil Torres Palmitjavila	Second round
La Massana	Bonaventura Abellach	First round
La Massana	Guillem Areny	First round
Les Escaldes	Estanislau Sangrà	First round
Ordino	Isidre Baró Cabanes	First round
Ordino	Joan Vila Cirici	First round
Sant Julià de Lòria		First round
Sant Julià de Lòria		First round
Source: La Vanguardia, La Vanguardia, La Vanguardia
