= Guillem Areny =

Andorran politician (died 2020)

Member of the General Council
- Constituency: La Massana
- In office 20 December 1965 – 11 November 1969
- In office 19 June 1973 – 6 November 1981

Personal details
- Died: 30 December 2020

Guillem Areny Areny (died 30 December 2020) was an Andorran politician who served as a member of the Council General from 1966 to 1969, and 1974 to 1981. Prior to his tenure in the General Council he was mayor (cònsol major) of La Massana from 1962 to 1963.

A member of the Teixidó family, Areny rose to become its head and operated multiple businesses in the hotel, construction, and trade sectors. Arney was active in the local politics of La Massana. His son, Guillem Areny Argelich, also served in the General Council.

== Early life ==
Guillem Areny Areny was a member of the Teixidó family, which held large agricultural holdings in Andorra, and later became head of the family. Starting at the age of 9 he attended the blessing of the cattle at Setúria. His son, Guillem Areny Argelich, served in the General Council from 1992 to 1993, and 1997 to 2001.

== Career ==
Areny operated businesses in the hotel, construction, and trade industries. He founded the Andorran Armory, which was impacted by flooding in the Segre basin in 1982.

Areny served as consul of La Massana from 1962 to 1963. From 20 December 1965 to 11 November 1969, and 19 June 1973 to 6 November 1981, Areny was a member of the General Council as a representative for La Massana. He was involved in the construction of the CG-4 highway to Port de Cabús, on the border with Catalonia.

== Death ==
Areny died at age 89 on 30 December 2020, and his funeral was held in La Massana, on January 1, 2021. His funeral had a high level of privacy due to the COVID-19 pandemic.

== Works cited ==
=== Books ===
- Anton, Jordi (2024). Del Consell de la Terra al Consell Genera. General Council. ISBN 9789992052525.

=== News ===
- "Guillem Areny Areny". Diari d'Andorra. Archived from the original on 22 April 2025.
- "Mor l'exconseller general i excònsol de la Massana Guillem Areny Areny". L'altaveu. 31 December 2020. Archived from the original on 22 April 2025.
- "Mor l'excònsol i exconseller general Guillem Areny Areny". Diari d'Andorra. 31 December 2020. Archived from the original on 22 April 2025.
