= 1957 Israeli presidential election =

- 28 October 1957

120 members of the Knesset Simple majority of votes needed to win
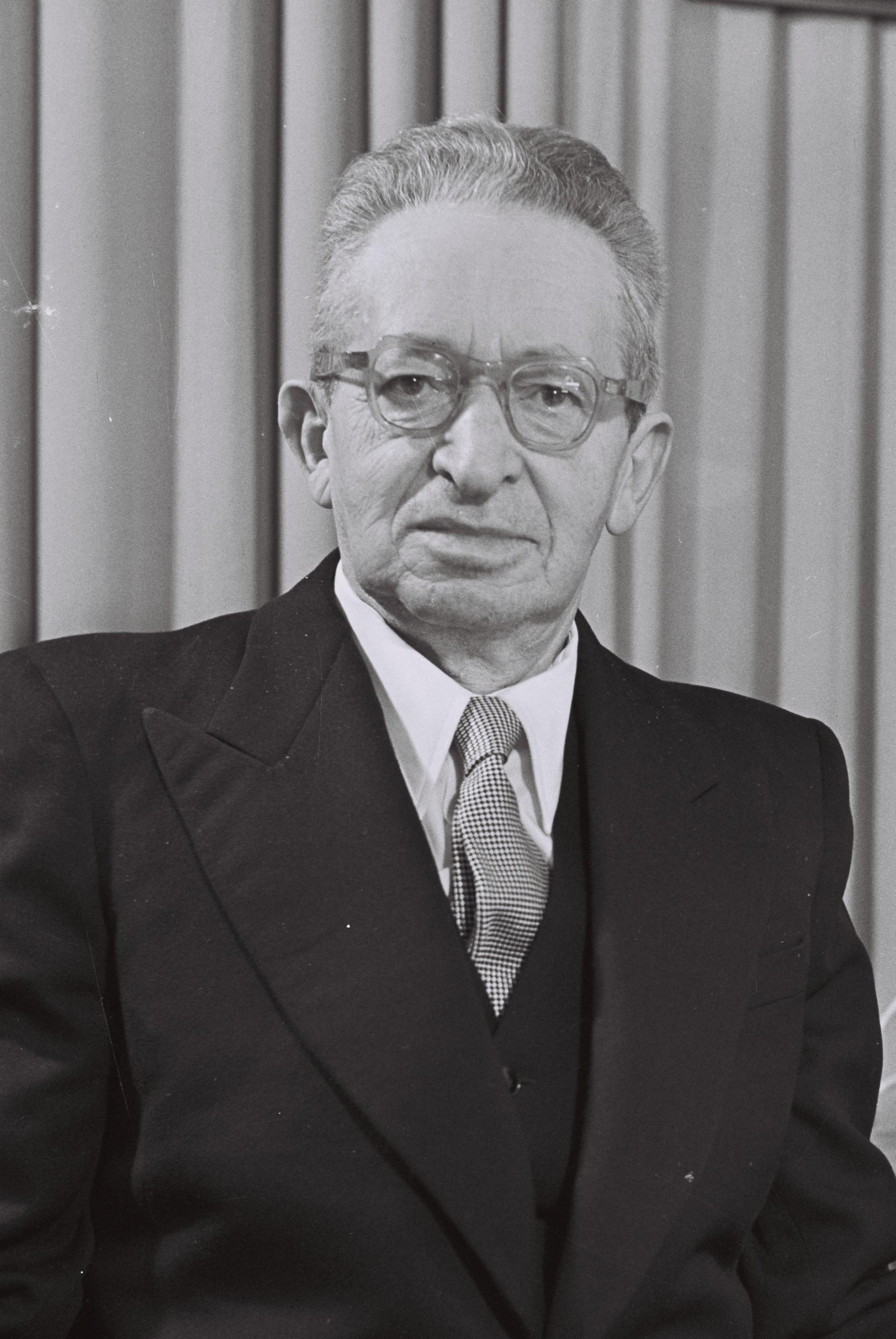
Nominee	Yitzhak Ben-Zvi
Party	Mapai
Electoral vote	76
President before election
Yitzhak Ben-Zvi
Mapai
Elected President
Yitzhak Ben-Zvi
Mapai

An election for President of Israel was held in the Knesset on 28 October 1957 following the end of Yitzhak Ben-Zvi's five-year term in office. Ben-Zvi stood again, and it was suggested that Yosef Yoel Rivlin (father of future president Reuven Rivlin) would run against him as a representative of Herut. However, in the end Rivlin did not participate in the election.

Although Ben-Zvi was the only candidate, a vote was still held. He was re-elected with 76 of the 94 ballots cast; the other 18 votes were blank ballots. 26 Knesset members did not vote.

Ben-Zvi's second term began on the day of the election.

== Results ==
Candidate	Party	Votes	%
Yitzhak Ben-Zvi	Mapai	76	100.00
Total		76	100.00
Valid votes		76	80.85
Invalid votes		0	0.00
Blank votes		18	19.15
Total votes		94	100.00
Registered voters/turnout		120	78.33
