= 2000 Israeli presidential election =

- 31 July 2000

120 members of the Knesset Simple majority of votes needed to win
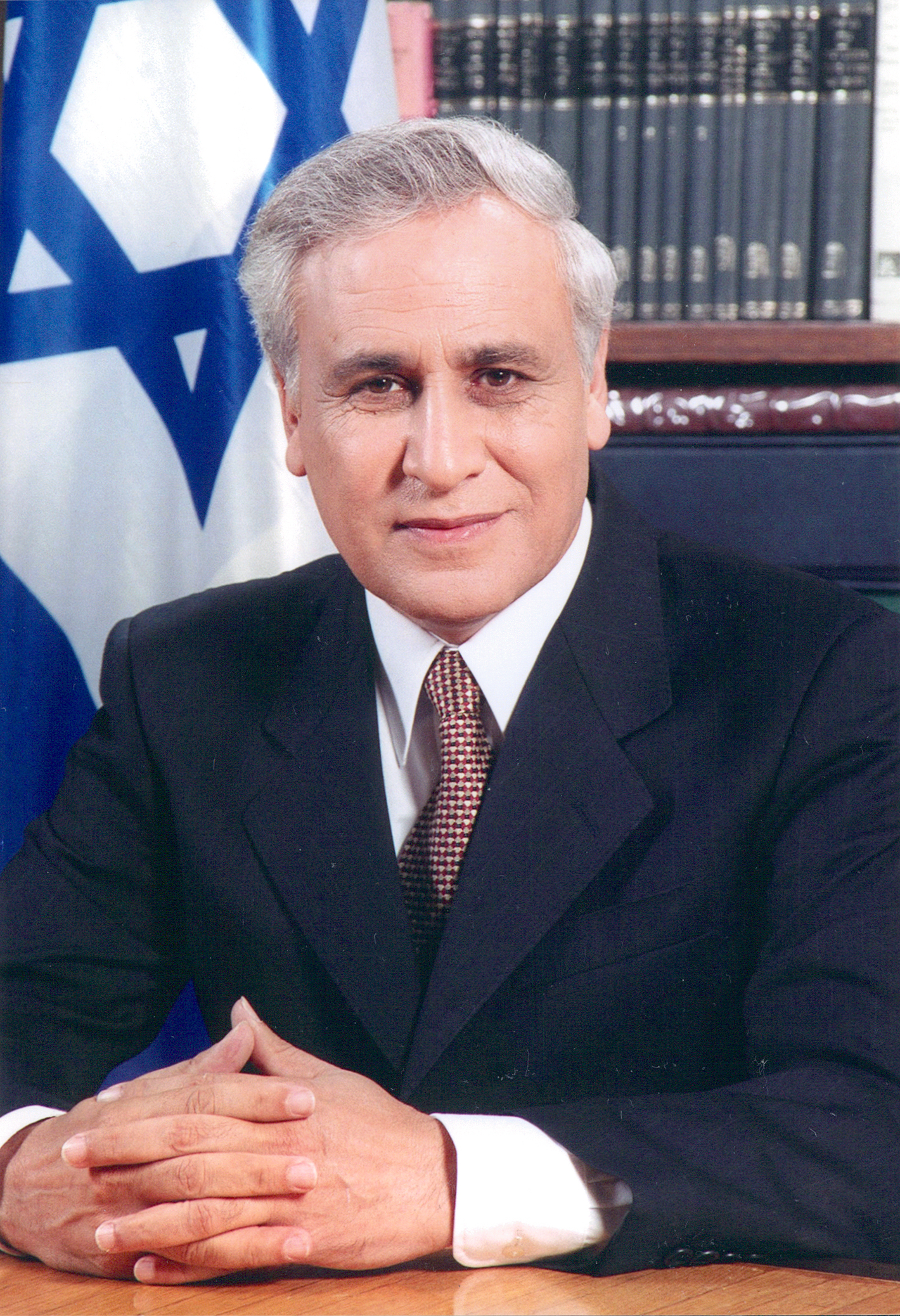

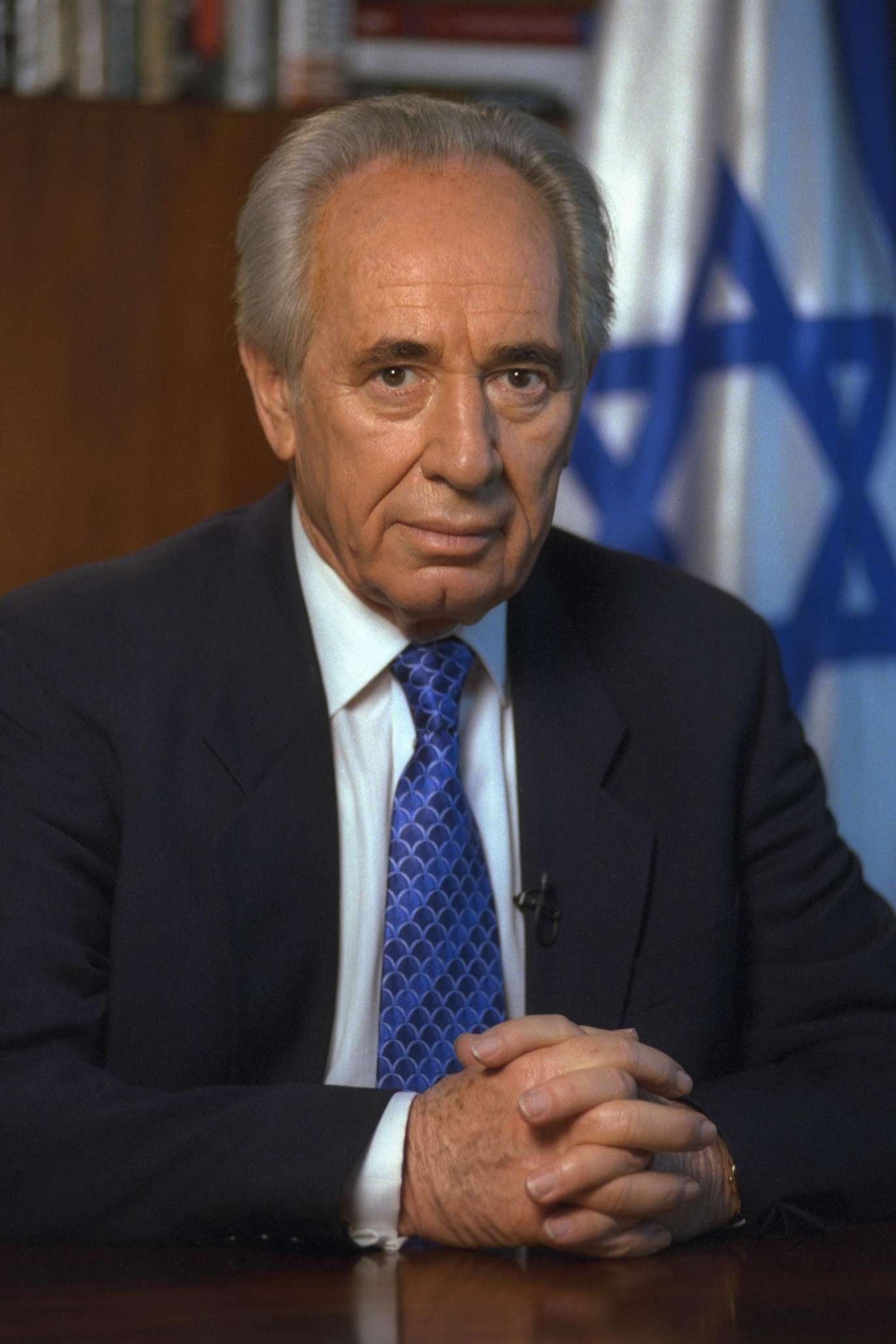
Nominee	Moshe Katsav	Shimon Peres
Party	Likud	One Israel
First round	60; 50.28%	57; 48.72%
Second round	63; 52.50%	57; 47.50%
President before election
Ezer Weizman
Labor
Elected President
Moshe Katsav
Likud

An election for President of Israel was held in the Knesset on 31 July 2000, following Ezer Weizman's resignation.

== History ==
Moshe Katsav, a Likud politician, ran against Shimon Peres, a previous Prime Minister of Israel. In a surprising upset, the Knesset elected Katsav, by 63 to 57. Katsav assumed office as President of Israel on 1 August 2000. He was the first Israeli president sworn in for a seven-year term, as well as the first candidate from the right-wing Likud party to be elected to the office.

== Results ==
Candidate	Party	First round		Second round	
Candidate	Party	Votes	%	Votes	%
Moshe Katsav	Likud	60	51.28	63	52.50
Shimon Peres	One Israel	57	48.72	57	47.50
Total		117	100.00	120	100.00
Valid votes		117	97.50	120	100.00
Invalid votes		0	0.00	0	0.00
Blank votes		3	2.50	0	0.00
Total votes		120	100.00	120	100.00
Registered voters/turnout		120	100.00	120	100.00
