= 1973 Stockholm municipal election =

Swedish local election

A Stockholm municipal election was held on 16 September 1973 to allocate the 101 seats of the Stockholm City Council (Stockholms stadsfullmäktige) amongst the various Swedish political parties using a party-list proportional representation system. The election was held concurrently with a Swedish parliamentary election. Voter turnout for the municipal election in Stockholm was 88.6%.

== Results ==
Party	Votes		Seats	
Party	#	%	#	+ –
Social Democrats; Socialdemokraterna (s)	183,321	39.4%	42	–4
Moderate Party; Moderaterna (m)	107,935	23.2%	23	+7
Centre Party; Centerpartiet (c)	65,247	14.0%	15	+5
People's Party; Folkpartiet (fp)	54,328	11.7%	12	–10
Left Party Communists; Vänsterpartiet kommunisterna(v)	41,626	8.9%	9	+2
Christian Democrats; Kristdemokraterna (kd)	5252	1.1%	0	±0
Other parties	7,934	1.7%	0	±0
Total	465,643	—	101	±0
Invalid ballots	6,839			

== See also ==
- Elections in Sweden
