= 1963 Israeli presidential election =

- 21 May 1963

120 members of the Knesset Simple majority of votes needed to win
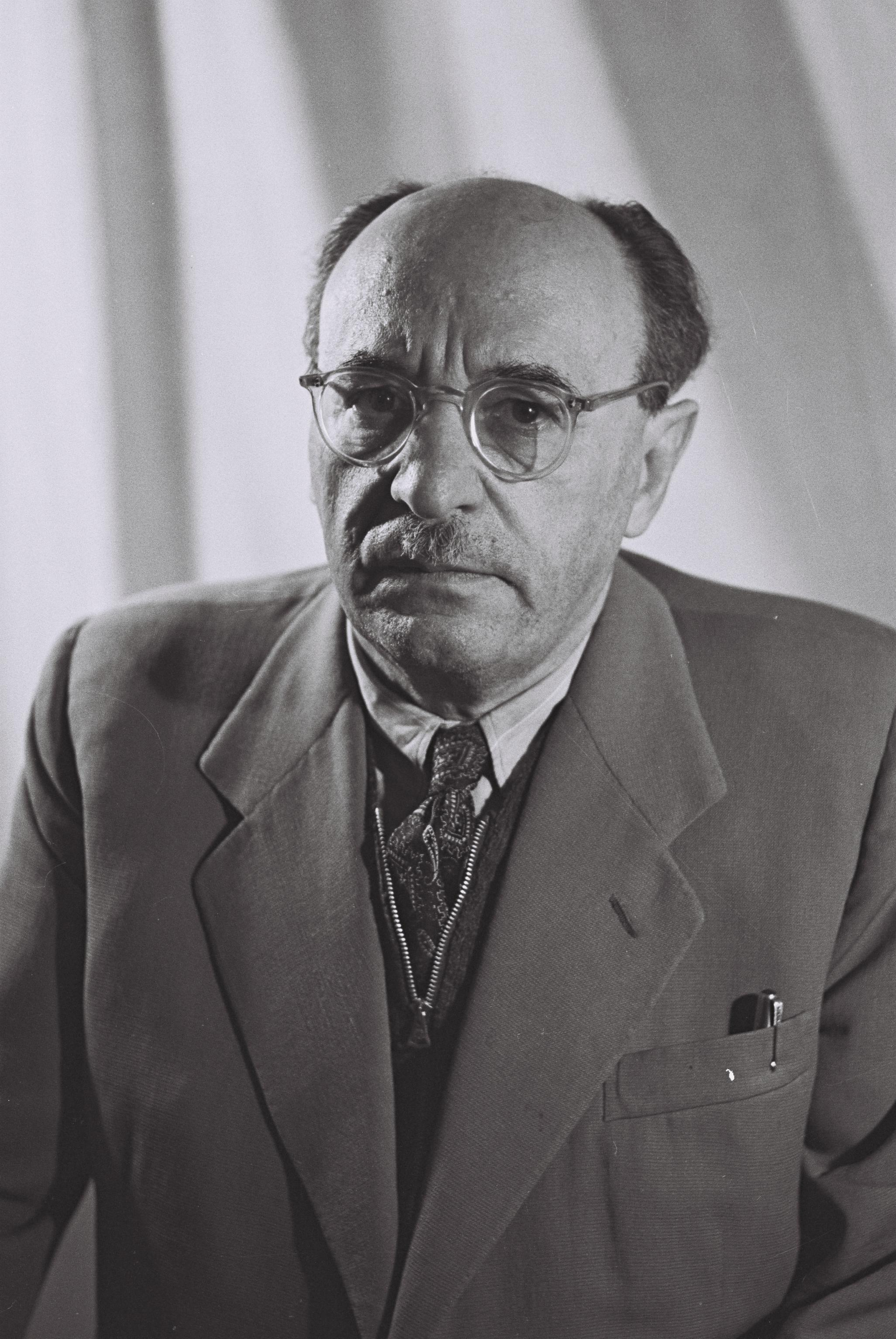

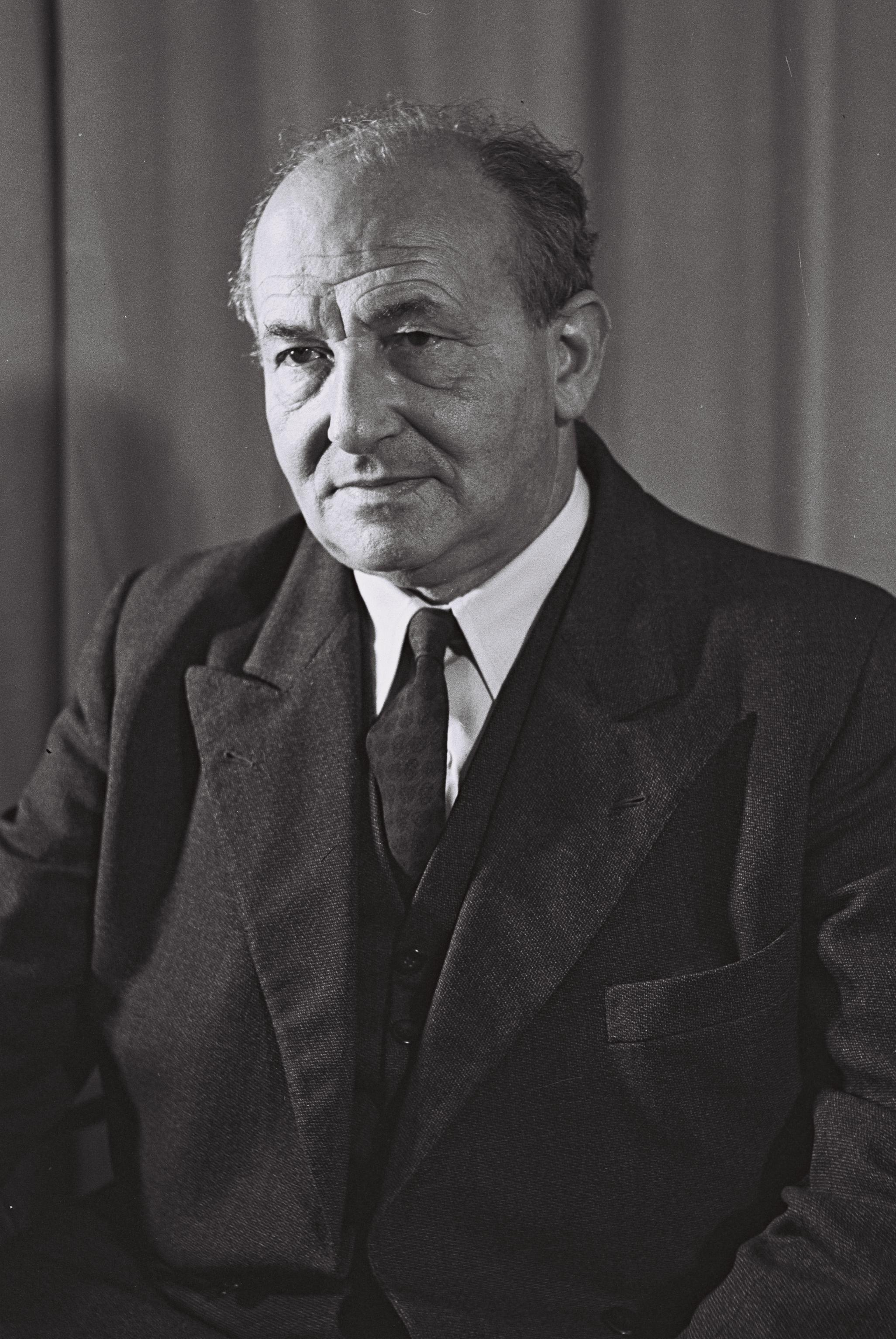
| Nominee | Zalman Shazar | Peretz Bernstein |
| Party | Mapai | Liberal |
| Electoral vote | 67 | 33 |
President before election
Yitzhak Ben-Zvi
Mapai
Elected President
Zalman Shazar
Mapai

An election for President of Israel was held in the Knesset on 21 May 1963 following the death of the president Yitzhak Ben-Zvi on 23 April. Author, poet and politician Zalman Shazar was elected to the office.

Between Ben-Zvi's death and Shazar taking office on the day of the vote, Knesset speaker Kadish Luz served as acting president.

== Candidates ==
There were two candidates:

- Zalman Shazar: A member of the Knesset for Mapai, and former Minister of Education and editor of the Davar newspaper.
- Peretz Bernstein: A member of the Knesset for the Liberal Party, former Minister of Trade and Industry and a signatory of the Israeli declaration of independence.

== Results ==
The election was settled in the first round, with Shazar gaining an outright majority of votes in the 120-seat Knesset.

| Candidate | Party | Votes | % |
|---|---|---|---|
| Zalman Shazar | Mapai | 67 | 67.00 |
| Peretz Bernstein | Israeli Liberal Party | 33 | 33.00 |
| Total | | 100 | 100.00 |
| Valid votes | | 100 | 93.46 |
| Invalid votes | | 0 | 0.00 |
| Blank votes | | 7 | 6.54 |
| Total votes | | 107 | 100.00 |
| Registered voters/turnout | | 120 | 89.17 |
