= 1962 Israeli presidential election =

- 30 October 1962

120 members of the Knesset Simple majority of votes needed to win
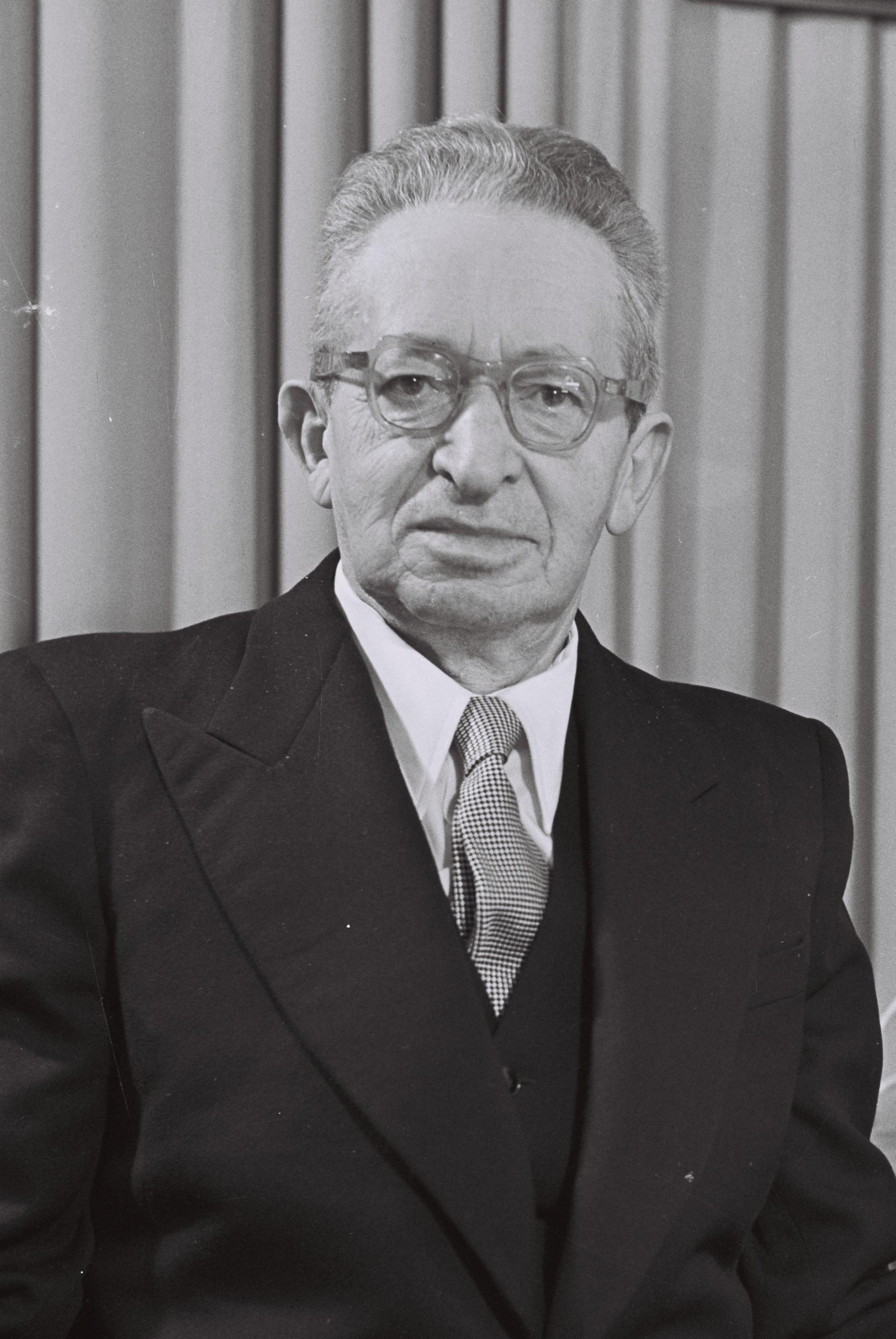
Nominee	Yitzhak Ben-Zvi
Party	Mapai
Electoral vote	62
President before election
Yitzhak Ben-Zvi
Mapai
Elected President
Yitzhak Ben-Zvi
Mapai

An election for President of Israel was held in the Knesset on 30 October 1962. Two-term incumbent President Yitzhak Ben-Zvi ran unopposed for the office. He was re-elected with 62 of the 104 votes cast.

== Results ==
Candidate	Party	Votes	%
Yitzhak Ben-Zvi	Mapai	62	100.00
Total		62	100.00
Valid votes		62	59.62
Invalid votes		0	0.00
Blank votes		42	40.38
Total votes		104	100.00
Registered voters/turnout		120	86.67
