= 1993 Israeli presidential election =

- 24 March 1993

120 members of the Knesset Simple majority of votes needed to win
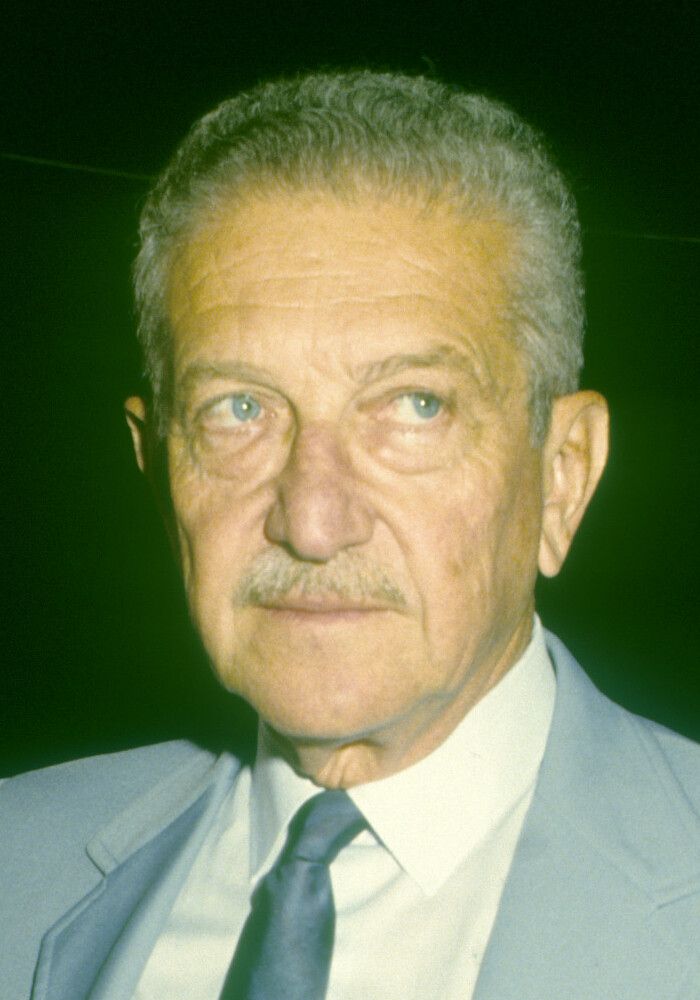

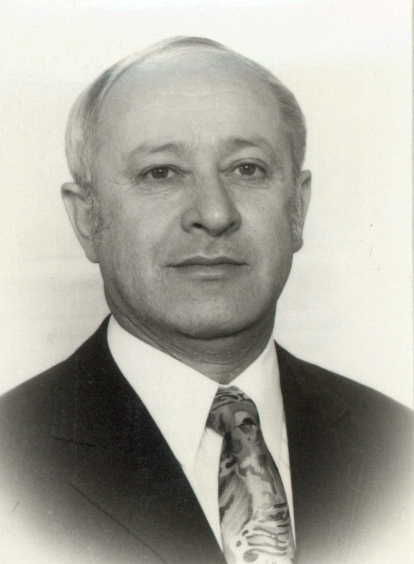
Nominee	Ezer Weizman	Dov Shilansky
Party	Labor	Likud
Electoral vote	66	53
President before election
Chaim Herzog
Labor
Elected President
Ezer Weizman
Labor

An election for President of Israel was held in the Knesset on 24 March 1993, following the end of Chaim Herzog's second five-year term in office.

== History ==
Ezer Weizman, former Israeli Air Force commander and Defense Minister of Israel, ran against Dov Shilansky, a Likud politician. The Knesset elected Weizman, by a majority of 66 to 53 to serve as the next President of Israel. He assumed office on May 13, 1993.

== Results ==
Candidate	Party	Votes	%
Ezer Weizman	Israeli Labor Party	66	55.46
Dov Shilansky	Likud	53	44.54
Total		119	100.00
Valid votes		119	99.17
Invalid votes		0	0.00
Blank votes		1	0.83
Total votes		120	100.00
Registered voters/turnout		120	100.00
