= 1951 Israeli presidential election =

- 19 November 1951

120 members of the Knesset Simple majority of votes needed to win
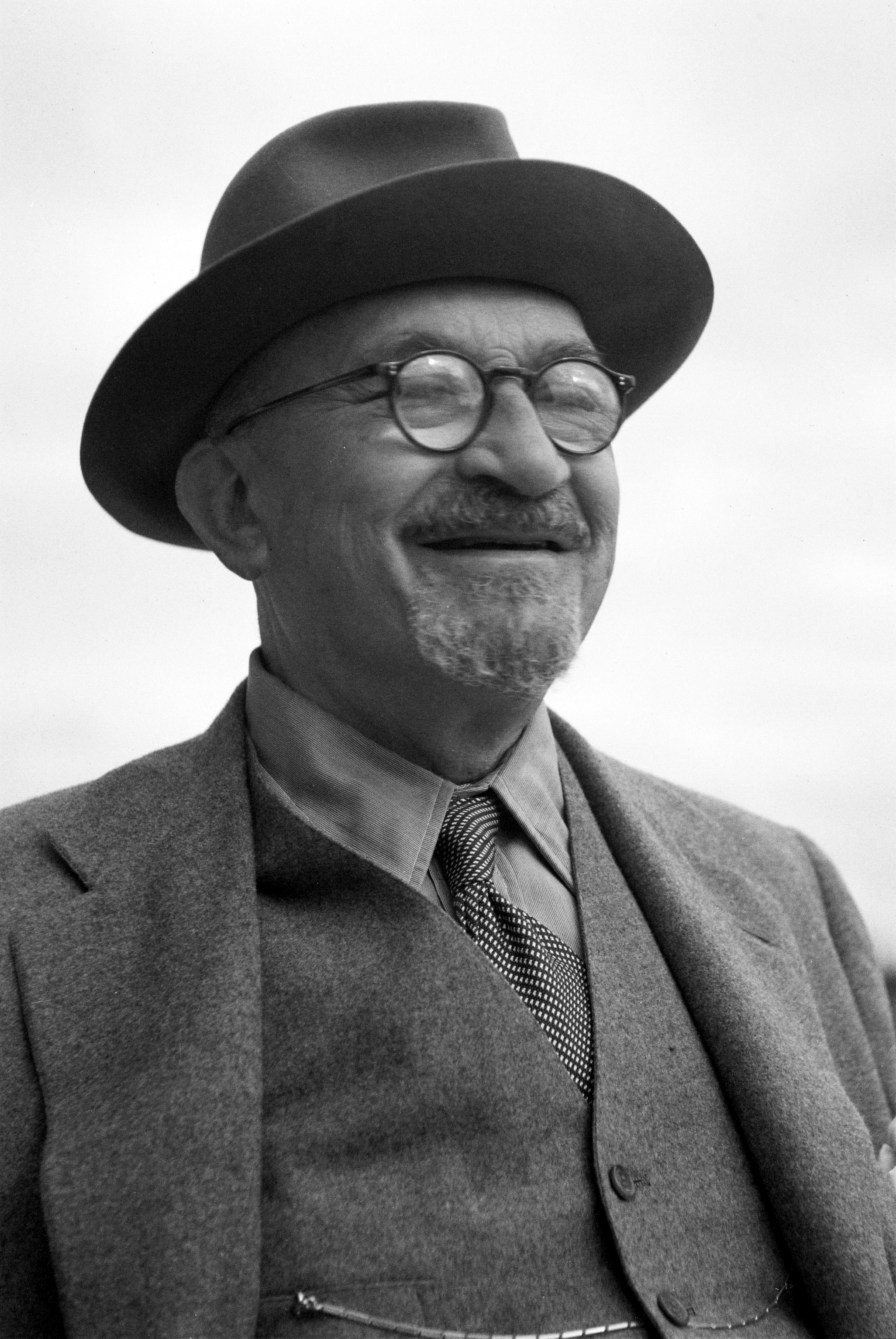
Nominee	Chaim Weizmann
Party	General Zionists
Electoral vote	85
President before election
Chaim Weizmann
Elected President
Chaim Weizmann

An election for President of Israel was held in the Knesset on 19 November 1951 following the 1951 Knesset elections and the formation of the third government (at the time, the length of the president's term was linked to that of the Knesset). Despite his poor health, Weizmann stood again, and there were no opposing candidates. Although Weizmann was the only person to stand, a vote was still held. The result was 85 votes for, 11 against and three blank ballots. 21 MKs did not vote.

He was sworn in for his second term at his home in Rehovot on 25 November.

Weizmann died a year later, and an early election was held to choose the country's second president.

== Results ==
Candidate	Party	Votes	%
Chaim Weizmann	General Zionists	85	88.54
Against		11	11.46
Total		96	100.00
Valid votes		96	96.97
Invalid votes		0	0.00
Blank votes		3	3.03
Total votes		99	100.00
Registered voters/turnout		120	82.50
