= 1973 Turkish local elections =

← 1968	9 December 1973	1977 →
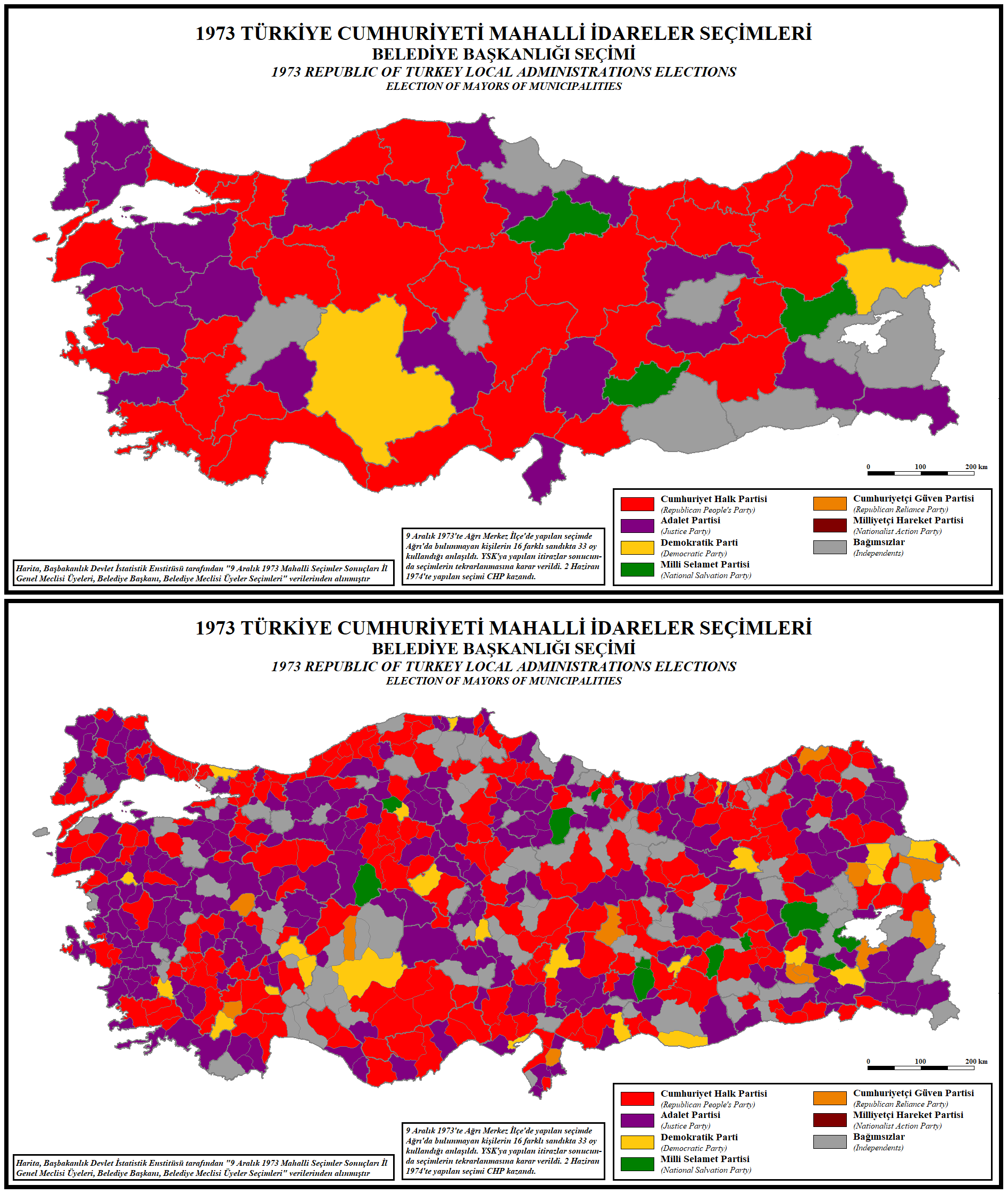

Local elections were held in Turkey on 9 December 1973. In the elections, both the mayors and the local parliaments (Turkish: İl Genel Meclisi) were elected. The figures presented below are the results of the local parliament elections.

== Results ==
=== Provincial assemblies ===
Party	Votes	%
Republican People's Party	3,708,687	37.09
Justice Party	3,232,365	32.32
Democratic Party	1,075,304	10.75
National Salvation Party	620,140	6.20
Republican Reliance Party	289,683	2.90
Nationalist Movement Party	133,089	1.33
Unity Party	41,092	0.41
Nation Party	8,967	0.09
Independents	890,878	8.91
Total	10,000,205	100.00

=== Mayors ===
Province	Party
Adana	CHP
Adapazarı	CHP
Adıyaman	MSP
Afyonkarahisar	IND.
Ağrı	CHP
Amasya	AP
Ankara	CHP
Antalya	CHP
Artvin	CHP
Aydın	AP
Balıkesir	AP
Bilecik	CHP
Bingöl	CHP
Bitlis	IND.
Bolu	AP
Burdur	CHP
Bursa	AP

Province	Party
Çanakkale	CHP
Çankırı	AP
Çorum	CHP
Denizli	CHP
Diyarbakır	CHP
Edirne	AP
Elazığ	AP
Erzincan	AP
Erzurum	CHP
Eskişehir	CHP
Gaziantep	CHP
Giresun	CHP
Gümüşhane	CHP
Hakkâri	AP
Hatay	AP
Isparta	AP
Istanbul	CHP

Province	Party
İzmir	CHP
İzmit	CHP
Kars	AP
Kastamonu	CHP
Kayseri	CHP
Kırklareli	AP
Kırşehir	CHP
Konya	DP
Kütahya	AP
Malatya	CHP
Manisa	AP
Mersin	CHP
Kahramanmaraş	AP
Mardin	IND.
Muğla	CHP
Muş	MSP
Nevşehir	IND.

Province	Party
Niğde	AP
Ordu	AP
Rize	CHP
Samsun	IND.
Siirt	AP
Sinop	AP
Sivas	CHP
Tekirdağ	AP
Tokat	MSP
Trabzon	CHP
Tunceli	IND.
Şanlıurfa	IND.
Uşak	CHP
Van	IND.
Yozgat	CHP
Zonguldak	CHP
