= 1988 Israeli presidential election =

- 23 February 1988

120 members of the Knesset Simple majority of votes needed to win
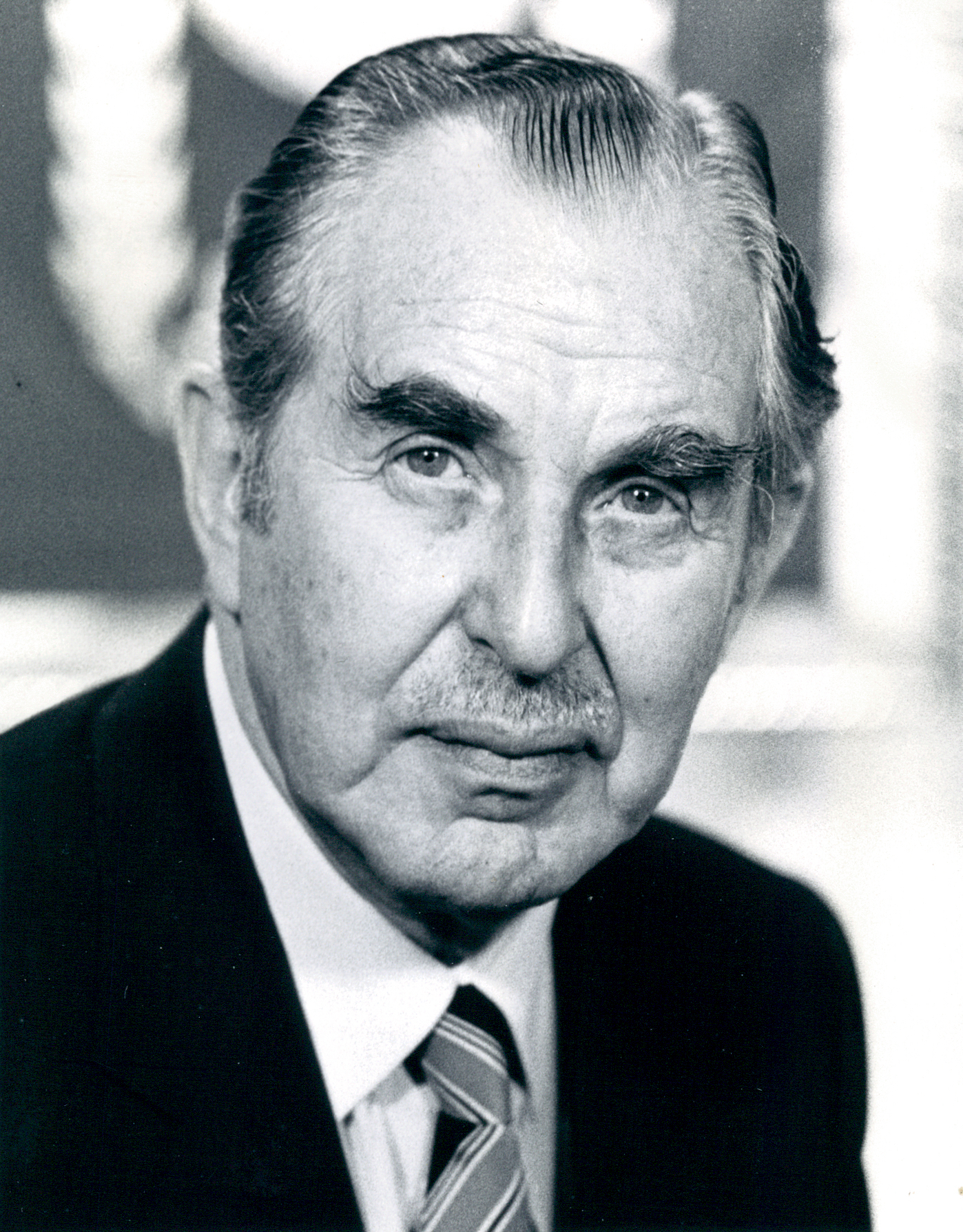
Nominee	Chaim Herzog
Party	Alignment
Electoral vote	82
President before election
Chaim Herzog
Alignment
Elected President
Chaim Herzog
Alignment

An election for President of Israel was held in the Knesset on 23 February 1988.

Chaim Herzog stood for re-election as President of Israel as an unopposed candidate.

== Results ==
Candidate	Party	Votes	%
Chaim Herzog	Alignment	82	98.80
Against		1	1.20
Total		83	100.00
Valid votes		83	96.51
Invalid votes		1	1.16
Blank votes		2	2.33
Total votes		86	100.00
Registered voters/turnout		120	71.67
