= 1973 Syrian constitutional referendum =

- 12 March 1973

Results
Choice	Votes	%
Yes	2,035,215	97.75%
No	46,825	2.25%
Valid votes	2,082,040	99.85%
Invalid or blank votes	3,221	0.15%
Total votes	2,085,261	100.00%
Registered voters/turnout	2,345,625	88.9%

A constitutional referendum was held in Syria on 12 March 1973. The proposed amendments were approved by 97.8% of voters, with turnout reported to be 88.9%.

== Results ==
Choice	Votes	%
For	2,035,215	97.8
Against	46,825	2.3
Invalid/blank votes	3,221	–
Total	2,085,261	100
Source: Nohlen et al.
