= President of Israel =

Head of state

President of the State of Israel
- נשיא מדינת ישראל (Hebrew) رئيس دولة إسرائيل (Arabic)
- Presidential standard

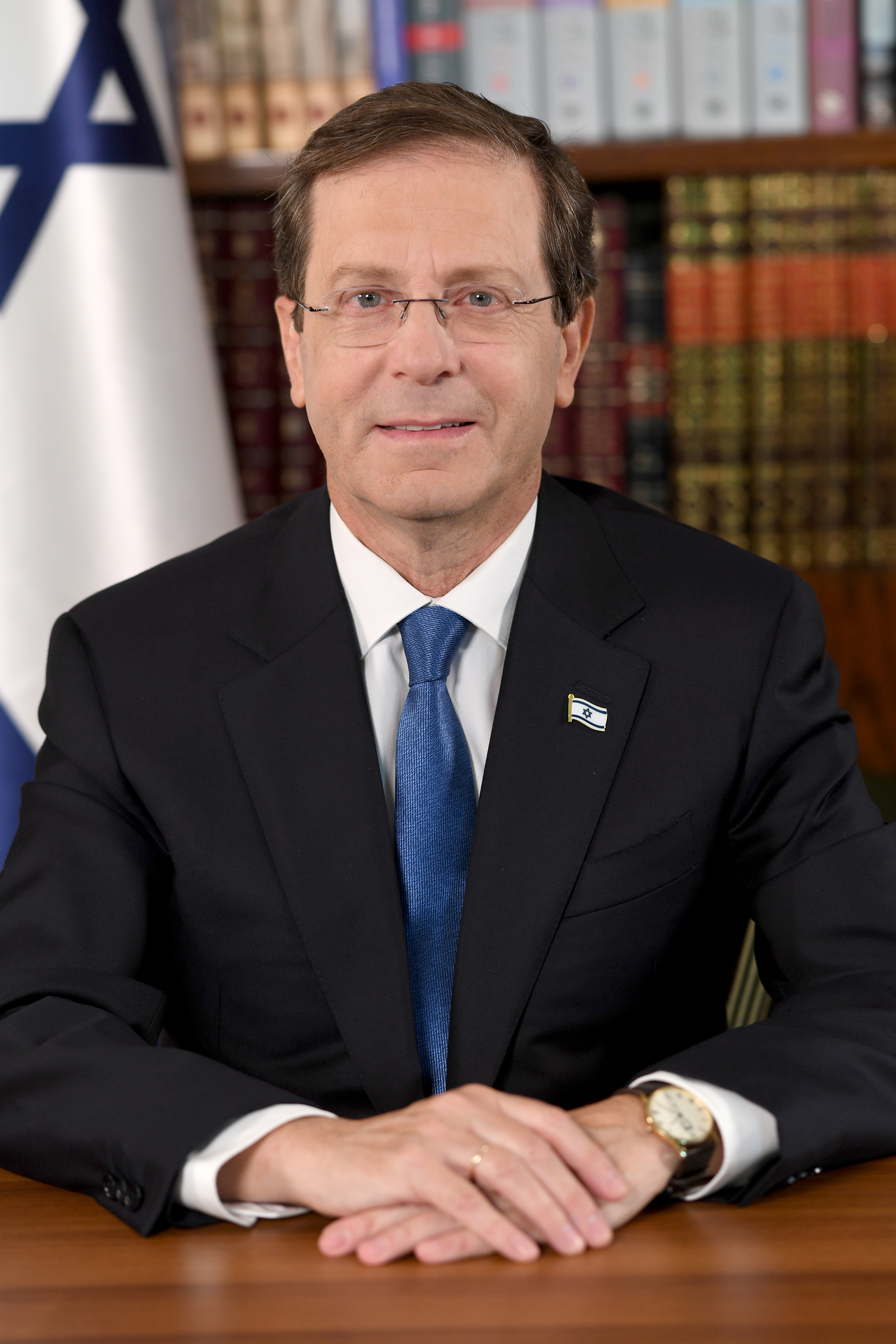
- Incumbent; Isaac Herzog since 7 July 2021
- Style: His Excellency
- Type: Head of state
- Residence: Beit HaNassi
- Appointer: Knesset
- Term length: Seven years, non renewable
- Constituting instrument: Constitution of Israel (1950)
- Inaugural holder: Chaim Weizmann
- Formation: 16 February 1949
- Deputy: Speaker of the Knesset
- Salary: US$173,255 annually
- Website: Official website

The president of the State of Israel (Hebrew: נְשִׂיא מְדִינַת יִשְׂרָאֵל, romanized: Nesi Medinat Yisra'el or נְשִׂיא הַמְדִינָה, Nesi HaMedina; Arabic: رئيس دولة إسرائيل, romanized: Ra'īs Daūlat Isrāʾīl) is the head of state of Israel. The president is mostly, though not entirely, ceremonial; actual executive power is vested in the cabinet led by the prime minister. The incumbent president is Isaac Herzog, who took office on 7 July 2021. Presidents are elected by the Knesset for a single seven-year term.

== Election ==
The president of Israel is elected by an absolute majority in the Knesset, by secret ballot. If no candidate receives an absolute majority of votes in the first or second round of voting, the candidate with the fewest votes is eliminated in each subsequent round, if needed until only two remain. From 1949 to 2000, the president was elected for a five-year term, and was allowed to serve up to two terms in office. Since 2000, the president serves a single seven-year term.

Any Israeli resident citizen is eligible to run for president; as there is no minimum age of candidacy, this would even allow a minor to hypothetically be elected. An age limit of 40 was considered, but rejected by the Knesset as unnecessary. The office falls vacant upon completion of a term, death, resignation, or the decision of three-quarters of the Knesset to remove the president on grounds of misconduct or incapacity. Presidential tenure is not keyed to that of the Knesset, in order to assure continuity in government and the non-partisan character of the office. There is no vice president in the Israeli governmental system. If the president is temporarily incapacitated, or leaves office, the speaker of the Knesset becomes acting president.

The first presidential election took place on 16 February 1949, and the winner was Chaim Weizmann. The second took place in 1951, as at the time presidential terms were linked to the length of the Knesset term (the first Knesset lasted only two years). Another election took place the following year after Weizmann's death.

Since then, elections have been held in 1957, 1962, 1963 (an early election following Yitzhak Ben-Zvi's death), 1968, 1973, 1978, 1983, 1988, 1993, 1998, 2000, 2007, 2014, and 2021. Six elections (1951, 1957, 1962, 1968, 1978, and 1988) have taken place with no opposition candidate, although a vote was still held.

Isaac Herzog was elected 11th President on 2 June 2021. His term started on 9 July.

== Powers and responsibilities ==
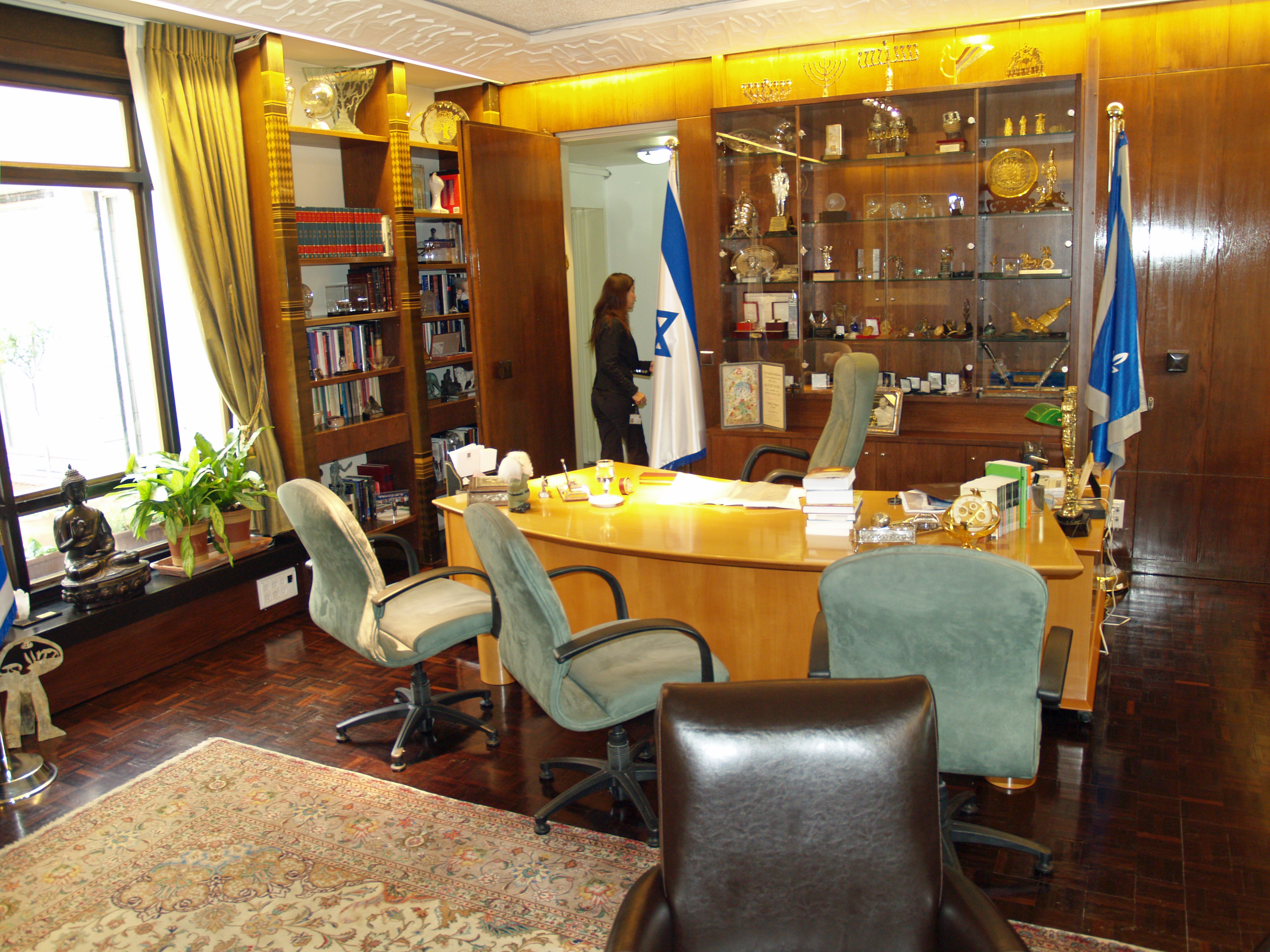
Office of the President of Israel (2007)

The president's fundamental role within the machinery of Israel's uncodified constitution is to "...stand at the head of the State", representing the state of Israel abroad and fostering national unity at home. In this capacity, the president personifies the Israeli state, sanctions the decisions of legitimate constitutional authorities, and guarantees the execution of the public will. Put another way, the presidency serves as a national symbol that seeks to reinforce the core values of the state and to give a voice to the diversity of Israeli society in the performance of its official functions. In these respects, the powers of the president of Israel are generally equivalent to those held by heads of state in other parliamentary democracies and are largely dictated by Basic Law: The Presidency, which was passed in 1964. The Basic Law: The Government also makes provision for the powers of the president in relation to Government formation.

However, unlike heads of state in most other parliamentary republics, the president is not the nominal chief executive. Rather, Basic Law: The Government explicitly vests executive power in the Government (as the Cabinet is officially called), with the prime minister as its head. Likewise, most presidential powers are either exercised in accordance with the strictures of the Basic Laws or on the binding advice of the Government. Indeed, most presidential acts require the countersignature of the prime minister or another minister designated thereby to have legal effect. Correspondingly, the presidency occupies a largely ceremonial role in the conduct of state business. Nevertheless, these constitutional limitations do not extend to the exercise of those discretionary functions comprising the president's reserve powers.

The presidency enjoys immunity from both civil suit and criminal prosecution. Thus, the president is inviolable before the courts of law for any matter concerned with the performance of his or her official functions. The purpose of this substantive immunity is to guarantee the institutional independence of the president from the legislative, executive, and judicial branches. This arrangement effectively makes the presidency – in the words of one constitutional scholar – Israel's "fourth branch of government", allowing successive presidents to exercise nonpartisan influence (as opposed to party-political policymaking power) in their dealings with politicians, to assure the continuity and stability of state institutions, and to hold dialogue with the public on various charitable causes and issues of national import.

=== Routine functions ===
The president signs bills passed by the Knesset into law, except those bills that pertain to the president's powers, and ratifies international or bilateral treaties approved by the Knesset. Acting on the advice of the Government, the president is also charged with endorsing the credentials of Israeli ambassadors abroad and receiving the credentials of foreign diplomats to Israel. Likewise, the president is responsible for appointing a wide array of public officials, including judges, the governor of the Bank of Israel, the president of Magen David Adom, the president of the Israel Academy of Sciences and Humanities, and members of the Council on Higher Education, the National Academy of Science, the Broadcasting Authority, the Authority to Rehabilitate Prisoners, the Chief Rabbinical Council and the Wolf Foundation. Judges are appointed by the president pursuant to the nominations of the Judicial Selection Committee. All other presidential appointments are made on the advice of the Government.

=== Reserve powers ===
In addition to routine functions exercised on the advice of the Government or in accordance with the strictures of the Basic Laws, the president enjoys personal discretion in matters of Government formation, parliamentary dissolution, and granting pardons. These functions comprise the reserve powers of the presidency.

==== Formation of the Government ====
The president's most important power, in practice, is to lead the process of forming a Government. Israel's electoral system and fractured political landscape make it all but impossible for one party to govern alone, let alone win an outright majority of Knesset seats. After each election, the president consults with party leaders to determine who is most likely to command a majority in the Knesset. Following such consultations, the president assigns a Knesset member the task of forming a Government. If the nominee is successful in forming a Government that can command the confidence of the Knesset, then said Knesset member becomes the prime minister. If a nominee fails to form a Government, then the president assigns the task anew. If a government is not formed within the timeframe stipulated in Basic Law: The Government, then the president dissolves the Knesset and calls for fresh elections.

==== Dissolution of the Knesset ====
The prime minister may request, by virtue of section 29 (a) of Basic Law: The Government, that the president dissolve the Knesset whenever the Government has lost its majority and is incapable of functioning. The president may refuse such a request, effectively dismissing the prime minister from office and triggering the resignation of the Government. The exercise of this authority by the president serves to prevent a prime minister from abusing their power – namely, beating the Knesset into submission through multiple snap elections.

==== Presidential clemency ====
The president has broad power to pardon, reduce, or commute the sentences of both soldiers and civilians, including to refuse requests for such clemency. The president reaches a decision regarding the prerogative of clemency at his or her own discretion, after receiving information from the applicants, requesting the opinion of other parties, and consulting the minister of justice or the minister of defense, as the case may be. Each Israeli president adopts a different approach to how they handle clemency, which influences their decision making.

=== Other activities ===
The president confers the dignity of Righteous Among the Nations on the recommendation of Yad Vashem, presents the Wolf Prize on the recommendation of the Wolf Foundation, and awards the Presidential Medal of Honor, the President's Fund for Outstanding Doctoral Students, and the Presidential Award for Volunteerism in his absolute discretion. The President also participates in the awarding of the Israel Prize, which is held annually on Yom Ha'atzmaut. Moreover, the president serves as the keynote speaker at the opening ceremonies of the half-yearly Knesset conference, as well as at the annual official ceremonies for Yom Hazikaron and Yom HaShoah.

== Presidential backgrounds ==
Most Israeli presidents were involved in national politics or Zionist activities before taking office. Some were also distinguished in other fields. For example, Chaim Weizmann was a leading research chemist who founded the Weizmann Institute of Science in Rehovot; Zalman Shazar was an author, poet, and journalist; and Chaim Herzog was a military leader, attorney, and diplomat.

The first Israeli presidents were born in the former Russian Empire. The first native-born president, as well as the first with a Sephardi background, was Yitzhak Navon. The first president with a Western European background was Chaim Herzog, who originally came from Belfast, United Kingdom. The first president with a Mizrahi background was Moshe Katsav, who was born in Iran. The first president to be born in the modern state after Israel's declaration of independence is Isaac Herzog. He is also the first son of a former Israeli president to also become president. As of 2024, the only other presidents with close family ties were Chaim Weizmann and his nephew Ezer Weizman.

== Political affiliation ==
All Israeli presidents from Yitzhak Ben-Zvi to Ezer Weizman were members of, or associated with, the Labor Party and its predecessors, and have been considered politically moderate. Moshe Katsav was the first Likud president. These tendencies were especially significant in the April 1978 election of Labor's Yitzhak Navon, following the inability of the governing Likud coalition to elect its candidate to the presidency. Israeli observers believed that, in counterbalance to Prime Minister Menachem Begin's polarizing leadership, Navon, the country's first president of Sephardi origin, provided Israel with unifying symbolic leadership at a time of great political controversy and upheaval. In 1983, Navon decided to re-enter Labor politics after five years of non-partisan service as president, and Chaim Herzog (previously head of military intelligence and Ambassador of Israel to the United Nations) succeeded him as Israel's sixth president. Likud's Moshe Katsav's victory over Labor's Shimon Peres in 2000 (by secret ballot) was an upset.

Albert Einstein, a Jew, but not an Israeli citizen, was offered the presidency in 1952, but turned it down, stating: "I am deeply moved by the offer from our State of Israel, and at once saddened and ashamed that I cannot accept it. All my life I have dealt with objective matters, hence I lack both the natural aptitude and the experience to deal properly with people and to exercise official functions." Ehud Olmert was reported to be considering offering the presidency to another non-Israeli, Elie Wiesel, but he was said to be "very not interested".
