= 1998 Israeli presidential election =

- 4 March 1998

120 members of the Knesset Simple majority of votes needed to win
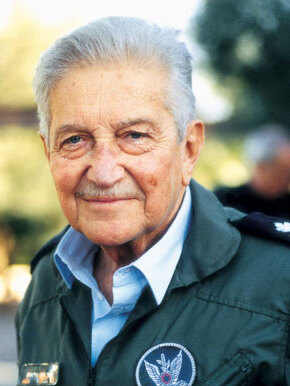

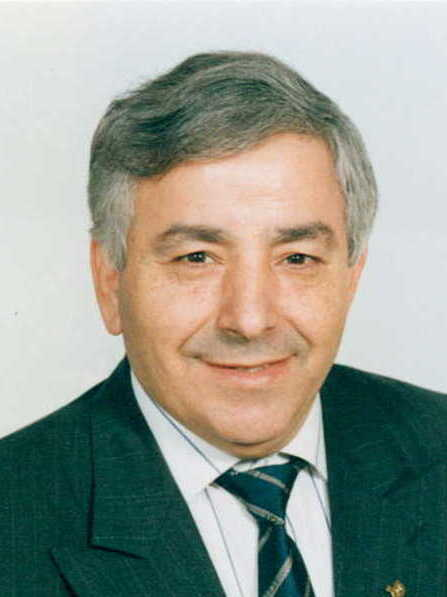
Nominee	Ezer Weizman	Shaul Amor
Party	Labor	Likud
Electoral vote	63	49
President before election
Ezer Weizman
Labor
Elected President
Ezer Weizman
Labor

An election for President of Israel was held in the Knesset on 4 March 1998.

It was the first time an incumbent President of Israel was challenged. Shaul Amor stood against Ezer Weizman, but Weizman was re-elected by a vote of 63 to 49.

== Results ==
Candidate	Party	Votes	%
Ezer Weizman	Israeli Labor Party	63	56.25
Shaul Amor	Likud	49	43.75
Total		112	100.00
Valid votes		112	94.12
Invalid votes		0	0.00
Blank votes		7	5.88
Total votes		119	100.00
Registered voters/turnout		120	99.17
