= Yitzhak Navon =

President of Israel from 1978 to 1983

- יִצְחָק נָבוֹן
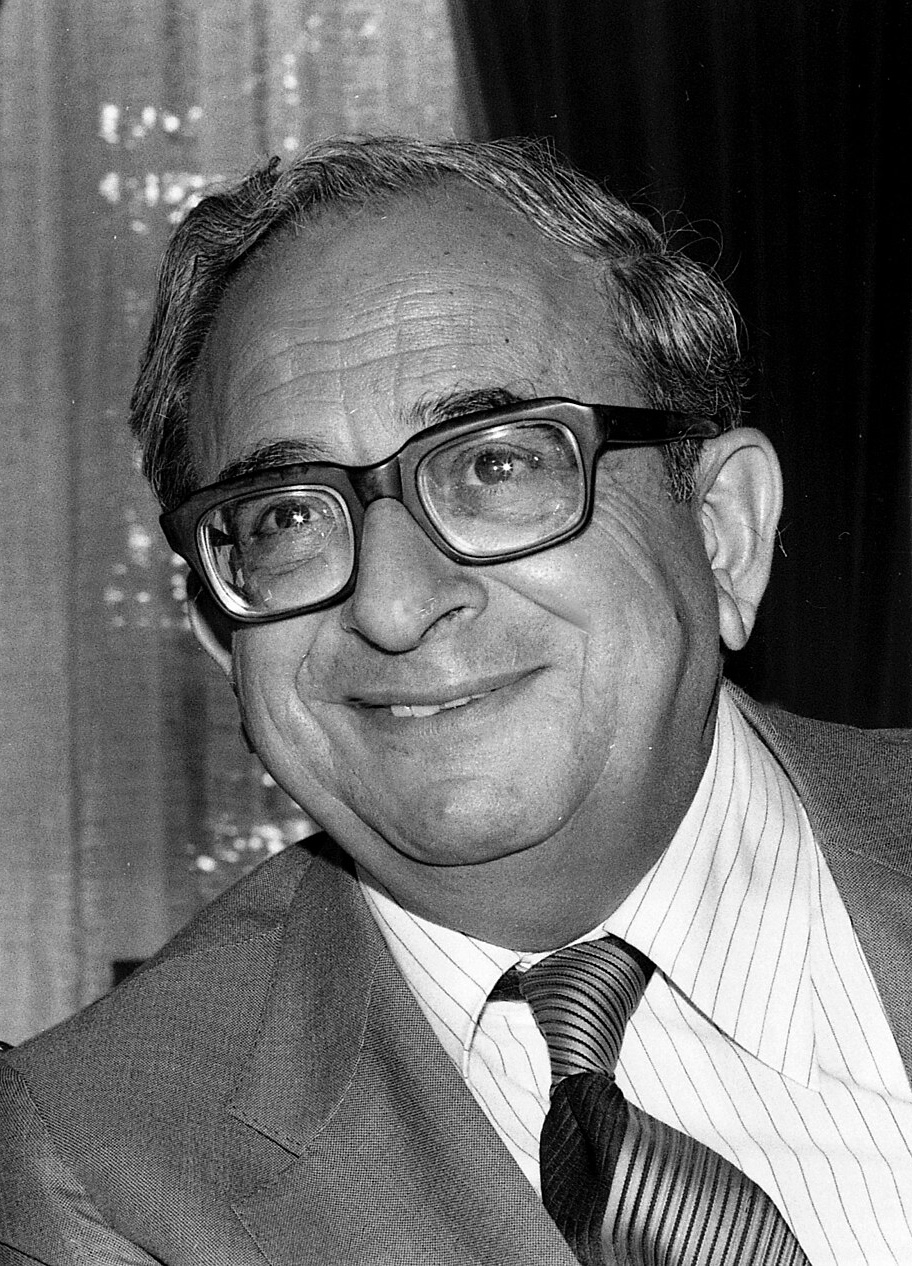
- Navon in 1978

5th President of Israel
- In office 29 May 1978 – 5 May 1983
- Prime Minister: Menachem Begin
- Preceded by: Ephraim Katzir
- Succeeded by: Chaim Herzog

Minister of Education and Culture
- In office 13 September 1984 – 15 March 1990
- Prime Minister: Shimon Peres; Yitzhak Shamir
- Preceded by: Zevulun Hammer
- Succeeded by: Zevulun Hammer

Member of the Knesset
- In office 13 August 1984 – 13 July 1992
- In office 22 November 1965 – 18 April 1978

Personal details
- Born: 9 April 1921 Jerusalem, Mandatory Palestine
- Died: 6 November 2015 (aged 94) Jerusalem, Israel
- Party: Alignment
- Spouse(s): Ofira Resnikov (m. 1963; died 1993) Miri Shafir (m. 2008)
- Children: 2
- Profession: Author

Yitzhak Rachamim Navon (Hebrew: יִצְחָק נָבוֹן; 9 April 1921 – 6 November 2015) was an Israeli politician, diplomat, playwright, and author. He served as the president of Israel between 1978 and 1983 as a member of the centre-left Alignment party. He was the first Israeli president born in Jerusalem and the first Sephardi Jew to serve in that office.

== Biography ==
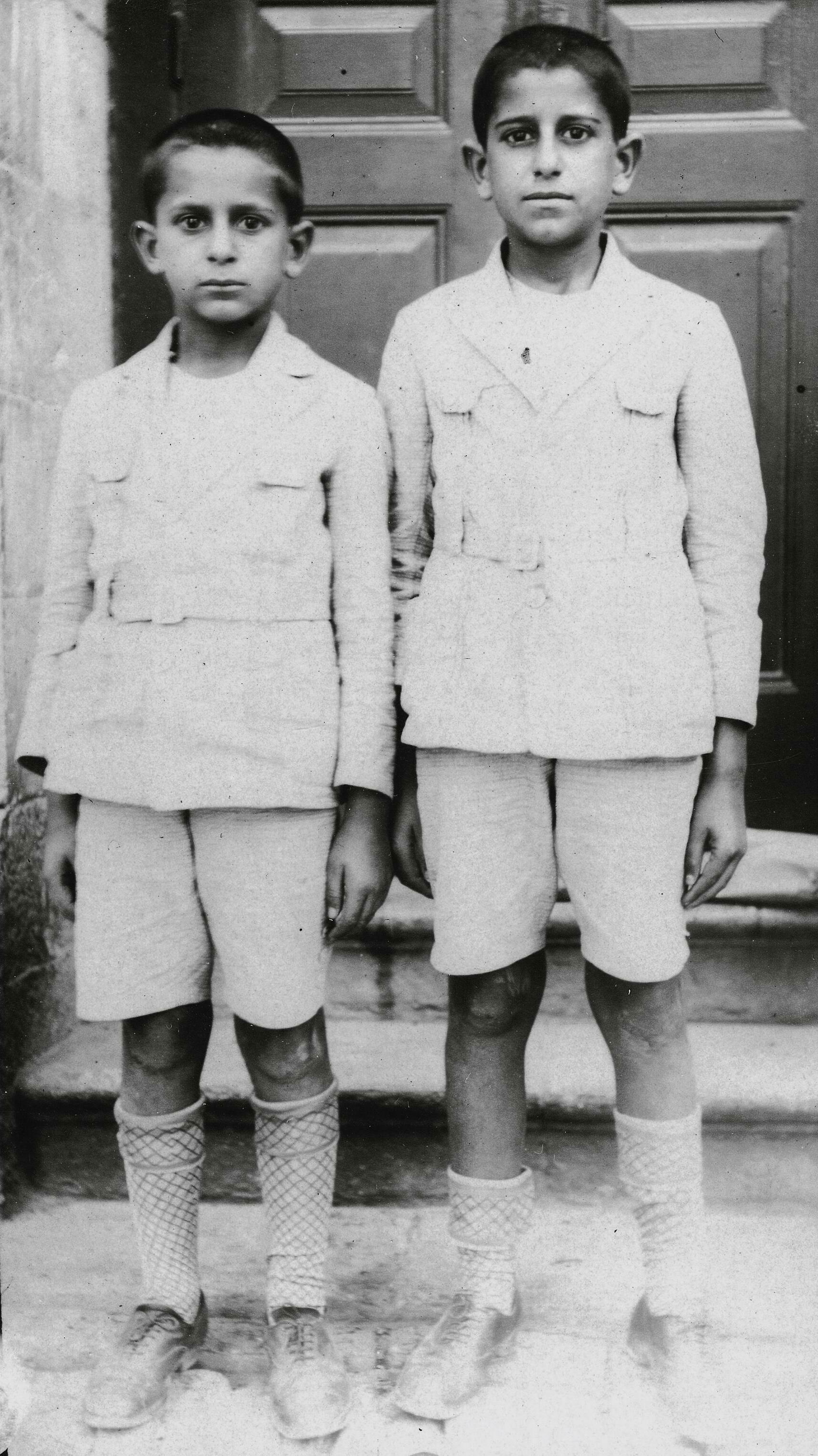
Yitzhak Navon (left) and his brother Victor in Jerusalem, 1929

Navon was born in Jerusalem in what was then the British Mandate for Palestine to Yosef and Miryam Navon, a descendant of a Sephardi Jewish family of rabbis, and had ancestry in Jerusalem going back centuries. On his father's side, he was descended from Sephardi Jews who settled in Turkey after the expulsion of the Jews from Spain in 1492. His ancestors, the Baruch Mizrahi family, immigrated from Turkey to Jerusalem in 1670. On his mother's side, he was descended from the renowned Moroccan-Jewish kabbalist rabbi Chaim ibn Attar, who immigrated to Israel and settled in Jerusalem in 1742.

In 1924, the Navon family moved from Jaffa Road to the Ohel Moshe neighbourhood in Nachlaot. In 1932, they moved to Sheikh Badr near the western entrance to Jerusalem, relocating to Mekor Baruch in 1936.

He attended the Doresh Tziyon and Takhemoni elementary schools and the Hebrew University high school.

Navon studied Arabic and Islamic studies at the Hebrew University of Jerusalem. He taught Hebrew literature for several years. He was fluent in Arabic, Hebrew, Ladino, French and English.

Navon was a member of the Haganah's Arab Intelligence Unit and worked undercover in Jerusalem. During the war, he listened to wiretapped conversations of the British Army. Later he was sent by the Israeli foreign service to Uruguay and Argentina to track down Nazis.

Navon was married to Ofira Navon née Resnikov, who died of cancer in 1993. Navon died in Jerusalem at the age of 94 on 6 November 2015.

Yitzhak Navon with his family, 1934

== Political career ==
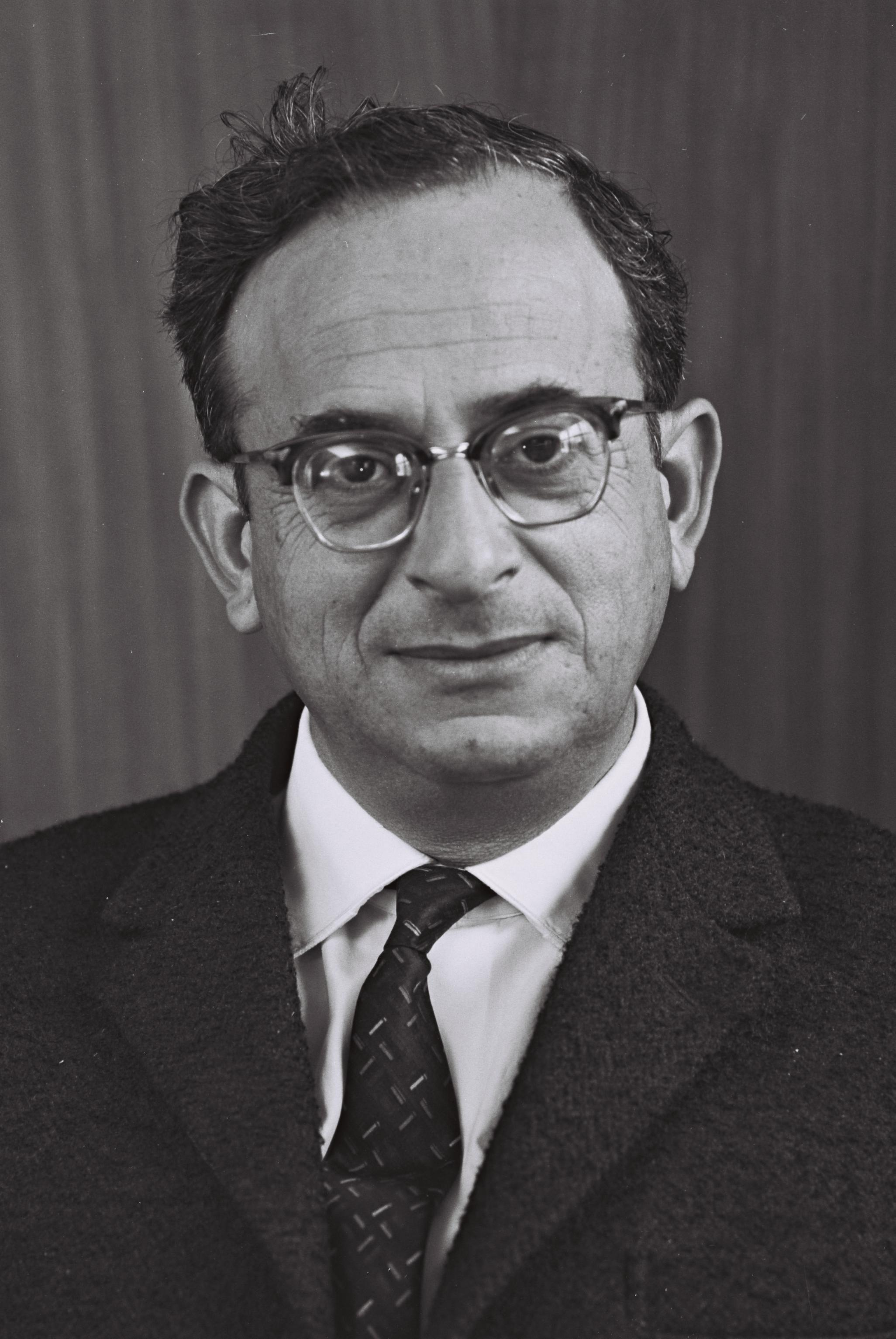
Navon as a Knesset member, 1965

In 1951, Navon became the political secretary of Israel's first prime minister, David Ben-Gurion. The following year he was appointed Ben-Gurion's bureau chief. He remained in this position under Prime Minister Moshe Sharett. His judgment was crucial to the advice the government received during the Suez Crisis and Lavon Affair.

In 1963 Ben-Gurion resigned as prime minister and Navon became a civil service department head at the Ministry of Education and Culture. Navon began a long campaign fighting illiteracy in Israel, which affected about 12% of the Jewish population.

It's a shame and disgrace that more than 200,000 adults in Israel do not know how to read or write in any language, and we must do everything possible to erase this stain from us.

Navon ordered the mobilisation of hundreds of female soldiers serving compulsory national service to teach illiterate adults to read and write Hebrew. Two years later, Navon was elected to the Knesset as a member of Ben-Gurion's Rafi. The new party which had dared challenge the Mapai establishment was driven by 'modernization and scientification'; it merged into the Israeli Labor Party (part of the Alignment) in 1968. But the labour elite of which Navon was one, would in the future dictate the Left's agenda. Navon served as deputy speaker of the Knesset and chairman of the Knesset Committee on Foreign and Defense Affairs.

== President of Israel (1978–83) ==
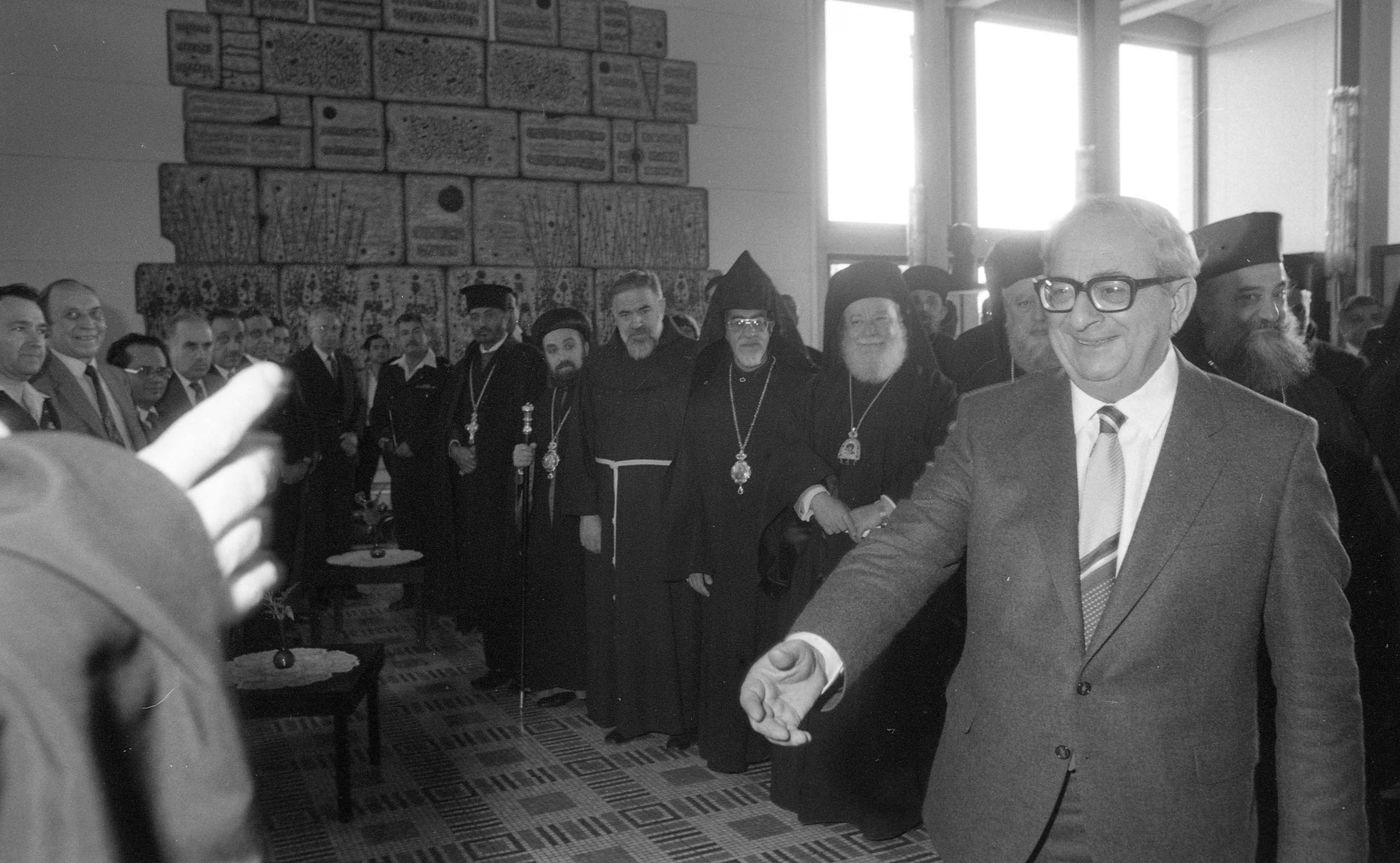
President Navon meeting with Christian leaders before Christmas and the Christian New Year. In the background is an Israeli relief made of basalt ash.

On 19 April 1978, Navon was elected by the Knesset to serve as the fifth President of Israel. The race was uncontested and Navon received 86 votes in the 120-member Knesset with 23 members casting blank votes. He assumed office on 29 May 1978 and was the first president with small children to move into Beit HaNassi, the presidential residence in Jerusalem. His wife, Ofira, was active in promoting the welfare of Israeli children.

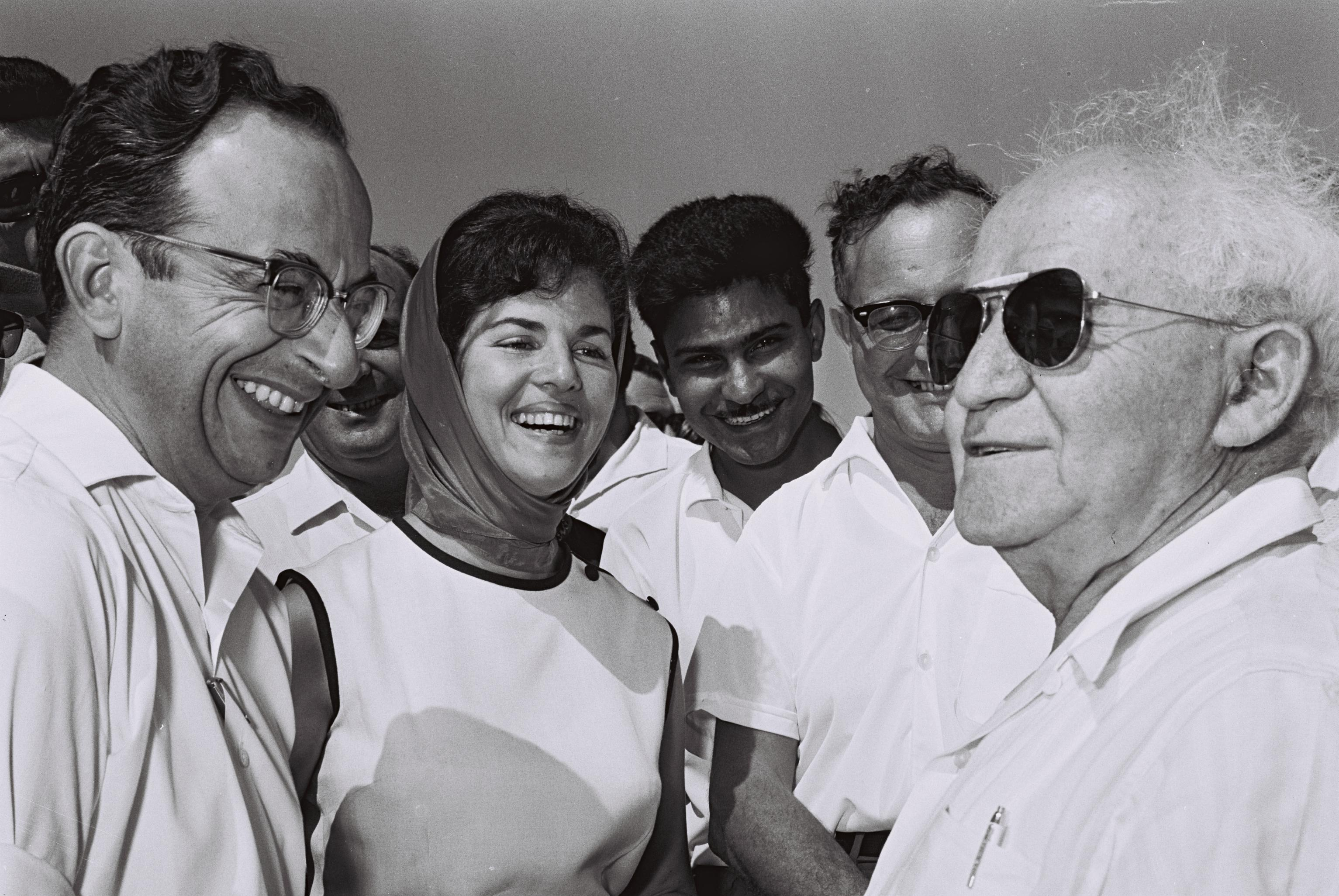
Navon with his wife Ofira and David Ben-Gurion

As a president, Navon met with Egyptian president Anwar Sadat and was influential in the peace talks. According to Haaretz newspaper, he achieved more in one visit than five by Israel's Prime Minister.

Although the Israeli presidency is a ceremonial office, Navon was an outspoken advocate of a judicial commission of inquiry to probe Israel's role in the Sabra and Shatila massacre perpetrated by Lebanese Falangists in 1982.

== Minister of education ==
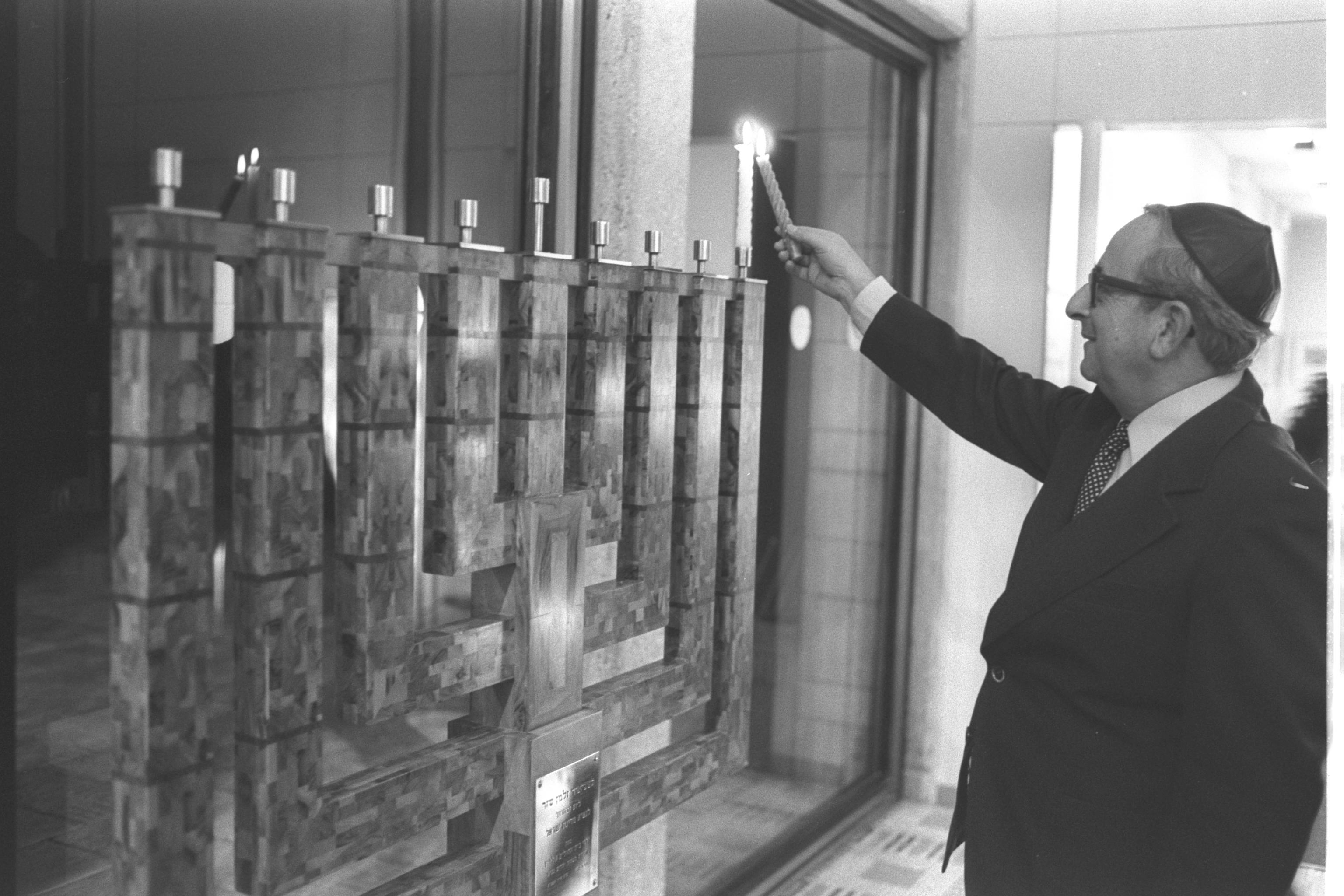
President Yitzhak Navon lighting Hanukkah menorah

In 1983, Navon turned down the opportunity to run for a second term of office. Instead he returned to politics, the only Israeli ex-president to do so. When the polls showed that Navon was more popular than Labor chairman Shimon Peres, Peres was pressured to step aside and allow Navon to take over the party leadership. Navon's fluency in the Arabic language made him especially popular among Arab and Mizrahi voters, but he did not accept the chairmanship. In 1984, he was elected to the Knesset and served as minister of education and culture from 1984 to 1990. Navon was Minister of Education during the first Intifada. Amid riots and protests, Palestinian parents petitioned Navon to reopen their schools. He took a stance in favor of reopening, arguing that the action to be "immoral and ineffective", causing "irreversible damage in the long and short run to Palestinian children and to our own."

Remaining in the Knesset until 1992, he briefly left politics. Navon emerged from retirement to chair a Commission of Inquiry on Israeli medical authorities' controversial practice of discarding blood donated by Israelis of Ethiopian origin due to concerns about AIDS transmission.

== Literary career ==
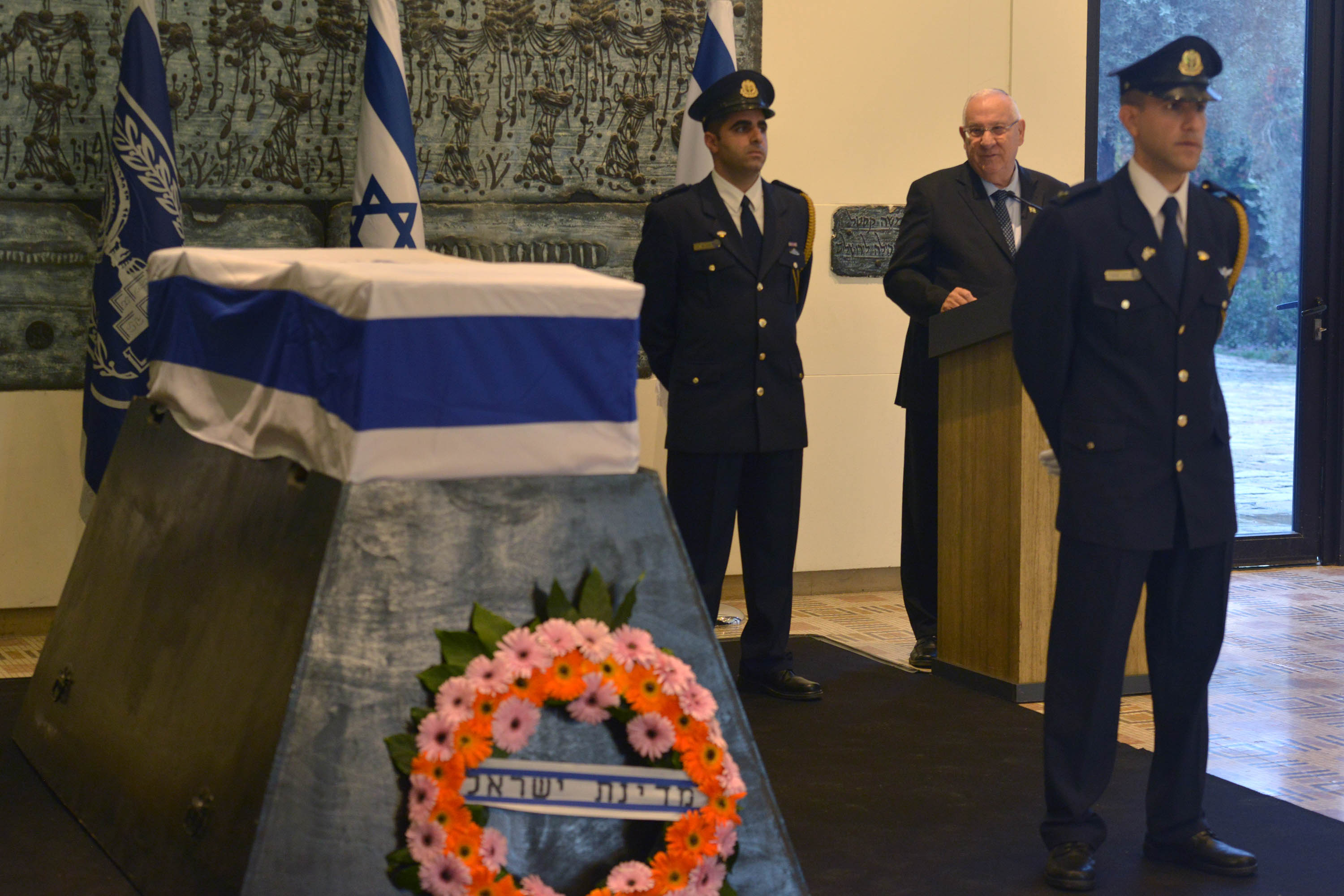
The funeral of Yitzhak Navon

Navon wrote two musicals based on Sephardic folklore: Romancero Sefardi (1968) and Bustan Sefardi ("Sephardic Garden" 1970), which were successfully performed at Habimah, Israel's national theater in Tel Aviv. He is also the author of The Six Days and the Seven Gates (1979), a modern legend of the reunification of Jerusalem, first published in Hebrew by Shikmona Publishing Company and later translated into English.

== Awards and recognition ==
In 2003, the Spanish government granted Navon an award at Herzliya.

In 2007 Navon was honored as one of the torchbearers in the national Israeli Independence Day ceremony.

The Jerusalem - Yitzchak Navon Station in central Jerusalem, Israel, is named after Navon and honors his history in the country. Shortly before his death, he was placed in the honorary last 120th spot on the Zionist Union list on 2015 Israeli legislative election.

== Bibliography ==
- Bar-Zohar, Michael (1978). Ben-Gurion. London: Weidenfeld & Nicolson.
- Elon, Amos (1971). The Israelis, Founders and Sons. London: Weidenfeld & Nicolson.
- Shimoni, Yaacov (1991). Biographical Dictionary of the Middle East. New York, Oxford, Sydney: Facts of the File, the Jerusalem Publishing House.
- Zemach, Shlomo (1945). An Introduction to the History of Labour Settlement in Palestine, Zionist Library. Tel Aviv.
- Zweig, Ronald W. (1991). David Ben-Gurion, Politics and Leadership in Israel. London, and Yad Izhak Ben-Zvi, Jerusalem: Frank Cass.

Political offices
Preceded by Ephraim Katzir	President of Israel; 1978–1983	Succeeded by Chaim Herzog
Preceded by Zevulun Hammer	Minister of Education; 1984–1990	Succeeded by Zevulun Hammer
