= Ephraim Katzir =

President of Israel from 1973 to 1978

- אֶפְרַיִם קָצִיר
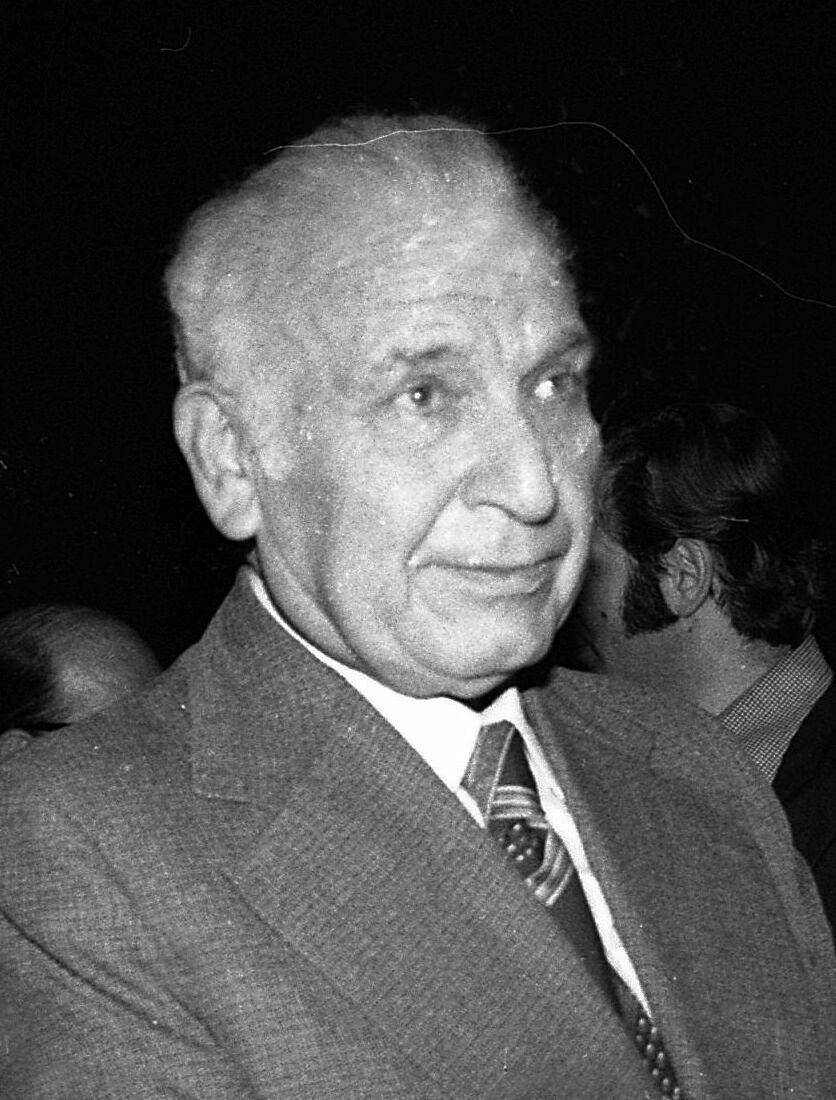
- Katzir in 1978

4th President of Israel
- In office 24 May 1973 – 29 May 1978
- Prime Minister: Golda Meir; Yitzhak Rabin; Menachem Begin
- Preceded by: Zalman Shazar
- Succeeded by: Yitzhak Navon

Personal details
- Born: Efraim Katchalski; 16 May [O.S. 3 May] 1916 Kiev, Kiev uyezd, Kiev Governorate, Russian Empire (Present-day: Kiev, Ukraine)
- Died: 30 May 2009 (aged 93) Rehovot, Israel
- Party: Israeli Labor Party
- Spouse: Nina Gottlieb
- Children: 3
- Profession: Scientist
- Awards: Israel Prize (1959); Japan Prize (1985)

Ephraim Katzir (Hebrew: אֶפְרַיִם קָצִיר, romanized: Ep̄rayim Qaṣir; 16 May [O.S. 3 May] 1916 – 30 May 2009) was an Israeli biophysicist and Labor Party politician. He was the president of Israel from 1973 until 1978.

== Biography ==
Efraim Katchalski (later Katzir) was the son of Yudel-Gersh (Yehuda) and Tzilya Katchalski, in Kiev, in the Russian Empire (today in Ukraine). In 1925 (several publications cite 1922), he immigrated to Mandatory Palestine with his family and settled in Jerusalem. In 1932, he graduated from Gymnasia Rehavia. A fellow classmate, Shulamit Laskov, remembers him as the "shining star" of the grade level. He was “an especially tall young man, a little pudgy, whose goodness of heart was splashed across his smiling face.” He excelled in all areas, “even in drawing and in gymnastics, where he was no slouch. He was the first in the class in arithmetic, and later on in mathematics. No one came close to him.”

Like his elder brother, Aharon, Katzir was interested in science. He studied botany, zoology, chemistry and bacteriology at the Hebrew University of Jerusalem. In 1938 he received an MSc, and in 1941 he received a PhD degree. In 1939, he graduated from the first Haganah officers' course, and became commander of the student unit in the field forces (Hish).

He and his brother worked on the development of new methods of warfare. In late 1947, after the outbreak of the 1948 Palestine war, and in anticipation of the War for Israel’s Independence, Katzir met the biochemist David Rittenberg, then working at Columbia University, stating: ‘I need germs and poisons for the [impending/ongoing Israeli] war of independence,’ Rittenberg referred the matter to Chaim Weizmann. Weizmann initially dismissed the request, branding Katzir a ‘savage’ and requested his dismissal from the Sieff Scientific Institute in Rehovot, but weeks later he relented, and his dismissal was rescinded. Shortly afterwards, in March 1948, his brother Aharon, who decades later was one of the victims of the Lod Airport Massacre, was appointed director of a research unit, HEMED, in Mandatory Palestine involving biological warfare. A decision to use such material against Arabs was then taken in early April. In May Ben-Gurion appointed Ephraim to replace his brother as director of the HEMED research unit, given his success abroad in procuring biological warfare materials and equipment to produce them.

Katzir was married to Nina (née Gottlieb), born in Mogilev, present-day Belarus in 1914, who died in 1986. As an English teacher, Nina developed a unique method for teaching language. As the president's wife, she introduced the custom of inviting the authors of children's books and their young readers to the President's Residence. She established the Nurit Katzir Jerusalem Theater Center in 1978 in memory of their deceased daughter, Nurit, who died from accidental carbon monoxide exposure. Another daughter, Irit, killed herself. They had a son, Meir, and three grandchildren. Katzir died on 30 May 2009 at his home in Rehovot.

== Scientific career ==
After continuing his studies at the Polytechnic Institute of Brooklyn, Columbia University and Harvard University, he returned to Israel and became head of the Department of Biophysics at the Weizmann Institute of Science in Rehovot, an institution he helped to found. In 1966–1968, Katzir was Chief Scientist of the Israel Defense Forces. His initial research centered on simple synthetic protein models, but he also developed a method for binding enzymes, which helped lay the groundwork for what is now called enzyme engineering.

== Presidency ==
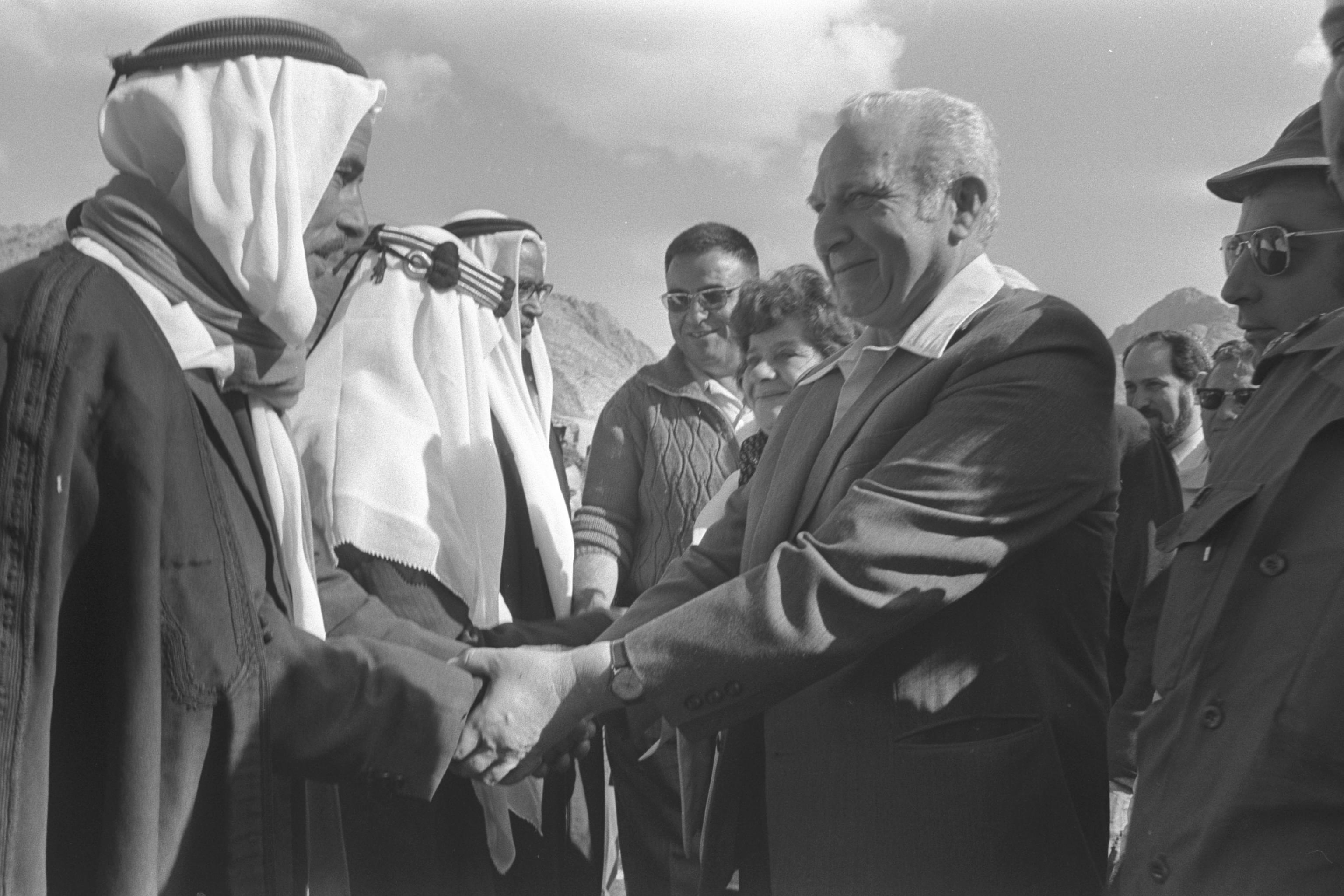
President Katzir meeting with Bedouin sheikhs

In 1973, Golda Meir contacted Katzir at Harvard University, asking him to accept the presidency. He hebraicized his family name to Katzir, which means 'harvest'.

On 10 March 1973, Katzir was elected by the Knesset to serve as the fourth President of Israel. He received 66 votes to 41 cast in favour of his opponent Ephraim Urbach and he assumed office on 24 May 1973. During his appointment, UN approved resolution 3379 which condemned "Zionism as Racism". He was involved in the dispute between Mexico (where the resolution was initially promoted during the World Conference on Women, 1975) and the US Jewish community because of a touristic boycott against Mexico directed from the latter.

In November 1977, he hosted President Anwar Sadat of Egypt in the first ever official visit to Israeli-controlled territory by an Arab head of state. As of today, it remains the only such visit.

In 1978, he declined to stand for a second term due to his wife's illness, and was succeeded by Yitzhak Navon. After stepping down as President, he returned to his scientific work.

== Awards and recognition ==
- In 1959, Katzir was awarded the Israel Prize in life sciences.
- In 1966, he was elected to the American Philosophical Society
- In 1966, he was elected to the United States National Academy of Sciences
- In 1972, he was awarded the Sir Hans Krebs Medal of the Federation of European Biochemical Societies
- In 1976, he was elected to the American Philosophical Society
- In 1977, he was elected a Foreign Member of the Royal Society (ForMemRS)
- In 1985, he was awarded the Japan Prize.
- In 2000, the Rashi Foundation established the Katzir Scholarship Program in honor of Katzir, one of the first members of its board of directors.
- He is also a recipient of the Tchernichovsky Prize for exemplary translation.

He also received honorary degrees from various scientific societies and universities worldwide. The Department of Biotechnology Engineering at the ORT Braude Academic College of Engineering in Karmiel was named after him during his lifetime.

== See also ==
- List of Israel Prize recipients
