= 2003 Israeli Labor Party interim leadership election =

Israeli Labor Party leadership election

- 19 June 2003

vote by Central Committee of party
- Turnout: 52%
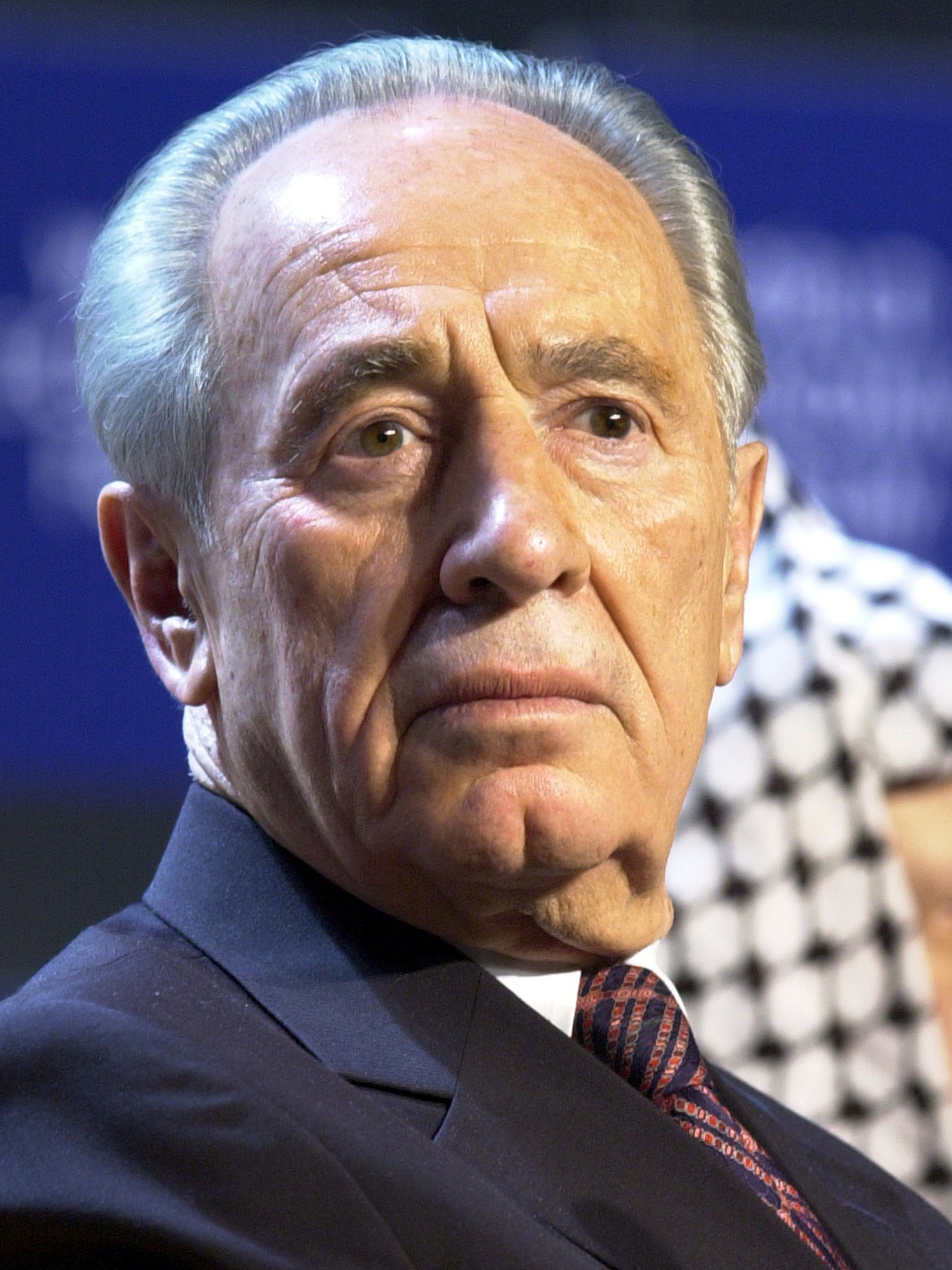

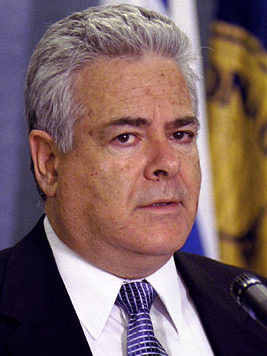

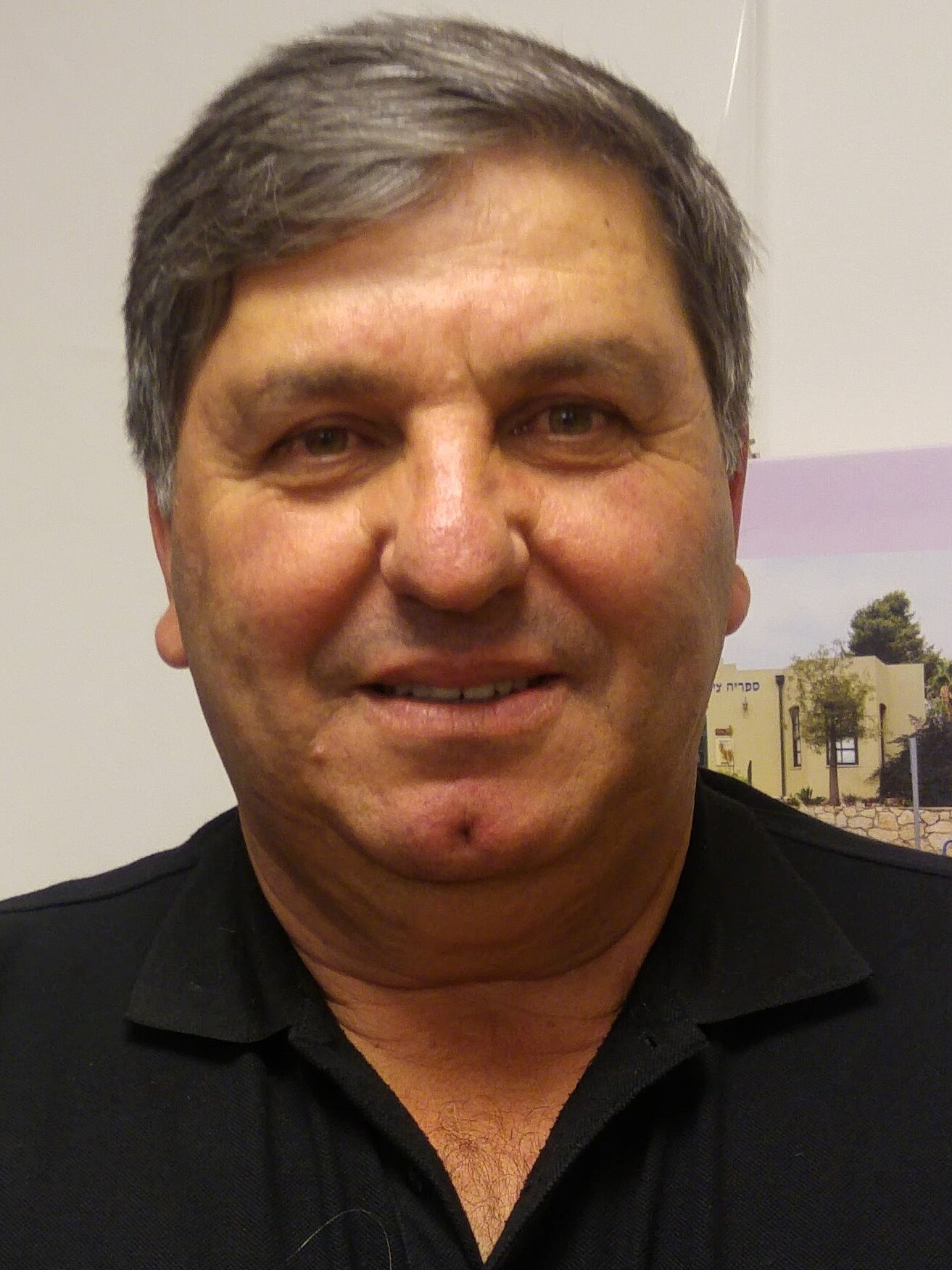
Candidate	Shimon Peres	Efraim Sneh	Danny Atar
Party	Labor	Labor	Labor
Popular vote	631	359	281
Percentage	49.65%	28.25%	22.11%
Leader before election
Vacant
(most recently Amram Mitzna)
Elected Leader
Shimon Peres (interim)

The 2003 Israeli Labor Party leadership election was held on 19 June 2003 to elect the leader of the Israeli Labor Party. It saw the party's Central Committee elect former prime minister and former longtime party leader Shimon Peres as the party's interim leader.

== Background ==
The leadership vote took place following Labor's heavy defeat in the 2003 Israeli legislative election held in January. Quickly after this defeat, Amram Mitzna announced his resignation as party leader.

Unlike the party's regular leadership elections since 1992 (which have been open to its general membership, with the exception of the 1995 leadership election held under extraordinary circumstances), the electorate of this election consisted only of members of the party's Central Committee.

== Candidates ==
- Danny Atar, leader of the Gilboa Regional Council since 1994
- Shimon Peres, former party leader (1977–1992; 1995–1997), former prime minister (1984–1986; 1995–1996), former unofficial acting prime minister (1977), member of the Knesset since 1959, former minister of defense (1974–1977; 1995–1996), former minister of foreign affairs (1986–1988; 1992–1995; 2001–2002)
- Efraim Sneh, member of the Knesset since 1992, former minister of transportation (2001–2002), former minister of health (1994–1996)

== Results ==
Peres won a strong victory over his two younger rivals. However, his margin of the vote was less than many had anticipated he would receive. This was the fifth and final Israeli Labor Party leadership vote that Peres would win, after the 1977, April 1977, 1980, and 1984 leadership elections. It was also the eight Israeli Labor Party leadership election that Peres had run in, as, in addition to the aforementioned leadership elections that he won, he had unsuccessfully run in the 1974, February 1977, and 1992 leadership elections. Peres would go on to unsuccessfully run in one final leadership election when he ran unsuccessfully in the following 2005 leadership election.

2003 Israeli Labor Party interim leadership election
Candidate	Votes	%
Shimon Peres	631	49.65
Efraim Sneh	359	28.25
Danny Atar	281	22.11
Total votes	1,271	100
Abstentions	11	n/a
Turnout	{{{votes}}}	52%
