= Shimon Peres =

Former prime minister and president of Israel

- שמעון פרס
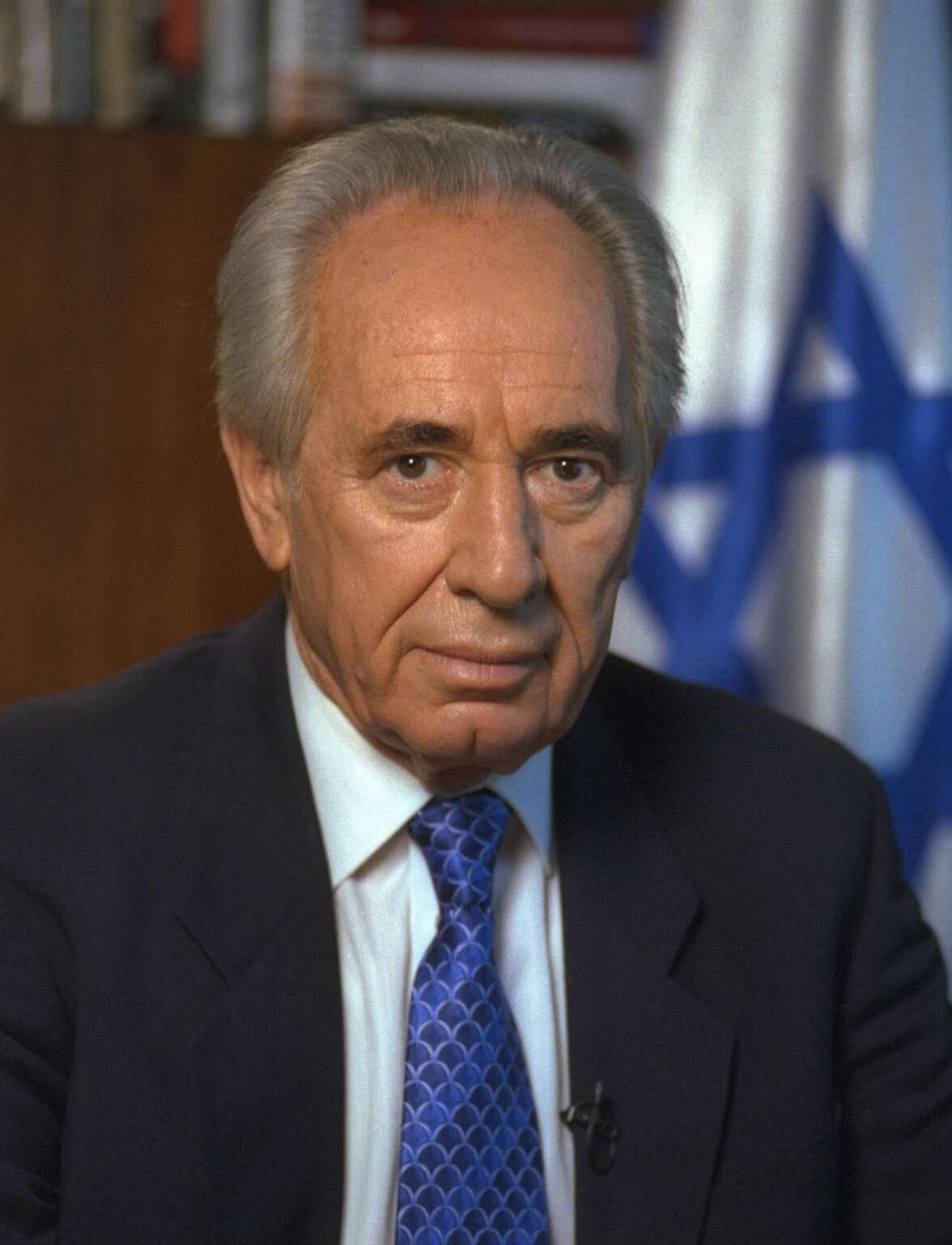
- Official portrait, 1996

9th President of Israel
- In office 15 July 2007 – 24 July 2014
- Prime Minister: Ehud Olmert; Benjamin Netanyahu
- Preceded by: Moshe Katsav
- Succeeded by: Reuven Rivlin

Prime Minister of Israel
- In office 4 November 1995 – 18 June 1996 (Note: Interim: 4–22 November 1995)
- President: Ezer Weizman
- Preceded by: Yitzhak Rabin
- Succeeded by: Benjamin Netanyahu
- In office 13 September 1984 – 20 October 1986
- President: Chaim Herzog
- Preceded by: Yitzhak Shamir
- Succeeded by: Yitzhak Shamir
- Acting; 22 April 1977 – 21 June 1977 (Note: Due to laws preventing the resignation of a caretaker prime minister, Rabin was still legally prime minister during Peres' 1977 acting premiership. Peres, however, was heading the caretaker government as the de facto prime minister.)
- President: Ephraim Katzir
- Preceded by: Yitzhak Rabin
- Succeeded by: Menachem Begin

Leader of the Opposition
- In office 25 June 2003 – 10 January 2005
- Prime Minister: Ariel Sharon
- Preceded by: Dalia Itzik
- Succeeded by: Tommy Lapid
- De facto 18 June 1996 – 1 July 1997
- Prime Minister: Benjamin Netanyahu
- Preceded by: Benjamin Netanyahu
- Succeeded by: Ehud Barak
- De facto 15 March 1990 – 20 February 1992
- Prime Minister: Yitzhak Shamir
- Preceded by: Shulamit Aloni
- Succeeded by: Yitzhak Rabin
- De facto 21 June 1977 – 13 September 1984
- Prime Minister: Menachem Begin; Yitzhak Shamir
- Preceded by: Menachem Begin
- Succeeded by: Yuval Ne'eman

Member of the Knesset
- In office 17 April 2006 – 13 June 2007
- In office 30 November 1959 – 15 January 2006

Ministerial portfolios
- 1969–1970: Immigrant Absorption
- 1970–1974: Communications; Transportation
- 1974–1977: Defense; Information
- 1984: Internal Affairs; Religious Affairs
- 1986–1988: Minister of Foreign Affairs
- 1988–1990: Finance
- 1992–1995: Foreign Affairs

Personal details
- Born: Szymon Perski; 2 August 1923 Wiszniew, Nowogródek Voivodeship, Poland
- Died: 28 September 2016 (aged 93) Ramat Gan, Israel
- Resting place: Mount Herzl, Jerusalem
- Party: Mapai (1959–1965); Rafi (1965–1968); Labor (1968–2005); Kadima (beginning in 2005)
- Other political affiliations: Alignment (1965–1991)
- Spouse: Sonya Gelman (m. 1945; died 2011)
- Children: 3, including Tsvia and Chemi
- Relatives: Lauren Bacall (cousin); Uzi Peres (nephew)
- Education: The New School; New York University; Harvard University
- Awards: Nobel Peace Prize (1994)

Military service
- Allegiance: Israel
- Branch/service: Haganah; Israel Defense Forces
- Peres Peres on the signing of the Oslo Accords; Recorded 19 September 1993

Shimon Peres (/ʃiːˌmoʊn ˈpɛrɛs, -ɛz/ shee-MOHN PERR-ess, -ez; Hebrew: שמעון פרס [ʃiˌmon ˈpeʁes]; born Szymon Perski, Polish: [ˈʂɨmɔn ˈpɛrskʲi]; 2 August 1923 – 28 September 2016) was an Israeli politician and statesman who served as the prime minister of Israel from 1984 to 1986 and from 1995 to 1996 and as the president of Israel from 2007 to 2014. He was a member of twelve cabinets and represented five political parties in a political career spanning 70 years. Peres was elected to the Knesset in November 1959 and except for three months out of office in early 2006, served as a member of the Knesset continuously until he was elected president in 2007. Serving in the Knesset for 48 years (with the first uninterrupted stretch lasting more than 46 years), Peres is the longest serving member in the Knesset's history. At the time of his retirement from politics in 2014, he was the world's oldest head of state and was considered the last link to Israel's founding generation, as well as the last Prime Minister to make aliyah rather than being born on territory that would become Israel.

From a young age, he was renowned for his oratorical brilliance, and was chosen as a protégé by David Ben-Gurion, Israel's founding father. He began his political career in the late 1940s, holding several diplomatic and military positions during and directly after the 1948 Arab–Israeli War. His first high-level government position was as deputy director general of defense in 1952 which he attained at the age of 28, and director general from 1953 until 1959. In 1956, he took part in the historic negotiations on the Protocol of Sèvres, which was described by British prime minister Anthony Eden as the "highest form of statesmanship". In 1963, he held negotiations with U.S. president John F. Kennedy, which resulted in the sale of Hawk anti-aircraft missiles to Israel, the first sale of U.S. military equipment to Israel. Peres represented Mapai, Rafi, the Alignment, Labor and Kadima in the Knesset, and led Alignment and Labor.

Peres first succeeded Yitzhak Rabin as acting prime minister briefly during 1977, before becoming prime minister from 1984 to 1986. As foreign minister under Prime Minister Rabin, Peres engineered the 1994 Israel–Jordan peace treaty, and won the 1994 Nobel Peace Prize together with Rabin and Yasser Arafat for the Oslo Accords peace talks with the Palestinian leadership. In 1996, he founded the Peres Center for Peace, which has the aim of "promot[ing] lasting peace and advancement in the Middle East by fostering tolerance, economic and technological development, cooperation and well-being." Peres died in 2016 at Sheba Medical Center after suffering a stroke.

== Early life ==
Shimon Peres was born Szymon Perski, on 2 August 1923, in Wiszniew, Poland (now Vishnyeva, Belarus), to Yitzhak (1896–1982) and Sara (1903–1969, née Meltzer) Perski. The family spoke Hebrew, Yiddish and Russian at home, and Peres learned Polish at school. He then learned to speak English and French. His father was a wealthy timber merchant, later branching out into other commodities; his mother was a librarian. Peres had a younger brother, Gershon. He was related to the American film star Lauren Bacall (born Betty Joan Perske), and they were described as first cousins, but Peres said, "In 1952 or 1953, I came to New York ... Lauren Bacall called me, said that she wanted to meet, and we did. We sat and talked about where our families came from, and discovered that we were from the same family ... but I'm not exactly sure what our relation is ... It was she who later said that she was my cousin; I didn't say that".

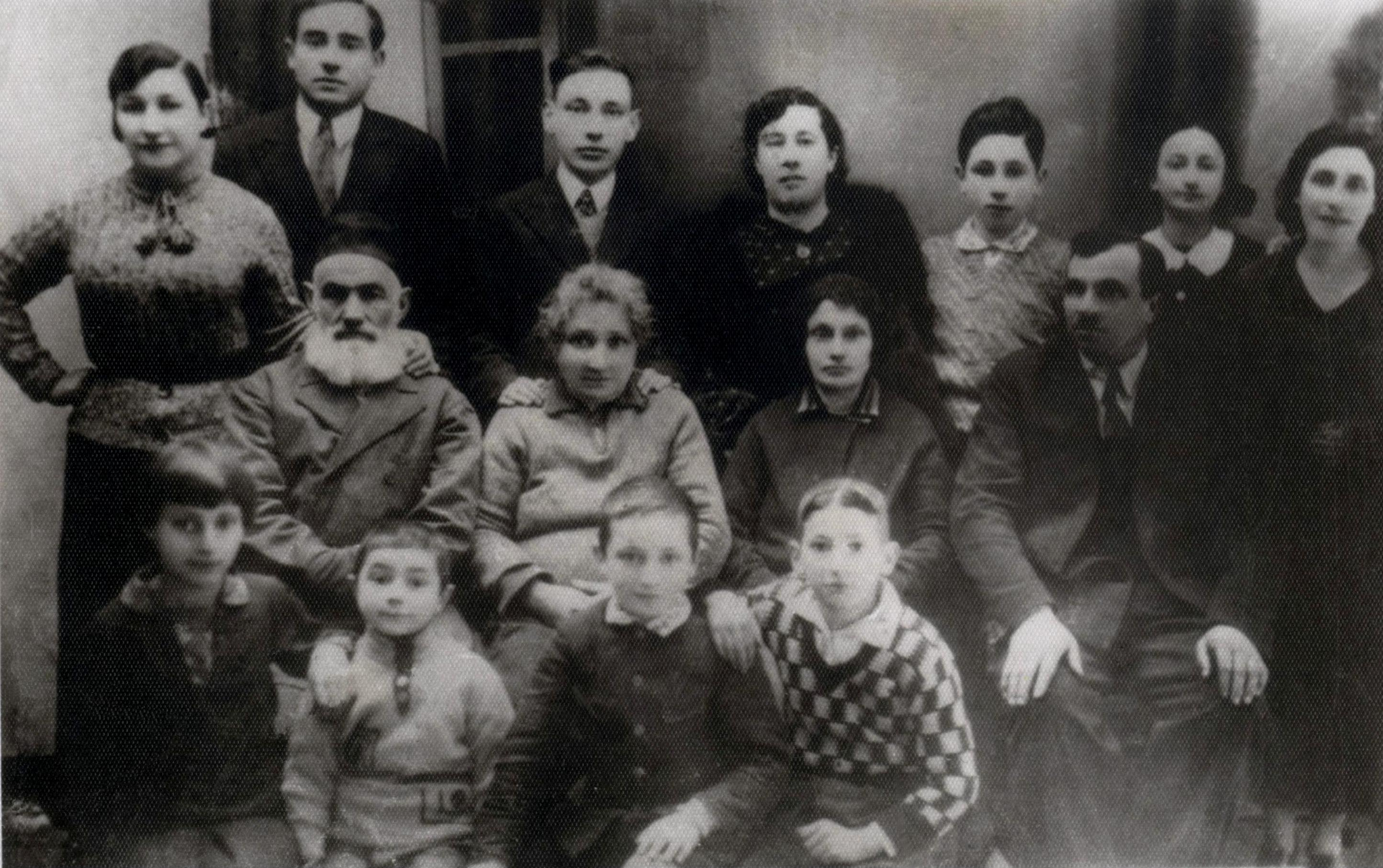
Shimon Peres (standing, third from right) with his family, c. 1930

Peres told Rabbi Menachem Mendel Schneerson that he had been born as a result of a blessing his parents had received from a chassidic rebbe and that he was proud of it. Peres's grandfather, Rabbi Zvi Meltzer, a grandson of Rabbi Chaim Volozhin, had a great impact on his life. In an interview, Peres said: "As a child, I grew up in my grandfather's home. ... I was educated by him. ... My grandfather taught me Talmud. It was not as easy as it sounds. My home was not an observant one. My parents were not Orthodox but I was Haredi. At one point, I heard my parents listening to the radio on the Sabbath and I smashed it." When he was a child, Peres was taken by his father to Radun to receive a blessing from Rabbi Yisrael Meir Kagan (known as "the Chofetz Chaim"). As a child, Peres would later say, "I did not dream of becoming president of Israel. My dream as a boy was to be a shepherd or a poet of stars." He inherited his love of French literature from his maternal grandfather.

In 1932, Peres's father immigrated to Mandatory Palestine and settled in Tel Aviv. The family followed him in 1934. He attended Balfour Elementary School and High School, and Geula Gymnasium (High School for Commerce) in Tel Aviv. At 15, he transferred to Ben Shemen agricultural school and lived on Kibbutz Geva for several years.

During World War II, Peres' father enlisted in the British Army as a sapper in the Royal Engineers and was captured in Greece, returning to Palestine after spending most of the war as a POW. During his captivity, he hid his Jewish identity and was an inmate at Camp E715, a subcamp for POWs that was part of the Auschwitz concentration camp complex. While imprisoned there he met Charles Coward and may have helped him save Jewish Auschwitz inmates. After a failed escape attempt he was saved from execution by an Australian military chaplain. Peres' mother worked in a military parts factory and his future wife also served in the British Army as a nurse and truck driver. Peres by contrast showed more interest in local pioneering than the war effort, stating at the time that "the army and the war don't interest me." In 1941, he was elected Secretary of HaNoar HaOved VeHaLomed, a Labor Zionist youth movement. He was one of the founding pioneers of kibbutz Alumot, and did agricultural work while writing book reviews and newspaper opinion pieces. He also climbed Masada in 1942.

At age 20, he was elected to the HaNoar HaOved VeHaLomed national secretariat, where he was only one of two Mapai party supporters, out of the 12 members. Three years later, he took over the movement and won a majority. The head of Mapai, David Ben-Gurion, and Berl Katznelson began to take an interest in him, and appointed him to Mapai's secretariat.

In 1944, Peres led an illicit expedition into the Negev, then a closed military zone requiring a permit to enter. The expedition, consisting of a group of teenagers, along with a Palmach scout, a zoologist, and an archaeologist, had been funded by Ben-Gurion and planned by Palmach head Yitzhak Sadeh, as part of a plan for future Jewish settlement of the area so as to include it in the Jewish state. The group was arrested by a Bedouin camel patrol led by a British officer, taken to Beersheba (then a small Arab town) and incarcerated in the local jail. All of the participants were sentenced to two weeks in prison, and as the leader, Peres was also heavily fined. The expedition came across a nest of bearded vultures, called peres in Hebrew, and from this Peres took his Hebrew name.

All of Peres's relatives who remained in Wiszniew in 1941 were murdered during the Holocaust, many of them (including Rabbi Meltzer) burned alive in the town's synagogue.

In 1945, Peres married Sonia Gelman, who preferred to remain outside the public eye. They had three children.

In 1946, Peres and Moshe Dayan were chosen as the two youth delegates in the Mapai delegation to the Zionist Congress in Basel.

In 1947, Peres joined the Haganah, the predecessor of the Israel Defense Forces. David Ben-Gurion made him responsible for personnel and arms purchases; he was appointed to head the naval service when Israel received independence in 1948.

Peres was director of the Defense Ministry's delegation in the United States in the early 1950s. While in the U.S. he studied English, economics, and philosophy at The New School and New York University, and completed a four-month advanced management course at Harvard University.

== Director General of Defense (1953–1959) ==
In 1952, Peres was appointed deputy director general of the Ministry of Defense, and the following year, he was promoted to director general. At age 29, he was the youngest person to hold this position. He was involved in arms purchases and establishing strategic alliances that were important for the State of Israel. He was instrumental in establishing close relations with France, securing massive amounts of quality arms that, in turn, helped to tip the balance of power in the region.

In 1955, he testified against Minister of Defense Pinhas Lavon in what became known as the Lavon Affair.

Owing to Peres's mediation, Israel acquired the advanced Dassault Mirage III French jet fighter, established the Dimona nuclear reactor and entered into a tri-national agreement with France and the United Kingdom, positioning Israel in what would become the 1956 Suez Crisis. Peres continued as a primary intermediary in the close French-Israeli alliance from the mid-1950s, although from 1958, he was often involved in tense negotiations with Charles de Gaulle over the Dimona project.

Peres is considered to have been the architect of Israel's secret nuclear weapons program in the 1960s, and he stated that, in the 1960s, he recruited Arnon Milchan, an Israeli-American Hollywood film producer, billionaire businessman, and secret arms dealer and intelligence operative, to work for the Israeli Bureau of Scientific Relations (LEKEM or LAKAM), a secret intelligence organization tasked with obtaining military technology and science espionage.

=== 1956 Suez Crisis ===
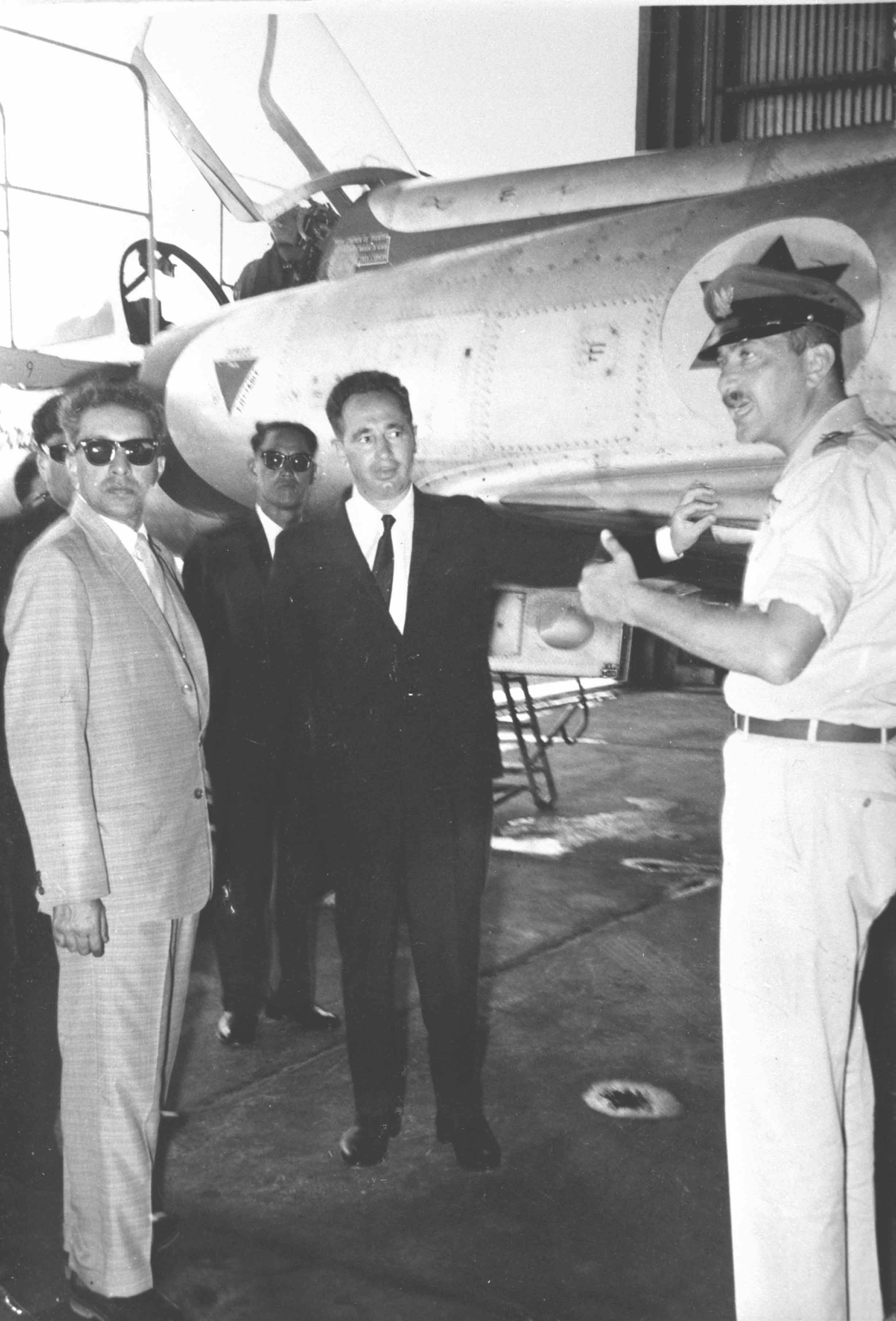
Peres (center) with Ezer Weizman (right) and King Mahendra of Nepal in 1958

From 1954, as director general of the Ministry of Defense, Peres was involved in the planning of the 1956 Suez War, in partnership with France and Britain. Peres was sent by David Ben-Gurion to Paris, where he held secret meetings with the French government. Peres was instrumental in negotiating the Franco-Israeli agreement for a military offensive. In November 1954, Peres visited Paris, where he was received by the French defense minister Marie-Pierre Kœnig, who told him that France would sell Israel any weapons it wanted to buy. By early 1955, France was shipping large amounts of weapons to Israel. In April 1956, following another visit to Paris by Peres, France agreed to disregard the Tripartite Declaration, and supply more weapons to Israel. During the same visit, Peres informed the French that Israel had decided upon war with Egypt in 1956. Throughout the 1950s, an extraordinarily close relationship existed between France and Israel, characterised by unprecedented cooperation in the fields of defense and diplomacy. For his work as the architect of this relationship, Peres was awarded the highest order of the French, the Legion of Honor, as Commander.

At Sèvres, Peres took part in planning alongside Maurice Bourgès-Maunoury, Christian Pineau and Chief of Staff of the French Armed Forces General Maurice Challe, and British Foreign Secretary Selwyn Lloyd and his assistant Sir Patrick Dean. Britain and France enlisted Israeli support for an alliance against Egypt. The parties agreed that Israel would invade the Sinai. Britain and France would then intervene, purportedly to separate the warring Israeli and Egyptian forces, instructing both to withdraw to a distance of 16 kilometres from either side of the canal. The British and French would then argue, according to the plan, that Egypt's control of such an important route was too tenuous, and that it needed be placed under Anglo-French management. The agreement at Sèvres was initially described by British prime minister Anthony Eden as the "highest form of statesmanship". The three allies, especially Israel, were mainly successful in attaining their immediate military objectives. However, the extremely hostile reaction to the Suez Crisis from both the United States and the USSR forced them to withdraw, resulting in a failure of Britain and France's political and strategic aims of controlling the Suez Canal.

== Early Knesset career (1959–1974) ==
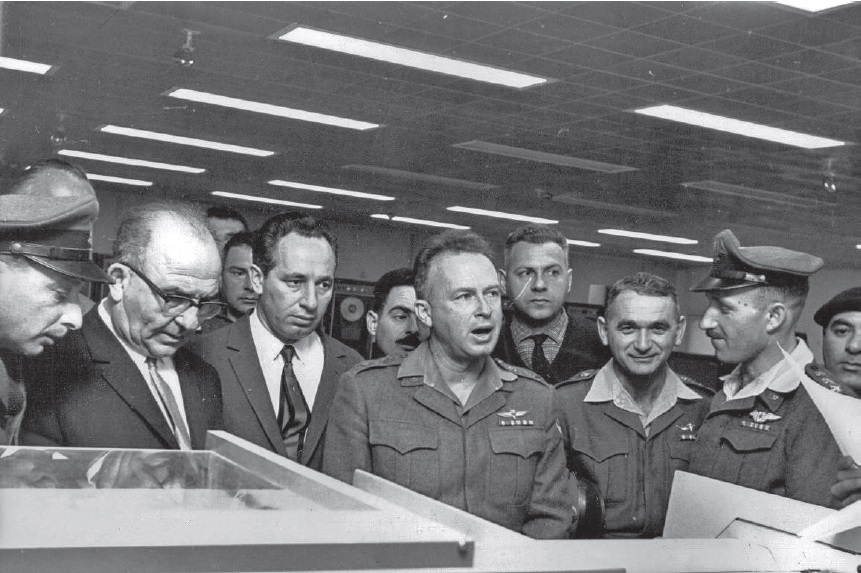
Shimon Peres with Yitzak Rabin and Levi Eshkol in 1964

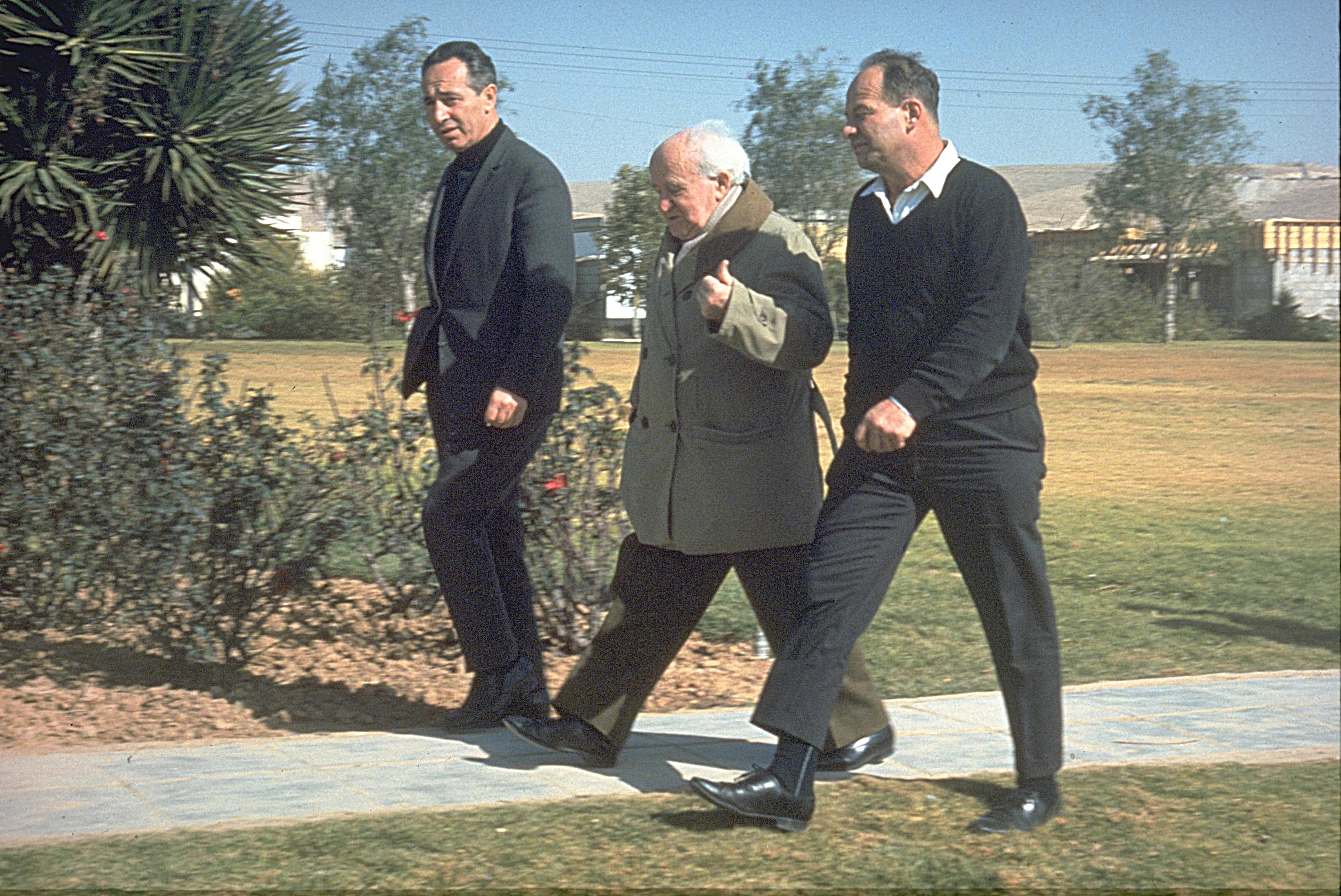
Peres accompanying Ben-Gurion on his daily walk at Kibbutz Sde Boker. March 1969.

Peres was first elected to the Knesset in the 1959 elections as a member of the Mapai party. He was given the role of deputy minister of defense, which he filled until 1965 (holding this position in the 9th, 10th, 11th, and 12th governments of Israel under Prime Ministers David Ben-Gurion and Levi Eshkol). In this position, he held negotiations with John F. Kennedy, which concluded with the sale of Hawk anti-aircraft missiles to Israel, the first sale of US military equipment to Israel. Peres expressed great appreciation and praise for the American decision to sell Hawk missiles in a speech to the Knesset on 25 June 1963.

Peres resigned from the 12th government in late May 1965, citing the growing rift between Prime Minister Eshkol and former prime minister Ben-Gurion (Peres was aligned with Ben-Gurion). In 1965, Peres and Moshe Dayan were among those that left Mapai with David Ben-Gurion when Ben-Gurion formed a new party, Rafi. Peres was a co-founder of the Rafi party. The party reconciled with Mapai in 1968, merging to form the Israeli Labor Party. The Labor Party then joined the Alignment (a left-wing alliance).

In 1969, Peres was appointed minister of immigrant absorption in the 15th government (led by Prime Minister Golda Meir), and in 1970 (also in the 15th government), he became minister of transportation and communications. After this, he served as minister of information in the Meir-led 16th government.

== Minister of Defense (1974–1977) ==
Peres was appointed minister of defense in the Yitzhak Rabin-led 17th government, after having been Rabin's chief rival for the post of Labor Party leader (and, in effect, the Israeli premiership) in the 1974 Israeli Labor Party leadership election that was held after Golda Meir resigned in the aftermath of the Yom Kippur War.

=== 1976 Entebbe rescue operation ===
On 27 June 1976, Peres, as minister of defense, in collaboration with Prime Minister Rabin, handled Israel's response to a coordinated act of terrorism when 248 Paris-bound travelers on an Air France plane were taken hostage by pro-Palestinian hijackers and flown to Uganda, Africa, 2,000 miles away.

Peres and Rabin were responsible for approving what became known as the "Operation Entebbe", which took place on 4 July 1976. The rescue boosted the Rabin government's approval rating with the public. The only Israeli soldier that was killed during the successful rescue operation was its commander, 30-year-old Lieutenant Colonel Jonathan Netanyahu, older brother of Benjamin Netanyahu.

Before Rabin ultimately approved the rescue mission, he and Peres were at odds on how to proceed. Rabin was open to acquiescing to the terrorists' demands to release forty Palestinian militants if no military option presented itself. Peres, however, felt acquiescing to be a nonstarter, believing it would encourage further terrorism. Rabin initially took steps to begin negotiations with the terrorists, seeing no other option. Peres felt that negotiating with terrorists would, in effect, be a surrender, and thought a rescue operation should be planned.

Peres organized a secret Israel Crisis Committee to come up with a rescue plan. When a plan had been made, he met with commander Netanyahu a number of times. During one of their final private meetings, they both examined maps and went over precise details. Peres later said of Netanyahu's explanation, "My impression was one of exactitude and imagination," saying that Netanyahu seemed confident the operation would succeed with almost no losses. Netanyahu left the meeting understanding that Peres would do everything in his power to see that the operation went smoothly. Peres then went unannounced to Moshe Dayan, the former minister of Defense, interrupting his dinner with friends in a restaurant, to show him the latest plan to get his opinion. Peres told Dayan of the objections that had been raised by Rabin and chief of staff, Mordechai Gur. Dayan dismissed the objections after reviewing the written details: "Shimon," he said, "this is a plan that I support not one hundred percent but one hundred and fifty percent! There has to be a military operation." Peres later got the approval from Gur, who became fully supportive. Peres then took the plan to Rabin, who had been lukewarm and still didn't like the risks, but he reluctantly approved the plan after Peres answered a number of key questions and Rabin learned that the cabinet had also endorsed it.

Shortly after the mission ended, Rabin recounted, "we called into my office seven of our top commanders...I told our friends in uniform that the honor of the Jewish people, their destinies, are challenged and what we are considering is not just a calculated risk in the military sense, but a comparative risk, which exists between surrender to terror and daring rescue stemming from independence."

After the success of the operation, Peres angled to receive some of the credit and adulation, somewhat competing with Rabin for credit.

=== Unsuccessful February 1977 campaign for Labor Party leader ===
In February 1977, Peres challenged Prime Minister Rabin for the leadership of Labor Party, but lost to Rabin in a narrow 50.72% to 49.28% result in the vote by the party's Central Committee. The leadership election was expected to determine who would lead the party into the 1977 Knesset election. This was at moment when Labor was threatened with the prospect of losing its control of government after 28-consecutive years due to the rise of both the right-wing Likud bloc and the centrist Democratic Movement for Change, which were seen as collectively cutting into the Labor Party's support in the upcoming election. At the time, Rabin and Peres presented little policy difference, with Peres being seen as only slightly to the right of Rabin on domestic matters. Instead of positioning himself in contrast to the incumbent Rabin on policy, Peres instead capitalized off of the political atmosphere and staked his candidacy largely on an argument that the Labor Party needed to satisfy the nation's desire for change by choosing a new leader for itself.

== Unofficial acting premiership (1977) ==
On 7 April 1977, Prime Minister Rabin announced that, in the wake of a foreign currency scandal involving his wife, he would be stepping down prior to the 1977 Knesset election. Peres made himself a candidate to replace him as the new Labor Party leader. Initially, Foreign Minister Yigal Allon also made himself a candidate. However, Allon and Peres reached an agreement that Peres would appoint Allon to any ministerial position that Allon preferred in exchange from his withdrawal of his candidacy. Following Allon's withdrawal, the Labor Party leadership announced on 10 April 1977 that he had chosen to endorse Peres as the party's new leader. On 11 April 1977, the 815-member Central Committee of the party elected Peres by acclamation as the party's new leader.

Rabin ended his active service as prime minister on 22 April 1977, and Peres became Israel's unofficial acting prime minister. The reason why Peres was not officially the holder of this office was that Rabin could not, under Israeli law, resign from his position as prime minister because the government was, at the time, a caretaker government.

In his first election as party leader, Peres led Labor Party and the Alignment coalition to its first ever electoral defeat, and the result afforded the first-place Likud party (led by Menachem Begin) the ability to form a coalition that excluded the left. When the new Likud-led government was formed on 20 June 1977, Peres' time as the unofficial acting prime minister ended.

== Labor in opposition (1977–1984) ==
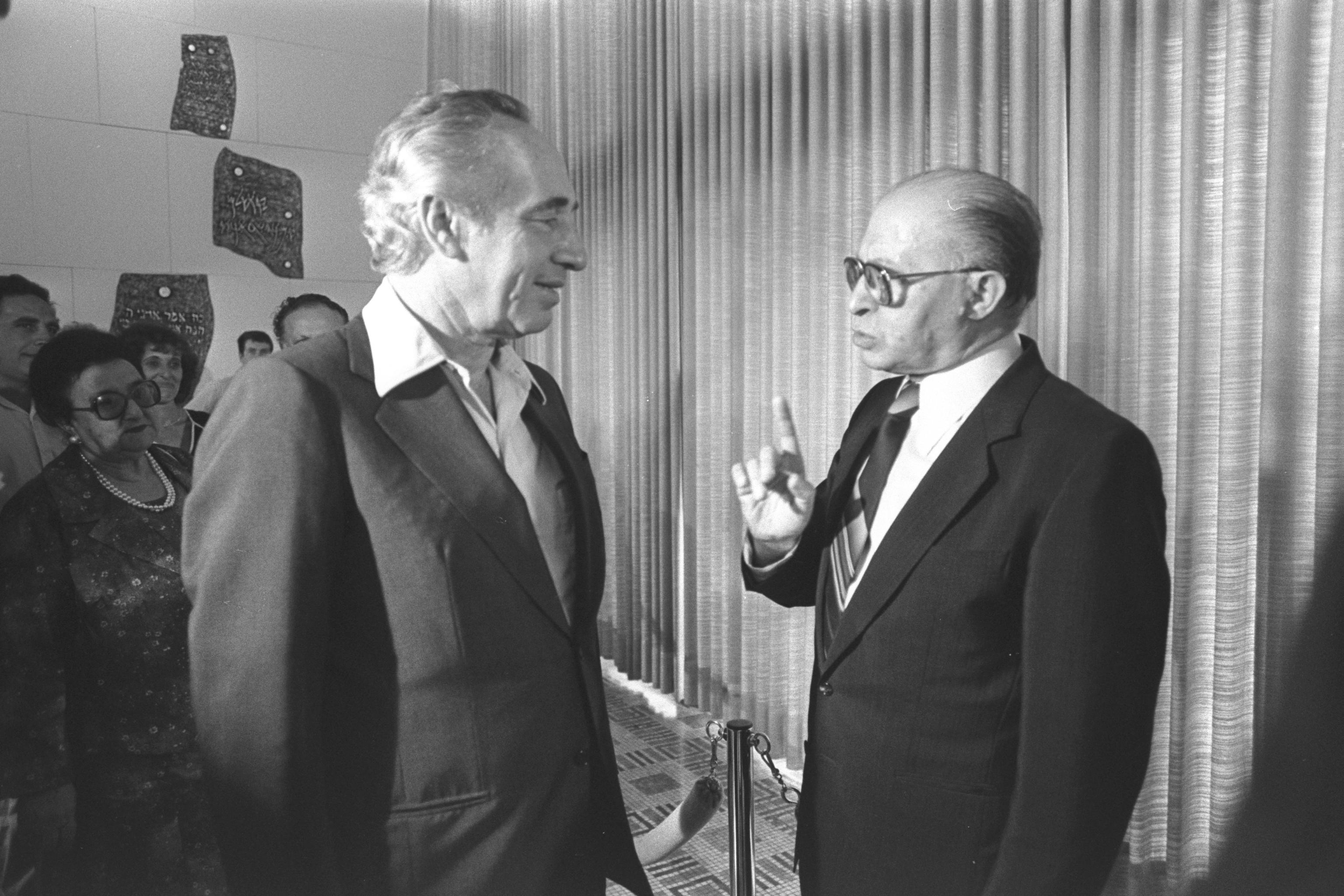
Prime Minister Menachem Begin and Chairman of the Alignment Shimon Peres at the ceremony held by President Yitzhak Navon after the inaugural session of the 10th Knesset, July 1981

Once the Likud-led government took power, Labor and the Alignment bloc entered the Knesset opposition for the first time in its history, and Peres assumed the unofficial role of Knesset opposition leader.

In 1978, Peres was elected vice president of Socialist International. Through his role within the leadership of this organization, Peres befriended foreign politicians including Willy Brandt, Bruno Kreisky, members of the British Labour Party, and politicians from parts of Africa and Asia.

After handily winning reelection as Labor Party leader in 1980 (defeating a challenge from Rabin, who was attempting a comeback to the leadership), Peres led his party to another, narrower, loss in the 1981 elections.

== Grand coalition governments and first premiership (1984–1988) ==
In the 1984 elections (Peres' third election as Labor Party leader), the Alignment coalition won more seats than any other party, but the left-wing failed to win the majority of 61 seats needed to form a coalition on their own. Alignment and Likud agreed to an unusual "rotation" arrangement to form a grand coalition unity government during which, for the first twenty-five months, Peres would serve as prime minister and the Likud leader Yitzhak Shamir would be foreign minister, with the two swapping positions thereafter for the second half of the term.

=== First premiership (1984–1986) ===
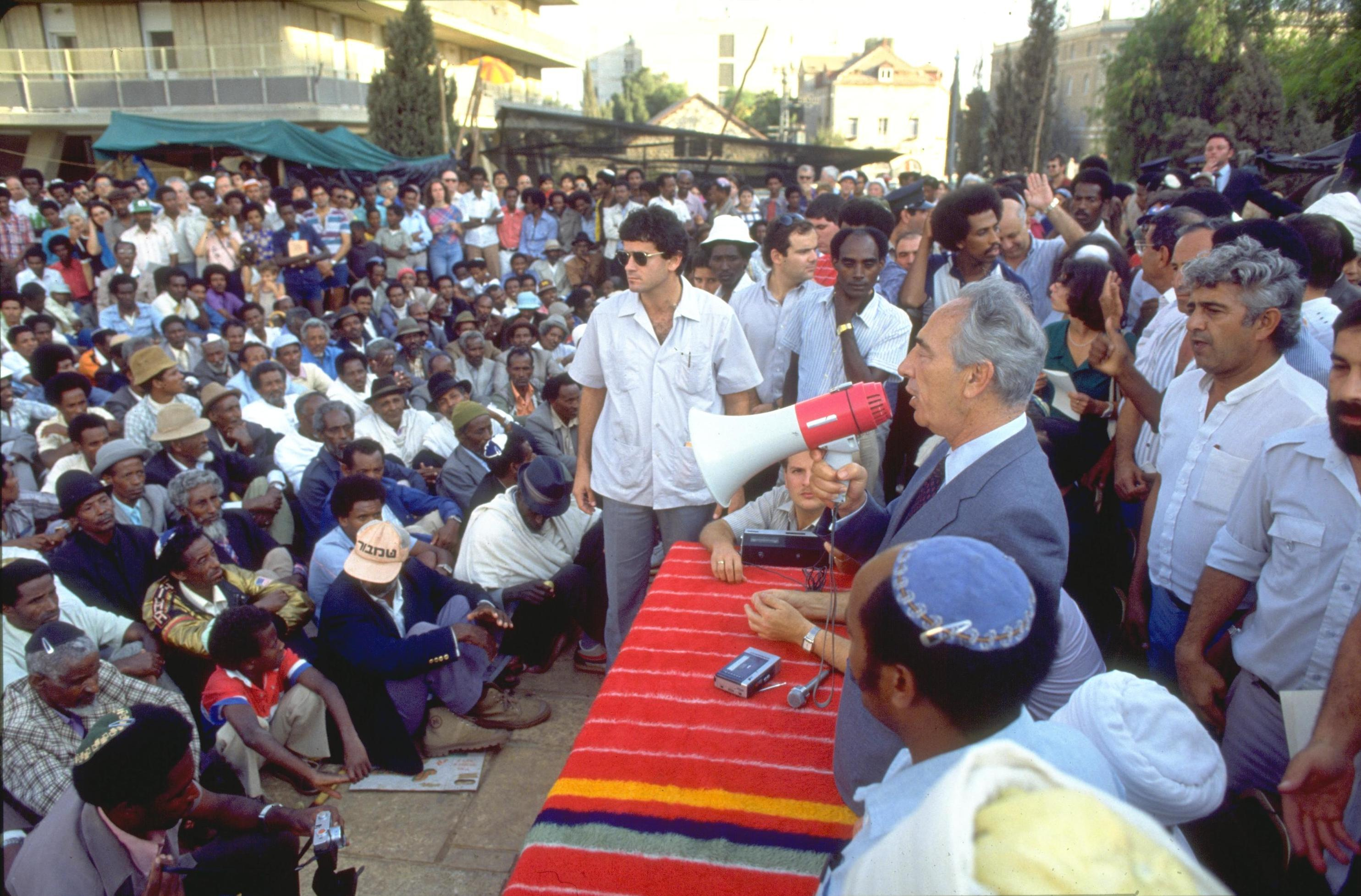
Prime Minister Peres delivers a speech in front of Ethiopian Jewish immigrants on 2 October 1985.

Peres was regarded to be a popular prime minister in his two years as premier under the rotation arrangement. During a portion of his premiership, he also held the position of minister of religious affairs.

==== Military policy and international relations ====
Among the most noteworthy moments of his first tenure as prime minister was Operation Wooden Leg (a long-range Israeli airstrike against the PLO headquarters in Tunisia) and a trip to Morocco to confer with King Hassan II.

In 1985, Peres publicly supported the quick pursuit of a military pullback from Beirut to Israel's south Lebanon security belt. A partial Israeli pullback had earlier been approved in 1983 by the Begin-headed Likud-led government that had been in power at that time.

==== 1985 Israel Economic Stabilization Plan ====
A major domestic policy decision of Peres' first premiership was the implementation of the 1985 Israel Economic Stabilization Plan.

By 1985, Israel's economic fortunes were looking dire, with immense and quickly rising inflation (Israel was experiencing hyperinflation), a government budget deficit equal to between twelve and fifteen percent of the nation's GDP and national debt equal to 220% of the nation's GDP, and Israel's foreign currency reserves were quickly dissipating. With the assistance of the government of the United States, Peres assembled a board of American economist to advise him on the situation. Conditional on him implementing reforms, Peres secured emergency economic assistance from the United States of $750 million (equivalent to 3.5% of the nation's GDP at the time) annually over a two-year period.

Peres was initially hesitant to take the drastic measures that he ultimately would pursue, as they had the strong potential of proving unpopular and came with a risk of potentially creating a drastic increase in unemployment. Peres ultimately was convinced to push through the 1985 Israel Economic Stabilization Plan. Once convinced, he was assertive in pushing for the passage of the program, which was quickly after approved by his cabinet on 1 July 1985. This program had quick success in improving the course of the Israeli economy. By the end of the year, inflation immensely decreased. Additionally, the shekel stabilized and the government balanced its budget. While Israel would subsequently slide into a recession, the stabilization has been regarded as an important and greatly successful model for addressing economies in crisis, and has been credited with saving the nation's economy.

=== Minister of Foreign Affairs (1986–1988) ===
As per the rotation arrangement, after Peres' two years as prime minister he and Shamir traded places in 1986. Shamir became prime minister of the new twenty-second government of Israel and Peres became foreign minister as well as the designated acting prime minister of Israel.

=== Minister of Finance (1988–1990) ===
In 1988 the Alignment, led by Peres, suffered another narrow defeat. This came despite the fact that polling in 1988 showed Peres to be the most popular politician in the nation. Peres agreed to renew the grand coalition with the Likud, this time conceding the premiership to Shamir for the entire term. In the grand coalition unity government of 1988–90 (the twenty-third government of Israel), Peres served as minister of finance and also continued to be the designated acting prime minister of Israel.

== Return to opposition (1990–1992) ==
=== "The dirty trick" ===
Peres and the Alignment finally left the government in 1990, after "the dirty trick" – a failed bid by Peres to form a narrow government based on a coalition of the Alignment, small leftist factions and ultra-orthodox parties. Peres' hope had been to create a Labor-led government that would be focused on peace talks with Palestine. Likud had declined proposals by the United States for Israel and Palestine to initiate what would have been the first peace talks between the two sides. Peres' longtime intra-party rival, Yizhak Rabin, had opposed to overthrowing the Likud-led coalition government. Peres succeeded in ending the government twenty-third government with a vote of no confidence. However, Peres was subsequently unable to assemble enough Knesset partners to form a pro-peace talk government. After two months, Shamir managed to form a Likud-led government with right-wing religious parties, establishing what was seen as the most conservative government coalition in the history of Israel up to that point.

=== Defeat in the 1992 Labor Party leadership election ===
Peres led the opposition in the Knesset from 1990 until early 1992, when he was defeated by Yitzhak Rabin in the Israeli Labor Party leadership election, the first leadership election held since the party formally merged with the other parties of Alignment, and the first leadership election open to participation by the party's entire membership. Peres remained active in politics, however.

== Rabin government (1992–1995) ==
After the Labor Party was successful in the 1992 Knesset election and Rabin became prime minister again, Peres became foreign minister in the Rabin-led twenty-fifth government of Israel. Peres had previously served as foreign minister from 1986 through 1988.

=== Israel–Jordan peace treaty ===
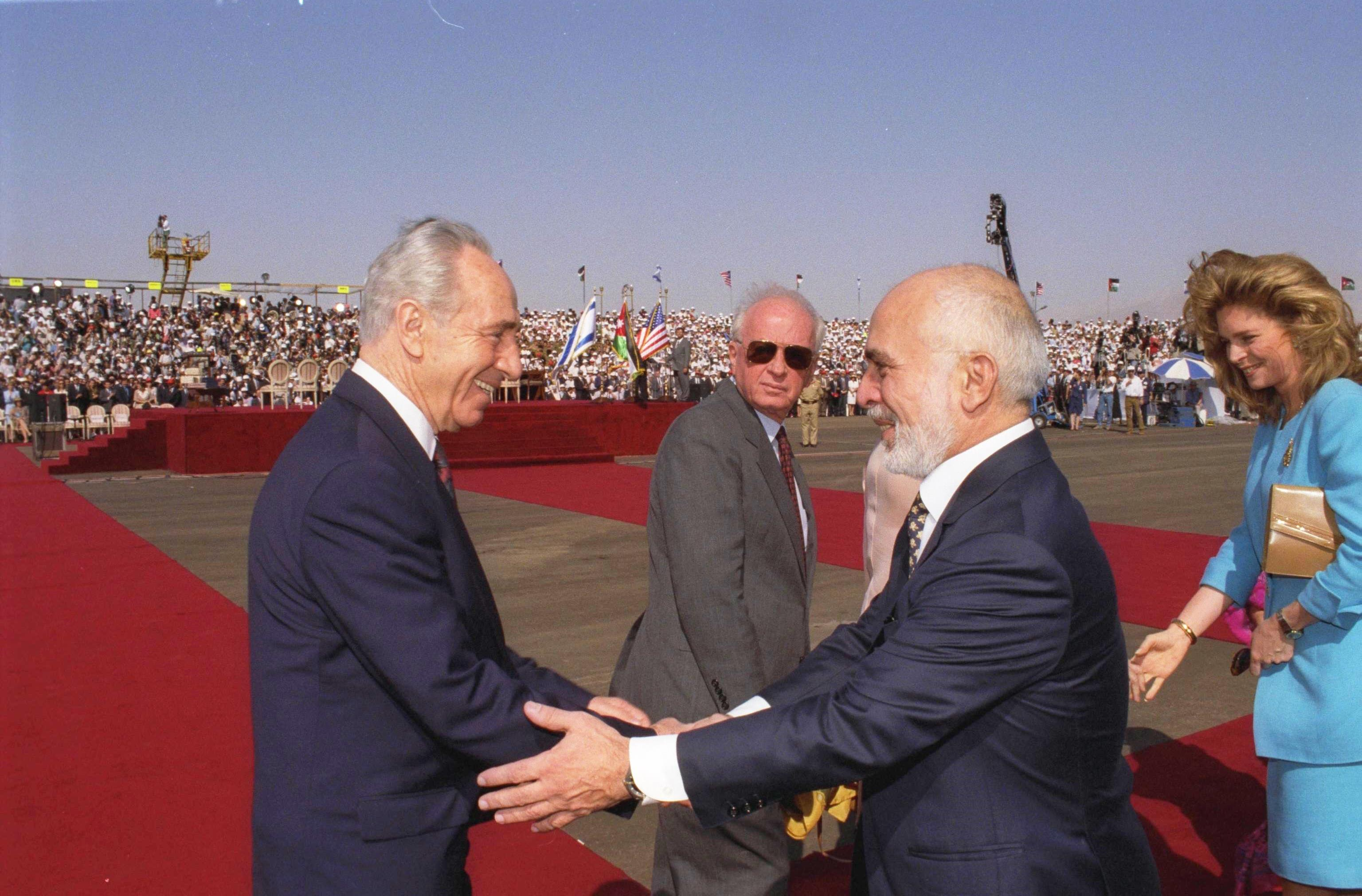
Shimon Peres (left) with Yitzhak Rabin (center) and King Hussein of Jordan (right), prior to signing the Israel–Jordan peace treaty

On 26 October 1994, Jordan and Israel signed the Israel–Jordan peace treaty, which had been initiated by Prime Minister Yitzhak Rabin and Foreign Minister Shimon Peres. The ceremony was held in the Arava valley of Israel, north of Eilat and near the Jordanian border. Prime Minister Rabin and Prime Minister Abdelsalam al-Majali signed the treaty and the president of Israel Ezer Weizman shook hands with King Hussein. United States president Bill Clinton observed, accompanied by United States Secretary of State Warren Christopher, as well as the foreign ministers of eleven other nations (including Russia, which had joined the United States as a formal co-sponsor of the peace talks that led to the treaty). The treaty brought an end to 46 years of official war between Israel and Jordan. It was only the second full peace agreement that Israel had reached with an Arab nation, after the Camp David Accords signed with Egypt in 1978.

=== Oslo peace process with Palestine ===
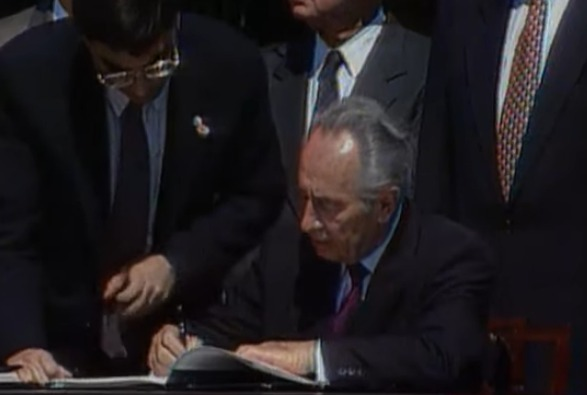
Peres signing Oslo I on 13 September 1993

Rabin's 1992 campaign for Labor had primarily been run on the idea of negotiating peace with the Palestinians. This campaign had succeeded as a peaceful resolution to the Israeli-Palestinian conflict was popular among the Israeli public at the time. The twenty-fifth government of Israel was arguably more pro-peace government than any previous Israeli government. It would begin negotiations with the Yasser Arafat-led Palestine Liberation Organization (PLO).

Peres was involved in secret peace negotiations between Prime Minister Rabin's government and Arafat's PLO organization. These negotiations were held over several months in 1992 and 1993. As part of the negotiations, Peres secretly flew to Oslo, Norway on 19 August 1993. The ultimate agreement outlined a peace process between Israel and Palestine, which would include the establishment of an interim Palestinian government within both the Gaza Strip and the West Bank. On 13 September 1993, Peres signed the initial Oslo I Accord on behalf of the Israeli government in a ceremony at the United States' White House, with Rabin in attendance.

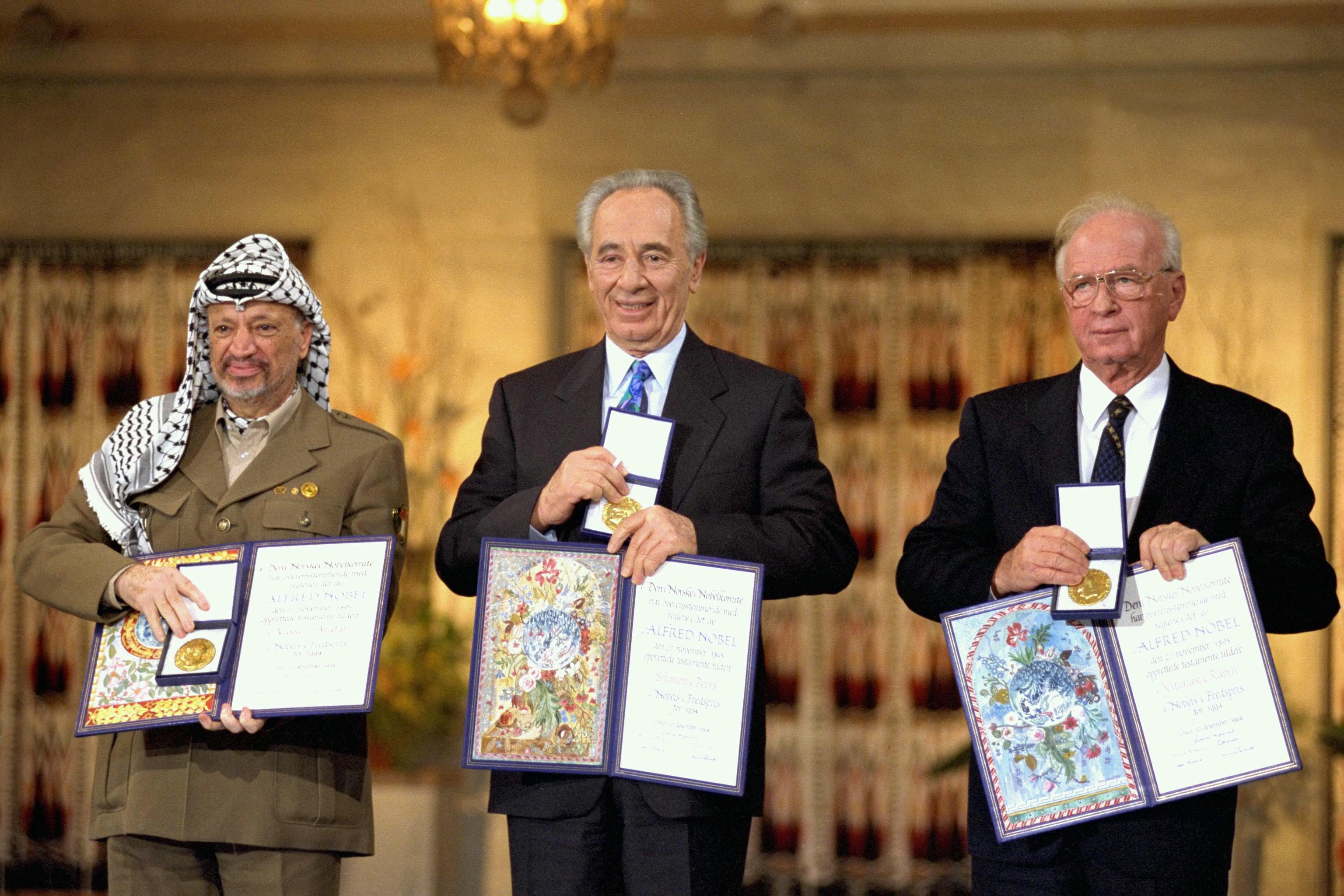
Yitzhak Rabin, Shimon Peres and Yasser Arafat receiving the Nobel Peace Prize following the Oslo Accords

In 1994, in recognition of the Oslo Accords, Peres, Rabin and Arafat were jointly awarded the Nobel Peace Prize. This was the second (and most recent) instance in which an Israeli was awarded the Nobel Peace Prize. Then-Prime Minister Menachem Begin had previously jointly received the honor with Egyptian president Anwar Sadat in 1978. This was also the second time that the award had been given in recognition of middle east peacemaking efforts, with the 1978 award having been the previous instance of this. The awarding of the prize to the three has not been without controversy. After it was decided they would be given the award, Kåre Kristiansen resigned from the Nobel Peace Prize committee in protest of Arafat receiving the award, believing Arafat to be, "too tainted by violence, terror and torture". In 2002, a number of members of the Norwegian committee that awards the annual Nobel Peace Prize would state they regretted that Mr. Peres's prize could not be recalled. Because he had not acted to prevent Israel's re-occupation of Palestinian territory, he had not lived up to the ideals he expressed when he accepted the prize, and he was involved in human rights abuses.

Negotiations on further terms continued, with Peres continuing to be an integral player. On 28 September 1995, Rabin and Arafat jointly signed a second major agreement, which has popularly been referred to as "Oslo II".

== Second premiership (1995–1996) ==
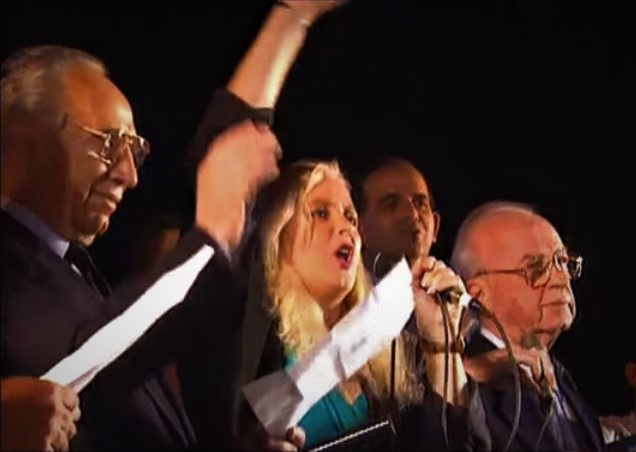
Peres (far left) and Prime Minister Yitzhak Rabin (far right) during the 4 November 1995 peace rally at which Rabin was assassinated

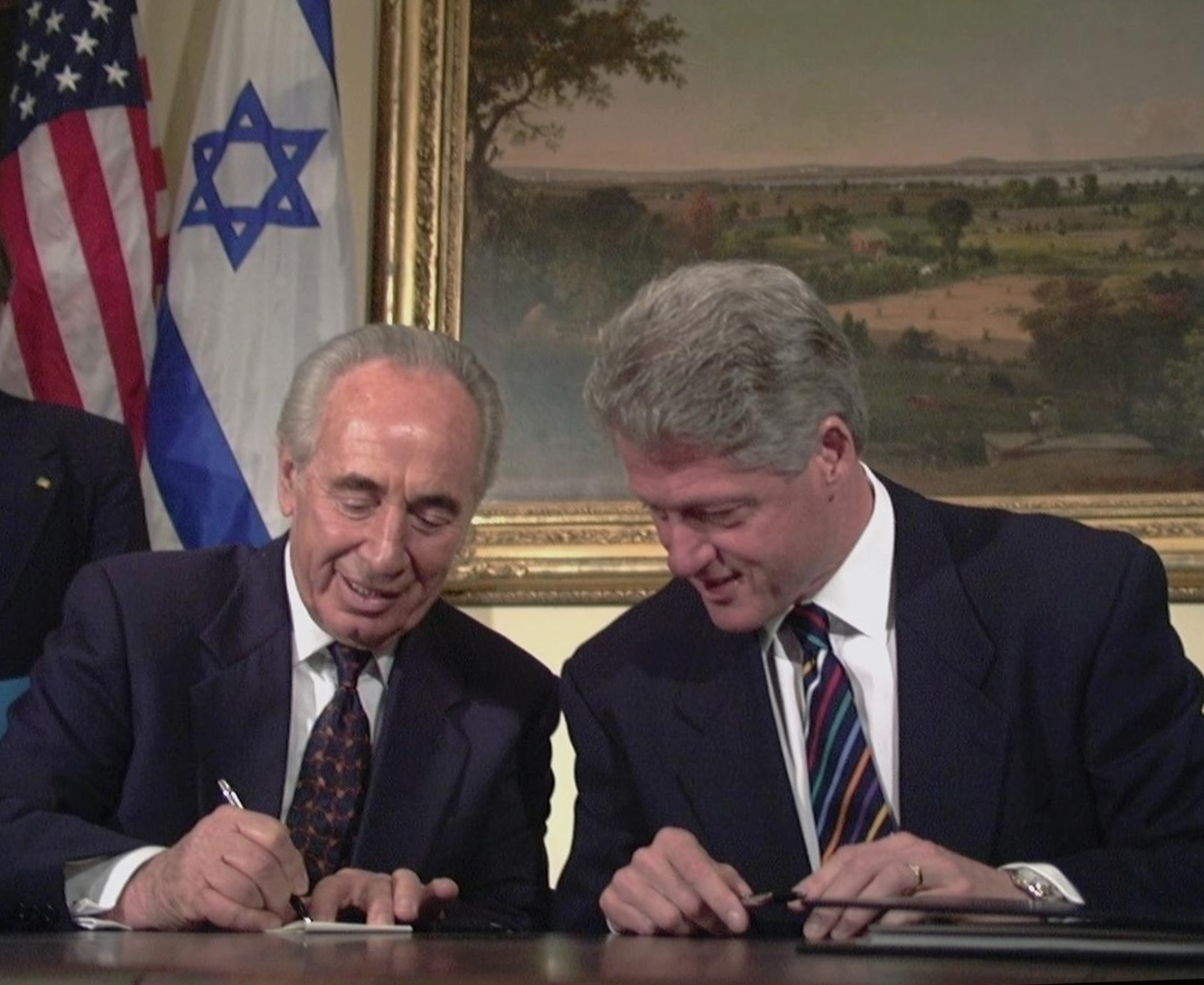
Shimon Peres with U.S. president Bill Clinton at the White House, April 1996

While the Oslo peace policies, at the time, enjoyed the support of most Israelis, they also faced intense opposition from extreme members of Israel's right-wing. In response to intense street protests by right-wing opponents of the Oslo peace process, a coalition of left-wing parties and peace groups organized a rally in support of the peace process in Tel Aviv's Kings Square on 4 November 1995, which both Prime Minister Rabin and Peres attended. While making his way from the stage to his car after concluding his speech to the gathered crowd of more than 100,000 people, Rabin was assassinated by Yigal Amir, a right-wing Israeli Jew who opposed the peace process.

After Rabin's assassination, Peres was made acting prime minister and acting defense minister of a provisional government. On 14 November 1995, the Labor Party confirmed Peres as its new leader, which thereby cleared the last formality before he could be invited by President Ezer Weizman to form a new government. On 15 November 1995, Peres was invited by to form a new government. On 21 November, Peres signed a coalition agreement between Labor, Meretz and Yiud (which had been members of Rabin's government), which was formally approved by the Knesset the next day, establishing a new government with Peres as prime minister.

Peres' second stint as prime minister ultimately lasted a total of seven months. During this time, he attempted to maintain the momentum of the peace process.

On 10 February 1996, Peres made the widely expected announcement that he would call early elections, moving the elections to late May, five months earlier than they otherwise were to be held. The election would be the first to use a new system in which the prime minister was directly elected in a vote coinciding with the Knesset election. Peres had hoped that early elections would deliver a mandate for his pursuit of a two-state solution. Peres had called the elections early because of promising polls. He was heavily leading in the polls for the prime minister vote at the time the election was called, with polls showing him to have between a twenty and twenty-five percent lead. Additionally, Labor was also leading in polls for the Knesset vote. Despite the promising polls, however, some in Labor had, even at this time, expressed concerns about the ability of Peres to win, given his failure to deliver an outright win for the Labor Party during his earlier stint as party leader. His lead in the polls began to decrease after the Jaffa Road bus bombings on 25 February 1996. However, even in the last month before the election, he enjoyed a reduced leading margin of around five percent.

On 11 April 1996, Peres initiated Operation Grapes of Wrath, which was triggered by Hezbollah Katyusha rockets fired into Israel in response to the killing of two Lebanese by an IDF missile. Israel conducted massive air raids and extensive shelling in southern Lebanon. 106 Lebanese civilians died in the shelling of Qana, when a UN compound was hit in an Israeli shelling.

During his term, Peres promoted the use of the internet in Israel and created the first website of an Israeli prime minister.

== Post-premiership (1996–2007) ==
=== Labor in opposition (1996–1999) ===
Peres was narrowly defeated by Benjamin Netanyahu in the 1996 Israeli prime ministerial election. Not included in the new government, Labor became an opposition party again. This again placed Peres in the then-unofficial role of Knesset opposition leader.

In 1996, Peres founded the Peres Center for Peace, which has the aim of "promot[ing] lasting peace and advancement in the Middle East by fostering tolerance, economic and technological development, cooperation and well-being."

Peres did not seek re-election as Labor Party leader in 1997 and was replaced by Ehud Barak that year. Barak rebuffed Peres' attempt to secure the position of party president.

=== Minister of Regional Cooperation (1999–2001) ===
In 1999, Ehud Barak was elected prime minister and formed a Labor-lead government. He appointed Peres (who was seen as a political rival of Barak) to the minor post of minister of regional cooperation. The position was vaguely defined, being expected to be tasked with advancing economic and political ties between Israel and the Arab world. The position also did not come with any government funding. Peres accepted the relatively low-ranked position reluctantly. For nearly all of time in this position Peres was sidelined, finding himself disallowed from playing a major role within the government.

On 1 November 2000, amid the Second Intifada, Peres met in the Gaza Strip with Arafat on behalf of the Israeli government. The two agreed to terms of a truce in the early hours of the following morning.

After the resignation of Ezer Weizman, Peres ran in the 2000 Israeli presidential election, seeking to be elected by members of the Knesset to a seven-year term as Israel's president (a ceremonial head of state position which usually authorizes the selection of Prime Minister). However, he lost to Likud candidate Moshe Katsav. Katsav's victory was regarded to be in reaction to the perceived indications that Peres intended to use the presidency to provide his support to the increasingly unpopular peace processes that Barak's government was pursuing. His defeat was considered a significant upset, as he had been regarded as a heavy front-runner to win the Knesset vote. The editorial board of the Los Angeles Times wrote that his defeat appeared to spell the end of Peres' long political career.

There was consideration given later that year to Peres potentially seeking the premiership again. On 20 November 2000, amid polls showing him to be in a virtual-tie with Ariel Sharon, an aide of Peres told the media that he would run in the 2001 direct election for prime minister. Peres himself told lawmakers that he intended to run. Despite this, Peres did not become a candidate. In January 2001, there was some talk among Cabinet members that it would be best for Peres to be the candidate of the left. However, this did not happen. In early January 2001, in a joint television appearance with Barak that promoted the government's intent to work towards peace, Peres told the media that his own goal was, "not to become prime minister", but was instead, "to do the best for the state of Israel."

=== Minister of Foreign Affairs (2001–2002) ===
Following Barak's defeat by Ariel Sharon in the 2001 direct election for prime minister, Peres made yet another comeback. He helped with bringing Labor into a grand coalition unity government with Sharon's Likud (the Twenty-ninth government of Israel) and secured himself the post of foreign minister. In 2001, formal leadership of Labor passed to Binyamin Ben-Eliezer, and in 2002 it was passed to Amram Mitzna. Peres grew to be heavily criticized by many on the left, who accused him of clinging to his position as foreign minister in a government that was not seen as advancing the peace process. Left critics accused Peres of not acting in accordance with his own dovish stance. Peres resigned from his post as foreign minister when Labor left the unity government in advance of the 2003 Knesset election. Labor's departure from the unity government placed Labor in the opposition ahead of the 2003 Knesset election.

=== Interim Labor Party leader (2003–2005) ===
After the Labor Party suffered a crushing defeat in the 2003 Knesset election while under the leadership of Mitzna, Peres was made interim leader of the party on 19 June 2003.

==== Vice Prime Minister (2005) ====
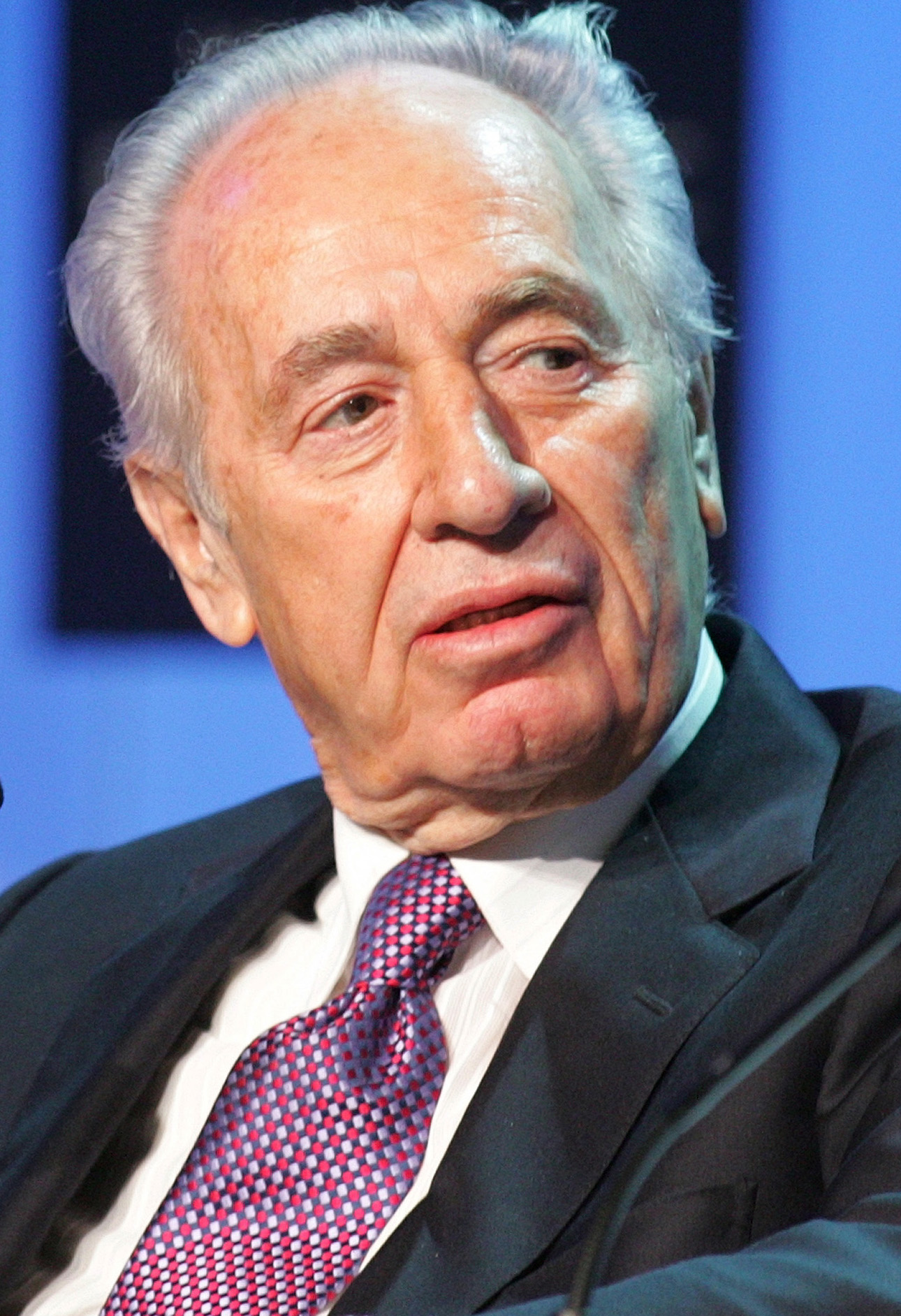
Peres in 2005

Peres led the Labor Party into a coalition with Sharon once more, reaching an agreement the end of 2004, and entering the party into the thirtieth government of Israel in January 2005. This came after the Sharon's support of "disengagement" from Gaza presented a diplomatic program that Labor could support. Sharon made Peres vice prime minister.

As interim party leader, Peres favored putting off the elections for as long as possible. He claimed that an early election would jeopardize both the September 2005 Gaza withdrawal plan and the standing of the party in a national unity government with Sharon. However, the majority pushed for an earlier date, as younger members of the party, among them Amir Peretz, Ophir Pines-Paz and Isaac Herzog, overtook established leaders such as Binyamin Ben-Eliezer and Haim Ramon in the party ballot to divide up government portfolios.

=== Loss of Labor Party leadership and defection to Kadima ===
Peres lost a bid for permanent leadership of the Labor Party to Amir Peretz in the November 2005 leadership election, held in advance of the 2006 elections. Peres received 40% of the vote to Peretz's 42.4%.

Labor withdrew from the unity government on 23 November 2005. On 30 November 2005 Peres announced that he was leaving the Labor Party to support Ariel Sharon and his new Kadima party. In the immediate aftermath of Sharon's debilitating stroke days later (which left Sharon in a coma), there was speculation that Peres might take over as leader of the Kadima party; most senior Kadima leaders, however, were former members of Likud and indicated their support for Ehud Olmert as Sharon's successor. Labor reportedly tried to woo Peres to rejoin them. However, he announced that he supported Olmert and would remain with Kadima. Peres had previously announced his intention not to run in the March 2006 elections, but changed his mind.

Peres resigned from the Knesset on 15 January 2006 due both to Attorney General Menahem Mazuz issuing a decision that ruled Peres and several others could not be appointed to ministerial posts by Prime Minister Olmert and because of a law that, due to him having switched parties, would have prevented him from running for the next Knesset if he remained an incumbent member of the Knesset. By that time, he had served in the Knesset for more than forty-six consecutive years.

Peres was soon elected back to the Knesset in the 2006 election, this time as a member of Kadima. After the new Kadima-led thirty-first government was formed, Peres was given the role of vice prime minister and minister for the development of the Negev, Galilee and Regional Economy.

== Presidency (2007–2014) ==
Shimon Peres in December 2007 (audio)

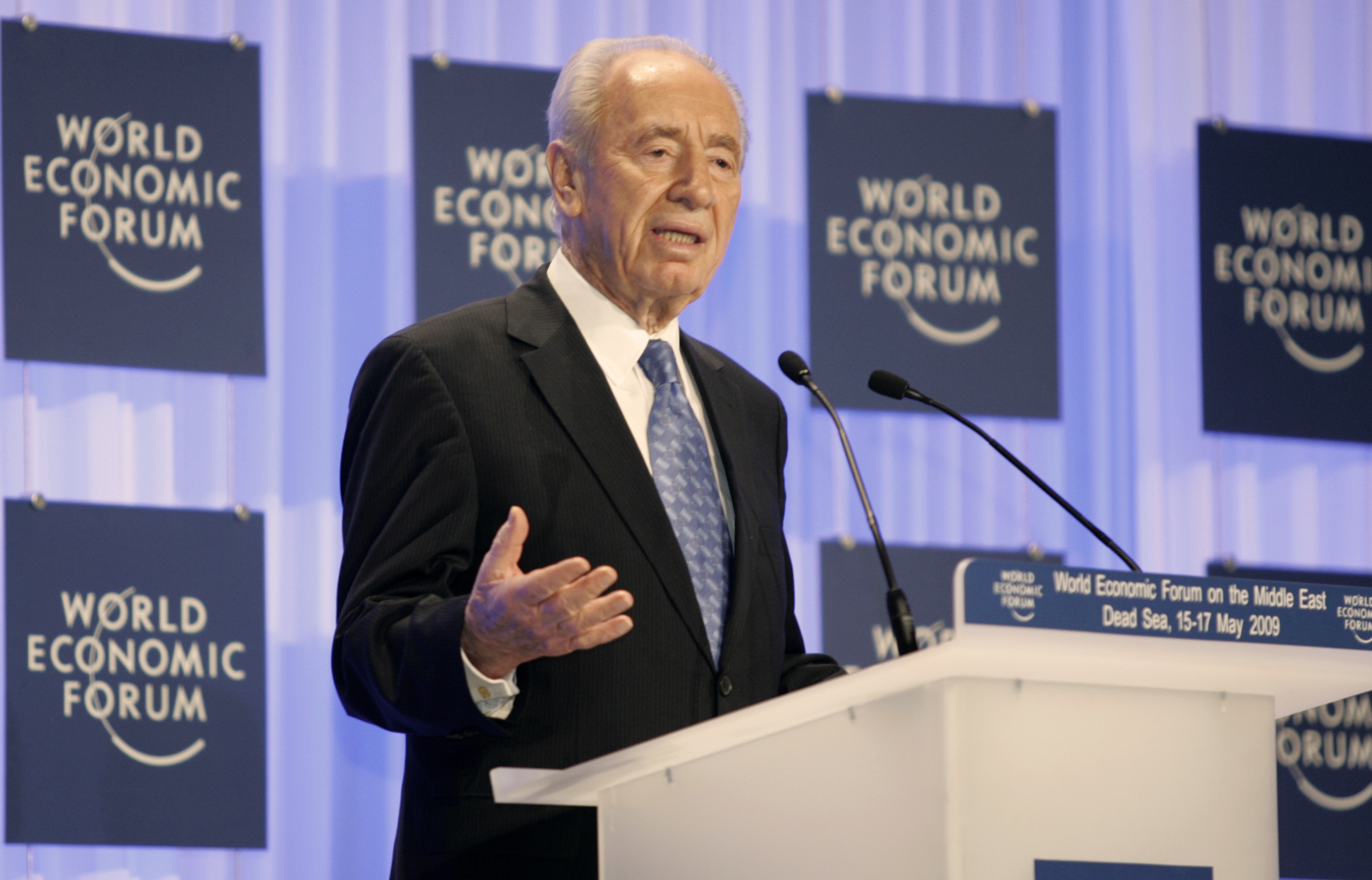
Shimon Peres at the World Economic Forum on the Middle East (2009)

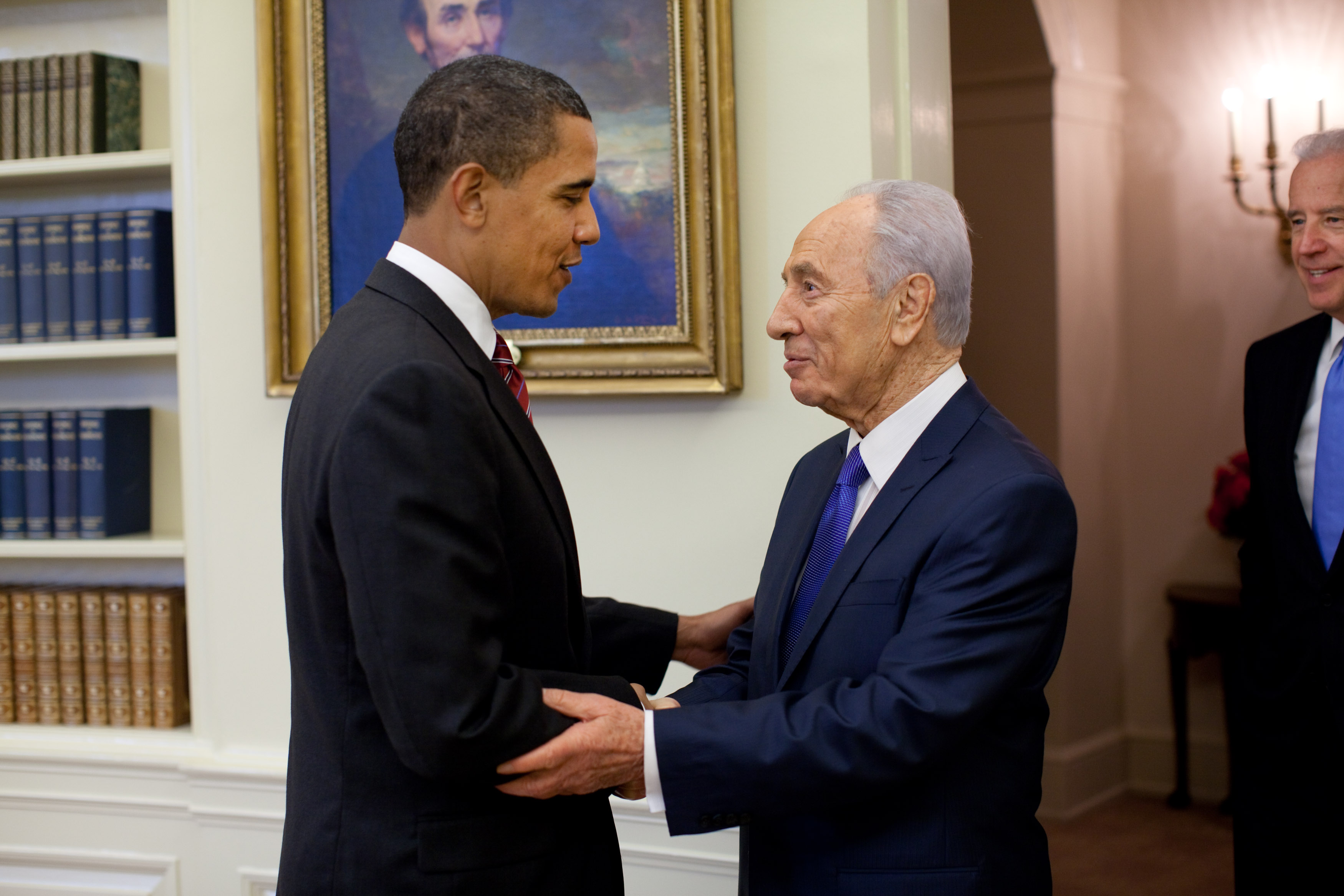
Shimon Peres meeting with U.S. president Barack Obama and Vice President Joe Biden in the Oval Office, 5 May 2009

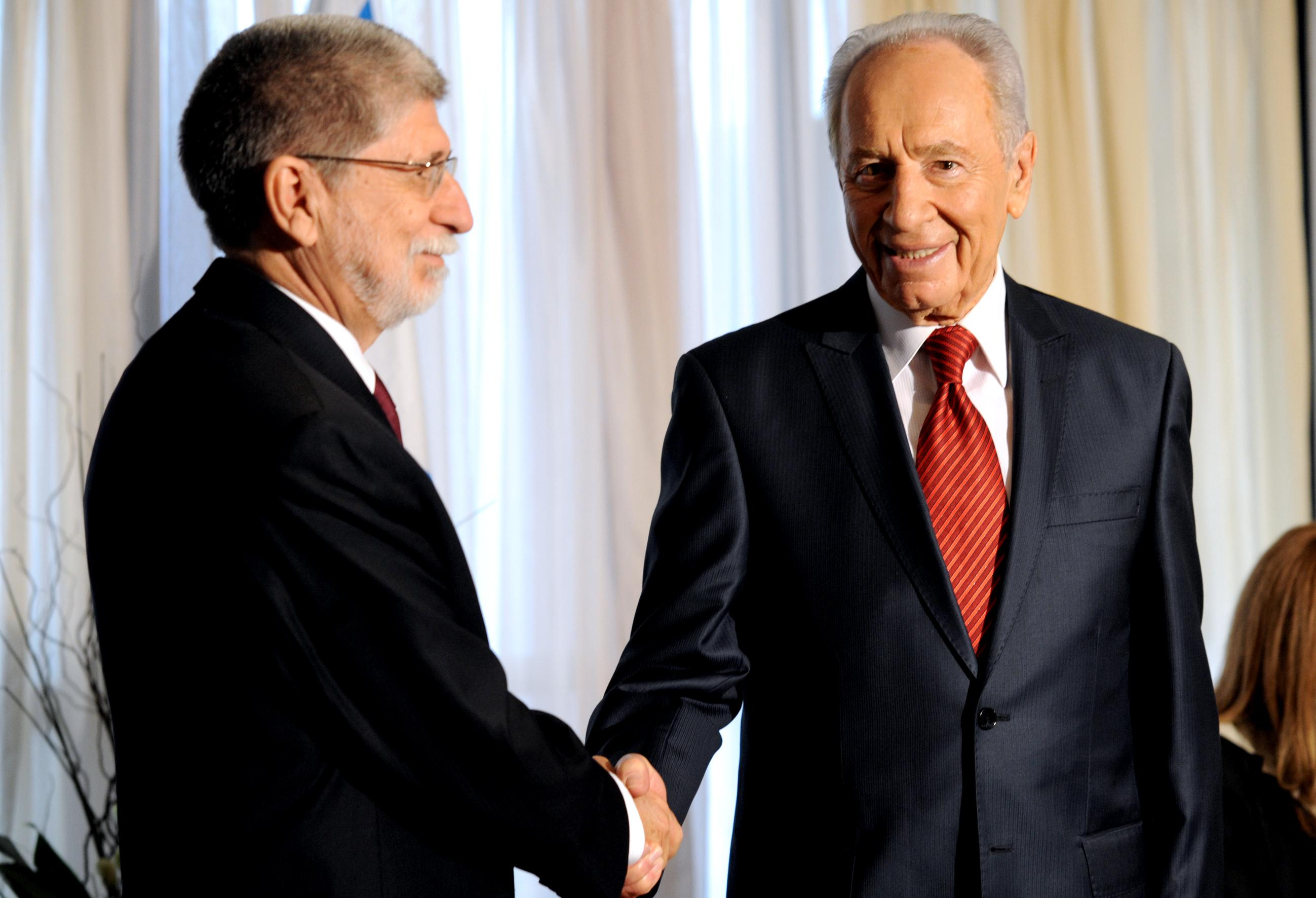
Shimon Peres and the foreign minister of Brazil, Celso Amorim, meet in Brasília, 11 November 2009

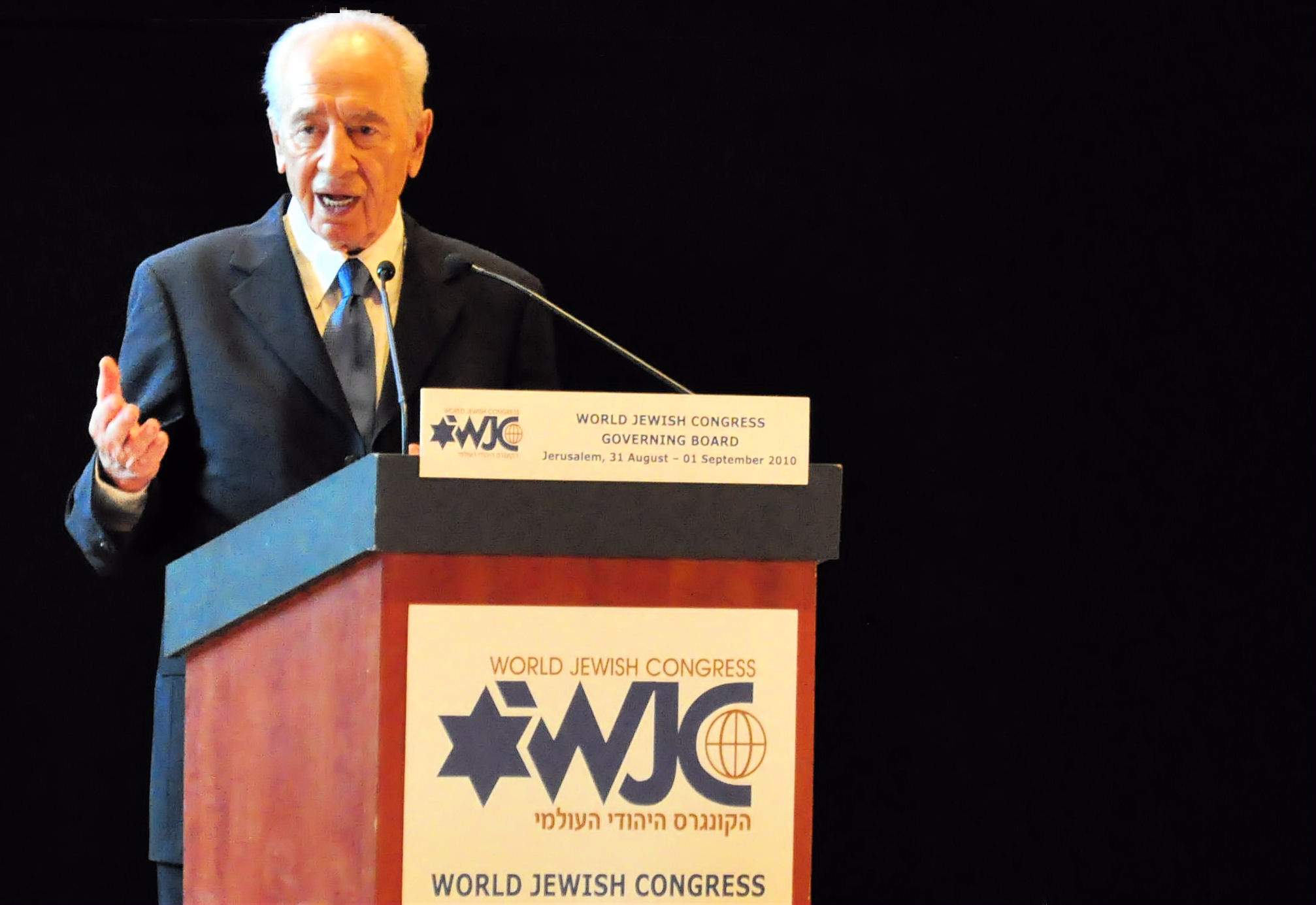
Shimon Peres addressing a gathering of the World Jewish Congress in Jerusalem (2010)

On 13 June 2007, Peres was elected president of the State of Israel by the Knesset. 58 of 120 members of the Knesset voted for him in the first round (whereas 38 voted for Reuven Rivlin, and 21 for Colette Avital). His opponents then backed Peres in the second round and 86 members of the Knesset voted in his favor, while 23 objected. He resigned from his role as a member of the Knesset the same day, having been a member since November 1959 (except for a three-month period in early 2006), the longest serving in Israeli political history. Peres was sworn in as president on 15 July 2007.

Israel must not only be an asset but a value. A moral, cultural and scientific call for the promotion of man, every man. It must be a good and warm home for Jews who are not Israelis, as well as for Israelis who are not Jews. And it must create equal opportunities for all, without discriminating between religion, nationality, community or sex... I have seen Israel in its most difficult hours and also in moments of achievement and spiritual uplifting. My years place me at an observation point from which can be viewed the scene of our reviving nation, spread out in all its glory... Permit me to remain an optimist. Permit me to be a dreamer of his people. If sometimes the atmosphere is autumnal, and also if today, the day seems suddenly grey, the president Israel has chosen will never tire of encouraging, awakening and reminding - because spring is waiting for us. The spring will definitely come.

— Shimon Peres, President's inaugural address, July 2007

On 20 November 2008, Peres received an honorary knighthood, Knight Grand Cross of the Order of St Michael and St George from Queen Elizabeth II in Buckingham Palace in London.

In June 2011, he was awarded the honorary title of sheikh by Bedouin dignitaries in Hura for his efforts to achieve Middle East peace. Peres thanks his hosts by saying "This visit has been a pleasure. I am deeply impressed by Hura. You have done more for yourselves than anyone else could have". He told the mayor of Hura, Dr. Muhammad Al-Nabari, and members of Hura's governing council, that they were "part of the Negev. It cannot be developed without developing the Bedouin community, so that it may keep its traditions while joining the modern world."

== Post-presidency and death ==
Peres announced in April 2013 that he would not seek to extend his tenure beyond 2014. His successor, Reuven Rivlin, was elected on 10 June 2014 and took office on 24 July 2014.

In July 2016, Peres founded the 'Israel innovation center' in the Arab neighbourhood of Ajami, Jaffa, aiming to encourage young people from around the world to be inspired by technology.

On 13 September 2016, Peres suffered a severe stroke and was hospitalized at Sheba Medical Center. His condition was reported to be very serious, as he had suffered a massive brain hemorrhage and significant bleeding. Two days later, he was reported as being in a serious but stable condition. However, on 26 September, an examination found irreversible damage to his brainstem, indicating that it was not possible for him to recover, and the following day, his medical condition deteriorated significantly. He died on 28 September at the age of 93.

=== Tributes ===
On hearing of his death, tributes came from leaders across the world. The president of Russia, Vladimir Putin said: "I was extremely lucky to have met this extraordinary man many times. And every time I admired his courage, patriotism, wisdom, vision and ability." The president of China, Xi Jinping said: "His death is the loss of an old friend for China." The president of India, Pranab Mukherjee said: "Peres would be remembered as a steadfast friend of India." The President of the United States, Barack Obama said: "I will always be grateful that I was able to call Shimon my friend."

Peres was described by The New York Times as having done "more than anyone to build up his country's formidable military might, then [having] worked as hard to establish a lasting peace with Israel's Arab neighbors."

=== Funeral ===
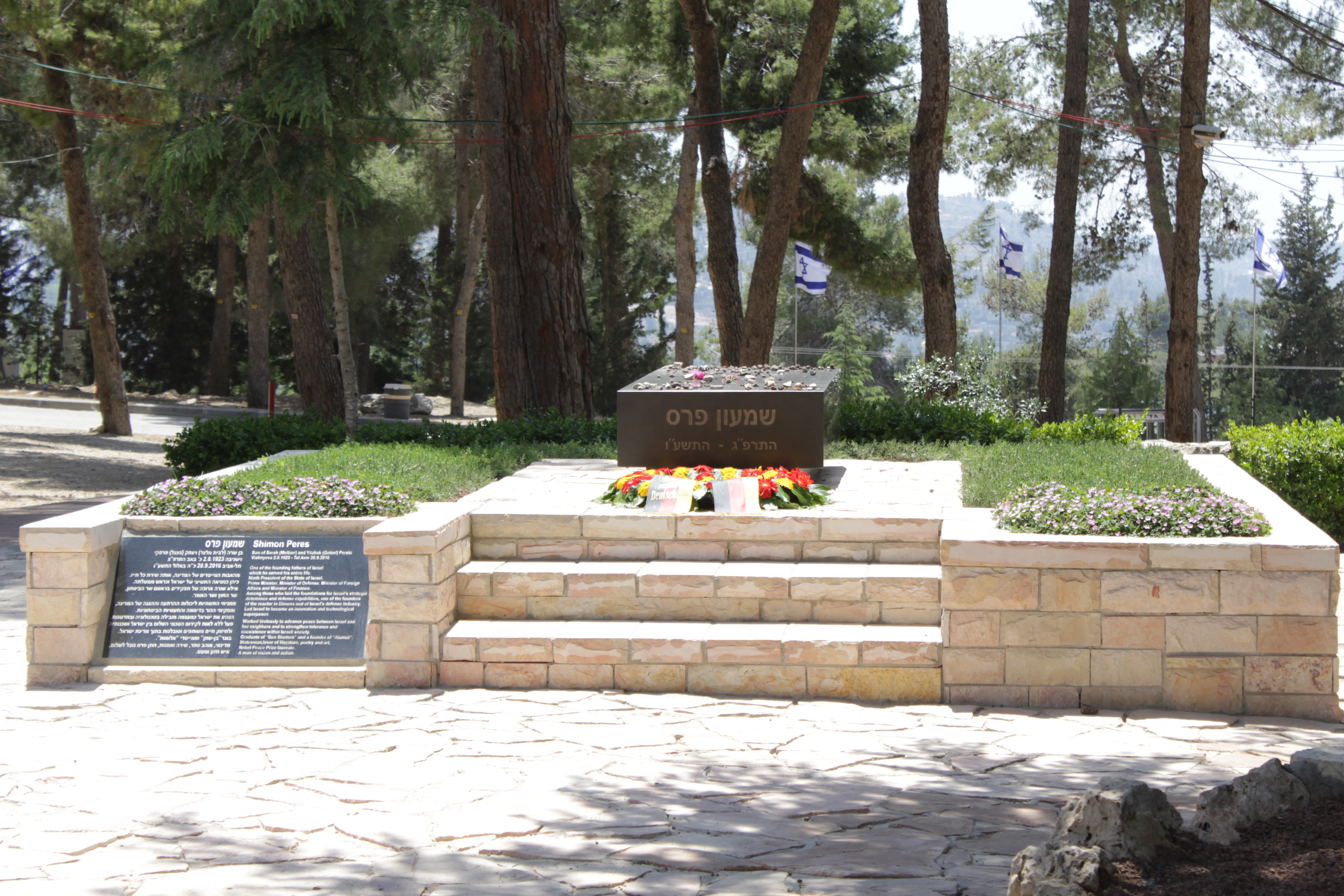
Peres's grave on the Great Leaders of the Nation section of Mount Herzl

The funeral was held at Mount Herzl in Jerusalem on 30 September 2016, with his burial place in the Great Leaders of the Nation section between former Israeli prime ministers Yitzhak Rabin and Yitzhak Shamir.

About 4,000 mourners and world leaders from 75 countries attended the funeral, with President Barack Obama among those who gave a eulogy. Since the funeral for Nelson Mandela, this was only the second time Obama traveled overseas for the funeral of a foreign leader. Prime Minister Benjamin Netanyahu also spoke. Among the other delegates in attendance and speaking were former president Bill Clinton. Other delegates included PA President Mahmoud Abbas, President François Hollande of France, Prime Minister Justin Trudeau of Canada, German President Joachim Gauck, President Enrique Peña Nieto of Mexico and King Felipe VI of Spain. The UK delegation included Prince Charles, Foreign Secretary Boris Johnson, former prime ministers David Cameron, Gordon Brown, and Tony Blair, and Britain's chief rabbi Ephraim Mirvis.

== Political views ==
Peres described himself as a "Ben-Gurionist", after his mentor Ben-Gurion. He felt that Jewish sovereignty in the Land of Israel was a means to a progressive end in which the State of Israel both inspire the world and survive in a region of the world where it was unwelcome.

As a younger man, Peres was once considered a "hawk". He was a protégé of Ben-Gurion and Dayan and an early supporter of the West Bank settlers during the 1970s. However, after becoming the leader of his party his stance evolved. Subsequently, he was seen as a dove, and a strong supporter of peace through economic cooperation. While still opposed, like all mainstream Israeli leaders in the 1970s and early 1980s, to talks with the PLO, he distanced himself from settlers and spoke of the need for "territorial compromise" over the West Bank and Gaza. For a time he hoped that King Hussein of Jordan could be Israel's Arab negotiating partner rather than Yasser Arafat. Peres met secretly with Hussein in London in 1987 and reached a framework agreement with him, but this was rejected by Israel's then Prime Minister, Yitzhak Shamir. Shortly afterward the First Intifada erupted, and whatever plausibility King Hussein had as a potential Israeli partner in resolving the fate of the West Bank evaporated. Subsequently, Peres gradually moved closer to support for talks with the PLO, although he avoided making an outright commitment to this policy until 1993.

Peres was perhaps more closely associated with the Oslo Accords than any other Israeli politician (Rabin included) with the possible exception of his own protégé, Yossi Beilin. He remained an adamant supporter of the Oslo Accords and the Palestinian Authority since their inception despite the First Intifada and the al-Aqsa Intifada (Second Intifada). However, Peres supported Ariel Sharon's military policy of operating the Israel Defense Forces to thwart suicide bombings.

Peres's foreign policy outlook was markedly realist. To placate Turkey, Peres downplayed the Armenian genocide. Peres stated: "We reject attempts to create a similarity between the Holocaust and the Armenian allegations. Nothing similar to the Holocaust occurred. It is a tragedy what the Armenians went through but not a genocide." Although Peres himself did not retract the statement, the Israeli Foreign Ministry later issued a cable to its missions which stated that "The minister absolutely did not say, as the Turkish news agency alleged, 'What the Armenians underwent was a tragedy, not a genocide.'" However, according to Armenian news agencies, the statement released by the Israeli consulate in Los Angeles did not include any mention that Peres had not said that the events were not genocide.

On the issue of the nuclear program of Iran and the supposed existential threat this poses for Israel, Peres stated, "I am not in favor of a military attack on Iran, but we must quickly and decisively establish a strong, aggressive coalition of nations that will impose painful economic sanctions on Iran", adding "Iran's efforts to achieve nuclear weapons should keep the entire world from sleeping soundly." In the same speech, Peres compared Iranian president Mahmoud Ahmadinejad and his call to "wipe Israel off the map" to the genocidal threats to European Jewry made by Adolf Hitler in the years prior to the Holocaust. In an interview with Army Radio on 8 May 2006 he remarked that "the president of Iran should remember that Iran can also be wiped off the map." However, after his death it was revealed that Peres had said that he prevented a military strike on Iran's nuclear program that had been ordered by Benjamin Netanyahu and Ehud Barak in 2010.

Peres was a proponent of Middle East economic integration.

=== Technology ===
Peres is regarded as one of the founders of Israel's technology sector. Through personal meetings with the French government, he established collaboration treaties with France's nuclear industry in 1954. In 1958, he founded the re-organized RAFAEL Armament Development Authority, under the MOD's jurisdiction. From his desk he would control all aspects of Israel's nuclear program (first as director general and after 1959 as deputy minister). In the 1980s, he is credited with having laid the economic foundations for Israel's start-up economy. In later years, he developed an obsessive fascination with nanotechnology and brain research. He believed that brain research would be the key to a better and more peaceful future. He launched his own nanotechnology investment fund in 2003, raising $5 million in the first week. In 2016, he founded the 'Israel innovation center' in the Arab neighbourhood of Ajami, Jaffa. The center aims to encourage young people from around the world to be inspired by technology. Laying its foundation stone on 21 July 2016, Peres said: "We will prove that innovation has no limits and no barriers. Innovation enables dialogue between nations and between people. It will enable all young people – Jews, Muslims and Christians — to engage in science and technology equally."

== Personal life and family ==
In May 1945, Peres married Sonya Gelman, whom he had met in the Ben Shemen Youth Village, where her father served as a carpentry teacher. The couple married after Sonya finished her military service as a truck driver in the British Army during World War II. Through the years Sonya chose to stay away from the media and keep her privacy and the privacy of her family, despite her husband's extensive political career. Sonya Peres was unable to attend Shimon's 2007 presidential inauguration ceremony because of ill health. With the election of Peres for president, Sonya Peres, who had not wanted her husband to accept the position, announced that she would stay in the couple's apartment in Tel Aviv and not join her husband in Jerusalem. The couple thereafter lived separately. She died on 20 January 2011, aged 87, from heart failure at her apartment in Tel Aviv.

Shimon and Sonya Peres had three children. Their eldest child was a daughter, Dr. Tsvia ("Tsiki") Walden, who became a linguist and professor at Beit Berl Academic College. Their middle child was a son, Yoni, who became director of Village Veterinary Center, a veterinary hospital on the campus of Kfar Hayarok Agricultural School near Tel Aviv. He specializes in the treatment of guide dogs. Their youngest child, Nehemia ("Chemi"), became co-founder and managing general partner of Pitango Venture Capital, one of Israel's largest venture capital funds. Chemi Peres is a former helicopter pilot in the IAF.

Peres was a cousin of actress Lauren Bacall (born Betty Joan Perske), although the two only discovered their relation to each other in the 1950s. Recalling this, Peres once remarked, "In 1952 or 1953 I came to New York... Lauren Bacall called me, said that she wanted to meet, and we did. We sat and talked about where our families came from, and discovered that we were from the same family".

Peres was a polyglot, speaking Polish, French, English, Russian, Yiddish, and Hebrew. He never lost his Polish accent when speaking in Hebrew.

=== Poetry and song-writing ===
Peres was a lifelong writer of poetry and songs. As a child in Vishnyeva, Poland he learned to play the mandolin. He wrote his first song when he was 8. He was inspired to write, including during cabinet meetings. Peres was noted to sometimes write stanzas during Cabinet meetings. As a result of his deep literary interests, he could quote from Hebrew prophets, French literature, and Chinese philosophy with equal ease. Many of his poems were turned into songs, with the proceedings of the albums going to charity. His songs have been performed by artists including Andrea Bocelli and Liel Kolet. The most recent of his songs was "Chinese Melody" (recorded in Mandarin with Chinese and Israeli musicians), released in February 2016, which he wrote to celebrate the Year of the Monkey (Music Video of 'Chinese Melody' on YouTube).

=== Use of social media ===
During his presidency (2007–2014), Shimon Peres was noted for his embrace of social media to communicate with the public, being described as "Israel's first social media president", which included producing comedic videos on his YouTube channel such as "Be my Friend for Peace" and "Former Israeli President Shimon Peres Goes Job Hunting". After retirement, he led a viral campaign to encourage children to study mathematics. In one video, he sends his answer to the teacher by throwing a paper plane (Video: Shimon Peres throws a paper airplane in the name of education on YouTube). According to The Wall Street Journal, his presence on platforms such as Snapchat, allowed him to "pack more punch—and humor—into the causes he championed, especially peaceful coexistence with the Palestinians."

== Places named after Peres ==
Following his death, it was announced that Israel's Negev nuclear reactor and atomic research center, that had been constructed in 1958, would be named after Peres. Netanyahu stated: "Shimon Peres worked hard to establish this important facility, a facility which has been very important for Israel's security for generations.."

== Published works ==
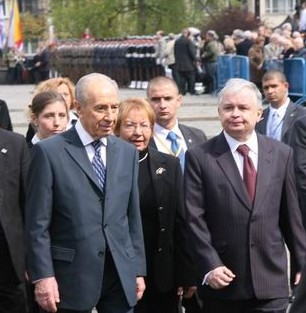
Peres at the 65th Anniversary of the Warsaw Ghetto Uprising ceremony with Polish president Lech Kaczyński, 2008

Shimon Peres is the author of 11 books, including:

- The Next Step (1965)
- David's Sling (1970) (ISBN 978-0-297-00083-9)
- And Now Tomorrow (1978)
- From These Men: seven founders of the State of Israel (1979) (ISBN 978-0-671-61016-6)
- Entebbe Diary (1991) (ISBN 978-965-248-111-5)
- The New Middle East (1993) (ISBN 978-0-8050-3323-6)
- Battling for Peace: A Memoir (1995) (ISBN 978-0-679-43617-1)
- For the Future of Israel (1998) (ISBN 978-0-8018-5928-1)
- The Imaginary Voyage: With Theodor Herzl in Israel (1999) (ISBN 978-1-55970-468-7)
- Ben Gurion: A Political Life (2011) (ISBN 978-0-8052-4282-9)

== Awards and recognition ==
- 1957: Commander of the Legion of Honour.
- 1994, 10 December: Nobel Peace Prize together with Yitzhak Rabin and Yasser Arafat.
- 2008, 18 November: Honorary doctorate of law from King's College London.
- 2008, 20 November: Honorarily appointed Knight Grand Cross of the Order of St Michael and St George.
- 2012, 13 June: Presidential Medal of Freedom from US President Barack Obama.
- 2014, 19 May: The United States House of Representatives voted on H.R. 2939, a bill to award Peres the Congressional Gold Medal. The bill said that "Congress proclaims its unbreakable bond with Israel."
- 2015, 31 May: The Solomon Bublick Award of the Hebrew University of Jerusalem, in recognition of his contributions to the State of Israel, the pursuit of peace, higher education, and science and technology.

== Overview of offices held ==
Peres twice officially served as prime minister (Israel's head of government). His first stint spanned from 13 September 1984 through 20 October 1986, leading the 21st government during the first half of the 11th Knesset. His second stint lasted from 4 November 1995 through 18 June 1996 (serving in an acting capacity from 4 November through 22 November 1995; and in permanent capacity thereafter), leading the 25th government as interim prime minister and the 26th government as permanent prime minister during the latter portion of the 13th Knesset. In addition to these two official stints as prime minister, Peres is also considered to have served as the de facto acting prime minister from 22 April through 21 June 1977 (with Yitzhak Rabin remaining the de jure prime minister). Peres served as president (Israel's head of state) from 15 July 2007 through 24 July 2014. Peres was a member of the Knesset (Israel's legislature), first from November 1959 through 15 January 2006 (a record 47-year tenure), and again from March 2006 through 13 June 2007. His overall Knesset tenure of 48 years is the longest tenure in the history of the Knesset.

Peres, four times, served as the leader of the Knesset's opposition. For his first three stints in this role, the opposition leader was an unofficial and honorary role. His final stint in the position came after Knesset formalized the role as an official position. Peres was the unofficial opposition leader from 20 June 1977 through 13 September 1984, during the entirety of the 9th and 10th Knessets. During this stint, he led the opposition to the Menachem Begin-led 18th and 19th governments and the Yitzhak Shamir-led 20th government of Israel. His second stint as opposition lasted from 15 March 1990 through 13 July 1992, when in lead the opposition to the Yitzhak Shamir-led 24th government during a portion of the 12th Knesset. Peres' third stint lasted from 18 June 1996 to 1 July 1997, and saw him lead the opposition to the Benjamin Netanyahu-led 24th government during a portion of the 14th Knesset. Peres' final stint as opposition leader lasted from 25 June 2003 through 10 January 2005, and saw him lead the opposition to the Ariel Sharon-led 30th government during a portion of the sixteenth Knesset.

=== Labor Party leadership ===
Peres thrice served as leader of the Israeli Labor Party.

Tenures as Labor Party leader
Tenure	Predecessor	Successor	Knesset elections as leader	Elected/reelected as leader
December 1977–February 1992	Yitzhak Rabin	Yitzhak Rabin	1977; 1981; 1984; 1988	1977 (Apr), 1980, 1984
November 1995–June 1997	Yitzhak Rabin	Ehud Barak	1996	1995
June 2003–November 2005 (interim leader)	Amram Mitzna	Amir Peretz		2003

=== Ministerial posts ===
Peres held numerous ministerial posts over the course of his Knesset tenure. He held major ministerial posts in twelve governments.

Ministerial posts
Ministerial post	Tenure	Prime Minister(s)	Government(s)	Predecessor	Successor
Deputy Minister of Defense	21 December 1959 – 25 May 1965	David Ben-Gurion (until 26 June 1963); Levi Eshkol (after 26 June 1963)	9, 10 11, 12	office established	Zvi Dinstein
Minister without Portfolio	15 December 1969 – 22 December 1969	Golda Meir	15	—N/a	
Minister of Immigrant Absorption	22 December 1969 – 27 July 1970	Golda Meir	15	Yigal Allon	Natan Peled
Minister of Communications	1 September 1970 – 10 March 1974	Golda Meir	15	Elimelekh Rimalt	Aharon Uzan
Minister of transportation	1 September 1970 – 10 March 1974	Golda Meir	15	Ezer Weizman	Aharon Yariv
Minister of information	10 March 1974 – 3 June 1974	Golda Meir	16	office established	Aharon Yariv
Minister of defense (first tenure)	3 June 1974 – 20 June 1977	Yitzhak Rabin	17	Moshe Dayan	Ezer Weizman
Minister of internal affairs	13 September 1984 – 24 December 1984	Shimon Peres	21	Yosef Burg	Yitzhak Peretz
Minister of religious affairs	13 September 1984 – 23 December 1984	Shimon Peres	21	Yosef Burg	Yosef Burg⋅
Designated acting prime minister	20 October 1986 – 15 March 1990	Yitzhak Shamir	22, 23	Yitzhak Shamir	Ehud Olmert (2003)
Minister of foreign affairs (first tenure)	20 October 1986 – 23 December 1988	Yitzhak Shamir	22	Yitzhak Shamir	Moshe Arens
Minister of finance	22 December 1988 – 15 March 1990	Yitzhak Shamir	23	Moshe Nissim	Yitzhak Shamir
Minister of foreign affairs (second tenure)	14 July 1992 – 22 November 1995	Yitzhak Rabin (until 4 November 1995); Shimon Peres (interim after 4 November 1995)	25	David Levy	Ehud Barak
Minister of defense (second tenure)	4 November 1995 – 22 November 1995 (interim minister); 22 November 1995 – 18 June 1996 (permanent minister)	Shimon Peres (interim PM until 22 November 1995 and permanent PM afterwards)	25, 26	Yitzhak Rabin	Yitzhak Mordechai
Minister of Regional Cooperation	6 July 1999 – 7 March 2001	Ehud Barak	28	office established	Tzipi Livni
Deputy prime minister (serving alongside Silvan Shalom, Natan Sharansky, and Eli Yishai)	7 March 2001 – 2 November 2002	Ariel Sharon	29	Binyamin Ben-Eliezer	
Minister of foreign affairs (third tenure)	7 March 2001 – 2 October 2002	Ariel Sharon	29	Shlomo Ben-Ami	Ariel Sharon
Vice prime minister (first tenure)	10 January 2005 – 23 November 2005	Ariel Sharon	30	office established	
Vice prime minister (second tenure)	10 January 2006 – 13 June 2007	Ehud Olmert	31		Haim Ramon
Minister for the development of the Negev, Galilee and regional economy	10 January 2006 – 13 June 2007	Ehud Olmert	31	office established	Yaakov Edri

=== Other offices ===
From 1952 through 1953, Peres was the deputy director general of the Israeli Ministry of Defense. From 1952 through 1959, he was the director general.

Peres served as vice president of Socialist International. He was elected vice president in 1978.

=== Timeline of Knesset tenure ===
Timeline
Period	Party affiliation	Status of party	Position	Prime minister(s) at time
Nov. 1959 – Dec. 1959	Mapai	Government	Deputy minister	David Ben-Gurion (Mapai), 9th gov. (1959–1961); Levi Eshkol (Mapai), 10th, 11th, 12th govs. (1961–1965)
Nov. 1965 – 1969	Rafi	Opposition	—N/a	Levi Eshkol (Labor), 13th gov. (1966–1969); Yigal Allon (Labor) 13th gov (acting 1969); Golda Meir (Labor), 14th gov (1969)
Dec. 1969 – Apr. 1977	Labor	Government	Minister	Golda Meier (Labor), 15th and 16th govs. (1969–1977); Yitzhak Rabin (Labor), 17th gov. (1974–1977)
Apr. 1969 – Jun. 1977	Labor (party leader)	Government	Acting prime minister (unofficial)	himself (unofficial acting) and Yitzhak Rabin (Likud) (official) 17th gov.
Apr. 1969 – Jun. 1977	Labor (party leader)	Opposition	Opposition leader (unofficial)	Menachem Begin (Likud); 18th and 19th govs.
Sep. 1984 – Oct. 1986	Labor (party leader)	Government	Prime minister	himself (Labor), 21st gov.
Oct. 1986 – Mar. 1990	Labor (party leader)	Government	Minister	Yitzhak Shamir (Likud), 22nd and 23rd govs.
Mar. 1990 – Feb. 1992	Labor (party leader)	Opposition	Opposition leader (unofficial)	Yitzhak Shamir (Likud), 23rd gov.
Feb. 1992 – Jun. 1992	Labor	Opposition	—N/a	Yitzhak Shamir (Likud), 23rd gov.
Jul. 1992 – Nov. 1995	Labor	Government	Minister	Shimon Peres (Labor), 25th gov.
Nov. 1995	Labor	Government	Acting prime minister	himself (acting) (Labor), 25th gov.
Nov. 1995 – Jun. 1996	Labor (party leader)	Government	Prime minister	himself (Labor), 26th gov.
Jun. 1996 – Jun. 1997	Labor (party leader)	Opposition	Opposition leader (unofficial)	Benjamin Netanyahu (Likud), 27th gov.
Jun. 1997 – Jul. 1999	Labor	Opposition	—N/a	Benjamin Netanyahu (Likud), 27th gov.
Jul. 1999 – Mar. 2001	Labor	Government	Minister	Ehud Barak (Labor), 28th gov.
Mar. 2001 – Nov. 2002	Labor	Government	Minister	Ariel Sharon (Likud), 29th gov.
Nov. 2002 – Jun. 2003	Labor	Opposition	—N/a	Ariel Sharon (Likud), 29th and 30th govs.
Jun. 2003 – Jan. 2005	Labor (acting party leader)	Opposition	Opposition leader	Ariel Sharon (Likud), 30th gov.
Jan. 2005 – Nov. 2005	Labor (acting party leader)	Government	Minister	Ariel Sharon (Likud), 30th gov.
May 2006 – Jun. 2007	Kadima	Government	Minister	Ehud Olmert (Likud), 31st gov.

== Electoral history ==
=== 1996 direct election for Prime Minister ===
1996 Israeli prime ministerial election
Party	Candidate	Votes	%
Likud	Benjamin Netanyahu	1,501,023	50.50
Labor	Shimon Peres (incumbent)	1,471,566	49.50
Total votes		2,972,589	100

=== Presidential elections ===
2000 Israeli presidential election
Party	Candidate	First round		Second round	
Party	Candidate	Votes	%	Votes	%
Likud	Moshe Katsav	60	50	63	52.5
One Israel	Shimon Peres	57	47.5	57	47.5
	Abstaining	3	2.5		
Total		120	100	120	100

2007 Israeli presidential election
Party	Candidate	First round		Second round	
Party	Candidate	Votes	%	Votes	%
Kadima	Shimon Peres	58	52.73	86	78.90
Likud	Reuven Rivlin	31	28.18		
Labor	Colette Avital	21	19.09		
	Against			23	19.10
Total		110	100	109	100

=== Party leadership elections ===
1974 Israeli Labor Party leadership election
Candidate	Votes	%
Yitzhak Rabin	298	53.99
Shimon Peres	254	46.02
Total votes	552	100

February 1977 Israeli Labor Party leadership election
Candidate	Votes	%
Yitzhak Rabin (incumbent)	1,445	50.72
Shimon Peres	1,404	49.28
Total votes	1,997	100

April 1977 Israeli Labor Party leadership election
Candidate	Votes	%
Shimon Peres	unchallenged (acclamation)	100

1980 Israeli Labor Party leadership election
Candidate	Votes	%
Shimon Peres (incumbent)	2,123	70.81
Yitzhak Rabin	875	29.19
Total votes	2,998	100

1984 Israeli Labor Party leadership election
Candidate	Votes	%
Shimon Peres (incumbent)	unchallenged	100

1992 Israeli Labor Party leadership election
Candidate	Votes	%
Yizhak Rabin		40.6
Shimon Peres (incumbent)		34.5
Yisrael Kessar		19.0
Ora Namir		5.5
Total votes	108,347	100
Turnout		70.10%

2003 Israeli Labor Party interim leader election
Candidate	Votes	%
Shimon Peres	631	49.14
Efraim Sneh	359	27.96
Danny Atar	281	21.89
Abstaining	11	1.01
Total votes	1,284	100
Turnout	1,284	52%

2005 Israeli Labor Party leadership election
Candidate	Votes	%
Amir Peretz	27,098	42.2
Shimon Peres (interim inccumbent)	25,572	39.82
Binyamin Ben-Eliezer	10,764	16.76
Turnout	64,204	63.88%

== See also ==
- List of Israeli Nobel laureates
- List of Jewish Nobel laureates

== Notes ==
Party political offices
Preceded by Yitzhak Rabin	Leader of the Alignment; 1977–1992	Succeeded by Yitzhak Rabin
Preceded by Yitzhak Rabin	Leader of the Labor Party; 1995–1996	Succeeded by Ehud Barak
Preceded by Amram Mitzna	Leader of the Labor Party; 2003–2005	Succeeded by Amir Peretz
Political offices
Preceded by Yitzhak Rabin	Prime Minister of Israel; Acting; 1977	Succeeded by Menachem Begin
Preceded by Yitzhak Shamir	Prime Minister of Israel; 1984–1986	Succeeded by Yitzhak Shamir
Preceded by Yitzhak Rabin	Prime Minister of Israel; 1995–1996	Succeeded by Benjamin Netanyahu
Preceded by Moshe Katsav	President of Israel; 2007–2014	Succeeded by Reuven Rivlin
