= 1995 Israeli Labor Party leadership election =

Israeli Labor Party leadership election

- 14 November 1995

vote by Central Committee of party
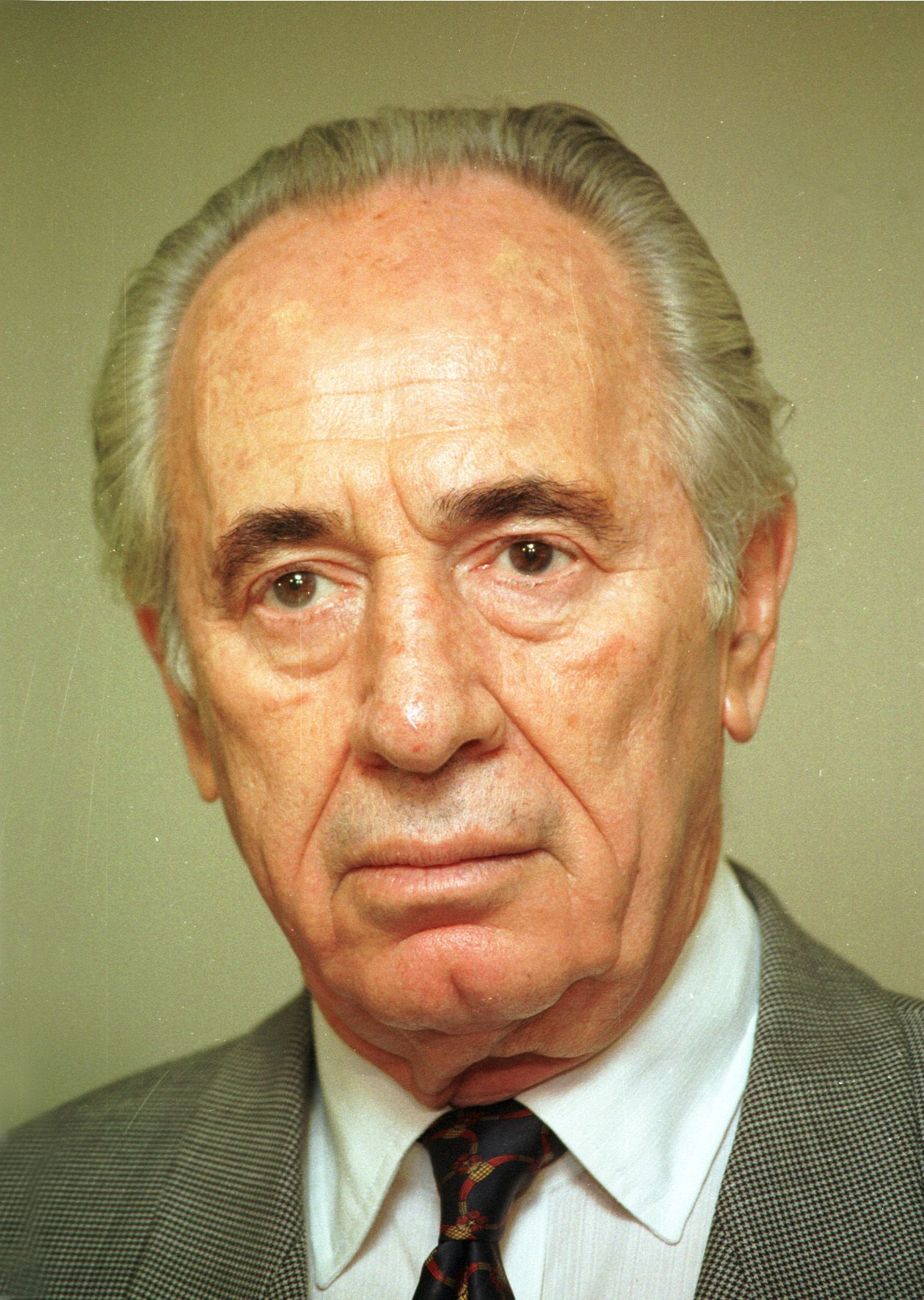
Candidate	Shimon Peres
Leader before election
Vacant
(most recently Yitzhak Rabin)
Elected Leader
Shimon Peres

The 1995 Israeli Labor Party leadership election was held on 15 November 1995. It saw the party's Central Committee formally vote to make Shimon Peres the party's leader.

The election took place after the 4 November 1995 assassination of party leader and Prime Minister of Israel Yitzhak Rabin. After the assassination, Peres had been named the acting prime minister of a provisional government. However, making Peres the leader of the Labor Party was considered a formality that needed to be completed before President Ezer Weizman could invite Peres form a new government.

Due to the extraordinary circumstances, the election was limited to a vote of the membership the party's Central Committee, rather than being open to the party's general membership like the preceding 1992 leadership election and all subsequent Israeli Labor Party leadership elections (with the exception of the 2003 election of an interim party leader).

The day after the leadership election, Peres was invited by President Weizman to form a new government. On 21 November 1995, Peres signed a coalition agreement between Labor, Meretz and Yiud (which had been members of Rabin's government), which was formally approved by the Knesset the next day, establishing a new government with Peres as prime minister.
