= 1984 Israeli Labor Party leadership election =

Israeli Labor Party leadership election

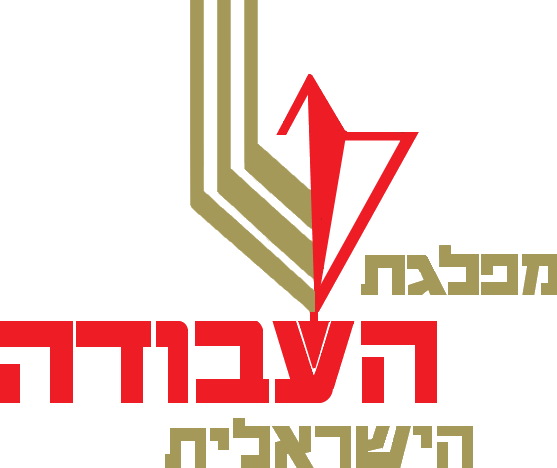
- April 1984
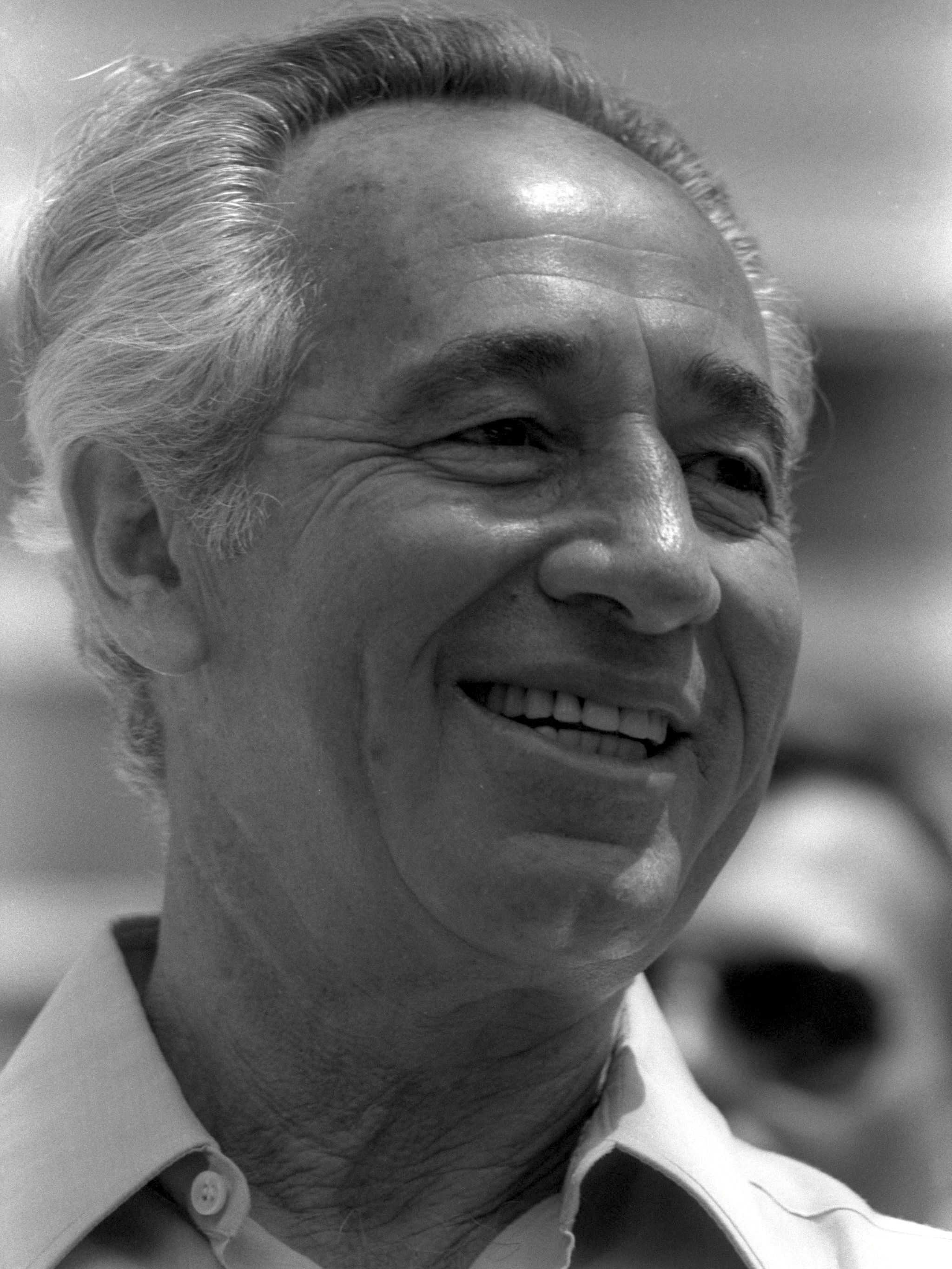
Candidate	Shimon Peres
Percentage	Unchallenged
Leader before election
Shimon Peres
Elected Leader
Shimon Peres

The 1984 Israeli Labor Party leadership election was held in April 1984. It saw Shimon Peres reelected as the party's leader, being unchallenged.

The vote took place in advance of the 1984 Knesset election.

After prospective challengers Yitzhak Rabin and Yitzhak Navon each announced on July 30, 1984, that they had decided against challenging Peres for leadership, Peres was left to be unanimously reelected without an opponent. At the time, polls showed Navon to be the nation's most popular politician, while Peres was shown by polls to be very unpopular, a dynamic which had been one reasons a challenge by Navon was contemplated.
