= April 1977 Israeli Labor Party leadership election =

Israeli Labor Party leadership election

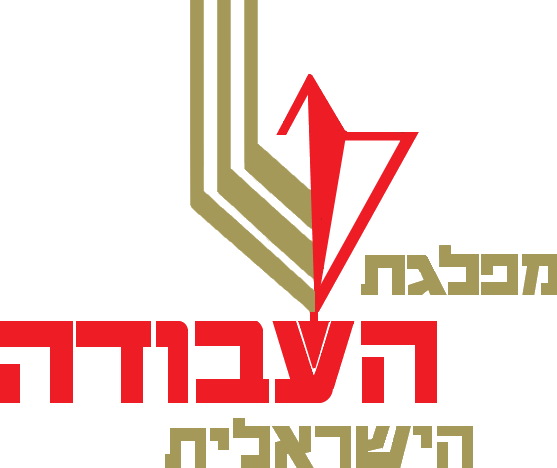
- 11 April 1977

vote by Central Committee of party
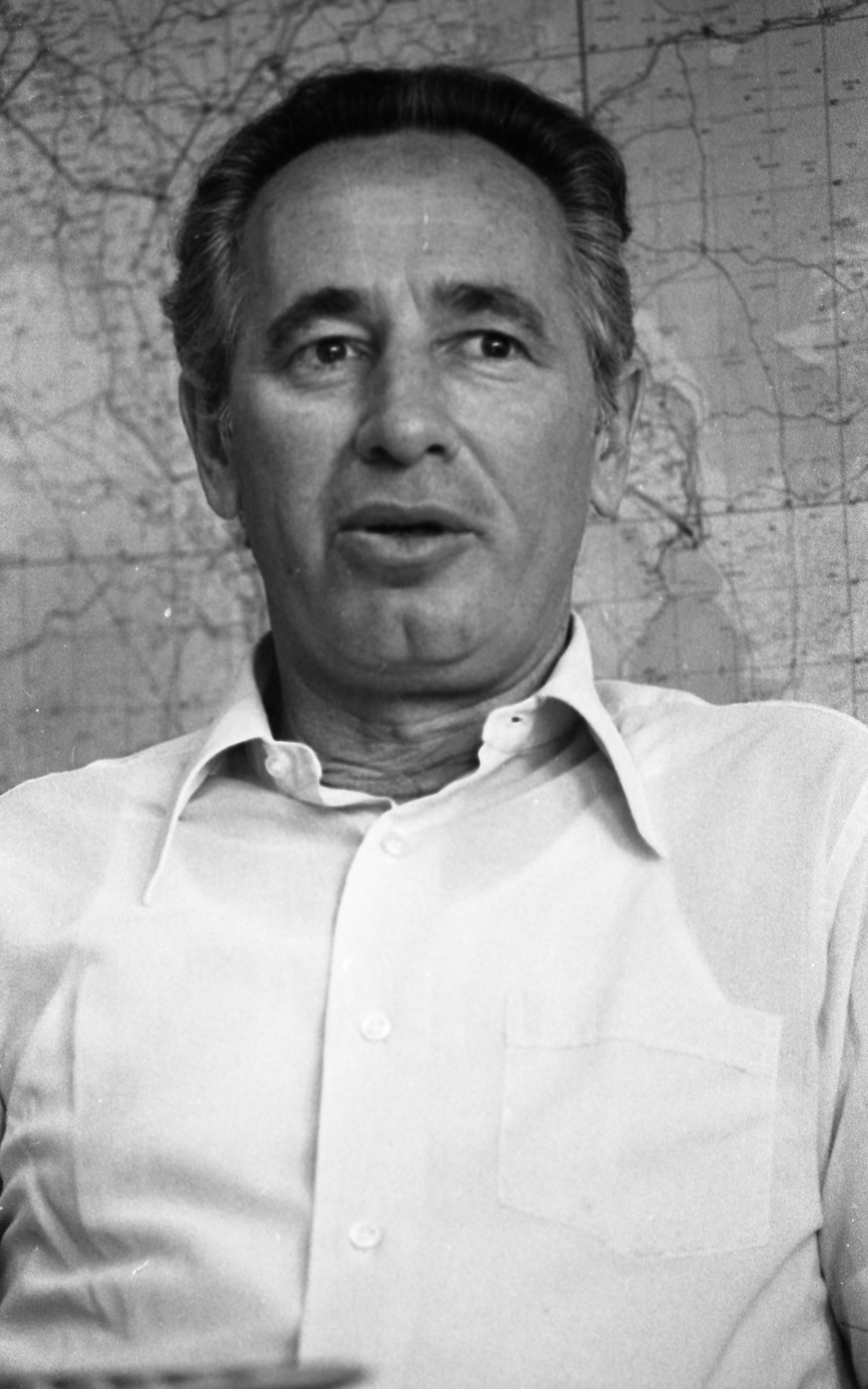
Candidate	Shimon Peres
Percentage	Unchallenged (acclamation)
Leader before election
Yitzhak Rabin
Elected Leader
Shimon Peres

The April 1977 Israeli Labor Party leadership election was held on 11 April 1977. It saw Defense Minister Shimon Peres elected by the party's central committee by acclamation to replace Yitzhak Rabin as the party's leader, being unchallenged in the vote.

The vote took place following the resignation of Rabin on 7 April 1977, and in advance of the 1977 Knesset election. Since it was only months since the February 1977 leadership election had taken place by a convention vote, the party opted against holding another convention vote, and instead opted for a vote of its 815-member Central Committee.

Foreign Minister Yigal Allon, who had been Peres' only challenger, stepped aside in deference to Peres, with the promise that he would receive the ministerial position of his choice if Labor led the government formed after the pending Knesset election (Allon had made it known he desired to become defense minister). After this, following hours of discussion, the party's leadership announced on 10 April 1977 their endorsement of Peres as the party's new leader. Peres was formally elected on 11 April by acclamation, using a show of hands.
