= Efraim Sneh =

Israeli politician (born 1944)

Ephraim Sneh
- אפרים סנה
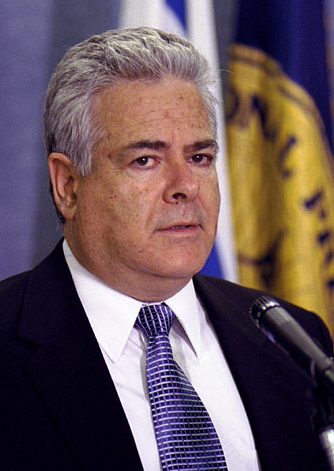

Ministerial roles
- 1994–1996: Minister of Health
- 2001–2002: Minister of Transportation

Faction represented in the Knesset
- 1992–1999: Labor Party
- 1999–2001: One Israel
- 2001–2008: Labor Party

Personal details
- Born: 19 September 1944 (age 82) Tel Aviv, Mandatory Palestine

Ephraim Sneh (Hebrew: אפרים סנה, romanized: Efraim Sneh, born 19 September 1944) is an Israeli politician, physician, and a retired brigadier general in the Israel Defense Forces. He was a member of the Knesset for the Labor Party between 1992 and 2008 and served in several ministerial posts. He headed the Yisrael Hazaka party, which he established in May 2008 but failed to pass the electoral threshold in the 2009 Israeli legislative election and has been inactive since then.

== Life and career ==
Born in Tel Aviv in 1944, Sneh is the son of Moshe Sneh, who was one of the heads of the Haganah. His father was elected to the first Knesset as a representative of Mapam, before defecting to Maki, the Israeli Communist Party.

Sneh attended Ironi Aleph high school in Tel Aviv. Sneh served in the Nahal infantry battalion from 1962 to 1964. He studied medicine at Tel Aviv University and specialized in internal medicine. Once he finished his studies he returned to military service as a battalion doctor, then as a brigade doctor for the Paratroopers Brigade. In the Yom Kippur War, he commanded a medical unit of the brigade in the Battle of The Chinese Farm and battles west of the Suez Canal. Sneh also commanded the medical unit at Operation Entebbe, and Yonatan Netanyahu died in his arms. Afterwards, he served as commander of the elite Unit 669 and as commander of the security zone in southern Lebanon. His last role in the IDF was as head of the civilian administration of the West Bank.

In December 1987, with his release from the army, he joined the Labor Party. From 1988 to 1994 he served on many delegations, specifically dealing with the Palestinian leadership. In 1992, Sneh was elected to the Knesset, serving as Minister of Health from 1994 to 1996. In 1999, he was appointed deputy minister of defense, and in 2001 he was appointed Minister of Transportation. Sneh ran for the interim leadership of the Labor Party in 2003, winning 28% of the vote.

Sneh stood out in his objection to the withdrawal from southern Lebanon, though he eventually accepted it following Prime Minister Ehud Barak's decision. Generally, Sneh is considered a "hawk" in the Labor Party. He has repeatedly expressed concern over Iran's Nuclear Program, In 2006, Iran filed a complaint to the UN Security Council over his remarks that Israel must be ready to prevent Iran's nuclear program "at all costs."

In the negotiations leading to the formation of the 31st Government under Prime Minister Ehud Olmert, there was extensive speculation that Sneh would be appointed Deputy Minister of Defense. Although not initially appointed to a position in the government, Sneh was appointed Deputy Minister of Defense on 30 October 2006. He served under Defense Minister Amir Peretz, who also was the Labor Party leader. The replacement of Peretz by Barak as both party leader and Defense Minister in the summer of 2007 also led to a change in the deputy position; Sneh left office on 18 June 2007 and was replaced by Matan Vilnai.

On 25 May 2008, Sneh announced that he would be leaving the Labor Party and creating a new party, Yisrael Hazaka. He left the Knesset on 28 May and was replaced by Shakhiv Shana'an.

In 2014, in an interview with Al-Monitor, Sneh said the Israeli public has been "brainwashed" in recent years into believing there is no Palestinian peace partner by what he described as a "well-oiled propaganda system of the Israeli regime" which he characterized as "anti-Palestinian" and "Goebbelsian". In 2026, Sneh called Israeli settler violence in the West Bank "ethnic cleansing" of Palestinians.

He lives in Herzliya, and is married with two children.
