= 2002 Israeli Labor Party leadership election =

Israeli Labor Party leadership election

- 20 November 2002

vote by general membership of party
- Turnout: 59.5%
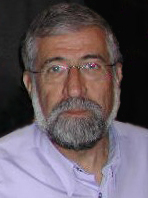

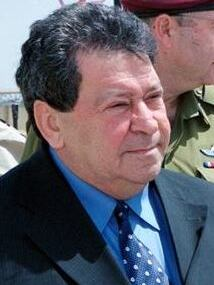

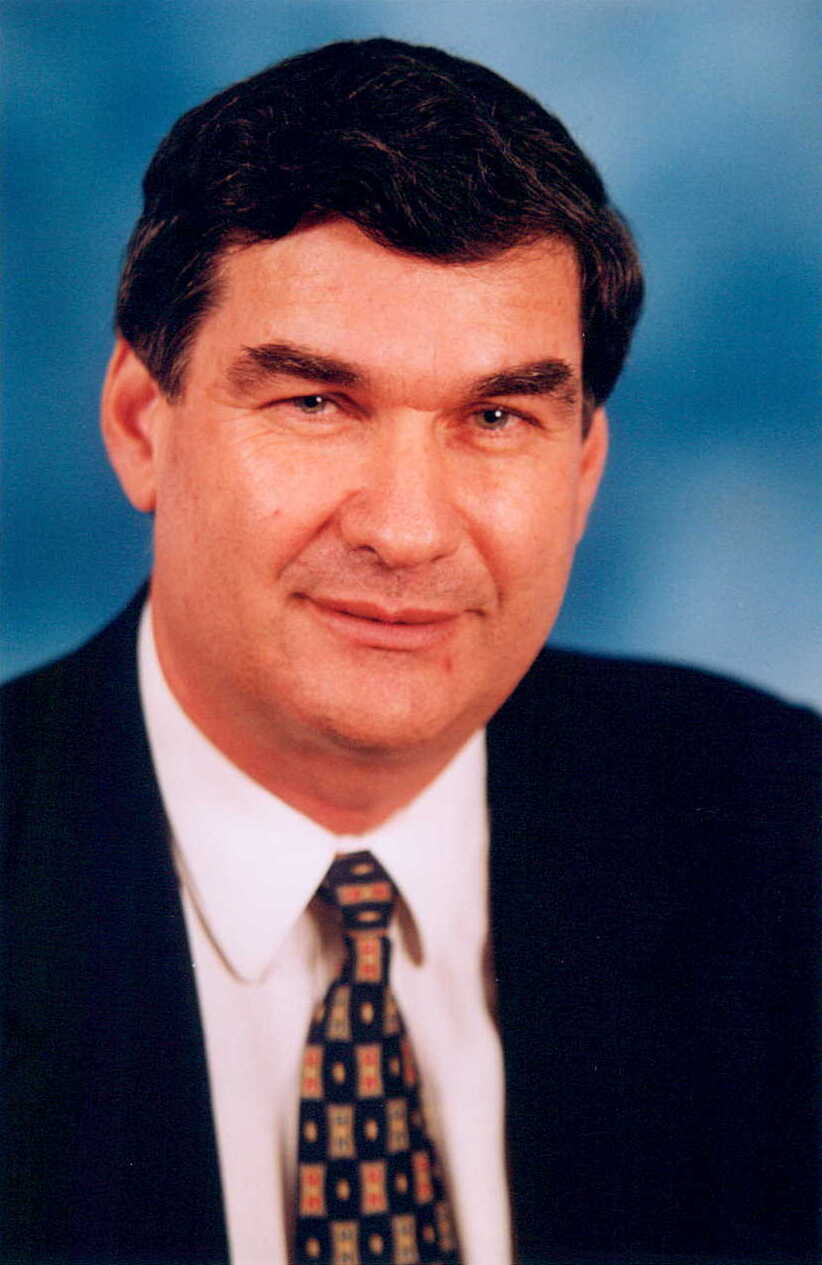
Candidate	Amram Mitzna	Binyamin Ben-Eliezer	Haim Ramon
Party	Labor	Labor	Labor
Popular vote	35,945	25,445	4,830
Percentage	53.91%	38.16%	7.24%
Leader before election
Binyamin Ben-Eliezer
Elected Leader
Amram Mitzna

A leadership election was held by the Israeli Labor Party on 19 November 2002. Mayor of Haifa Amram Mitzna defeated incumbent Leader Binyamin Ben-Eliezer and Member of the Knesset Haim Ramon.

== Background ==
In 2001, special elections for the position of prime minister took place after the resignation of Ehud Barak. Barak, then the leader of the Labor party, lost to Ariel Sharon. The Labor Party joined Sharon's new party, with Barak subsequently retiring from political life. Following his resignation, Barak was replaced as party leader by Binyamin Ben-Eliezer, who defeated Speaker of the Knesset Avraham Burg in a leadership election in December 2001. Due to tensions regarding the leadership election, it was decided that a second leadership election would be held in 2002. In May 2002, Eitan Cabel stated that Member of the Knesset Haim Ramon would run for the party's leadership, with Cabel serving as Ramon's campaign manager. In July, Ben-Eliezer and Ramon agreed to hold the election on 19 November.

On 1 August, Haifa Mayor Amram Mitzna stated that he was considering running for the leadership of the Labor Party. Several politicians, including Minister of Science, Culture and Sport Matan Vilnai, Mayor of Tel Aviv Ron Huldai, and Member of the Knesset Yossi Katz, endorsed the idea. Mitzna formally announced his candidacy on 13 August.

On 5 November 2002, following Labor's withdrawal from the government, the Knesset was dissolved, and new elections were called for January 2003. On 12 November, Mitzna, Ben-Eliezer and Ramon participated in a televised debate on Channel 2.

== Campaign ==
Mitzna campaigned on a solution to the Israeli–Palestinian conflict. He stated that Israel should negotiate a permanent settlement with the Palestinians, which would include the evacuation of Israeli outposts.

Ramon criticized Mitzna for advocating negotiations with Palestinian authorities, arguing that Israel should unilaterally withdraw from both the Gaza Strip and the West Bank. He also criticized Ben-Eliezer's plan to construct a Separation barrier in the West Bank, believing that Israel should withdraw before a barrier is built. Ramon also criticized Ben-Eliezer for participating in Sharon's Government.

== Candidates ==
- Amram Mitzna - Mayor of Haifa.
- Binyamin Ben-Eliezer - Incumbent leader of the Labor Party and Minister of Defense (until 2 November 2002).
- Haim Ramon - Member of the Knesset and former Minister of Health.

== Results ==
Candidate	Party	Votes	%
Amram Mitzna	Labor	35,945	54.28
Binyamin Ben-Eliezer	Labor	25,445	38.42
Haim Ramon	Labor	4,830	7.29
Total		66,220	100.00
Valid votes		66,220	99.08
Invalid/blank votes		617	0.92
Total votes		66,837	100.00
Registered voters/turnout			59.5%
Source: Israeli Labor Party, Archived via the Internet Archive, ynet

== Aftermath ==
Both Ben-Eliezer and Ramon coneded defeat after initial results showed a Mitzna victory. Ben-Eliezer was assigned the second spot on the party's list for the 2003 election, where the party won 19 seats, then an all-time low. After the election, Mitzna announced his resignation from the party leadership in May 2005, and was replaced by Shimon Peres, who became the interim leader until the next leadership election took place.
