= 2005 Israeli Labor Party leadership election =

Israeli Labor Party leadership election

- 9 November 2005

vote by general membership of party
- Turnout: 63.88%
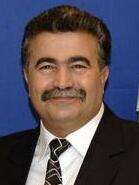

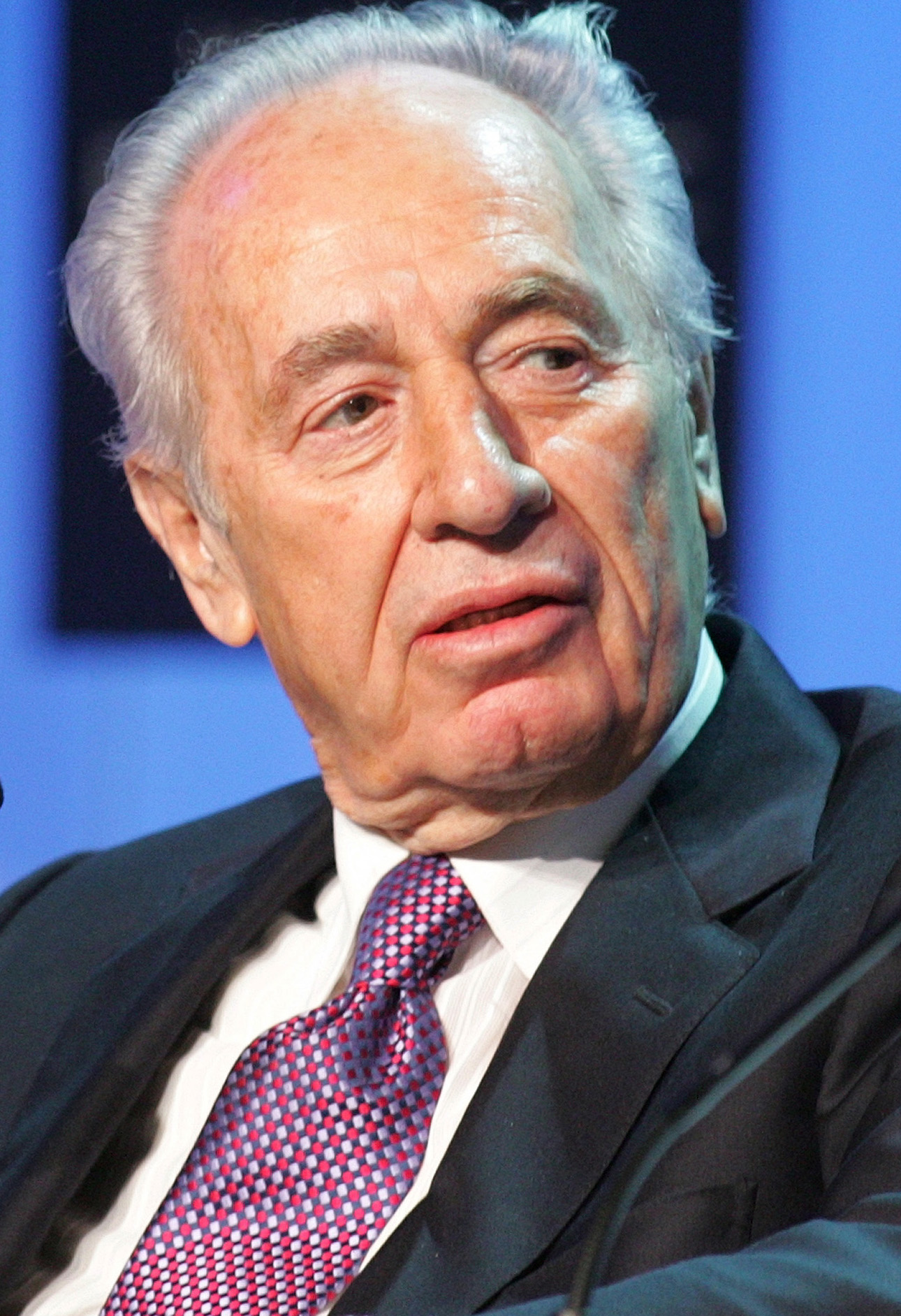

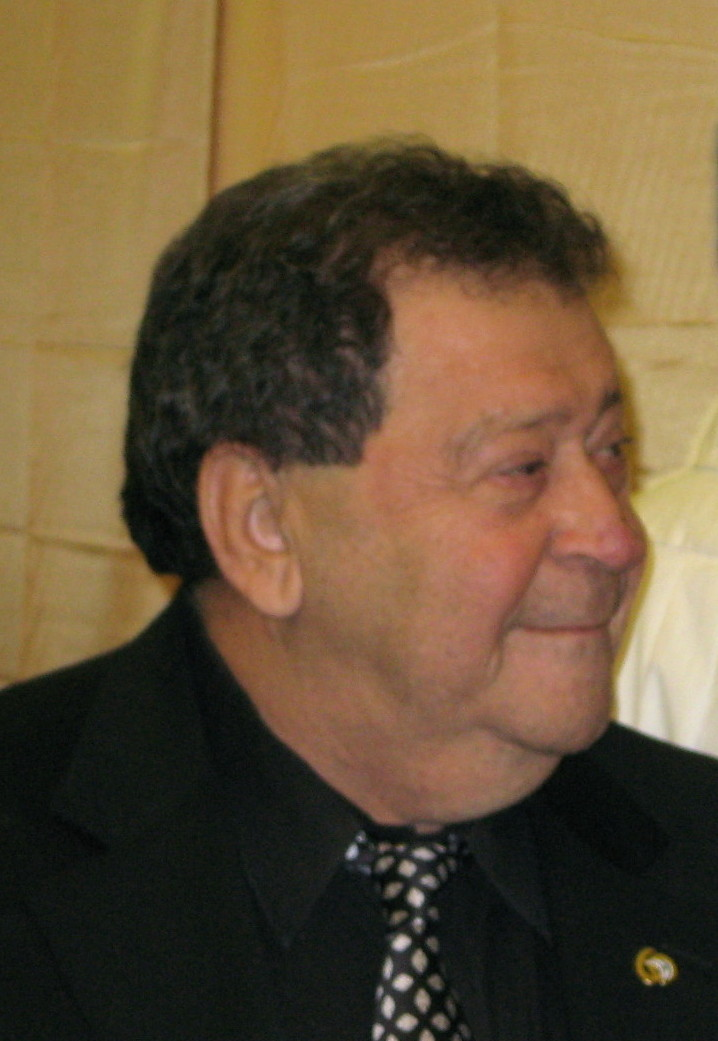
Candidate	Amir Peretz	Shimon Peres	Binyamin Ben-Eliezer
Party	Labor	Labor	Labor
Popular vote	27,098	25,572	10,764
Percentage	42.2%	39.82%	16.76%
Leader before election
Shimon Peres (interim)
Elected Leader
Amir Peretz

A leadership election was held by the Israeli Labor Party on 9 November 2005. Chairman of the Histadrut Trade union Amir Peretz defeated Deputy Prime Minister and incumbent leader of the party Shimon Peres.

== Background ==
In 2001, special elections for the position of prime minister took place after the resignation of Ehud Barak. Barak, then the leader of the Labor party, lost to Ariel Sharon, and subsequently retired from political life. he was replaced by Binyamin Ben-Eliezer, who was subsequently defeated by Amram Mitzna in 2002. Mitzna resigned the next year due to the party's poor performance in the 2003 election. as a result of Mitzna's resignation, the decision was made to appoint party veteran Shimon Peres as interim leader in June 2003, with the intent that he would serve for one year.

In July 2003, members of the Labor Party began talks regarding precise primary dates. Binyamin Ben-Eliezer and his allies wanted to establish a committee to prepare for internal elections, to be held in June 2004, which the party's internal bureau rejected. In September, Peres began negotiations with the One Nation party, led by Amir Peretz, with the hopes of fielding a joint list in the next election. in November, several members of the party, including Dalia Itzik and Avraham Burg, proposed the extension of Peres's term by at least one year. Ben-Eliezer initially opposed both motions, and accused Peres of selling out the party, but reached an agreement with Peres to lengthen his term by a year in February 2004. Labor reached an agreement with One Nation in May 2004, despite Ben-Eliezer's opposition. the two parties later merged in 2005.

In December 2004, the party's central committee scheduled the upcoming primary for June 2005. Peretz announced his intention to run on 12 June. the following month, Labor joined the government of Ariel Sharon. with Peres becoming the Vice Prime Minister. on 26 June 2005, two days before the scheduled primary date, the primary was delayed following the discovery of potential fraud in a recently conducted party census. following the postponement, Barak dropped out of the race and endorsed Peres on 11 September. Member of the Knesset Matan Vilnai announced his intention to run on 10 October. on 16 October, the Central Committee set the primary date on 9 November. Vilnai dropped out of the race on 6 November after Peres promised to appoint him Minister of Defense in a labor-led government.

== Campaign ==
Peretz campaigned on a desire to return labor to its socialist roots, opposing free market reforms and budgetary cuts which he argued hurt Israel's poor. In addition, he campaigned for his party's withdrawal from the government at the time.

Peres campaigned on his political experience, portraying himself as a calm and civil candidate.

Before dropping out on 11 September, Barak campaigned against the government of the time. He argued that it was incapable of protecting citizens and vowed to back law enforcement if elected. Barak received endorsements from former leader Amram Mitzna, members of the Knesset Avraham Shochat and Danny Yatom, and Minister of Environmental Protection Shalom Simhon.

== Candidates ==
- Shimon Peres - former Prime Minister, incumbent leader of the Labor Party, Vice Prime Minister.
- Amir Peretz - chairman of the Histadrut, Member of the Knesset, former leader of the One Nation party.
- Binyamin Ben-Eliezer - Minister of National Infrastructure, former Minister of Defense, former leader of the Labor Party.

=== Withdrawn ===
- Matan Vilnai - Member of the Knesset.
- Ehud Barak - former Prime Minister.

== Polls ==
=== First round ===
==== 2003 ====
Date	Poll source	Shimon Peres	Ehud Barak	Matan Vilnai	Avraham Burg	Binyamin Ben-Eliezer	Avraham Shochat	Other/Undecided
7 August 2003	Shvakim Panorama (for Kol Yisrael)	17.6%	28.4%	20%	22.1%	2.9%	1%	8.1%
7 August 2003	Shvakim Panorama (for Kol Yisrael)	–	39.8%	20%	22.1%	6.2%	1.9%	10%
3 September 2003	Shvakim Panorama (for Kol Yisrael)	–	33.4%	22.2%	24.6%	4%	0%	15.8%

==== 2004 ====
Date	Poll source	Shimon Peres	Ehud Barak	Matan Vilnai	Ami Ayalon	Binyamin Ben-Eliezer	Haim Ramon	Amir Peretz	Dalia Itzik	Other/Undecided
27 August 2004	Teleseker (for Maariv)	25%	16%	17%	19%	7%	–	–	–	–
19-20 September 2004	Dahaf (for Yedioth Ahronoth)	32%	17%	15%	–	6%	7%	7%	1%	15%

==== 2005 ====
Date	Poll source	Shimon Peres	Amir Peretz	Ehud Barak	Matan Vilnai	Binyamin Ben-Eliezer	Other/Undecided
16 June 2005	Shvakim Panorama (for Kol Yisrael)	27.31%	24.32%	14.53%	15.23%	18.61%	–
16 June 2005	Dialog (for Haaretz)	26%	24%	14%	13%	10%	–
17 June 2005	Dahaf (for Yedioth Ahronoth)	29%	23%	17%	13%	10%	–
14 October 2005	Dahaf (for Yedioth Ahronoth)	40%	23%	–	16%	11%	–

=== Second round ===
==== 2003 ====
Date	Poll source	Shimon Peres	Ehud Barak	Matan Vilnai	Avraham Burg	Binyamin Ben-Eliezer	Amir Peretz	Other/Undecided
3 September 2003	Shvakim Panorama (for Kol Yisrael)	–	40.4%	38.6%	–	–	–	21%
3 September 2003	Shvakim Panorama (for Kol Yisrael)	–	34.4%	–	33.7%	–	–	31.9%

==== 2004 ====
Date	Poll source	Shimon Peres	Ehud Barak	Matan Vilnai	Binyamin Ben-Eliezer	Amir Peretz	Avraham Burg	Other/Undecided
27 August 2004	Teleseker (for Maariv)	55%	35%	–	–	–	–	–
19-20 September 2004	Dahaf (for Yedioth Ahronoth)	52%	35%	–	–	–	–	–
19-20 September 2004	Dahaf (for Yedioth Ahronoth)	51%	–	34%	–	–	–	–
19-20 September 2004	Dahaf (for Yedioth Ahronoth)	68%	–	–	16%	–	–	–
19-20 September 2004	Dahaf (for Yedioth Ahronoth)	68%	–	–	–	18%	–	–

==== 2005 ====
Date	Poll source	Shimon Peres	Amir Peretz	Ehud Barak	Matan Vilnai	Binyamin Ben-Eliezer	Other/Undecided
17 June 2005	Dahaf (for Yedioth Ahronoth)	43%	33%	–	–	–	–
17 June 2005	Dahaf (for Yedioth Ahronoth)	55%	–	29%	–	–	–
17 June 2005	Dahaf (for Yedioth Ahronoth)	43%	–	–	38%	–	–
17 June 2005	Dahaf (for Yedioth Ahronoth)	55%	–	–	–	20%	–

== Results ==
2005 Israeli Labor Party leadership election
Party	Candidate	Votes	%
Labor	Amir Peretz	27,098	42.2%
Labor	Shimon Peres	25,572	39.82%
Labor	Binyamin Ben-Eliezer	10,764	16.76%
Turnout		64,204	63.88%

== Aftermath ==
Peres initially claimed that widespread fraud might have taken place during the primary but met with Peretz and conceded on 11 November. He left the labor party on 30 November to join the newly-formed Kadima party, and was elected President of Israel in 2007. Peretz and the Labor party went on to contest the 2006 election, in which they came in second and won 19 seats, the same amount as in 2003. Peretz was later defeated for re-election as leader of the Labor Party in 2007 by Ehud Barak.
