= Daniel Levy (political analyst) =

British–Israeli Middle East expert

- דניאל לוי
- Levy in 2026
- Education: King's College, Cambridge
- Occupations: Analyst, Author and former Israeli negotiator
- Employer: U.S./Middle East Project
- Father: Lord Michael Levy
- Military career
- Branch: Israel Defense Forces

Daniel Levy (Hebrew: דניאל לוי) is a British–Israeli analyst, commentator, author, and former advisor to the Israeli government with expertise on the Middle East and the Israeli–Palestinian conflict. He was formerly an Israeli negotiator as part of the Taba summit and Oslo II peace process. He is the current president of the U.S./Middle East Project (USMEP) and was one of the founders of J Street.

== Early life and education ==
Daniel Levy is the son of Lord Michael Levy. He studied political science at King's College, Cambridge, at both the bachelor's and master's level. He was World Chairman of the World Union of Jewish Students in Jerusalem from 1991 to 1994.

== Career ==
=== Early career - Peace negotiator ===
He served as an Israeli negotiator in peace talks with Palestinian leaders under Israeli Prime Ministers Yitzhak Rabin (PM 1992–95) and again under Ehud Barak (PM 1999–2001). He was lead drafter of the 2003 Geneva Initiative along with Ghaith al-Omari. From 1999 to 2000 he worked as head of the Jerusalem Affairs unit under Minister Haim Ramon. He served as an advisor to Justice Minister Yossi Beilin.

=== Non-governmental advocacy ===
Levy is current president of the U.S./Middle East Project. He previously headed the Middle East and North Africa program at the European Council on Foreign Relations from 2012 to 2016. He has also worked at the director level on the New America Foundation's Middle East Task Force and as a fellow with the Century Foundation. He previously worked as an analyst with the International Crisis Group.

He is among the co-founders of the organization J Street and has served on the organization's advisory council. He is also a founding board member of Molad: The Center for the Renewal of Israeli Democracy as well as the Diaspora Alliance.

He serves on the board of the New Israel Fund and as a trustee of the Rockefeller Brothers Fund.

=== Media and publications ===
Levy has worked as an editor with Foreign Policy magazine, serving as founding editor of their Middle East Channel. He publishes and speaks widely on matters related to Israel and Palestine. He has been featured in such publications and channels as The Nation, The New York Times, Ha'aretz, the BBC, Al Jazeera, and CNN.

== Views ==
Levy is critical of Israeli occupation of Palestinian lands, labeling such treatment "nondemocracy." He has criticized Israeli political leaders' "pursu[it of] a Jewish ethnocratic state at the expense of a Jewish democratic state."

Regarding his motivations in creating J Street, in 2009, he told The Guardian:

"What we had a hunch about, and was proven when J Street was launched, is that there is this very large constituency of Jewish Americans who do care about Israel and who are cool identifying themselves as pro-Israel. But their pro-Israelness is about the need for Israel to be at peace with its neighbours to gain security, not by being an ongoing expansionist presence. In fact, that endangers Israel."

Levy has publicly expressed concern about the "abuse" and weaponization of the accusation of antisemitism in the context of public discourse about Palestinian and Israeli politics.

He expressed criticism of the Israeli government's actions during the Gaza war, underscoring "the unconscionable and growing cost in civilian life" and the lack of a coherent political vision related to Israel's ongoing military actions. He also simultaneously called for a renewal of Palestinian leadership to be more "inclusive," pointing to the need to incorporate Hamas into the Palestinian Authority.

Despite being involved with the peace process himself earlier in his career, Levy has harshly criticized the recent history of diplomatic approaches to Israel for lacking enforcement mechanisms and consequences for rights violations. He expressed concern that the peace process has become "the refuge of scoundrels who want to maintain the status quo."

Levy's public statements and activities have been criticized in conservative media outlets such as The Washington Examiner and Jewish News Syndicate, including by reporter James Kirchick, and by the Middle East Forum. Critics question his perspective on historical events and perceived lack of support for Israel.
