= 2001 Israeli Labor Party leadership election =

Israeli Labor Party leadership election

- 4 September 2001 (Initial vote); 26 December 2001 (redo in select precincts)

vote by general membership of party
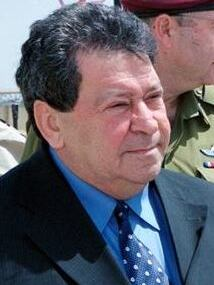

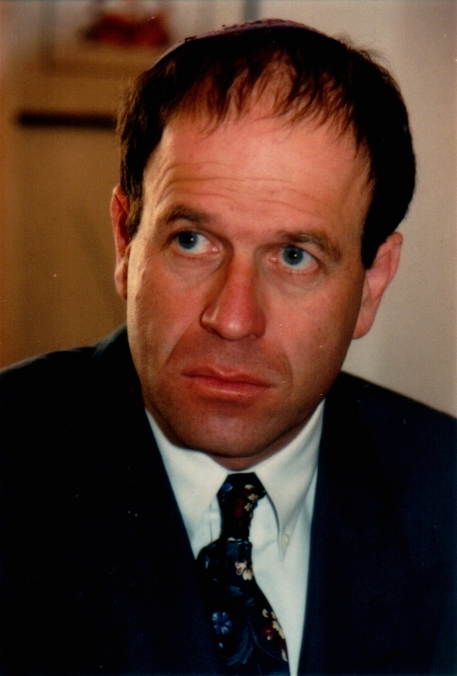
Candidate	Binyamin Ben-Eliezer	Avraham Burg
Party	Labor	Labor
Percentage	48.6% (September); 52.09% (December)	50.1% (September); 47.91% (December)
Leader before election
Ehud Barak
Elected Leader
Avraham Burg (September - December 2001)
Binyamin Ben-Eliezer (December 2001 - )

The 2001 Israeli Labor Party leadership election was held by the Israeli Labor Party on 4 September 2001 to elect the leader of the party. In the initial count of the vote, Speaker of the Knesset Avraham Burg defeated Minister of Defense Binyamin Ben-Eliezer. Following alleged irregularities, the election was partially voided, with several precincts voting for a second time on 26 December. Following the redo, Ben-Eliezer was elected to lead the party, defeating Burg.

== Background ==
Incumbent party leader Ehud Barak announced that he was resigning as party leader after losing his premiership in the special 2001 Israeli prime ministerial election and facing opposition within the party.

== Candidates ==
- Binyamin Ben-Eliezer, member of the Knesset since 1984, minister of Defense since 2001, former deputy prime minister (1999–2001), former minister of construction (1992–1996; 2000–2001), former minister of communications (1999–2001)
- Avraham Burg, member of the Knesset since 1984, speaker of the Knesset since 2000, former acting president of Israel (2000)

== Results ==
=== September ===
In the September election, Burg defeated Ben-Eliezer by a margin of 1,088 votes.

2001 Israeli Labor Party leadership election
Party	Candidate	Votes	%
Labor	Avraham Burg		50.1%
Labor	Binyamin Ben-Eliezer		48.6%
Turnout		71,508	61.8%

=== December ===
After the partial re-vote, the following tabulations were the election's final result:

2001 Israeli Labor Party leadership election
Party	Candidate	Votes	%
Labor	Binyamin Ben-Eliezer	32,910	52.09%
Labor	Avraham Burg	30,367	47.91%
Turnout			~25%
