= Molad: The Center for the Renewal of Israeli Democracy =

Israeli think tank

- Founded: 2012
- Type: Public policy think tank
- Location(s): 20 Emek Refaim German Colony, Jerusalem, Israel
- Executive Director: Mikhael Manekin

Molad: The Center for the Renewal of Israeli Democracy (מולד) is a progressive Israeli think tank established in 2012 in Jerusalem. The Center's website describes it as "dedicated to the fundamental political and social issues of Israeli life".

== History and mission ==
Molad was created in 2012, and its work is divided into three content categories: security and state, citizenship, and socio-economics. Its founders are Avraham Burg, Assaf Sharon and Avner Inbar. Its executive director is Liat Schlesinger, and its academic director is Dr. Assaf Sharon. Daniel Levy was among the founding board members.

According to a 2012 article in Haaretz, Molad is "committed to leftist renewal" in Israel and believes that "the left must present reliable, comprehensible policy on key issues, a policy aimed at reviving the left as a credible, viable political force." Its political views are progressive.

Since its founding, the Center's senior fellows have included high-profile Israeli academics and politicians including Professor of Law Chaim Gans, Bezalel Academy of Art and Design President Eva Illouz, Talia Sasson, author of the Sasson Report. Fellows include economists such as Israel Prize winner Dr. Menahem Yaari and Aix Group co-founder Arie Arnon.

Molad partnered with the Center for American Progress in organizing a symposium addressing U.S. and Israeli foreign policy and regional security in the Middle East, on 1 April 2014.

== Positions ==
Molad is opposed to Israeli settlements in the West Bank. One Molad representative has called the settlement movement a geographical failure, and another stated that the reversibility of the settlements is highly possible. It produced a 2012 report concluding that Israel does not have a "Hasbara", or "PR", problem, but that its image is instead harmed by poor policy.

Also in 2012, Molad published another report recommending the revival of the Arab Peace Initiative. It supported Chuck Hagel's nomination for U.S. Secretary of Defense.

The organization published a report in June 2013 which states that the proposed Basic Law declaring Israel the "nation-state of the Jewish people" is “both illegitimate and dangerous” and “undermines the original values of Zionism.” According to the report: "It is illegitimate because its formulators and backers are attempting to… decide on issues of profound controversy regarding identity, culture, and society."
