= 1997 Israeli Labor Party leadership election =

Israeli Labor Party leadership election

- 3 June 1997

vote by general membership of party
- Turnout: 69.2%
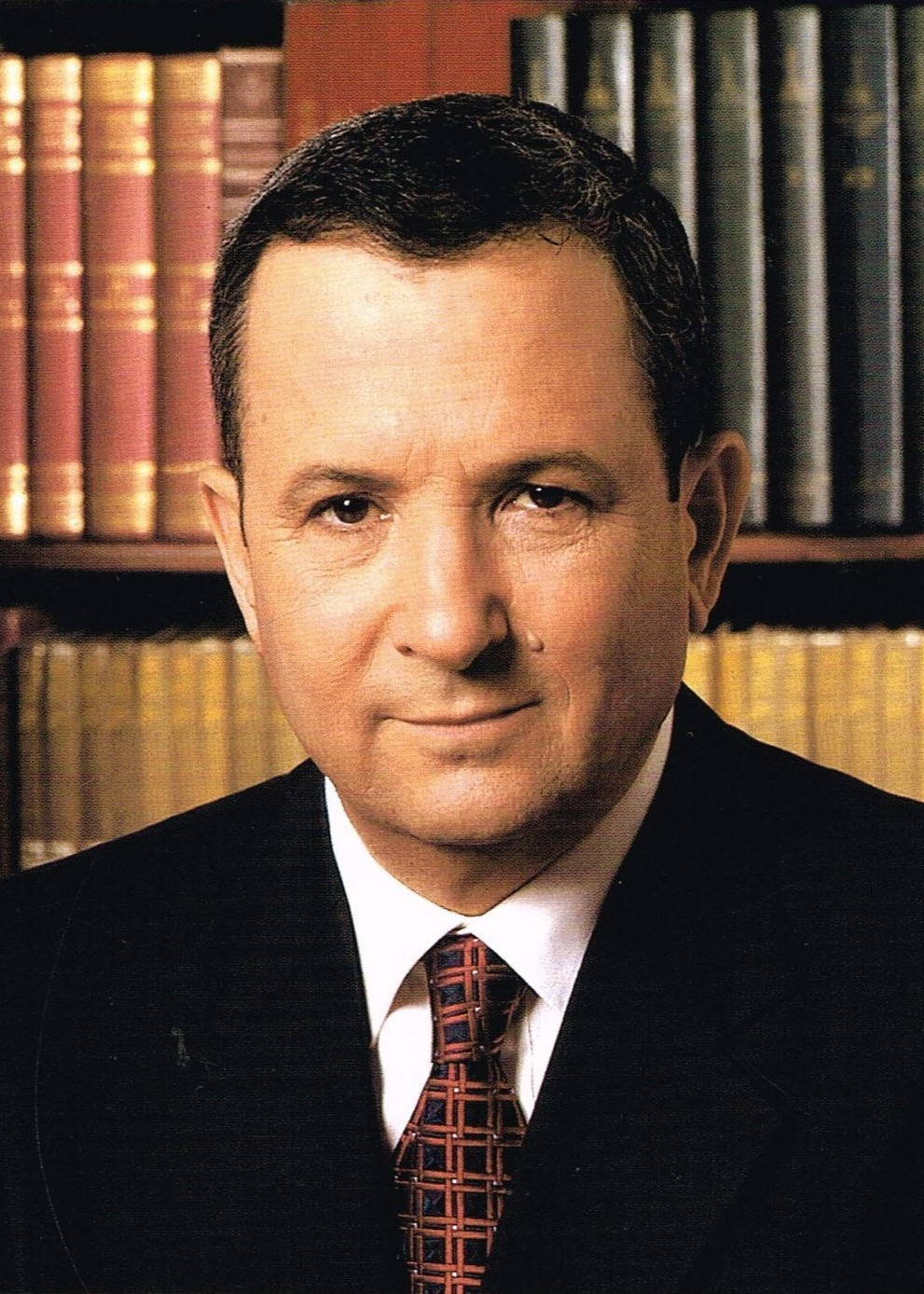

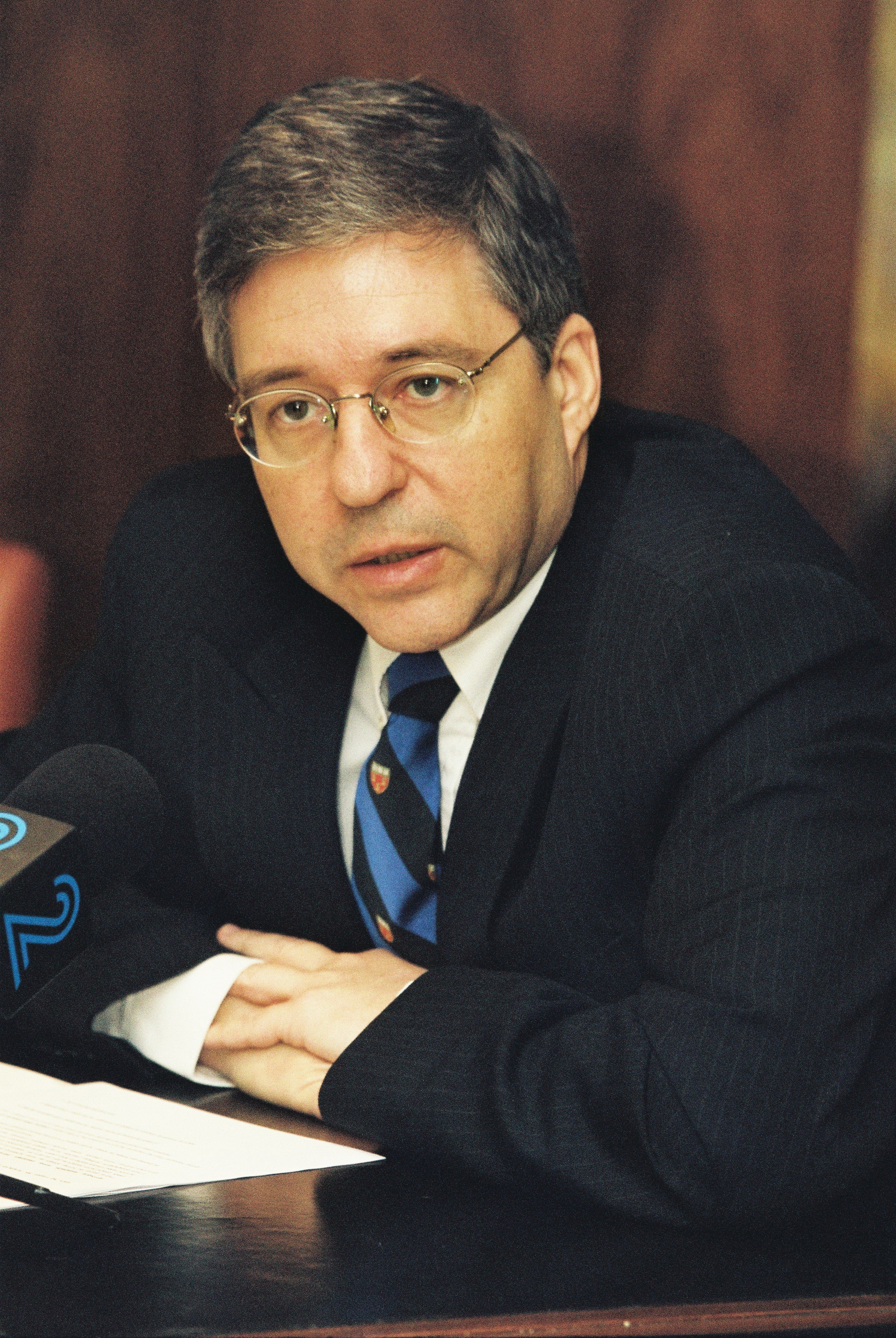

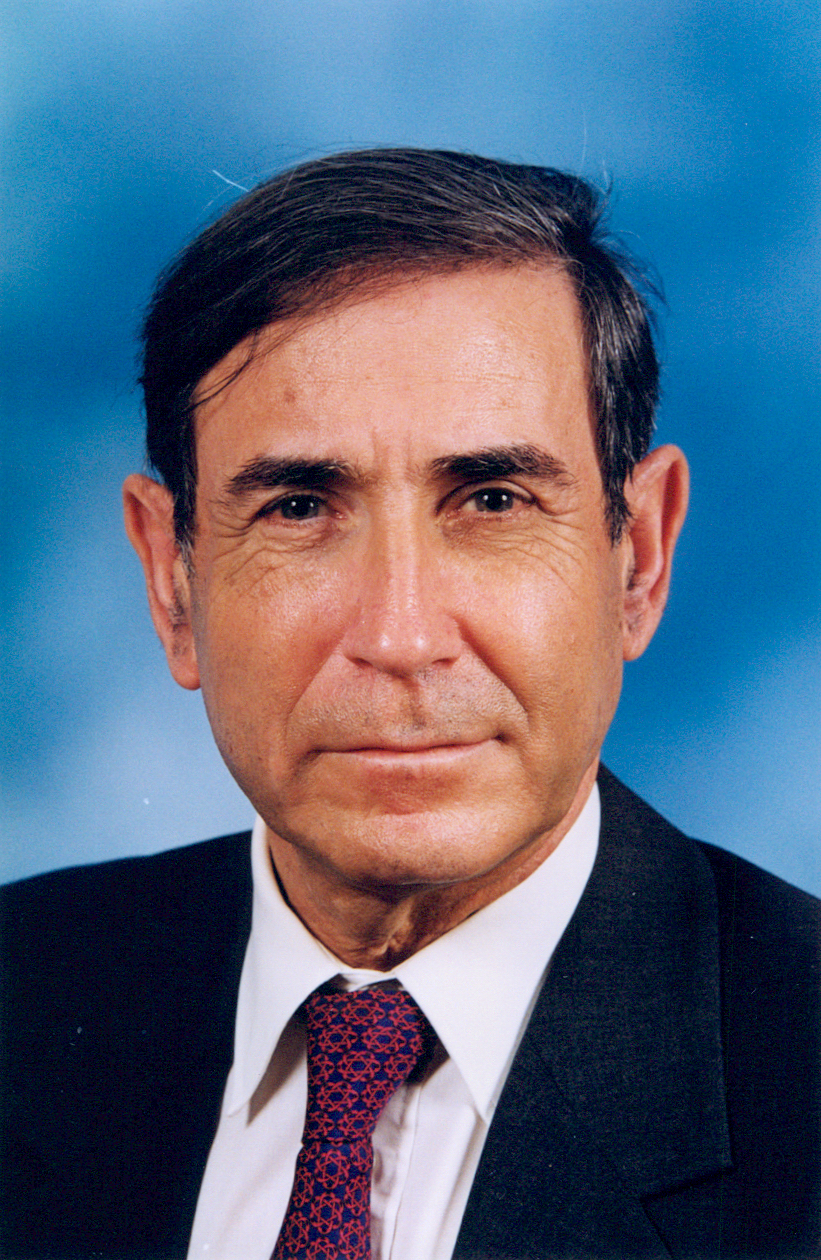

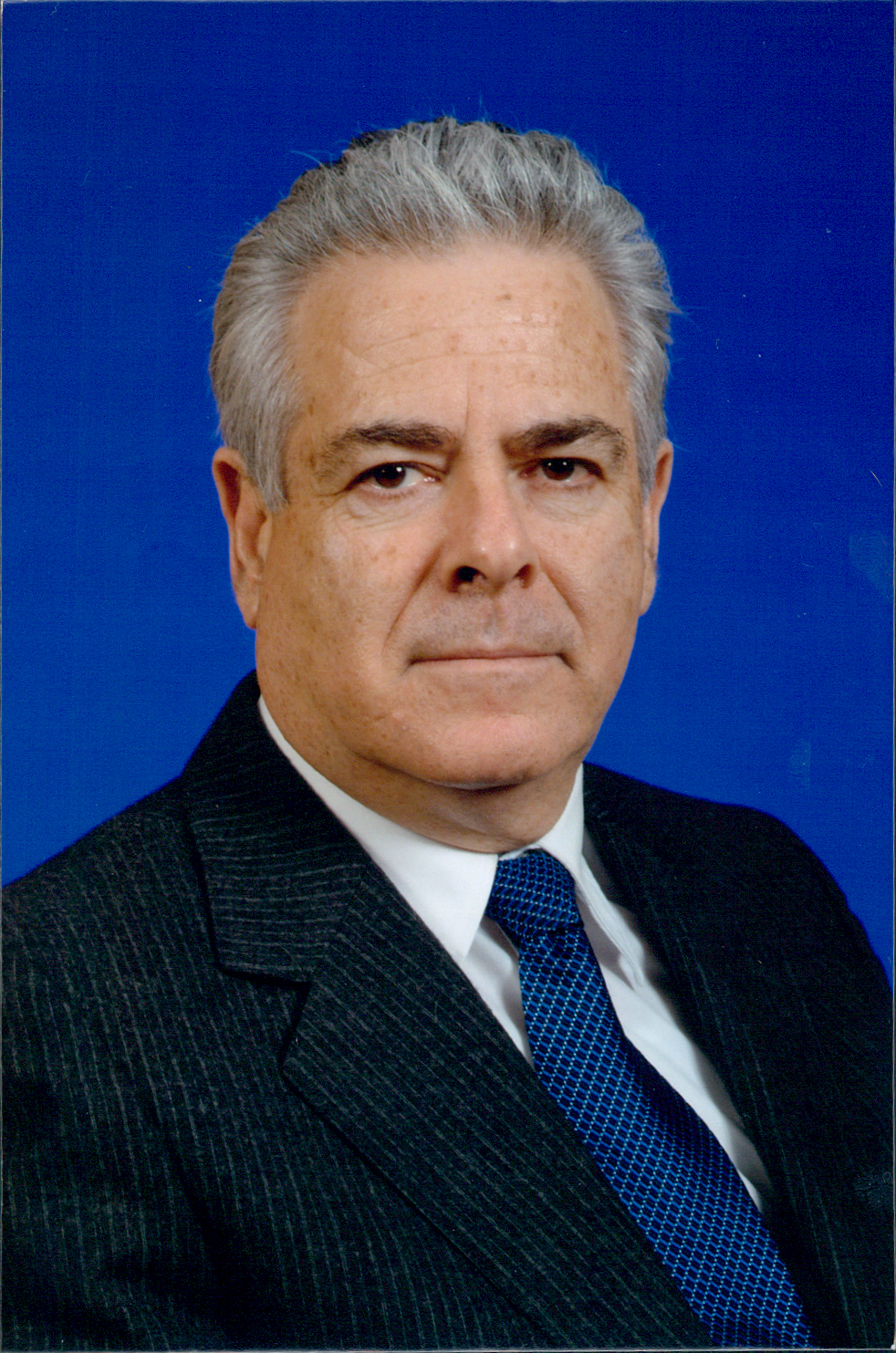
Candidate	Ehud Barak	Yossi Beilin
Percentage	50.3%	28.5%
Candidate	Shlomo Ben-Ami	Efraim Sneh
Percentage	14.2%	6.6%
Leader before election
Shimon Peres
Elected Leader
Ehud Barak

The 1997 Israeli Labor Party leadership election was held on 3 June 1997 to elect the leader of the Israeli Labor Party. It saw the election of Ehud Barak.

== Background ==
The leadership vote took place a year after Shimon Peres' narrow defeat in the 1996 Israeli prime ministerial election. After this defeat, Peres decided to not run for reelection as party leader.

Member of the Knesset Uzi Baram initially sought the leadership, but withdrew in December 1996 and endorsed Barak.

== Results ==
69.2% of the 164,837 general party members that were eligible to vote participated in the election.

1997 Israeli Labor Party leadership election
Candidate	Votes	%
Ehud Barak		50.3
Yossi Beilin		28.5
Shlomo Ben-Ami		14.2
Ephraim Sneh		6.6
Turnout	{{{votes}}}	69.2%
