= Avraham Burg =

Israeli politician (born 1955)

- אברהם בורג
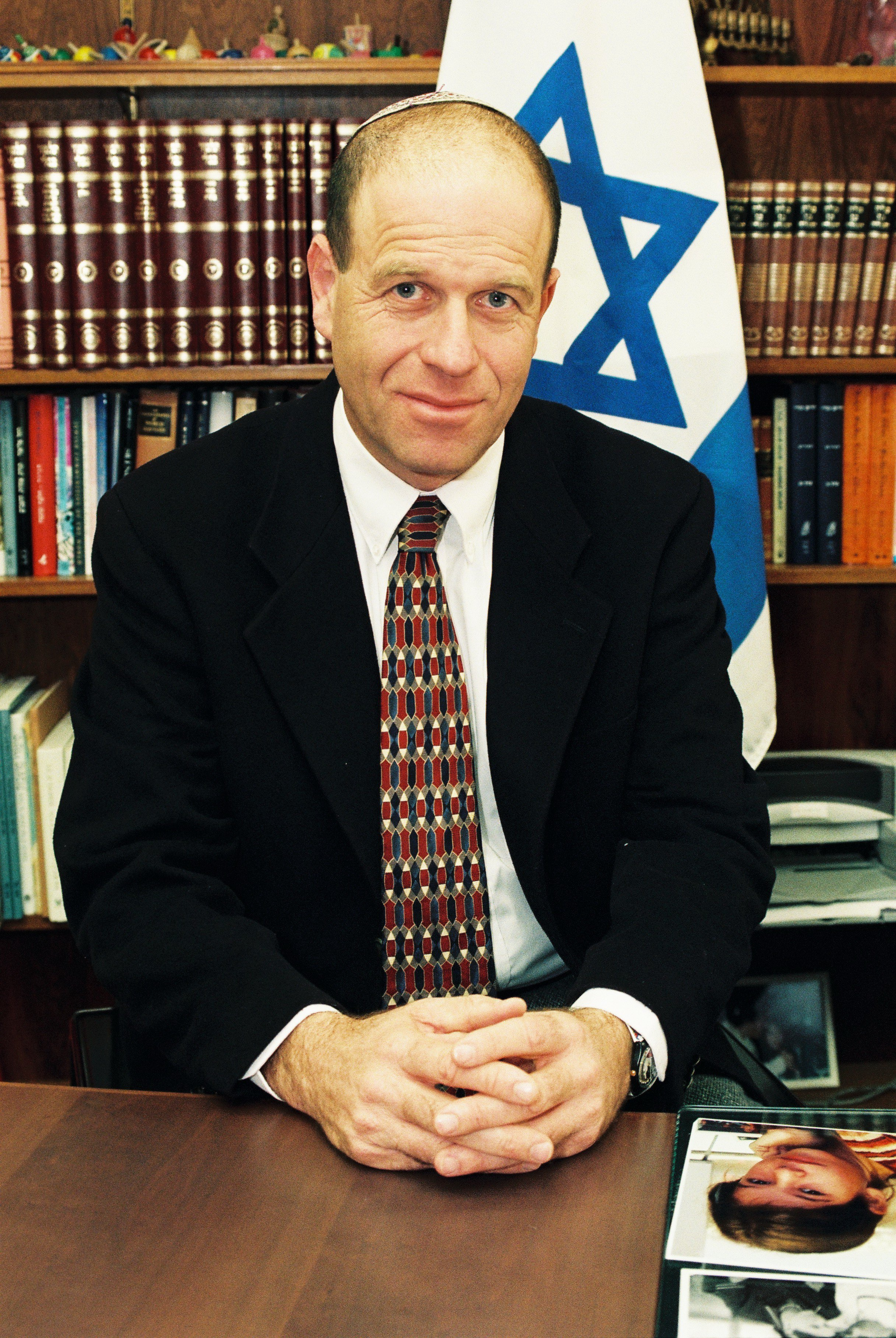
- Official portrait, 1998

Acting President of Israel
- In office 13 July 2000 – 1 August 2000
- Prime Minister: Ehud Barak
- Preceded by: Ezer Weizman
- Succeeded by: Moshe Katsav

Speaker of the Knesset
- In office 6 July 1999 – 17 February 2003
- Preceded by: Dan Tichon
- Succeeded by: Reuven Rivlin

Faction represented in the Knesset
- 1988–1991: Alignment
- 1992–1995: Labor Party
- 1999–2001: One Israel
- 2001–2004: Labor Party

Personal details
- Born: 19 January 1955 (age 71) Jerusalem

Avraham "Avrum" Burg (Hebrew: אברהם "אברוּם" בוּרג; born 19 January 1955) is an Israeli author, politician, and businessman. He was a member of the Knesset, chairman of the Jewish Agency for Israel, Speaker of the Knesset, and interim President of Israel. He was the first Speaker of the Knesset to have been born in Israel after its declaration of independence in 1948. A member of the Labor Party when he was a member of the Knesset, Burg announced in January 2015 that he had joined Hadash.

Since the 2000s, Burg has expressed views described as post-Zionist, a label he self-identified with in 2011. He is in favor of Israel negotiating with Hamas, and has called on his country to abandon Herzelian Zionism (characterizing it as a scaffolding that should be removed) in favor of a form of Cultural Zionism, also citing the civic nationalism of France as an example to follow.

== Early life ==
Burg was born and raised in Jerusalem's Rehavia neighborhood. His father was Yosef Burg, a German-born Israeli politician and longtime government minister for the National Religious Party. His mother was Rivka (née Slonim) who was born in Hebron and a survivor of the 1929 Hebron massacre.

Burg served in the Israel Defense Forces as a platoon commander with the rank of lieutenant in the paratroopers brigade. He graduated from the Hebrew University of Jerusalem with a degree in social sciences.

== Political career ==
Burg was an activist in left-wing organizations and the Peace Now movement. He was injured in the 1983 grenade attack on a Peace Now demonstration in Jerusalem that killed Emil Grunzweig. In 1985, he served as advisor on diaspora affairs to prime minister Shimon Peres. In 1988, he was elected to the Knesset as a member of the Alignment party. In 1992, when Alignment became the Labor Party, he was reelected to Knesset, and served as chairman of the Education Committee.

In 1995, Burg was appointed chairman of the Jewish Agency and the World Zionist Organization, and resigned from the Knesset. As head of the Jewish Agency, he worked to recover Jewish property lost during the Holocaust and in the transfer of approximately half a million predominantly Jewish citizens from the Commonwealth of Independent States (the former Soviet Union) to Israel. After his term as chairman of the Jewish Agency, Burg continued to use a car and driver provided by the agency for 10 years. When it was cut, he sued to continue to receive these benefits, but lost the case, with the judge saying, "Burg didn't explain the fact that he also uses the car for his own personal business."

In 1999, Burg returned to domestic politics, and was elected to the Knesset on Ehud Barak's One Israel list (an alliance of the Labor, Meimad and Gesher parties). Although Barak backed another candidate, Burg was elected speaker of the Knesset, a position he held until early 2003. In this capacity he served as interim president for 20 days, from 12 July until 1 August 2000, when the presidency was vacant following Ezer Weizman's resignation.

Following Barak's defeat in the 2001 prime ministerial election and his subsequent resignation, Burg ran for the Labor Party leadership, and won amid accusations of voter fraud. In a revote he lost to Binyamin Ben-Eliezer. Burg called for the cancellation of the second vote, a move supported by Labor Party chairman Ra'anan Cohen. Nevertheless, Burg retained his seat in the Knesset in the 2003 elections.

In 2003, Burg wrote an article published in Yedioth Ahronoth in which he declared, "Israel, having ceased to care about the children of the Palestinians, should not be surprised when they come washed in hatred and blow themselves up in the centers of Israeli escapism."

== After resignation from politics ==
In 2004, Burg resigned from the Knesset and public life, and became a businessman. In 2007, a Burg-led consortium won the rights to purchase Ashot Ashkelon Industries, but the Israeli government canceled the sale. Burg's attorney said that if it was canceled because the government wanted to sell it together with Israel Military Industries (IMI), then "we may bid for IMI." There had also been a review by the state comptroller and the Israeli police "into suspicions that [Burg] was a straw-man for Ian Nigel Davis and Aviv Algor"; Davis and Algor were indicted in a securities case, on charges of fraudulently obtaining the approval of Middle East Tube shareholders for a 250,000-shekel monthly management fee. The prosecutor closed the file against Burg due to lack of evidence.

Burg has lectured at international events and served on the board of directors of the Vita Pri Hagalil company. He was embroiled in a controversy over an alleged missing 270,000,000 shekels, money lent to Vita Pri Hagalil. Burg called the banks involved "hypocritical" since, according to him, they had received substantial interest payments on the loan. A senior banker questioned this, saying, "had the owners demonstrated serious intent to use the capital injection to rescue the company, there's no question that we'd contribute to the rescue effort. The owners' abandonment of responsibility is what forced us to ask for the appointment of a receiver. We had no choice."

In 2007, Burg published a book, Defeating Hitler, in which he described Israeli society as fascist and violent, which he believed to be a consequence of the continuing trauma from the Holocaust. In a June 2007 Haaretz interview with Ari Shavit, he was critical of the Law of Return, saying: "to define the State of Israel as a Jewish state is the key to its end. A Jewish state is explosive. It's dynamite." He also called on all Israelis to obtain foreign citizenship if possible, having himself acquired French citizenship in 2004. Following public criticism, Burg clarified some of his views in another interview with J.J. Goldberg in The Forward, recommending that Israel be defined not as a "Jewish state" but as a "State of the Jews." Burg also objected to Shavit's claim that he is in favor of "abolishing" the Law of Return, saying "I never said 'abolish'. I said 'rethink.' Look, in the parliamentary mythology of Israel, the Law of Return is an answer to the Nuremberg Laws. That's not its actual origin, but that's how it has come to be seen. Whomever Hitler would have killed, we will accept as a Jew. And I say Hitler will not define me and who I am."

In April 2008, Burg signed a letter of support for the recently created U.S. lobbying group J Street. In November 2008, he joined a new left-wing movement intending to support the Meretz-Yachad party in the 2009 legislative election.

In 2011, Burg wrote an op-ed in Haaretz claiming that there was a reasonable chance that a one-state solution would come to pass. Of the possibility, he wrote, "It is likely to be a country with nationalist, racist and religious discrimination and one that is patently not democratic, like the one that exists today. But it could be something entirely different. An entity with a common basis for at least three players: an ideological right that is prepared to examine its feasibility; a left, part of which is starting to free itself of the illusions of 'Jewish and democratic'; and a not inconsiderable part of the Palestinian intelligentsia. The conceptual framework will be agreed upon — a democratic state that belongs to all of its citizens. The practicable substance could be fertile ground for arguments and creativity. This is an opportunity worth taking, despite our grand experience of missing every opportunity and accusing everyone else except ourselves."

In 2012, Burg endorsed a boycott of products from Israeli settlements, stating that he personally boycotts all products produced in the settlements and does not cross the Green Line. He called Israel "the last colonial occupier in the Western world." In a New York Times editorial published that year, he wrote that Israel had "become more fundamentalist and less modern, more separatist and less open to the outside world."

In 2012, Burg was named a senior fellow and advisor of Molad, a "new think tank committed to leftist renewal." According to Haaretz, "the center is funded by left-liberal foundations and groups from the U.S. associated with the Democratic Party."

In December 2013, Burg confirmed the existence of Israel's nuclear weapons during a speech at a conference aimed at denuclearising the Middle East. He said that the national policy of neither confirming nor denying the existence of such weapons was "outdated and childish."

Burg joined the leftist Jewish-Arab Hadash party in January 2015. In a subsequent interview, he criticized Israel for continuing to follow Zionism as a national ideology and said the Law of Return should be "reduced to a minimum". He also said "We are now at a critical juncture. In 20 years, the country will be in one of two places - either it will be a fundamentalist religious republic with Moshe Feiglin, or it will recover from the wars of the Jews over religion and state, and between the Jordan and the sea we will see the establishment of an Israel-Palestine confederation with open borders".

In April 2015, after Jewish immigration to Israel from Europe had significantly increased following several incidents targeting Jews in Europe, Burg published an op-ed in Haaretz challenging antisemitism allegations and calling on Jews to remain in Europe.

At the start of 2021, Burg announced his plan to appeal to the Supreme Court to have the Ministry of Interior erase from its records that his nationality is Jewish. He said he was doing it in response to the 2018 Jewish Nation-State Law which, in his view, codified "built in discrimination".

In August 2023, Burg was one of more than 1,500 U.S., Israeli, Jewish and Palestinian academics and public figures who signed an open letter titled "The Elephant in the Room" that said that Israel operates "a regime of apartheid" and called on U.S. Jewish groups to speak out against the occupation of Palestine.

Burg announced in August 2026 that he would run with A Place For Us All ahead of the 2026 Israeli legislative election.

In October 2026 he published a new book, Peace is the Only Final Solution for Jews, with a forward by Tucker Carlson, sparking criticism for both the provocative title - referencing Hitler's Final Solution - and his decision to parter with Carlson.

== Personal life ==
Burg married Yael, a French-born psychologist and high school principal. They have six children. The family lives in Nataf, a rural community on the outskirts of Jerusalem.

Burg is vegan. He has been a devoted athlete, running marathons and participating in a few ironman competitions.

== Published works ==
- Brit Am: A Covenant of the People, Proposed Policy Guidelines for the National Institutions of the Jewish People, (1995), Jewish Agency for Israel - OCLC 71534243
- God is Back (2006) (Hebrew) - ISBN 978-965-511-749-3
- Defeating Hitler (2007) Yedioth Ahronoth (Hebrew) - ISBN 978-965-482-460-6
- The Holocaust Is Over: We Must Rise From its Ashes (2008) MacMillan.com, (in English) - ISBN 978-023-060-752-1
- Weekly Torah Portion for Human Beings (2009) (Hebrew) - ISBN 978-965-517-504-2
- Avishag (2011) (Hebrew) - ISBN 978-965-517-965-1
- In Days to Come (2015) (Autobiography) (Hebrew) - ISBN 978-965-566-078-4, (in English) (2018) - ISBN 156-858-978-6
- Peace Is the Only Final Solution for Jews (2026)
