= Mishmar HaSharon =

Kibbutz in central Israel

Mishmar HaSharon: מִשְׁמַר הַשָּׁרוֹן (Hebrew); مشمار هشارون (Arabic)
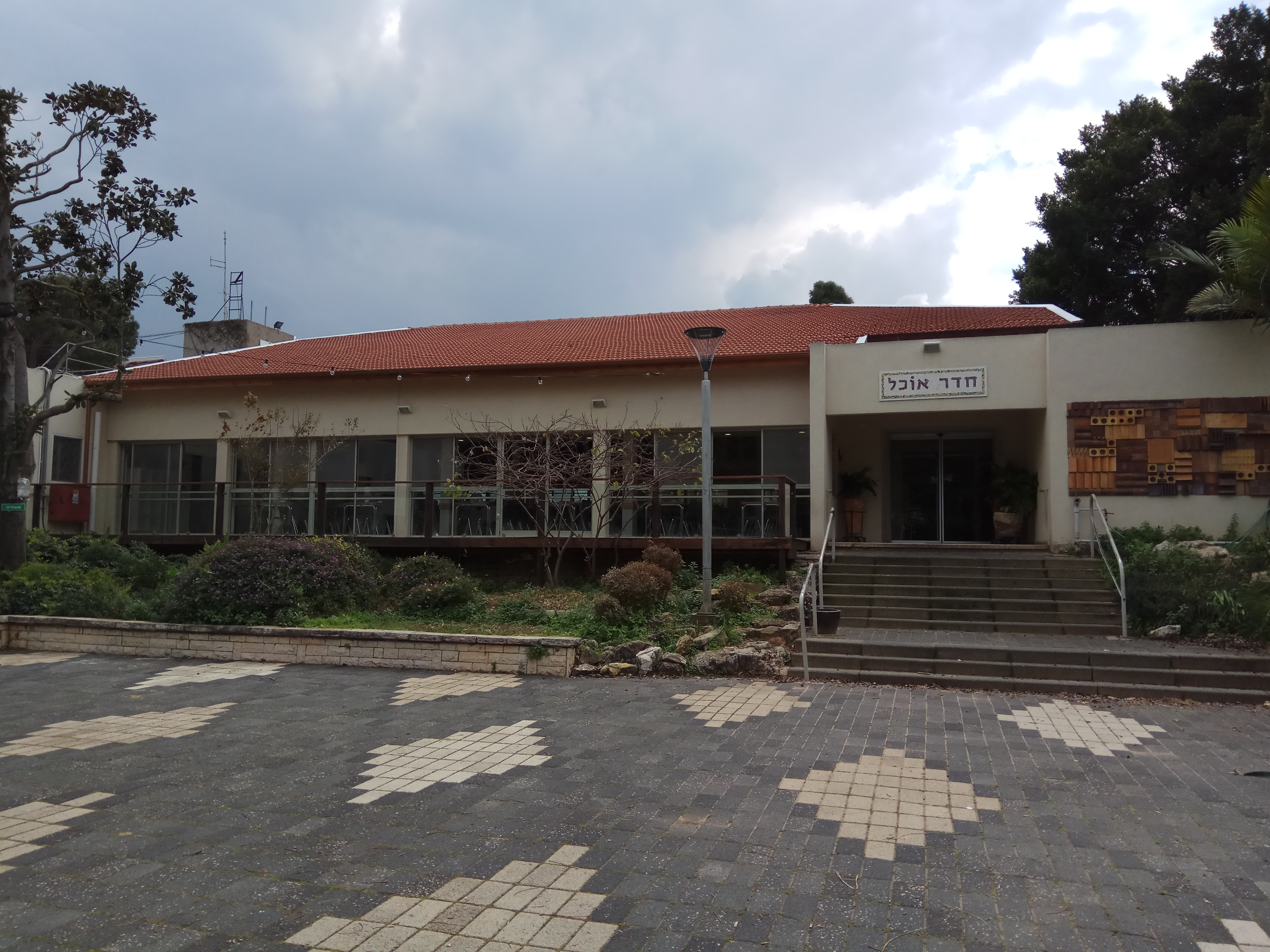
- Etymology: Guard of the Sharon
- Location within Central Israel Location within Israel
- Coordinates: 32°21′31″N 34°54′11″E
- Country: Israel
- District: Central
- Subdistrict: HaSharon
- Council: Hefer Valley
- Affiliation: Kibbutz Movement
- Founded: 1933
- Founder: "Mishmar" members
- Population (2024): 680
- Website: www.mhash.org.il

Mishmar HaSharon (Hebrew: מִשְׁמַר הַשָּׁרוֹן, lit. Guard of the Sharon) is a kibbutz in central Israel. Located in the Sharon plain, it falls under the jurisdiction of Hefer Valley Regional Council. In 2024 it had a population of 680.

== History ==
The community was founded in 1924 by ten Russian immigrants, who were later joined by immigrants from Poland. They initially settled in the Galilee to gain experience of agricultural life. The kibbutz itself was established in 1933, and was later joined by members of Gordonia. It was the birthplace of Prime Minister of Israel Ehud Barak.

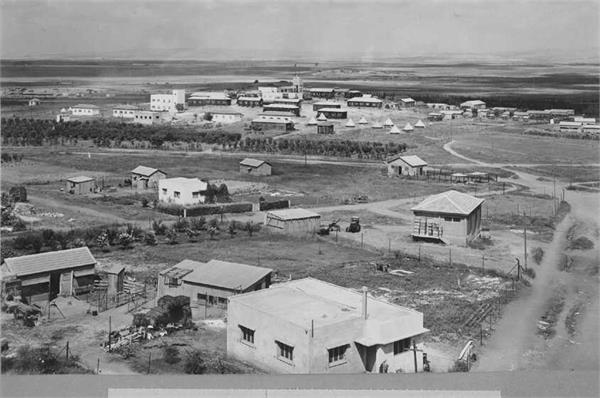
Mishmar HaSharon 1939

== Education ==
The kibbutz is home to Ulpan Mishmar HaSharon. This is a program run by the Jewish Agency for students aged 18–28, where students learn Hebrew while working to meet the kibbutz's needs. The kibbutz has a long history of Ulpan groups, spanning over 50 years, and the Ulpan students are part of normal life on the kibbutz.
