= Amram Mitzna =

Israeli politician and former IDF general (born 1945)

- עמרם מצנע
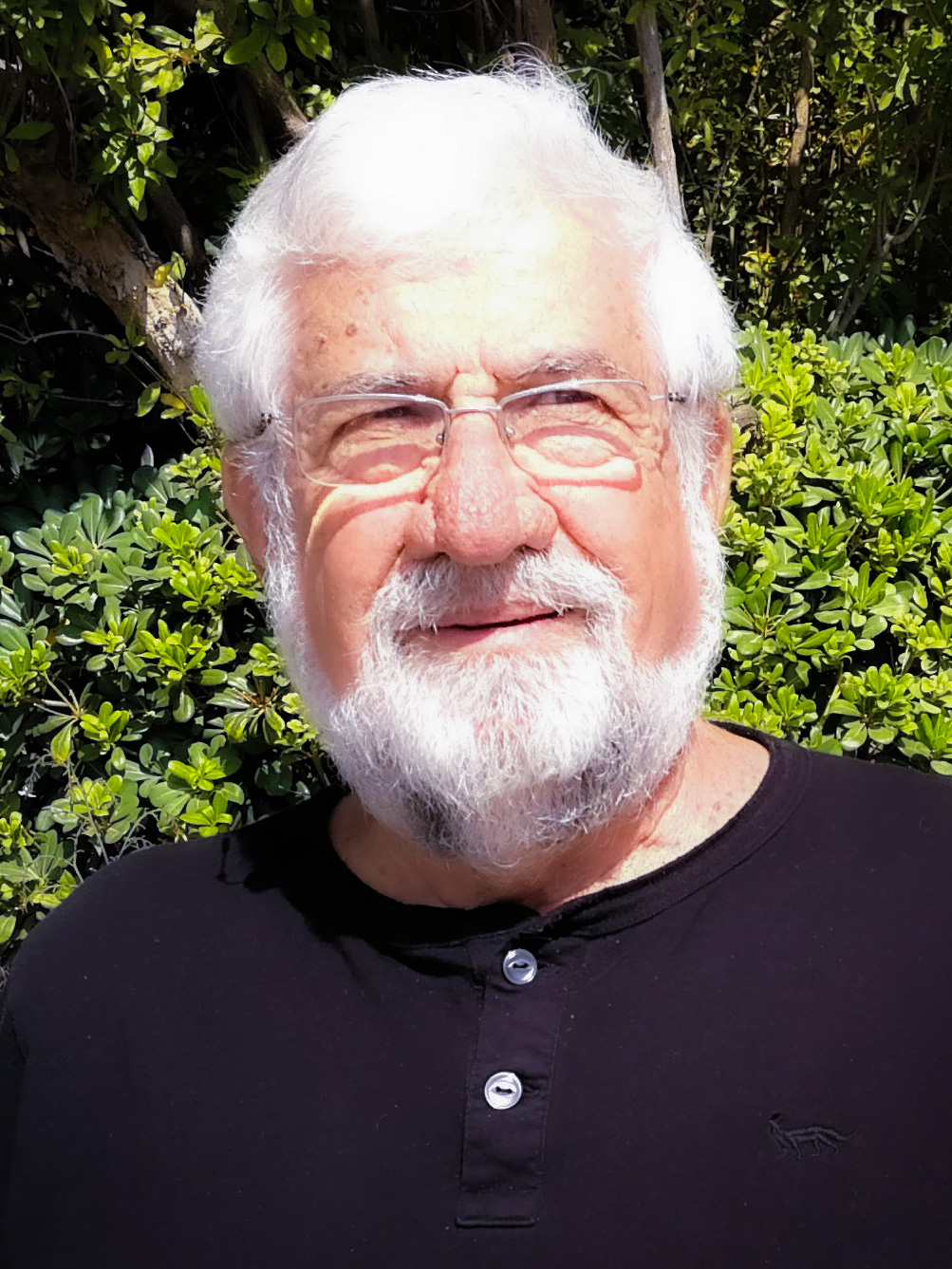

Leader of the Opposition
- In office 12 March 2003 – 13 May 2003
- Prime Minister: Ariel Sharon
- Preceded by: Binyamin Ben-Eliezer
- Succeeded by: Dalia Itzik

Faction represented in the Knesset
- 2003–2005: Labor Party
- 2013–2015: Hatnuah

Mayor of Yeruham
- In office 2005–2010

Mayor of Haifa
- In office 1993–2003
- Preceded by: Arie Gur'el
- Succeeded by: Giora Fisher (acting)

Personal details
- Born: 20 February 1945 (age 81) Dovrat, Mandatory Palestine

Amram Mitzna (Hebrew: עמרם מצנע; born 20 February 1945) is an Israeli politician and former general in the IDF. He is a former mayor of Haifa (1993–2003) and Yeruham (2005–2010) and led the Labor Party from 2002 to 2003. In 2012 he joined Hatnuah.

== Youth, education, and military service ==
Mitzna was born in Kibbutz Dovrat to Jewish refugees who escaped from Nazi Germany. He attended a military boarding school in Haifa, graduating from the Hebrew Reali School in 1963 and enlisting in the IDF the same year. He served in various positions in the IDF armored force, the Command and Staff College, and the Operations Division in the General Staff, receiving the Medal of Distinguished Service for his actions during the Six-Day War and the Yom Kippur War, both of which saw him wounded.

In 1977 he graduated from the University of Haifa with a degree in geography, before studying at the U.S. Army War College in Pennsylvania, finishing his course in 1979.

In 1986 he was promoted to major general, and assisted the Head of the Operations branch. In 1987 he became commander of the Central Command, and in 1989 completed the program for senior public figures at the Weatherhead Center for International Affairs at Harvard University.

In 1990 he became head of the IDF's planning branch, and gained an MA from Haifa University in political science. He retired from the IDF in 1993.

== Political career ==
In 1993, the same year he finished his military career, Mitzna was elected mayor of Haifa representing Labor. He was re-elected in 1998. He won the Labor's leadership election on 19 November 2002 with 53.6% of the vote, defeating incumbent Binyamin Ben-Eliezer and Member of the Knesset Haim Ramon. During campaigning for the 2003 elections, Mitzna proposed that Israel pursue further negotiations with the Palestinian Authority, but if they failed to yield a solution, that Israel withdraw from the Gaza Strip and most of the West Bank, and unilaterally set its final borders. His position was lambasted by Likud leader Ariel Sharon, though later partially implemented by him as the disengagement plan.

Mitzna oversaw Labor's second worst electoral performance up to 2003 when leading it in that year's election, with the party winning just 19 seats. He resigned as party leader shortly thereafter, being replaced by Shimon Peres.

In November 2005, the Internal Affairs Minister appointed Mitzna acting mayor of Yeruham, a town in the southern Negev region, after the elected mayor was forced to step aside, due to incompetence. Mitzna resigned from the Knesset to take up the role.

In April 2008 and June 2009, Mitzna signed letters of support for the recently created J Street American pro-peace lobby group.

Mitzna ran for the leadership of the Labor party a second time in 2011. He won 12% of the vote in the first round and was eliminated. He then endorsed Amir Peretz in the second round.

On 1 December 2012, Mitzna joined Tzipi Livni's new party, Hatnuah. He was elected to the Knesset in second place on the party's list in the 2013 elections. On 24 December 2014 he announced he was retiring from politics and would not seek re-election in 2015, although he supported the Zionist Union, an alliance of Hatnuah and Labor that had been formed for the elections.

Party political offices
| Preceded by Benjamin Ben-Eliezer | Leader of the Israeli Labor Party; 2002–2003 | Succeeded by Shimon Peres |
Political offices
| Preceded by Arie Gur'el | Mayor of Haifa; 1993–2003 | Succeeded by Yona Yahav |
