= Haim Ramon =

Israeli politician (born 1950)

- חיים רמון
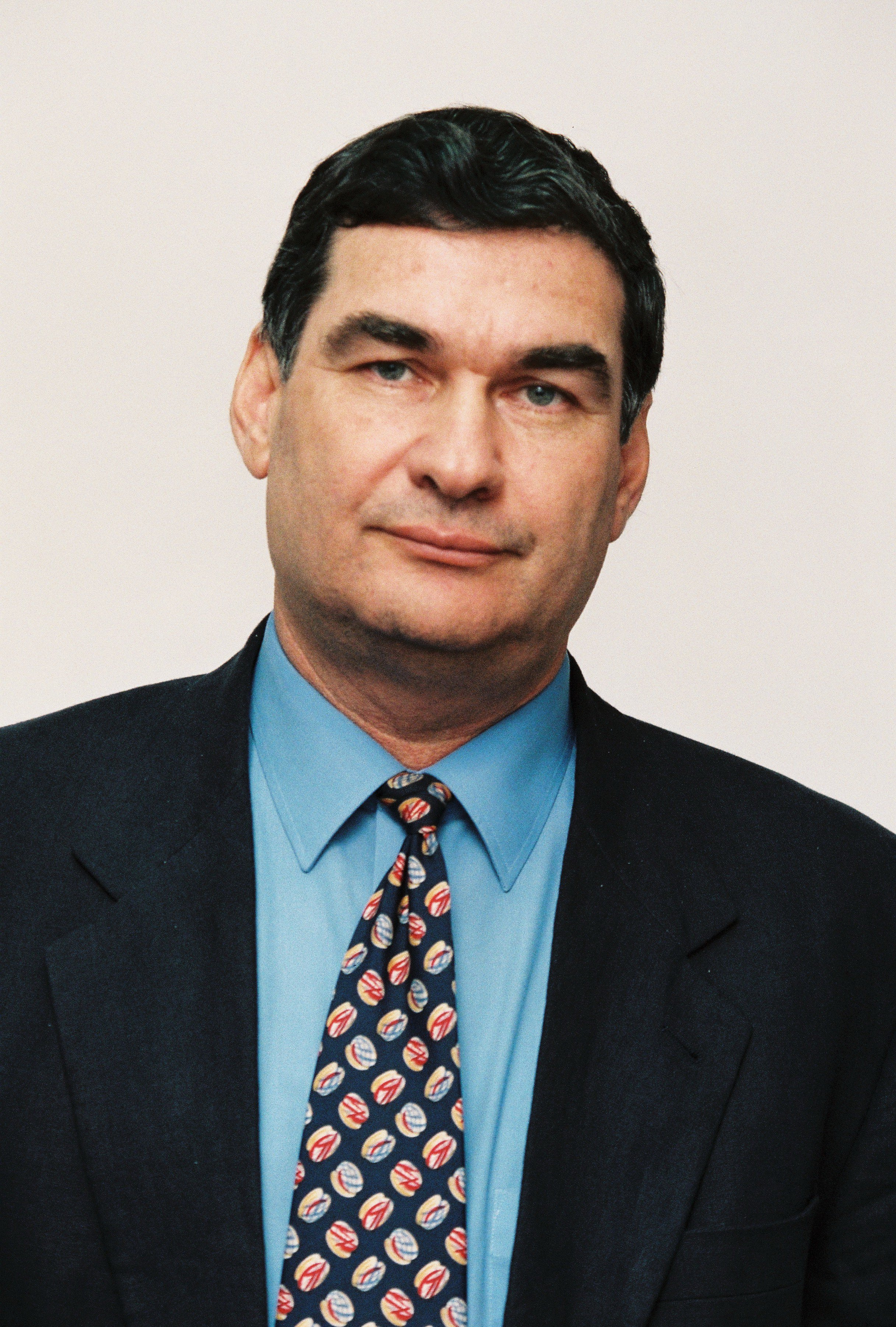

Ministerial roles
- 1992–1994: Minister of Health
- 1995–1996: Minister of Internal Affairs
- 1999–2000: Minister in the Prime Minister's Office
- 2000–2001: Minister of Internal Affairs
- 2005: Minister without Portfolio
- 2006: Minister of Justice
- 2007–2009: Vice Prime Minister

Faction represented in the Knesset
- 1983–1991: Alignment
- 1991–1999: Labor Party
- 1999–2001: One Israel
- 2001–2005: Labor Party
- 2005–2009: Kadima

Personal details
- Born: 10 April 1950 (age 76) Jaffa, Israel

Haim Ramon (Hebrew: חיים רמון; born 10 April 1950) is an Israeli politician who served as a member of the Knesset between 1983 and 2009, and as both Vice Prime Minister and Minister in the Prime Minister's Office with responsibility for state policy.

== Biography ==
Born in Jaffa in 1950, Ramon served in the Israeli Air Force, rising to the rank of captain, before studying law at Tel Aviv University, and earning a BA. He joined the Labor Party (then part of the Alignment alliance) as soon as he left the military, and was secretary of its youth wing from 1978 until 1989. He entered the Knesset in May 1983, replacing Daniel Rosolio, and, except for a period between January 2006 and the March 2006 elections, remained a member until 2009. He has been a member of various committees, and chaired the finance committee from 1988 to 1992.

=== Minister of Health and resignation ===
Ramon was appointed Minister of Health in the government of Yitzhak Rabin in 1992 where his major achievement was the promotion of the new National Health Insurance Law (see also: Universal health care in Israel). In February 1994, he resigned from office, over the failure of the Labor Party to support the proposed health law, which also required breaking the linkage between the Labor Party-affiliated Histadrut Labor Federation and the Clalit Health Service Fund. In a dramatic speech at a party gathering he compared the party members to beached whales and resigned his position. However, Ramon kept advocating for the law even after his resignation and it was finally passed by the Knesset in the summer of 1994.

=== Histadrut chairmanship ===
In 1994, Ramon split from the Labor Party to form a list called "New Life in the Histadrut" together with Amir Peretz. In the subsequent Histadrut elections he beat the Labor faction which had controlled the Histadrut since its founding. He proceeded to privatize most of the Histadrut-owned companies. As a result, the National Health Insurance Law was approved during his term of office. Based on recommendations of the Shoshana Netanyahu Commission from 1990 which undertook an exhaustive review of the healthcare system in Israel in the late 1980s, the law went into effect on 1 January 1995.

Before the law was passed, health insurance was optional. Even so, 96% of the population was insured. Nevertheless, the law revolutionized the healthcare sector in Israel by streamlining the management, delivery and public financing of medical services in the country and guaranteeing minimum coverage levels to all citizens.

=== Return to government ===
Ramon returned to government after Rabin's assassination, serving as Minister of Internal Affairs under Shimon Peres from 1995 to 1996, when Labor lost power.

=== Failed Labor leadership bid ===
When Labor returned to power in 1999 under Ehud Barak, Ramon was appointed Minister in the Prime Minister's Office, overseeing government reform and relations between the government and Knesset. He became Minister of Internal Affairs for a second time in 2000, serving until Barak's government fell in 2001. He opposed Barak's proposals to enter a coalition under Ariel Sharon, and did not participate in the coalition formed in March 2002 by Sharon and Binyamin Ben-Eliezer, Barak's successor as Labor leader. He ran for the leadership of the Labor Party in November 2002, losing to Amram Mitzna. In January 2005, the Labor Party entered the government of Ariel Sharon and Ramon became Minister without Portfolio responsible for Jerusalem Affairs, departing in November 2005 with the other Labor ministers.

=== Joining Kadima ===
Following Sharon's break from Likud, and the formation of the centrist Kadima party with which he was deeply involved, and after the resignation of Labor ministers, Ramon broke from Labor and joined Kadima. He was the first Labor politician to join Kadima, while others only followed later, including former President of Israel, Shimon Peres and Dalia Itzik, who joined Kadima after several days. In the government formed in 2006 and headed by Ehud Olmert, Ramon was appointed Justice Minister. During the 2006 Israel-Lebanon conflict, Ramon emerged as one of the most hawkish members of cabinet.

=== Business positions and non-governmental activities ===
On 27 July 2006, following a seven-hour police interrogation of Ramon, Attorney General Menachem Mazuz instructed the Justice Minister, in response to Ramon's question, to refrain from making executive decisions relating to law enforcement, including the appointment of judges and the granting of amnesty, while under a sexual assault investigation. On the same day Ramon also stated, "Everyone in southern Lebanon is a terrorist and is connected to Hezbollah." On 17 August, Mazuz decided to indict Ramon for indecent assault. Ramon responded by saying: "I am certain of my innocence. The court will prove it." As promised before, Ramon announced his resignation on 18 August. He was convicted on 31 January 2007, and sentenced to 100 hours of community service, which he served in a therapeutic riding center in Tel Mond assisting children with disabilities. The court did not find moral turpitude in his actions.

He returned to prime minister Ehud Olmert's government in July 2007, as vice premier and minister in the Prime Minister's Office with responsibility for state policy and special missions in the name of prime minister Olmert. In a hearing in the High Court of Justice regarding his return to the government, Judge Edna Arbel ruled that Ramon is "not to be seen as a sex offender".

On 30 June 2009, Ramon announced his resignation from the Knesset. He declared that he intends to become a private businessman, but will remain the chairman of the Kadima Council, the party's most important body.

As of July 2020, Ramon was appointed chairman of the board of Vonetize, a company focused on the commercialization of medical and recreation cannabis.

=== Personal details ===
Ramon is married to Vered Ramon Rivlin, editor-in-chief of the monthly Lady Globes. He has two children from his previous marriage. He was the chairman and co-owner of the soccer club Hapoel Tel Aviv.

== See also ==
- List of Israeli public officials convicted of crimes or misdemeanors
