= Binyamin Ben-Eliezer =

Israeli general and politician (1936–2016)

- בִּנְיָמִין בֶּן אֱלִיעֶזֶר
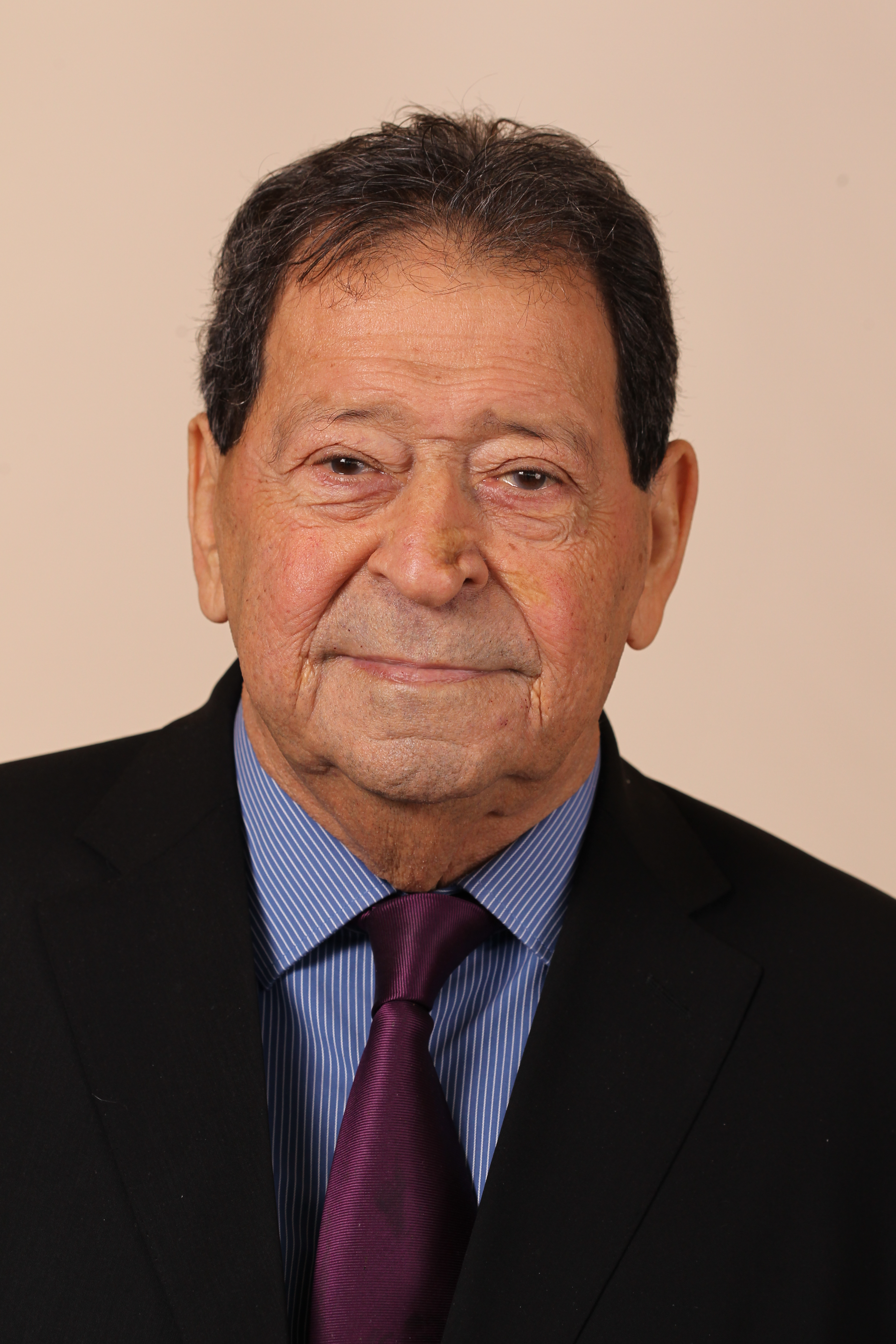
- Binyamin Ben-Eliezer in 2013

Leader of the Opposition
- In office 4 November 2002 – 12 March 2003
- Prime Minister: Ariel Sharon
- Preceded by: Yossi Sarid
- Succeeded by: Amram Mitzna

Ministerial roles
- 1992–1996: Minister of Housing & Construction
- 1999–2001: Deputy Prime Minister
- 1999–2001: Minister of Communications
- 2000–2001: Minister of Housing & Construction
- 2001–2002: Minister of Defense
- 2005: Minister of National Infrastructure
- 2006–2009: Minister of National Infrastructure
- 2009–2011: Minister of Industry, Trade & Labour

Faction represented in the Knesset
- 1984: Yahad
- 1984–1991: Alignment
- 1991–1999: Labor Party
- 1999–2001: One Israel
- 2001–2014: Labor Party

Personal details
- Born: 12 February 1936 Basra, Kingdom of Iraq
- Died: 28 August 2016 (aged 80) Tel Aviv, Israel

Binyamin "Fuad" Ben-Eliezer (Hebrew: בִּנְיָמִין "פוּאד" בֶּן אֱלִיעֶזֶר, lit. 'Benjamin, son of Eliezer', Arabic: بنيامين بن إليعازر; 12 February 1936 – 28 August 2016) was an Iraqi-born Israeli politician and general. He served as a member of the Knesset between 1984 and 2014, and held several ministerial posts, including Minister of Industry, Trade and Labour; Minister of Defense; and Deputy Prime Minister. He served as leader of the Israeli Labor Party between 2001 and 2002.

== Biography ==
Ben-Eliezer was born in Basra in southern Iraq to an Iraqi-Jewish family, the son of Saleh and Farha Elazar. His name at birth was Fuad Elazar. He immigrated to Israel in 1950, where his name was Hebraized to Binyamin Ben-Eliezer. He was drafted into the Israel Defense Forces in 1954 and became a career soldier.

He lived in Rishon LeZion and was married with five children. Some of his granddaughters live in the United States. He was fluent in Hebrew, Arabic and English.

== Military career ==
Ben-Eliezer was drafted into the IDF in 1954 and served in the Golani Brigade. He served in the Brigade as a soldier and as a squad leader. In 1956 he became an infantry officer after completing Officer Candidate School and return to the Golani Brigade, and fought in the Sinai war. Ben-Eliezer served as a Commander of sayerert shaked in the Six-Day War and was wounded in the War of Attrition. In the Yom Kippur War he served as a brigade Executive officer. In 1977, he was appointed First Commanding Officer in Southern Lebanon, serving as the army liaison between the Lebanese Christian militias and Israel. He was Military Governor of the Israeli-occupied West Bank (1978–81) and was Coordinator of Government Activities in the Territories from 1983 until 1984. He completed his military service with the rank of Brigadier General.

== Political career ==
After retiring from the army, Ben-Eliezer was briefly a member of the Tami Party, a grouping of Israeli Jews of "Mizrahi" or Middle Eastern origin. Ben-Eliezer was first elected to the Knesset in 1984 on the Yahad list, which merged into the Alignment during his first term. He was re-elected in 1988 and 1992, by which time the Alignment had become the Labor Party. In July 1992 he was appointed Minister of Housing and Construction in Yitzhak Rabin's government. He retained his seat in the 1996 elections, but lost his place in the cabinet as Labor went into opposition. Following Ehud Barak's victory in the 1999 Prime Minister election, Ben-Eliezer returned to the cabinet as Deputy Prime Minister and Minister of Communications. From October 2000 to 3 March 2001, he also served as Minister of Housing and Construction.

After Ariel Sharon (leader of Likud) defeated Barak in the February 2001 snap election for Prime Minister, Ben-Eliezer was appointed Minister of Defense in the national unity government. He was elected the new leader of the Labor Party in a late 2001 leadership election held after Barak's resignation as leader. Ben-Eliezer left his post as Minister of Defense on 2 October 2002 when Labor withdrew from the coalition. His tenure as Labor Party leader ended the following month after Amram Mitzna unseated him in the 20 November 2002 leadership election.

Re-elected again to the Knesset on the Labor Party list in 2003, Ben-Eliezer served as Minister of National Infrastructure from 10 January 2005 until 23 November, when Labor left the government. In the Labor Party leadership election on 9 November 2005, he came third with 16.8% of the vote, behind Amir Peretz and Shimon Peres. He retained his seat again in the 2006 elections, and was appointed Minister of National Infrastructure in Ehud Olmert's government.

In March 2007, Ben-Eliezer was forced to cancel a trip to Egypt after being warned by Egyptian intelligence that he could be arrested, when Egyptian media and opposition implicated him in the 'massacre' of 250 Egyptian POWs during the Six-Day War following an Israeli documentary. However, the allegations are disputed by both Binyamin Ben-Eliezer and the documentary film-maker Ran Edelist. Placed eighth on the party's list, he was re-elected again in the 2009 elections and appointed Minister of Industry, Trade and Labour. He resigned from the cabinet after Ehud Barak left the Labor Party to establish Independence in January 2011.

He contracted pneumonia in March 2011 and was put into a medically induced coma, eventually making a full recovery. He was re-elected in the 2013 elections, but resigned from the Knesset for health reasons in December 2014, and was replaced by Raleb Majadele.

Ben-Eliezer was a candidate to succeed Shimon Peres as President of Israel in 2014, but withdrew after allegations of corruption surfaced against him.

== Views and opinions ==
Ben-Eliezer was considered a hawk on foreign policy and was one of the main architects of the invasion of Lebanon as well as a strong proponent for Operation Defensive Shield. He advocated halting peace talks with Palestinians until there was an end to violence against Israelis, although he believed once their leadership is able to put a stop to terrorism and abandon it as a political tool there should be "compromise" in final status talks with the Palestinian Authority.

Ben-Eliezer warned in 2012: "So far Palestinians have kept quiet, but one day they will awake and the explosion will happen. People don't accept [being] under military rule for 50 years."

== Death ==
On the afternoon of 28 August 2016, Binyamin died at the Tel Aviv Sourasky Medical Center from kidney disease. He was 80 years old.

== See also ==
- Iraqi Jews in Israel

Party political offices
Preceded by Ehud Barak	Labor Party Leader; 2001–2002	Succeeded by Amram Mitzna
