= 2001 Israeli prime ministerial election =

- 6 February 2001
- Turnout: 62.29%
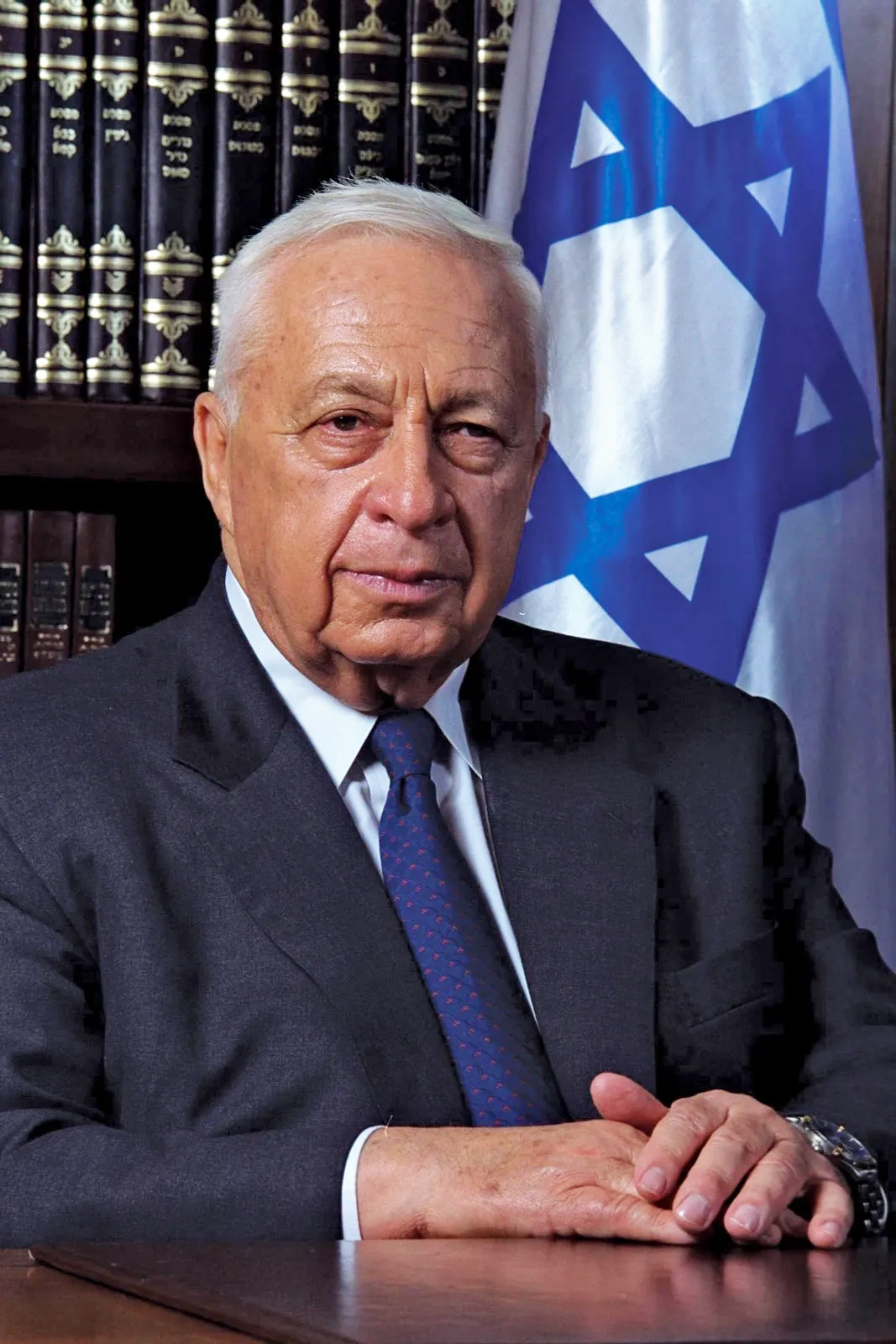

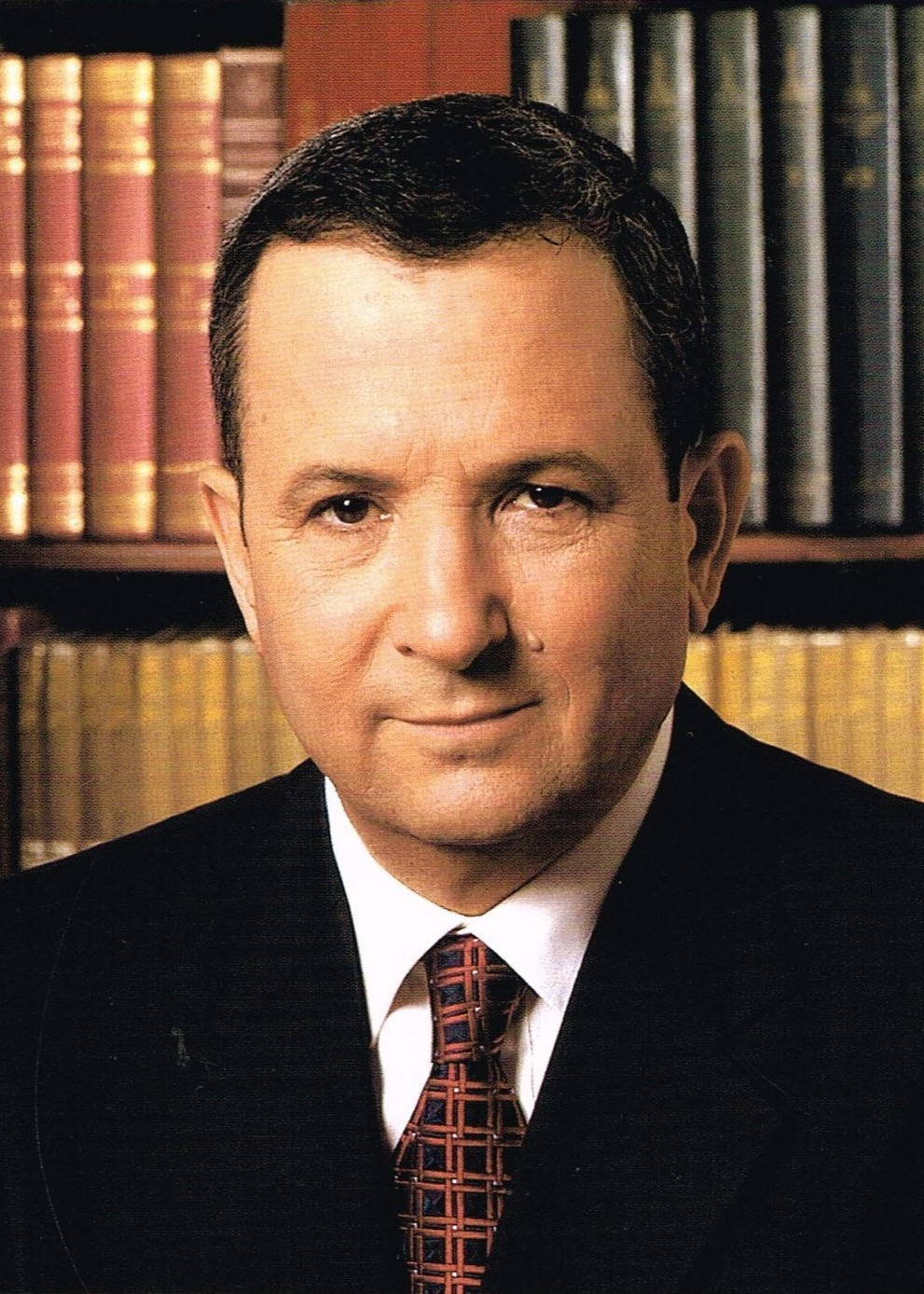
Candidate	Ariel Sharon	Ehud Barak
Party	Likud	Labor
Popular vote	1,698,077	1,023,944
Percentage	62.38%	37.62%
Prime Minister before election
Ehud Barak
Labor
Prime Minister after election
Ariel Sharon
Likud

Prime ministerial elections were held in Israel on 6 February 2001 following the resignation of the incumbent Prime Minister Ehud Barak on 9 December 2000. Barak stood for re-election against Likud's Ariel Sharon.

The third and last prime ministerial elections (separate elections were scrapped before the next Knesset elections in 2003), they were the only ones not held alongside simultaneous Knesset elections.

Voter turnout was 62%, the lowest turnout for any national election held in Israel. The low turnout was at least partially due to many Israeli Arabs boycotting the elections in protest at the October 2000 events in which thirteen Israeli Arabs were killed by the police. Other possible reasons are Sharon's massive lead in opinion polling, and the lack of enthusiasm among Barak supporters due to his perceived failings, notably, the failure of the 2000 Camp David talks with the Palestinians, and the "turbine affair" in which Barak yielded to the religious parties' pressure, violating previous promises.

== Background ==
=== Israeli withdrawal from Lebanon ===
In 2000, 18 years after Israel occupied Southern Lebanon in the 1982 Lebanon War, Israel unilaterally withdrew its remaining forces from the "security zone" in southern Lebanon. Several thousand members of the South Lebanon Army (and their families) left with the Israelis. The following month, the UN confirmed that Israel's force deployment was now entirely consistent with the various security council resolutions with regard to Lebanon. Lebanon claims that Israel continues to occupy Lebanese territory called "Sheba'a Farms" (however this area was governed by Syria until 1967 when Israel took control). The Sheba'a Farms dispute has provided Hezbollah with a ruse to maintain warfare with Israel. The Lebanese government, in contravention of the UN resolution, did not assert sovereignty in Southern Lebanon, which came under the control of Hezbollah.

=== 2000 Camp David Summit ===
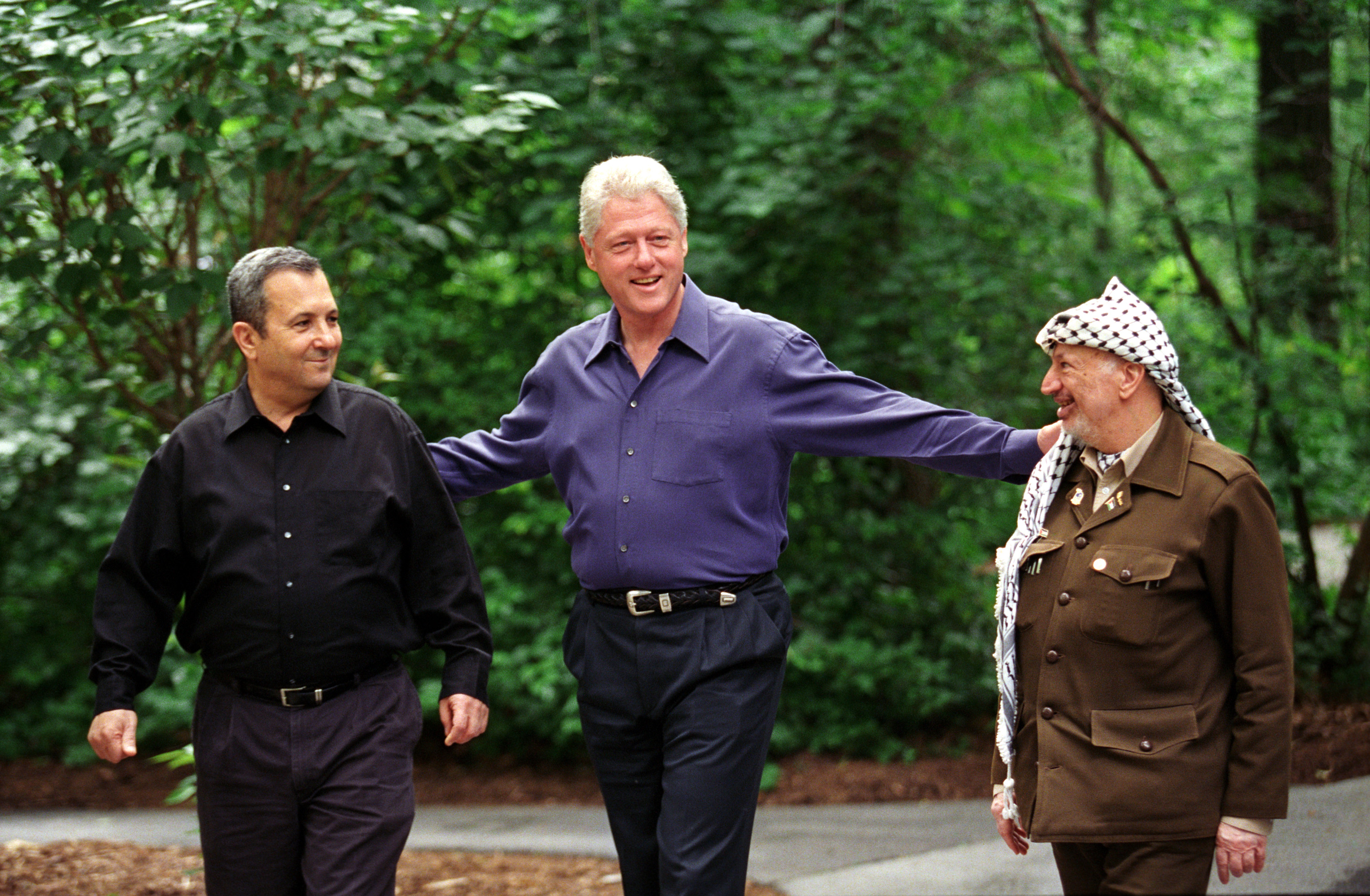
Ehud Barak, Bill Clinton, and Yasser Arafat during the 2000 Camp David Summit

In the summer of 2000, talks were held at Camp David to reach a "final status" agreement on the Israeli–Palestinian conflict. The summit collapsed after Yasser Arafat would not accept a proposal drafted by American and Israeli negotiators. Barak was prepared to offer the entire Gaza Strip, a Palestinian capital in a part of East Jerusalem, 73% of the West Bank (excluding eastern Jerusalem) raising to 90–94% after 10–25 years, and financial reparations for Palestinian refugees for peace. Israel would therefore have gained an additional 6–10% of the West Bank, including more of East Jerusalem than previously held, and Palestinian leaders would have had to give up the Right of Return. Arafat turned down the offer without making a counteroffer.

=== Second Intifada ===
On September 28, 2000, Israeli opposition leader Ariel Sharon visited the Temple Mount. The following day the Palestinians launched the al-Aqsa Intifada, which included increased Palestinian terror attacks against Israeli civilians. Both Palestinian and Israeli sources allege the terrorism was planned much earlier.

The Second Intifada had a major impact on the election, as the occurrence of each single terror fatality is associated with a 0.45 percentage point increase in relative electoral support for the right wing of political parties, if the fatality occurs within 3 months of the election. This increased Likud party support which helped Ariel Sharon win the election.

=== October 2000 events ===
The October 2000 events were a series of large-scale protests carried out by Israeli Arabs, mostly alongside major Israeli highways, following the outbreak of the Second Intifada. In some cases, the protests escalated into clashes with the Israeli Police involving rock-throwing, firebombing, and live-fire. Policemen used tear-gas and opened fire with rubber-coated bullets and later live ammunition in some instances, many times in contravention with police protocol governing crowd-dispersion. In all, during these protests 12 Arab citizens of Israel and a Palestinian from the Gaza Strip were killed by Israeli Police, while an Israeli Jew was killed when his car was hit by a rock on the Tel Aviv–Haifa freeway.

These events led to a significant drop in support for Ehud Barak amongst the Israeli Arab population. In addition, the severity of the events in which main highways were blocked, many vehicles were attacked, communities and government institutions were attacked, full or partial blockade was imposed on several towns, and in which many shops were burned, led also to a decrease in Ehud Barak's popularity among the Israeli Jewish public.

Following the protests, there was a high degree of tension between Jewish and Arab citizens and distrust between the Arab citizens and police. An investigation committee, headed by Supreme Court Justice Theodor Or, reviewed the protests and found that the police were poorly prepared to handle such disturbances and charged major officers with bad conduct. The Or Commission reprimanded Prime Minister Ehud Barak and recommended Shlomo Ben-Ami (then the Internal Security Minister) not serve again as Minister of Public Security. The committee also blamed Arab leaders and Knesset members for contributing to inflaming the atmosphere and making the violence more severe.

== Campaign ==
=== Endorsements by parties ===
https://www.ynet.co.il/articles/0,7340,L-501528,00.html

Vote	Other parties supporting
Sharon	Shas
Barak	Meretz
boycott	Ra'am
boycott	Ta'al
no endorsement	Hadash

== Pre-election opinion polling ==
Date	Polling firm	Publisher	Ehud Barak	Ariel Sharon	Blank note	Will not vote	Refused			
Date	Polling firm	Publisher	6 Feb	Gallup Israel	Maariv	34%	48.7%	1.9%	7.8%	7.6%
29 Jan	Gallup Israel	Maariv	32.1%	52%	2%	8.2%	5.7%			
17 Jan	Gallup Israel	Maariv	30.7%	51.4%	N/A	N/A	N/A			

== Results ==
Candidate	Party	Votes	%
Ariel Sharon	Likud	1,698,077	62.38
Ehud Barak	Labor Party	1,023,944	37.62
Total		2,722,021	100.00
Valid votes		2,722,021	97.01
Invalid/blank votes		83,917	2.99
Total votes		2,805,938	100.00
Registered voters/turnout		4,504,769	62.29
Source: Nohlen et al.

== Aftermath ==
After winning the election, Sharon needed to form a government in the Knesset. However, because there had been no Knesset elections, Labor remained the largest party.

The result was a national unity government involving eight parties; Labor, Likud, Shas, the Centre Party, the National Religious Party, United Torah Judaism, Yisrael BaAliyah, the National Union and Yisrael Beiteinu. The government initially had 26 ministers, though this later rose to 29.

New Knesset elections were called in 2003, which resulted in a landslide victory for Sharon's Likud.
