= Ehud Barak =

Prime Minister of Israel from 1999 to 2001

- אֵהוּד בָּרָק
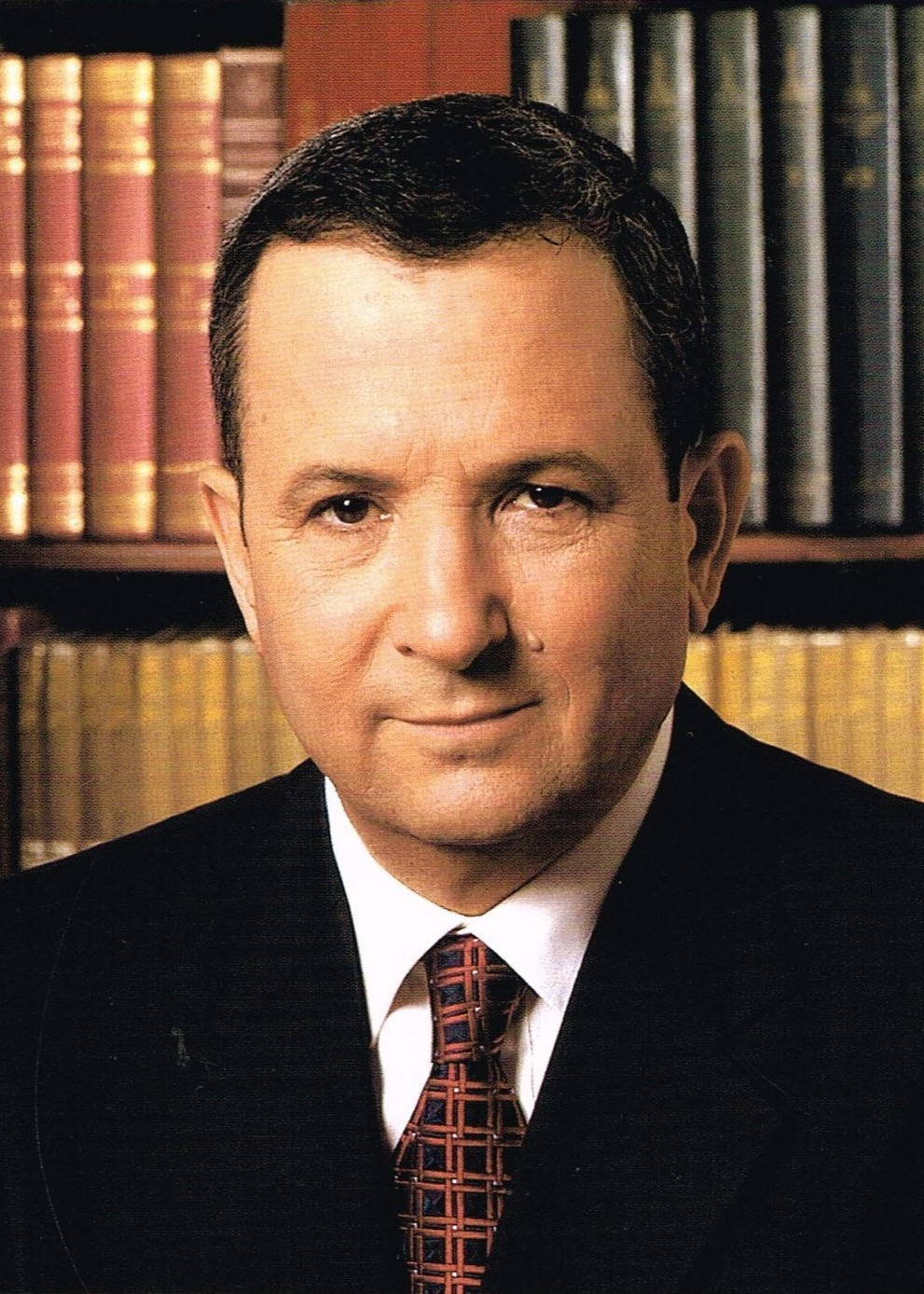
- Official portrait, 1999

Prime Minister of Israel
- In office 6 July 1999 – 7 March 2001
- President: Ezer Weizman; Moshe Katsav
- Deputy: Yitzhak Mordechai; David Levy; Binyamin Ben-Eliezer
- Preceded by: Benjamin Netanyahu
- Succeeded by: Ariel Sharon

Leader of the Opposition
- De facto 1 July 1997 – 6 July 1999
- Prime Minister: Benjamin Netanyahu
- Preceded by: Shimon Peres
- Succeeded by: Ariel Sharon

Minister of Defense
- In office 18 June 2007 – 18 March 2013
- Prime Minister: Ehud Olmert; Benjamin Netanyahu
- Deputy: Matan Vilnai
- Preceded by: Amir Peretz
- Succeeded by: Moshe Ya'alon
- In office 6 July 1999 – 7 March 2001
- Prime Minister: Himself
- Deputy: Efraim Sneh
- Preceded by: Moshe Arens
- Succeeded by: Binyamin Ben-Eliezer

Minister of Foreign Affairs
- In office 22 November 1995 – 18 June 1996
- Prime Minister: Shimon Peres
- Deputy: Eli Dayan
- Preceded by: Shimon Peres
- Succeeded by: David Levy

Chief of General Staff
- In office 1 April 1991 – 1 January 1995
- President: Chaim Herzog; Ezer Weizman
- Prime Minister: Yitzhak Shamir; Yitzhak Rabin
- Deputy: Amnon Lipkin-Shahak; Matan Vilnai
- Minister: Moshe Arens; Yitzhak Rabin
- Preceded by: Dan Shomron
- Succeeded by: Amnon Lipkin-Shahak

Member of the Knesset
- In office 24 February 2009 – 5 February 2013
- In office 17 June 1996 – 9 March 2001

Personal details
- Born: Ehud Brog; 12 February 1942 (age 84) Mishmar HaSharon, Mandatory Palestine
- Party: Israel Democratic
- Other political affiliations: Labor Party (until 2011); Independence (2011–2012); Independent (2012–2019)
- Spouses: Nava Cohen (m. 1968; div. 2003); Nili Priel (m. 2007)
- Children: 3
- Education: Hebrew University of Jerusalem (BSc); Stanford University (MS)
- Profession: Military officer
- Awards: Medal of Distinguished Service; Tzalash (4); Legion of Merit; DoD Medal for Distinguished Public Service

Military service
- Branch: Israeli Defense Forces
- Service years: 1959–1995
- Rank: Rav Aluf (Lieutenant general)
- Unit: Sayeret Matkal
- Commands: Chief of General Staff; Deputy Chief of General Staff; Central Command; Military Intelligence Directorate; Sayeret Matkal
- Wars / operations: Six-Day War; Yom Kippur War; Entebbe raid

Ehud Barak (Hebrew: אֵהוּד בָּרָק [eˈhud baˈʁak]; born Ehud Brog; 12 February 1942) is an Israeli former general and politician who served as the prime minister of Israel from 1999 to 2001. He was leader of the Labor Party between 1997 and 2001 and between 2007 and 2011. He was also Minister of Defense from 2007 to 2013.

Born in kibbutz Mishmar Hasharon, Barak is the eldest of four sons; his maternal grandparents were murdered in the Holocaust. He graduated in physics and mathematics from the Hebrew University of Jerusalem and later obtained a master's in engineering-economic systems from Stanford University.

Barak's military career in the Israel Defense Forces (IDF) began in 1959, spanning 35 years and culminating in his appointment as Chief of the General Staff in 1991, serving until 1995. His military tenure is noted for his leadership in several operations, including "Operation Isotope" in 1972, the covert 1973 Israeli raid in Lebanon, and the 1976 Entebbe raid. A lieutenant general, Barak shares with two others the honor of being the most highly decorated soldier in Israel's history.

In politics, his career began with his appointment as interior minister in 1995 under Prime Minister Yitzhak Rabin. Following Rabin's assassination, he served as Minister of Foreign Affairs in Shimon Peres' government. Barak was elected to the Knesset on the Labor Party list in 1996 and subsequently was elected Labor Party leader in 1997. Barak served as Israel's most recent left-wing Prime Minister from 1999 to 2001. His tenure was marked by significant events, including the decision to form a coalition with the Orthodox party Shas, the withdrawal of Israeli forces from Southern Lebanon in 2000, and participation in the 2000 Camp David Summit aimed at resolving the Israeli–Palestinian conflict. Barak's government faced challenges, notably the protests in October 2000.

After defeat in the 2001 Israeli prime ministerial election, he left politics and engaged in international business and advisory roles. He made a political comeback in 2005, attempting to regain leadership in the Labor Party, and later served as defense minister − where he led Operation Cast Lead in 2008–09 − and deputy prime minister under Ehud Olmert and then in Benjamin Netanyahu's second government between 2007 and 2013. His decision to form the Independence party in 2011 marked a shift in his politics, influencing the dynamics within the Netanyahu government. Despite retiring from politics in 2012, he attempted another comeback, running in the September 2019 Israeli legislative election as the leader of Israel Democratic Party − a new party he formed. His party merged with others to form an alliance called the Democratic Union, but it did not win enough seats for him to become a member of the Knesset. Outside of his political and military career, Barak has accumulated wealth through business endeavors and investments; his net worth is estimated to be $10–15 million.

== Early life and family ==
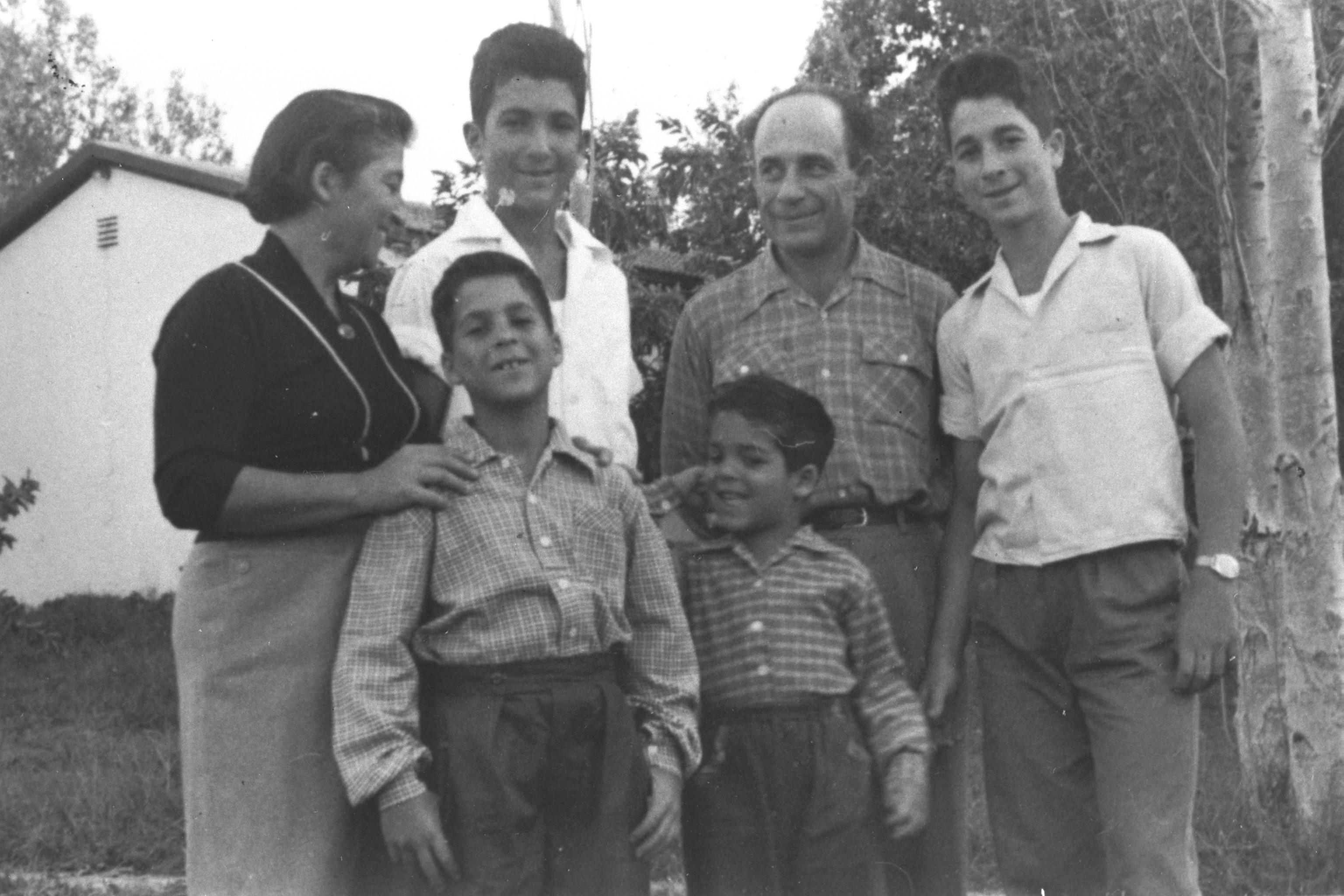
Barak (behind, second from left) with his family in 1964

Ehud Barak was born on kibbutz Mishmar HaSharon in what was then Mandatory Palestine. He is the eldest of four sons of Esther (née Godin; 25 June 1914 – 12 August 2013) and Yisrael Mendel Brog (24 August 1910 – 8 February 2002).

His paternal grandparents, Frieda and Reuven Brog, were murdered in Pušalotas (Pushelat) in northern Lithuania (then ruled by the Russian Empire) in 1912, leaving his father orphaned at the age of two. Barak's maternal grandparents, Elka and Shmuel Godin, died at the Treblinka extermination camp during the Holocaust.

Ehud hebraized his family name from "Brog" to "Barak" in 1972. It was during his military service that he met his future wife, Nava (née Cohen, born 8 April 1947 in Tiberias). They had three daughters together: Michal (born 9 August 1970), Yael (born 23 October 1974) and Anat (born 16 October 1981). He has grandchildren. Barak divorced Nava in August 2003. On 30 July 2007, Barak married Nili Priel (born 25 April 1944) in a small ceremony in his private residence. In his spare time, Barak enjoys reading works by writers such as Johann Wolfgang von Goethe, and he is a classical pianist, with many years of study behind him. His second cousin, Ronald Barak, is an American Olympic gymnast.

Barak earned his bachelor's degree in physics and mathematics from the Hebrew University of Jerusalem in 1968, and his master's degree in engineering-economic systems in 1978 from Stanford University, California.

== Military career ==
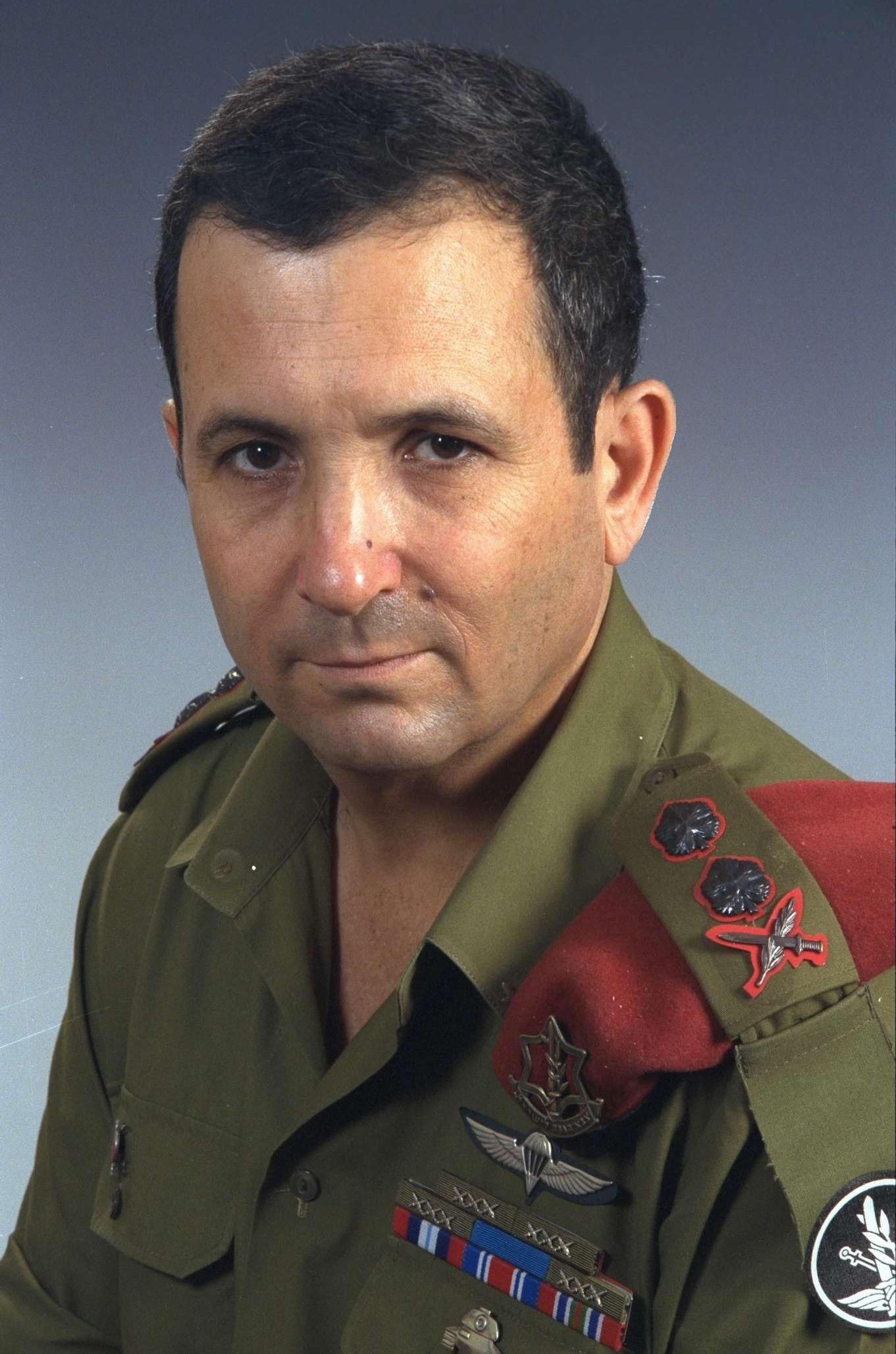
Ehud Barak as Chief of Staff of the Israel Defense Forces

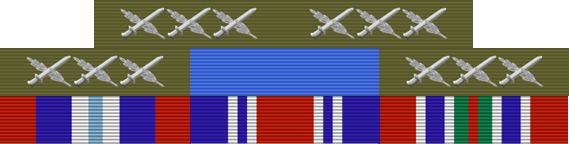
Citations and war ribbons of Ehud Barak

Barak joined the Israel Defense Forces (IDF) in 1959. He served in the IDF for 35 years, rising to the position of Chief of the General Staff and the rank of Rav Aluf (Lieutenant-General), the highest in the Israeli military. During his service as a commando in the elite Sayeret Matkal, Barak led several highly acclaimed operations, such as: "Operation Isotope", the mission to free the hostages on board the hijacked Sabena Flight 571 at Lod Airport in 1972; the covert 1973 Israeli raid in Lebanon in Beirut, in which he was disguised as a woman to kill members of the Palestine Liberation Organization; Barak was also a key architect of the June 1976 Entebbe raid, another rescue mission to free the hostages of the Air France aircraft hijacked by terrorists and forced to land at the Entebbe Airport in Uganda. These highly acclaimed operations, along with Operation Bayonet, led to the dismantling of Palestinian terrorist cell Black September. It has been alluded that Barak also masterminded the Tunis Raid on 16 April 1988, in which PLO leader Abu Jihad was killed.

During the Yom Kippur War, Barak commanded an improvised regiment of tanks which, among other things, helped rescue paratrooper battalion 890, commanded by Yitzhak Mordechai, which was suffering heavy losses in the Battle of the Chinese Farm. He went on to command the 401st armored brigade and the 611st "Pillar of Fire" and 252nd "Sinai" divisions, before his appointment to head the IDF's Planning Directorate. Barak also participated in the Siege of Beirut, overseeing it from Beirut International Airport. Barak later served as head of Aman, the Military Intelligence Directorate (1983–85), head of Central Command (1986–87) and Deputy Chief of the General Staff (1987–91). He served as Chief of the General Staff between 1 April 1991 and 1 January 1995. During this period he implemented the first Oslo Accords and participated in the negotiations towards the Israel–Jordan peace treaty.

Barak was awarded the Medal of Distinguished Service and four Chief of Staff citations (Tzalash HaRamatkal) for courage and operational excellence. These five decorations make him the most decorated soldier in Israeli history (jointly with close friend Nechemya Cohen). In 1992 he was awarded the Legion of Merit (Commander) by the United States. In 2012, he was again awarded by the United States with the Department of Defense Medal for Distinguished Public Service.

== Political career ==
On 7 July 1995, Barak was appointed Minister of Internal Affairs by Yitzhak Rabin. When Shimon Peres formed a new government following Rabin's assassination in November 1995, Barak was made Minister of Foreign Affairs (1995–96). He was elected to the Knesset on the Labor Party list in 1996, and served as a member of the Knesset Foreign Affairs and Defense Committee. In a party leadership election held after Peres' defeat in the 1996 election for Prime Minister, Barak was elected leader of the Labor Party in June 1997.

=== Prime Minister of Israel ===
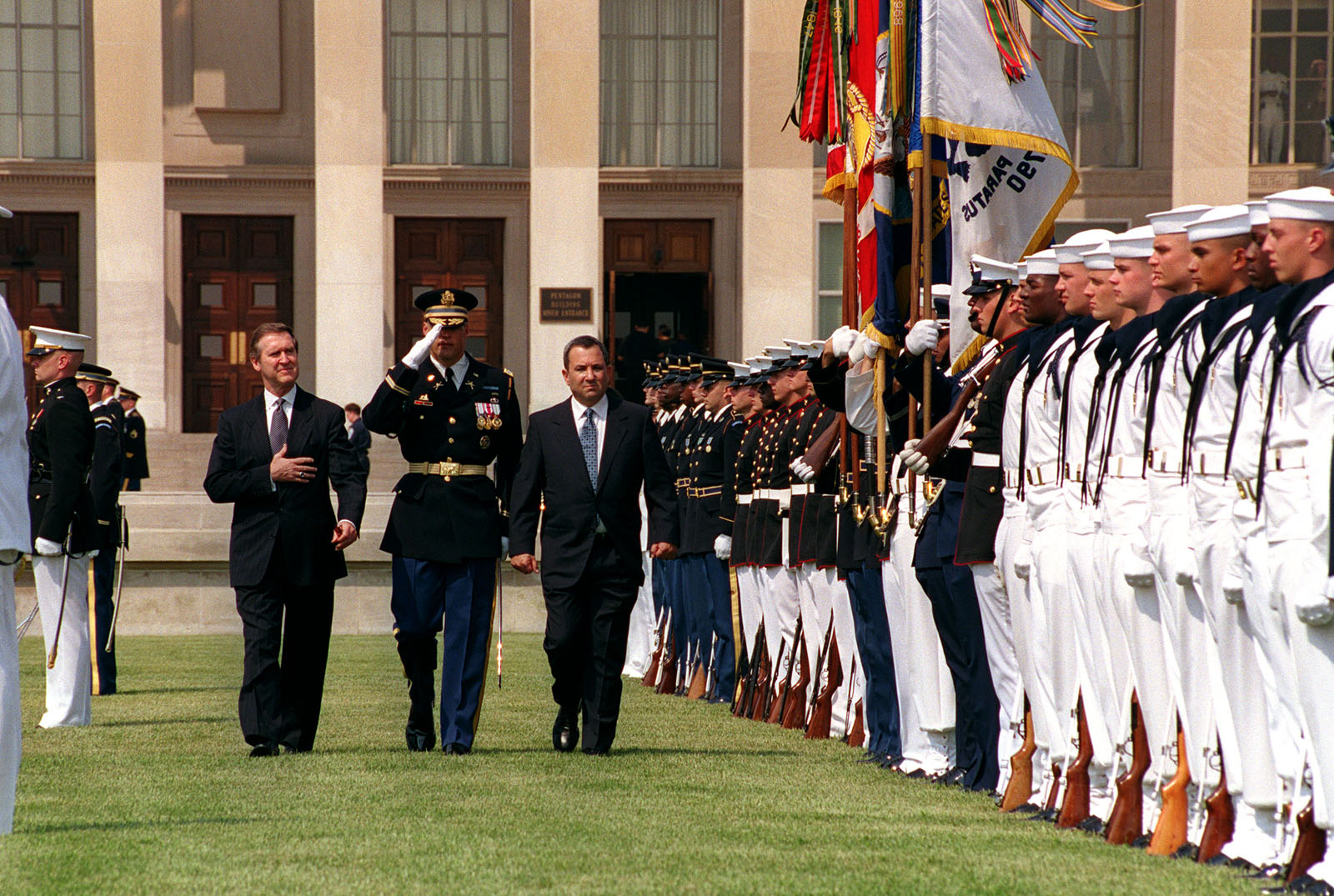
Barak at the Pentagon (1999)

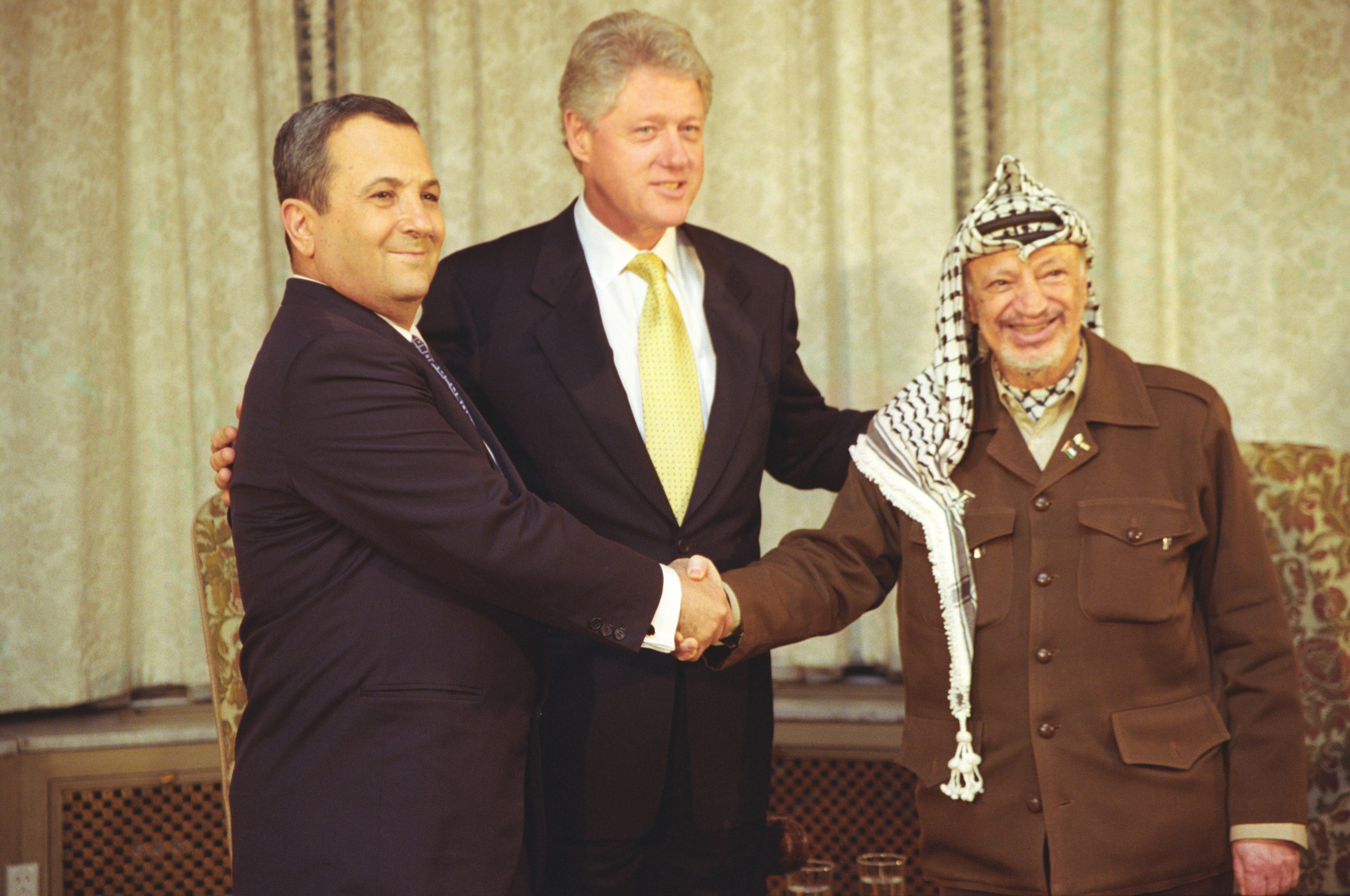
Ehud Barak shaking hands with Yasser Arafat, joined by President Bill Clinton (1999)

In the 1999 Prime Ministerial election, Barak beat Benjamin Netanyahu by a wide margin. However, he sparked controversy by deciding to form a coalition with the ultra-Orthodox party Shas, who had won an unprecedented 17 seats in the 120-seat Knesset. Shas grudgingly agreed to Barak's terms that they eject their leader Aryeh Deri, a convicted felon, and enact reform to "clean up" in-party corruption. Consequentially, the left wing Meretz party quit the coalition after they failed to agree on the powers to be given to a Shas deputy minister in the Ministry of Education.

In 1999 Barak gave a campaign promise to end Israel's 22-year-long occupation of Southern Lebanon within a year. On 24 May 2000 Israel withdrew from Southern Lebanon. On 7 October, three Israeli soldiers were killed in a border raid by Hezbollah and their bodies were subsequently captured. The bodies of these soldiers, along with the living Elhanan Tenenbaum, were eventually exchanged for Lebanese captives in 2004.

The Barak government resumed peace negotiations with the PLO, stating that "Every attempt [by the State of Israel] to keep hold of this area [the West Bank and Gaza] as one political entity leads, necessarily, to either a nondemocratic or a non-Jewish state. Because if the Palestinians vote, then it is a binational state, and if they don't vote it is an apartheid state." As part of these negotiations, Barak took part in the Camp David 2000 Summit which was meant finally to resolve the Israeli–Palestinian conflict but failed. Barak also allowed Foreign Minister Shlomo Ben-Ami to attend the Taba Summit with the leadership of the Palestinian Authority, after his government had fallen.

=== Domestic issues ===
On 22 August 1999, Barak appointed the Tal committee which dealt with the controversial issue of ultra-Orthodox Jews' exemption from military service. Following the failure of the Camp David summit with Arafat and Bill Clinton in the summer of 2000, when the original seven-year mandate of the PNA expired, and just after Israel pulled its last troops out of southern Lebanon in May 2000, the October 2000 riots led to the killing of twelve Israeli Arabs and one Palestinian by Israel Police and one Jewish civilian by Israeli Arabs.

=== Resignation ===
In 2001, Barak called an election for prime minister. In the contest, he was defeated by Likud leader Ariel Sharon, and subsequently resigned as Labor leader and from the Knesset.

=== In private life (2001–2007) ===
Barak left Israel to work as a senior advisor with United States–based Electronic Data Systems. He also partnered with a private equity company focused on "security-related" work.

In 2005, Barak announced his return to Israeli politics, and ran for leadership of the Labor Party in November. However, in light of his weak poll showings, Barak dropped out of the race early and declared his support for veteran statesman Shimon Peres. Following his failed attempt to maintain leadership of the Labor Party, Barak became a partner of the Pennsylvania-based investment company SCP Private Equity Partners. He also established a company "Ehud Barak Limited" which is thought to have made over NIS 30 million.

After Peres lost the race to Amir Peretz and left the Labor party, Barak announced he would stay at the party, despite his shaky relationship with its newly elected leader. He declared, however, that he would not run for a spot on the Labor party's Knesset list for the March 2006 elections. Barak's attempt to return to a prominent role in Israel politics seemed to have failed. However, Peretz's hold on the Labor leadership proved unexpectedly shaky as he was badly damaged by negative views of his performance as Defense Minister during the 2006 Lebanon War, which was seen as something less than a success in Israel.

=== Return to politics ===
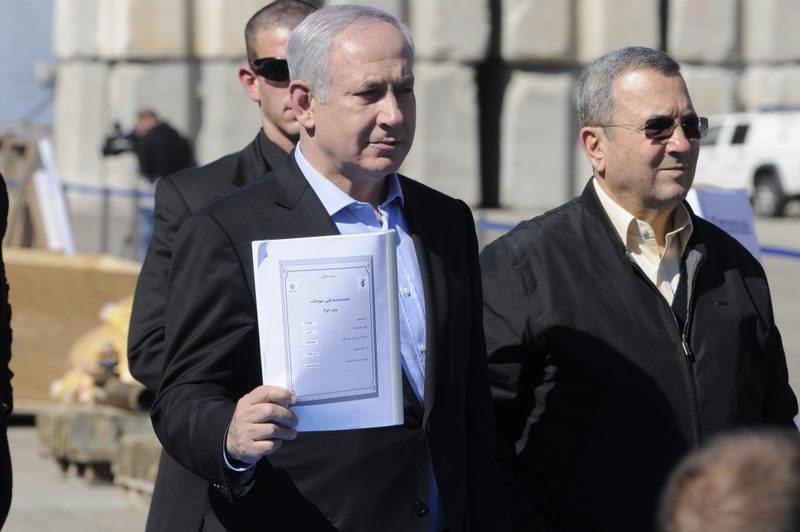
Israeli Minister of Defense Ehud Barak, with Prime Minister Benjamin Netanyahu after the Victoria Affair, March 2011

In January 2007, Barak launched a bid to recapture the leadership of the Labor party in a letter acknowledging "mistakes" and "inexperience" during his tenure as prime minister. In early March 2007, a poll of Labor Party primary voters put Barak ahead of all other opponents, including Peretz. In the first round of voting, on 28 May 2007, he gained 39% of the votes, more than his two closest rivals, but not enough to win the election.

As a result, Barak faced a runoff against the second-place finisher, Ami Ayalon, on 12 June 2007, which he won by a narrow margin.

Barak has been critical of what he sees as racist sentiments that have recently been expressed by some Israeli rabbis and rebbetzins; he views such statements as a threat to Israeli unity and that they may lead Israeli society into a "dark and dangerous place".

==== Defense minister and head of Ha'Avoda (2007–2011) ====
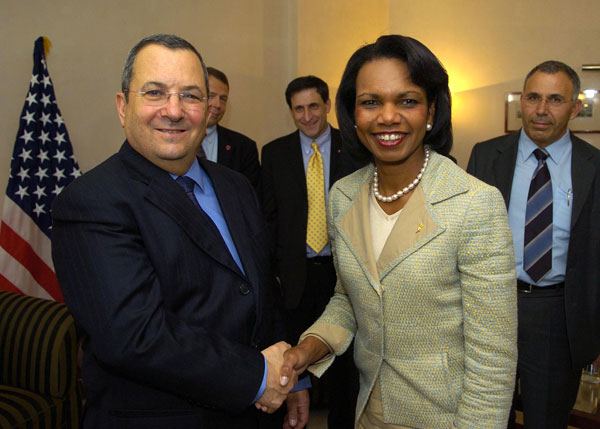
Ehud Barak and Condoleezza Rice (2007)

After winning back the leadership of the Labor Party, Barak was sworn in as minister of defense on 18 June 2007, as part of Prime Minister Olmert's cabinet reshuffle. However, on 1 July 2007, Barak led a successful effort in the Labor central committee to stipulate that Labor would leave the government coalition if Olmert did not resign by September or October 2007. The Winograd Commission would publish its final report on the performance of the Israel Defense Forces and its civilian leadership. The preliminary Winograd report, released in early 2007, laid most of the blame on Olmert for poorly planning, executing, and reviewing war strategies in the 2006 conflict against Hezbollah.

From December 2008 to January 2009, Barak led the Israel Defense Forces through Operation Cast Lead in his capacity as minister of defence.

Labor won only 13 out of the 120 Knesset seats in the 2009 elections, making them the fourth largest party. Barak and other Labor officials initially stated they would not take part in the next government. However, over the objections of some in the Labor party, in March 2009, Barak reached an agreement under which Labor joined the governing coalition led by Benjamin Netanyahu. Barak retained his position as Defense Minister.

==== Leaving Ha'Avoda and minister of defense (2011–2013) ====
In January 2011, Labor Party leader Barak formed a breakaway party, Independence, which enabled him to maintain his loyal Labor's MK faction within Netanyahu's government, and prevented the departure of Labor party as a whole from Netanyahu's coalition-government. Labor previously threatened to force Barak to do so. After Barak's move, Netanyahu was able to maintain a majority of 66 MK (out of 120 in the Knesset), previously having 74 MKs within his majority coalition.

In February 2011, Barak attended a ceremony at the UN for the International Day of Commemoration in memory of the victims of the Holocaust. Barak told the UN General Assembly that "an independent, strong, thriving and peaceful State of Israel is the vengeance of the dead."

Barak's Independence party was due to run in a legislative election, but decided not to in 2012, and retired from politics. Barak planned to quit since Operation Pillar of Defense but postponed it until later that year.

Barak stated during an American television interview that he would "probably" strive for nuclear weapons if he were in Iran's position, adding "I don't delude myself that they are doing it just because of Israel". This comment has been criticized and compared to Barak's comment in 1998 during a television interview when he said that if he were a Palestinian he would probably have joined one of the terror organizations.

==== 2019 failed return to political life ====
On 26 June 2019, Barak announced his return to politics and his intention to form a new party named the Israel Democratic Party, intending to challenge Netanyahu in the September 2019 Israeli legislative election. The party ran with Meretz and other parties in the Democratic Union alliance, which received five seats. Barak himself did not enter the Knesset.

In October 2026, Ehud Barak, levelled accusations against incumbent Prime Minister Benjamin Netanyahu, alleging that he was "laying the groundwork" for a war intended to delay the general elections set for October 27, 2026. Speaking in an interview with Channel 12, Barak stated: "Netanyahu is preparing the infrastructure to go to war in a way that would postpone the elections."

Barak's criticism of Netanyahu was notably harsh. He asserted that Netanyahu "lies as he breathes, as he eats French fries, and as he leaves a restaurant without paying." He further declared: "We must do everything to remove him from power on Oct. 27, once and for all."

== Relationship with Jeffrey Epstein ==
Barak maintained a relationship with convicted sex trafficker Jeffrey Epstein. According to Barak, they first met in 2003. Barak regularly stayed at Epstein’s apartment in New York.

In 2015, Barak invested in Reporty, a tech startup that developed video streaming and geolocation software and later changed its name to Carbyne. A large portion of the funds invested by Barak was supplied by Jeffrey Epstein. For Epstein's 63rd birthday in 2016 a number of letters written for the occasion by high profile individuals were compiled as a birthday gift; among these were a letter from Barak and his wife. In 2023, it was revealed that Barak had visited Epstein around 30 times from 2013 to 2017 and had also flown on his jet. Barak denied any wrongdoing. Barak stated that his wife and security guards were with him on the two occasions he flew with Epstein on private planes, and also during a three-hour stay at Epstein's home in the U.S. Virgin Islands, where he said the only other people he saw were Epstein and maintenance staff.

According to emails, Epstein invited Barak to meet Peter Thiel, a former director of Israeli signals intelligence, and two people in Vladimir Putin's circle; former Russian Deputy Minister of Economic Development Sergei Belyakov, and Viktor Vekselberg. Epstein arranged for Barak to meet Thiel (they had met once, in Davos), presumably to discuss geopolitics, in New York on 9 June 2014.

While scheduling the meeting with Thiel, Barak also tried to arrange to meet Putin's ally Viktor Vekselberg early in June 2014. An email sent in April 2015 shows that Barak asked Epstein for his opinion on Vekselberg-backed Fifth Dimension, a startup which later shut down after being sanctioned in 2018 by the US for alleged election meddling.

Barak said that he was ending his business relationship with Epstein after Epstein was re-arrested in July 2019.

== Financial assets ==
In an interview with Haaretz reported in January 2015, Barak was asked to explain the source of his "big" capital, with which he "bought 5 apartments and connected them," and by which he "lives in a giant rental apartment in a luxury high rise." Barak said he currently earns more than a $1 million a year, and that from 2001 to 2007, he also earned more than a $1 million every year, from giving lectures and from consulting for hedge funds. Barak also said he made millions of dollars more from his investments in Israeli real estate properties.

In the interview, Barak was asked whether he is a lobbyist who earns a living from "opening doors". The interviewer stated "You have arrived recently at the Kazakhstan despot Nazarbayev and the president of Ghana. You are received immediately." Barak confirmed that he has been received by these heads of state but denied earning money from opening doors for international business deals for Israeli and foreign corporations, and said he does not see any ethical or moral problems in his business activities. He further said there is no logic to demand of him, after "the natural process in democracy has ended" to not utilize the tools he accumulated in his career to secure his financial future. When asked if his financial worth is $10–15 million, Barak said "I'm not far from there."

== Awards and decorations ==

	Chief of Staff Citation	
Chief of Staff Citation	Chief of Staff Citation	Chief of Staff Citation
Six-Day War Ribbon	War of Attrition Ribbon	Yom Kippur War Ribbon
First Lebanon War Ribbon	Medal of Distinguished Service	Commander of the Legion of Merit

== See also ==
- List of Israel's Chiefs of the General Staff
- List of wartime cross-dressers

== Bibliography ==
- Bregman, Ahron Elusive Peace: How the Holy Land Defeated America.
- Clinton, Bill (2005). My Life. Vintage. ISBN 1-4000-3003-X.
- Dromi, Uri (5 November 2005). "Still craving peace 10 years after Rabin". New Straits Times, p. 20.

Political offices
Preceded by Benjamin Netanyahu	Prime Minister of Israel; 1999–2001	Succeeded by Ariel Sharon
Party political offices
Preceded by Shimon Peres	Leader of the Israeli Labor Party; 1997–2001	Succeeded by Benjamin Ben-Eliezer
Preceded by Amir Peretz	Leader of the Israeli Labor Party; 2007–2011	Succeeded by Shelly Yachimovich
