= 1980 Israeli Labor Party leadership election =

Israeli Labor Party leadership election

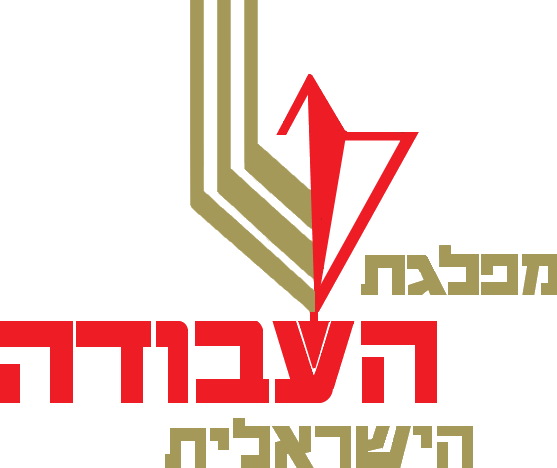
- 18 December 1980

vote by delegates to party convention
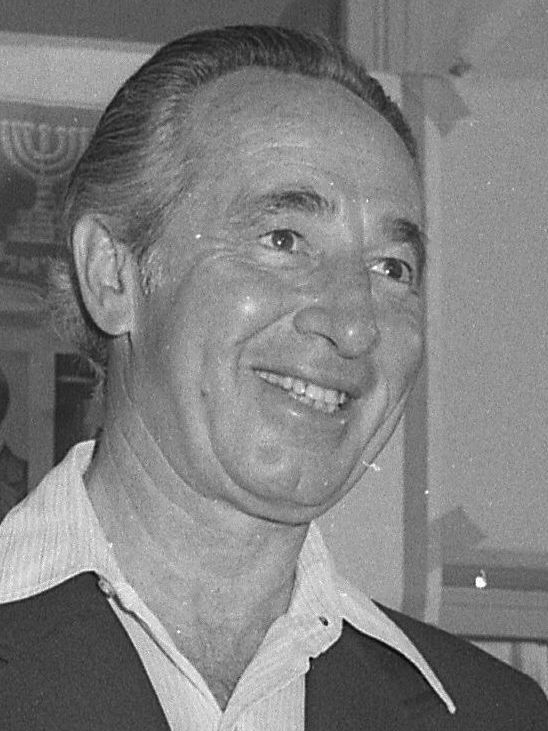

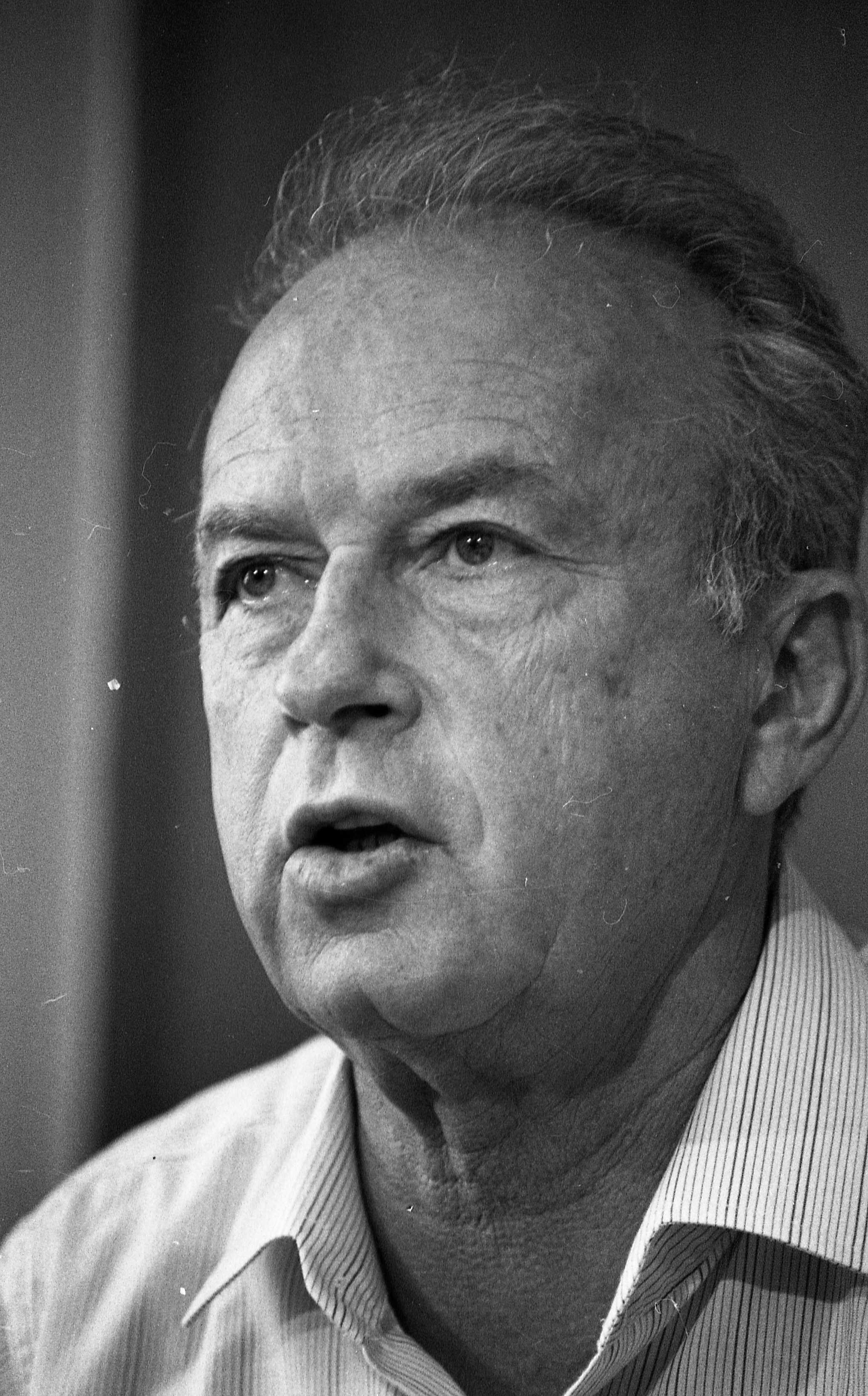
Candidate	Shimon Peres	Yitzhak Rabin
Popular vote	2,123	875
Percentage	70.81%	29.19%
Leader before election
Shimon Peres
Elected Leader
Shimon Peres

The 1980 Israeli Labor Party leadership election was held on 18 December 1980. It saw the delegates to the party's convention reelect Shimon Peres as the party's leader. Peres defeated Yitzhak Rabin.

This was the third of four leadership contests in which Rabin and Peres faced each other (following the 1974 and February 1977 and preceding the 1992 leadership elections).

== Background ==
The vote took place in advance of the 1981 Knesset election. At the time of the leadership election, Labor was broadly anticipated, per opinion polls, to have a strong performance over rival Likud in that election.

Additionally, prior to his death from a sudden heart attack in late February 1980, Yigal Allon had been campaigning to unseat Peres as party leader, but his prospects of winning were seen as weak. Allon was a political rival of Peres.

== Candidates ==
- Shimon Peres, incumbent leader since 1977, member of the Knesset since 1959, former minister of defense (1974–1977), former Minister of Information (1974), former Minister of Transportation (1970–1974), and former Minister of Immigration and Absorption (1969–1970)
- Yitzhak Rabin, former leader (1974–1977), former prime minister (1974–1977), member of the Knesset since 1973, former Minister of Labour (1974), former ambassador to the United States (1968–1973), and former Chief of the General Staff (1964–1968)

== Campaign ==
Peres was expected to secure a comfortable reelection as party leader. Rabin attempted to persuade the delegates comprising the electorate that he was more popular than Peres, and therefore presented the party with a greater chance at leading in the 1981 Knesset election.

== Voting procedure ==
The election's electorate was the 3,101 delegates to the party's convention.

== Results ==
1980 Israeli Labor Party leadership election
Candidate	Votes	%
Shimon Peres (incumbent)	2,123	70.81
Yitzhak Rabin	875	29.19
Total votes	2,998	100
