= February 1977 Israeli Labor Party leadership election =

Israeli Labor Party leadership election

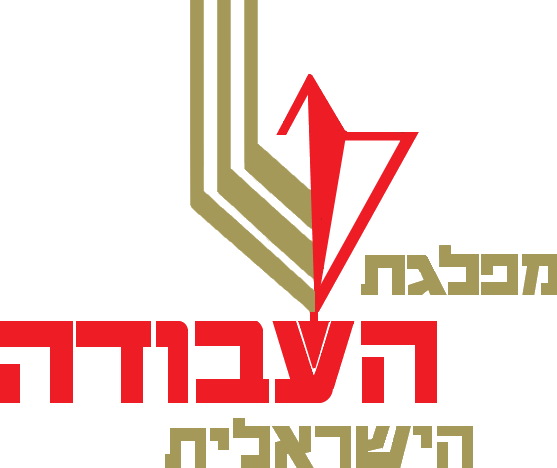
- 23 February 1977

vote by delegates to party convention
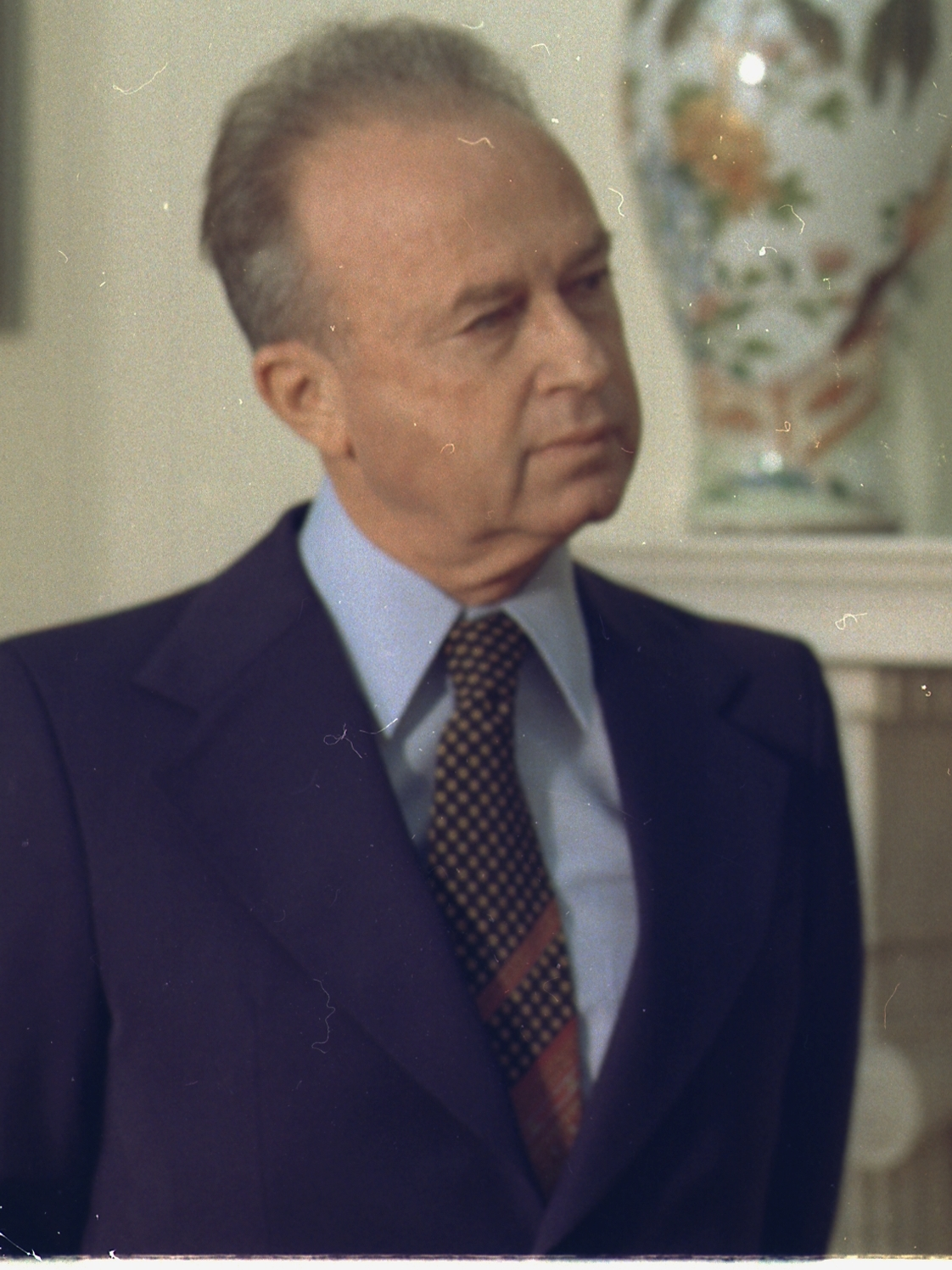

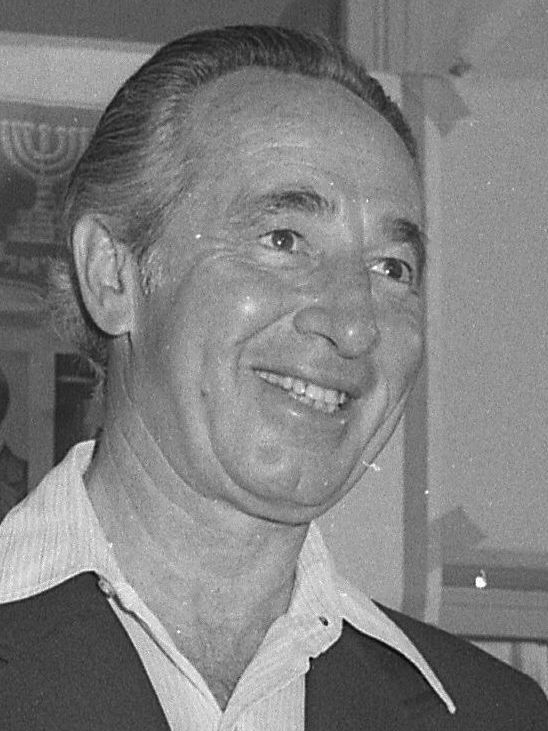
Candidate	Yitzhak Rabin	Shimon Peres
Popular vote	1,445	1,404
Percentage	50.72%	49.28%
Leader before election
Yitzhak Rabin
Elected Leader
Yitzhak Rabin

The February 1977 Israeli Labor Party leadership election was held on 23 February 1977. It saw the delegates to the party's convention reelect Yitzhak Rabin as the party's leader. Rabin defeated Shimon Peres. It was the second of four leadership contests in which Rabin and Peres faced each other (after the 1974 and followed by the 1980, and 1992 leadership elections).

It had been anticipated that the winner of this leadership election would lead the Israeli Labor Party into the May 17 1977 Knesset election. However, Rabin ultimately announced his resignation before the Knesset election, and Peres was instead selected in an April vote held by the Israeli Labor Party's Central Committee to lead the party into that election.

== Candidates ==
- Shimon Peres, member of the Knesset since 1959, Minister of Defense since 1974, former Minister of Information (1974), former Minister of Transportation (1970–1974), and former Minister of Immigration and Absorption (1969–1970)
- Yitzhak Rabin, incumbent leader since 1974, Prime Minister since 1974, member of the Knesset since 1973, former Minister of Labour (1974), former ambassador to the United States (1968–1973), and former Chief of the General Staff (1964–1968)

== Background ==
The race came at a moment when Labor was facing the prospect of seeing its 28-consecutive years of government leadership end, with the right-wing Likud bloc and the centrist Democratic Movement for Change being seen as cutting into the Labor Party's support for the upcoming 1977 Knesset election.

== Campaign ==
The race was a close battle between the incumbent Rabin and Peres, who had faced each other for leadership in the preceding 1974 leadership election.

Rabin and Peres held little policy difference. Peres was seen as slightly to the right of Rabin on domestic matters.

Rabin argued to the electorate that replacing him would divide the party and harm its image, and painted an image of himself as a positive leader for the nation. Peres, on the other hand, argued to the electorate that the Labor Party needed to satisfy the nation's desire for change by choosing a new leader for itself.

Rabin received support from most of his cabinet, as well as Golda Meir, his predecessor as party leader and prime minister. The day before the vote, Rabin pledged to renew efforts to reach a peace agreement with the Arabs.

== Voting procedure ==
The election's electorate was 3,000 delegates to the party's convention, This was the first time that the party selected its leader by a vote of convention delegates, having previously held leadership elections through either a vote by the party's Central Committee or other party agencies. Ahead of the vote, the result leadership election was seen as uncertain in outcome, a departure from previous leadership elections, which were largely a ratification of the already-chosen selection of party bosses.

== Results ==
February 1977 Israeli Labor Party leadership election
Candidate	Votes	%
Yitzhak Rabin (incumbent)	1,445	50.72
Shimon Peres	1,404	49.28
Total votes	2,849	100
