= 1974 Israeli Labor Party leadership election =

Israeli Labor Party leadership election

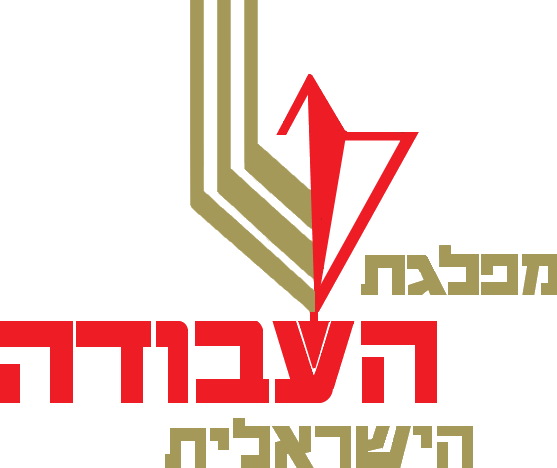
- 23 April 1974

vote by Central Committee of party
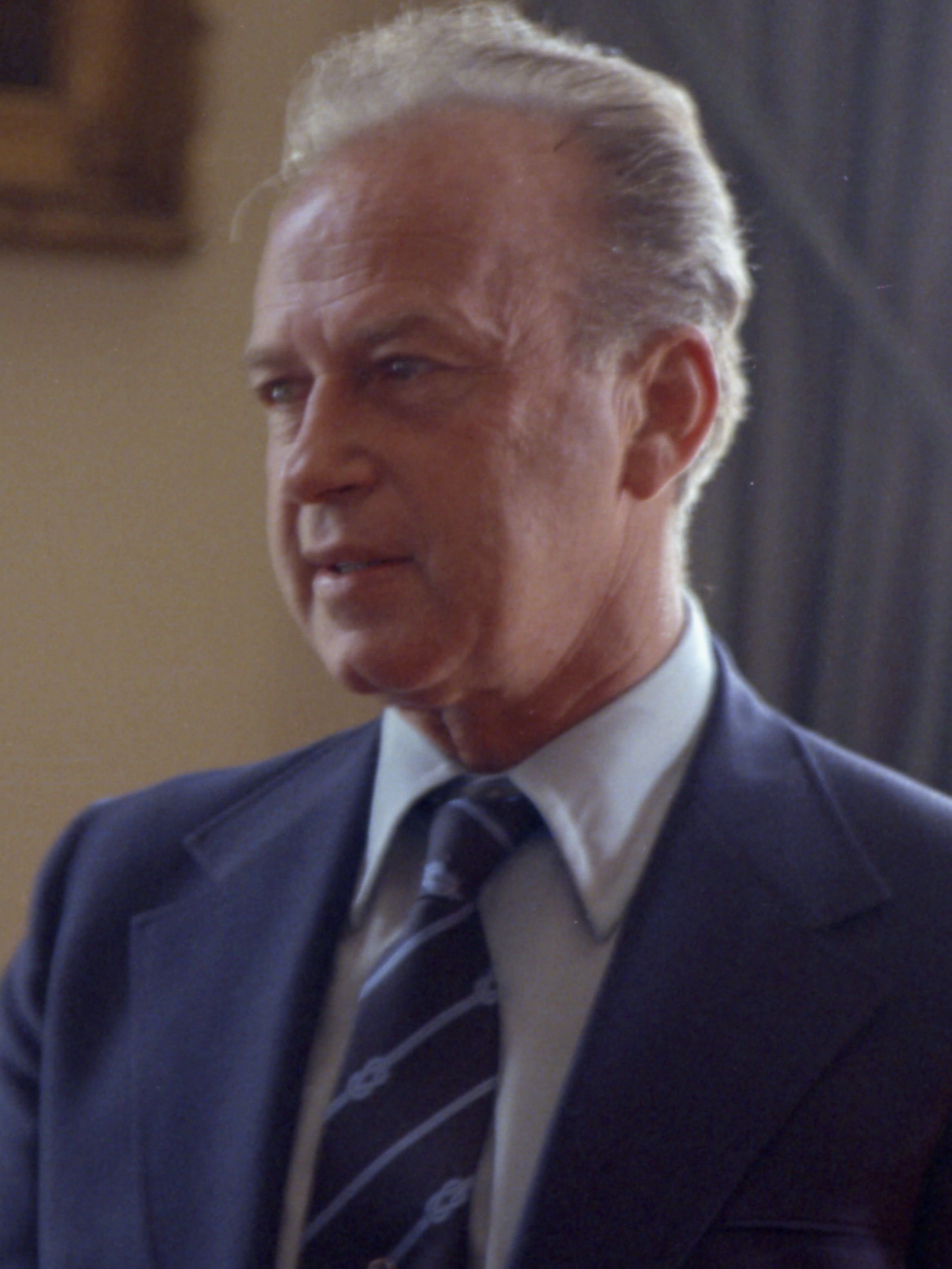

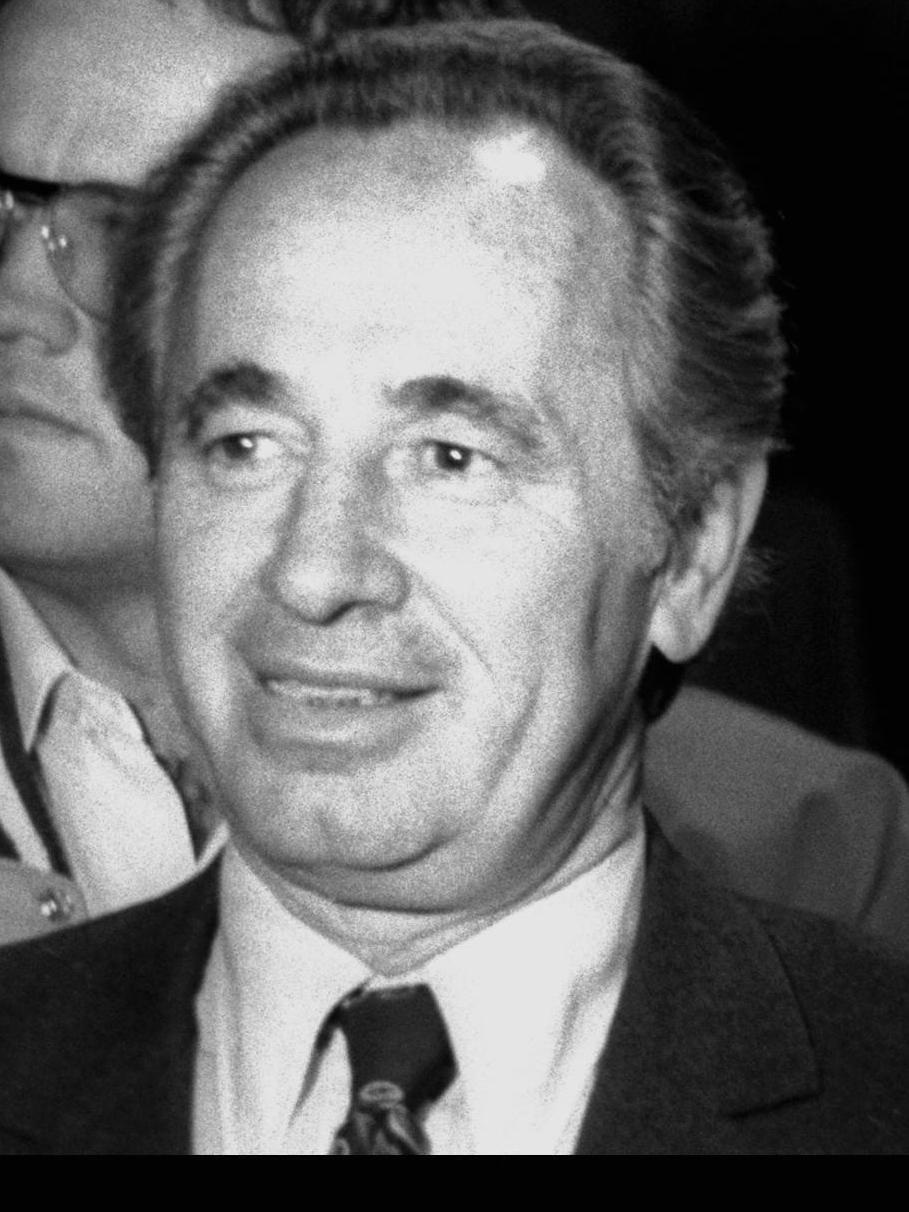
Candidate	Yitzhak Rabin	Shimon Peres
Popular vote	298	254
Percentage	53.99%	46.02%
Leader before election
Golda Meir
Elected Leader
Yitzhak Rabin

The 1974 Israeli Labor Party leadership election was held on 23 April 1974. It saw the party's central committee elect Yitzhak Rabin to succeed Golda Meir as the party's leader. Rabin defeated Shimon Peres. It was the first of four leadership contests in which Rabin and Peres challenged each other (followed by the February 1977, 1980, and 1992 leadership elections).

Rabin was the first sabra (individual that was born in or native to the land where Israel is located) to be elected leader of the Labor Party.

== Background ==
The leadership election took place after Golda Meir was successfully pressured to step down amid public criticism of her government after the Yom Kippur War.

== Candidates ==
- Shimon Peres, member of the Knesset since 1959, Minister of Information since 1974, former Minister of Transportation (1970–1974), and former Minister of Immigration Absorption (1969–1970)
- Yitzhak Rabin, member of the Knesset since 1973, Minister of Labour since 1974, former ambassador to the United States (1968–1973), and former Chief of the General Staff (1964–1968)

In contrast to Peres' lengthy Knesset and Labor Party experience, Rabin had only been a Labor Party member of the Knesset for a few months. Rabin's resume had extensive military background, but little political experience. Rabin was, ultimately, the first Labor Party leader not to have first been a member of the party's leadership ranks. Rabin held the backing of the "Old Guard" of the Labor Party. Nevertheless, Peres managed to receive significant support in the vote.

== Results ==
The election was held by a secret ballot of the party's central committee.

1974 Israeli Labor Party leadership election
Candidate	Votes	%
Yitzhak Rabin	298	53.99
Shimon Peres	254	46.02
Total votes	552	100
