= 1992 Israeli Labor Party leadership election =

Israeli Labor Party leadership election

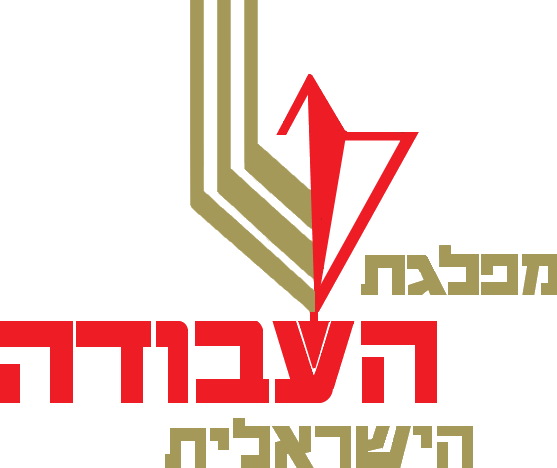
- 20 February 1992

vote by general membership of party
- Turnout: 70.10%
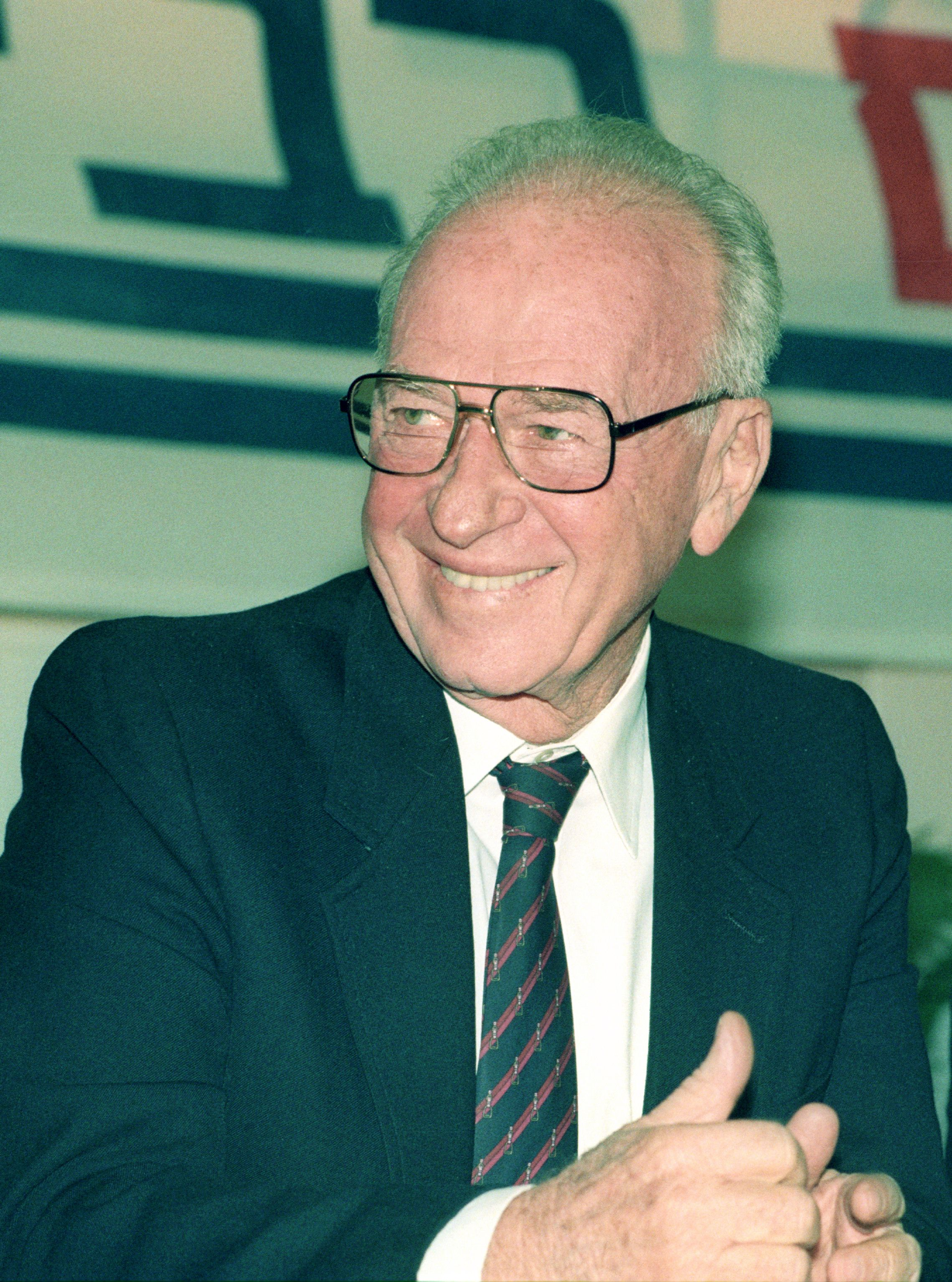

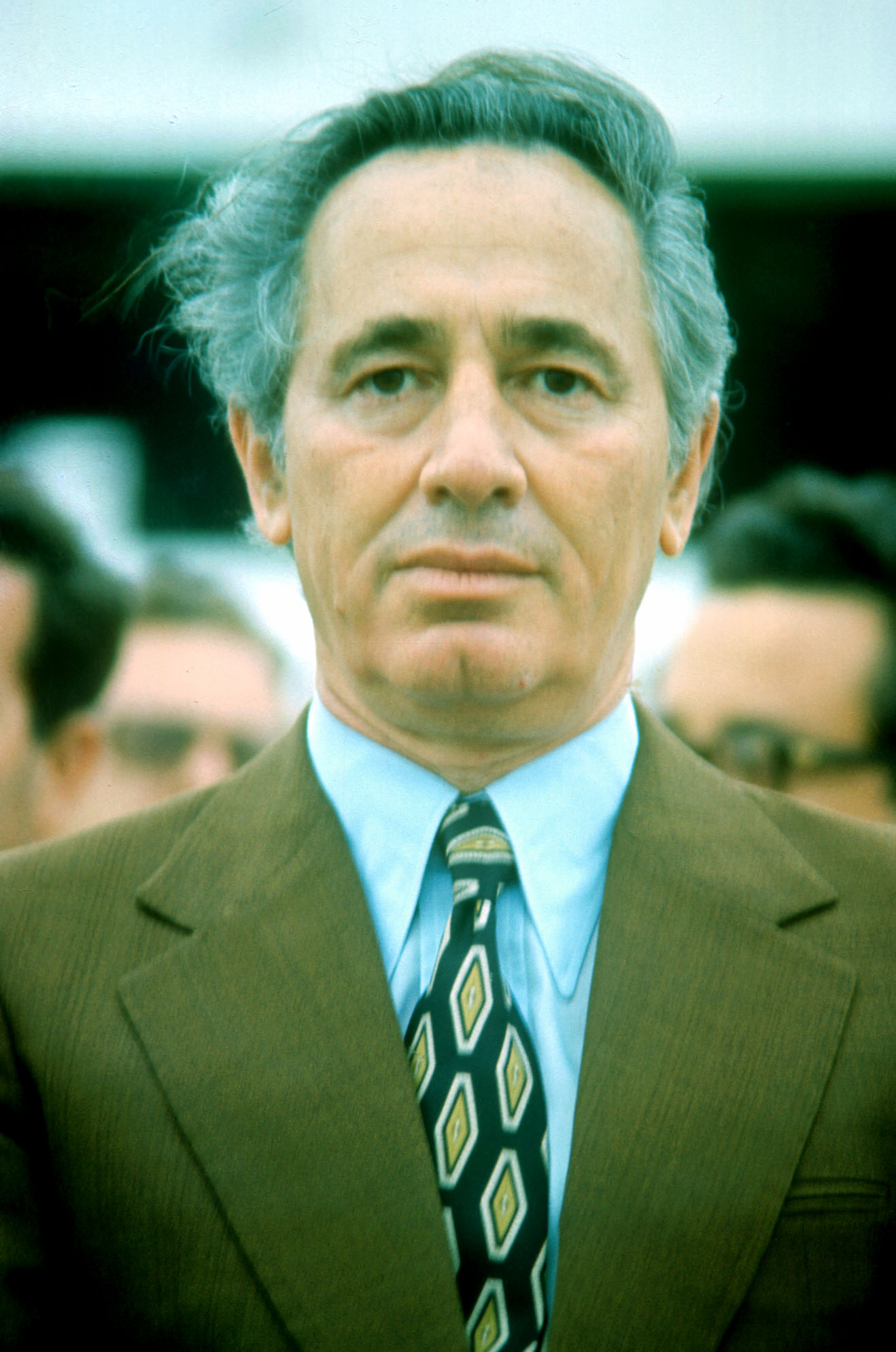

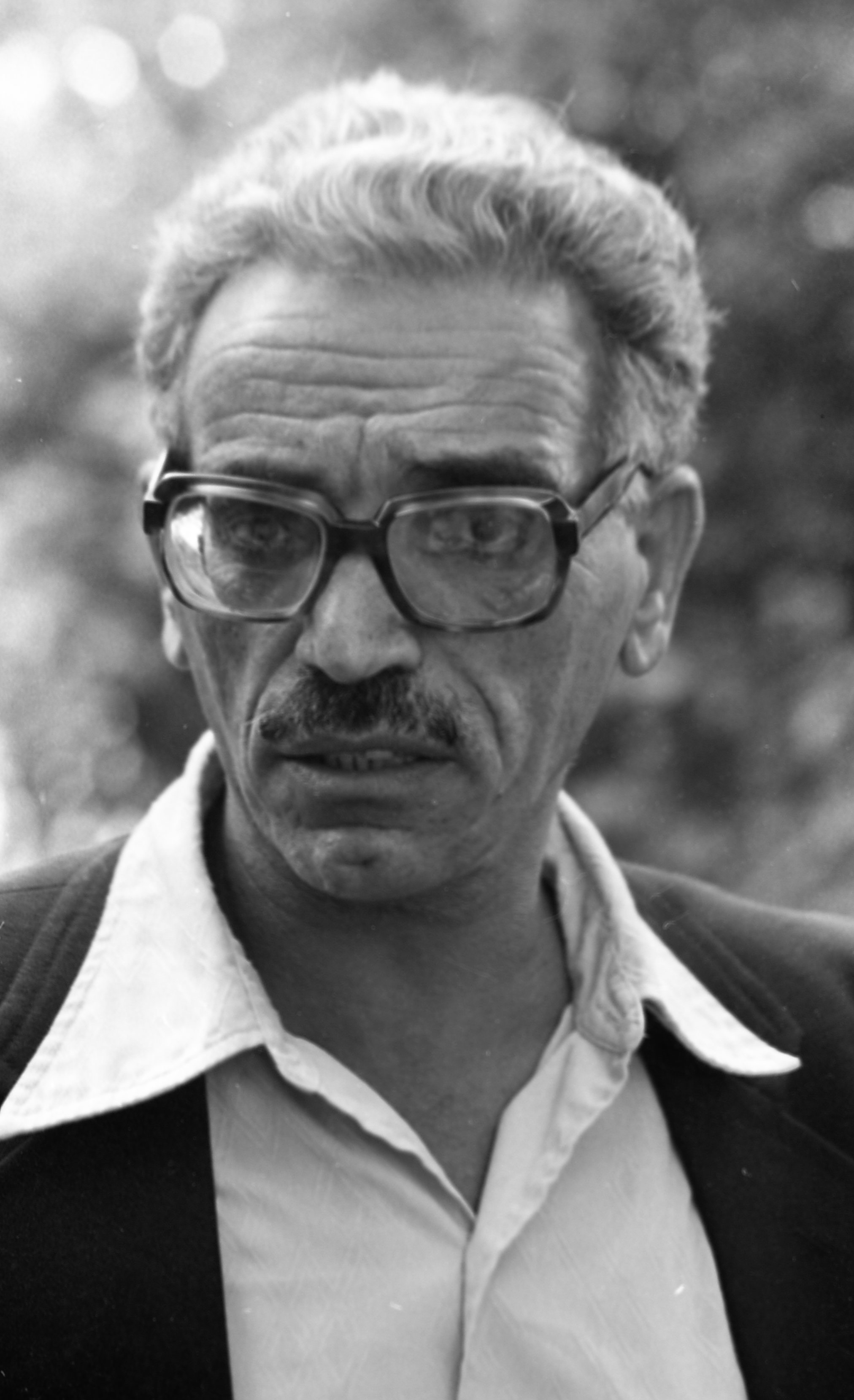

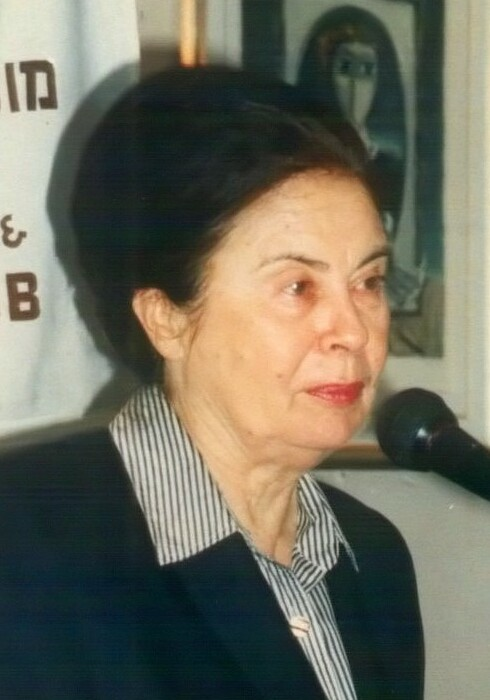
| Candidate | Yitzak Rabin | Shimon Peres |
| Percentage | 40.6% | 34.5% |
| Candidate | Yisrael Kessar | Ora Namir |
| Percentage | 19.0% | 5.5% |
Leader before election
Shimon Peres
Elected Leader
Yitzhak Rabin

The 1992 Israeli Labor Party leadership election was held on 20 February 1992 to elect the leader of the Israeli Labor Party. The winner was Yitzhak Rabin, who defeated incumbent Shimon Peres, as well as Yisrael Kessar and Ora Namir. The leadership election was the first in Israeli history to be open to a party's entire membership.

== Background ==
The election was the first time that the Israeli Labor Party had elected its leader by a vote open to its entire party membership. It was the first party leadership vote of its kind in Israeli history.

Shimon Peres had served as the party's leader since 1977. During his leadership, the party had failed to emerge victorious in four consecutive Knesset elections. Rabin had preceded Peres in the role of the party's leader, before resigning in 1977. This was the fourth (and final) leadership election in which Peresa and Rabin faced each other (following the 1974 and February 1977, and 1980 leadership elections).

In 1990, following the backfiring of "the dirty trick" on Peres and the Labor Party, and once it became evident that Yitzhak Shamir would likely succeed in forming a new government coalition without the Israeli Labor Party, Rabin unsuccessfully sought to convince the party to schedule a leadership election in 1990. A prospective leadership race in 1990 had looked promising to Rabin. Peres was weakened from the backfiring of "the dirty trick", and polling showed Rabin to be the nation's most popular politician. Additionally, many of Peres' longtime backers in the party had begun shifting their support to Rabin. In July 1990, the Labor Party's 120 member Leadership Bureau voted to recommend that the party hold an immediate leadership election. However, one week later, on 22 July 1990, the 1,400 member Labor Party Central Committee voted 54 to 46% against holding an immediate leadership contest. This set the part up to not hold a leadership election until at least the following year, unless the next Knesset election were to have been scheduled earlier than the anticipated 1992. The committee's vote to reject Rabin's push for a 1990 leadership contest was regarded as an upset result.

At the same time that the party's Central Committee decided against holding a leadership election in the year 1990, it became evident that the next leadership election might feature additional (younger) contenders, and not just Peres and Rabin, with both Ora Namir and Moshe Shahal declaring that they intended to run for Labor Party leader. Ultimately, Shahal abandoned his plans.

== Candidates ==
- Yisrael Kessar, head of Histadrut
- Ora Namir, member of the Knesset
- Shimon Peres, incumbent party leader and former prime minister
- Yitzhak Rabin, former prime minister and former Israeli Labor Party leader

== Campaign ==
The race was widely a horserace between Rabin and Peres.

Ahead of the leadership election, polling for the upcoming 1992 Israeli legislative election indicated that the party would fare better in the legislative election under the leadership of Rabin than it would under Peres. Israeli political commentators also widely believed that the party would have a stronger odds of electoral success under Rabin than under Peres. While polling, before the leadership election, had a Likud-led coalition as the likely outcome of the legislative election, polling and the opinions of commentators indicated that, if were Rabin were to become the Labour leader, there would be a strong increase in the chances of Labour taking lead in the legislative election.

Polls showed the leadership election to be very close, with no clear front-runner between Rabin and Peres.

== Result ==
108,347 party members participated in the vote, equal to 70.10% of the party's roughly 150,000 members.

If no candidate had received at least 40% of the vote, a runoff election would have been held. Rabin placed first, and managed to narrowly surpass the 40% threshold, thereby winning the leadership election outright in the initial round.

The polling location in Kiryat Shmona (the polling location for 500 party members) was not opened for the vote due to conflict arising in the area at the time of the vote. Polling stations in all other areas of the country, however, were opened as planned.

Yisrael Kessar's performance was regarded as surprisingly strong.

1992 Israeli Labor Party leadership election
| Candidate | Votes | % |
|---|---|---|
| Yizhak Rabin | | 40.6 |
| Shimon Peres (incumbent) | | 34.5 |
| Yisrael Kessar | | 19.0 |
| Ora Namir | | 5.5 |
| Total votes | 108,347 | 100 |
| Turnout | | 70.10% |
