= Yitzhak Rabin =

Prime Minister of Israel (1974–1977; 1992–1995)

- יִצְחָק רַבִּין
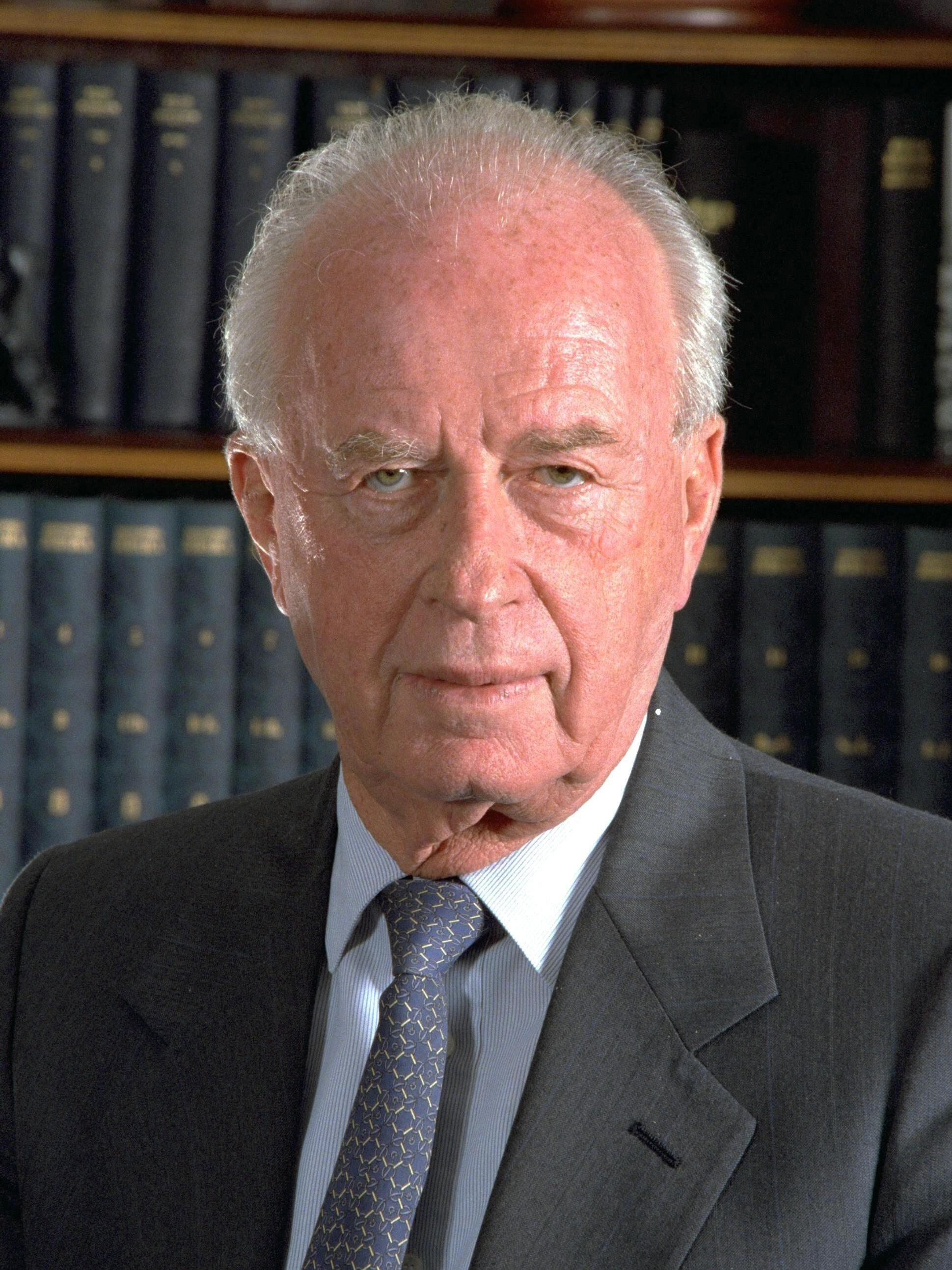
- Rabin in 1994

Prime Minister of Israel
- In office 13 July 1992 – 4 November 1995
- President: Chaim Herzog; Ezer Weizman
- Preceded by: Yitzhak Shamir
- Succeeded by: Shimon Peres
- In office 3 June 1974 – 21 June 1977 (Note: Shimon Peres unofficially served as Acting Prime Minister from 22 April 1977.)
- President: Ephraim Katzir
- Preceded by: Golda Meir
- Succeeded by: Menachem Begin

Leader of the Opposition
- De facto 20 February 1992 – 13 July 1992
- Prime Minister: Yitzhak Shamir
- Preceded by: Shimon Peres
- Succeeded by: Yitzhak Shamir

Member of the Knesset
- In office 14 January 1974 – 4 November 1995

Ambassadorial posts
- 1968–1973: United States

Ministerial portfolios
- 1974: Labor
- 1974–1975: Communications
- 1975: Welfare
- 1984–1990: Defense
- 1992–1995: Defense
- 1992: Labor and Social Welfare
- 1992: Jerusalem Affairs
- 1992–1995: Religious Affairs
- 1993: Education and Culture
- 1993–1995: Internal Affairs
- 1994: Health

Personal details
- Born: 1 March 1922 Jerusalem, Mandatory Palestine
- Died: 4 November 1995 (aged 73) Tel Aviv, Israel
- Cause of death: Assassination by gunshot
- Resting place: Mount Herzl National Cemetery, Jerusalem
- Party: Alignment, Labor Party
- Spouse: Leah Rabin (m. 1948)
- Relations: Rachel Rabin (sister)
- Children: Dalia Rabin-Pelossof; Yuval Rabin
- Profession: Military officer

Military service
- Allegiance: Israel
- Branch/service: Haganah; Israel Defense Forces
- Years of service: 1941–1967
- Rank: Rav Aluf
- Battles/wars: World War II; Syria–Lebanon Campaign; Jewish insurgency in Mandatory Palestine; 1947–1948 civil war in Mandatory Palestine; 1948 Arab–Israeli War; Altalena Affair; Operation Dani; Six-Day War

Yitzhak Rabin (/ˈrɑːbɪn/; (Note: Colloquially often /rəˈbiːn/ in both English and Hebrew, assuming the Israeli Hebrew ultimate stress. However, "Rabin" (originally an Ashkenazic form of Reuben) was traditionally pronounced with a penultimate stress like most words in Ashkenazic Hebrew. Listen to Yitzhak pronounce it here. Not to be confused with its Talmudic homograph, which is a portmanteau of rabbi and Abin.) Hebrew: יִצְחָק רַבִּין, IPA: [itsˈχak ˈʁabin]; 1 March 1922 – 4 November 1995) was an Israeli statesman and general who was the prime minister of Israel, having served from 1974 to 1977 and again from 1992 until his assassination in 1995. He was the first prime minister to have been born in the region of Palestine, at the time under British control.

Rabin was born in Jerusalem to Jewish immigrants from Eastern Europe and was raised in a Labor Zionist household. He learned agriculture in school and excelled as a student. As a teenager, he joined the Palmach, the commando force of the Yishuv. He eventually rose through its ranks to become its chief of operations during the 1948 Arab–Israeli War. In late 1948, he joined the newly formed Israel Defense Forces and continued to rise as a promising officer, with a 27-year career as a professional soldier. He ultimately attained the rank of Rav Aluf, the most senior rank in the Israeli Defense Force (often translated as lieutenant general). In the 1950s, Rabin helped shape the training doctrine of the IDF and he led its Operations Directorate from 1959 to 1963. He was appointed chief of the general staff in 1964 and oversaw Israel's victory in the 1967 Six-Day War.

Rabin served as Israel's ambassador to the United States from 1968 to 1973, during a period of deepening U.S.–Israel ties. He was appointed Prime Minister of Israel in 1974 after the resignation of Golda Meir. In his first term, Rabin signed the Sinai Interim Agreement and ordered the Entebbe raid. He resigned in 1977 in the wake of a financial scandal. Rabin was Israel's minister of defense for much of the 1980s, including during the outbreak of the First Intifada.

In 1992, Rabin was re-elected as prime minister on a platform embracing the Israeli–Palestinian peace process. He signed several historic agreements with the Palestinian leadership as part of the Oslo Accords. In 1994, Rabin won the Nobel Peace Prize together with long-time political rival Shimon Peres and Palestinian leader Yasser Arafat. Rabin also signed a peace treaty with Jordan in 1994. In November 1995, he was assassinated by Yigal Amir, an extremist who opposed the terms of the Oslo Accords. Amir was convicted of Rabin's murder and sentenced to life imprisonment. Rabin was the first native-born prime minister of Israel, the only prime minister to be assassinated, and the second to die in office after Levi Eshkol. Rabin has become a symbol of the Israeli–Palestinian peace process.

== Personal life ==
=== Family background ===
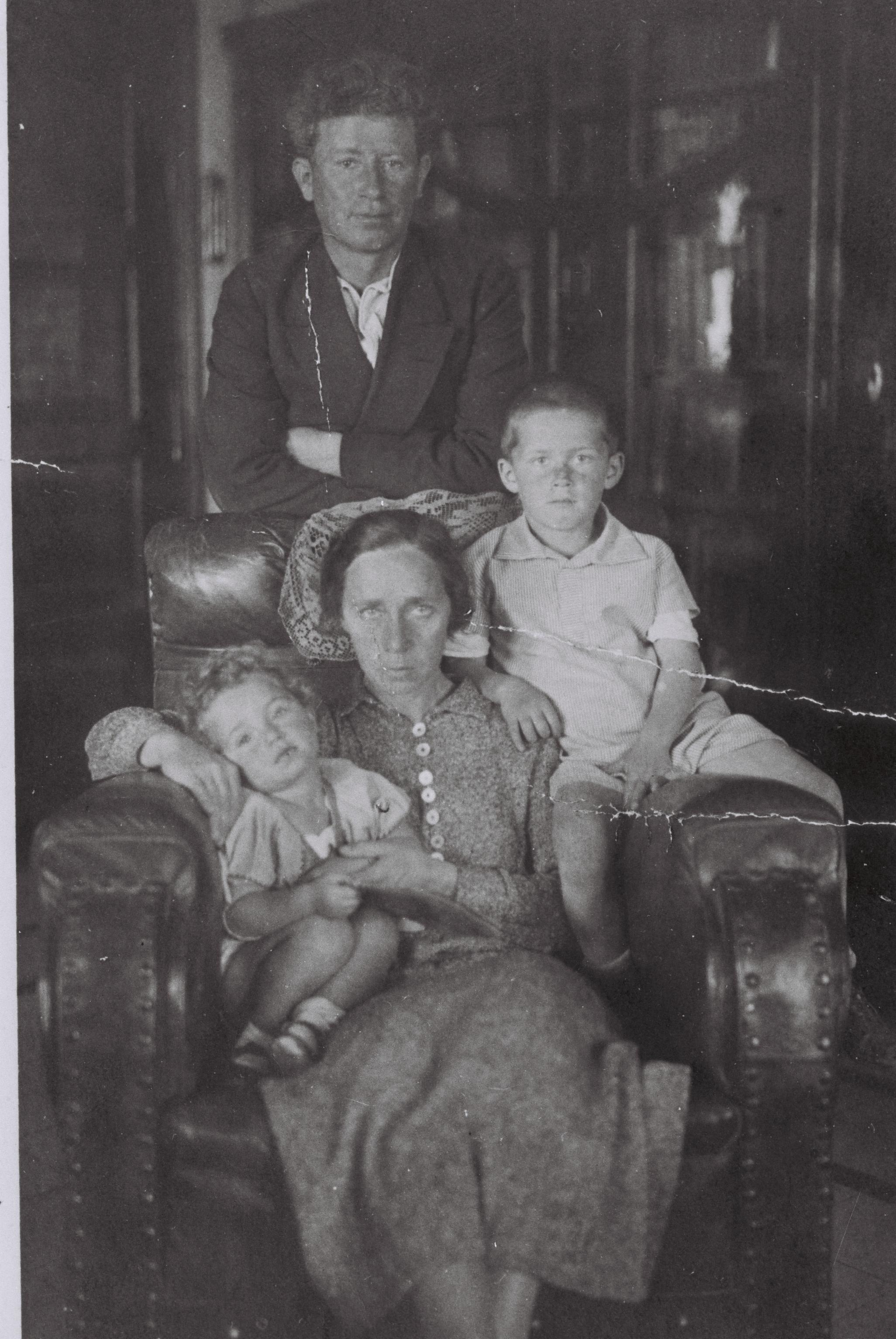
Rabin with his parents and sister, 1927

Rabin was born at Shaare Zedek Medical Center in Jerusalem, Mandatory Palestine, on 1 March 1922, to Nehemiah (1886 – 1 December 1971) and Rosa (née Cohen; 1890 – 12 November 1937) Rabin, immigrants of the Third Aliyah, the third wave of Jewish immigration to Palestine from Europe. Nehemiah was born Nehemiah Rubitzov in the shtetl Sydorovychi near Ivankiv in the southern Pale of Settlement (present-day Ukraine). His father Menachem died when he was a boy, and Nehemiah worked to support his family from an early age. At the age of 18, he emigrated to the United States, settling initially in Chicago and then St. Louis. He joined the Poale Zion party and changed his surname to Rabin. In 1917, Nehemiah Rabin went to Palestine with a group of volunteers from the Jewish Legion during World War I.

Yitzhak's mother, Rosa Cohen, was born in 1890 in Mogilev in Belarus. Her father, a rabbi, opposed the Zionist movement and sent Rosa to a Christian high school for girls in Gomel, which gave her a broad general education. Early on, Rosa took an interest in political and social causes. In 1919, she traveled to Palestine on the steamship Ruslan. After working on a kibbutz on the shores of the Sea of Galilee, she moved to Jerusalem.

Rabin's parents met in Jerusalem during the 1920 Nebi Musa riots. They moved to Tel Aviv in 1923, settling on Chlenov Street near Jaffa. Nehemiah became a worker for the Palestine Electric Corporation and Rosa was an accountant and local activist. She became a member of the Tel Aviv City Council. The family moved again in 1931 to a two-room apartment on Hamagid Street in Tel Aviv.

Rabin had a younger sister, Rachel Rabin (1925-2026). She was among the pioneers of kibbutz Manara from its founding in 1943, and worked as an educator for decades.

=== Early life and education ===
Yitzhak (Isaac) Rabin grew up in Tel Aviv, where the family relocated when he was one year old. He enrolled in the Tel Aviv Beit Hinuch Leyaldei Ovdim (בית חינוך לילדי עובדים, "School House for Workers' Children") in 1928 and completed his studies there in 1935. The school taught the children agriculture as well as Zionism. Rabin mostly received good marks in school, but he was so shy that few people knew he was intelligent.

In 1935, Rabin enrolled at an agricultural school on kibbutz Givat Hashlosha that his mother founded. It was here in 1936 at the age of 14 that Rabin joined the Haganah and received his first military training, learning how to use a pistol and stand guard. He joined a socialist-Zionist youth movement, HaNoar HaOved.

In 1937, he enrolled at the two-year Kadoorie Agricultural High School. He excelled in a number of agriculture-related subjects but disliked studying English language—the language of the British "enemy". He originally aspired to be an irrigation engineer, but his interest in military affairs intensified in 1938, when the ongoing Arab revolt worsened. A young Haganah sergeant named Yigal Allon, later a general in the IDF and prominent politician, trained Rabin and others at Kadoorie. Rabin finished at Kadoorie in August 1940. For part of 1939, the British closed Kadoorie, and Rabin joined Allon as a security guard at Kibbutz Ginosar until the school re-opened. When he finished school, Rabin considered studying irrigation engineering on scholarship at the University of California, Berkeley, although he ultimately decided to stay and fight in Palestine.

== Marriage and family ==
Rabin married Leah Schlossberg during the 1948 Arab–Israeli War. Leah Rabin was working at the time as a reporter for a Palmach newspaper. They had two children, Dalia (born 19 March 1950) and Yuval (born 18 June 1955). Similar to the entire Israeli elite of the time, Rabin adhered to a secular-national understanding of Jewish identity, and was non-religious. American diplomat Dennis Ross described him as "the most secular Jew he had met in Israel".

== Military career ==
=== Palmach ===
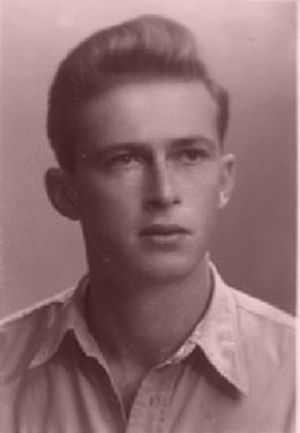
Rabin shortly before joining the Palmach

In 1941, during his practical training at kibbutz Ramat Yohanan, Rabin joined the newly formed Palmach section of the Haganah, under the influence of Yigal Allon. Rabin could not yet operate a machine gun, drive a car, or ride a motorcycle, but Moshe Dayan accepted the new recruit. The Palmach was formed as the elite strike force of the Haganah with British assistance as Axis forces approached Palestine. The first operation he participated in was assisting Allied forces in the Syria–Lebanon campaign against Vichy French forces during World War II (the same operation in which Dayan lost his eye) in June–July 1941. Palmach commando units infiltrated Vichy French-held territory and conducted sabotage operations ahead of the main Allied invasion. Rabin was part of a unit that infiltrated Lebanon and conducted telephone sabotage. As the youngest man in the unit, he was selected to climb the telephone poles and cut the wires.

In 1942, Rabin participated in a British-run sabotage and demolition course. However, as Allied fortunes changed with the Second Battle of El Alamein, the British attempted to dismantle the Palmach. As a Palmachnik, Rabin and his men had to lie low to avoid arousing inquiry from the British administration. They spent most of their time farming, training secretly part-time. They wore no uniforms and received no public recognition during this time. In 1943, Rabin took command of a platoon at Kfar Giladi. He trained his men in modern tactics and how to conduct lightning attacks.

After the end of the war the relationship between the Yishuv and the British authorities became strained, especially with respect to the treatment of Jewish immigration. In October 1945 Rabin planned a Palmach raid on the Atlit detainee camp in which 208 Jewish illegal immigrants who had been interned there were freed. In 1946, he was arrested in Operation Agatha, a massive British operation against the leaders of the Jewish Establishment in the British Mandate of Palestine and the Palmach known as the "Black Sabbath", and detained for five months. After his release he became the commander of the second Palmach battalion and rose to the position of Chief Operations Officer of the Palmach in October 1947.

=== IDF service ===
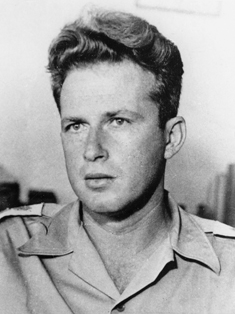
Yitzhak Rabin, commander of the Harel Brigade, c. 1948

During the 1948 Arab–Israeli War, Rabin directed Israeli operations in Jerusalem and fought the Egyptian army in the Negev. During the beginning of the war he was the commander of the Harel Brigade, which fought on the road to Jerusalem from the coastal plain, including the Israeli "Burma Road", as well as many battles in Jerusalem, such as securing the southern side of the city by recapturing kibbutz Ramat Rachel.

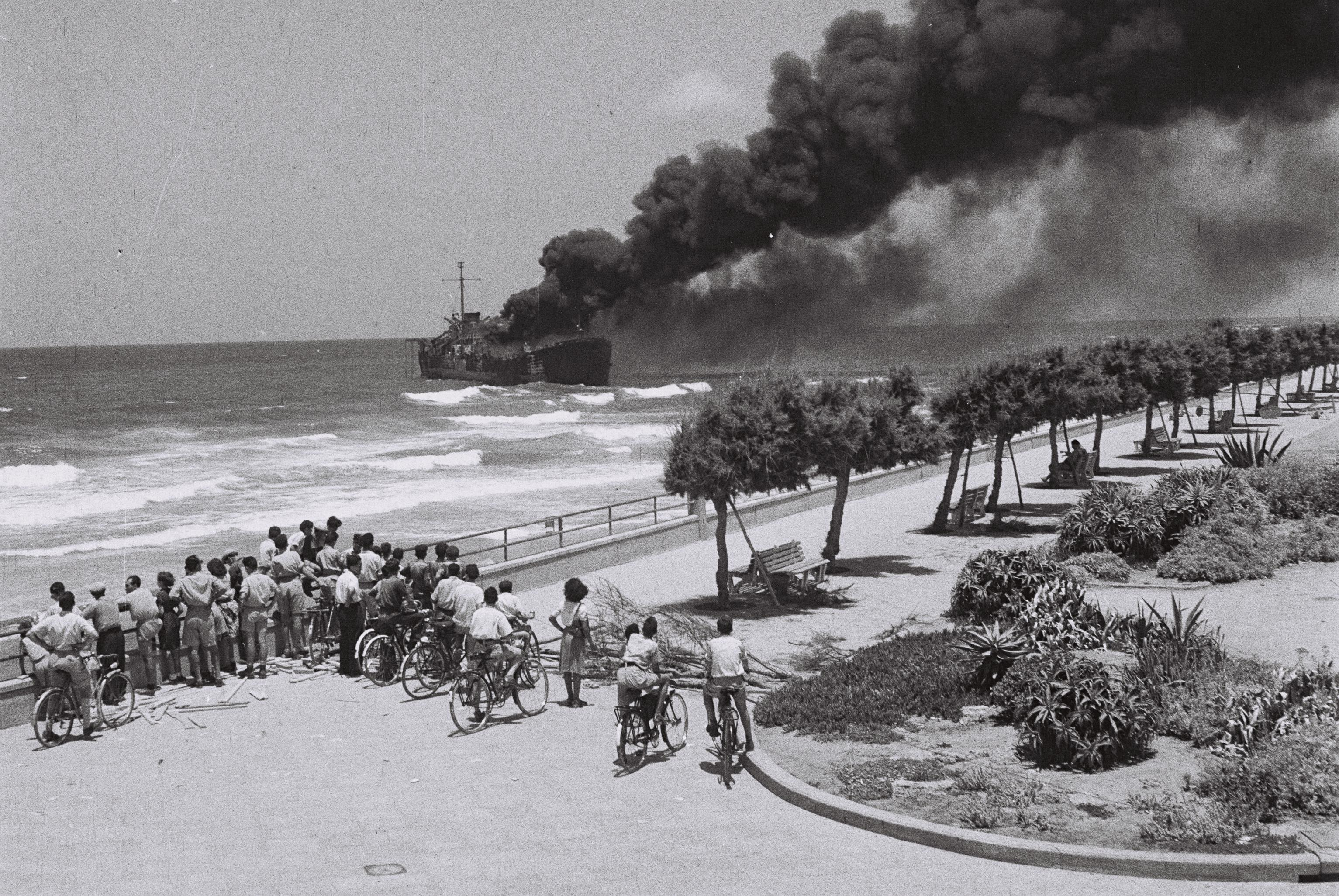
Altalena on fire after being shelled near Tel Aviv

During the first truce Rabin commanded IDF forces on the beach of Tel Aviv confronting the Irgun during the tragic Altalena Affair. The Altalena ship carried volunteers from abroad coming to fight in War of Independence and large amounts of weapons and ammunition for the war. It was organized by Hillel Kook of the Irgun. The day after much of the contents were offloaded at Kfar Vitkin the ship was attacked at Ben Gurion's orders off the Tel Aviv shore, set on fire, later towed out to sea and sunk. Large number of volunteers were killed on board and after jumping in the sea. Rabin called the gun on shore "The Holy Gun". "Despite the tension and bloodshed, Begin went on the radio calling on members of the Irgun not to fight the IDF: Do not raise a hand against a brother, not even today. It is forbidden for a Hebrew weapon to be used against Hebrew fighters." This probably prevented the likelihood of civil war. Hillel Kook was arrested.

In the following period he was the deputy commander of Operation Danny, the largest scale operation to that point, which involved four IDF brigades. The cities of Ramle and Lydda were captured, as well as the major airport in Lydda, as part of the operation. Following the capture of the two towns there was an expulsion of their Arab population. Rabin signed the expulsion order, which included the following:

... 1. The inhabitants of Lydda must be expelled quickly without attention to age. ... 2. Implement immediately.

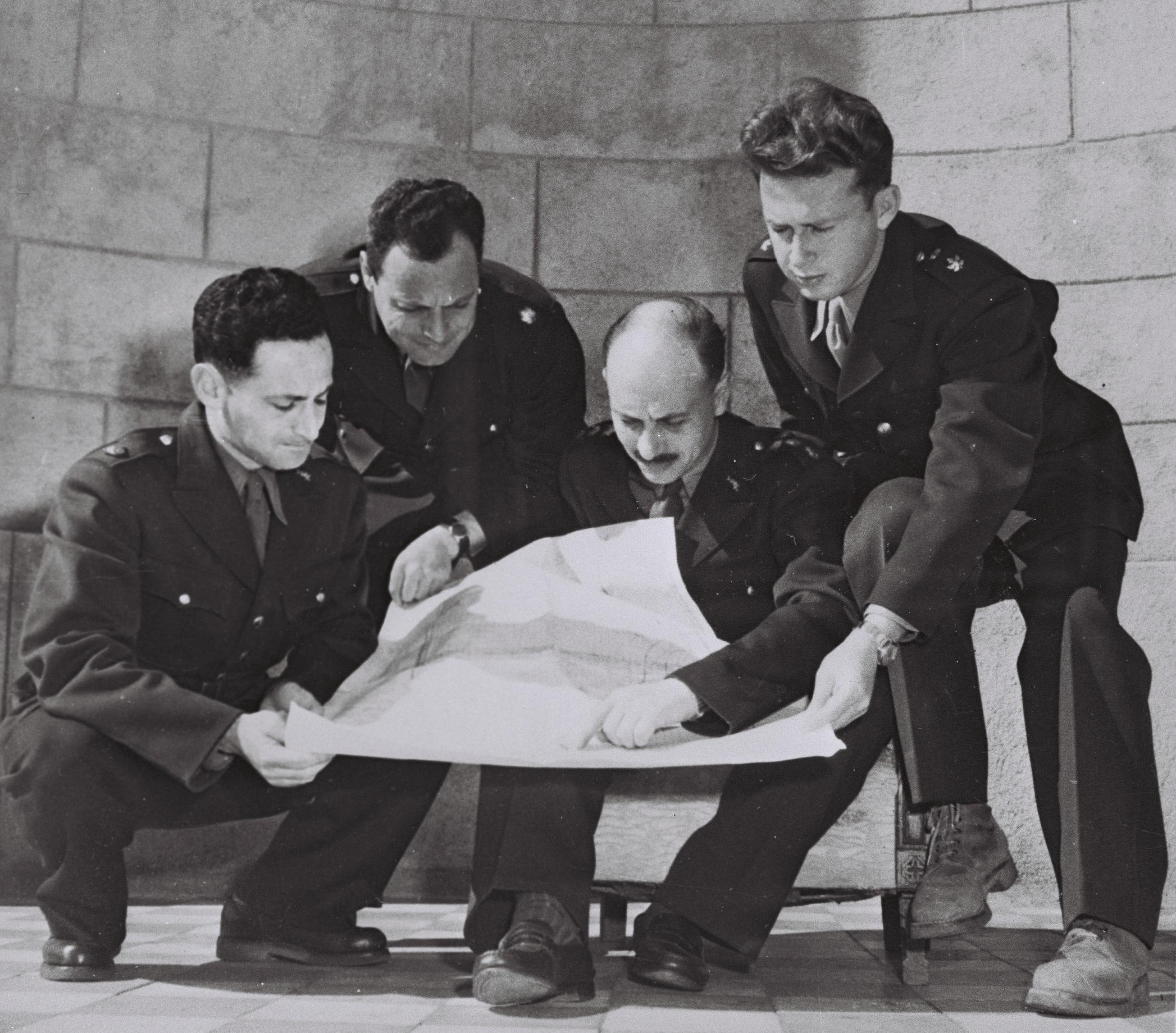
The Israeli delegation to the 1949 Armistice Agreements talks. Left to right: Commanders Yehoshafat Harkabi, Aryeh Simon, Yigael Yadin, and Yitzhak Rabin (1949)

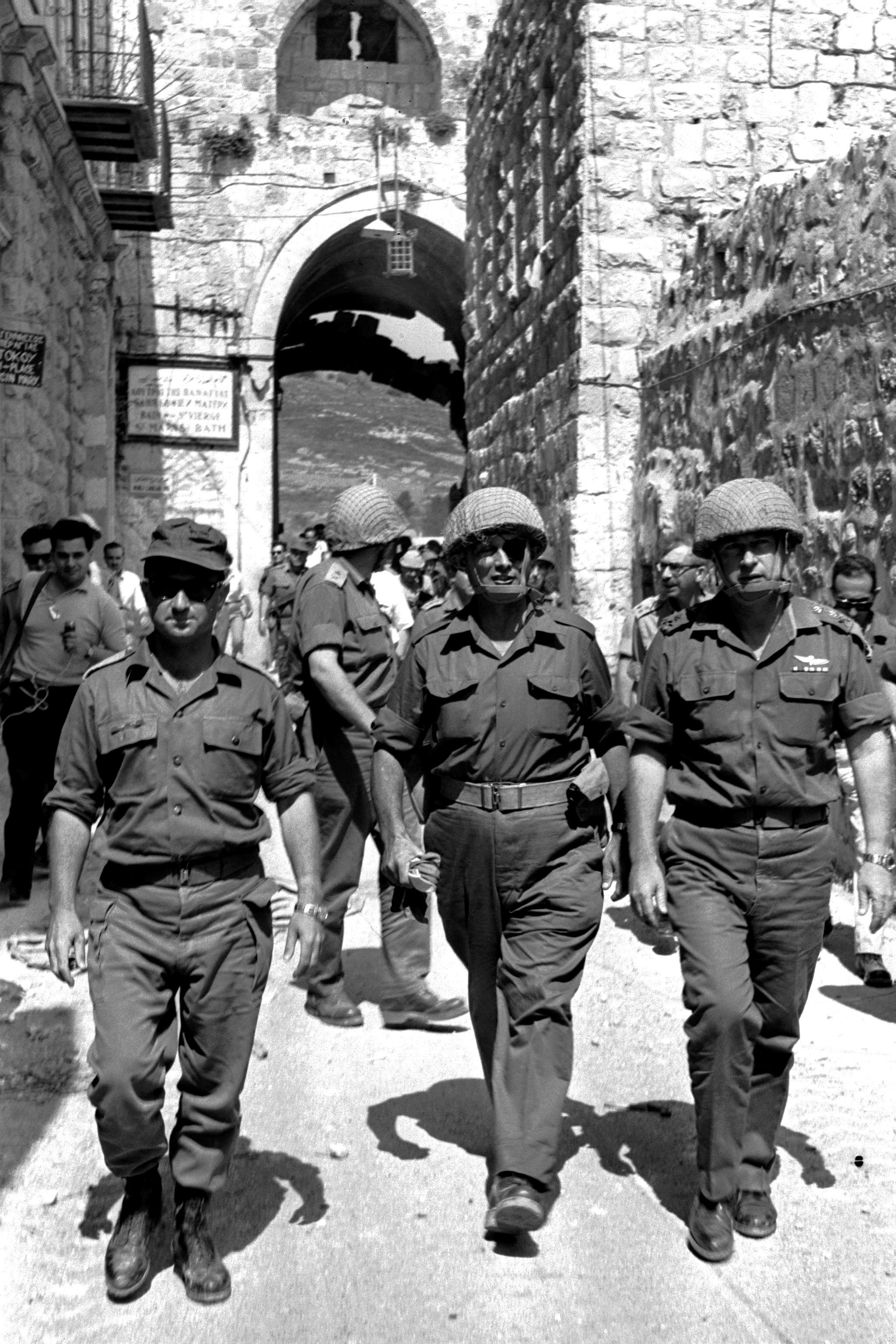
Chief of Staff Yitzhak Rabin (right) with Minister of Defense Moshe Dayan (center) and General Uzi Narkiss (left) in the Old City of Jerusalem following its capture during the Six-Day War

Rabin with Richard Nixon in Tel Aviv, 22 June 1967

Later, Rabin was chief of operations for the Southern Front and participated in the major battles ending the fighting there, including Operation Yoav and Operation Horev.

In the beginning of 1949 he was a member of the Israeli delegation to the armistice talks with Egypt that were held on the island of Rhodes. The result of the negotiations were the 1949 Armistice Agreements, which ended the official hostilities of the 1948 Arab–Israeli War. Following the demobilization at the end of the war he was the most senior (former) member of the Palmach that remained in the IDF.

Like many Palmach leaders, Rabin was politically aligned with the left wing pro-Soviet Ahdut HaAvoda party and later Mapam. These officers were distrusted by Prime Minister David Ben-Gurion and several resigned from the army in 1953 after a series of confrontations. Those members of Mapam who remained, such as Rabin, Haim Bar-Lev and David Elazar, had to endure several years in staff or training posts before resuming their careers.

Rabin headed Israel's Northern Command from 1956 to 1959. In 1964 he was appointed chief of staff of the Israel Defense Forces (IDF) by Levi Eshkol, who had replaced David Ben-Gurion as Prime Minister and Minister of Defence. Since Eshkol did not have much military experience and trusted Rabin's judgement, he had a very free hand. According to the memoirs of Eshkol's military secretary, Eshkol followed Rabin "with closed eyes".

Under his command, the IDF achieved victory over Egypt, Syria and Jordan in the Six-Day War in 1967. After the Old City of Jerusalem was captured by the IDF, Rabin was among the first to visit the Old City, and delivered a famous speech on Mount Scopus, at the Hebrew University. In the days leading up to the war, it was reported that Rabin suffered a nervous breakdown and was unable to function. After this short hiatus, he resumed full command over the IDF.

== Ambassador to the United States (1968–1973) ==
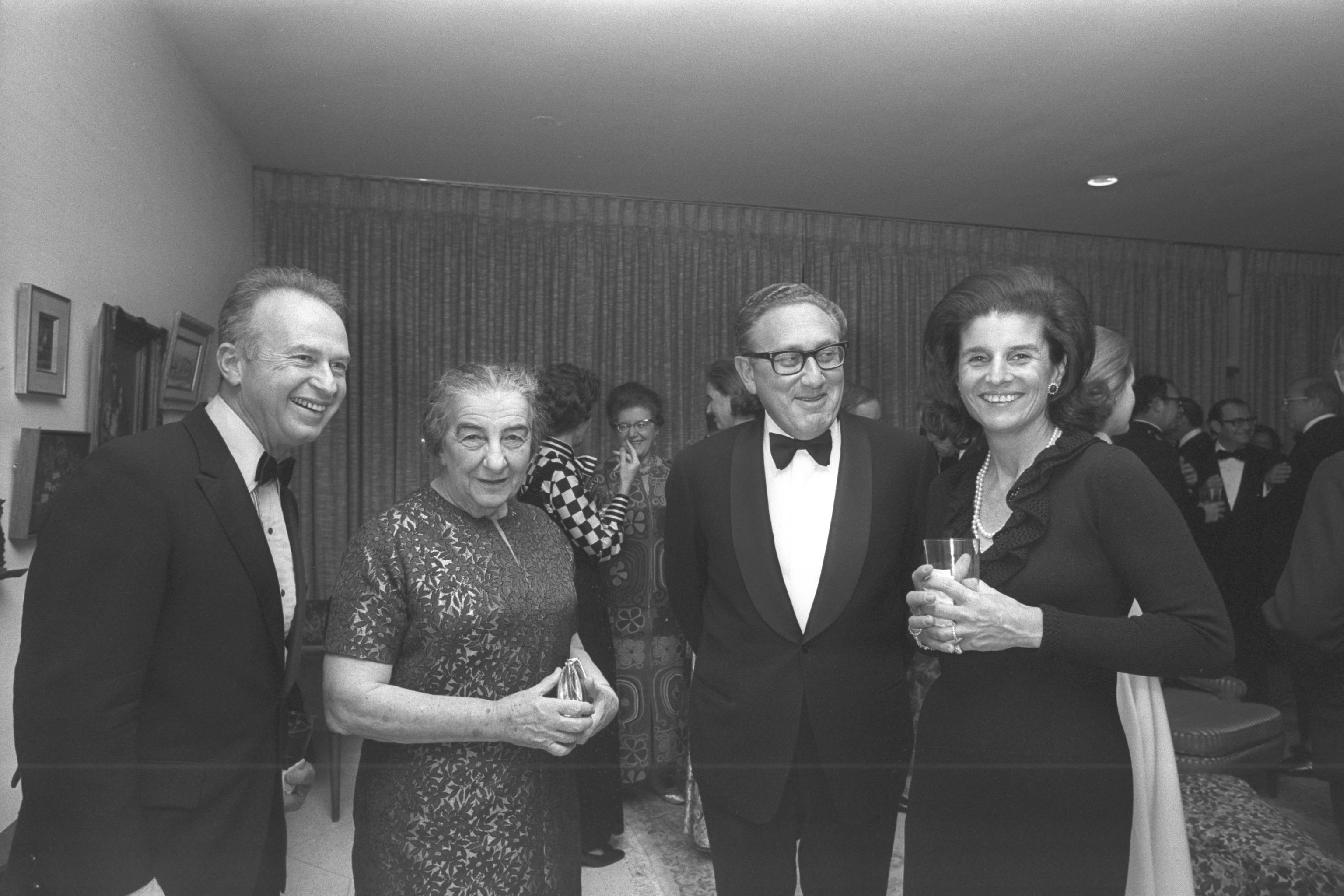
Israeli Ambassador to the United States, Yitzhak Rabin and his wife Leah in the company of PM Golda Meir and Secretary of State Henry Kissinger in Washington, D.C., February 1973

Following his retirement from the IDF he became ambassador to the United States beginning in 1968, serving for five years. In this period the US became the major weapon supplier of Israel and in particular he managed to get the embargo on the F-4 Phantom fighter jets lifted. During the 1973 Yom Kippur War he served in no official capacity.

== Minister of Labour ==
In the elections held at the end of 1973, Rabin was elected to the Knesset as a member of the Alignment. He was appointed Israeli Minister of Labour in March 1974 in the short-lived Golda Meir-led 16th government.

== First term as Prime Minister (1974–1977) ==
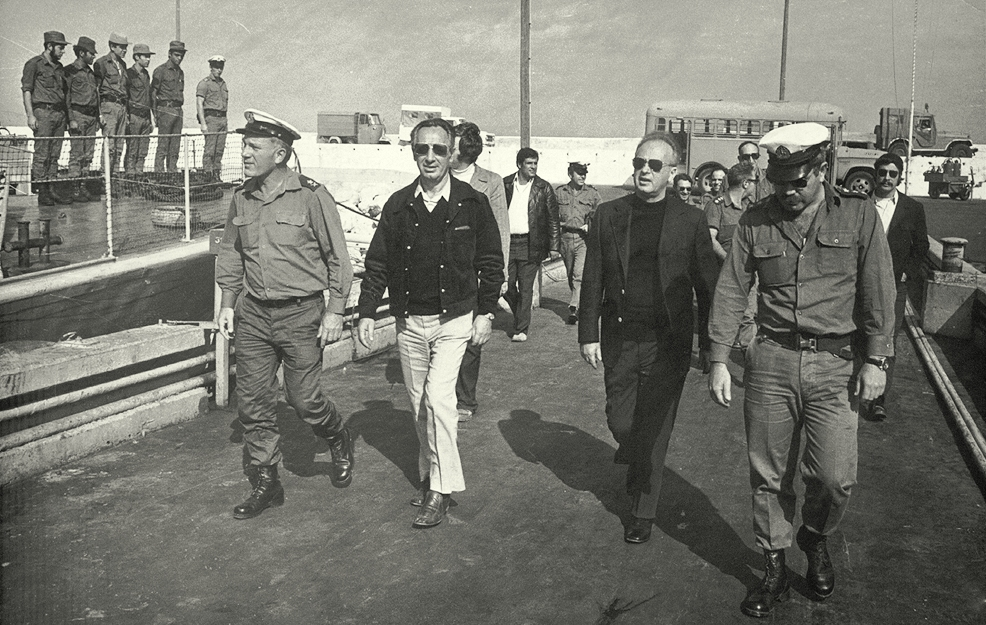
Prime Minister Yitzhak Rabin and Defense Minister Shimon Peres visiting the Missile Boat Flotilla in 1975

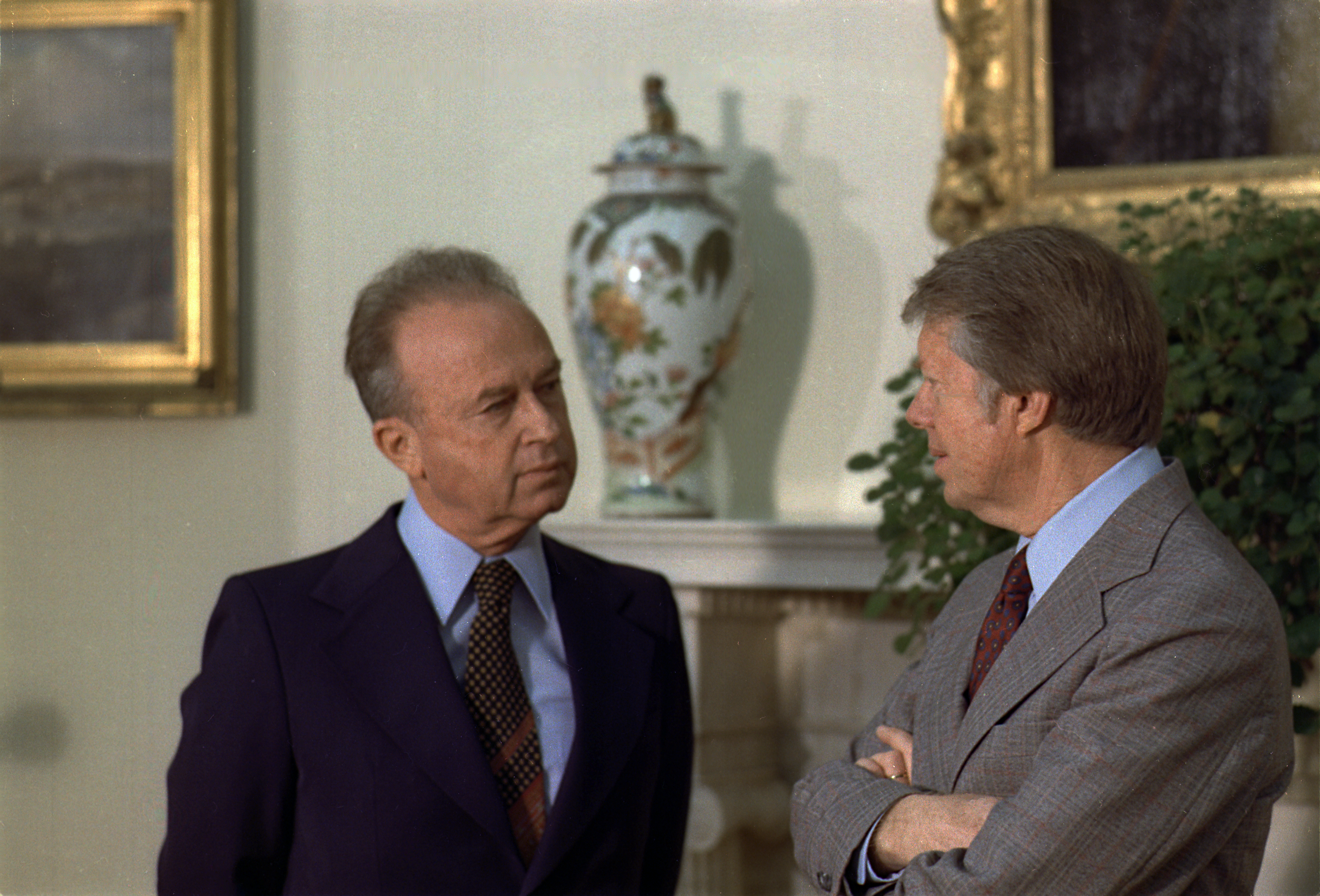
Rabin as Prime Minister with US President Jimmy Carter in 1977

Following Golda Meir's resignation in April 1974, Rabin was elected party leader, after he defeated Shimon Peres. The rivalry between these two Labour leaders remained fierce and they competed several times in the next two decades for the leadership role, and even for who deserved credit for government achievements. Rabin succeeded Golda Meir as Prime Minister of Israel on 3 June 1974. This was a coalition government, including Ratz, the Independent Liberals, Progress and Development and the Arab List for Bedouins and Villagers. This arrangement, with a bare parliamentary majority, held for a few months and was one of the few periods in Israel's history where the religious parties were not part of the coalition. The National Religious Party joined the coalition on 30 October 1974 and Ratz left on 6 November.

In foreign policy, the major development at the beginning of Rabin's term was the Sinai Interim Agreement between Israel and Egypt, signed on 1 September 1975. Both countries declared that the conflict between them and in the Middle East shall not be resolved by military force but by peaceful means. This agreement followed Henry Kissinger's shuttle diplomacy and a threatened "reassessment" of the United States' regional policy and its relations with Israel. Rabin notes it was "an innocent-sounding term that heralded one of the worst periods in American–Israeli relations." But the agreement was an important step towards the Camp David Accords of 1978 and the peace treaty with Egypt signed in 1979.

Operation Entebbe was perhaps the most dramatic event during Rabin's first term of office. On his orders, the IDF performed a long-range undercover raid to rescue passengers of an airliner hijacked by militants belonging to the Popular Front for the Liberation of Palestine's Wadie Haddad faction and the German Revolutionary Cells (RZ), who had been brought to Idi Amin's Uganda. The operation was generally considered a tremendous success, and its spectacular character has made it the subject of much continued comment and study.

Towards the end of 1976 his coalition government with the religious parties suffered a crisis: A motion of no confidence had been brought by Agudat Yisrael over a breach of the Sabbath on an Israeli Air Force base when four F-15 jets were delivered from the US and the National Religious Party had abstained. Rabin dissolved his government and decided on new elections, which were to be held in May 1977.

Rabin was narrowly reelected as party leader over Shimon Peres in February 1977.

Following the March 1977 meeting between Rabin and U.S. President Jimmy Carter, Rabin publicly announced that the U.S. supported the Israeli idea of defensible borders; Carter then issued a clarification. A "fallout" in U.S./Israeli relations ensued. It is thought that the fallout contributed to the Israeli Labor Party's defeat in the May 1977 elections. On 15 March 1977, Haaretz journalist Dan Margalit revealed that a joint dollar account in the names of Yitzhak and Leah Rabin, opened in a Washington, D.C., bank during Rabin's term of office as Israel ambassador (1968–73), was still open, in breach of Israeli law. According to Israeli currency regulations at the time, it was illegal for citizens to maintain foreign bank accounts without prior authorization. Rabin resigned on 7 April 1977, following the revelation by Maariv journalist S. Isaac Mekel that the Rabins held two accounts in Washington, not one, containing $10,000, and that a Finance Ministry administrative penalty committee fined them IL150,000. Rabin withdrew from the party leadership and candidacy for prime minister.

== Opposition Knesset member (1977–1984) ==
Following Labour Party's defeat in the 1977 election, Likud's Menachem Begin became prime minister, and Labor (which was part of the Alignment alliance) entered the opposition. Until 1984 Rabin, as a member of Knesset, sat on the Foreign Affairs and Defense Committee.

Rabin unsuccessfully challenged Shimon Peres for Israeli Labor Party leadership in the 1980 Israeli Labor Party leadership election.

== Minister of Defense (1984–1990) ==
From 1984 until 1990, Labor was in government as part of the coalitions which formed the 21st and 22nd governments during the 11th Knesset and the 23rd government during the first portion of the 10th Knesset.

From 1984 to 1990, Rabin served as Minister of Defense in several national unity governments led by prime ministers Yitzhak Shamir and Shimon Peres. When Rabin came to office, Israeli troops were still deep in Lebanon. Rabin ordered their withdrawal to a "Security Zone" on the Lebanese side of the border. The South Lebanon Army was active in this zone, along with the Israeli Defence Forces.

On 4 August 1985 Minister of Defence Rabin introduced an Iron Fist policy in the West Bank, reviving the use of British Mandate era legislation to detain people without trial, demolish houses, close newspapers and institutions as well as deporting activists. The change in policy came after a sustained public campaign demanding a tougher policy following the May 1985 prisoner exchange in which 1,150 Palestinians had been released.

In December 1987, the most significant series of demonstrations and riots by Palestinians broke out since the start of the Israeli-Palestinian conflict, soon transforming into a sustained popular uprising known as the First Intifada and marked by civil disobediance, strikes, boycotts of Israeli goods and institutions, and the creation of underground local institutions like classrooms and cooperatives. After initially failing to recognise the seriousness of the situation while out of the country on a diplomatic trip to the United States, Rabin adopted harsh measures to stop the uprising, ordering the Israeli military to use "force, might, and beatings" on Palestinian demonstrators. The measures led to significant international criticism, with the derogative term "bone breaker" was used as a critical international slogan. The combination of the failure of the "Iron Fist" policy, Israel's deteriorating international image, and Jordan cutting legal and administrative ties to the West Bank with the U.S.'s recognition of the PLO as the representative of the Palestinian people forced Rabin to seek an end to the violence through negotiation and dialogue with the PLO.

In 1988 Rabin was responsible for the assassination of Abu Jihad in Tunis and two weeks later he personally supervised the destruction of the Hizbullah stronghold in Meidoun during Operation Law and Order, in which the IDF said 40–50 Hizbullah fighters were killed. Three Israeli soldiers were killed and seventeen wounded.

Minister of Defence Rabin planned and executed the 27 July 1989 abduction of the Hizbullah leader Sheikh Abdel Karim Obeid and two of his aides from Jibchit in South Lebanon. Hizbullah responded by announcing the execution of Colonel Higgins, a senior American officer working with UNIFIL who had been kidnapped in February 1988.

== Opposition Knesset member (1990–1992) ==
In "the dirty trick", the Labor Party left the coalition of the 23rd government in an effort to form a new coalition to be led by Peres. This failed as Yitzhak Shamir formed the 24th government with Labor in the opposition for the remainder of the 10th Knesset.

From 1990 to 1992, Rabin again sat on the Knesset's Foreign Affairs and Defense Committee.

Following the backfiring of "the dirty trick" on Peres and the Labor Party, Rabin unsuccessfully attempted to persuade the party to schedule a leadership election in 1990. A prospective leadership race in 1990 had looked promising to Rabin. Peres was weakened from the backfiring of "the dirty trick", and polling showed Rabin to be the nation's most popular politician. Additionally, many of Peres' longtime backers in the party had begun shifting their support to Rabin. In July 1990, the Labor Party's 120 member Leadership Bureau voted to recommend that the party hold an immediate leadership election. However, one week later, on 22 July 1990, the 1,400 member Labor Party Central Committee voted 54 to 46% against holding an immediate leadership contest. This set the party up to not hold a leadership election until at least following year, unless the next Knesset election were to have been scheduled earlier than the anticipated 1992. The committee's vote to reject Rabin's push for a 1990 leadership contest was regarded as an upset result.

=== Return to party leadership ===
In its 1992 leadership election, Rabin was elected as chairman of the Labor Party, unseating Shimon Peres.

== Second term as Prime Minister ==
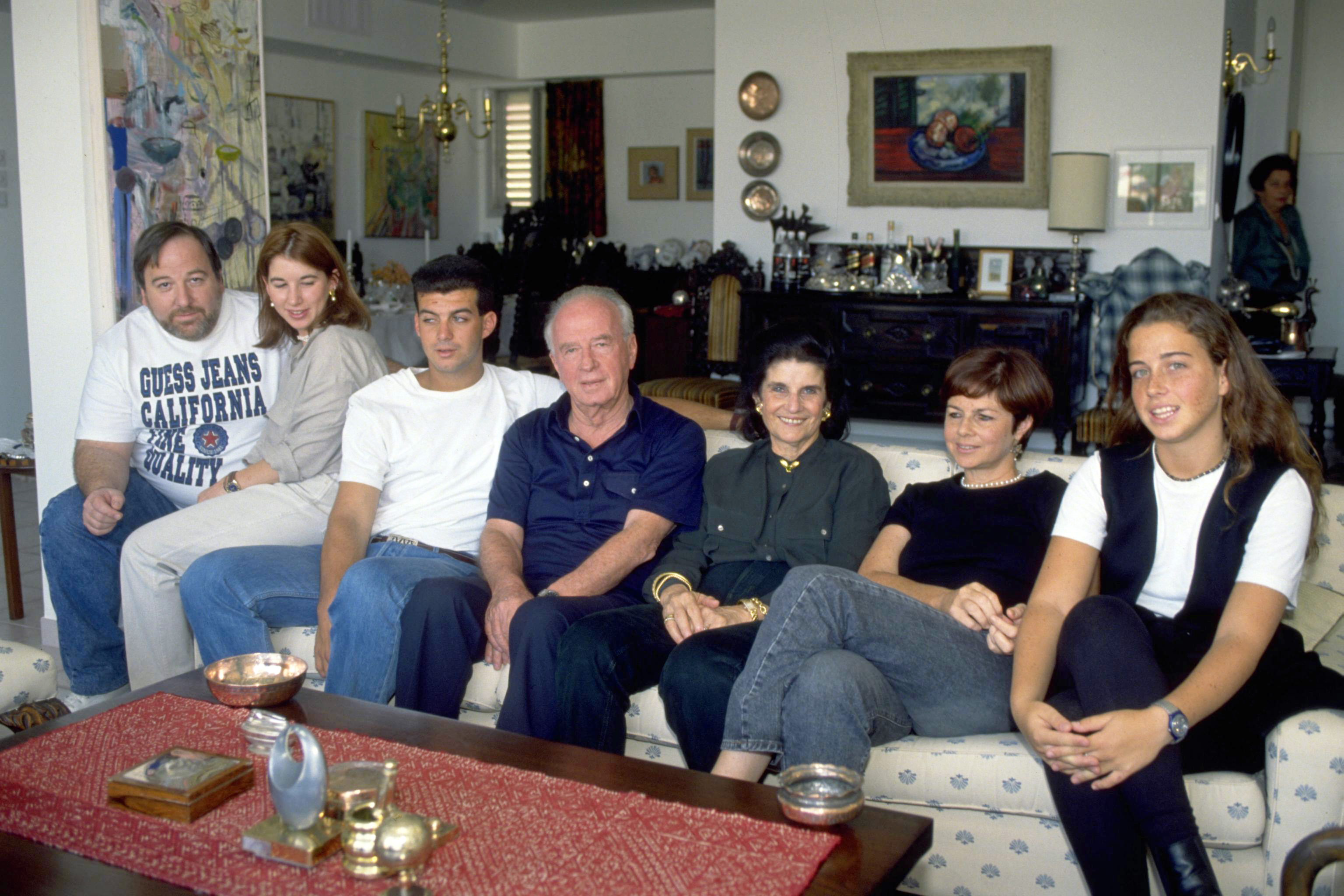
Rabin at home with his wife, grandson, daughter, then son-in-law, and two of his granddaughters in 1992.

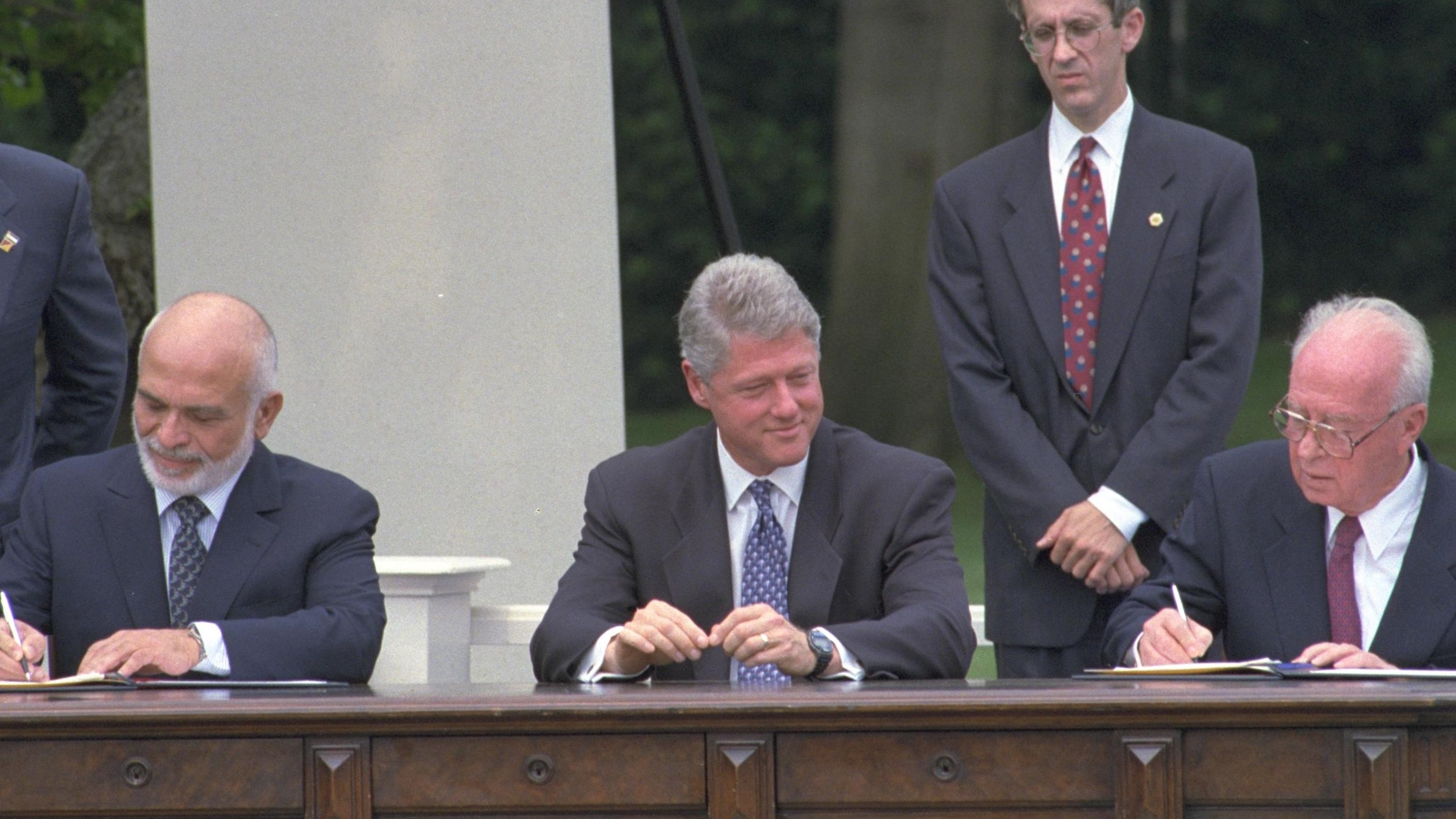
Bill Clinton watches Jordan's King Hussein (left) and Israeli Prime Minister Yitzhak Rabin (right) sign the Israel–Jordan peace treaty

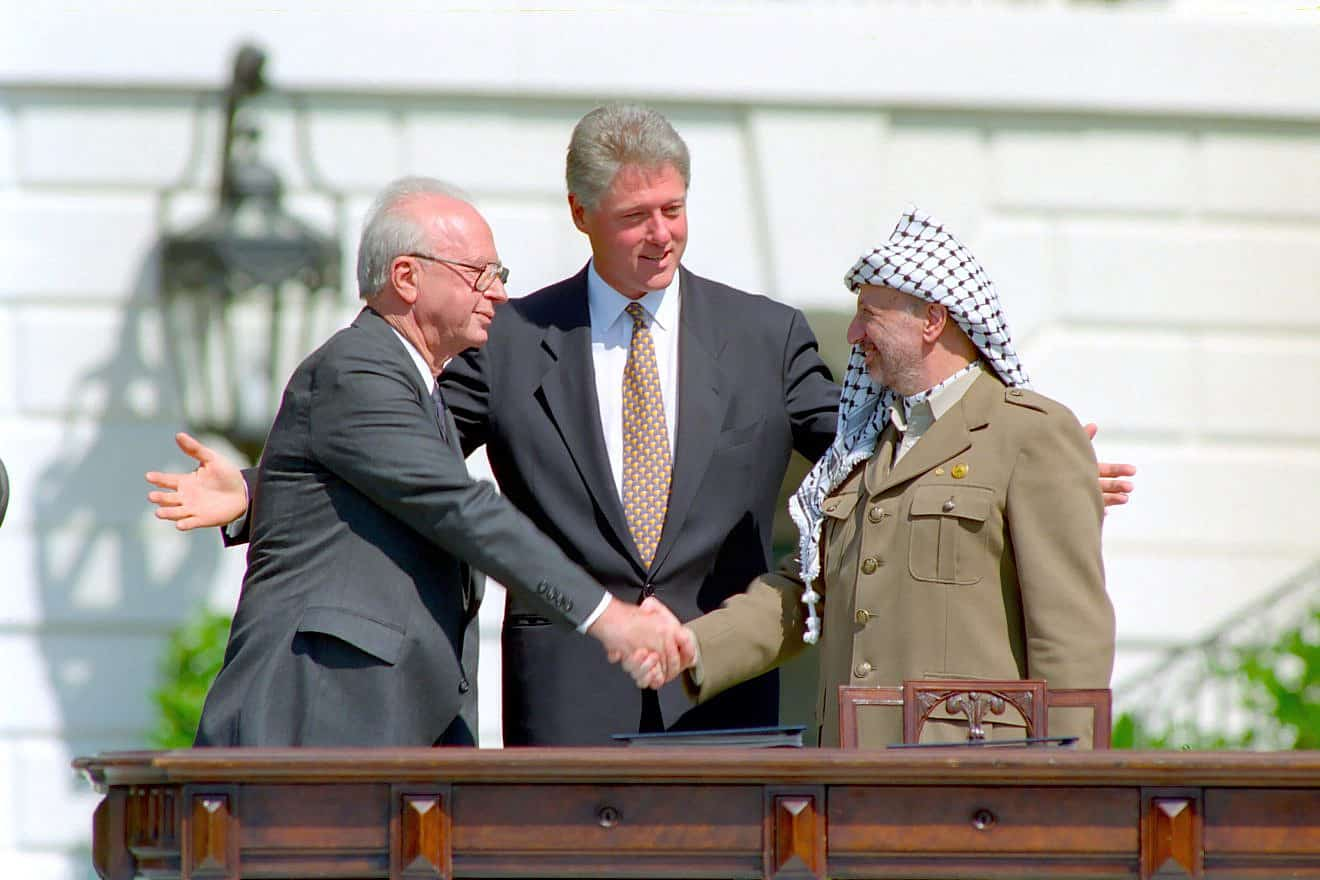
Yitzhak Rabin, Bill Clinton, and Yasser Arafat during the Oslo Accords on 13 September 1993

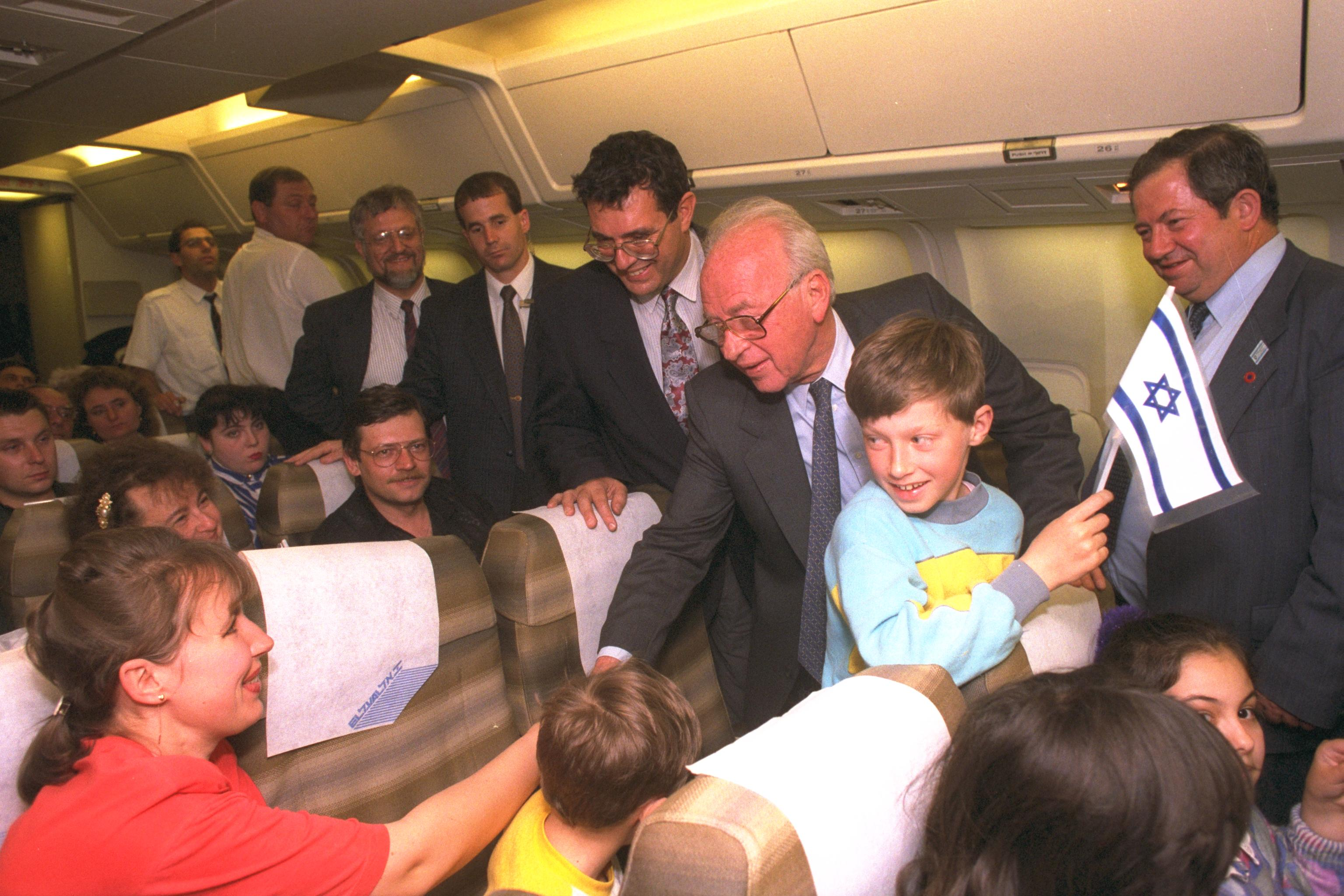
Rabin shaking hands with new Russian immigrants on their flight to Israel in 1994

In the 1992 Israeli legislative election, the Labor Party, led by Rabin, strongly focused on his popularity. The party managed to win a clear victory over the Likud of incumbent Prime Minister Yitzhak Shamir. However, the left-wing bloc in the Knesset only won an overall narrow majority, facilitated by the failure of small nationalist parties to pass the electoral threshold. Rabin formed the first Labor-led government in fifteen years, supported by a coalition with Meretz, a left wing party, and Shas, a Mizrahi ultra-orthodox religious party.

On 25 July 1993, after Hezbollah fired rockets into northern Israel, Rabin authorized a week-long military operation in Lebanon. Rabin played a leading role in the signing of the Oslo Accords, which created the Palestinian National Authority and granted it partial control over parts of the Gaza Strip and West Bank. Prior to the signing of the accords, Rabin received a letter from PLO chairman Yasser Arafat renouncing violence and officially recognizing Israel, and on the same day, 9 September 1993, Rabin sent Arafat a letter officially recognizing the PLO. Two days earlier, Rabin explained that his main motive for negotiating with Palestinians was that, "The Palestinians will be better at it than we were, ... because they will allow no appeals to the Supreme Court and will prevent the Israeli Association of Civil Rights from criticizing the conditions there by denying it access to the area. They will rule by their own methods, freeing, and this is most important, the Israeli army soldiers from having to do what they will do."

After the announcement of the Oslo Accords there were many protest demonstrations in Israel objecting to the Accords. As these protests dragged on, Rabin insisted that as long as he had a majority in the Knesset he would ignore the protests and the protesters. In this context he said, "they (the protesters) can spin around and around like propellers" but he would continue on the path of the Oslo Accords. Rabin's parliamentary majority rested on non-coalition member Arab support. Rabin also denied the right of American Jews to object to his plan for peace, calling any such dissent "chutzpah". The Oslo agreement was also opposed by Hamas and other Palestinian factions, which launched suicide bombings at Israel.

After the historical handshake with Yasser Arafat, Rabin said, on behalf of the Israeli people,

"We who have fought against you, the Palestinians, we say to you today, in a loud and a clear voice; Enough of blood and tears. Enough!"

During this term of office, Rabin also oversaw the signing of the Israel–Jordan peace treaty in 1994.

=== Economic and social reforms ===
Rabin significantly reformed Israel's economy, as well as its education and healthcare systems. His government significantly expanded the privatization of business, moving away from the country's traditionally socialized economy. The scheme was described by Moshe Arens as a "privatization frenzy". In 1993, his government set up the "Yozma" program, under which attractive tax incentives were offered to foreign venture capital funds that invested in Israel and promised to double any investment with government funding. As a result, foreign venture capital funds invested heavily in the growing Israeli high-tech industry, contributing to Israel's economic growth and status as a world leader in high-tech. In 1995, the National Health Insurance Law was passed. The law created Israel's universal health care system, moving away from the traditionally Histadrut-dominated health insurance system. Doctors' wages were also raised by 50%. Education spending was raised by 70%, with new colleges being built in Israel's peripheral areas, and teachers' wages rising by one-fifth. His government also launched new public works projects such as the Cross-Israel Highway and an expansion of Ben Gurion Airport.

=== Nobel Peace Prize ===
I always believed that most of the people want peace and are ready to take a risk for it.

— Rabin declared to the rally in 1995, shortly before his death.

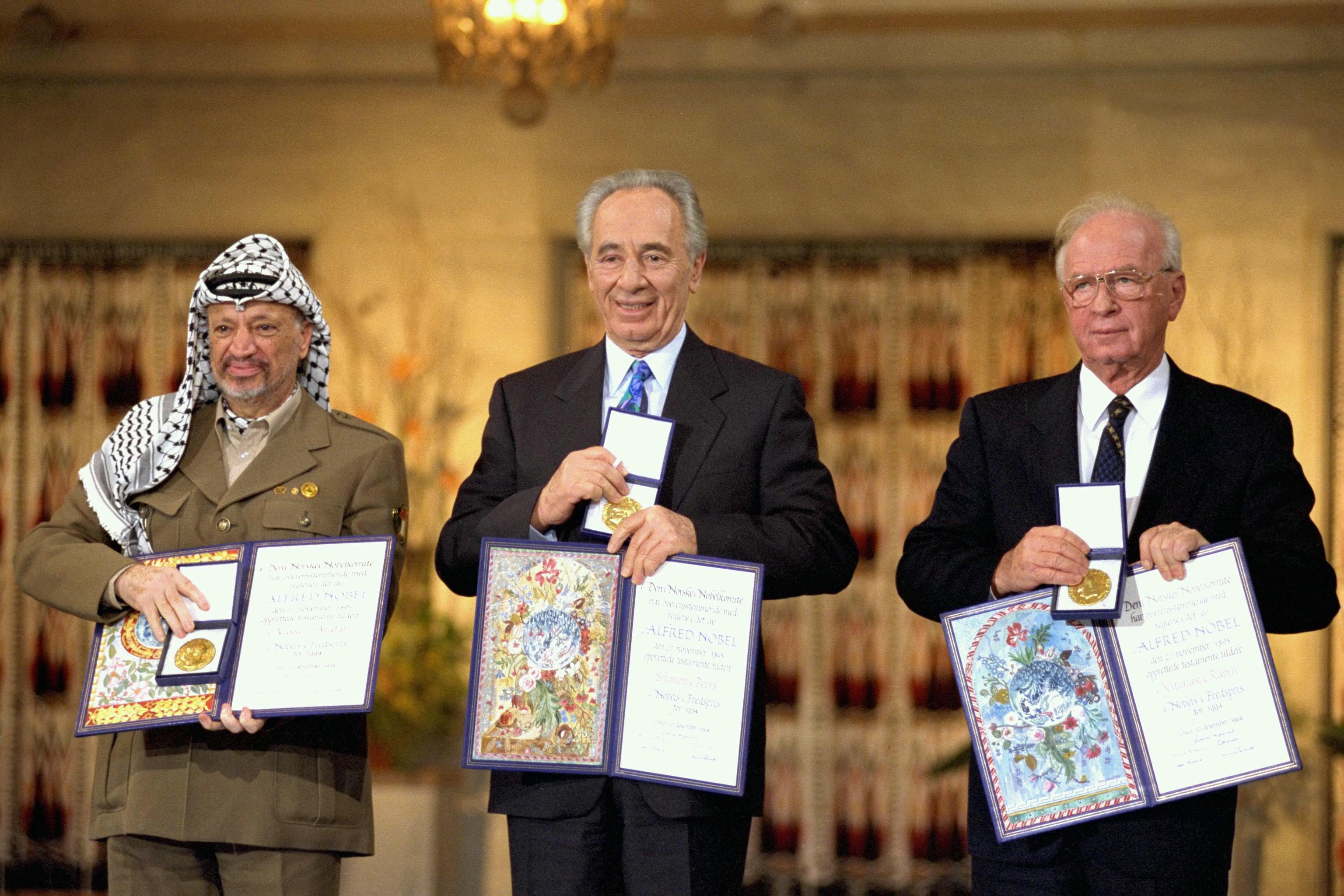
(right to left) Yitzhak Rabin, Shimon Peres and Yasser Arafat receiving the Nobel Peace Prize following the Oslo Accords

For his role in the creation of the Oslo Accords, Rabin was awarded the 1994 Nobel Peace Prize, along with Yasser Arafat and Shimon Peres. According to Israeli political scientist Efraim Inbar, the road for Israel to Oslo began with Rabin. While not committed to Palestinian statehood, he called for a peaceful coexistence between Israel as a Jewish state next to a Palestinian entity. Likewise, according to Efraim Karsh, "many Palestinians viewed the peace treaty with Israel as a temporary measure only". The two sides agreed on certain principles, setting the terms for further negotiations, with the promise of a permanent resolution within a number of years.

Military cemeteries in every corner of the world are silent testimony to the failure of national leaders to sanctify human life.

— Yitzhak Rabin, 1994 Nobel Peace Prize lecture, 10 December 1994

== Assassination and aftermath ==
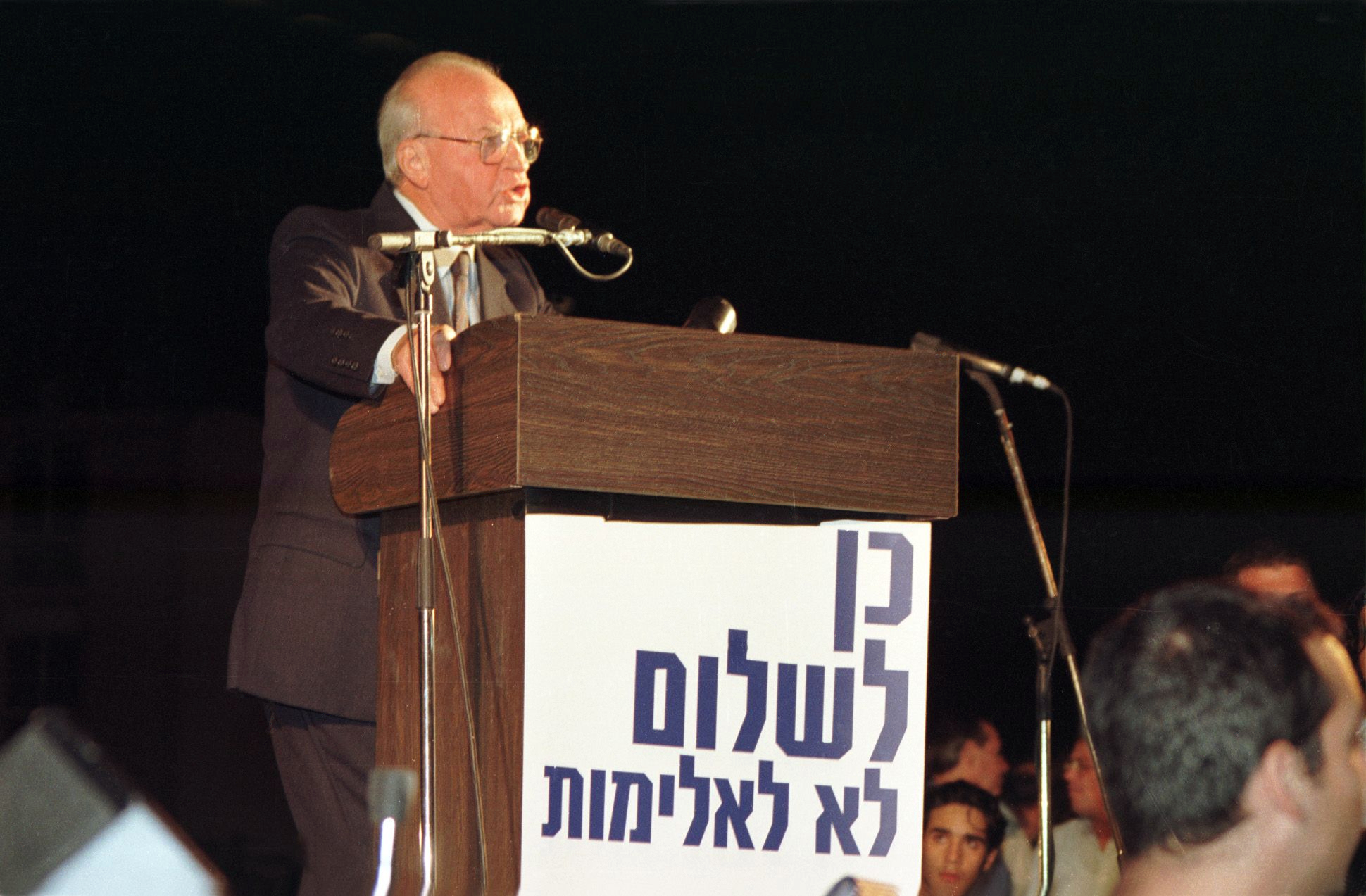
Rabin delivering his speech at the 4 November 1995 rally, shortly before his assassination

Short video about Yitzhak Rabin from the Israeli News Company

On the evening of 4 November 1995 (12th of Heshvan 5756 on the Hebrew calendar), Rabin was assassinated by Yigal Amir, a law student and right-wing extremist who opposed the signing of the Oslo Accords. Rabin had been attending a mass rally at the Kings of Israel Square in Tel Aviv, held in support of the Oslo Accords. When the rally ended, Rabin walked down the city hall steps towards the open door of his car, at which point Amir fired three shots at Rabin with a semi-automatic pistol. Two shots hit Rabin, and the third lightly injured Yoram Rubin, one of Rabin's bodyguards. Rabin was taken to the nearby Ichilov Hospital, where he died on the operating table of blood loss and two punctured lungs. Amir was immediately seized by Rabin's bodyguards and police. He was later tried, found guilty, and sentenced to life imprisonment. After an emergency cabinet meeting, foreign minister Shimon Peres was appointed as acting prime minister.

Rabin's assassination shocked the Israeli public and much of the rest of the world. Hundreds of thousands of Israelis gathered at the square where Rabin was assassinated to mourn his death. Young people, in particular, turned out in large numbers, lighting memorial candles and singing peace songs. On 6 November 1995, he was buried on Mount Herzl. Rabin's funeral was attended by many world leaders, among them U.S. president Bill Clinton, Australian Prime Minister Paul Keating, Egyptian president Hosni Mubarak, and King Hussein of Jordan. Clinton delivered a eulogy whose final words were in Hebrew – "Shalom, haver" (Hebrew: שלום חבר, lit. 'Goodbye, friend').

The Kings of Israel Square was subsequently renamed Rabin Square in his honor. Many other streets and public institutions in Israel have also subsequently been named after him. After his assassination, Rabin was hailed as a national symbol and came to embody the ethos of the "Israeli peace camp", despite his military career and hawkish views earlier in life. In November 2000, his wife Leah died and was buried alongside him.

After the murder, it was revealed that Avishai Raviv, a well-known right-wing extremist at the time, was a Shin Bet agent-informer codenamed Champagne. Raviv was later acquitted in court of charges that he failed to prevent the assassination. The court ruled there was no evidence that Raviv knew Amir was plotting to kill Rabin. After Rabin's assassination, his daughter Dalia Rabin-Pelossof entered politics and was elected to the Knesset in 1999 as part of the Center Party. In 2001, she served as Israel's deputy minister of defense.

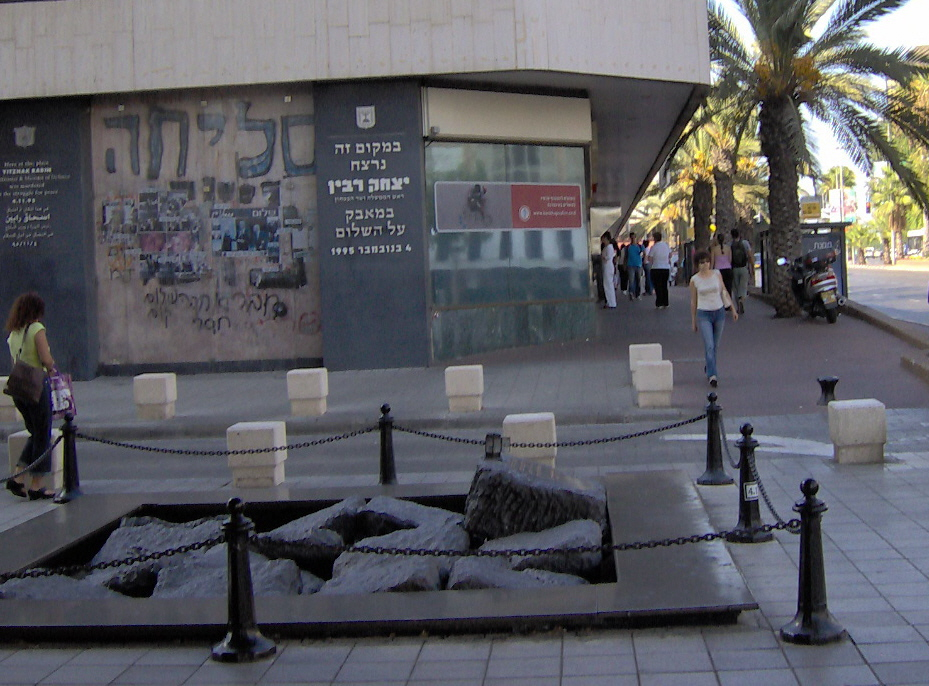
Monument marking the site of the assassination: Ibn Gabirol Street between Tel Aviv City Hall and Gan Ha'ir

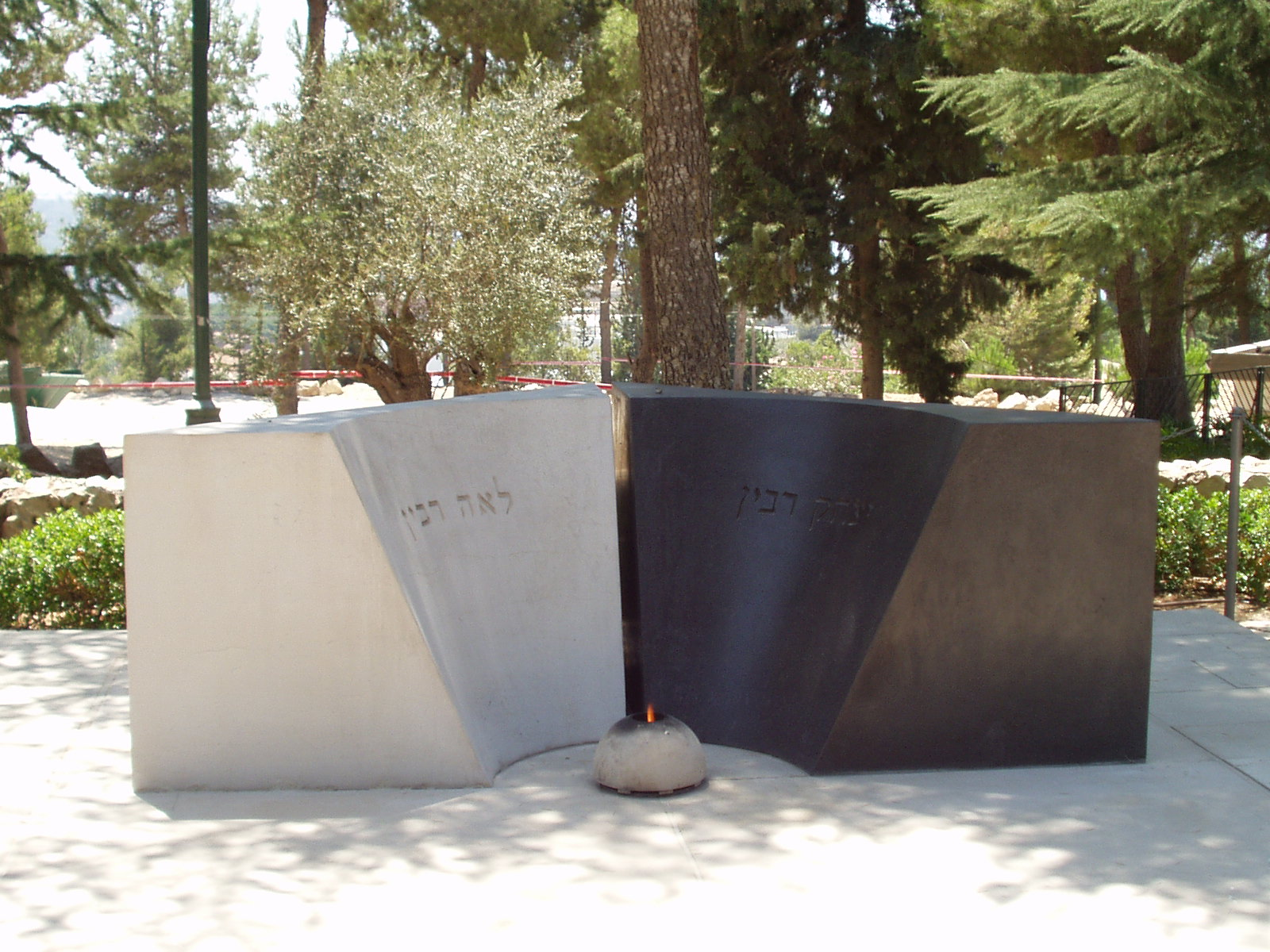
Graves of Yitzhak (right) and Leah Rabin (left) on Mount Herzl

== Commemoration ==
- The Knesset has set the 12th of Cheshvan, the murder date according to the Hebrew calendar, as the official memorial day of Rabin.
- In 1995 the Israeli Postal Authority issued a commemorative Rabin stamp.
- In 1996 Israeli songwriter Naomi Shemer translated Walt Whitman's poem "O Captain! My Captain!" to Hebrew and wrote music for it to mark the anniversary of Rabin's assassination. The song is since commonly performed or played in Yitzhak Rabin memorial day services.
- The Yitzhak Rabin Centre was founded in 1997 by an act of the Knesset, to create "[a] Memorial Centre for Perpetuating the Memory of Yitzhak Rabin." It carries out extensive commemorative and educational activities emphasising the ways and means of democracy and peace.
- Mechinat Rabin, an Israeli pre-army preparatory program for training recent high school graduates in leadership prior to their IDF service, was established in 1998.
- In 2005 Rabin received the Dr. Rainer Hildebrandt Human Rights Award endowed by Alexandra Hildebrandt. The award is given annually in recognition of extraordinary, non-violent commitment to human rights.
- Many cities and towns in Israel have named streets, neighbourhoods, schools, bridges and parks after Rabin. The country's largest power station, Orot Rabin, two government office complexes (at the HaKirya in Tel Aviv and the Sail Tower in Haifa), the Israeli terminal of the Arava/Araba border crossing with Jordan, and two synagogues are also named after him. Outside Israel, there are streets and squares named after him in Bonn, Berlin, Chicago, Madrid, Miami, New York City, and Odesa and parks in Montreal, Paris, Rome and Lima. The community Jewish high school in Ottawa is also named after him.
- Since 2005, the Elie Wiesel Center for Jewish Studies at Boston University hostes an annual Yitzhak Rabin Lecture.
- The Cambridge University Israel Society hosts its annual academic lecture in honour of Yitzhak Rabin
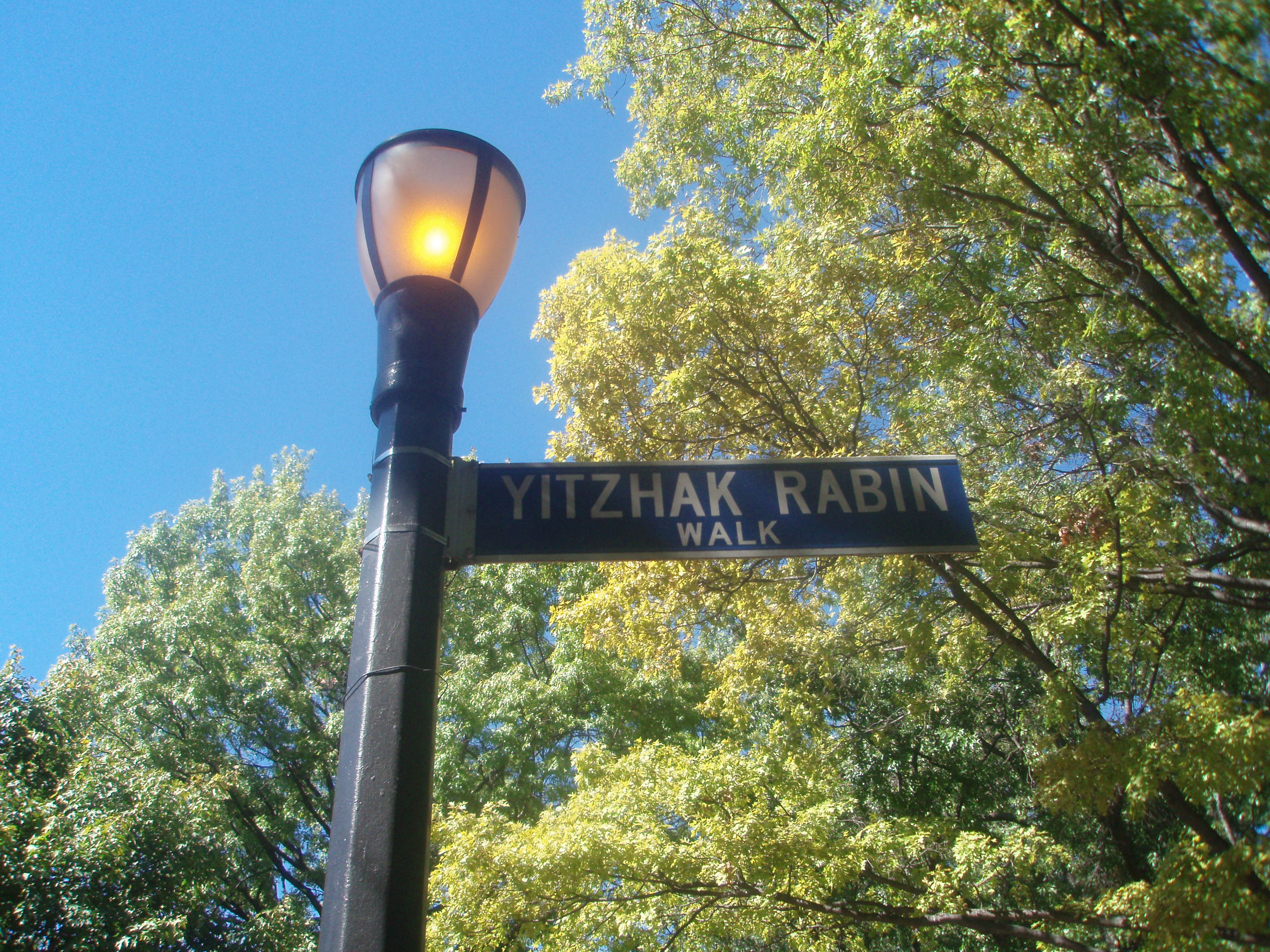
Yitzhak Rabin Walk in Queens, New York City

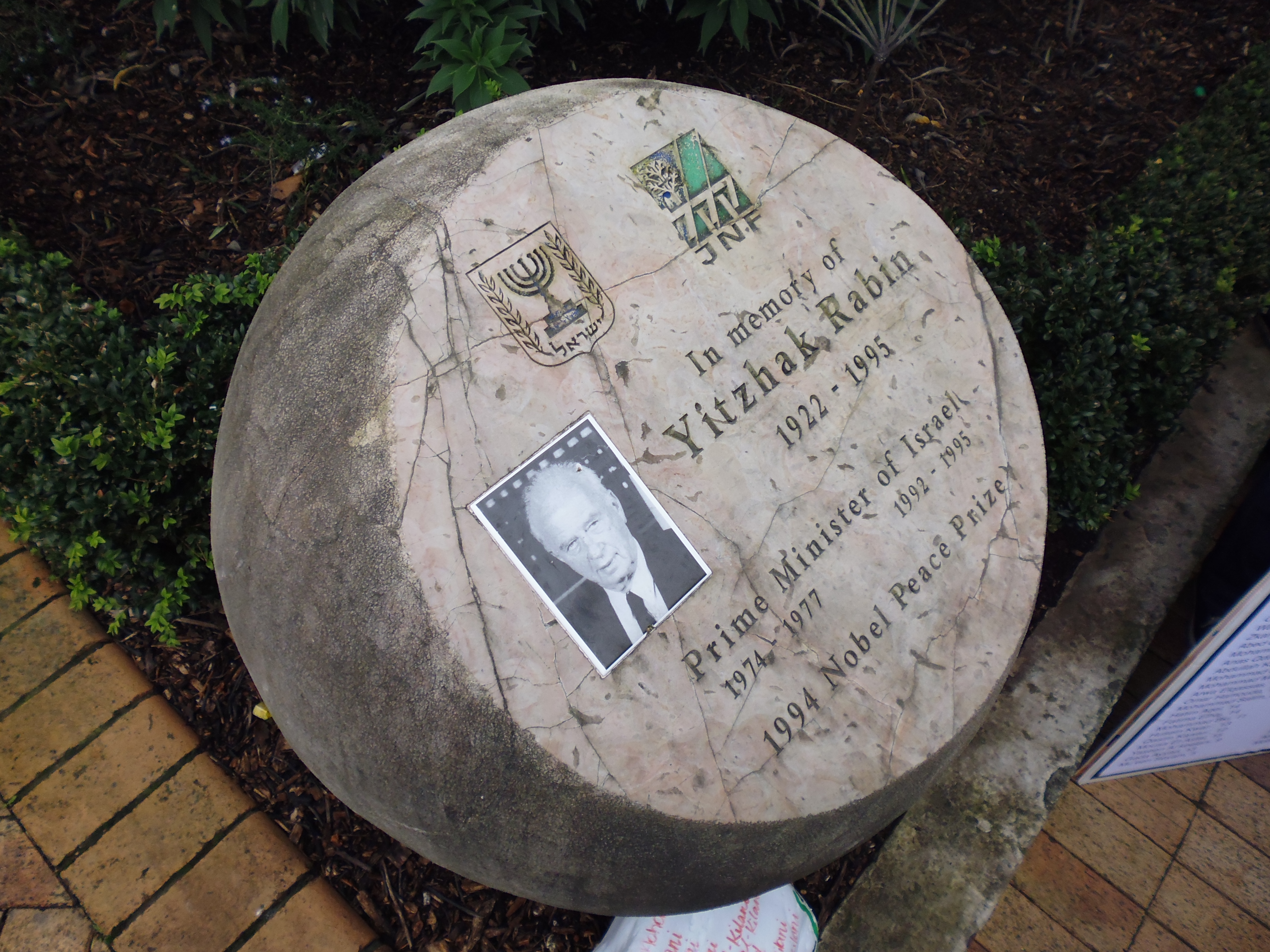
A memorial stone honouring Rabin in Wellington, New Zealand

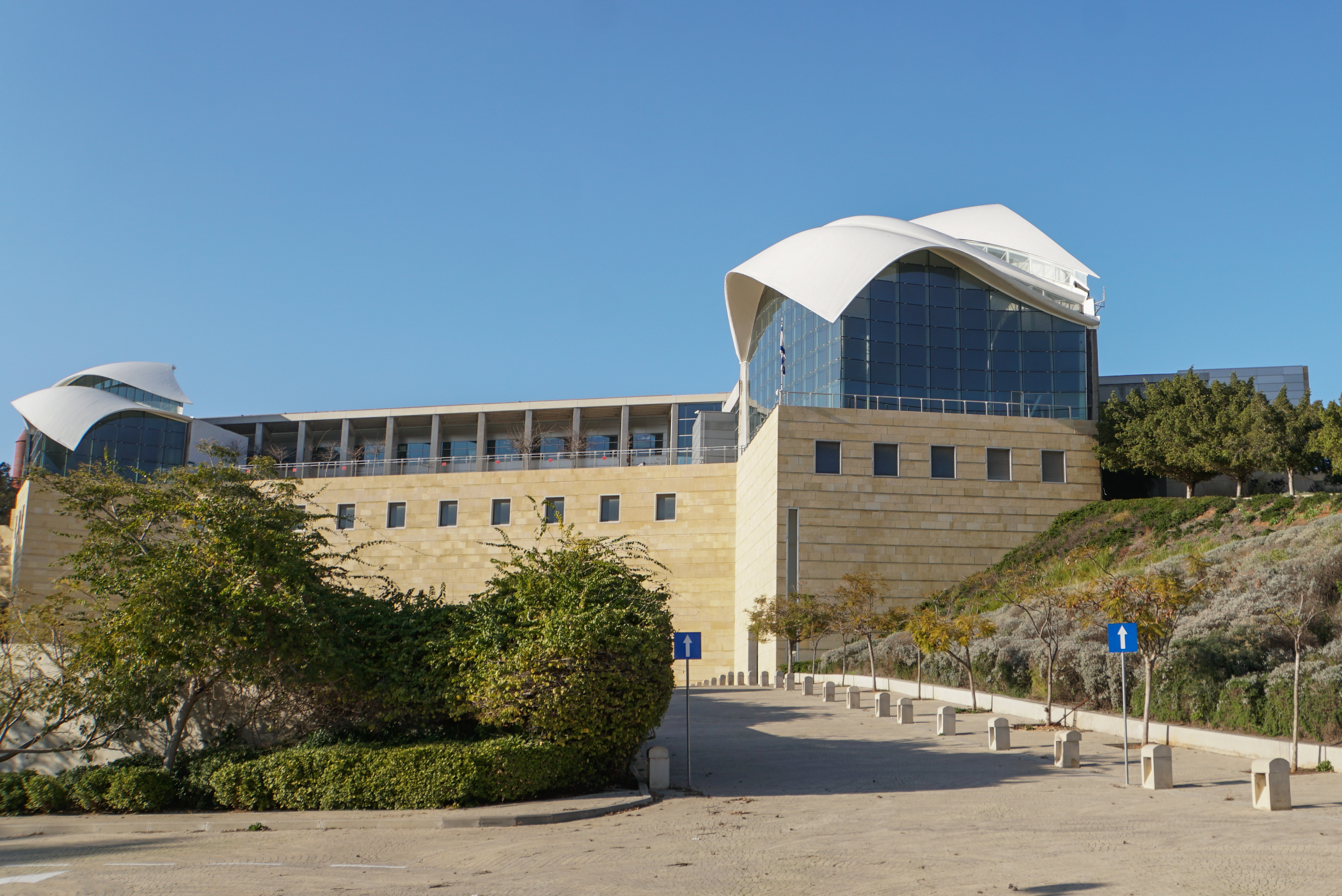
Yitzhak Rabin Center

== Overview of offices held ==
Rabin twice served as prime minister (Israel's head of government). His first stint spanned from 3 June 1974 through 20 June 1977, leading the 17th government during the 8th Knesset. His second stint lasted from 13 July 1992 until his assassination on 4 November 1995, leading the 25th government during the 13th Knesset. Rabin was a member of the Knesset from 1974 until his assassination. For several months in 1992, Rabin served as the Knesset's opposition leader, at the time an unofficial and honorary role. Rabin also served as ambassador of Israel to the United States from 1968 until 1973.

=== Labor Party leadership ===
Rabin twice served as leader of the Israeli Labor Party.

Tenures as Labor Party leader
Tenure	Predecessor	Successor	Knesset elections as leader	Elected/reelected as leader
June 1974 – June 1977	Golda Meir	Shimon Peres		1974, 1977 (Feb)
February 1992 – 4 November 1995	Shimon Peres	Shimon Peres	1992	1992

=== Ministerial posts ===
Ministerial posts
Ministerial post	Tenure	Prime Minister(s)	Government(s)	Predecessor	Successor
Minister of Labour	10 March – 3 June 1974	Golda Meir	16	Yosef Almogi	Moshe Baram
Minister of Communications	3 June 1974 – 20 March 1975	Yitzhak Rabin	17	Aharon Uzan	Aharon Uzan
Minister of Welfare (first tenure)	7 – 29 July 1975	Yitzhak Rabin	17	Michael Hasani	Yosef Burg
Minister of Defense (first tenure)	13 September 1984 – 20 March 1990	Shimon Peres (until 20 October 1986); Yitzhak Shamir (after 20 October 1986)	21, 22, 23	Moshe Arens	Yitzhak Shamir
Minister of Defense (second tenure)	13 July 1992 – 4 November 1995	Yitzhak Rabin	25	Moshe Arens	Shimon Peres
Minister of Labor and Social Welfare (second tenure)	13 July – 31 December 1992	Yitzhak Rabin	25	Yitzhak Shamir	Ora Namir
Minister of Jerusalem Affairs	13 July – 31 December 1992	Yitzhak Rabin	25	Yitzhak Shamir	Eli Suissa
Minister of Religious Affairs	13 July 1992 – 27 February 1995	Yitzhak Rabin	25	Avner Shaki	Shimon Shetreet
Minister of Education and Culture	11 May – 7 June 1993	Yitzhak Rabin	25	Shulamit Aloni	Amnon Rubinstein
Minister of Internal Affairs (first tenure)	11 May – 7 June 1993	Yitzhak Rabin	25	Aryeh Deri	Aryeh Deri
Minister of Internal Affairs (second tenure)	14 September 1993 – 27 February 1995	Yitzhak Rabin	25	Aryeh Deri	Uzi Baram
Minister of Health	8 February – 1 June 1994	Yitzhak Rabin	25	Haim Ramon	Efraim Sneh

== Electoral history ==
=== Party leadership elections ===
1974 Israeli Labor Party leadership election
Candidate	Votes	%
Yitzhak Rabin	298	54
Shimon Peres	254	46
Total votes	552	100

February 1977 Israeli Labor Party leadership election
Candidate	Votes	%
Yitzhak Rabin (incumbent)	1,445	50.7
Shimon Peres	1,404	49.3
Total votes	1,997	100

1980 Israeli Labor Party leadership election
Candidate	Votes	%
Shimon Peres (incumbent)	2,123	70.8
Yitzhak Rabin	875	29.2
Total votes	2,998	100

1992 Israeli Labor Party leadership election
Candidate	Votes	%
Yizhak Rabin		40.6
Shimon Peres (incumbent)		34.5
Yisrael Kessar		19.0
Ora Namir		5.5
Total votes	108,347	100
Turnout		70.1%

== Awards and decorations ==

War of Independence Ribbon	Operation Kadesh Ribbon	Six-Day War Ribbon

== Published works ==
- Rabin, Yitzhak (1996). The Rabin Memoirs. University of California Press. ISBN 978-0-520-20766-0.

== See also ==
- List of heads of state and government who were assassinated or executed
- List of Israeli Nobel laureates
- List of Jewish Nobel laureates
- Kempler video, assassination of Yitzhak Rabin video
- Shir LaShalom, the "Peace Song" sung by Rabin at the peace rally shortly before his assassination

== Sources ==
- Avner, Yehuda (2010). The Prime Ministers: An Intimate Narrative of Israeli Leadership. Toby Press. ISBN 978-1-59264-278-6. OCLC 758724969.
- Ben Artzi-Pelossof, Noa (1997). In the Name of Sorrow and Hope. Random House Large Print. ISBN 978-0-517-17963-5.
- Benedikt, Linda (2005). Yitzhak Rabin: The Battle for Peace. Haus Books. ISBN 978-1-904950-06-6.
- Cleveland, William I. (1994). A History of the Modern Middle East. Westview Press.
- Ephron, Dan (2015). Killing a King: The Assassination of Yitzhak Rabin and the Remaking of Israel. W. W. Norton & Company. ISBN 978-0-393-24209-6.
- Gresh, Alain; Vidal, Dominique (2004). The New A to Z of the Middle East. I.B. Tauris.
- Horowitz, David, ed. (1996). Yitzhak Rabin: Soldier of Peace. Peter Halban.
- Horowitz, David, ed. (1996). Shalom, Friend: The Life and Legacy of Yitzhak Rabin. New York: Newmarket Press. ISBN 978-1-55704-287-3.
- Inbar, Efraim (1999). Rabin and Israel National Security. Woodrow Wilson Press.
- Kurzman, Dan (1998). Soldier of Peace: The Life of Yitzhak Rabin 1922–1995. Harper Collins. ISBN 978-0-06-018684-5.
- Milstein, Uri (1999). The Rabin File. Gefen. ISBN 978-965-229-196-7.
- Pappe, Ilan (2004). A History of Modern Palestine. Cambridge University Press.
- Quigley, John (2004). The Case for Palestine: The International Law Perspective. Duke University Press.
- Rabin, Leah (1997). Rabin: Our Life, His Legacy. New York : G.P. Putnam's Sons. ISBN 978-0-399-14217-8.
- Shlaim, Avi (2000). The Iron Wall: Israel and the Arab World. Penguin Books.
- Slater, Robert (2015). Rabin: 20 Years After. Kotarim International Publishing. ISBN 978-9-657-58913-7.
- Slater, Robert (1993). Rabin of Israel. Robson Books.
- Smith, Charles D. (2004). Palestine and the Arab-Israeli Conflict (5th ed.). Macmillan Press.
- Sorek, Tamir (2015). Palestinian Commemoration in Israel: Calendars, Monuments, and Martyrs. Stanford, CA: Stanford University Press. pp. 217–32. ISBN 978-0-8047-9518-0.
- Sprinzak, Ehud (2000), Yoram Peri (ed.), "Israeli Radical Right", The Association of Yitzhak Rabin, Stanford University Press
- Tessler, Mark (1974). A History of the Israeli-Palestinian Conflict. Indiana University Press.

Party political offices
Preceded by Golda Meir	Leader of the Alignment; 1973–1977	Succeeded by Shimon Peres
Preceded by Shimon Peres	Leader of the Labor Party; 1992–1995	Succeeded by Shimon Peres
Awards
Preceded by Colin Powell	The Ronald Reagan Freedom Award; 1994	Succeeded by King Hussein I
