= Party lists for the 1999 Israeli general election =

The 1999 Israeli general election was held using closed list proportional representation. Each party presented a list of candidates to the Central Elections Committee prior to the election.

== One Israel ==
One Israel, a joint list of the Israeli Labor Party, Gesher and Meimad, was led by Ehud Barak.

1. Ehud Barak
2. Shimon Peres
3. David Levy
4. Shlomo Ben-Ami
5. Yossi Beilin
6. Matan Vilnai
7. Avraham Burg
8. Raanan Cohen
9. Uzi Baram
10. Dalia Itzik
11. Binyamin Ben-Eliezer
12. Haim Ramon
13. Eli Goldschmidt
14. Avraham Shochat
15. Yael Dayan
16. Ofir Pines-Paz
17. Michael Melchior
18. Maxim Levy
19. Ephraim Sneh
20. Nawaf Massalha
21. Avraham Yehezkel
22. Sofa Landver
23. Salah Tarif
24. Shalom Simhon
25. Yossi Katz
26. Weizman Shiry
27. Eli Ben-Menachem
28. Colette Avital
29. Mordechai Mishani
30. Efi Oshaya
31. Micha Goldman
32. Eitan Cabel
33. Yehuda Gilad
34. Orit Noked
35. Tzali Reshef
36. Eli Dayan
37. Glila Horenstein
38. Yonina Falenberg
39. Omer Mordechai
40. Shevah Weiss
41. Yael Aran
42. Avraham Hemo
43. Issam Haddad
44. Yoel Iffergan
45. Rivka Barlev
46. Shula-Shulamit Cohen
47. Yamin Suisssa
48. Suriya Nujidat
49. Adi Hadar
50. Yisrael Ben-Yehuda
51. Nissim Suzette
52. Mordechai Motel
53. Yosef Vanunu
54. Yariv Oppenheimer
55. Yaakov Navon
56. Lama Lijishael
57. Ram Haruvi
58. Eli Elizabeth Aloni
59. Shmuel Kashless
60. Adir Abu-Siam

== Likud ==
The Likud list was led by Benjamin Netanyahu.

1. Benjamin Netanyahu
2. Silvan Shalom
3. Moshe Katsav
4. Limor Livnat
5. Meir Sheetrit
6. Gideon Ezra
7. Naomi Blumenthal
8. Ariel Sharon
9. Uzi Landau
10. Reuven Rivlin
11. Danny Naveh
12. Tzachi Hanegbi
13. Israel Katz
14. Michael Eitan
15. Yehoshua Matza
16. Moshe Arens
17. Avraham Hirschson
18. Tzipi Livni
19. Ayoob Kara
20. Yuval Steinitz
21. Ze'ev Boim
22. Shaul Amor
23. Eli Cohen
24. Zeev Geyzel
25. Gila Gamliel
26. Gilad Erdan
27. David Mena
28. Avi Ben-Abraham
29. Liat Yonit Revner
30. Yosef Ahimeir
31. Michael Ratzon
32. Doron Shmueli
33. Assad Assad
34. Zehava Rokach-Cohen
35. Yehiel Hazan
36. Eli Aflalo
37. Amram Ben-Nizri
38. Moshe Kachlon
39. Yosef Goldberg
40. David Even Tsur
41. David Bitan
42. Alali Adamso
43. Tzila Tamir
44. Tsefania Barzilay
45. Rami Rahamim Haddad

== Shas ==
The Shas list was led by Aryeh Deri.

1. Aryeh Deri
2. Aryeh Gamliel
3. Eliyahu Suissa
4. Eli Yishai
5. Shlomo Benizri
6. Yitzhak Cohen
7. Amnon Cohen
8. Nissim Dahan
9. David Azulai
10. David Tal
11. Yitzhak Vaknin
12. Rahamim Malul
13. Meshulam Nahari
14. Yitzhak Saban
15. Nissim Ze'ev
16. Yair Peretz
17. Ofer Hugi
18. Isaak Galguella
19. Pinhas Tzabari
20. David Telkar
21. Mazor Bahaina
22. Shmuel Ben-Atar
23. Yoav Ben-Tzur
24. Rahamim Arbel
25. Avigdor Ohana
26. Benny Elbaz
27. Aryeh Cohen
28. Jillbert Hayat
29. Sasson Aharoni
30. Mordechai Sudri
31. Gideon Eliassi
32. Amir Krispal
33. Rafael Barnez
34. Amram Ivgi
35. Yaakov Elhadad

== Meretz ==
The Meretz list was led by Yossi Sarid.

1. Yossi Sarid
2. Ran Cohen
3. Haim Oron
4. Amnon Rubinstein
5. Anat Maor
6. Zehava Galon
7. Avshalom Vilan
8. Ilan Gilon
9. Naomi Chazan
10. Hussniya Jabara
11. Mossi Raz
12. Binyamin Temkin
13. Uzi Even
14. Michat Shochat
15. Ali Al-Assad
16. Ofer Sheetrit
17. Gaby Lasky
18. Anat Michal Hoffman
19. Ernesto Kahan
20. Shimrit Or

== Yisrael BaAliyah ==
The Yisrael BaAliyah list was led by Natan Sharansky.

1. Natan Sharansky
2. Yuli Edelstein
3. Roman Bronfman
4. Marina Solodkin
5. Gennady Riger
6. Alexander Tzinker
7. Natalya Yelinson
8. Shlomo Molla
9. Yonatan Misheyev
10. Vova Bitao
11. Ilya Khrakover
12. Evgeny Malmud
13. Yuri Menger
14. Baruch Davyttov
15. Moshe Borochov

== Shinui ==
The Shinui list was led by Tommy Lapid.

1. Tommy Lapid
2. Avraham Poraz
3. Yehudit Naot
4. Yosef Paritzky
5. Eliezer Sandberg
6. Victor Brailovsky
7. Ilan Shalgi
8. Ehud Rassabi
9. Meli Polishook-Bloch
10. Esther Niva Lev
11. Reshef Hen
12. Margarita Reiss
13. Ilan Leibovitch
14. Hemi Doron
15. Shlomo Yosefsberg

== Center Party ==
The Center Party list was led by Yitzhak Mordechai.

1. Yitzhak Mordechai
2. Amnon Lipkin-Shahak
3. Dan Meridor
4. Roni Milo
5. Uri Savir
6. Dalia Rabin-Pelossof
7. Nehama Ronen
8. David Magen
9. Yehiel Lasri
10. Hagai Meirom
11. Svetlana Alexandrov
12. Benny Biton
13. Emmanuella Dviri
14. Eran Vintraub
15. Shmuel Slavin

== National Religious Party ==
The National Religious Party list was led by Yitzhak Levy.

1. Yitzhak Levy
2. Haim Drukman
3. Shaul Yahalom
4. Yigal Bibi
5. Zevulun Orlev
6. Nahum Langental
7. Nissan Slomiansky
8. Gila Finkelstein
9. Eliyahu Gabai
10. Shmaryahu Ben-Tzur
11. Asher Abergel
12. Yehudit Shilat
13. Rachel Silvetsky
14. Mordechai Vaknin
15. Leah Sivan

== United Torah Judaism ==
The United Torah Judaism list was led by Meir Porush.

1. Meir Porush
2. Avraham Ravitz
3. Yaakov Litzman
4. Moshe Gafni
5. Shmuel Halpert
6. Israel Eichler
7. Yahya Turgeman
8. Yosef Verdiger
9. Zvi Boimel
10. Avraham Getter

== Ra'am ==
The Ra'am list was led by Abdulmalik Dehamshe.

1. Abdulmalik Dehamshe
2. Taleb el-Sana
3. Hashem Mahameed
4. Tawfik Khatib
5. Muhamad Kanan
6. Ibrahim Alamour
7. Fadel Na'amana
8. Muhammad Abu-Ful
9. Hassan Gawwi
10. Mahsan Kais

== National Union ==
The National Union, a joint list by Moledet, Tkuma and Herut, was led by Benny Begin.

1. Benny Begin
2. Rehavam Ze'evi
3. Hanan Porat
4. Michael Kleiner
5. Binyamin Elon
6. Zvi Hendel
7. Uri Ariel
8. Moshe Peled
9. Moshe Peretz
10. Menachem Felix

== Hadash ==
The Hadash list was led by Mohammad Barakeh.

1. Mohammad Barakeh
2. Issam Makhoul
3. Tamar Gozansky
4. Afu Agbaria
5. Walid Fahoum
6. Youssef Atauna
7. Ilan Pappé
8. Binyamin Gonen
9. Rodina Jarissi
10. Naifa Nafa'a

== Yisrael Beitenu ==
The Yisrael Beiteinu list was led by Avigdor Lieberman.

1. Avigdor Lieberman
2. Yuri Stern
3. Michael Nudelman
4. Eliezer Cohen
5. Esterina Tartman
6. Ori Ohonov
7. Nina Martinenko
8. Rami Cohen
9. Mei-Tal Ori
10. Marina Shapiro
11. Avner Avneri
12. Isaschar Mekonnen
13. Avraham Yosef Frank
14. Roman Gisher
15. Ariel Bulstein
16. Moisi Zak
17. Alexander Latitchevsky
18. Avi Hen

== Balad ==
The Balad list was led by Azmi Bishara. The list was a joint list with the Ta'al party.

1. Azmi Bishara
2. Ahmad Tibi
3. Jamal Zahalka
4. Said Nafa
5. Ahmad Nasser

== One Nation ==
The One Nation list was led by Amir Peretz.

1. Amir Peretz
2. Haim Katz
3. Yoram Overkovitch
4. Adisu Massala
5. Kfir Shalma
6. Nadia Hilou
7. Haim Tswig
8. Louis Rott
9. Yitzhak Moyal
10. Leon Mazorovsky

== Extraparliamentary parties ==
The following are parties which won no seats in the 1999 election.

=== Pnina Rosenblum ===
The Pnina Rosenblum list was led by Pnina Rosenblum.

1. Pnina Rosenblum
2. Avi Balashnikov
3. Masha Lubelsky
4. Galya Elvin
5. Moshe Moskowitz
6. Edna Shani
7. Nava Kol
8. Yaakov Omrad
9. Gizzel Cohen
10. Boaz Sharkansky

=== Power for Pensioners ===
The Power for Pensioners list was led by Gideon Ben-Yisrael.

1. Gideon Ben-Yisrael
2. Golan Yoffe
3. Avishay Lickerman
4. Mordechai Virshubski
5. Yisrael Shmerling

=== Ale Yarok ===
The Ale Yarok list was led by Boaz Wachtel.

1. Boaz Wachtel
2. Shmuel Lavi Sandak
3. Gabriel Levy
4. Yedidia Rafiq
5. Ben Zeidel

=== Third Way ===
The Third Way list was led by Avigdor Kahalani.

1. Avigdor Kahalani
2. Malka Eliyahu
3. Yehuda Harel
4. Ehud Gross
5. David Miriyam

=== The Greens ===
The 'The Greens' list was led by David Zucker.

1. David Zucker
2. Pe'er Visner
3. Irit Rosenblum
4. Shmuel Haim
5. Hagai Aide

=== Tikva ===
The Tikva list was led by Alexander Tentser.

1. Alexander Tentser
2. Vyacheslav Primessler
3. Simon Shapiro
4. Yitzhak Rozavsky
5. Mark Davydov
6. Lev Vaserblei
7. Yaakov Krut

=== Casino Party ===
The Casino Party list was led by Ezra Tinosa.

1. Ezra Tinosa
2. Nissim Frajun
3. Ron Feldman
4. Billy Weizmann
5. Moshe Shalom
6. Yehoshua Mor
7. Avraham Weizmann

=== Lev LaOlim ===
The Lev LaOlim list was led by Ovadia Fathoov.

1. Ovadia Fathoov
2. Yehoshua Leib
3. Harazi Guram
4. Yury Elaiev

=== Negev Party ===
The Negev Party list was led by Rina Ramot.

1. Rina Ramot
2. Moshe Zaguri
3. Khalil Abu-Raviyya
4. Yan Peres
5. Daniel Gertner

=== Tzomet ===
The Tzomet list was led by Rafael Eitan.

1. Rafael Eitan
2. Haim Adini
3. Haim Dayan
4. Moshe Zvi Rumam
5. Vered Swid

=== Natural Law Party ===
The Natural Law Party list was led by Reuven Zelinovsky.

1. Reuven Zelinovsky
2. Dorit Goldschmidt
3. Daniel Glicker
4. Ori Idan
5. Yosef Shimoni

=== Progressive Center Party ===
The Progressive Center Party list was led by Adrian Yonovich.

1. Adrian Yonovich
2. Yehuda Maor
3. Daniel Igon
4. Aharon Yitzhak
5. Madlan Perlman

=== Da'am ===
The Da'am list was led by Khatib Samia.

1. Khatib Samia
2. Wahabba Badrana
3. Asma Agbarieh
4. Assaf Adiv
5. Hussein Abd Al-Majid

=== New Arab Party ===
The New Arab Party list was led by Makram Khouli.

1. Makram Khouli
2. Samer Mavjish
3. Asma Abu-Wassem
4. Walid Mansour
5. Wafa Abu-Ras

=== Justice For All ===
The Justice For All list was led by Yaakov Schlusser.

1. Yaakov Schlusser
2. Ruham Herzl
3. Dan Nissim Sangra
4. Alunura Blanc
5. Shimon Nazri

=== Moreshet Avot ===
The Moreshet Avot list was led by Yosef Ba-Gad.

1. Yosef Ba-Gad
2. Moshe Kablan
3. Asher Aiden
4. Shlomo Gross
5. Avraham Mordechai Shinobar
