= List of members of the fifteenth Knesset =

The 120 members of the fifteenth Knesset were elected on 17 May 1999. The breakdown by party was as follows:

- One Israel: 26
- Likud: 19
- Shas: 17
- Meretz: 10
- Yisrael BaAliyah: 6
- Shinui: 6
- Centre Party: 6
- National Religious Party: 5
- United Torah Judaism: 5
- United Arab List: 5
- National Union: 4
- Hadash: 3
- Yisrael Beiteinu: 4
- Balad: 2
- One Nation: 2

== List of members ==
Party	MK	Notes
One Israel	Ehud Barak	Resigned from Knesset and replaced by Eitan Cabel on 9 March 2001.
One Israel	Shimon Peres	
One Israel	David Levy	Left One Israel to make Gesher an independent party
One Israel	Shlomo Ben-Ami	Resigned from Knesset and replaced by Orit Noked on 11 August 2002.
One Israel	Yossi Beilin	Resigned from Knesset and replaced by Eli Ben-Menachem on 17 November 1999
One Israel	Matan Vilnai	Resigned from Knesset and replaced by Colette Avital on 17 November 1999
One Israel	Avraham Burg	
One Israel	Ra'anan Cohen	Resigned from Knesset and replaced by Tzali Reshef on 21 August 2002
One Israel	Uzi Baram	Resigned from Knesset and replaced by Efi Oshaya on 15 February 2001.
One Israel	Dalia Itzik	
One Israel	Binyamin Ben-Eliezer	
One Israel	Haim Ramon	
One Israel	Eli Goldschmidt	Resigned from Knesset and replaced by Mordechai Mishani on 15 February 2001.
One Israel	Avraham Shochat	
One Israel	Yael Dayan	
One Israel	Ophir Pines-Paz	
One Israel	Michael Melchior	
One Israel	Maxim Levy	Left One Israel to make Gesher an independent party. Resigned from Knesset and replaced by Yehuda Gilad on 5 June 2002.
One Israel	Efraim Sneh	
One Israel	Nawaf Massalha	
One Israel	Avi Yehezkel	
One Israel	Sofa Landver	
One Israel	Salah Tarif	
One Israel	Shalom Simhon	
One Israel	Yossi Katz	
One Israel	Weizman Shiri	
Likud	Binyamin Netanyahu	
Likud	Silvan Shalom	
Likud	Moshe Katsav	Resigned from Knesset and replaced by Ze'ev Boim on 31 July 2000.
Likud	Limor Livnat	
Likud	Meir Sheetrit	
Likud	Gideon Ezra	
Likud	Naomi Blumenthal	
Likud	Ariel Sharon	
Likud	Uzi Landau	
Likud	Reuven Rivlin	
Likud	Dan Naveh	
Likud	Tzachi Hanegbi	
Likud	Yisrael Katz	
Likud	Michael Eitan	
Likud	Joshua Matza	Resigned from Knesset and replaced by Eli Cohen on 22 February 2002.
Likud	Moshe Arens	
Likud	Avraham Hirschson	
Likud	Tzipi Livni	
Likud	Ayoub Kara	
Shas	Aryeh Gamliel	
Shas	Eli Suissa	
Shas	Eli Yishai	
Shas	Shlomo Benizri	
Shas	Yitzhak Cohen	
Shas	Amnon Cohen	
Shas	Nissim Dahan	
Shas	David Azulai	
Shas	David Tal	Resigned from Knesset and replaced by Pinhas Tzabari on 14 November 2002.
Shas	Yitzhak Vaknin	
Shas	Rahamim Malul	
Shas	Meshulam Nahari	
Shas	Yitzhak Saban	
Shas	Nissim Ze'ev	
Shas	Yair Peretz	
Shas	Ofer Hugi	
Shas	Yitzhak Gagula	
Meretz	Yossi Sarid	
Meretz	Ran Cohen	
Meretz	Haim Oron	Resigned from Knesset and replaced by Mossi Raz on 25 February 2000.
Meretz	Amnon Rubinstein	Resigned from Knesset and replaced by Uzi Even on 31 October 2002.
Meretz	Anat Maor	
Meretz	Zehava Gal-On	
Meretz	Avshalom Vilan	
Meretz	Ilan Gilon	
Meretz	Naomi Chazan	
Meretz	Hussniya Jabara	
Yisrael BaAliyah	Natan Sharansky	
Yisrael BaAliyah	Yuli-Yoel Edelstein	
Yisrael BaAliyah	Roman Bronfman	Left party to establish Democratic Choice on 20 July 1999.
Yisrael BaAliyah	Marina Solodkin	
Yisrael BaAliyah	Gennady Riger	
Yisrael BaAliyah	Alexander Tzinker	Left party to establish Democratic Choice on 20 July 1999.
Shinui	Tommy Lapid	
Shinui	Avraham Poraz	
Shinui	Yehudit Naot	
Shinui	Yosef Paritzky	
Shinui	Eliezer Sandberg	
Shinui	Victor Brailovsky	
Centre Party	Yitzhak Mordechai	Resigned from Knesset on 28 March 2001 and replaced by Yehiel Lasri.
Centre Party	Amnon Lipkin-Shahak	Left party to form New Way on 6 March 2001. Resigned from Knesset on 8 March 2001 and replaced by Nehama Ronen.
Centre Party	Dan Meridor	
Centre Party	Roni Milo	Left party to form Lev and then joined Likud on 6 November.
Centre Party	Uri Savir	Left party to form New Way on 6 March 2001. Resigned from Knesset on 8 March 2001 and replaced by David Magen.
Centre Party	Dalia Rabin-Pelossof	Left party to form New Way on 6 March 2001. New Way merged into One Israel on 7 May 2001.
National Religious Party	Yitzhak Levy	Resigned from Knesset and replaced by Nahum Langental on 15 July 1999.
National Religious Party	Haim Drukman	
National Religious Party	Shaul Yahalom	
National Religious Party	Yigal Bibi	
National Religious Party	Zevulun Orlev	
United Torah Judaism	Meir Porush	
United Torah Judaism	Avraham Ravitz	
United Torah Judaism	Ya'akov Litzman	
United Torah Judaism	Moshe Gafni	
United Torah Judaism	Shmuel Halpert	
United Arab List	Abdulmalik Dehamshe	
United Arab List	Taleb el-Sana	
United Arab List	Hashem Mahameed	Left party to form National Unity – National Progressive Alliance on 10 December 2002
United Arab List	Tawfik Khatib	Left party to form Arab National Party on 19 February 2001
United Arab List	Muhamad Kanan	Left party to form Arab National Party on 19 February 2001
National Union	Rehavam Ze'evi	Assassinated on 17 October 2001. Replaced by Uri Ariel.
National Union	Hanan Porat	Resigned from Knesset and replaced by Zvi Hendel on 20 October 1999
National Union	Michael Kleiner	Left One Israel to make Herut - The National Movement an independent party
National Union	Binyamin Elon	
Hadash	Mohammad Barakeh	
Hadash	Issam Makhoul	
Hadash	Tamar Gozansky	
Yisrael Beiteinu	Avigdor Lieberman	
Yisrael Beiteinu	Yuri Stern	
Yisrael Beiteinu	Michael Nudelman	
Yisrael Beiteinu	Eliezer Cohen	
Balad	Azmi Bishara	
Balad	Ahmad Tibi	Left party to form Ta'al on 21 December 1999.
One Nation	Amir Peretz	
One Nation	Haim Katz	

=== Replacements ===
MK	Replaced	Date	Party	Notes
Yuval Steinitz	Binyamin Netanyahu	6 July 1999	Likud	
Nahum Langental	Yitzhak Levy	15 July 1999	National Religious Party	
Zvi Hendel	Hanan Porat	20 October 1999	National Union	
Eli Ben-Menachem	Yossi Beilin	17 November 1999	One Israel	
Colette Avital	Matan Vilnai	17 November 1999	One Israel	
Mossi Raz	Haim Oron	25 February 2000	Meretz	
Ze'ev Boim	Moshe Katsav	31 July 2000	Likud	
Mordechai Mishani	Eli Goldschmidt	15 February 2001	One Israel	Left One Israel to make Gesher an independent party
Efi Oshaya	Uzi Baram	15 February 2001	One Israel	
David Magen	Uri Savir	8 March 2001	Centre Party	
Nehama Ronen	Amnon Lipkin-Shahak	8 March 2001	Centre Party	
Eitan Cabel	Ehud Barak	9 March 2001	One Israel	
Yehiel Lasri	Yitzhak Mordechai	28 March 2001	Centre Party	Left party to form Lev and then joined Likud on 6 November.
Uri Ariel	Rehavam Ze'evi	17 October 2001	National Union	
Eli Cohen	Joshua Matza	22 February 2002	Likud	
Yehuda Gilad	Maxim Levy	5 June 2002	One Israel	
Orit Noked	Shlomo Ben-Ami	11 August 2002	One Israel	
Tzali Reshef	Ra'anan Cohen	21 August 2002	One Israel	
Uzi Even	Amnon Rubinstein	31 October 2002	Meretz	
Pinhas Tzabari	David Tal	14 November 2002	Shas	
