= Nechama =

Nechama or Nehama (Hebrew: נחמה) is a Hebrew feminine given name literally meaning "consolation". Notable people with the name include:

- Nechama Hendel (1936–1998), Israeli singer
- Nechama Leibowitz (1905–1997), Israeli Bible scholar
- Nechama Lifshitz (1927–2017), Yiddish language and later Hebrew language soprano and art song performer
- Nechama Rivlin (1945–2019), Israeli researcher, science secretary, and First Lady of Israel
- Nehama Ronen (born 1961), Israeli politician
- Nechama Tec (1931–2023), Polish-American historian and sociologist
