= Gagula =

Gagula is a Serbo-Croatian masculine given name and surname. In Croatia, the surname is borne by Croats (majority) and Serbs (minority). It may refer to:

- Siniša Gagula (born 1984), Bosnian footballer
- Yitzhak Gagula (born 1964 as Gagulashvili), Israeli former politician
- Ivana Gagula, Swedish beauty pageant, Miss Sweden 2007
