= Yehoshua Matza =

Israeli politician (1931–2020)

- יהושע מצא
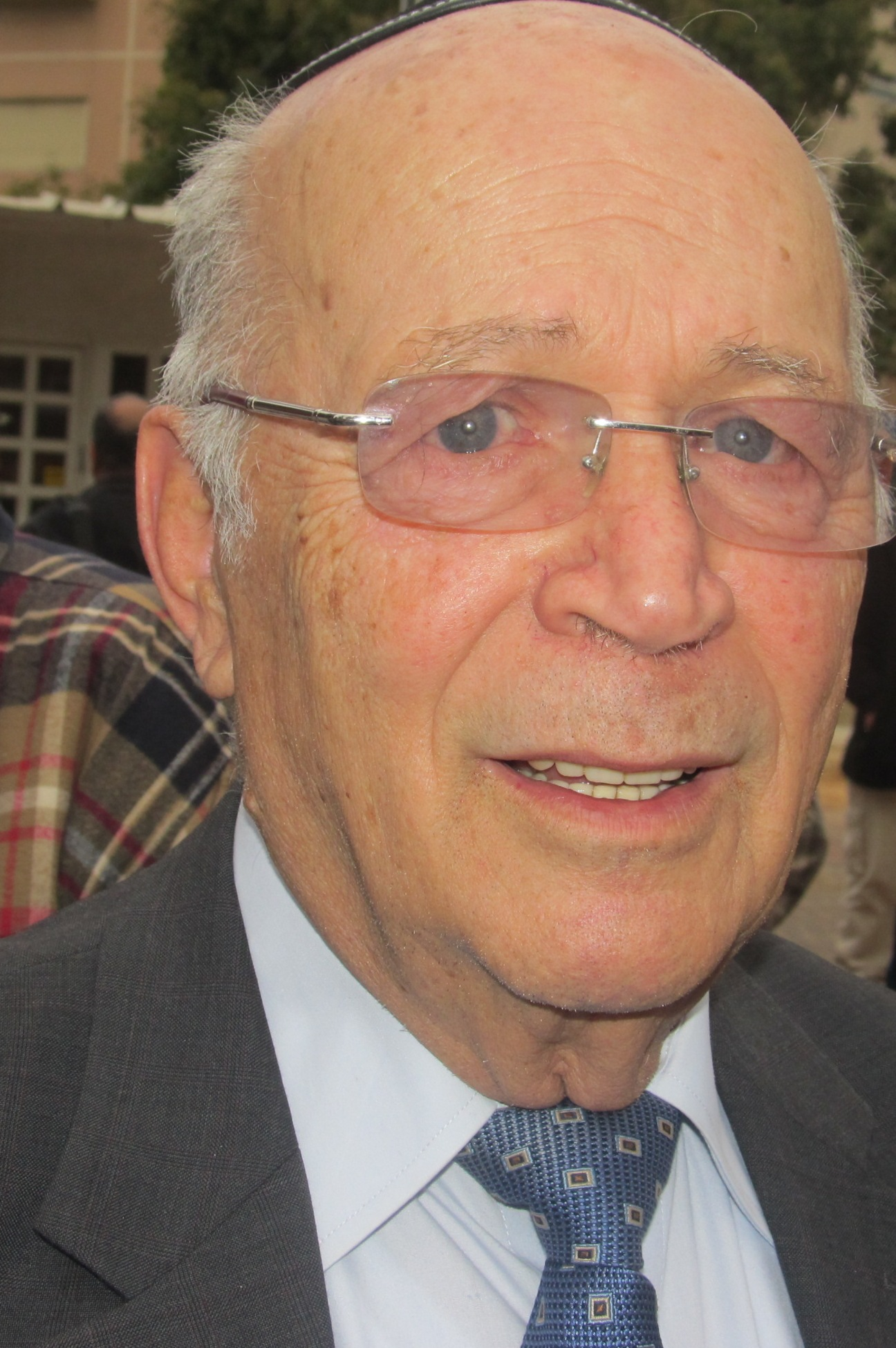

Ministerial roles
- 1996–1999: Minister of Health

Faction represented in the Knesset
- 1984–2002: Likud

Personal details
- Born: 8 August 1931 Jerusalem, Mandatory Palestine
- Died: 30 December 2020 (aged 89) Jerusalem, Israel

Yehoshua Matza (Hebrew: יהושע מצא; 8 August 1931 – 30 December 2020) was an Israeli political figure and president and CEO of State of Israel Bonds, a global enterprise that generates more than $1 billion in annual sales. Israel utilizes the funds for economic development projects.

Matza was recommended for the post in 2002 by then-Prime Minister Ariel Sharon and then-Finance Minister Silvan Shalom. Matza served 18 years in the Knesset, Israel’s parliament, as a member of the Likud party. He was a cabinet minister in the government of Benjamin Netanyahu, holding the portfolio of minister of health. Matza also served 20 years on the Jerusalem City Council, 10 of which were in the capacity of deputy mayor. His final years in public service were as the president of the Menachem Begin Heritage Foundation in Jerusalem.

== Biography ==
The Matza family arrived in Palestine from Ioannina in Greece, and settled in the Jewish Quarter in Jerusalem's walled Old City. Matza was born in the city during the British Mandate era. Influenced by his family's attitude, Matza joined the Jewish underground group Lehi at age 14. Of his three brothers, two were also active in the Jewish underground; one in the Haganah and the other in the Irgun.

His Lehi activities included posting anti-British flyers during the night, participating in paramilitary activities, and helping to hide weapons, sometimes in synagogues behind the arks where Torah scrolls were kept. During the 1948 Arab-Israeli War, Jerusalem was the scene of intense fighting, and Matza participated in an operation that enabled Lehi fighters to blast their way into the Old City. The operation entailed planting a bomb outside the New Gate of the Old City walls. However, the plan was aborted when the bomb failed to detonate.

In 1949, Matza resumed his schooling. After graduating high school, he was drafted into the Israel Defense Forces. He attained the rank of captain in the artillery corps. At university, he studied law and accounting. He began his private sector career with a Jerusalem accounting firm.

He was married and had four children.

== Political career ==
Matza first entered politics by joining Menachem Begin's right-wing Herut party. As a member of Herut's Jerusalem branch, Matza ran in Jerusalem's 1965 municipal elections and was voted onto the City Council. The elections also brought Teddy Kollek to power as mayor of Jerusalem. In 1969 Matza was elected deputy mayor; among his responsibilities was the beautification of Jerusalem, including the establishment of gardens and parks throughout the city. In 1978, by which time Herut had merged into Likud, Jerusalem held municipal elections based on voting for a candidate as opposed to the traditional method of voting for a party slate. Matza ran for city mayor, but lost to the incumbent, Teddy Kollek.

Prior to the 1984 Knesset elections Matza was placed on Likud's list. When the party won 41 seats, Matza took his place in the Knesset. He sat on the Knesset Finance Committee until 1988, when he retained his seat in elections that year. Re-elected in 1992 and 1996, he was appointed Minister of Health under Netanyahu in November 1996, and also sat on the Foreign Affairs and Defense Committee. When his efforts to increase the Health Ministry budget failed, Matza abstained from a key Knesset vote on the national budget. According to Israeli law, the budget must pass three Knesset readings by a specified date, otherwise the government will fall. In protest to what he viewed as insufficient allocations to the Health Ministry, Matza refused to participate in the vote. Following Matza's protest, Netanyahu agreed to increase government health allocations.

Although Matza retained his seat in the 1999 elections, Likud were defeated by Ehud Barak's One Israel alliance. Barak's involvement in discussions with Palestinian Authority leader Yasser Arafat over the division of Jerusalem led to Matza (then chairman of the Internal Affairs and Environment Committee) submitting a bill to amend the Jerusalem Law. The bill, which passed with the approval of 84 out of 120 Knesset members, stipulated that no decisions changing the status of Jerusalem could be made without majority consent.

== Israel Bonds ==
Although Likud regained power following the special election for Prime Minister in 2001 (which was won by Ariel Sharon), Matza was offered a role as deputy minister. However, he chose to remain as a Knesset member. Soon thereafter, however, Matza was elected as president and CEO of the Israel Bonds organization by its board of directors. Matza resigned from the Knesset (he was replaced by Eli Cohen) and moved to New York City in March 2002.
