= Glocal Forum =

- Formation: 2001; 25 years ago
- Founder: Uri Savir, Jan Stenbeck
- Founded at: Zurich, Switzerland
- Headquarters: Rome, Italy

The Glocal Forum is an international organization in the field of city-to-city cooperation; encouraging peace building and international development in the non-governmental sector. It emphasizes the central role of cities in international relations and subscribes to a glocalization vision.

== Purpose ==
The Glocal Forum was created in 2001 to emphasize the role of local authorities in the world governance system. 25 cities attended the first meeting in Rome in 2002. The Glocal Forum focuses on empowering local communities by linking them to one another and to global resources, in order to achieve social improvement, democratic growth, peace and a balance between global opportunities and local realities.

In 2007, the Global Forum had over 100 member cities, including all cities that had more than 500,000 residents. The Global Forum is based in Rome.

2007 participants in the Global Forum include Addis Ababa, Ethiopia; Agadir, Morocco; Athens, Greece; Baghdad, Iraq; Bishkek, Kyrgyzstan; Brussels, Belgium; Dushanbe, Tajikistan; Dubai, United Arab Emirates; Florence, Italy; Freetown, Sierra Leone; Kabul, Afghanistan; Karachi, Pakistan; Khartoum, Sudan; Kigali, Rwanda; Chișinău, Moldova; Managua, Nicaragua; Marseille, France; Moscow, Russia; Nablus, Palestine; Pristina, Kosovo; Rishon LeZion and Rosh HaAyin, Israel; Sanaa, Yemen; São Paulo, Brazil; Sofia, Bulgaria; Vienna; and Akron, Boston, Philadelphia, Washington, D.C., United States. According to Al Bawaba, "The Glocal network is made up of cities from Europe (50%), the United States (14%), Africa and the Middle East (22%), Asia (8%) and Latin America (6%)."
