= Uri Savir =

Israeli diplomat and politician (1953–2022)

- אורי סביר
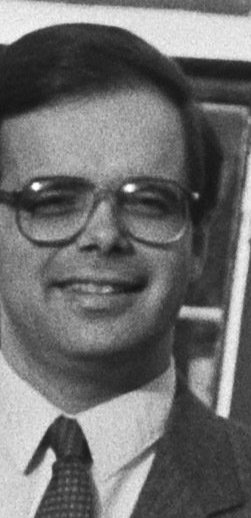

Faction represented in the Knesset
- 1999–2001: Centre Party
- 2001: New Way

Personal details
- Born: 7 January 1953 Jerusalem, Israel
- Died: 14 May 2022 (aged 69) Tel Aviv

Uri Savir (Hebrew: אורי סביר; 7 January 1953 – 14 May 2022) was an Israeli diplomat and politician. He was Israel's chief negotiator for the Oslo Accords and served as a Member of Knesset (MK) from 1999 to 2001.

== Early life ==
Savir was born in Jerusalem on 7 January 1953. His father, Leo, co-founded the Israeli Foreign Service. Savir studied at the Hebrew University of Jerusalem, graduating with a Bachelor of Arts in international relations.

== Career ==
Savir first worked at the Ministry of Foreign Affairs as an information officer at the Israeli embassy in Canada, before acting as a press officer at the consulate in New York City. He became the communications advisor of Shimon Peres in 1984, as well as one of his senior advisers. In that capacity, Savir participated in Peres' ground-breaking visit to Morocco in July 1986. Savir was subsequently appointed consul-general in New York in 1988, serving in that role for four years.

Savir was named director-general of the Foreign Ministry in May 1993 by Peres, who was foreign minister in the second Rabin cabinet. He remained in that position until June 1996. During his tenure, he was the chief negotiator for the Oslo Accords. His experience became the basis for his book The Process: 1,100 Days that Changed the Middle East, published in 1998. He was also a member of the Israeli delegation for negotiations with Jordan that resulted in the Israel–Jordan peace treaty in 1994, as well as head of the delegation for talks with Syria from 1995 to 1996.

In the 1999 elections, Savir was elected to the Knesset on the Centre Party list. He and two other MKs left the Centre Party on 6 March 2001 to form the New Way faction. Three weeks later on 28 March, he resigned from the Knesset, and was replaced by David Magen, who represented the Centre Party. During Savir's time in the Knesset he served on a number of committees, including the Foreign Affairs and Defense Committee.

Savir established the Glocal Forum, a non-profit organization involved in international relations. He also co-founded the Peres Center for Peace in 1996 and served as its director-general until 1999. He later established the Facebook group titled "YaLa-Young Leaders", a peace movement for Middle Eastern and North African youths to foster dialogue and change with Israeli peers. It had more than 800,000 followers at the time of his death.

== Personal life ==
Savir was married to Aliza until his death. Together, they had one daughter, Maya Savir.

Savir died on 14 May 2022, at the age of 69. The cause of death was not disclosed.
