= New Way (Israel) =

New Way דרך חדשה
- Leader: Dalia Rabin-Pelossof
- Founded: 6 March 2001
- Dissolved: 7 May 2001
- Split from: Centre Party
- Merged into: One Israel
- Most MKs: 3 (2001)
- Fewest MKs: 1 (2001)

The New Way (Hebrew: דרך חדשה, Derekh Hadasha) was a short-lived political faction in Israel in 2001.

== Background ==
The faction was formed on 6 March 2001 when three MKs, Amnon Lipkin-Shahak, Dalia Rabin-Pelossof and Uri Savir, broke away from the Centre Party.

Two days after the party's formation Lipkin-Shahak and Savir resigned from the Knesset, and were replaced by new Centre Party MKs David Magen and Nehama Ronen. With Rabin-Pelossof as its only member, New Way carried on as a single-member group for a short time, before she joined the Labor Party faction of Ehud Barak's One Israel on 7 May 2001 and the group was dissolved.
