= Ofer Hugi =

Israeli politician

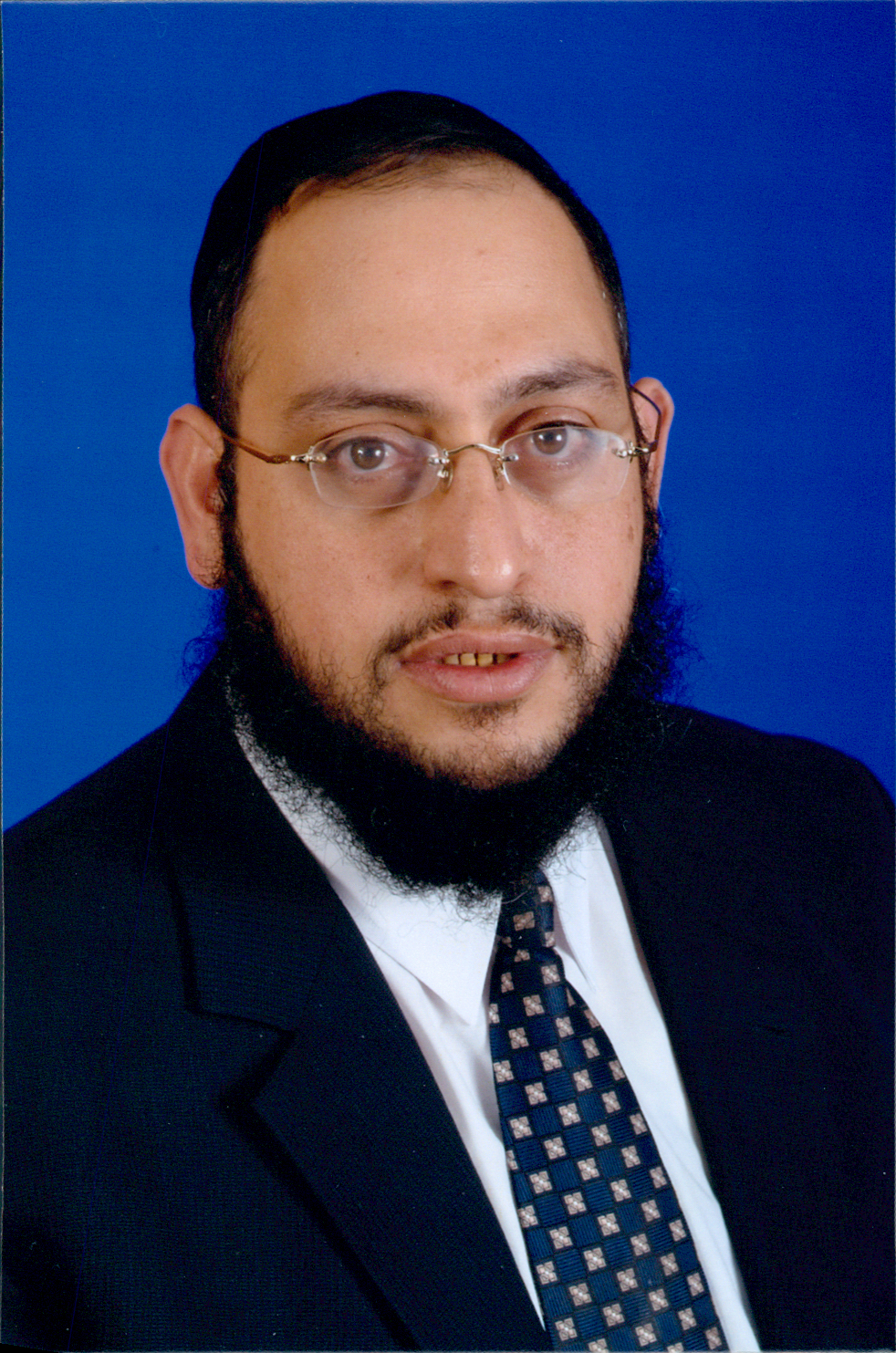
- Hugi during his time in the Knesset

Faction represented in the Knesset
- 1999–2003: Shas
- 2006: Shas

Personal details
- Born: 17 April 1964 (age 62)

Ofer Hugi (Hebrew: עופר חוגי; born 17 April 1964) is an Israeli former politician who served as a Knesset member for Shas from 1999 to 2003, and again for just under a month in 2006. In 2007, he was sent to prison for various charges related to forgery and fraud.

== Background ==
After finishing school, Hugi was conscripted into the IDF, where he attained the rank of Staff Sergeant. After completing his service, he studied for a B.A. in Rabbinical Ordination and went on to work as an administrator.

== Political career ==
Hugi joined Shas, a Mizrahi/Sephardi ultra-Orthodox party. He was elected to the Knesset in the 1999 elections when the party won an unprecedented 17 seats, making it the third-largest party after One Israel (the Labour Party) and Likud. However, Hugi lost his seat in the 2003 elections when the party was reduced to 11 seats (he was 12th on the list), possibly as a result of the party's growing reputation for corruption, several of its members having been convicted of various fraudulent offences.

He did briefly enter the Knesset at the end of April 2006 after Shas MK Yair Peretz had resigned from the Knesset after being convicted of fraud (he had fraudulently obtained an academic degree), but the Knesset was dissolved on 17 April, and Hugi did not win a seat in the 2006 elections.

== Conviction ==
After replacing an MK who had been convicted of fraud, in December 2006, Hugi was found guilty of aggravated forgery, using forged documents (by recording a fictitious salary for his wife, he avoided income tax), receiving items through fraudulent means, false registration of a corporation, and attempting to receive items through fraudulent means (including Education Ministry funding for student transportation). This was in relation to a technical college which he founded in the late 1990s, and had received hundreds of thousand of shekels for, though it later became apparent that the lists of students and teachers he had provided were fictitious.

In February 2007, Hugi was sentenced to two years in prison, and ordered to pay a fine of 12,000 shekels.

== See also ==
- List of Israeli public officials convicted of crimes or misdemeanors
