= Dalia Rabin-Pelossof =

Israeli politician (born 1950)

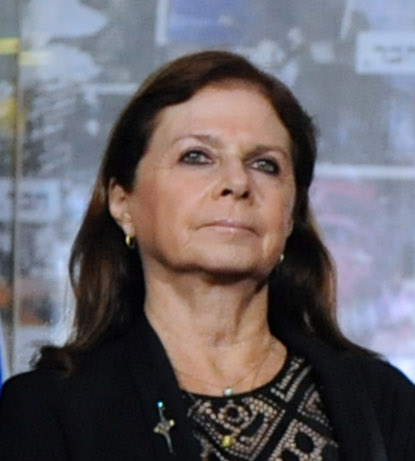
- Rabin-Pelossof in 2013

Faction represented in the Knesset
- 1999–2001: Center Party
- 2001: New Way
- 2001: One Israel
- 2001–2003: Labor Party

Personal details
- Born: 19 March 1950 (age 76) Israel

Dalia Rabin-Pelossof (Hebrew: דליה רבין-פילוסוף; born 19 March 1950) is an Israeli former politician. The daughter of former Prime Minister and Minister of Defense Yitzhak Rabin, she served as a member of the Knesset for the Center Party, New Way and the Labor Party between 1999 and 2003.

== Biography ==
Born in 1950, Rabin-Pelossof attended Tichon Hadash high school in Tel Aviv. She gained an LLB and worked as an attorney.

For the 1999 elections she was placed sixth on the Center Party list, and entered the Knesset as the party won six seats. She was appointed chairwoman of the Ethics Committee.

On 6 March 2001 she and two other Center Party MKs broke away to establish a new faction, New Way. The day after, she was appointed Deputy Minister of Defense in Ariel Sharon's new government.

On 26 March the other two New Way members resigned from the Knesset and were replaced by Center Party MKs, leaving Rabin-Pelossof alone in the faction. On 7 May 2001 she joined One Israel, which later became Labor-Meimad. She resigned from her ministerial post on 1 August 2002. She lost her seat in the 2003 elections.

Rabin-Pelossof is married with two children. She is the chairperson of the Yitzhak Rabin Center.
