= Nehama Ronen =

Israeli politician

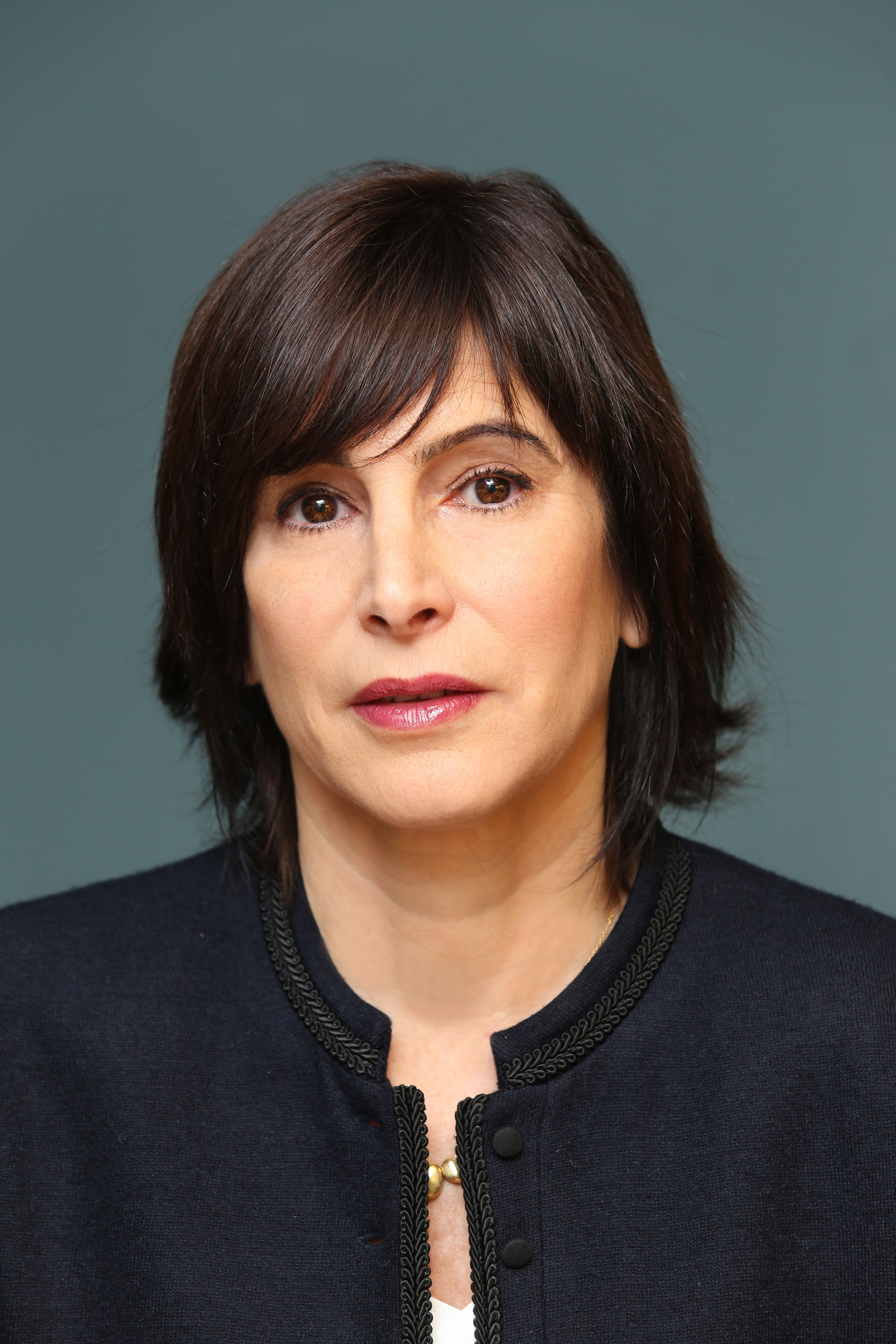
- Ronen in 2017

Faction represented in the Knesset
- 2001–2003: Centre Party

Personal details
- Born: 15 September 1961 (age 65) Israel

Nehama Ronen (Hebrew: נחמה רונן; born 15 September 1961) is an Israeli former politician who served as a member of the Knesset for the Centre Party between 2001 and 2003.

== Biography ==
Ronen studied education and history at Tel Aviv University, gaining a B.Ed. She also studied towards an MA in public administration at the University of Haifa and worked as an administrator. In June 1996 she was appointed Director General of the Ministry of Environmental Protection, a post she held until June 1999.

For the May 1999 Knesset elections she was placed seventh on the Centre Party list, but missed out on a seat when they won only six mandates. However, she entered the Knesset on 8 March 2001 as a replacement for Amnon Lipkin-Shahak. Prior to the 2003 elections she joined Likud, but was only placed 54th on the party's list, resulting in her losing her seat.

After leaving politics, she returned to her position as chairwoman at Maman Cargo Terminals and Handling in 2004, having previously held the post between 1999 and 2001. She also became chairwoman of ELA recycling and was a director at Bank Hapoalim.
