= Man's Rights in the Family Party =

Man's Rights in the Family Party מפלגת זכויות הגבר במשפחה - רע"ש
- Leader: Yaakov Schlusser
- Founder: Yaakov Schlusser
- Founded: 1986
- Ideology: Fathers' rights Men's rights

Election symbol
- ז (1996 and 1999) ט (2003) קז (2006) פק (2009)

The Man's Rights in the Family Party (Hebrew: מפלגת זכויות הגבר במשפחה - רע"ש, Miflega Zkhuyot HaGever BeMishpaha - Ra'ash) was a minor political party in Israel headed by Yaakov Schlusser.

== Background ==
In 1996, Schlusser published a book, Men's Rights in the Family?, which argued that family law in the State of Israel is biased against men. Issues such as divorce, alimony, false accusations of abuse, and child support are addressed.

Schlusser subsequently contested the 1996 Knesset elections as the head of the Man's Rights in the Family Party. The platform of the party called for the abolition of the clause granting automatic custody to the mother in cases of divorce for small children. It also called for basing child support on other factors besides the cost-of-living index. Other issues the party dealt with was more housing for young couples, lowering taxes, and a call for state pensions. It also called for the option of a secular civil marriage in addition to a religiously recognized marriage. It received 2,388 votes (0.1%), failing to win a seat.

In the 1999 Knesset elections, the party ran under the name "Justice for All", and received 1,257 votes (0.04%), the second lowest number of votes with a 1.5% electoral threshold.

In 2003, the party was accused by the Israel Women's Lobby of inciting violence against women and misrepresenting facts in their campaign broadcasts. However, according to an article in Haaretz, the chairman of the Central Elections Committee rejected the women's lobby petition to censor the campaign. In the subsequent Knesset elections, the party received 1,284 votes (0.04%). The 2006 elections saw the party run as "Justice for All" again, this time receiving 3,819 votes (0.12%).

Prior to the 2009 Knesset elections, Schlusser said in an interview with Yedioth Achronoth that one out of every two fathers loses the right to see their children as a result of messy divorces, adding, "children have a right to see their fathers", also claiming that "a child that sees a woman in control, in contradiction to nature, may turn homosexual". In the elections, the party received only 921 votes (0.03%).

In 2012, Schlusser was profiled in Makor Rishon about his personal experiences which led him to run for public office. In 2013, he advocated changing laws that stipulate stay-at-home men must pay National Insurance, while housewives are exempt. In an interview with Haaretz, he stated, "When it comes to the age of retirement, for example, women can retire at age 62, but I can't."
