= Yair Peretz =

Israeli politician

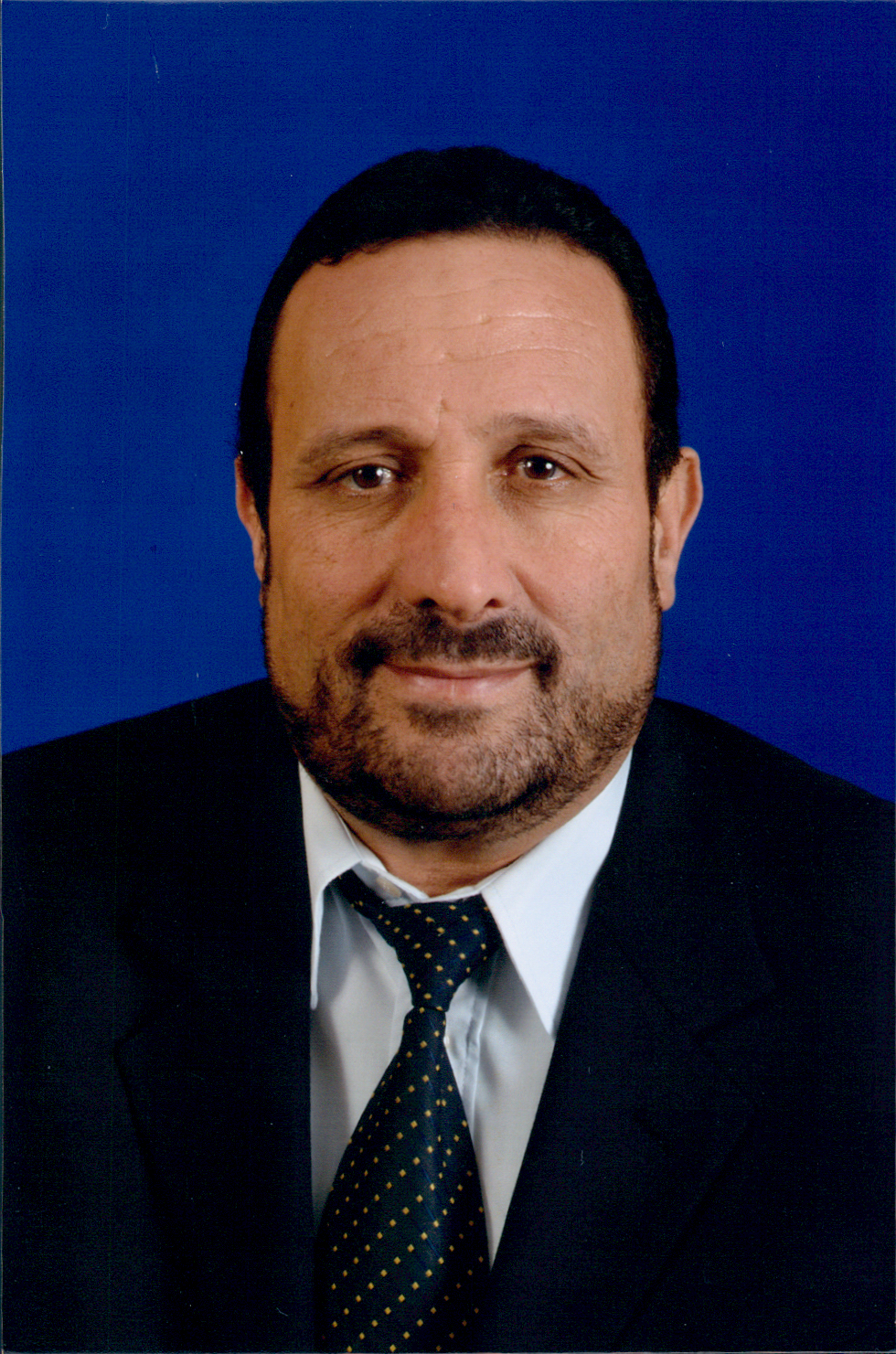

Faction represented in the Knesset
- 1999–2006: Shas

Personal details
- Born: 2 March 1954 (age 72) Morocco

Yair Peretz (Hebrew: יאיר פרץ; born 2 March 1954) is an Israeli former politician who served as a member of the Knesset for Shas from 1999 until being convicted of fraudulently obtaining an academic degree in March 2006.

== Biography ==
Born in Morocco in 1954, Peretz immigrated to Israel in 1961. After his national service in the IDF (in which he served in the Nahal and as a quartermaster), he earned a certificate in social work, and worked as a social worker. He served as a member of the Histadrut congress and the Bituah Leumi council and was also a member of the professional committee in the Ministry of Labour and Welfare.

In 1999 he was placed sixteenth on the Shas list for the Knesset elections to the Knesset, and was elected as the party won seventeen seats. During his first term as an MK, he chaired the committee on Foreign Workers and the Labour, Welfare, and Health committee, and was also the chairman of the Shas parliamentary group. Moved up to ninth place on the Shas list for the 2003 elections, he was re-elected and remained chair of the party's parliamentary group.

However, in December 2004 the Knesset House Committee revoked Peretz's parliamentary immunity so that he could be charged with breach of trust, fraud, and attempted conspiracy. The charges related to alleged attempts to obtain a bachelor's degree in psychology from Bar-Ilan University, which was uncovered by a police wiretap.

After being convicted of fraudulently obtaining an academic degree in March 2006, he resigned from the Knesset, and was replaced by Ofer Hugi (who himself was later imprisoned for various charges related to forgery and fraud).

== See also ==
- List of Israeli public officials convicted of crimes or misdemeanors
