= Tzali Reshef =

Israeli politician

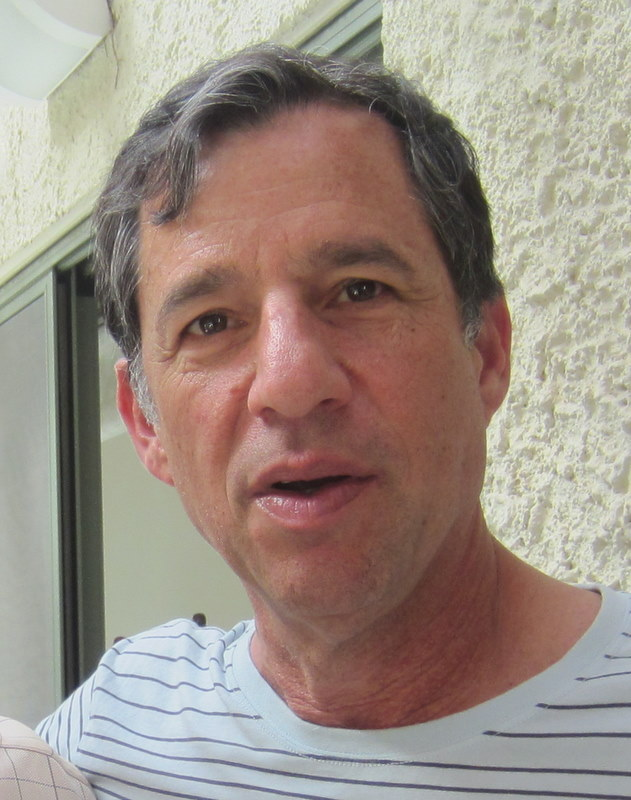
- Reshef in 2012

Faction represented in the Knesset
- 2002–2003: Labor Party

Personal details
- Born: 23 June 1953 (age 72) Israel

Betzalel "Tzali" Reshef (Hebrew: בצלאל "צלי" רשף; born 23 June 1953) is a former Israeli politician who served as a member of the Knesset for the Labor Party between August 2002 and February 2003.

== Biography ==
Reshef obtained a bachelor's degree in law and economics from the Hebrew University of Jerusalem and a master's degree in law from Harvard University. He then began working as an attorney.

One of the founders of Peace Now, he authored a book on the organisation in 1996 entitled Peace Now: From the Officers' Letter to the Peace Now.

Prior to the 1999 elections he was placed 35th on the One Israel list (an alliance of Labor, Meimad and Gesher), but failed to become a Knesset member as the alliance won only 26 seats. Although he entered the Knesset on 21 August 2002 as a replacement for Ra'anan Cohen, he did not contest the 2003 elections and lost his seat.

He was placed ninth on the Meretz list for the 2009 elections, but the party won only three seats.

He was a co-host, along with Geulah Cohen, of a radio show on Reshet Bet.
