= Yitzhak Gagula =

Israeli politician

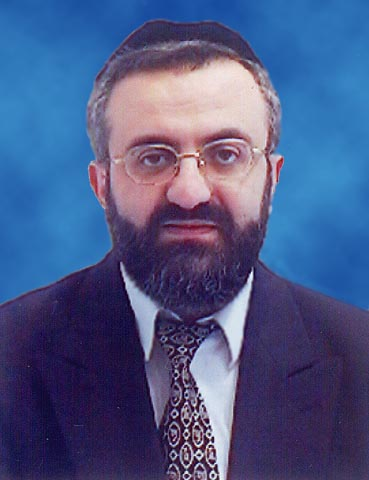
- Gagula during his time in the Knesset.

Faction represented in the Knesset
- 1999–2003: Shas

Personal details
- Born: 1 January 1964 (age 62) Georgian SSR, Soviet Union

Yitzhak Gagula (Hebrew: יצחק גאגולה; born 1 January 1964) is an Israeli former politician who served as a member of the Knesset for Shas between 1999 and 2003.

== Biography ==
Born Isaak Gagulashvili in the Georgian SSR in the Soviet Union, Gagula was educated at a yeshiva. He emigrated to Israel in 1972.

For the 1999 Knesset elections he was placed 18th on the Shas list. Although the party won only 17 seats, Gagula entered the Knesset at the start of the term as the party's top candidate, Aryeh Deri, resigned due to a corruption trial.

He lost his seat in the 2003 elections.
