= Rahamim Malul =

Israeli politician

- רחמים מלול
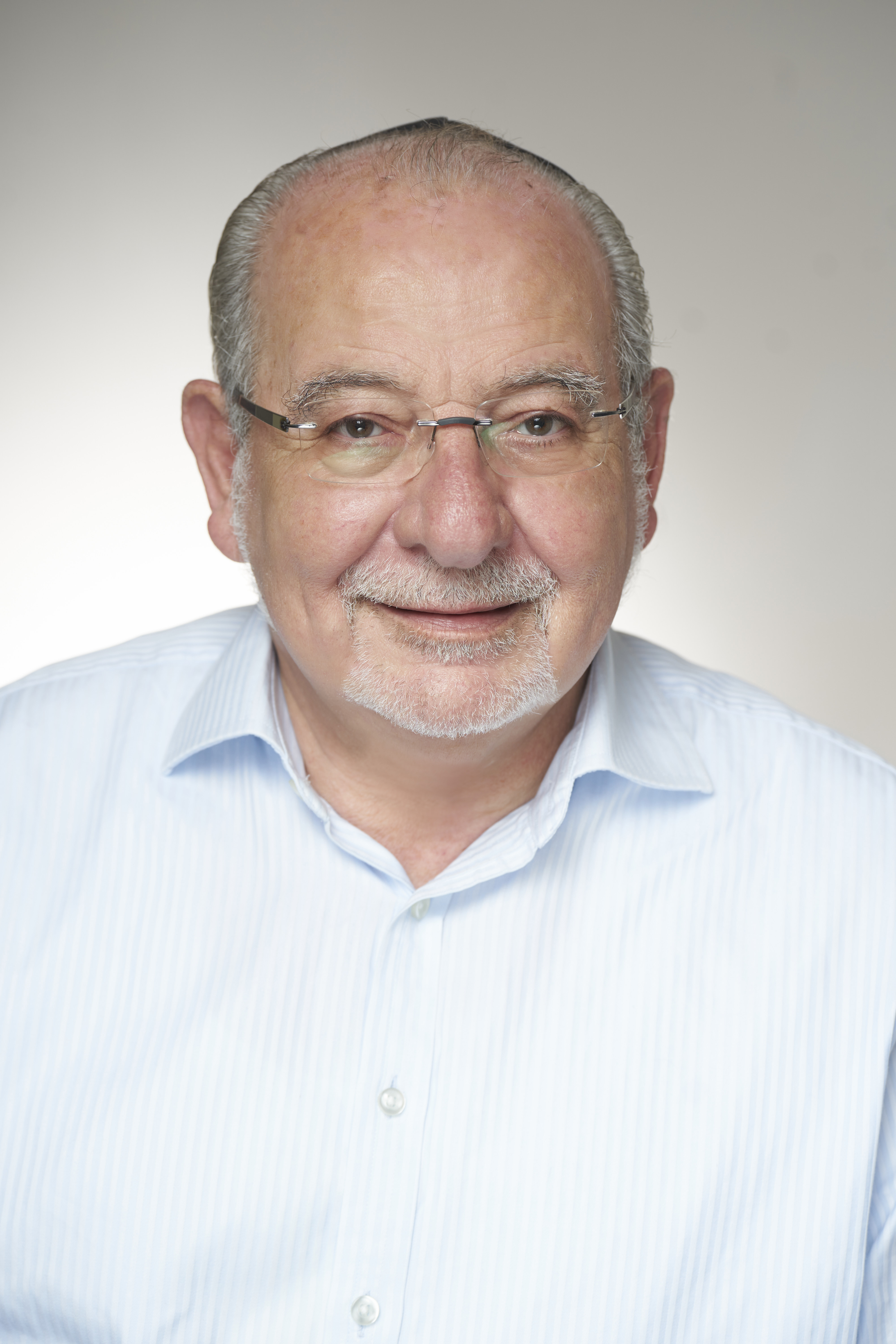
- Malul in 2020

Faction represented in the Knesset
- 1999–2003: Shas

Personal details
- Born: 29 April 1946 (age 78); Morocco

Rahamim Malul (Hebrew: רחמים מלול; born 29 April 1946) is an Israeli politician who served as a member of the Knesset for Shas between 1999 and 2003 and was mayor of Rehovot from 2009 to 2024.

== Biography ==
Born in Morocco, Malul made aliyah to Israel in 1960. He studied at a teachers' college, and worked as a teacher and administrator.

He was elected onto Rehovot city council, where he served three terms. In August 1996 he was appointed head of the local council of the Bedouin city of Kuseife by the Ministry of Internal Affairs.

In the 1999 elections Malul was placed 12th on the Shas list, and entered the Knesset when the party won 17 seats. He lost his seat in the 2003 elections

He became mayor of Rehovot in 2009 after the resignation of Shuki Forer, remaining in office until losing the mayoralty in the 2024 municipal elections.
