= Yosef Ba-Gad =

Israeli former Rosh Yeshiva and politician

- Ba-Gad in 2009

Faction represented in the Knesset
- 1992-1996: Moledet
- 1996: Independent

Personal details
- Born: 10 February 1932 (age 94) Jerusalem, Mandatory Palestine

Yosef Ba-Gad (Hebrew: יוסף בא-גד; born 10 February 1932) is an Israeli former Rosh Yeshiva and politician who served as a member of the Knesset between 1992 and 1996.

== Biography ==
Ba-Gad was born in the Jerusalem neighbourhood of Motza during the Mandate era. He attended Yeshivat Kfar HaRoeh and Yeshivat Hebron and gained an MA from Bar-Ilan University, before working as head of a yeshiva. In 1955 he established the Bnei Akiva-affiliated Nehalim yeshiva. He also served as director of the Center for Religious Education and was a member of the Council for Religious Education.

In 1992 he was elected to the Knesset on the Moledet list. However, on 12 March 1996 he left the party to sit as an independent. He established a new party named Moreshet Avot (Heritage of the Fathers), and planned to run in the 1996 elections, though the party pulled out and Ba-Gad lost his seat. He had also planned to run in the election for Prime Minister, but failed to gather the 50,000 signatures necessary.

Ba-Gad decided to run again in the 1999 elections, but was disqualified by the Central Elections Committee after it was discovered that at least one-third of the 61,000 signatures he submitted were suspected to be fraudulent. Moreshet Avot remained on the ballot for the Knesset elections, but won only 1,164 votes, the lowest of any party, after Ba-Gad called on his supporters to vote for the National Religious Party.

In 2005 he was indicted on charges of aggravated forgery, conspiracy to committing a crime, suborning perjury and attempted fraud, all relating to his 1999 election campaign, in which he allegedly offered businessman Meir Manor NIS 100,000 to fraudulently collect 30,000 signatures. He was eventually convicted as part of plea bargain in 2007 and sentenced to six months in prison.

== Family ==
Ba-Gad's granddaughter, Rinat Gutman, is a professional rapper and singer in Israel.
