= Nahum Langental =

Israeli politician

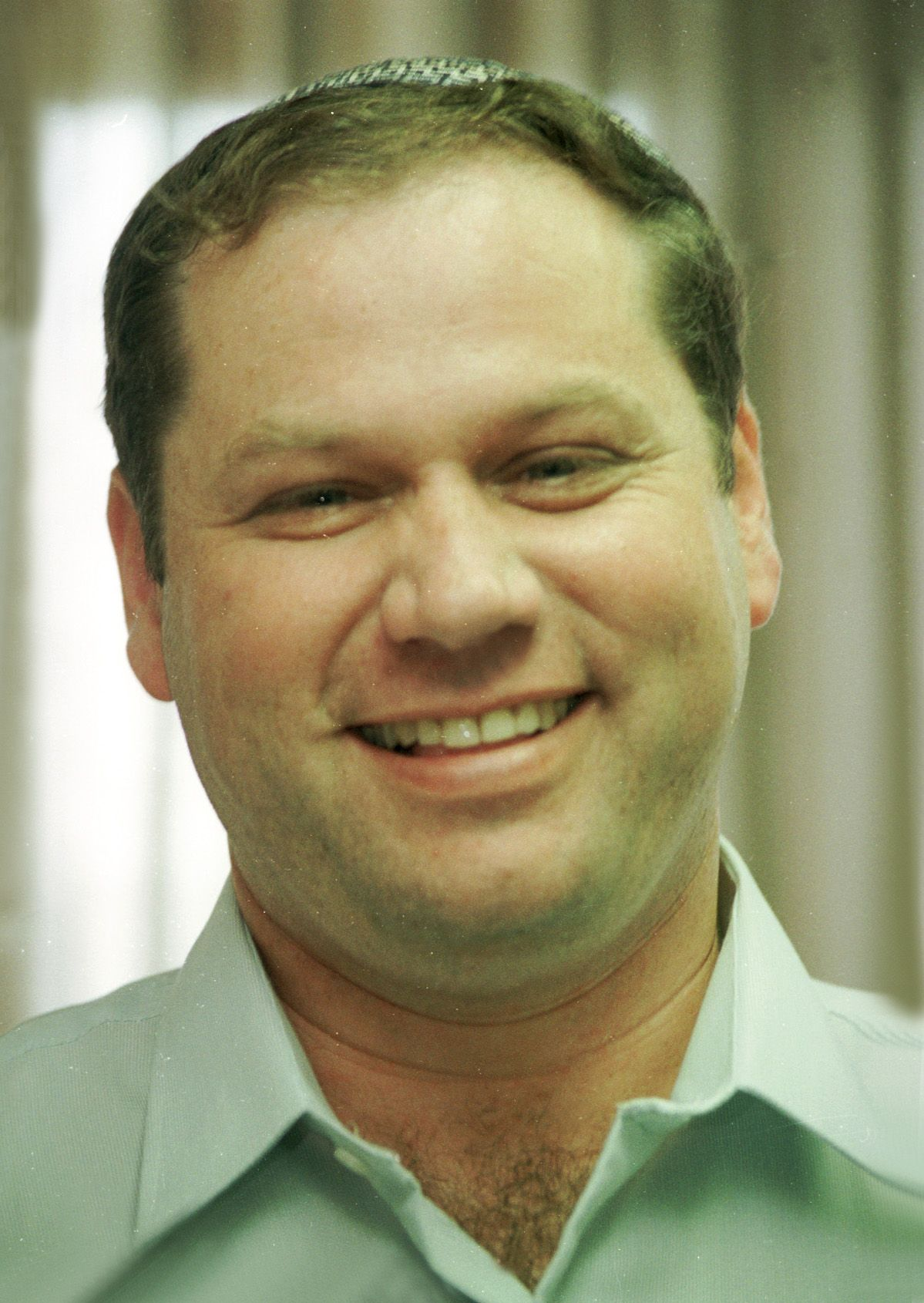
- Langental in 1996

Faction represented in the Knesset
- 1999–2003: National Religious Party

Personal details
- Born: 20 January 1960 (age 66) Israel

Nahum Langental (Hebrew: נחום לנגנטל; born 20 January 1960) is an Israeli former politician who served as a member of the Knesset for the National Religious Party between 1999 and 2003.

== Biography ==
Langental was born and raised in Bnei Brak. After serving in the Israel Defense Forces, he studied law at Bar-Ilan University, gaining an LLB. He also studied history and the history of Israel, gaining a BA. He worked as an attorney.

For the 1999 elections he was placed sixth on the National Religious Party list, but missed out on a seat when they won only five mandates. However, he entered the Knesset on 15 July 1999 as a replacement for Yitzhak Levy, who resigned upon being appointed Minister of Housing and Construction. During his first term, he was a member of several committees, and chaired the Subcommittee for the War on Traffic Accidents, the Parliamentary Inquiry Committee on Traffic Accidents. the Subcommittee for Industry, Trade, and Hi-Tech and theSubcommittee for the Advancement of Women in the Workplace and Economy.

He lost his seat in the 2003 elections.

His sister Yaffa was married to Likud MK Yehuda Glick.
