= Eli Cohen (politician, born 1949) =

Israeli politician

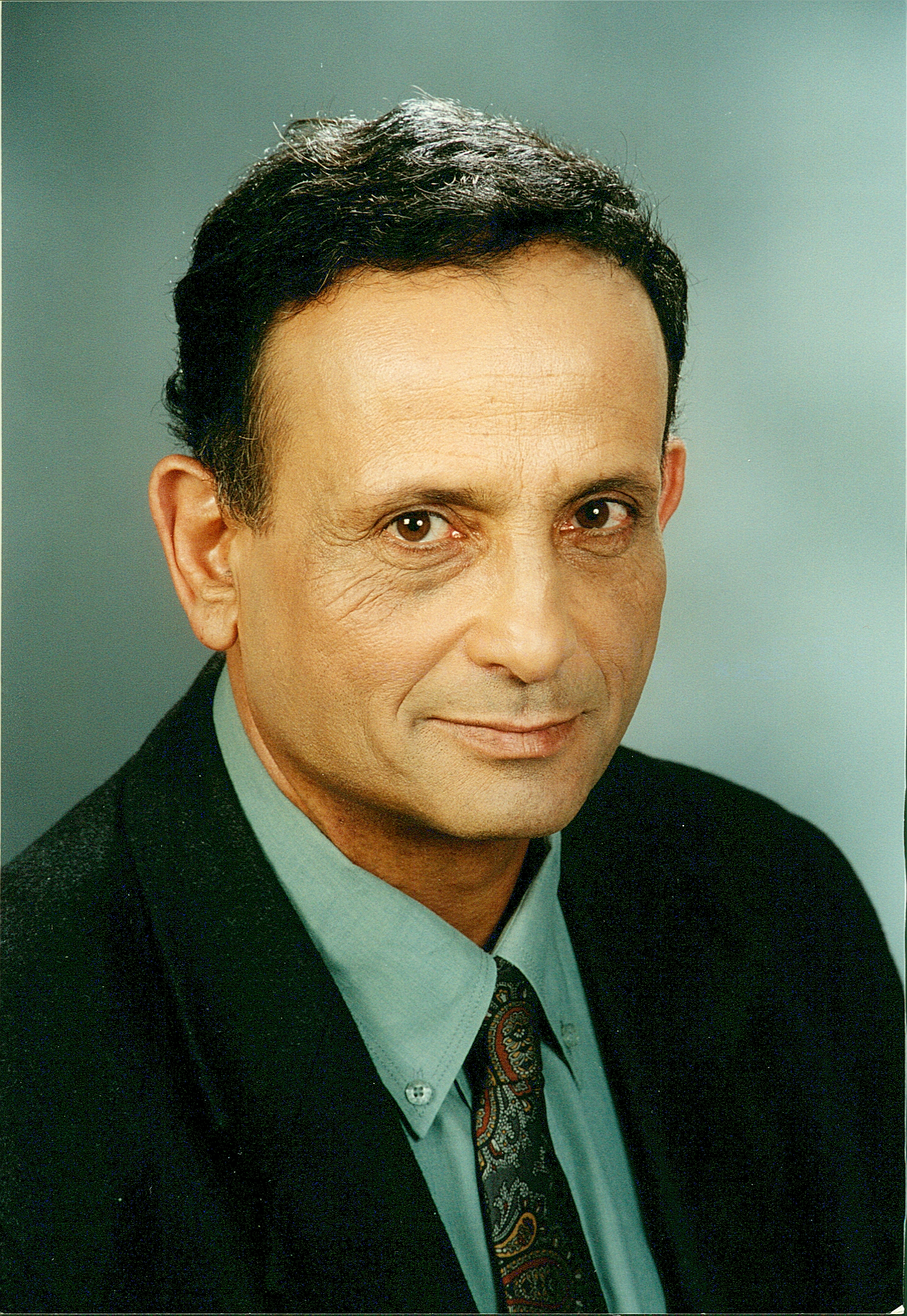
- Cohen in the early 2000s

Faction represented in the Knesset
- 2002–2003: Likud

Diplomatic roles
- 2004–2007: Ambassador to Japan

Personal details
- Born: 29 May 1949 (age 76) Jerusalem, Israel

Eli Cohen (Hebrew: אלי כהן; born 29 May 1949) is an Israeli politician who served as a member of the Knesset for Likud between 2002 and 2003. He was subsequently Israel's ambassador to Japan from 2004 until 2007.

== Biography ==
Cohen was born in Jerusalem to a family who immigrated to Israel from Tunisia. He studied mathematics and physics at the Hebrew University of Jerusalem, gaining a BA and his MBA degree from the University of West London. He served as a Betar emissary to North America and director of the Settlement Department of the World Zionist Organization.

== Political and diplomatic career ==
A former deputy head of the Ma'ale Adumim council, he was placed 23rd on the Likud list for the 1999 elections, but missed out on a seat as the party won only 19 seats. However, he entered the Knesset on 22 February 2002 as a replacement for Yehoshua Matza. He lost his seat in the 2003 elections.

Cohen served as ambassador to Japan from 2004 to 2007. He is the author of several books in Japanese about Israeli and Japanese culture and about Bushido lifestyle in contemporary Japan.

In 1995, Cohen was appointed head of the delegation and search team to the Himalayan Mountains in Bhutan and Tibet in a successful search for a friend’s lost son. In 2018, in recognition of this act and a lifetime of public service, he received both the Rising Sun Silver and Gold Award from the Emperor of Japan.

== Martial arts career ==
Cohen is a 5th degree black belt in karate. He served as president of the Israel Shotokan karate organization and coached martial arts at Wingate Institute.

== Business career ==
Cohen is president of EC Advanced Technologies Marketing, which he founded in 1999. He also serves as a consultant for Israeli and Japanese high-tech and real estate companies.

== Awards and recognition ==
- Order of the Rising Sun, 2nd Class, Gold and Silver Star (2018)
