= Pinhas Tzabari =

Israeli politician

- פנחס צברי

Faction represented in the Knesset
- 2002–2003: Shas

Personal details
- Born: 27 December 1956 (age 69) Israel

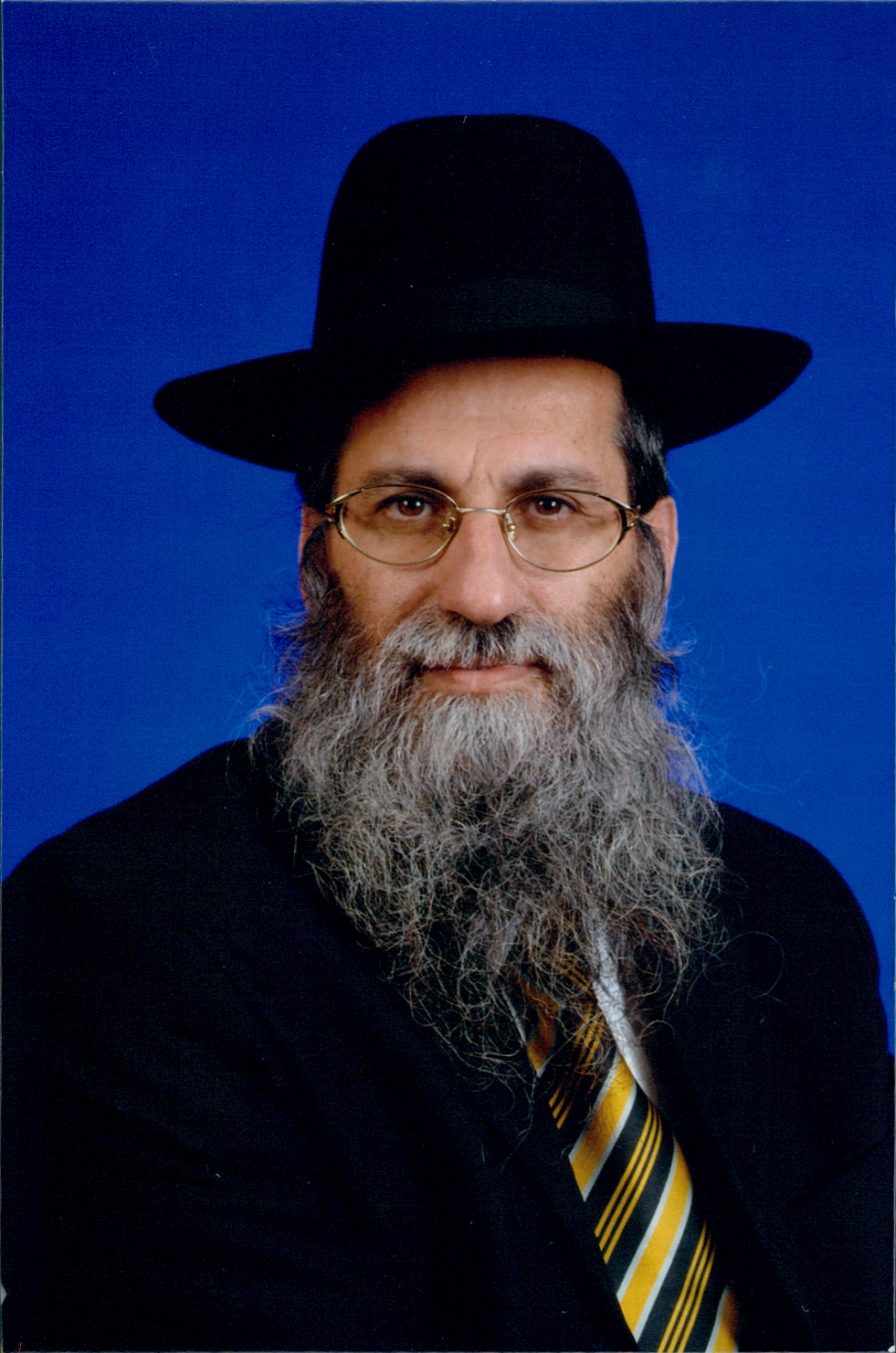
Pinhas Tzabari

Pinhas Tzabari (Hebrew: פנחס צברי; born 27 December 1956) is an Israeli politician who was a member of the Knesset for Shas for three months between November 2002 and February 2003.

== Biography ==
Born in Israel, Tzabari was an officer in the Israel Defense Forces. He has an MBA.

His public activity is done mainly through the municipal arena, where he serves as a council member on behalf of Shas at Bnei Brak's local council. During the term between 2003–2008, Tzabari also served as deputy mayor in charge of infrastructures and development.

For the 1999 elections Tzabari was placed 19th on the Shas list. Although he missed when the party won only 17 seats, he entered the Knesset on 14 November 2002 as a replacement for David Tal after the latter's resignation from the Knesset.

He was placed 13th on the list for the 2003 elections, but lost his seat when Shas retained only 11 of its 17 seats.
