= David Magen =

Israeli politician

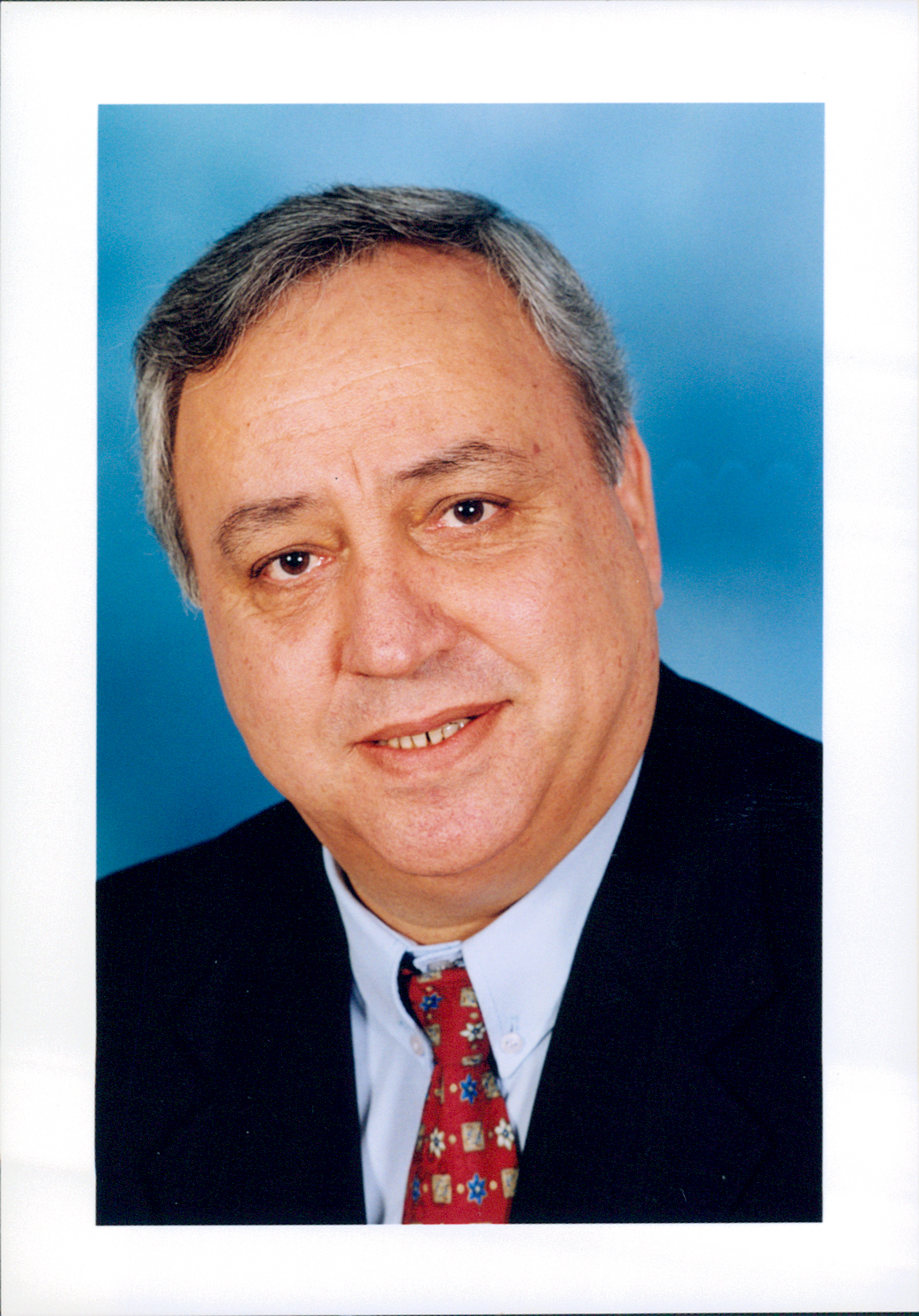
- Magen in 1993

Ministerial roles
- 1990: Minister without Portfolio
- 1990–1992: Minister of Economics & Planning

Faction represented in the Knesset
- 1981–1999: Likud
- 1999: Center Party
- 2001–2003: Center Party

Personal details
- Born: 4 September 1945 (age 81) Fes, Morocco

David Magen (Hebrew: דוד מגן; born 4 September 1945) is an Israeli former politician who served as a Minister of Economics and Planning, Minister without Portfolio, Mayor of Qiryat Gat, Chairman of the board of the Amidar company, and Chairman of the special committee for the establishment of the city Harish.

== Biography ==
Magen was born in Fes, Morocco, and immigrated to Israel in 1949. He grew up in Jerusalem and served in the IDF between 1963–1972, reaching the rank of Major. During his military service, he moved to Qiryat Gat, and after his discharge from the military, he was appointed as the city's municipal manager.

In the 1973 municipal elections, Magen led the Likud list for the Qiryat Gat City Council. His list increased its representation from one to five seats out of thirteen. Magen remained in the opposition and attempted to form an alternative coalition to oust the mayor from the Alignment. In April 1975, Magen joined the coalition with his faction and was appointed Deputy Mayor. However, in February 1976, the mayor dismissed him from the position. In July 1976, Magen managed to garner the support of the two religious representatives on the council and was elected mayor. In the personal elections of November 1978, Magen received 64.5% of the votes, and his list won six out of thirteen seats on the council. As mayor, Magen maintained relations with the Palestinians of the West Bank and the Gaza Strip. In September 1986, he announced his resignation to focus on national-level politics.

Magen was first elected to the 10th Knesset (1981) on the Likud list while serving as mayor of Qiryat Gat. In the 11th Knesset, he chaired the subcommittee for defense industries. In the 12th Knesset, he served as a Minister without Portfolio in the National Unity Government, and in the 24th Israeli Government, he was the Minister of Economy and Planning under Prime Minister Yitzhak Shamir, also chairing the Ministerial Committee on Coordination and Administration. He initiated, among other things, the establishment of the National Mapping Center. In the 13th Knesset, he chaired the State Control Committee.

Between 1982–1987, Magen was part of the more hawkish faction of Herut and was affiliated with Ariel Sharon’s camp. As part of this, he harshly criticized David Levy in October 1982. In 1985, he also criticized Yitzhak Shamir.

In 1989, he chaired the Likud’s headquarters for the municipal elections and won a great victory.

In 1995, Magen left the Likud along with David Levy to form Gesher Party, which eventually ran in a joint list with Likud in the Likud-Gesher-Tzomet bloc for the 14th Knesset. Early in the 14th Knesset, he served as Deputy Minister of Finance (until 20 May 1997). Later, when David Levy unexpectedly joined Ehud Barak in One Israel in 1999, Magen left for the "Israel in the Center" faction, which later became the Center Party. In the 15th Knesset elections, he was placed eighth on the list, but the party only won six seats, so he initially remained outside the Knesset. He joined after the resignation of Uri Savir. He chaired the Foreign Affairs and Defense Committee in the 15th Knesset and the parliamentary inquiry committee investigating the water crisis (the committee recommended urgently building desalination plants with a capacity of 650 million cubic meters). Following the committee's report published in 2002, seawater desalination plants were built, producing about 700 million cubic meters of water today.

Ahead of the elections for the 16th Knesset, Magen was the only MK remaining in the Center Party. The Shinui Party offered him to run on a joint list, but he was reluctant to join a purely secular list. The Center Party ran alone under his leadership with a "national-social" platform, as he described it, but did not pass the electoral threshold.

Among the laws he initiated are the Law on Associations, the Development Cities and Areas Law, and the Law on Regional Councils (Election of the Head of the Authority).

In 2003, he founded and led the Friends of the Firefighters Association, which donated over 100 fire trucks to the fire service, built about ten fire stations, and provided much equipment to firefighters. In this voluntary role, he promoted the legislation of the new law (2013) and the overall change in the firefighting service.

He served as the chairman of the Amidar government company from 2008–2011.

He participated in a research group led by the Spanish professor Andreu Lascorz on the Expulsion of the Jews from Spain from 2011–2013.

From June 2014 to May 2022, he served as the chairman of the special committee for the establishment of the city of Harish, which was granted municipal status at that time.

== Family ==
He is married (1968) to Rachel Pinto and is the father of Shirit, Hadas Smadar and Moshik.
