= Yitzhak Saban =

Israeli politician

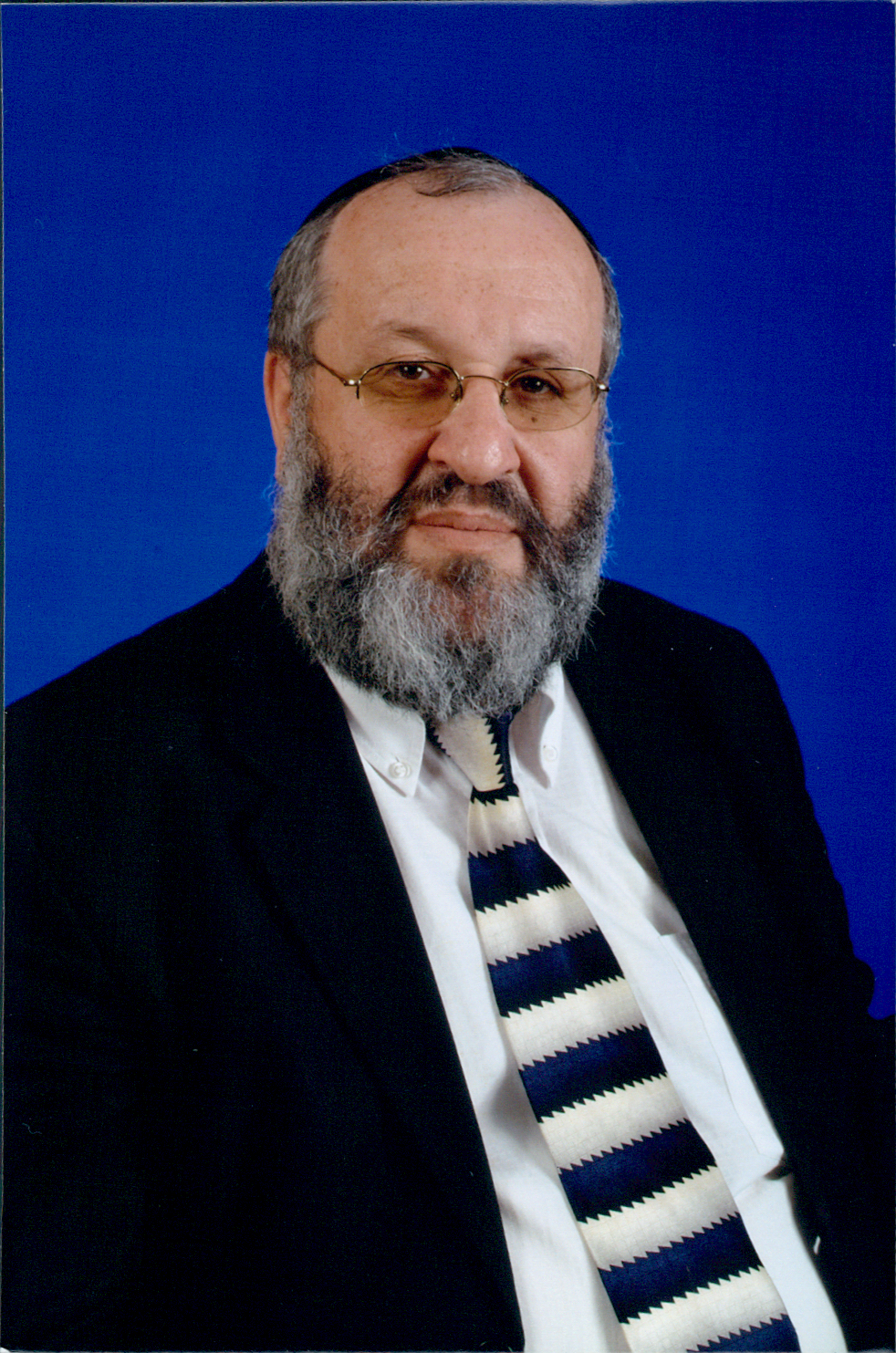
- Saban during his time in the Knesset

Faction represented in the Knesset
- 1999–2003: Shas

Personal details
- Born: 15 July 1952 (age 74) Israel

Yitzhak Saban (Hebrew: יצחק סבן; born 15 July 1952) is an Israeli former politician who served as a member of the Knesset for Shas between 1999 and 2003.

An accountant by trade, Saban was placed 14th on the Shas list for the 1999 elections, and entered the Knesset as the party won 17 seats.

He lost his seat in the 2003 elections.
