= Yitzhak Mordechai =

Israeli former general and politician

- יצחק מרדכי
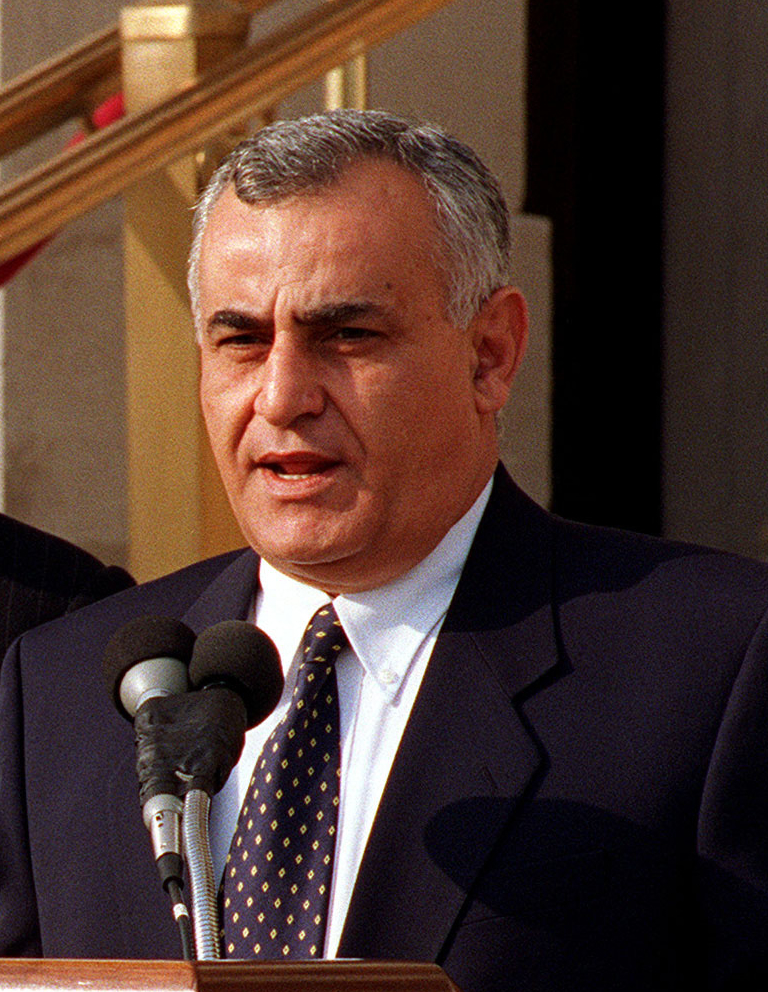
- Mordechai in 1997

Ministerial roles
- 1996–1999: Minister of Defense
- 1999–2000: Deputy Prime Minister
- 1999–2000: Minister of Transport

Faction represented in the Knesset
- 1996–1999: Likud
- 1999–2001: Center Party

Personal details
- Born: 22 November 1944 (age 81) Akre, Kurdistan Region, Iraq
- Awards: Medal of Courage

Military service
- Branch/service: Israel Defense Forces
- Years of service: 1962–1995
- Rank: Aluf
- Unit: 35th Paratroopers
- Battles/wars: Six-Day War; War of Attrition; Yom Kippur War; Battle of the Chinese Farm

Yitzhak "Itzik" Mordechai (Hebrew: יצחק מרדכי; born 22 November 1944) is an Israeli former general and politician. He served as a member of the Knesset between 1996 and 2001, and as Minister of Defense and Minister of Transport. He retired from political life after being indicted for sexual assaults during his military service and later periods.

== Biography ==
Mordechai was born in the town of Akre, in Iraq's Kurdistan Region, to a Sephardic Jewish family, and made aliyah to Israel in 1949. He holds a BA in history from Tel Aviv University and an MA in Political Science from the University of Haifa. He is a divorced father of three.

== Military career ==
In 1962 he enlisted to the Combat Engineering Corps of the Israel Defense Forces and later joined the Paratroopers Brigade. He remained in the military as an officer after finishing his compulsory military service. He fought in the Six-Day War, War of Attrition, and Yom Kippur War. During the Yom Kippur War, he participated in the Battle of the Chinese Farm. He was decorated with the Medal of Courage for his actions during the Yom Kippur War. In 1984, in what became known as the Kav 300 affair, Mordechai, then a Brigadier General, was framed for the killing of two Palestinian bus hijackers. Mordechai was tried, and acquitted when the truth became known. He was promoted to the rank of Major-General in 1986, and became known as the "General of the Three Commands", after serving as commander of all three territorial commands (North, Center and South). The First Intifada broke out in December 1987, when Mordechai was commander of the Southern Command. As head of the Northern Command he presided over Operation Accountability in 1993. Mordechai retired from active service in 1995 after 33 years of service, when new Chief of General Staff Amnon Lipkin-Shahak did not appoint him as his deputy.

Mordechai continued to hold the rank of Major General in the reserves following his retirement. After he was convicted of sexual harassment and assault, a military tribunal ruled that he would retain the rank of Major General in spite of his conviction. Military Advocate General Avichai Mandelblit appealed the decision, arguing that he should be demoted, but the Military Court of Appeals ruled that he could keep his rank.

== Political career ==
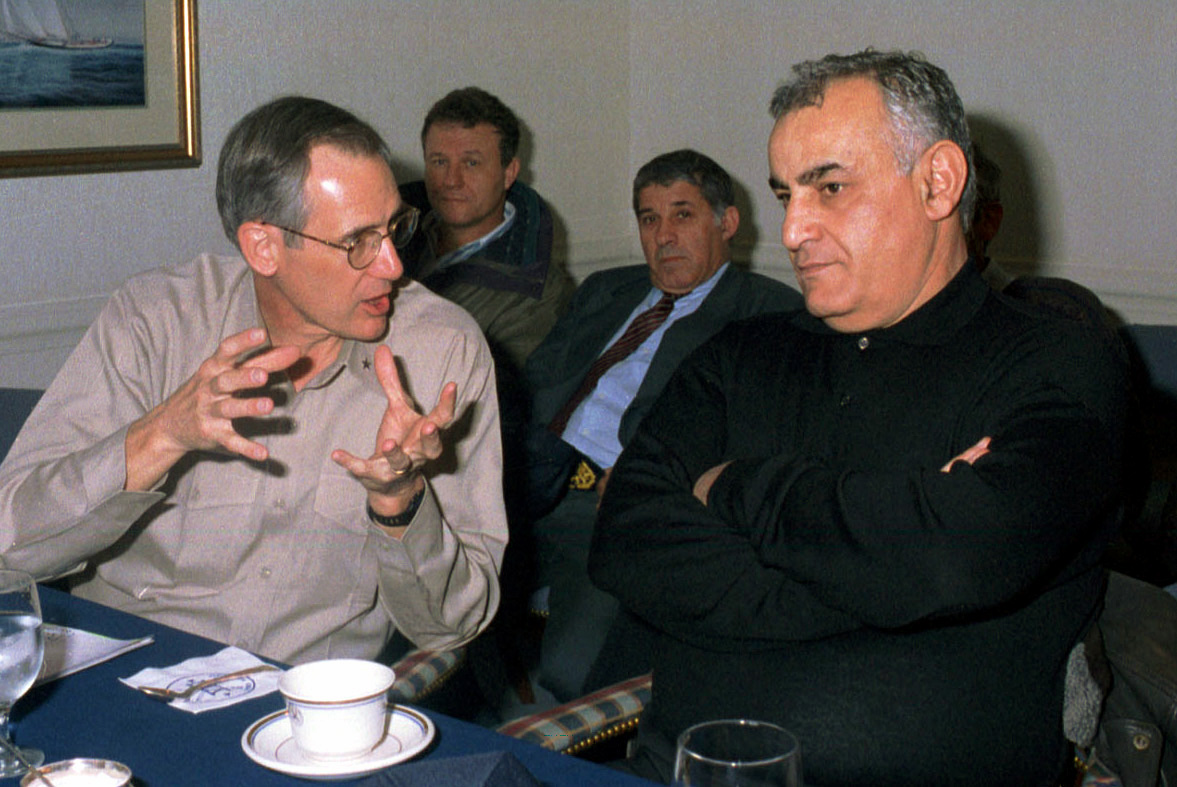
RMDL Gregory Johnson, Commander, Carrier Group 8, briefs Minister of Defense Yitzhak Mordechai during a tour of the nuclear powered aircraft carrier, 1997

In 1995 Mordechai joined Likud and was on the party's list for the elections the following year. After Binyamin Netanyahu won the election for Prime Minister, he appointed Mordechai as Defense Minister, where he became Lipkin-Shahak's boss.

In 1999, a public rift occurred between Mordechai and Netanyahu because of political rivalry and difference of opinion regarding the negotiations with Palestinians. Netanyahu dismissed Mordechai shortly before Mordechai would have reportedly resigned. On 23 February 1999 Mordechai left Likud along with several other members to establish the new Israel in the Centre party. However, despite strong initial poll results, the party fared badly in the 1999 elections, winning only six seats. Nevertheless, the party joined Ehud Barak's new Labor-led government and Mordechai became Minister of Transport.

Mordechai resigned from his ministerial position in 2000 after being indicted for sexual misconduct. He resigned from the Knesset in 2001.

== Sexual assault convictions ==
In March 2000, a secretary in Mordechai's office accused him of sexual harassment and assault. The 23-year-old employee, whose name was not released, alleged one instance where Mordechai reportedly pulled her onto a sofa in his office and put his hand under her blouse. Other women subsequently came forward with accusations of sexual misconduct. Police opened a probe into the sexual misconduct alleged by his secretary and two other women, one of whom accused him of assaulting her in 1996 when he was Defense Minister and another who alleged an incident in 1992 when he was head of the Northern Command. There were other allegations, but police did not probe them due to expiry of the statute of limitations. Mordechai's wife left him after the allegations surfaced and later divorced him. In April 2000, police recommended that he be charged with three counts of sexual assault. Mordechai was subsequently indicted and tried. In March 2001, he was convicted on two counts of sexual assault. The judges acquitted him of assaulting his secretary, whose allegations had prompted the investigation, over "inconsistencies" in her testimony, but stressed that this was not a repudiation of her claim. Mordechai received an 18-month suspended sentence.

== Awards and decorations ==

Six-Day War Ribbon	War of Attrition Ribbon	Yom Kippur War Ribbon	First Lebanon War Ribbon	Medal of Courage

== See also ==
- List of Israeli public officials convicted of crimes or misdemeanors
