= Weizman Shiry =

Israeli politician (born 1956)

- ויצמן שירי
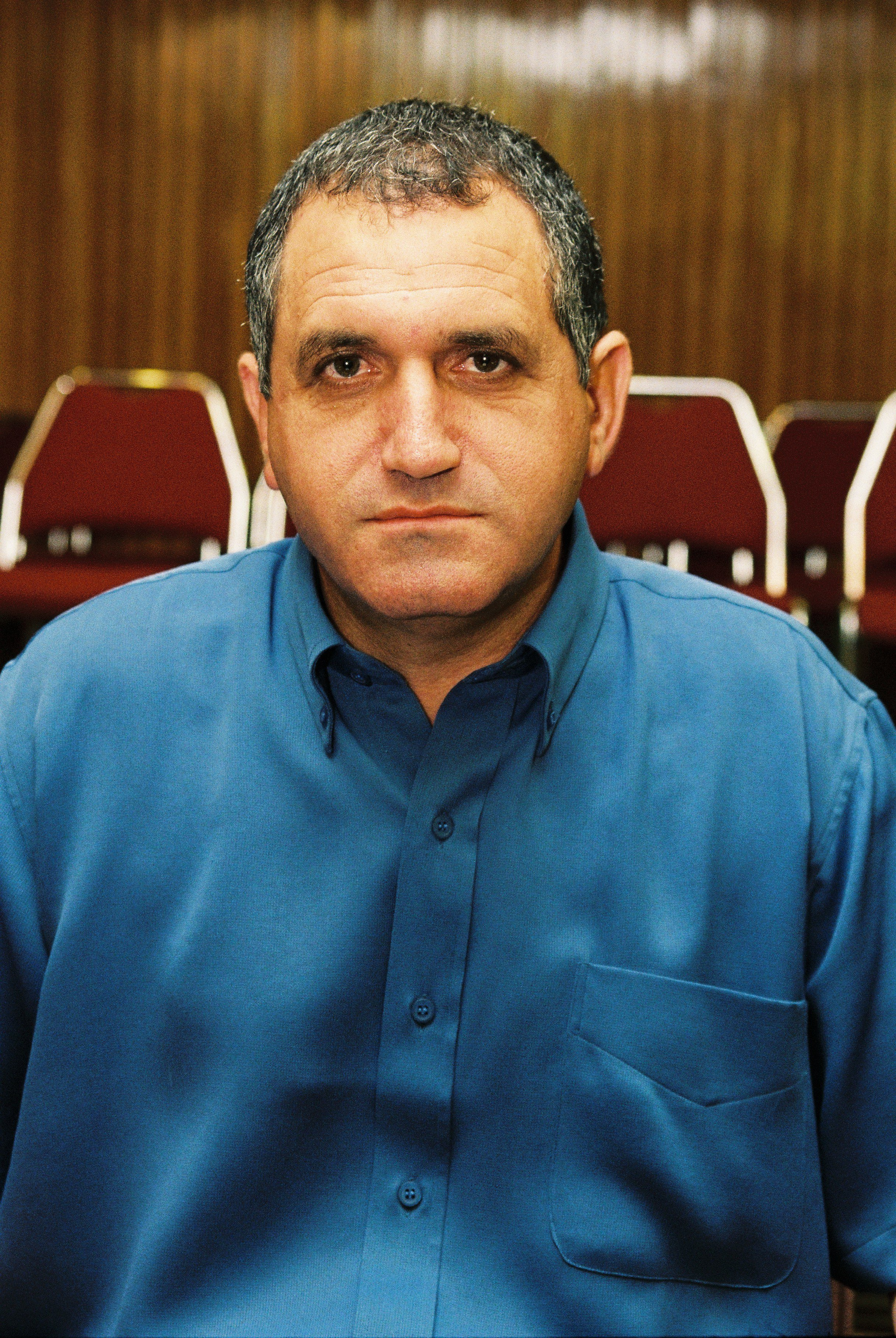

Faction represented in the Knesset
- 1999–2001: One Israel
- 2001–2003: Labor Party
- 2006: Labor Party

Personal details
- Born: 5 February 1956 (age 70) Beersheba, Israel

Weizman Shiry (Hebrew: ויצמן שירי; born 5 February 1956) is an Israeli politician and a former member of the Knesset for the Labor Party.

== Biography ==
Shiry was born in Beersheba in 1956 and was named after the first president of Israel Chaim Weizmann. He served in the Hermesh unit of the Israel Defense Forces. He then turned to business and headed several industrial companies, including a real estate company and a juice company which he purchased in 2007 for NIS 5 million.

He entered politics in 1984. His political activity included his membership in the internal institutions of the Labor Party, as well as being chairman of the party's Negev district. He was on the party's list for the 1996 legislative elections, but failed to win a seat.

In 1999, he was first elected to the Knesset and was chairman of the Joint Committee for the Defense Budget. In August 2002, he was appointed Deputy Minister of Defense, under Binyamin Ben-Eliezer, and maintained this position for three months, until the party's withdrawal from the coalition. He remained in the Knesset until the expiration of its term, in 2003. In January 2006, he re-entered the Knesset, replacing Shimon Peres, and served until the expiration of the Knesset's term in April 2006.

In April 2009, he was appointed temporary secretary-general of the Labor Party.
