= Amnon Lipkin-Shahak =

Israeli chief of staff, politician (1944–2012)

- אמנון ליפקין-שחק
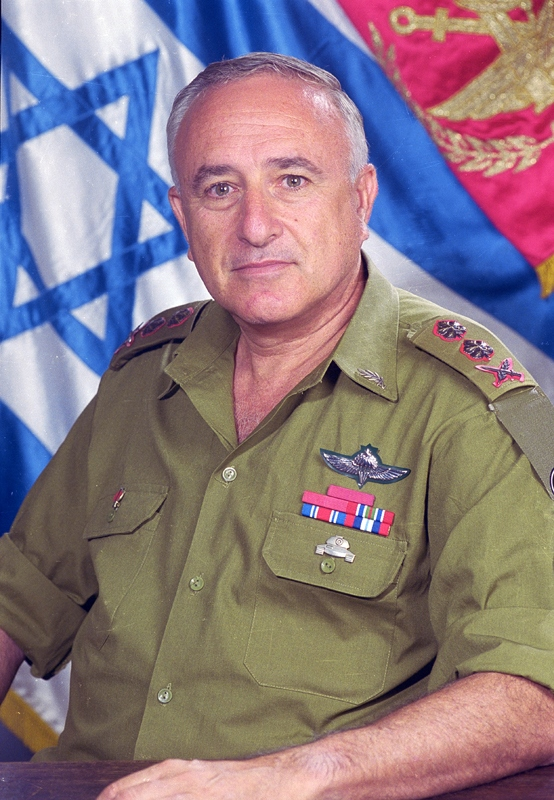

Minister of Transportation
- In office 5 August 1999 – 2001
- Prime Minister: Ehud Barak
- Preceded by: Ehud Barak
- Succeeded by: Rehavam Ze'evi

Minister of Tourism
- In office 11 October 2000 – 2001
- Prime Minister: Ehud Barak
- Preceded by: Yitzhak Mordechai
- Succeeded by: Efraim Sneh

Personal details
- Born: 18 March 1944 Tel Aviv, Mandatory Palestine
- Died: 19 December 2012 (aged 68) Hadassah Ein Kerem Hospital, Jerusalem
- Resting place: Kiryat Shaul Military Cemetery, Tel Aviv
- Party: Labor
- Other political affiliations: Center Party, New Way
- Spouse: Tali Lipkin-Shahak
- Children: 5
- Education: Tel Aviv University
- Profession: Military officer
- Awards: Medal of Courage (2)

Military service
- Allegiance: Israel
- Branch/service: Israel Defense Forces
- Years of service: 1962–1998
- Rank: Rav Aluf (Chief of Staff; highest rank)
- Unit: Paratroopers Brigade, Central Command
- Commands: Duchifat Unit (Sayeret), Nahal Airborne Battalion, Deputy Commander of the Paratroopers Brigade, Reservist Paratroopers Brigade, Paratroopers Brigade, A reservist armored division, Steel Formation, Central Command, Intelligence, Deputy Chief of General Staff, Chief of General Staff
- Battles/wars: Six-Day War, Operation Inferno, War of Attrition, 1973 Israeli raid in Lebanon, Yom Kippur War, First Lebanon War, First Intifada

Amnon Lipkin-Shahak (Hebrew: אמנון ליפקין-שחק; March 18, 1944 – December 19, 2012) was an Israeli military officer and politician. He served as Chief of Staff of the Israel Defense Forces, as a Member of the Knesset, and as Minister of Transportation and Minister of Tourism.

== Biography ==
Lipkin-Shahak was the great-grandson of Yitzhak Lipkin, an early pioneer to Palestine and businessman who financed the construction of the Ohel Shlomo and Shaarei Yerushalayim courtyard neighborhoods on Jaffa Road in Jerusalem at the end of the 19th century. Lipkin-Shahak, born in Tel Aviv, was the third son of Zvi and Sarah, and brother to Yaacov and Tamar. He was married to journalist Tali Lipkin-Shahak and had five children. He earned a B.A. in general history from Tel Aviv University.

In 1994, while serving as Deputy Chief of Staff, he said in an interview that four years earlier he was diagnosed with leukemia, but had since recovered. When it was discovered he had been serving as Director of Military Intelligence, and while battling it, then-Prime Minister Yitzhak Rabin allowed him to travel abroad for medical consultations.

On 19 December 2012, Amnon Lipkin-Shahak died in Hadassah Ein Kerem Hospital in Jerusalem, after a long battle with cancer.

== Military career ==
After finishing his studies at the military boarding school in Haifa in 1962, he enlisted in the Paratroopers Brigade, and served as a soldier and an infantry officer in the 890 battalion of the brigade. In 1965, he became a company commander in the newly established 202nd battalion of the brigade. As a company commander, he participated in reprisal operations preceding the Six-Day War. During the war, he served as acting deputy battalion commander. After the war, he took command of the Duchifat unit (Sayeret) of the brigade and participated in Operation Inferno, where he was awarded the Medal of Courage for "his leadership and courage under fire."

After graduating from the Command and General Staff School in 1971, he was appointed commander of the Nahal Airborne Battalion. Under his command, the battalion took part in many operations, mainly in the area of Lebanon. In April 1973, as a part of the Israeli raid in Lebanon, he assaulted PFLP headquarters in Beirut, and was decorated with a second Medal of Courage for "his leadership in action". During the Yom Kippur War, he served as deputy commander of the Paratroopers Brigade and fought in the Battle of the Chinese Farm, contained Egyptian forces at Ismailia, and defended the Sinai desert. After the war, he was assigned as the operations officer for Central Command, and was sent to the U.S. Marine's general staff command course in the United States.

In 1976, Lipkin-Shahak was promoted to Colonel and became head of the reservist Paratroopers Brigade. In 1977, he was appointed the head of the regular Paratroopers Brigade. During this period, the Brigade took part in several operations along all of Israel's borders, including extensive operations in Lebanon, including taking part in Operation Litani over the border. After finishing his term as commander of the brigade, he was appointed as a commander of a reservist armored division, and in 1982 became commander of the Steel Formation. While serving as the Division's commander, he served as the commander of the Beirut region after the First Lebanon War.

In 1983, Lipkin-Shahak was appointed the Head of Central Command. From 1986 to 1991 he served as Head of Intelligence, and during those years, among other things, prepared the IDF during the developments that led to the Gulf War. In 1991, he was appointed Deputy Chief of Staff, and during this role served as the commander of Operation Solomon, which brought 15,000 Ethiopian Jews to Israel.

On January 1, 1995, he became Chief of Staff of the IDF, succeeding Ehud Barak.

Lipkin-Shahak retired from the IDF in 1998. He was succeeded as Chief of Staff by Shaul Mofaz.

== Political career ==
After retiring from the army he expressed dovish opinions and severely criticized Prime Minister Benjamin Netanyahu. He called for the establishment of a centrist party that would include representatives of large parts of the public. “The Labor Party alone will not be able to achieve peace because of the leftist image that has attached to it, while a new centrist party that would include right-wing forces will succeed,” he said.

On 7 June 1999 he entered the 15th Knesset as a member of the Center Party. On 5 August, he was appointed Minister of Tourism. On 11 October 2001, he was appointed Transport Minister.

On 6 March 2001, the New Way faction, which included Lipkin-Shahak, split off from the Center Party. On 8 March, he resigned from the Knesset.

After his resignation, Lipkin-Shahak was appointed Chairman of the Board of Directors of the Tahal Group. In 2003 Lipkin-Shahak joined the Labor Party, took part in the Geneva Initiative talks and signed the agreement.

In April 2008, Lipkin-Shahak signed a letter of support for the recently created J Street American Jewish pro-peace lobby group.

== See also ==
- History of the Israel Defense Forces
