= Center Party (Israel) =

Center Party מפלגת המרכז
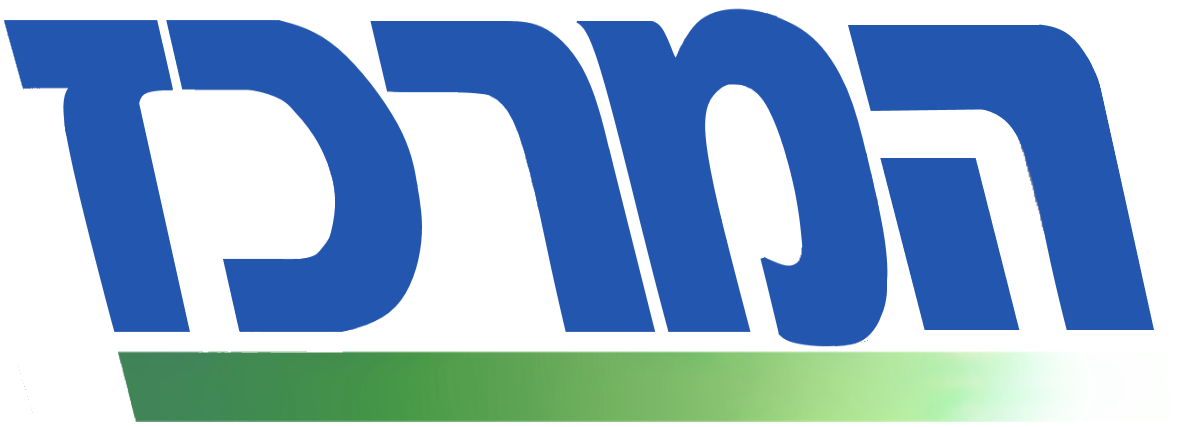
- Leader: Yitzhak Mordechai; Dan Meridor; David Magen
- Founded: 23 February 1999
- Dissolved: 2003
- Split from: Likud-Gesher-Tzomet and Labor
- Headquarters: Ramat Gan
- Ideology: Centrism
- Political position: Center
- Most MKs: 6 (1999–2001)
- Fewest MKs: 3 (2002–2003)

Election symbol
- פה

Website
- hamercaz.org.il

The Center Party (Hebrew: מפלגת המרכז, romanized: Mifleget HaMerkaz), originally known as Israel in the Center, was a short-lived political party in Israel. Formed in 1999 by former Defense Minister Yitzhak Mordechai, the aim was to create a group of moderates to challenge Benjamin Netanyahu on the right and opposition leader Ehud Barak's Labor Party on the left.

== Platform ==
The Center party platform promoted new thinking about national unity, leadership credibility and strategic planning and hoped to establish new institutional rules to guide public life, including a written constitution.

== History ==
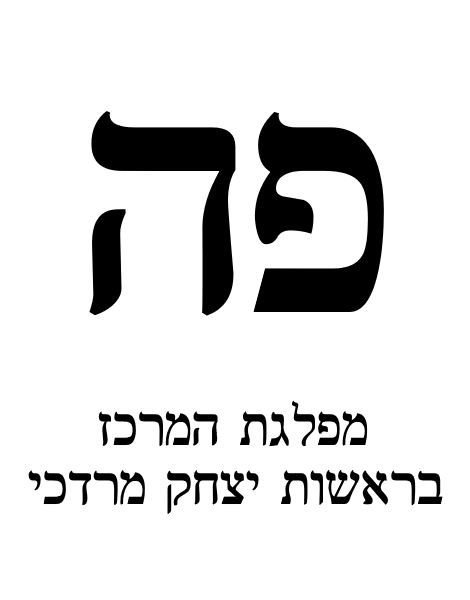
Ballot paper used during the 1999 Election

The party was established on 23 February 1999, towards the end of the 14th Knesset's term, by Mordechai, David Magen and Dan Meridor from Likud, Hagai Meirom and Nissim Zvili of Labor, and Eliezer Sandberg of Tzomet. However, the most significant ally for Mordechai was General Amnon Lipkin-Shahak, the just-retired army Chief-of-Staff who had been a bitter rival for that post in 1994.

The party borrowed many of its themes from The Third Way, a group that split with the Labor Party in 1994 over the latter's willingness to negotiate the return of the Golan Heights to Syria for a peace treaty. However, by 1999 The Third Way was a partner of the Likud government and had lost public support due to its lack of influence on Netanyahu. Mordechai wanted further progress in the Oslo Accords, and clashed with the prime minister and other members of his cabinet.

Bringing Dan Meridor on board was important. One of the Likud's younger members, Meridor had a solid record as minister of justice from 1988 until 1992, was the son of Irgun resistance member and later Knesset member Eliyahu Meridor, and was a civilian counterbalance to Mordechai.

=== 1999 elections ===
Prior to the 1999 elections the party changed its name to the Center Party. Mordechai was also a candidate in the direct election for prime minister but dropped out when it became clear that Ehud Barak was rising in the polls. In the Knesset elections, the Center Party won roughly 5% of the vote, enough for 6 seats.

=== Joining the government ===
The party joined Ehud Barak's One Israel coalition alongside Shas, Meretz, the National Religious Party and Yisrael BaAliyah. Mordechai became Minister of Transport and Deputy Prime Minister, whilst Lipkin-Shahak became Minister of Tourism. Following Shas leaving the coalition in August 2000, former mayor of Tel Aviv, Roni Milo, was made Minister of Health. Mordechai resigned in the wake of a sex scandal on 30 May 2000; Lipkin-Shahak replaced him as Minister of Transport. Milo and former Likud member Yehiel Lasry defected back to Likud, and Rabin-Pelossof, Lipkin, and Uri Savir formed the New Way after Barak lost elections for prime minister to Ariel Sharon in 2001. By the end of the Knesset term most of the party's members left for Likud, with MK David Magen leading the list into the 2003 election.

== Election results ==
Election	Leader	Votes	%	Seats	+/–	Status
1999	Yitzhak Mordechai	165,622	5.0 (#8)	6 / 120	▲6	Government
2003	David Magen	1,961	0.06 (#21)	0 / 120	▼6	Extraparliamentary
