= One Israel =

Former Israeli political alliance

One Israel ישראל אחת
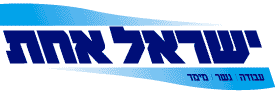
- Leader: Ehud Barak
- Founded: 1999
- Dissolved: 15 May 2001
- Ideology: Zionism; Big tent Social democracy Two-state solution Third Way; Factions: Labor Zionism; Religious Zionism; Sephardic and Mizrahi interests
- Political position: Centre-left
- Member parties: Labor; Meimad; Gesher (until 2001)
- Colors: Blue
- Most MKs: 26 (1999-2001)
- Fewest MKs: 23 (2001)

Election symbol
- אמת

Website
- oneisrael.co.il

One Israel (Hebrew: ישראל אחת, Yisrael Ahat) was an alliance of the Labor Party, Meimad and Gesher created to run for the 1999 Knesset elections.

== Background ==
One Israel was formed by Labor leader Ehud Barak in the run-up to the 1999 elections with the aim of making Labor appear more centrist and to reduce its secularist and elitist reputation amongst Mizrahi voters (Gesher was led by prominent Mizrahi politician and former Likud MK David Levy whilst Meimad is a religious party) modelled on Tony Blair's transformation of the British Labour Party into New Labour. The coalition agreement gave Gesher the number three spot on the list (behind Barak and Shimon Peres), two other safe positions and a promise that Levy would get a ministerial position. Meimad were promised one safe spot on the list and a ministerial position for a member who did not make it into the Knesset.

In the run-up to the election, surveys predicted the party would win 33 seats. However, although One Israel did emerge as the largest faction in the Knesset, its 26 seats were the lowest ever by a winning party (Labor's 34 in the 1996 elections whilst running alone had been the previous low). Of the 26 seats, Labor took 23, Gesher two and Meimad one. As per the pre-election agreement, Levy was appointed Deputy Prime Minister and Minister of Foreign Affairs and Meimad's Michael Melchior was made Minister of Social and Diaspora Affairs.

Barak, who had beaten Binyamin Netanyahu in the election for Prime Minister, had to form an unstable coalition government with six other parties: Shas, Meretz, Yisrael BaAliyah, the Centre Party, the National Religious Party and United Torah Judaism.

Barak's participation in the Camp David Summit with Yasser Arafat in summer 2000 led to Gesher pulling out of the alliance on 7 March 2001. On 7 May the alliance was joined by the single member New Way faction, but on 15 May 2001 it ceased to exist, as the parliamentary group was renamed Labor-Meimad.

After the party's collapse, Barak was investigated following allegations that One Israel had broken the party funding law by allowing money from abroad to be directed into campaign funds through non-profit groups in order to get around spending limits. State Comptroller Eliezer Goldberg had already fined the party 13 million shekels for breaking fund-raising laws. It later became known as the "Barak Organisation Affair".

== Composition ==
Name	Ideology	Position	Leader	15th Knesset	Image
Labor	Social democracy	Centre-left	Ehud Barak	23 / 120	
Gesher	Liberal conservatism	Centre to centre-right	David Levy	2 / 120	
Meimad	Religious Zionism	Centre-left	Michael Melchior	1 / 120	

== Election results ==
Election	Votes	%	Seats	+/–	Leader	Status
1999	670,484 (party) (#1); 1,791,020 (prime ministerial) (#1)	20.3; 56.1	26 / 120	New party	Ehud Barak (won)	Government
2001	1,023,944 (prime ministerial) (#2)	37.6	26 / 120	New party	Ehud Barak (lost)	Government

== Knesset members ==
Knesset term	Seats	Faction	Members
15th (1999–2003)	23	Labor	Ehud Barak, Shimon Peres, Shlomo Ben-Ami, Yossi Beilin, Matan Vilnai, Avraham Burg, Raanan Cohen, Uzi Baram, Dalia Itzik, Binyamin Ben-Eliezer, Haim Ramon, Eli Goldschmidt, Avraham Shochat, Yael Dayan, Ofir Pines-Paz, Ephraim Sneh, Nawaf Massalha, Avraham Yehezkel, Sofa Landver, Salah Tarif, Shalom Simhon, Yossi Katz, Weizman Shiry
15th (1999–2003)	2	Gesher	David Levy, Maxim Levy
15th (1999–2003)	1	Meimad	Michael Melchior
