= 1999 Israeli general election =

- 17 May 1999
- Prime ministerial election
- Turnout: 78.71%
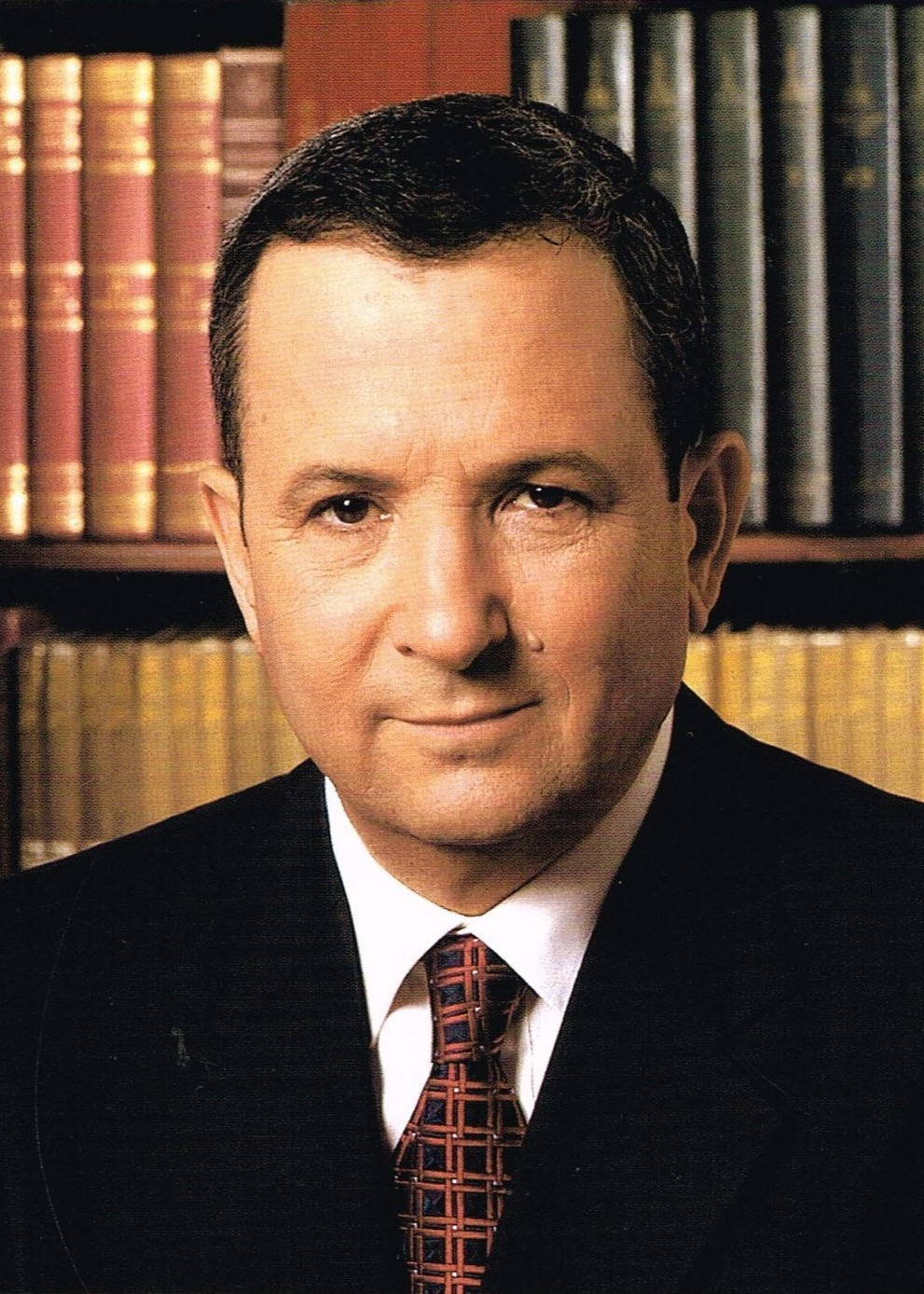

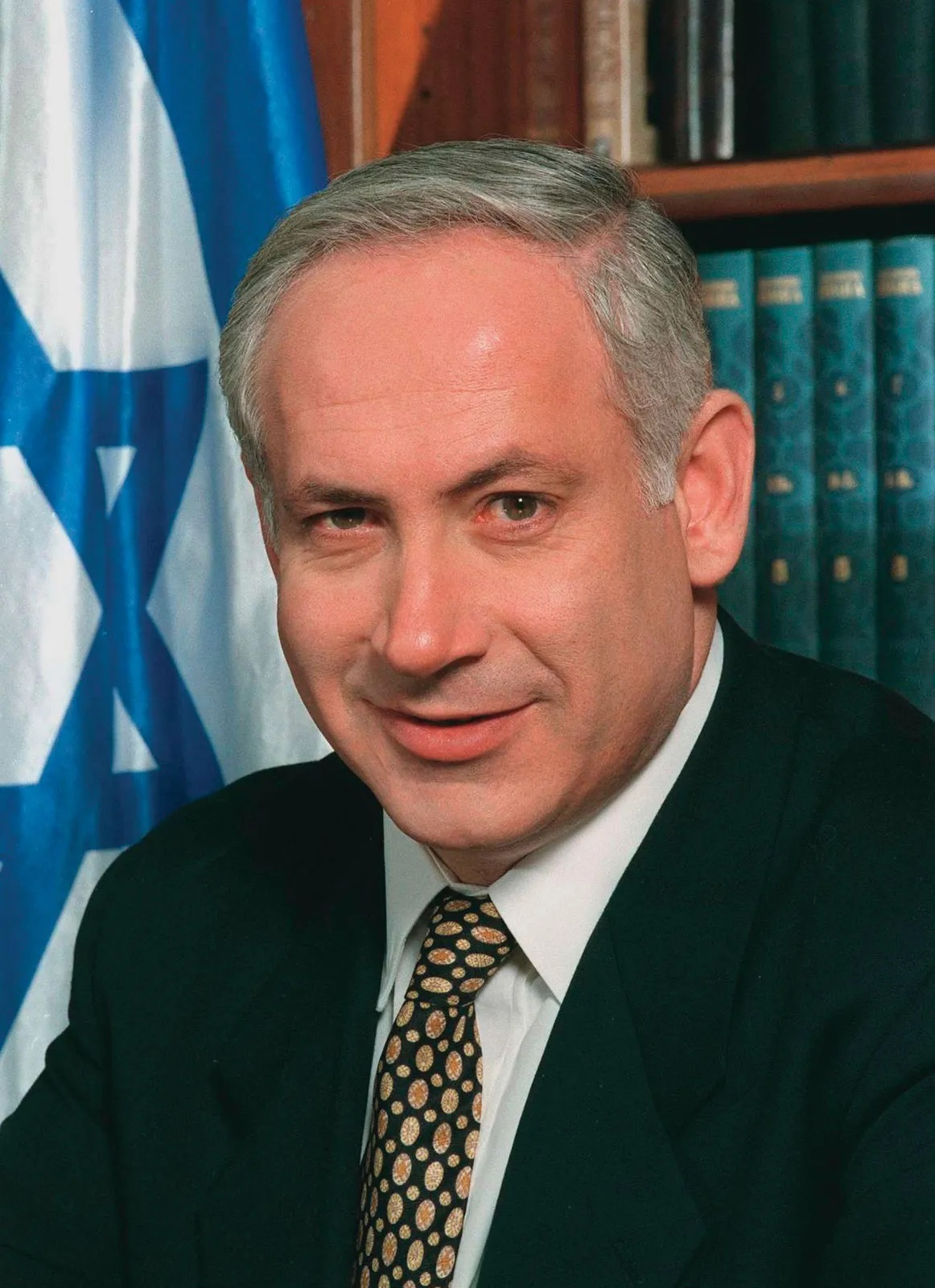
Candidate	Ehud Barak	Benjamin Netanyahu
Party	One Israel	Likud
Popular vote	1,791,020	1,402,474
Percentage	56.08%	43.92%
Prime Minister before election
Benjamin Netanyahu
Likud
Prime Minister after election
Ehud Barak
One Israel
- Knesset election
Party	Leader	Vote %	Seats	+/–
One Israel	Ehud Barak	20.26	26	−13
Likud	Benjamin Netanyahu	14.14	19	−3
Shas	Aryeh Deri	13.01	17	+7
Meretz	Yossi Sarid	7.66	10	+3
Yisrael BaAliyah	Natan Sharansky	5.19	6	−1
Shinui	Tommy Lapid	5.07	6	+4
Centre Party	Yitzhak Mordechai	5.00	6	New
Mafdal	Yitzhak Levi	4.24	5	−4
UTJ	Meir Porush	3.80	5	+1
United Arab List	Abdulmalik Dehamshe	3.47	5	+1
National Union	Benny Begin	3.03	4	+2
Hadash	Mohammad Barakeh	2.63	3	−1
Yisrael Beiteinu	Avigdor Lieberman	2.60	4	New
Balad–Ta'al	Azmi Bishara	2.00	2	+1
One Nation	Amir Peretz	1.94	2	New
This lists parties that won seats. See the complete results below.
Speaker of the Knesset before	Speaker of the Knesset after
Dan Tichon; Likud	Avraham Burg; One Israel

Early general elections for both the prime minister and the Knesset were held in Israel on 17 May 1999 following a vote of no confidence in the government; the incumbent Likud Prime Minister Benjamin Netanyahu, ran for re-election.

The elections were only the second time in Israeli history that the prime minister had been directly elected; the first such election in 1996 had been an extremely tight contest between Benjamin Netanyahu of Likud and Shimon Peres of Labor, with Netanyahu winning by just 29,000 votes.

Labor leader Ehud Barak, promising peace talks with the Palestinians and withdrawal from Lebanon by July 2000, was elected prime minister with 56% of the vote.

== Background ==
In the Israeli–Palestinian peace process, although the Likud government had negotiated the Wye River Memorandum and it had passed the Knesset overwhelmingly in November 1998, subsequent negotiations with the Palestinians were going badly. The lack of progress had alienated support for the government on the left, as well as on its right. The left claimed negotiations were moving too slowly, while the more extreme right were unhappy with the contemplated territorial concessions included in the memorandum itself.

The Likud–Gesher–Tzomet alliance had fallen apart, with more members leaving Likud to set up Herut – The National Movement and the Centre Party.

Netanyahu's government ended due to difficulties in passing the state budget and in January 1999 passed a bill calling for early elections.

Ehud Barak, the leader of the main opposition Labor Party, was Netanyahu's main challenger in this election. Before the elections, Ehud Barak's Labor Party formed an alliance with Gesher and Meimad called One Israel in the hope that a united front on the centre-left would give them enough seats to form a more stable coalition.

The rising death toll and lack of military victory in Israel's long-running occupation in south Lebanon had soured voter support for the Likud policy.

Benny Begin, Michael Kleiner and David Re'em broke away from Likud over Benjamin Netanyahu's acceptance of the Wye River Memorandum and the Hebron Agreement, which had ceded land to the Palestinians. They formed a new party, Herut – The National Movement, which gained the tacit backing of former PM Yitzhak Shamir. At the same time, Hanan Porat and Zvi Hendel left the National Religious Party as they accepted these agreements as well, forming the Tkuma party. Tkuma and Herut joined the ultranationalist Moledet to create the National Union.

Tzomet, Likud's other former partner, risked losing much of its voter base to the new alliance and tried to join, but its entry was denied.

== Parliament factions ==
The table below lists the parliamentary factions represented in the 14th Knesset.

Name	Ideology	Symbol	Leader	1996 result		Seats at 1999 dissolution
Name	Ideology	Symbol	Leader	Votes (%)	Seats	Seats at 1999 dissolution
Labor (in One Israel)	Social democracy	אמת	Ehud Barak	26.8%	34 / 120	29 / 120
Likud	National liberalism Conservatism	מחל	Benjamin Netanyahu	25.1%	24 / 120	19 / 120
Gesher (in One Israel)	Liberal conservatism Economic egalitarianism	-	David Levy	25.1%	5 / 120	3 / 120
Tzomet	Nationalism; Secularism	-	Rafael Eitan	25.1%	3 / 120	2 / 120
Shas	Religious conservatism Populism	שס	Aryeh Deri	8.5%	10 / 120	10 / 120
Mafdal	Religious Zionism	ב	Yitzhak Levi	7.9%	9 / 120	7 / 120
Meretz	Progressivism; Secularism	מרצ	Yossi Sarid	7.4%	9 / 120	6 / 120
Yisrael BaAliyah	Russian speakers' interests	כן	Natan Sharansky	5.7%	7 / 120	5 / 120
UTJ	Religious conservatism	ג	Avraham Yosef Shapira	3.2%	4 / 120	4 / 120
Hadash	Communism; Socialism	ו	Tawfiq Ziad	4.2%	3 / 120	3 / 120
Balad	Palestinian nationalism	ד	Azmi Bishara	4.2%	2 / 120	2 / 120
Third Way	Golan Heights regionalism	הד	Avigdor Kahalani	3.2%	4 / 120	3 / 120
Ra'am-Mada	Israeli Arab interests	עם	Abdulwahab Darawshe	2.9%	4 / 120	4 / 120
Moledet (in National Union)	Ultranationalism	ט	Rehavam Ze'evi	2.4%	2 / 120	3 / 120
Centre Party	Centrism	פה	Yitzhak Mordechai	-	did not exist	5 / 120
Shinui	Secularism; Liberalism	יש	Tommy Lapid	-	part of Meretz (Note: Shinui won 2 seats in 1996 as part of Meretz.)	3 / 120
Herut – The National Movement (in National Union)	Right-wing populism National conservatism	-	Benny Begin	-	did not exist	3 / 120
One Nation	Social democracy Labourism	ם	Amir Peretz	-	did not exist	3 / 120
Tkuma (in National Union)	Religious Zionism		Hanan Porat	-	did not exist	2 / 120
Yisrael HaMithadeshet (in Yisrael Beiteinu)	Russian Israeli interests	-	Michael Nudelman	-	did not exist	2 / 120
Independent (Note: David Zucker, who left Meretz, and Emanuel Zisman, who left the Third Way.)						2 / 120

== Campaign ==
Initially, three other candidates planned to run; these included: Benny Begin of Herut – The National Movement, running to the right of Likud; Azmi Bishara of the Israeli Arab Balad party, running to the left of One Israel and the first from that minority to stand for prime minister, and; Yitzhak Mordechai of the Centre Party, running on positions between those of Likud on the right and One Israel on the left.

Over the course of the campaign however, Begin, Bishara and Mordechai all dropped out of the race for prime minister, after it became clear that they could not win, and that their continued presence would cost votes for the major candidates, Barak and Netanyahu, at their respective ends of the political spectrum. The parties these other candidates represented however, continued to run in the concurrent Knesset elections. Mordechai did not withdraw until two days before the election, after he and his party had run a series of advertisements.

Two parties, Manhigut Yehudit and Voice of the Environment, initially signed up to participate in the elections, but withdrew their candidacy before election day.

Both Meretz and Yisrael BaAliyah stressed the need to overtake Shas so that its influence on the next government would be limited. Meretz did this because of Shas's participation in Netanyahu's government, while Yisrael BaAliyah, who was also in that government, was against Shas for obstructing the citizenship process for arrivals of the 1990s post-Soviet aliyah. Yisrael BaAliyah demanded that they be given the Ministry of Interior (which oversees the citizenship process) as a pre-requisite of joining a government coalition, which Ehud Barak fulfilled after becoming prime minister.

Shas campaigned on resolving economic injustices towards the Mizrahi community, and protested the perceived 'excessive rights' given to Soviet migrants.

Meretz specifically attacked Shas by saying it would serve Netanyahu's needs whether it be in a left-wing or right-wing coalition, and criticised One Nation, the Greens, the Pnina Rosenblum list and Shinui for being 'one-issue parties' that siphoned off votes that Meretz needed to beat Shas. Furthermore, Meretz highlighted the need to reform marriage law and improve the situation of tenants.

Mafdal campaigned on returning 'traditional values' to Israel and attacked Meretz for wanting 'freedom from Judaism'.

Hadash's affiliated newspaper, Al-Ittihad, published articles showing outright hostility towards Balad for 'burning' votes in the local elections in Nazareth, causing Ra'am to gain power. These articles made the (incorrect) prediction that Balad had no chance of making it to the next Knesset, pointing out how its predecessor, the Progressive List for Peace failed to cross the threshold in the 1992 elections.

=== Endorsements by parties ===
Candidate	Party	Other parties supporting
Netanyahu	Likud	Shas
Netanyahu	Likud	UTJ
Netanyahu	Likud	Yisrael Beiteinu
Barak	One Israel	Meretz

=== Party slogans ===
Party or alliance	Original slogan	English translation
Likud	"לא נתפשר על בטחון ישראל - הליכוד, מנהיגות חזקה"	“We will not compromise on Israel's security - Likud, strong leadership”
One Israel	"אין שלום אין בטחון – ביבי כשלון"	"There is no peace, there is no security, Bibi is a failure"
Mafdal	"נותנים את הנשמה למדינה"	"Giving one's soul to the country"
Meretz	"מרצ - להיות חופשי בארצנו" (Note: This is a direct reference to a line in Israel's national anthem, Hatikvah.)	"Meretz - to be free in our country"
Meretz	"מי תהיה המפלגה השלישית - מרצ או ש"ס? אתם תחליטו"	"Which party will finish in third — Meretz or Shas? You decide."
UTJ	"בלי תורה- אין שלום, אין ביטחון"	"Without a Torah, there is no peace, there is no security"
Hadash	"אתם רואים טוב!"	"You're seeing this correctly!"
Hadash	"عندك نظرة!"	"You're seeing this correctly!"
Hadash	"הכי רחוק מנתניהו"	"The furthest away from Netanyahu"
Shinui	"יש לפיד לחילונים"	"There is a torch [Lapid] for secularists"
Yisrael BaAliyah	"МВД под ШАС контроль? Нет, МВД под наш контроль."	"The Ministry of Interior under Shas' control? No, the Ministry of Interior under our control.
Yisrael BaAliyah	"МВД под наш контроль - и жильё под наш контроль"	"The Ministry of Interior under our control, and [the Ministry of] Housing under our control [as well].
Center Party	"ישראל צריכה מרכז חזק"	"Israel needs a strong center"
National Union	"יש עם מי - האיחוד הלאומי"	"There is someone to rely on - the National Union"
Yisrael Beiteinu	"ליברמן- מילה זאת מילה"	"Lieberman - a word is a word"
One Nation	"עובדים עם כל הכוח"	"Working with all our might"
The Third Way	"אנחנו כאן בגלל הגולן"	"We are here because of the Golan Heights"

== Debates ==
Date	Organizer	Moderator	P Present I Invitee N Non-invitee		
Date	Organizer	Moderator	Likud	Center Party	Refs
	Mashal Ham		P Benjamin Netanyahu	P Yitzhak Mordechai	

== Electoral system ==
The 120 seats in the Knesset are elected by closed list proportional representation in a single nationwide constituency. The electoral threshold for the election was 1.5%. This implied that a party with this total would win 2 seats.

=== Surplus-vote agreements ===
Two party lists can sign a surplus-vote agreement that allows them to compete for leftover seats as though they are running together on the same list. The Bader–Ofer method disproportionately favors larger lists, meaning that such an alliance is more likely to receive leftover seats than both of its comprising lists would be individually. The agreement requires both parties to cross the threshold for the agreement to activate. If the alliance receives leftover seats, the Bader–Ofer calculation is then applied afterwards between the two, to determine how the seats are divided among the two allied lists. The following agreements were signed by parties prior to the election:

- One Israel – Meretz
- Likud – Mafdal
- Hadash – Ra'am
- UTJ – Shas
- Yisrael BaAliyah – National Union
- One Nation – Yisrael Beiteinu
- Pnina Rosenblum – Power for Pensioners
- Shinui – Greens
- Centre Party – Third Way

== Results ==
=== Prime minister ===
Candidate	Party	Votes	%
Ehud Barak	One Israel	1,791,020	56.08
Benjamin Netanyahu	Likud	1,402,474	43.92
Total		3,193,494	100.00
Valid votes		3,193,494	94.68
Invalid/blank votes		179,458	5.32
Total votes		3,372,952	100.00
Registered voters/turnout		4,285,428	78.71
Source: Nohlen et al.

=== Knesset (Note: Seat changes for lists formed or split since 1996 are counted from their predecessors' seats: One Israel as a combination of Labor (34) and Gesher (5), Likud (22) without Gesher or Tzomet (5), separate Meretz (7) and Shinui (2), separate Hadash (4) and Balad (1), and National Union succeeding Moledet.) ===
Party	Votes	%	Seats	+/–
One Israel	670,484	20.26	26	−13
Likud	468,103	14.14	19	−3
Shas	430,676	13.01	17	+7
Meretz	253,525	7.66	10	+3
Yisrael BaAliyah	171,705	5.19	6	−1
Shinui	167,748	5.07	6	+4
Centre Party	165,622	5.00	6	New
National Religious Party	140,307	4.24	5	−4
United Torah Judaism	125,741	3.80	5	+1
United Arab List	114,810	3.47	5	−1
National Union	100,181	3.03	4	+2
Hadash	87,022	2.63	3	−1
Yisrael Beiteinu	86,153	2.60	4	New
Balad–Ta'al	66,103	2.00	2	+1
One Nation	64,143	1.94	2	New
Pnina Rosenblum	44,953	1.36	0	New
Power for Pensioners	37,525	1.13	0	New
Ale Yarok	34,029	1.03	0	New
The Third Way	26,290	0.79	0	–4
Green Party	13,292	0.40	0	New
Tikva	7,366	0.22	0	New
Casino Party	6,540	0.20	0	New
Lev LaOlim	6,311	0.19	0	New
Negev Party	4,324	0.13	0	New
Tzomet	4,128	0.12	0	−5
Natural Law Party	2,924	0.09	0	New
Progressive Center Party	2,797	0.08	0	New
Da'am Workers Party	2,151	0.06	0	0
New Arab Party	2,042	0.06	0	New
Justice for All	1,257	0.04	0	New
Moreshet Avot	1,164	0.04	0	New
Total	3,309,416	100.00	120	0
Valid votes	3,309,416	98.09		
Invalid/blank votes	64,332	1.91		
Total votes	3,373,748	100.00		
Registered voters/turnout	4,285,428	78.73		
Source: IDI, Nohlen et al.

Yisrael Beiteinu gained a seat after the vote-sharing process was completed.

== Aftermath ==
Although Barak won the prime ministerial election comfortably, his One Israel alliance won only 26 seats, meaning he had to form a convoluted coalition with Shas, Meretz, Yisrael BaAliyah, the Centre Party, the National Religious Party and United Torah Judaism.

When Barak's government collapsed after the start of the Second Intifada and the October Israeli Arab riots in 2000, Barak called new elections for prime minister in the hope of winning an authoritative mandate. However, he was well-beaten by Ariel Sharon and subsequently retired from politics.

=== 15th Knesset ===
After winning the prime ministerial elections, Ehud Barak formed the 28th government of Israel on 6 July 1999. His coalition included One Israel, Shas, Meretz, Yisrael BaAliyah, the Centre Party, the National Religious Party and United Torah Judaism, and initially had 16 ministers, though the number later rose to 24. Avraham Burg was appointed as Speaker of the Knesset.

United Torah Judaism left the coalition in September 1999 after a breach of the Sabbath. The government finally collapsed on 10 December 2000 when Barak resigned in the face of the outbreak of the Second Intifada and the Israeli Arab riots of October. Barak called new elections for the position of prime minister, which he lost to Ariel Sharon.

Sharon formed the 29th government on 7 March 2001. He set up a national unity government, including Likud, Labor-Meimad, Shas, the Centre Party, the National Religious Party, United Torah Judaism, Yisrael BaAliyah, and National Union-Yisrael Beiteinu. Sharon's government had 26 ministers, which later rose to 29, necessitating the addition of a small table to the end of the Ministers row in the Knesset.

During the Knesset term, there were several splits, mergers, and defections. The One Israel alliance broke into its constituent parts, Labor-Meimad (25 seats) and Gesher (2 seats). Five members left the Centre Party, with three forming New Way and two establishing Lev, which immediately merged into Likud. Later, two of the three that set up New Way resigned from the Knesset and were replaced by Centre Party members, whilst the remaining New Way MK joined Labor-Meimad. Two MKs left Yisrael BaAliyah to establish the Democratic Choice, whilst three MKs left the United Arab List; two established the Arab National Party and one formed National Unity – National Progressive Alliance. Michael Kleiner left the National Union to establish Herut – The National Movement, whilst the National Union became allied to Yisrael Beiteinu. Ahmad Tibi broke up the Balad–Ta'al alliance and sat in a separate Ta'al faction.

== See also ==
- 1999 Israeli Labor Party primary
- Party lists for the 1999 Israeli general election
