= Avigdor Lieberman =

Israeli politician (born 1958)

- אביגדור ליברמן
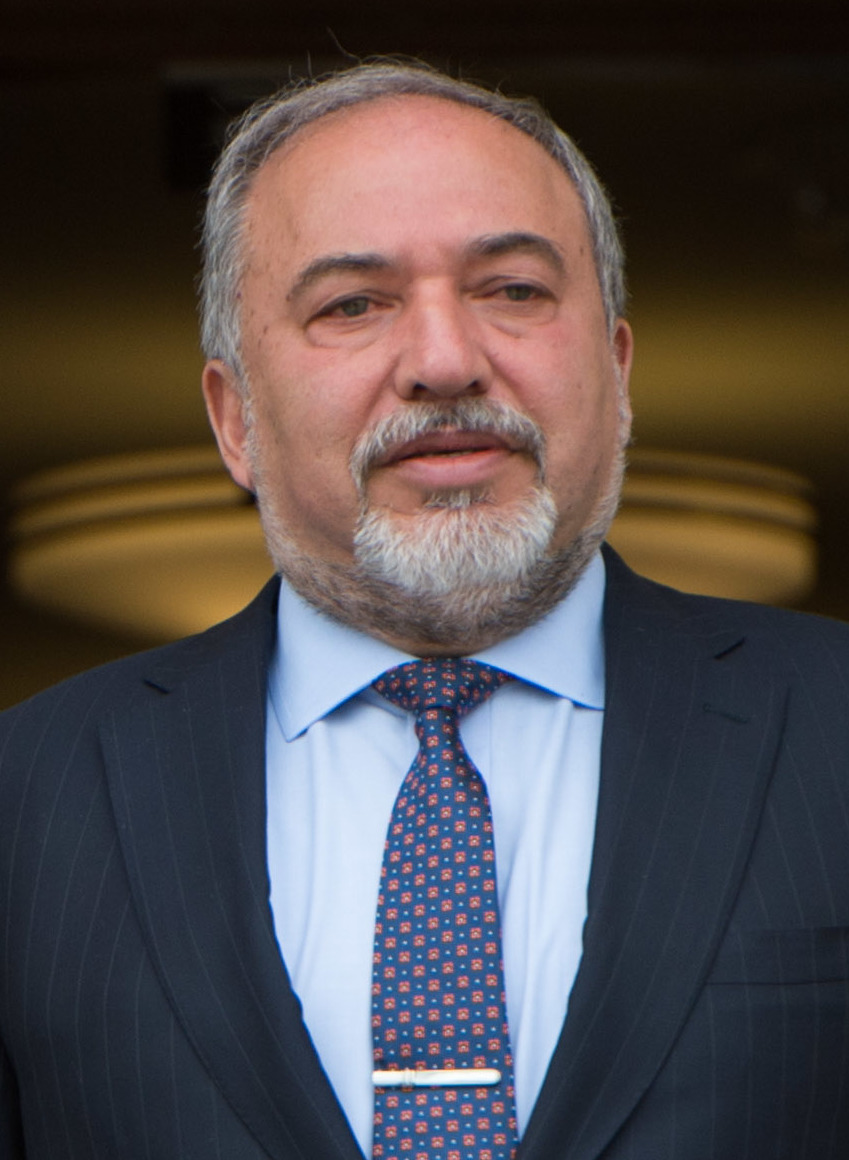
- Lieberman in 2017

Ministerial roles
- 2001–2002: Minister of National Infrastructure
- 2003–2004: Minister of Transportation
- 2006–2008: Deputy Prime Minister
- 2006–2008: Minister of Strategic Affairs
- 2009–2012: Deputy Prime Minister
- 2009–2012: Minister of Foreign Affairs
- 2013–2015: Minister of Foreign Affairs
- 2016–2018: Minister of Defense
- 2021–2022: Minister of Finance

Faction represented in the Knesset
- 1999–2003: Yisrael Beiteinu
- 2003–2006: National Union
- 2006–2016: Yisrael Beiteinu
- 2019–2021: Yisrael Beiteinu
- 2022–: Yisrael Beiteinu

Personal details
- Born: Evet L'vovich Liberman; 5 July 1958 (age 68) Chișinău, Moldavian SSR, Soviet Union
- Citizenship: Israel (since 1978)
- Party: Yisrael Beiteinu (since 1999)
- Other political affiliations: Likud (1988–1997)
- Spouse: Ella Tzipkin
- Children: 3
- Parent(s): Lev Lieberman; Esther Markovna
- Education: Chișinău Agriculture Institute (no degree); Hebrew University of Jerusalem (BA)

Avigdor Lieberman (Hebrew: אביגדור ליברמן; born 5 June 1958) is an Israeli politician who served as minister of finance between 2021 and 2022, having previously served twice as deputy prime minister of Israel from 2006 to 2008 and 2009 to 2012.

Born and raised in Soviet Moldova, Lieberman immigrated to Israel with his family in 1978. He entered the Knesset in 1999, and has served in numerous roles in the government, including as Minister of National Infrastructure, Minister of Transportation, and Minister of Strategic Affairs. He served as Deputy Prime Minister under Prime Ministers Ehud Olmert and Benjamin Netanyahu. He served under Netanyahu as Minister of Foreign Affairs from 2009 to 2012 and 2013 to 2015 and as Minister of Defense from 2016 to 2018. On 14 November 2018, he resigned as Defense Minister because of a ceasefire in Gaza which he characterized as "surrendering to terror."

He is the founder and leader of the secular nationalist Yisrael Beiteinu (Israel Our Home) party, whose electoral base initially consisted overwhelmingly of Russian-speaking immigrants from the former Soviet Union, but later attracted broader support. Lieberman has stated his opposition to forming a coalition with religious parties and refused to join Benjamin Netanyahu's coalition in April 2019. As a result of the arrival in Israel during the 1990s of about one million Russian-speaking immigrants, Yisrael Beiteinu has regularly played the "king-maker" role in Israel's coalition governments. He was replaced in the Knesset by Elina Bardach-Yalov when he became the finance minister.

Lieberman is a polarizing figure in Israeli politics due to his hardliner positions on the Israeli-Palestinian conflict. His name is associated with the 2004 Lieberman Plan, which advocates land swaps between Israel and the Palestinian Authority and the barring of Arab Israelis from Israeli citizenship unless they swear a loyalty oath to Israel. While this has been decried as discriminatory, this however makes him unique among right-wing Israeli figures in that he is not categorically opposed to any form of two-state solution and even ready to cede land from the pre-1967 borders. He is nonetheless also known for rhetoric considered violent and hawkish in times of military escalation. During the 2018–2019 Gaza border protests and the Gaza war, he iterated that there are "no innocents in Gaza".

== Early life ==
The Lieberman family in 1977. From right to left: Lev, Esther and their son, Avigdor

Evet L'vovich Lieberman (Russian: Эвет Львович Либерман) was born to a Russian-speaking Jewish family in Chișinău, Moldavian SSR, Soviet Union (now Moldova). His father Lev (18 May 1921 – 2 July 2007) was a writer who had served in the Red Army and spent seven years in a Siberian exile under Joseph Stalin's rule, where he met his wife Esther (2 July 1923 – 4 December 2014). His parents imbued him with a strong secular Jewish identity and consciously taught him only Yiddish up until the age of three. They were not afraid to speak Yiddish in public, even on crowded buses. Inheriting a love of Russian literature from his father, Lieberman had dreamed of becoming a poet. Lieberman attributes his forthright personality to his youth in the large Jewish community of 1970s Chișinău, saying: "Jews were 25 percent of the population of Kishinev [Chișinău] [during the 1970s]… We were more affluent, better educated, and we showed it… The Jews of Moldova have this no-nonsense streak. They are 'doers,' not idle philosophers. No wonder Meir Dizengoff, another Jew from Moldova, established Tel Aviv".

After high school, Lieberman enrolled at the Chișinău Agriculture Institute majoring in hydrological land improvement. As a student in Moldova, his passion for Russian literary classics continued, as he won first prize for a play he wrote, and dreamed of a literary career.

== Move to Israel ==
Lieberman and his family immigrated to Israel on 18 June 1978. Lieberman studied Hebrew at an ulpan and changed his first name to Avigdor. He was conscripted into the Israel Defense Forces, and was only obligated to do one year of active service instead of three, during which he served in the IDF military government in Hebron. Following his discharge from active duty, he continued to be called up for the reserves. After undergoing an artillery course, he served in the Artillery Corps. He attained the rank of Corporal.

Upon his release from the army, he earned a BA in International Relations and Political Science from the Hebrew University of Jerusalem.

On campus he was active in the student group "Kastel," associated with the Likud. Relations between Kastel and Arab student groups were tense and often deteriorated into violence. According to Maariv, based on the testimony of a witness who was a student at the time, Lieberman participated in a few of the violent clashes. Lieberman said that he was involved in two. Jamal Zahalka, an Arab Knesset member from Balad who was also a student at the time and active in Arab groups, claimed that he remembers Lieberman as yelling a lot but avoiding any of the rough action.

Haaretz reported that Lieberman was briefly involved with the Kach party founded by Rabbi Meir Kahane based on the testimony of two Kach activists, Avigdor Eskin and Yosef Dayan. Lieberman denied this and called the publication an "orchestrated provocation". While studying at the Hebrew University, Lieberman worked as a bouncer at the student club "Shablul" (Hebrew: "snail"), which is where he met his future wife. A year later, Lieberman was promoted to general manager, responsible for all the activities at the club.

== Family ==
Lieberman and his wife Ella née Tzipkin, also a Moldovan immigrant to Israel, have a daughter Michal (born 22 June 1983) and two sons, Yaakov (born 15 March 1988) and Amos (born 14 September 1990). They live in the Israeli settlement of Nokdim, located in the Judean Desert of the West Bank, where they have resided since 1988. Lieberman stated that despite having lived there for so long he is willing to leave his home as part of a peace agreement.

Lieberman's mother, Esther Lieberman, died on 4 December 2014 while Lieberman was in Switzerland.

== Career ==
In breaks between government stints, Lieberman has engaged in business endeavors such as importing wood from the former Soviet Union into Israel, through which he amassed a fortune. He speaks Russian, Romanian, Hebrew, Yiddish and (less fluently) English.

== Political career ==
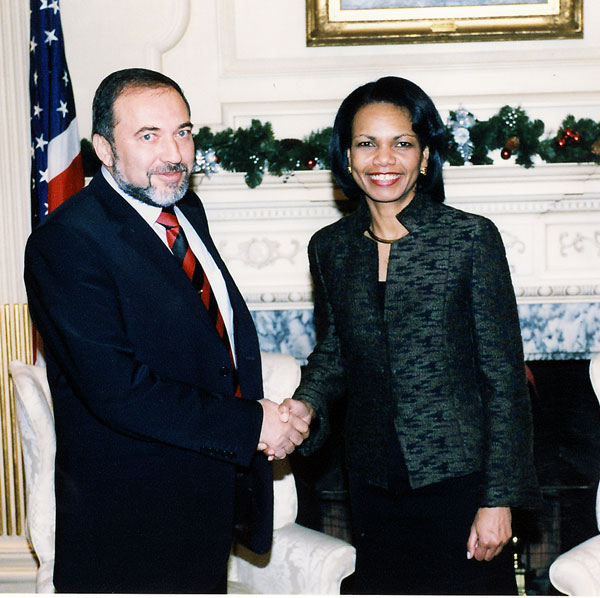
Lieberman and US Secretary of State Condoleezza Rice

In 1983–1988, Lieberman helped found the Zionist Forum for Soviet Jewry and was a member of the Board of the Jerusalem Economic Corporation and the Secretary of the Jerusalem branch of the Histadrut Ovdim Le'umit ("National Workers' Union"). In 1988, he started working with Benjamin Netanyahu. From 1993 to 1996, following Netanyahu's election as party leader, Lieberman served as Director-General of the Likud party. After Netanyahu was elected Prime Minister, Lieberman served as Director-General of the Prime Minister's Office from 1996 to 1997.

In 1997, Lieberman resigned from Likud after Prime Minister Netanyahu granted concessions to the Palestinians in the Wye River Memorandum, and expressed disappointment when Yisrael BaAliyah, a new immigrant party headed by Natan Sharansky did not quit the coalition government in protest. In 1999, Lieberman formed the Yisrael Beiteinu party to create a platform for Soviet immigrants who supported a hard line in negotiations with the Palestinians. The party ran for the Knesset during the 1999 legislative election, and ran on a joint list with Aliyah, a party formed by Michael Nudelman and Yuri Stern, who had broken away from Yisrael BaAliyah. The new party won four seats, one of which was taken by Lieberman. Lieberman served on the Foreign Affairs and Defense Committee and State Control Committee, and as Chairman of the Israel-Moldova Parliamentary Friendship League.

My countryman may be a Jew, a Muslim, a Christian – I do not differentiate people by religion. Let them be religious or secular, the main thing is that they are a true citizen of the State of Israel.

— Avigdor Lieberman, 2005

In March 2001, Lieberman was appointed Minister of National Infrastructure, but resigned in March 2002.

In the 2003 legislative election, Yisrael Beiteinu ran on a joint list with the National Union. The joint list won seven seats, with Yisrael Beiteinu allotted four of them. In February 2003, Lieberman was appointed Minister of Transport, and resigned from the Knesset to take a seat in the Cabinet. He maintained leadership of the party and returned to the Knesset in 2006. Later he would simultaneously serve in the Knesset and Cabinet.

In May 2004, Lieberman was dismissed from the cabinet by Prime Minister Ariel Sharon due to his opposition to the Gaza disengagement, and Yisrael Beiteinu left the government in June in protest of the disengagement.

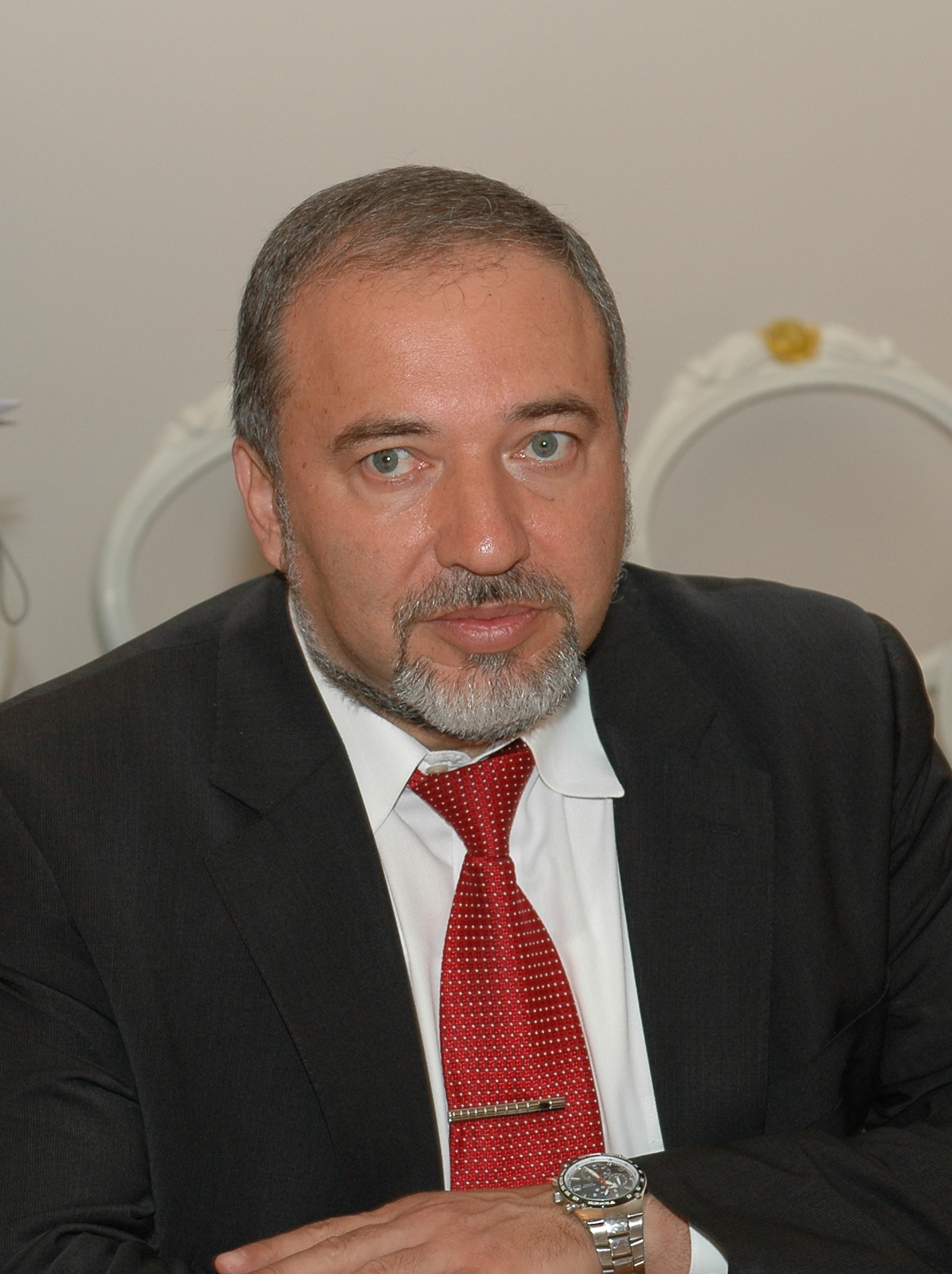
Lieberman in Latvia 2010

In the 2006 legislative election, Lieberman's party split from the National Union to run alone. The party won eleven seats, a gain from its previous six seats. It was initially in the opposition, but in October 2006, Lieberman and Prime Minister Ehud Olmert signed a coalition agreement under which Lieberman became the Deputy Prime Minister and Minister of Strategic Affairs, a newly created position with a focus towards the strategic threat from Iran. In December 2006, he called Iranian nuclear proliferation "the biggest threat facing the Jewish people since the Second World War". He advocated that Israel join the European Union and NATO.

Lieberman resigned his cabinet position and Yisrael Beiteinu left the coalition in January 2008. He cited opposition to the resuming peace talks, saying that "Negotiations on the basis of land for peace are a critical mistake ... and will destroy us."

Yisrael Beiteinu, which was described at times as Lieberman's "one man's party" for its media-closed meetings and party members' reluctance to give interviews, emerged as the third largest party in Israel after 2009 legislative election and on 16 March, it entered the coalition government led by Prime Minister Benjamin Netanyahu. Lieberman was appointed Minister of Foreign Affairs and Deputy Prime Minister.

On 25 October 2012, Lieberman and Benjamin Netanyahu announced that their respective political parties, Likud and Yisrael Beiteinu, had merged and would run together on a single ballot in Israel's 22 January 2013 general elections. "In view of the challenges we're facing, we need responsibility on a national level.... We're providing a true alternative, and an opportunity for the citizens to stabilize leadership and government," Lieberman said.

Lieberman was appointed Minister of Defense in May 2016. He resigned from the Knesset under the Norwegian Law, allowing Yulia Malinovsky to replace him.

Lieberman has attracted interest of voters from Israel's business community. Former ambassador to the United States Danny Gillerman explains: "His agenda is interesting, especially the combination between his vigorous opposition to a state of halakha and his uncompromising condition of the formation of a national-unity government. There is a yearning for leadership, and this milieu is fed up with the parties and with religious coercion." Dalia Itzik has said "He represents the historic Mapai today."

=== Minister of Foreign Affairs ===
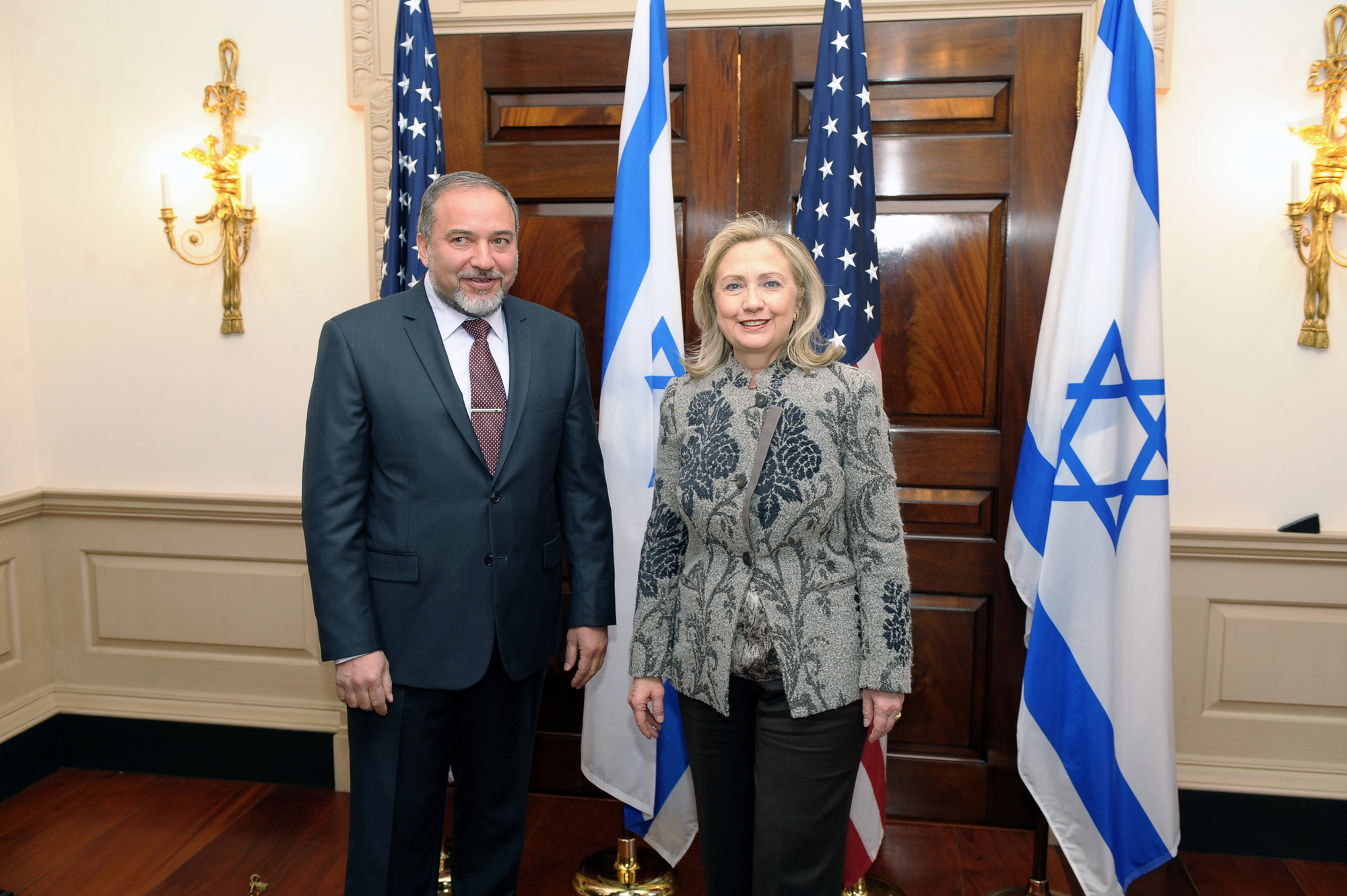
Lieberman with U.S. Secretary of State Hillary Clinton, 16 July 2012

Upon taking office as the Minister of Foreign Affairs, Lieberman posed a clear message against application of provisions discussed at the Annapolis Conference. He noted that Israel must abide by the road map for peace as a first phase for furtherance of the negotiations process as well as by the two accompanying Tenet and Zinni documents.

Lieberman quit Olmert government due to his opposition to the Annapolis Conference. Lieberman followed his 1 April message with concerns that "[others] stand over us with a stopwatch" and that responsible and serious formulations of policy will take between one and two months.

Lieberman's office stated in early April that peace talks would continue when Palestinian government officials cracked down on attacks against Israelis. Lieberman and Netanyahu planned to broaden the Foreign Ministry PR campaign with regard to Iran, focusing on abuse of human rights and sponsorship of terrorism. Lieberman was questioned three times on charges of corruption.

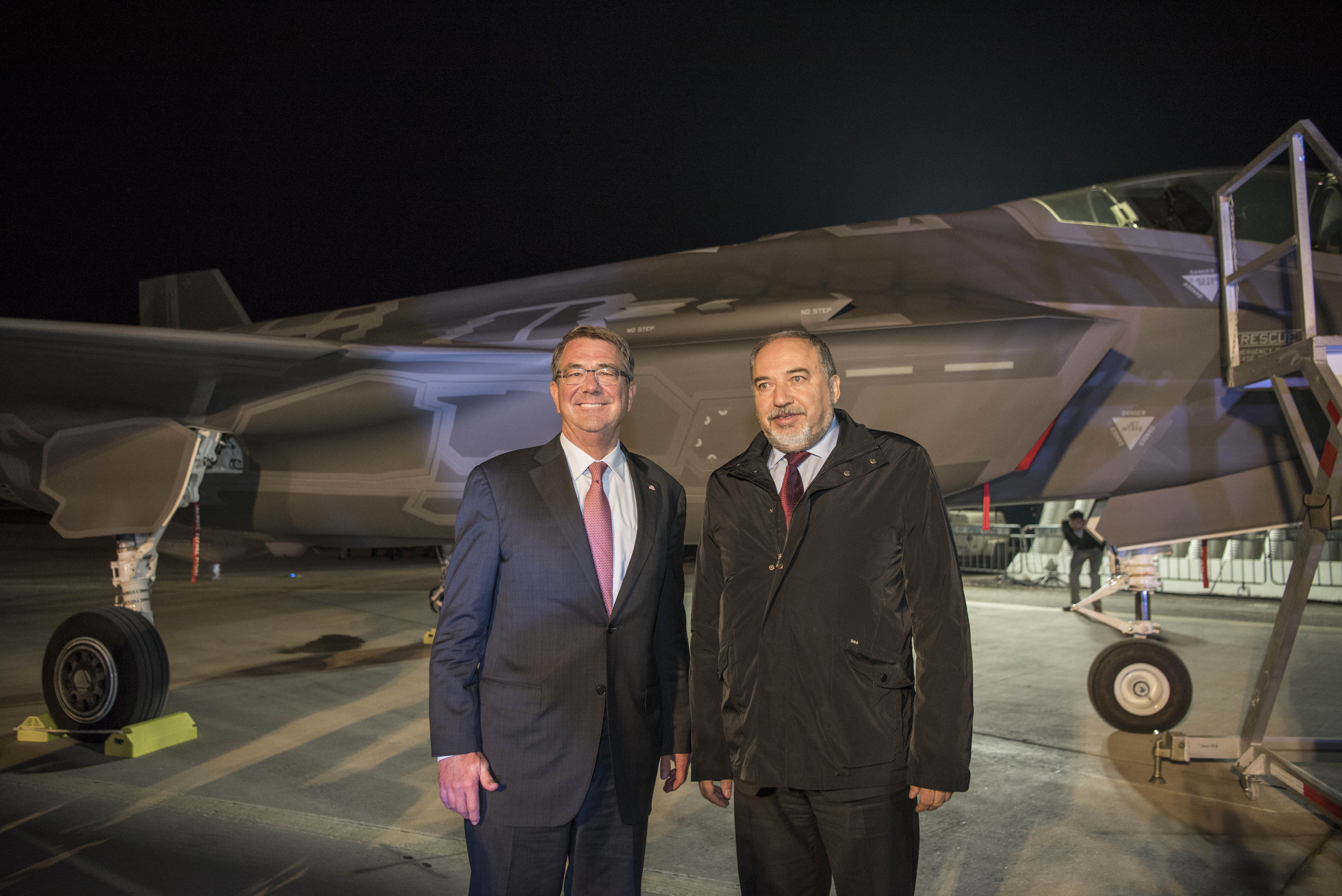
Lieberman and Ashton Carter in front of the F-35 fighter

In early May 2009, Lieberman visited Rome, Paris, Prague, and other cities. He met with his foreign minister counterparts, such as Frank-Walter Steinmeier of Germany, and he also paid his respects at Berlin's Holocaust memorial, laying a wreath at the 19,000-square-meter monument. At a press conference in Italy, Avigdor Lieberman stated that the government's goal was not to produce slogans or make pompous declarations, but to reach concrete results.

In his remarks at the 2013 Sderot Conference for Society, Lieberman stated his support of multi-directional foreign policy. The weight of his statement came at a time when a preliminary deal between Israel and the US with Iran, which would partially freeze its nuclear program, was in opposition.

On 7 May, Lieberman was appointed minister in charge of strategic dialogue with the U.S. On 17 June, he appeared in a joint press conference with Secretary of State Hillary Clinton in his first official visit to the U.S. Lieberman clashed with Clinton over Israeli settlements. Financial Times described the meeting as "one of the most tense encounters between the sides for several years". Clinton also rejected Lieberman's assertion that the Bush administration had agreed to further building in the West Bank.

In September 2009, Lieberman toured Africa along with businessmen and officials from the Foreign Ministry, Finance Ministry, Defense Ministry, and National Security Council in an attempt to strengthen economic and trade ties and discuss the Iranian nuclear program. Lieberman also sought to strengthen ties with countries in Eastern and Central Europe. In a 2011 interview, Netanyahu said that Lieberman had opened important doors that had been closed to Israel before.

=== Minister of Defense ===
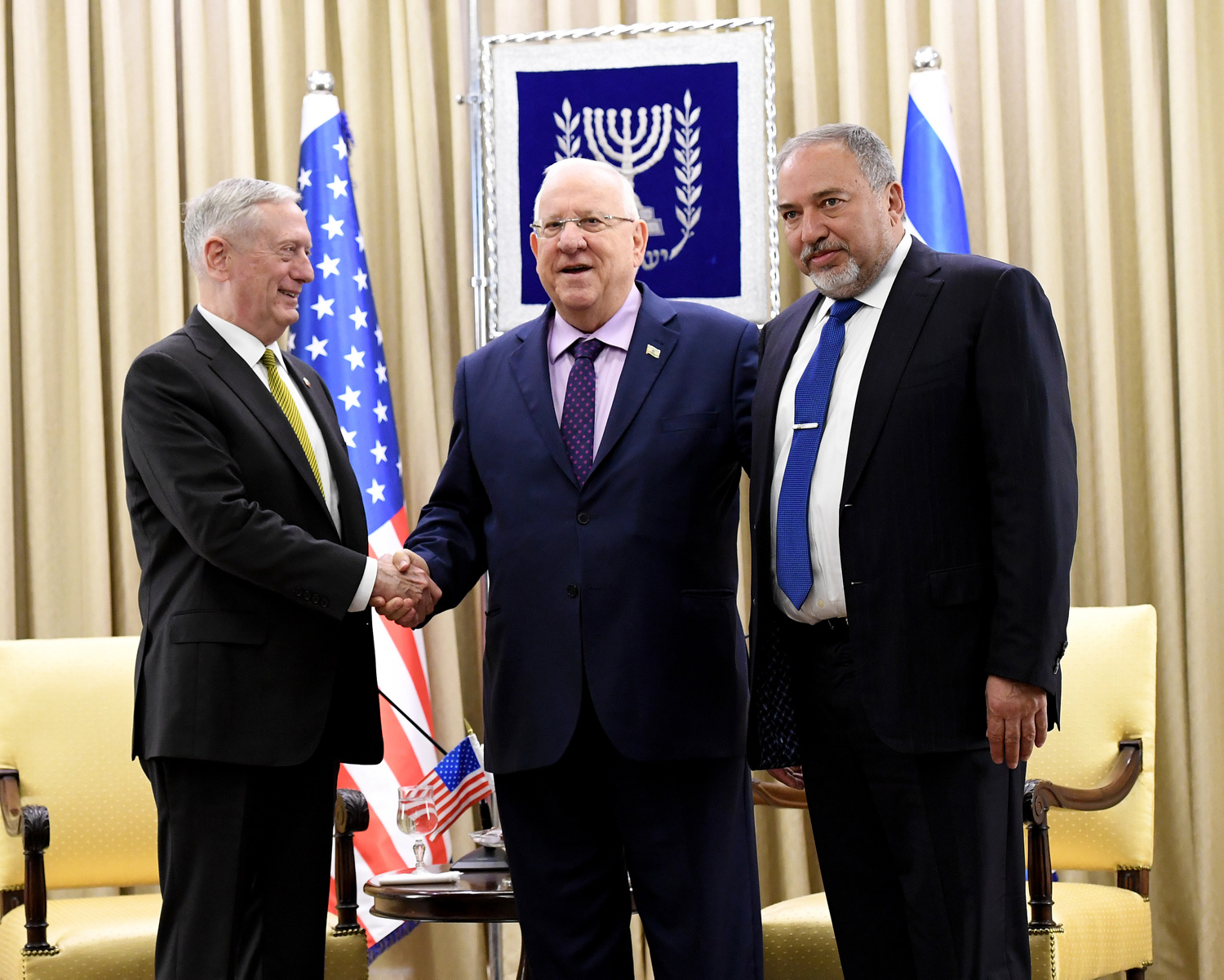
Lieberman with U.S. Secretary of Defense James Mattis and Israeli President Reuven Rivlin in April 2017

In June 2016, Lieberman was appointed Israel's Minister of Defense, as a result of his party joining the government coalition. Lieberman's first action as Defense Minister was to approve equal rights for the bereaving families of Lesbian, Gay, Bisexual, and Transgender soldiers. Avigdor Lieberman issued an official document on behalf of the Defense Ministry in June 2016 declaring that the ministry "views same-sex and heterosexual families of fallen soldiers equally, and operates in accordance with this equality so that there is no difference in recognition and rights."

It emerged in 2023 that in 2016 while Minister of Defense, Lieberman drafted a top-secret document in which he warned the Israeli government of the risk of a Hamas attack across the Israel-Gaza border, the assault of southern communities in Israel, and the taking of hostages. The document predicted that,

Hamas intends to take the conflict into Israeli territory by sending a significant number of well-trained forces (like the Nukhba [commandos] for example) into Israel to try and capture an Israeli community (or maybe even several communities) on the Gaza border and take hostages. Beyond the physical harm to the people, this will also lead to significant harm to the morale and feelings of the citizens of Israel.

The document was reportedly presented to both Prime Minister Benjamin Netanyahu and then IDF Chief of Staff Gadi Eisenkot.

In October 2018, he appointed Maj.-Gen. Aviv Kochavi, as the Chief of Staff of the Israel Defense Forces.

Lieberman resigned on 14 November 2018 in protest of the ceasefire with Hamas.

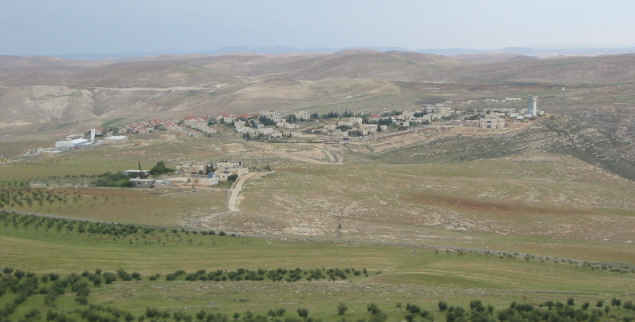
Nokdim as photographed from the air in early 2006.

=== Opposition leader ===
In June 2025, in an interview with Kan Bet public radio, Lieberman accused Netanyahu of allegedly approving weapons to an ISIS-affiliated militia in Gaza to counter Hamas. He stated in the interview,

"Israel has provided assault rifles and light weapons to crime families in Gaza, on Netanyahu's orders. The weapons are being transferred to criminals and offenders and are being directed at Israel. In my opinion, it did not pass cabinet approval. The head of the Shin Bet knows, I'm not sure the chief of staff knows. We're talking about the equivalent of Isis in Gaza."

Not long after, Netanyahu admitted that Israel is using armed gangs in Gaza to fight Hamas and the government had "activated" powerful local clans in Gaza on the advice of "security officials." According to an Israeli official, one of the groups that Netanyahu was referring to was the Popular Forces, led by Yasser Abu Shabab, a clan leader in Rafah.

He was re-elected to the Knesset in 2026 following the 2026 Israeli legislative election.

Lieberman was expected to be installed in early November as the head of the Knesset 's Foreign Affairs and Defense Committee, but the vote was delayed by Likud. He called for a new Haredi conscription law after the approval of his appointment on 16 November.

== Views and opinions ==
Lieberman believes the peace process is based on three basic assumptions which he says are false: that “Israeli-Palestinian conflict is the main cause of instability in the Middle East; that the conflict is territorial and not ideological; and that the establishment of a Palestinian state based on the 1967 borders will end the conflict."

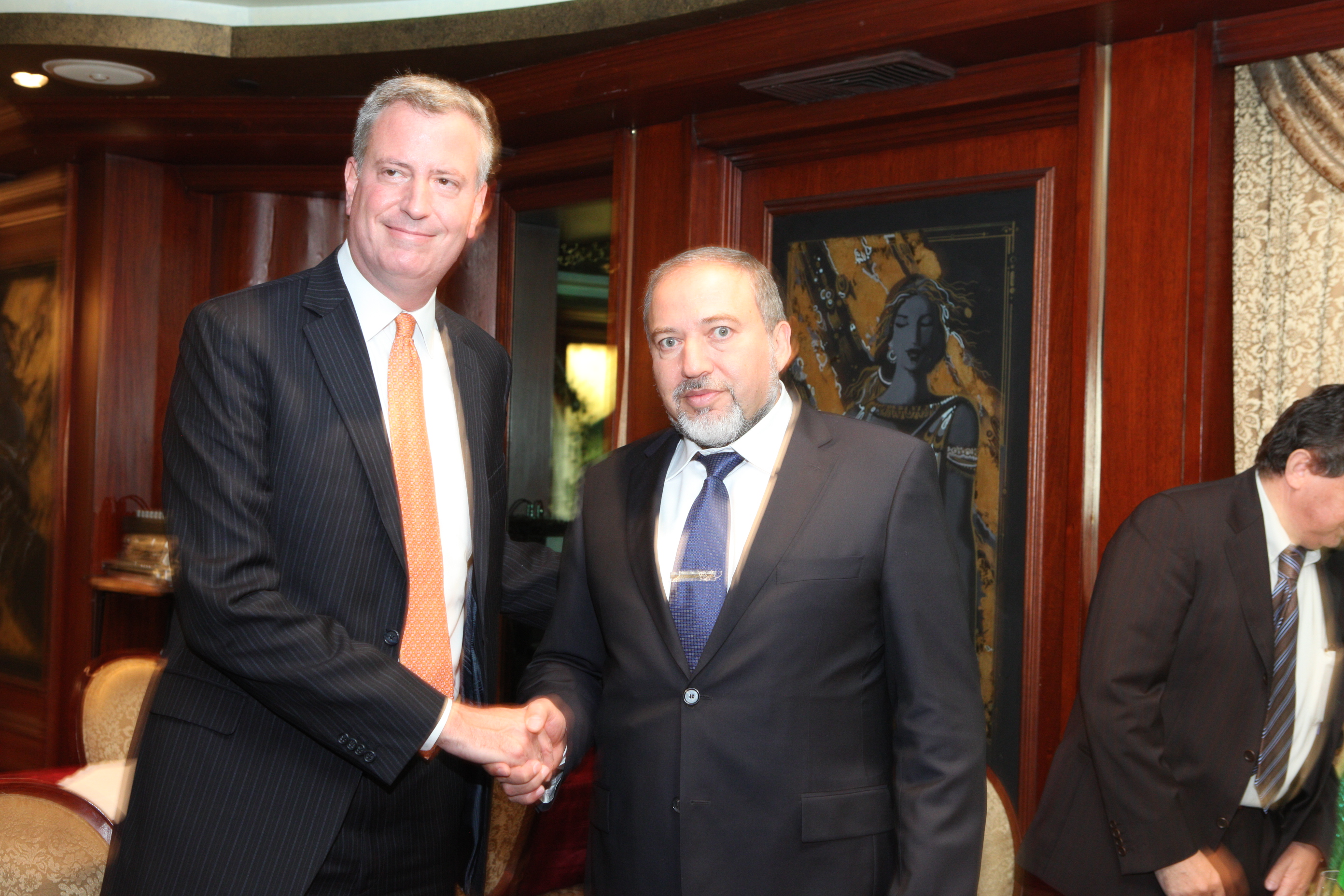
Lieberman and Bill de Blasio

In late May 2004, Lieberman unveiled the Lieberman Plan, proposing that the populations and territories of Israeli Jews and Arabs, including some Arab citizens of Israel, would be "separated". According to the plan, also known as the "Populated-Area Exchange Plan", Arab towns in Israel adjacent to Palestinian Authority areas would be transferred to Palestinian Authority, and only those Arab Israelis who migrated from the area to within Israel's new borders and pledged loyalty to Israel would be allowed to remain Israeli citizens. On 30 May 2004, Prime Minister Ariel Sharon condemned Lieberman's statements, stating "We regard Israeli Arabs as part of the State of Israel." On 4 June 2004, as the disputes over the up-coming disengagement plan grew more intense, Sharon dismissed Lieberman from the cabinet.

After the 2009 Israeli elections, Lieberman said he changed his mind in recent years and decided to support the creation of a Palestinian state. He wrote in a letter to The Jewish Week that he "advocates the creation of a viable Palestinian state", and told The Washington Post that he would agree to the evacuation of Nokdim "if there really will be a two-state solution". He stated in the Knesset that "reality changes" and that his shift had occurred over the last few years. In his Jewish Week article, Lieberman tried to explain his party's "no loyalty – no citizenship" campaign by writing: "During Operation Cast Lead in Gaza, I was appalled by the calls for the destruction of the State of Israel and for renewed suicide bombings that some Israeli Arab leaders called for at pro-Hamas rallies. Although 'responsible citizenship' had always been part of our platform, I realized that this was a burning issue that had to take top priority." He stated his "responsible citizenship" platform and compared his position to the express policy of nations around the world, saying: "In the U.S., those requesting a Green Card must take an oath that they will fulfill the rights and duties of citizenship."

On 5 January 2014, Lieberman again brought up his plan, saying that he would not support any peace plan that did not include such "an exchange". He said that when he talks about it, he refers to the Triangle and Wadi Ara.

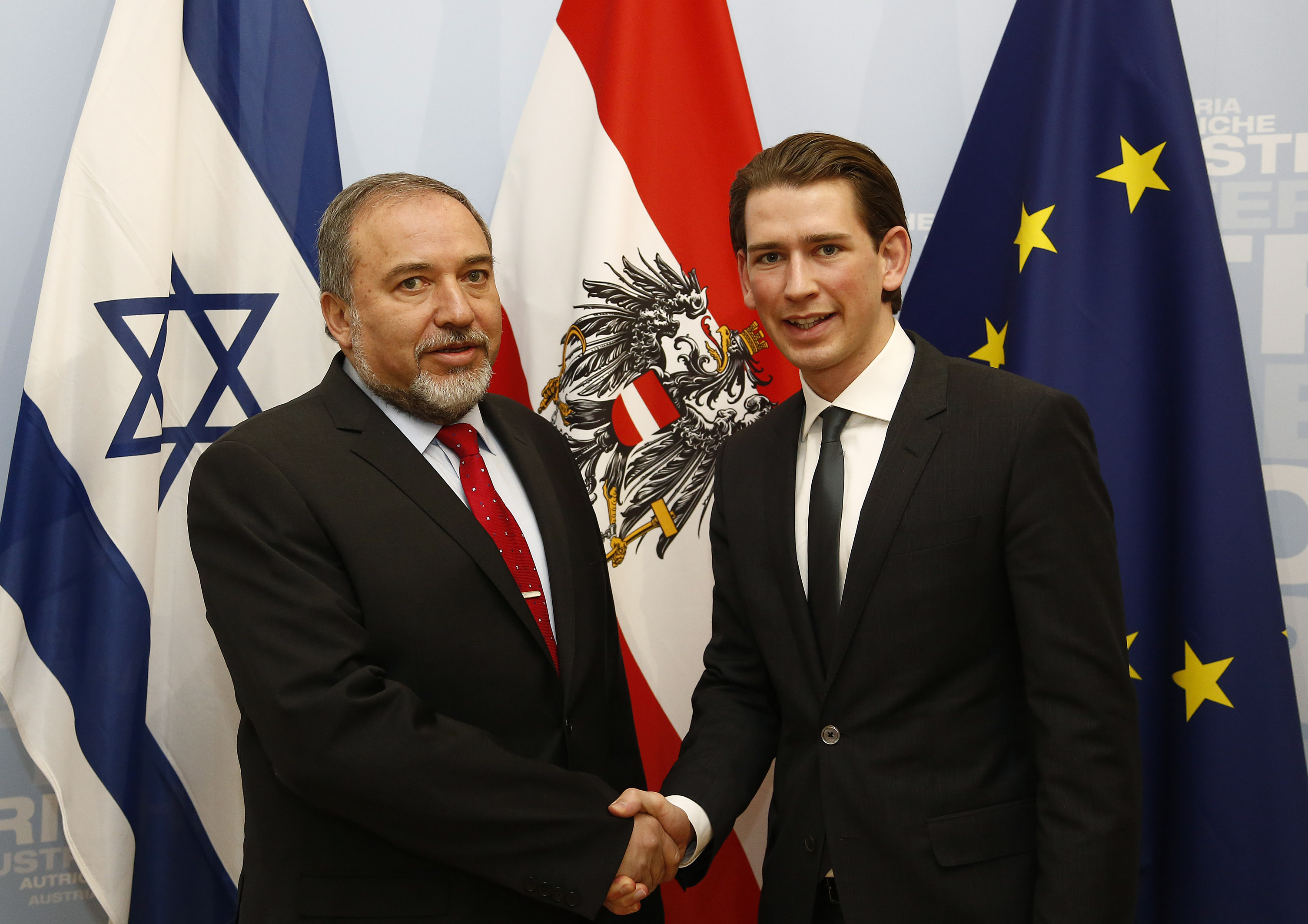
Lieberman with Austrian foreign minister Sebastian Kurz in 2014

Lieberman supports Israeli membership in the European Union and NATO. He considers Iran a serious threat to Israel, but initially came out in favor of further political/economic sanctions and opposed a military strike, saying that he cannot imagine the implications of armed action. However, Haaretz later reported that Prime Minister Benjamin Netanyahu and Defense Minister Ehud Barak persuaded Lieberman to switch sides and support an attack. In a post on X (formerly Twitter) in July 2024, Lieberman defended the use of nuclear weapons by Israel to stop the Iranian nuclear program, stating, "In order to stop the Iranian nuclear program, which is already in the weapons stages, we must use all the means at our disposal. It should be clear that at this stage it is not possible to prevent nuclear weapons from Iran by conventional means."

While his party is sometimes described by the news media as doctrinally secular and aiming to reduce the role of the rabbinical system in government, it actually supports the continuation of the role of Orthodox rabbinical courts, but wants more nationally minded religious people, rather than the ultra-orthodox, in charge. It does not advocate introducing civil marriage within Israeli law, but rather to find a solution to some of those who cannot marry under such laws. It does not advocate a separation of religion and state in Israeli society.

In response to an investigation into possible war crimes committed in the Palestinian territories launched by the International Criminal Court, Lieberman called for the court to be defunded.

Lieberman advocates expansion of foreign relations with Azerbaijan due to the historical friendliness of Azerbaijanis towards Jewish minorities. Lieberman said:

"Even in the time of the Soviet Union, (Azerbaijan) was known to treat its Jewish community well, and there is no anti-Semitism there. We must continue strengthening our relations with Azerbaijan"

Azerbaijan–Israel relations play strategically important role against a common adversary of both countries, Iran. Recently, Lieberman supported Azerbaijan during 2016 Armenian–Azerbaijani clashes over the territory of Nagorno-Karabakh.

A journalistic investigation published in April 2024 suggests Liberman's support for Azerbaijan might be influenced by his family business as it revealed how Lieberman's 2 sons have been earning lucrative commissions by serving as intermediaries in major business deals for Israeli companies in Azerbaijan and also represented the national Azerbaijani airline, controlled by the Azerbaijani government, in Israel.

== Media perception ==
In the 2000s, a large number of media sources within and outside of Israel labelled Yisrael Beiteinu and Lieberman as right wing to far right or ultra-nationalist. However, in general, Israelis are divided on how to characterize Lieberman's politics. In a 2014 poll conducted in Israel, 62% saw Lieberman as a national leader.

Yisrael Beiteinu has shown support for a two-state solution and were also noted for a secularist approach upon leading new legislation for civil marriage in Israel as well as pushing for some relaxation in the conversion process. Several commentators, however, noted that these positions do not coincide with the party's platform. These positions which are contradictory to the tradition of right wing politics in Israel had been explained by Gershom Gorenberg as that following the Six-Day War, opinions were split regarding the occupied territory, where being right-wing meant a position of holding onto the territory while being left-wing addressed a high level of willingness to give that territory away. He notes Lieberman to not be a right-winger by those terms as he's talking about giving occupied lands as well as land from sovereign Israel.

== Controversies ==
=== Statements towards Arab members of Knesset ===
A polarizing figure within Israeli politics, Lieberman is quoted as saying, "I've always been controversial because I offer new ideas. For me to be controversial, I think this is positive." Lieberman has called to establish a border between Israel and the West Bank so that Israel would include large Jewish settlement blocs and the Palestinian state would include large Arab-Israeli population centers. He proposed that Israel's citizens should sign a loyalty oath or lose their right to vote.

In November 2006, Lieberman, who described Arab members of the Knesset that meet with Hamas as "terror collaborators", called for their execution: "World War II ended with the Nuremberg Trials. The heads of the Nazi regime, along with their collaborators, were executed. I hope this will be the fate of the collaborators in [the Knesset]."

The comment was attacked as racist by Eitan Cabel, a Labor party representative, and Ahmad Tibi, leader of the Arab party Ta'al and one-time advisor to Yasser Arafat, who demanded that "a criminal investigation be initiated against Lieberman for violating the law against incitement and racism". Tibi strongly objected to Lieberman's ministerial appointment, describing him as "a racist and a fascist". Labour minister Ophir Pines-Paz, who resigned over Lieberman's appointment, echoed Tibi's remarks, saying that Lieberman was tainted "by racist declarations and declarations that harm the democratic character of Israel".

In remarks in the Knesset in March 2008, shortly after 6 March attack at Jerusalem's Mercaz HaRav yeshiva, Lieberman commented that "yesterday's attack can not be disconnected from the Arab MKs incitement, which we hear daily in the Knesset." Directing his comments at Arab MKs whose comments Lieberman describes as anti-Israel incitement, he added that "a new administration will be established and then we will take care of you."

=== Statements about Egypt ===
In 1998, news reports stated that Lieberman suggested the bombing of the Aswan Dam in retaliation for Egyptian support for Yasser Arafat. In 2001, reports stated that he told a group of ambassadors from the Former Soviet Union that if Egypt and Israel were ever to face off militarily again, that Israel could bomb the Aswan Dam.

Since the signing of the Egyptian–Israeli Peace Treaty, which followed Egyptian President Anwar Sadat's historic visit to Israel, multiple Israeli heads of state have visited Egypt on numerous occasions. However, Sadat's successor, Hosni Mubarak, visited Israel only once—for Yitzhak Rabin's funeral in 1995—and never participated in talks on Israeli soil. In 2008, while on the Knesset speaker's podium during its memorial for Rehavam Ze'evi, Lieberman raised the issue and said, "Mubarak never agreed to come here as president. He wants to talk to us? Let him come here. He doesn't want to talk to us? He can go to hell."

Prime Minister Ehud Olmert and President Shimon Peres immediately apologized to the Egyptians. Lieberman accused the two of them of acting like "a battered wife". He explained his belief that the President and Prime Minister were wrong to ask forgiveness from Mubarak in that Egypt had provoked Israel just days earlier by identifying Israel as the enemy in a massive military exercise and that caricatures in the Egyptian media are akin to Nazi propaganda.

After Netanyahu began his term as prime minister in March 2009, government aides met with Egyptian officials and told them that Lieberman's role should not be a reason for tension between the two countries. News reports had previously been issued claiming that Egypt would not work with the Netanyahu administration unless Lieberman personally apologized. The administration labeled them "inaccurate and out of all proportion". On 9 April, Mubarak invited Netanyahu to meet with him personally in Sharm e-Sheikh. Unofficial channels for discussion were also reportedly being considered.

During a meeting with Egyptian intelligence chief Omar Suleiman in April 2009, Lieberman made an attempt at an apology, expressing "his respect and appreciation for Egypt's leading role in the region and his personal respect for Egyptian President Hosni Mubarak and Minister Suleiman".

On 21 August, Lieberman said that it is important for Israel to make sure that the Egyptian-Israeli peace treaty is upheld, and not to remain silent as Egyptian military forces enter the Sinai. Concern was raised by Israeli officials over Egyptian failure to notify Israel about the deployment of tanks in the Sinai, which violates the peace treaty. Lieberman said, "We must make sure that every detail is upheld, otherwise we'll find ourselves in a slippery slope as far as the peace treaty is concerned." As instability in the Sinai continued into the next month, Lieberman responded to calls to deploy more troops with "The problem in Sinai is not the size of the forces, it is their readiness to fight, to put pressure and to carry out the job as is needed."

On 28 August, Lieberman invited Egyptian President Morsi to visit Israel, after being encouraged by Morsi'is statements in late August that the Israel-Egypt peace treaty was secure. Lieberman said, "We certainly hope to see Morsi hosting official Israeli representatives soon; we want to see him giving interviews to Israeli media; we want to see him in Jerusalem as President (Shimon) Peres' guest."

=== Statements about Palestinians ===
Following a series of terror attacks on Israeli civilians perpetrated by Palestinian militants during a three-day period in March 2002, Lieberman proposed issuing an ultimatum to the Palestinian National Authority to halt all militant activity or face wide-ranging attacks. He said, "if it were up to me I would notify the Palestinian Authority that tomorrow at ten in the morning we would bomb all their places of business in Ramallah, for example." This led then–Foreign Minister Shimon Peres to respond that excessive military measures could lead to accusations of war crimes and that the Israeli administration must not "escalate the situation".

In July 2003, reacting to a commitment made by then Prime Minister Ariel Sharon to the US, where amnesty could be given to approximately 350 Palestinian prisoners including members of Hamas and Islamic Jihad, Lieberman rejected a chance to participate in the related committee and said "It would be better to drown these prisoners in the Dead Sea if possible, since that's the lowest point in the world," Lieberman continued, according to Galei Tzahal ('Israel Army Radio'), by stating his willingness, as Minister of Transport, to supply buses to take the prisoners there. Lieberman's suggestion also led to confrontation between Lieberman and Arab-Israeli MKs Ahmed Tibi (Hadash-Ta'al), Jamal Zahalka (Balad), Taleb el-Sana, Abdelmalek Dahamsha (United Arab List) as well as then opposition leader Shimon Peres.

In January 2009, during the 2008–09 Gaza War, Lieberman argued that Israel "must continue to fight Hamas just like the United States did with the Imperial Japanese during World War II. Then, too, the occupation of the country was unnecessary." This threat has been interpreted by some media commentators, including Turkish Prime Minister Recep Tayyip Erdogan, as an allusion to Hiroshima and Nagasaki and as advocacy for a nuclear strike on Gaza.

In January 2014, according to Haaretz, Lieberman would not support any peace agreement that did not include the exchange of Israeli Arab land and population. Lieberman stated: "I will not support any peace deal that will allow the return of even one Palestinian refugee to Israel."

On 8 March 2015, he stated at a conference in Herzliya:

'Whoever is with us should get everything. Whoever is against us, there's nothing else to do. We have to lift up an axe and remove his head, otherwise we won't survive here. There is no reason that Umm al-Fahm will be part of Israel.'

This was interpreted by the Jewish Telegraphic Agency (JTA) as meaning that Israeli Arab citizens who betray or oppose the Jewish state should be beheaded. However, Lieberman supports a territorial partition of Israel, whereby Israel would cut off Arab-Israeli areas and transfer them to a future Palestinian state.

In April 2018, Lieberman said: "You have to understand, there are no innocent people in the Gaza Strip. Everyone has a connection to Hamas. Everyone receives a salary from Hamas. Those who are trying to challenge us at the border and breach it belong to Hamas's military wing." During the Gaza war, Lieberman continued to reinforce this view, stating on 30 November that "there are no innocents in Gaza."

=== Relations with Russia ===
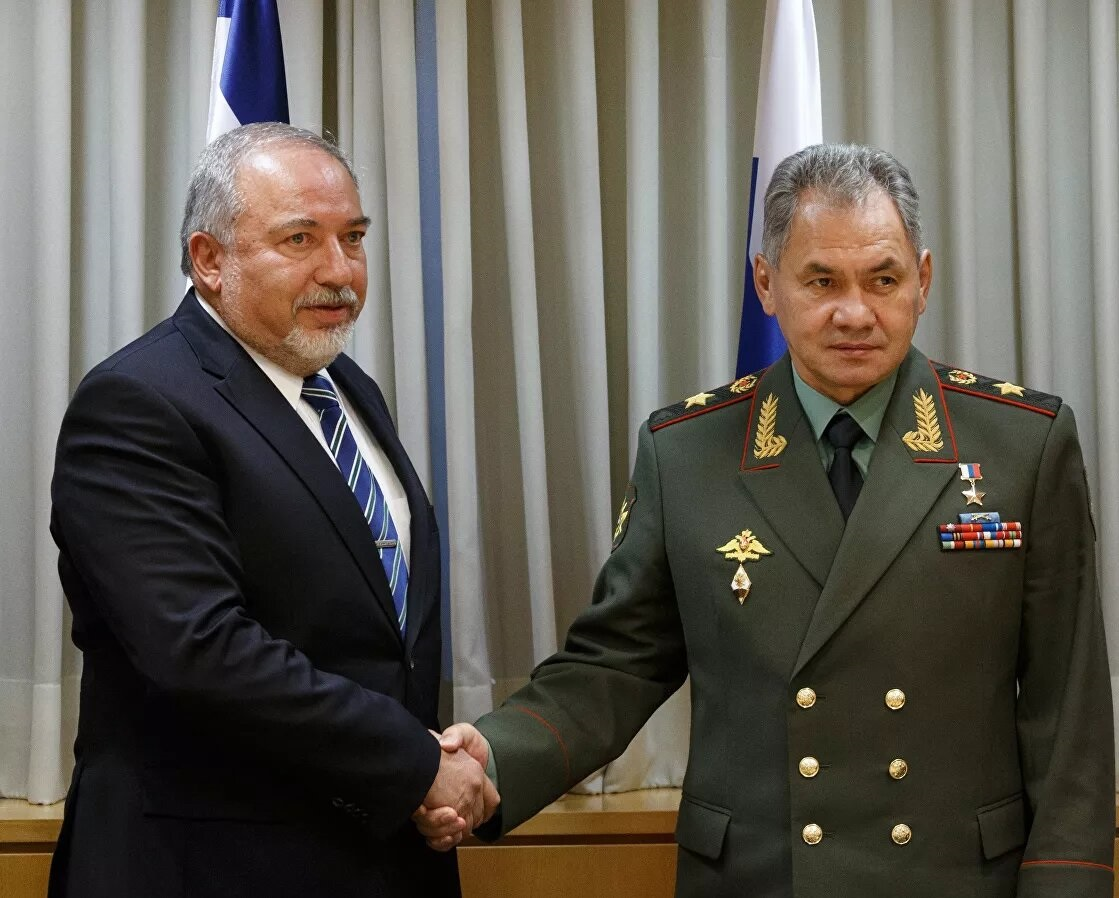
Lieberman with Russian Defense Minister Sergey Shoygu in October 2017.

After the 2011 Duma election, in which Russian President Vladimir Putin's party United Russia won, Lieberman was the first international politician to describe them as "absolutely fair, free and democratic". Putin has described Lieberman's own political career as "brilliant". Lieberman's pro-Russian stance and perceived friendly relations with Putin have also drawn criticism from other Israelis. Lieberman and his party have approved the Russian absorption of Crimea. While defense minister, he told Russian media during an interview in May 2018, that he did not agree with the West's disapproval of Russia's actions in Syria or with international sanctions against Russia.

Controversy also emerged when it was revealed that a chairman of Lieberman's party, Leon Litinetski, was also employed by the Russian government, as a chairman of the Coordinating Council of Russian Compatriots, a position appointed by the Kremlin.

== Investigations and allegations ==
=== Conviction for assault ===
On 24 September 2001, Lieberman acknowledged in the Jerusalem District Court that he hit a twelve-year-old youth from Tekoa, who had hit his son. The incident occurred in December 1999 in the Nokdim settlement. After his son was beaten by a group of children, Lieberman located one of the boys in a trailer and hit him in the face. After the boy fell and was injured, Lieberman grabbed him by the shirt-collar and arm, took him back to his home in Tekoa and threatened that he would attack him again if he returned to Nokdim.

He was charged with assaulting and threatening him. Lieberman confessed to the crime and plead guilty as part of a plea bargain. The judge ultimately ruled that Lieberman must pay the child a compensation of 10,000 shekels, and an additional fine of 7,500 shekels.

=== Corruption investigation and trial ===
Some of Lieberman's connections with local and foreign businessmen were under police investigation. Lieberman allegedly received millions of shekels from various entrepreneurs while serving as member of Knesset; under Israeli law, MKs are not allowed to receive any payment beyond their salary. One claim was that Michael Cherney paid a company called Path to the East large amounts of money between the years 1999 and 2006, and that these sums were then allegedly passed on to Lieberman as a bribe. Other allegations concern a company called M.L.1, founded by Lieberman's daughter Michal when she was 21. These allegations concern money transferred to M.L.1 from unknown sources outside Israel; the money was later allegedly used for paying salaries to Avigdor and Michal Lieberman. Lieberman was also under investigation for receiving a bribe from Austrian-Jewish businessman Martin Schlaff.

Lieberman denied all allegations of wrongdoing in these cases, and claims that the police are conspiring against him. In particular, he has pointed to the proximity of his investigation to the 2009 Israeli elections and said that such investigations are "part of my routine before every parliamentary election." Allegations of bias on the part of the police have also been reported in Arutz Sheva, which reported that the investigation, which had been "ongoing for years, suddenly became active again once [Lieberman] left the government" in January 2008.

On 2 April 2009, Lieberman was questioned by police on suspicion of corruption for at least seven hours at the national squad headquarters in central Israel. It was part of an ongoing investigation examining his business dealings. Lieberman denied all allegations. He claimed the investigation has been dragged out, and had filed a petition to the court requesting a speedy process.

On 24 May 2010 the Israel Police recommended Lieberman's indictment for breach of trust, regarding the suspected receipt of classified information concerning ongoing criminal investigations into his activities. Former ambassador to Belarus, Ze'ev Ben Aryeh was also recommended for indictment. On 13 April 2011, the State Prosecutor's Office announced that it had decided to charge Lieberman with fraud, money laundering, breach of trust and witness tampering. The pre-indictment hearing was set for 17–18 January 2012. On 13 December 2012, a CNN breaking news blog post stated that the Israeli Justice Ministry had decided to only charge him with breach of trust and fraud, and not the more serious witness tampering and money laundering corruption charges. on 14 December 2012, Lieberman announced that he was removing his immunity and resigned as foreign minister.

Lieberman's trial before the Jerusalem Magistrate's Court began on 17 February 2013 and ended on 6 November 2013 with an acquittal. The three judges voted unanimously to acquit him. In the verdict, they wrote that while Lieberman had acted improperly in failing to inform the Foreign Ministry of his past dealings with Ben Aryeh, he was not guilty of criminal activity, as he had not been aware of the seriousness of the circumstances, and his appointment of Ben Aryeh had not been a promotion. Lieberman returned to his position as foreign minister on 11 November 2013, after the Israeli cabinet had approved his re-appointment to the office the previous day.
