= Day of Prayer for the Peace of Jerusalem =

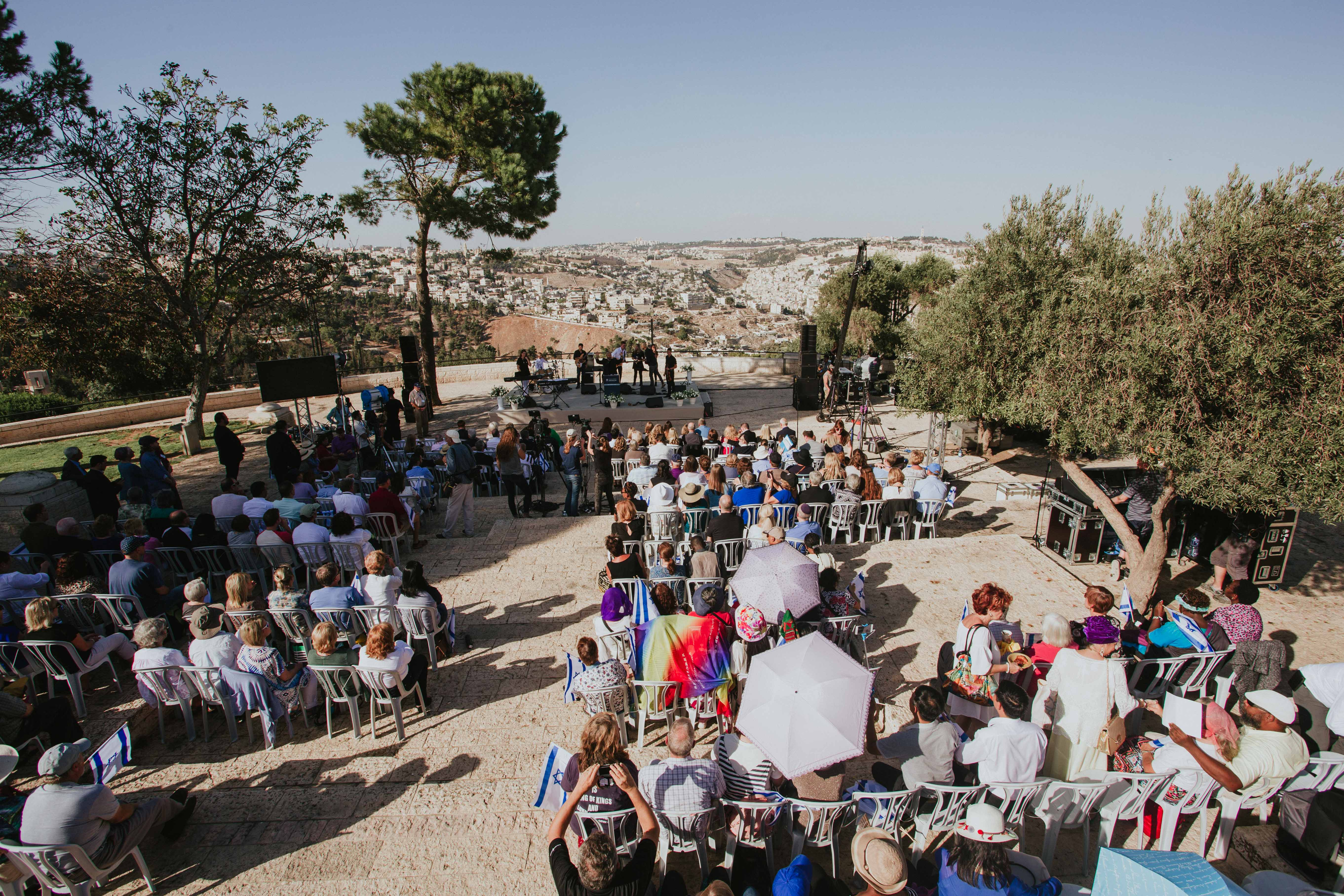
People praying for the peace of Jerusalem

The Day of Prayer for the Peace of Jerusalem is a prayer meeting organized by Pentecostal evangelists Jack W. Hayford and Robert Stearns through their organization Eagle's Wings Ministries. They annually invite people around the world to pray for Jerusalem on the first Sunday of every October, close to the time of Yom Kippur. The first prayer meeting organized by this group occurred in 2004.

Hayford and Stearns organize the primary meeting in Israel. According to a CBN interview with Stearns, he believes that prayer meetings are important to combat various dangers to the Judeo-Christian worldview, such as secular humanism and Radical Islam, and he believes that Christians are especially obligated to support the State of Israel.

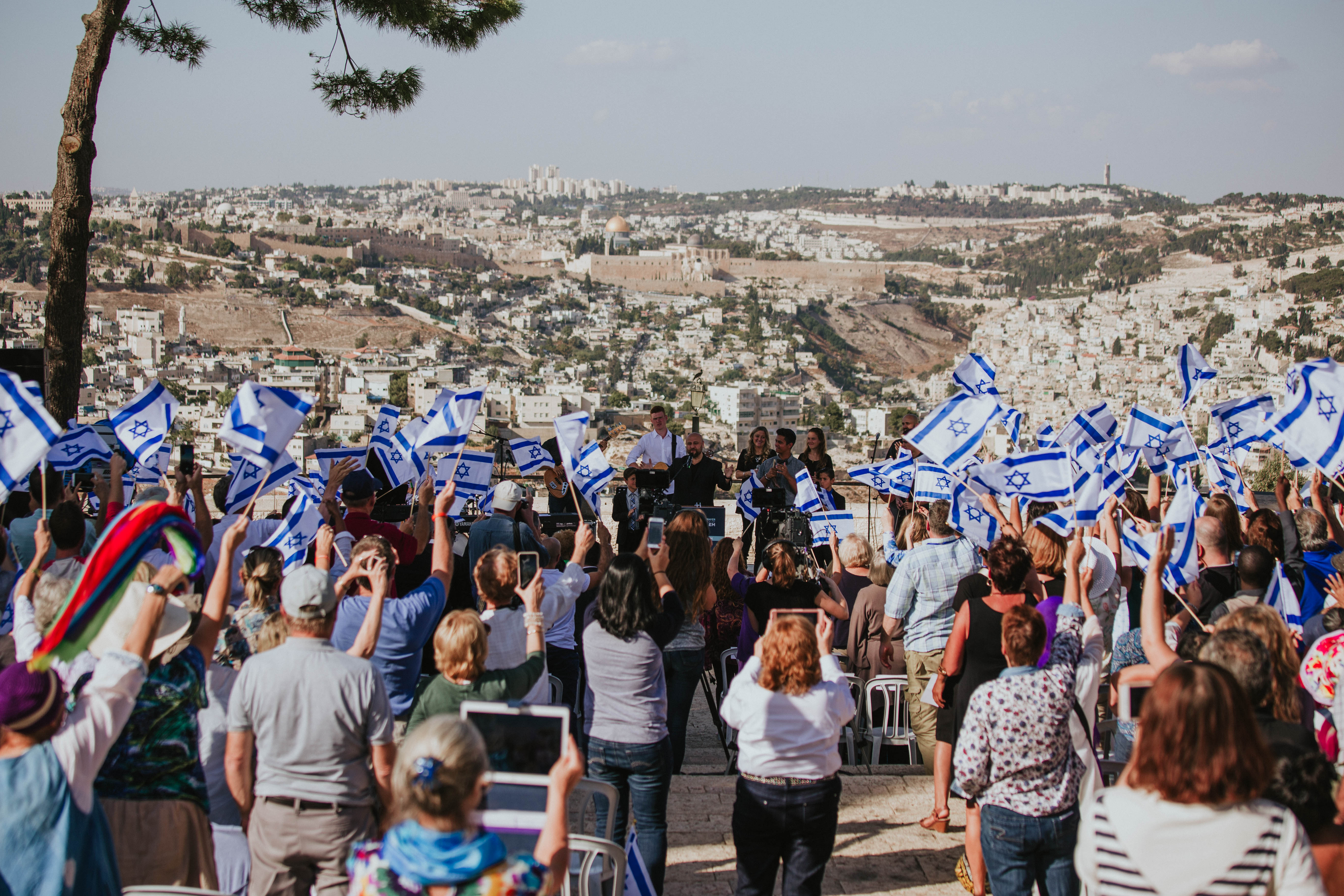
People praying for the peace of Jerusalem

== International participation ==
According to "Jerusalem Newswire" a small independent Christian publication, organizers of the 2006 event claimed that they had scheduled prayer meetings to be held in 150,000 churches around the world. The coordinators scheduled for prayer meetings to be organized in 169 nations.

In 2004, 500 global Christian ministries representing 50 countries and 53,000 churches said prayers for peace in Jerusalem on the same day. The organization's goal in 2006 was to have over 100 million people in over 100 countries participate in prayer meetings. The prayer meeting in Jerusalem in 2006 was held inside the gates of the Old City of Jerusalem and was attended by "hundreds of Christian lovers of Israel gathered with Jewish friends."

International denominations Assemblies of God, and Elim Fellowship took part in the 2006 prayer and support the annual prayers.

== Endorsements ==
According to a press release issued by the Knesset Christian Allies Caucus, the Day of Prayer for the Peace of Jerusalem was originally established in cooperation with Israel's Ministry of Tourism, and the Christian Allies Caucus of the Knesset.

The event is endorsed by chief rabbi Yona Metzger, former USSR Prisoner of Zion and Knesset Member Natan Sharansky, chairman of the Knesset Christian Allies Caucus (KCAC), Yuri Shtern, and the Deputy Mayor of Jerusalem, Yigal Amedi and the Knesset Christian Allies Caucus. Other participants are Christian evangelists, authors and performers such as Joyce Meyer, The Newsboys , Bishop TD Jakes, Michael W. Smith, and Kenneth Copeland.

== Precursor ==
The first globally publicized "link of prayer" for peace from Jerusalem was the "World Prayer for Peace from Jerusalem" in June, 1993 organized by Dan Mazar's Jerusalem Christian Review, a Jerusalem-based archaeological journal. As opposed to the more exclusively Evangelical Christian event, this event included more than 100 Christian and political leaders from a wide range of backgrounds and from around the world.

Hosted by Jerusalem Christian Review Managing Editor Dan Mazar, parts of the Global Prayer were also shown on the CNN, CBS, and ABC television networks and almost 120 other television stations worldwide. The Prayer Link began from Los Angeles, California with a prayer from the former US President, Ronald Reagan: "I join my friends at the Jerusalem Christian Review... for this very special day. A day dedicated to prayer..." said the former US president and governor of the State of California. The "prayer link" also included prayers of political figures live by satellite from 5 continents. Leaders such as Jack Kemp, Jeane Kirkpatrick and numerous US Senators, as well as former Australian Prime Minister Bob Hawke all prayed for the "Peace of Jerusalem". Also included were Christian evangelists Billy Graham, Pat Robertson, Jerry Falwell and James Dobson, along with denominational leaders from Europe, Africa, South America and Asia.

== See also ==
- Day of Prayer
- Reunification of Jerusalem
