= Alexander Tzinker =

Israeli politician

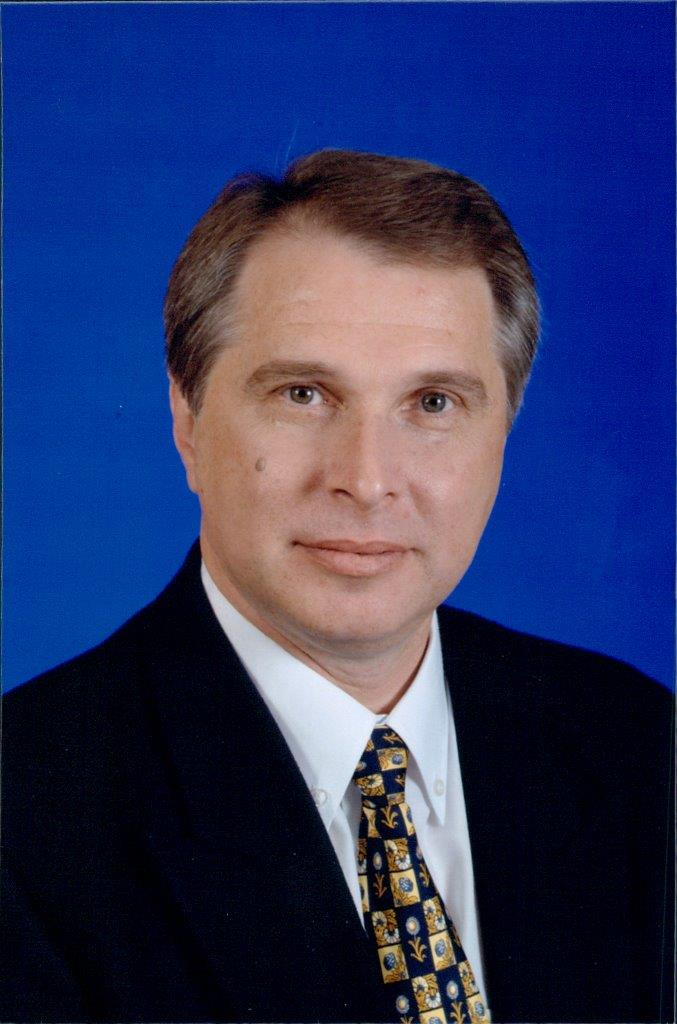

Faction represented in the Knesset
- 1999: Yisrael BaAliyah
- 1999–2003: Democratic Choice

Personal details
- Born: 2 January 1953 (age 72) Soviet Union

Dr Alexander "Sasha" Tzinker (Hebrew: אלכסנדר צינקר; born 2 January 1953) is an Israeli former politician who served as a member of the Knesset for Yisrael BaAliyah and the Democratic Choice between 1999 and 2003.

== Biography ==
Born in the Ukrainian SSR in the Soviet Union, Tzinker gained an MA at the Polytechnic Institute in Armenia in 1975 and a PhD from the Moscow Scientific Center for Management in 1988. He worked as a systems analyst and emigrated to Israel in 1990.

For the 1999 elections he was placed sixth on the Yisrael BaAliyah list, and entered the Knesset as the party won six seats. On 20 July 1999, just over a month after the elections, Tzinker and Roman Bronfman left the party to establish a new Knesset faction; six days later it was renamed "Mahar" (a Hebrew acronym for Party for Society and Reforms), and in October adopted the name "Democratic Choice".

Prior to the 2003 elections Tzinker left the Democratic Choice (which was to be allied to Meretz) and established a new party, Citizen and State, which he headed. However, the party received only 1,566 votes (0.05%), well below the 1.5% election threshold, and Tzinker lost his seat.

In the run-up to the 2006 elections, Citizen and State was taken over by former Shinui MKs, led by Avraham Poraz, and renamed Hetz.
