= Josh Reinstein =

American zionist activist

Josh Reinstein is the Director of the Knesset Christian Allies Caucus and President of the Israel Allies Foundation, a nongovernmental, not for profit organization formed in January 2004 by Yuri Stern to encourage faith-based support for Israel among elected members of legislatures and parliaments worldwide, with an emphasis on faith-based, Christian support of Israel.

== Biography ==
Joshua (Josh) Reinstein was born in Toronto, Canada, but grew up in Dallas. His father was the president of the local chapter of the Zionist Organization of America. Reinstein graduated from the University of Western Ontario in Canada with a degree in political science and immigrated to Israel in 1999.

He was English-language spokesman for the Israeli National Union Party before becoming Director of the Knesset Christian Allies Caucus.

In 2008 Reinstein stood for election to the Knesset on The Jewish Home Party list.

== Career ==
In 2004 Reinstein assisted MK Yuri Stern to form the Israel Allies Caucus. In 2005 Reinstein worked with MK Stern and MK Benny Elon to approach American pastor John Hagee and encourage him to create and lead Christians United for Israel.

Reinstein heads the Israel Allies Foundation, which coordinates the efforts of 44 Israel Allies Caucuses in parliaments around the world. Reinstein has been involved with developing improved cooperation between Jewish and Christian Israelis who seek the support of Christian in other countries to support Israel.

Reinstein is owner and operator of JSR International Marketing, an international marketing and public relations firm based in Israel. Reinstein was the founder and founding producer of Israel Now News, a half-hour weekly TV show broadcast on the Daystar network. The program provides substantial airtime to pro-Israel Christian organizations such as the International Christian Embassy Jerusalem.

== Publications ==
He is the author of the 2020 book Titus, Trump and the Triumph of Israel: The Power of Faith-Based Diplomacy.

== Awards and recognition ==
In 2012, Reinstein was number 49 on the Jerusalem Post's list of the "50 most influential Jews in the world." The citation described him as "the father of faith-based diplomacy."

== See also ==
- Israel Allies Foundation
