= Robert Stearns =

Robert Stearns may refer to:

- Robert Stearns (pastor), American pastor and evangelical Christian leader
- Robert B. Stearns (1888–1954), American financier
- Robert E. C. Stearns (1827–1909), American conchologist
