= List of ambassadors of Israel to Belarus =

== List of ambassadors ==
- Alon Shoham 2017 -
- Yossef Shagal 2012 - 2015
- Edward Shapira 2009 - 2011
- Zeev Ben-Arie 2004 - 2009
- Martin Peled-Flax 1998 - 2002
- Zeev Ben-Arie 1997 chargé d'affaires
