= Marina Solodkin =

Israeli politician (1952–2013)

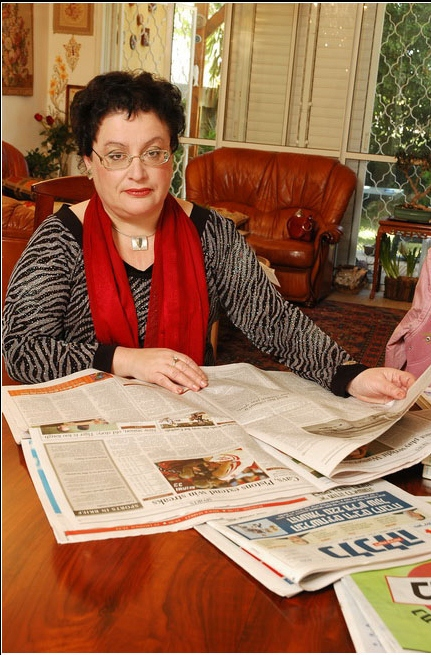

Faction represented in the Knesset
- 1996–2003: Yisrael BaAliyah
- 2003–2005: Likud
- 2005–2013: Kadima

Personal details
- Born: 31 May 1952 Moscow, Soviet Union
- Died: 16 March 2013 (aged 60) Riga, Latvia

Marina Solodkin (Hebrew: מרינה סולודקין, 31 May 1952 – 16 March 2013) was an Israeli politician and member of the Knesset for Yisrael BaAliyah, Likud and Kadima.

She emigrated to Israel from Russia in the early 1990s and joined the immigrant Yisrael BaAliyah party and entered the Knesset in 1996. She served as a lawmaker until February 2013 when she lost her seat in the elections.

== Biography ==
Marina Gershman (later Solodkin) was born in Moscow in the Soviet Union. Solodkin studied at Moscow State University, where she gained a PhD in economic and social science. She immigrated to Israel in 1991. Solodkin died of a stroke in a hotel room in Latvia on 16 March 2013. She wrote on her Facebook page the Friday before: "In a few hours' time I will take off for Latvia in order to take part in a conference I was invited to by the Latvian Committee against Fascism… Lately, Neo-Nazism is raising its ugly head in Eastern Europe, in the post-Soviet states. We must remain vigilant."

She was survived by her husband and two children. She lived in Ashkelon.

== Political career ==
In Israel, Solodkin joined the Russian-immigrant party, Yisrael BaAliyah led by Soviet dissident Natan Sharansky. She was elected to the Knesset in the 1996 elections on the party's list and chaired the committee on the Status of Women. After retaining her seat in the 1999 elections, she was appointed Deputy Minister of Immigrant Absorption, a post she regained during the 16th Knesset after Yisrael BaAliyah had merged into Likud.

Shortly before the 2006 elections Solodkin resigned from the Knesset in order to join Kadima. She gained 6th place on the party's list and was re-elected. However, in protest at not being appointed a Minister despite her high position on Kadima's list, she was absent from the swearing-in ceremony of the new government. Her absence from the cabinet was unpopular with many Russian immigrants.

She called for foreign agricultural workers to be replaced with Ethiopian immigrants, and demanded that Ariel Toaff be put on trial for his book about blood libel. She has also said that Ehud Olmert should resign over the 2006 Lebanon War.

She retained her seat in the 2009 elections after being placed tenth on the party's list. On 5 December 2012, in the days leading up to the 2013 elections, while polls showed Kadima either barely getting into the Knesset or not even passing the threshold, Solodkin announced she would not contest the elections.

In 2010 she supported calls to ban the Burka in Israel.

== Literary career ==
- Dictionary of Economic History (in Russian, 1995)
- Civilization Discomfort: Soviet Jewry in Israel in the 90's (in Russian, 1996)
- Not another Generation of the Wilderness (in Hebrew)
