= Yisrael HaMithadeshet =

Aliyah Yisrael HaMithadeshet עליה ישראל המתחדשת
- Leader: Michael Nudelman; Yuri Stern
- Founded: 1999
- Dissolved: 2009
- Split from: Yisrael BaAliyah
- Political position: Centre-right
- Most MKs: 2 (1999)

Election symbol
- נ

Yisrael HaMithadeshet (Hebrew: ישראל המתחדשת, lit. Renewed Israel), formerly known as Aliyah (עלי"ה, lit. Immigration but also an acronym for Amenu LiMa'an Yisrael HaMithadeshet (עמנו למען ישראל המתחדשת, lit. We People For a Renewed Israel)) is a political party in Israel.

== Background ==
The party was formed on 23 February 1999 during the 14th Knesset when MKs Michael Nudelman and Yuri Stern, both immigrants from Russia, broke away from Natan Sharansky's Yisrael BaAliyah. Splits had appeared when the party decided to vote against an amendment to the Religious Services Law that blocked Reform and Conservative Jews from Religious Councils, but Nudelman and Stern did not turn up to vote.

After the split, Nudelman initially suggested the party be named Shiluv (Hebrew: שילוב, lit. Integration), but instead Aliyah was chosen. For the 1999 elections the party ran as part of Avigdor Lieberman's Yisrael Beiteinu list, with both Nudelman and Stern retaining their seats.

Aliyah was still in existence as a faction within Yisrael Beiteinu in 2005. In that year Nudelman filed a lawsuit against Yisrael Beiteinu for using five million shekels of funds belonging to Aliyah for municipal election campaigns. Stern remained an MK for the party until his death in 2007; Nudelman defected to Kadima during the 16th Knesset after serving as an independent.

Renamed Yisrael Mithadeshet, the party ran as an independent entity in the 2009 elections with Nudelman as its head, but failed to win any seats.
