= Martin Peled-Flax =

Israeli diplomat

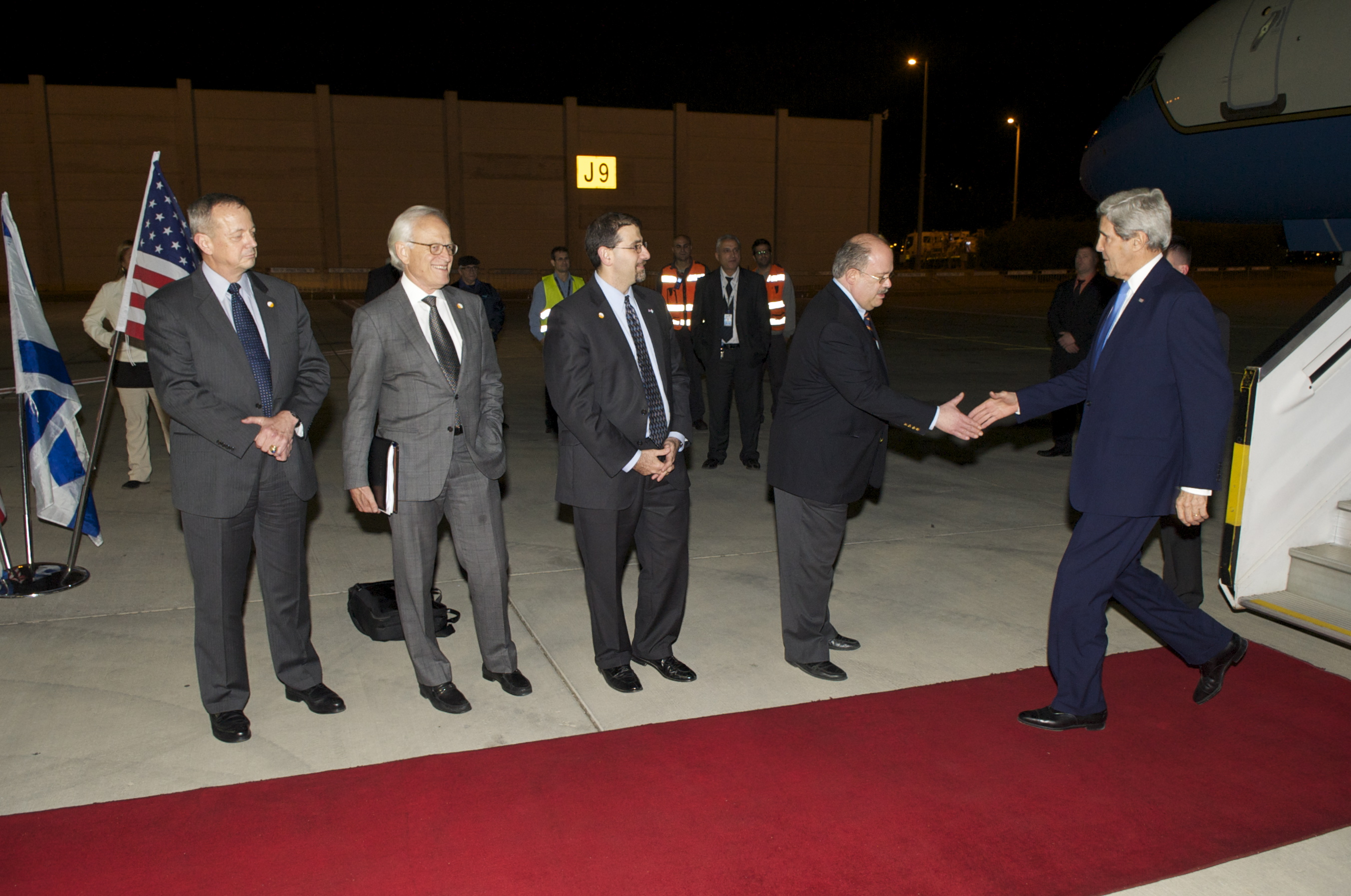
U.S. Secretary of State John Kerry is greeted by Martin Peled-Flax of the Israeli Ministry of Foreign Affairs as he arrives at Ben Gurion International Airport in Tel Aviv on December 4, 2013.

Martin Peled-Flax (Hebrew: מרטין פלד-פשתן; born July 18, 1958, New York) is an Israeli diplomat who has been Ambassador to Belarus (1998–2002), first as Charge d'Affaires a.i. and then as Ambassador Extraordinary and Plenipotentiary. From 1992 until 1994, he was the Israeli consul in Houston, Texas.

In 2015, he was appointed Minister for Congressional Affairs at the Israeli Embassy in Washington, D.C.

== Education ==
- 1974–1978 — Touro College (B.A.)
- 1978–1982 — Jewish Theological Seminary of America (M.A. and Rabbinic Ordination)
