= Democratic Choice (Israel) =

Democratic Choice בחירה דמוקרטית
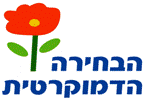
- Russian name: ДемВыбор
- Leader: 1999-2006; Roman Bronfman; 2020; Yair Golan
- Founded: 20 July 1999
- Dissolved: 2006 (de facto)
- Split from: Yisrael BaAliyah
- Ideology: Social democracy Anti-clericalism; Labor Zionism; Russian speakers' interests
- Political position: Left-wing
- Alliance: Meretz (2003–2006); Democratic Union (2020)
- Most MKs: 2 (1999-2003)
- Fewest MKs: 1 (2003-2006)

The Democratic Choice (Hebrew: בחירה דמוקרטית, Bekhira Demokratit) was a political party in Israel. Between 1999 and 2006, it was the name of a faction led by Roman Bronfman, which was associated with Meretz. In 2020 the party was revived for five days by Yair Golan.

== History ==
=== Bronfman era (1999–2006) ===
The party was formed in July 1999 during the 15th Knesset when Roman Bronfman and Alexander Tzinker broke away from Yisrael BaAliyah. At first, the party had no name, and was recorded as the Parliamentary Group of Bronfman and Tzinker in the Knesset, but after six days a name was approved by the Knesset committee: Mahar (Hebrew: מח"ר), literally Tomorrow, but also an acronym for Mifleget Hevra veReformot (Hebrew: מפלגת חברה ורפורמות, lit. Party for Society and Reforms). Three months later the party's name was changed, this time settling upon Democratic Choice.

On 24 November 2002, in the run-up to the 2003 elections, Bronfman decided to run as part of a joint list with Meretz and Yossi Beilin's Shahar Movement, with the Democratic Choice guaranteed fifth place on the party's list. However, Tzinker, who did not share Bronfman's social-democratic ideology, quit the faction and founded an independent party, Citizen and State. Although Meretz received criticism for its decision to unite with Bronfman given his support for Jörg Haider's far-right Freedom Party, the merger was reported to have given Meretz almost enough votes from new immigrants for an extra two seats. In the elections the joint list won six seats, with Bronfman retaining his place in the Knesset. Tzinker's party won just 1,566 votes, well below the 44,750 vote qualifying threshold. The Democratic Choice also won seats on municipal councils, including that of Haifa.

When Meretz and Shahar decided to unite into one party, Meretz-Yachad, in 2004 during the 16th Knesset, the Democratic Choice chose not to join, though it did remain as part of a united faction with the new party.

Prior to the 2006 elections Bronfman announced that the party would run independently on the basis that the alliance with Meretz was costing him votes in the Russian sector. In January 2006 Bronfman held discussions with Avraham Poraz about a mass defection of Shinui MKs (who were unhappy with the surprising results of the party's primary elections) to the Democratic Choice. However, the talks came to nothing and Poraz ended up founding Hetz. Two months before the elections the party withdrew its candidacy, with Bronfman deciding not to run in the election.

=== Golan era (2020) ===
The party subsequently became defunct, before being revived by Yair Golan in the build-up to the 2020 elections.

On 7 January, the Democratic Choice agreed to contest the elections on a joint list with Meretz, called the Democratic Union. On 14 January, Meretz agreed to run on a joint list with Labor and Gesher, with Golan joining Meretz.

== Election results ==
Election	Leader	Votes	%	Seats	+/–	Government
2003	Roman Bronfman	With Meretz		1 / 120	New	Coalition
2006	Did not contest					Extraparliamentary
2009	Did not contest					Extraparliamentary
2013	Did not contest					Extraparliamentary
2015	Did not contest					Extraparliamentary
Apr 2019	Did not contest					Extraparliamentary
Sep 2019	Yair Golan	Part of Democratic Union		1 / 120	▲1	Snap election
