= Ze'ev Ben Aryeh =

Israeli diplomat

- Born: Vladimir Flanchik; October 30, 1945 (age 81); Kharkiv, Soviet Union (now Ukraine)
- Occupation: Diplomat
- Known for: Former Israeli ambassador to Belarus, involved in a breach of trust case
- Spouse: Olga Ben Aryeh
- Children: George Ben Aryeh; Elena Ben Aryeh

Ze'ev Ben Aryeh (born Vladimir Flanchik, Russian: Владимир Леонидович Фланчик, Ukrainian: Володимир Фланчик, on October 30, 1945) is an Israeli diplomat and the former Israeli ambassador to Belarus, who pleaded guilty to illegally tipping off his long-term friend Foreign Minister Avigdor Lieberman to a criminal investigation being conducted into his affairs.

== Career ==
Ze'ev Ben-Aryeh was born in Kharkiv, Soviet Union (now Ukraine). In 1971, after graduating from the University of Kharkiv, he immigrated to Israel. In 1972, he began working for Kol Israel and for many years was director of its Russian-language news department. He also sat on the editorial board of the Russian-language newspaper "Vremia" in the 1990s. In 1993, he joined the Israeli Foreign Service.

He has worked at Israeli embassies in Moscow, Minsk, and Kyiv, and from 1997 to 1998, was chargé d'affaires at the Israeli embassy in Minsk. In 2004, he was appointed ambassador to Belarus. Lieberman had allegedly lobbied for him to be appointed ambassador.

== Breach of trust trial ==
Ben Aryeh was accused of illegally passed Lieberman documents regarding a criminal investigation into his alleged acceptance of bribes. He caught wind of the investigation when he was given a package of documents with details of the investigation and a request for assistance from Belarusian authorities, and was told to give the package to Belarusian Police. According to the indictment, he shared the package with Lieberman. On April 3, 2010, Ben-Aryeh was forced to resign from the Foreign Ministry.

On May 24, 2010, the Israel Police recommended Ben Aryeh and Lieberman be indicted on the charge of breach of trust; it was also recommended that Ben Aryeh be charged with obstruction of justice. The case was especially noteworthy because of Lieberman's role as the leader of Yisrael Beiteinu, the third largest party (by voting share in Israel), a fact which left Lieberman Deputy Israeli Prime-Minister.

In June 2012, Ben-Aryeh pleaded guilty to disclosure in breach of duty and obstruction of justice as part of a plea bargain, and received a sentence of four months' community service. Lieberman went to trial and was found not guilty.

== Personal life ==
Ben-Aryeh is married to Olga, and has two children: a son, George, and a daughter, Elena. He lives in Lotem.
