= Yosef Shagal =

USSR-born Israeli politician (born 1949)

- יוסף שגל
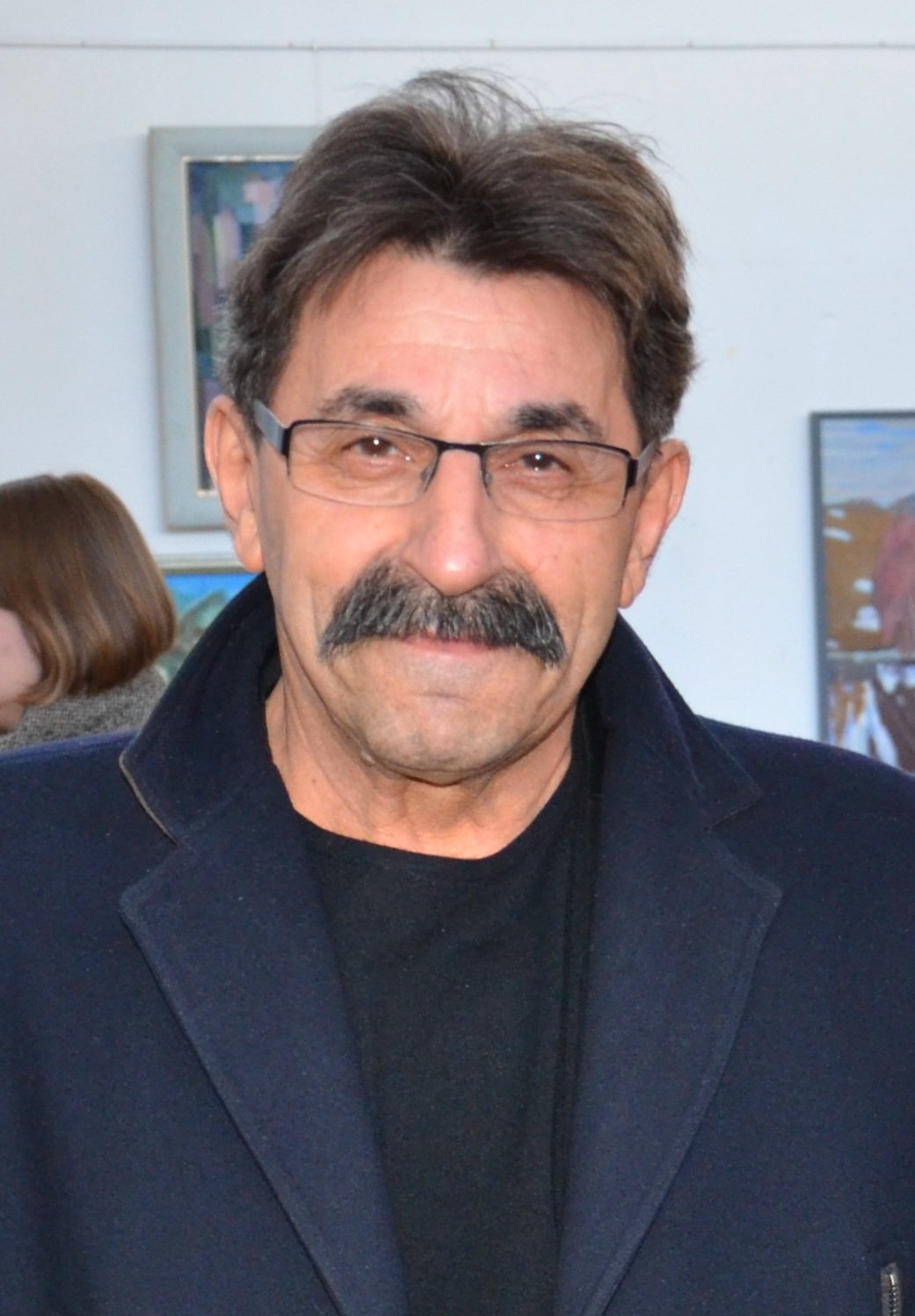

Ambassadors of Israel to Belarus
- In office 2012–2015

Faction represented in the Knesset
- 2006–2009: Yisrael Beiteinu

Personal details
- Born: 25 March 1949 (age 76) Baku, Soviet Union

Yosef Shagal (Hebrew: יוסף שגל; born 25 March 1949) is an Israeli politician and former journalist, of Azerbaijani Jewish origin. He served as a member of the Knesset for the Russian-immigrant dominated Yisrael Beiteinu between 2006 and 2009. From 2012 until 2015, he was the ambassador of Israel to Belarus.

== Background ==
Born in Baku in the Soviet Union (today in Azerbaijan) of Mountain Jewish heritage, Shagal studied history at university. After gaining a BA, he began working as a journalist. He made aliyah to Israel in 1990, and worked as a reporter for Israel Plus, the country's Russian language station.

Shagal joined Yisrael Beiteinu, a nationalist party dominated by immigrants from the Former Soviet Union in February 2006, just a month before the 2006 elections. Despite his late entry to politics, he won fourth spot on the party's list, and was elected to the Knesset when it won eleven seats. He lost his seat in the 2009 elections. Today he lives in Jerusalem and is married with two children.

In 2008, Yosef Shagal, then retired Israeli parliamentarian, in an interview to Azerbaijani media stated: "I find it deeply offensive, and even blasphemous to compare the Holocaust of European Jewry during the Second World War with the mass extermination of the Armenian people during the First World War. Jews were killed because they were Jews, but Armenians provoked Turkey and should blame themselves."
