= Lev Lieberman =

Moldovan writer and Zionist activist (1921–2007)

- Лев Янкелевич Либерман
- Born: May 18, 1921; Orhei, Orhei County, Kingdom of Romania (now in Moldova)
- Died: July 2, 2007 (aged 86); Israel
- Spouse: Esther Markovna Lieberman (m. 1953)
- Children: Avigdor Lieberman
- Writing career
- Language: Russian

Lev Yankelevich Lieberman (Лев Янкелевич Либерман; Hebrew: לב / לייב ליברמן; 18 May 1921 – 2 July 2007) was a Soviet Moldovan writer, soldier and Zionist activist.

A native Yiddish speaker, he was a member of the Romanian branch of Beitar during his teenage years. After the Soviet occupation of Bessarabia and Northern Bukovina, he served in the Red Army during the Second World War, where he survived Nazi captivity by adopting the identity of a deceased Slavic soldier. Following the war, he was subjected to internal exile in Siberia by Soviet authorities. After his release, he became a Russian-language writer in the Moldavian SSR, before emigrating to Israel. He was the father of Israeli politician and former minister Avigdor Lieberman.

== Early life and education ==
Lieberman was born into a Jewish family in Orhei, then part of Bessarabia in the Kingdom of Romania (now in the Moldova). During his childhood and adolescence, his family relocated to Bucharest, where he spent much of his youth. In 1940, following the Soviet annexation of Bessarabia, due to the political rise of Ion Antonescu, the family returned to Orhei.

During his years in Bucharest, Lieberman was active in the Zionist youth organization Betar (Beitar), aligned with the Revisionist Zionism of Ze'ev Jabotinsky. He studied Hebrew and was influenced by Jabotinsky's political and cultural philosophy. Lieberman attended a Romanian high school in Bucharest, where he acquired fluency in German alongside his native Yiddish and Romanian. He did not pursue higher education, receiving a pre-university education rooted in the Romanian Jewish community.

== World War II and captivity ==
Following the launch of Operation Barbarossa in June 1941, Lieberman voluntarily enlisted in the Red Army. His brother, Velvl (Volf) Lieberman, also served in the military and later died of wounds sustained during the Battle of Stalingrad.

In the summer of 1942, Lieberman was severely wounded on the Eastern Front and captured by German forces. To avoid execution or deportation to a Nazi extermination camp due to his Jewish background, he assumed the identity of a deceased fellow Soviet soldier, Makar Petrovich Manchenko. Under this name, he was processed into the German military prisoner-of-war camp system.

Owing to his knowledge of German, Lieberman secretly translated articles from German newspapers for his fellow prisoners. Upon discovery by camp authorities, he was placed in solitary confinement under harsh punitive conditions. Biographical accounts identify his places of detention as the Kottwitz camp in the Sudetenland and later Sankt Pölten, Austria. Lieberman remained held until the end of hostilities, concluding his military period in Sankt Pölten, near Vienna, in 1946.

== Post-war repression and exile ==
After the war, Lieberman returned to Bessarabia. In the context of post-war Soviet repression against repatriated prisoners of war and individuals suspected of "Jewish nationalism," he was arrested and sentenced to seven years of internal exile (special settlement) in Siberia.

He was assigned to forced forestry labor in Irkutsk Oblast. While in exile, he met Esther (Fira) Markovna, who was also serving a political exile sentence. The couple married in 1953 in the Siberian town of Tayshet. Lieberman was released from exile in 1955.

== Later life ==
The Lieberman family in 1977. From right to left: Lev, Esther and their son, Avigdor

Following their release, the family returned to the Moldavian Soviet Socialist Republic and settled in Chișinău (Kishinev). In 1958, their son, Evet (Avigdor) Lieberman, was born.

Lieberman raised his family in a secular Jewish home that maintained ties to Jewish identity, literature, and Zionism, with personal libraries containing works in Yiddish, Hebrew, and Russian. Lieberman had a keen interest in literature, writing short prose fiction that appeared in several Russian-language periodicals from Moldova.

The Lieberman family emigrated to Israel on 18 June 1978, where Lev continued to publish in Russian-language periodicals. He died there on 2 July 2007, at the age of 86.
