= Tommy Reid (pastor) =

American pastor and evangelist

Bishop Tommy Reid
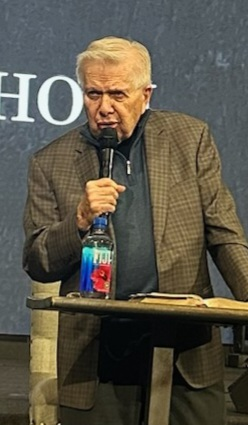
- Reid in 2025

Personal life
- Born: Thomas Fenton Reid; September 9, 1932 (age 93) Buffalo, New York, U.S.
- Spouse: Wanda
- Children: Aimee Reid Sych
- Education: Center Bible College

Religious life
- Religion: Christianity (evangelical Protestantism)
- Denomination: Pentecostal
- Church: Yoido Full Gospel Church; Bethel Temple Manila; Full Gospel Tabernacle
- Profession: Evangelist, Pentecostal Bishop

Senior posting
- Post: Full Gospel Tabernacle Bishop (1963-2013)
- Predecessor: Rev. Jack Risner
- Successor: Robert Stearns
- Website: tommyreid.org

Thomas Fenton Reid is an American pastor and evangelist who pastored and helped build, alongside his father, one of the largest Christian churches in the world and the Full Gospel Tabernacle located in Orchard Park, New York. Currently he resides in Colden, New York.

== Early life and career ==
Reverend Reid was born in Buffalo, New York to pastor Al Reid and his wife, Helen. After surviving polio as a young child, Tommy started full-time ministry in 1953, and travelled with his father across the world to Seoul in South Korea. There, he assisted pastor Paul Cho at the Yoido Full Gospel Church.

== Ministry in the Philippines ==
After his success in Seoul, in 1959, at the age of 26, Reid was named the senior pastor and leader of the Cathedral of Praise, then the Bethel Temple of Manila, the largest pentecostal church in the world.

== Return to Buffalo ==
Upon returning to Buffalo, Tommy Reid became the senior pastor and leader of the Full Gospel Tabernacle, a small church located in South Buffalo of about 120 people. During this time, the Charismatic movement swept through Buffalo and the Full Gospel Tabernacle grew from a small 120 member congregation to a massive 800 member congregation in one week. The church quickly became the largest pentecostal church in the United States, which prompted Reid to author his book, The Exploding Church. In 1977, the Buffalo School of the Bible was founded on the Tabernacle campus, training young people on how to become ministers and religious leaders He was named as Bishop of the Tabernacle, a title he would hold until 2013, when he appointed Eagles Wings Ministries founder Robert Stearns as his successor. Reid then took the title of Bishop emeritus.

Tommy befriended many evangelists during his time as senior leader of the Full Gospel Tabernacle, including Paula White, Paul Crouch, Jim Bakker, Oral Roberts, Jack Hayford and Benny Hinn. Hinn used to minister monthly at the Tabernacle.

A short film, entitled "How to Live Out a Dream" was made based on Reid's book of the same name. Pastor Paul Crouch did the introduction to the film.

== Personal life ==
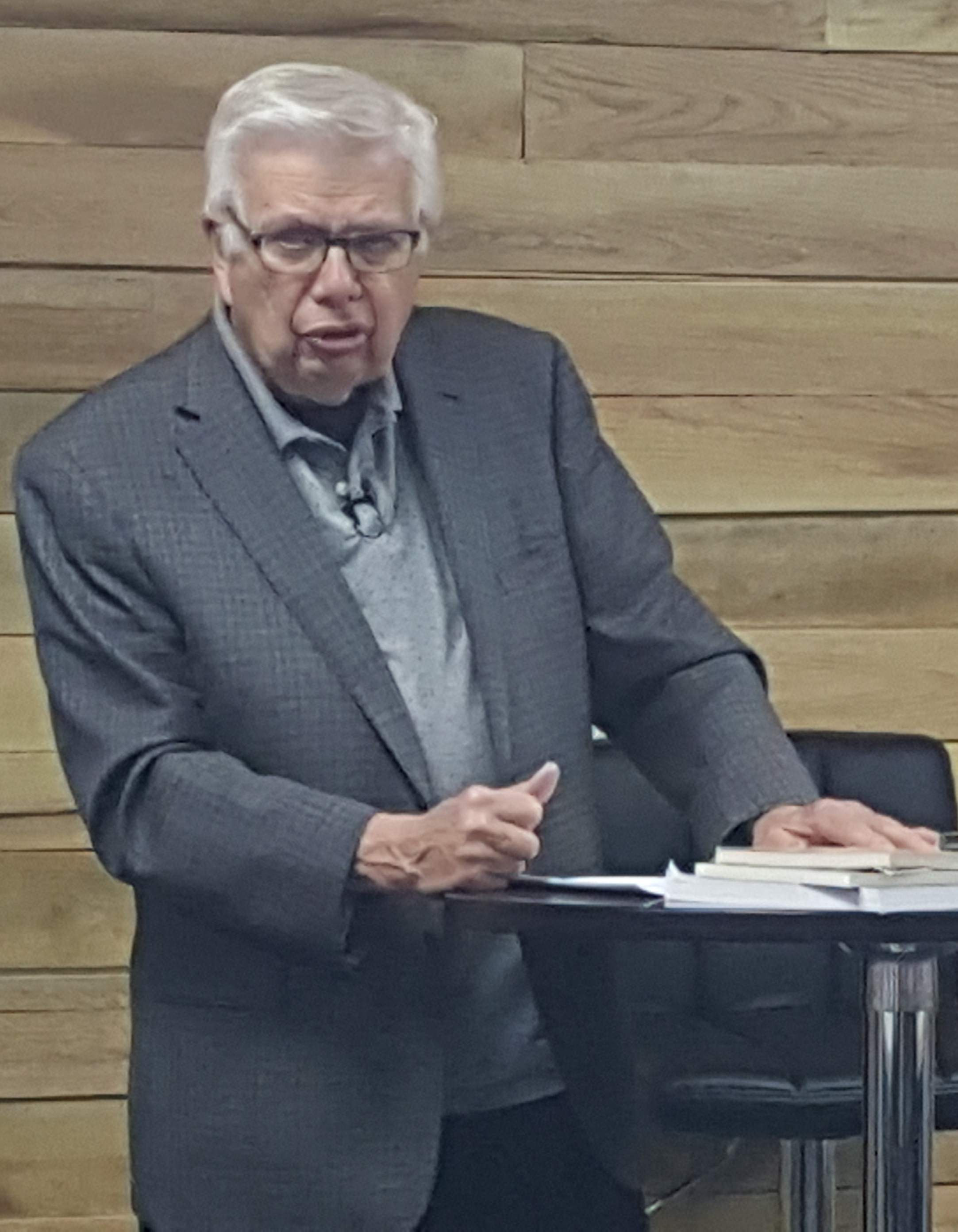
Reid in 2021

Bishop Reid is married to Wanda, and has one child, Aimee Sych, who is the worship pastor at the Full Gospel Tabernacle.

He resides in Colden, New York, a small town outside of Buffalo.
