= Robert Stearns (pastor) =

American pastor and evangelist

Bishop Robert Stearns
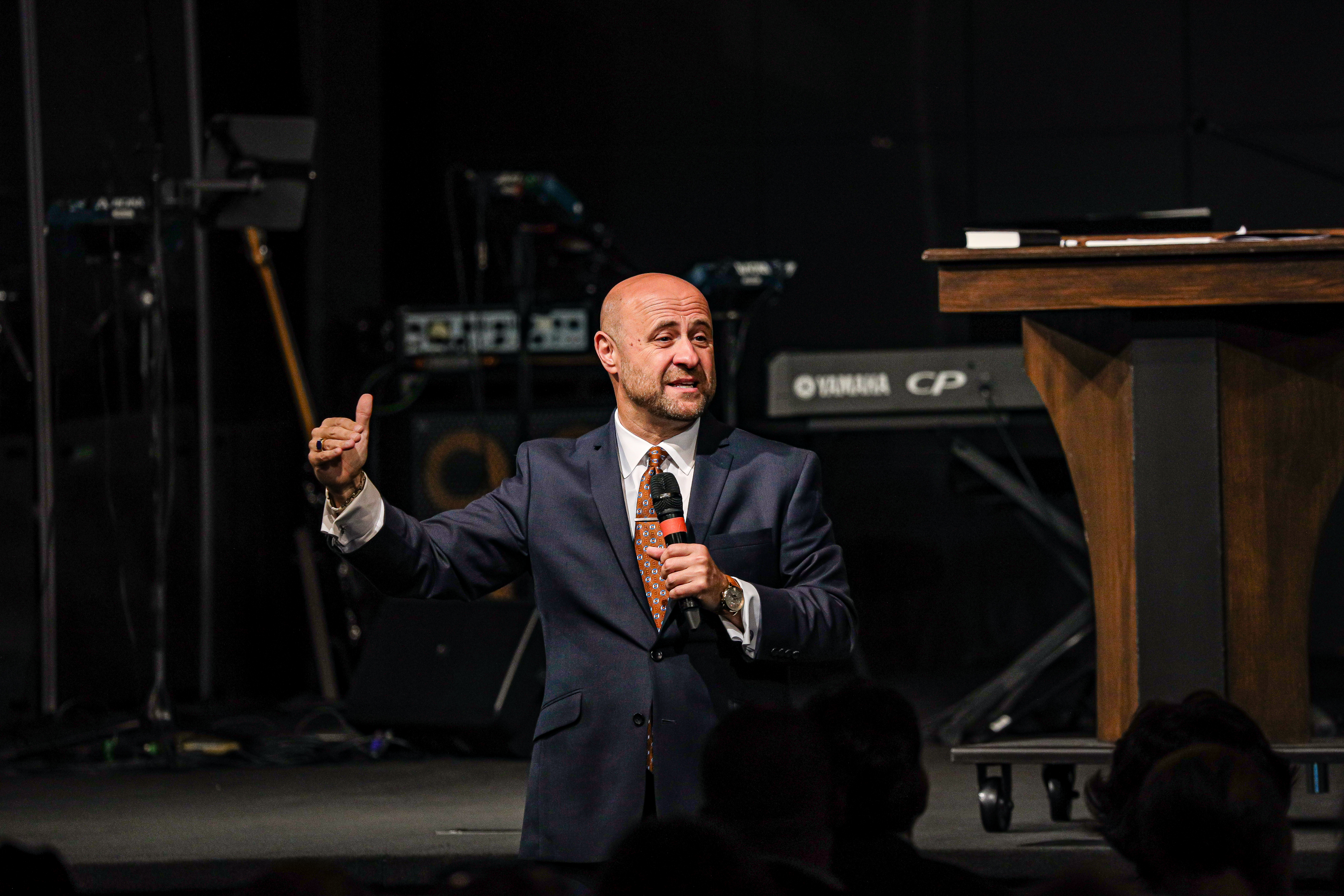

Personal life
- Born: Buffalo, New York, U.S.
- Children: 3
- Education: University of Valley Forge
- Website: eagleswings.org/robert-stearns/

Religious life
- Religion: Christianity (evangelical Protestantism)
- Denomination: Pentecostal
- Church: Eagle's Wings Ministries; Full Gospel Tabernacle
- Profession: Pastor, Pentecostal Bishop

Senior posting
- Post: Full Gospel Tabernacle Bishop (2013-present)
- Predecessor: Tommy Reid

Robert R. Stearns is an American pastor and Evangelical Christian leader who founded Eagle's Wings Ministries located in Clarence, New York and currently pastors the historic Tabernacle Church in Orchard Park, New York. A "leading voice in the Christian Zionist movement," Stearns is the leader and co-founder of the annual Day of Prayer for the Peace of Jerusalem: The single largest international Christian Zionist event and during which thousands of churches worldwide pray for the peace of Jerusalem. Currently, he resides in Clarence, New York with his three sons. They have begun to follow in his musical footsteps by forming a music collective called The Brothers of Mercy.

== Early career and founding Eagles' Wings ==
Stearns, after graduation from Valley Forge Christian College (VFCC) of the Assemblies of God, lived in Jerusalem in the 1990s volunteering for the International Christian Embassy. It was at VFCC where he discovered and studied Judeo-Christian relations and roots of Judaism in Christianity. A/G missionary Phill Goble of Artists for Israel was one of the main teachers on the subject at VFCC. Stearns says he sees an even stronger relationship between Jews and Christians in the near future. That said, Stearns did not fellowship with Jewish students during his time at VFCC. One of his mentors and counsellors was Loren McRae. His teachings are often quoted, without reference, in Stearns' books.

Upon returning home to Buffalo, New York, Robert discussed the possibilities of founding a pro-Israel ministry with the Thomas F. Reid, the senior leader and bishop of the Tabernacle Church. The new ministry Stearns founded is called Eagles' Wings.

Stearns was one of the original directors of Christians United for Israel.

== Eagles' Wings and Israel ==
Stearns founded many Eagles' Wings organizational initiatives, a main component of which is sponsoring trips to Israel. Bishop Stearns has brought over 25,000 people to the Holy Land, and has led dozens of specifically Christian delegations to visit Israel. One of its initiatives, the Nexus Leadership Missions organized by the Israel Christian Nexus, provides intensive educational tours of Israel for pastoral leaders.

He established the "Israel Experience College Scholarship Program," usually called "Israel Experience," a Christian equivalent of Birthright Israel, which brings college-age Christian students to Israel. The first group, a "pilot" trip with eleven participants, visited Israel in June 2004.

Stearns is a staunch advocate for the State of Israel, oftentimes meeting with foreign governments to help formulate and direct their politics toward Israel. In 2008, he was the Northeast regional director of Christians United for Israel. He was one of the founders and original directors of Christians United for Israel (CUFI) .

Stearns has spoken to audiences such as the House of Lords in London and the Israeli Knesset. Stearns, who sees Israel as threatened by other countries in the region, has declared his willingness to die defending Israel.

While Stearns would like all people to become Christian, he "strictly avoids proselytizing" Jews.

He was an outspoken proponent to moving the United States Embassy to Jerusalem.

== Day of Prayer for the Peace of Jerusalem ==
Stearns, along with Jack W. Hayford, created an event called the Global Day of Prayer for the Peace of Jerusalem, celebrated in churches worldwide and with a major gathering in the Holy Land of Israel one day a year. It is the largest Christian Zionist event, endorsed by the Knesset Christian Allies Caucus the event involves congregants in 200,000 churches in 175 nations worldwide praying for peace in Israel and its surrounding nations. The event has attracted Israeli and United States officials such as former Senator Joe Lieberman and United States Ambassador to Israel David M. Friedman.

Stearns co-founded of the annual Day of prayer in 2002. It is estimated that in 2019 more than half a million churches and as many as 100 million Christians and Jews around the world participated worldwide in the annual Day of Prayer for the Peace of Jerusalem. The event, held every year on the first Sunday in October, is inspired by the call to pray for Jerusalem in Psalm 122:6, which reads "Pray for the peace of Jerusalem: they shall prosper that love thee," in the King James Bible.

== Books and music ==
Stearns has written five books. The first was Prepare the Way, followed by Keepers of the Flame, The Cry of Mordecai, the Watchmen on the Wall manual and most recently, No We Can't. All of his books are based on his interpretation of biblical beliefs.

In addition to his four books, Robert released a solo album entitled The Impossible Dream and performed at the 15th anniversary ceremony of the September 11 attacks in St. Patrick's Cathedral in New York City.

== Preaching ==
Stearns preaches that "God has a plan, a purpose, a destiny for your life," using Biblical examples such as Esther, "an average, ordinary, everyday person who life had not dealt a good hand to," and yet "God had a plan for Esther."

== On seeking converts ==
Because Christianity is an evangelizing religion, Stearns is often accused of or asked about seeking to convert Jews to Christianity. The question has sometimes been framed as, "As a Christian, how can you not want to convert us?" his response is, "Of course I would love to see you become Christians, but I would never seek to convert you." He explains that as an Evangelical Christian he believes that Christians and Jews have specific roles in God's plan, and that he personally has "too much respect" for the Jewish people to suggest that any Jew should become something else.

== Tabernacle Church ==
In July 2013, Stearns was named as the bishop of a historic church in Orchard Park, New York, called the Full Gospel Tabernacle. He succeeded the church's longtime leader, Thomas F. Reid.
