= Yisrael BaAliyah =

Yisrael BaAliyah ישראל בעליה
- Leader: Natan Sharansky; Yuli Edelstein
- Founded: March 1996
- Dissolved: 10 March 2003
- Merged into: Likud
- Ideology: Zionism; Liberal conservatism Russian speakers' interests
- Political position: Centre-right to right-wing
- Most MKs: 7 (1996)
- Fewest MKs: 2 (2003)

Election symbol
- כן

Website
- aliya.org.il

Yisrael BaAliyah (Hebrew: ישראל בעלייה, lit. 'Israel on the Up') was a political party in Israel between its formation in 1996 and its merger into Likud in 2003. It was formed to represent the interests of Russian immigrants by former refuseniks Natan Sharansky and Yuli Edelstein. Initially a centrist party, it drifted to the right towards the end of its existence.

== History ==
The party was formed in 1996 by Sharansky, whose personal image as a dedicated and long-suffering idealist was intended to be the catalyst for an immigrant revolution in Israeli politics. "Yisrael BaAliyah" was chosen as the name for the party, both denoting its identification with immigration (aliyah being the Hebrew word for immigration to Israel), as well as the literal meaning of "Israel on the up".

With another ex-Soviet dissident Yul Edelstein as a co-founder, they chose a slogan stating that their political party is different: its leaders first go to prison and only then go into politics.

In its first electoral test, the May 1996 Knesset elections, the party won 5.7% of the vote and 7 seats, making it the sixth largest party in the Knesset. It joined Binyamin Netanyahu's Likud-led government, and was given two ministerial posts; Sharansky was appointed Minister of Industry and Trade, whilst Edelstein became Minister of Immigrant Absorption.

On 23 February 1999, Shortly before the 1999 Knesset elections, Michael Nudelman and Yuri Stern left the party to form Aliyah, which later entered into an alliance with another Russian-immigrant party, Yisrael Beiteinu.

In the elections, the party was reduced to six seats, but was now the fifth-largest in the Knesset, having campaigned on the popular motto "Ministry of Internal Affairs in our control" (МВД под наш контроль). It joined Ehud Barak's One Israel-led government, and was given one ministerial portfolio (Sharansky as Minister of Internal Affairs) and one deputy ministerial post (Marina Solodkin as Deputy Minister of Immigrant Absorption). On 20 July 1999, shortly after the elections, left-wingers Roman Bronfman and Alexander Tzinker left the party and formed the Democratic Choice faction. Yisrael BaAliyah left the government on 11 July 2000, in response to suggestions that Barak's negiotations with the Palestinians would result in a division of Jerusalem.

After Ariel Sharon won a special election for Prime Minister in 2001, the party joined his new government, and was again given one ministerial post (Sharansky as Minister of Housing and Construction) and one deputy position (Edelstein as Deputy Immigrant Absorption Minister). In addition, Sharansky was appointed Deputy Prime Minister.

In the January 2003 elections, the party was reduced to just two seats. Sharansky resigned from the Knesset, and was replaced by Edelstein. However, he remained party chairman, and decided to merge it into Likud (which had won the election with a haul of 38 seats). The merger went through on 10 March 2003, and Sharansky was appointed Minister of Jerusalem Affairs, whilst Solodkin was re-appointed Deputy Minister of Immigrant Absorption.

== Election results ==
Election	Leader	Votes	%	Seats	+/–	Status
1996	Natan Sharansky	174,994	5.73 (#6)	7 / 120	New	Coalition
1999	Natan Sharansky	171,705	5.19 (#5)	6 / 120	▼1	Coalition
2003	Natan Sharansky	67,719	2.15 (#12)	2 / 120	▼4	Opposition

== Knesset members ==
Knesset	Seats	MKs	Notes
14th	7	Roman Bronfman, Yuli Edelstein, Michael Nudelman, Natan Sharansky, Yuri Stern, Marina Solodkin, Zvi Weinberg	Nudelman and Stern left the party to form Aliyah
15th	6	Roman Bronfman, Yuli Edelstein, Gennady Riger, Natan Sharansky, Marina Solodkin, Alexander Tzinker	Bronfman and Tzinker left the party to form the Democratic Choice
16th	2	Yuli Edelstein, Natan Sharansky (replaced by Marina Solodkin)	Party merged into Likud shortly after the elections.
