= Roman Bronfman =

Israeli politician

- רומן ברונפמן
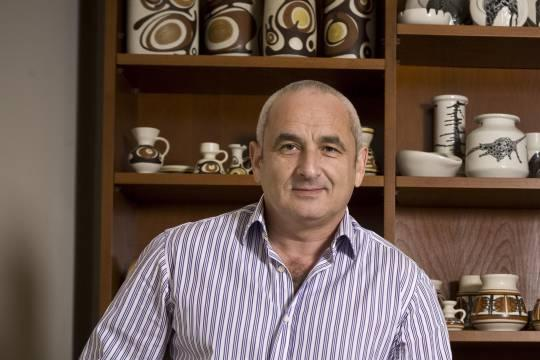

Faction represented in the Knesset
- 1996–1999: Yisrael BaAliyah
- 1999–2003: Democratic Choice
- 2003–2006: Meretz

Personal details
- Born: 22 April 1954 (age 72) Chernivtsi, Soviet Union

Roman Bronfman (Hebrew: רומן ברונפמן; born 22 April 1954) is a Ukrainian-born Israeli politician. He speaks Hebrew, English, Russian, and Ukrainian.

== Biography ==
Bronfman was born in Chernivtsi, Ukrainian SSR (now Ukraine), in the Soviet Union to a Jewish family. He studied at Chernivtsi University from 1971 to 1976. He was a journalist, and published articles in major newspapers in Moscow and Leningrad. Bronfman immigrated to Israel in 1980. He served in the Israeli Air Force, and participated in the 1982 Lebanon War. Following his military service, he studied at the Hebrew University of Jerusalem, and graduated with a PhD in Political Science in 1989. From 1986 to 1993, he was a lecturer at the Hebrew University and the University of Haifa. In the 1990s, he was a journalist for the Russian-language newspaper Aleph and for Maariv, and an announcer on Kol Israel's Russian-language service.

== Political career ==
In 1993 he became the Head of the Haifa Municipality Absorption Authority, and has held that post since then. That year he also was elected to the Haifa City Council, and became the Deputy Chairman of the Zionist Forum. He held both of those posts until 1996 when he was first elected to the Knesset. During his time in the Knesset he was a member of Yisrael BaAliyah and then the Democratic Choice.

He was a member of the House Committee, State Control Committee, Public Petitions Committee, Economic Affairs Committee, Constitution, Law and Justice Committee, Internal Affairs and Environment Committee, Committee on Drug Abuse, and the Committee for Immigration, Absorption, and Diaspora Affairs. During his time as a member of the Knesset he was also a member of the Social-Environmental Lobby, Environmental Lobby, Lobby for the War Against Drugs in Israel, and the Lobby for the Galil and the Negev.

He lost the 2006 Knesset election, and no longer serves as a member of the Knesset.

== Views and opinions ==
Bronfman has said that the Two State Solution is the only humane solution to the Israeli-Palestinian conflict. The unacceptable alternatives are to have a mass deportation of Palestinians from Gaza and the West Bank, or to brutally rule over the Palestinians in these territories.

In 2005 Bronfman submitted a bill to the Knesset that would amend the Dangerous Drugs Order so it would be legal to possess 50 grams, or about 1.8 ounces of cannabis, when before the legal amount to have in your possession was 15 grams, or 0.5 ounces. He said the total ban on cannabis had failed to stop cannabis use, and the way to stop its use was to go after drug dealers.

== Published works ==
- The Million that Changed the Middle East: Immigrants from the Former USSR, coauthored with Lily Galili
