= Michael Nudelman =

Israeli politician (1938–2019)

- מיכאל נודלמן
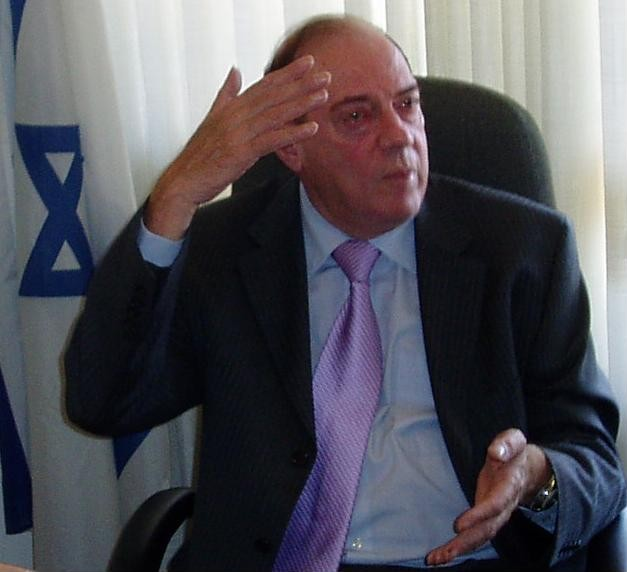

Faction represented in the Knesset
- 1996–1999: Yisrael BaAliyah
- 1999: Aliyah
- 2003–2006: Yisrael Beiteinu
- 2003–2006: National Union
- 2006: Independent
- 2006–2009: Kadima

Personal details
- Born: 30 June 1938; Kiev, Soviet Union
- Died: 25 December 2018 (aged 80); Kiryat Shmona, Israel

Michael Nudelman (Hebrew: מיכאל נודלמן; 30 June 1938 – 25 December 2018) was an Israeli politician who served as a member of the Knesset for Yisrael BaAliyah, Aliyah, the National Union, Yisrael Beiteinu and Kadima between 1996 and 2009.

== Political career ==
Born in Kiev in the Soviet Union (today Ukraine), Nudelman made aliyah to Israel in 1991.

He was elected to the 14th Knesset as a representative of Yisrael BaAliyah. He resigned from the party along with Yuri Stern and formed the Aliyah party, which later merged with Yisrael Beiteinu, and as a member of this party he was elected to the 15th Knesset and to the 16th Knesset (as part of the National Union list, which Yisrael Beiteinu joined in that election).

In the 14th Knesset he served as chairman of the Science and Technology Committee, and he served as Deputy Chairman of the 16th Knesset.

In 2005 Nudelman supported the disengagement plan. Towards the end of the 16th Knesset he resigned from the party and announced that he was joining Kadima, seeing out the rest of the Knesset term as an independent MK. He was returned to the Knesset on Kadima's list in the 2006 elections.

Prior to the 2009 elections he left Kadima and reformed Aliyah, renaming it Yisrael HaMithadeshet. However, the party failed to cross the electoral threshold, and he lost his seat.
