= Israel Allies Foundation =

Advocacy group

- Founded: 2007; 19 years ago
- Founders: Binyamin Elon, Uri Bank, and Willem Griffioen
- Headquarters: Jerusalem
- President: Josh Reinstein
- Board of directors: Uri Bank; Dave Weldon (Chairman)
- Revenue: $1,441,818 (2018)
- Expenses: $709,921 (2018)
- Staff: 4
- Website: israelallies.org

The Israel Allies Foundation (IAF, also known as the International Israel Allies Caucus Foundation) is a pro-Israel advocacy group that promotes their views with legislators. IAF works with politicians internationally to mobilize support for its values. One of its main goals is keeping Jerusalem fully under Israeli sovereignty.

Parliamentary groups affiliated with the IAF include the Congressional Israel Allies Caucus in the United States House of Representatives, the Knesset Christian Allies Caucus in the Israeli parliament, and similar groups in Uruguay, the Philippines, South Korea, Brazil, South Africa, Japan, Australia, Finland, Italy, Canada, Costa Rica, and Malawi. As of 2021, IAF supported 50 pro-Israel parliamentary groups worldwide.

IAF takes politicians and heads of pro-Israel organizations on paid-for tours of Israel.

== History ==
In January 2004, the Knesset Christian Allies Caucus (KCAC) was founded by Israeli politician Yuri Stern of the Yisrael Beiteinu party and seven other Israeli politicians. The goal of the organization was to harness support for Israel from Christian leaders around the world. Its first sister caucus, the Congressional Israel Allies Caucus, was established in the United States Congress in 2006.

This led to the creation of IAF in 2007 by orthodox rabbi Benny Elon (president) and his long-time aide and parliamentary assistant Uri Bank, both leaders of the Israeli right to far-right party Moledet (Elon became leader in 2001 after his predecessor was assassinated). Elon, a well-known figure in the radical settler movement, favored annexing the occupied territories and voluntary transfer of the Palestinians to Jordan. He served as Tourism Minister in two stints from 2001 to 2004 and used his position to build ties with the American evangelical Christian community.

Elon, 62, died of cancer in 2017 and Josh Reinstein took over as president of IAF.

== Organization ==
As of 2024, the organization's Christian advisory board of directors included Tim Dunn (chairman), Dave Weldon, Mike Sodrel, Dick Saulsbury, Earl Cox, Trent Franks, Bill Holmes, Larry Huch, and Becky Brimmer.

IAF has established parliamentary groups consisting of strongly pro-Israel politicians in many countries. In the US and some other countries, such groups are known as caucuses.

=== Knesset Christian Allies Caucus ===
The Knesset Christian Allies Caucus is the IAF's caucus in the Israeli parliament - the Knesset. The Caucus was founded by Yuri Stern of the National Union in 2004. In the past, the Caucus was co-chaired by David Rotem (till March 31, 2015) and Gila Gamliel. Deputy Speaker of the Knesset MK Sharren Haskel is the current chair of the caucus. As of 2020, it has 17 members, stemming from a spectrum of political parties.

=== Congressional Israel Allies Caucus ===
The Congressional Israel Allies Caucus is the IAF's caucus in the United States House of Representatives. It was formed on July 27, 2006, to affirm United States support for Israel amidst growing international pressure for Israel to implement an immediate ceasefire during the Israel-Lebanon conflict. It is, according to the IAF, the only bipartisan caucus in support of Israel in the U.S. House. The Caucus was modeled after its counterpart in the Knesset, the Christian Allies Caucus.

Founding members of the Caucus were Dave Weldon (R-FL), Eliot Engel (D-NY), Trent Franks (R-AZ), and Gene Green (D-TX). Founding co-chairs were Mike Pence (R-IN); former House Minority Whip Eric Cantor (R-VI); and Eliot Engel (D-NY). The co-chairs of the Caucus in the 116th United States Congress were Eliot Engel (D-NY), Doug Lamborn (R-CO), Brad Sherman (D-CA), and Steve Chabot (R-OH).

== Finances ==
Prominent donors to IAF include the Moskowitz family foundations, the Jewish Community Federation of San Francisco, the Newton and Rochelle Becker charities, and the MZ Foundation who donated $760,000, $300,000, $115,000, and $100,000 respectively to the Israel Allies Caucus Foundation Inc. between 2009 and 2013. IAF is also supported by the Milstein Family Foundation. IAF also received funding from Concert, an Israeli not-for-profit that receives matching fund on donations it receives, from the Israeli government. The Forward discussed the possibility that this might mean IAF grants to Americans breach the FARA act.

== Judeo-Christian values ==
IAF describes itself as working on a foundation of Judeo-Christian values, promoting cooperation among politicians worldwide, who support the right of the State of Israel to exist in peace and to have secure borders. Bank in 2014 described the strategy: "Evangelical Christians are powerful in their countries and they love Israel, but they haven't been taught how to leverage that in our favor ... That is what we're doing."

According to the late Elon, Christians and Israel stand together against radical Islam: "The Christian world is Israel's most strategic ally both existentially and spiritually. Existentially, they stand up against radical Islam and their desire to destroy the state of Israel. Spiritually, Christians are our partners in the clash of cultures between our values and those of radical Islam."

Reinstein believes in a strategy which he calls faith-based diplomacy: "Faith-based diplomacy is the most important weapon we have in our arsenal today, ... In areas with almost no Jews, without Christian support Israel wouldn't have such a robust international standing. In America, we have Jewish and Christian support—a stacked deck—but in places like the Philippines, without Christians, Israel wouldn't have support." He believes that Christians should realize that supersessionism is wrong and that the Old Covenant still holds: "How do you explain Israel if you believe you've replaced Israel? We have the ingathering of exiles; the desert blooming; Israel as a light unto the nations through its technology, and a lot of mainstream Christians were like, 'Wait a minute, we were wrong. The covenant is an everlasting one. Look at what God is doing for the Jewish people in Israel. We want to be a part of that.'"

IAF distances itself from Christian groups that proselytize among Jews.

== Issues ==
IAF's policy positions were enumerated in its 2008 "Declaration of Purpose and Solidarity with the People and State of Israel" document. The document was ratified by the International Israel Allies Caucus Chairmen and presented the following eight points:

1. The People of Israel have an inalienable right to live in peace and security in their historic homeland.
2. As a sovereign state recognized by the United Nations, Israel has the right to govern its immigration and naturalization policies and to encourage and receive Jewish people from around the globe who choose to return.
3. Jerusalem is, and should be, the undivided capital of Israel and the Jewish People, and in recognition of this, all of the nations of the world should locate their embassies in Jerusalem.
4. While we all yearn for peace, we recognize that pressure on Israel from the international community to negotiate and make concessions with those sworn to its destruction has not led to peace; we regard such attempts as futile.
5. The Iranian regime with its developing arsenal of weapons of mass destruction and its stated goal of destroying Israel constitutes a clear and present danger to the existence of the State of Israel that must be opposed.
6. Israel's protective military actions are lawful under international law and are consistent with Article 51 of the U.N. Charter, which reserves unto each nation the right to engage in acts of self-defense.
7. We support the Government of Israel as acting within its rights and obligations to its citizens when it stands resolutely in defense of its sovereign territory and acts preemptively if necessary, to ensure the protection of its citizens and the survival of its national existence.
8. Social justice demands that the compensation claims of the Jewish refugees from Arab lands be recognized on equal terms with those of Arab refugees from 1948.

=== Jerusalem fully under Israeli sovereignty ===
According to Hannu Takkula, Chair of the European Parliament's Israel Allies Caucus, the group "celebrate(s) Jerusalem as the undivided capital of the Jewish State of Israel." IAF supports moving the American Embassy to Jerusalem.

=== BDS movement ===
IAF opposes the BDS movement, an organization that calls for comprehensive boycotts of Israel until it stops its alleged human rights violations against the Palestinians. IAF lobbies for anti-BDS laws, so called because their intent is to discourage participation in boycotts of Israel. Those laws requires state contractors to pledge that they are not boycotting Israel. IAF sees boycotting Israel as a form of discrimination.

IAF has also fought EU labeling regulations that would forbid goods produced in the Israeli settlements built in the West Bank and Golan Heights from being labelled "Made in Israel."

== Activities ==
=== Jerusalem Day ===
IAF holds annual events for politicians on Jerusalem Day to commemorate Israel's reunification of Jerusalem in the Six-Day War in 1967. In the US, the event is held on Capitol Hill and attended by members of congress.

=== Chairmen's Conference ===
IAF holds annual conferences for its parliamentary groups' chairmen in Jerusalem.

=== Tours of Israel and the West Bank ===
IAF is known for organizing and sponsoring tours for politicians to visit Israel on fact-finding missions. Legislators tour Israel and meet with Israeli politicians, Palestinian Arabs, Christian Arabs and families to victims of Palestinian violence. The Israeli tours have been criticized as propaganda.
