= Yuri Stern =

Former Russian-Israeli politician and journalist

- יורי שטרן
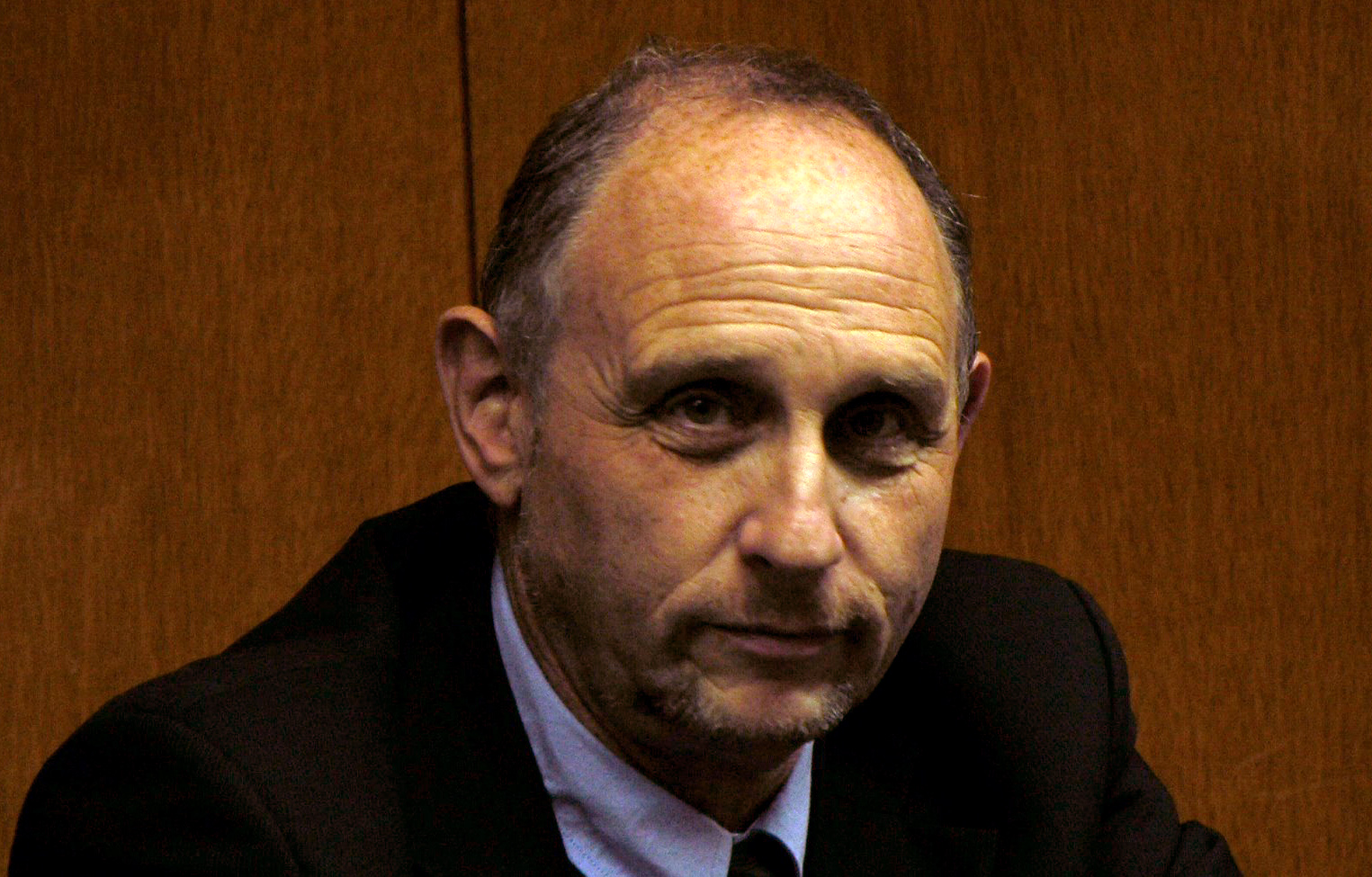

Faction represented in the Knesset
- 1996–1999: Yisrael BaAliyah
- 1999: Aliyah
- 1999–2003: Yisrael Beiteinu
- 2003–2006: National Union
- 2006–2007: Yisrael Beiteinu

Personal details
- Born: 29 March 1949 Moscow, Soviet Union
- Died: 16 January 2007 (aged 57)

Yuri Stern (Hebrew: יורי שטרן, Russian: Юрий Штерн, romanized: Yuriy Shtern, 29 March 1949 – 16 January 2007) was a Russian-Israeli politician and journalist. He was a member of the Knesset from 1996 until his death, first as a member of Yisrael BaAliyah and later on behalf of Yisrael Beiteinu.

== Background ==
Born in Moscow, Stern was active in promoting Jewish immigration from the Soviet Union. He emigrated to Israel in 1981. He had a PhD in economics from Moscow University.

== Political career ==
Stern was first elected to the Knesset in the 1996 elections on the list of Yisrael BaAliyah, a Russian immigrant party. However, after internal disagreements within the party he broke away with Michael Nudelman to form a new party, Aliyah.

For the 1999 elections, Aliyah ran together with Yisrael Beiteinu, another Russian immigrant party, with Stern retaining his seat. Aliyah was soon merged into Yisrael Beiteinu and ceased to exist.

After Ariel Sharon beat Ehud Barak in a special election for Prime Minister in 2001, Yisrael Beiteinu was added to Sharon's coalition government and Stern was appointed Deputy Minister in the Ministry in the Prime Minister's Office.

He retained his seat again in the 2003 elections, in which Yisrael Beiteinu ran as part of the National Union alliance. He was re-elected in the 2006 elections in second place on Yisrael Beiteinu's list (the party ran alone in the election).

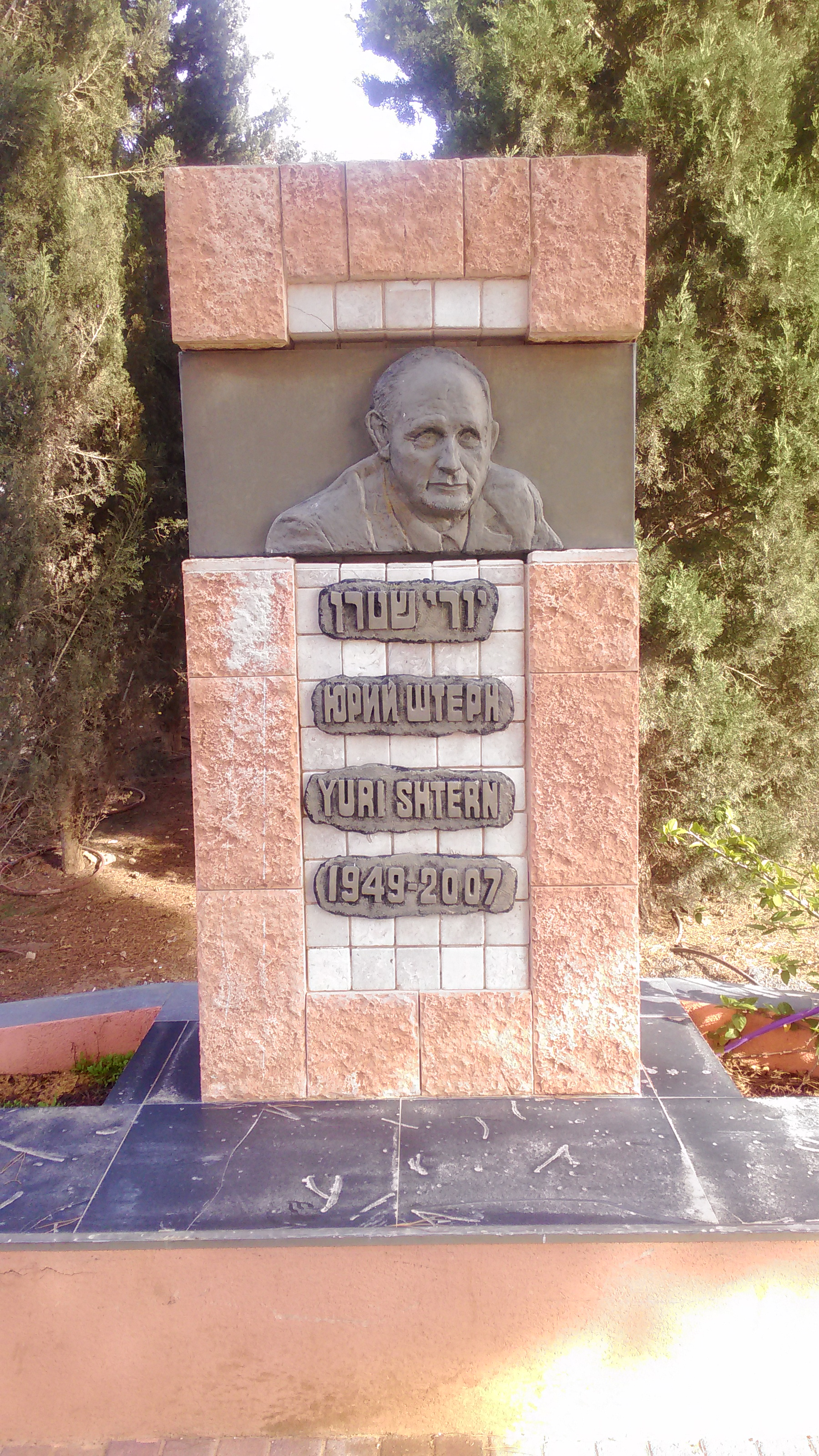
A monument dedicated in memory of Member of Knesset Yuri Stern, an activist for immigrant rights.

Whilst a Knesset Member, Stern served as chairman in two Knesset committees; the Internal Affairs and the Environment Committee, and the State Inspection Committee. He was also chairman of two Knesset lobbies; the Knesset Christian Allies Caucus, which he helped form, and the Knesset Forum on the Middle East.

He also wrote several articles for newspapers including The Wall Street Journal, The Jerusalem Post, and Ma'ariv, as well as several academic papers on economics of the USSR.

Stern was also a member of several other organisations, including the Zionist Forum (within of which he was a member of the management for the Israeli Zionist Forum), and others mostly related to immigration and immigrant absorption. He was a vehement opponent of land surrender to Palestinian Authority.

Stern died of cancer on January 16, 2007. The Yuri Shtern Holist Center was created in his memory which helps cancer patients. The Yuri Stern Prize for the Arts is awarded every year. A street was named after him in Jerusalem and a monument was created in Dimona.
