= Asher Ohana =

Israeli politician (born 1945)

Ministerial roles
- 2001–2003: Minister of Religious Affairs

Personal details
- Born: 1945 (age 79–80) Morocco

Asher Ohana (Hebrew: אשר אוחנה; born 1945) is an Israeli civil servant who served as Minister of Religious Affairs between 2001 and 2003.

== Biography ==
Born in Morocco in 1945, Ohana immigrated to Israel in 1956. He attended a religious high school. After leaving school in 1962 he carried out his military service in the Israel Defense Forces in the civil defense unit. He later qualified as an accountant, and worked as an accountant, treasurer, and director of payroll and human resources for the Beit Shemesh municipality, then as a private accountant. He started working as a project manager for a building company in 1987.

Ohana joined Shas in 1992 and served on Beit Shemesh's local council. Between 1993 and 1996 he was the party's treasurer, then served as senior adviser to Minister of Religious Affairs Eli Suissa between 1996 and 1997. Between 1997 and 1998 he was Director General of the Ministry of Religious Affairs, and in 1999 became Shas' secretary general. He also served as secretary general of the Ma'ayan HaChinuch HaTorani religious educational network on behalf of the party.

When Shas joined Ariel Sharon's national unity government in 2001, Ohana was appointed Minister of Religious Affairs, despite not being a member of the Knesset. He remained in the post until the formation of a new government following the 2003 elections.

After leaving the Knesset Ohana returned to the private sector and entered municipal politics. He is the owner of an accounting company, and chaired the committee in charge of the religious councils in Acre and Shlomi. In 2015 he became chairman of the religious council in Netanya.

Ohana is married with six children. His son Yehuda serves as treasurer of the Shas movement.
