= Twenty-seventh government of Israel =

1996–99 government led by Benjamin Netanyahu

First Netanyahu Cabinet
- 27th Cabinet of Israel

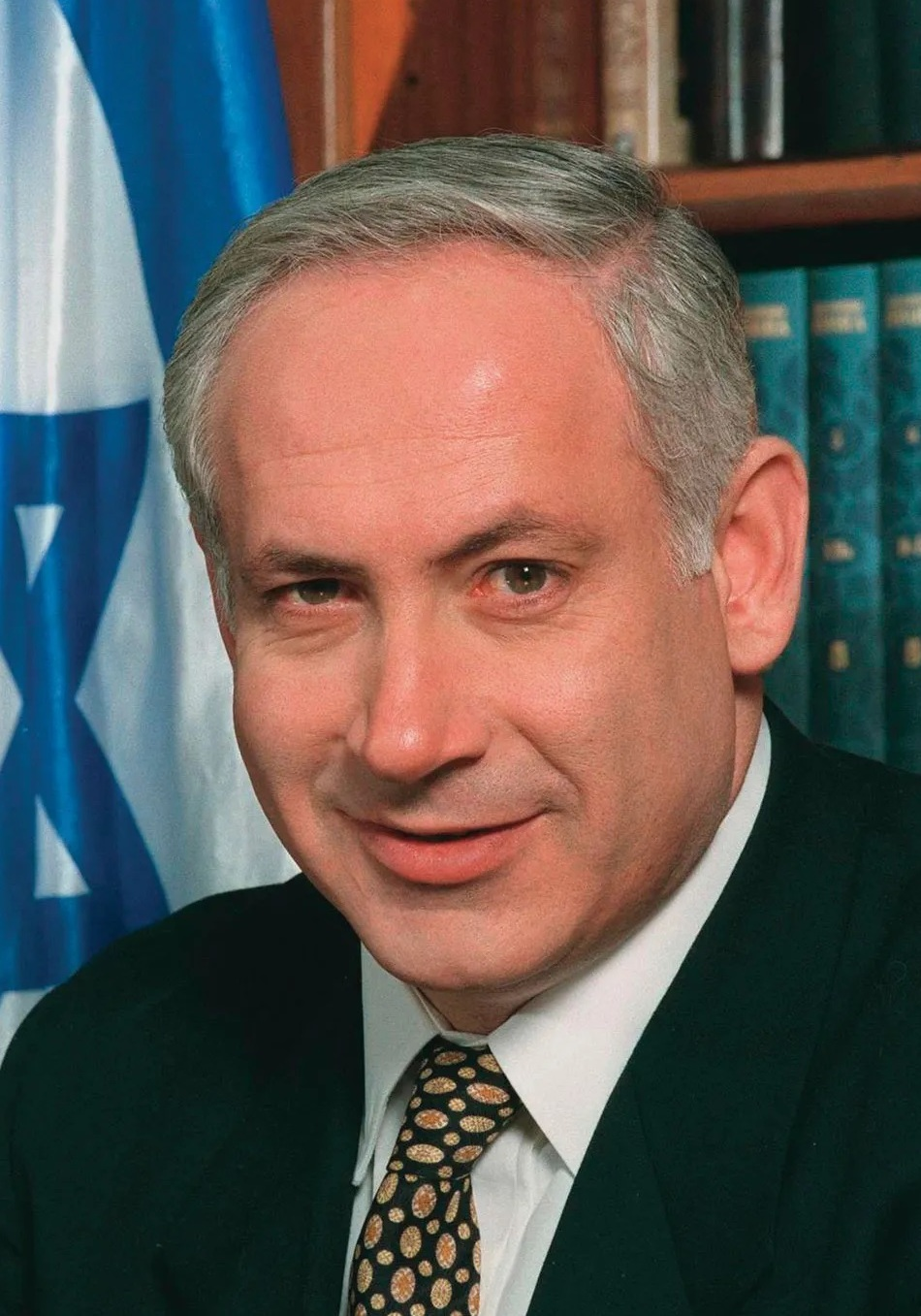
- Date formed: 18 June 1996
- Date dissolved: 6 July 1999

People and organisations
- Head of state: Ezer Weizman
- Head of government: Benjamin Netanyahu
- Member parties: Likud; Gesher; Tzomet; National Religious Party; Yisrael BaAliyah; Third Way; Shas; United Torah Judaism
- Status in legislature: Government coalition
- Opposition party: Labor
- Opposition leader: Shimon Peres (until 1997); Ehud Barak (until 1999)

History
- Election: 1996
- Legislature term: 14th Knesset
- Predecessor: 26th cabinet of Israel
- Successor: 28th cabinet of Israel

The twenty-seventh government of Israel was formed by Benjamin Netanyahu of Likud on 18 June 1996. Although his Likud-Gesher-Tzomet alliance won fewer seats than Labor, Netanyahu formed the government after winning the country's first ever direct election for Prime Minister, narrowly defeating incumbent Shimon Peres. This government was the first formed by an Israeli national born in the state after independence in 1948 (the seventeenth government of 1974–1977 was the first to be formed by a native-born Israeli, although Rabin was born in the territory prior to independence).

Together with Likud-Gesher-Tzomet, Netanyahu also included Shas, the National Religious Party, Yisrael BaAliyah, United Torah Judaism and the Third Way in the government, with the coalition holding 66 of the 120 seats in the Knesset. The government was also supported, but not joined, by the two-seat Moledet faction. Gesher left the coalition on 6 January 1998, but the government remained in place until 6 July 1999, when Ehud Barak formed the twenty-eighth government after defeating Netanyahu in the 1999 election for Prime Minister.

== Cabinet members ==
Position	Person	Party
Prime Minister	Benjamin Netanyahu	Likud
Deputy Prime Minister	David Levy (until 6 January 1998)	Likud-Gesher-Tzomet
Deputy Prime Minister	Zevulun Hammer (until 20 January 1998)^{1}	National Religious Party
Deputy Prime Minister	Rafael Eitan	Likud-Gesher-Tzomet
Deputy Prime Minister	Moshe Katsav	Likud-Gesher-Tzomet
Minister of Agriculture	Rafael Eitan	Likud-Gesher-Tzomet
Minister of Communications	Limor Livnat	Likud-Gesher-Tzomet
Minister of Defense	Yitzhak Mordechai (until 25 January 1999)	Likud-Gesher-Tzomet
Minister of Defense	Moshe Arens (from 27 January 1999)	Not an MK ^{2}
Minister of Education, Culture and Sport	Zevulun Hammer (until 20 January 1998)^{1}	National Religious Party
Minister of Education, Culture and Sport	Yitzhak Levy (from 25 February 1998)	National Religious Party
Minister of Energy and Infrastructure ^{4}	Yitzhak Levy (until 8 July 1996)	National Religious Party
Minister of Energy and Infrastructure ^{4}	Ariel Sharon (from 8 July 1996)	Likud-Gesher-Tzomet
Minister of the Environment	Rafael Eitan	Likud-Gesher-Tzomet
Minister of Finance	Dan Meridor (until 20 June 1997)	Likud-Gesher-Tzomet
Minister of Finance	Benjamin Netanyahu (20 June – 9 July 1997)	Likud-Gesher-Tzomet
Minister of Finance	Ya'akov Ne'eman (9 July 1997 – 18 December 1998)	Not an MK
Minister of Finance	Benjamin Netanyahu (18 December 1998 – 23 February 1999)	Likud-Gesher-Tzomet
Minister of Finance	Meir Sheetrit (from 23 February 1999)	Likud-Gesher-Tzomet
Minister of Foreign Affairs	David Levy (until 6 January 1998)	Likud-Gesher-Tzomet
Minister of Foreign Affairs	Ariel Sharon (from 13 October 1998)	Likud-Gesher-Tzomet
Minister of Health	Tzachi Hanegbi (until 12 November 1996)	Likud-Gesher-Tzomet
Minister of Health	Joshua Matza (from 12 November 1996)	Likud-Gesher-Tzomet
Minister of Housing	Benjamin Netanyahu	Likud-Gesher-Tzomet
Minister of Immigrant Absorption	Yuli-Yoel Edelstein	Yisrael BaAliyah
Minister of Industry and Trade	Natan Sharansky	Yisrael BaAliyah
Minister of Internal Affairs	Eli Suissa	Not an MK ^{3}
Minister of Internal Security	Avigdor Kahalani	Third Way
Minister of Justice	Ya'akov Ne'eman (until 10 August 1996)	Not an MK
Minister of Justice	Benjamin Netanyahu (10 August – 4 September 1996)	Likud-Gesher-Tzomet
Minister of Justice	Tzachi Hanegbi (from 4 September 1996)	Likud-Gesher-Tzomet
Minister of Labour and Social Welfare	Eli Yishai	Shas
Minister of Religious Affairs	Benjamin Netanyahu (until 7 August 1996)	Likud-Gesher-Tzomet
Minister of Religious Affairs	Eli Suissa (7 August 1996 – 12 August 1997)	Not an MK ^{3}
Minister of Religious Affairs	Benjamin Netanyahu (12–22 August 1997)	Likud-Gesher-Tzomet
Minister of Religious Affairs	Zevulun Hammer (22 August 1997 – 20 January 1998)^{1}	National Religious Party
Minister of Religious Affairs	Benjamin Netanyahu (20 January – 25 February 1998)	Likud-Gesher-Tzomet
Minister of Religious Affairs	Yitzhak Levy (25 February – 13 September 1998)	National Religious Party
Minister of Religious Affairs	Eli Suissa (from 13 September 1998)	Not an MK ^{3}
Minister of Science and Technology	Michael Eitan (until 13 July 1998)	Likud-Gesher-Tzomet
Minister of Science and Technology	Silvan Shalom (from 13 July 1998)	Likud-Gesher-Tzomet
Minister of Tourism	Moshe Katsav	Likud-Gesher-Tzomet
Minister of Transportation	Yitzhak Levy (until 25 February 1998)	National Religious Party
Minister of Transportation	Shaul Yahalom (from 25 February 1998)	National Religious Party
Minister without Portfolio	Shaul Amor (from 20 January 1999)	Likud-Gesher-Tzomet
Minister for Israeli Arab Affairs	Moshe Katsav	Likud-Gesher-Tzomet
Deputy Minister in the Prime Minister's Office	Yigal Bibi (until 7 August 1996)	National Religious Party
Deputy Minister in the Prime Minister's Office	Michael Eitan (from 13 July 1998)	Likud
Deputy Minister of Defense	Silvan Shalom	Likud
Deputy Minister of Education, Culture and Sport	Moshe Peled (until 20 January 1998)	Likud-Gesher-Tzomet
Deputy Minister of Education, Culture and Sport	Moshe Peled (28 January – 2 November 1998)	Likud-Gesher-Tzomet
Deputy Minister of Education, Culture and Sport	Eliezer Sandberg	Likud-Gesher-Tzomet
Deputy Minister of Finance	David Magen (until 20 May 1997)	Likud-Gesher-Tzomet
Deputy Minister of Health	Shlomo Benizri	Shas
Deputy Minister of Housing	Meir Porush	United Torah Judaism
Deputy Minister of Religious Affairs	Aryeh Gamliel (13–22 August 1998)	Shas
Deputy Minister of Religious Affairs	Yigal Bibi (13 August 1996 – 20 January 1998)	National Religious Party
Deputy Minister of Religious Affairs	Aryeh Gamliel (24 August 1997 – 20 January 1998)	Shas
Deputy Minister of Religious Affairs	Yigal Bibi (from 25 January 1998)	National Religious Party
Deputy Minister of Religious Affairs	Aryeh Gamliel (from 25 January 1998)	Shas

^{1} Died in office.

^{2} Although Arens was not a Knesset member at the time, he had previously been an MK for Likud.

^{3} Although Suissa was not a Knesset member at the time, he was elected to the Knesset on the Shas list in 1999.

^{4} The name of the post was changed to Minister of National Infrastructure on 8 July 1996.
