= Dror Amos =

Dror David Amos (born 18 December 1980) is an Israeli retired officer and politician.

== Biography ==
Dror Amos was born in Haifa, to a Traditionalist family, and grew up in Nesher. Amos served more than 25 years in the IDF Logistics Corps, and moved to Yeruham during his service.

Following his retirement, he established a charity for the families of fallen soldiers and civilian victims. In June 2025, Amos was appointed head of the Haifa Religious Council.

Amos joined Shas in September 2026 and was assigned the sixth slot on its electoral list in that year's Knesset election. He was elected as the party won six seats. He gave up his seat on 8 November alongside Aryeh Deri and Moshe Abutbul, two days before the new Knesset's inauguration.

== Controversies ==
On 19 September 2026, Channel 12 published a story alleging that Amos, as head of the Haifa Religious Council, attempted to condition the funding of a new synagogue on the hiring of Amos' friend to a fictitious post. Channel 12 also claimed that Amos' charity, which received several million ILS from the Ministry of Religious Services, provided limited assistance to victims, was registered out of Amos' private villa and provided 2.5 Million ILS in Scholarships to Yeshiva students.

== Personal life ==
Amos is a resident of Yeruham.
