= Netanyahu government =

Netanyahu government refers to the cabinet formed by Israeli Prime Minister Benjamin Netanyahu, it may refer to:

- 27th government of Israel, 1st Netanyahu Cabinet (1996 - 1999)
- 32nd government of Israel, 2nd Netanyahu Cabinet (2009 - 2013)
- 33rd government of Israel, 3rd Netanyahu Cabinet (2013 - 2015)
- 34th government of Israel, 4th Netanyahu Cabinet (2015 - 2020)
- 35th government of Israel, 5th Netanyahu Cabinet (2020 - 2021)
- 36th government of Israel, 6th Netanyahu Cabinet (2022 - present)

== See also ==
- Political career of Benjamin Netanyahu
