= Ariel Sharon =

Prime Minister of Israel from 2001 to 2006

- אריאל שרון
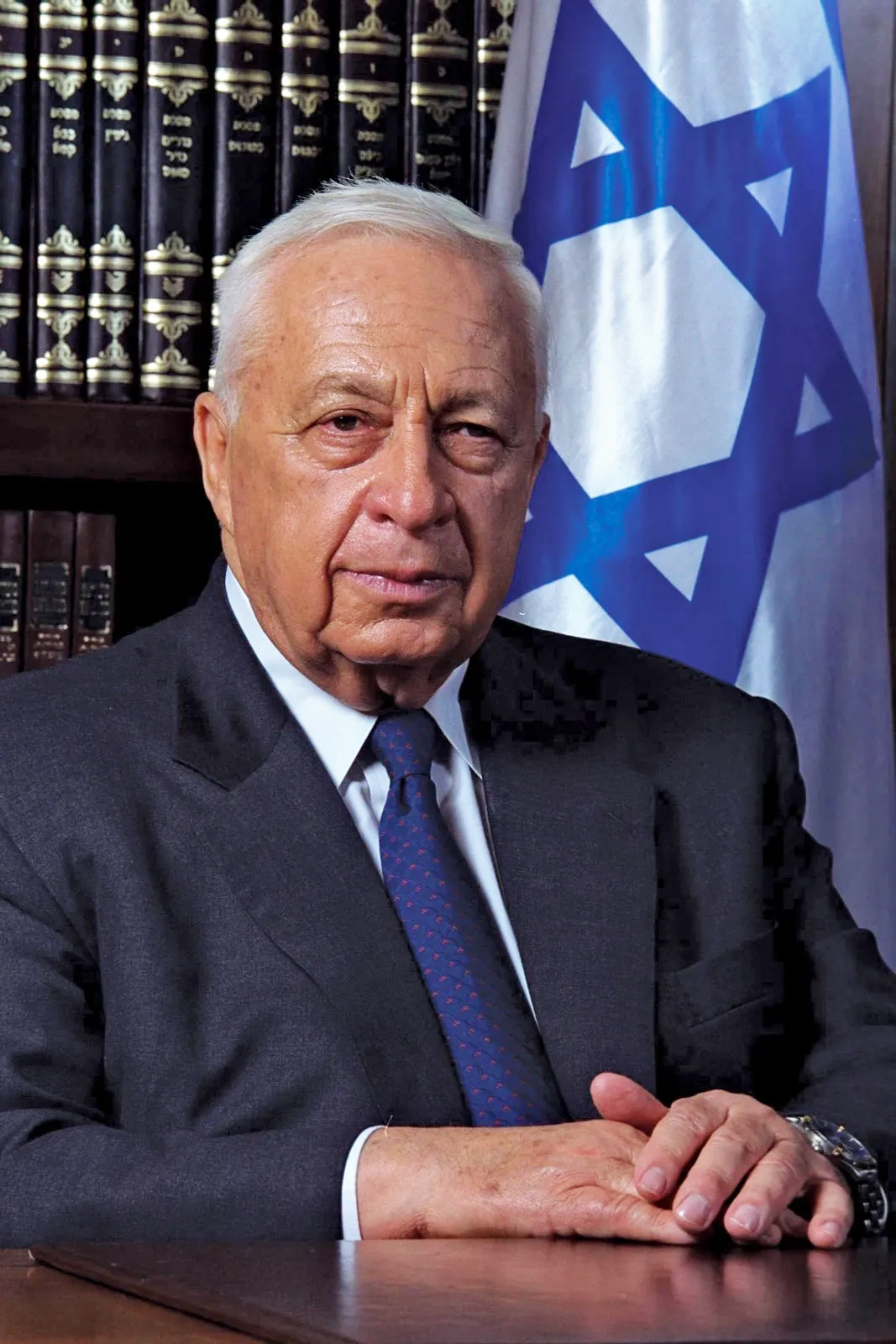
- Official portrait, 2001

Prime Minister of Israel
- In office 7 March 2001 – 14 April 2006^{[nb]}
- President: Moshe Katsav
- Deputy: Ehud Olmert
- Preceded by: Ehud Barak
- Succeeded by: Ehud Olmert

Leader of the Opposition
- In office 6 July 1999 – 7 March 2001^{[nb]}
- Prime Minister: Ehud Barak
- Preceded by: Ehud Barak
- Succeeded by: Yossi Sarid

Chairman of Likud
- In office 6 July 1999 – 21 November 2005
- Preceded by: Benjamin Netanyahu
- Succeeded by: Benjamin Netanyahu

Ministerial portfolios
- 1977–1981: Agriculture
- 1981–1983: Defense
- 1984–1990: Industry and Trade
- 1990–1992: Housing and Construction
- 1996–1999: National Infrastructure
- 1998–1999: Foreign Affairs
- 2001–2003: Immigrant Absorption
- 2002–2003: Industry and Trade
- 2002: Foreign Affairs
- 2003: Communications; Religious Affairs

Member of the Knesset
- In office 13 June 1977 – 17 April 2006
- In office 21 January 1974 – 23 December 1974

Personal details
- Born: Ariel Scheinerman(n); 26 February 1928 Kfar Malal, Mandatory Palestine
- Died: 11 January 2014 (aged 85) Ramat Gan, Israel
- Party: Liberal (1973–1974); Shlomtzion (1977); Likud (1977–2005); Kadima (from 2005)
- Spouses: Margalit Zimmerman (m. 1953; died 1962) Lily Zimmerman (m. 1963; died 2000)
- Children: 3
- Education: Hebrew University; Tel Aviv University
- Profession: Military officer

Military service
- Branch/service: Haganah; Israel Defense Forces
- Years of service: 1948–1974
- Rank: Aluf (major general)
- Unit: Paratroopers Brigade; Unit 101; Golani Brigade
- Commands: Southern Command; Paratroopers Brigade; Unit 101; Golani Brigade
- Battles/wars: 1947–1949 Palestine war; Reprisal operations; Suez Crisis; Six-Day War; Yom Kippur War
- n.b. Ehud Olmert served as acting prime minister from 4 January 2006 n.b. De facto until 31 July 2000, when the position of the Leader of the Opposition was officially created.

Ariel "Arik" Sharon (Hebrew: אֲרִיאֵל "אָרִיק" שָׁרוֹן, [aʁiˈ(ʔ)el ʃaˈʁon]; 26 February 1928 – 11 January 2014) was an Israeli general and politician who served as the prime minister of Israel from March 2001 until April 2006.

Born in Kfar Malal in Mandatory Palestine to Jewish immigrants from the Russian Empire, he rose in the ranks of the Israeli Army from its creation in 1948, participating in the 1948 Palestine war as platoon commander of the Alexandroni Brigade and taking part in several battles. Sharon became an instrumental figure in the creation of Unit 101 and the reprisal operations, including the 1953 Qibya massacre, as well as in the 1956 Suez Crisis, the Six-Day War of 1967, the War of Attrition, and the Yom-Kippur War of 1973. Yitzhak Rabin called Sharon "the greatest field commander in our history". Upon leaving the military, Sharon entered politics, joining the Likud party, and served in a number of ministerial posts in Likud-led governments from 1977 to 1992 and 1996 to 1999. As Minister of Defense, he directed the 1982 Lebanon War. An official enquiry found that he bore "personal responsibility for ignoring the danger of bloodshed and revenge" before the Sabra and Shatila massacre of Palestinian refugees, for which he became known as the "Butcher of Beirut" among Arabs. He was subsequently removed as defense minister.

From the 1970s through to the 1990s, Sharon championed construction of Israeli settlements in the Israeli-occupied West Bank and Gaza Strip. He became the leader of the Likud in 1999, and in 2000, amid campaigning for the 2001 prime ministerial election, made a controversial visit to the Al-Aqsa complex on the Temple Mount, triggering the Second Intifada. He subsequently defeated Ehud Barak in the election and served as Israel's prime minister from 2001 to 2006. As Prime Minister, Sharon orchestrated the construction of the Israeli West Bank barrier from 2002 to 2003 and Israel's unilateral disengagement from the Gaza Strip in 2005. Facing stiff opposition to the latter policy within the Likud, in November 2005 he left Likud to form a new party, Kadima. He had been expected to win the next election and was widely interpreted as planning on "clearing Israel out of most of the West Bank", in a series of unilateral withdrawals. Following a stroke on 4 January 2006, Sharon remained in a permanent vegetative state until his death in 2014.

Sharon remains a highly polarizing figure in Middle Eastern history. Most Israelis revere Sharon as a war hero and statesman, whereas Palestinians and Human Rights Watch have criticized him as a war criminal, with the latter lamenting that he was never held accountable.

== Early life and education ==
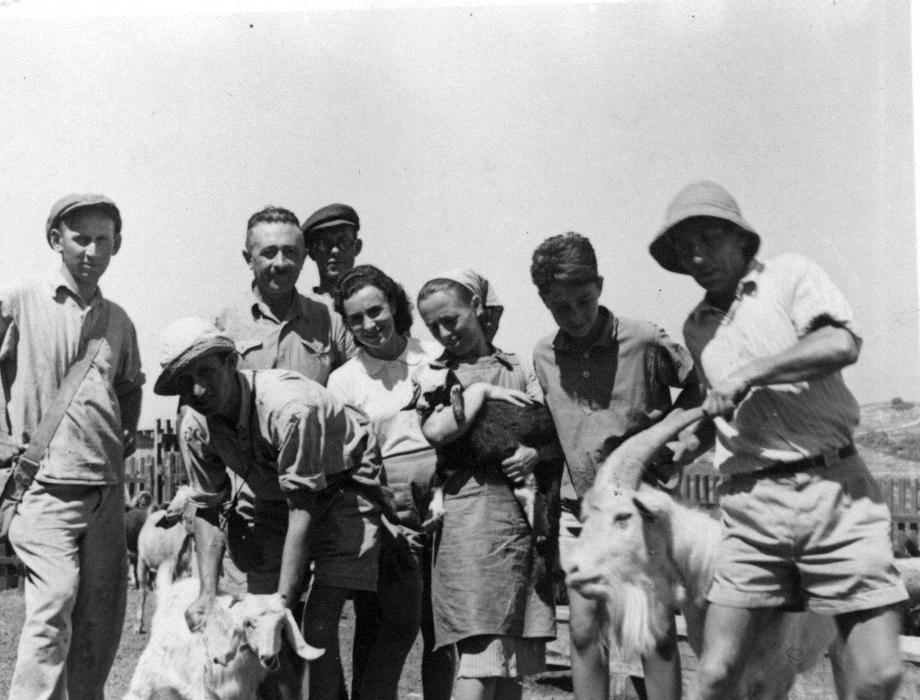
Ariel Sharon at age 14 (second from right)

Ariel (Arik) Scheinerman (later Sharon) was born in Kfar Malal, an agricultural moshav, then in Mandatory Palestine, to Shmuel Scheinerman (1896–1956) of Brest-Litovsk (now Brest, Belarus) and Vera (née Schneirov) Scheinerman (1900–1988) of Mogilev (also Belarus). His parents met while at university in Tiflis (now Tbilisi, Republic of Georgia), where Sharon's father was studying agronomy and his mother was studying medicine. They immigrated to Mandatory Palestine in 1922 in the wake of the Russian Communist government's growing persecution of Jews in the region. In Palestine, Vera Scheinerman went by the name Dvora.

The family arrived with the Third Aliyah and settled in Kfar Malal, a socialist, secular community. (Ariel Sharon himself would remain proudly secular throughout his life.) Although his parents were Mapai supporters, they did not always accept communal consensus: "The Scheinermans' eventual ostracism ... followed the 1933 Arlozorov murder when Dvora and Shmuel refused to endorse the Labor movement's anti-Revisionist calumny and participate in Bolshevik-style public revilement rallies, then the order of the day. Retribution was quick to come. They were expelled from the local health-fund clinic and village synagogue. The cooperative's truck wouldn't make deliveries to their farm nor collect produce."

Sharon spoke both Hebrew and Russian.

Four years after their arrival at Kfar Malal, the Sheinermans had a daughter, Yehudit (Dita). Ariel was born two years later. At age 10, he joined the youth movement HaNoar HaOved VeHaLomed. He was gifted a dagger by his father for his bar mitzvah. As a teenager, he began to take part in the armed night-patrols of his moshav. In 1942 at the age of 14, Sharon joined the Gadna, a paramilitary youth battalion, and later the Haganah, the underground paramilitary force and the Jewish military precursor to the Israel Defense Forces (IDF).

== Military career ==
=== Battle for Jerusalem and 1948 Arab—Israeli War ===
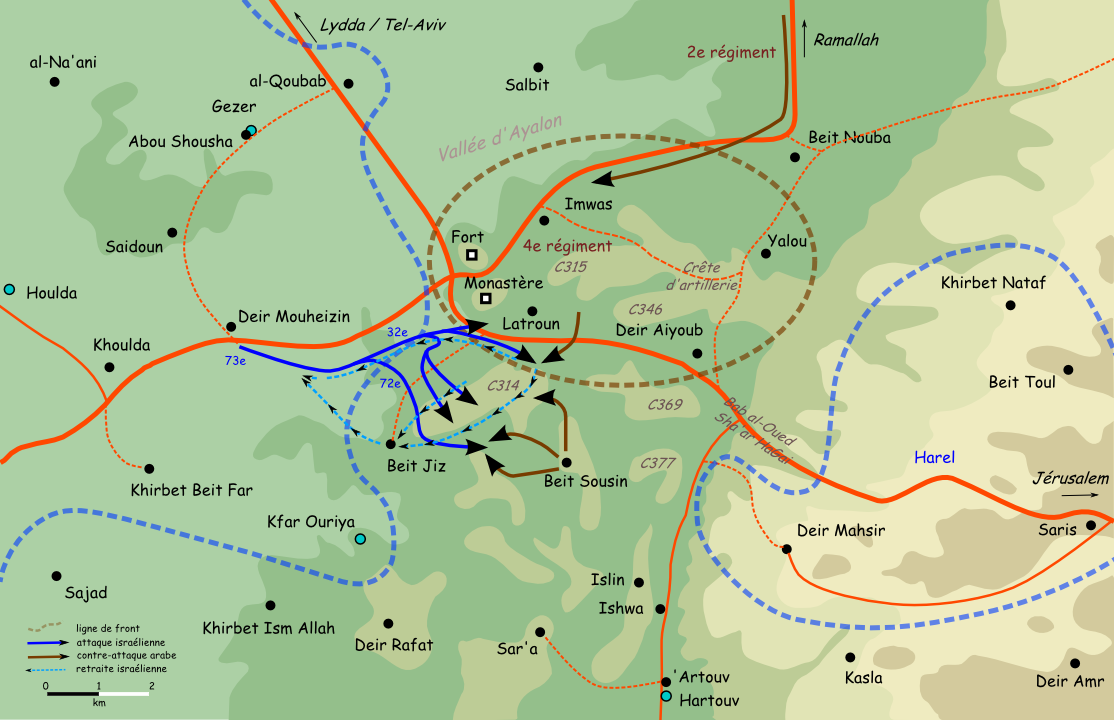
Operation Bin Nun (24–25 May 1948), during which Sharon was shot in the stomach, foot and groin.

Sharon's unit of the Haganah became engaged in serious and continuous combat from the autumn of 1947, with the onset of the Battle for Jerusalem. Without the manpower to hold the roads, his unit took to making offensive hit-and-run raids on Arab forces in the vicinity of Kfar Malal. In units of thirty men, they would hit constantly at Arab villages, bridges and bases, as well as ambush the traffic between Arab villages and bases.

Sharon wrote in his autobiography: "We had become skilled at finding our way in the darkest nights and gradually we built up the strength and endurance these kind of operations required. Under the stress of constant combat we drew closer to one another and began to operate not just as a military unit but almost as a family. ... [W]e were in combat almost every day. Ambushes and battles followed each other until they all seemed to run together."

For his role in a night-raid on Iraqi forces at Bir Adas, Sharon was made a platoon commander in the Alexandroni Brigade. Following the Israeli Declaration of Independence and the onset of the War of Independence, his platoon fended off the Iraqi advance at Kalkiya. Sharon was regarded as a hardened and aggressive soldier, swiftly moving up the ranks during the war. He was shot in the groin, stomach and foot by the Jordanian Arab Legion in the First Battle of Latrun, an unsuccessful attempt to relieve the besieged Jewish community of Jerusalem. Sharon wrote of the casualties in the "horrible battle," and his brigade suffered 139 deaths.

Jordanian field marshal Habis Majali said that Sharon was among 6 Israeli soldiers captured by the Jordanian 4th battalion during the battle, and that Majali took them to a camp in Mafraq and the 6 were later traded back. Sharon denied the claims, but Majali was adamant. "Sharon is like a grizzly bear," he assured. "I captured him for 9 days, I healed his wounds and released him due to his insignificance." A few fellow high-ranking Jordanian officers testified in favour of his account." In 1994 and during the peace treaty signing ceremony with Jordan, Sharon wanted to get in touch with his former captor, but the latter determinedly refused to discuss the incident publicly.

After recovering from the wounds received at Latrun, he resumed command of his patrol unit. On 28 December 1948, his platoon attempted to break through an Egyptian stronghold in Iraq-El-Manshia. At about this time, Israeli founding father David Ben-Gurion gave him the Hebraized name "Sharon". In September 1949, Sharon was promoted to company commander (of the Golani Brigade's reconnaissance unit) and in 1950 to intelligence officer for Central Command. He then took leave to begin studies in history and Middle Eastern culture at the Hebrew University of Jerusalem. Sharon's subsequent military career would be characterized by insubordination, aggression and disobedience, but also brilliance as a commander.

=== Unit 101 ===
A year and a half later, on the direct orders of the Prime Minister, Sharon returned to active service in the rank of major, as the founder and commander of the new Unit 101, a special forces unit tasked with reprisal operations in response to Palestinian fedayeen attacks. The first Israeli commando unit, Unit 101 specialized in offensive guerrilla warfare in enemy countries. The unit consisted of 50 men, mostly former paratroopers and Unit 30 personnel. They were armed with non-standard weapons and tasked with carrying out special reprisals across the state's borders—mainly establishing small unit maneuvers, activation and insertion tactics. Training included engaging enemy forces across Israel's borders. Israeli historian Benny Morris describes Unit 101:

The new recruits began a harsh regimen of day and night training, their orientation and navigation exercises often taking them across the border; encounters with enemy patrols or village watchmen were regarded as the best preparation for the missions that lay ahead. Some commanders, such as Baum and Sharon, deliberately sought firefights.

— Benny Morris, Israel's Border Wars

Unit 101 undertook a series of raids against Jordan, which then held the West Bank. The raids also helped bolster Israeli morale and convince Arab states that the fledgling nation was capable of long-range military action. Known for raids against Arab civilians and military targets, the unit is held responsible for the widely condemned Qibya massacre in October 1953. After a group of Palestinians used Qibya as a staging point for a fedayeen attack in Yehud that killed a Jewish woman and her two children in Israel, Unit 101 retaliated on the village. By various accounts of the ensuing attack, 65 to 70 Palestinian civilians, half of them women and children, were killed when Sharon's troops dynamited 45 houses and a school.

Facing international condemnation for the attack, Ben-Gurion denied that the Israeli military was involved. Describing the intent of the attack, Sharon said "The orders were clear. Qibya was to be a lesson," and that "I was to inflict as many casualties as I could on the Arab home guard." In his memoir, Sharon wrote that the unit had checked all the houses before detonating the explosives and that he thought the houses were empty. Although he admitted the results were tragic, Sharon defended the attack, however: "Now people could feel that the terrorist gangs would think twice before striking, now that they knew for sure they would be hit back. Kibbya also put the Jordanian and Egyptian governments on notice that if Israel was vulnerable, so were they."

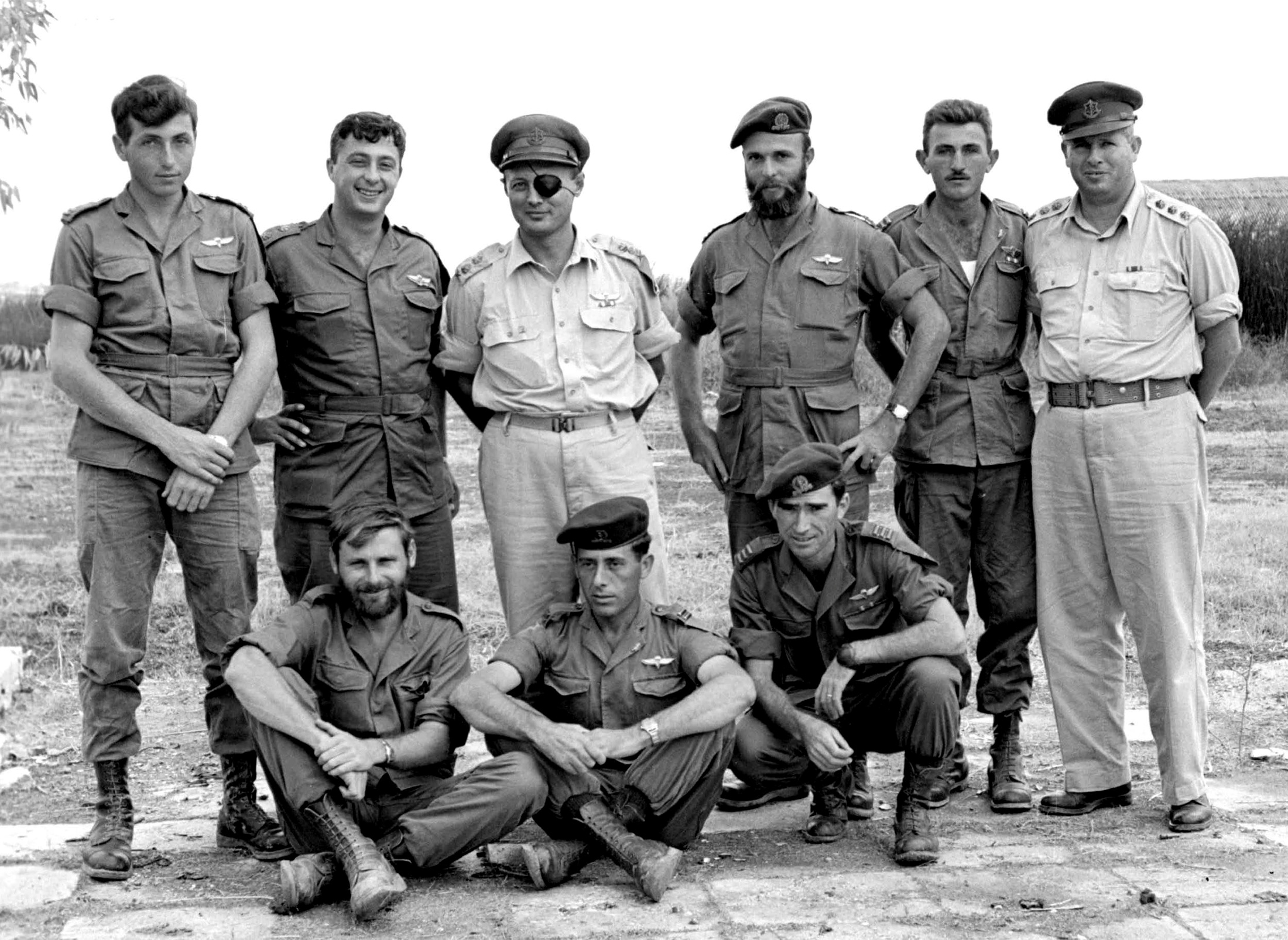
Sharon, top second from left, with members of Unit 101 after Operation Egged (November 1955). Standing l to r: Lt. Meir Har-Zion, Maj. Arik Sharon, Lt. Gen Moshe Dayan, Capt. Dani Matt, Lt. Moshe Efron, Maj. Gen Asaf Simchoni; on ground, l to r: Capt. Aharon Davidi, Lt. Ya'akov Ya'akov, Capt. Raful Eitan

A few months after its founding, Unit 101 was merged with the 890 Paratroopers Battalion to create the Paratroopers Brigade, of which Sharon would also later become commander. Like Unit 101, it continued raids into Arab territory, culminating with the attack on the Qalqilyah police station in the autumn of 1956.

Leading up to the Suez War, the missions Sharon took part in included:

- Operation Shoshana (now known as the Qibya massacre)
- Operation Black Arrow
- Operation Elkayam
- Operation Egged
- Operation Olive Leaves
- Operation Volcano
- Operation Gulliver (מבצע גוליבר)
- Operation Lulav (מבצע לולב)

During a payback operation in the Deir al-Balah refugee camp in the Gaza Strip, Sharon was again wounded by gunfire, this time in the leg. Incidents such as those involving Meir Har-Zion, along with many others, contributed to the tension between Prime Minister Moshe Sharett, who often opposed Sharon's raids, and Moshe Dayan, who had become increasingly ambivalent in his feelings towards Sharon. Later in the year, Sharon was investigated and tried by the Military Police for disciplining one of his subordinates. However, the charges were dismissed before the onset of the Suez War.

=== 1956 Suez War ===
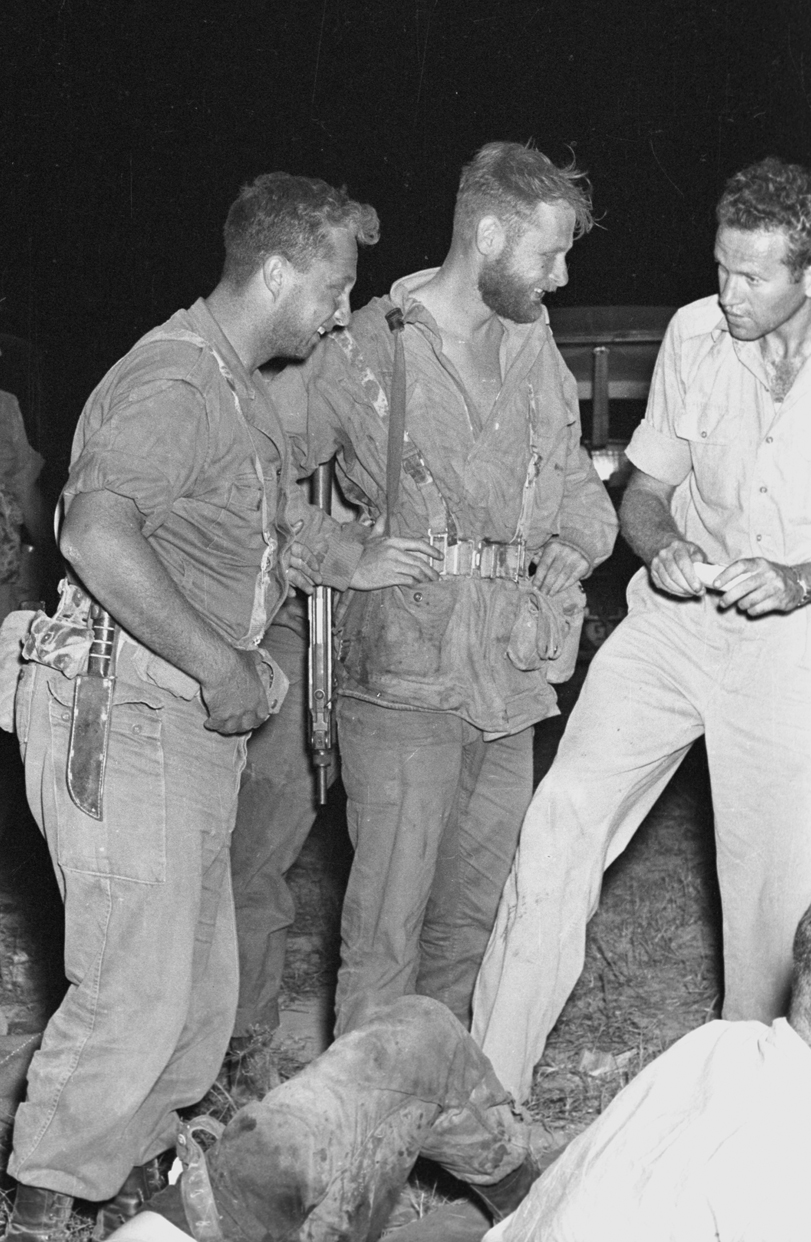
Sharon (left), armed with Ka-Bar combat knife, stands with other paratroop commandos, before Operation Olive Leaves, 1955.

Sharon commanded Unit 202 (the Paratroopers Brigade) during the 1956 Suez War (the British "Operation Musketeer"), leading the troop to take the ground east of the Sinai's Mitla Pass and eventually the pass itself against the advice of superiors, suffering heavy Israeli casualties in the process. Having successfully carried out the first part of his mission (joining a battalion parachuted near Mitla with the rest of the brigade moving on ground), Sharon's unit was deployed near the pass. Neither reconnaissance aircraft nor scouts reported enemy forces inside the Mitla Pass. Sharon, whose forces were initially heading east, away from the pass, reported to his superiors that he was increasingly concerned with the possibility of an enemy thrust through the pass, which could attack his brigade from the flank or the rear.

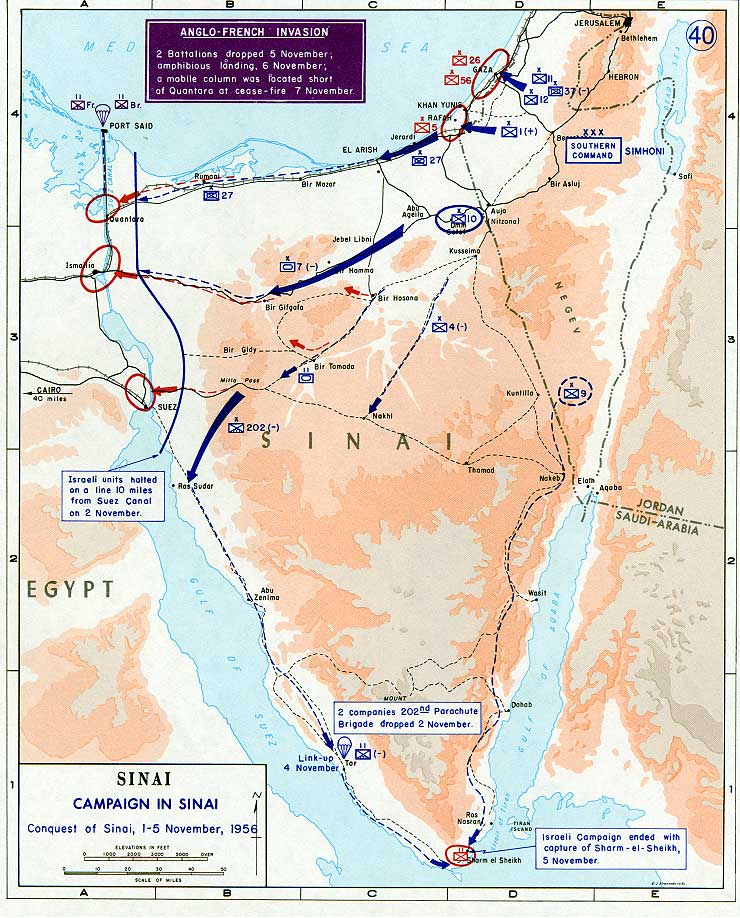
1956 Israeli conquest of Sinai

Sharon asked for permission to attack the pass several times, but his requests were denied, though he was allowed to check its status so that if the pass was empty, he could receive permission to take it later. Sharon sent a small scout force, which was met with heavy fire and became bogged down due to vehicle malfunction in the middle of the pass. Sharon ordered the rest of his troops to attack to aid their comrades. Sharon was criticized by his superiors and was damaged by allegations several years later made by several former subordinates, who claimed that Sharon tried to provoke the Egyptians and sent out the scouts in bad faith, ensuring that a battle would ensue.

Sharon had assaulted Themed in a dawn attack, and had stormed the town with his armor through the Themed Gap. Sharon routed the Sudanese police company, and captured the settlement. On his way to the Nakla, Sharon's men came under attack from Egyptian MIG-15s. On the 30th, Sharon linked up with Eytan near Nakla. Dayan had no more plans for further advances beyond the passes, but Sharon nonetheless decided to attack the Egyptian positions at Jebel Heitan. Sharon sent his lightly armed paratroopers against dug-in Egyptians supported by aircraft, tanks and heavy artillery. Sharon's actions were in response to reports of the arrival of the 1st and 2nd Brigades of the 4th Egyptian Armored Division in the area, which Sharon believed would annihilate his forces if he did not seize the high ground. Sharon sent two infantry companies, a mortar battery and some AMX-13 tanks under the command of Mordechai Gur into the Heitan Defile on the afternoon of 31 October 1956. The Egyptian forces occupied strong defensive positions and brought down heavy anti-tank, mortar and machine gun fire on the IDF force. Gur's men were forced to retreat into the "Saucer", where they were surrounded and came under heavy fire. Hearing of this, Sharon sent in another task force while Gur's men used the cover of night to scale the walls of the Heitan Defile. During the ensuing action, the Egyptians were defeated and forced to retreat. A total of 260 Egyptian and 38 Israeli soldiers were killed during the battle at Mitla. Due to these deaths, Sharon's actions at Mitla were surrounded in controversy, with many within the IDF viewing the deaths as the result of unnecessary and unauthorized aggression.

=== Six-Day War, War of Attrition and Yom Kippur War ===
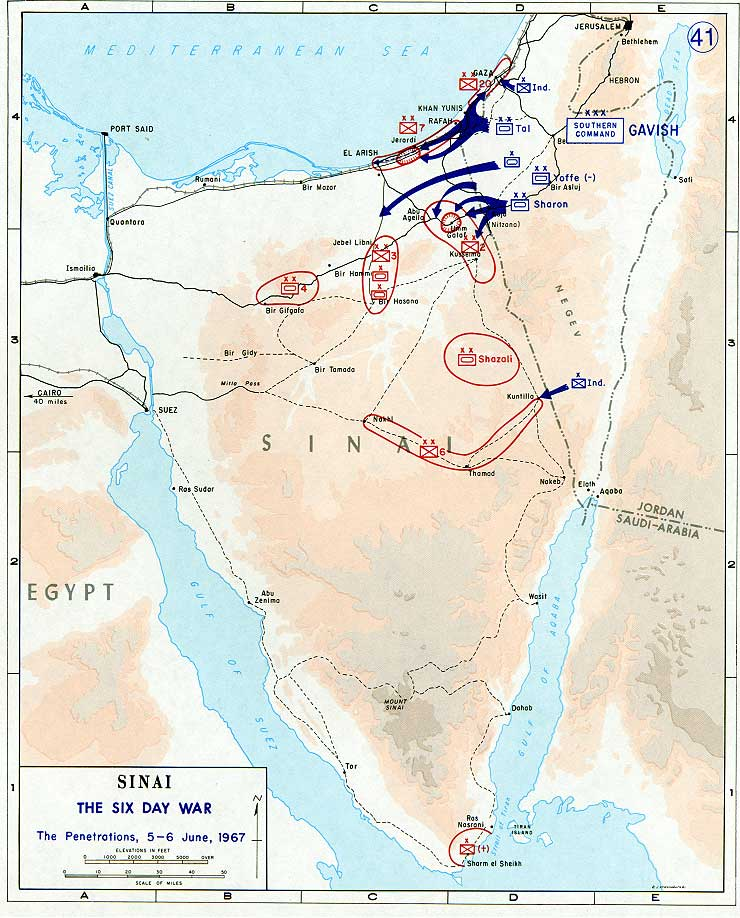
Conquest of Sinai. 5–6 June 1967

"It was a complex plan. But the elements that went into it were ones I had been developing and teaching for many years... the idea of close combat, nightfighting, surprise paratroop assault, attack from the rear, attack on a narrow front, meticulous planning, the concept of the 'tahbouleh', the relationship between headquarters and field command... But all the ideas had matured already; there was nothing new in them. It was simply a matter of putting all the elements together and making them work."

— Ariel Sharon, 1989, on his command at the Battle of Abu-Ageila

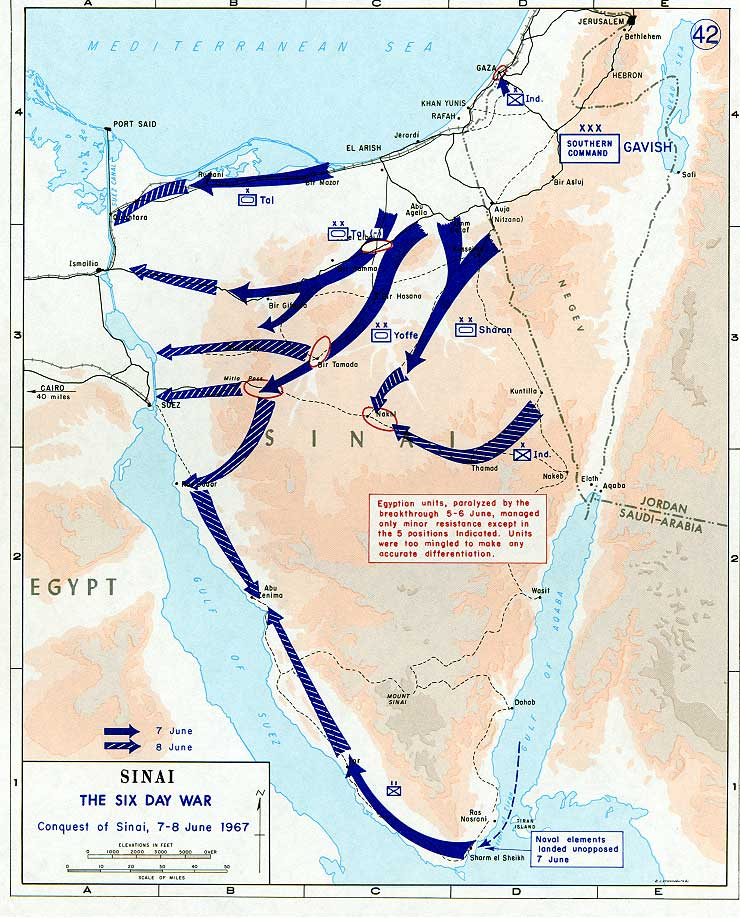
Conquest of Sinai. 7–8 June 1967

The Mitla incident hindered Sharon's military career for several years. In the meantime, he occupied the position of an infantry brigade commander and received a law degree from Tel Aviv University. However, when Yitzhak Rabin became Chief of Staff in 1964, Sharon again began to rise rapidly in the ranks, occupying the positions of Infantry School Commander and Head of Army Training Branch, eventually achieving the rank of Aluf (Major General).

In the Six-Day War, Sharon, in command of an armored division on the Sinai front, drew up his own complex offensive strategy that combined infantry troops, tanks and paratroopers from planes and helicopters to destroy the Egyptian forces Sharon's 319th Division faced when it broke through to the Kusseima-Abu-Ageila fortified area. Sharon's victories and offensive strategy in the Battle of Abu-Ageila led to international commendation by military strategists; he was judged to have inaugurated a new paradigm in operational command. Researchers at the United States Army Training and Doctrine Command studied Sharon's operational planning, concluding that it involved a number of unique innovations. It was a simultaneous attack by a multiplicity of small forces, each with a specific aim, attacking a particular unit in a synergistic Egyptian defense network. As a result, instead of supporting and covering each other as they were designed to do, each Egyptian unit was left fighting for its own life.

According to Sapir Handelman, after Sharon's assault of the Sinai in the Six-Day War and his encirclement of the Egyptian Third Army in the Yom Kippur War, the Israeli public nicknamed him "The King of Israel".

Sharon played a key role in the War of Attrition. In 1969, he was appointed the Head of IDF's Southern Command. As leader of the southern command, on 29 July Israeli frogmen stormed and destroyed Green Island, a fortress at the northern end of the Gulf of Suez whose radar and antiaircraft installations controlled that sector's airspace. On 9 September Sharon's forces carried out Operation Raviv, a large-scale raid along the western shore of the Gulf of Suez. Landing craft ferried across Russian-made tanks and armored personnel carriers that Israel had captured in 1967, and the small column harried the Egyptians for ten hours.

Following his appointment to the southern command, Sharon had no further promotions, and considered retiring. Sharon discussed the issue with Rabbi Menachem M. Schneerson, who strongly advised him to remain at his post. Sharon remained in the military for another three years, before retiring in August 1973. Soon after, he helped found the Likud ("Unity") political party.

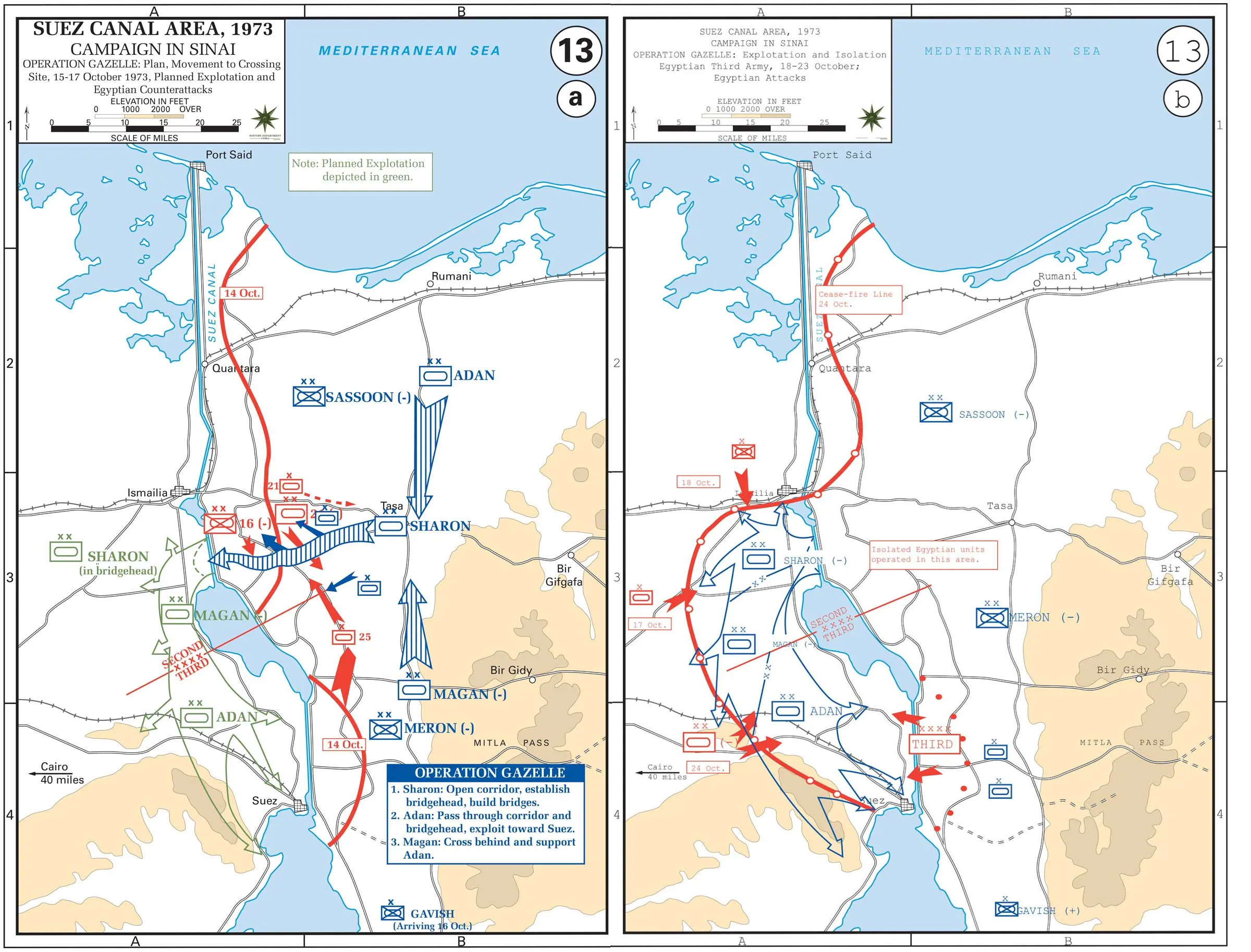
Operation Gazelle, Israel's ground maneuver, encircles the Egyptian Third Army, October 1973

At the start of the Yom Kippur War on 6 October 1973, Sharon was called back to active duty along with his assigned reserve armored division. On his farm, before he left for the front line, the Reserve Commander, Zeev Amit, said to him, "How are we going to get out of this?" Sharon replied, "You don't know? We will cross the Suez Canal and the war will end over there." Sharon arrived at the front, to participate in his fourth war, in a civilian car. His forces did not engage the Egyptian Army immediately, despite his requests. Under cover of darkness, Sharon's forces moved to a point on the Suez Canal that had been prepared before the war. In a move that again thwarted the commands of his superiors, Sharon's division crossed the Suez, effectively winning the war for Israel. He then headed north towards Ismailia, intent on cutting the Egyptian second army's supply lines, but his division was halted south of the Fresh Water Canal.

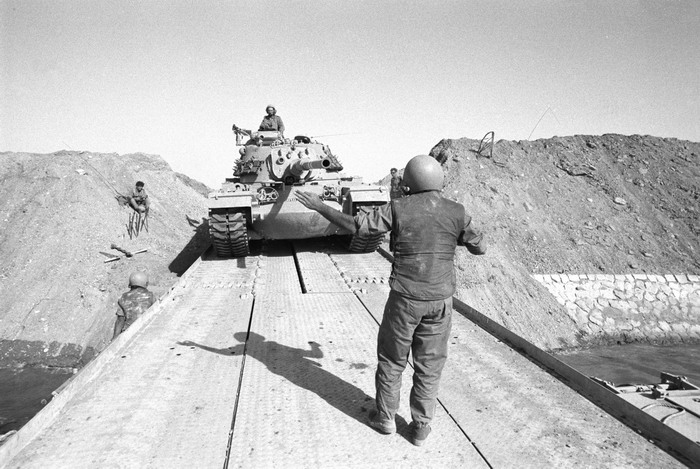
Sharon's 143rd Division, crossing the Suez Canal, in the direction of Cairo, 15 October 1973

Abraham Adan's division passed over the bridgehead into Africa, advancing to within 101 kilometers of Cairo. His division managed to encircle Suez, cutting off and encircling the Third Army. Tensions between the two generals followed Sharon's decision, but a military tribunal later found his action was militarily effective.

Sharon's complex ground maneuver is regarded as a decisive move in the Yom Kippur War, undermining the Egyptian Second Army and encircling the Egyptian Third Army. This move was regarded by many Israelis as the turning point of the war in the Sinai front. Thus, Sharon is widely viewed as the hero of the Yom Kippur War, responsible for Israel's ground victory in the Sinai in 1973. A photo of Sharon wearing a head bandage on the Suez Canal became a famous symbol of Israeli military prowess.

Sharon's political positions were controversial, and he was relieved of duty in February 1974.

=== Bar Lev Line ===
Following Israel's victory in the six-day war, the war of attrition at the Suez Canal began. The Egyptians began firing in provocation against the Israeli forces posted on the eastern part of the canal. Haim Bar Lev, Israel's chief of staff, suggested that Israel construct a border line to protect its southern border. A wall of sand and earth raised along almost the entire length of the Suez Canal would both allow observation of Egyptian forces and conceal the movements of Israeli troops on the eastern side. This line, named after the chief of staff Haim Bar Lev, became known as the Bar Lev Line. It included at least thirty strong points stretching over almost 200 kilometers.

Bar Lev suggested that such a line would defend against any major Egyptian assault across the canal, and was expected to function as a "graveyard for Egyptian troops". Moshe Dayan described it as "one of the best anti-tank ditches in the world." Sharon, and Israel Tal on the other hand, vigorously opposed the line. Sharon said that it would pin down large military formations that would be sitting ducks for deadly artillery attacks, and cited the opinion of Rabbi Menachem M. Schneerson, who explained him "the great military disaster such a line could bring." Notwithstanding, it was completed in spring 1970.

During the Yom Kippur War, Egyptian forces successfully breached the Bar Lev Line in less than two hours at a cost of more than a thousand dead and some 5,000 wounded. Sharon would later recall that what Schneerson had told him was a tragedy, "but unfortunately, that happened".

== Early political career, 1974–2001 ==
=== Beginnings of political career ===
In the 1940s and 1950s, Sharon seemed to be personally devoted to the ideals of Mapai, the predecessor of the modern Labor Party. However, after retiring from military service, he joined the Liberal Party and was instrumental in establishing Likud in July 1973 by a merger of Herut, the Liberal Party and independent elements. Sharon became chairman of the campaign staff for that year's elections, which were scheduled for November. Two and a half weeks after the start of the election campaign, the Yom Kippur War erupted and Sharon was called back to reserve service. On the heels of being hailed as a war hero for crossing the Suez in the 1973 war, Sharon won a seat to the Knesset in the elections that year, but resigned a year later.

From June 1975 to March 1976, Sharon was a special aide to Prime Minister Yitzhak Rabin. He planned his return to politics for the 1977 elections; first, he tried to return to the Likud and replace Menachem Begin at the head of the party. He suggested to Simha Erlich, who headed the Liberal Party bloc in the Likud, that he was more able than Begin to win an election victory; he was rejected, however. He then tried to join the Labor Party and the centrist Democratic Movement for Change, but was rejected by those parties too. Only then did he form his own list, Shlomtzion, which won two Knesset seats in the subsequent elections. Immediately after the elections, he merged Shlomtzion with the Likud and became Minister of Agriculture.

When Sharon joined Begin's government, he had relatively little political experience. During this period, Sharon supported the Gush Emunim settlements movement and was viewed as the patron of the settlers' movement. He used his position to encourage the establishment of a network of Israeli settlements in the occupied territories to prevent the possibility of Palestinian Arabs' return to these territories. Sharon doubled the number of Jewish settlements on the West Bank and Gaza Strip during his tenure.

After the 1981 elections, Begin rewarded Sharon for his important contribution to Likud's narrow win, by appointing him Minister of Defense.

Under Sharon, Israel continued to build upon the unprecedented coordination between the Israel Defense Forces and the South African Defence Force, with Israeli and South African generals giving each other unfettered access to each other's battlefields and military tactics, and Israel sharing with South Africa highly classified information about its missions, such as Operation Opera, which had previously only been reserved for the United States. In 1981, after visiting South African forces fighting in Namibia for 10 days, Sharon argued that South Africa needed more weapons to fight Soviet infiltration in the region. Sharon promised that the relationship between Israel and South Africa would continue to deepen as they work to "ensure the National Defense of both our countries". The collaboration in carrying out joint-nuclear tests, in planning counter-insurgency strategies in Namibia and in designing security fences helped to make Israel, South Africa's closest ally in this period.

=== 1982 Lebanon War and Sabra and Shatila massacre ===
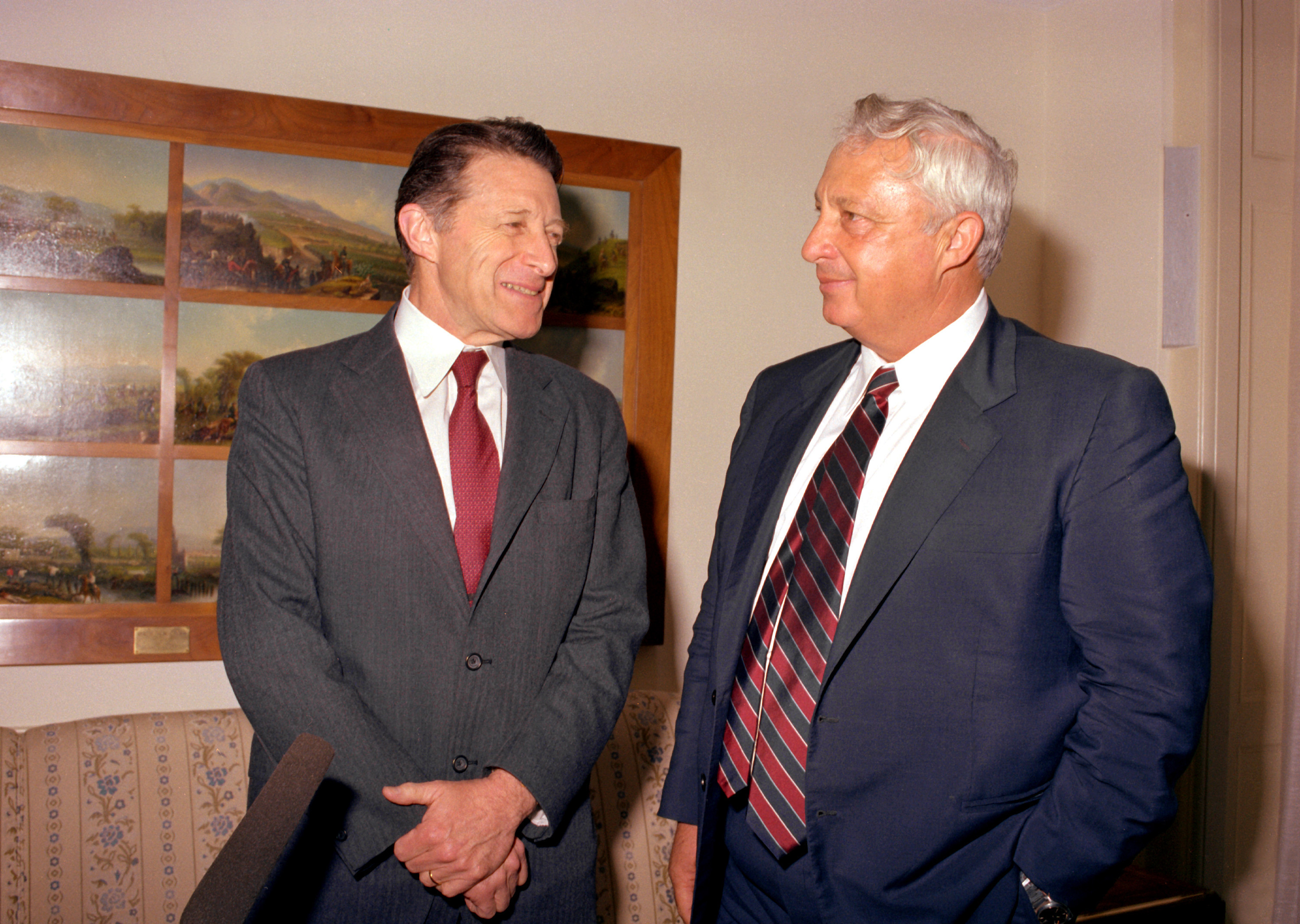
Minister of Defense Sharon (right) with his US counterpart Caspar Weinberger, May 25, 1982

As Defense Minister, Sharon launched an invasion of Lebanon called Operation Peace for Galilee, later known as the 1982 Lebanon War, following the shooting of Israel's ambassador in London, Shlomo Argov. Although this attempted assassination was in fact perpetrated by the Abu Nidal Organization, possibly with Syrian or Iraqi involvement, the Israeli government justified the invasion by citing 270 terrorist attacks by the Palestine Liberation Organization (PLO) in Israel, the occupied territories, and the Jordanian and Lebanese border (in addition to 20 attacks on Israeli interests abroad). Despite the decision of the Israeli cabinet to advance to a line 40 kilometres into Lebanon, and Begin's commitment to American President Ronald Reagan to abide by this plan, Sharon ordered Israeli troops well beyond the initially-approved limits of advance. Sharon intended the operation to eradicate the PLO from its state within a state inside Lebanon, but the war is primarily remembered for the Sabra and Shatila massacre.

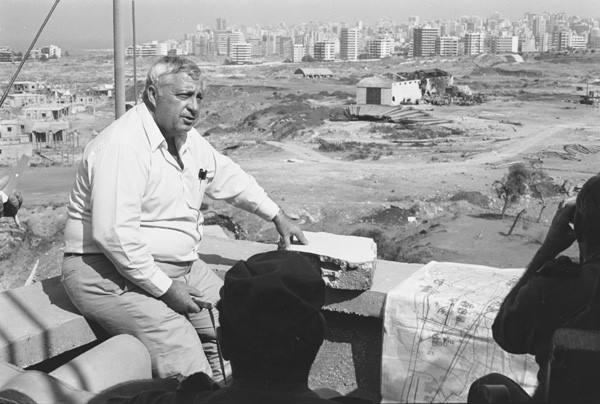
Ariel Sharon and an Israeli army at the gates of Beirut on September 15, 1982, the day before the beginning of the massacre

In a three-day massacre between 16 and 18 September, between 460 and 3,500 civilians, mostly Palestinians and Lebanese Shiites, in the Sabra neighborhood and the adjacent Shatila refugee camp were killed by the Phalanges— Lebanese Maronite Christian militias. Shatila had previously been one of the PLO's three main training camps for foreign terrorists and the main training camp for European terrorists; the Israelis maintained that 2,000 to 3,000 terrorists remained in the camps, but were unwilling to risk the lives of more of their soldiers after the Lebanese army repeatedly refused to "clear them out." The killings followed years of sectarian civil war in Lebanon that left 95,000 dead. The Lebanese army's chief prosecutor investigated the killings and counted 460 dead, Israeli intelligence estimated 700–800 dead, and the Palestinian Red Crescent claimed 2,000 dead. 1,200 death certificates were issued to anyone who produced three witnesses claiming a family member disappeared during the time of the massacre. Nearly all of the victims were men.

The Phalange militia went into the camps to clear out PLO fighters while Israeli forces surrounded the camps, blocking camp exits and providing logistical support. The killings led some to label Sharon "the Butcher of Beirut".

An Associated Press report on 15 September 1982 stated, "Defence Minister Ariel Sharon, in a statement, tied the killing of the Phalangist leader Bachir Gemayel to the PLO, saying 'it symbolises the terrorist murderousness of the PLO terrorist organisations and their supporters'." Habib Chartouni, a Lebanese Christian from the Syrian Socialist National Party confessed to the murder of Gemayel, and no Palestinians were involved.

Robert Maroun Hatem, Hobeika's bodyguard, stated in his book From Israel to Damascus that Phalangist commander Elie Hobeika ordered the massacre of civilians in defiance of Israeli instructions to behave like a "dignified" army. Hatem claimed "Sharon had given strict orders to Hobeika....to guard against any desperate move" and that Hobeika perpetrated the massacre "to tarnish Israel's reputation worldwide" for the benefit of Syria. Hobeika subsequently joined the Syrian occupation government and lived as a prosperous businessman under Syrian protection; further massacres in Sabra and Shatilla occurred with Syrian support in 1985.

The massacre followed intense Israeli bombings of Beirut that had seen heavy civilian casualties, testing Israel's relationship with the United States in the process. America sent troops to help negotiate the PLO's exit from Lebanon, withdrawing them after negotiating a ceasefire that ostensibly protected Palestinian civilians.

==== Legal findings ====
After 400,000 Peace Now protesters rallied in Tel Aviv to demand an official government inquiry into the massacres, the official Israeli government investigation into the massacre at Sabra and Shatila, the Kahan Commission (1982), was conducted. The inquiry found that the Israeli Defense Forces were indirectly responsible for the massacre since IDF troops held the area. The commission determined that the killings were carried out by a Phalangist unit acting on its own, but its entry was known to Israel and approved by Sharon. Prime Minister Begin was also found responsible for not exercising greater involvement and awareness in the matter of introducing the Phalangists into the camps.

The commission also concluded that Sharon bore personal responsibility "for ignoring the danger of bloodshed and revenge [and] not taking appropriate measures to prevent bloodshed". It said Sharon's negligence in protecting the civilian population of Beirut, which had come under Israeli control, amounted to a dereliction of duty of the minister. In early 1983, the commission recommended the removal of Sharon from his post as defense minister and stated:

We have found ... that the Minister of Defense [Ariel Sharon] bears personal responsibility. In our opinion, it is fitting that the Minister of Defense draw the appropriate personal conclusions arising out of the defects revealed with regard to the manner in which he discharged the duties of his office—and if necessary, that the Prime Minister consider whether he should exercise his authority ... to ... remove [him] from office.

Sharon initially refused to resign as defense minister, and Begin refused to fire him. After a grenade was thrown into a dispersing crowd at an Israeli Peace Now march, killing Emil Grunzweig and injuring 10 others, a compromise was reached: Sharon agreed to forfeit the post of defense minister but stayed in the cabinet as a minister without portfolio.

Sharon's resignation as defense minister is listed as one of the important events of the Tenth Knesset.

In its 21 February 1983 issue, Time published an article implying that Sharon was directly responsible for the massacres. Sharon sued Time for libel in American and Israeli courts. Although the jury concluded that the Time article included false allegations, they found that the magazine had not acted with actual malice and so was not guilty of libel.

On 18 June 2001, relatives of the victims of the Sabra massacre began proceedings in Belgium to have Sharon indicted on alleged war crimes charges. Elie Hobeika, the leader of the Phalange militia who carried out the massacres, was assassinated in January 2002, several months before he was scheduled to testify trial. Prior to his assassination, he had "specifically stated that he did not plan to identify Sharon as being responsible for Sabra and Shatila."

=== Support for Iran ===
During the Iran–Iraq War, Israel was one of the main suppliers of military equipment to Iran. The US on the other hand, was officially a staunch supporter of Saddam Hussein. In May 1982, Sharon spoke to NBC News and justified the Israeli position, saying that there was a threat to Iran from the Soviet Union. He opined that the US should not extend even tacit support for Iraq in the conflict. He was further concerned that Iranian success in the conflict had led to four Arab countries forming an Anti-Iraninan alliance, the Gulf Cooperation Council. It later transpired that the US was also selling arms to Iran, in what was to be known as the Iran–Contra affair.

=== Political downturn and recovery ===
"I begin with the basic conviction that Jews and Arabs can live together. I have repeated that at every opportunity, not for journalists and not for popular consumption, but because I have never believed differently or thought differently, from my childhood on. ... I know that we are both inhabitants of the land, and although the state is Jewish, that does not mean that Arabs should not be full citizens in every sense of the word."

— Ariel Sharon, 1989

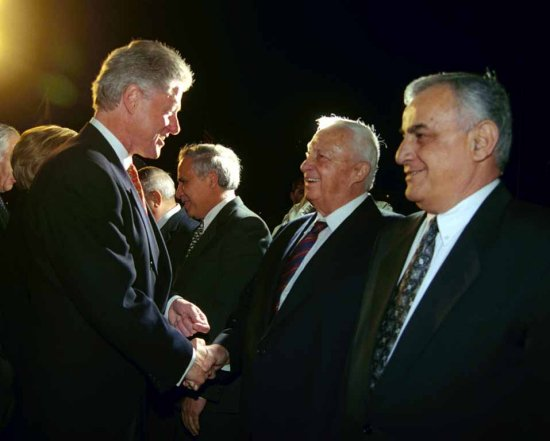
Sharon and Yitzhak Mordechai greeting United States President Bill Clinton in 1998

After his dismissal from the Defense Ministry post, Sharon remained in successive governments as a minister without portfolio (1983–1984), Minister for Trade and Industry (1984–1990), and Minister of Housing Construction (1990–1992). In the Knesset, he was member of the Foreign Affairs and Defense committee (1990–1992) and chairman of the committee overseeing Jewish immigration from the Soviet Union. During this period he was a rival to then prime minister Yitzhak Shamir, but failed in various bids to replace him as chairman of Likud. Their rivalry reached a head in February 1990, when Sharon grabbed the microphone from Shamir, who was addressing the Likud central committee, and famously exclaimed: "Who's for wiping out terrorism?" The incident was widely viewed as an apparent coup attempt against Shamir's leadership of the party.

Sharon unsuccessfully challenged Shamir in the 1984 Herut leadership election and the 1992 Likud leadership election.

In Benjamin Netanyahu's 1996–1999 government, Sharon was Minister of National Infrastructure (1996–98), and Foreign Minister (1998–99). Upon the election of the Barak Labor government, Sharon became the interim leader of the Likud party and subsequently won the September 1999 Likud leadership election.

==== Opposition to the NATO bombing of Yugoslavia ====
Ariel Sharon criticised the NATO bombing of Yugoslavia in 1999 as an act of "brutal interventionism". Sharon said both Serbia and Kosovo have been victims of violence. He said prior to the current Yugoslav campaign against Kosovo Albanians, Serbians were the targets of attacks in the Kosovo province. "Israel has a clear policy. We are against aggressive actions. We are against hurting innocent people. I hope that the sides will return to the negotiating table as soon as possible." During the crisis, Elyakim Haetzni said the Serbs should be the first to receive Israeli aid. "There are our traditional friends," he told Israel Radio." It was suggested that Sharon may have supported the Yugoslav position because of the Serbian population's history of saving Jews during the Holocaust. On Sharon's death, Serbian minister Aleksandar Vulin stated: The Serbian people will remember Sharon for opposing the 1999 NATO bombing campaign against the former Yugoslavia and advocating respect for sovereignty of other nations and a policy of not interfering with their internal affairs.

=== Campaign for Prime Minister, 2000–2001 ===
On 28 September 2000, Sharon and an escort of over 1,000 Israeli police officers visited the Temple Mount complex, site of the Dome of the Rock and Qibli Mosque, the holiest place in the world to Jews and the third holiest site in Islam. Sharon declared that the complex would remain under perpetual Israeli control. Palestinian commentators accused Sharon of purposely inflaming emotions with the event to provoke a violent response and obstruct success of delicate ongoing peace talks. On the following day, a large number of Palestinian demonstrators and an Israeli police contingent confronted each other at the site. According to the U.S. State Department, "Palestinians held large demonstrations and threw stones at police in the vicinity of the Western Wall. Police used rubber-coated metal bullets and live ammunition to disperse the demonstrators, killing 4 persons and injuring about 200." According to the government of Israel, 14 policemen were injured.

Sharon's visit, a few months before his election as Prime Minister, came after archeologists claimed that extensive building operations at the site were destroying priceless antiquities. Sharon's supporters claim that Yasser Arafat and the Palestinian National Authority planned the Second Intifada months prior to Sharon's visit. They state that Palestinian security chief Jabril Rajoub provided assurances that if Sharon did not enter the mosques, no problems would arise. They also often quote statements by Palestinian Authority officials, particularly Imad Falouji, the P.A. Communications Minister, who admitted months after Sharon's visit that the violence had been planned in July, far in advance of Sharon's visit, stating the intifada "was carefully planned since the return of (Palestinian President) Yasser Arafat from Camp David negotiations rejecting the U.S. conditions". According to the Mitchell Report,

the government of Israel asserted that the immediate catalyst for the violence was the breakdown of the Camp David negotiations on 25 July 2000 and the "widespread appreciation in the international community of Palestinian responsibility for the impasse." In this view, Palestinian violence was planned by the PA leadership, and was aimed at "provoking and incurring Palestinian casualties as a means of regaining the diplomatic initiative."

The Mitchell Report found that

the Sharon visit did not cause the Al-Aqsa Intifada. But it was poorly timed and the provocative effect should have been foreseen; indeed, it was foreseen by those who urged that the visit be prohibited. More significant were the events that followed: The decision of the Israeli police on 29 September to use lethal means against the Palestinian demonstrators.

In addition, the report stated,

Accordingly, we have no basis on which to conclude that there was a deliberate plan by the PA [Palestinian Authority] to initiate a campaign of violence at the first opportunity; or to conclude that there was a deliberate plan by the GOI [Government of Israel] to respond with lethal force.

The Or Commission, an Israeli panel of inquiry appointed to investigate the October 2000 events,

criticised the Israeli police for being unprepared for the riots and possibly using excessive force to disperse the mobs, resulting in the deaths of 12 Arab Israeli, one Jewish and one Palestinian citizens.

== Prime Minister (2001–2006) ==
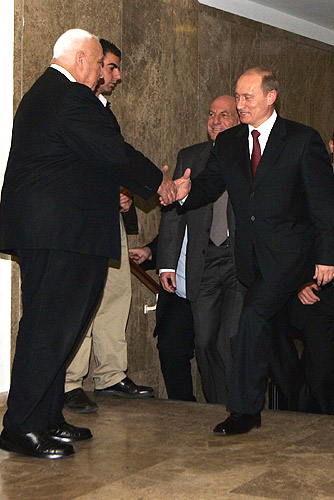
Sharon and President Vladimir Putin meeting in Israel.

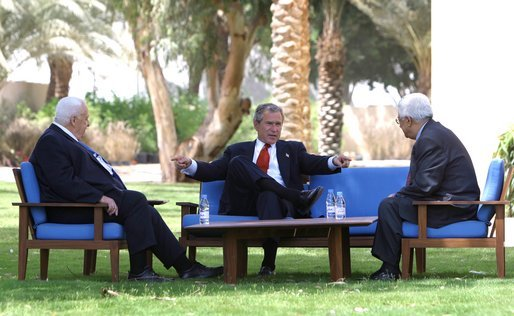
President George W. Bush, center, discusses the Israeli–Palestinian peace process with Prime Minister Ariel Sharon of Israel, left, and Prime Minister of the Palestinian National Authority Mahmoud Abbas in Aqaba, Jordan, 4 June 2003.

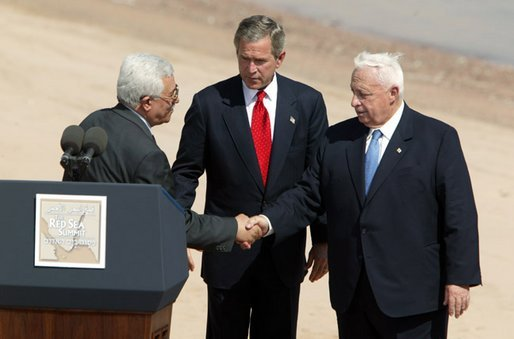
Prime Minister of the Palestinian National Authority Mahmoud Abbas, United States President George W. Bush, and Ariel Sharon, Red Sea Summit, Aqaba, June 2003

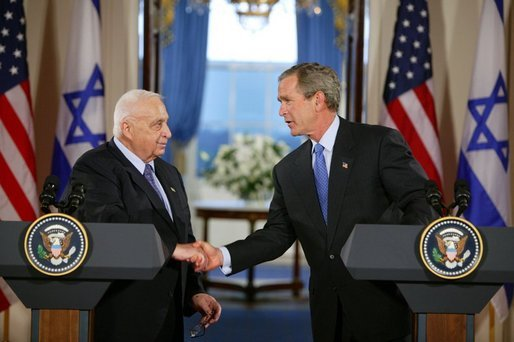
President Bush and Prime Minister Sharon, White House, April 2004

After the collapse of Barak's government, Sharon was elected Prime Minister on 6 February 2001, defeating Barak 62 percent to 38 percent. Sharon's senior adviser was Raanan Gissin. In his first act as prime minister, Sharon invited the Labor Party to join in a coalition with Likud. After Israel was struck by a wave of suicide bombings in 2002 amid the Second Intifada, Sharon launched Operation Defensive Shield, an extensive military operation in the West Bank during which the IDF launched incursions into major Palestinian cities to root out militant activity, as well as a series of targeted assassinations against Palestinian militants. His government also built the West Bank barrier. A survey conducted by Tel Aviv University's Jaffe Center in May 2004 found that 80% of Jewish Israelis believed that the Israel Defense Forces had succeeded in militarily countering the Al-Aqsa Intifada.

The election of the more pro-Russian Sharon, as well as the more pro-Israel Vladimir Putin, led to an improvement in Israel–Russia relations.

In September 2003, Sharon became the first prime minister of Israel to visit India, saying that Israel regarded India as one of the most important countries in the world. Some analysts speculated on the development of a three-way military axis of New Delhi, Washington, D.C., and Jerusalem.

On 20 July 2004, Sharon called on French Jews to emigrate from France to Israel immediately, in light of an increase in antisemitism in France (94 antisemitic assaults were reported in the first six months of 2004, compared to 47 in 2003). France has the third-largest Jewish population in the world (about 600,000 people). Sharon observed that an "unfettered anti-Semitism" reigned in France. The French government responded by describing his comments as "unacceptable", as did the French representative Jewish organization CRIF, which denied Sharon's claim of intense anti-Semitism in French society. An Israeli spokesperson later claimed that Sharon had been misunderstood. France then postponed a visit by Sharon. Upon his visit, both Sharon and French President Jacques Chirac were described as showing a willingness to put the issue behind them.

=== Unilateral disengagement ===
In September 2001, Sharon stated for the first time that Palestinians should have the right to establish their own land west of the Jordan River. In May 2003, Sharon endorsed the Road Map for Peace put forth by the United States, the European Union and Russia, which opened a dialogue with Mahmud Abbas, and stated his commitment to the creation of a Palestinian state in the future.

He embarked on a course of unilateral withdrawal from the Gaza Strip, while maintaining control of its coastline and airspace. Sharon's plan was welcomed by both the Palestinian Authority and Israel's left wing as a step towards a final peace settlement. However, it was greeted with opposition from within his own Likud party and from other right wing Israelis, on national security, military, and religious grounds.

=== Disengagement from Gaza ===
On 1 December 2004, Sharon dismissed five ministers from the Shinui party for voting against the government's 2005 budget. In January 2005, Sharon formed a national unity government that included representatives of Likud, Labor, and Meimad and Degel HaTorah as "out-of-government" supporters without any seats in the government (United Torah Judaism parties usually reject having ministerial offices as a policy). Between 16 and 30 August 2005, Sharon controversially expelled 9,480 Jewish settlers from 21 settlements in Gaza and four settlements in the northern West Bank. Once it became clear that the evictions were definitely going ahead, a group of conservative Rabbis, led by Yosef Dayan, placed an ancient curse on Sharon known as the Pulsa diNura, calling on the Angel of Death to intervene and kill him. After Israeli soldiers bulldozed every settlement structure except for several former synagogues, Israeli soldiers formally left Gaza on 11 September 2005 and closed the border fence at Kissufim. While his decision to withdraw from Gaza sparked bitter protests from members of the Likud party and the settler movement, opinion polls showed that it was a popular move among most of the Israeli electorate, with more than 80 percent of Israelis backing the plans. On 27 September 2005, Sharon narrowly defeated a leadership challenge by a 52–48 percent vote. The move was initiated within the central committee of the governing Likud party by Sharon's main rival, Benjamin Netanyahu, who had left the cabinet to protest Sharon's withdrawal from Gaza. The measure was an attempt by Netanyahu to call an early primary in November 2005 to choose the party's leader.

=== Founding of Kadima ===
On 21 November 2005, Sharon resigned as head of Likud, and dissolved parliament to form a new centrist party called Kadima ("Forward"). November polls indicated that Sharon was likely to be returned to the prime ministership. On 20 December 2005, Sharon's longtime rival Netanyahu was elected his successor as leader of Likud. Following Sharon's incapacitation, Ehud Olmert replaced Sharon as Kadima's leader, for the nearing general elections. Likud, along with the Labor Party, were Kadima's chief rivals in the March 2006 elections.

Sharon's stroke occurred a few months before he had been expected to win a new election and was widely interpreted as planning on "clearing Israel out of most of the West Bank", in a series of unilateral withdrawals.

In the elections, which saw Israel's lowest-ever voter turnout of 64 percent (the number usually averages on the high 70%), Kadima, headed by Olmert, received the most Knesset seats, followed by Labor. The new governing coalition installed in May 2006 included Kadima, with Olmert as Prime Minister, Labor (including Amir Peretz as Defense Minister), the Pensioners' Party (Gil), the Shas religious party, and Israel Beytenu.

=== Alleged fundraising irregularities and Greek island affair ===
During the latter part of his career, Sharon was investigated for alleged involvement in a number of financial scandals, in particular, the Greek island affair and irregularities of fundraising during the 1999 election campaign. In the Greek island affair, Sharon was accused of promising (during his term as Foreign Minister) to help Israeli businessman David Appel in his development project on a Greek island in exchange for large consultancy payments to Sharon's son Gilad. The charges were later dropped due to lack of evidence. In the 1999 election fundraising scandal, Sharon was not charged with any wrongdoing, but his son Omri, a Knesset member at the time, was charged and sentenced in 2006 to nine months in prison.

To avoid a potential conflict of interest in relation to these investigations, Sharon was not involved in the confirmation of the appointment of a new attorney general, Menahem Mazuz, in 2005.

On 10 December 2005, Israeli police raided Martin Schlaff's apartment in Jerusalem. Another suspect in the case was Robert Nowikovsky, an Austrian involved in Russian state-owned company Gazprom's business activities in Europe.

According to Haaretz, "The $3 million that parachuted into Gilad and Omri Sharon's bank account toward the end of 2002 was transferred there in the context of a consultancy contract for development of kolkhozes (collective farms) in Russia. Gilad Sharon was brought into the campaign to make the wilderness bloom in Russia by Getex, a large Russian-based exporter of seeds (peas, millet, wheat) from Eastern Europe. Getex also has ties with Israeli firms involved in exporting wheat from Ukraine, for example. The company owns farms in Eastern Europe and is considered large and prominent in its field. It has its Vienna offices in the same building as Jurimex, which was behind the $1-million guarantee to the Yisrael Beiteinu party."

On 17 December, police found evidence of a $3 million bribe paid to Sharon's sons. Shortly afterwards, Sharon had a stroke.

== Illness, incapacitation and death (2006–2014) ==
"I love life. I love all of it, and in fact I love food."

— Ariel Sharon, 1982

Sharon had been obese since the 1980s, and also had suspected chronic high blood pressure and high cholesterol – at 170 cm (5 ft 7 in) tall, he was reputed to weigh 115 kg (254 lb). Stories of Sharon's appetite and obesity were legendary in Israel. He would often joke about his love of food and expansive girth. His staff car would reportedly be stocked with snacks, vodka, and caviar. In October 2004, when asked why he did not wear a bulletproof vest despite frequent death threats, Sharon smiled and replied, "There is none that fits my size." He was a daily consumer of cigars and luxury foods. Numerous attempts by doctors, friends, and staff to impose a balanced diet on Sharon were unsuccessful.

Sharon was hospitalized on 18 December 2005, following a minor ischemic stroke. During his hospital stay, doctors discovered a heart defect requiring surgery and ordered bed rest pending a cardiac catheterization scheduled for 5 January 2006. Instead, Sharon immediately returned to work and had a hemorrhagic stroke on 4 January. He was rushed to Hadassah Medical Center in Jerusalem. After two surgeries lasting 7 and 14 hours, doctors stopped the bleeding in Sharon's brain, but were unable to prevent him from entering into a coma. Subsequent media reports indicated that Sharon had been diagnosed with cerebral amyloid angiopathy (CAA) during his December hospitalisation. Hadassah Hospital Director Shlomo Mor-Yosef declined to respond to comments that the combination of CAA and blood thinners after Sharon's December stroke might have caused his more serious subsequent stroke.

Ehud Olmert became Acting Prime Minister the night of Sharon's second stroke, while Sharon officially remained in office. Knesset elections followed in March, with Olmert and Sharon's Kadima party winning a plurality. The next month, the Israeli Cabinet declared Sharon permanently incapacitated and Olmert became Interim Prime Minister on 14 April 2006 and Prime Minister in his own right on 4 May.

Sharon underwent a series of subsequent surgeries related to his state. In May 2006, he was transferred to a long-term care facility in Sheba Medical Center. In July of that year, he was briefly taken to the hospital's intensive care unit to be treated for bacteria in his blood, before returning to the long-term care facility on 6 November 2006. Sharon would remain at Sheba Medical Center until his death. Medical experts indicated that his cognitive abilities had likely been destroyed by the stroke. His condition worsened from late 2013, and Sharon suffered from renal failure on 1 January 2014.

After spending eight years in a coma, Sharon died at 14:00 local time (12:00 UTC) on 11 January 2014. Sharon's state funeral was held on 13 January in accordance with Jewish burial customs, which require that interment take place as soon after death as possible. His body lay in state in the Knesset Plaza from 12 January until the official ceremony, followed by a funeral held at the family's ranch in the Negev Desert. Sharon was buried beside his wife, Lily.

== Personal life ==
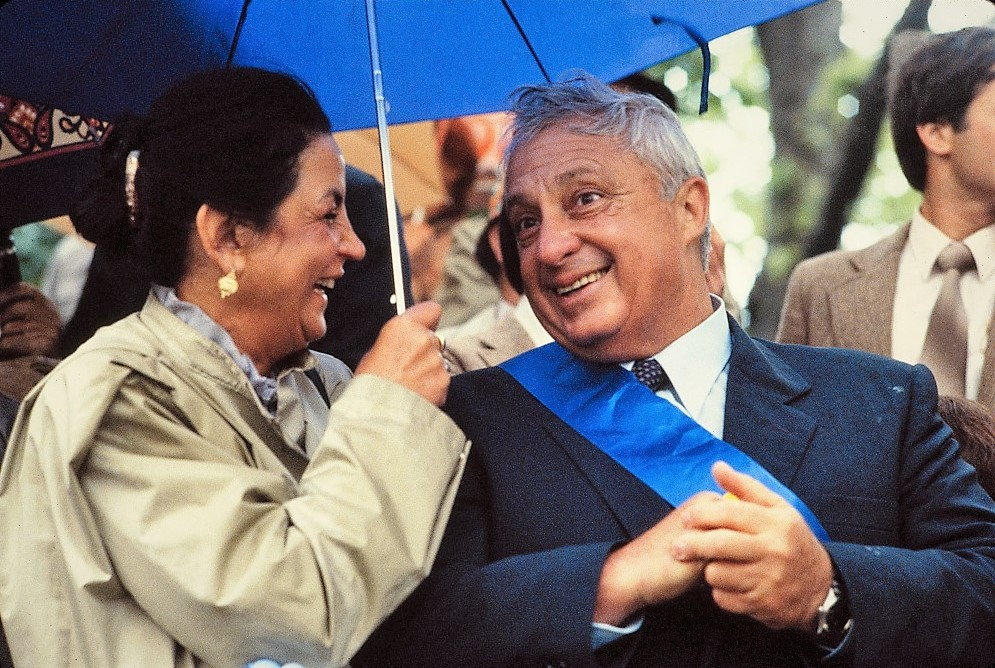
Sharon and wife Lily Sharon in New York in 1974

Sharon was married twice, to two sisters, Margalit and Lily Zimmerman, who were from Romania. Sharon met Margalit in 1947 when she was 16, while she was tending a vegetable field, and married her in 1953, shortly after becoming a military instructor. Margalit was a supervisory psychiatric nurse. They had one son, Gur. Margalit died in a car accident in May 1962 and Gur died in October 1967, aged 11, after a friend accidentally shot him while the two children were playing with a rifle at the Sharon family home. After Margalit's death, Sharon married her younger sister, Lily. They had two sons, Omri and Gilad, and six grandchildren. Lily Sharon died of lung cancer in 2000.

Sharon's sister, Yehudit, known as "Dita", married Shmuel Mandel. In the 1950s, the couple permanently left Israel and emigrated to the United States. This caused a permanent rift in the family. Shmuel and Vera Scheinerman were greatly hurt by their daughter's choice to leave Israel. As a result, Vera Scheinerman willed only a small part of her estate to Dita, an act which enraged her. At one point, Dita decided to return to Israel, but after Vera was informed by the Israel Lands Administration that it would not be legally possible to split the family property between Ariel and Dita, and informed her that she would not be able to build a home there, Dita, believing she was being lied to, cut her family in Israel off and refused to attend the funerals of her mother and sister-in-law. She reestablished contact with the family after Sharon's stroke. Sharon's sister has rarely been mentioned in biographies of him: he himself rarely acknowledged her and only mentioned her twice in his autobiography.

== Legacy ==
A hugely consequential figure, Sharon remains a highly polarizing figure as well. While generally considered a great general and statesman among Israelis, Palestinians and numerous media and political sources revile Sharon as a war criminal. Human Rights Watch has contended that Sharon should have been held criminally accountable for his role in the Sabra and Shatila massacre, and other abuses.

The Ariel Sharon Park, an environmental park near Tel Aviv, is named for him.

In the Negev desert, the IDF is currently building its city of training bases, Camp Ariel Sharon. In total, a NIS 50 billion project, the city of bases is named after Ariel Sharon, the largest active construction project in Israel, it is to become the largest IDF base in Israel.

== Overview of offices held ==
Sharon served as prime minister (Israel's head of government) from 7 March 2001 through 14 April 2006 (with Ehud Olmert serving as acting prime minister beginning 4 January 2006, after Sharon slipped into a coma). As prime minister he led the 12th government during the 15th Knesset and the 13th government during the 16th Knesset.

Sharon served in the Knesset, first for several months in 1973, and later from 1977 through 2006. Sharon. From July 1999 through July 2000, Sharon served as the unofficial/honorary Knesset's opposition leader. Thereafter, from July 2000 through March 2001, he served as the first official designated Knesset opposition leader.

Sharon was the leader of the Shlomtzion party from its 1976 founding until its 1977 merger into Likud. Sharon served as leader of the Likud party from 1999 through 2005, leaving to create Kadima which he led from 2005 through early 2006 (when he fell into a coma).

In addition to these positions and his ministerial roles, Sharon also served as a special aide to Prime Minister Yitzhak Rabin from June 1975 through March 1976.

=== Ministerial posts ===
Ministerial posts
Ministerial post	Tenure	Prime Minister(s)	Government(s)	Predecessor	Successor
Minister of Agriculture	20 June 1977 – 5 August 1981	Menachem Begin	18	Aharon Uzan	Simha Erlich
Minister of Defense	5 August 1981 – 14 February 1983	Menachem Begin	19	Menachem Begin	Menachem Begin
Minister without portfolio	14 February 1983 – 13 September 1984	Menachem Begin (until 10 October 1983); Yitzhak Shamir (from 10 October 1983)	19, 20	—N/a	—N/a
Minister of Industry and Trade	13 September 1984 – 20 February 1990	Yitzhak Rabin (until 20 October 1986); Yitzhak Shamir (from 20 October 1986)	21, 22, 23	Gideon Patt	Moshe Nissim
Minister of Housing and Construction	11 June 1990 – 13 July 1992	Yitzhak Shamir	24	David Levy	Binyamin Ben-Eliezer
Minister of National Infrastructure	8 July 1996 – 6 July 1999	Benjamin Netanyahu	27	Yitzhak Levy	Eli Suissa
Minister of Foreign Affairs (first tenure)	13 October 1998 – 6 June 1999	Benjamin Netanyahu	27	Benjamin Netanyahu	David Levy
Minister of Immigrant Absorption	7 March 2001 – 28 February 2003	Ariel Sharon	29	Yuli Tamir	Tzipi Livni
Minister of Industry and Trade (second tenure)	2 November 2002 – 28 February 2003	Ariel Sharon	29	Dalia Itzik	Ehud Olmert
Minister of Foreign Affairs (second tenure)	2 October 2002 – 6 November 2002	Ariel Sharon	29	Shimon Peres	Benjamin Netanyahu
Minister of Communications	28 February 2003 – 17 August 2003	Ariel Sharon	30	Reuven Rivlin	Ehud Olmert
Minister of Religious Affairs	28 February 2003 – 31 December 2003	Ariel Sharon	30	Asher Ohana	Yitzhak Cohen

== Electoral history ==
=== 2001 direct election for Prime Minister ===
2001 Israeli prime ministerial election
Party	Candidate	Votes	%
Likud	Ariel Sharon	1,698,077	62.38
Labor	Ehud Barak (incumbent)	1,023,944	37.62
Turnout		2,722,021	62.29

=== Party leadership elections ===
1984 Herut leadership election
Candidate	Votes	%
Yitzhak Shamir (incumbent)	407	56.45
Ariel Sharon	306	42.44
Aryeh Chertok	8	1.11
Total votes	721	100

1992 Likud leadership election
Candidate	Votes	%
Yitzhak Shamir (incumbent)		46.4
David Levy		31.2
Ariel Sharon		22.3

September 1999 Likud leadership election
Candidate	Votes	%
Ariel Sharon		53
Ehud Olmert		24
Meir Sheetrit		22
Turnout		34.8%

2002 Likud leadership election
Candidate	Votes	%
Ariel Sharon (incumbent)		55.9
Benjamin Netanyahu		40.1
Moshe Feiglin		3.5
Turnout		46.2%

Political offices
Preceded by Ehud Barak	Prime Minister of Israel; 2001–2006	Succeeded by Ehud Olmert
Party political offices
Preceded by Benjamin Netanyahu	Chairman of Likud; 1999–2005	Succeeded by Benjamin Netanyahu
New title Party founded	Chairman of Kadima; 2005–2006	Succeeded by Ehud Olmert
