= Death and state funeral of Ariel Sharon =

2014 events in Israel

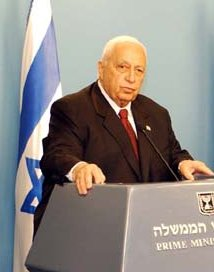
Ariel Sharon

Former Israeli Prime Minister Ariel Sharon died on 11 January 2014. His death received a number of international responses. His state funeral was held on 13 January in accordance with Jewish burial customs.

== Funeral ==
Sharon suffered a hemorrhagic stroke on 4 January 2006, and remained in a long-term care facility in a vegetative state from late 2006 until his death. Sharon died at 14:00 on 11 January 2014.

A state funeral was held on 13 January in accordance with Jewish burial customs, which require that interment takes place as soon after death as possible. Sharon's body lay in state in the Knesset Plaza on 12 January until an official state ceremony attended by dignitaries and world leaders held in the Knesset chamber on 13 January followed by burial at the family's ranch. The prime minister's office issued a statement that announced public viewing 18:00 on 12 January at the Knesset Plaza. Foreign dignitaries who attended the official service included U.S. Vice President Joe Biden, former British Prime Minister Tony Blair, former Dutch Prime Minister Wim Kok, Russian Foreign Minister Sergey Lavrov, Czech Prime Minister Jiří Rusnok and German Foreign Minister Frank-Walter Steinmeier, among others.

== Burial location ==
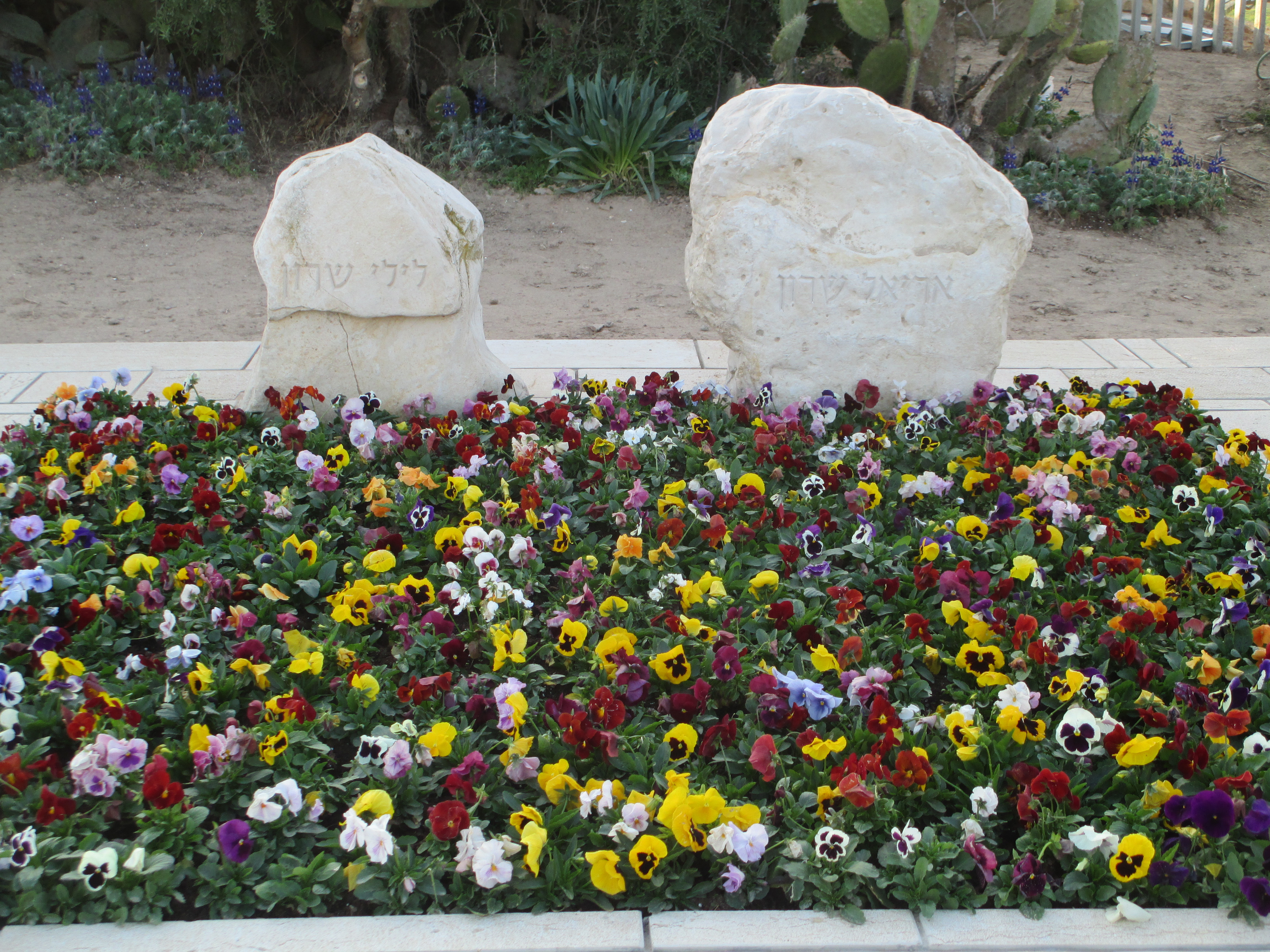
Ariel and Lily Sharon's graves.

Sharon was buried next to his wife, Lily, on the family ranch, Havat Shikmim (Sycamore Ranch) in the Negev Desert. According to author Izzeldin Abuelaish, the Palestinian village of Houg was located there before the establishment of the State of Israel. The property was purchased by Sharon in 1972, who established a 1,000 acre sheep farm there.

In the days after the funeral, many members of the public flocked to the burial site, on Anemone Hill, to pay their last respects.

== Reactions ==
=== Israel ===
Israeli president Shimon Peres, referring to Sharon by his nickname, said:

Arik was a brave soldier and a daring leader who loved his nation and his nation loved him. He was one of Israel's great protectors and most important architects, who knew no fear and certainly never feared vision.

Other Israeli politicians who paid tribute to Sharon included Benjamin Netanyahu, Justice Minister Tzipi Livni, Defence Minister Moshe Ya'alon, and former prime minister Ehud Olmert. Isaac Herzog, leader of the opposition Israeli Labor Party, said: "Ariel Sharon will be remembered as a great leader. For many years we were in opposing camps, but it's impossible not to appreciate a man who could change his worldview and recognize the correct path for the State of Israel."

=== Palestine ===
- Palestine – Leading Palestinian political figure Mustafa Barghouti said that while no one should gloat over his death, Sharon had taken "a path of war and aggression" and had left "no good memories with Palestinians". Hamas rejoiced at the death of a "criminal" who had "hands ... covered with Palestinian blood."

=== International ===
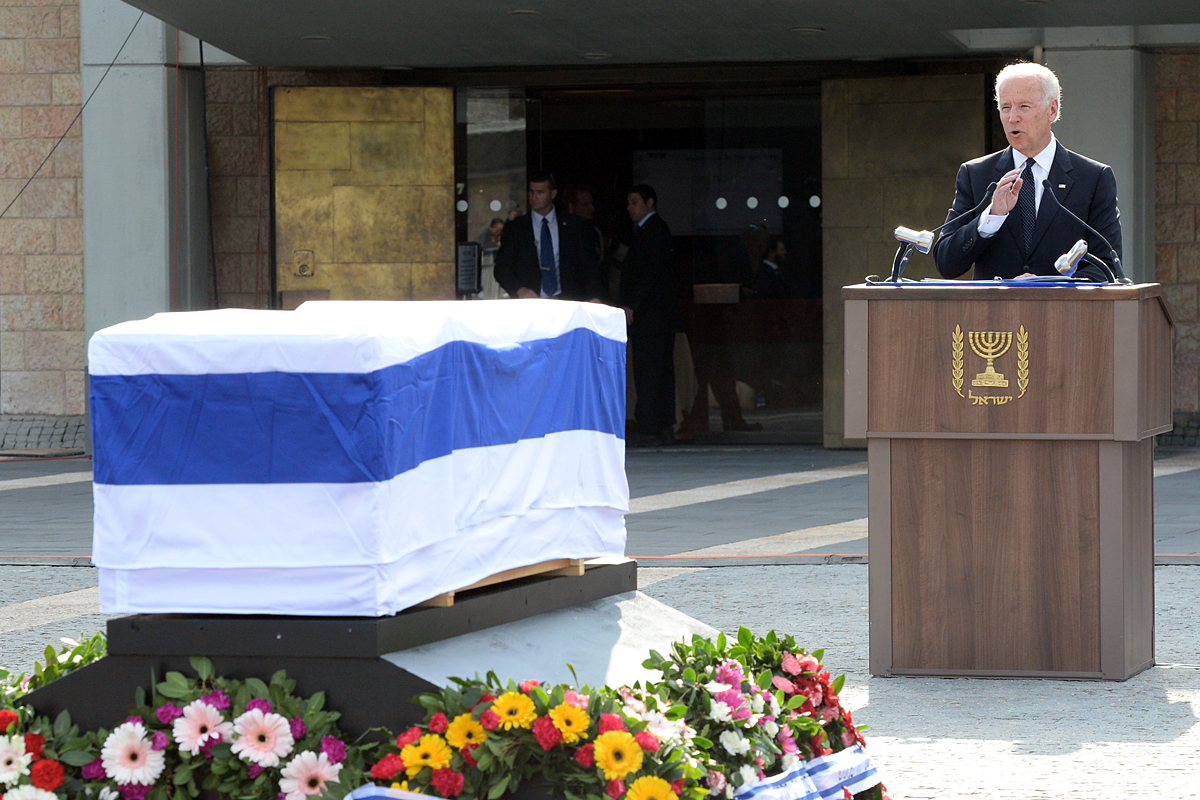
United States Vice President Joe Biden delivers remarks at the State Funeral of Former Israeli Prime Minister Ariel Sharon in Jerusalem on January 13, 2014.

- Australia – A motion of condolence was held in the Parliament of Australia. Foreign Minister Julie Bishop said that "I was honoured to represent the Australian government at a memorial service for Ariel Sharon at the Knesset on 13 January and at his burial service at the Sharon family farm in Negev. I extended our deep condolences to Ariel Sharon's family, to the President and Prime Minister of Israel, and to the Israeli people on the passing of a man who dedicated his life to the nation of Israel."
- Canada – Prime Minister Stephen Harper described Sharon as a "renowned military leader" and added that "he also played a central role in the Israeli government for several years, changing the political landscape through his leadership and vision."
- Colombia – President Juan Manuel Santos lamented the death of Ariel Sharon and expressed condolences to the people of Israel.
- Fiji – Prime Minister Commodore Voreqe Bainimarama praised Ariel Sharon as "someone who placed the security of his nation above all," and who had inspired other countries to seek "innovative solutions that are relevant to their own unique contexts." He also praised him as a fellow military leader, described his death as a "great loss," and offered Fijians' "warmest thoughts and prayers" to Israelis.
- France – President François Hollande remarked Sharon that as "a major player in the history of his country. After [a] long military and political career he chose to move towards the dialogue with Palestine. I am offering my sincere condolences to his family and people of Israel."
- Germany – Chancellor Angela Merkel's office issued a statement that read: "With his courageous decision to withdraw the Israeli settlers from the Gaza Strip, he took a historic step on the path to a deal with the Palestinians and a two-state solution."
- India – Prime Minister Manmohan Singh said, "As Prime Minister, he took bold steps for peace in the region. We in India recall that he was the first-ever Prime Minister of Israel to visit India in September 2003. His lasting contribution to the promotion of our bilateral ties will be long remembered."
  - Chief Minister of Madhya Pradesh, Shivraj Singh Chouhan wrote that it was "Sad to hear about the death of Ariel Sharon, former Israeli prime minister. During his tenure Indo-Israel relations were at positive best."
- Iran – Grand Ayatollah Ali Khamenei wrote on Twitter: "The Zionists' all hopes relied on this vulture (Ariel #Sharon) to bring down the rising nation of Palestine to their knees." And "(Sharon) was their last hope. However, from the first day when he came into power, the #Palestinian Intifada gained in flames."
- Italy – Minister for Foreign Affairs Emma Bonino expressed her condolences on the death of Ariel Sharon to his family and to the people of Israel. Also she said that, "He dedicated his life to the security of the State of Israel. I believe the best instrument for continuing to protect the existence and security of Israel as a democratic Jewish State."
- Mexico – The Secretariat of Foreign Affairs (SRE) lamented the death of Sharon through a communiqué and offered its "sincere condolences" to the Israeli people. It recognized Sharon's long political career.
- Russia – President Vladimir Putin said that he "highly praised Ariel Sharon's personal qualities and his activities to protect Israel's interests, noting a high respect for him among compatriots and his high authority in the international arena."
- Singapore – Prime Minister Lee Hsien Loong expressed his condolences to the people of Israel via Facebook. He wrote that Sharon had dedicated his life to the security and well-being of Israel and its people and that he embodied courage and resourcefulness and served his country with honor and distinction.
- Sweden – Foreign secretary Carl Bildt said that Sharon was "a great leader of Israel; a brilliant military commander, but also a wise statesman seeing the necessity of peace."
- Turkey – Turkish governing party Deputy Chairman Hüseyin Çelik wrote on Twitter: "Even Sharon's death agony lasted eight years." He also said that, "One dies in the way one lives."
- United Kingdom – Prime Minister David Cameron regarded Sharon as "one of the most significant figures in Israeli history....As prime minister he took brave and controversial decisions in pursuit of peace, before he was so tragically incapacitated."
- United States – President Barack Obama wrote, "On behalf of the American people, Michelle and I send our deepest condolences to the family of former Israeli Prime Minister Ariel Sharon and to the people of Israel on the loss of a leader who dedicated his life to the State of Israel. We reaffirm our unshakable commitment to Israel's security and our appreciation for the enduring friendship between our two countries and our two peoples. We continue to strive for lasting peace and security for the people of Israel, including through our commitment to the goal of two states living side-by-side in peace and security." Secretary of State John Kerry said, "Ariel Sharon's journey was Israel's journey. The dream of Israel was the cause of his life, and he risked it all to live that dream."
  - Former President George W. Bush wrote that "I was honored to know this man of courage and call him friend. He was a warrior for the ages and a partner in seeking security for the Holy Land and a better, peaceful Middle East."
