= Ya'akov Avitan =

Israeli rabbi and politician

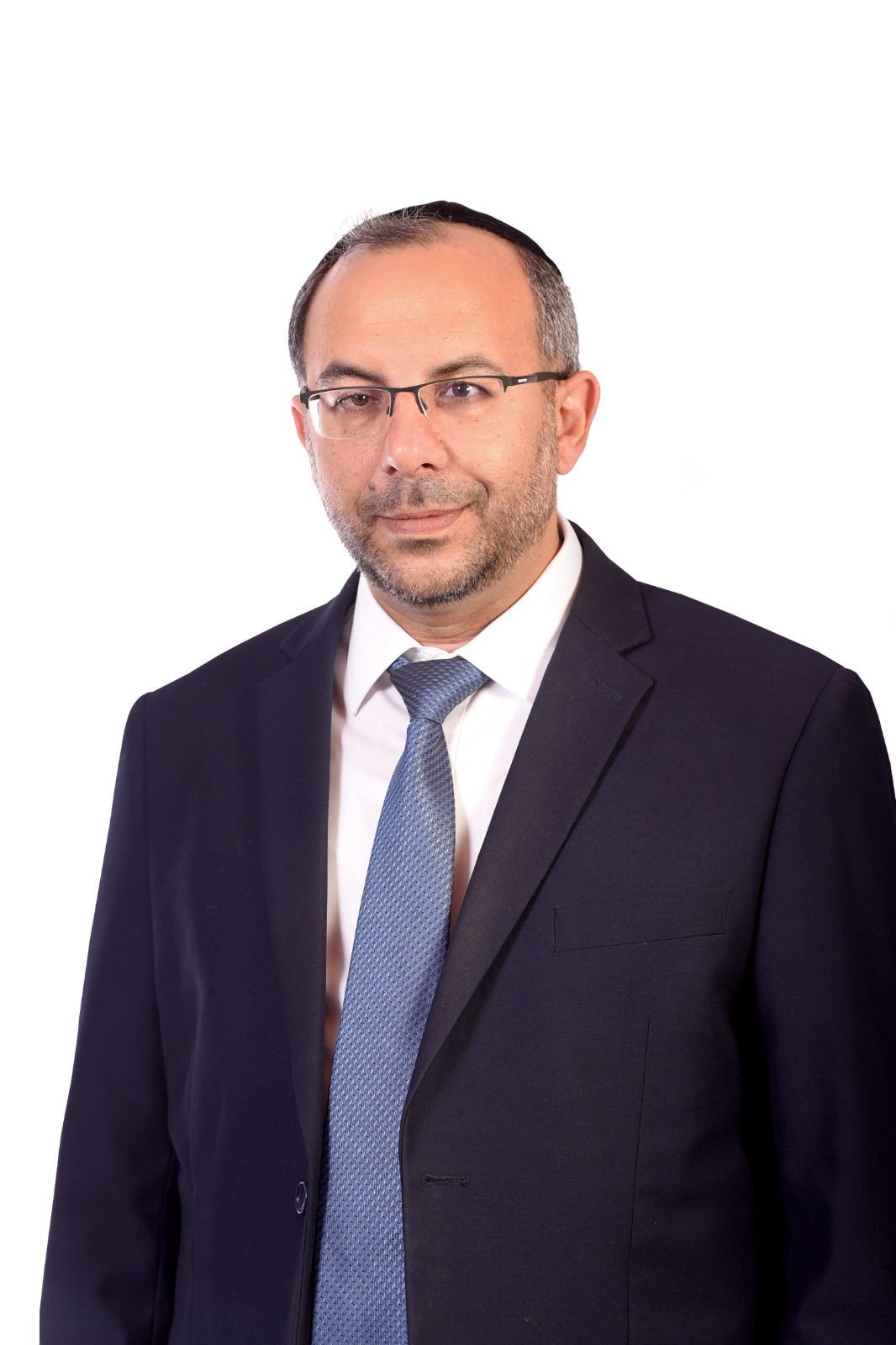

Ministerial roles
- 2020–2021: Minister of Religious Affairs

Personal details
- Born: Ashkelon, Israel

Ya'akov Avitan (Hebrew: יעקב אביטן) is an Israeli rabbi and politician. He served as a Minister of Religious Affairs from 2020 to 2021.

== Political career ==
Avitan was born in Ashkelon, the son of the rabbi of Be'er Tuvia Regional Council. He attended the Ohel Moshe and Kol Yehuda yeshivas in Bnei Brak and was ordained as a rabbi at the age of 19. He was subsequently appointed rabbi of Beit Shikma and later Hof Ashkelon Regional Council.

In 2013 he was asked to head the Ashkelon municipality branch of Shas. After being elected to the city council, he headed the education department. Following the 2018 local elections he was appointed deputy mayor of the city.

Despite not being a member of the Knesset, in May 2020 he was appointed Minister of Religious Affairs.
