= Religious Council (Israel) =

Israeli Municipal Government entities

Religious Councils are Israeli municipal entities responsible for providing Jewish Religious Services on a municipal level. The councils are independent, but are appointed and regulated by Municipal Governments and the Ministry of Religious Services.

== History ==
The initial basis for Religious Councils are the Committees for Kosher Slaugher established by the Jewish Community Regulations, adopted in 1927 by the High Commissioner of Palestine. In 1935, several of the local community countcils established by the Ordinance formed Local Religious Councils to handle the provision of religious services, which were formally codified in a regulation passed in 1937.

Following Israeli Independence in 1948, the Ministry of Religions (later the Ministry of Religious Affairs) was established and assumed responsibility for the Councils. In 1971, The Knesset passed the Jewish Religious Services Act, which remains the legal basis for the operation of Religious Councils.

In 2003, the Ministry of Religious Affairs was abolished and the responsibility for Religious Councils passed to the newly-established National Authority for Religious Services, a department within the Prime Minister's Office. The Department was reformed in 2008 into the Ministry of Religious Services, which assumed responsibility over the Councils.

== Responsibilities ==
Religious Councils are responsible for providing Jewish Religious Services on a municipal level. These include Kashrut inspections, burial services, the registration of marriages, the maintenance of religious institutions (such as synagogues and mikvehs), the employment of a local rabbi and the support of religious activities.

== Structure ==
Religious Councils are appointed at the beginning of every municipal term. 45% of a council's members are appointed by the local municipal council, (Note: Depending on the Local government, this could be a City council, a Local council or a Regional council) 45% are appointed by the Minister of Religious Services, and the remaining 10% are selected by local rabbis. The Size of the Council is determined by the Minister of Religious Services. If any difficulties arise in forming a council, it is instead replaced with two appointees by the Minister of Religious Services. (Note: Per a 2004 amendment to the Jewish Religious Services Act. (Finklestein, 2018, p. 21)) The Council's members select a Chairman, who is responsible for its management. The Chairman is the only salaried member of the council.

The collective budget of all Religious Councils is determined in the national budget, and then apportioned to individual councils by the Ministry of Religious Services. Local municipal governments provide a collective 60% of the Councils' Budgets, while the Ministry of Religious Services provides the remaining 40%. The percentage provided by the ministry varies by locality, and can go as high as 75% for poorer localities and as low as 25% for wealthier localities. Additional funding is provided by the Ministry for individual projects, and Councils receive additional funding through revenue from the services they provide, such as burials and marriages.

The Council's Halachic Authorities are the Local Rabbis.

As of 2018, there are 131 religious councils.

== Controversies ==
In a 2018 Haaretz op-ed, Shuki Friedman of the Israel Democracy Institute advocates for the dissolution of the Religious Councils and their replacement with direct provision of services by local governments. In the op-ed, Friedman claims that Religious Councils are staffed in large part by political appointees on behalf of the Minister of Religious Services, citing the fact that most councils at the time were staffed partly or primarily by ministerial appointments, rather than members selected by the legally-perscribed formula. Friedman argues these appointments have resulted in corruption, overspending and a reduced quality of services.

== Representation ==
=== Women ===
No women were appointed to serve on a religious council until the appointment of Leah Shkadiel to the Yeruham religious council in 1986. Shkadiel's appointment was initially blocked by the Minister of Religious Services, Zevulun Hammer, but a Supreme Court ruling the following year enabled her reappointment in 1988. In 2004, Smadar Gross was appointed head of the Kfar Saba Religious Council, becoming the first woman to lead a Religious Council. The second woman appointed to lead a council was Emek Yizrael's Haya Kliger in 2021.

=== Non-Orthodox Jews ===
In 1997, an Israeli court mandated the appointment of Joyce Brenner, an adherent to Reform Judaism, to the Netanya religious council. Following the ruling, Religious Services Minister Eli Suissa, who was set to leave office as part of a rotation agreement between Shas and the National Religious Party, resigned early in order to allow Prime Minister Benjamin Netanyahu to approve the appointment in his place.

In 1998, the Supreme Court of Israel ruled that the Ministry of Religious Affairs is not allowed to discriminate on the basis of affiliation with a particular Jewish sect, separately ruling that the ministry must approve the appointments of non-orthodox councillors made by municipalities. The following year, The Knesset passed a bill to decrease the size of the councils, which Reform and Conservative rabbis argued was done in part to prevent the appointment of non-orthodox representatives.
