= Yigal Bibi =

Israeli politician (born 1942)

- יגאל ביבי
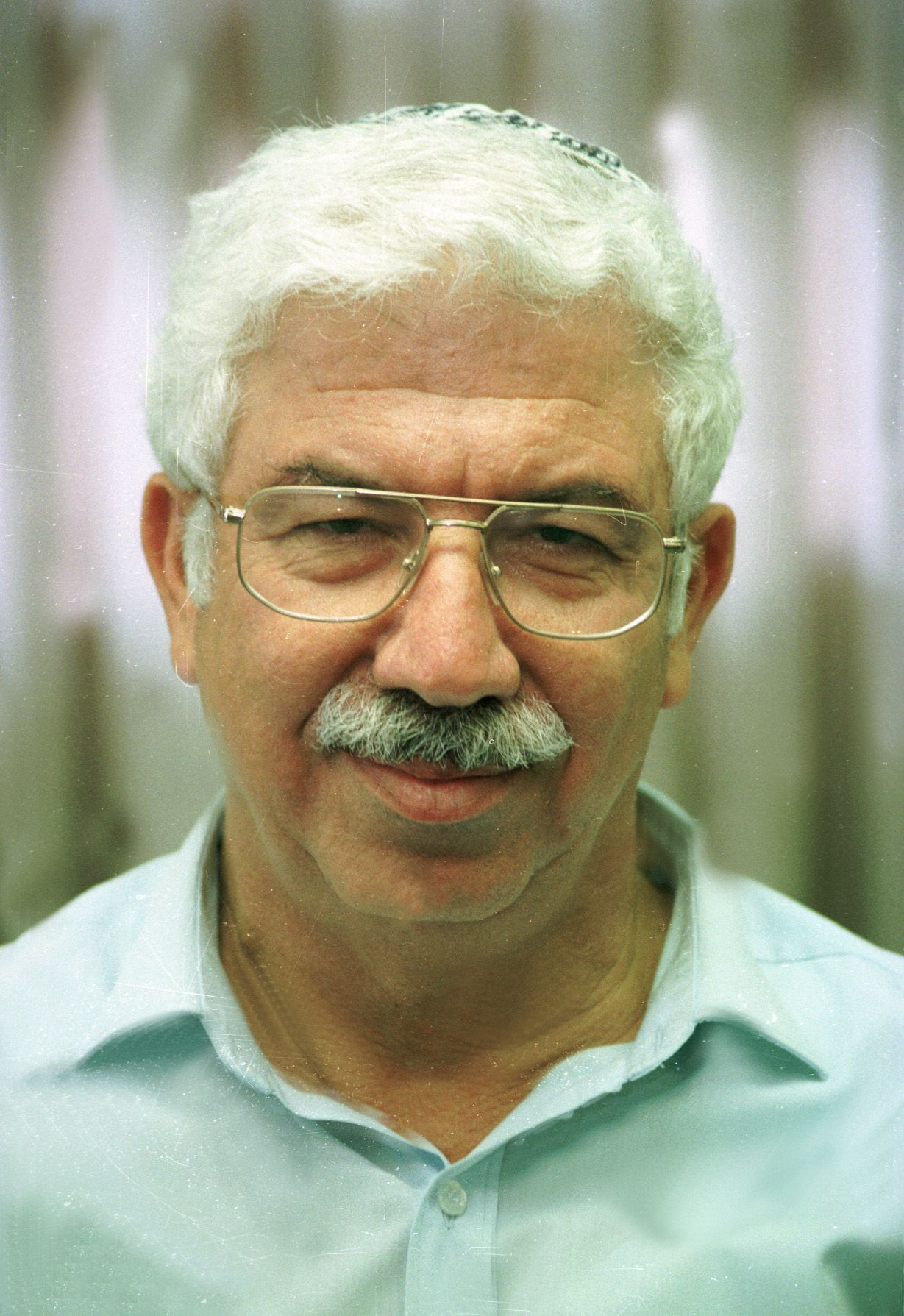
- Bibi in 1996

Faction represented in the Knesset
- 1988–2003: National Religious Party

Personal details
- Born: 21 January 1942 (age 84) Tiberias, Mandatory Palestine

Yigal Bibi (Hebrew: יגאל ביבי; born 21 January 1942) is a former Israeli politician who served as a member of the Knesset for the National Religious Party between 1988 and 2003.

== Biography ==
Born in Tiberias during the Mandate era, Bibi studied at the Bnei Akiva Talmudic College before gaining a BA in political science and Jewish history at Bar-Ilan University. He worked as a teacher.

Bibi served as mayor of his hometown between 1978 and 1988, and was deputy chairman of the Union of Local Authorities. A member of the central institutions of the National Religious Party, he was first elected to the Knesset in 1988. During his first term, he served as Deputy Minister in the Prime Minister's Office (from August 1990 until November 1990) and Deputy Minister of the Environment (from November 1990 until the end of the Knesset term in 1992).

After being re-elected in 1992, Bibi became the party's parliamentary group chairman. He was re-elected again in 1996 and served in Binyamin Netanyahu's government as Deputy Minister in the PM's Office (July to August 1996) and Deputy Minister of Religious Affairs (August 1996 until January 1998, and again from February 1998 until the end of the Knesset term the following year).

For the 1999 elections he was placed fourth on the NRP list, and retained his seat for a third time. He again served as Deputy Minister of Religious Affairs from August 1999 until July 2000.

After winning only eighth spot on the party's list for the 2003 elections, he lost his seat as the party was reduced to six MKs.
