= Aryeh Gamliel =

Israeli politician (1951–2021)

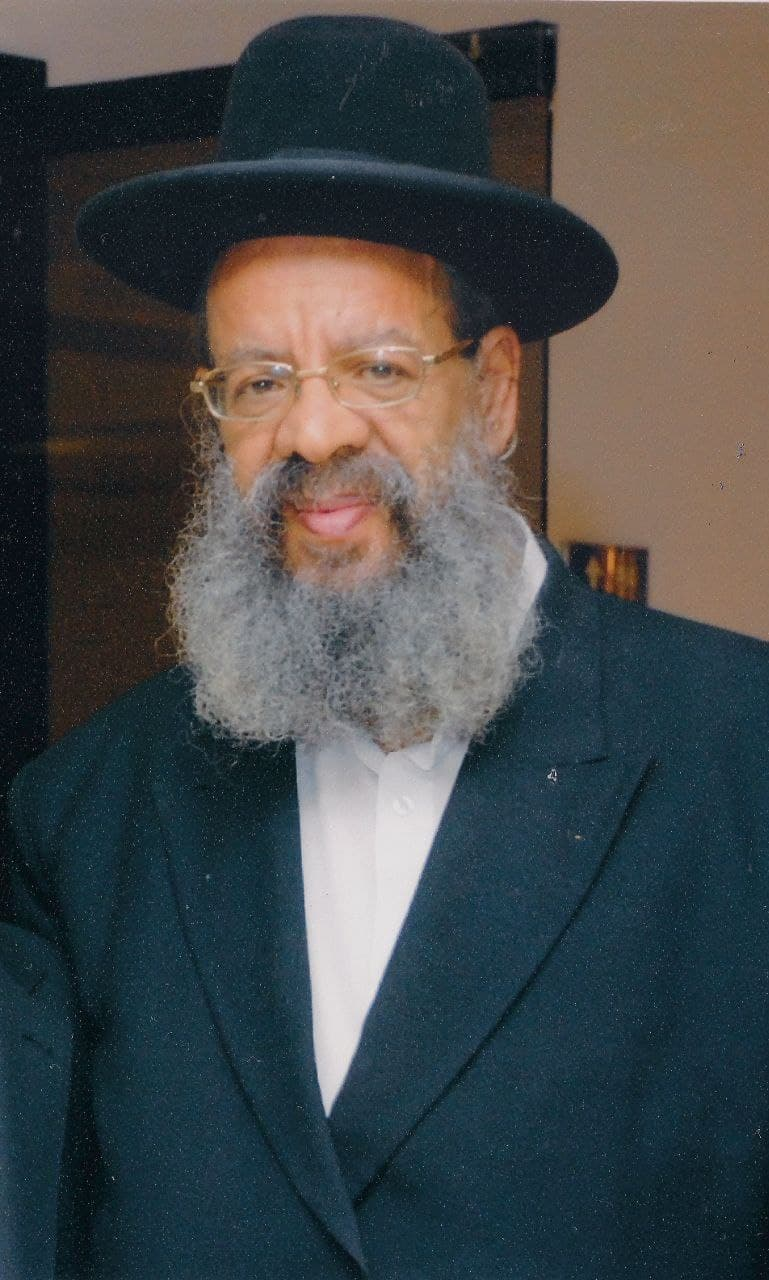

Faction represented in the Knesset
- 1988–2003: Shas

Personal details
- Born: 11 March 1951 Beersheba, Israel
- Died: 6 August 2021 (aged 70) Sderot, Israel

Aryeh Gamliel (Hebrew: אריה גמליאל; 11 March 1951 – 6 August 2021) was an Israeli rabbi and politician who served as a member of the Knesset for Shas between 1988 and 2003.

== Biography ==
Born in Beersheba, Gamliel was educated at a religious high school and a Talmudic College, before working as head of a Talmudic College.

He was first elected to the Knesset on Shas' list in 1988. After being re-elected in 1992, he was appointed Deputy Minister of Housing and Construction in Yitzhak Rabin's government, but resigned on 9 September 1993.

After retaining his seat again in the 1996 elections, he was appointed Deputy Minister of Religious Affairs, a position which he served in (aside from two brief breaks in August 1997 and January/February 1998) until the 1999 elections. He retained his seat again in the elections (in which he was placed second on the list after Aryeh Deri), but lost it in the 2003 elections. A relative of his, Gila Gamliel, later served as a Knesset member for Likud.

He died on 6 August 2021.
