= Ministry of Religious Services =

Government ministry of Israel

- המשרד לשירותי דת
- Emblem of Israel

Agency overview
- Formed: 1949, 2008
- Dissolved: 2003
- Jurisdiction: Government of Israel
- Minister responsible: Yariv Levin
- Website: www.dat.gov.il

The Ministry of Religious Services (Hebrew: המשרד לשירותי דת, romanized: HaMisrad leSherutay Dat), formerly the Ministry of Religious Affairs and Ministry of Religions, is a government ministry of Israel that handles Jewish religious affairs.

== Responsibilities ==
The Ministry of Religious Services is responsible for the provision of Jewish religious services. this includes the construction, renovation and maintenance of synagogues and ritual baths, the maintenance of local Eruvs, the certification of kashrut in public and government institutions, the registration and conducting of marriages, the issual of burial licenses and the regulation and maintenance of Jewish cemeteries, the employment of municipal and neighborhood rabbis, and the organization of religious cultural activities.

The Ministry is also solely responsible for regulating Israel's 132 Religious Councils and approximately 600 Jewish burial associations. In the former role, the Ministry appoints 45% of the members of each religious council, or two acting members in case the Ministry, Municipal Government and Local Rabbis cannot agree on the council's composition.

== History ==
The Ministry was included in the provisional government, and was initially known as the Ministry of Religions and War Victims. It was responsible for the provision of Jewish, Christian, Muslim and Druze religious services. Upon the formation of the second government on 8 October 1951 it became the Ministry of Religions. In 1981 it was renamed the Ministry of Religious Affairs.

In 2003, the Ministry of Religious Affairs was abolished. Its departments were split between other ministries while the newly-established National Authority for Religious Services within the Prime Minister's Office took its place. Responsibility for non-Jewish religious affairs was transferred to the Ministry of Interior and The Prime Mnister's Office was placed in charge of executing several laws which mentioned the ministry. Between 2006 and 2008, Yitzhak Cohen served as a minister in the Prime Minister's Office, and was responsible for Religious Services. The ministry was re-established in 2008 as the Ministry of Religious Services to provide Jewish religious services.

== List of ministers ==
The Religious Services Minister of Israel (Hebrew: שר לשירותי דת, Sar LeShirutei Dat) is the political head of the Ministry of Religious Services and a relatively minor position in the Israeli cabinet.

Most office holders have been religious Jews, though some were secular. Haim Yosef Zadok, a secular Jew, served twice, in 1974 and 1977. During his short stints, Zadok worked to streamline the operation of the rabbinical courts and strengthen relations with the religious leaders of all faiths. Zerach Warhaftig was the longest serving minister, holding the post for over 12 years between 1961 and 1974. In Benjamin Netanyahu's government the portfolio changed hands six times, with four people holding the post (Netanyahu three times and Eli Suissa twice).

#	Minister	Party	Government	Term start	Term end	Notes
Minister of Religions
1	Yehuda Leib Maimon	Mizrachi; United Religious Front	P, 1, 2	14 May 1948	8 October 1951	
2	Haim-Moshe Shapira	Hapoel HaMizrachi; National Religious Party	3, 4, 5, 6, 7, 8	8 October 1951	1 July 1958	
3	Ya'akov Moshe Toledano	Not an MK	8, 9	3 December 1958	15 October 1960	Died in office
4	Zerach Warhaftig	National Religious Party	10, 11, 12, 13, 14, 15	2 November 1961	10 March 1974	
5	Yitzhak Rafael	National Religious Party	16	10 March 1974	3 June 1974	
6	Haim Yosef Zadok	Alignment	17	3 June 1974	29 October 1974	
–	Yitzhak Rafael	National Religious Party	17	30 October 1974	22 December 1976	
–	Haim Yosef Zadok	Alignment	17	16 January 1977	20 June 1977	
7	Aharon Abuhatzira	National Religious Party	18	20 June 1977	5 August 1981	
Minister of Religious Affairs
8	Yosef Burg	National Religious Party	19, 20	5 August 1981	13 September 1984	
9	Shimon Peres	Alignment	21	13 September 1984	23 December 1984	
–	Yosef Burg	National Religious Party	21	13 September 1984	5 October 1986	
10	Zevulun Hammer	National Religious Party	21, 22, 23	7 October 1986	11 June 1990	
11	Avner Shaki	National Religious Party	24	11 June 1990	13 July 1992	
12	Yitzhak Rabin	Labor Party	25	13 July 1992	27 February 1995	
13	Shimon Shetreet	Labor Party	25, 26	27 February 1995	18 June 1996	
14	Benjamin Netanyahu	Likud	27	18 June 1996	7 August 1996	
15	Eli Suissa	Shas	27	7 August 1996	12 August 1997	
–	Benjamin Netanyahu	Likud	27	12 August 1997	22 August 1997	
–	Zevulun Hammer	National Religious Party	27	22 August 1997	20 January 1998	Died in office
–	Benjamin Netanyahu	Likud	27	20 January 1998	25 February 1998	
16	Yitzhak Levy	National Religious Party	27	25 February 1998	13 September 1998	
–	Eli Suissa	Shas	27	13 September 1998	6 July 1999	
17	Yitzhak Cohen	Shas	28	6 July 1999	11 July 2000	
18	Yossi Beilin	One Israel	28	11 October 2000	7 March 2001	
19	Asher Ohana	Not an MK	29	7 March 2001	28 February 2003	
20	Ariel Sharon	Likud	30	28 February 2003	31 December 2003	
Minister of Religious Services
–	Yitzhak Cohen	Shas	31	14 January 2008	31 March 2009	
21	Ya'akov Margi	Shas	32	31 March 2009	18 March 2013	
22	Naftali Bennett	The Jewish Home	33	18 March 2013	14 May 2015	
23	David Azulai	Shas	34	14 May 2015	30 October 2018	Died in office
24	Aryeh Deri	Shas	34	14 October 2018	31 December 2018	
25	Yitzhak Vaknin	Shas	34	1 January 2019	17 May 2020	
26	Ya'akov Avitan	Shas (Not an MK)	35	17 May 2020	13 June 2021	
27	Matan Kahana	Yamina	36	13 June 2021	15 May 2022	
–	Naftali Bennett	Yamina	36	15 May 2022	15 August 2022	
28	Michael Malchieli	Shas	37	29 December 2022	17 July 2025	
–	Benjamin Netanyahu	Likud	37	July 2025	July 2025	
29	Yariv Levin	Likud	37	29 July 2025		

=== Deputy ministers ===
#	Minister	Party	Government	Term start	Term end
1	Zerach Warhaftig	Hapoel HaMizrachi	4	5 January 1953	26 January 1954
–	Zerach Warhaftig	National Religious Party	7, 8	9 January 1956	1 July 1958
2	Binyamin Shahor	National Religious Party	13, 14	1 February 1966	17 November 1969
3	Haim Drukman	National Religious Party	19	11 August 1981	2 March 1982
4	Moshe Gafni	Degel HaTorah	24	23 July 1990	13 July 1992
5	Rafael Pinhasi	Shas	25	31 December 1992	14 September 1993
6	Aryeh Gamliel	Shas	27	13 August 1996	22 August 1997
–	Aryeh Gamliel	Shas	27	24 August 1997	20 January 1998
–	Aryeh Gamliel	Shas	27	25 February 1998	6 July 1999
7	Yigal Bibi	National Religious Party	27	13 August 1996	20 January 1998
–	Yigal Bibi	National Religious Party	27	25 February 1998	6 July 1999
–	Yigal Bibi	National Religious Party	28	5 August 1999	12 July 2000
8	Eli Ben-Dahan	The Jewish Home	33	18 March 2013	14 May 2015
9	Matan Kahana	Yamina	36	16 May 2022	15 August 2022
