= Ma'ayan HaChinuch HaTorani =

Education network in Israel

The Ma'ayan HaChinuch HaTorani (Hebrew: מעיין החינוך התורני) is an education network in Israel, founded in 1984 by the Sephardi Rabbi Ovadia Yosef for the purpose of providing a religious Torah education to the Sephardi community. Rabbi Yosef served as the head of the organization until his death.

It currently operates 130 schools throughout Israel.

The secretary general is Rabbi Moshe Maya. One of its former secretaries general, Rabbi Yitzhak Cohen, currently serves as the deputy finance minister of Israel.
