= Eli Suissa =

Israeli politician (born 1956)

- אלי סויסה
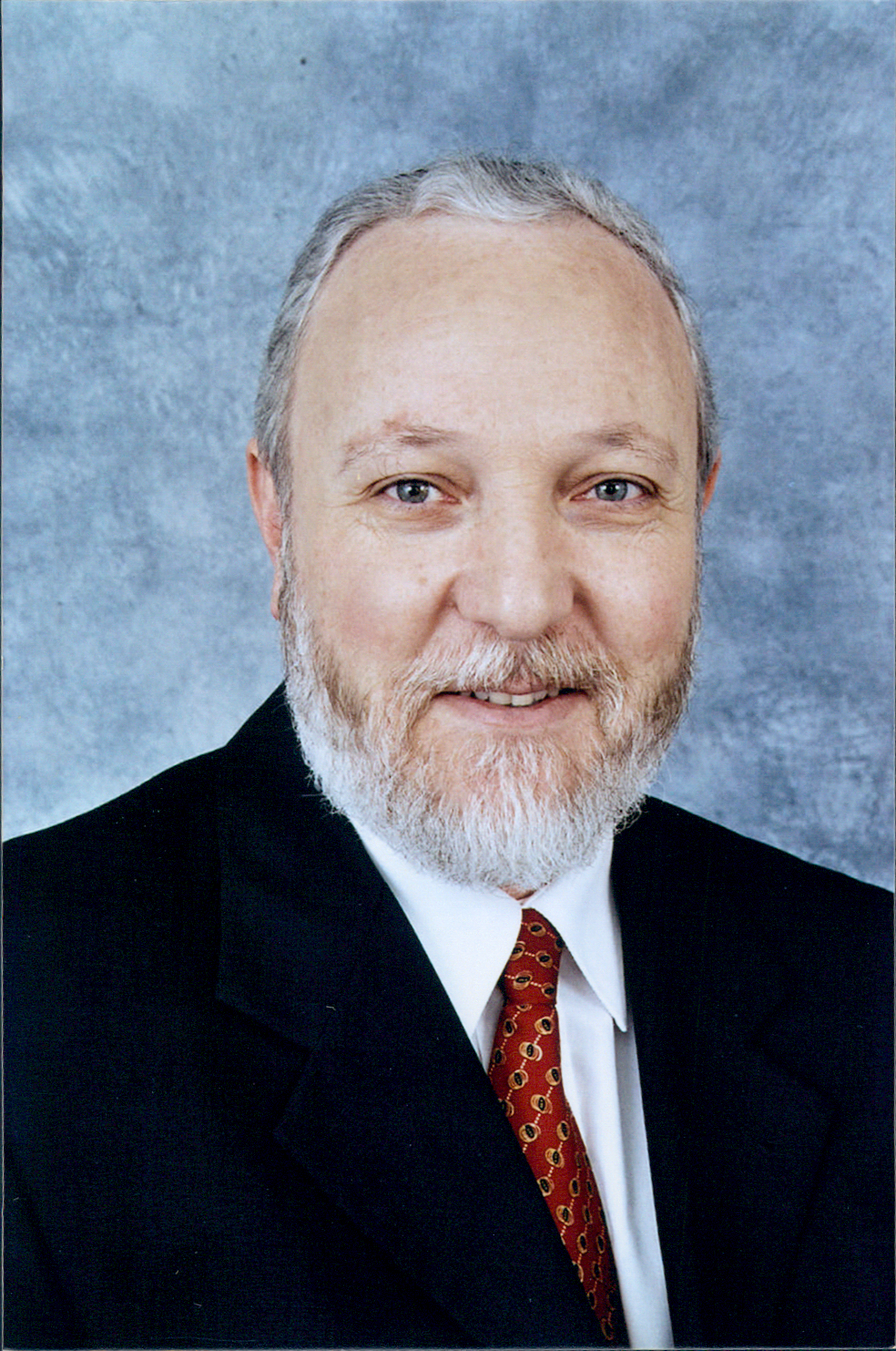
- Suissa during his time in the Knesset

Ministerial roles
- 1996–1999: Minister of Internal Affairs
- 1996–1997: Minister of Religious Affairs
- 1998–1999: Minister of Religious Affairs
- 1999–2000: Minister of National Infrastructure
- 2001–2002: Minister of Jerusalem Affairs
- 2002–2004: Minister of Jerusalem Affairs

Faction represented in the Knesset
- 1999–2003: Shas

Personal details
- Born: 1956; Morocco

Rabbi Eliyahu "Eli" Suissa (Hebrew: אליהו "אלי" סויסה; born 1956) is an Israeli former politician who held several ministerial portfolios during the 1990s and early 2000s.

== Biography ==
Born in Morocco in 1956, Suissa's family emigrated to Israel later in the same year. He studied at a yeshiva and was ordained as a rabbi.

Despite not being a member of the Knesset, he was appointed Minister of Internal Affairs in Binyamin Netanyahu's government in June 1996. On August 7, he became Minister of Religious Affairs in addition to his existing role, but served for only five days, before Netanyahu took the post himself and then gave it to Zevulon Hammer. Following Hammer's death in January 1998, Netanyahu briefly held the portfolio again, before handing it to Yitzhak Levy. In September 1998, Suissa took over as Religious Affairs Minister again. Overall, the portfolio changed hands six times during the 3-year government.

In the 1999 elections, he was voted into the Knesset on Shas' list, and was appointed Minister of National Infrastructure. He left the cabinet when Shas withdrew from the government in July 2000, but returned when Ariel Sharon formed a new government in March 2001, this time as Minister of Jerusalem Affairs. He served until the 2003 elections, aside from a brief period between 23 May and 3 June 2002 when Shas pulled out of the coalition.

Suissa lost his seat and place in the cabinet following the 2003 elections.
