= Party lists for the 1996 Israeli general election =

The 1996 Israeli general election was held using closed list proportional representation. Each party presented a list of candidates to the Central Elections Committee prior to the election.

== Labor ==
The Israeli Labor Party's list was led by Shimon Peres.

1. Shimon Peres
2. Uzi Baram
3. Ehud Barak
4. Binyamin Ben-Eliezer
5. Haim Ramon
6. Avraham Shochat
7. Nissim Zvili
8. Efraim Sneh
9. Dalia Itzik
10. Ori Orr
11. Yossi Beilin
12. Shevah Weiss
13. Rafi Elul
14. Rafael Edri
15. Hagai Meirom
16. Yossi Katz
17. Nawaf Massalha
18. Ora Namir
19. Eli Ben-Menachem
20. Eli Goldschmidt
21. David Libai
22. Ra'anan Cohen
23. Amir Peretz
24. Moshe Shahal
25. Sofa Landver
26. Ofir Pines-Paz
27. Shalom Simhon
28. Yael Dayan
29. Micha Goldman
30. Adisu Massala
31. Salah Tarif
32. Avi Yehezkel
33. Yona Yahav
34. Efi Oshaya
35. Shlomo Ben-Ami
36. Eitan Cabel
37. Rafik Haj Yahia
38. Nadia Hilou
39. Ron Huldai
40. Tzali Reshef
41. Ofra Friedman
42. Eitan Broshi
43. Shimon Sheetrit
44. Weizman Shiry
45. Ora Hakem
46. Ronen Plot
47. Yaakov Turner
48. Eli Dayan
49. Shmuel Avital
50. Yemin Suissa
51. Talal Alkernawi
52. Saadia Marciano
53. Hussein Suleiman
54. Mordechai Groberg
55. Masha Lubelsky
56. Pini Shomer
57. Gedalia Gal
58. Ayyid Frej
59. Noga Botansky
60. Yehuda Ben-Harush
61. Haim Cohen
62. Nitza Shapira-Livai
63. Eli Elizabeth Aloni
64. Asher Smueli
65. Nissim Suzette
66. Yoram Marciano
67. Dov Oren
68. Avraham Ben-Shabbat
69. Eli Zidan
70. Yosef Vanunu

== Likud-Gesher-Tzomet ==
The joint list between Likud, Gesher and Tzomet was led by Benjamin Netanyahu.

1. Benjamin Netanyahu
2. David Levy
3. Rafael Eitan
4. Yitzhak Mordechai
5. Ariel Sharon
6. Moshe Katsav
7. Benny Begin
8. Eliezer Sandberg
9. David Magen
10. Ehud Olmert
11. Dan Meridor
12. Tzachi Hanegbi
13. Uzi Landau
14. Maxim Levy
15. Haim Dayan
16. Limor Livnat
17. Michael Eitan
18. Silvan Shalom
19. Gideon Ezra
20. Moshe Peled
21. Michael Kleiner
22. Meir Sheetrit
23. Eliyahu Ben-Elissar
24. Dan Tichon
25. Naomi Blumenthal
26. Yehoshua Matza
27. Avraham Hirschson
28. David Re'em
29. Zeev Boim
30. Yehuda Lancry
31. Pini Badash
32. Shaul Amor
33. Reuven Rivlin
34. Ron Nachman
35. Israel Katz
36. Doron Shmueli
37. Mordechai Mishani
38. Ovadia Eli
39. Zvi Zilker
40. Ezra Binyamini
41. Yaakov Bardugo
42. Nehama Ronen
43. Yosef Olmert
44. Dov Shilansky
45. Yuli Koshorovsky
46. Assad Assad
47. Geulah Cohen
48. Yosef Ahimeir
49. Barazani Mezukak Sinai
50. Omer Mordechai
51. David Mena
52. Alexander Vexler
53. Yoav Gelber
54. Tzipi Livni
55. Mor Shmagar
56. Eli Landau
57. Michael Ratzon
58. Ra'ik Sa'ar
59. Yardena Magen
60. Shaul Said

== Shas ==
Shas' electoral list was led by Aryeh Deri.

1. Aryeh Deri
2. Aryeh Gamliel
3. Rafael Pinhasi
4. Shlomo Benizri
5. Eli Yishai
6. Yitzhak Cohen
7. David Azulai
8. David Tal
9. Nissim Dahan
10. Yitzhak Vaknin
11. Uzi Aharon
12. Yoav Ben-Tzur
13. Yitzhak Moses
14. Moshe Ilouz
15. Yehuda Yisraeli
16. Amram Ilouz
17. Shimon Gerson
18. Yitzhak Sultan
19. Moshe Abutbul
20. Yair Yaish Peretz

== National Religious Party ==
The National Religious Party list was led by Zevulun Hammer.

1. Zevulun Hammer
2. Shaul Yahalom
3. Yitzhak Levy
4. Yigal Bibi
5. Zvi Hendel
6. Hanan Porat
7. Shmaryahu Ben-Tzur
8. Avraham Stern
9. Avner Shaki
10. Nissan Slomiansky
11. Eliyahu Gabai
12. Meir Shmuel
13. Sivan Viva
14. Zevulun Orlev
15. Azriel Tsadok
16. Shmuel Za'afrani
17. Yehudith Huebner
18. Eliezer Sheffer
19. Aharon Kupolovitz
20. David Bukhnik

== Meretz ==
The Meretz list was led by Yossi Sarid.

1. Yossi Sarid
2. Haim Oron
3. Amnon Rubinstein
4. Ran Cohen
5. David Zucker
6. Anat Maor
7. Avraham Poraz
8. Naomi Chazan
9. Walid Haj Yahia
10. Binyamin Temkin
11. Zehava Galon
12. Ilan Gilon
13. Yehudit Naot
14. Arnon Yekutieli
15. Mordechai Virshubski
16. Hanan Erez
17. Shoshanna Arar
18. Ofer Shitrit
19. Giora Ram
20. Ruth Rasnic

== Yisrael BaAliyah ==
The Yisrael BaAliyah list was led by Natan Sharansky.

1. Natan Sharansky
2. Michael Nudelman
3. Yuli Edelstein
4. Yuri Stern
5. Marina Solodkin
6. Zvi Weinberg
7. Roman Bronfman
8. Yitzhak Hen
9. Shlomo Borochov
10. Daniel Galay
11. Felix Oroshenko
12. Elena Kim
13. Yury Zmoshchik
14. Marina Zeltser
15. Natan Felts
16. Ephraim Melamed
17. Kirill Sochnok
18. Sophia Kovton
19. Michael Levitt

== Hadash-Balad ==
The joint Hadash-Balad list was led by Hashem Mahameed.

1. Hashem Mahameed
2. Saleh Saleem
3. Tamar Gozansky
4. Azmi Bishara
5. Ahmad Sa'd
6. Wasil Taha
7. Said Nafa
8. Ilan Pappé
9. Ziad Naila
10. Gila Svirsky

== United Torah Judaism ==
The United Torah Judaism list was led by Meir Porush.

1. Meir Porush
2. Avraham Ravitz
3. Shmuel Halpert
4. Moshe Gafni
5. Avraham Leizerson
6. Yisrael Eichler
7. Haim Brilant
8. Yosef Vardiger
9. Yosef Abo
10. Zvi Boimel

== Third Way ==
The Third Way list was led by Avigdor Kahalani.

1. Avigdor Kahalani
2. Yehuda Harel
3. Emanuel Zisman
4. Alexander Lubotzky
5. Uzi Keren
6. Eliyahu Malka
7. Emira Parlov
8. Kamel Pars
9. Raanan Levy
10. Elishiv Shimshi

== Ra'am-Mada ==
The Ra'am-Mada list was led by Abdulmalik Dehamshe.

1. Abdulmalik Dehamshe
2. Abdulwahab Darawshe
3. Taleb el-Sana
4. Tawfik Khatib
5. Abu Ahmed Salman
6. Muhamad Kanan
7. Juma Alktsatsi
8. Samir Bobo
9. Hassan Gawi

== Moledet ==
The Moledet list was led by Rehavam Ze'evi.

1. Rehavam Ze'evi
2. Binyamin Elon
3. Meshulam Amit
4. Rafaela Segal

== Extraparliamentary parties ==
The following are parties which won no seats in the 1996 election.

=== Unity for the Defence of New Immigrants ===
The Unity for the Defence of New Immigrants list was led by Efraim Gur.

1. Efraim Gur
2. Yaakov Faitelson
3. Efraim Fainelbaum
4. Yisrael Freiv

=== Gil ===
The Gil list was led by Nava Arad.

1. Nava Arad
2. Moshe Sharoni
3. Avraham Tobol
4. Or Asher

=== Progressive Confederation ===
The Progressive Confederation list was led by Muhammad Zidan.

1. Muhammad Zidan
2. Said Azbarga
3. Ahmad Abu-Friha
4. Mahmoud Mansour

=== Telem Emuna ===
The Telem Emuna list was led by Yosef Azran.

1. Yosef Azran
2. Yehezkel Ashaiek
3. Yaakov Asur
4. Avner Lev-Ari
5. Abba Nahmani
6. Menashe Motvassel
7. Eliyahu Fenk

=== Settlement Party ===
The Settlement Party was led by Eliezer Levinger.

1. Eliezer Levinger
2. Ronen Tzafrir
3. Shmuel Bar-on
4. Yaakov Becher
5. Yehoshua Lerkh
6. Giora Stav
7. Esther Alexander
8. Iris Alka'ai

=== Yamin Yisrael ===
The Yamin Yisrael list was led by Miriam Lapid.

1. Miriam Lapid
2. Shaul Gutman
3. Shlomo Liensky
4. Ze'ev Karuz
5. Yoel Lerner
6. Eleonora Shifrin
7. Haggai Ashur

=== Man's Rights in the Family Party ===
The Man's Rights in the Family Party was led by Yaakov Schlusser.

1. Yaakov Schlusser.
2. Miriam Schlusser.
3. Shmuel Milbet
4. Yisrael Shmuelov
5. Danny Tarabulus

=== Ta'al ===
The Ta'al list was led by Ahmad Tibi. Ta'al withdrew from the election shortly before election day but remained on the ballot.

1. Ahmad Tibi
2. Ahmed Nassar
3. Miriam Mari
4. Elias Jabur

=== Da'am ===
The Da'am list was led by Assaf Adiv.

1. Assaf Adiv
2. Samia Nasser
3. Kemal Al-Jaffry
4. Michal Efrat Ben-Schwartz
