= List of members of the fourteenth Knesset =

The 120 members of the fourteenth Knesset were elected on 29 May 1996. The breakdown by party was as follows:

- Labor Party: 34
- Likud-Gesher-Tzomet: 32
- Shas: 10
- National Religious Party: 9
- Meretz: 9
- Yisrael BaAliyah: 7
- Hadash-Balad: 5
- United Torah Judaism: 4
- The Third Way: 4
- Arab Democratic Party-United Arab List (Mada-Ra'am): 4
- Moledet: 2

== List of members ==
| Party | MK | Notes |
|---|---|---|
| Labor Party | Adisu Massala | Left party to establish One Nation |
| Labor Party | Amir Peretz | Left party to establish One Nation |
| Labor Party | Avraham Shochat | |
| Labor Party | Avraham Yehezkel | |
| Labor Party | Binyamin Ben-Eliezer | |
| Labor Party | Dalia Itzik | |
| Labor Party | David Libai | Replaced by Eitan Cabel on 15 October 1996 |
| Labor Party | Efi Oshaya | |
| Labor Party | Efraim Sneh | |
| Labor Party | Ehud Barak | |
| Labor Party | Eli Ben-Menachem | |
| Labor Party | Eli Goldschmidt | |
| Labor Party | Hagai Meirom | Left party to establish Centre Party |
| Labor Party | Haim Ramon | |
| Labor Party | Micha Goldman | |
| Labor Party | Moshe Shahal | Replaced by Rafik Haj Yahia on 20 March 1998 |
| Labor Party | Nawaf Massalha | |
| Labor Party | Nissim Zvili | Left party to establish Centre Party |
| Labor Party | Ophir Pines-Paz | |
| Labor Party | Ori Orr | |
| Labor Party | Ra'anan Cohen | |
| Labor Party | Rafael Edri | |
| Labor Party | Rafi Elul | |
| Labor Party | Saleh Tarif | |
| Labor Party | Shalom Simhon | |
| Labor Party | Shevah Weiss | |
| Labor Party | Shimon Peres | |
| Labor Party | Shlomo Ben-Ami | |
| Labor Party | Sofa Landver | |
| Labor Party | Uzi Baram | |
| Labor Party | Yael Dayan | |
| Labor Party | Yona Yahav | |
| Labor Party | Yossi Beilin | |
| Labor Party | Yossi Katz | |
| Likud-Gesher-Tzomet | Ariel Sharon | When the alliance split, represented Likud |
| Likud-Gesher-Tzomet | Avraham Hirschson | When the alliance split, represented Likud |
| Likud-Gesher-Tzomet | Benjamin Netanyahu | When the alliance split, represented Likud |
| Likud-Gesher-Tzomet | Benny Begin | Left party to establish Herut – The National Movement |
| Likud-Gesher-Tzomet | Dan Meridor | Left party to establish Centre Party |
| Likud-Gesher-Tzomet | Dan Tichon | When the alliance split, represented Likud |
| Likud-Gesher-Tzomet | David Levy | When the alliance split, represented Gesher |
| Likud-Gesher-Tzomet | David Magen | Left party to establish Centre Party |
| Likud-Gesher-Tzomet | David Re'em | Left party to establish Herut – The National Movement |
| Likud-Gesher-Tzomet | Ehud Olmert | Replaced by Yisrael Katz on 18 November 1998 |
| Likud-Gesher-Tzomet | Eliahu Ben Elissar | Replaced by Reuven Rivlin on 1 September 1996 |
| Likud-Gesher-Tzomet | Eliezer Sandberg | Left party to establish Centre Party, before establishing HaTzeirim and then joining Shinui |
| Likud-Gesher-Tzomet | Gideon Ezra | When the alliance split, represented Likud |
| Likud-Gesher-Tzomet | Haim Dayan | When the alliance split, represented Tzomet |
| Likud-Gesher-Tzomet | Joshua Matza | When the alliance split, represented Likud |
| Likud-Gesher-Tzomet | Limor Livnat | When the alliance split, represented Likud |
| Likud-Gesher-Tzomet | Maxim Levy | When the alliance split, represented Gesher |
| Likud-Gesher-Tzomet | Meir Sheetrit | When the alliance split, represented Likud |
| Likud-Gesher-Tzomet | Michael Eitan | When the alliance split, represented Likud |
| Likud-Gesher-Tzomet | Michael Kleiner | Left party to establish Herut – The National Movement |
| Likud-Gesher-Tzomet | Moshe Katsav | When the alliance split, represented Likud |
| Likud-Gesher-Tzomet | Moshe Peled | When the alliance split, represented Tzomet, before establishing Mekhora and then joining Moledet |
| Likud-Gesher-Tzomet | Naomi Blumenthal | When the alliance split, represented Likud |
| Likud-Gesher-Tzomet | Pini Badash | Replaced by Doron Shmueli on 30 November 1998 |
| Likud-Gesher-Tzomet | Rafael Eitan | When the alliance split, represented Tzomet |
| Likud-Gesher-Tzomet | Shaul Amor | When the alliance split, represented Likud |
| Likud-Gesher-Tzomet | Silvan Shalom | When the alliance split, represented Likud |
| Likud-Gesher-Tzomet | Tzachi Hanegbi | When the alliance split, represented Likud |
| Likud-Gesher-Tzomet | Uzi Landau | When the alliance split, represented Likud |
| Likud-Gesher-Tzomet | Yehuda Lancry | When the alliance split, represented Gesher |
| Likud-Gesher-Tzomet | Yitzhak Mordechai | Left party to establish Centre Party |
| Likud-Gesher-Tzomet | Ze'ev Boim | When the alliance split, represented Likud |
| Shas | Aryeh Deri | |
| Shas | Aryeh Gamliel | |
| Shas | David Azulai | |
| Shas | David Tal | |
| Shas | Eli Yishai | |
| Shas | Nissim Dahan | |
| Shas | Rafael Pinhasi | |
| Shas | Shlomo Benizri | |
| Shas | Yitzhak Cohen | |
| Shas | Yitzhak Vaknin | |
| National Religious Party | Avner Shaki | |
| National Religious Party | Avraham Stern | Replaced by Nissan Slomiansky on 12 May 1997 |
| National Religious Party | Hanan Porat | Left party to establish Tkuma |
| National Religious Party | Shaul Yahalom | |
| National Religious Party | Shmaryahu Ben-Tzur | |
| National Religious Party | Yigal Bibi | |
| National Religious Party | Yitzhak Levy | |
| National Religious Party | Zevulun Hammer | Replaced by Eliyahu Gabai on 20 January 1998 |
| National Religious Party | Zvi Hendel | Left party to establish Tkuma |
| Meretz | Amnon Rubinstein | |
| Meretz | Anat Maor | |
| Meretz | Avraham Poraz | Left party to re-establish Shinui as an independent faction |
| Meretz | David Zucker | Left party to sit as an independent |
| Meretz | Haim Oron | |
| Meretz | Naomi Chazan | |
| Meretz | Ran Cohen | |
| Meretz | Walid Haj Yahia | |
| Meretz | Yossi Sarid | |
| Yisrael BaAliyah | Marina Solodkin | |
| Yisrael BaAliyah | Michael Nudelman | Left party to establish Aliyah |
| Yisrael BaAliyah | Natan Sharansky | |
| Yisrael BaAliyah | Roman Bronfman | |
| Yisrael BaAliyah | Yuli-Yoel Edelstein | |
| Yisrael BaAliyah | Yuri Stern | Left party to establish Aliyah |
| Yisrael BaAliyah | Zvi Weinberg | |
| Hadash-Balad | Ahmad Sa'd | When the alliance split, represented Hadash |
| Hadash-Balad | Azmi Bishara | When the alliance split, represented Balad |
| Hadash-Balad | Hashem Mahameed | When the alliance split, represented Balad |
| Hadash-Balad | Saleh Saleem | When the alliance split, represented Hadash |
| Hadash-Balad | Tamar Gozansky | When the alliance split, represented Hadash |
| United Torah Judaism | Avraham Ravitz | When the alliance split, represented Degel HaTorah |
| United Torah Judaism | Meir Porush | When the alliance split, represented Agudat Yisrael |
| United Torah Judaism | Moshe Gafni | Replaced by Avraham Leizerson on 23 October 1998 |
| United Torah Judaism | Shmuel Halpert | When the alliance split, represented Agudat Yisrael |
| The Third Way | Alexander Lubotzky | |
| The Third Way | Avigdor Kahalani | |
| The Third Way | Emanuel Zisman | Left party to sit as an independent |
| The Third Way | Yehuda Harel | |
| Mada-Ra'am | Abdulmalik Dehamshe | |
| Mada-Ra'am | Abdulwahab Darawshe | |
| Mada-Ra'am | Taleb el-Sana | |
| Mada-Ra'am | Tawfik Khatib | |
| Moledet | Binyamin Elon | |
| Moledet | Rehavam Ze'evi | |

=== Replacements ===
| MK | Replaced | Date | Party | Notes |
|---|---|---|---|---|
| Reuven Rivlin | Eliahu Ben Elissar | 1 September 1996 | Likud-Gesher-Tzomet | When the alliance split, represented Likud |
| Eitan Cabel | David Libai | 15 October 1996 | Labor Party | |
| Nissan Slomiansky | Avraham Stern | 12 May 1997 | National Religious Party | |
| Eliyahu Gabai | Zevulun Hammer | 20 January 1998 | National Religious Party | |
| Rafik Haj Yahia | Moshe Shahal | 20 March 1998 | Labor Party | Left party to establish One Nation |
| Avraham Leizerson | Moshe Gafni | 23 October 1998 | United Torah Judaism | When the alliance split, represented Agudat Yisrael |
| Yisrael Katz | Ehud Olmert | 18 November 1998 | Likud-Gesher-Tzomet | When the alliance split, represented Likud |
| Doron Shmueli | Pini Badash | 30 November 1998 | Likud-Gesher-Tzomet | When the alliance split, represented Likud |
