= Progressive National Alliance =

Progressive National Alliance ברית לאומית מתקדמת
- Leader: Hashem Mahameed
- Founded: 2002
- Split from: United Arab List
- Ideology: Israeli Arab interest
- Most MKs: 1 (1999)

Election symbol
- צף

The Progressive National Alliance (Hebrew: ברית לאומית מתקדמת, Brit Leumit Mitkademet), originally known as National Unity – National Progressive Alliance (Hebrew: אחדות לאומית – הברית הלאומית המתקדמת, Ahdhut Leumit – HaBrit HaLeumit HaMitkademet), was a small Arab political party in Israel in the early 21st century.

== Background ==
The party was formed in December 2002 when Hashem Mahameed left Hadash. He turned the faction into a full political party in order to participate in the 2003 elections, renaming it the Progressive National Alliance. However, the party won only 20,571 votes (0.7%), less than half the number needed to cross the 1.5% electoral threshold. Amongst Israeli Arabs the party won 6.3% of the vote, almost all of them in Mahmeed's hometown, Umm al-Fahm.

Since running in the municipal elections in Umm al-Fahm in October 2003 as part of an alliance with Hadash, Balad and the Sons of the Village Movement, the party has not been active in politics since and appears to have disbanded. Mahmeed was a contender for a place on Hadash's list in the 2006 elections, but was not on the final slate.
