= Pardes Hanna Agricultural High School =

Coordinates: 32°28′28.64″N 34°58′56.56″E

Pardes Hanna Agricultural High School (Hebrew: בית הספר התיכון החקלאי פרדס חנה) established in 1935 by the Palestine Farmers Association, is one of the oldest agricultural high schools in Israel. It was the first agricultural high school in Israel that allowed students to prepare for matriculation exams, while similar schools in the country concentrated only on teaching agricultural skills, with very little general education.

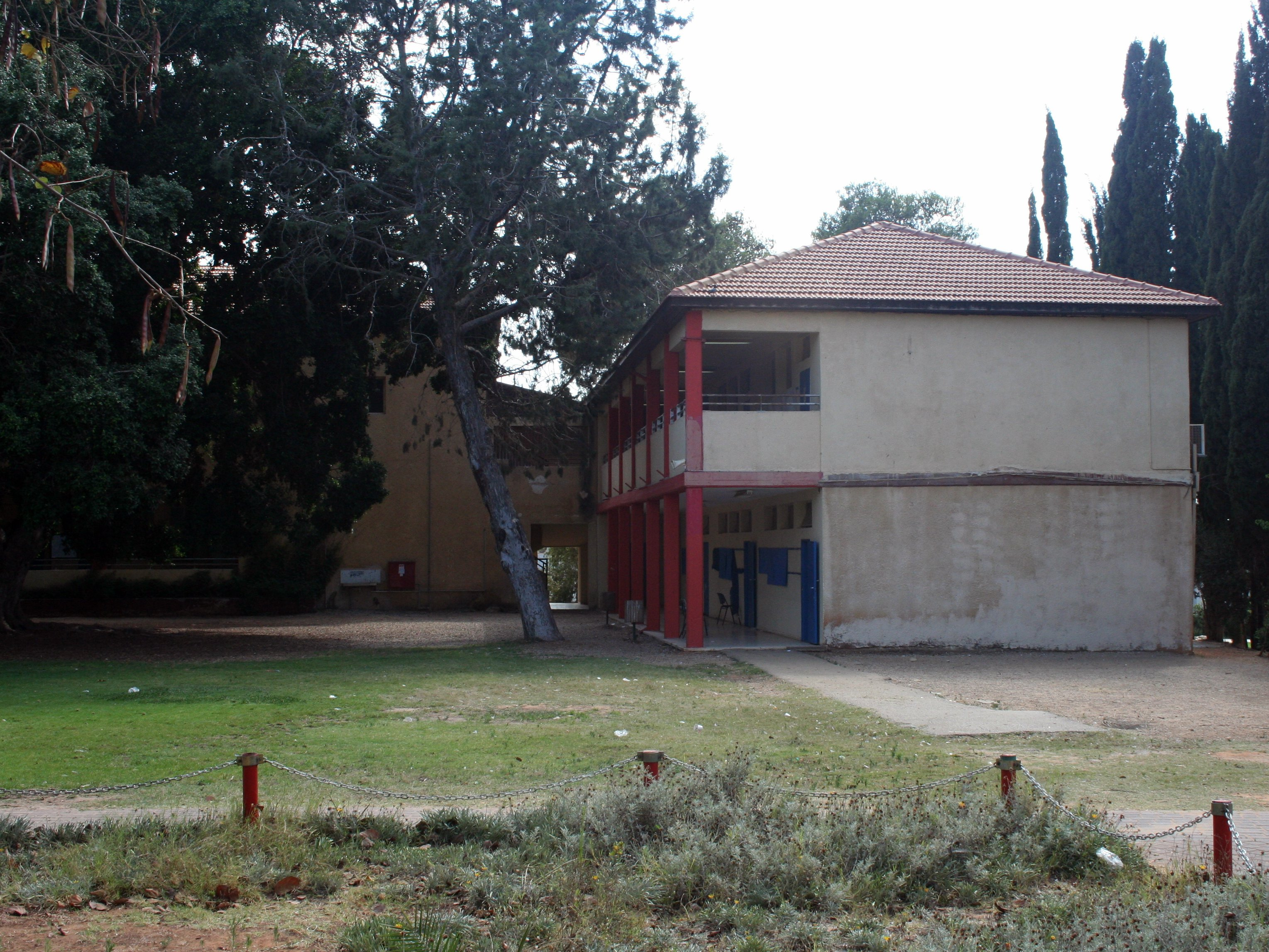
The 7-9 grades building at the Pardes Hanna Agricultural High School

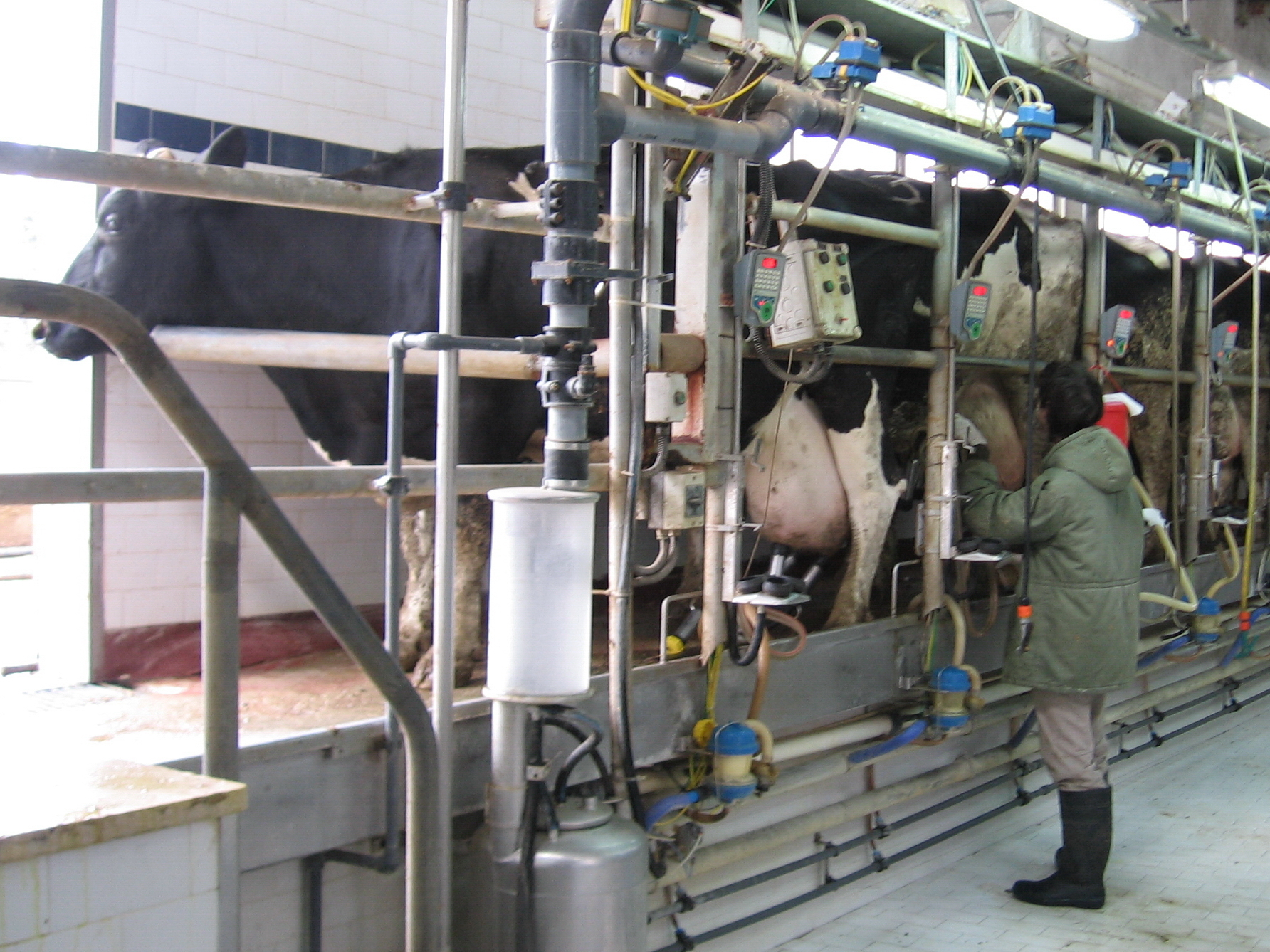
Morning milking at the school's dairy farm

The school was established originally for the children of farmers from Pardes Hanna-Karkur and the vicinity, but soon it attracted students from farming families all over Israel. The school also operated a boarding school on the grounds.

In 2003 the school had 1,647 students in grades 7-12 and employed 160 teachers. The school's yard was among the largest yards of any school in Israel and includes a commercial egg laying chicken coop, a dairy farm, a nursery, and a horse stable. The school also owns large citrus and Avocado orchards that allow students to conduct studies in fruit production. All the work in the different agricultural fields is conducted by the students, under the guidance of professional guides, and it is a part of every students course of studies at the school. All students must take one matriculation exam in an agricultural field of study. Until the end of the 20th century all student had the opportunity of getting a tractor driver's licence as part of their studies, a program that was stopped due to budget cuts.

After a long budget crisis, bringing to the closing of the boarding school and reduction of much of the agricultural educational activities, in 2010 the school was transferred to the administration of the Branco Weiss schools network.

Among the school's graduates are Moti Kirschenbaum, Yehuda Yannay composer, Avraham Katz-Oz the former Agricultural Minister, Elazar Granot, and General Aharon Yariv.

== Notable alumni ==
- Avraham Katz-Oz
- Amnon Straschnov
- Yehuda Yannay
