= Avraham Katz-Oz =

Israeli politician (born 1934)

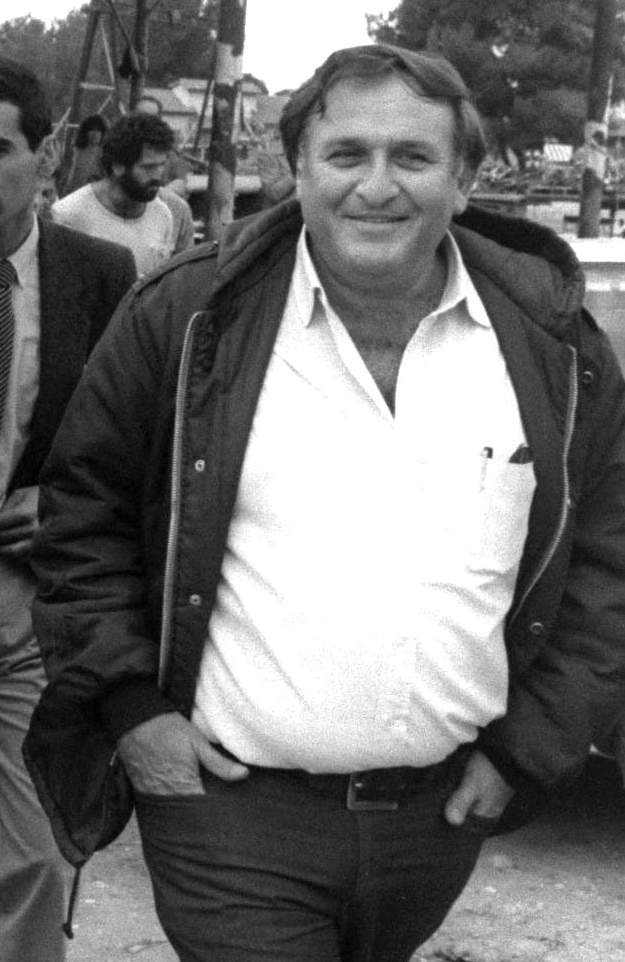
- Katz in 1986

Ministerial roles
- 1988–1990: Minister of Agriculture

Faction represented in the Knesset
- 1978–1991: Alignment
- 1991–1992: Labor Party
- 1995–1996: Labor Party

Personal details
- Born: 7 December 1934 (age 91) Tel Aviv, Mandatory Palestine

Avraham Katz-Oz (Hebrew: אברהם כ"ץ-עוז; born 7 December 1934) is an Israeli former politician who served as a member of the Knesset from 1977 until 1996, and as Minister of Agriculture from 1988 until 1990.

== Biography ==
Katz-Oz was born in Tel Aviv during the Mandate era to Michel-Mordechai Katz and Siona Tagger. He graduated from Pardes Hanna Agricultural High School. Katz-Oz studied at the Faculty for Agriculture in Rehovot and the Faculty for Genetics in Jerusalem. He worked as the agricultural co-ordinator and secretary of kibbutz Nahal Oz and was secretary of Ihud HaKvutzot VeHaKibbutzim between 1969 and 1973.

In 1976 he became chairman of the organisational branch of the Labor Party (then part of the Alignment alliance), serving until 1978. He was on the alliance's list for the 1977 elections, but failed to win a seat. However, he entered the Knesset on 18 April the following year as a replacement for Yitzhak Navon, following his election to the post of president.

He was re-elected in 1981 and 1984, and was appointed Deputy Agriculture Minister in the national unity government formed in 1984. Following the 1988 elections he became Minister of Agriculture, serving until the Alignment withdrew from the government in March 1990. He lost his seat in the 1992 election, though he returned to it in July 1995 as a replacement for the deceased Mordechai Gur. However, he resigned his seat in May 1996 and was replaced by Pini Shomer.
