= Avraham Stern (politician) =

Israeli politician (1935–1997)

- אברהם שטרן
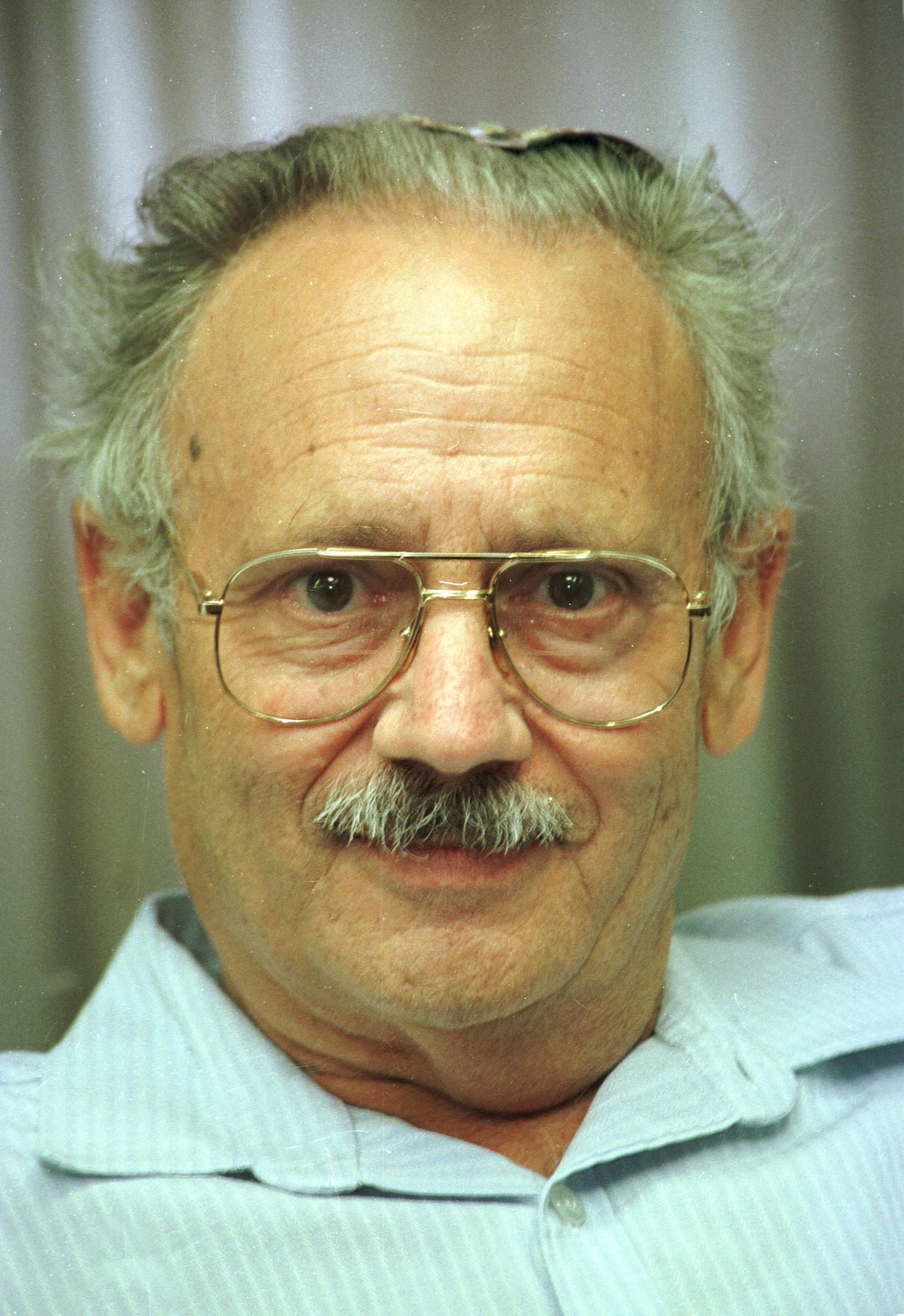

Faction represented in the Knesset
- 1996–1997: National Religious Party

Personal details
- Born: 30 October 1935 Haifa, Mandatory Palestine
- Died: 12 May 1997 (aged 61)

Avraham Stern (Hebrew: אברהם יצחק שטרן; 30 October 1935 – 12 May 1997) was an Israeli administrator and politician. He served as a member of the Knesset for the National Religious Party (Mafdal) between 1996 and 1997.

== Biography ==
Avraham Stern was born in Haifa and obtained a B.A.

== Political career ==
He was Secretary General of the Bnei Akiva youth movement, Political Secretary of the Religious Kibbutz Movement, and also Deputy Chairman of the National Religious Party bureau.

After the general elections of 1996 he entered the 14th Knesset. He was a member from 17 June 1996 until his death on 12 May 1997 and was replaced by Nissan Slomiansky.
