= Avigdor Kahalani =

Israeli soldier and politician

Tat Aluf Avigdor Kahalani
- אביגדור קהלני
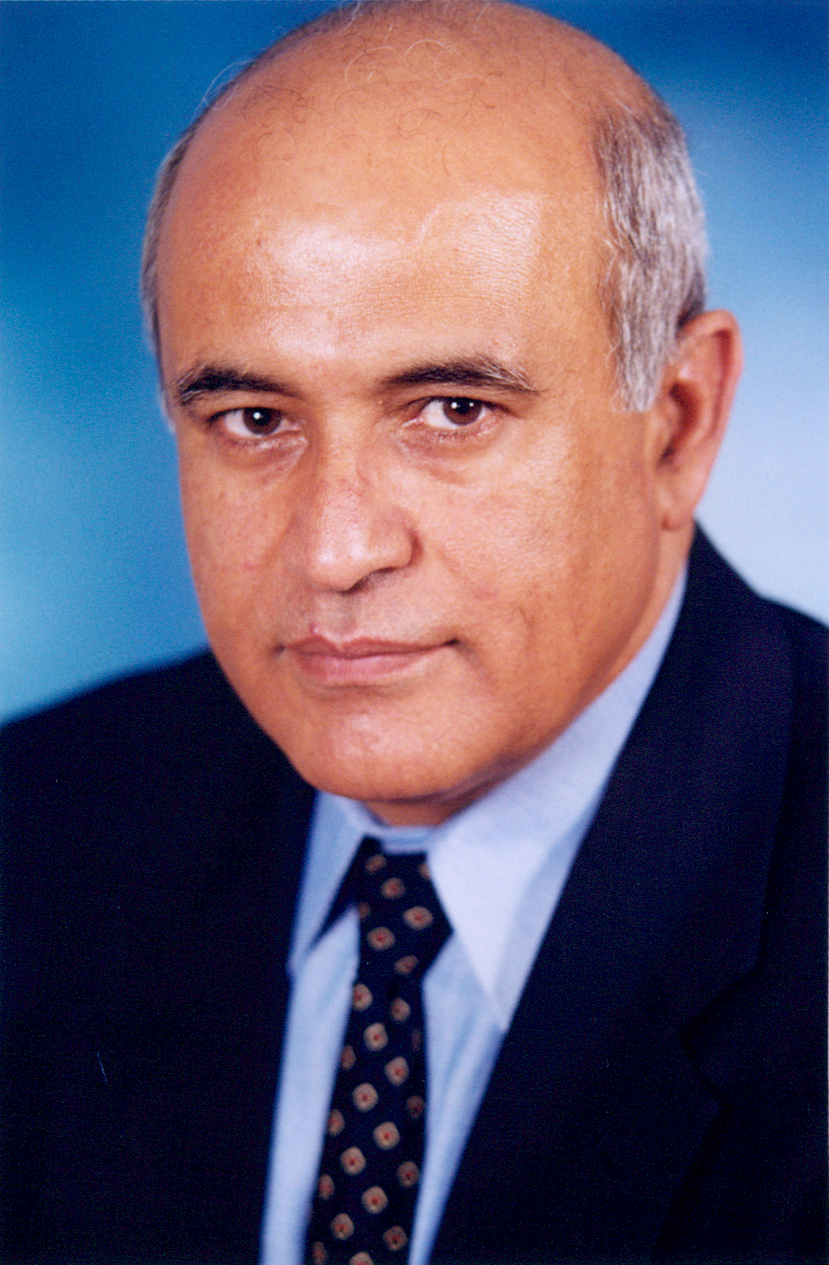

Minister of Internal Security
- In office 18 June 1996 – 6 July 1999
- Prime Minister: Benjamin Netanyahu
- Preceded by: Moshe Shahal
- Succeeded by: Shlomo Ben-Ami

Member of the Knesset
- In office 23 June 1992 – 17 May 1999

Personal details
- Born: 16 June 1944 (age 82) Ness Ziona, Israel
- Party: Third Way

Military service
- Allegiance: Israel
- Years of service: 1962–1992
- Rank: Brigadier General
- Commands: 77 Battalion; 7th Armored Brigade; 36th Division
- Battles/wars: Six-Day War; Yom Kippur War
- Awards: Medal of Valor; Distinguished Service Medal; President's Medal

Tat Aluf (Brigadier General) Avigdor Kahalani (Hebrew: אביגדור קהלני; born 16 June 1944) is an Israeli former soldier and politician.

== Early life ==
Avigdor Kahalani was born in Ness Ziona during the Mandate era. His parents, Moshe and Sarah Kahalani, were Yemenite-Jewish immigrants originally from Sanaa.

Kahalani studied mechanics at the ORT School in Jaffa. He gained a B.A. in History from Tel Aviv University and an M.A. in Political Science from Haifa University. He also attended the Command and General Staff College at Fort Leavenworth, Kansas, and graduated from Israel's National Defense College.

== Military career ==
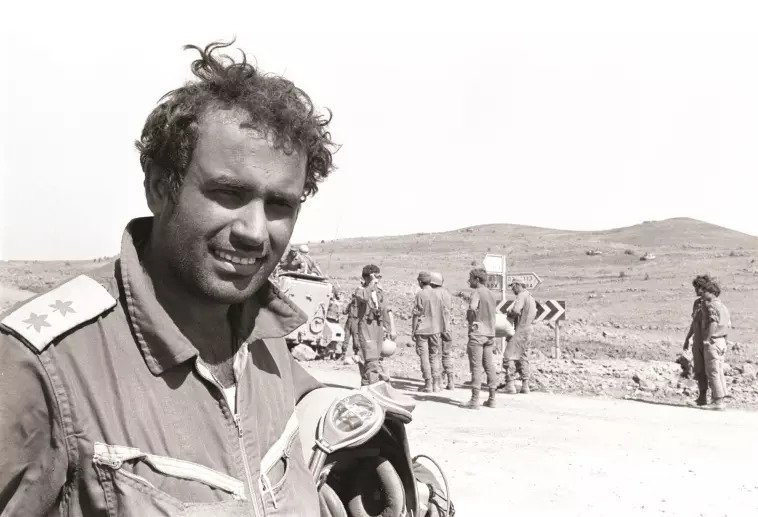
Kahalani during the Yom Kippur War

Kahalani was conscripted into the Israel Defense Forces (IDF) in 1962, and joined the 7th Brigade of the IDF Armored Corps. He started as a regular soldier, but later completed a tank commander's course with honors. He then completed an officer's course with honors at Bahad 1, and became a career officer in the IDF. In 1964, he was part of an IDF delegation to West Germany to receive the IDF's first M48 Patton tanks.

During the Six-Day War, Kahalani commanded a company of Patton tanks from the 79th Battalion. He was awarded the Medal of Distinguished Service for his service during the war, where he was badly wounded when his M-48 Patton caught fire.

When the Yom Kippur War broke out in 1973, Kahalani was a 29-year-old lieutenant colonel and battalion commander. He served as commander of the Centurion-equipped 77th Armored Battalion of the 7th Brigade on the Golan Heights. Kahalani's battalion – along with other elements of the 7th Armored Brigade – engaged in fierce defensive fighting against a vastly superior Syrian mechanized force of more than 50,000 men and 1,200 tanks. The battle proved to be one of the turning points of the war. After the war, the valley where it took place was littered with hundreds of destroyed and abandoned Syrian tanks and was renamed "Emek Ha-Bacha" ("Valley of Tears"). For his actions, Kahalani was awarded the highest Israeli military decoration, the Medal of Valor.

== Political career ==
After leaving the IDF, Kahalani made his way into politics. He served as Deputy Mayor of Tel Aviv, and was elected to the Knesset as a member of the Labor Party in the 1992 election. He served on the Knesset Foreign Affairs and Defense and the Education and Culture Committees. He was active in the Committee for the Rescue of Jews from Yemen and Chairman of the Golan Lobby in the Knesset, and was chairman of the Friends of LIBI Foundation and president of the Israeli Association for Drug Rehabilitation. He was a candidate in the 1993 Tel Aviv mayoral election, finishing second to Roni Milo with 42.5% of the vote.

During the Knesset session, Kahalani broke away from the Labor Party and founded The Third Way with Emanuel Zisman. The new party won four seats in the 1996 elections, and joined Benjamin Netanyahu's coalition, with Kahalani made Minister of Internal Security. However, in the 1999 elections the party failed to cross the electoral threshold and Kahalani lost his seat.

He later joined Likud, and was placed 43rd on the party's list for the 2003 elections, but missed out on a seat when the party won only 38.

From 2007 to 2015, Kahalani served as chairman of the Association for Wellbeing of Israeli Soldiers.

In 2023 he was chosen to light a torch at the beacon lighting ceremony on Mount Herzl on the occasion of the 75th year of the State of Israel.

== Published works ==
- The Heights of Courage: A Tank Leader's War on the Golan (1975)
- A Warrior's Way (1989)
