= Pini Shomer =

Israeli politician

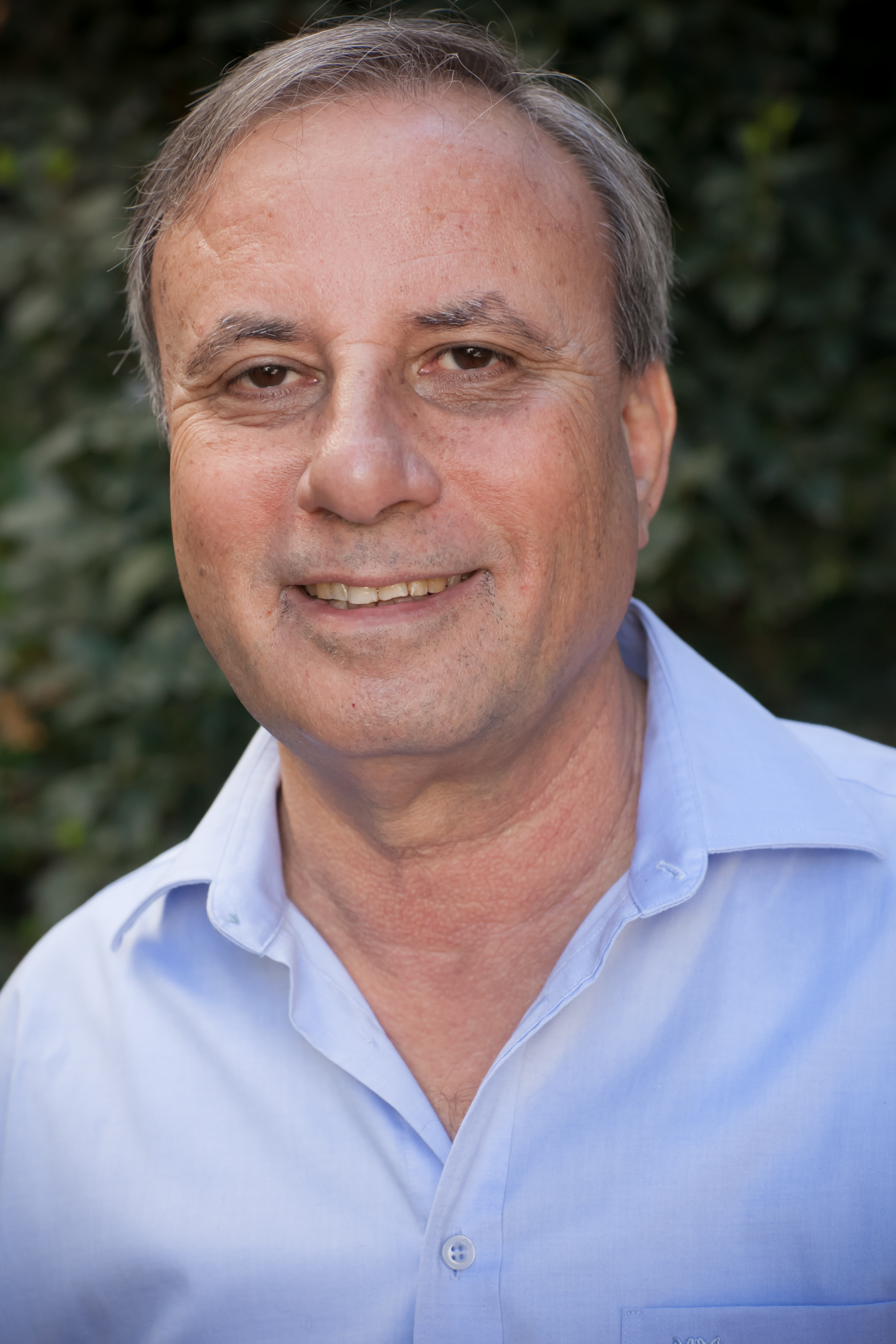
- Shomer in 2013

Faction represented in the Knesset
- 1996: Labor Party

Personal details
- Born: 19 October 1951 (age 73)

Pini Shomer (Hebrew: פיני שומר; born 19 October 1951) is an Israeli former politician, who briefly served as a member of the Knesset in 1996.

== Biography ==
A Histadrut manager, Shomer was on the Labor Party list for the 1992 Knesset elections. Although he failed to win a seat, he entered the Knesset on 28 May 1996 as a replacement for Avraham Katz-Oz. However, he lost his seat in the June elections, and did not even have time to take his oath of allegiance.

In 2001 he became CEO of the Ahdut pension fund, and currently heads the Avshalom Institute.
