= Eitan Cabel =

Israeli politician

- איתן כבל
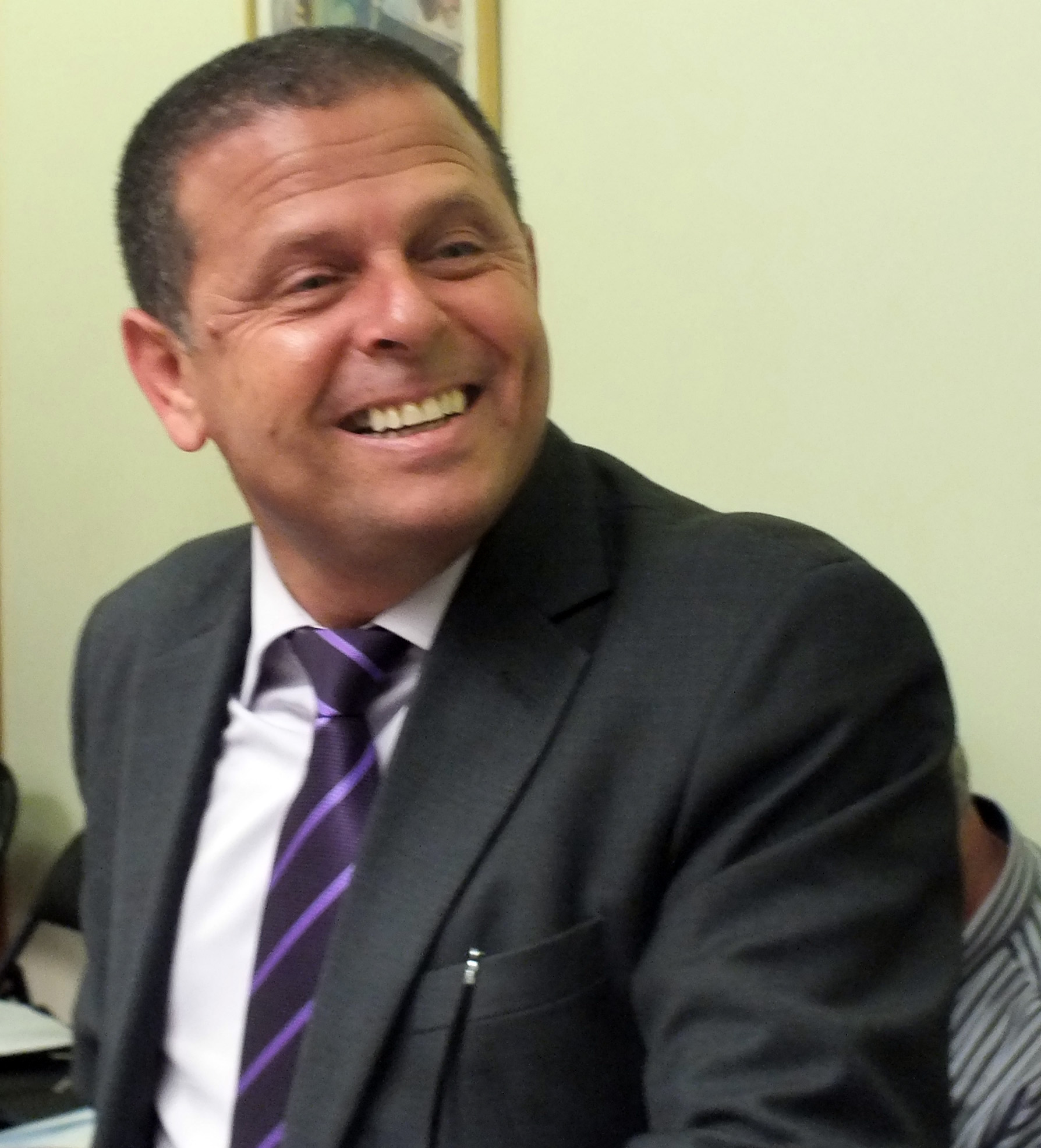

Ministerial roles
- 2006–2007: Minister without Portfolio

Faction represented in the Knesset
- 1996–1999: Labor Party
- 2001: One Israel
- 2001–2015: Labor Party
- 2015–2019: Zionist Union
- 2019: Labor Party

Personal details
- Born: 23 August 1959 (age 66); Rosh HaAyin, Israel

Eitan Cabel (Hebrew: איתן כבל; born 23 August 1959) is an Israeli politician who represented the Israeli Labor Party in the Knesset from 1996 to 2019.

== Biography ==
Eitan Cabel was born in Rosh HaAyin. After serving in the Israeli Defense Force, he studied at the Hebrew University of Jerusalem. He was president of the Students' Union.

He is married with 4 children.

== Political career ==
After his graduation he worked as an aide to Agriculture Minister Avraham Katz-Oz, Shimon Peres and Binyamin Ben-Eliezer.

He was first elected to the Knesset in 1996. In the past he served as the chairman of the Subcommittee for the Stock Market, the Economic Affairs Committee, and as the chairman of the Lobby for the Promotion of Culture and Art in Israel. He also served as a member of the House Committee and the Foreign Affairs & Defense Committee, as well the Lobby for Reserve Soldiers and the Social-Environmental Lobby.

In 2007 he resigned his position as Minister without Portfolio, and told Ehud Olmert to resign as well. He said "I can no longer sit in a government headed by Ehud Olmert." He resigned after the Winograd Commission released a report that blamed Olmert and other members of the Israeli government as being responsible for the failures of the Second Lebanon War.

Cabel retained his seat in the 2009 elections, having been placed seventh on the party's list. In that tenure, he initiated a law that put a limit on call center waiting.

On July 21, 2015, Cabel received the Israel Democracy Institute's Outstanding Parliamentarian Award along with MK Aliza Lavie of the Yesh Atid party for their "exemplary parliamentary activity in 2014."

Following a clash with then Labor party leader, Avi Gabbay, in 2019, Cabel was placed at the 15th slot of the party slate and failed to retain his seat in the elections for the 21st Knesset.
