= Rafi Elul =

Israeli politician

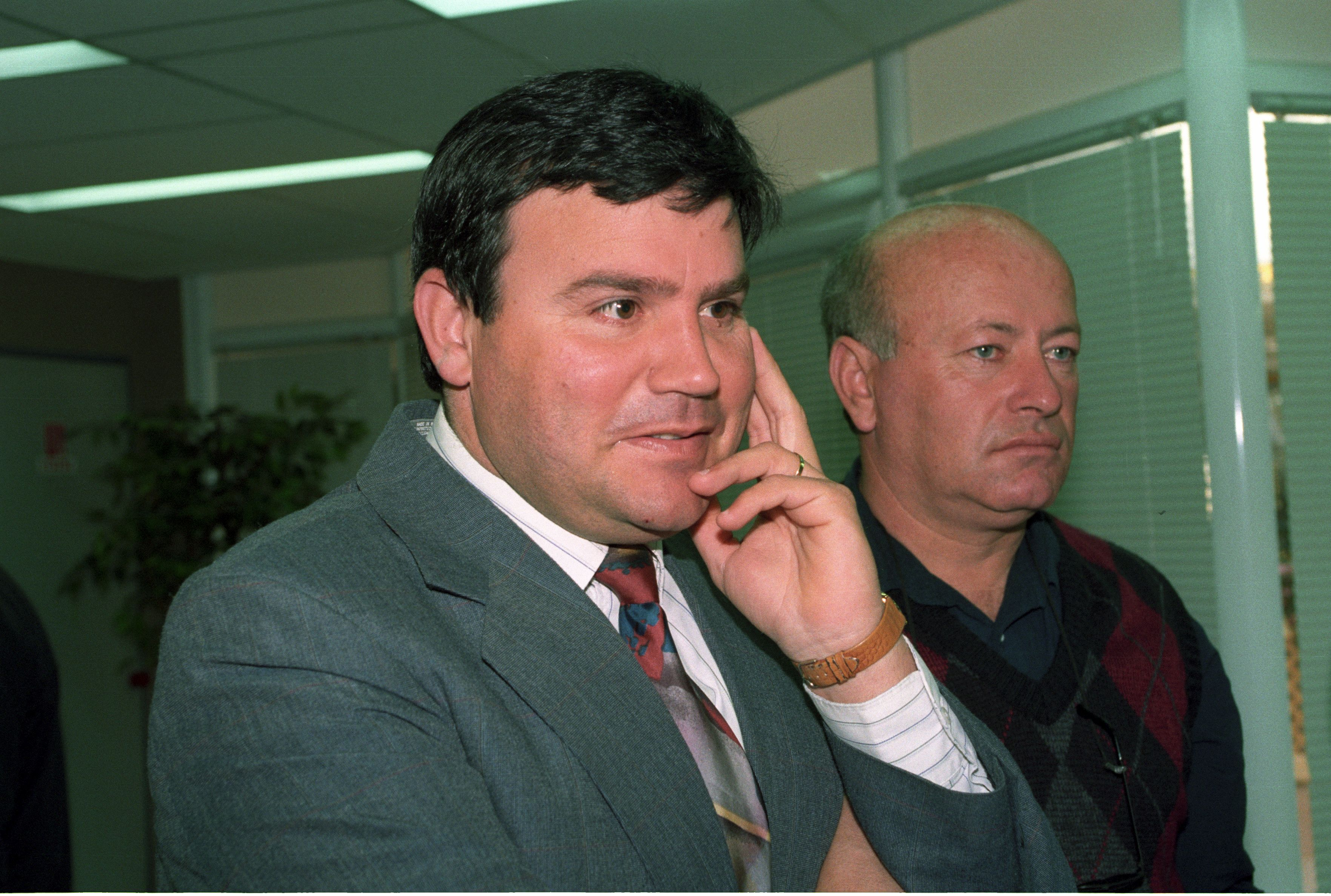
- Elul in 1993

Faction represented in the Knesset
- 1992–1996: Labor Party

Personal details
- Born: 23 September 1957 (age 69) Morocco

Rafael "Rafi" Elul (Hebrew: רפאל "רפי" אלול; born 23 September 1957) is an Israeli former politician who served as a member of the Knesset for the Labor Party between 1992 and 1996.

== Biography ==
Born in Morocco, Elul made aliyah in 1961 at the age of four. He gained a BA in political science and sociology and an MA in business administration, both from Bar-Ilan University. He also took courses in local government studies and public administration, and worked in the country's civil service.

In 1989 he became mayor of Mazkeret Batya, a position he held until 1994. He was first elected to the Knesset in 1992. After re-election in 1996 he served as chairman of the Public Petitions Committee. He lost his seat in the 1999 elections. He later joined Kadima, and was 47th on the party's list for the 2006 elections. For the 2009 elections he was 106th.

Elul has also served as chairman of the Movement for Combating Poverty and the Friends of Kaplan Medical Center association, and is a former member of the Second Broadcasting Authority, which ran Channel 2.
