= Eliyahu Gabai =

Israeli politician

- אליהו גבאי
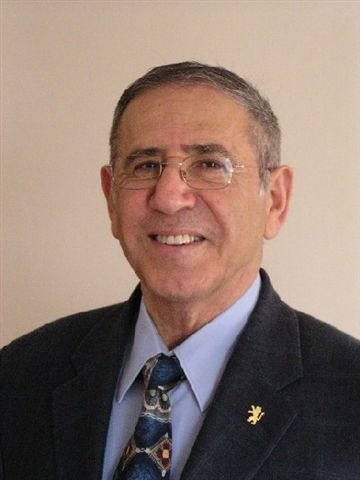

Faction represented in the Knesset
- 1996–1999: National Religious Party
- 2006–2009: National Religious Party

Personal details
- Born: 5 January 1943 (age 83) Baghdad, Iraq

Eliyahu "Eli" Gabai (Hebrew: אליהו "אלי" גבאי; born 5 January 1943) is an Israeli former politician. He served as a member of the Knesset for the National Religious Party from 1996 until 1999, and again from 2006 until 2009. In 2017, he received the Yakir Yerushalayim award.

== Biography ==
Gabai was born in Baghdad, Iraq and emigrated with his family in 1951. They settled in Pardes Hanna and he studied at the Mikveh Israel agricultural school. He later served with the IDF and studied at Kfar HaRoeh's Bnei Akiva teachers seminary. Gabai went on to gain a BA in educational administration and political science at Bar-Ilan University and began his MA studies in public administration.

He began working as a teacher in Ashkelon in 1971, and by 1992 had held the posts of headteacher in Jerusalem, head of the education and culture division of Mevaseret Zion local council, national supervisor for welfare in the national-religious education division with the Ministry of Education, and also becoming director general of an organization for communal education within the Ministry.

In 1993, Gabai entered politics and was nominated for Jerusalem's city council. He served as Chairman of the Education Committee and a member of the municipality's executive in charge of tourism and industry. In 1996 he was appointed mayor of Lakiya local council for a year the Minister of Internal Affairs. In 1997 he returned to his posts in Jerusalem, and was appointed Deputy Mayor, holding the portfolios for civil engineering and public transport.

He was on the National Religious Party list for the 1996 elections, but failed to win a seat. However, he entered the Knesset on 20 January 1998 as a replacement for the deceased Zevulun Hammer. He lost his seat in the 1999 elections, but returned to the Knesset after the 2006 elections. He lost his seat again in the 2009 elections.

In 1982 he founded Hibba: The Israeli Heritage Movement which is currently chaired by Yonah Betzaleli. Since its founding, Hibba has been a leader in strengthening Jewish identity through educational, social and cultural programming. Hibba has been a Birthright provider since 2002 and has brought thousands of young Jews to Israel. The Hibba Center, located in the heart of Jerusalem, will be the hub of Hibba's extended programming, which will touch Jews of all ages around the world.

Gabai is married and a father of three. His son, Yair, served as a member of Jerusalem city council between 2003 and 2013.
