= Eli Ben-Menachem =

Israeli politician (born 1947)

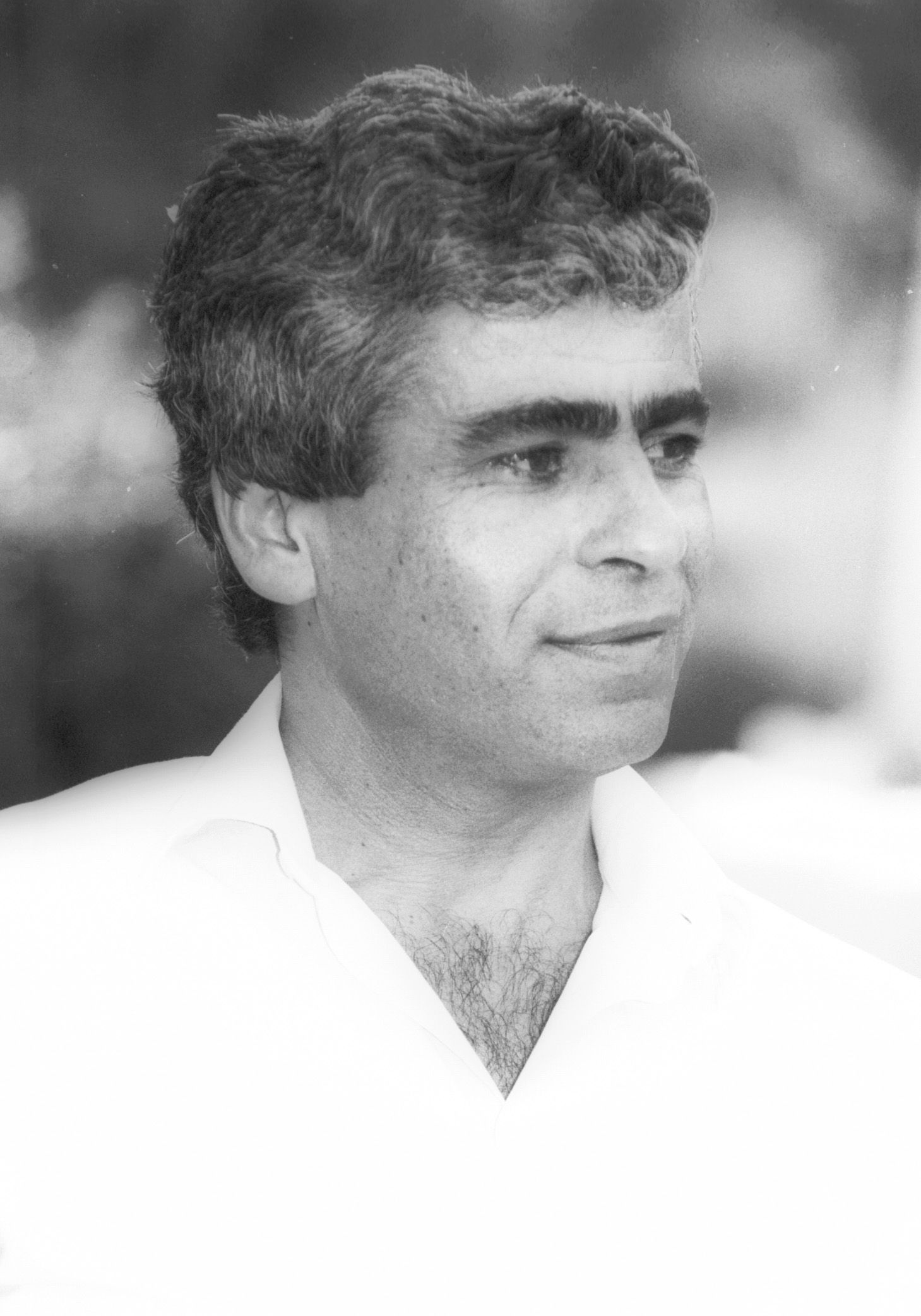
- Ben-Menachem in 1989

Faction represented in the Knesset
- 1988–1991: Alignment
- 1991–1999: Labor Party
- 1999–2001: One Israel
- 2001–2006: Labor Party

Personal details
- Born: 24 November 1947 (age 78) Bombay, India

Eli Ben-Menachem (Hebrew: אלי בן-מנחם; born 24 November 1947) is an Israeli former politician. He served as a member of the Knesset for the Alignment, the Labor Party and One Israel between 1988 and 2006.

== Biography ==
Born in Bombay, India (today Mumbai), Ben-Menachem emigrated to Israel in 1949. He studied at a military academy, and worked as an aircraft technician, eventually becoming chairman of the El Al workers' union.

In 1988 he was elected to the Knesset on the Alignment list. After being re-elected in 1992 (this time on the Labor Party list), he was appointed Deputy Minister in the Prime Minister's Office on 4 August 1992. On 8 April 1993 he became Deputy Minister of Housing and Construction, a post he held until Binyamin Netanyahu formed a Likud-led government in 1996. Following the 1996 elections, Ben-Menachem became chairman of the committee on Drug Abuse.

He was placed 27th on the One Israel list (an alliance of Labor, Gesher and Meimad) for the May 1999 elections, and lost his seat when the alliance won only 26 mandates. However, he re-entered the Knesset when Yossi Beilin resigned his seat in November that year. When Ariel Sharon formed a government of national unity in March 2001, he was appointed Deputy Minister of Industry and Trade, serving until Labor withdrew from the coalition in November 2002.

He retained his seat in the 2003 elections and became a Deputy Speaker of the Knesset. During Labor's stint in the Ariel Sharon government between January and November 2005, Ben-Menachem was re-appointed Deputy Minister of Housing and Construction.

After losing the slot on Labor's list reserved for the representative of poor neighbourhoods to Yoram Marciano, he left the party and joined Kadima. He lost his seat in the 2006 elections and became head of the Kadima faction in the Histadrut. He was placed 48th on the Kadima list for the 2009 elections, failing to win a seat.
