= Abdulmalik Dehamshe =

Israeli Arab former politician

- عبد المالك دهامشة
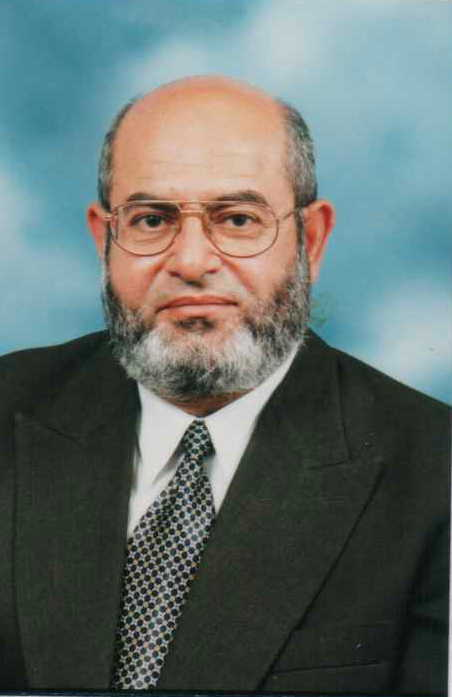
- Dehamshe during his time in the Knesset

Faction represented in the Knesset
- 1996–2006: United Arab List

Personal details
- Born: 4 March 1943 (age 83) Kafr Kanna, Mandatory Palestine

Abdulmalik Dehamshe (Arabic: عبد المالك دهامشة, Hebrew: עבד-אלמאלכ דהאמשה; born 4 March 1943) is an Israeli Arab former politician who served as a member of the Knesset for the United Arab List between 1996 and 2006. He was also leader of the party.

== Biography ==
Born in Kafr Kanna during the Mandate era, Dehamshe completed his secondary education in Nazareth. He earned a BA at the Hebrew University of Jerusalem in 1968 and worked as a lawyer.

In 1996 he was elected to the Knesset on the Arab Democratic Party–United Arab List joint list. He was re-elected in 1999 and became a Deputy Speaker of the Knesset. In 1998 he said "Any Arab who serves in the Israeli Army is a disgusting criminal. We reject all forms of military service because we are part of the Palestinian people." After an Israeli airstrike killed three Syrian soldiers, he sent a letter of condolences to Syrian President Bashar al-Assad, and wrote the return address as "Nazareth, Palestine". In 2003 the Or Commission found that he had been responsible for inflaming violence during the October 2000 events.

He retained his seat again in the 2003 Knesset elections and remained a Deputy Speaker. He lost his seat in the 2006 elections. In the same year he expressed his support for suicide bombings, the use of Qassam rockets on Israeli population centers, and kidnappings of Israelis by Palestinian militants.
