= Yossi Katz =

Israeli politician

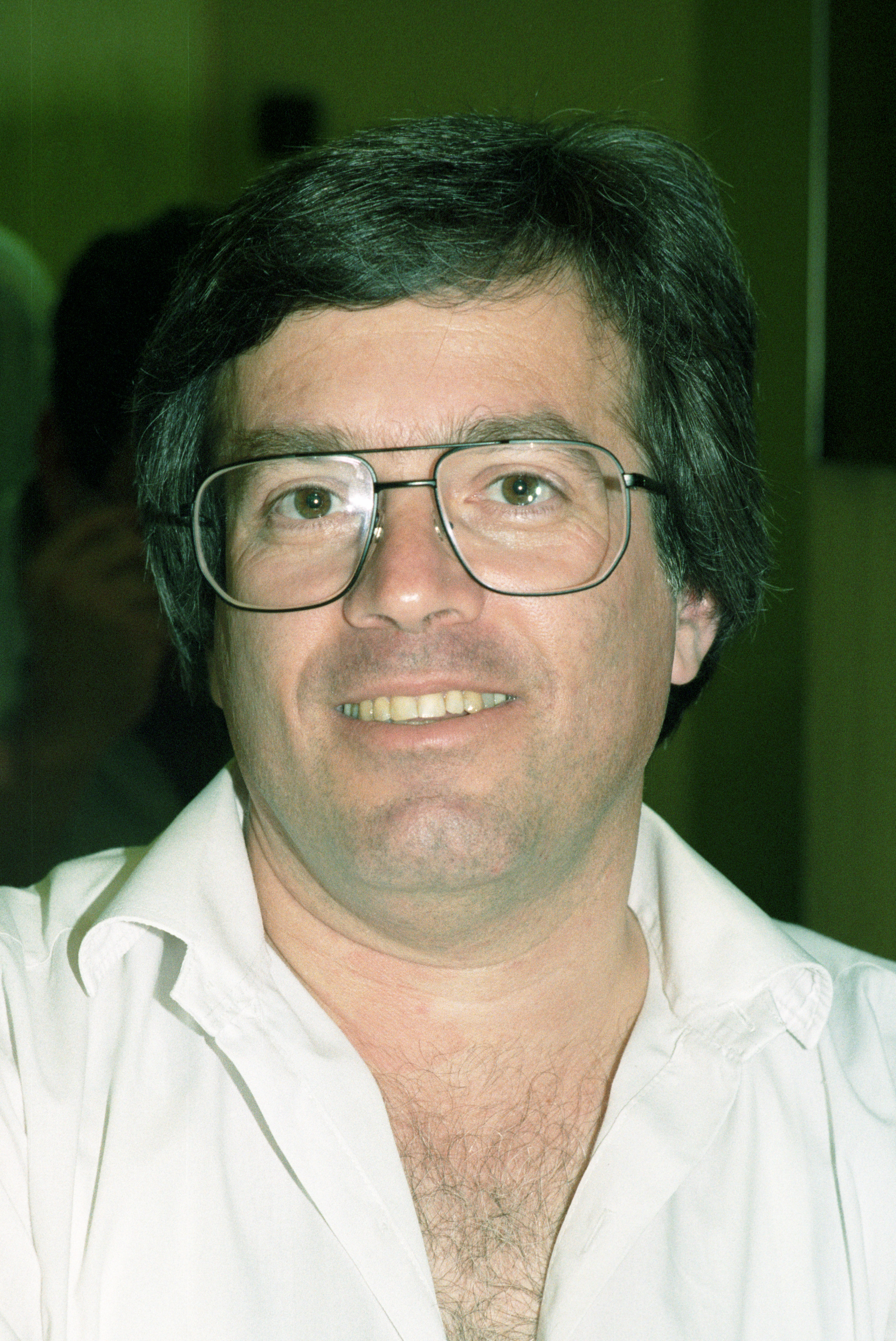
- Katz in 1992

Faction represented in the Knesset
- 1992–1999: Labor Party
- 1999–2001: One Israel
- 2001–2003: Labor Party

Personal details
- Born: 19 August 1949 (age 75); Haifa, Israel

Yossi Katz (Hebrew: יוסי כץ; born 19 August 1949) is an Israeli former politician who served as a member of the Knesset for the Labor Party and One Israel between 1992 and 2003.

== Biography ==
Born in Haifa, Katz studied law at the Hebrew University of Jerusalem, gaining an LLB and LLM, before working as a lawyer. He became the Histadrut's legal advisor in the Haifa area, and was a member of the union's committee for labour legislation. He also served on Kiryat Tiv'on's local council.

In 1992 he was elected to the Knesset on the Labor Party list, and was appointed chairman of the Labor and Welfare Committee. He was re-elected in 1996, after which he chaired the State Control committee. After being re-elected for a second time in 1999 (this time as the 25th-placed candidate on the One Israel alliance list), he chaired the House Committee, as well as the Special Legislative Committee for Not Renewing the Emergency Situation and the Special Committee for Discussion of the Security Service Law. During his time in the Knesset he was also an observer on the Council of Europe.

Katz lost his seat in the 2003 elections.

In 2014 he was suggested as a candidate for a judge at the National Labor Court but did not get the position.
