= Shmuel Halpert =

Israeli politician (born 1939)

- שמואל הלפרט
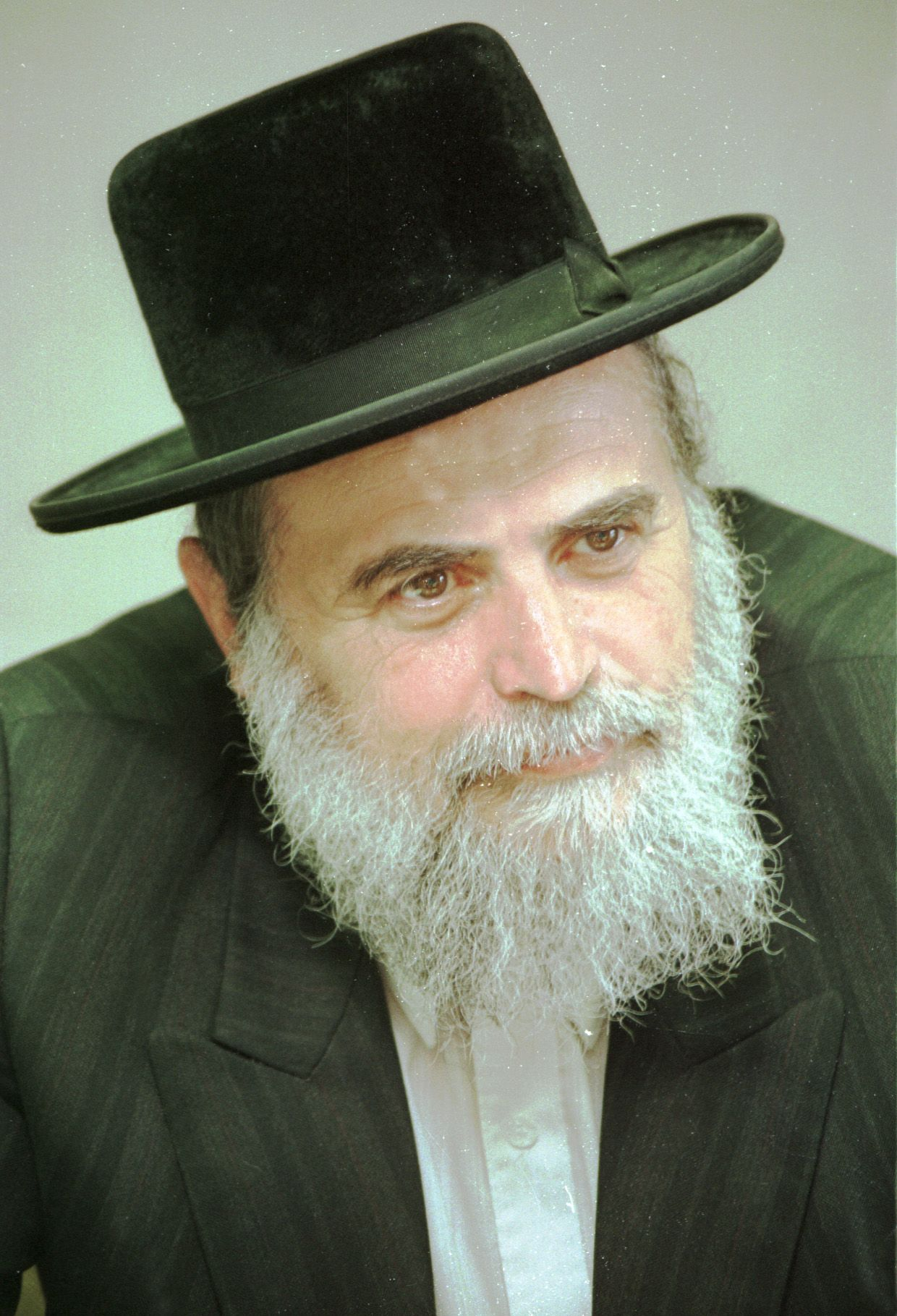

Faction represented in the Knesset
- 1981–1984: Agudat Yisrael
- 1988–1992: Agudat Yisrael
- 1992–1994: United Torah Judaism
- 1996–1999: United Torah Judaism
- 1999: Agudat Yisrael
- 1999–2003: United Torah Judaism
- 2005–2006: Agudat Yisrael
- 2006–2008: United Torah Judaism
- 2008–2009: Agudat Yisrael

Personal details
- Born: 5 February 1939 (age 87) Cluj, Romania

Rabbi Shmuel Halpert (Hebrew: שמואל הלפרט; born 5 February 1939) is an Israeli politician and a former member of the Knesset for the Haredi party Agudat Yisrael (in which he represents the Vizhnitz Hasidim), part of the United Torah Judaism alliance. He is also a member of the party's central committee, and a member of the executive of World Agudat Israel.

== Biography ==
Born in Cluj in Romania in 1939, Halpert is the grandson of Rabbi Mordechai of Nadvirna and Rabbi Yisroel Yaakov of Khust. He studied at the Vyzhnytsia Institute of Talmudic Studies, and was ordained as a rabbi. He made aliyah in 1960.

Halpert was first elected to the Knesset in the 1981 elections on the Agudat Israel list. He lost his seat in the next elections in 1984.

He re-entered the Knesset after the 1988 elections, and was appointed Deputy Minister in the Prime Minister's Office in November 1990. In June 1991, he became Deputy Minister of Labour and Social Welfare.

For the 1992 elections, Agudat Israel formed an alliance with Degel HaTorah, which included a seat rotation agreement. Halpert was elected to the Knesset, but served only half a term (until 1994) as part of the arrangement. He retained his seat served full terms after the 1996 and 1999 elections, and lost it in the 2003 elections. After United Torah Judaism split towards the end of the Knesset term in 2005, Yisrael Eichler resigned as an MK, and was replaced by Halpert as part of another rotation agreement. Halpert was also appointed Deputy Minister of Transportation.

For the 2006 elections, the alliance was reformed, and Halpert was elected to the Knesset on the UTJ list. Like many other religious politicians in Israel, he objected to the 2006 Jerusalem gay pride parade, asking, "Have we become like Sodom? Let go of this ugliness. It will oust the divine presence." He also caused controversy when he supported corporal punishment and said during a Knesset committee meeting that he hit to his own children and calling for the separation of the sexes in the Western Wall Plaza.

He lost his seat in the 2009 elections.
