= Avraham Leizerson =

Israeli politician

- אברהם לייזרזון
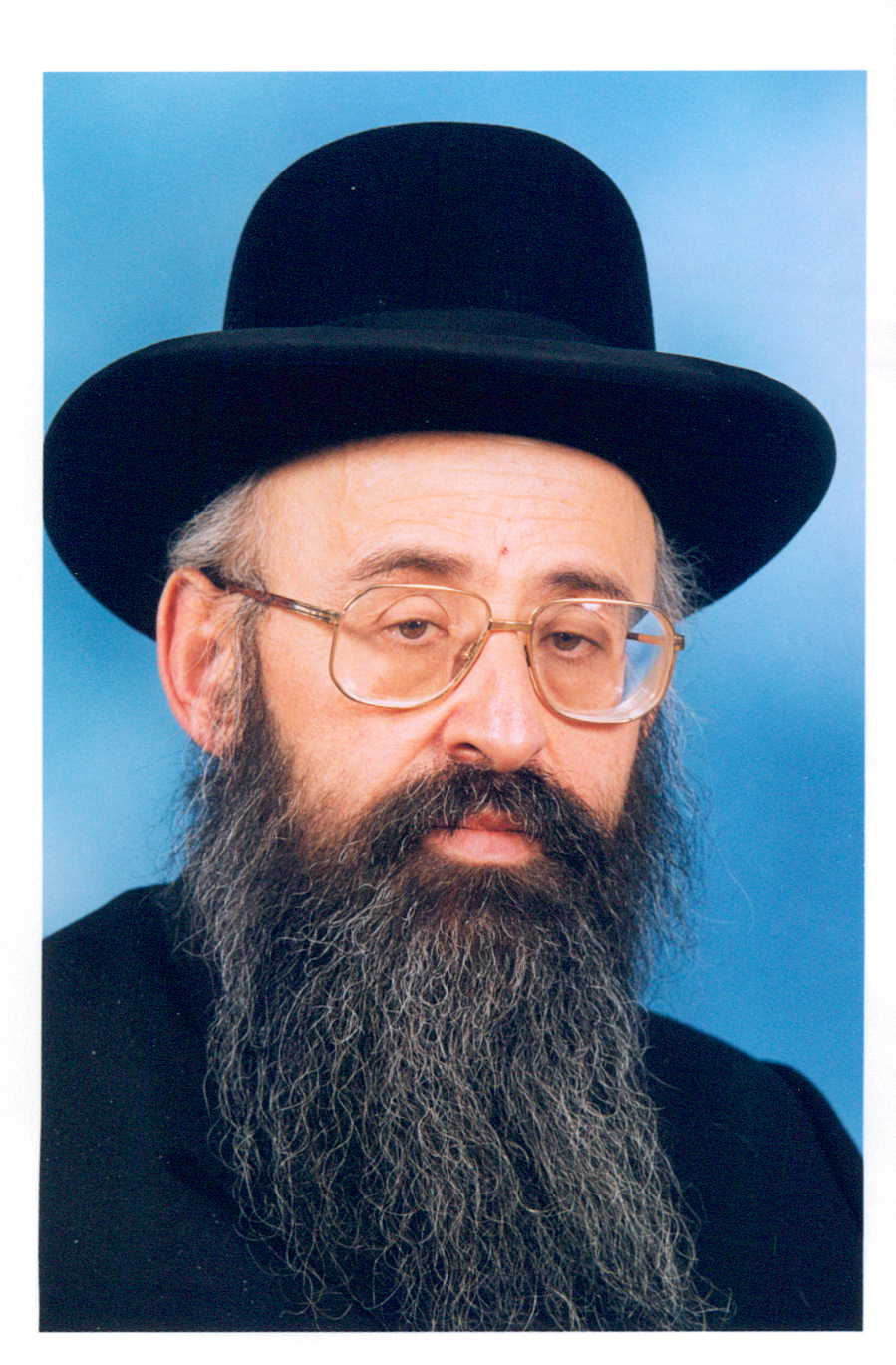

Faction represented in the Knesset
- 1998–1999: United Torah Judaism
- 1999: Agudat Yisrael

Personal details
- Born: 1943; Jerusalem, Mandatory Palestine

Rabbi Avraham Yosef Leizerson (Hebrew: אברהם יוסף לייזרזון; born 1943, died 2020) was an Israeli politician and Member of the Knesset for the ultra-orthodox party Agudat Yisrael, part of the United Torah Judaism alliance. He was also chair of Chinuch Atzmai, the independent Orthodox educational system.

== Biography ==
Born in Jerusalem in the British Mandate of Palestine, Leizerson is the nephew of Rabbi Shlomo Zalman Auerbach and a seventh generation in his family to live in Jerusalem. He holds an academic degree and was ordained as a Rabbi.

Leizerson served as a spokesperson for Agudat Yisrael and elected on its behalf to the religious council of Jerusalem. He was later a member of the city council, serving as deputy mayor. Other positions he has held include him being deputy director general of the independent orthodox education system and a member of the presidium of the commission for the protection of human dignity.

Leizerson entered the Knesset on 23 October 1998, due to a rotation agreement and the resignation of Moshe Gafni from the Knesset. He was not registered for reelection to the Fifteenth Knesset, held in 1999. Following his term at the Knesset he began serving as chairman of the independent orthodox education system.
