= Emanuel Zisman =

Israeli politician (1935–2009)

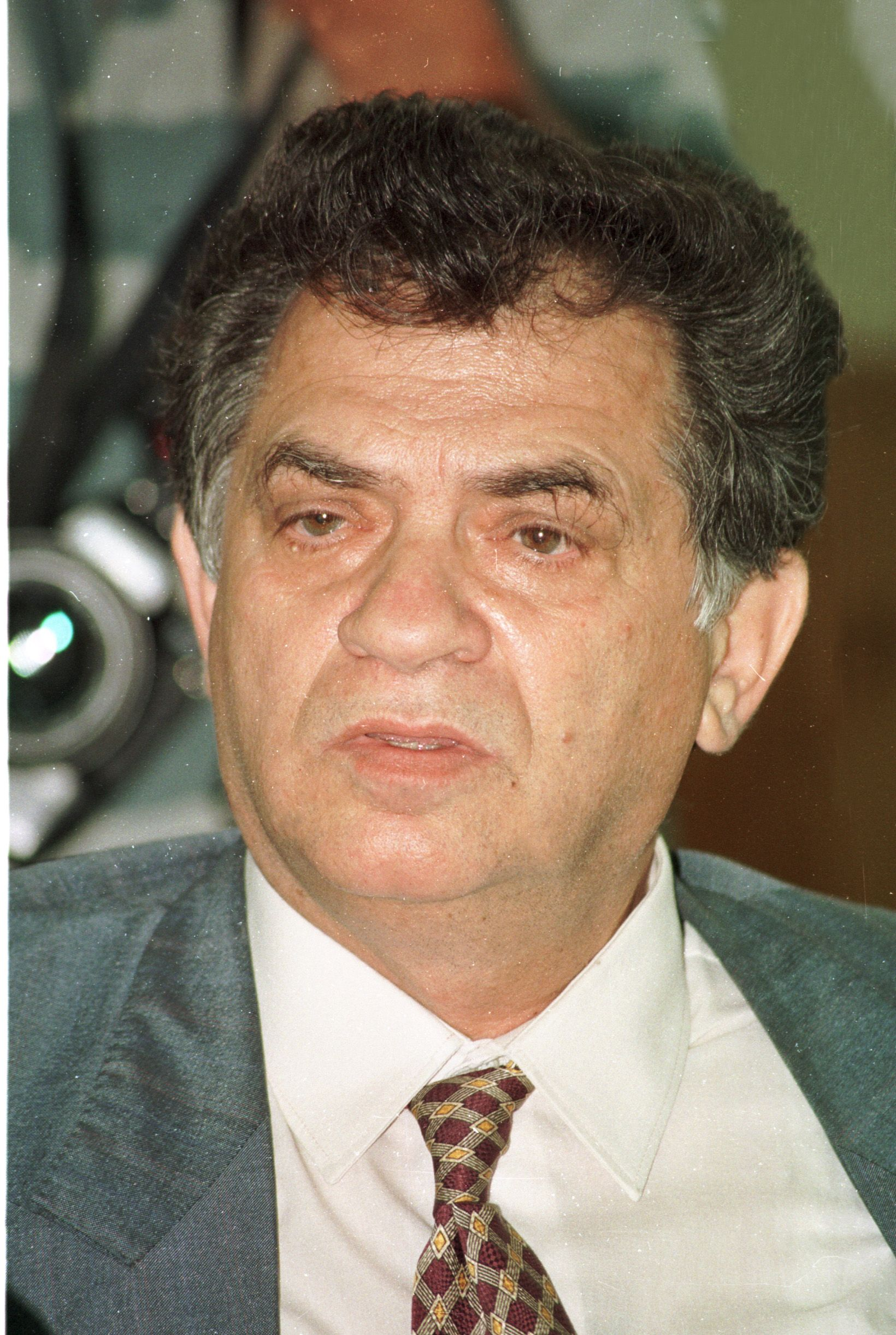
- Zisman in 1995

Faction represented in the Knesset
- 1988–1991: Alignment
- 1991–1996: Labor Party
- 1996–1999: Third Way
- 1999: Independent

Personal details
- Born: 11 February 1935 Plovdiv, Bulgaria
- Died: 11 November 2009 (aged 74)

Emanuel Zisman (Bulgarian: Емануел Зисман, Hebrew: עמנואל זיסמן; 11 February 1935 – 11 November 2009) was an Israeli politician and ambassador. He served as a member of the Knesset between 1988 and 1999.

== Biography ==
Zisman was born in Plovdiv in Bulgaria. On 10 March 1943 the Jewish community of Plovdiv, including Zisman and his mother and sister, were rounded up for deportation in the Jewish quarter of the city, near the school. In the wake of public pressure Tsar Boris III cancelled the order. Zisman later emigrated to newly independent Israel in 1949. Married to Sara with three children, he lived in the Nayot neighborhood of Jerusalem.

=== Political career ===
Zisman was a member of Jerusalem city council and served as the Labor Party's chairman in the Jerusalem region. He was first elected to the Knesset on the Alignment list in 1988, and was re-elected in 1992, by which time the Alignment had merged into the Labor Party.

On 7 March 1996 Zisman and Avigdor Kahlani left the Labor Party to form the Third Way. The new party won four seats in the elections that year, and joined Benjamin Netanyahu's government. On 29 March 1999 Zisman left the party to serve the rest of the term as an independent MK. He lost his seat in the May 1999 elections.

In October 2000 he was appointed Ambassador to Bulgaria, a post he held until 2002.

== Awards ==
- In 2006, Zisman received the Yakir Yerushalayim (Worthy Citizen of Jerusalem) award from the city of Jerusalem.
