= Doron Shmueli =

Israeli politician

- דורון שמואלי
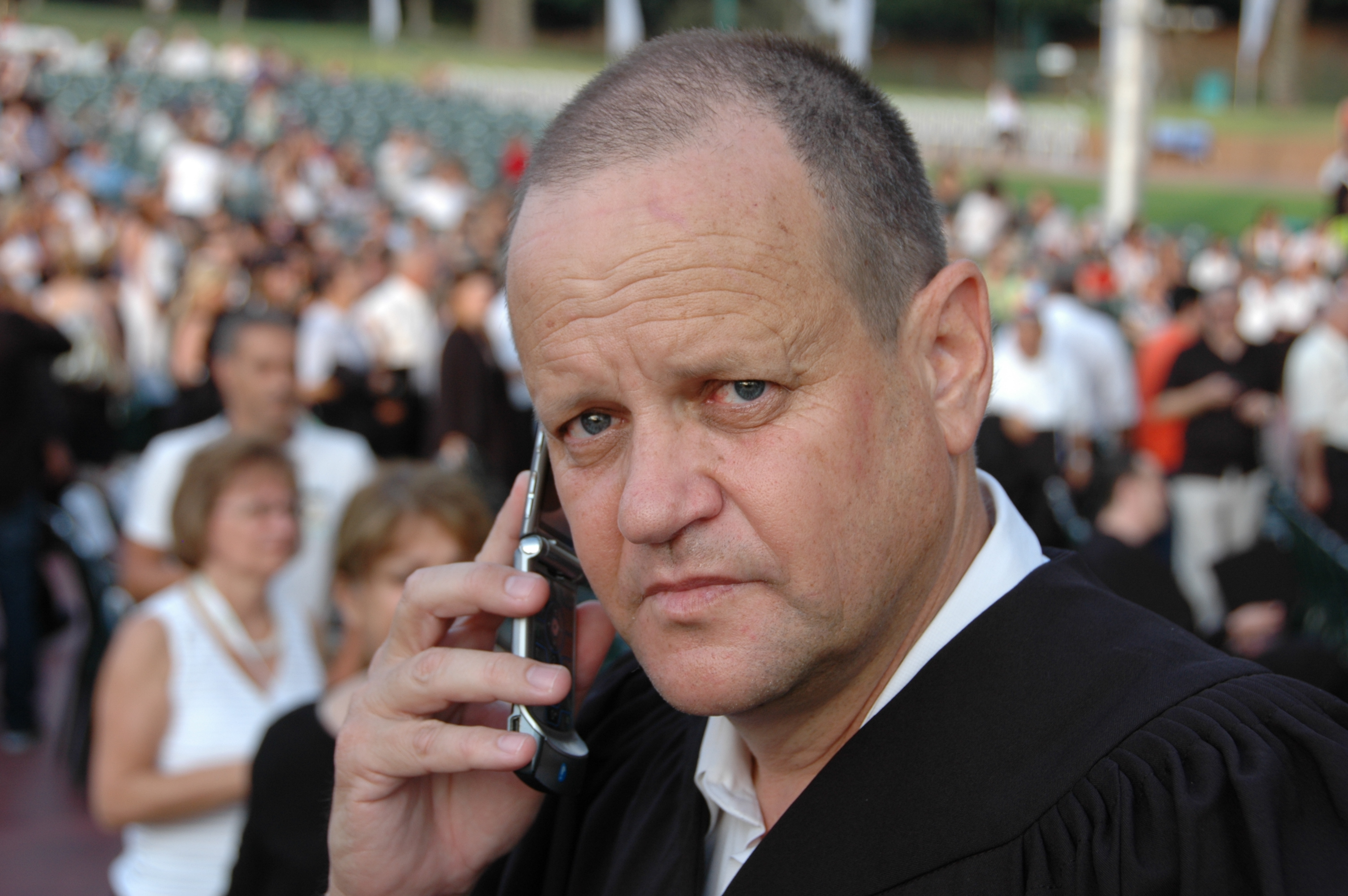

Faction represented in the Knesset
- 1998–1999: Likud

Personal details
- Born: 5 October 1954 (age 71) Israel

Doron Shmueli (Hebrew: דורון שמואלי; born 5 October 1954) is a former Israeli politician who served as a member of the Knesset for Likud between November 1998 and June 1999.

== Biography ==
Shmueli attended Meir Shfeya agricultural high school, before gaining an LLB at university.

Between 1974 and 1977 he was a member of the Golan Settlements Committee, before serving as treasurer and co-ordinator of Ein Vered moshav between 1977 and 1984. He has also served as treasurer of Eliad moshav.

From 1984 until 1992 he owned a company importing and exporting agricultural supplies, before becoming director-general of Tzomet in 1992, a position he held until 1996. Between 1996 and 1998 he worked as chairman of the Citrus Fruit Marketing Board.

In the 1996 Knesset elections he missed out on a seat, but entered the Knesset on 30 November 1998 as a replacement for Pini Badash, who following a new law, had to resign in order to remain head of Omer local council. Following the split of the Likud-Gesher-Tzomet alliance, Shmueli represented Likud. He was placed thirty-second on the Likud list for the 1999 elections, but the party won only 19 seats and Shmueli lost his seat.

In 2001, he was appointed agricultural advisor to Prime Minister Ariel Sharon.
