= Yehuda Harel =

Israeli politician

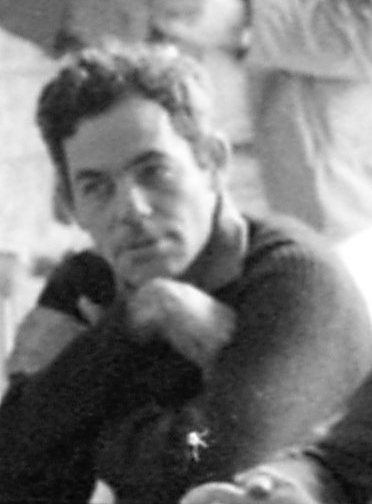
- Harel in 1969

Faction represented in the Knesset
- 1996–1999: The Third Way

Personal details
- Born: 11 November 1934 (age 91) Berlin, Germany

Yehuda Harel (Hebrew: יהודה הראל; born 11 November 1934) is an Israeli former politician who served as a member of the Knesset for the Third Way between 1996 and 1999.

== Biography ==
Harel was born in Berlin in 1934 and his family emigrated to Mandatory Palestine the following year. He studied philosophy and history at Tel Aviv University and was the secretary of the Mahanot Olim youth movement. He joined kibbutz Menara, becoming its secretary. He also served as secretary of the Committee of Golan Settlements. Harel was one of the founders of kibbutz Merom Golan. Harel was a socialist and profoundly influenced by Karl Marx, Vladimir Lenin and Rosa Luxemburg. As manager of the Yad Tabenkin Institute, he explored ways to save the Kibbutz Movement from bankruptcy and concluded that capitalism was the only way to achieve this.

Harel served as a personal aide to Yitzhak Rabin. In 1996, he was a founding member of the Third Way party, and was elected to the Knesset on its list that year. He served as the party's parliamentary group chairman, and was third on the party's list for the 1999 elections. However, the party failed to cross the electoral threshold and Harel lost his seat.
