= Pini Badash =

Israeli politician

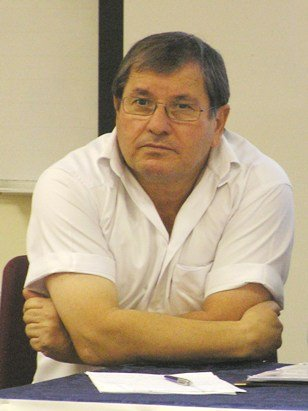
- Badash in 2008

Faction represented in the Knesset
- 1992–1998: Tzomet

Personal details
- Born: 29 August 1952 (age 73) Gilat, Israel

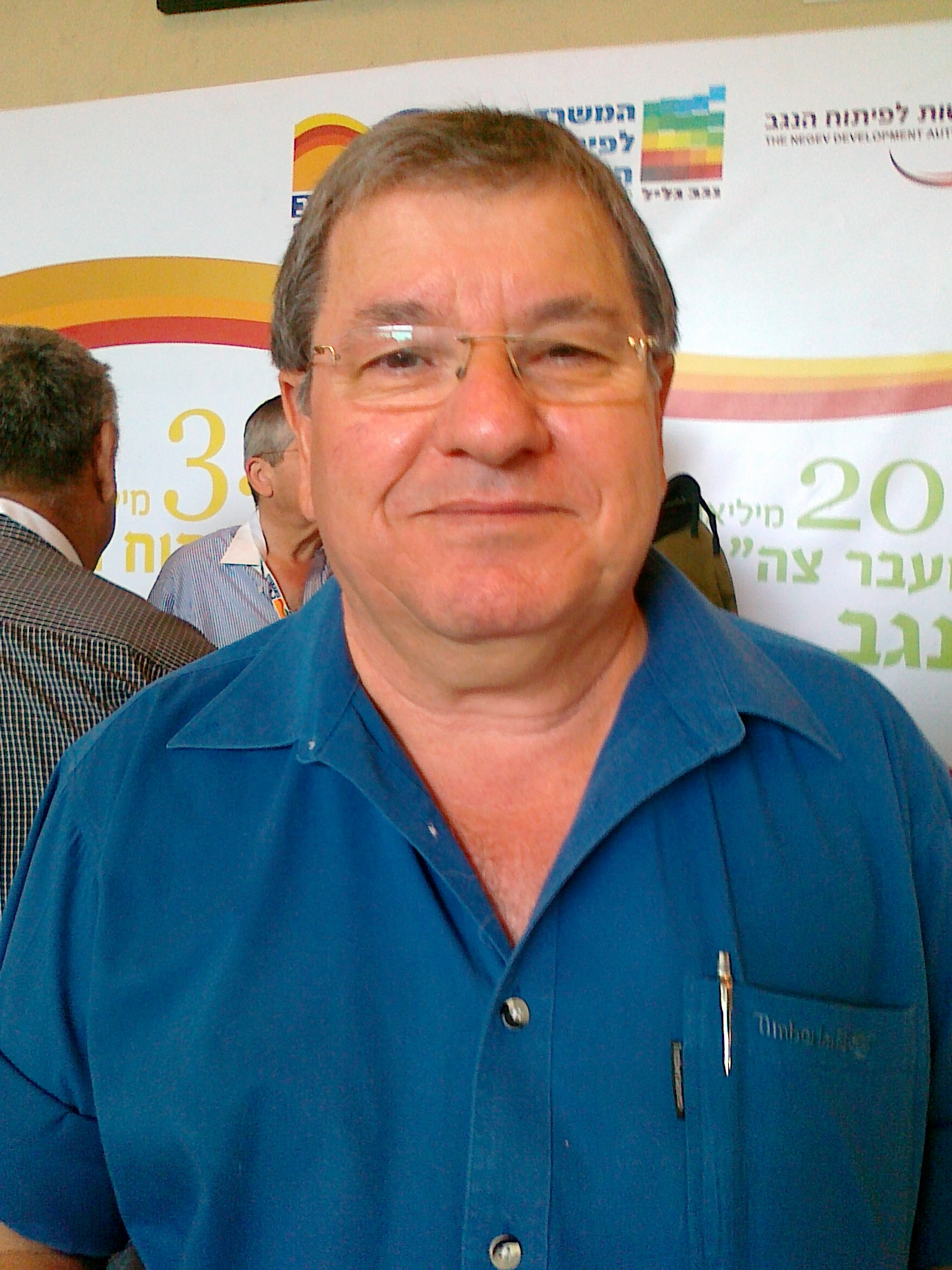
Badash in 2012

Pinhas "Pini" Badash (Hebrew: פנחס "פיני" בדש; born 29 August 1952) is an Israeli politician was a member of the Knesset for Tzomet between 1992 and 1998 and the mayor of Omer local council from 1990 to 2024.

== Early life ==
Born in moshav Gilat, Badash studied mechanical engineering at the Negev University, graduating in 1979. He finished a master's degree in administration in 2001.

== Career ==
A member of the Tzomet secretariat and chairman of its finance committee, Badash became head of Omer local council in 1990. He was elected to the Knesset on the party's list in 1992. Chairman of the Israel-China Parliamentary Friendship League, he was re-elected in 1996. He resigned his seat on 30 November 1998 after a new law was passed preventing Knesset members from simultaneously acting as mayors or council heads, and was replaced by Doron Shmueli.

Badash remained head of Omer local council until 2024, and has also served as a member of the Authority for Developing the Negev and chairman of the Local Authority Committee for Developing the Negev and the Negev Lobby. Justifying the use of Admissions Committees in the Negev, Badash has described Bedouin Arabs as "Termites", adding "on a day of reckoning and at a time of crisis they are the enemy". He did not run in the subsequent elections and retired after 34 years as mayor of Omer. His nephew, Erez Badash, was elected to the position.
