= Zvi Weinberg =

Israeli politician (1935–2006)

- צבי ויינברג
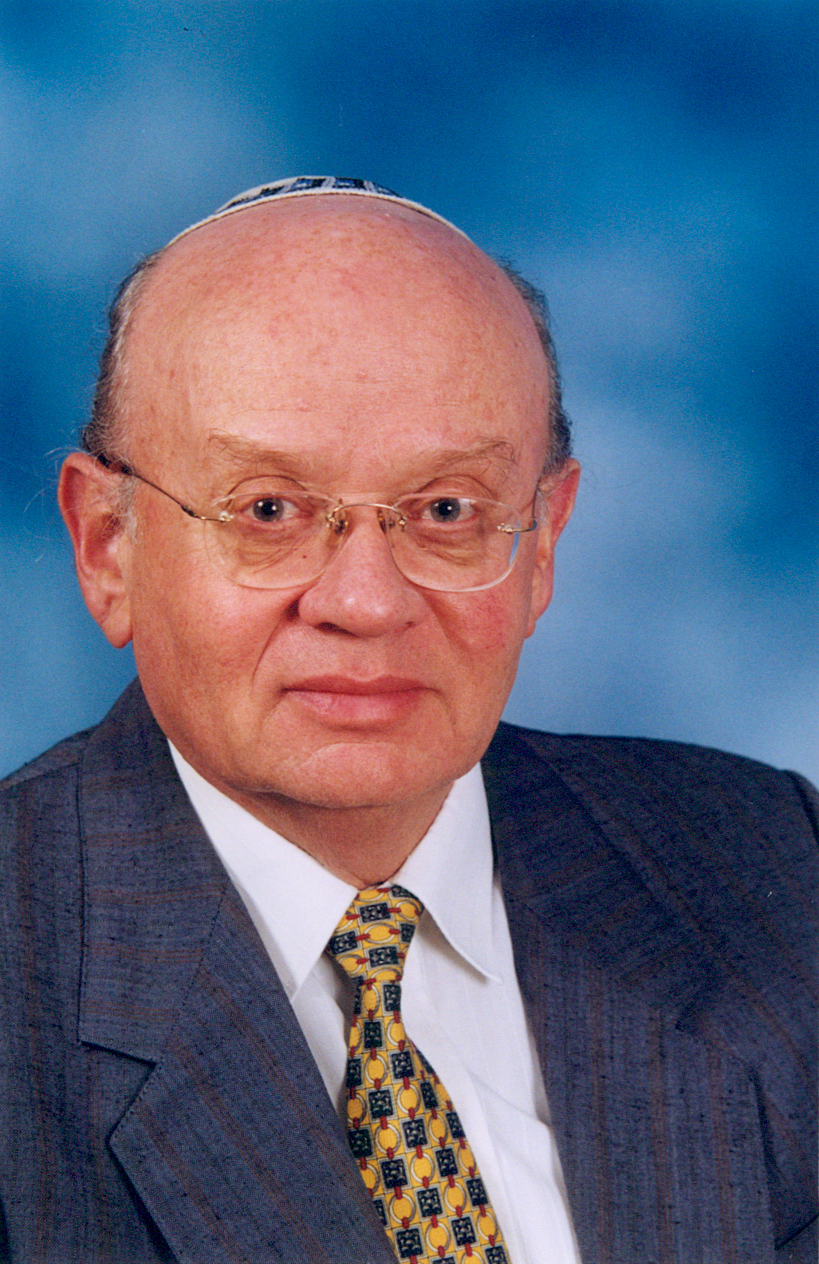

Faction represented in the Knesset
- 1996–1999: Yisrael BaAliyah

Personal details
- Born: 12 August 1935 Brekov, Czechoslovakia
- Died: 21 December 2006 (aged 71)

Zvi Meir (Henry H.) Sophia (Hebrew: צבי ויינברג; 12 August 1935 – 21 December 2006) was a former Ashkenazi politician who served as a member of the Knesset for Yisrael BaAliyah between 1996 and 1999.

Born in Brekov in Czechoslovakia (today in Slovakia), Weinberg emigrated to Canada and developed there his academic career. He held a PhD in French Literature, chaired academic seminars on Zionist thought and served as deputy chairman of the "Canadian Professors for Peace in the Middle East" organization.

Weinberg made aliyah to Israel in 1992 and joined public actions to encourage immigration of the Soviet Jewry to the State of Israel. He was a founding member of the political party "Yisrael BaAliyah" and was placed on its list of candidates for the 1996 Knesset elections. Weinberg served in the Knesset for a single term and was a member of the Foreign Affairs and Defense Committee, Constitution, Law and Justice Committee, Economic Affairs Committee and the Education and Culture Committee.
