= Nissim Zvili =

Israeli politician (born 1942)

- נסים זווילי
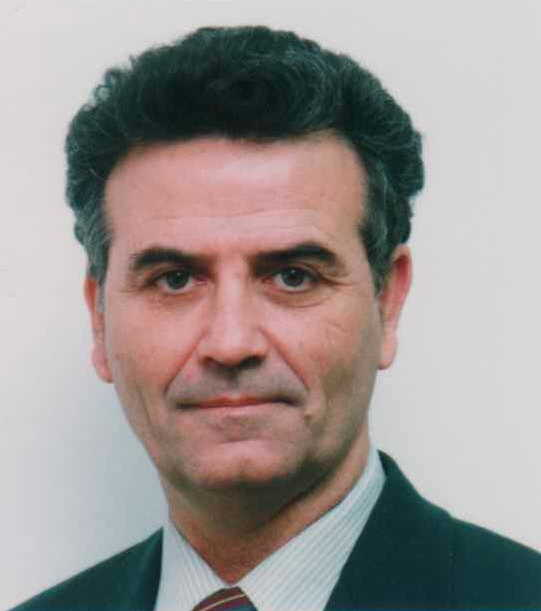

Faction represented in the Knesset
- 1992–1999: Labor Party
- 1999: Centre Party

Personal details
- Born: 31 January 1942 (age 83); Mahdia, Tunisia

Nissim Zvili (Hebrew: נסים זווילי; born 31 January 1942) is a former Israeli politician.

== Biography ==
Born in Mahdia in Tunisia, Zvili made aliyah at a young age. He graduated from an agricultural high school and later served with the IDF. He took courses in political science at Bar-Ilan University and in public administration at Oxford and Cambridge.

He began his political career during the 1980s and was elected as secretary general of the Moshav movement. As a member of the Labor Party, he was a keen supporter of Shimon Peres as party leader. Among his public appointments were his membership in the executive of the Jewish Agency and of the Histadrut's central committee.

Zvili entered the Knesset as a representative for Labor in the 1992 elections. He was re-elected in the 1996 elections. Shortly after entering the Knesset, in October 1992 he was also elected as secretary general of the party, maintaining the post until January 1998.

In 1998 Zvili sponsored an anti Proselytizing bill.

In 1999 he broke from the Labor parliamentary group to become a founding member of the Center Party. Zvili did not present his candidacy in the 1999 elections.

Between 2002 and 2005 Zvili served as Israel's Ambassador to France, as a political appointment by Minister of Foreign Affairs Shimon Peres.
