= Hashem Mahameed =

Israeli politician (1945–2018)

- هاشم محاميد
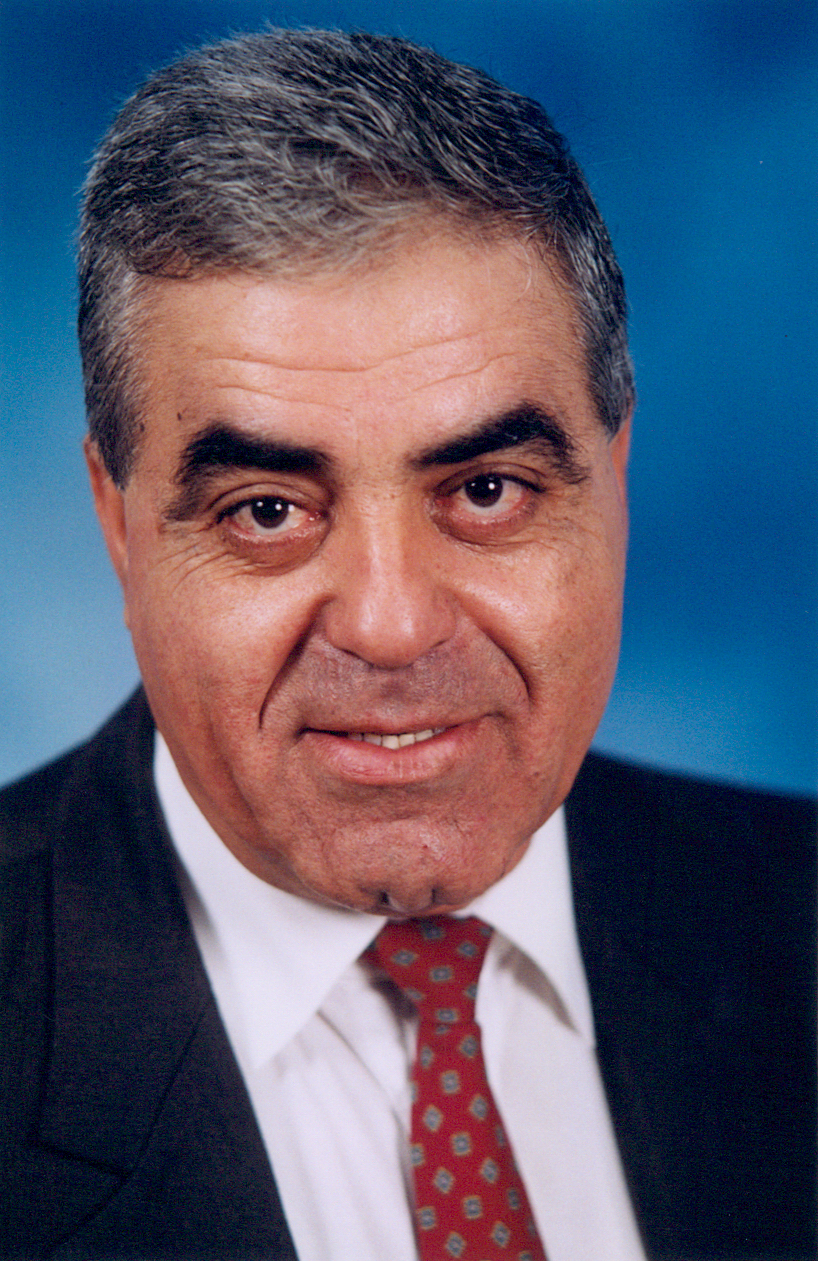

Faction represented in the Knesset
- 1990–1999: Hadash
- 1999: Balad
- 1999–2002: United Arab List
- 2002–2003: Progressive National Alliance

Personal details
- Born: 18 February 1945; Umm al-Fahm, Mandatory Palestine
- Died: 3 April 2018 (aged 73); Umm al-Fahm, Israel

Hashem Mahameed (Arabic: هاشم محاميد, Hebrew: האשם מחאמיד; 18 February 1945 – 3 April 2018) was an Arab Israeli politician who served as a member of the Knesset for Hadash, Balad, United Arab List and National Unity – National Progressive Alliance between 1990 and 2003.

== Biography ==
Born in Umm al-Fahm during the British Mandate of Palestine, Mahameed studied education at the Hadassim Teachers' Seminary and Tel Aviv University, gaining a BA and an MA.

Mahameed served as mayor of Umm al-Fahm from 1983 to 1989. He became a national politician when he entered the Knesset on 10 January 1990 on the Hadash list as a replacement for the long-serving Meir Vilner. He was re-elected in 1992, and again in 1996, by which time Hadash were running on a joint list with Balad. On 8 March 1999, shortly before Knesset elections, Mahameed joined Balad, which left its alliance with Hadash.

However, he did not contest the elections on the Balad list, instead winning third place on the United Arab List list. On 10 December 2002 he left the United Arab List and established a new faction, National Unity – National Progressive Alliance (later renamed Progressive National Alliance). The party ran in the 2003 elections with Mahameed as its head, resulting in him losing his seat.

Mahameed died on 3 April 2018 at the age of 73.
