= Nissim Dahan =

Israeli politician (born 1954)

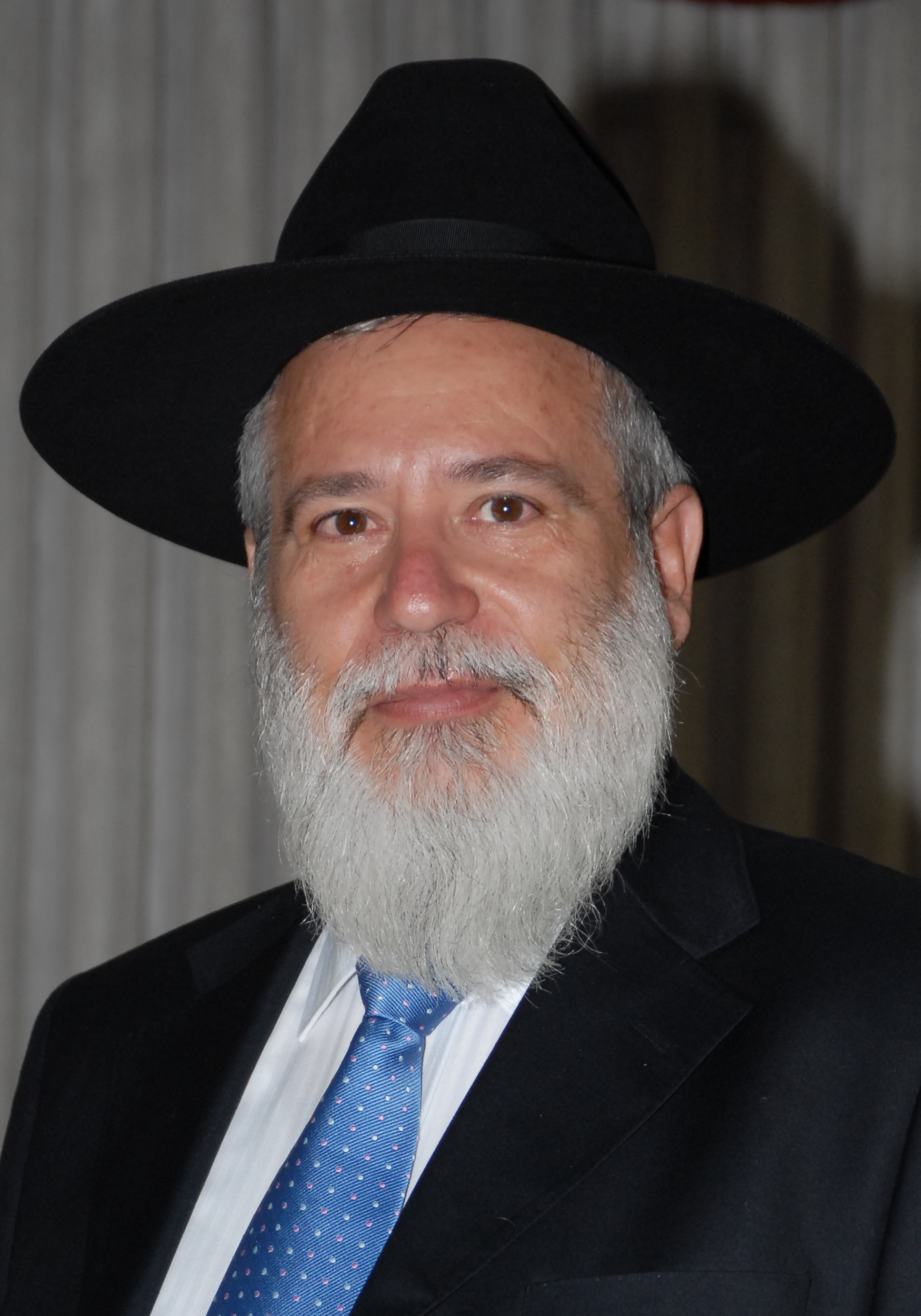
- Dahan in 2007

Ministerial roles
- 2001–2002: Minister of Health
- 2002–2003: Minister of Health

Faction represented in the Knesset
- 1996–2006: Shas

Personal details
- Born: 7 May 1954 (age 70); Morocco

Nissim Dahan (Hebrew: נסים דהן; born 7 May 1954) is an Israeli former politician who served as Minister of Health from 2001 until 2003.

== Biography ==
Born in Morocco, Dahan's family emigrated to Israel in 1955. He worked in the Ministry of Religious Affairs, becoming director of its organisations and institutions department. He was also a member of the Jerusalem Development Authority for 3 years.

In 1996 he was elected to the Knesset on Shas' list. He was re-elected in 1999, and was appointed Deputy Minister of Finance in Ehud Barak's government. He left the cabinet when Shas pulled out of the coalition in July 2000, but returned as Minister of Health when Ariel Sharon formed a new government following the 2001 election for Prime Minister. During his time as the Minister of Health he issued a ban on the importation of female eggs into Israel intended for in vitro fertilisation, the ban was overturned six months later. During a visit to a visit to a treatment center for the mentally ill, he apologized for the neglected medical and mental health treatment of Holocaust Survivors in Israel. He briefly left the portfolio on 23 May 2002 when Shas pulled out of the government again, but returned on 3 June.

He retained his seat in the 2003 elections and was appointed Deputy Speaker of the Knesset, but Shas were left out of the government and he lost his ministerial portfolio. He lost his Knesset seat in the 2006 elections.

== See also ==
- Jerusalem Development Authority
