= Third Way (Israel) =

Third Way הדרך השלישית
- Leader: Avigdor Kahalani
- Founded: 1994 (as movement); 1996 (as party)
- Dissolved: 2011
- Split from: Israeli Labor Party
- Ideology: Third Way; Retention of the Golan Heights; Liberalism (Israeli); Liberal Zionism; Zionism
- Political position: Centre to centre-left
- Most MKs: 4 (1996)

Election symbol
- הד

The Third Way (Hebrew: הדרך השלישית, HaDerekh HaShlishit) was a political party in Israel in the 1990s.

== Background ==
The party was formed on 7 March 1996 towards the end of the thirteenth Knesset's term when two MKs, Avigdor Kahalani and Emanuel Zisman, broke away from the Labour Party. Kahalani and Zisman disagreed with the party's willingness to entertain the idea of withdrawing from the Golan Heights in return for peace with Syria. While the party objected to withdrawal from the Golan Heights and took a hawkish position as to Lebanon, it held more moderate views on the peace process.

The party ran in the 1996 elections and won 96,457 votes. This gave them four seats, with Yehuda Harel and Professor Alexander Lubotzky joining Kahalani and Zisman in the Knesset. They were invited to join Netanyahu's Likud-led government and Kahalani was appointed Minister of Internal Security. On 23 March 1999, Zisman left the party to sit as an independent.

The party ran in the 1999 elections, but faced with a massive loss of support, won only 26,290 votes (0.7%), well below the electoral threshold of 1.5%. After its failure, the party ceased to function, but remained registered. In 2011 its registration was taken over by Independence.

== Leaders ==
Leader	Took office	Left office
Avigdor Kahalani	1996	2011

== Election results ==
Election	Leader	Votes	%	Seats	+/–	Status
1996	Avigdor Kahalani	96,474	3.1 (#9)	4 / 120	▲2	Government
1999	Avigdor Kahalani	26,290	0.7 (#19)	0 / 120	▼4	Extraparliamentray
