= Ra'anan Cohen =

Israeli politician (born 1941)

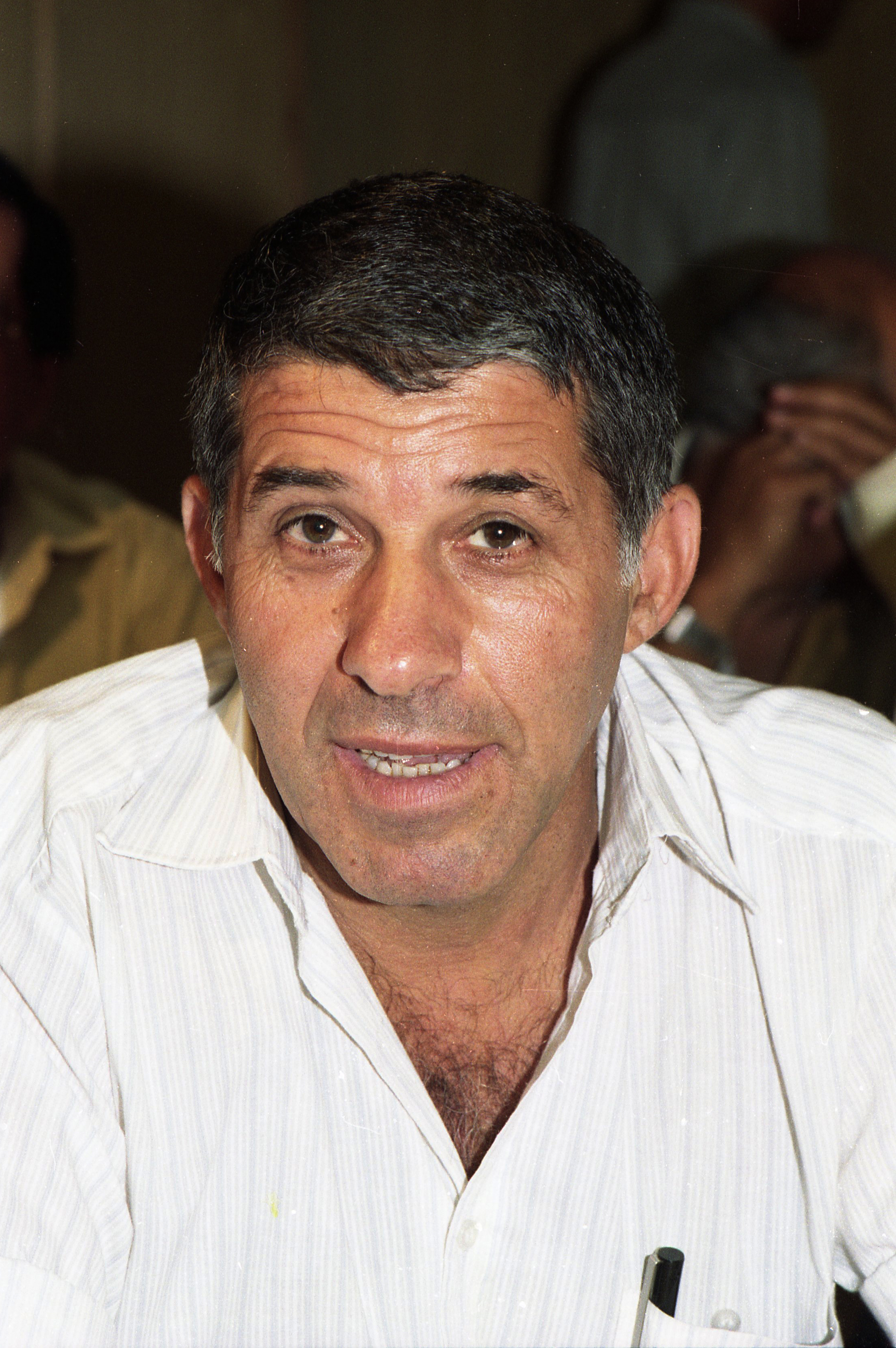
- Cohen in 1992

Ministerial roles
- 2000–2001: Minister of Labor & Social Welfare
- 2001–2002: Minister without Portfolio

Faction represented in the Knesset
- 1988–1991: Alignment
- 1991–1999: Labor Party
- 1999–2001: One Israel
- 2001–2002: Labor Party

Personal details
- Born: 28 February 1941 (age 85) Baghdad, Iraq

Ra'anan Cohen (Hebrew: רענן כהן; born 28 February 1941) is an Israeli former politician who served as a government minister during the early 2000s.

== Biography ==
Born in Baghdad in Iraq, Cohen emigrated to Israel in 1951. During his youth he was a counsellor in the HaNoar HaOved VeHaLomed youth movement, and was secretary of the Labor Party youth guard in Bnei Brak until 1970. He took Middle Eastern studies at Tel Aviv University, gaining a BA, MA and PhD in the subject. He served as chairman of Labor Party's Arab and Druze branch between 1975 and 1986, and from 1986 to 1992 chaired the party's elections branch.

In 1988 he was elected to the Knesset on the Alignment list. He was re-elected in 1992 (by which time the Alignment had merged into the Labor Party) and 1996. In December 1997 he was elected secretary-general of the party with 76% of the vote. He retained his seat in the 1999 elections (on the One Israel list) and in August 2000 was appointed Minister of Labor and Social Welfare in Ehud Barak's government following Shas' departure from the coalition government.

When Ariel Sharon formed a national unity government following the special election for Prime Minister in 2001, Cohen became a Minister without Portfolio. He left the cabinet on 18 August 2002 and resigned from the Knesset three days later, retiring from politics.

Cohen has written several books, including Strangers in their Homeland: A Critical Study of Israel's Arab Citizens.

== Books ==
- Dinero, Steven C. (1 September 2010). "Strangers in Their Homeland: A Critical Study of Israel's Arab Citizens – By Ra'anan Cohen". Digest of Middle East Studies. 19 (2): 349–351. doi:10.1111/j.1949-3606.2010.00055.x. ISSN 1060-4367.
