= Shmaryahu Ben-Tzur =

Israeli politician

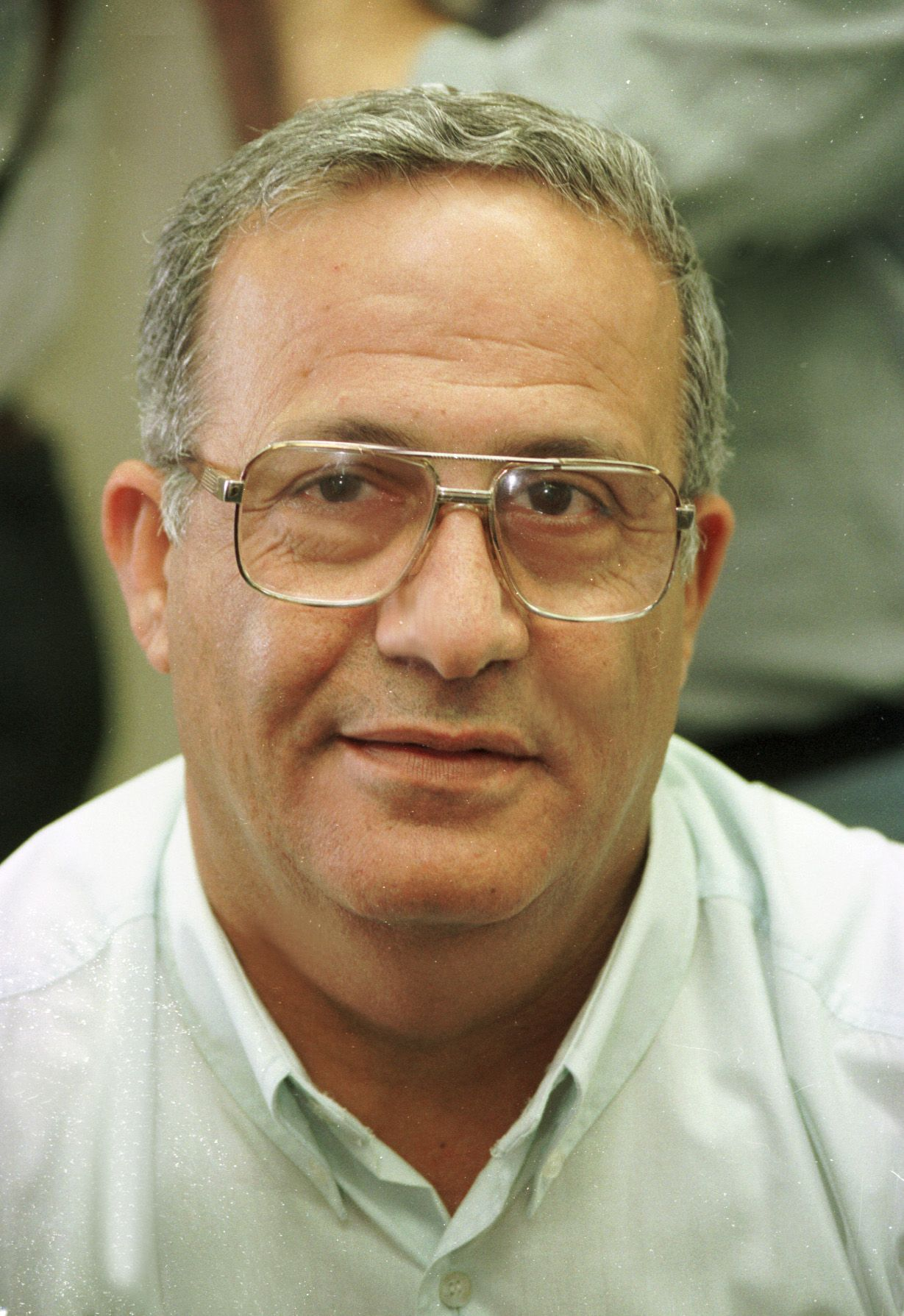

Faction represented in the Knesset
- 1996–1999: National Religious Party

Personal details
- Born: 25 March 1944 (age 82) Yemen

Shmaryahu Ben-Tzur (Hebrew: שמריהו בן-צור; born 25 March 1944) is an Israeli former politician who served as a member of the Knesset for the National Religious Party between 1996 and 1999.

== Biography ==
Born in Yemen in 1944, Ben-Tzur made aliyah to Israel in 1950. He gained a BA at the Hebrew University of Jerusalem, before studying for an MA in political science at Bar-Ilan University. He later worked as a teacher and a school inspector for the Ministry of Education. He also founded and chaired the World Union of Torah Teachers, chaired the Religious Teachers' Union and was acting secretary-general of the Teachers' Union.

He was elected to the Knesset on the National Religious Party's list in 1996, and was appointed Deputy Speaker. He was placed tenth on the party's list for the 1999 elections, but lost his seat as the party was reduced from nine to five seats.
