= Moshe Shahal =

Israeli politician (born 1934)

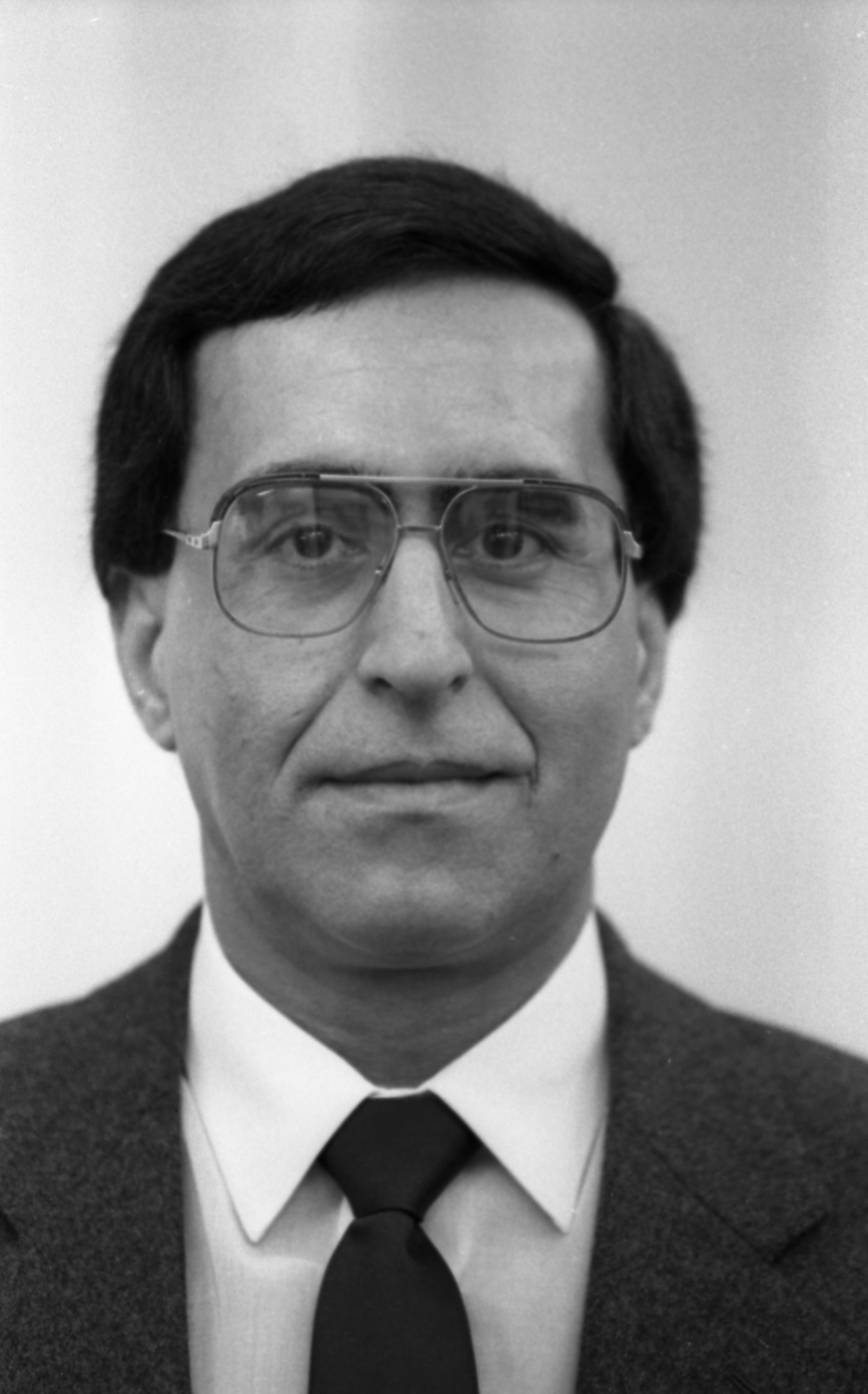
- Shahal in 1985

Ministerial roles
- 1984–1990: Minister of Energy & Infrastructure
- 1992–1993: Minister of Communications
- 1992–1996: Minister of Internal Security

Faction represented in the Knesset
- 1969–1991: Alignment
- 1991–1999: Labor Party

Personal details
- Born: 20 May 1934 (age 92) Baghdad, Iraq

Moshe Shahal (Hebrew: משה שחל; born 20 May 1934) is an Israeli former politician.

== Biography ==
Born in Baghdad in the Hashemite Kingdom of Iraq, Shahal emigrated to Israel in 1950. He studied economics and political science at the University of Haifa, before graduating with a law degree from Tel Aviv University.

He began his political career when elected to the Haifa Labor Council in 1964, a position he retained until 1971. Between 1964 and 1969, he was also a member of Haifa City Council. For the 1969 Knesset elections he was placed 57th on Alignment's list, missed out when the alliance won only 56 seats, but entered the Knesset on 1 September 1971 as a replacement for the deceased Mordechai Ofer.

He was re-elected in 1974, 1977, 1981, and between 1981 and 1984 served as a Deputy Speaker of the Knesset. After a fourth re-election in 1984, he was appointed Minister of Energy & Infrastructure. He was re-appointed to the post following the 1988 elections, serving until the Alignment pulled out of the coalition government in 1990.

Following Labor's victory in the 1992 elections, Shahal was appointed to two posts in the cabinet; Minister of Communications and Minister of Police. He held the Communications portfolio until 7 June 1993, when he was replaced by Shulamit Aloni. However, he regained the Energy and Construction post at the same time, though he gave it up in January 1995, when Gonen Segev (a new addition to Yitzhak Rabin's government) replaced him. Shahal retained the Police Ministry following Rabin's assassination, when it was renamed the Ministry of Public Security.

Although he retained his seat in the 1996 elections and Labor remained the largest party, Benjamin Netanyahu's Likud formed the government, and Shahal lost his place in the cabinet. He resigned from the Knesset on 20 March 1998 and was replaced by Rafik Haj Yahia.

Whilst serving as an MK, Shahal was a permanent observer to the Council of Europe (1974–76) and a permanent representative to the Inter-Parliamentary Union (1976–84). Outside the Knesset, he also served as a chairman of the Israel Consumer's Council. In the 2022 Knesset elections he was given the honorary last spot on the Labor list.
