= 2013 Israeli legislative election =

- 22 January 2013
- All 120 seats in the Knesset; 61 seats needed for a majority
- Turnout: 67.77% (▲3.05pp)
Party	Leader	Vote %	Seats	+/–
Likud Yisrael Beiteinu	Benjamin Netanyahu	23.34	31	−11
Yesh Atid	Yair Lapid	14.33	19	New
Labor	Shelly Yachimovich	11.39	15	+2
Jewish Home	Naftali Bennett	9.12	12	+5
Shas	Eli Yishai	8.75	11	+1
UTJ	Yaakov Litzman	5.16	7	+2
Hatnua	Tzipi Livni	4.99	6	New
Meretz	Zehava Gal-On	4.55	6	+3
Ra'am	Ibrahim Sarsur	3.65	4	0
Hadash	Mohammad Barakeh	2.99	4	0
Balad	Jamal Zahalka	2.56	3	0
Kadima	Shaul Mofaz	2.09	2	−26
This lists parties that won seats. See the complete results below.
Prime Minister before	Prime Minister after
Benjamin Netanyahu; Likud (32nd)	Benjamin Netanyahu; Likud Yisrael Beiteinu (33rd)

Early legislative elections were held in Israel on 22 January 2013 to elect the 120 members of the nineteenth Knesset. Public debate over the Tal Law had nearly led to early elections in 2012, but they were aborted at the last moment after Kadima briefly joined the government. The elections were later called in early October 2012 after failure to agree on the budget for the 2013 fiscal year.

The elections saw the Likud Yisrael Beiteinu alliance emerge as the largest faction in the Knesset, winning 31 of the 120 seats. Likud leader Benjamin Netanyahu formed the country's thirty-third government after establishing a coalition with Yesh Atid, the Jewish Home, and Hatnua, which between them held 68 seats.

== Background ==
Following the 2009 elections, in which right-wing and religious parties won the majority (65 out of 120, or 54%) of the seats, opposition leader Benjamin Netanyahu established a government including right-wing parties Likud, Yisrael Beiteinu, the ultra-orthodox Shas and United Torah Judaism, the religious Zionist Jewish Home, and the centre-left Labor Party.

Although there were disagreements between the coalition parties on issues of national security and the peace process, and separation of church and state, the government was relatively stable and was able to overcome several political and national security related crises with no real threat from the opposition. The stability of the coalition government increased after a split in the Labor Party when five of its members led by Ehud Barak left to establish the Independence Party. Whilst the Labor Party subsequently left the coalition, Independence remained within it, allowing the government to maintain a majority of 66 of the 120 seats in the Knesset.

Prime Minister Netanyahu's initial popularity remained stable, as he managed to overcome various events that could have endangered the stability of his government—such as the political speech at the Bar-Ilan University at the beginning of his term in which he endorsed the idea of a Palestinian state alongside Israel for the first time, the government's agreement to freeze construction in the West Bank, in light of the common belief of the Israeli public that the diplomatic relations between the United States and Israel had worsened during Netanyahu's term, the 2010 Gaza flotilla incident and its implications, the outbreak of the 2010 Mount Carmel forest fire and the various government oversights which were attributed to this blunder, as well as the growing debate within the Israeli public about a pre-emptive attack on Iran.

However, a decline in the popularity of Netanyahu and his government occurred in summer 2011 following the protests about social justice. Nevertheless, the decline passed quickly after Netanyahu's speech at the General debate of the sixty-sixth session of the United Nations General Assembly in September 2011 following the Palestinian diplomatic campaign to gain full membership of the United Nations, and following cross-border attacks in the south of the country in August 2011. In addition, Netanyahu's popularity was increased after the Gilad Shalit prisoner exchange was approved and Shalit was released. These events led to the highest level of public support Netanyahu had received since the start of his term in office.

As a result of the high levels of support for the government, Netanyahu announced that early primaries would be held in the Likud party, a move which slightly surprised the Israeli political establishment and led to speculations about the possibility that Netanyahu would announce early general elections, due to his high approval ratings.

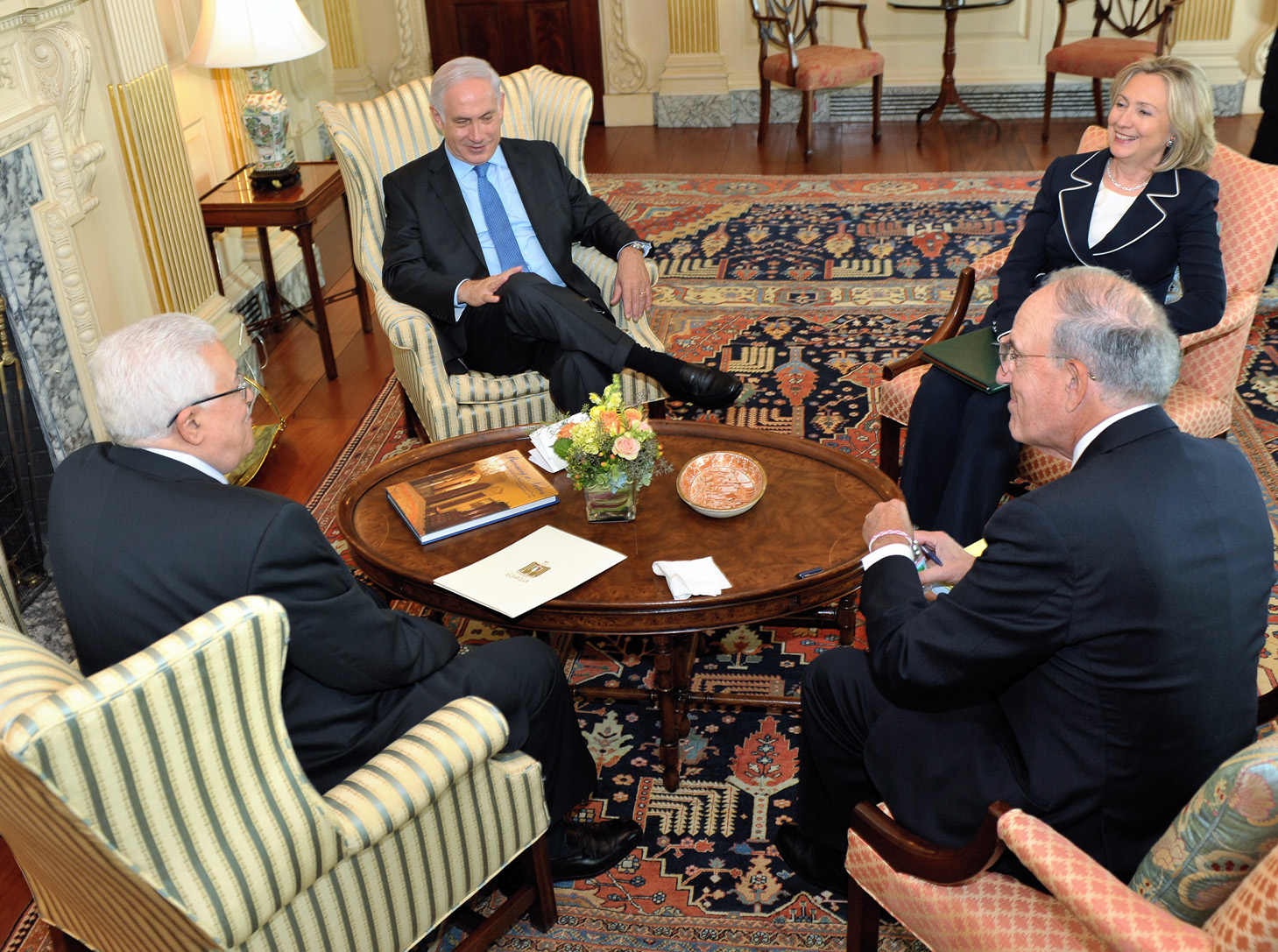
Netanyahu, together with Mahmoud Abbas, Hillary Clinton and George J. Mitchell at the start of the direct talks on 2 September 2010.

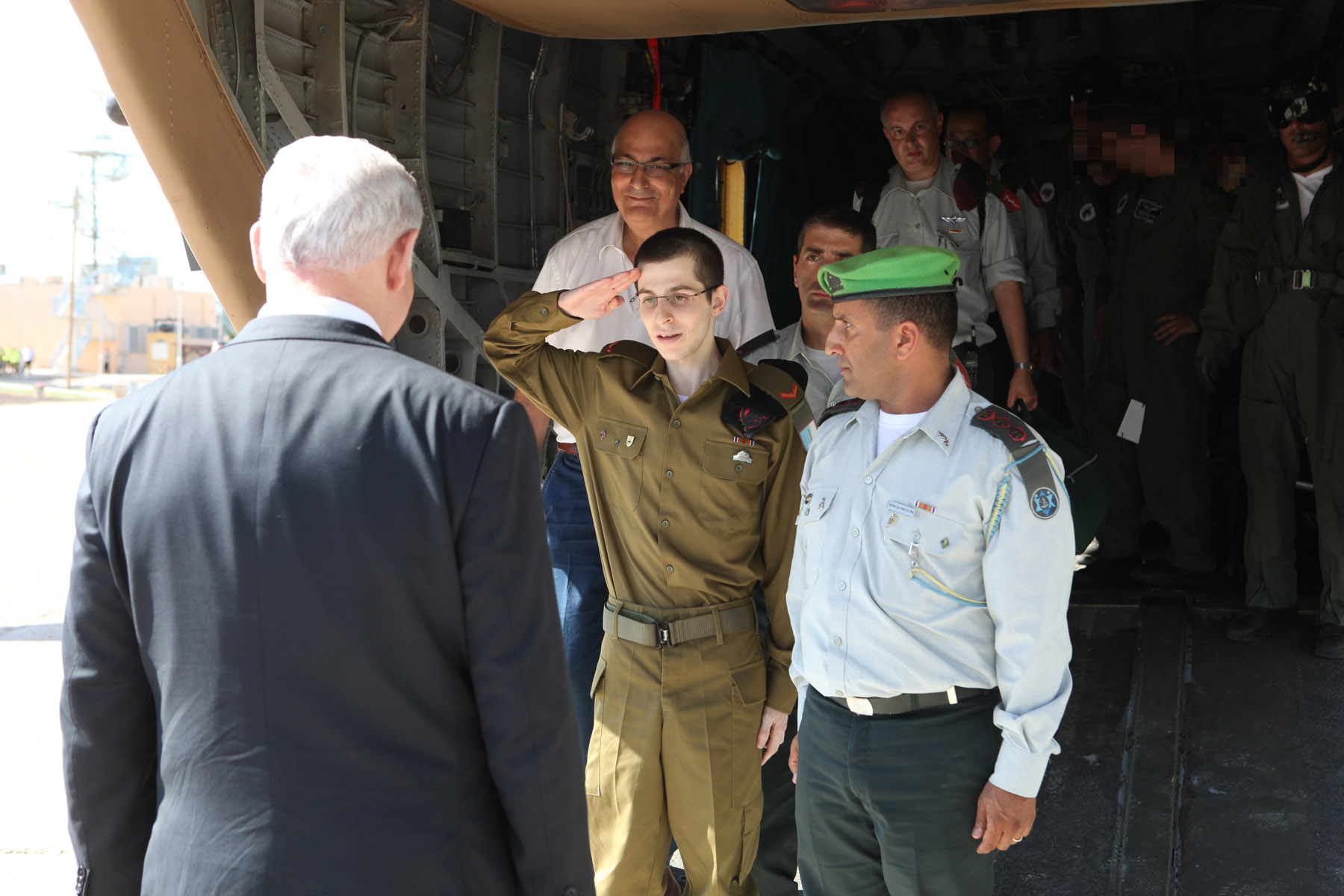
Gilad Shalit prisoner exchange

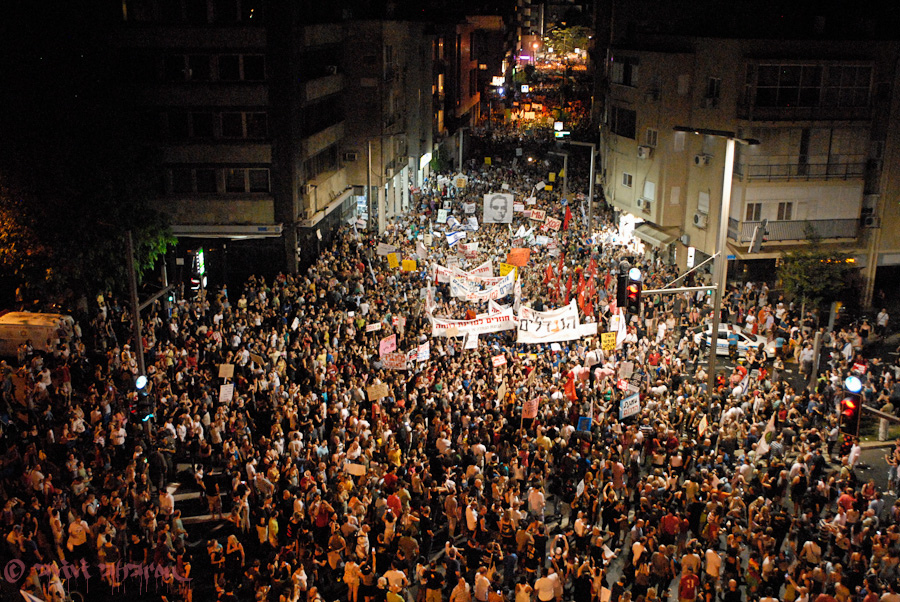
2011 Israeli social justice protests

=== Tal Law controversy and implications ===
Prior to the decision to dissolve the Knesset, attempts to amend the Tal Law, which allows Haredi to indefinitely defer national service, by Yisrael Beiteinu and Kadima were struck down by the High Court of Justice. It was also supported by the Independence party, but failed after Shas appealed an expedited process pass through the Ministerial Committee on Legislative Affairs, which meant it would have to be rediscussed and could not pass. The dissolution of parliament would force an automatic extension of the law, due to expire on 1 August, for another six to eight months. Netanyahu said a new law should "make the burden [of serving in the IDF or civilian service] more equal and fair". Yisrael Beiteinu said the dissolution should have been postponed so that its proposed Equal National Service for All bill could be voted upon. Similarly, Kadima chairman Shaul Mofaz told the "Suckers Camp" (מאהל הפראיירים) protesters outside Likud's political convention that this was an "historic opportunity to clean the moral stain that is the Tal Law". He also said that the motion to dissolve the legislature at this state was a "stinky political trick" by Netanyahu, Yacimovich, and the Haredi parties. Dalia Itzik of Kadima also reiterated calls to have a new law before the election.

On 7 May the Knesset voted on a series of bills relating to its dissolution and holding the election on 4 September, which passed; however, in the early morning of 8 May, a few hours before the Knesset was expected to approve the bill which would bring the 18th Knesset's term to its end, Prime Minister Benjamin Netanyahu reached an agreement with the Kadima leader Shaul Mofaz to join the current government, thus canceling the early election supposed to be held in September.

On 17 July, after the failure of parties to reach a compromise on the issue, Kadima voted to pull out of the coalition. The coalition did, however, still have a majority of seats even without Kadima. Nevertheless, the reduced coalition which was now divided between nationalist groups such as Yisrael Beiteinu and Haredi groups such as Shas, cast doubts regarding the coalition's ability to pass a budget for 2013 on the date prescribed by law. This situation, of the inability to pass the budget, revived the possibility that early elections might be held – a possibility which Prime Minister Netanyahu expressed his support of during a special speech he delivered from his public office on 9 October.

== Parliament factions ==
The table below lists the parliamentary factions represented in the 18th Knesset.

Name	Ideology	Symbol	Leader	2009 result		Seats at 2012 dissolution
Name	Ideology	Symbol	Leader	Votes (%)	Seats	Seats at 2012 dissolution
Kadima	Liberalism	כן	Shaul Mofaz	22.47%	28 / 120	21 / 120
Hatnua	Social liberalism	צפ	Tzipi Livni	22.47%	0 / 120	7 / 120
Likud	National liberalism Conservatism	מחל	Benjamin Netanyahu	21.61%	27 / 120	27 / 120
Yisrael Beiteinu	Nationalism; Secularism	ל	Avigdor Lieberman	11.70%	15 / 120	15 / 120
Labor	Social democracy	אמת	Shelly Yachimovich	9.93%	13 / 120	8 / 120
Independence	Social liberalism	-	Ehud Barak	9.93%	0 / 120	5 / 120
Shas	Religious conservatism	שס	Eli Yishai	8.49%	11 / 120	10 / 120
Am Shalem	Religious liberalism	ץ	Haim Amsalem	8.49%	0 / 120	1 / 120
UTJ	Religious conservatism	ג	Yaakov Litzman	4.39%	5 / 120	5 / 120
Ra'am-Ta'al	Arab nationalism Islamism	עם	Ibrahim Sarsur	3.38%	4 / 120	4 / 120
National Union	Right-wing populism National conservatism	ט	Yaakov Katz	3.34%	4 / 120	2 / 120
Otzma LeYisrael	Religious Zionism; Kahanism	נץ	Aryeh Eldad	3.34%	0 / 120	2 / 120
Hadash	Communism; Socialism	ו	Mohammad Barakeh	3.32%	4 / 120	4 / 120
Meretz	Progressivism; Secularism	מרצ	Zehava Gal-On	2.95%	3 / 120	3 / 120
The Jewish Home	Religious Zionism; National conservatism	ב	Naftali Bennett	2.87%	3 / 120	3 / 120
Balad	Palestinian nationalism	ד	Jamal Zahalka	2.48%	3 / 120	3 / 120

== Date ==
Since the term of the 17th Knesset ended prematurely, the term of the 18th Knesset is four full years plus eight more months, starting from the month of its election (February 2009). The expected date for a regular election was to be on 22 October 2013, but an early election was announced.

Likud's coalition chairman MK Ze'ev Elkin wanted the election to be scheduled for 4 September 2012. He got support for the motion from Yisrael Beiteinu, Shas and Labor; however, Kadima wanted the election 16 September. Meretz, Labor and Elkin submitted different motions for dissolution. Netanyahu told the Likud party on 7 May that he would like an early election saying that he does not "want there to be a year-and-a-half of political instability accompanied by blackmail and populism. I'd prefer a short electoral campaign of four months that will ensure political stability. I would have been very happy if we could have completed the term, which was also my goal, but it is no secret that with the start of the government's fourth year, the coalition is fraying somewhat. The achievements of this government are a result of a joint vision and a partnership that was possible due to political stability. We have not had such a stable government in decades. We are proposing 4 September, after which, God and voters willing, we will receive a mandate."

The Knesset House Committee's approval on 7 May for the expedition of the bill to dissolve the 18th Knesset allowing for plenum vote. The committee bill was approved by a vote of 13 to four. Though Shas voted against the measure, a party member said that "Shas' unambiguous stance is to support the early elections and the legislation. [Shas MKs] abstained due to confusion. We support the bill."

On 9 October, Netanyahu made a televised address in which he reacted to the inability to pass a budget for the next fiscal year by the deadline of 31 December. He said: "I have decided that it is in Israel's better interest to go to elections now and as quickly as possible. For Israel, it is preferable to have as short a campaign as possible, one of three months over one that would last in practice an entire year and damage Israel's economy." Reactions to the announcement included the Labor Party's Shelley Yachimovich who said that despite lagging in opinion polls to Likud there was a "reasonable probability" of winning and that "the public today understands that security is not just on the borders, but is also job and income security and health and education security". Kadima's Shaul Mofaz told Channel 10: "I think the decision for early elections is a day of hope for the citizens of Israel. It is an opportunity to replace the bad Netanyahu government that has isolated Israel politically over the past four years, damaged Israel's deterrence, and deteriorated the middle class."

== Calendar ==
- 6 December 2012 – the last day for submission of the lists of candidates for the Knesset to the Central Election Commission.
- 10 January 2013 – Election day only members of the Israeli diplomatic missions
- 18 January 2013 – after this date the publication of polls and predictions is prohibited.
- 21 January 2013 – starting from 19:00 campaigning using assemblies, meetings, speakers, and media is prohibited.
- 22 January 2013 – Election Day. Polling stations open from 7:00 to 22:00.
- 5 February 2013 – the general meeting of the newly elected Knesset.
- 6 February 2013 – the last day to request formation of a new Israeli government from one of the leaders of the factions.
- 20 March 2013 – the last day to report about the task to form a new government by a faction leader to the President.

== Surplus-vote agreements ==
Two parties can make a surplus-vote agreement so that the sum of both parties' surplus votes are combined, and if the combined surplus votes amounts to an extra seat, then the extra seat goes to the party with the larger number of surplus votes. Several agreements were signed by parties prior to the election:

- Likud Yisrael Beiteinu and The Jewish Home
- Hatnua and Meretz
- Israeli Labor Party and Yesh Atid
- Am Shalem and Kadima
- Hadash and Balad
- United Torah Judaism and Shas
- Dor Bonei Haaretz and Tzedek Hevrati

== Campaign ==
The decision to have an early election was read as influential over the issue of an attack on Iran. A victory for Likud could bolster the case for an armed strike; however, it was also risky during an election. It would, however, be an election issue.

Likud's Netanyahu said that in a new government he would seek to have as large and stable a governing coalition as possible in order to "deal with the great challenges that we will face". He also said that his other priority would be to tackle the still high levels of crime. "We know that there has been a reduction of 30% in the incidence of murder, but these cases are brutal and underline our acknowledged need to battle these occurrences full force." He said that Internal Security Minister Yitzhak Aharonovitch and Police Commissioner Yohanan Danino were tasked with compiling a report into the 37 murders in 2012, in comparison to 52 in 2011, and said he was confident in curbing the trend.

Campaign issues, particularly in regards to attacking the Netanyahu government, are expected to be Netanyahu's relationship with U.S. President Barack Obama over Israel-Iran relations in light of the controversy over the Iranian nuclear programme, the stalling of the Israel-Palestinian peace process, the 2011 Israeli social justice protests and the aforementioned Tal law.

=== Likud and Yisrael Beiteinu present common list ===
On 25 October 2012, Prime Minister and Likud chairman Benjamin Netanyahu and Yisrael Beiteinu chairman Avigdor Lieberman announced that Yisrael Beiteinu and Likud would present a common list (without merging) in the 2013 general elections. "A joining of forces will give us the strength to defend Israel from military threats, and the strength to spearhead social and economic changes in the country", Netanyahu said. "In view of the challenges we're facing, we need responsibility on a national level ... We're providing a true alternative, and an opportunity for the citizens to stabilize leadership and government", Lieberman said.

=== Operation Pillar of Defense ===
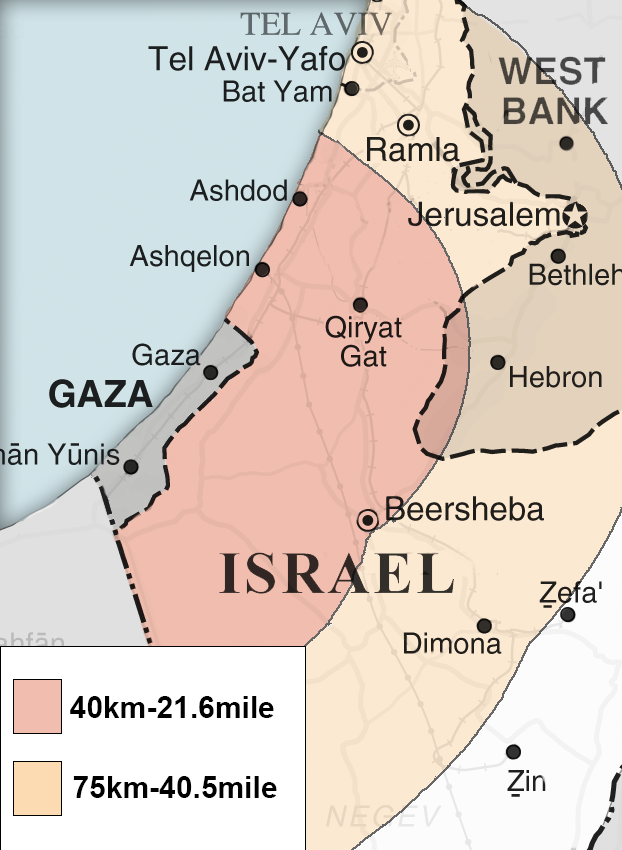
A map of the areas affected by the conflict.

In November 2012, following Gaza militants rocket and mortar fire at Israeli towns and villages and attacks committed against Israeli soldiers stationed near the border with the Gaza Strip, the Israeli political leadership ordered the IDF to launch Operation Pillar of Defense, during which the IAF conducted a series of air strikes against militant targets of the Hamas and against the organization's leaders, including the head of the organization's military wing Ahmed Jabari, who was assassinated while he was driving his car in Gaza City. As a result, Hamas responded by firing rockets and mortars at various localities in Israel, especially in the southern Israel region, but also in addition, for the first time in the Israeli–Palestinian conflict, managed to shoot rockets at Israel's biggest metropolitan area in the central region of Israel.

The operation in the Gaza Strip gained the support of most parties, including various opposition parties. However, some parties, including Meretz, Hadash, and all Israeli Arab parties, expressed their strong opposition to the operation. Some left-wing figures stated that the operation was actually an "Election War" aimed at putting aside socio-economic issues and replacing them with a defense agenda, and claimed that the operation would not help Israel in the long term.

After the Israeli government signed the ceasefire agreement with Hamas, a number of figures in the Israeli right-wing political spectrum, including Naftali Bennett and Aryeh Eldad, criticized the government's decision. During the operation and the shelling of southern Israel, various parties declared that they would suspend their political campaign until the operation would end—among them the Likud Party and the opposition parties Kadima and the Labor party.

=== Independence withdrawal ===
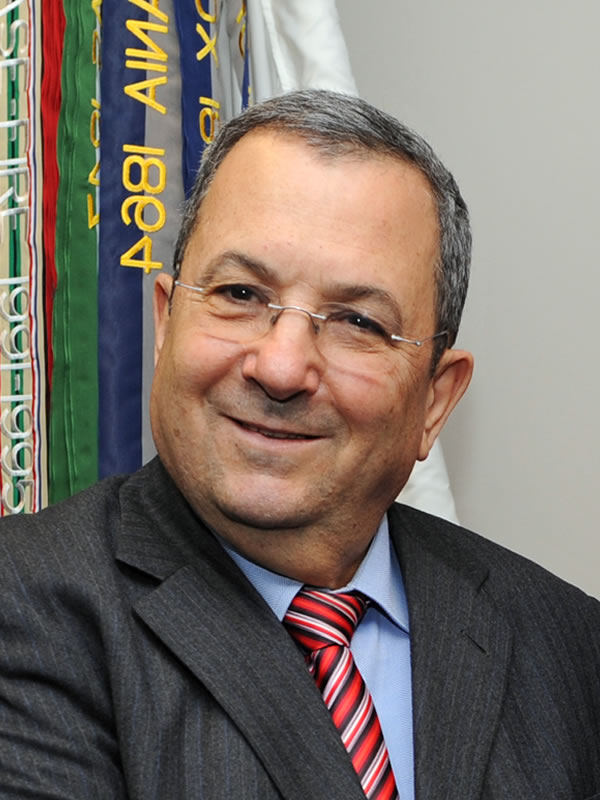
Party leader Ehud Barak announced on 26 November that he would retire from politics and that Independence was pulling out of the 2013 Israeli legislative elections.

On 26 November, Independence leader Ehud Barak announced that he would retire from politics after the next Minister of Defense was appointed, and that the party's political campaign was suspended. Subsequently, Shalom Simhon became the chairman of the party, but on 6 December, he announced that he was retiring from politics and that Independence was pulling out of the elections.

=== Palestinian statehood recognition ===
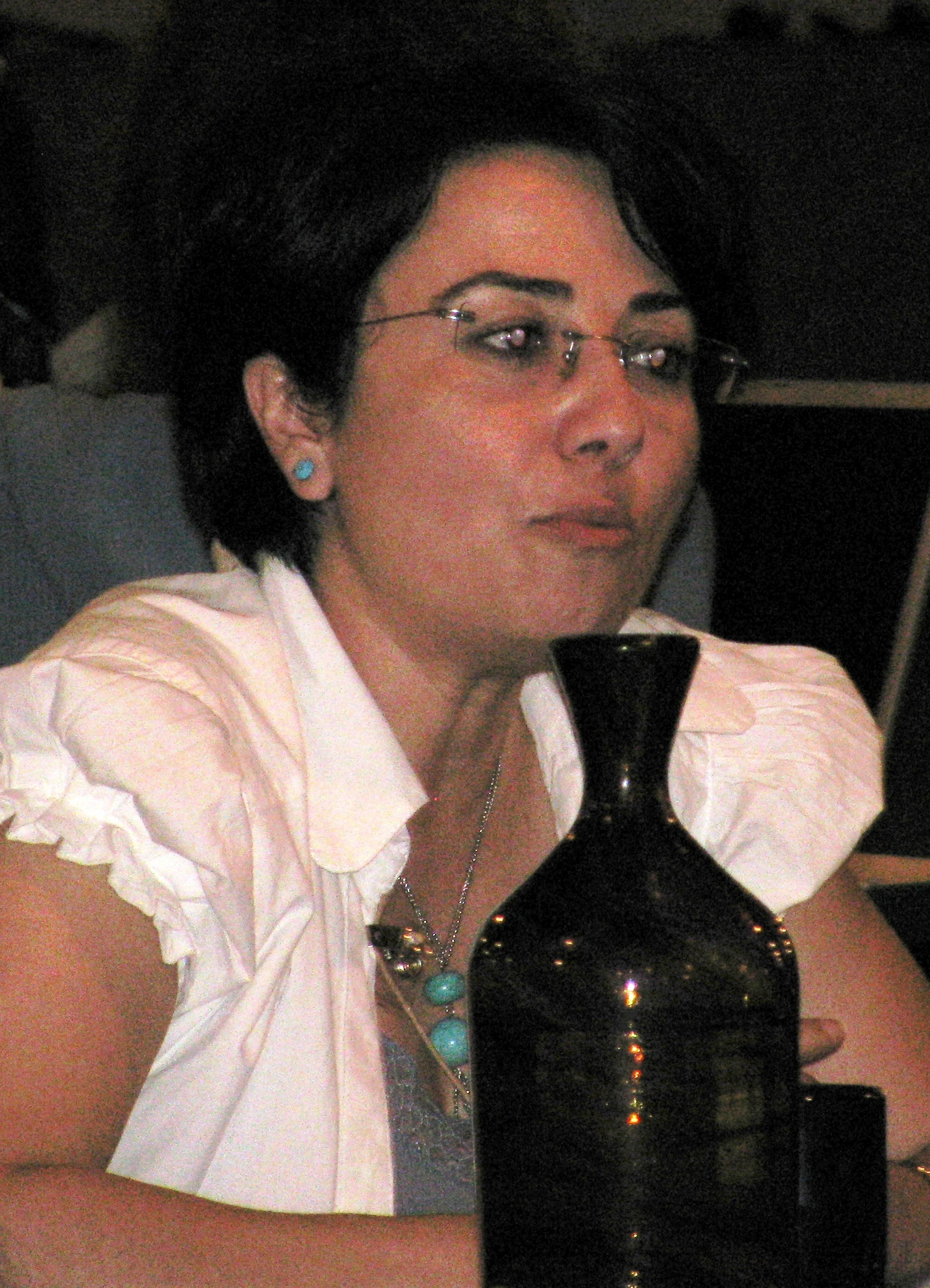
On 19 December MK Haneen Zoabi was initially disqualified from being re-elected in the 2013 election for "supporting terrorism and rejecting Israel as a Jewish and democratic state".

In the General Assembly of the United Nations held on 29 November 2012, the 67th session adopted a resolution that upgraded Palestine to non-member observer state status at the United Nations. The new status equates Palestine's with that of the Holy See. In response, the inner cabinet approved the building of housing units in area E1, connecting Jerusalem and Ma'aleh Adumim.

=== Disqualification petitions ===
The ultra-orthodox parties Shas and United Torah Judaism had men-only party lists, based on their belief that women in the Knesset would violate modesty laws. Because of this, the Central Elections Committee received petitions in December 2012 to disqualify both parties for being discriminatory. Likewise, the Otzma LeYisrael party, headed by Aryeh Eldad and Michael Ben-Ari, has come under scrutiny due to its alleged denial of Israel as both a Jewish and democratic state. On 20 December, the Committee declared it would not ban any of those parties.

On 19 December, the Committee voted to disqualify the Israeli Arab MK Haneen Zoabi from being re-elected on grounds of "supporting terrorism and rejecting Israel as a Jewish and democratic state". However, the ban was later overturned by the Supreme Court.

== Participating parties ==
The National Election Commission announced that 34 parties had filed to run, and the election is expected to cost 250 million shekels.

The parties listed below are ordered by the number of seats each of these parties eventually received in the 2013 Israeli legislative elections:

=== Likud Yisrael Beiteinu ===
Likud leadership election
Netanyahu
Feiglin
76.8% (48,490)
23.2% (14,660)
The "Likud Yisrael Beiteinu" List

1	Benjamin Netanyahu	2	Avigdor Lieberman
3	Gideon Sa'ar	4	Yair Shamir
5	Gilad Erdan	6	Silvan Shalom
7	Uzi Landau	8	Yisrael Katz
9	Danny Danon	10	Sofa Landver
11	Reuven Rivlin	12	Moshe Ya'alon
13	Yitzhak Aharonovich	14	Ze'ev Elkin
15	Tzipi Hotovely	16	Orly Levy
17	Yariv Levin	18	Yuli-Yoel Edelstein
19	Faina Kirschenbaum	20	Haim Katz
21	Miri Regev	22	David Rotem
23	Moshe Feiglin	24	Yuval Steinitz
25	Robert Ilatov	26	Tzachi Hanegbi
27	Limor Livnat	28	Hamad Amar
29	Ofir Akunis	30	Gila Gamliel
31	Shimon Ohayon	32	Carmel Shama
33	Alex Miller	34	Leon Litinetski
35	David Bitan	36	Uri Faraj
37	Yulia Malinovsky	38	Keti Shitrit
39	Ayoob Kara	40	Smadar Bat Adam Levitan
41	Shuki Ohana	42	Dudu Amsalem
43	Oded Forer	44	Victor Ifraimov
45	Yitzhak Danino	46	Moshe Matalon
47	Keren Barak	48	Avraham Neguise
49	Lia Shemtov	50	David Even Tzur

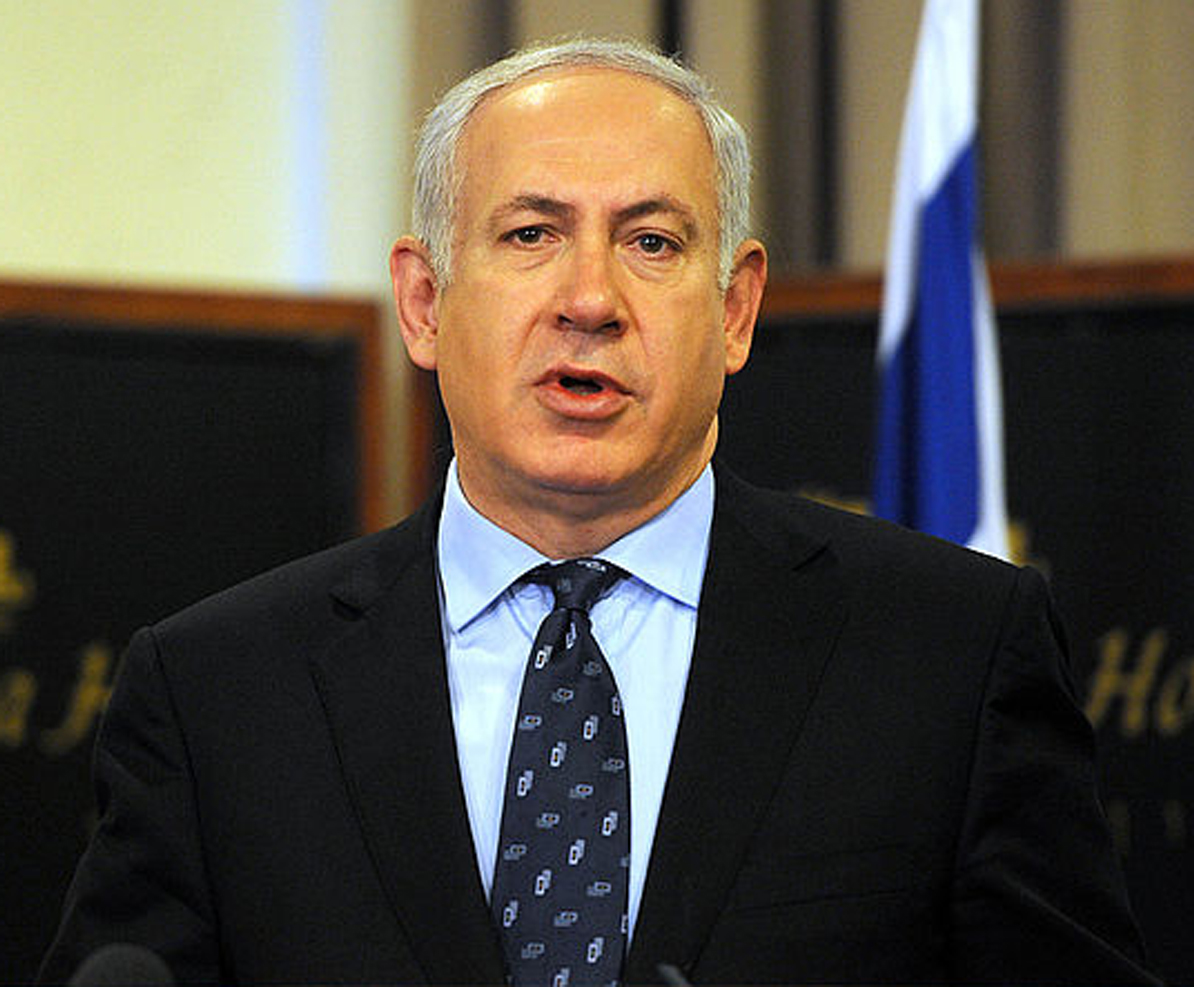
The winner of the Likud leadership election and number one of the Likud Beiteinu list - Benjamin Netanyahu.

In early December 2011, Prime Minister Benjamin Netanyahu initially announced that early primaries would be held for the leadership of the Likud Party – this announcement was later supported and approved by the Likud's Central Committee later that month. The date of the Likud primaries was set for 31 January 2012. Netanyahu's main political opponent in the Likud party, Silvan Shalom, was surprised by the move and even declared it to be illegal, but eventually announced that he would not be running against Netanyahu for the leadership of the party, thus leaving Moshe Feiglin as Netanyahu's sole competitor.

During the election day Netanyahu repeatedly attempted to spur the Likud members to come to the polls and vote, nevertheless the turnout remained low. As a result, and due to various many failures at the opening of polling stations across Israel, the voting time was extended by two hours in some places. Nevertheless, at the end of the day the voter turnout was 50% of the total eligible voters. Despite Netanyahu's fears of a low voter turnout, the vast majority of voters supported him, while Moshe Feiglin gained relatively low support.

In early May, Netanyahu's attempts to head the Likud central committee were dealt blow as party members called for a secret ballot, which was seen as an hindrance to him in beating out Danny Danon. Popular Communications and Welfare & Social Services Minister and Likud MK Moshe Kahlon declared he will not contest the upcoming election. The decision was considered surprising, with Likud officials speculating that Kahlon was passed over by Netanyahu for the post of Minister of Finance.

On 25 October 2012, Prime Minister and Likud chairman Benjamin Netanyahu and Foreign Minister and Yisrael Beiteinu chairman Avigdor Lieberman announced the unification of their two parties which would run as a single bloc for the upcoming election. The new party will be called Likud Beiteinu ("The Likud Is Our Home"), with Netanyahu number one on the list followed by Lieberman as number two.

The results of the Likud primaries indicated the absence of prominent Likud members currently serving as ministers from the top positions in the new Likud list (namely, Benny Begin, Michael Eitan, Dan Meridor and Avi Dichter), and on the other hand the entry of two other politicians who were positioned in top positions in the new Likud list - Tzachi Hanegbi (who left the Kadima party and joined the Likud party), and Moshe Feiglin, who is considered a political hardliner with a unique political perspective that emphasizes policies that reflect Israel's Jewish identity.

On 14 December Avigdor Lieberman resigned as the Israeli Foreign Affairs Minister and as Deputy Prime Minister following an indictment for fraud.

=== Yesh Atid ===
The Yesh Atid list

1	Yair Lapid	2	Shai Piron
3	Yael German	4	Meir Cohen
5	Yaakov Peri	6	Ofer Shelah
7	Aliza Lavi	8	Yoel Razvozov
9	Adi Koll	10	Karin Elharar
11	Mickey Levy	12	Shimon Solomon
13	Ruth Calderon	14	Pnina Tamano-Shata
15	Rina Frenkel	16	Yifat Kariv
17	Dov Lipman	18	Boaz Toporovsky
19	Ronen Hoffman	20	Tal El-Al

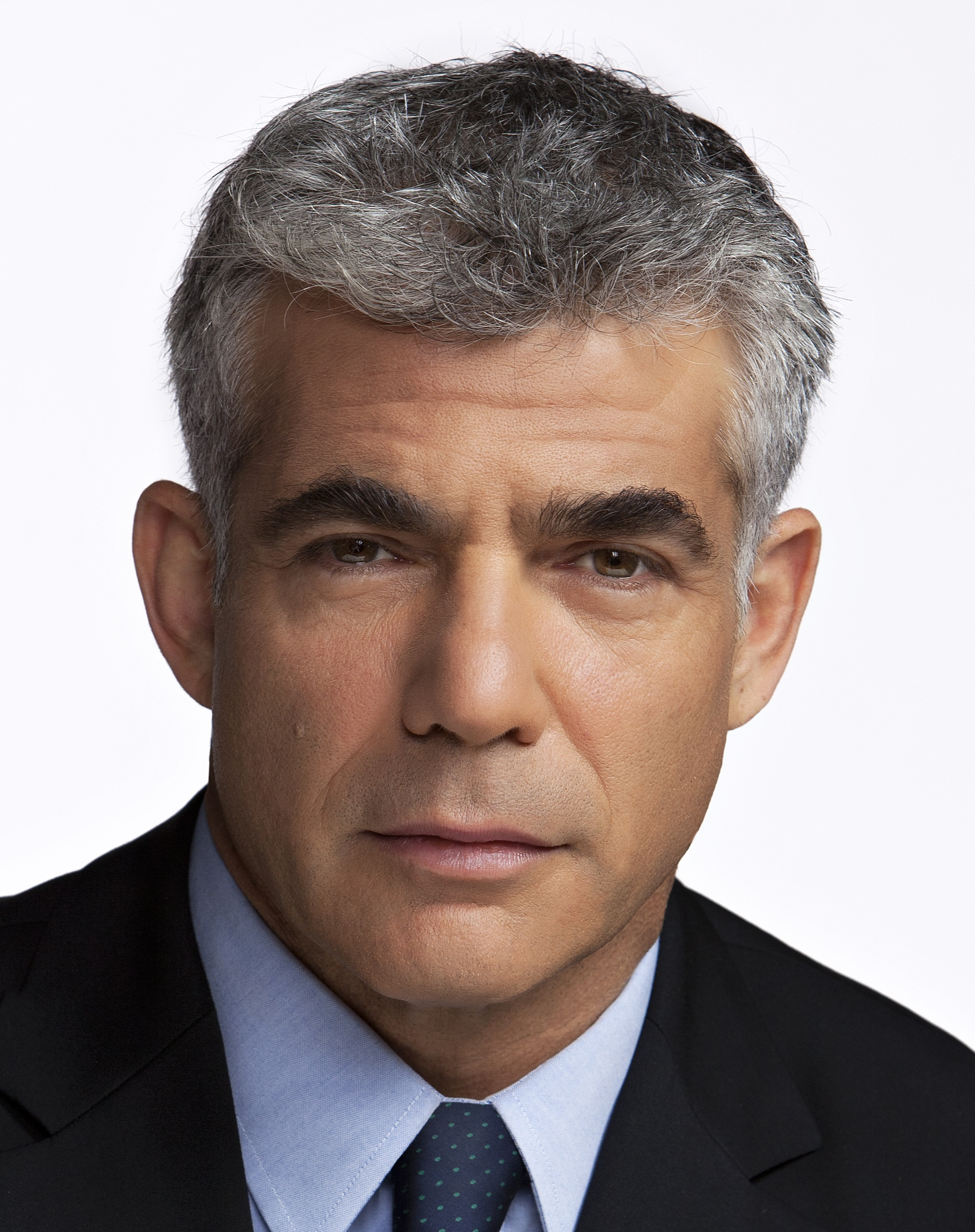
In January 2012 TV personality Yair Lapid announced that he was leaving his journalism career in order to enter politics.

During the term of the Israeli 32nd government speculation arose concerning the possibility that Israeli journalist and television personality Lapid would end his career in journalism and begin a career in Israeli politics. Initially, Lapid dismissed these reports and speculations.

Due to the ethical conflict between Lapid's functioning as a journalist and his political aspirations, Lapid informed Channel 2's CEO that he would resign six months before entering politics. Lapid's commitment did not stop the Knesset legislation proceedings aimed at preventing the influx of Israeli journalists running for a position in the Knesset during their first year after they ended their journalist careers.

Despite Lapid's denials about going into politics and in light of his obligations to end his journalism career long before that, Lapid officially announced in early January 2012 that he was leaving his journalism career in order to enter politics and that he would lead a new party. Lapid continued to write his weekly column in Yediot Aharonot until the elections were officially announced.

Lapid ultimately decided to name his party Yesh Atid. His father's (Tommy Lapid) secular movement party Shinui used the election symbol 'yesh'. The party will have to submit a list of 100 founders and will be capped at raising 13.5 million shekels during this election cycle.

=== Labor Party ===
Israeli Labor Party leadership election
Yachimovich
Peretz
54.2% (22,257)
45.8% (18,822)
The Labor Party list

1	Shelly Yachimovich	2	Isaac Herzog
3	Eitan Cabel	4	Merav Michaeli
5	Benjamin Ben-Eliezer	6	Yehiel Bar
7	Omer Bar-Lev	8	Stav Shaffir
9	Avishai Braverman	10	Erel Margalit
11	Itzik Shmuli	12	Mickey Rosenthal
13	Michal Biran	14	Nachman Shai
15	Moshe Mizrahi	16	Danny Atar
17	Raleb Majadele	18	Nadia Hilou
19	Nino Abesadze	20	Yossi Yona
21	Daniel Ben-Simon	22	Ofer Kornfeld
23	Hili Tropper	24	Yona Prital
25	Saleh Saad	26	Yariv Oppenheimer
27	Gilad Kariv	28	Estee Kirmair
29	Baruch Zelts	30	Eran Charamuni

At the start of 2011, Labor leader Ehud Barak began to face dissent from his party over its presence in the coalition. On 17 January 2011, disillusionment with Barak, over his support for coalition policies, especially regarding the peace process, led to his resignation from the Labor Party with four other Knesset members to establish a new "centrist, Zionist and democratic" party named Independence. Following this move, all Labor Party government ministers resigned. Splitting the Labour Party enabled Barak to keep a faction of Labour MKs loyal to him within Netanyahu's coalition, preventing the departure of all 13 Labour MKs from the coalition. Due to the split, the party remained without a chairman for a while and was even regarded in the public and the media as a party in demise. However, Barak's departure led to increased interest in the party, particularly since the remaining members began campaigning to win the position of party chairman.

In the first round of voting, which was held on 12 September 2011, MK Shelly Yacimovich managed to get first position, narrowly defeating runner-up Amir Peretz. In the third and fourth places were Isaac Herzog and Amram Mitzna. Since no candidate topped the 40% threshold required, a second round was held a week later on 21 September 2011, in which Yachimovich was able to beat Peretz in a gap of about 10%.

Yachimovich's victory, which placed the emphasis of the party on social values rather than issues of national security, brought a renewed interest in the party following the 2011 social protest and as a result, many polls predicted that the party might win nearly 20 seats, which would make the party become the second largest party after Likud on the account of Kadima. Down the road, and especially after Yair Lapid declared that he would enter politics, Yachimovich's popularity and the popularity of the party were slightly moderated. In January 2012 the party got a lot of media attention after Noam Shalit (father of Gilad Shalit) and former head of the Unit of International Crime Investigations Moshe Mizrahi both announced that they would be joining the party.

=== The Jewish Home ===
The Jewish Home leadership election
Bennett
Orlev
67.1% (23,645)
32.7% (11,501)
The Jewish Home List

1	Naftali Bennett	2	Uri Ariel
3	Nissan Slomiansky	4	Eli Ben-Dahan
5	Ayelet Shaked	6	Uri Orbach
7	Zevulun Kalpa	8	Avi Vartzman
9	Moti Yogev	10	Orit Strook
11	Yoni Chetboun	12	Shuli Mualem
13	Hillel Horowitz	14	Jeremy Gimpel
15	Nachi Eyal	16	Rabbi Rachamim Nissimi
17	Amiti Cohen	18	Gila Finkelstein
19	Uri Bank	20	Doron Daneinu

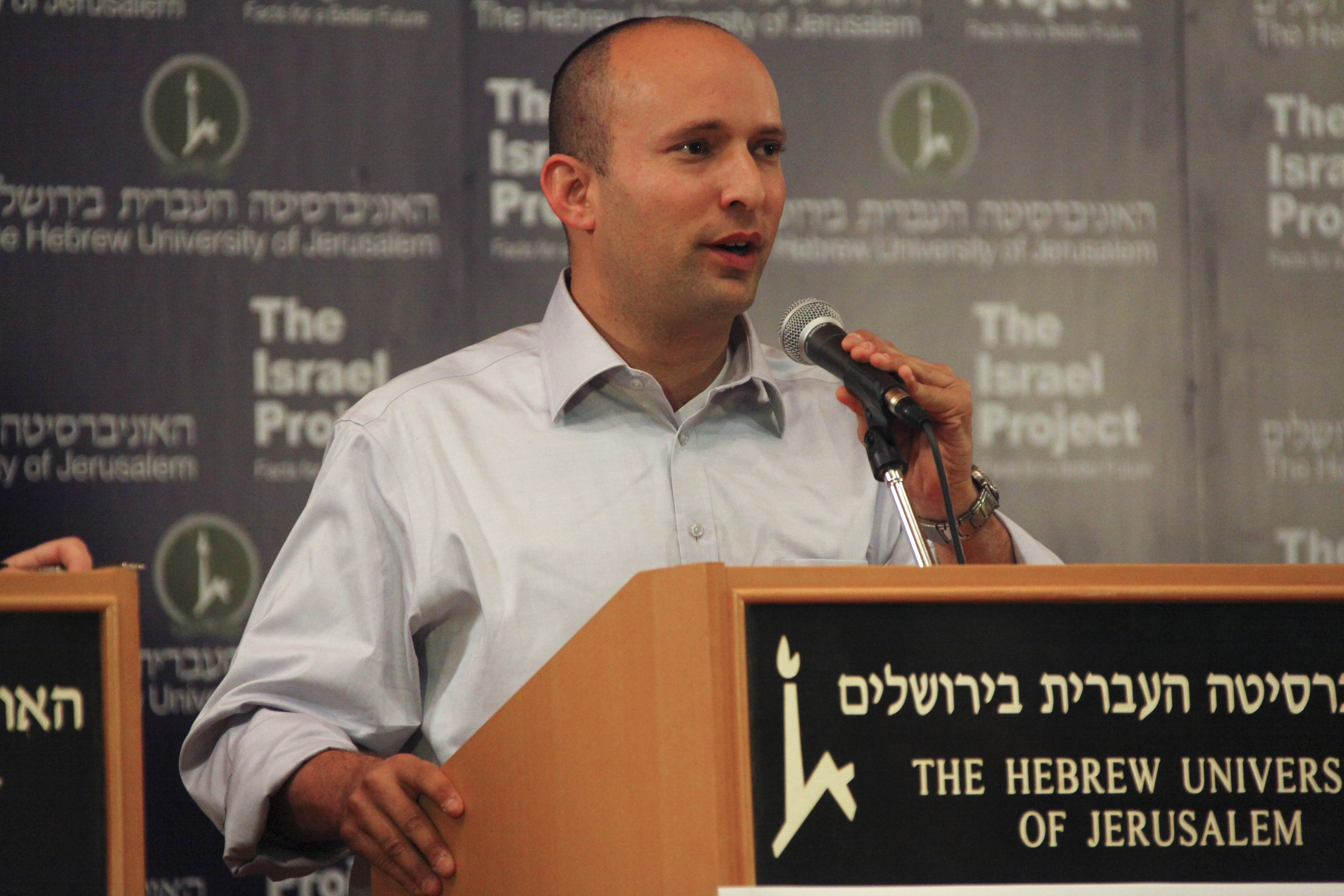
The winner of The Jewish Home party primaries – Naftali Bennett.

The Jewish Home and the National Union (an alliance of four parties – Tkuma, Hatikva, Eretz Yisrael Shelanu, and Moledet) began preparing for the possibility of running in a joint list for the 2013 elections during the term of the 18th Knesset. While negotiations were successful in principle and the two parties reached consensus, disagreements arose regarding the selection of candidates for the Knesset, as The Jewish Home supported the idea of running open primaries while The National Union opposed it. In September 2012, Ya'akov Katz (Moledet) signed an agreement with Jewish Home leadership candidate Naftali Bennett to form a joint list for the elections. On 12 October 2012, Michael Ben-Ari (Eretz Yisrael Shelanu) announced that due to not being placed in realistic spots, he and Aryeh Eldad (Hatikva) would be running in a separate pro-Land-of-Israel alliance, called Otzma LeYisrael. Meanwhile, Tkuma decided to run together with the Jewish Home. As part of the agreement, it was established that Naftali Bennett would serve as the alliance's chairman while Uri Ariel would be in the second position of the list and that after the elections both parties would merge into a single party. Uri Bank and his Moledet party also joined.

The primaries were held on 6 November 2012 for the position of the party's chairman. Naftali Bennett was elected as the chairman with 67.1% of the votes. Zevulun Orlev, who was second with 32.7% of the votes, declared that he would end his political career following his defeat.

=== Shas ===
The Shas list

1	Eli Yishai	2	Aryeh Deri
3	Ariel Atias	4	Yitzhak Cohen
5	Meshulam Nahari	6	Amnon Cohen
7	Ya'akov Margi	8	David Azulai
9	Yitzhak Vaknin	10	Nissim Ze'ev
11	Avraham Michaeli	12	Yoav Ben Tzur
13	Lior Edri	14	Ami Iluz
15	Eli Dadoun	16	Gershon Levi

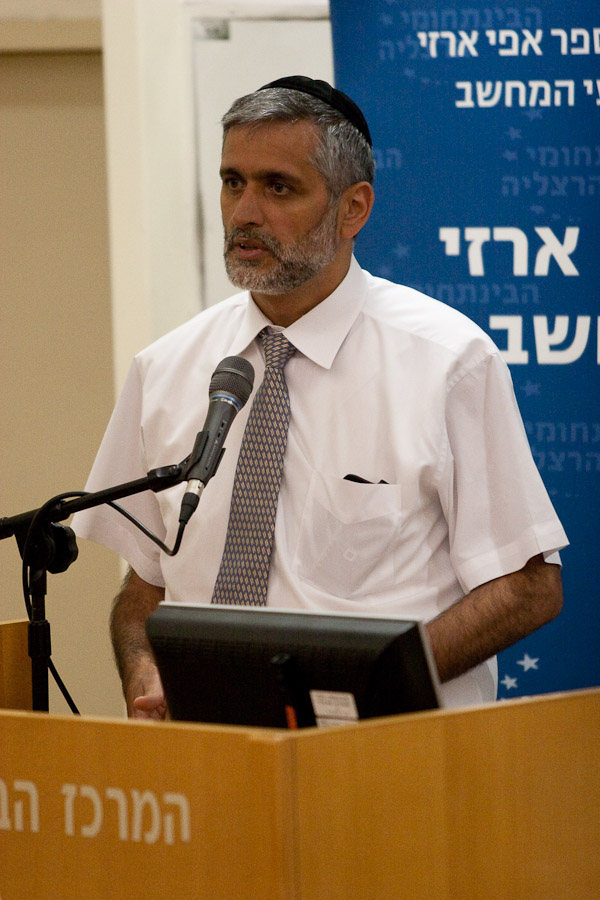
Shas party leader Eli Yishai

After Aryeh Deri announced his return to politics, and following a series of highly publicised events that led to an increase in the tensions between the Haredi public and the non-Haredi public, Shas's popularity began to falter according to most polls. As a result, Shas chairman Eli Yishai requested that Aryeh Deri join the party instead of establishing an independent party. Shas spiritual leader Ovadia Yosef offered Aryeh Deri the 3rd position on the party list, but Deri rejected it at first and was believed to want to lead the party, start his own party (which according to polls might win as many as 7 seats), or not participate in the election at all. On 16 October a compromise was reached: Shas would not have a formal chairman, but would instead be jointly led by Deri, Yishai, and Housing and Construction Minister Ariel Atias. The direction of the election campaign is in debate, with reports suggesting that Yishai wishes to focus on fighting illegal immigration, and Deri favoring focusing on social justice issues while avoiding mentions of Shas's treatment of Sudanese refugees in Israel.

=== United Torah Judaism ===
The UTJ list

1	Yaakov Litzman	2	Moshe Gafni
3	Meir Porush	4	Uri Maklev
5	Eliezer Moses	6	Yisrael Eichler
7	Ya'akov Asher	8	Ya'akov Guterman

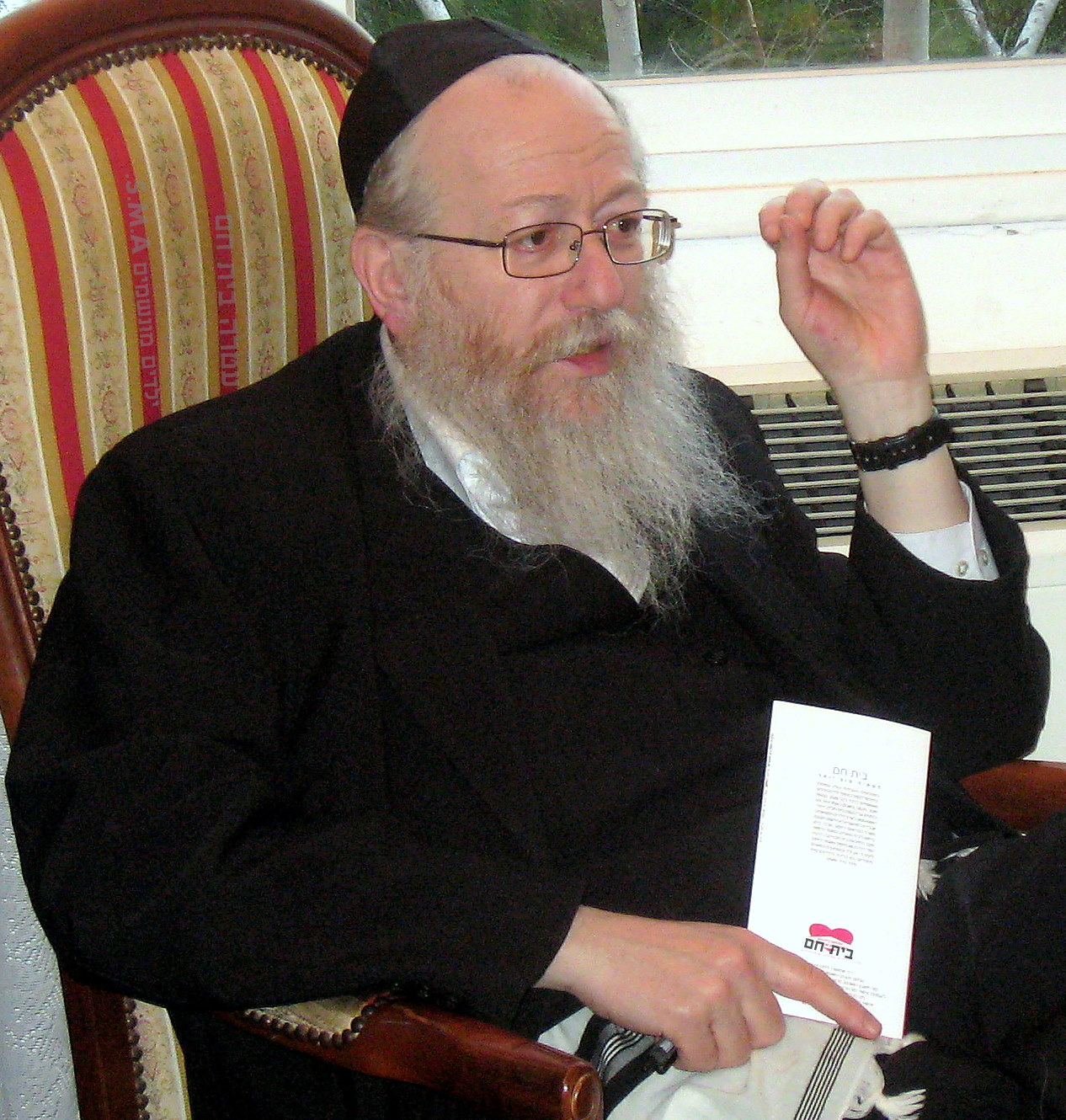
United Torah Judaism's chairman – Yaakov Litzman.

United Torah Judaism is an alliance of two Haredi parties, the Hasidic Agudat Israel party and the Lithuanian Degel HaTorah party.

In 2012, a split occurred among the Lithuanian Haredi public, as a group within the Degel HaTorah party which regards itself as the successor of Rabbi Elazar Shach and affiliated with Rabbi Shmuel Auerbach, felt that it is not represented by the party. After it was announced that early elections would be held, a group of people associated with Rabbi Auerbach registered a new party under the name Netzah. After Menachem Carmel, who is affiliated with this group, did not win the third position in the United Torah Judaism list, it was officially announced that the "Netzah" would be running in the 2013 Israeli legislative election.

=== Hatnua ===
The "Hatnua" List

1	Tzipi Livni	2	Amram Mitzna
3	Amir Peretz	4	Elazar Stern
5	Meir Sheetrit	6	David Tzur
7	Yoel Hasson	8	Shlomo Molla
9	Meirav Cohen	10	Orit Zuaretz
11	Aharon Valensi	12	Majalli Wahabi
13	Alon Tal	14	Robert Tiviaev

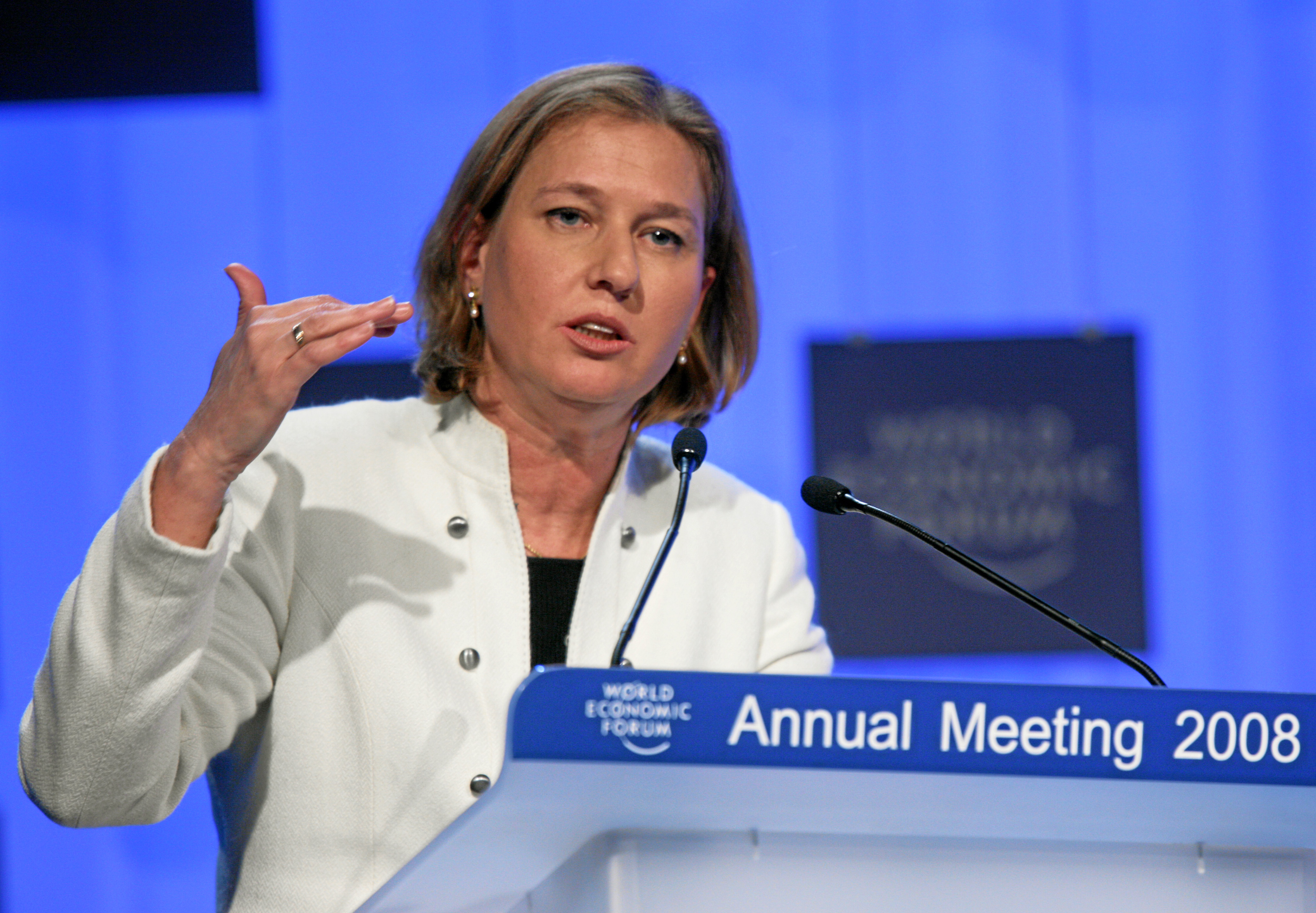
Tzipi Livni

Since she lost the primaries for the leadership of the Kadima party and resigned from the Knesset, many reports spread in the Israeli media of Tzipi Livni's possible return to politics as the head of a new party of her own. Those reports eventually turned out to be true on 27 November, when the logo for her new party titled "Hatnua - headed by Tzipi Livni" was initially published. At a press conference held during the same day, Livni officially announced the establishment of the Hatnua party which would be headed by her and which would participate in the upcoming elections. "Hatnua" (התנועה) means "The Movement" in Hebrew.

Immediately after the establishment of Hatnua party, seven Knesset members from the Kadima (Meir Shitrit, Yoel Hasson, Shlomo Molla, Robert Tiviaev, Majalli Wahabi, Rachel Adato and Orit Zuaretz) announced that they have left the Kadima party and joined Livni's party. On 1 December, it was announced that the Former Labor chairman Amram Mitzna joined Livni's party.

=== Meretz ===
Primaries for the leadership of Meretz
Gal-On
Gilon
60.6% (506)
36.6% (306)
The Meretz List

1	Zehava Gal-On	2	Ilan Gilon
3	Nitzan Horowitz	4	Michal Rozin
5	Issawi Frej	6	Tamar Zandberg
7	Avshalom Vilan	8	Mossi Raz
9	Yifat Solel	10	Uri Zaki

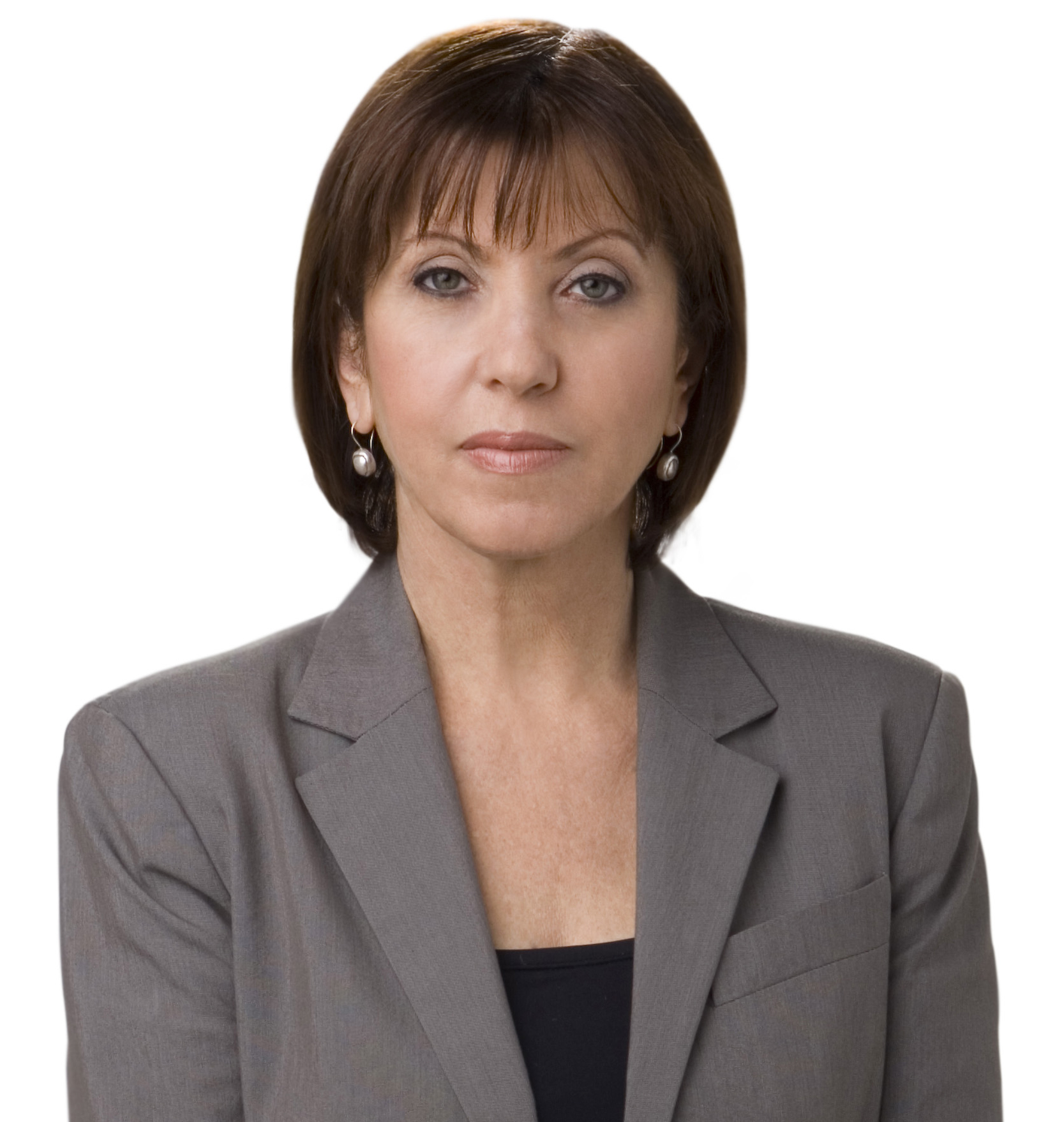
The winner of the Meretz leadership election - Zehava Gal-On.

Following the party's poor performance in the 2009 legislative elections, some of the party members called for the resignation of the party chairman Chaim Oron and to give way for Zehava Gal-On. Haim Oron indeed left the Knesset and later left the chairmanship of the party. As a result, MKs Zehava Gal-On, Ilan Gilon, and youth activist Ori Ophir began campaigning to win the position of the party chairman.

The primaries were held on 7 February 2012 for the position of the party's chairman. Zehava Gal-On was elected as the chairman with 60.6% of the votes. Ilan Gilon was second with 36.6% of the votes, and Uri Ofir was third with 2.8% of the votes.

Primaries were held on 11 November 2012 for the party list for the upcoming elections. The party list is as follows (in order): Zehava Gal-On, Ilan Gilon, Nitzan Horowitz, Michal Rozin, Issawi Frej, Tamar Zandberg, Avshalom Vilan, Mossi Raz, Yifat Solel and Uri Zaki.

Haaretz endorsed Meretz for the 2013 election, and gave honorable mention to Tzipi Livni's Hatnua.

=== Ra'am–Ta'al ===
Ra'am–Ta'al is an alliance of the two Arab parties Ra'am and Ta'al which was first formed prior to the 2006 Israeli legislative elections. The party list is as follows (in order): Ibrahim Sarsur (party chairman), Ahmed Tibi, Masud Ghnaim, Taleb Abu Arar, Taleb el-Sana, Muhammad Cnaan.

=== Hadash ===
The Hadash list

1	Mohammad Barakeh	2	Hana Sweid
3	Dov Khenin	4	Afu Agbaria
5	Nabila Espanioly	6	Ayman Odeh

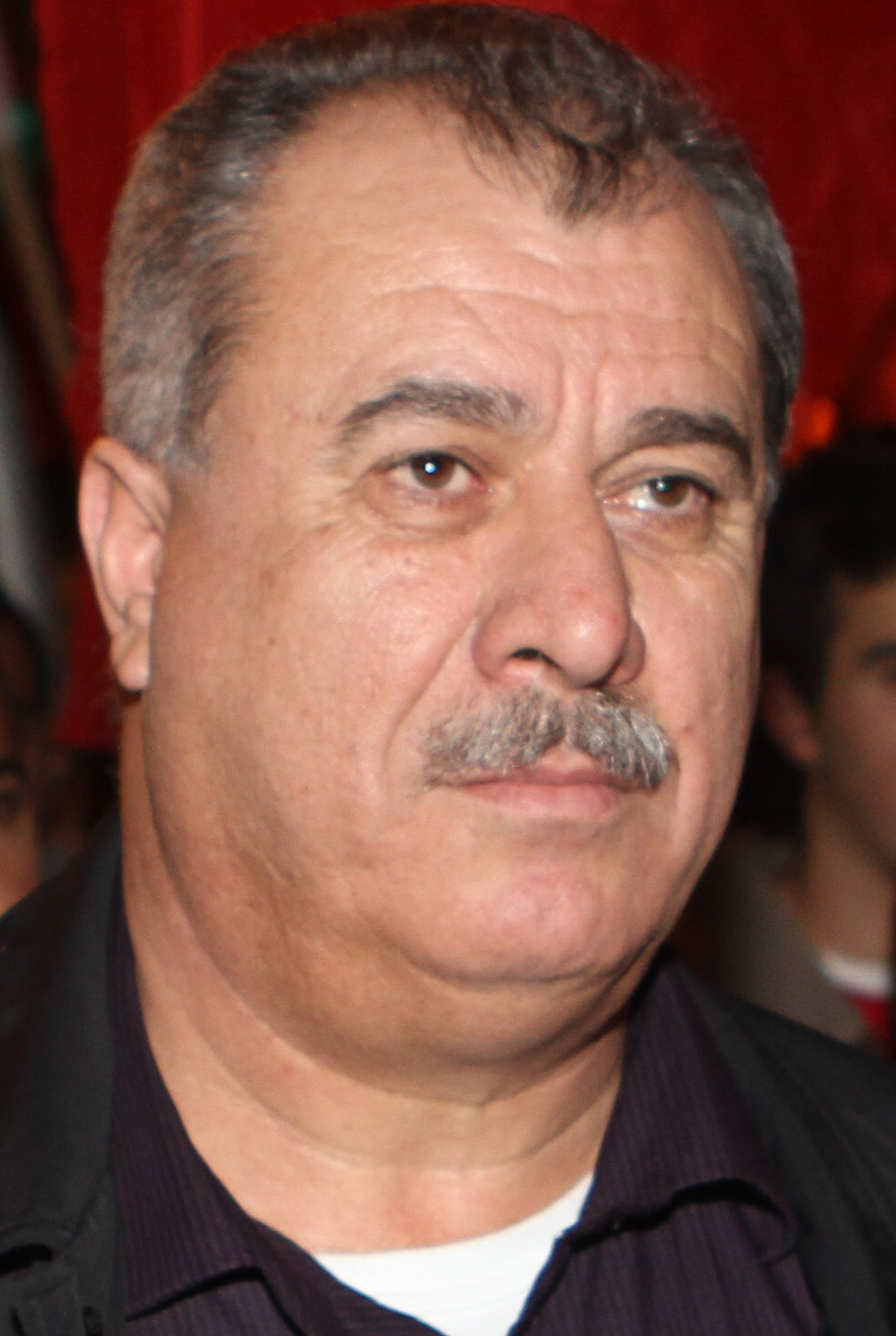
Hadash's chairman – Mohammad Barakeh.

Primaries were held on 10 November 2012 for the party list for the upcoming elections. The party list is as follows (in order): Mohammad Barakeh (party chairman), Hana Sweid, Dov Khenin, Afu Agbaria, Nabila Espanioly, and Ayman Odeh.

The party delegates also voted to decline the proposal to reserve a certain number of seats in the list for female representatives (79% were against this proposal).

=== Balad ===
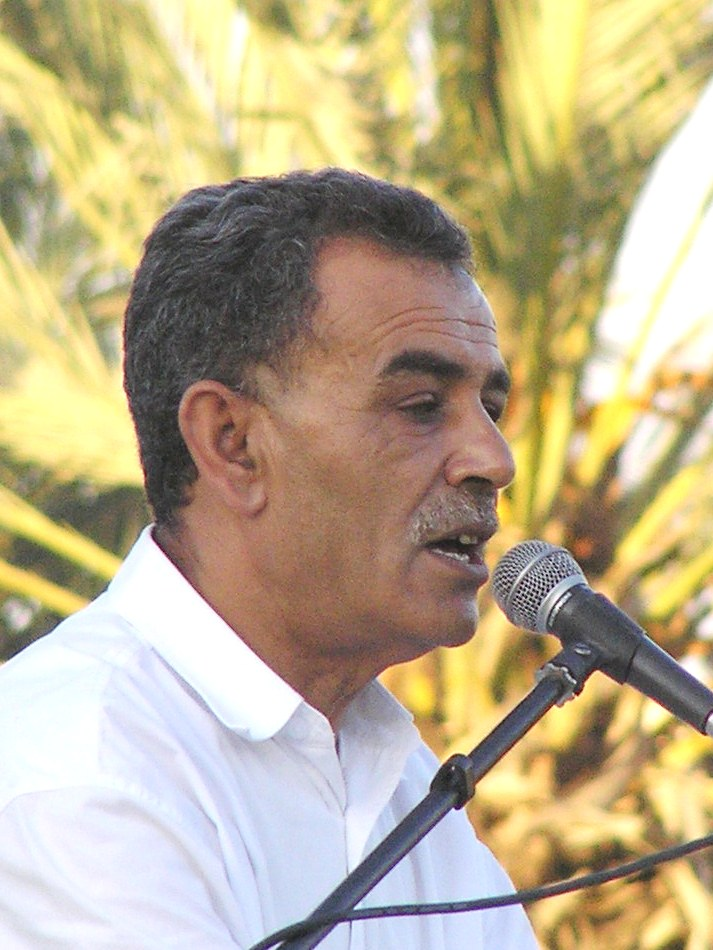
Balad's chairman – Jamal Zahalka.

The party list is as follows (in order): Jamal Zahalka (party chairman), Haneen Zoabi, Basel Ghattas, Juma Azbargh, and Abed Fukra. In December 2012, it was announced that the Central Elections Committee and a panel of Supreme Court judges would hold discussions on whether to disqualify Haneen Zoabi, as well as the Balad party, from the 2013 election. The request for her disqualification, submitted by MK Ofir Akunis (Likud) and which obtained the necessary number of signatures, stated that, "throughout her years in the Knesset, Zoabi has constantly undermined the State of Israel and has openly incited against the government, its institutions, and IDF soldiers". The request further alleged that Zoabi rejects Israel's existence as a Jewish and democratic state, which makes Knesset candidates eligible for disqualification. Zoabi called the sponsors of the request fascists and said that "for whoever does not want citizens to have free elections, I am one of many targets ..." After hearing the case, the Central Elections Committee disqualified Zoabi in a 19–9 vote. The Israeli Supreme Court unanimously overturned the disqualification.

=== Kadima ===
Kadima leadership election
Mofaz
Livni
62.3% (23,987)
37.7% (14,516)
The Kadima list

1	Shaul Mofaz	2	Yisrael Hasson
3	Yohanan Plesner	4	Ronit Tirosh
5	Shai Hermesh	6	Yuval Tzelner
7	Doron Avital	8	Akram Hasson
9	Ahmad Dabbah	10	Eti Livni

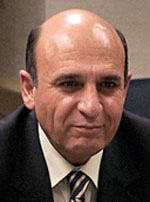
The winner of the Kadima primaries - Shaul Mofaz.

Prime Minister Netanyahu's announcement about having early primaries in the Likud started a debate among the Kadima party members over when to hold leadership elections for their party. Following increasing pressure to hold the election, party leader Tzipi Livni announced that the election for the leadership of Kadima would be held on 27 March 2012. In addition to Livni, party members Shaul Mofaz and Avi Dichter announced their intention to run for chairman position of the party.

Mofaz won the election 62.3% to 37.7% with a turnout of approximately 40%. Livni later resigned from her seat in Knesset complaining that Israel was sitting "on a volcano. The international clock is ticking and the existence of Israel as a Jewish and democratic state is in danger. For years, Israeli leaders have been burying their heads in the sand, occupying themselves with political exercises and spin and in that time the threat to Israel has only grown."

=== Otzma LeYisrael ===
The Otzma LeYisrael list

1	Aryeh Eldad	2	Michael Ben-Ari
3	Baruch Marzel	4	Aryeh King

Following the negotiations between the National Union alliance and The Jewish Home party, MK Michael Ben-Ari, along with Baruch Marzel and Itamar Ben-Gvir (all Eretz Yisrael Shelanu members), announced that they do not plan to stay in such an alliance, and they would form an independent party. MK Aryeh Eldad from the Hatikva party decided also not to take part in the alliance.

On 13 November 2012, they announced that they formed a new joint list called Otzma LeYisrael.

=== Am Shalem ===
The Am Shalem list

1	Haim Amsalem	2	Moshe Tsarfati
3	Reuven Agasi	4	Daniela Yekira

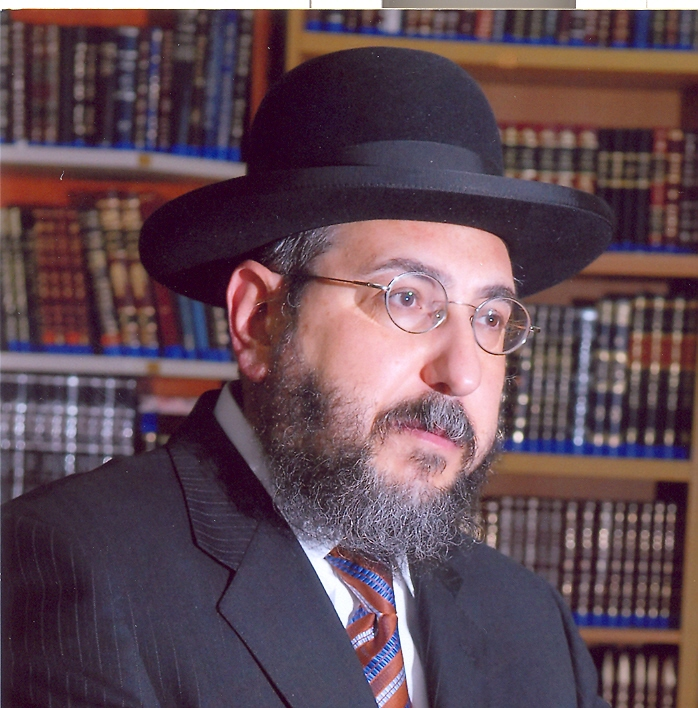
Haim Amsalem

Rabbi Haim Amsalem was elected to the Knesset as a Shas member during the 17th and 18th legislative elections, as the representative of Rabbi Meir Mazoz, the head of the Kisseh Rachamim yeshiva. During the 18th Knesset, Amsalem began to publicly hold controversial positions on key issues such as conversions to Judaism (he would not require a pledge to follow Torah laws), the enforcement of Haredi public integration in the work force, the status of women in Israel, etc. His positions caused a rift between him and the Shas party, which eventually led the Council of Torah Sages (מועצת חכמי התורה) to call for his resignation, and lead to complaints against him from public Haredi bodies. On the other hand, in 2011, he received the Knight of Quality Government Award on behalf of the Movement for Quality Government in Israel.

After Amsalem quit the Shas party, he established a new political movement called "Am Shalem" (a play of words on his last name), and announced that it would take part in the election.

=== Other parties ===
- Ale Yarok - merged with members of New Liberal Movement under the name "Ale Yarok-The Liberal List" (עלה ירוק-הרשימה הליברלית). The party has never passed the threshold, and in the 18th elections, it won only 13 thousand votes.
- Da'am Workers Party - a Left Party which was active in the 2011 Israeli social justice protests. The head of the party is the Israeli Arab journalist Asma Agbarieh, who is the only Israeli Arab woman to ever head a political party. The party has been running since the 2001 Israeli legislative election, but has failed so far in passing the threshold.
- Dor – The new Pensioners party – the Gil party, which was one of the big successful parties in the 2006 Israeli legislative election and vanished from Israeli politics following its system failure in the 2009 Israeli legislative election, announced that it intends to run once again with the chairman Rafi Eitan under the new name "Dor – The new Pensioners party" (דור - מפלגת הגמלאים החדשה).
- The Finance Party – In May 2012, a new party called The Finance Party was formed in Israel by Danny Goldstein the leader of the party and Benny Goldstein, two mattress dealers from Ashkelon. The party focuses on a better financial economy for all citizen and peace between Israel and its Arab and Palestinian neighbors, which its platform states can be attained through joint business ventures such as shopping malls on Israel's borders with its neighbors; these businesses would be open to customers of both nationalities. The party has been described as being influenced by American ideas. Yossi Bublil, a top contestant on the Israeli Big Brother television program, was third on the party's list behind the Goldstein brothers. However, Bublil subsequently resigned from the party because he insisted on getting the number 2 spot. He was replaced by children's entertainer Yuval Hamevulbal. Aspiring Israeli pollster Yair Michaeli has said that he believes Calcala has "a fighting chance" of getting into the Knesset, although it will be an uphill battle. The party was headed by Yulia Shamalov-Berkovich.
- Eretz Hadasha ("New Land") – a new left-center party established by the film director Rani Blair and the attorney Eldad Yaniv, who headed the Israeli political movement The National Left. As part of the party's election online campaign, it published various provocative online videos about the alleged conduct of the current government officials.
- Kulanu Chaveirim – In October 2012, a new party called Kulanu Chaveirim ("We are all friends") was formed. The party is represented by members of the Na Nach Hasidic group, followers of Rebbe Nachman of Breslov, who are known for driving around Israel in colorful vans, blasting music, dancing in the streets, and selling the books of Rebbe Nachman and of Rabbi Yisroel Ber Odesser. The party's stated objectives are faith, trust, joy and unity amongst Jews. Sharon Kanaffo, one of the party's founders, said, "We believe the Israeli people love Rebbe Nachman of Breslov... we would love to have experts in security or economy join us, but only if they have good intentions and no secret agenda. The point is to make what we do all throughout the year on a larger scale... we want to have a positive impact on people's lives". Asked about the party's agenda, Kanaffo said, "Our list for the Knesset is full of people who only want to do good and help others... though we haven't thought of any specific law we would like to put forward yet".
- Netzah – Followers of Lithuanian Haredi rabbi Shmuel Auerbach launched a new party, called Netzah, that plans to run for the Knesset. Haaretz described this party as part of a general trend toward fragmentation of Haredi politics as a result of divisions between so-called "New Haredim" and the more traditionally minded factions.
- The People's Party (מפלגת העם) – reunited prior to the 2009 election with some of the politicians who left the Ale Yarok party and ran then under the name "Holocaust Survivors and Grown-Up Green Leaf Party" (ניצולי השואה עם בוגרי עלה ירוק). In these elections, the party intends to run independently together with some of the main activists from the 2011 Israeli social justice protests.
- Pirate Party – In July 2012 former members of "Ale Yarok" and the "Holocaust Survivors and Grown-Up Green Leaf Party" applied to be officially recognized as a political party in time for the next Knesset election. They adopted the ideology and name of the Pirate parties around the world. The Pirate Party says it supports "the freedom to share and copy" and "the pirating sector".
- Additional parties running in the 19th Israeli legislative election include: Ahim Anahnu ("We are brothers"), Brit Olam LeGe'ulat Yisrael ("Covenant for the Redemption of Israel"), Haim BeKavod ("Living with Dignity"), HaTikva LeShinui ("The Hope for Change"), HaYisraelim, Koah Lehashpi'a, Or, Progressive Liberal-Democratic, Moreshet Avot, Atid Ehad, Tzedek Hevrati, The Green and Young for a Green Future in Israel.

== Opinion polls ==
=== Predictions ===
In 2013, during the elections to the Nineteenth Knesset, mentalist Lior Suchard was invited to predict the results of the elections about ten days before counting the votes. He wrote the results on a note enclosed in an envelope that was placed in a vault under strict guard at the Dizengoff Center in Tel Aviv throughout the days leading up to the election. After the counting of votes, it was revealed that Suchard had accurately predicted the results.

== Conduct ==
Election day was a public holiday. With few exceptions, voting centres were scheduled to be open from 7:00 until 22:00, whilst in communities with a population of less than 350, as well as in hospitals, prisons and detention centres, voting hours might start later and end earlier. Voters who reside more than 20 kilometres from voting centres were eligible for free transport vouchers from the day before the election with the return ticket valid until the next day. As of 11:00, 11.4% of voters had voted, an increase on the previous two elections.

A total of 5,656,705 people were eligible to vote in the 10,132 polling stations in Israel and 96 overseas. The cost of the election was estimated to be around 1.5–2 billion NIS, with around 180 million NIS spent on campaigning, of which 59.4 million was spent by the Likud Yisrael Beiteinu alliance.

== Results ==
Party	Votes	%	Seats	+/–
Likud Yisrael Beiteinu	885,054	23.34	31	–11
Yesh Atid	543,458	14.33	19	New
Labor Party	432,118	11.39	15	+2
The Jewish Home	345,985	9.12	12	+9
Shas	331,868	8.75	11	0
United Torah Judaism	195,892	5.16	7	+2
Hatnua	189,167	4.99	6	New
Meretz	172,403	4.55	6	+3
Ra'am	138,450	3.65	4	0
Hadash	113,439	2.99	4	0
Balad	97,030	2.56	3	0
Kadima	79,081	2.09	2	–26
Otzma LeYisrael	66,775	1.76	0	New
Am Shalem	45,690	1.20	0	New
Ale Yarok–The Liberal List	43,734	1.15	0	0
Eretz Hadasha	28,080	0.74	0	New
Koah Lehashpi'a	28,049	0.74	0	0
HaYisraelim	18,941	0.50	0	0
The Greens and the Youth	8,117	0.21	0	0
Dor	5,975	0.16	0	0
Living with Dignity	3,640	0.10	0	New
Da'am Workers Party	3,546	0.09	0	0
We are Brothers	2,899	0.08	0	New
Social Justice	2,877	0.08	0	New
We are all Friends	2,176	0.06	0	New
Pirate Party	2,076	0.05	0	New
Finance Party	1,972	0.05	0	New
Leader	1,352	0.04	0	0
Or	1,027	0.03	0	0
Brit Olam	761	0.02	0	0
Hope for Change	649	0.02	0	New
Moreshet Avot	461	0.01	0	New
Total	3,792,742	100.00	120	0
Valid votes	3,792,742	98.93		
Invalid/blank votes	40,904	1.07		
Total votes	3,833,646	100.00		
Registered voters/turnout	5,656,705	67.77		
Source: CEC

== Government formation ==
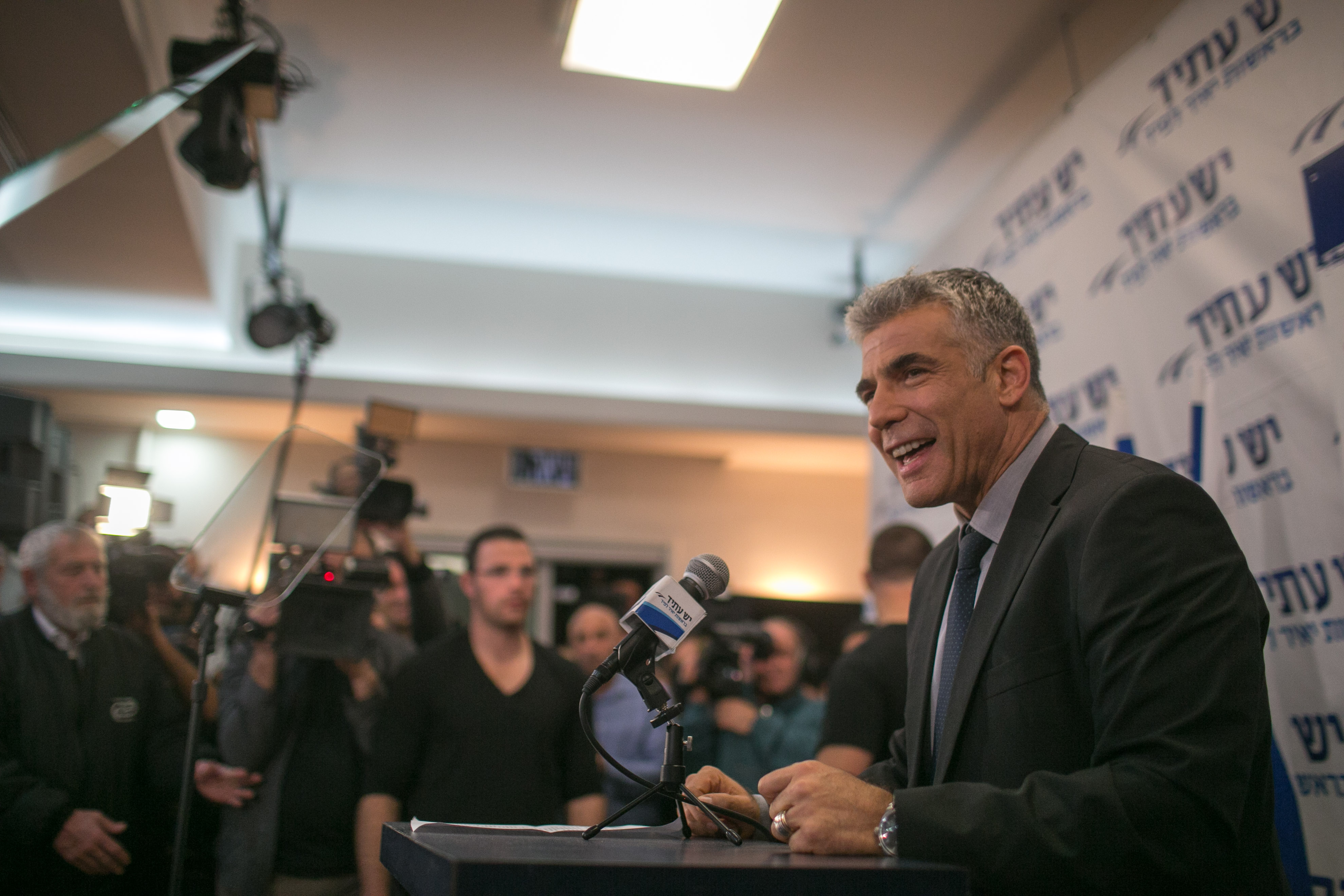
Party supporters celebrate the success of the centrist Yesh Atid party.

After the election, Netanyahu, the previous prime minister and leader of the largest bloc, announced that he wished to form "as broad a coalition as possible" and that he was willing to work with Yesh Atid. Labour chairwoman Shelly Yachimovich said she had made contacts with the aim of forming a centre-left coalition excluding Likud Yisrael Beitenu. Lapid, leader of Yesh Atid, announced that he would not join a coalition aimed at preventing Netanyahu from forming a new government. He also said that he would only join a government committed to reviving the peace process and to reforming the Tal Law.

Several days after the election, domestic media reported that Netanyahu's former chief of staff Natan Eshel would be involved in the negotiations. This move was criticised since Eshel had been involved in a sexual harassment scandal the year before, which resulted in him being banned from public service. Yesh Atid announced that it would not meet with Eshel under any circumstances.

In consultation meetings with President Shimon Peres, six parties representing 82 MKs (Likud Yisrael Beiteinu, Yesh Atid, The Jewish Home, Shas, United Torah Judaism, and Kadima) recommended that Netanyahu be asked to form a government, whilst the Labor Party, Hatnua, Meretz, Hadash, and the two Arab parties (38 MKs) did not recommend anyone. On 2 February, Peres formally tasked Netanyahu with forming a government.

Party	Party Leader	Seats	Recommended
Likud Yisrael Beiteinu	Benjamin Netanyahu	31	Benjamin Netanyahu
Yesh Atid	Yair Lapid	19	Benjamin Netanyahu
Israeli Labor Party	Shelly Yachimovich	15	No one
The Jewish Home	Naftali Bennett	12	Benjamin Netanyahu
Shas	Eli Yishai	11	Benjamin Netanyahu
UTJ	Yaakov Litzman	7	Benjamin Netanyahu
Meretz	Zehava Gal-On	6	No one
Ra'am	Ibrahim Sarsur	4	No one
Hadash	Mohammad Barakeh	4	No one
Balad	Jamal Zahalka	3	No one
Kadima	Shaul Mofaz	2	Benjamin Netanyahu
		82	Benjamin Netanyahu
		38	No one

On 19 February Netanyahu reached a coalition deal with Tzipi Livni, in which Hatnua agreed to join the coalition and Livni would be named as Justice Minister, placing her in charge of negotiations with the Palestinians. This was Netanyahu's first coalition deal. Likud Yisrael Beiteinu and Hatnua together controlled 37 seats, 24 short of the 61 needed to form a government. The Jewish Home issued a statement criticizing the coalition and saying that Livni's inclusion made the Bennett-led party less likely to join.

Yesh Atid and The Jewish Home announced a pact that neither would join the government without the other. This prevented Netanyahu from forming a coalition with only one of those parties along with the Haredi parties (Shas and United Torah Judaism), though Yesh Atid's Lapid was quoted as saying he would not join a government with the Haredim and such a scenario was considered unlikely given Yesh Atid's platform of ending Haredi exemptions from military service and personal animosities between the parties' leaders. On 25 February Likud announced that it had invited Yesh Atid and The Jewish Home to join the government. Netanyahu needed the support of both parties to have enough support to form a government.

By 5 March, Shas and UTJ had reportedly been informed they would not be joining the government. Yesh Atid began demanding more policy changes for the next government: public transportation on the Sabbath, an easier process for conversion to Judaism, and changes to the Chief Rabbinate.

A coalition of Likud Yisrael Beiteinu, Yesh Atid, The Jewish Home, and Hatnua was announced on 14 March 2013. This coalition won a vote of confidence in the Knesset on 18 March, and was sworn in later that day.
