= Pirate Party of Israel =

Israeli political party

Pirate Party of Israel הפיראטים
- Leader: Ohad Shem-Tov; Noam Kuzar; Dan Birron; Lidia Maletin
- Founded: July 2012
- Split from: Ale Yarok
- Preceded by: Holocaust Survivors and Grown-Up Green Leaf Party
- Ideology: Pirate politics E-democracy; Open government Network neutrality Environmentalism
- Political position: Centre
- International affiliation: Pirate Parties International

Election symbol
- פ ף ףז צף

Website
- www.piratim.org

The Pirate Party of Israel or Piratim (Hebrew: הַפִּירָאטִים) is a political party in Israel founded in 2012 by past members of the Holocaust Survivors and Grown-Up Green Leaf Party and Ale Yarok to promote the values of the international Pirate Party movement. Party candidates gathered 2,076 votes in the 2013 Knesset elections (0.05%), 895 votes (0.02%) in the 2015 elections and 816 votes (0.02%) in the April 2019 Knesset elections.

== Election results ==
=== Knesset ===
Election	Leader	Votes	%	Seats	+/−	Status
2013	Ohad Shem Tov	2,076	0.05	0 / 120	New	Extra-parliamentary
2015	Ohad Shem Tov	895	0.02	0 / 120	0	Extra-parliamentary
Apr 2019	Noam Kuzar	819	0.02	0 / 120	0	Extra-parliamentary
Sep 2019	Noam Kuzar	1,236	0.03	0 / 120	0	Extra-parliamentary
2020	Noam Kuzar	1,473	0.03	0 / 120	0	Extra-parliamentary
2021	Ohad Shem Tov	1,309	0.03	0 / 120	0	Extra-parliamentary
2022	Ohad Shem Tov	1,728	0.04	0 / 120	0	Extra-parliamentary
2026	Ohad Shem Tov	1,049	0.02	0 / 120	0	Extra-parliamentary
