= List of minor political parties in Israel =

Israel has numerous minor political parties. Under the proportional representation electoral system used to elect members of the Knesset, parties required only 1% of the vote to win a seat in the legislature until the 1992 elections, when the electoral threshold was increased to 1.5%. This was raised to 3.25% prior to the 2015 elections. This article lists all parties to have contested a Knesset election, but failed to win seats.

== 2015–present (3.25% threshold) ==
Party	Elections	Notes
Ahi Movement (Brotherhood Movement)	2026	Haredi party affiliated with Haim Yosef Abergel.
Ale Yarok	1999, 2003, 2006, 2009, 2013, 2015	Party advocating for the legalisation of marijuana.
Arab National Party	2006, 2015	Formed in 1999 as a breakaway from the United Arab List and had two seats between 1999 and 2003.
Bible Bloc	Apr. 2019, Sept. 2019, 2020	
Brit Olam	2005, 2009, 2013, 2015, Apr. 2019	
Code Black	2026	Haredi party affiliated with the Jerusalem Faction
Da'am Workers Party	1996, 1999, 2003, 2006, 2009, 2013, Sept. 2019, 2020	Also known as the Organisastion for Democratic Action
Democratura	2015	
Fiery Youth	2022	led by Hadar Muchtar to combat the rising cost of living; received 8,800 votes
Flower Party	2015	Accused by Yachad as being a satellite list of Shas, as it used the same ballot symbol as Otzma Yehudit which ran on a joint list with Yachad.
Gan Eden (Garden Eden or Paradise)	2026	Headed by Yeshua Ben David, a Messianic Jew.
The Greens	1999, 2003, 2006, 2009, 2013, 2015	
Hakahal Party	2026	Haredi party
Haredi Public	2026	Haredi party
Hope for Change	2013, 2015	
Ihud Bnei HaBrit	Apr. 2019, Sep. 2019, 2020, 2021, 2022	Christian Arab party
Israel First	2026	Headed by Sharren Haskel
Justice for All	2019	Animal rights Party
Koah LeHashpi'a (Power to Influence)	2009, 2013, 2022	Advocated greater rights for disabled citizens.
Leader	2003, 2006, 2009, 2013, 2020	Party name was an acronym for "Progressive Liberal Democrat Party" (Hebrew: מפלגה מתקדמת ליברלית דמוקרטית, Miflaga Mitkademet Liberalit Demokratit)
Liberal–Economic Power	2020	Libertarian party established in 2019 by former members of Zehut; originally known as the New Liberal Party.
Living with Dignity	2013, 2015	
Mishpat Tzedek (Just Judgement)	2020, 2021, 2026	Headed by Larissa Amir, the wife of Yigal Amir, the assassin of Yitzhak Rabin.
Moreshet Avot (Heritage of the Fathers)	1999, 2013, 2015	Headed by Yosef Ba-Gad. Contested the 2015 elections under the name "Social Leadership".
Or (Light)	2009, 2013, 2015	Headed by Yaron Yadan, focussed on the separation of religion and state.
Partnership for All	2026	Arab party led by Talal Al-Qarinaui.
Pirate Party	2013, 2015, Apr. 2019, Sept. 2019, 2020	Based on the international Pirate Party model, and headed by former Holocaust Survivors and Ale Yarok Alumni leader Ohad Shem-Tov.
Rappeh	2021	opponent of COVID restrictions; received 17,346 votes
Sharshar	2026	Headed by Eitan Shvili also known as "Sharshar" who calls himself king.
Shavim	2019 (Apr)	co-founded by Tally Gotliv; received 401 votes
Social Leadership	2013, 2015, Apr 2019, Sep 2019, 2020	Led by Ilan Mashiqah Jer-Zanbar, used Moreshet Avot (former party of Yosef Ba-Gad) as a shelf party
U'Bizchutan (And by Their Merit)	2015	Party for ultra-Orthodox Jewish women.
We are all Friends Na Nach	2013, 2015	
Yachad	2015	Founded by former Shas leader Eli Yishai. Ran on a joint list with Otzma Yehudit in the 2015 elections.

== 1992–2013 (1.5% threshold) ==
Party	Elections	Notes
Ahavat Yisrael (Love Israel)	2003	
Ahrayut (Responsibility)	2009	Party advocating the creation of a constitution and the holding of regular referendums.
Am Shalem (Whole Nation)	2013	Formed by Haim Amsalem after he left Shas in 2010. The name was taken from his surname.
Casino Party	1999	
Citizen and State	2003	Party was taken over by Avraham Poraz prior to the 2006 elections and rebranded as Hetz
Economy Party	2013	Headed by Yulia Shamalov-Berkovich
Eretz Hadasha (New Country)	2013	Anti-corruption party headed by Eldad Yaniv.
Hatikva (The Hope)	1992	Headed by Charlie Biton
HaYisraelim (The Israelis)	2009, 2013	Founded by Gideon Doron, a professor of political science at Tel Aviv University and president of the Israeli Association of Political Science. In the 2009 elections it focussed on political reform, mainly introducing regional elections, the appointment of ministers who were experts in their area of responsibility, establishment of a constitution and equal representation of men and women. For the 2013 elections it was taken over by David Cone, a TV journalist with Channel 9 and focussed on the rights of new immigrants.
Holocaust Survivors and Grown-Up Green Leaf Party	2009	An alliance of some members of Ale Yarok and members of the "New Zionism" party, whose head was a Holocaust survivor and an activist for legalising cannabis, the main campaign issue for Ale Yarok.
Koah HaKesef (Power of Money)	1996, 2006, 2009	Established as the Settlement Party in 1996 following economic crises in many kibbutzim. However, following a deal signed in the same year between the government, the Kibbutz Movement and the banks, the party's activity ceased. Contested the 2006 elections as HaLev and the 2009 elections as Koah HaKesef.
Lahava (Flame)	2003	
Lazuz (To Move)	2009	Anti-corruption party, which also campaigned against high wages of executives.
Lehem (Bread)	2006, 2009	Party name was an acronym for "United Society Warriors" (Hebrew: לוחמי חברה מאוחדים, Lohamey Hevra Meuhadim)
Lev LaOlim (Heart to the Immigrants)	1999, 2006, 2009	Party for immigrants from Central Asia. Also known as "Lev".
Man's Rights in the Family Party	1996, 1999, 2003, 2006, 2009	Contested the 1999 and 2006 elections under the name "Justice for All"
Movement for Democracy and Aliyah	1992	Russian immigrant party, commonly known as "Da" (the party's abbreviation, and the Russian word for "Yes")
Movement for Mortgage Affected, Homeless and Demobilised Soldiers	1992	
Natural Law Party	1992, 1999	
Negev Party	1999	
New Arab Party	1999	
New Liberal Party	1992	Formed in 1990 as a breakaway from Likud and held three seats going into the 1992 elections.
The New Zionism	2006	
On Wheels	1992	
Oz LaAniyim (Strength to the Poor)	2006	
Pensioners, Immigrants and Senior Citizens	1992	
Pikanti	1992	
Pnina Rosenblum	1999	Headed by Pnina Rosenblum
Power for Pensioners	1999	Headed by Gideon Ben-Yisrael
Progressive Center Party	1999	
Progressive Confederation	1996	Breal-away faction from Progressive List for Peace led by Muhammad Zidan
Social Justice	2013	Formed in February 2007 by Arcadi Gaydamak
Tafnit (Turnaround)	2006	Anti-corruption party established by Uzi Dayan. Merged into Likud in 2008.
Tali	1992	
Telem Emuna	1996	Headed by Yosef Azran
Tikva (Hope)	1999	
Torah VeAretz (Torah and Country)	1992	Headed by Moshe Levinger
Tzabar	2009	Headed by Boaz Toporovsky
Tzipor	1992	
Unity for the Defence of New Immigrants	1996	Formed in 1990 as a breakaway from the Alignment and had one MK between 1990 and 1992.
We are Brothers	2013	
Women's Party	1977, 1992	Founded by Marcia Freedman. Headed by Ruth Rasnic in the 1992 elections
Yamin Yisrael	1996	Formed in 1995 as a breakaway from Moledet and held one seat going into the 1996 elections
Yisrael Aheret (Another Israel)	2003	
Yisrael HaMithadeshet	2009	Formed in 1999 as a breakaway from Yisrael BaAliyah and had two seats until the elections that year.
Yisrael Hazaka (Strong Israel)	2009	Breakaway from the Labor Party, headed by Efraim Sneh in 2008. Other members included Erela Golan and Michael Bar-Zohar. Focused on law and order.
Za'am	2003	

== 1949–1988 (1% threshold) ==
Party	Elections	Notes
Abolish Income Tax	1981	
Aliyah and Youth Movement	1984	
Amkha (Ordinary People)	1981, 1984	Headed by Victor Tayar
Arab Brotherhood List	1981	Christian Arab list headed by Haneh Hadad
Arab Citizens' List	1981	Bedouin list headed by Nuri al-Okbi
Arab List – The Centre	1955	General Zionists Arab satellite list
Arab Reform Movement	1977	Ratz Arab satellite list
Socialist Union (Bund)	1959	
Beit Yisrael (House of Israel)	1977	
Black Panthers	1973	Headed by Shalom Cohen
Blue White Panthers	1973	
Brit HaTzohar	1949	Headed by Aryeh Altman
Brotherhood Movement	1965, 1973	
Council to Rescue the Homeland	1981	
Derekh Aretz	1988	
Do Kiyum BeTzedek (Coexistence in Justice)	1977	Arab list headed based in Galilee headed by Hafez Mahmoud Shelby
For Jerusalem	1949	Headed by Daniel Auster
For New Immigrants and Demobilized Soldiers	1951	
Handicapped Organisation	1984	
Has Mas	1984	
Hofesh (Freedom)	1977	Headed by Shalom Cohen
Holocaust Handicapped and Injured Faction	1959	
Independence	1981, 1984	
Independent Faction for Israeli Arabs	1959	Headed by Masaad Kassis, Mapai Arab satellite list
Independents	1959	
Initiative – Independents Movement	1981	
Israeli Arab Labour Party	1959	Ahdut HaAvoda Arab satellite list
Israeli Arab List	1973	Likud Arab satellite list
Likud – Popular Economic Movement	1955	
List for Aliyah	1981	
List for the Land of Israel	1969	Headed by Israel Eldad, composed of members of the Movement for Greater Israel
Movement for Demobilised Soldiers	1988	
Movement for Moshavim	1988	Headed by Ra'anan Naim
Movement for Social Equality	1973	Headed by Avner Shaki
Movement for Social Justice	1988	Headed by Rafael Suissa
Movement for the Homeland	1984	
National Organisation for the Defence of the Tenant	1984	
National Union	1959	Headed by Shlomo Cohen-Tzidon
Nes (Miracle)	1965	Headed by Abie Nathan
New Generation	1977	
New Immigrants Front	1959	
New Immigrants' List	1955	
One Israel	1981	Formed by Yitzhak Yitzhaky in 1980 after he left Likud and held a single seat going into the 1981 elections.
Or Movement	1988	
Original Religious List	1955	
Otzma (Strength)	1981	Headed by Rafael Halperin
Peace List	1965	Rafi Arab satellite list
Peace List	1969	Headed by Gadi Yatziv
Pensioners	1988	
Pensioners' List	1981	
Popular Arab Bloc	1949	Mapam Arab satellite list
Popular Movement	1973	Headed by Asher Hassin
Religious Sephardim List	1961	
Sephardim-Ashkenazim Unity	1951	Headed by Eliyahu Kitov
Sephardi National Party	1959	Headed by Avner Shaki
Shiluv	1984	
Silent Power	1988	
Socialist Revolution List	1973	Far-left party led by Rami Livneh, son of MK Avraham Levenbraun and tied to Ma'avak.
Supporters of Democracy	1961	Arab party
Tarshish	1988	Headed by Moshe Dwek
Tent Movement	1981	
Third Power	1959	
Traditional Judaism List	1949	
Ultra-Orthodox List	1949	Headed by Eliyahu Kitov
Union of North African Immigrants	1959	
United List of Religious Workers	1949	Headed by Yeshayahu Leibowitz
Unity Party	1981	Formed in 1980 after the break-up of the Left Camp of Israel and held two seats going into the 1981 elections.
Unity – for Victor Tayar to the Knesset	1988	Headed by Victor Tayar
Workers Bloc	1949	Mapai Arab satellite list
Working and Religious Women	1949	Headed by Tova Sanhadray
Ya'ad	1981	Formed in 1978 after the break-up of the Democratic Movement for Change and held a single seat going into the 1981 elections
Yishai – Tribal Israel Together	1988	Headed by Shimon Ben-Shlomo
Yitzhak Gruenbaum List	1949	Headed by Yitzhak Gruenbaum
Young Israel	1965, 1969	
Youth Movement	1981	
Zionist Panthers	1977	
