= Daniel Ben-Simon =

Israeli journalist and politician (born 1954)

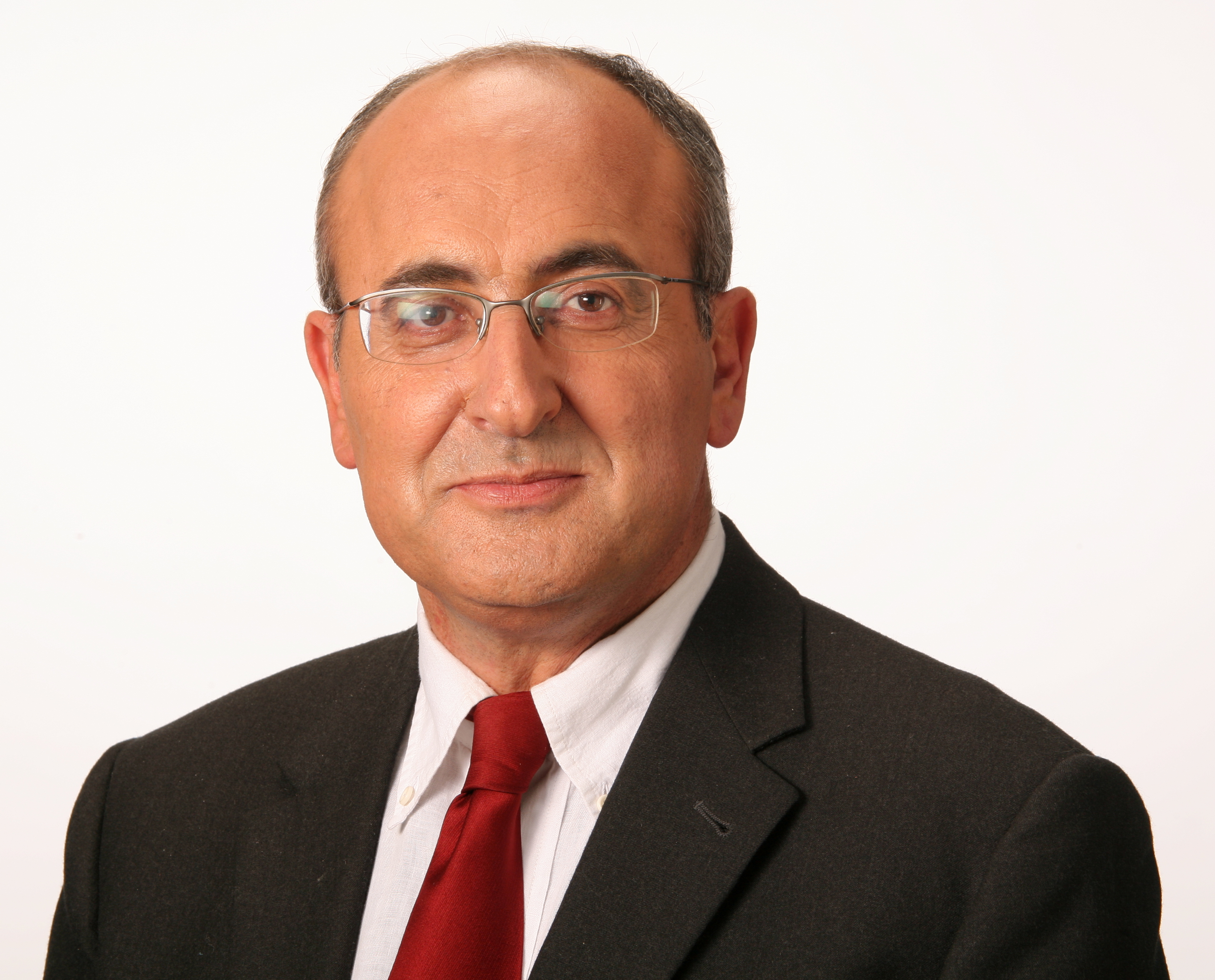
- Ben-Simon in 2008

Faction represented in the Knesset
- 2009–2013: Labor Party

Personal details
- Born: 29 April 1954 (age 72) Meknes, Morocco

Daniel Ben-Simon (Hebrew: דִּנִיֵּאל בֶּן סִימוֹן; born 29 April 1954) is an Israeli journalist and politician who served as a member of the Knesset for the Labor Party between 2009 and 2013.

== Biography ==
Born in Meknes in Morocco, Ben-Simon made aliyah to Israel in 1969. He did his national service in the Golani Brigade between 1972 and 1976. He later attended the University of Haifa, where he gained a BA in Sociology and political science, and Boston University, where he gained an MSc in journalism. He worked for Davar for over a decade and later for Haaretz. He taught journalism at Sapir College and Rupin College and also wrote four books, and was involved in the making of documentary films based on two of his books. He is a recipient of the Sokolov Prize.

Prior to the 2009 elections he joined the Labor Party, saying "I felt I had reached the limit of my ability to wield influence as a journalist. I reached the conclusion that you can score goals only on the playing field and not from the reporters' box". He won eleventh place on the party's list, and entered the Knesset as Labor won 13 seats. He initially objected to Labor's entrance into the Binyamin Netanyahu's government, but was elected chairman of Labor's Knesset faction on April 1, saying "the moment the party convention voted in favor [of joining], my resistance faded. I turned from an objector to one who obeys".

However, in October 2009 he resigned as chairman, and began pressuring the party to leave the coalition. In January 2011 he announced that he was leaving the Labor Party to establish an independent single-member faction in response to his failure to persuade the party to leave the government. However, he ultimately remained in the party, and was placed 21st on its list for the 2013 elections. He subsequently left the Knesset as the party won only 15 seats.
