= Haim Amsalem =

Israeli politician

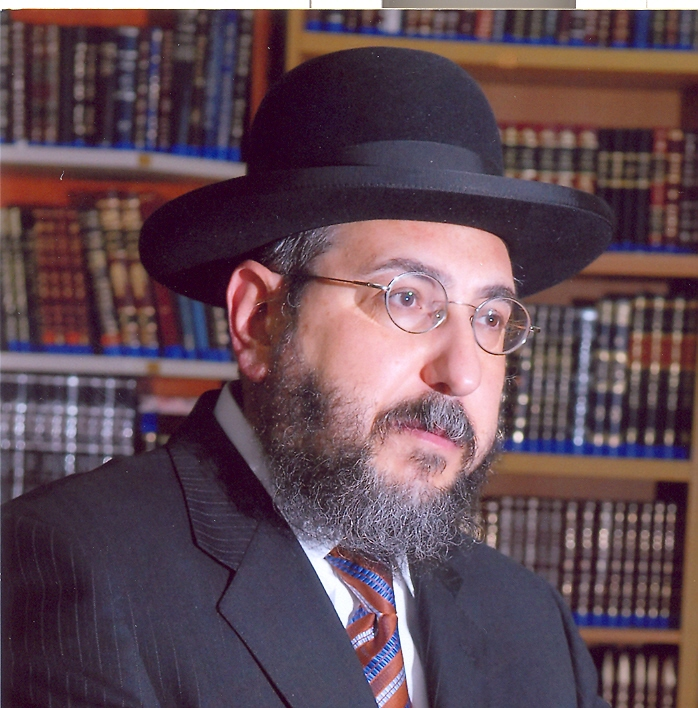
- Amsalem in 2007

Faction represented in the Knesset
- 2006–2012: Shas
- 2012–2013: Independent

Personal details
- Born: 12 October 1959 (age 66) Oran, French Algeria

Haim "Emile" Amsalem (Hebrew: חַיִּים (אֶמִיל) אַמְסָלֶם; born 12 October 1959) is an Israeli politician and a former member of the Knesset. Elected to the Knesset in 2006 as a representative of Shas, he left the party in 2011 and established Am Shalem. The new party contested the 2013 Knesset elections but failed to win a seat.

== Biography ==
Amsalem was born in Oran, French Algeria, to David and Freha Amsalem, who immigrated to there from Morocco. When he was six months old, his family moved to Lyon, France, where he grew up until the age of 11. In 1970 the family immigrated to Israel. He graduated from the Kisse Rahamim yeshivah where was ordained as rabbi in 1980, and served as a Head of Yeshiva ("RAM"). In 1990 he obtained certification as a rabbinical legal representative ("to'en rabbani"), and in 1993, he was ordained a City rabbi by the Chief Rabbi of Israel, Rabbi Ovadia Yosef.

In 1982 he married Hannah, the granddaughter of Rabbi Nissim Cohen, Av Beit Din in Djerba, Tunisia. After his marriage, he served as rabbi of the Sharsheret moshav for seven years. He has also served also as a neighborhood rabbi in Netivot, as Head of Yeshiva of "Ohalei Yaakov ve Tifereth Israel" and as Head of the kollel "Baba Sali" in the city. From there, he moved to the Har Nof neighborhood of Jerusalem, and established there the "Shirei David" Kollel in the name of his father. He was later appointed as rabbi of the Sephardic Jewish community, "Heichal Haness" in Geneva, Switzerland, a position he held until his entry into the Knesset.

A founding member of Shas, Amsalem was first elected to the Knesset in 2006, and was re-elected in 2009. After breaking away from Shas, he founded his own party, Am Shalem. In the 2013 elections, the new party failed to cross the electoral threshold of 2%, and Amsalem subsequently lost his Knesset seat. On 15 September 2014, the Yeshiva World News website reported that Amsalem would be running in the upcoming elections for the post of Chief Rabbi of Jerusalem.

Amsalem has written books in a variety of religious topics, and has published religious articles and Torah research papers in the religious publications "Ohr Torah", "Ohr Israel", "Beit Hillel", and more. He specialized in deciphering manuscripts and published writings of famous Sephardic scholars, including the "P'nei Moshe" by Rabbi Moshe Kalfon HaCohen and "Ya'amod Pinchas" by Rabbi Pinchas Abitbol. He lives in Har Nof, Jerusalem, and is married, with eight children.

In February 2019 Amsalem joined the Zehut party and was offered the number two spot on the list.

== Conversions ==
One of Amsalem's focuses has been in conversion to Judaism, and making the conversion process less stressful for the convert. He was one of the founding rabbis of Giyur keHalacha, and together with his protégé Rabbi Chuck Davidson, he has founded Ahavat HaGer, an organisation that aims to ensure that converts can go through the conversion process with a minimum of fuss. He called for an "independent conversion court system that will be run according to halacha, not politics".

He is an advocate for some leniency when dealing with the case of a halachically non-Jewish child with a Jewish parent if residing in Israel. He was even more lenient in the case of an IDF soldier, with Amsalem considering the army service itself to be the 'acceptance of the mitzvot', a key component in the conversion process. He was savaged for this stance in the Haredi press, and was called "worse than the "Conservatives" and that his views were "baseless and ridiculous".

Amsalem is relying on past Torah scholars, including Ben-Zion Meir Hai Uziel and he is well versed in the Jewish sources and has penned his own book, Zera Yisrael, which is an exhaustive summary of the sources connected to conversion, and shows his mastery of the topic. Defenders of Amsalem say that there is an ideal in the Haredi world to not be controversial and to follow the group think, and that this has only entered the religious sphere recently.

He has also attacked the Israeli Chief Rabbinate, as well as some other Beth Dins around the world, such as the London Beth Din and the Melbourne Beth Din, for retroactively cancelling conversions. Based on the Halacha, Amsalem argues that there is no basis for doing such a thing, and it is unprecedented in Jewish history. The only way this could happen is because of political considerations.
