= Shlomo Molla =

Israeli politician

- שלמה מולה
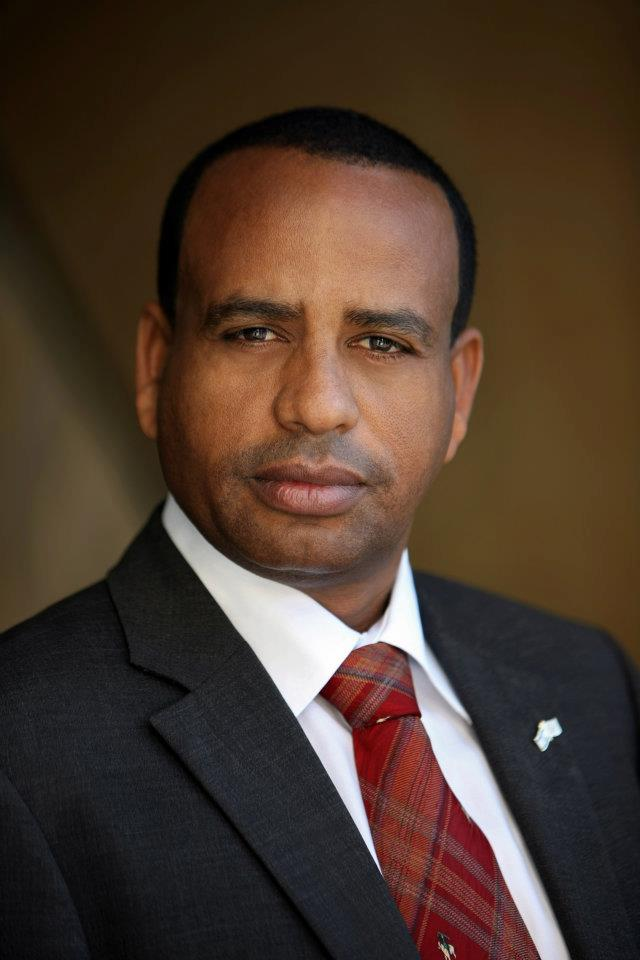

Faction represented in the Knesset
- 2008–2012: Kadima
- 2012–2013: Hatnuah

Personal details
- Born: 21 November 1965 (age 60) Gondar Province, Ethiopia
- Education: Bar-Ilan University (B.A.); Ono Academic College (LLB)

Shlomo Molla (Hebrew: שלמה מולה, Amharic: ሰሎሞን ሞላ; born November 21, 1965) is an Israeli politician who served as Deputy Speaker of the Knesset, becoming the first Ethiopian Jewish immigrant to hold the post, and as a member of the Knesset for Kadima and Hatnuah between 2008 and 2013. Molla was also Israel’s second Knesset member of Ethiopian Jewish origin.

== Biography ==
Molla was born in a small Jewish village of 40 families in Gondar Province in Ethiopia in 1965 into a family of 9 brothers and 2 sisters. In 1984, Molla attempted to make aliyah (immigrate) to Israel on foot from Ethiopia through Sudan, and was imprisoned by Sudanese authorities.

Israeli Mossad operatives rescued him and his Ethiopian Jewish travel companions from prison and subsequently from a refugee camp in Sudan. The Israelis gave them basic supplies to survive the camp, and shortly thereafter extracted Molla's group via the Israeli airlift carrying Ethiopian Jews to Israel.

During his journey in Sudan, one of the Ethiopian Jews traveling with him was shot and killed by Sudanese forces. Upon his arrival in Israel, Molla was placed in an immigrant absorption center in Safed. He suffered from malaria when he first arrived, and during his stay in the hospital, he began learning Hebrew.

After his national service in the Israel Defense Forces, he studied for a BA in social work at Bar-Ilan University. During his studies, he served as co-chairman of the Organization of Ethiopian Students. He later also gained an LLB from Ono Academic College.

== Career ==
In 1991, he became head of a Jewish Agency immigrant absorption center in Tiberias, and in 1995 was appointed supervisor of the absorption centers and ulpans in northern kibbutzim.

In 1996 he became a member of the Ministry of Health's committee to advise on war conditions, and in 1999 he became head of the Jewish Agency's Ethiopian Division. In the same year Molla won eighth place on Yisrael BaAliyah's list for the Knesset elections, but the party won only six seats. In 2006, he was a member of the Zionist Executive and head of department at the World Zionist Organization.

=== Knesset tenure ===
Prior to the 2006 elections he was placed thirty-third on Kadima's list. However, following the resignation of Avigdor Yitzhaki in February 2008, Molla became the second MK of Ethiopian origin. He was placed nineteenth on the Kadima list for the 2009 elections, and retained his seat as the party won 28 mandates.

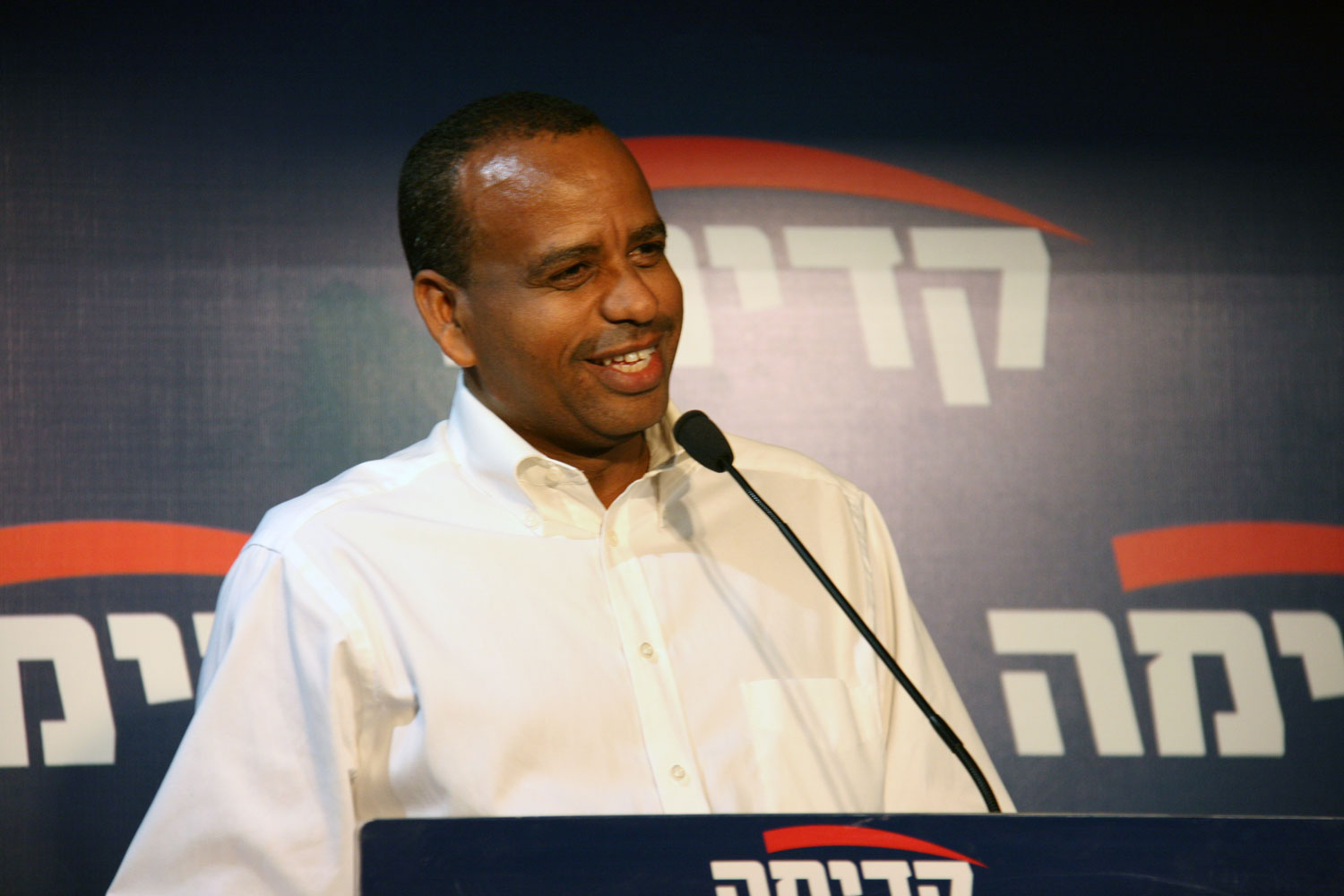
Photo of Molla in 2009

As a member of the Knesset, Molla advocated for a two-state solution. In 2012, he left Kadima to join the new Hatnuah party. Placed eighth on its list for the 2013 elections, he lost his seat when the party won only six seats.

=== Post-Knesset career ===
In 2015, he encouraged Ethiopian-Israelis to refuse to pay taxes or to serve in the Israeli armed forces to protest racist acts against Ethiopian-Israelis such as the police assault on Demas Fikadey. In 2019, Molla announced he joined Meretz.

== Personal life ==
Molla is married with three children, and lives in Rishon LeZion.
