= Daniel Goldstein (politician) =

- דניאל גולדשטיין
- Born: Waterville, Maine, United States
- Occupation: Politician
- Known for: Co-founder of Calcala Party

Daniel Goldstein (Hebrew: דניאל גולדשטיין) is a US-based Israeli politician. In Israel, he is known for co-founding the Calcala Party with his brother Benny Goldstein. He has also held political office in the United States.

== Early career ==
Prior to entering politics, Goldstein worked as an electrician. In 1999, he founded Daniels Electric. In 2010, Goldstein joined E&M Management, a realty company that attracted controversy for its business tactics.

== Politics ==
In 2012, Daniel Goldstein, along with his brother Benny Goldstein, founded the Calcala Party in Israel. The name translates to "Finance Party" in Hebrew. Benny Goldstein had been arrested for failure to pay child support, and the brothers reportedly founded the Calcala Party to promote the reformation of laws targeted at divorced men.

Daniel Goldstein ran for the Israeli legislative election in 2013 and 2015. In the US, he is currently serving his third term as Village Trustee of Lawrence, New York.

== See also ==
- 2013 Israeli legislative election
- 2015 Israeli legislative election
