= Aryeh Eldad =

Israeli physician and politician (born 1950)

- אריה אלדד
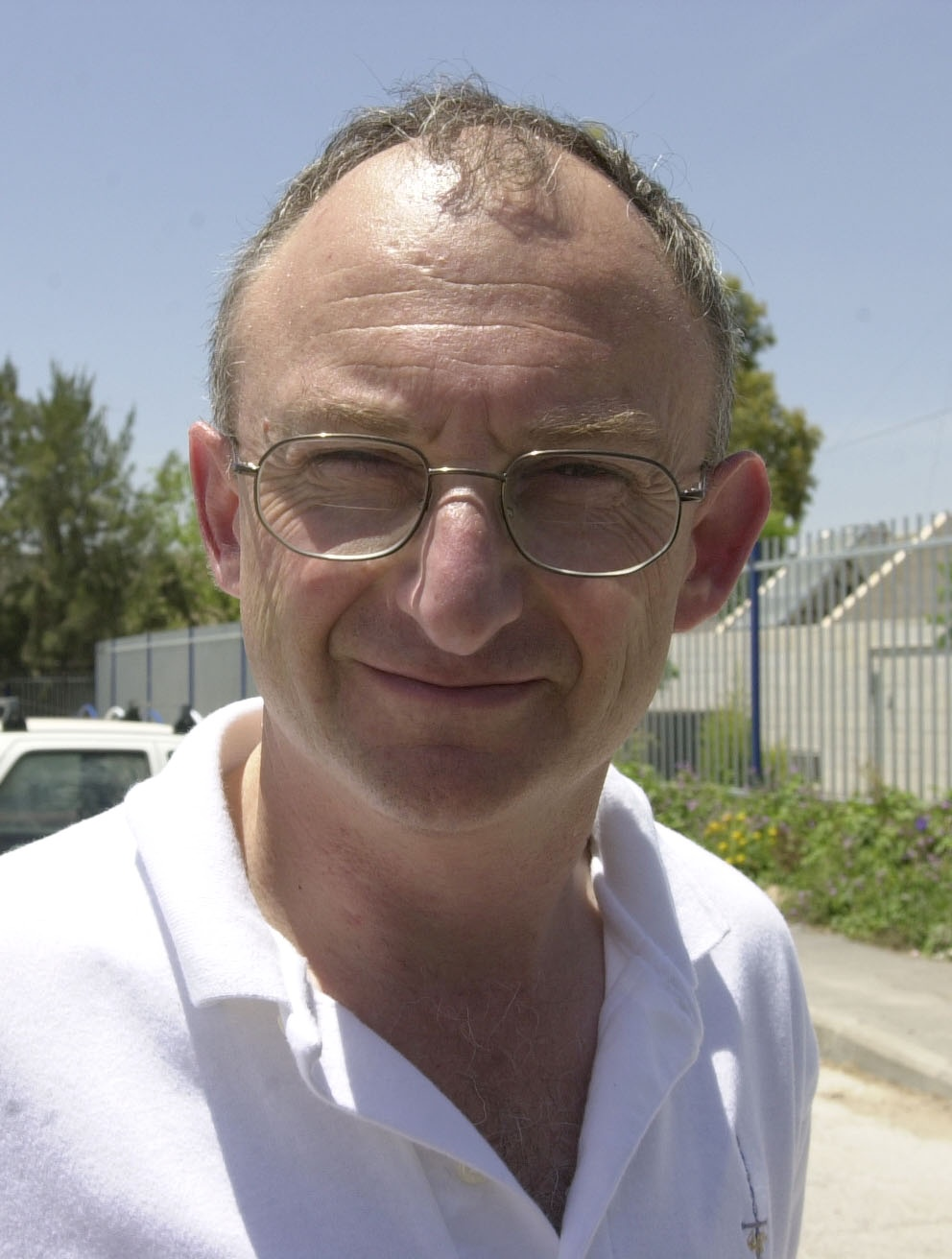
- Eldad in 2002

Faction represented in the Knesset
- 2003–2012: National Union
- 2012–2013: Otzma LeYisrael

Personal details
- Born: 1 May 1950 (age 76) Tel Aviv, Israel
- Parent: Israel Eldad (father)
- Education: Tel Aviv University

Military service
- Branch/service: Israel Defense Forces
- Rank: Tat Aluf (Brigadier General)

Aryeh Eldad (Hebrew: אריה אלדד; born 1 May 1950) is an Israeli physician, politician and former medical officer.

Born in Tel Aviv, Eldad is a professor of medicine, and was head of the plastic surgery and burns unit at the Hadassah Medical Center. He was a member of the Knesset from 2003 to 2013 for the National Union, and from 2012 for Otzma LeYisrael, which he co-founded. He was formerly a chief medical officer, and the senior commander of the Israel Defense Forces medical corps.

== Biography ==
Eldad was born in Tel Aviv on 1 May 1950. As a child, he was a voice actor in radio plays for Israeli state radio. He is married, with five children. His father, Israel Eldad, was a well-known Israeli public thinker, and formerly one of the leaders of the militant underground group Lehi. Aryeh Eldad is a resident of the Israeli settlement of Kfar Adumim, and was a Brigadier-General (reserves) in the Israel Defense Forces.

=== Medical career ===
Eldad studied medicine at Tel Aviv University, where he earned his doctorate. He served as the chief medical officer, and was the senior commander of the Israel Defense Forces medical corps for 25 years, and reached a rank of Tat Aluf (Brigadier General). He won the Evans Award from the American Burns Treatment Association for his treatment of burns. Eldad is a professor of medicine, and was head of the plastic surgery and burns unit at the Hadassah Medical Center hospital in Jerusalem.

=== Political career ===
Eldad was first elected to the Knesset on the National Union list in 2003, and chaired the Ethics Committee. Prior to the scheduled Israeli withdrawal from the Gaza Strip and the northern West Bank in August 2005, Eldad was the only member of parliament to call for non-violent civil disobedience as a tactic in the struggle against the government. Eldad even walked the few hundred kilometres between the now-evacuated community of Sa-Nur (in the northern West Bank) to Neve Dekalim (south Gaza Strip), in order to attract attention to the opposition of the Withdrawal plan.

In the February 2006 dismantlement of the Amona outpost, Eldad was injured during the confrontation between demonstrators and police, as was his ally MK Effi Eitam. The event caused a storm of criticism on both sides, as interim Prime Minister Ehud Olmert accused them of inciting the crowd to attack the police, while they accused Olmert and the police of reckless use of force.

After being re-elected in 2006, in August 2007, Eldad established and headed a 10-member Homesh First Knesset caucus met for the first time. The caucus' mandate is to work to promote the re-establishment of Homesh, with the aim of eventually re-establishing all the settlements dismantled in 2005.

In October 2007 he took part in the international counter-jihad conference in Brussels. He organised a counter-jihad conference himself titled "Facing Jihad" in Jerusalem the following year that included a screening of the film Fitna by Geert Wilders.

In November 2007, he announced the formation of a new secular right-wing party named Hatikva. Ultimately, the party ran as a faction of the National Union in the 2009 elections, with Eldad in third place on the alliance's list. He retained his seat as the Union won four mandates.

In 2008, after Meretz Chairman Yossi Beilin submitted a bill to remove the Jewish settlers from Hebron, Eldad called the proposal "racist". In protest, he submitted a "mirror image" bill to the Knesset proposing that Hebron's Arab residents be removed "in order to protect the Jews of Hebron".

Eldad's 2009 proposal that Palestinian Arabs be given Jordanian citizenship drew a formal protest from the Jordanian foreign minister.

In 2012, Eldad and Michael Ben-Ari launched a new party, Otzma LeYisrael. However, the party failed to cross the 2% threshold in the 2013 elections, and Eldad subsequently lost his Knesset seat.

In 2012, Eldad and Michael Ben-Ari sparked controversy by calling for asylum seekers entering Israel to be shot.

==== Political beliefs ====
In 2008, Eldad said he planned to introduce "anti-Islamization legislation" in the Knesset in order to "confront the enemy within and without". He would reveal details of the plan at his "Facing Jihad" conference the same month.

In response to David Miliband's statement that the Israeli cloning of British passports is "intolerable", Eldad commented in 2010: "I think the British are being hypocritical, and I do not wish to insult dogs here, since some dogs show true loyalty, [but] who gave the British the right to judge us on the war on terror?".

During Mahmoud Ahmadinejad's visit to Lebanon in October 2010, Eldad stated: "History would have been different if in 1939, some Jewish soldier had succeeded in taking Hitler out. If Ahmadinejad can be in the crosshairs of an IDF rifle when he comes to throw rocks at us, he must not return home alive."
