= Brit Olam =

Israeli political party

Brit Olam ברית עולם
- Leader: Ofer Pinhas Lifshitz; Kinneret Golan Hoz
- Chairman: Yehonatan Kasif
- Founded: 2005
- Ideology: Social justice Direct democracy (from 2015); Anti-corruption; Secularism
- Most MKs: 0

Election symbol
- ה (2005) פי (2009) נ (2013) זץ (2015)

Brit Olam (Hebrew: ברית עולם, lit. 'World Alliance' or 'Eternal Covenant') is a political party in Israel.

== Background and ideology ==
Brit Olam is a joint Jewish–Arab party founded by Ofer Lifschitz in 2005. It stands for the foundation of a Palestinian state, separation of religion and state, raising the minimum wage, and improving the education system. It also aims to improve relations between Jews and Arabs in Israel, and emphasizes the need for social justice and cohesion.

The party ran for the 2006 elections, with Lifschitz heading its list. However, they won only 2,011 votes (0.06%), failing to cross the 2% electoral threshold. For the 2009 elections, the party was headed by Kinneret Golan Hoz; it won 678 votes (0.02%) and again failed to pass the threshold. On its third attempt in the 2013 elections, the list was again headed by Lifschitz and got 761 votes (0.02%).

In the 2015 election, Brit Olam was used as a "Shelf Party" by a pro-direct democracy list named the "National Team (Temporary)".

In the April 2019 election, the Brit Olam list had Lifschitz as a lone candidate. The list won 216 votes, the fewest votes any party list has received to date in Israeli Knesset elections.

The party registered on 8 September 2026 to run in the 2026 Israeli legislative election.

== Electoral results ==
=== Knesset ===
| Election | Leader | Votes | % | Seats | +/– | Government |
|---|---|---|---|---|---|---|
| 2026 | Ofer Pinhas Lifshitz | 252 | 0.00 (#36) | 0 / 120 | New | Extra-parliamentary |
