= Leader (political party) =

Minor political party in Israel

Leader לידר
- Leader: Alexander Radko, Oleg Radko, David Belhassen
- Founded: 2003
- Ideology: Russian speakers' interests Secularism

Election symbol
- ף (2003, 2006) קץ (2009) נק (2013, 2020) ק (2019)

Leader (Hebrew: לידר, an acronym for Miflaga Mitkademet Liberalit Demokratit, Hebrew: מפלגה מתקדמת ליברלית דמוקרטית, lit. 'Progressive Liberal Democratic Party') was a minor political party in Israel. Headed by Alexander Radko, it is related to the Liberal Democratic Party of Russia.

It has run in elections in 2003, 2006, 2009 and 2013. In 2003 it received only 833 votes, the lowest of any party. In 2006 it received 580 votes, again the lowest. In 2009 it received 1,887 votes, and in 2013 it received 1,568 votes. The party skipped the next two elections, returning in the September 2019 elections led by Oleg Radko under the name "Mitkademet" (Hebrew: מתקדמת), receiving 1,033 votes. It also ran in the 2020 elections, this time led by David Belhassen who was number four on the party list in the previous elections, representing a Canaanist movement called "Hadror HaIvri", running under the name "Mitkademet (in conjunction with Hadror HaIvri movement)" (Hebrew: מתקדמת (בשיתוף עם תנועת הדרור העברי)) and receiving 622 votes.

As of 2024 it has never succeeded in passing the electoral threshold and has not received any seats.
