= HaTikva (political party) =

HaTikva התקווה
- Leader: Aryeh Eldad
- Founded: 2007
- Dissolved: 2012
- Merged into: Otzma Yehudit
- Ideology: National conservatism Greater Israel; Ultranationalism; Secularism; Economic liberalism Revisionist Zionism
- Political position: Far-right
- National affiliation: National Union (2009–2012)
- Most MKs: 1 (2009–2013)
- Fewest MKs: 1 (2009–2013)

HaTikva (Hebrew: התקווה, lit. 'The Hope') was a minor political party in Israel. A secular right-wing to far-right party, it was headed by Aryeh Eldad and was one of the factions of the National Union alliance.

Formed in late 2007, it was officially registered on 9 December 2007. Eldad stated that the party needed 5,000 members "to be legally qualified to raise up to NIS 2 million for each candidate running for party chairman".

For the 2009 elections, the party joined the National Union, with Eldad winning fourth place on the Union's list.

In 2012 HaTikva and the Jewish National Front, another member party of the National Union, announced their decision to leave the alliance and form Otzma LeYisrael.
