= Holocaust Survivors and Grown-Up Green Leaf Party =

Holocaust Survivors and Grown-Up Green Leaf Party ניצולי השואה עם בוגרי עלה ירוק
- President: Ohad Shem-Tov
- Chairman: Ya'akov Kfir
- Founded: 2009
- Merger of: Holocaust Survivors' New Zionism – Movement (in Hebrew) and former members of Ale Yarok
- Headquarters: Jerusalem
- Ideology: Holocaust Survivors (Sh'erit ha-Pletah) issues Cannabis legalization Zionism; Green liberalism Environmentalism; Human rights Harm reduction Anti-fascism
- Most MKs: 0
- Current MKs: 0

Election symbol
- יק

The Holocaust Survivors & Grown-Up Green Leaf Party (Hebrew: ניצולי השואה עם בוגרי עלה ירוק, romanized: Nitzolei HaShoah im Bogerei Aleh Yarok) was a political party in Israel, formed as an alliance of some members of Ale Yarok ("Green Leaf" in Hebrew) – a liberal political party known for its ideology of legalizing cannabis, and members of the "New Zionism" party, whose head was a Holocaust survivor and an activist for this cause. The party ran in the 2009 Knesset elections.

The party's chairman and first person on the list was Ohad Shem-Tov, former chairman of the Green Leaf party. On the second spot was Yaakov Peri, a Holocaust survivor and activist, who had founded the "New Zionism – The People's Party" in 2006 (which did not win any seats in the government in that year's general election). The alliance between the two came as a result of disagreements within the Green Leaf party, and discussions between Shem-Tov and Peri.

The unusual alliance between these parties, one focused on Holocaust issues and the other on the legalization of recreational drugs, sparked some public controversy in Israel – critics said that this pairing was inappropriate as it was disrespecting the cause of the Holocaust.

The party's platform included improving government treatment of the rights of Holocaust survivors, better health care system, environmental protection, reforms in mandatory education, animal experimentations and other social economic-related issues.

It won 2,346 votes (0.07%), well below the 2% electoral threshold.
