= Ale Yarok =

Ale Yarok עלה ירוק
- Chairperson: Oren Lebovitch
- Founder: Boaz Wachtel
- Founded: 1999
- Headquarters: Jerusalem
- Ideology: Liberalism (Israeli); Green liberalism Green Zionism; Cannabis legalization Freedom of information Harm reduction
- Slogan: "(I'm) Proud of My Choice"
- Most MKs: 0
- Current MKs: 0

Election symbol
- קנ

Party flag

Website
- aleyarok.org.il

Ale Yarok (Hebrew: עָלֶה יָרוֹק, lit. 'Green Leaf') is a liberal political party in Israel best known for its ideology of legalizing cannabis. To date, it has had no representation in the Knesset. Ale Yarok has not yet met the electoral threshold for inclusion in any of the elections that they have contested.

== History ==
Established in 1999 by Boaz Wachtel, Shlomi Sandak, and Rafik Kimchi, the party gained 1% of the vote in the elections that year, and 1.2% in the 2003 elections, but both times failed to pass the 1.5% threshold for representation in the Knesset. After these elections and despite the strong results in the 2003 elections, the chairman of Ale Yarok, Boaz Wachtel, announced that he was giving up the leadership of the party, but remained in the position due to party members requests.

Before the 2006 elections the party announced that it intended to run for a third time, despite the threshold for representation having been raised to 2%. The party competed for votes with the supporters of the Democratic Choice (which later stepped down from running in the election) and with Meretz-Yachad, which had also promised to act for the decriminalization of soft drugs; another competitor was the Green Party with a strong ecological platform. The party gained 1.3% of the vote, and came second among those parties failing to make the threshold. After the election, Wachtel passed the chairmanship to Ohad Shem-Tov.

Before the 2009 elections, Shem-Tov was expelled from the party by Shlomi Sandak who was the temporary chairman of the Green Leaf Party. Internal disputes led the party to split with Shem-Tov forming the Ale Yarok Alumni group. The Alumni party later allied with the Holocaust Survivors party to contest the 2009 Knesset elections. In this elections Ale Yarok was led by Israeli comedian Gil Kopatch.

For the 2013 elections, the party presented a broad liberal platform and ran with some members of the "New Liberal Movement" (an Israeli libertarian nonpartisan organization, also known as the Israeli Freedom Movement), under the name "Ale Yarok-The Liberal list".

Oren Lebovitch has been the chairman of the party since December 2014. Lebovitch, the editor-in-chief of the Israeli Cannabis Magazine, led the party to its highest number of voters in the March 2015 election.

The party allied with Sharren Haskel's Israel First party ahead of the 2026 Israeli legislative election.

== Ideology ==
The party's current platform is based on the legalization of the cannabis plant, marijuana and hashish, expansion of human rights, free market and institutionalization of prostitution and gambling. In official publications the movement claims that "the partition between right-wing and left-wing is anachronistic"; it believes that any proposed solution of the Israeli-Palestinian conflict must be put on referendum in order to be legitimate. It takes a left-wing stance on the Israeli–Palestinian conflict.

== Election results ==
=== Knesset ===
Election	Votes	%	Seats	+/−	Status
1999	34,029	1.00	0 / 120	New	Extra-parliamentary
2003	37,855	1.20	0 / 120	0	Extra-parliamentary
2006	40,353	1.29	0 / 120	0	Extra-parliamentary
2009	13,132	0.39	0 / 120	0	Extra-parliamentary
2013	43,734	1.15	0 / 120	0	Extra-parliamentary
2015	47,157	1.12	0 / 120	0	Extra-parliamentary
Apr 2019	Did not contest		0 / 120	0	Extra-parliamentary
Sept 2019	Did not contest		0 / 120	0	Extra-parliamentary
2020	Did not contest		0 / 120	0	Extra-parliamentary
2021	Did not contest		0 / 120	0	Extra-parliamentary
2022	part of Islamic Family		0 / 120	0	Extra-parliamentary
2026	with Israel First		0 / 120	0	Extra-parliamentary

== See also ==
- Cannabis in Israel
- Cannabis: Legal issues
- Drug liberalization
- Drug policy reform
- Marijuana parties
- Politics of Israel
