= Party lists for the 2009 Israeli legislative election =

The 2009 Israeli legislative election was held using closed list proportional representation. Each party presented a list of candidates to the Central Elections Committee prior to the election.

== Balad ==
The Balad list includes:

1. Jamal Zahalka
2. Said Nafa
3. Haneen Zoabi
4. Abbas Zakour
5. Oonie Tuma

== Hadash ==
The Hadash list includes:

1. Mohammad Barakeh
2. Hana Sweid
3. Dov Khenin
4. Afu Agbaria
5. Aida Touma-Suleiman

== The Jewish Home ==
The Jewish Home list includes:

1. Daniel Hershkowitz
2. Zevulun Orlev
3. Uri Orbach
4. Nissan Slomiansky
5. Sar Shalom Gerbi

== Kadima ==
The Kadima list includes:

1. Tzipi Livni
2. Shaul Mofaz
3. Dalia Itzik
4. Tzachi Hanegbi
5. Roni Bar-On
6. Ze'ev Boim
7. Meir Sheetrit
8. Ruhama Avraham
9. Avi Dichter
10. Marina Solodkin
11. Yoel Hasson
12. Gideon Ezra
13. Yaakov Edri
14. Eli Aflalo
15. Ze'ev Bielski
16. Ronit Tirosh
17. Haim Ramon
18. Nachman Shai
19. Shlomo Molla
20. Robert Tiviaev
21. Majalli Wahabi
22. Rachel Adato
23. Yohanan Plesner
24. Shai Hermesh
25. Yisrael Hasson
26. Aryeh Bibi
27. Otniel Schneller
28. Orit Zuaretz
29. Yulia Shamalov-Berkovich
30. Nino Abesadze
31. Avner Barazani
32. Doron Avital
33. Avi Duan
34. Yuval Zellner
35. Akram Hasson
36. Ahmed Dabbah
37. David Tal
38. Dimitri Rusinski
39. Aharon Ben Hamo
40. Eitan Shalom

== Labor ==
The Labor list includes:

1. Ehud Barak
2. Isaac Herzog
3. Ophir Pines-Paz
4. Avishay Braverman
5. Shelly Yachimovich
6. Matan Vilnai
7. Eitan Cabel
8. Binyamin Ben-Eliezer
9. Yuli Tamir
10. Amir Peretz
11. Daniel Ben-Simon
12. Shalom Simhon
13. Orit Noked
14. Einat Wilf
15. Raleb Majadele
16. Shachiv Shnaan
17. Yoram Marciano
18. Leon Litinetsky
19. Colette Avital
20. Moshe Samia
21. Yosef Sulimani
22. Arik Hadad

== Likud ==
The Likud list includes:

1. Benjamin Netanyahu
2. Gideon Sa'ar
3. Gilad Erdan
4. Reuven Rivlin
5. Benny Begin
6. Moshe Kahlon
7. Silvan Shalom
8. Moshe Ya'alon
9. Yuval Steinitz
10. Lea Nass
11. Israel Katz
12. Yuli Edelstein
13. Limor Livnat
14. Haim Katz
15. Yossi Peled
16. Michael Eitan
17. Dan Meridor
18. Tzipi Hotovely
19. Gila Gamliel
20. Ze'ev Elkin
21. Yariv Levin
22. Zion Pinyan
23. Ayoob Kara
24. Danny Danon
25. Carmel Shama
26. Ofir Akunis
27. Miri Regev
28. Alali Adamso
29. Itzik Danino
30. David Even Tzur
31. Keti Shitrit
32. Keren Barak

== National Union ==
The National Union list includes:

1. Ya'akov Katz
2. Uri Ariel
3. Aryeh Eldad
4. Michael Ben-Ari
5. Uri Bank
6. Alon Davidi

== New Movement-Meretz ==
The New Movement-Meretz list includes:

1. Haim Oron
2. Ilan Gilon
3. Nitzan Horowitz
4. Zahava Gal-On
5. Mossi Raz
6. Avshalom Vilan

== Ra'am-Ta'al ==
The Ra'am-Ta'al list includes:

1. Ibrahim Sarsur
2. Ahmad Tibi
3. Taleb el-Sana
4. Masud Ghnaim
5. Talab Abu Arar

== Shas ==
The Shas list includes:

1. Eli Yishai
2. Ariel Atias
3. Yitzhak Cohen
4. Amnon Cohen
5. Meshulam Nahari
6. Ya'akov Margi
7. David Azulai
8. Yitzhak Vaknin
9. Nissim Ze'ev
10. Haim Amsalem
11. Avraham Michaeli
12. Mazor Bahaina
13. Rafael Cohen

== United Torah Judaism ==
The United Torah Judaism list includes:

1. Yaakov Litzman
2. Moshe Gafni
3. Meir Porush
4. Uri Maklev
5. Eliezer Moses
6. Yisrael Eichler
7. Menachem Carmel
8. Yaakov Gutterman

== Yisrael Beiteinu ==
The Yisrael Beiteinu list includes:

1. Avigdor Lieberman
2. Uzi Landau
3. Stas Misezhnikov
4. Yitzhak Aharonovich
5. Sofa Landver
6. Orly Levy
7. Danny Ayalon
8. David Rotem
9. Anastassia Michaeli
10. Faina Kirschenbaum
11. Robert Ilatov
12. Hamad Amar
13. Moshe Matalon
14. Lia Shemtov
15. Alex Miller
16. Yitzhak Slavin
