= List of members of the eighteenth Knesset =

18th Knesset
| ← | 17th | 19th | → |

Overview
- Legislative body: Knesset
- Jurisdiction: Israel
- Meeting place: Knesset building
- Term: 24 February 2009 – 16 October 2012
- Election: 10 February 2009
- Government: 32nd government

Knesset
- President: Shimon Peres
- Prime minister: Benjamin Netanyahu
- Speaker: Reuven Rivlin

The following is a list of the members of the 18th Knesset, elected on 10 February 2009.

== Knesset members ==
| Party | Name | Notes |
|---|---|---|
| Kadima (28) | Shaul Mofaz | Leader of the Opposition |
| Kadima (28) | Dalia Itzik | |
| Kadima (28) | Roni Bar-On | |
| Kadima (28) | Meir Sheetrit | |
| Kadima (28) | Ruhama Avraham | |
| Kadima (28) | Marina Solodkin | |
| Kadima (28) | Yoel Hasson | |
| Kadima (28) | Yaakov Edri | |
| Kadima (28) | Ze'ev Bielski | |
| Kadima (28) | Ronit Tirosh | |
| Kadima (28) | Nahman Shai | |
| Kadima (28) | Shlomo Molla | |
| Kadima (28) | Robert Tiviaev | |
| Kadima (28) | Majalli Wahabi | |
| Kadima (28) | Rachel Adato | |
| Kadima (28) | Yohanan Plesner | |
| Kadima (28) | Shai Hermesh | |
| Kadima (28) | Yisrael Hasson | |
| Kadima (28) | Aryeh Bibi | |
| Kadima (28) | Otniel Schneller | |
| Kadima (28) | Orit Zuaretz | |
| Kadima (28) | Yulia Shamalov-Berkovich | |
| Kadima (28) | Nino Abesadze | |
| Kadima (28) | Doron Avital | |
| Kadima (28) | Avi Duan | |
| Kadima (28) | Yuval Tzelner | |
| Kadima (28) | Akram Hasoon | |
| Kadima (28) | Ahmed Dabbah | |
| Likud (27) | Benjamin Netanyahu | Prime Minister |
| Likud (27) | Gideon Sa'ar | Education Minister |
| Likud (27) | Gilad Erdan | Environmental Protection Minister; Prime Minister's Liaison to the Knesset |
| Likud (27) | Reuven Rivlin | Speaker of the Knesset |
| Likud (27) | Benny Begin | Minister without Portfolio |
| Likud (27) | Moshe Kahlon | Communications Minister |
| Likud (27) | Silvan Shalom | Vice Prime Minister; Regional Development Minister |
| Likud (27) | Moshe Ya'alon | Vice Prime Minister; Strategic Affairs Minister |
| Likud (27) | Yuval Steinitz | Finance Minister |
| Likud (27) | Lea Nass | Deputy Minister of Pensioner Affairs |
| Likud (27) | Yisrael Katz | Transportation Minister |
| Likud (27) | Yuli-Yoel Edelstein | Information and Diaspora Minister |
| Likud (27) | Limor Livnat | Culture and Sport Minister |
| Likud (27) | Haim Katz | |
| Likud (27) | Michael Eitan | Improvement of Government Services Minister |
| Likud (27) | Dan Meridor | Deputy Prime Minister; Minister of Intelligence and Atomic Energy |
| Likud (27) | Tzipi Hotovely | |
| Likud (27) | Gila Gamliel | Deputy Minister in the Prime Minister's Office |
| Likud (27) | Ze'ev Elkin | |
| Likud (27) | Yariv Levin | |
| Likud (27) | Zion Pinyan | |
| Likud (27) | Ayoob Kara | Deputy Development of the Negev and Galilee Minister |
| Likud (27) | Danny Danon | |
| Likud (27) | Carmel Shama | |
| Likud (27) | Ofir Akunis | |
| Likud (27) | Miri Regev | |
| Likud (27) | Alali Adamso | |
| Yisrael Beiteinu (15) | Avigdor Liberman | Foreign Affairs Minister |
| Yisrael Beiteinu (15) | Uzi Landau | National Infrastructure Minister |
| Yisrael Beiteinu (15) | Stas Misezhnikov | Tourism Minister |
| Yisrael Beiteinu (15) | Yitzhak Aharonovich | Internal Security Minister |
| Yisrael Beiteinu (15) | Sofa Landver | Immigrant Absorption Minister |
| Yisrael Beiteinu (15) | Orly Levy | |
| Yisrael Beiteinu (15) | Danny Ayalon | Deputy Foreign Affairs Minister |
| Yisrael Beiteinu (15) | David Rotem | |
| Yisrael Beiteinu (15) | Anastasia Michaeli | |
| Yisrael Beiteinu (15) | Faina Kirschenbaum | |
| Yisrael Beiteinu (15) | Robert Ilatov | |
| Yisrael Beiteinu (15) | Hamad Amar | |
| Yisrael Beiteinu (15) | Moshe Mutz Matlon | |
| Yisrael Beiteinu (15) | Lia Shemtov | |
| Yisrael Beiteinu (15) | Alex Miller | |
| Shas (11) | Eli Yishai | Deputy Prime Minister; Minister of Internal Affairs |
| Shas (11) | Ariel Atias | Minister of Housing and Construction |
| Shas (11) | Yitzhak Cohen | Deputy Minister of Finance |
| Shas (11) | Amnon Cohen | |
| Shas (11) | Meshulam Nahari | Minister without Portfolio |
| Shas (11) | Ya'akov Margi | Minister of Religious Services |
| Shas (11) | David Azulai | |
| Shas (11) | Yitzhak Vaknin | |
| Shas (11) | Nissim Ze'ev | |
| Shas (11) | Avraham Michaeli | |
| Shas (11) | Haim Amsalem | Left party to sit as an independent |
| Labor Party (8) | Shelly Yachimovich | Briefly Leader of the Opposition |
| Labor Party (8) | Isaac Herzog | |
| Labor Party (8) | Avishay Braverman | |
| Labor Party (8) | Eitan Cabel | |
| Labor Party (8) | Binyamin Ben-Eliezer | |
| Labor Party (8) | Daniel Ben-Simon | |
| Labor Party (8) | Raleb Majadele | |
| Labor Party (8) | Yoram Marciano | |
| Independence (5) | Ehud Barak | Defense Minister |
| Independence (5) | Matan Vilnai | Deputy Defense Minister |
| Independence (5) | Shalom Simhon | Minister of Agriculture |
| Independence (5) | Orit Noked | Deputy Minister of Industry, Trade and Labour |
| Independence (5) | Einat Wilf | |
| United Torah Judaism (5) | Yaakov Litzman | Deputy Minister of Health |
| United Torah Judaism (5) | Moshe Gafni | |
| United Torah Judaism (5) | Uri Maklev | |
| United Torah Judaism (5) | Eliezer Moses | Deputy Minister of Education |
| United Torah Judaism (5) | Yisrael Eichler | |
| National Union (4) | Ya'akov Katz | |
| National Union (4) | Uri Ariel | |
| National Union (4) | Aryeh Eldad | |
| National Union (4) | Michael Ben-Ari | |
| Hadash (4) | Mohammad Barakeh | |
| Hadash (4) | Hana Sweid | |
| Hadash (4) | Dov Khenin | |
| Hadash (4) | Afu Agbaria | |
| United Arab List–Ta'al (4) | Ibrahim Sarsur | |
| United Arab List–Ta'al (4) | Taleb el-Sana | |
| United Arab List–Ta'al (4) | Masud Ghnaim | |
| United Arab List–Ta'al (4) | Ahmad Tibi | Deputy Speaker |
| The Jewish Home (3) | Daniel Hershkowitz | Minister of Science and Technology |
| The Jewish Home (3) | Zevulun Orlev | |
| The Jewish Home (3) | Uri Orbach | |
| New Movement – Meretz (3) | Ilan Gilon | |
| New Movement – Meretz (3) | Nitzan Horowitz | |
| New Movement – Meretz (3) | Zehava Gal-On | |
| Balad (3) | Jamal Zahalka | |
| Balad (3) | Said Nafa | |
| Balad (3) | Haneen Zoabi | |

== Replacements ==
| MK | Party | Replaced | Date | Notes |
|---|---|---|---|---|
| Yulia Shamalov-Berkovich | Kadima | Haim Ramon | 2 July 2009 | Ramon retired from politics to go into business |
| Einat Wilf | Labor Party | Ophir Pines-Paz | 10 January 2010 | Pines-Paz retired from politics |
| Raleb Majadele | Labor Party | Yuli Tamir | 13 April 2010 | Tamir retired from politics |
| Nino Abesadze | Kadima | Tzachi Hanegbi | 9 November 2010 | Hanegbi suspended following indictment |
| Yisrael Eichler | United Torah Judaism | Meir Porush | 6 February 2011 | Porush resigned as part of a seat rotation agreement. |
| Shachiv Shnaan | Labor Party | Matan Vilnai | 14 February 2012 | Vilnai resigned to become ambassador. |
| Doron Avital | Kadima | Ze'ev Boim | 18 March 2011 | Death of Boim |
| Zehava Gal-On | New Movement – Meretz | Haim Oron | 25 March 2011 | Oron resigned his seat |
| Avi Duan | Kadima | Eli Aflalo | 25 January 2012 | Aflalo resigned his seat |
| Yuval Tzelner | Kadima | Tzipi Livni | 3 May 2012 | Livni resigned her seat |
| Akram Hasoon | Kadima | Gideon Ezra | 17 May 2012 | Ezra died of cancer |
| Ahmed Dabbah | Kadima | Avi Dichter | 16 August 2012 | Dichter resigned to become a government minister |
| Alali Adamso | Likud | Yossi Peled | 16 September 2012 | Peled resigned his seat |
| Yoram Marciano | Labor Party | Amir Peretz | 9 December 2012 | Peretz resigned after he left the Labor Party to join Hatnuah |

== See also ==
- List of Likud Knesset members
- Arab members of the Knesset
