= 2012 Kadima leadership election =

- February 27, 2012
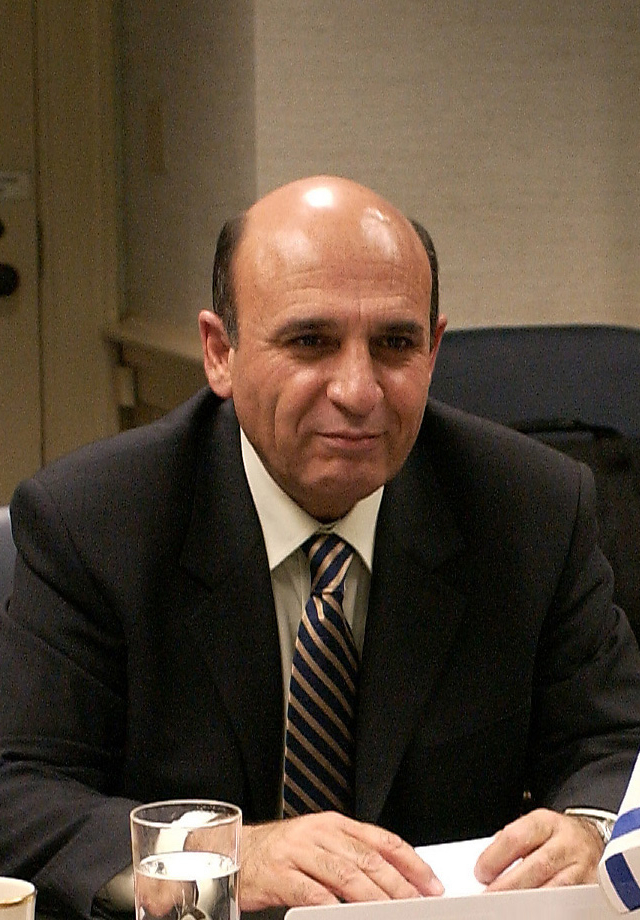

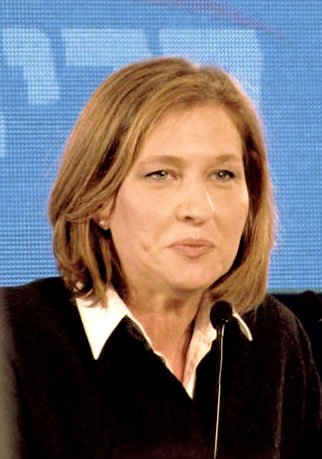
Candidate	Shaul Mofaz	Tzipi Livni
Party	Kadima	Kadima
Popular vote	23,987	14,516
Percentage	62.3%	37.7%
Kadima leader before election
Tzipi Livni
Kadima leader
Shaul Mofaz

An election for the leadership of Kadima was held on 27 March 2012, pitting Tzipi Livni against Shaul Mofaz. Mofaz won with 62% of the vote.

== Background ==
In November 2011, the three candidates opposed to Tzipi Livni in 2008 called for a primary to be held as soon as possible, citing the probability of Knesset elections soon. Livni said that candidates were welcome to bring up the issue at a party meeting. Livni said in an interview that she was not interested in politics. Prior opponent Avi Dichter responded that her statement was insulting to party members. Another Kadima MK called the remarks "the opposite of prime ministerial." Livni said that candidates were welcome to bring up the issue at a party meeting. However, at the meeting Livni maneuvered to delay the primary for several months. Finally, on 19 January 2012, Livni set the primary date for 27 March 2012. A Haaretz article stated that the campaign will likely involve mudslinging and personal attacks that could further damage the party's standing.

== Campaign ==
At a campaign rally, Livni was confident and said that Kadima under her leadership was best poised to defeat the incumbent Likud under Benjamin Netanyahu. Mofaz countered that Livni was weak and he would be better able to oppose Moshe Feiglin's influence in Knesset. Dichter said that Livni has harmed the party and a new leader is needed. An 18 January Maagar poll supported Livni's claim with Kadima winning four more seats under Livni than Mofaz. However, neither could take the party to victory. Former prime minister and Kadima leader Ehud Olmert declined to endorse any candidate.

At a press conference, Mofaz said his first priority will be to ensure there is "one law for everyone". He lowered his criticism of his opponent and said he would offer her a position if he was prime minister. Citing his four decades of military service and participation in four wars, he said that he would "make the utmost effort to achieve peace with [Israel's] neighbors". He also said that non-participation in the military service was a growing problem and that Israel must reform its system of governance. Previously in support of unity, Mofaz declined to join a Netanyahu government. He was confident that he could change the course of Kadima and take it to victory.

Livni picked up the endorsements of 12 MKs and two party functionaries, while Mofaz received endorsements of 10 MKs. At meeting to support Mofaz, one MK said that Mofaz is "a new candidate who can bring new audiences" and compared him to new Labor Party leader Shelly Yachimovich, who gained the national polls once she had settled in as party leader. Both candidates have significant support, leading to some speculation that the party may split after the primary. However, Livni backers were confident that she will win and mocked the support for Mofaz as "[going] shopping". They also claimed that a vote for Mofaz is a vote for a split. Livni reiterated this claim in an interview with Haaretz and admitted mistakes with handling the party several years ago.

Mofaz supporters accused Livni of encouraging Bat Yam mayor Shlomo Lahiani to join the race in order to split the Sefardi vote. Livni denied the accusation. Lahiani said his family did not want him to run, but he wanted to change the priorities of Israel. He was confident that he could beat Mofaz and Livni, and even take Kadima to victory over Likud. However, Lahiani ultimately decided not to run.

Originally rejecting calls for him to withdraw from the race, Dichter dropped out five days prior to the primary, and endorsed Mofaz.

== Candidates ==
Declared

- Tzipi Livni, party leader
- Shaul Mofaz, former Chief of Staff of the IDF

Declined or Withdrawn

- Avi Dichter, former Internal Security Minister
- Shlomo Lahiani, mayor of Bat Yam
- Meir Sheetrit, former Minister of the Interior

== Polling ==
Poll	Date	Livni	Mofaz	Dichter	Sheetrit	Don't know/Other
Goldberg-Anaby (Note: The first poll is of Kadima voters. The second poll is of likely primary voters.)	March 2012	46%	37%	9%	-	8%
Goldberg-Anaby	March 2012	51%	38%	3%	-	8%
Dichter	March 2012	36%	25%	11%	-	28%
Kadima	February 2012	55%	13%		-	42%
Maagar	18 January 2012	24%	15%	9%	2%	46%

== Endorsements ==
List of Tzipi Livni endorsements

Members of Knesset (12 of 28)

- Nino Abesadze
- Rachel Adatto
- Doron Avital
- Roni Bar-On
- Gideon Ezra
- Yoel Hasson
- Shlomo Molla
- Nachman Shai
- Marina Solodkin
- Robert Tiviaev
- Majalli Wahabi
- Orit Zuaretz

Kadima leaders

- Tzachi Hanegbi, party affairs committee head and former Member of Knesset
- Haim Ramon, Kadima council chair and former Member of Knesset
List of Shaul Mofaz endorsements

Members of Knesset (11 of 28)

- Ruhama Avraham
- Aryeh Bibi
- Ze'ev Bielski
- Avi Dichter, withdrawn candidate
- Avi Duan
- Yisrael Hasson
- Shai Hermesh
- Yohanan Plesner (formerly for Livni)
- Ronit Tirosh
- Otniel Schneller
- Yulia Shamalov-Berkovich

== Results ==
Polls closed at 22:00, but results were not in until 01:00 the next day. Mofaz defeated Livni 62.3% to 37.7%, but invited her to remain in the party in his victory speech. Livni called Mofaz to congratulate him and thanked her supporters in a concession speech.

Likud MK Ofir Akunis wished Mofaz a long career as opposition leader and said Kadima was "at the end of its journey". Fellow Likud MK Danny Danon criticized the "left-wing" views of Mofaz, such as his plan to return the borders of Israel to the Green Line. Meretz leader Zehava Gal-On also congratulated Mofaz, but said his victory proves Kadima is a "centre-right" party. Labor leader Shelly Yachimovich also congratulated Mofaz, said he was worthy of the job, and said Labor was the only true opposition party. United Torah Judaism MK Moshe Gafni blamed Livni's loss on her criticism of Haredi Jews, while National Union MK Michael Ben-Ari said Mofaz can credit his victory to Arab voters and that he was now indebted to them.

Kadima leadership election, 2012
Candidate	Votes	Percentage	Swing	±%
Shaul Mofaz	23,987	62.3%	+7,482	+20.3
Tzipi Livni (i)	14,516	37.7%	-2,420	-5.4
Turnout	38,503	40%	-828	

== See also ==
- 2008 Kadima leadership election
- 2012 Likud leadership election
