= Moshe Matalon =

Moshe Matalon may refer to:

- Moshe Matalon (politician)
- Moshe Matalon (engineer)
