= Avi Duan =

Israeli politician (1955–2018)

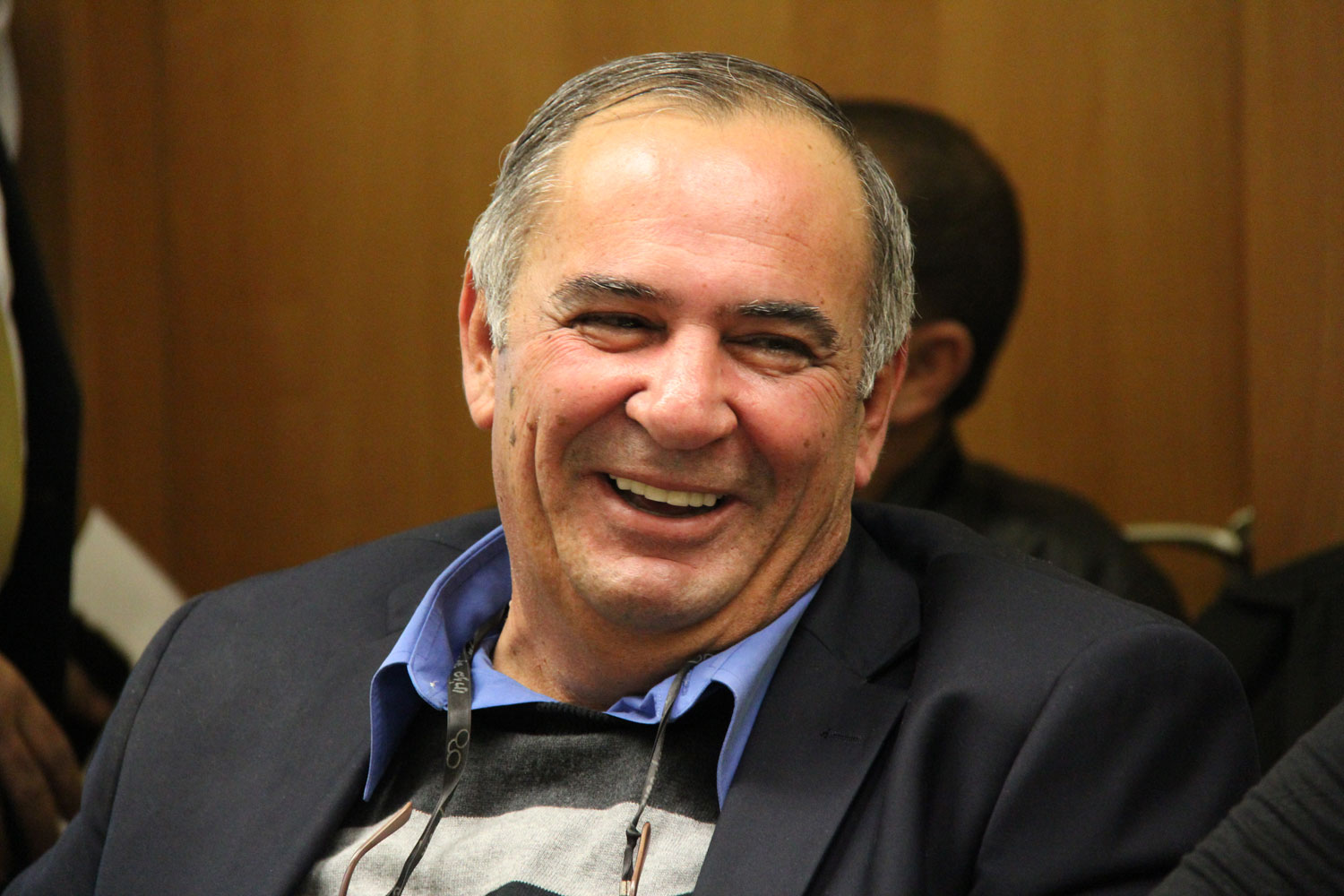
- Duan in 2012

Faction represented in the Knesset
- 2012–2013: Kadima

Personal details
- Born: 17 October 1955 Israel
- Died: 22 September 2018 (aged 62)

Avraham "Avi" Duan (Hebrew: אברהם "אבי" דואן; 17 October 1955 – 22 September 2018) was an Israeli politician who served as a member of the Knesset for Kadima between 2012 and 2013.

== Biography ==
Duan grew up in the Ramat Amidar neighbourhood of Ramat Gan and studied for a master's degree in social work and community administration at Bar Ilan University. He worked as a social worker at the American Jewish Joint Distribution Committee and ran centres for occupational development for Ethiopian immigrants in Ashdod and Rehovot.

In 2008, he led Shaul Mofaz's campaign in the Kadima leadership election. He was placed 33rd on the Kadima list for the 2009 Knesset elections. After failing to enter the Knesset as the party won 28 seats, he worked as a political advisor to Yulia Shamalov-Berkovich. On 25 January 2012 he entered the Knesset as a replacement for Eli Aflalo, who resigned after becoming co-chairman of the Jewish National Fund. Duan also acted as Mofaz's campaign manager for the 2012 Kadima leadership election.

He lost his seat in the 2013 elections. He died on 22 September 2018.
