= Operation Gown =

1973 battle of the Yom Kippur War

- Part of the Yom Kippur War
Date	October 12, 1973
Location	Al-Qutayfah, Syria
Result	Israeli victory

Belligerents
Israel	Syria

Commanders and leaders
Major Shaul Mofaz	Unknown

Strength
Sayeret Tzanhanim	Syrian infantry forces

Casualties and losses
None	Bridge destroyed, a number of tank transporters destroyed, several Syrian soldiers killed.

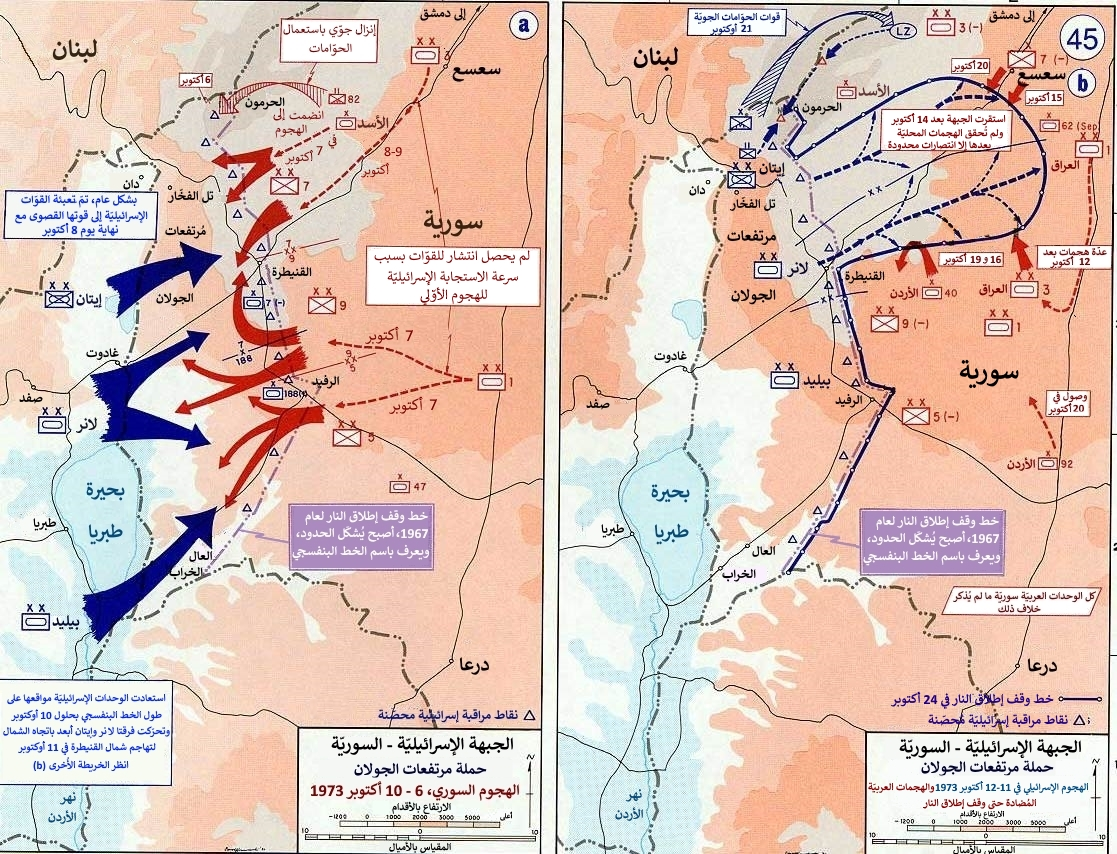
Yom Kippur War 1973 on the Golan heights

Operation Gown (Hebrew: כתונת, Ketonet), was a military operation conducted deep inside Syria by Sayeret Tzanhanim, the reconnaissance platoon of the Israeli Defense Forces' Paratroopers Brigade. It took place on October 12, 1973, during the Yom Kippur War. The paratroopers destroyed a bridge in the tri-border area of Iraq, Syria and Jordan, thereby disrupting the transfer of weapons and military forces between Syria and its allies.
