= Zion Pinyan =

Israeli politician

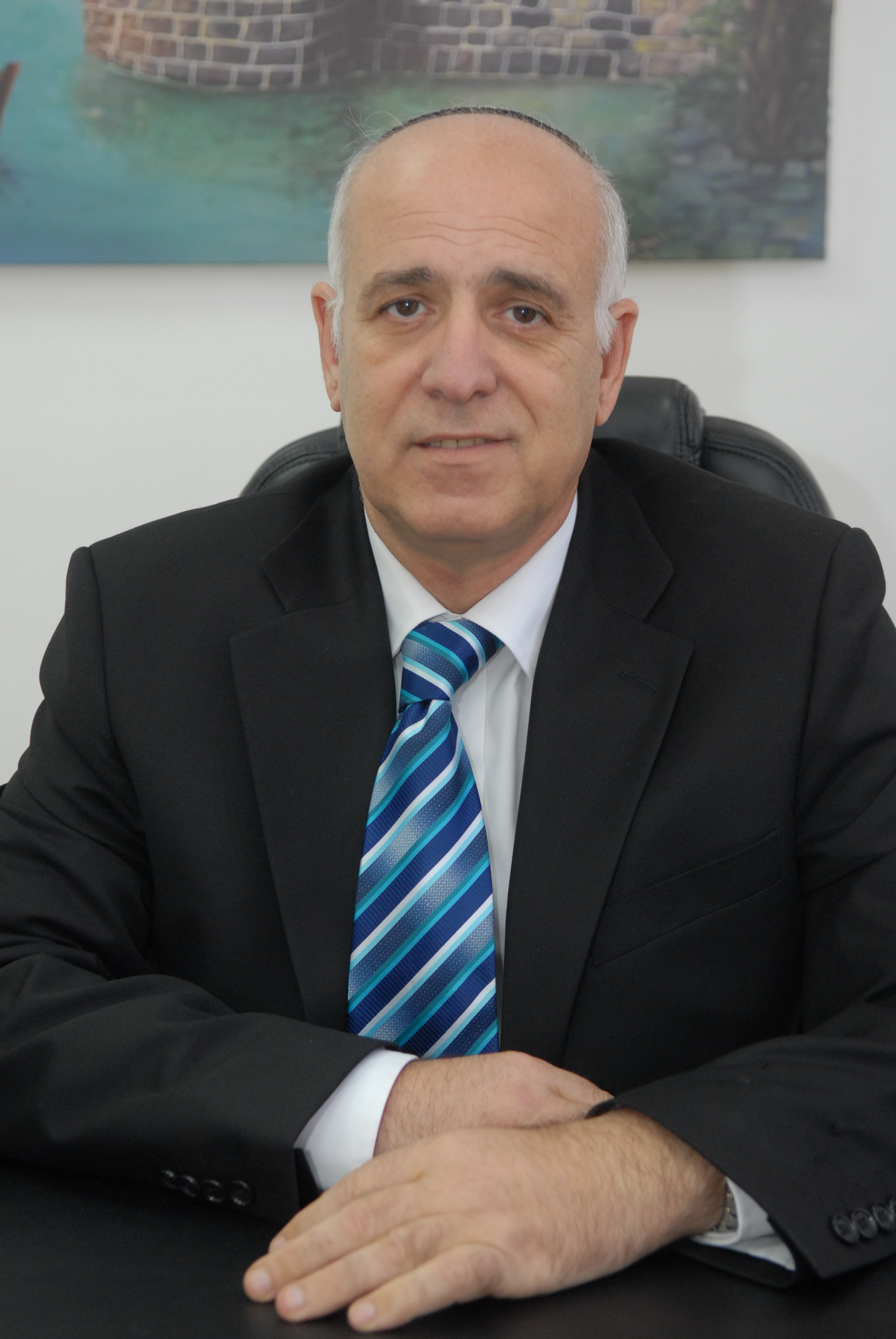

Faction represented in the Knesset
- 2009–2013: Likud

Personal details
- Born: 1951 (age 74–75) Morocco

Zion Pinyan (Hebrew: ציון פיניאן; born 1951) is an Israeli politician who served as a member of the Knesset for Likud between 2009 and 2013.

== Biography ==
Born in Morocco, Pinyan made aliyah to Israel in 1956. He trained to be a Hebrew and Maths teacher, and worked in education, eventually becoming principal of Tiberias High School. He has also lectured in mathematics at Ohalo College.

He served as a member of the city's local council for twenty years, of which fifteen (1989 to 1994) was spent as deputy mayor. He chaired the committee for Planning and Construction of Tiberias and its Environs and served as a director of the neighborhood restoration project in Tiberias and the Galilee, as well as chairing the Tiberias community centers.

Prior to the 2006 Knesset elections he was placed twenty-fourth on the Likud list, but missed out on a seat as the party won only 12 seats. For the 2009 elections he won twenty-second place on the Likud list, and entered the Knesset as the party won 27 seats.

For the 2013 elections Pinyan was placed 65th on the joint Likud Yisrael Beiteinu list, losing his seat as the alliance won only 31 seats.

Pinyan currently lives in Tiberias and is married with six children.
