= Eli Aflalo =

Israeli politician

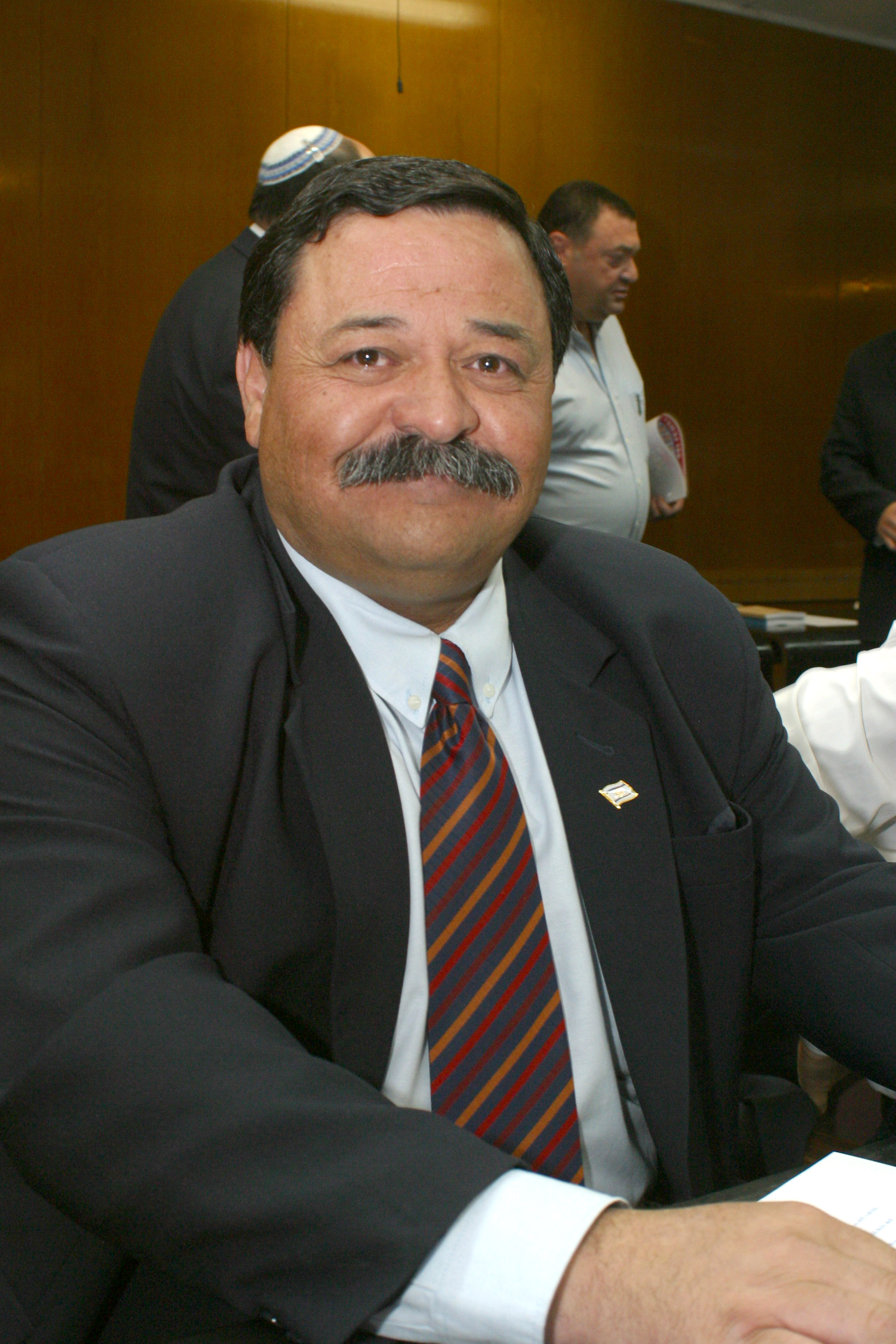

Ministerial roles
- 2008–2009: Minister of Immigrant Absorption

Faction represented in the Knesset
- 2003–2005: Likud
- 2005–2012: Kadima

Personal details
- Born: 8 September 1952 (age 73) Casablanca, Morocco

Eli Albert Aflalo (Hebrew: אלי אפללו; born 8 September 1952) is an Israeli politician who served as a member of the Knesset for Kadima and Likud from 2003 until 2012. Between July 2008 and March 2009, he was the country's Minister of Immigrant Absorption.

== Biography ==
Aflalo was born in Casablanca, Morocco in 1952 and made aliyah to Israel in 1962. He completed his army service with the rank of staff sergeant.

He was first elected to the Knesset on the Likud list in 2003, and on 30 March 2005 was appointed as Deputy Minister of Industry, Trade, and Labour.

Towards the end of his first term he defected to the new Kadima party, and was re-elected on its list. On 14 July 2008 he was appointed Minister of Immigrant Absorption. He retained his seat again in the 2009 elections after being placed 14th on the Forward list. He left the Knesset to become co-chairman of the Jewish National Fund and was replaced by Avi Duan.

He has three children and currently resides in Afula.
