= Lia Shemtov =

Israeli politician (born 1958)

- ליה שמטוב
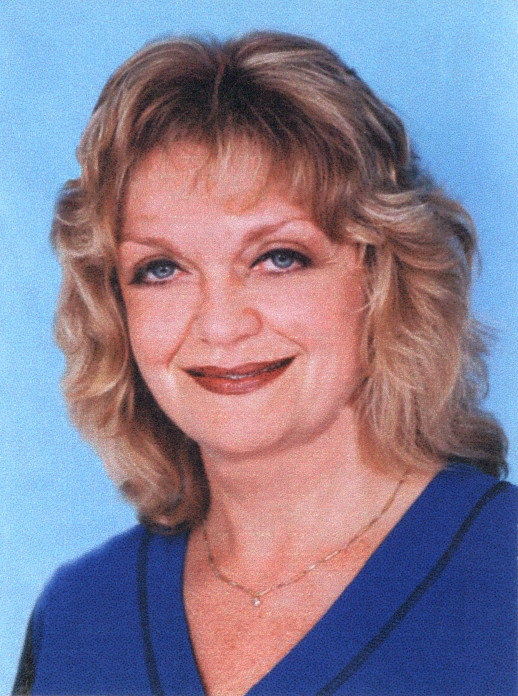
- Shemtov during her time in the Knesset

Faction represented in the Knesset
- 2006–2013: Yisrael Beiteinu

Personal details
- Born: 25 May 1958 (age 67); Chernivtsi, Soviet Union

Lia Shemtov (Hebrew: ליה שמטוב; born 25 May 1958) is an Israeli politician who currently serves as a member of Nazareth Illit City Council. She was a member of the Knesset for Yisrael Beiteinu between 2006 and 2013.

== Biography ==
Born in Chernivtsi in the Ukrainian SSR, Shemtov studied electronics engineering at Chernivtsi University before emigrating to Israel in 1980. Between 1990 and 2003 she worked for Amidar. In 1998 she was elected onto Nazareth Illit City Council, and in 2003 became its deputy mayor.

For the 2006 Knesset elections she was placed eleventh on the Yisrael Beiteinu list, and became a Knesset member when the party won 11 seats. During her first term she chaired the committee on the status of women. She retained her seat in the 2009 elections after being placed fourteenth on the party's list. For the 2013 elections she was placed 49th on the joint Likud Yisrael Beiteinu list, losing her seat as the alliance won only 31 seats.

In 2013 she was elected back onto Nazareth Illit City Council.

Shemtov currently lives in Nazareth Illit and is married with two children.
