= Alali Adamso =

Israeli politician

Faction represented in the Knesset
- 2012–2013: Likud

Personal details
- Born: 27 January 1962 (age 63) Ethiopia

Alali Adamso (Hebrew: אללי אדמסו, Amharic: አለልኝ አድማሱ; born 27 January 1962) is an Israeli politician who served as a member of the Knesset for Likud from 2012 to 2013.

== Biography ==
Adamso was born in Ethiopia and emigrated to Israel in 1983. He studied at Tel Aviv University, earning a BA in Economics and Political Science and a BA in Public Policy. After completing his national service, he worked in the United States before returning to Israel to work at the Industry, Trade and Labor Ministry.

In 1990 he joined the Likud party, and became a member of its central committee in 1999. He was placed 28th on the party's list for the 2009 elections, but missed out as the party won only 27 seats. However, he entered the Knesset on 16 September 2012 as a replacement for Yossi Peled. Prior to the 2013 elections he was placed 71st on the joint Likud Yisrael Beiteinu list, losing his seat as the alliance won only 31 seats.
