= Lea Nass =

Israeli politician (born 1961)

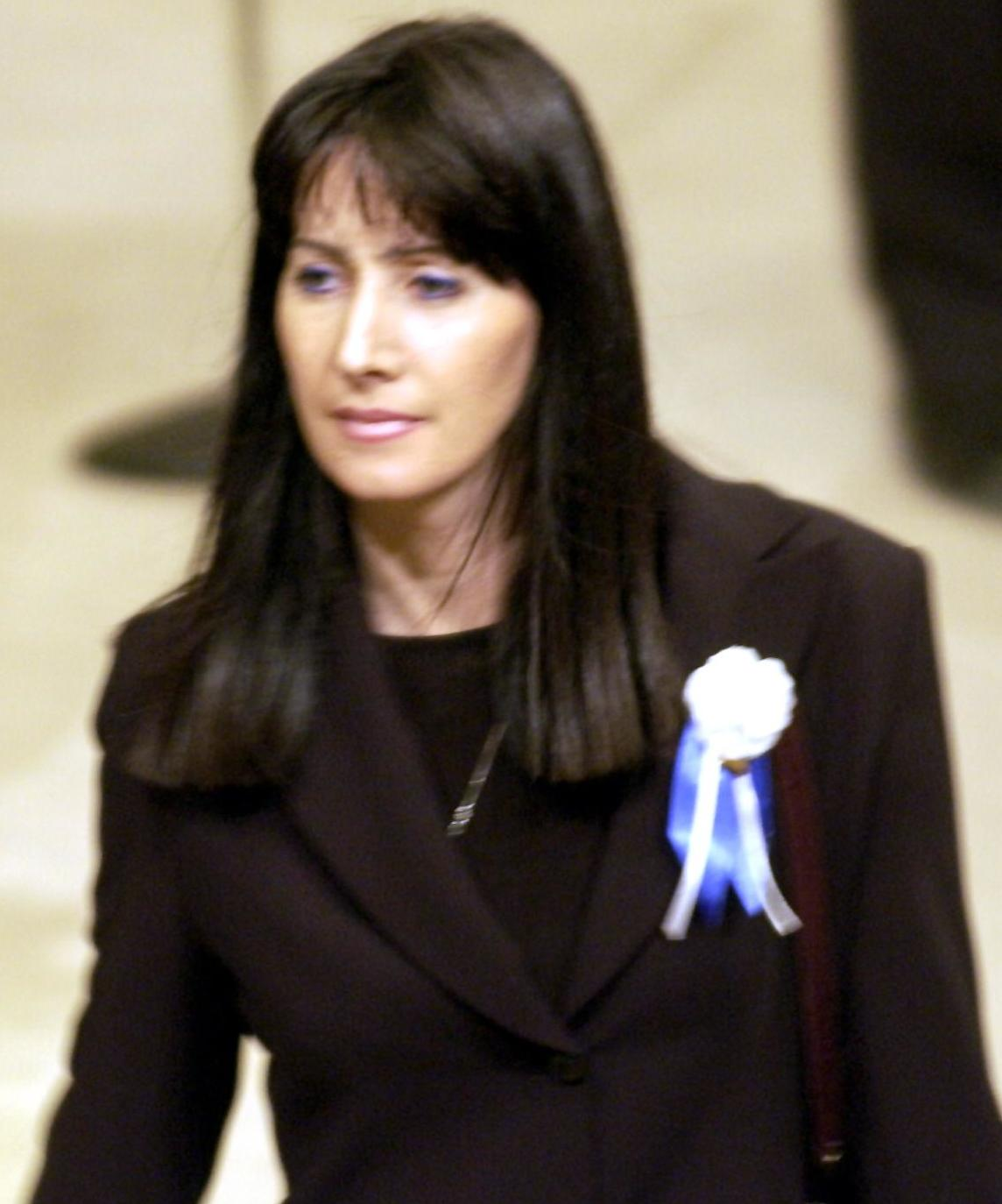
- Nass in 2003

Faction represented in the Knesset
- 2003–2006: Likud
- 2009–2013: Likud

Personal details
- Born: 27 December 1961 (age 64) Israel

Lea Nass (Hebrew: לאה נס; born 27 December 1961) is an Israeli politician who served a member of the Knesset for Likud and as Deputy Minister of Pensioner Affairs.

== Biography ==
Nass studied for her B.A., M.A. and PhD degrees in biochemistry at Bar-Ilan University, completing her doctorate in 1993. Her research topic was sperm motility. Nass is married to Shlomo Nass, an accountant specializing in liquidations and receiverships, and has five children.

== Political career ==
After the completion of her PhD she was elected to Giv'at Shmuel city council, and was responsible for city beautification, sanitation, and the environment from 1993 until 2003. In 1998 and from 2002 until 2003, she also served as deputy mayor.

She was placed in 36th place on the Likud list for the 2003 elections. At the time, she described herself as "the only religious woman in the Likud". When Likud won 38 seats, she became a Knesset member and chaired the Science and Technology committee.

For the 2006 elections she won 17th place on the party's list, but lost her seat as the party was reduced to 12 seats.

In the Likud primaries for the 2009 Knesset elections, held on 8 December 2008, she won tenth spot on the list and was the top female candidate. She returned to the Knesset as Likud won 27 seats in the election, and was appointed Deputy Minister of Pensioner Affairs. Prior to the 2013 elections Nass was placed sixtieth on the joint Likud Yisrael Beiteinu list. She left the Knesset after the alliance won 31 seats.
