= Alex Miller (politician) =

Israeli politician

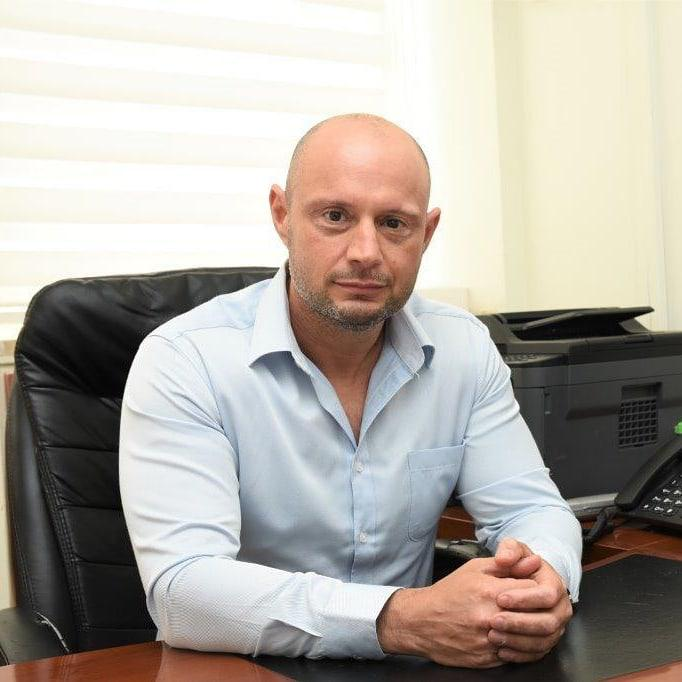
- Miller in 2025

Faction represented in the Knesset
- 2006–2013: Yisrael Beiteinu
- 2014–2015: Yisrael Beiteinu

Personal details
- Born: 4 April 1977 (age 49) Moscow, Soviet Union

Alex Miller (Hebrew: אלכס מילר; born 4 April 1977) is an Israeli politician who served as a member of the Knesset for Yisrael Beiteinu from 2006 until 2013 and again from 2014 until 2015. He is currently chairman of the Histadrut division for work with repatriates and interaction with national institutions, chairman of the Board of Directors of the educational network "Amal" and a member of the board of directors of the Company of Culture and Sports Centers.

== Biography ==
Born in Moscow, Soviet Union (now Russia), Miller emigrated to Israel on 29 January 1992. He gained a BA in education and an MA in Public Policy.

For the 2006 Knesset elections he was placed tenth on the Yisrael Beiteinu list, and became a Knesset member when the party won 11 seats. During his first term he chaired the subcommittee for alternative energy sources.

Moved down to fifteenth on the party's list for the 2009 elections, Miller barely retained his seat as Yisrael Beiteinu won 15 seats. For the 2013 elections he was placed 33rd on the joint Likud Yisrael Beiteinu list, and lost his seat as the alliance won only 31 seats. However, he returned to the Knesset on 6 August 2014 as a replacement for Carmel Shama, who resigned after becoming Israel's envoy to the OECD.

He was placed eleventh on the party's list for the 2015 elections, losing his seat when the party was reduced to six seats.

On 18 January 2021 Miller was appointed chairman of the Board of Directors of the educational network "Amal". On 14 September 2021 he was appointed chairman of the Histadrut division for work with repatriates and interaction with national institutions.
