= Avraham Michaeli =

Israeli politician

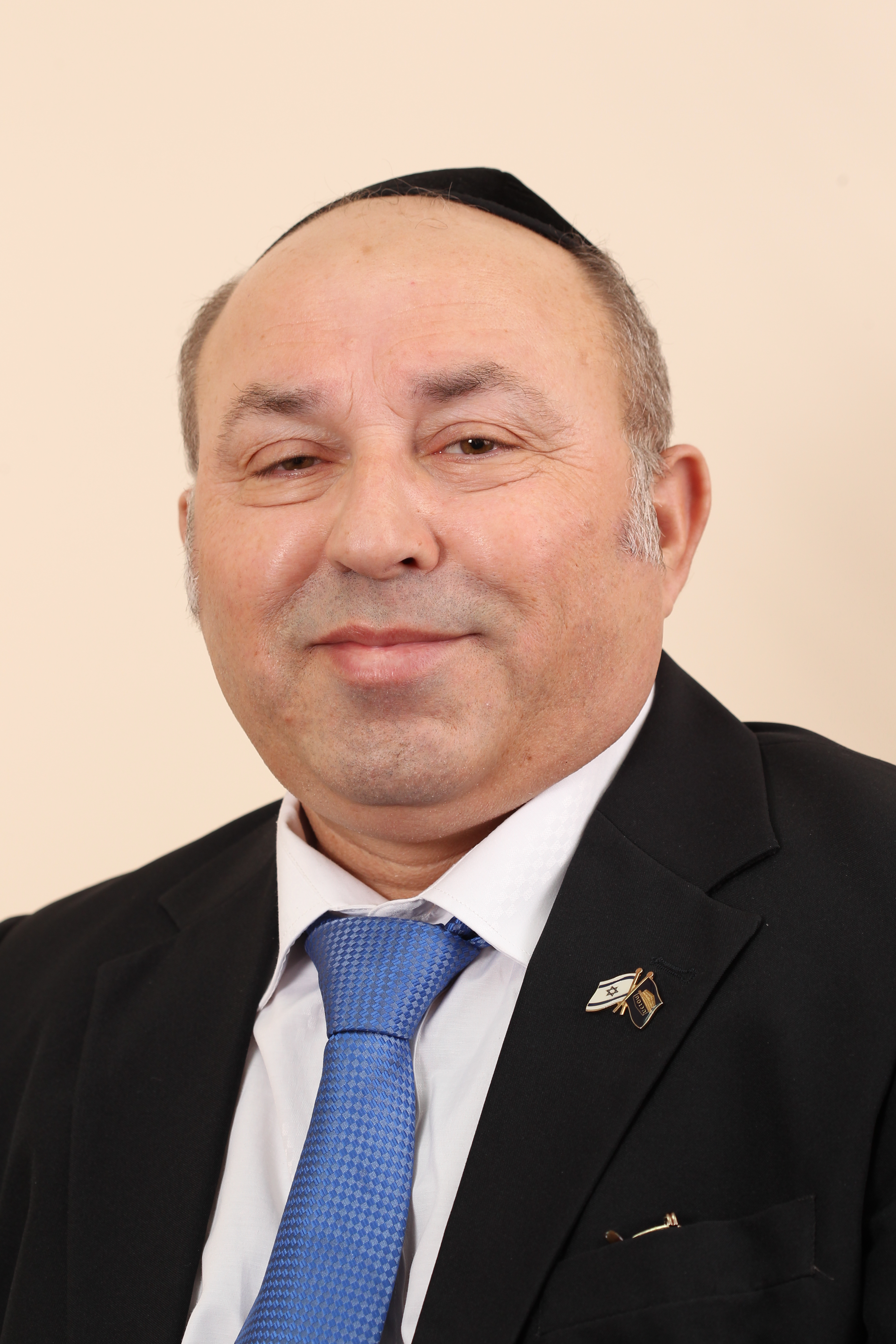
- Michaeli in 2013

Faction represented in the Knesset
- 2006–2015: Shas

Personal details
- Born: 29 March 1957 (age 68); Kulashi, Soviet Union

Avraham Michaeli (Hebrew: אברהם מיכאלי; born 29 March 1957) is an Israeli politician. He served as a member of the Knesset for Shas between 2006 and 2015.

== Biography ==
Born in Kulashi in the Soviet Union (today in Georgia) as Abraam Mikhelashvili (Georgian: აბრაამ მიხელაშვილი), Michaeli made aliyah to Israel on 29 June 1971. He studied at Yeshivat Har Etzion, and he attended Bar-Ilan University where he studied law, gaining an LLB in 1984. In 2006 he was placed twelfth on the Shas list for the Knesset elections that year, and became a Knesset member after the party won 12 seats. He retained his seat in the 2009 elections, having been placed eleventh on the Shas list. He was re-elected for a third term in 2013 after again being placed eleventh on the party's list.

He was placed eighth on the Shas list for the 2015 elections, but lost his seat as the party was reduced to seven seats.

Michaeli currently lives in Or Yehuda.
