= Yoram Marciano =

Israeli politician

- יורם מרציאנו
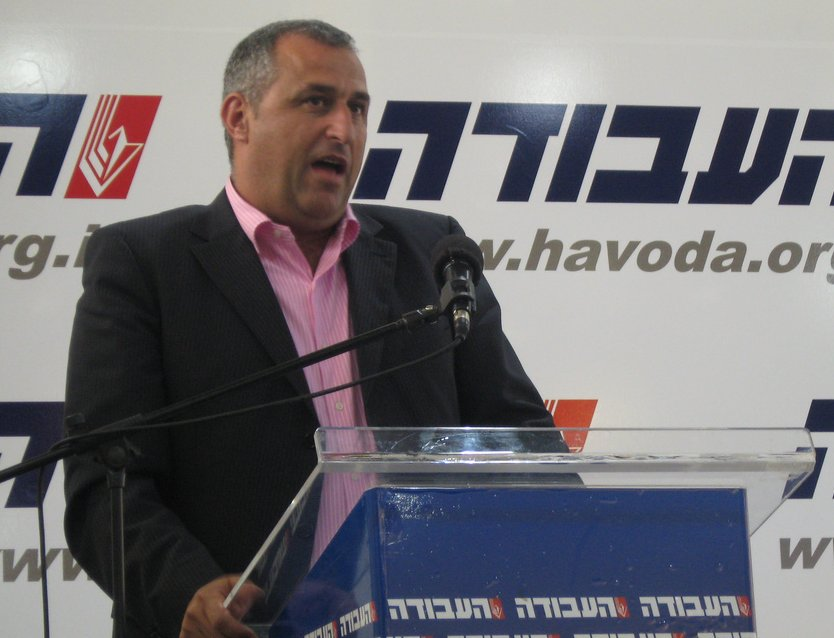
- Marciano in 2008

Faction represented in the Knesset
- 2006–2009: Labor Party
- 2012–2013: Labor Party

Personal details
- Born: 31 October 1964 (age 60); Lod, Israel

Yoram Marciano (Hebrew: יורם מרציאנו; born 31 October 1964) is an Israeli politician. He served as a member of the Knesset for the Labor Party from 2006 to 2009, and again between 2012 and 2013.

== Biography ==
Born in Lod, Marciano was first elected to the Knesset in the 2006 elections and served as the Labor-Meimad Parliamentary Group Chairman. Placed seventeenth on the party's list, he lost his seat in the 2009 elections when it was reduced to 13 seats. However, he re-entered the Knesset on 9 December 2012 as a replacement for Amir Peretz, who had left the party to join Hatnuah. He did not contend in the 2013 elections, and subsequently lost his seat.

Marciano has about 70 convictions for traffic law violations. He was also involved in a violent incident in a pub, after which he complained about his own behavior in the ethics committee of the Knesset, and was found guilty.
