= Ronit Tirosh =

Israeli politician

- רונית תירוש
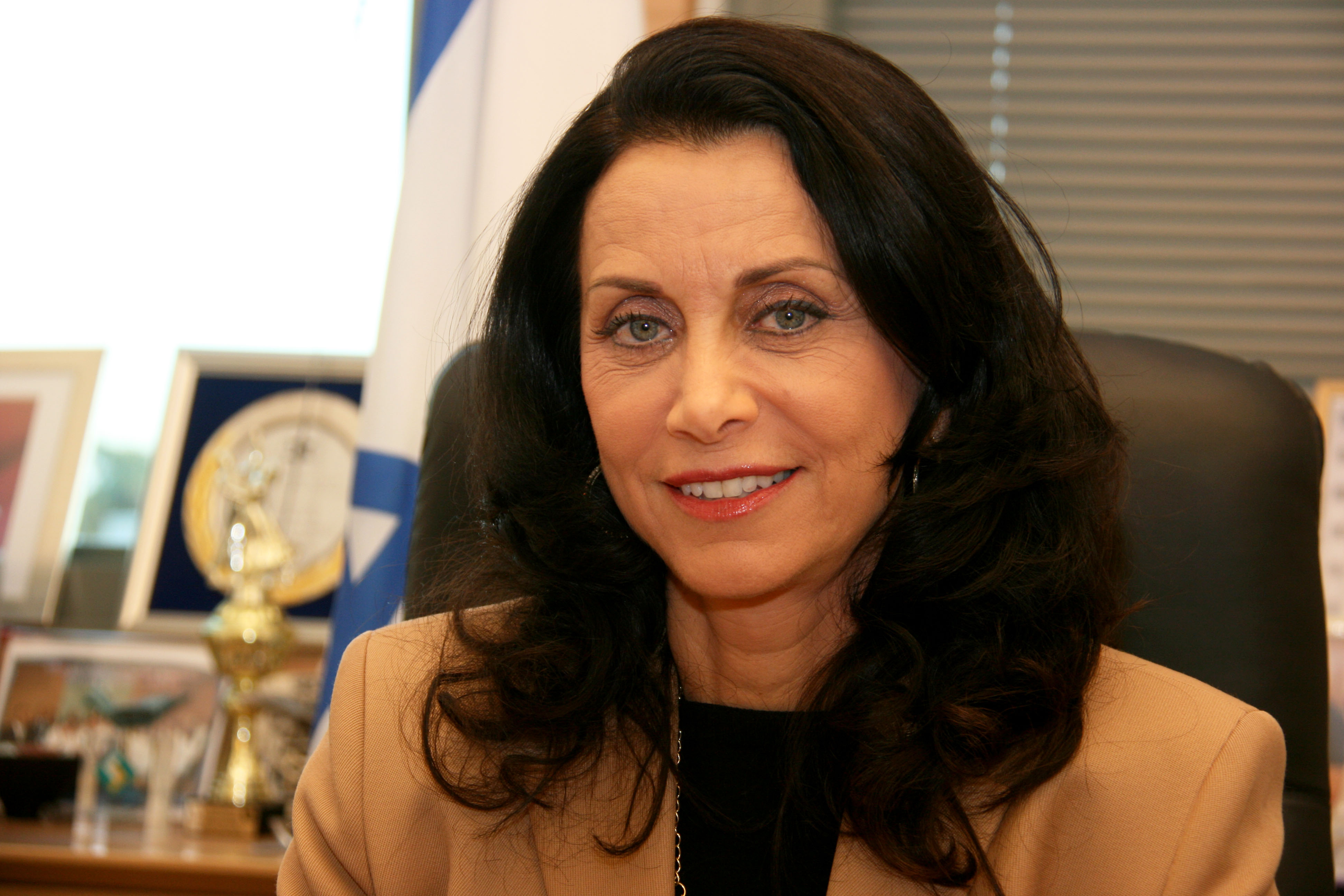

Faction represented in the Knesset
- 2006–2013: Kadima

Personal details
- Born: 8 December 1953 (age 71) Tel Aviv, Israel

Ronit Tirosh (Hebrew: רונית תירוש; born 8 December 1953) is an Israeli politician who served as a member of the Knesset for Kadima between 2006 and 2013.

== Biography ==
Born in Tel Aviv, Tirosh gained a BA in Arabic Literature and General Philosophy from Tel Aviv University after completing her national service. She went on to postgraduate studies in Educational Management and Organization also at Tel Aviv University, and received with an MA in 1986.

She started her teaching career in 1977, first teaching Arabic at Gretz Elementary School in Tel Aviv. In 1979 she became a teacher of Arabic at Tel Aviv's Municipal High School Tet. Later appointed vice-principal, then promoted to the position of Principal in 1988 and in 1992 she won the Outstanding Principal award from the Ministry of Education.

In 1997 she became Head of the Education Administration in the Tel Aviv Municipality, and was made Person of the Year in Education by the Education Ministry in 2000. The following year she was appointed Director General of the Ministry. In 2005 she was listed as both one of the Forbes 50 Strongest Women and one of Globes 50 Most Influential Women.

Tirosh joined Ariel Sharon's new party Kadima, and was listed 25th on the party's list for the 2006 elections. She became an MK when the party won 29 seats, and served as a member of the Education, Culture and Sports Committee and chaired the lobby for the Advancement of Education in her first term. She retained her seat in the 2009 elections after being placed 16th on the Kadima list.

In the 18th Knesset, Tirosh initiated a law to provide additional rights to consumers when receiving credit from retailers, including removing expiration dates and removing the need for the consumer to provide a receipt.

Placed fourth on the Kadima list for the 2013 elections, Tirosh lost her seat when the party was reduced to two MKs.

=== Personal life ===
Tirosh lives in Ramat Gan. She is married and has three children. She studies towards a PhD at Tel Aviv University.
