= Doron Avital =

Israeli politician

Faction represented in the Knesset
- 2011–2013: Kadima

Personal details
- Born: 22 January 1959 (age 67) Brit Ahim, Israel

Doron Shalom Avital (Hebrew: דורון שלום אביטל; born 22 January 1959) is an Israeli politician who served as a member of the Knesset for Kadima between 2011 and 2013.

== Biography ==
Born in the Brit Ahim youth village near Bustan HaGalil, Avital moved to the Katamon neighbourhood of Jerusalem as a child. He attended high school in the Hebrew University Secondary School. During the 1982 Lebanon War he served as commander of Battalion 202. Between 1992 and 1994 he was commander of Sayeret Matkal. For the 2009 Knesset elections, he was placed thirty-second on the Kadima list. Although he failed to win a seat, he entered the Knesset as a replacement for the deceased Ze'ev Boim in 2011.

Avital was placed seventh on the Kadima list for the 2013 elections, losing his seat as the party was reduced to two MKs.

He holds a BA in mathematics and computer science, a master's degree in history and philosophy of science, both from Tel Aviv University, as well as a PhD in logic and philosophy from Columbia University.
