= Orit Zuaretz =

Israeli politician

- אורית זוארץ
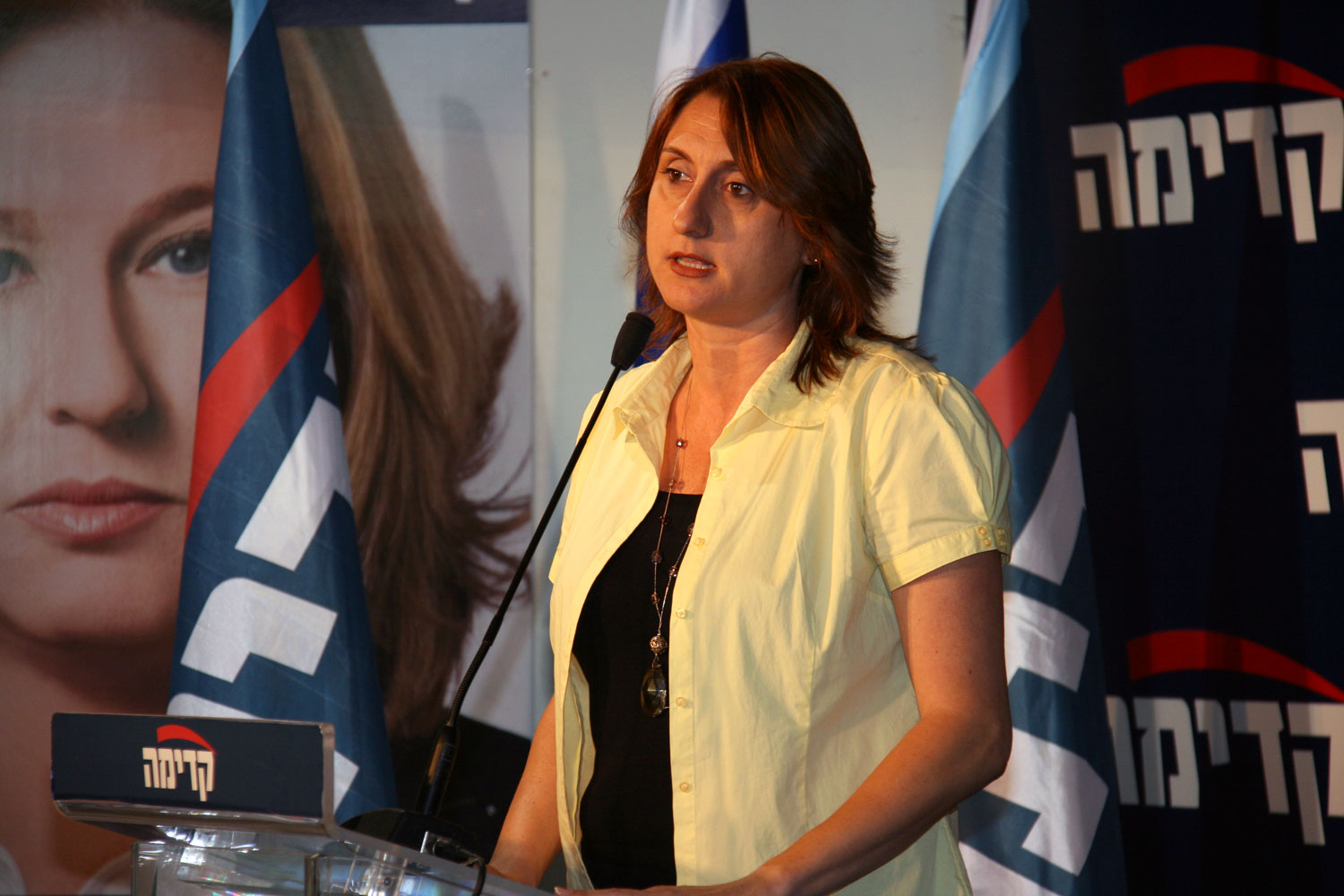
- Zuaretz in 2009

Faction represented in the Knesset
- 2009–2012: Kadima
- 2012–2013: Hatnuah

Personal details
- Born: 21 February 1967 (age 58); Soviet Union

Orit Zuaretz (Hebrew: אורית זוארץ; born 21 February 1967) is an Israeli politician who served as a member of the Knesset for Kadima and Hatnuah between 2009 and 2013.

== Biography ==
Born Svetlana Moiseyevna Chernyak (Russian: Светлана Моисеевна Черняк) in the Soviet Union, Zuaretz emigrated to Israel in 1971. She gained a BA in Social Science studied towards an MA in the New Age Middle East.

She was elected onto the Kadima-Tzoran local council in 2003, serving as the town's deputy mayor until 2006. She also served as a member of the Jewish Agency Directors Forum for Russian-speaking elected representatives.

Prior to the 2009 elections she was placed twenty-eighth on the Kadima list, and entered the Knesset when the party won 28 seats.

In 2012 she left Kadima to join the new Hatnuah party. Placed tenth on its list for the 2013 elections, she lost her seat when the party won only six seats.

Zuaretz lives in Kadima-Tzoran and is married with three children.
