= Moshe Matalon (politician) =

Israeli politician (born 1953)

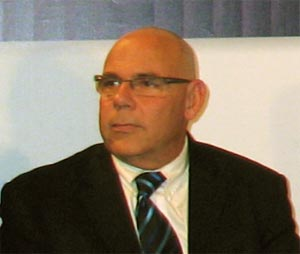

Faction represented in the Knesset
- 2009–2013: Yisrael Beiteinu

Personal details
- Born: 12 May 1953 (age 73) Tel Aviv, Israel

Moshe "Mutz" Matalon (Hebrew: משה "מוץ" מטלון; born 12 May 1953) is an Israeli politician who served as a member of the Knesset for Yisrael Beiteinu between 2009 and 2013. He is of Sephardic Jewish ancestry.

== Biography ==
During his national service, Matalon served as a paratrooper. He was injured during the Yom Kippur War, and has used a wheelchair since, while practicing disabled sports and competing in javelin and shot put at the 1976 Summer Paralympics.

As a Likud member, Matalon was elected to Herzliya city council in 1994, serving until 2000. Between 2000 and 2008 he was chairman of the IDF Disabled Veterans' Organization, and also served as chairman of the IDF's Disabled Fund. In these positions, he headed the Israeli delegations to the Paralympics in 2004 and 2008.

He was placed thirteenth on the Yisrael Beiteinu list prior to the 2009 elections, and entered the Knesset when the party won 15 seats. For the 2013 elections he was placed 46th on the joint Likud Yisrael Beiteinu list, losing his seat as the alliance won only 31 seats. Prior to the April 2019 elections he joined the new Telem party, and was placed 36th on the Blue and White alliance list, which won 35 seats.

Matalon currently lives in Herzliya, and is married with four children.
