= Otniel Schneller =

Israeli politician

- עתניאל שנלר
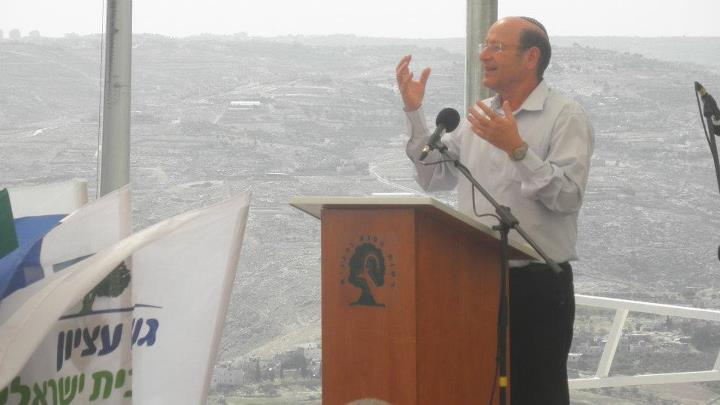

Faction represented in the Knesset
- 2006–2013: Kadima

Personal details
- Born: 28 January 1952 (age 74) Jerusalem, Israel

Otniel Schneller (Hebrew: עתניאל שנלר; born 28 January 1952) is an Israeli politician who served as a member of the Knesset for Kadima between 2006 and 2013.

== Biography ==
Born in Jerusalem, and raised in Michigan, Schneller took Jewish studies and social science at Bar-Ilan University, finishing his studies in 1978. Between 1983 and 1986 he served as secretary general of the Yesha Council, the body representing Israeli settlers in Gaza and the West Bank. In 1986 he became director general of the National Safety Authority in the Ministry of Transportation, a role he held until 1996. Schneller has attended rallies organized by Im Tirtzu, an Israeli far-right group.

In the run-up to the 2006 elections he was placed twenty-sixth on Kadima's list. With the party winning 29 seats, he entered the Knesset, and was appointed Deputy Speaker of the Knesset. Placed twenty-seventh on the party's list, he retained his seat in the 2009 elections. He lost his seat in the 2013 elections.

Schneller lives in the settlement of Ma'ale Mikhmas in the West Bank.

== Bibliography ==
- Paper Bridge (2005) (in Hebrew)
