= Aryeh Bibi =

Israeli politician

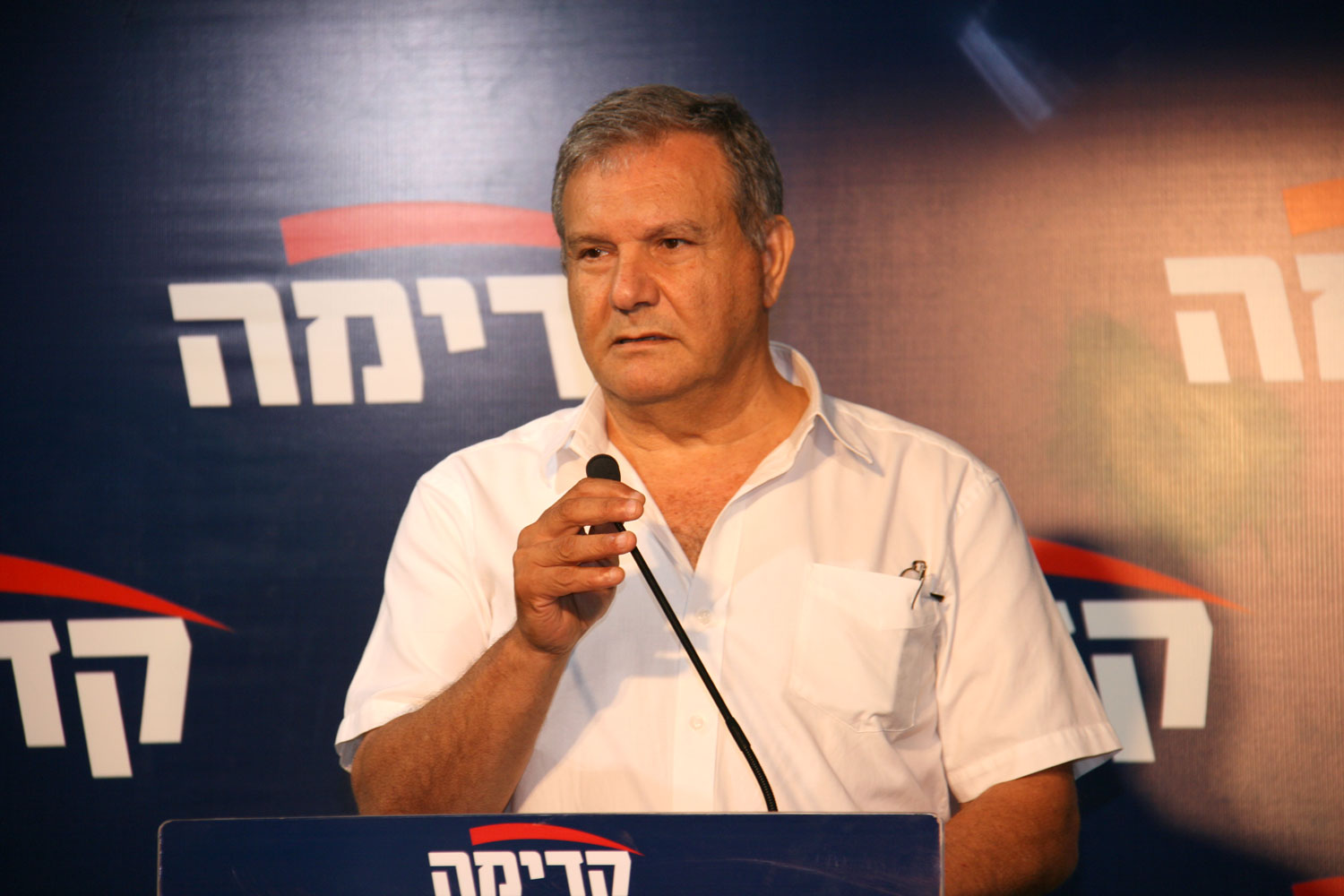

Faction represented in the Knesset
- 2009–2013: Kadima

Personal details
- Born: 28 April 1943 (age 82) Baghdad, Iraq

Aryeh Bibi (Hebrew: אריה ביבי; born 28 April 1943) is an Israeli politician who served as a member of the Knesset for Kadima between 2009 and 2013.

== Biography ==
Born in Baghdad in Iraq in 1943, Bibi made aliyah to Israel in 1950. He started his military service in the paratroopers brigade, later serving as commander of the Gaza Strip. He received a BA in the history of Israel.

He joined Israel Police, and served as commanding officer of the Yarkon region and Jerusalem, head of the police's general headquarters, and commissioner of the Israel Prison Service between 1993 and 1997. He also chaired the country's anti-drug authority and Lod's temporary local council.

Prior to the 2009 elections he was placed twenty-sixth on the Kadima list and entered the Knesset as the party won 28 seats. Shortly before the 2013 elections Bibi left Kadima to join Likud. He was placed 63rd on the joint Likud Yisrael Beiteinu list, losing his seat as the alliance won only 31 seats.

Bibi currently lives in Petah Tikva, and is married to Helena Bibi, a former senior officer in the Israel Police and the Israel Prison Service, with four children. He is the father of Moshik Bibi, the director of Kadima faction in the Knesset.
