= Nino Abesadze =

Israeli politician and journalist

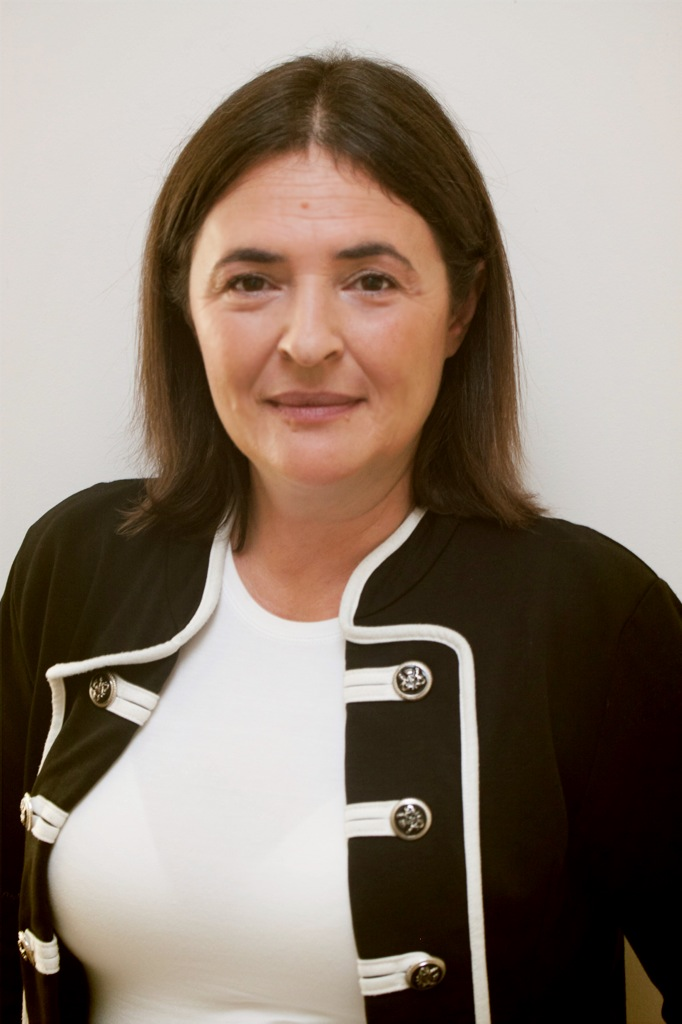
- Abesadze in 2012

Faction represented in the Knesset
- 2010–2013: Kadima

Personal details
- Born: 12 April 1965 (age 61) Tbilisi, Soviet Union

Nino Abesadze (Hebrew: נינו אבסדזה, Georgian: ნინო აბესაძე; born 12 April 1965) is an Israeli politician and journalist who served as a member of the Knesset for Kadima between 2009 and 2013.

== Biography ==
Born in Tbilisi in the Soviet Union (today in Georgia) to a Georgian Christian father and Russian-Jewish mother, Abesadze graduated from the Film School at the Open University of Georgia, before studying for degrees in Russian literature and linguistics at Tbilisi State University. At the age of 23 she began working for Georgian State Television, becoming the presenter of the evening news two years later.

Her mother and three sisters had immigrated to Israel after her father died in 1980, settling in Rehovot, and later Ashdod. Abesadze remained in Georgia, and in the 1990s began a relationship with Baruch Ben-Neria, the Israeli ambassador to Georgia and Armenia from 1993 until 1996. She moved to Israel in 1996 and worked on Russian language programmes for Channel 33, before joining a Russian language newspaper.

A member of Kadima, she was on the party's list for the 2009 Knesset elections, but was not high enough on the list to win a seat. However, she entered the Knesset on 9 November 2010 as a replacement for Tzachi Hanegbi, who had been convicted of a crime (perjury) deemed to be of moral turpitude, thereby losing his seat.

Shortly before the 2013 elections Abesadze left Kadima to join the Labor Party. She was placed 19th on the Labor Party list, but lost her seat when the party won only 15 seats.

She lives in Kokhav Ya'ir with her boyfriend and their two children. She is a tour guide specialising in trips to Georgia.
