= Robert Tiviaev =

Israeli politician

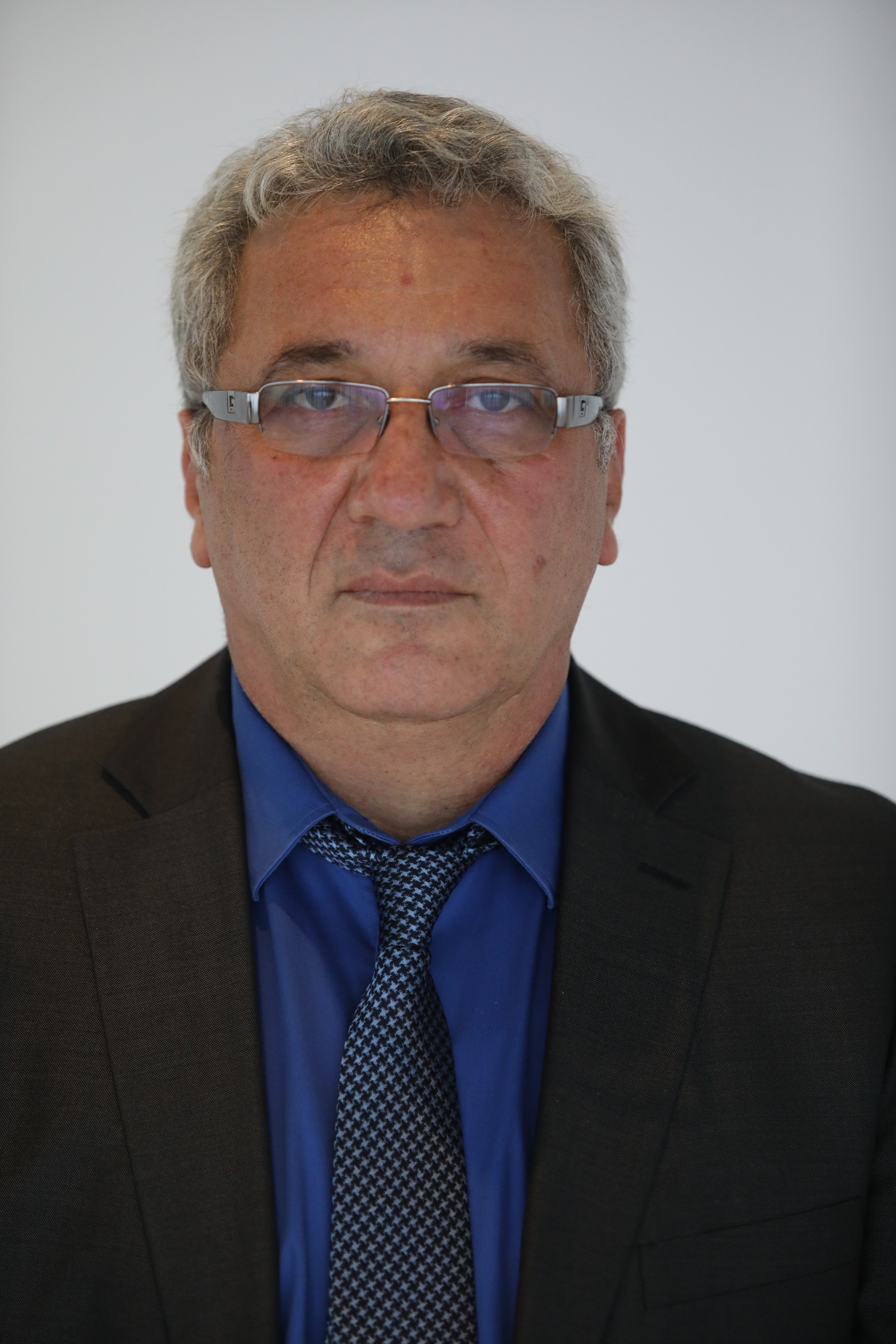
- Tiviaev in 2018

Faction represented in the Knesset
- 2009–2012: Kadima
- 2012–2013: Hatnuah
- 2018–2019: Zionist Union
- 2019: Hatnua

Personal details
- Born: 22 June 1961 (age 65) Derbent, Soviet Union

Robert Tiviaev (Hebrew: רוברט טיבייב; born 22 June 1961) is an Israeli politician who served as a member of the Knesset for Kadima, Hatnuah and the Zionist Union in two spells between 2009 and 2019.

== Biography ==
Tiviaev was born in Derbent, Dagestan, in the Soviet Union (today in Russia), and is of Mountain Jewish origin. He served in the Soviet Army as an officer in the liaison corps, reaching the rank of captain. He emigrated to Israel in 1994 and settled in Ofakim. He became a member of the city council, and held the portfolio responsible for immigrant absorption. In addition, he chairs the Tehiya fund, which helps bring immigrants from the former Soviet Union.

A former member of Yisrael Beiteinu, prior to the 2009 elections he won twentieth place on the Kadima list, and entered the Knesset as the party won 28 seats. In 2012 he left to join the new Hatnuah party, and was placed fourteenth on its list for the 2013 elections. He lost his seat when the party won only six seats. Hatnuah contested the 2015 Knesset elections on a joint list with the Labor Party under the name Zionist Union, with Tiviaev placed 28th on its list. Although the alliance won only 24 seats, Tiviaev entered the Knesset on 31 July 2018 as a replacement for Isaac Herzog. He lost his seat in the April 2019 elections.

Tiviaev is married with two children. He holds a master's degree in electrical engineering and works for the Israel Electric Corporation.
