= Yulia Shamalov-Berkovich =

Israeli politician (born 1964)

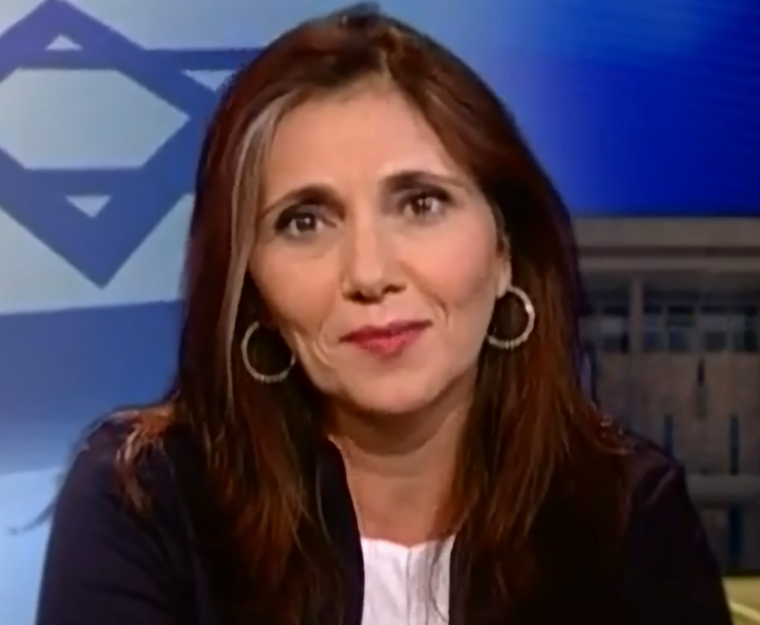

Faction represented in the Knesset
- 2009–2013: Kadima

Personal details
- Born: 1 April 1964 (age 62) Samarkand, Soviet Union

Yulia Shamalov-Berkovich (Hebrew: יוליה שמאלוב-ברקוביץ'; born 1 April 1964) is an Israeli politician who served as a member of the Knesset for Kadima between 2009 and 2013. She was amongst the founders of Israel Plus, the country's Russian language television channel, and Vesti, its largest Russian-language newspaper. She also worked as a marketing and media consultant.

== Biography ==
Born in Samarkand in the Soviet Union (today in Uzbekistan), Shamalov emigrated to Israel in 1979. Between 1983 and 1984 she studied for a certificate in Journalism and Television, before studying for a BA in sociology and anthropology at Tel Aviv University between 1985 and 1988. She later returned to the university to complete an MBA in 1998.

She joined Kadima shortly after its establishment, and was placed fortieth on its list for the 2006 Knesset elections, but missed out on a seat. She was placed twenty-ninth on the party's list for the 2009 elections, but missed out on a seat again as the party won 28 seats. However, she entered the Knesset on 2 July 2009 as a replacement for Haim Ramon, who had resigned.

In December 2012 it was announced that she would head the Economics Party's list for the 2013 elections. However, the party failed to cross the electoral threshold and she subsequently lost her seat.

== Personal life ==
She is married with two children. She hyphenated her husband's last name to her own after marriage.
