= Shaul Mofaz =

Israeli politician and military officer

- שאול מופז
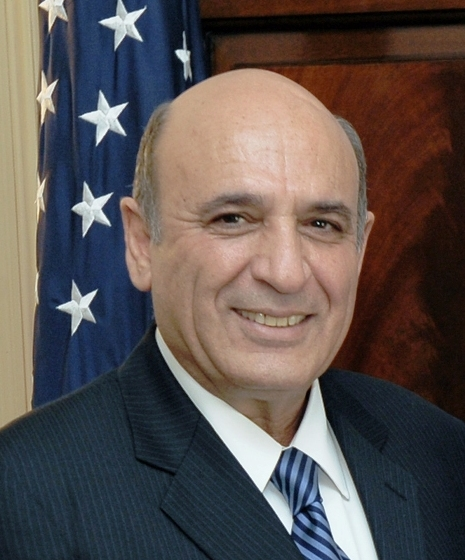
- Mofaz in 2012

Leader of the Opposition
- In office 23 July 2012 – 5 February 2013
- Prime Minister: Benjamin Netanyahu
- Preceded by: Shelly Yachimovich
- Succeeded by: Shelly Yachimovich
- In office 2 April 2012 – 9 May 2012
- Prime Minister: Benjamin Netanyahu
- Preceded by: Tzipi Livni
- Succeeded by: Shelly Yachimovich

Ministerial roles
- 2002–2006: Minister of Defense
- 2006–2009: Deputy Prime Minister
- 2006–2009: Minister of Transportation
- 2012: Vice Prime Minister
- 2012: Minister without Portfolio

Faction represented in the Knesset
- 2006–2015: Kadima

Personal details
- Born: 4 November 1948 (age 77) Tehran, Iran

Military service
- Allegiance: Israel
- Branch/service: Israel Defense Forces
- Years of service: 1966–2002 (36 years)
- Rank: Rav Aluf (Chief of Staff; highest rank)
- Commands: 202 Paratrooper battalion; Paratroopers Brigade; 769th Division; IDF Officer's school; 91st Division; Judea and Samaria Division; Southern Command; Planning Directorate; Deputy Chief of Staff; Operations Directorate; Chief of General Staff
- Battles/wars: Six-Day War; War of Attrition; Yom Kippur War; Operation Entebbe; First Lebanon War; First Intifada; Second Intifada; Operation Defensive Shield

Shaul Mofaz (Hebrew: שאול מופז; 4 November 1948) is a retired Israeli military officer and politician. He joined the Israel Defense Forces in 1966 and served in the Paratroopers Brigade. He fought in the Six-Day War, Yom Kippur War, 1982 Lebanon War, and Operation Entebbe with the paratroopers and Sayeret Matkal, an elite special forces unit. In 1998 he became the IDF's sixteenth Chief of staff, serving until 2002. He is of Iranian Jewish ancestry.

After leaving the army, he entered politics. He was appointed Minister of Defense in 2002, holding the position until 2006, when he was elected to the Knesset on the Kadima list. He then served as Deputy Prime Minister and Minister of Transportation and Road Safety until 2009. After becoming Kadima leader in March 2012, he became Leader of the Opposition, before returning to the cabinet during a 70-day spell in which he served as Acting Prime Minister, Vice Prime Minister and Minister without Portfolio. Kadima was reduced to just two seats in the 2013 elections, and Mofaz retired from politics shortly before the 2015 elections.

== Early life ==
Shaul Mofaz was born Shahrām Mofazzazkār (Persian: شهرام مفضض‌کار) on 4 November 1948 in Tehran, Iran, to Iranian Jewish parents from Isfahan and Gilan of Gilaki Jewish origin, and lived in Tehran until his family moved to Israel. His father was the principal of the ORT school in Tehran. Mofaz immigrated to Israel with his family in 1957 when he was nine years old. The family settled in Eilat, where Mofaz grew up. His father's attempt to open a small factory in Eilat failed, and he had to support the family by working as a menial laborer. His family lived in a one-and-a-half-room apartment and his parents struggled to put food on the table. At age 10 he had to work in construction to help support his family. Mofaz attended a religious elementary school in Eilat. At age 14, his father sent him to an agricultural boarding school in Nahalal in the Jezreel Valley, where studies were combined with agricultural work. Mofaz recalled the boarding school as his first real exposure to wider Israeli society and struggling to fit in and be seen as a "real Israeli", recalling that "you're in a class with children from Nahalal who are Israelis with real roots in the country, children of the valley nobility. These princes who live in the big houses on the big farms of Nahalal, and where do you come from? From nowhere, from Tehran, from Eilat, from a tiny apartment in a housing project." He became determined to become a paratrooper in the army, seeing it as a way to become fully Israeli.

== Military service ==
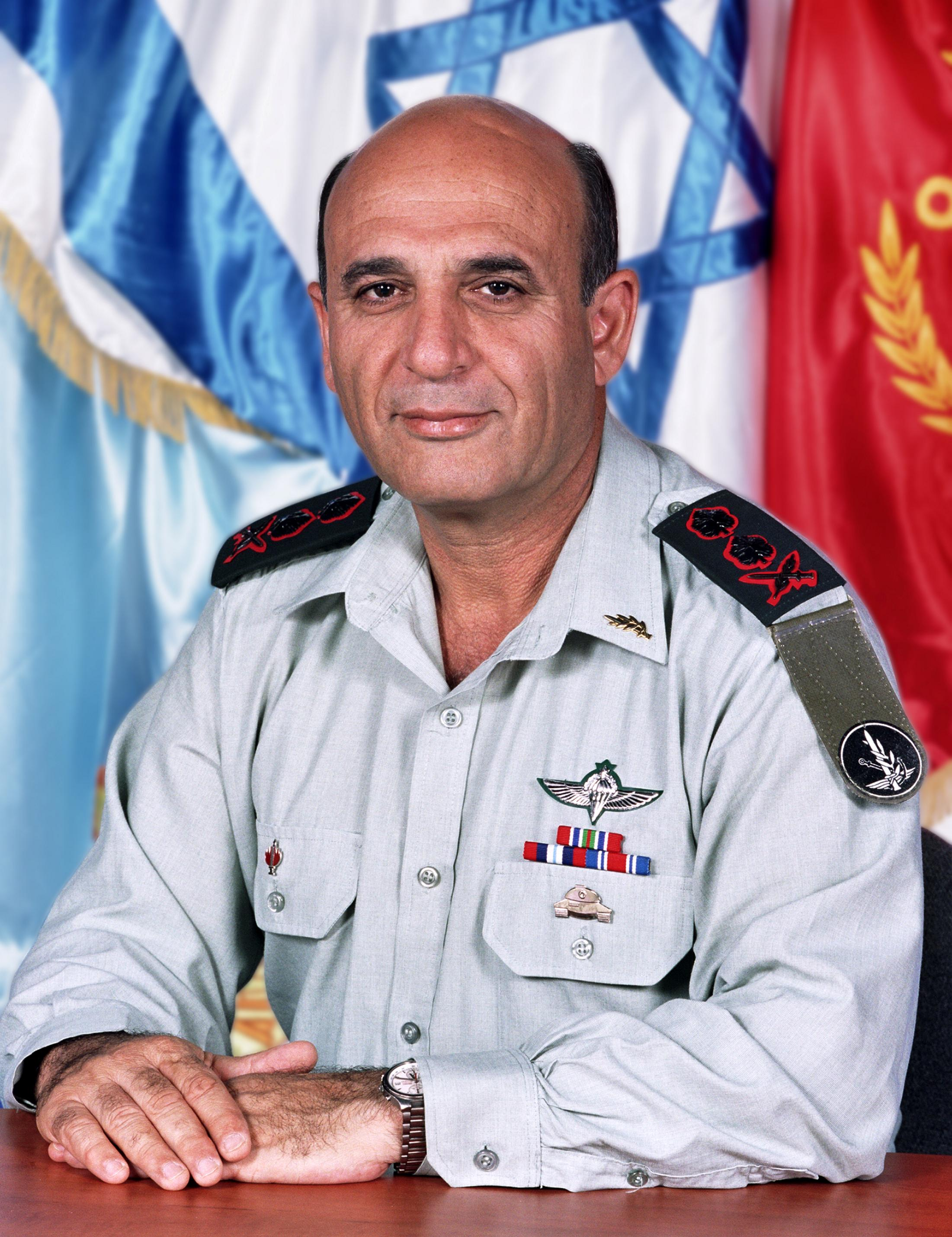
Shaul Mofaz as Chief of General Staff

Upon graduating from high school in 1966, he was conscripted into Israel Defense Forces and served in the Paratroopers Brigade. He fought in the Six-Day War as a paratrooper on the southern front against the Egyptian Army. After his mandatory service, Mofaz remained in the IDF as a career officer. He became an officer in 1969, commanded a paratrooper platoon in the 890th Battalion of the Paratroopers Brigade, then commanded a company of the 890th Battalion in 1971. He took part in the War of Attrition and the Yom Kippur War. During the Yom Kippur War, he participated in Operation Gown and Operation Davidka, two raids deep in Syrian territory. Mofaz became Deputy Commander of the 890th Battalion in 1974. He was appointed Deputy Commander of Sayeret Matkal, an elite commando unit, in 1975 and took part in Operation Entebbe the following year. After taking a sabbatical to study at Bar-Ilan University in 1976, he returned to active service in 1978. He was appointed commander of the 202nd Battalion of the Paratroopers Brigade, and became Deputy Commander of the Paratroopers Brigade in 1980. He commanded the 769th Territorial Brigade in 1981.

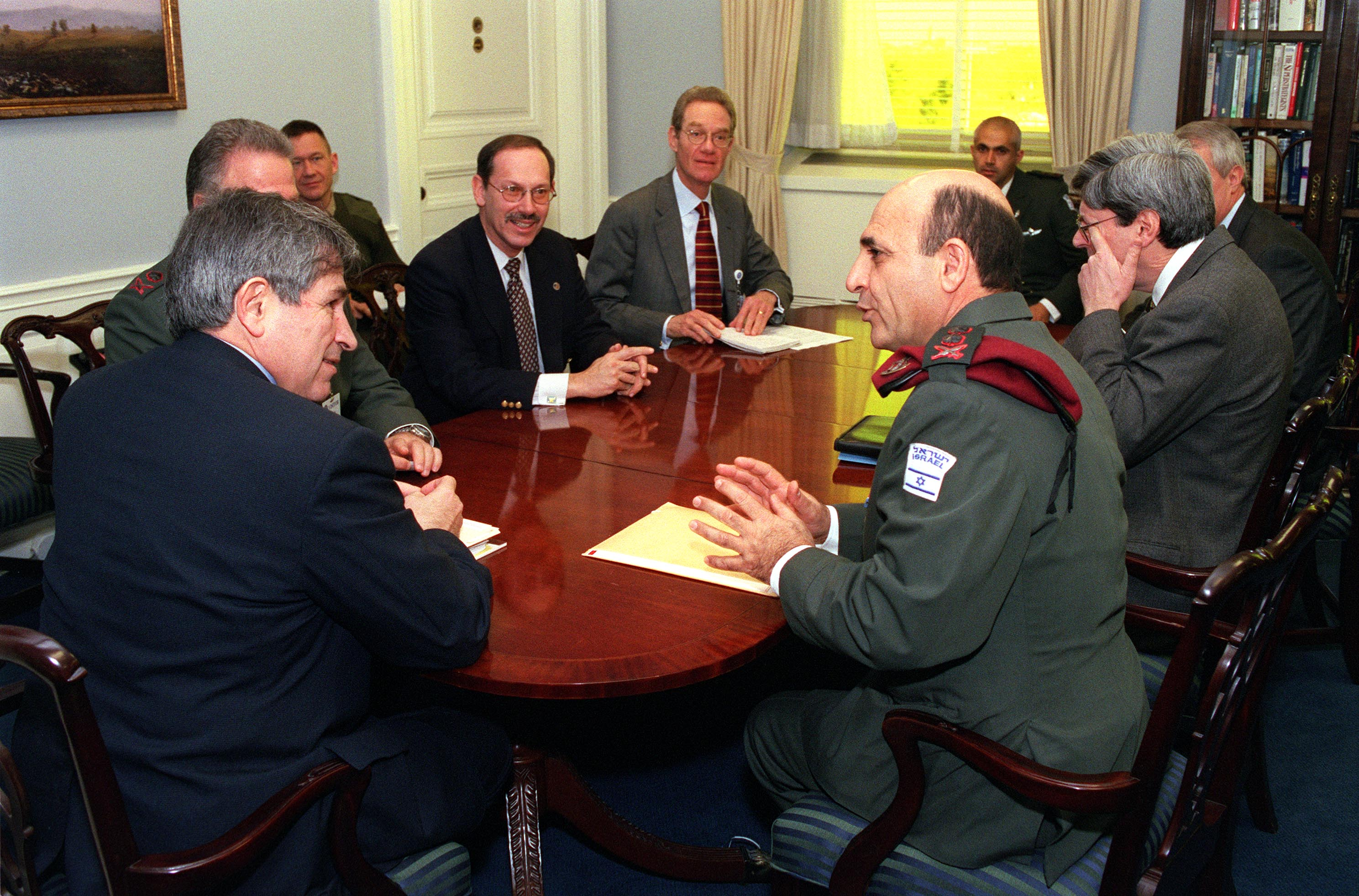
The Chief of Staff Gen. Shaul Mofaz (right foreground) meets with U.S. Deputy Secretary of Defense Paul Wolfowitz (left), and other senior U.S. Department of Defense officials in the Pentagon

Mofaz was an infantry brigade commander during the 1982 Lebanon War. Afterward, he attended the US Marine Corps Command and Staff College in Quantico, Virginia, United States. On his return, he was briefly appointed IDF Command and Staff College commander before returning to active service. He was appointed Commander of the Paratroopers Brigade in 1986, and led its forces in counterinsurgency operations in the South Lebanon security zone. He played a major role in Operation Law and Order.

Mofaz served in a series of senior military posts and was promoted to Brigadier General in 1988. In 1993 he was made commander of the IDF forces in the West Bank. In 1994, he was promoted to Major General, commanding the Southern Command, during which the IDF battled Hamas and Islamic Jihad networks in the Gaza Strip. In 1996, he served as head of the Planning Directorate of the IDF General Staff. His rapid rise continued; in 1997, Mofaz was appointed Deputy Chief of the General Staff and Commander of the Operations Directorate. In 1998, he was appointed Chief of the General Staff.

His term as Chief of Staff was noted for financial and structural reforms of the IDF. His tenure also saw continued operations in the South Lebanon security zone and the withdrawal from the security zone in 2000. But the most significant event in his tenure was the Second Intifada eruption in September 2000. The tough tactics undertaken by Mofaz drew widespread concern from the international community but were broadly supported by the Israeli public. Controversy erupted over Israeli actions during the Battle of Jenin, intermittent raids in the Gaza Strip, and the continued isolation of Yasser Arafat.

Mofaz had foreseen the wave of violence as early as 1999 and prepared the IDF for intense guerrilla warfare in the territories. He fortified posts in the Gaza Strip and kept Israeli military casualties low. While he was known for claiming, "Israel has the most moral army in the world," he drew criticism from both Israeli and international human rights monitoring groups because of the methods he had undertaken, including using armored bulldozers to demolish 2,500 Palestinian civilian homes, displacing thousands, to create a security "buffer zone" along the Rafah border.

== Political career ==
Following a government crisis in 2002, Shaul Mofaz was appointed Defense Minister by Ariel Sharon. Although he supported an agreement with the Palestinians, he was willing to make no compromise in the war against militant groups such as Hamas, Islamic Jihad, Tanzim, and Al-Aqsa Martyrs Brigades.

The fact that he had only recently left his position as IDF Chief of Staff prevented him from participating in the 2003 election (by which time Mofaz had joined Sharon's Likud). Nevertheless, Sharon reappointed him as Defense Minister in the new government.

On 21 November 2005, Mofaz rejected Sharon's invitation to join his new party, Kadima, and instead announced his candidacy for the leadership of Likud. But, on 11 December 2005, one day after he promised he would never leave the Likud, he withdrew from both the leadership race and the Likud to join Kadima.

Following the elections in late March 2006, Mofaz was moved from the position of Defense Minister and received the Transport ministry in the new Cabinet installed on 4 May 2006.

In 2008, with Israel's then prime minister, Ehud Olmert, being pressured to resign due to corruption charges, Mofaz announced that he would run for the leadership of the Kadima party.

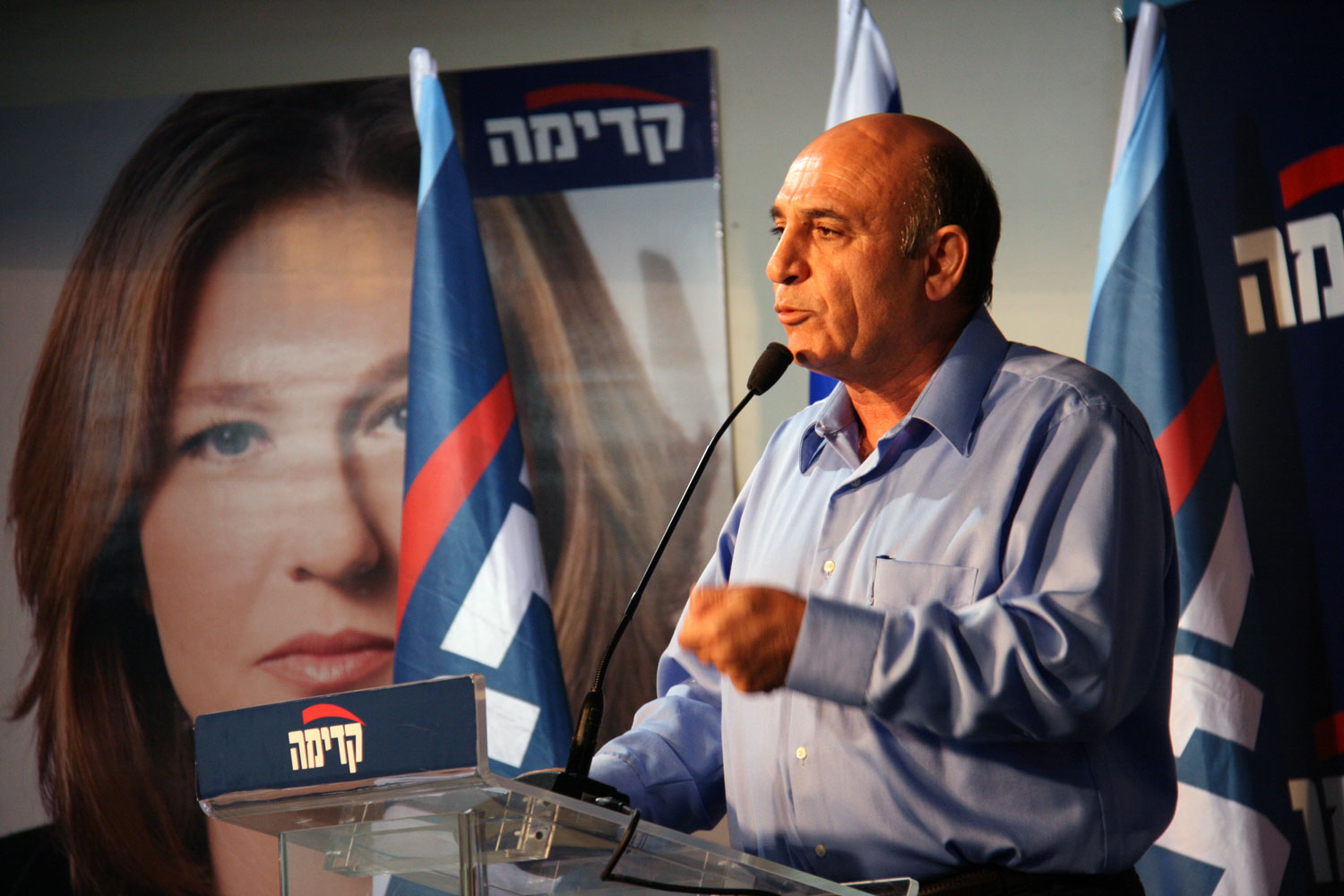
Mofaz at a Kadima rally, 2009

On 5 August 2008, Mofaz officially entered the race to be the leader of Kadima. That same day he received a blessing from Shas spiritual leader Rabbi Ovadia Yosef. On 17 September 2008, he lost the Kadima party election, losing to Tzipi Livni for the spot of Kadima's Prime Minister and leader. Livni's narrow margin of 431 votes was 43.1% to Shaul Mofaz's 42.0%, a huge difference from the 10 to 12-point exit polls margins. She said the "national responsibility (bestowed) by the public brings me to approach this job with great reverence". Mofaz accepted the Kadima primary's result, despite his lawyer, Yehuda Weinstein's appeal advice, and telephoned Livni congratulating her. Livni got 16,936 votes, with 16,505 votes, for Mofaz. Public Security Minister Avi Dichter and Interior Minister Meir Sheetrit had 6.5% and 8.5%, respectively.

Placed second on the Kadima list, Mofaz retained his seat in the 2009 elections, but lost his cabinet position after Likud formed the government.

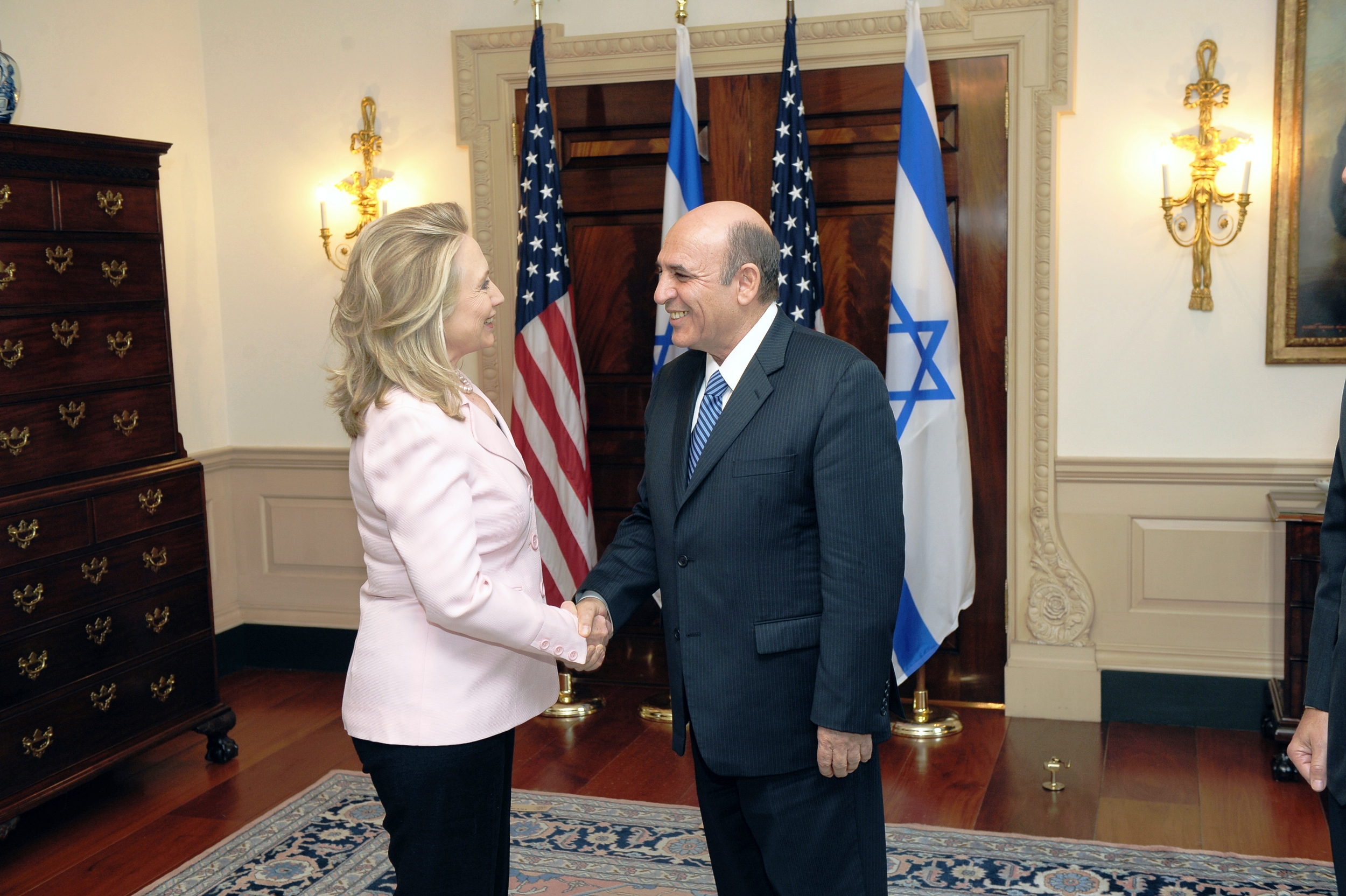
Deputy Prime Minister Shaul Mofaz with U.S. Secretary of State Hillary Clinton, 2012

On 27 March 2012, Shaul Mofaz won the Kadima party leadership primaries by a landslide, defeating party chairwoman Tzipi Livni. Mofaz became Vice Prime Minister as part of a deal reached for a government of national unity with Binyamin Netanyahu. Mofaz said during the Kadima primaries that he would not join a government led by Netanyahu.

Mofaz had Kadima withdraw from the government coalition over Netanyahu's indecision over a draft reform law and warned that the prime minister was trying to patch together a majority for a vote to plunge the region into war.

In 2013 Kadima, only four years after having been the ruling party, received a mere 2% of the votes, barely passing meeting the electoral threshold of the Knesset.

In the buildup to the 2015 elections Kadima was not expected to pass the threshold, as it was raised to 3.25%. Mofaz negotiated with the Zionist Union alliance to bring Kadima onto their slate, but ended negotiations when it became clear he would not be their candidate for Defense Minister. Immediately after Mofaz announced he was not joining the Zionist Union slate, it was announced the former Military Intelligence Directorate (Israel) head Amos Yadlin was appointed to the Zionist Union slate and would be their candidate for Defense Minister. Within a week of his announcement that he was not running with the Zionist Union, Mofaz announced his retirement from politics.

== Personal life ==
Mofaz is married to Orit with four children. His son Yonatan, named for Yonatan Netanyahu, also became an IDF officer and attained the rank of Colonel. He lives in Kochav Yair.

== In popular culture ==
A fictionalized version of Mofaz appeared in the 2008 drama film Lemon Tree.

== Awards and decorations ==
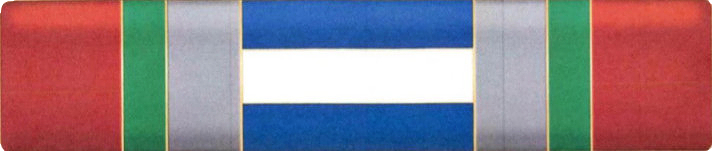

Six-Day War Ribbon	War of Attrition Ribbon	Yom Kippur War Ribbon	First Lebanon War Ribbon	South Lebanon Security Zone Ribbon

== See also ==
- Moshe Katsav
- List of Israel's Chiefs of the General Staff
- Iran–Israel relations
- Lemon Tree
