= 2009 Israeli legislative election =

- 10 February 2009
- All 120 seats in the Knesset; 61 seats needed for a majority
- Turnout: 64.72% (▲1.17pp)
| Party | Leader | Vote % | Seats | +/– |
|---|---|---|---|---|
| Kadima | Tzipi Livni | 22.47 | 28 | −1 |
| Likud–Ahi | Benjamin Netanyahu | 21.61 | 27 | +15 |
| Yisrael Beiteinu | Avigdor Lieberman | 11.70 | 15 | +4 |
| Labor | Ehud Barak | 9.93 | 13 | −6 |
| Shas | Eli Yishai | 8.49 | 11 | −1 |
| UTJ | Yaakov Litzman | 4.39 | 5 | −1 |
| Ra'am–Ta'al | Ibrahim Sarsur | 3.38 | 4 | 0 |
| National Union | Yaakov Katz | 3.34 | 4 | −2 |
| Hadash | Mohammad Barakeh | 3.32 | 4 | +1 |
| Meretz | Haim Oron | 2.95 | 3 | −2 |
| Jewish Home | Daniel Hershkowitz | 2.87 | 3 | 0 |
| Balad | Jamal Zahalka | 2.48 | 3 | 0 |
This lists parties that won seats. See the complete results below.
| Prime Minister before | Prime Minister after |
|---|---|
| Ehud Olmert; Kadima (31st) | Benjamin Netanyahu; Likud (32nd) |

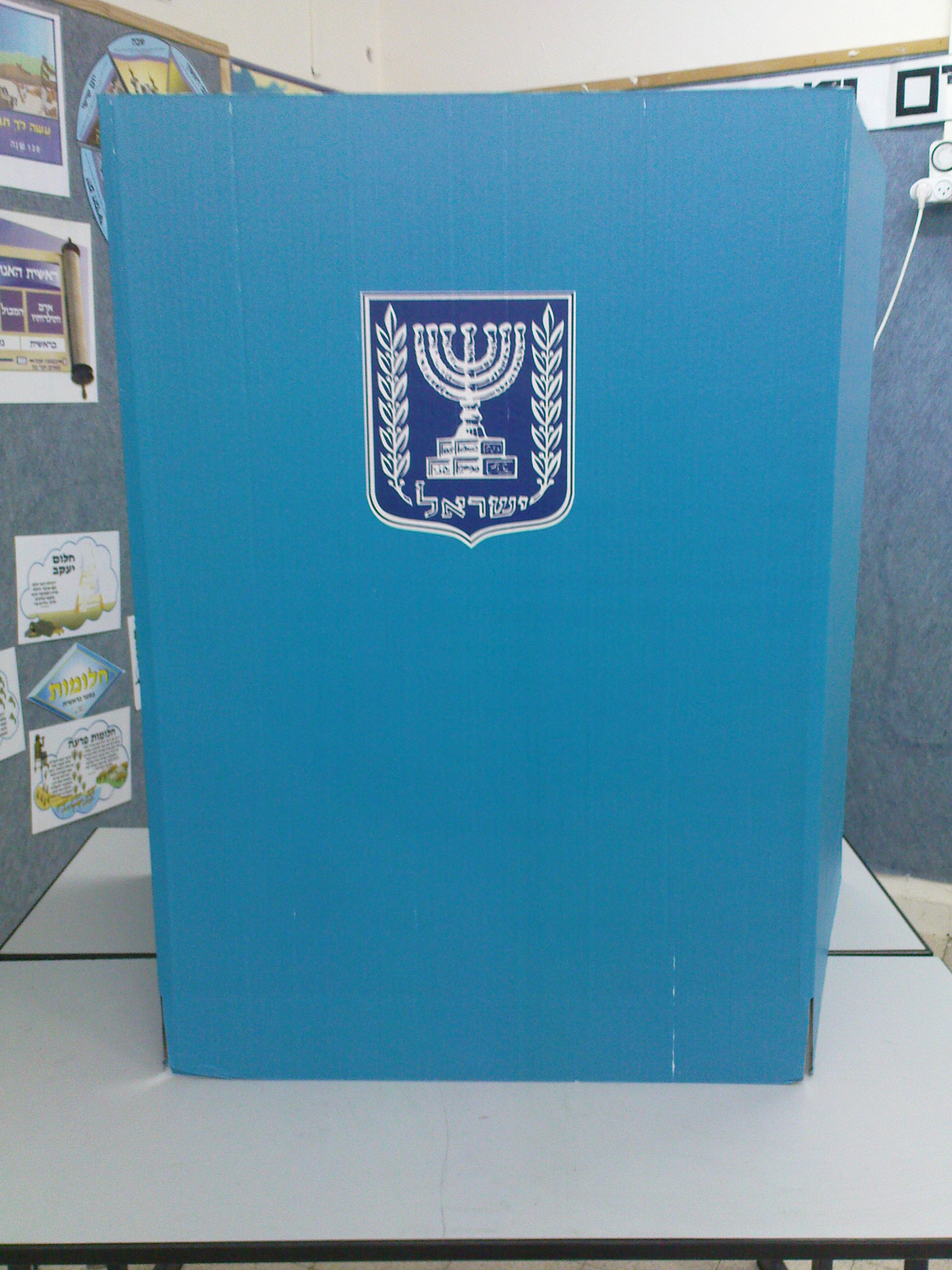
A privacy divider to ensure ballot secrecy

Legislative elections were held in Israel on 10 February 2009 to elect the 120 members of the eighteenth Knesset. These elections became necessary due to the resignation of Prime Minister Ehud Olmert as leader of the Kadima party, and the failure of his successor, Tzipi Livni, to form a coalition government. Had Olmert remained in office or had Livni formed a coalition government, the elections would have been scheduled for 2010 instead.

Although the incumbent prime minister's party, Kadima, won the most seats in the parliament, the Likud leader Benjamin Netanyahu was able to form a majority coalition government and become the new prime minister. This was the first election in Israeli history in which the Israeli Labor Party or its predecessors did not win the most or second-most seats.

== Background ==
On 17 September 2008, Kadima held a leadership election, which was won by Tzipi Livni. Following Livni's victory, former party leader Ehud Olmert (who did not run in the contest) resigned as prime minister. Livni was given six weeks to form a coalition, but set a deadline of 26 October for parties to agree to join the new government.

Although the Labor Party agreed to join, current coalition member Shas rejected the opportunity; Livni claimed that it had made "economically and diplomatically illegitimate" demands (including a reluctance to increase child benefits, and rejection of the possible division of Jerusalem in a deal with the Palestinians). It was reported that Shas had rejected almost one billion shekels in child allowances offered to it as part of the coalition negotiations. Gil and United Torah Judaism had both rejected offers to join, while negotiations with Meretz-Yachad were still ongoing. On 26 October, Livni recommended to President Shimon Peres that early elections be held.

President Peres had three days to consult on the recommendation, after which there was a period of three weeks in which other Knesset members could have offered to form an alternative coalition, but no such alternative was brought.

The election would have to be held within 90 days after the end of that period. Although Kadima submitted a bill to the Knesset on 27 October to call early elections and bypass the three-week period, Peres' announcement to the Knesset that there was no chance of forming a government meant that the full waiting period stood. Ehud Olmert was to remain the caretaker prime minister until a new government was formed after the elections.

The traditional distinction between the Israeli left and the right had become blurred, with both the voters and the main candidates gravitating toward the center. Israelis, who had always been highly politicized, were switching affiliations more easily. On the Palestinian front, stark differences among the parties still remained. Kadima was committed to continuing talks for a two-state solution. Labor did not believe that bilateral Israeli–Palestinian negotiations could succeed under the current circumstances, and advocated a more comprehensive, regional approach to peace. Likud said it would promote an "economic peace" with the Palestinians and also hold political negotiations, although it was not clear about what.

== Procedures ==
Elections to the Knesset allocate 120 seats by party-list proportional representation, using the D'Hondt method. The election threshold for the 2006 election was set at 2% (up from 1.5% in previous elections), which is a little over two seats.

After official results are published, the president delegates the task of forming a government to the member of Knesset with the best chance of assembling a majority coalition (usually the leader of the largest party, but not required). That member has up to 42 days to negotiate with the different parties, and then present the government to the Knesset for a vote of confidence. Once the government is approved (by a vote of at least 61 members), the leader becomes prime minister.

== Parliament factions ==
The table below lists the parliamentary factions represented in the 17th Knesset.

| Name | Ideology | Symbol | Leader | 2006 result | | Seats at 2008 dissolution |
| Name | Ideology | Symbol | Leader | Votes (%) | Seats | Seats at 2008 dissolution |
|---|---|---|---|---|---|---|
| Kadima | Liberalism | כן | Tzipi Livni | 22.02% | 29 / 120 | 29 / 120 |
| Labor | Social democracy | אמת | Ehud Barak | 15.06% | 19 / 120 | 19 / 120 |
| Shas | Religious conservatism | שס | Eli Yishai | 9.53% | 12 / 120 | 12 / 120 |
| Likud | National liberalism | מחל | Benjamin Netanyahu | 8.99% | 12 / 120 | 12 / 120 |
| Yisrael Beiteinu | Nationalism; Secularism | ל | Avigdor Lieberman | 8.99% | 11 / 120 | 11 / 120 |
| National Union-NRP | Religious Zionism; National conservatism | טב | Yaakov Katz | 7.14% | 9 / 120 | 9 / 120 |
| Gil | Pensioners' interests | זך | Rafi Eitan | 5.92% | 7 / 120 | 7 / 120 |
| UTJ | Religious conservatism | ג | Yaakov Litzman | 4.69% | 6 / 120 | 6 / 120 |
| Meretz | Progressivism; Secularism | מרצ | Haim Oron | 3.77% | 5 / 120 | 5 / 120 |
| Ra'am-Ta'al | Arab nationalism Islamism | עם | Ibrahim Sarsur | 3.02% | 4 / 120 | 4 / 120 |
| Hadash | Communism; Socialism | ו | Mohammad Barakeh | 2.74% | 3 / 120 | 3 / 120 |
| Balad | Palestinian nationalism | ד | Jamal Zahalka | 2.30% | 3 / 120 | 3 / 120 |

== Parties ==
By 23 December 2008, a record 43 parties had registered with the parties registrar, compared to 31 for the 2006 elections, although in the end, only 34 parties submitted a list of candidates, and only 33 ran on election day. On 12 January 2009, Balad and the United Arab List–Ta'al alliance were disqualified by the Central Elections Committee on the grounds that they failed to recognize Israel as a Jewish state and called for armed conflict against it. Balad and Ta'al were also disqualified from the 2003 election, but won a Supreme Court case which allowed them to run. On 21 January 2009, the Supreme Court again revoked the ban.

=== Alliances ===
The Labor–Meimad alliance, in existence since 1999, was ended prior to the elections. Labor ran on its own, and Meimad ran a joint list with the new Green Movement.

Meretz and Tnu'a HaHadasha, a new movement of left-wing activists led by Tzali Reshef, ran a joint list, with Tnua'a HaHadasha representatives getting third, seventh, and eleventh spots on the alliance's list.

The anti-West Bank barrier movement Tarabut was merged into Hadash.

The religious Zionist Ahi party, previously part of the National Union alliance, merged into Likud in late December 2008. Ultra-Orthodox parties Agudat Israel and Degel HaTorah agreed to continue their alliance, United Torah Judaism, for the election.

=== New parties ===
Several political parties had been established since the 2006 elections. The first was Social Justice, founded by billionaire Arcadi Gaydamak in February 2007 (which in the end did not run in the election), and Yisrael Hazaka was established by the former Labor member of the Knesset, Efraim Sneh, in May 2008.

After the announcement of elections in late October 2008, the Tkuma and Moledet factions of the National Union and the National Religious Party merged into a single party in early November 2008, which was later named The Jewish Home. However, the National Union was re-established after the Moledet and Tkuma factions broke away from the party and agreed to an alliance with Hatikva headed by Aryeh Eldad and Eretz Yisrael Shelanu (Our Land of Israel) headed by Rabbi Sholom Dov Wolpo and Baruch Marzel.

Member of the Knesset Abbas Zakour left the United Arab List to establish the Arab Centre Party in early December 2008. However, he later joined the Balad list.

== Opinion polls ==
| Source | Date | Kadima | Labor Party | Shas | Likud | Yisrael Beiteinu | Jewish Home | National Union | Gil | UTJ | Meretz | Ra'am–Ta'al | Hadash | Balad | Greens |
|---|---|---|---|---|---|---|---|---|---|---|---|---|---|---|---|
| Election result | 10 Feb | 29 | 19 | 12 | 12 | 11 | 9 | | 7 | 6 | 5 | 4 | 3 | 3 | 0 |
| Dahaf | 27 Oct | 29 | 11 | 11 | 26 | 9 | 7 | | 2 | 7 | 6 | 10 | | | 2 |
| Teleseker | 27 Oct | 31 | 11 | 8 | 29 | 11 | 7 | | 0 | 4 | 5 | 11 | | | 3 |
| Gal Hadash | 30 Oct | 30 | 13 | 10 | 31 | 8 | 6 | | 0 | 5 | 5 | 10 | | | 2 |
| Gal Hadash | 13 Nov | 28 | 11 | 10 | 33 | 7 | 6 | | 0 | 5 | 7 | 10 | | | 3 |
| Dialog | 20 Nov | 28 | 10 | 10 | 34 | 10 | 4 | | 0 | 6 | 7 | 11 | | | 0 |
| Dahaf | 20 Nov | 26 | 8 | 11 | 32 | 9 | 6 | | 0 | 7 | 7 | 11 | | | 3 |
| Shvakim Panorama | 15 Dec | 20 | 14 | 12 | 34 | 11 | 4 | | 0 | 7 | 6 | 9 | | | 0 |
| Teleseker | 19 Dec | 30 | 12 | 9 | 30 | 12 | 5 | | 0 | 5 | 7 | 10 | | | 0 |
| Dialog | 25 Dec | 26 | 11 | 13 | 30 | 11 | 6 | | 2 | 5 | 8 | 3 | 3 | 2 | – |
| Dialog | 31 Dec | 27 | 16 | 9 | 32 | 11 | 3 | | – | 5 | 7 | 4 | 4 | 2 | – |
| Reshet Bet | 15 Jan | 21 | 15 | 10 | 28 | 15 | 3 | 3 | 0 | 7 | 5 | 4 | 3 | 3 | 3 |
| Panels | 22 Jan | 24 | 15 | 10 | 30 | 15 | 2 | 4 | – | 5 | 6 | 4 | 3 | 2 | – |
| Dialog | 29 Jan | 25 | 14 | 10 | 28 | 15 | 3 | 4 | 2 | 5 | 5 | 4 | 3 | 2 | – |
| Midgam | 3 Feb | 23 | 17 | 10 | 28 | 18 | 4 | 3 | – | 5 | 4 | 2 | 4 | 2 | – |
| Teleseker | 4 Feb | 23 | 17 | 10 | 27 | 17 | 3 | 4 | – | 5 | 6 | 4 | 4 | 0 | – |
| Shvakim Panorama | 5 Feb | 21 | 16 | 11 | 25 | 16 | 4 | 4 | 2 | 7 | 5 | 3 | 4 | 2 | – |
| Panels | 5 Feb | 25 | 14 | 10 | 26 | 18 | 3 | 4 | – | 5 | 6 | 3 | 4 | 2 | – |
| Dahaf | 6 Feb | 23 | 16 | 10 | 25 | 19 | 3 | 4 | – | 6 | 5 | 4 | 3 | 2 | – |
| Dialog | 6 Feb | 25 | 14 | 9 | 27 | 18 | 2 | 4 | – | 6 | 7 | 3 | 3 | 2 | – |

== Results ==
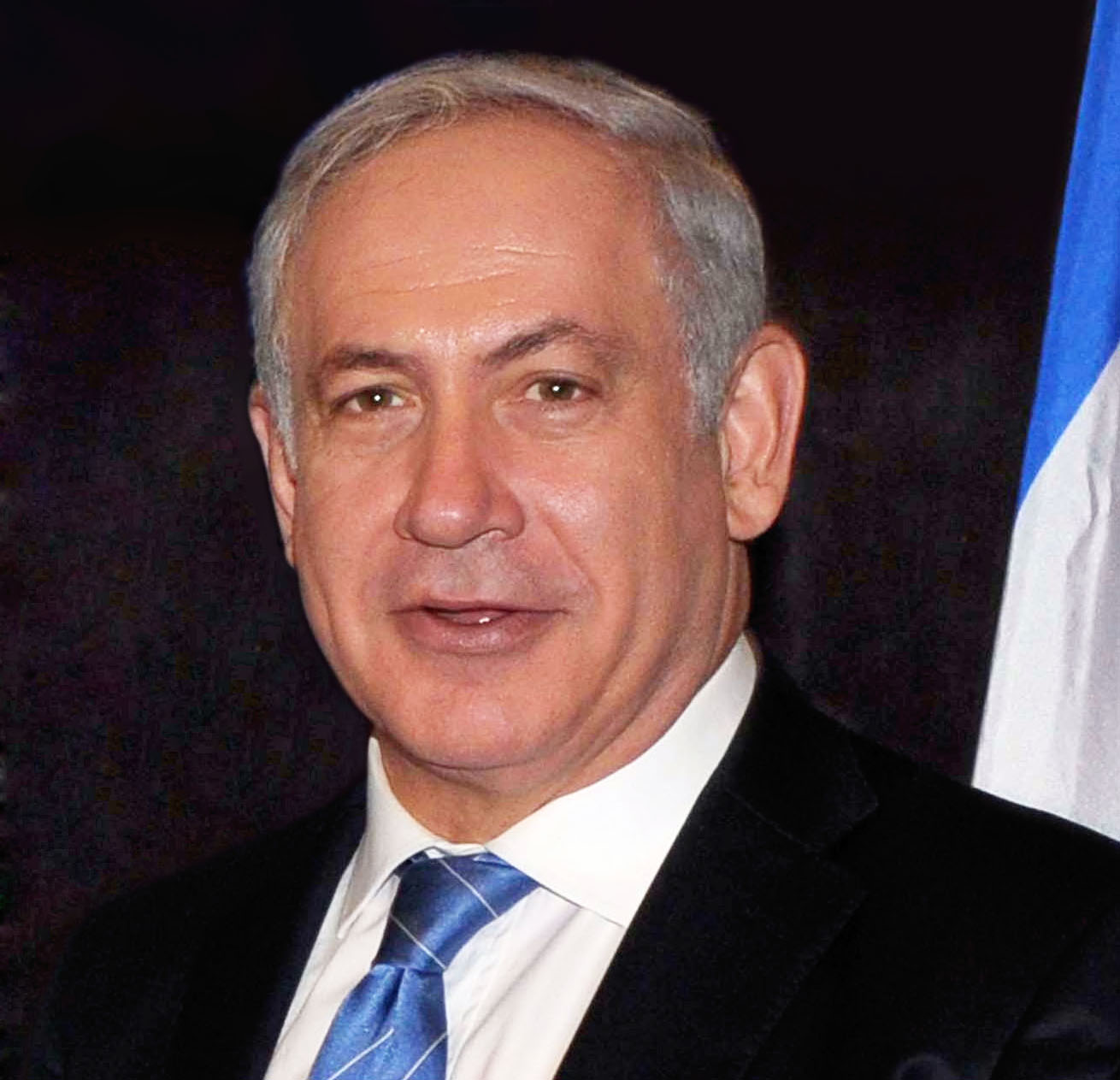
The Likud Party chairman Benjamin Netanyahu. Although the Likud party placed second in the 2009 elections, the right-wing parties won a majority; thus, Netanyahu managed to form a coalition government after the elections, and thus became the new Prime Minister.

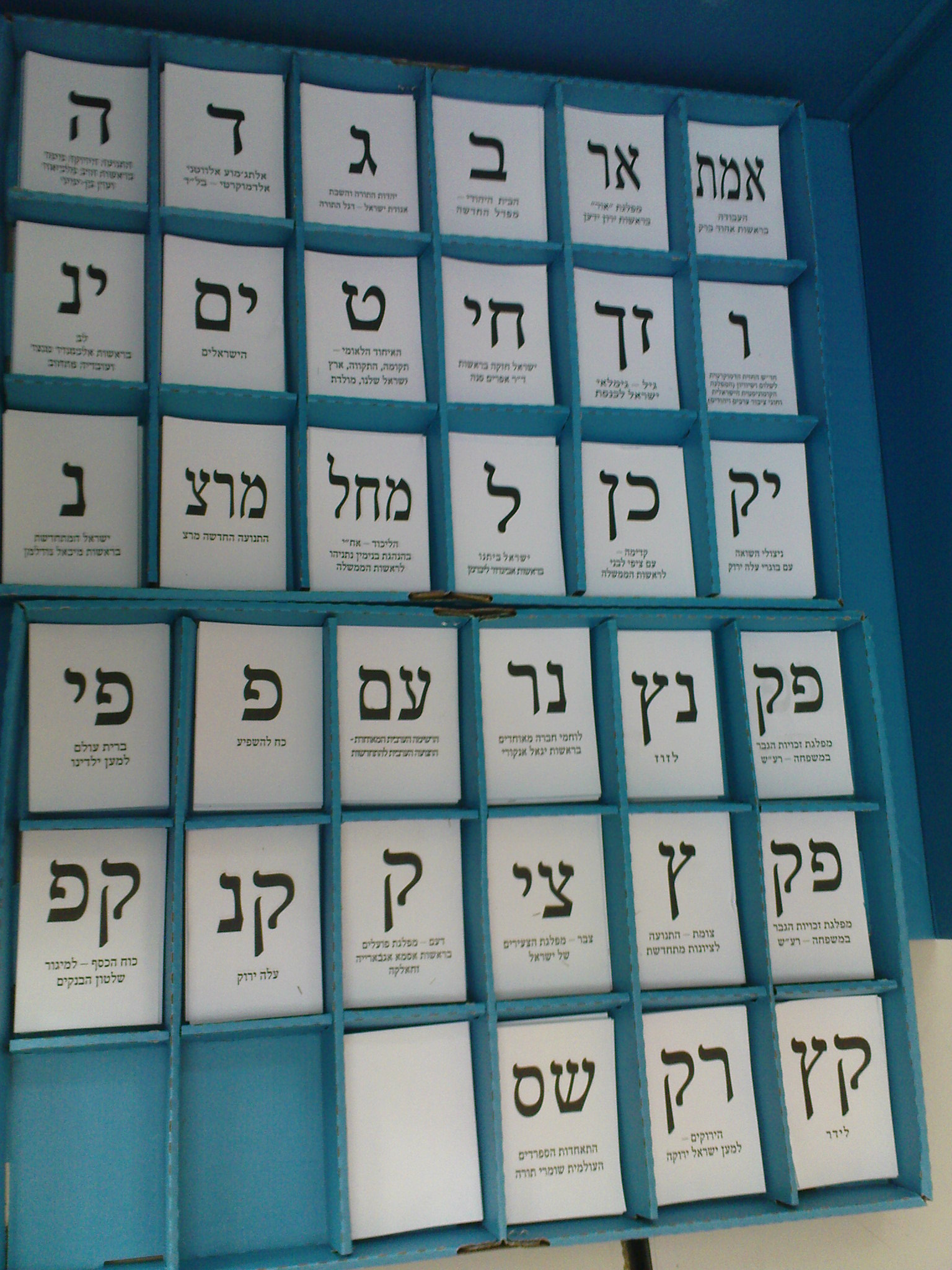
Ballot papers

| Party | Votes | % | Seats | +/– |
|---|---|---|---|---|
| Kadima | 758,032 | 22.47 | 28 | −1 |
| Likud | 729,054 | 21.61 | 27 | +15 |
| Yisrael Beiteinu | 394,577 | 11.70 | 15 | +4 |
| Labor Party | 334,900 | 9.93 | 13 | –6 |
| Shas | 286,300 | 8.49 | 11 | –1 |
| United Torah Judaism | 147,954 | 4.39 | 5 | –1 |
| United Arab List–Ta'al | 113,954 | 3.38 | 4 | 0 |
| National Union | 112,570 | 3.34 | 4 | 0 |
| Hadash | 112,130 | 3.32 | 4 | +1 |
| New Movement-Meretz | 99,611 | 2.95 | 3 | –2 |
| The Jewish Home | 96,765 | 2.87 | 3 | 0 |
| Balad | 83,739 | 2.48 | 3 | 0 |
| The Green Movement–Meimad | 27,737 | 0.82 | 0 | –1 |
| Gil | 17,571 | 0.52 | 0 | –7 |
| Ale Yarok | 13,132 | 0.39 | 0 | 0 |
| The Greens | 12,378 | 0.37 | 0 | 0 |
| Yisrael Hazaka | 6,722 | 0.20 | 0 | New |
| Tzabar | 4,752 | 0.14 | 0 | New |
| Koah LeHashpi'a | 3,696 | 0.11 | 0 | New |
| Da'am Workers Party | 2,645 | 0.08 | 0 | 0 |
| Yisrael HaMithadeshet | 2,572 | 0.08 | 0 | New |
| Holocaust Survivors and Grown-Up Green Leaf Party | 2,346 | 0.07 | 0 | New |
| Leader | 1,887 | 0.06 | 0 | 0 |
| Tzomet | 1,520 | 0.05 | 0 | 0 |
| Koah HaKesef | 1,008 | 0.03 | 0 | 0 |
| Man's Rights in the Family Party | 921 | 0.03 | 0 | 0 |
| HaYisraelim | 856 | 0.03 | 0 | New |
| Or | 815 | 0.02 | 0 | New |
| Ahrayut | 802 | 0.02 | 0 | New |
| Brit Olam | 678 | 0.02 | 0 | 0 |
| Lev LaOlim | 632 | 0.02 | 0 | 0 |
| Lazuz | 623 | 0.02 | 0 | New |
| Lehem | 611 | 0.02 | 0 | New |
| Total | 3,373,490 | 100.00 | 120 | 0 |
| Valid votes | 3,373,490 | 98.74 | | |
| Invalid/blank votes | 43,097 | 1.26 | | |
| Total votes | 3,416,587 | 100.00 | | |
| Registered voters/turnout | 5,278,985 | 64.72 | | |
Source: Knesset Board of Elections

== Government formation ==
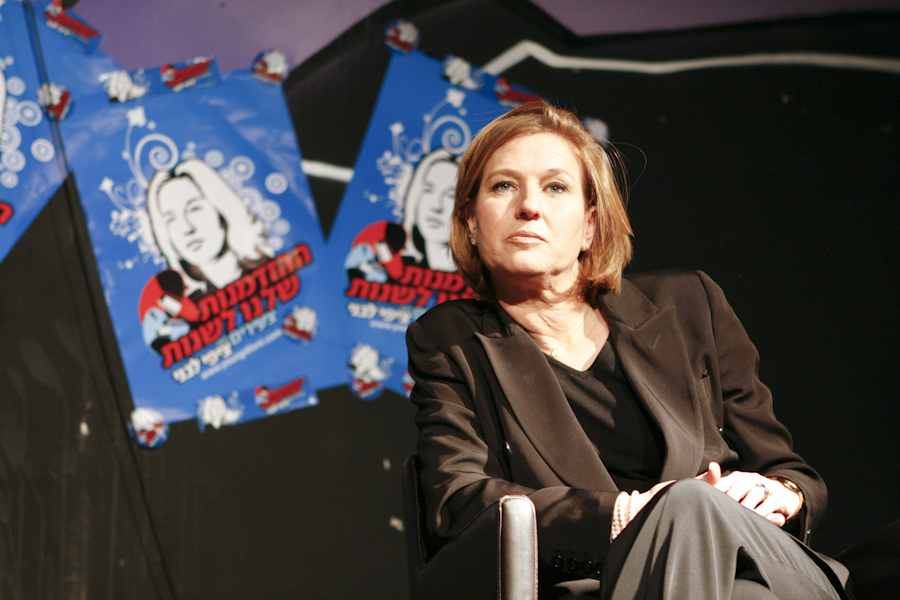
Former Kadima party chairwoman Tzipi Livni. Although Kadima won the most seats in the 2009 elections under her leadership, it became an opposition party.

On 20 February, President Shimon Peres announced that Likud's Benjamin Netanyahu would be given the task of forming a government. This is the first time in which the president had not appointed the head of the largest party for this task, although there had already been several cases in which the Prime Minister was not the head of the largest party. Such a case occurred in the 1996 elections, when Netanyahu himself was elected Prime Minister by direct vote, although his Likud party won fewer seats than Shimon Peres's Labor party. Peres's motivation in nominating Netanyahu was likely based upon the judgement that Netanyahu was in a better position numerically to put together a coalition. Likud's potential partners on the political right won more seats than the parties of the centre-left, who would more likely support Kadima.

Labor and Kadima initially stated they would not join a Likud-led government, although both parties scheduled further talks. Polls at the time showed that the public supported a national unity government between Likud and Kadima, with either Yisrael Beiteinu or Labor as the third senior coalition member.

On 16 March 2009, Netanyahu signed a coalition agreement with Yisrael Beitenu. Following an extension of the coalition negotiation deadline from 20 March to 3 April 2009, he then signed a coalition agreement with Shas on 22 March 2009, and on 24 March 2009, he secured the support of the Labor Party, with Labor's central committee approving the deal by 680 votes to 507. However, large parts of the party remained sceptical, accusing Ehud Barak of only being interested in his own benefits under the deal. On 25 March, the Jewish Home also joined the coalition.

On 30 March, in accordance with the Israeli Basic Law, Netanyahu informed Peres and acting Knesset speaker, Michael Eitan, that he was able to form a government and the Knesset was set to convene on 31 March 2009, in order to vote on the government in a "Vote of Confidence" and to be sworn in thereafter. The country's 32nd government was approved that day by a majority of 69 lawmakers, with United Torah Judaism joining the following day, expanding the coalition to 74 MKs.

=== Unity Government 2012 ===
On 27 March 2012, the opposition party Kadima held leadership primaries, pitting its leader Tzipi Livni against Shaul Mofaz. Mofaz won with 62% of the vote. Livni resigned from the Knesset in May 2012.

Earlier, Netanyahu defeated his rival Moshe Feiglin, winning 77% of the vote in the primaries for the Likud leadership held on 31 January 2012.

On the eve of 7 May 2012, after weeks of deliberation and rumours, Netanyahu called for an early general national election and proposed 4 September as the election day, a notion which seemed inevitable—but in a dramatic turn of events, that very night, he announced that he had forged a unity government with the Kadima Party, effectively retracting the earlier call for early elections. The next afternoon, Likud and Kadima signed a coalition agreement placing Kadima's 28 Knesset members in the government, with Mofaz appointed as Active Vice Premier (in case of Netanyahu's absence) and Minister Without Portfolio. This agreement bolstered the government to the widest government in Israel's history, with a coalition of 94 seats and an opposition of only 26. However, on 17 July, Kadima voted to pull out of the coalition—which, all the same, retained a majority of seats even without that party. The reduced coalition was now divided between nationalist groups, such as Yisrael Beiteinu, and Haredi groups, such as Shas, which are on opposite sides of the universal draft issue. This led some commentators to suggest that the coalition's complete break-up was imminent, and that new elections would take place by January 2013.

== See also ==
- List of members of the eighteenth Knesset
- 2008 Israeli Labor Party primary
