= 2024 Tel Aviv municipal election =

Tel Aviv Municipal Election

- February 27, 2024
- Mayoral election
- Turnout: 42.18%
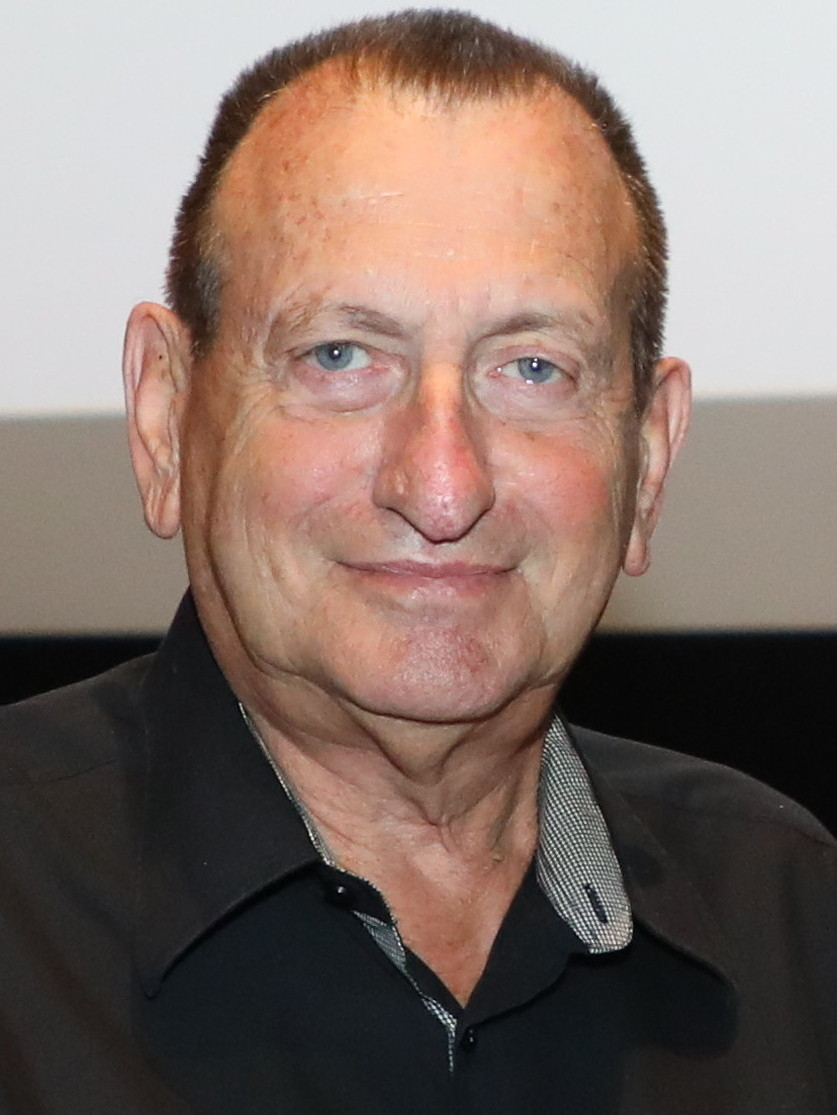

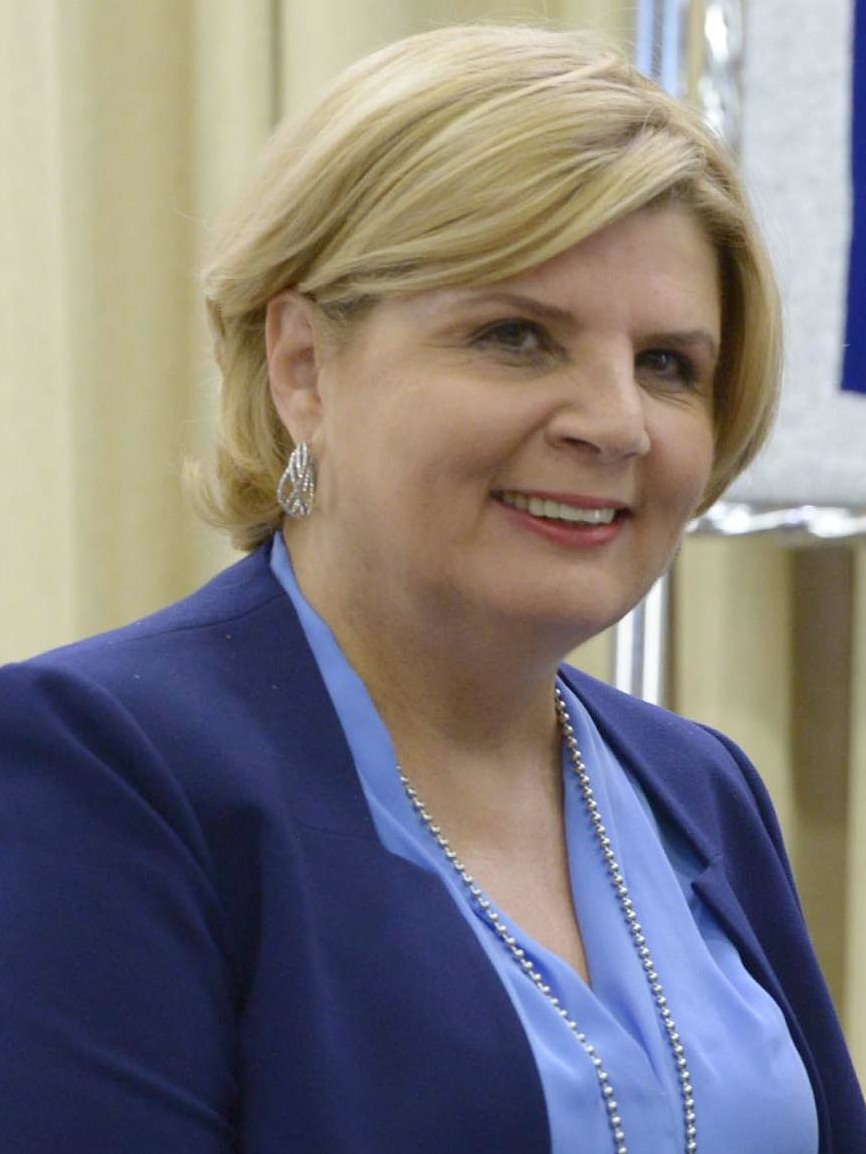

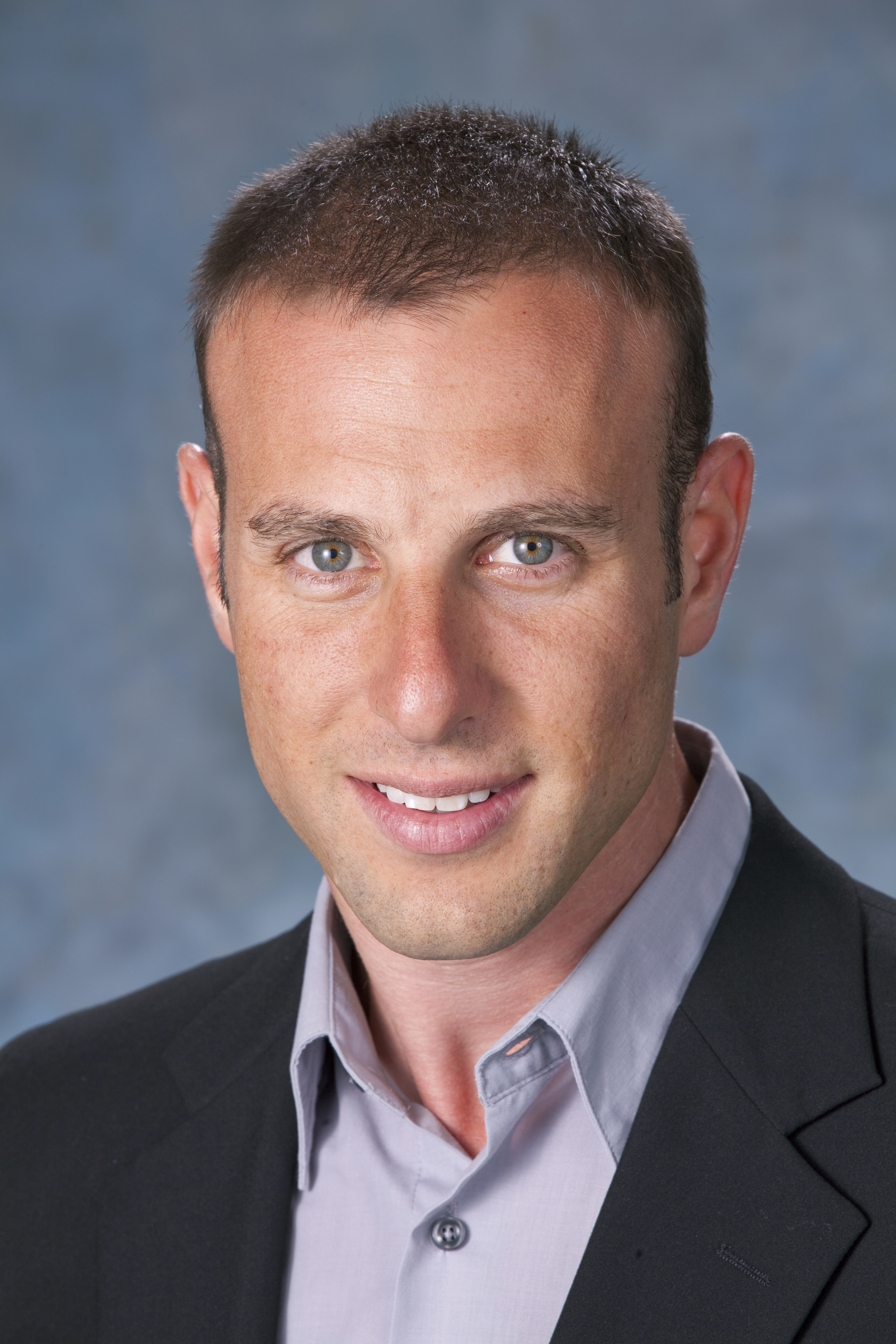
Candidate	Ron Huldai	Orna Barbivai	Yuval Zellner
Party	One Tel Aviv	Yesh Atid	New Hope
Popular vote	95,578	69,133	20,284
Percentage	51.67%	37.37%	10.96%
Mayor before election
Ron Huldai
One Tel Aviv
Elected mayor
Ron Huldai
One Tel Aviv
- City council election
- Turnout: 42.18%
Party	Leader	Vote %	Seats	+/–
One Tel Aviv	Ron Huldai	20.91	7	0
Yesh Atid	Orna Barbivai	18.09	6	+5
Meretz	Mital Lehavi	16.44	5	+2
We Are All The City	Amir Badran	7.65	3	−1
Secular Greens	Reuven Ladiansky	6.10	2	0
Shas	Elhanan Zebulon	5.38	2	0
Believers in Tel Aviv	Chaim Goren	4.66	2	0
Likud	Dudu Lanidao	4.43	1	0
Power to the Pensioners	Natan Voloch	4.27	1	−1
New Hope	Yuval Zellner	3.92	1	+1
The Youth Faction	Chen Kraus	2.66	1	−1
This lists parties that won seats. See the complete results below.

The 2024 Tel Aviv municipal election was held on February 27, 2024. Originally scheduled for October 31, 2023, the elections were delayed due to the Gaza war to elect the mayor of Tel Aviv. The election was part of the 2024 Israeli municipal elections. Campaign issues included the increasing cost of living, the local real estate market and high housing costs, frequent traffic jams, the construction and delayed opening of the Tel Aviv Light Rail, and public transportation on Shabbat.

== Candidates ==
=== Declared candidates ===
Candidate	Photo	Occupation	References
Ron Huldai		incumbent mayor	
Orna Barbivai		member of the Knesset and former Minister of Economy	
Yuval Zellner		former member of the Knesset	

=== Candidates that withdrew ===
- Amos Shapira, former President of Cellcom, El Al and the University of Haifa Withdrew from race on August 20, 2023, supporting Barbivai.
- Asaf Zamir, former Minister of Tourism and former deputy mayor of Tel Aviv. He announced on August 28 that he was joining forces with Huldai.
- Tzipi Brand, deputy mayor of Tel Aviv, joined Orna Barbivai.
- Reuven Ladiansky, city councillor and former deputy mayor of Tel Aviv.
- Amir Badran, Member of Tel Aviv-Yafo Municipality Council, first Arab candidate for Mayor position

== Polling ==
Date	Polling firm	Sample Size	Margin of error	Vote share								
Date	Polling firm	Sample Size	Margin of error	Amos Shapira	Orna Barbivai	Ron Huldai	Reuven Ladiansky	Yuval Zellner	Tzipi Brand	Amir Badran	Undecided	Will not vote
27-29 June 2023	Midgam	504	±4.4%	5%	22%	29%	2%	5%	8%	–	29%	
2-5 February 2024	Lazar	450	±4.6%	–	30%	36%	–	5%	–	1%	28%	

== Results ==
=== Mayoral ===
Candidate	Party	Votes	%
Ron Huldai	One Tel Aviv	95,578	51.67
Orna Barbivai	Yesh Atid	69,133	37.37
Yuval Zellner	New Hope	20,284	10.96
Total		184,995	100.00
Valid votes		184,995	93.72
Invalid/blank votes		12,406	6.28
Total votes		197,401	100.00
Registered voters/turnout		468,052	42.18
Source: Reshumot, timeout.co.il

=== City council ===
Party	Leader	Votes	%	Seats	+/–
One Tel Aviv	Ron Huldai	40,692	20.91	7	0
Yesh Atid and the Tel Avivians	Orna Barbivai	35,199	18.09	6	+5
Meretz Tel Aviv-Yafo-New Contract-Greens-Center	Mital Lehavi	31,994	16.44	5	+2
We Are All The City	Amir Badran	14,882	7.65	3	-1
Secular Greens	Reuven Ladiansky	11,865	6.10	2	0
Shas	Elhanan Zabulon	10,469	5.38	2	0
Believers in Tel Aviv	Chaim Goren	9,060	4.66	2	0
Likud	Dudu Lanidao	8,620	4.43	1	0
Power to the Pensioners	Natan Voloch	8,310	4.27	1	-1
New Hope	Yuval Zellner	7,629	3.92	1	–
The Youth Faction	Chen Kraus	5,185	2.66	1	-1
Citizens of the City	Sigal Weizmann	4,690	2.41	0	–
Voice of the City	Nehama Goldoser	4,154	2.13	0	–
The Equal List	Linor Abergel	1,278	0.66	0	–
Freedom	Aharon Maduel	599	0.31	0	–
Total		194,626	100.00	31	–
Valid votes		194,626	98.57		
Invalid/blank votes		2,820	1.43		
Total votes		197,446	100.00		
Registered voters/turnout		468,052	42.18		
Source: Reshumot, City of Tel Aviv, timeout.co.il

== Gallery ==
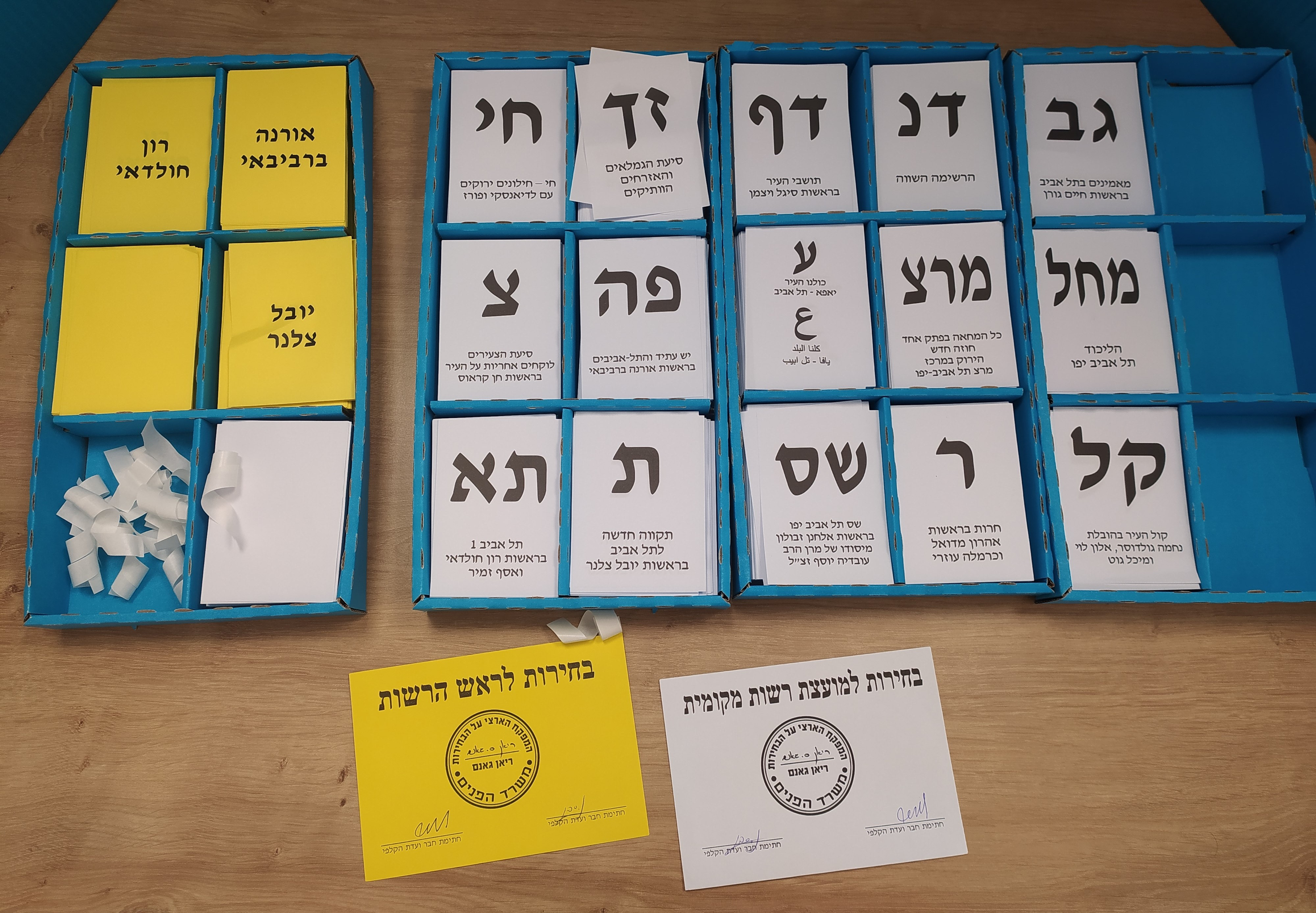
Election ballots for the 2024 municipal elections in Tel Aviv

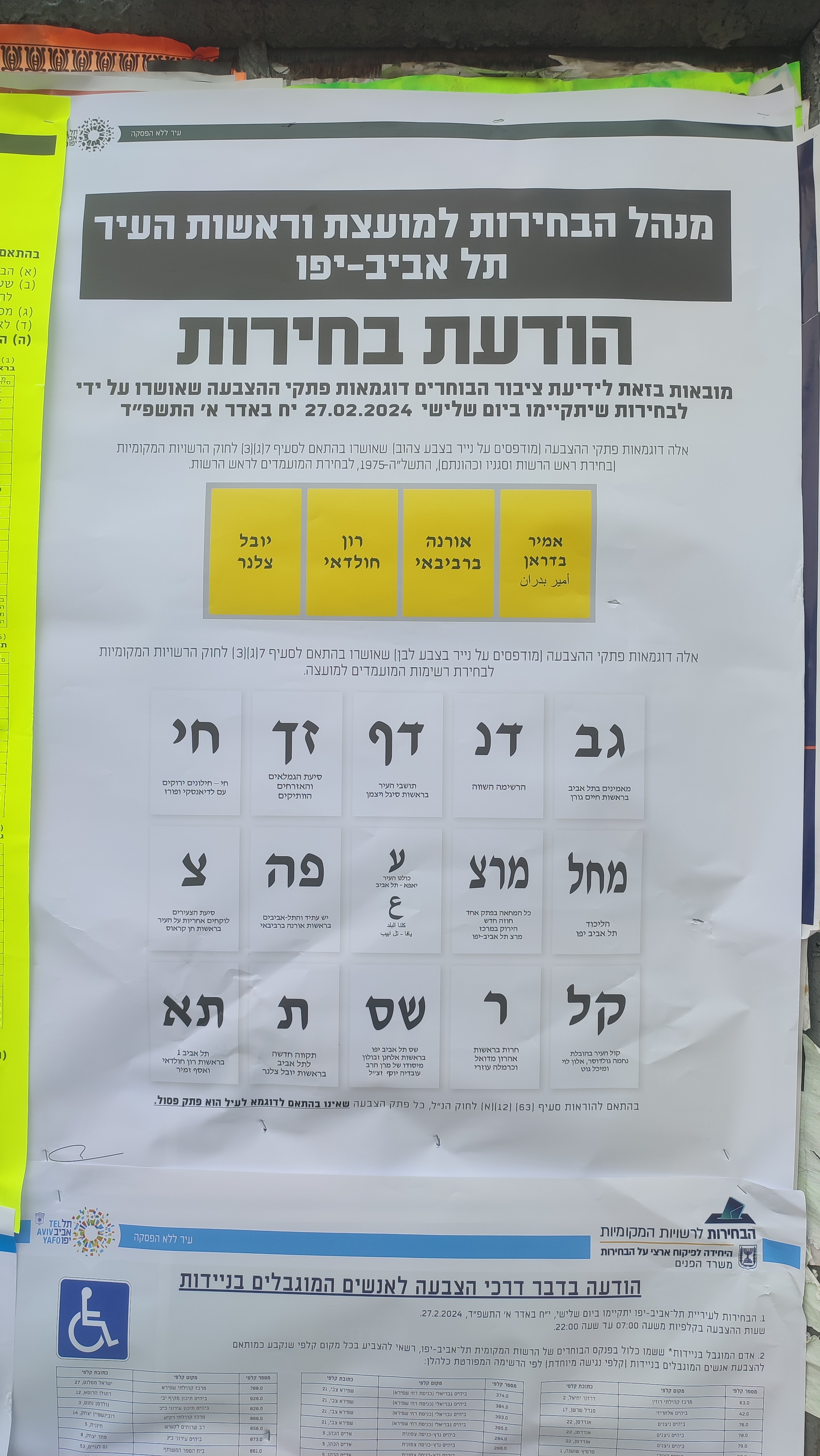
Poster for the 2024 municipal elections

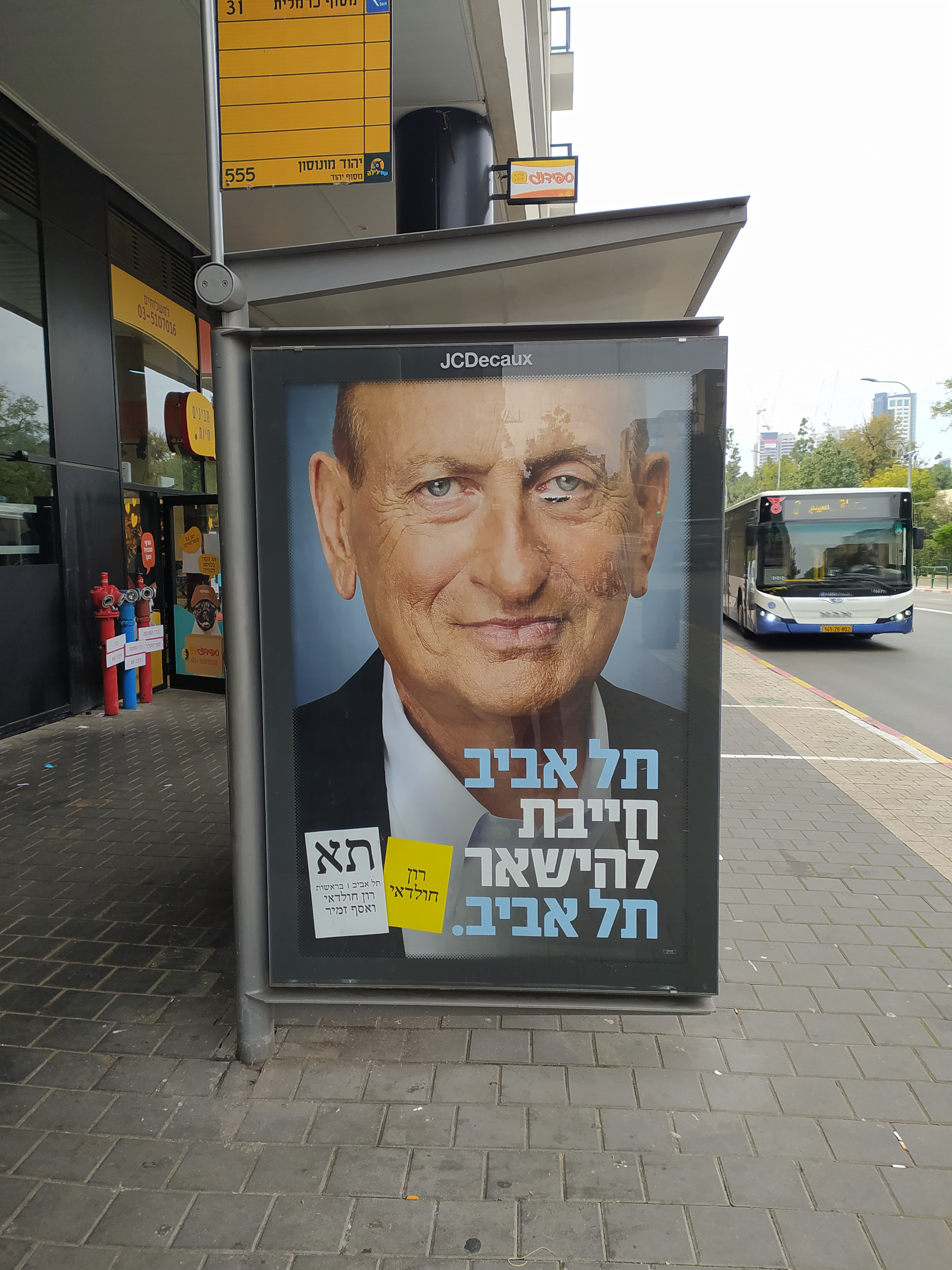
Ron Huldai

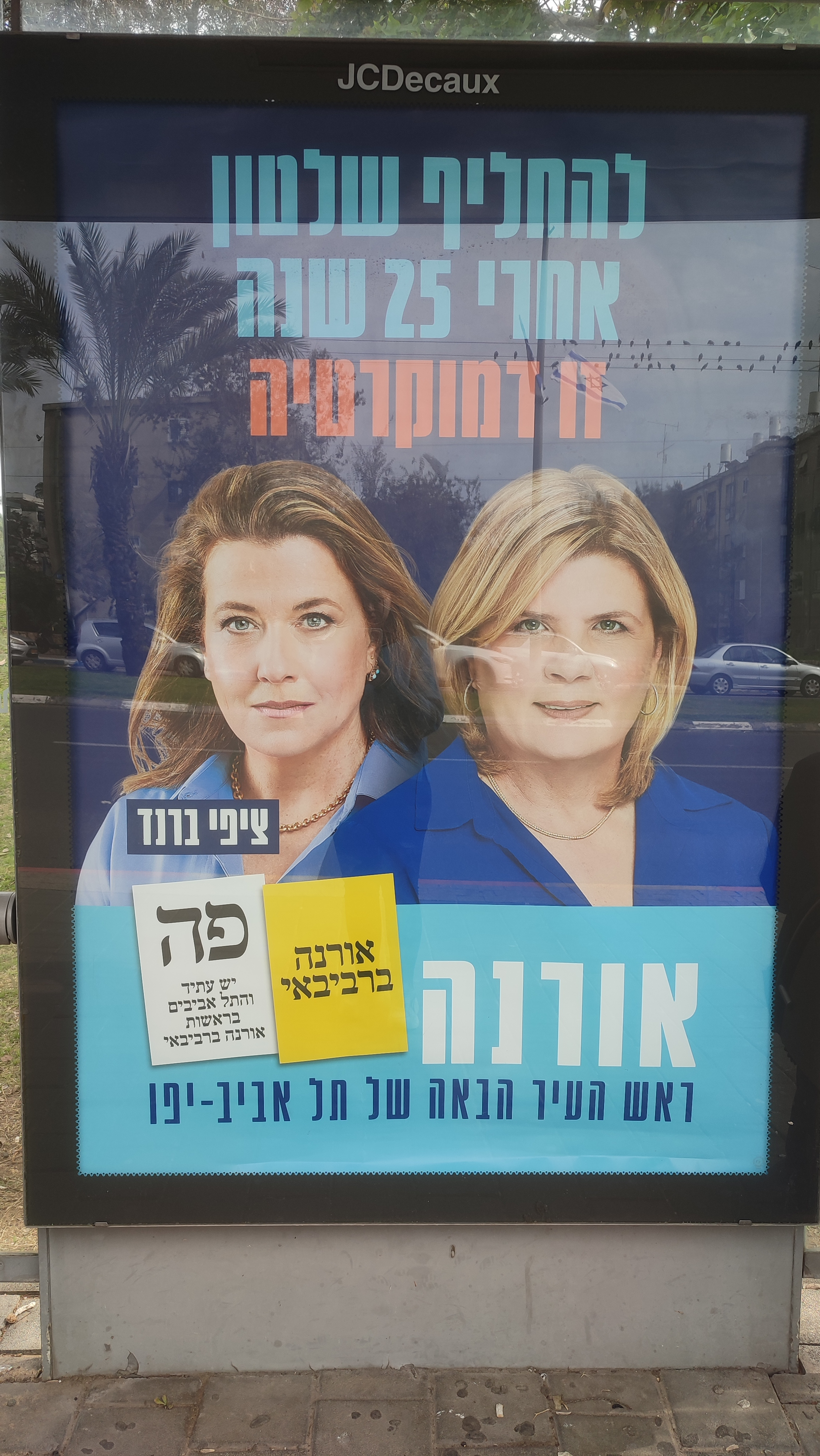
Orna Barbivai
