= 2015 Kadima leadership election =

Israeli political party election

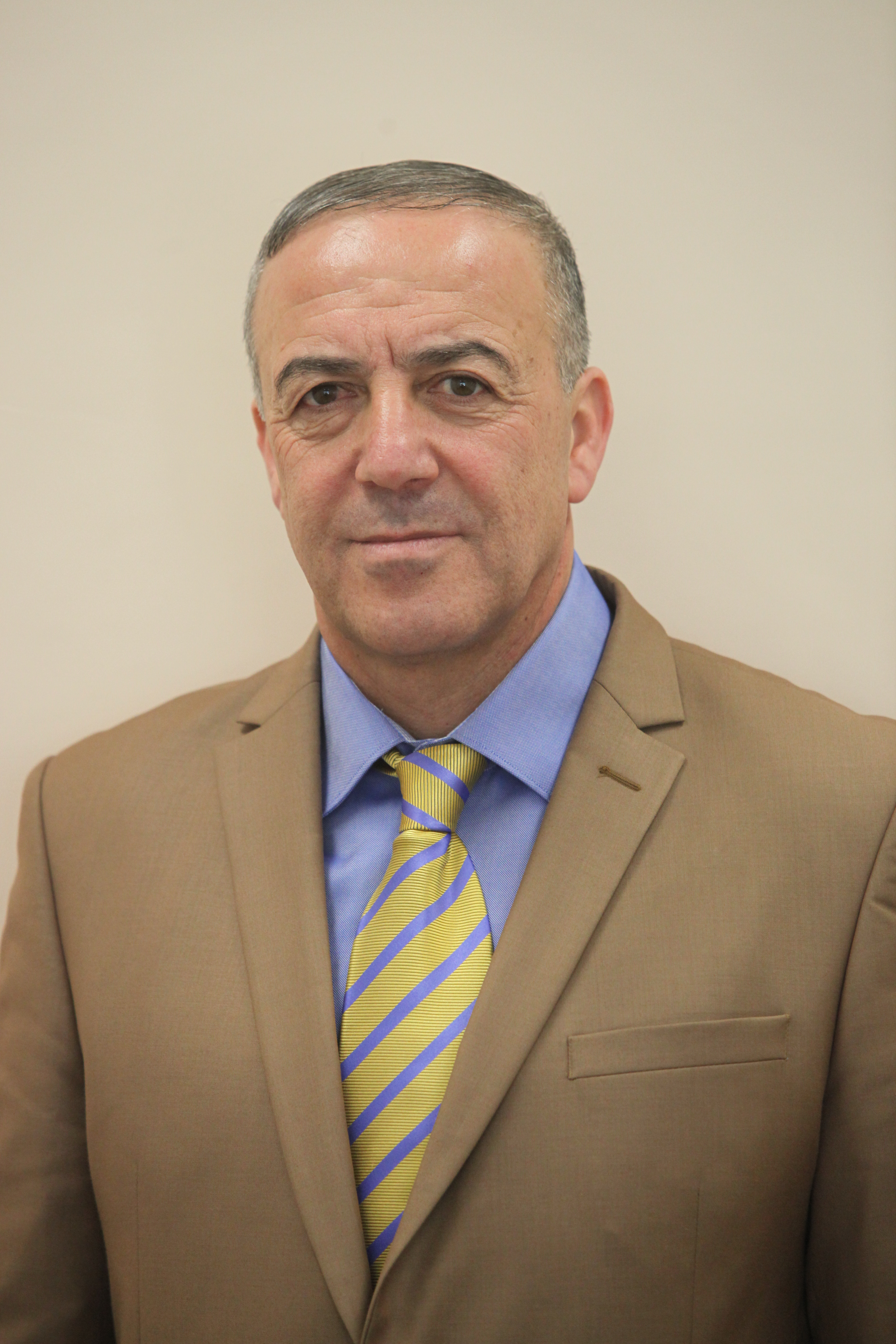
Candidate	Akram Hasson
Popular vote	elected
Leader before election
Shaul Mofaz
Elected Leader
Akram Hasson

The 2015 Kadima leadership election was held to elect the leader of the Kadima party. The election took place three months before the 2015 Israeli legislative election. It saw the election of Akram Hasson, who would only serve for two days before quitting the party. Hasson's brief tenure as leader made him the first Druze to lead a prominent Jewish political party in Israel.

== Election details ==
After the Kadima party leadership decided it would not join the Zionist Union coalition in the 2015 Israeli legislative election, party leader Shaul Mofaz announced on 27 January that he would retire from politics, triggering a vote to succeed him. The vote was held that same day, selecting Akram Hasson as party leader. This made Hasson the first Druze ever elected to lead a prominent Jewish political party in Israel.

== Aftermath ==
Hasson's leadership of the party was incredibly short lived. Two days after being voted the party's leader he departed to join the new Kulanu list for the 2015 elections, being placed twelfth on that party's electoral list. Kadima ultimately opted not to contest in the 2015 legislative elections.
