= Orna Barbivai =

1st Female Maj. Gen. in Israeli Army

- אורנה ברביבאי
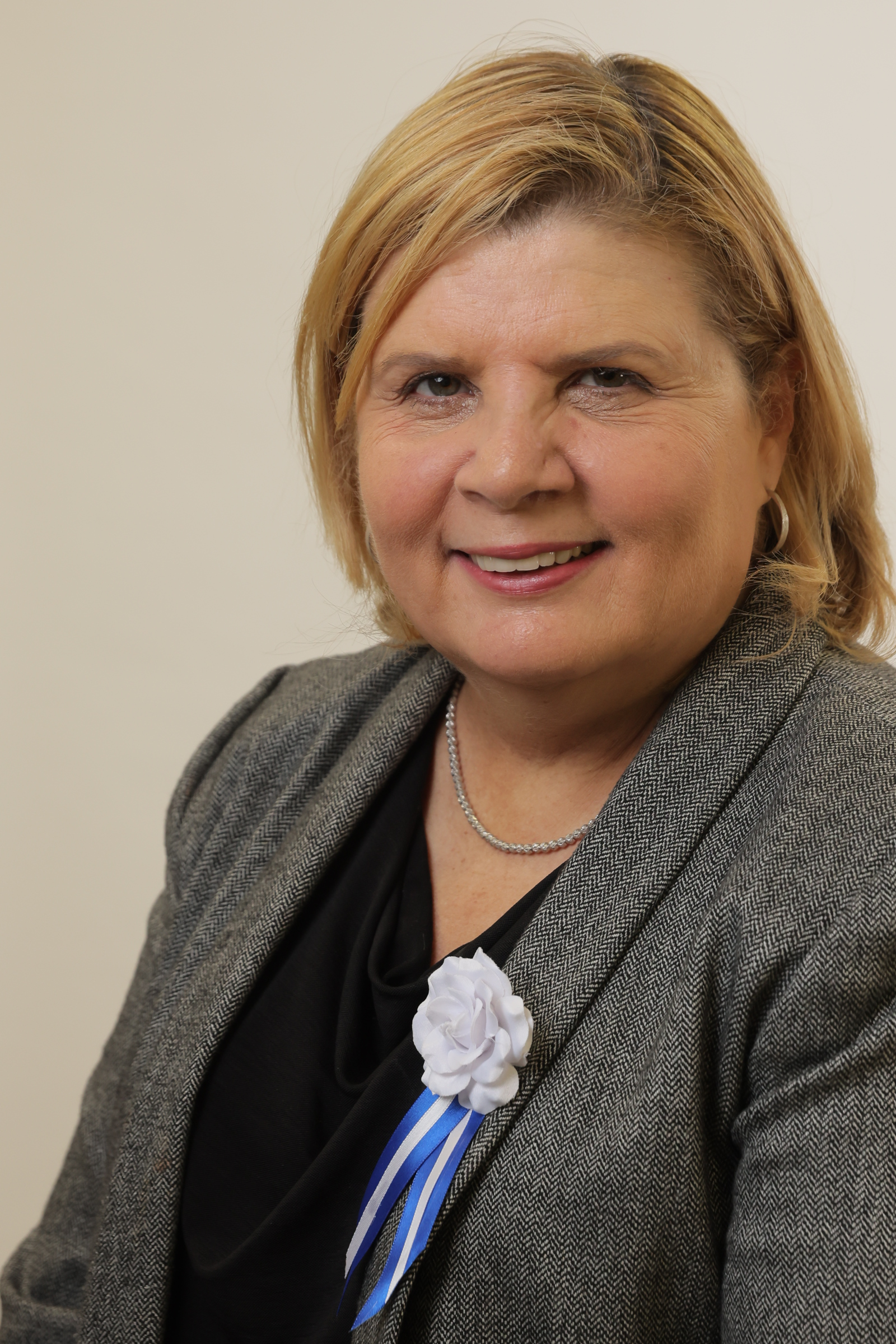
- Barbivai in 2022

Ministerial roles
- 2021–2022: Minister of Economy

Faction represented in the Knesset
- 2019–2020: Blue and White
- 2020–2021: Yesh Atid
- 2022–2023: Yesh Atid

Personal details
- Born: 5 September 1962 (age 64) Ramla, Israel

Military service
- Allegiance: Israel
- Branch/service: Israel Defense Forces
- Years of service: 1981–2014
- Rank: Aluf (Major general)
- Unit: Manpower Directorate
- Commands: Beersheba recruitment office (1995–1997); Adjutant Officer in a reserve division (1997–1999); Head of staff of the Ground Forces manpower section (2000–2003); Adjutant Officer of the Central Command (2003–2005); Chief Officer of the Adjutant Corps (2005–2006); Head of the Ground Forces' manpower section (2006–2008); Human Resources Directorate Administrator and Individuals' Sector head in the Manpower Directorate (2008–2011); Head of the Manpower Directorate (2011–2014)

Orna Barbivai (Hebrew: אורנה ברביבאי; born 5 September 1962) is the former Minister of Economy, a retired major general in the Israel Defense Forces, and the former head of its Manpower Directorate. She was the first woman to be made Major-general (Aluf), the IDF's second highest rank. On 1 January 2019, she announced that she would enter politics and seek a Knesset seat on the list of Yesh Atid, which she won as part of the Blue and White slate. Her place in the Knesset was taken by Yasmin Fridman.

== Biography ==
Growing up in a family of eight children in Afula, Israel, Barbivai is the daughter of Tzila, a Jewish immigrant from Iraq, and Eli Shochetman, a Jewish immigrant from Romania. She was drafted into the IDF in 1981, and has spent her entire career as an officer in the Manpower Directorate. Barbivai holds a bachelor's degree in Social Sciences and Humanities from Ben Gurion University, and a Master of Business Administration Degree from Haifa University. She is also the graduate of the "Turn-point" administration course for senior military officials.

She is married to Moshe Barbivai, and they have three children. They live in Tel Aviv.

In June 2025, it was revealed that Barbivai was behind the broccoli mask in the TV show the Masked Singer.

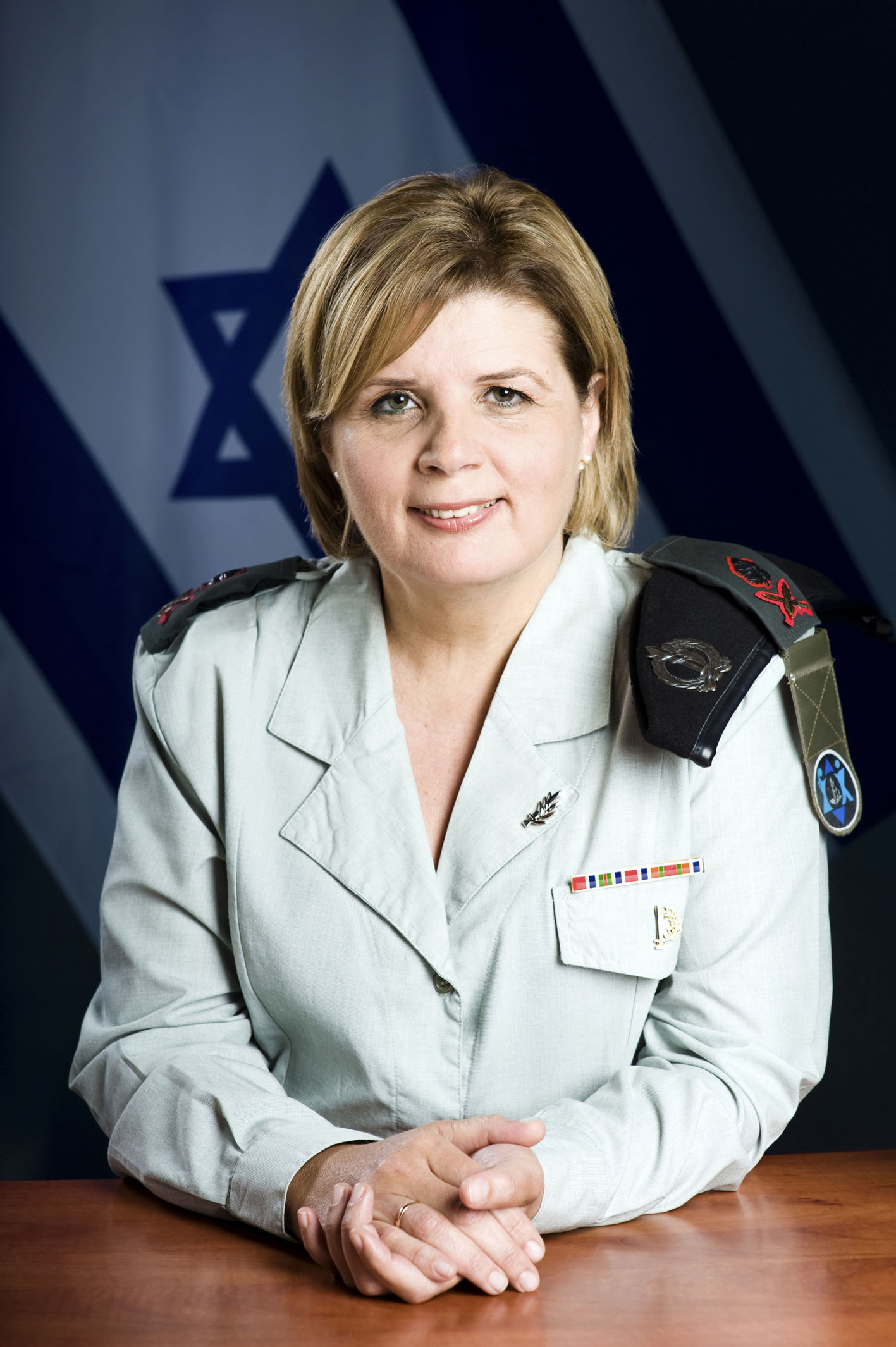
Maj. Gen. Barbivai

== Military career ==
Barbivai was the first female to hold the IDF positions of Chief Adjutant Officer of a Command, Chief Adjutant Officer, Head of the Ground Forces' manpower section, and head of the Individuals' Sector in the Manpower Directorate. In June 2008, she was appointed chief of staff of the Manpower Directorate (AKA).

On 26 May 2011, Israeli Defense Minister Ehud Barak approved her appointment as head of the IDF's Manpower Directorate, replacing Maj. Gen. Avi Zamir. The promotion of Barbivai, a mother of three, to the rank of Major General was praised by Israeli opposition leader Tzipi Livni, who said that "there is no rank that is too heavy for a woman's shoulders, and there is no doubt that Brig.-Gen. Barbivai was appointed because of her talents". On 23 June, Barbivai received her Maj. Gen. ranks and the command of AKA during an official ceremony at the Chief of Staff headquarters in Camp Rabin. In October 2014, after 33 years of active military service, Barbivai retired from the IDF.

== Political career ==
In January 2019, Barbivai announced her intention to enter politics, and she later joined Yesh Atid, where she announced that she will run for a Knesset seat in the upcoming April 2019 Knesset election. Barbivai was number four on the party's list of candidates. After Yesh Atid formed an alliance with the Israel Resilience Party and Telem, which came to be known as Blue and White, Barbivai was placed on the tenth spot of its list, and was elected to the Knesset as a result. She remained on the tenth spot on the alliance's list in both the September election and the 2020 election, and retained her seat in both instances.

In March 2020, Yesh Atid and Telem split from Blue and White, forming their own faction. After the two parties split in January 2021, Barbivai was given the second spot on Yesh Atid's list ahead of the March election, where Barbivai retained her seat. following the inauguration of the twenty-fourth Knesset, Barbivai was appointed to chair the Foreign Affairs and Defense Committee, becoming the first woman to do so. In June, following the formation of the Thirty-sixth government, Barbivai was sworn in as the Minister of Economy. She served until the inauguratiuon of the Thirty-seventh government of Israel on 29 December 2022.

On 1 August 2023, Barbivai resigned from the Knesset to run for Mayor of Tel Aviv. She subsequently lost the election to incumbent Mayor Ron Huldai.

== Honors ==
In 2014 Barbivai was honored as one of the torchbearers in the national Israeli Independence Day ceremony.
