= Meitav =

Meitav (Hebrew: מיטב, lit. Utmost) may refer to:

- Meitav, Israel, a moshav in north-eastern Israel
- Meitav (military unit), a military unit in the IDF
