= Yuval Zellner =

Israeli politician

- יובל צלנר
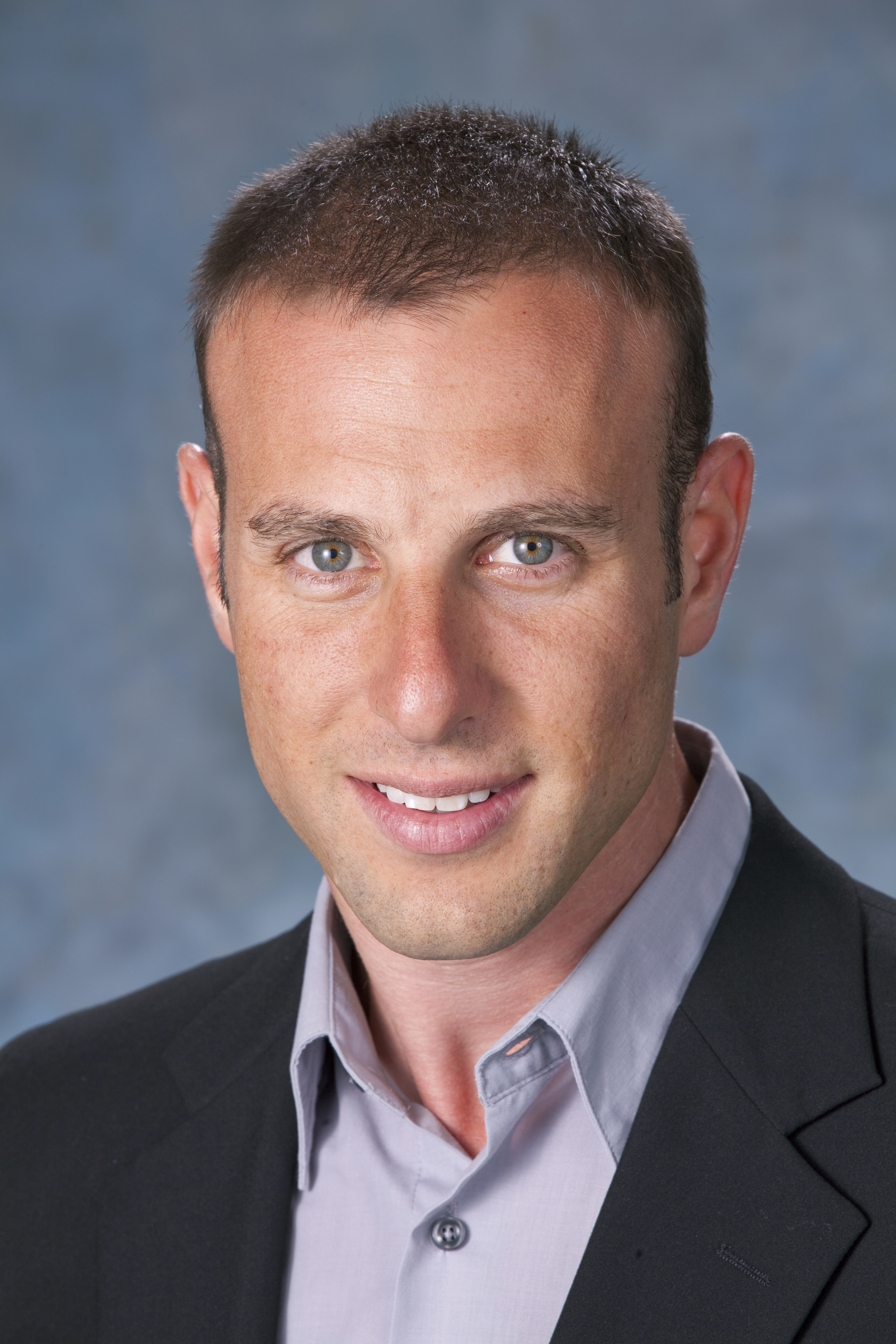
- Zellner in 2012

Faction represented in the Knesset
- 2012–2013: Kadima
- 2014–2015: Kadima

Personal details
- Born: 2 March 1978 (age 48) Ramat HaSharon, Israel

Yuval Zellner (Hebrew: יובל צלנר; born 2 March 1978) is an Israeli politician. He served as a member of the Knesset for Kadima between 2012 and 2013, and again from 2014 until 2015. He currently serves as a member of the Tel Aviv city council.

== Biography ==
Born in Ramat HaSharon, Zellner served in the Paratroopers Recon branch of the Paratroopers Brigade and was seriously wounded during his national service. Between 1999 and 2003 he studied law at the Hebrew University of Jerusalem, earning an LLB as well as simultaneously studying for BA in political science at Tel Aviv University. Between 2003 and 2007 he studied for an MA in political science at Tel Aviv University, and also gained an MBA from the Interdisciplinary Center Herzliya in 2008.

Zellner worked as an assistant to Haim Ramon during his time as Internal Affairs Minister, before becoming chief of staff in the Prime Minister's Office when Ariel Sharon was Prime Minister. As part of his role, Zellner led the preparations for the historic visit to Israel of Pope John Paul II, along with retired IDF Chief of Staff Rafi Peledand then-Chief of Staff Yehuda Wilk

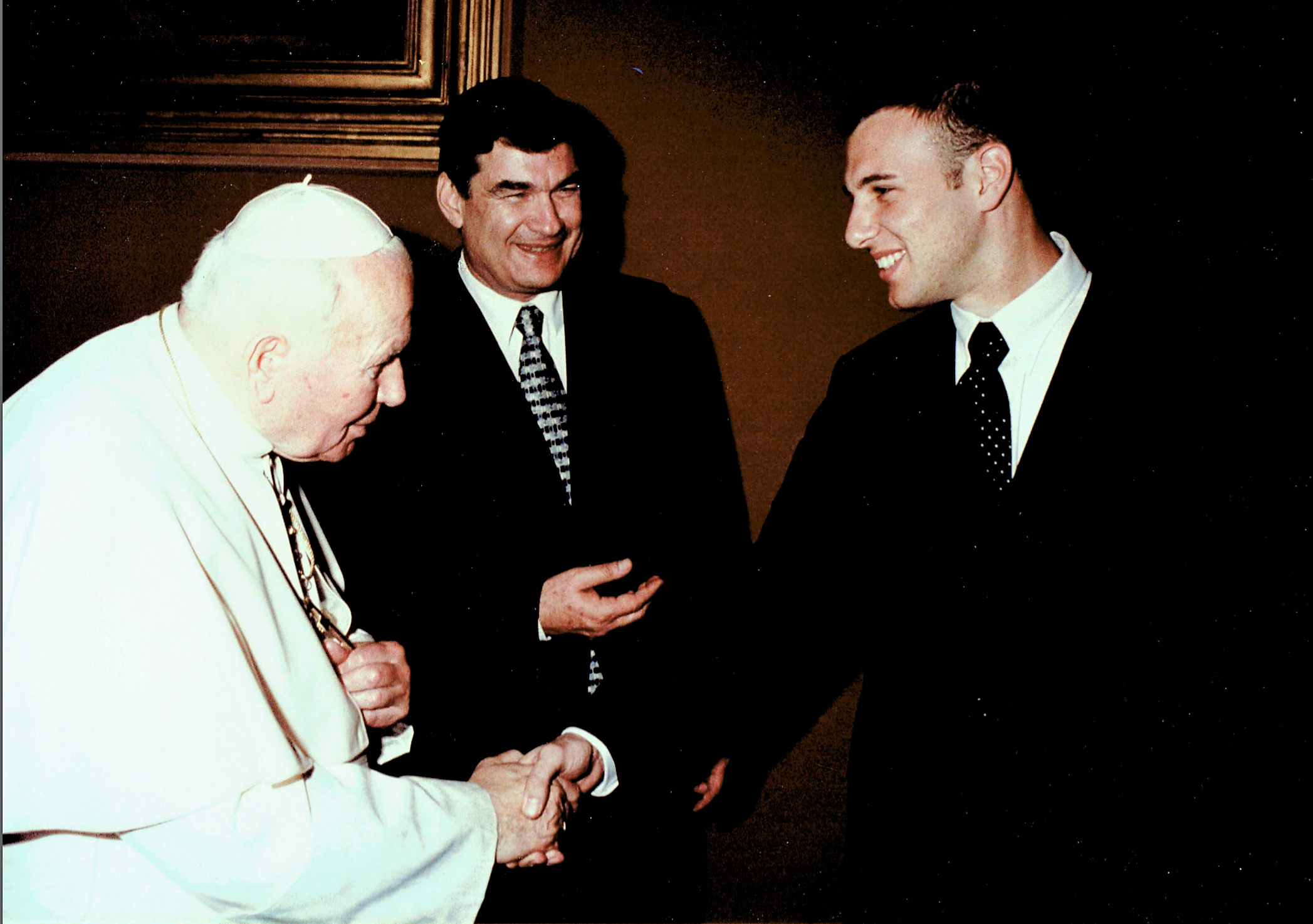
Pope John Paul II with Haim Ramon and Zellner.

He later worked as CEO of the Economic Development Group in Ramat HaSharon until 2012.

Previously a member of the Labor Party, Zellner joined Kadima in 2005. Ranked 34th on Kadima's list for the 2009 elections, he failed to win a seat, but entered the Knesset on 3 May 2012 as a replacement for Tzipi Livni, who had resigned her seat after losing the party's leadership election to Shaul Mofaz.

Placed sixth on the Kadima list for the 2013 elections, he lost his seat when the party was reduced to two MKs. However, he returned to the Knesset on 18 December 2014 following Yisrael Hasson's resignation and other resignations from the party list. The party did not contest the 2015 elections, resulting in Zellner losing his seat.

Zellner ran for Mayor of Tel Aviv in the 2024 election as a member of New Hope. He came in third out of three candidates, winning 11% of the vote. Zellner also headed New Hope's list for the Tel Aviv city council, and was elected its sole councillor.

=== Personal life ===
Zellner was married to reality TV star Dafna Shahar and they have one daughter.
