= Meir Sheetrit =

Israeli politician

- מאיר שטרית
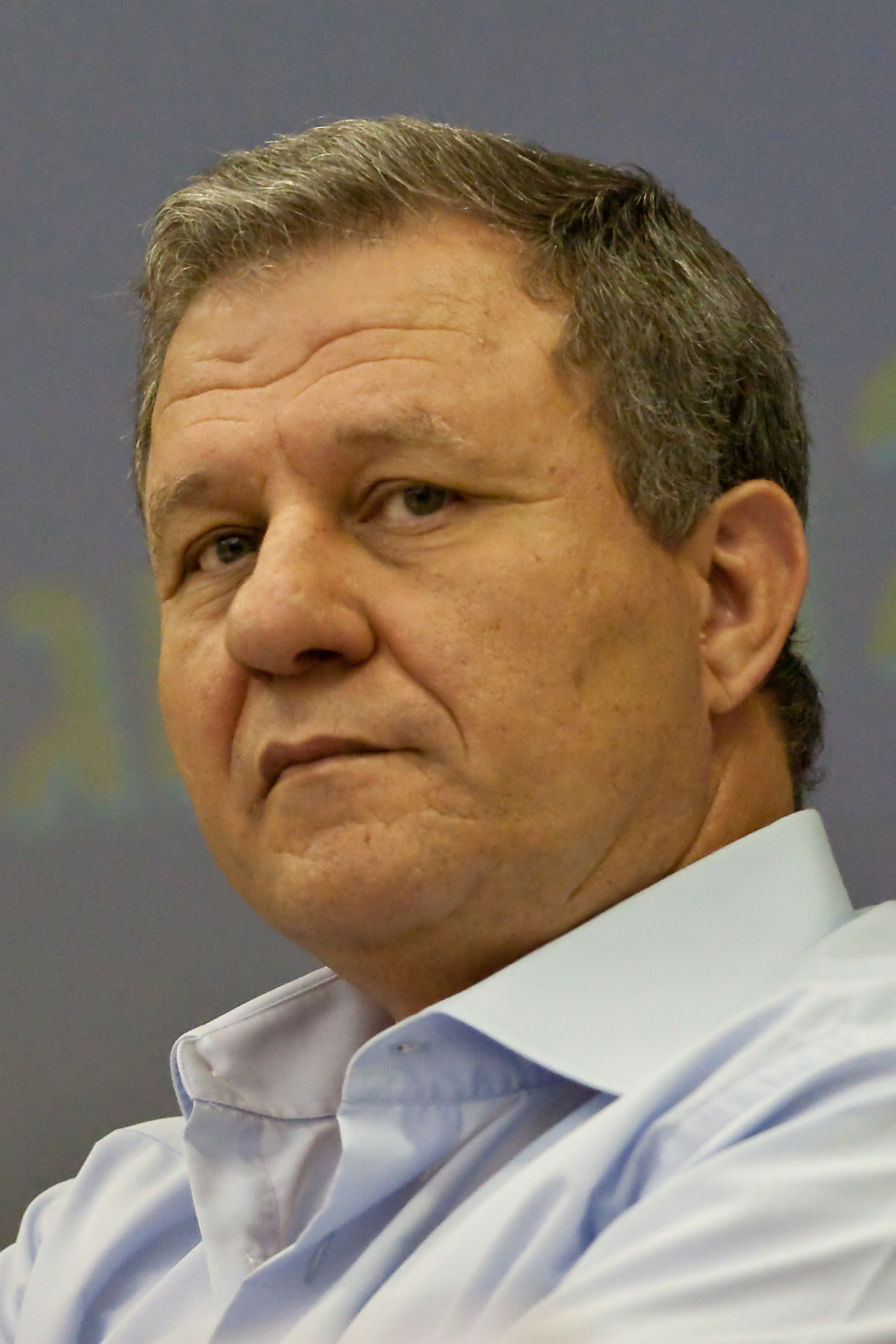
- Sheetrit in 2009

Ministerial roles
- 1998–1999: Minister of Finance
- 2001–2003: Minister of Justice
- 2004–2006: Minister of Transportation
- 2006: Minister of Justice
- 2006: Minister of Education, Culture & Sport
- 2006–2007: Minister of Housing & Construction
- 2007–2009: Minister of the Interior

Faction represented in the Knesset
- 1981–1988: Likud
- 1992–2005: Likud
- 2005–2012: Kadima
- 2012–2015: Hatnua

Personal details
- Born: 10 October 1948 (age 78) Ksar es Souk, French Morocco

Meir Sheetrit (Hebrew: מאיר שטרית; born 10 October 1948) is an Israeli politician. He served as a member of the Knesset in two spells for Likud between 1981 and 1988, and again from 1992 until 2005, when he joined Kadima. He remained a Knesset member for Kadima until joining Hatnuah in 2012, for whom he served until 2015. He also held several ministerial posts, including being Minister of the Interior, Minister of Housing & Construction, Minister of Finance, Minister of Justice, Minister of Transportation and Minister of Education, Culture & Sport. He was also a candidate for President of Israel in 2014.

== Early life ==
Sheetrit was born in Ksar es Souk (now Errachidia), French Morocco. His family immigrated to Israel in 1957. He earned a BA and an MA in Public Policy from Bar-Ilan University.

== Political career ==
=== Likud ===
Sheetrit began his political career in 1974 as mayor of the city of Yavne, a position he held until 1987.

He was first elected to the Knesset in 1981 on the Likud list. He was re-elected in 1984, but lost his seat in 1988. That year he was elected treasurer of the Jewish Agency and served in this position until 1992, when he returned to the Knesset. In 1998 he was appointed Minister of Finance, serving until the fall of Benjamin Netanyahu's first government in 1999.

Sheetrit unsuccessfully ran in the September 1999 Likud leadership election.

He returned to the cabinet in 2001 as Minister of Justice. After being re-elected in 2003, he was appointed Minister in the Ministry of Finance, where he worked closely with then Minister of Finance Netanyahu who was spearheading a sweeping privatization reform. He was appointed Minister of Transportation in 2004, and later served as Minister of Education, Culture and Sport until 2006.

=== Kadima ===
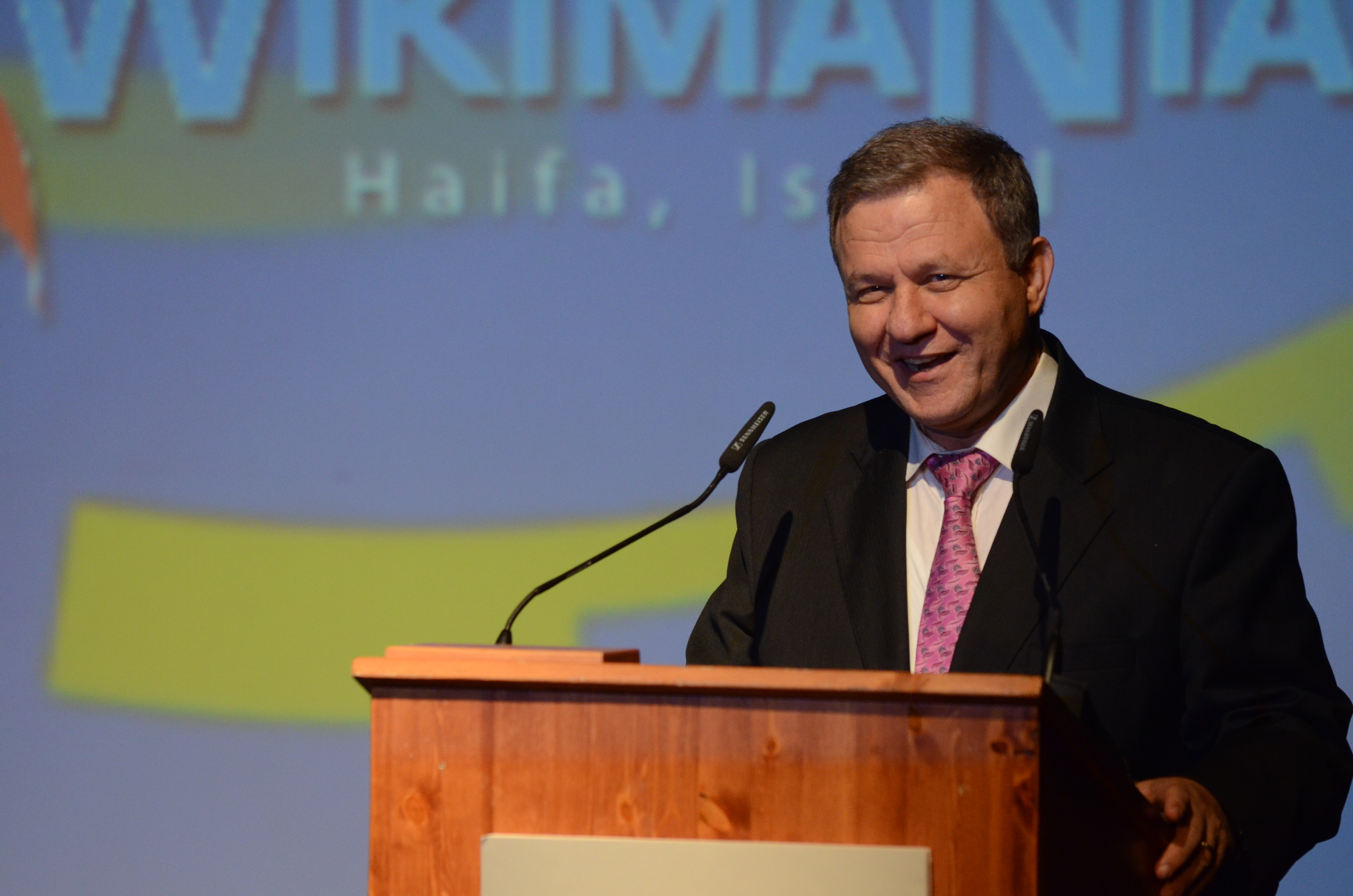
Sheetrit speaking at Wikimania conference in Haifa, 2011

In 2005, Sheetrit left Likud and joined Ariel Sharon's new Kadima party. He was re-elected in 2006 and appointed Minister of Housing and Construction, a post he held until July 2007, when he was appointed Minister of Internal Affairs. Between 23 August and 29 November 2006, he also served as Acting Justice Minister following Haim Ramon's resignation on 18 August over an indecent assault indictment. Sheetrit was replaced in the Justice portfolio by Tzipi Livni, who also continued to serve as Foreign Minister.

In February 2008, whilst Israeli airstrikes in Gaza were ongoing, Sheetrit told Army Radio that: "If it were up to me, I would hit everything that moves with weapons and ammunition", adding: "I don't think we have to show pity for anyone who wants to kill us."

Following Ehud Olmert's resignation as party leader, Sheetrit ran for the party chairmanship. However, he came third out of the four candidates in the election, receiving only 8.5% of the vote. Placed seventh on the party's list, he retained his seat in the 2009 elections

In early 2011, he and another MK sprayed air freshener in the Knesset, complaining about the "stench of bad politics". Both MKs were escorted out and speaker Reuven Rivlin condemned the actions.

As head of the Knesset Science and Technology Committee, he spoke at the international Wikimania conference held in Haifa in 2011.

=== Hatnuah ===
On 1 December 2012, Sheetrit joined Tzipi Livni's new party, Hatnuah. He disagreed with Livni's decision to run as part of the joint Zionist Union list with the Labor Party in the 2015 elections, and he opted not to contest the elections.

Sheetrit contested in the 2014 Israeli presidential election, coming second with 31 votes in the first round, and losing in the second round with 53 votes. Reuven Rivlin won with 63 votes.

=== Post-Knesset Career ===
Sheetrit ran for Mayor of Yavne in 2018 under a local electoral list, but was defeated by Zvi Gov-Ari, winning 20.4% of the vote to Gov-Ari's 58.4%. In November 2021, Sheetrit was appointed to a committee formed to choose a new Attorney General, but decided to forego membership of the committee following public backlash.
