= Yisrael Hasson =

Israeli politician and intelligence officer

- ישראל חסון
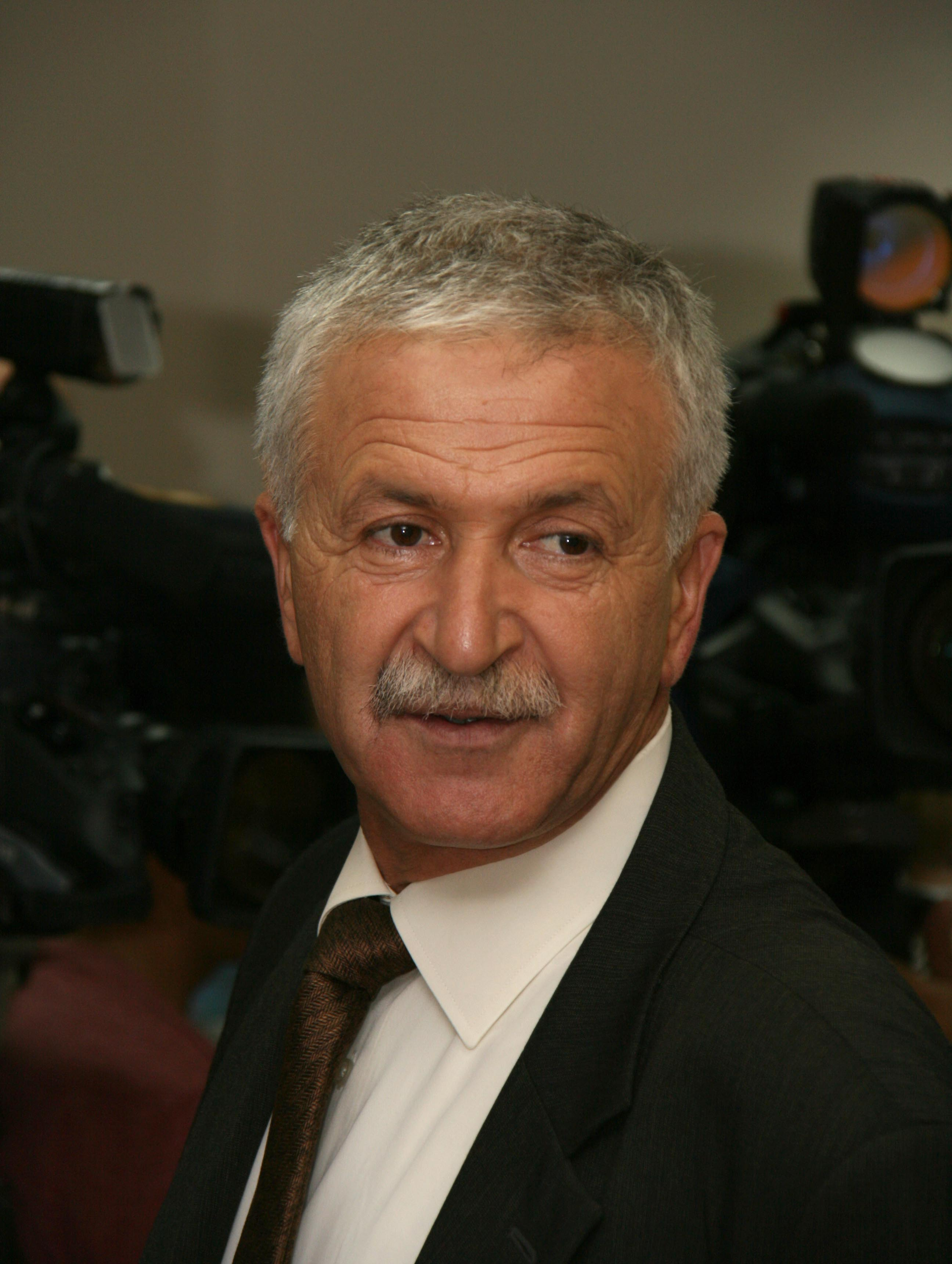

Director of the Israel Antiquities Authority
- In office 2014–2020
- Preceded by: Shuka Dorfman
- Succeeded by: Eli Escusido

Faction represented in the Knesset
- 2006–2009: Yisrael Beiteinu
- 2009–2014: Kadima

Personal details
- Born: 27 April 1955 (age 71) Damascus, Syria
- Party: Kadima (2008–2014)
- Other political affiliations: Yisrael Beiteinu (2006–2008)
- Occupation: Politician, former intelligence officer

Military service
- Allegiance: Israel
- Branch/service: Shin Bet
- Years of service: 1970s–2001
- Rank: Deputy Director

Yisrael Hasson (Hebrew: ישראל חסון; born 27 April 1955) is an Israeli politician and former Deputy Director of Shin Bet. He served as a member of the Knesset for Yisrael Beiteinu and Kadima between 2006 and 2014, before becoming Chairman of the Israel Antiquities Authority from 2014 until his resignation in 2020.

== Biography ==
Hasson was born in Damascus and made aliyah to Israel at the age of seven. He served in Shin Bet for twenty-three years and is considered a celebrated agents' recruiter and operations leader. He was involved in the negotiations behind the Wye River, Taba, and Hebron agreements, as well as Ehud Barak's negotiations in Camp David. He has also been Israel's envoy to Arab countries on numerous occasions. During his last position in the Shabak, he was nominated as its Deputy Director, under Ami Ayalon.

In 2001, after Ariel Sharon told him to ignore a cease-fire offer from Marwan Barghouti during the Second Intifada, Hasson resigned from the organization and entered business. He founded the Hasson Energy company which delivers fuel to factories and gas stations in Israel's north, and also traded with the Palestinian National Authority. He was voted into the seventeenth Knesset in the 2006 elections.

In 2006 Hasson proposed a Knesset bill which require the internet websites to identify and tag every talkbacker who clicks on the talkback button, stating "I'm not seeking censorship... I only want people to know they must take responsibility for the words they write – just as they are responsible for what they say before a live audience."

In November 2008, Hasson left Yisrael Beiteinu to join Kadima. The immediate reason, while not official, is generally believed to be Lieberman's statements condemning Egyptian president Hosni Mubarak. Placed twenty-fifth on the Kadima list, Hasson retained his seat in the 2009 elections.

Placed second on the Kadima list for the 2013 elections, Hasson was re-elected as the party won two seats. However, he resigned from the Knesset in December 2014 after being appointed Director of the Israel Antiquities Authority. He was replaced by Yuval Zellner.
