= Gideon Ezra =

Israeli politician (1937–2012)

- גדעון עזרא
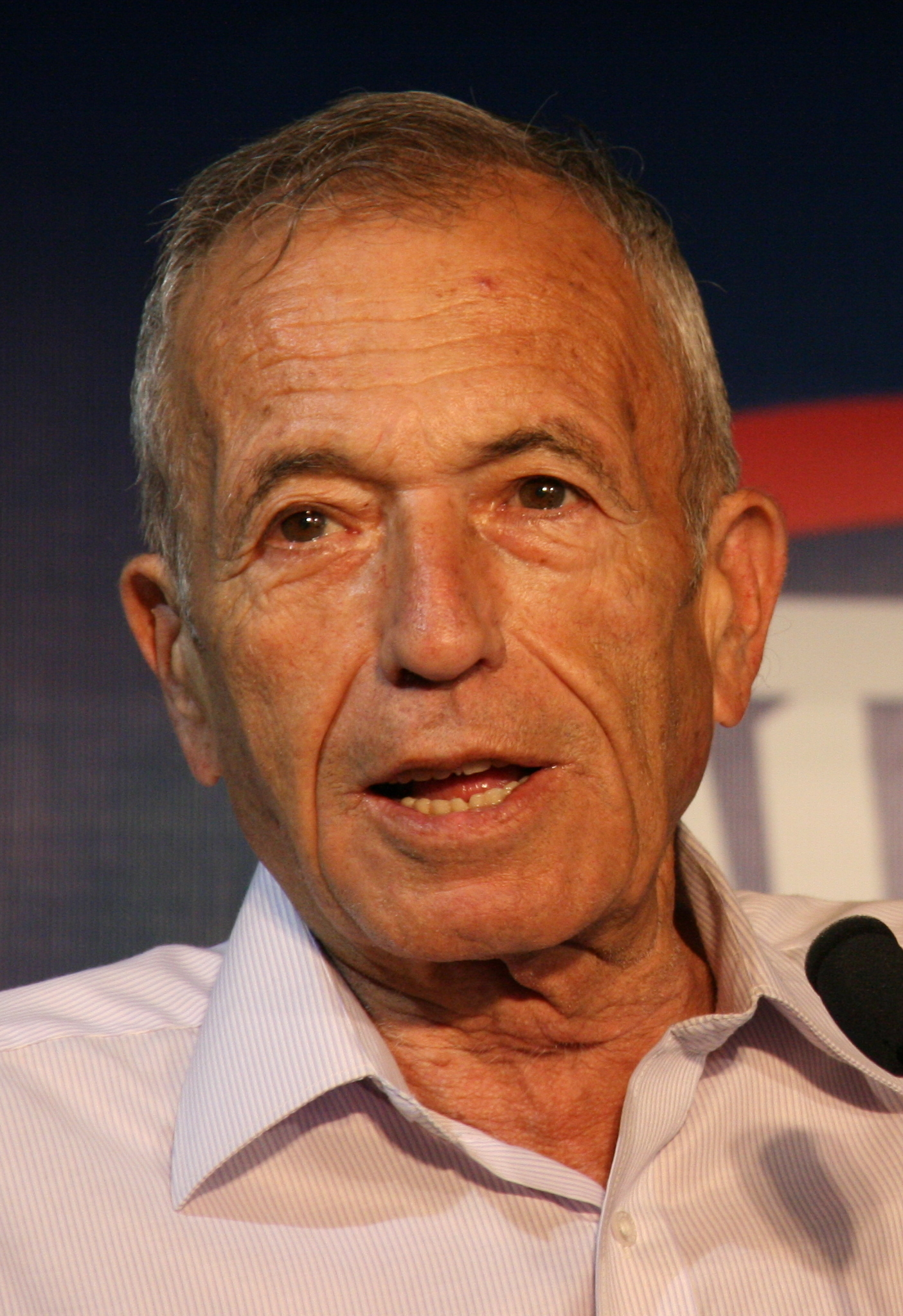
- Ezra in 2009

Ministerial roles
- 2003–2004: Minister in the Prime Minister's Office
- 2004–2005: Minister of Tourism
- 2004–2006: Minister of Internal Security
- 2006–2009: Minister of Environmental Protection

Faction represented in the Knesset
- 1996–2005: Likud
- 2005–2012: Kadima

Personal details
- Born: 30 June 1937 Jerusalem, Mandatory Palestine
- Died: 17 May 2012 (aged 74)

Gideon Ezra (Hebrew: גדעון עזרא; 30 June 1937 – 17 May 2012) was an Israeli politician. He served as a member of the Knesset for Likud and Kadima between 1996 and 2012 and also held several ministerial portfolios.

== Biography ==
Ezra's family came originally as immigrants from Iraq and settled in Palestine. He was born in Jerusalem and attended high school in the Hebrew University Secondary School. He served in the Israeli Defense Force between 1955 and 1958 in the Nahal. He studied geography and political science at the University of Haifa. He worked for the Shin Bet from 1962 to 1995. After leaving the service, he served as an advisor to then Minister of Internal Security, Moshe Shahal.

=== Political career ===
Ezra was elected to the Knesset in the 1996 elections on the Likud list, and retained his seat in the 1999 and 2003 elections. After Ariel Sharon beat Ehud Barak in the 2001 election for Prime Minister, Ezra was appointed Deputy Minister of Internal Security. He was given his first full ministerial position after the 2003 elections when appointed Minister in the Ministry of the Prime Minister's Office. When Binyamin Elon was sacked as Minister of Tourism in July 2004, Ezra replaced him, initially as Acting Minister (the position was made permanent at the end of August). From September 2004 he also held the position of Acting Minister of Internal Security after Tzachi Hanegbi resigned in the face of corruption allegations. This ministerial post was also made permanent in November, and Ezra oversaw the evacuation of the Amona settlement in February 2006. In November 2005 he was attacked during a rally in Sderot against Israel's unilateral disengagement plan over his support for it.

In January 2005 he was replaced as Tourism Minister by Avraham Hirschson. When Sharon founded Kadima in late 2005, Ezra joined him, picking up the Environment Ministry portfolio from Labor's Shalom Simhon. After the 2006 elections he was appointed Minister of Environmental Protection by Ehud Olmert. In April 2007 he opposed plans to build a solar energy plant near Dimona to avoid harm to a nature reserve. He has also overseen the expansion of container deposit legislation to cover 1.5 litre bottles.

He retained his seat again in the 2009 elections, having been placed twelfth on the Kadima list. However, he lost his place in the cabinet as the Likud-led coalition formed the government. On 17 May 2012, aged 74, Ezra died of lung cancer after a two-year battle with the disease. He was succeeded by Akram Hasson.
