= Avraham Hirschson =

Israeli politician (1941–2022)

Abraham Hirschson
- אברהם הירשזון
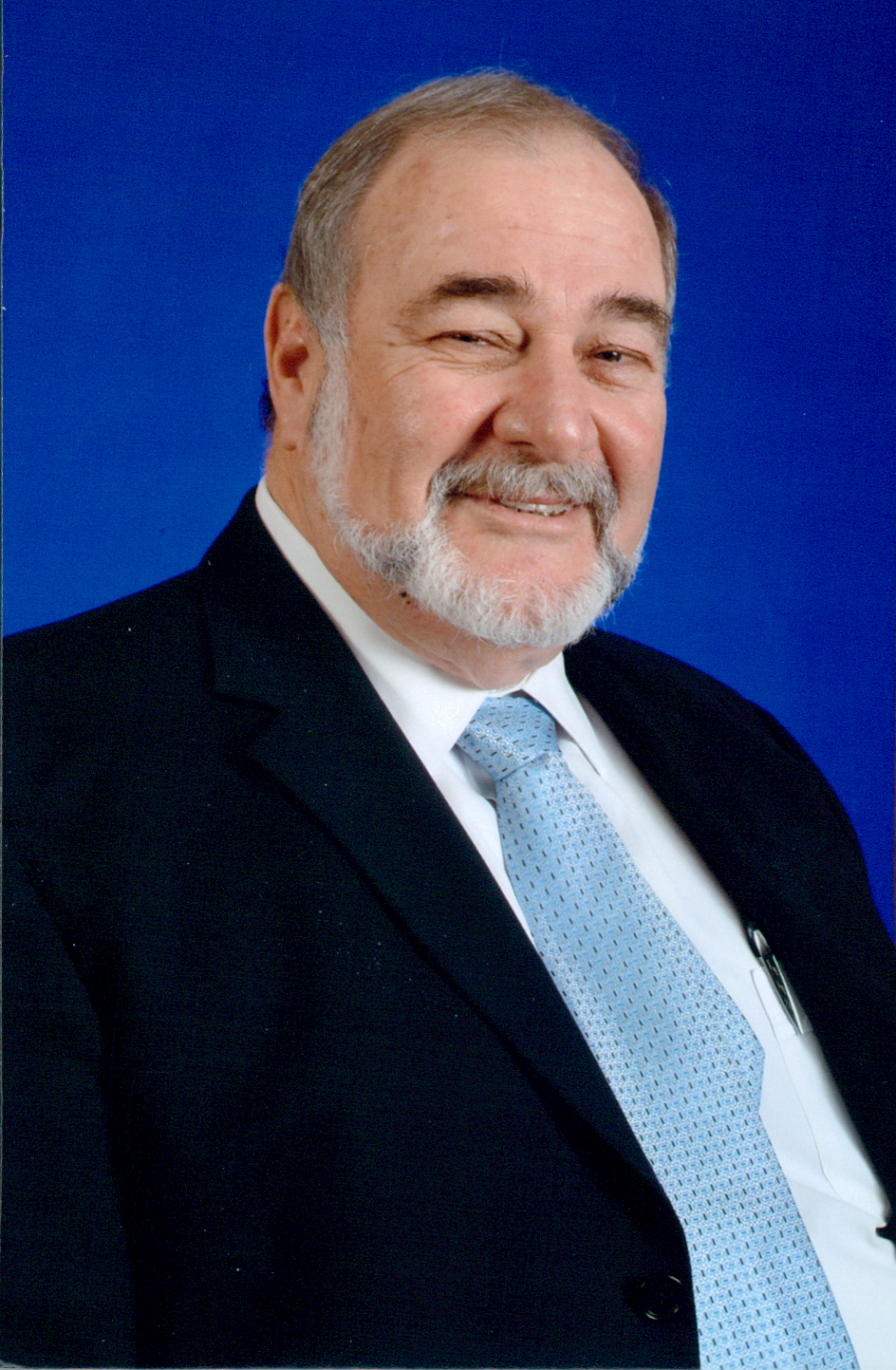

Ministerial roles
- 2005–2006: Minister of Tourism
- 2006: Minister of Communications
- 2006–2007: Minister of Finance

Faction represented in the Knesset
- 1983–1984: Likud
- 1992–2005: Likud
- 2005–2009: Kadima

Personal details
- Born: 11 February 1941 Tel Mond, Mandatory Palestine
- Died: 7 March 2022 (aged 81)

Abraham Hirschson (Hebrew: אברהם הירשזון, romanized: Avraham Hirschson; 11 February 1941 – 7 March 2022) was an Israeli politician. He served as a member of the Knesset for Likud and Kadima between 1981 and 1984, and again from 1992 until 2009. He also held the posts of Minister of Communications, Minister of Finance and Minister of Tourism. He resigned following allegations of corruption, and was ultimately convicted of stealing close to 2 million shekels from the National Workers Labor Federation while he was its chairman.

== Background ==
Hirschson was born in Tel Mond and later resided in Tel Aviv. From 1970 to 1992, he was secretary-general for the National Youth League (the youth branch of the National Histadrut). He has been the chairman of the National Histadrut since 1995 and chairman of the National Health Fund since 1996 (the revisionist counterparts to the larger General Histadrut and General Health Fund respectively). He helped found the March of the Living programme in 1988, but has not been involved in the organization for a number of years. During his involvement with the March of the Living the organization was accused of handling donations in a non-transparent manner.

== Political career ==
As a member of the Likud Party, Hirschson joined the Knesset as a mid-term replacement in June 1983 and served until the end of the 10th Knesset in July 1984. He rejoined the Knesset in 1992, having been elected to the 13th Knesset, and has served since then. On 10 January 2005, he replaced Gideon Ezra as Minister of Tourism. In late November 2005, he resigned from the Likud and joined Kadima. On 18 January 2006, he was appointed Minister of Communications while retaining the Tourism ministry. That appointment filled one of the vacancies left by the resignation of all Labour Party ministers in November 2005, the act that resulted in the calling of elections for March 2006.

Following the 2006 elections, Hirschson became Minister of Finance as part of the Kadima-led 31st Government, which took office on 4 May 2006.

Hirschson, who has been a strong advocate for the privatization of Israeli state-owned services, stunned his audience at the 2006 Caesarea Forum with allegations that anonymous individuals opposed to his reforms have attempted to bring harm to his person. He was quoted by Haaretz in its 23 June 2006 edition saying, "There are people who are trying to harm me and my family, by means of pressure and threats ... Detectives are following me, with the aim of harming me. This will not work with me; even if the threats intensify, I will continue to promote the reforms that are so important for the people of Israel."

On 20 March 2007, Hirschson was investigated for seven hours by Israeli police regarding an alleged embezzlement at a non-profit organization while serving as the chairman of the National Workers Labor Federation. He suspended himself from May to July while Israeli police investigated him for embezzlement, before resigning on 1 July.

In May 2008, Israeli Attorney General Menachem Mazuz announced that Hirschson would be indicted with a string of crimes including breach of trust, aggravated fraud, theft, forgery of corporate documents and money laundering. In February 2009, Hirschson lost his Knesset seat in the 2009 elections.

On 8 June 2009, Hirschson was convicted of embezzling millions of shekels from the National Workers Labor Federation while he was its chairman. The conviction by the District Court of Tel Aviv-Yafo case 40138/08 also cited financial abuses in the March of the Living for Hirschson's private travel. In July, he was sentenced to five years and five months of jail and a fine of 450,000 shekels. He began serving his sentence on 1 September 2009. He submitted an appeal to the Supreme Court on 24 September 2009. He served his sentence until January 2013.

== Personal life ==
Hirschson was widowed and had three sons: Ofer (born 1968), Elroi (born 1982), and Barak (born 1984). He died on 7 March 2022, at the age of 81.

== See also ==
- List of Israeli public officials convicted of crimes
