= 2006 Kadima interim leadership election =

Kadima leadership election

- 16 January 2006
Candidate	Ehud Olmert
Popular vote	elected
Leader before election
Ariel Sharon incapacitated
Elected Leader
Ehud Olmert interim

The 2006 Kadima interim leadership election was held 16 January 2006 to elect the interim leader of the Kadima party. The election took place roughly two weeks after party leader and prime minister of Israel Ariel Sharon was incapacitated after suffering a stroke. It saw Acting Prime Minister Ehud Olmert selected as interim party leader, positioning him to lead the party in the 2006 Israeli legislative election on 28 March 2006.
