= 2008 Kadima leadership election =

- 17 September 2008
- Turnout: 53.7%
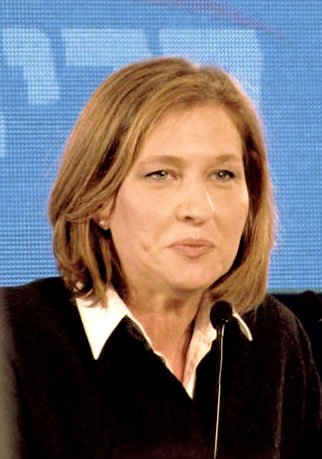

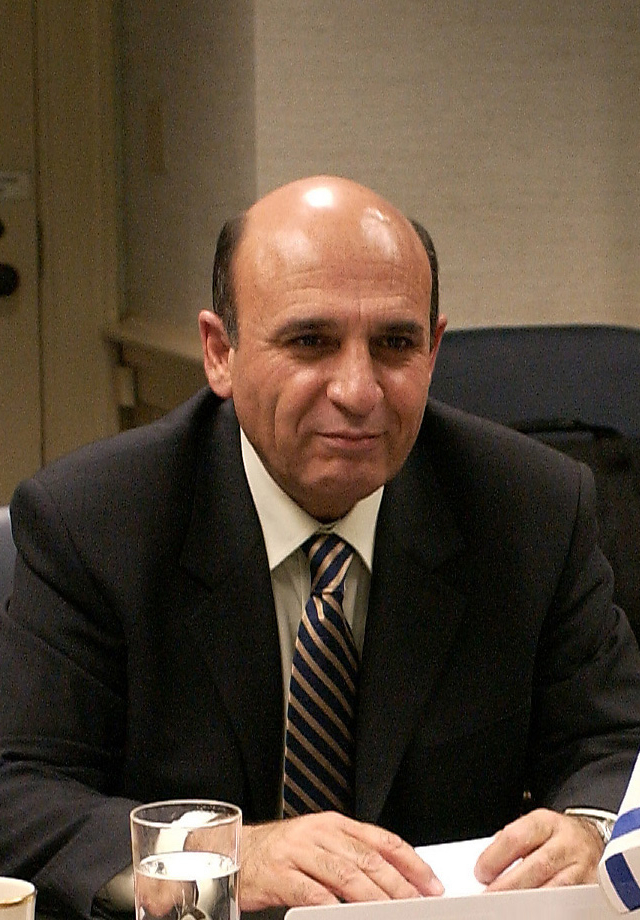

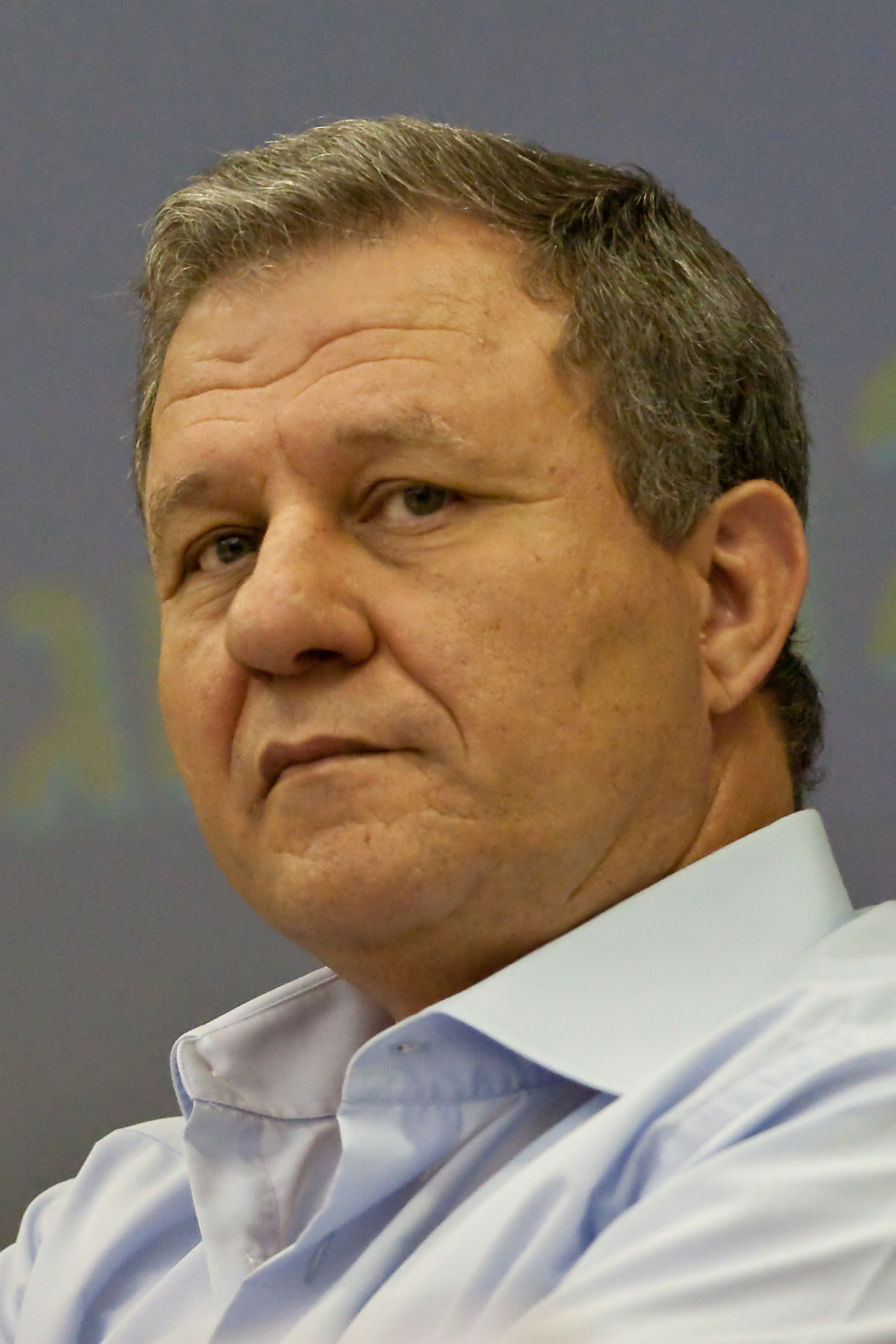

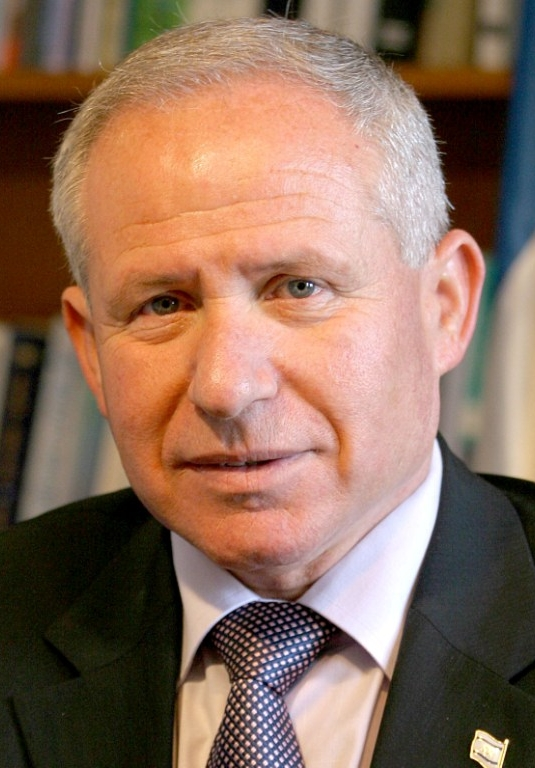
Candidate	Tzipi Livni	Shaul Mofaz
Party	Kadima	Kadima
Popular vote	16,936	16,505
Percentage	43.06%	41.96%
Candidate	Meir Sheetrit	Avi Dichter
Party	Kadima	Kadima
Popular vote	3,327	2,563
Percentage	8.46%	6.52%
Kadima leader before election
Ehud Olmert
Kadima leader
Tzipi Livni

An election for the leadership of Kadima was held on 17 September 2008 as a concession to Kadima's coalition partner, Labor, which had threatened to bring down the government if Prime Minister Ehud Olmert didn't stand aside following police investigations into alleged corruption during his terms as minister and as mayor of Jerusalem.

As Kadima remained the largest party in the Knesset and the coalition, Foreign Minister Tzipi Livni, the designated new leader after balloting, had the chance to form a government without a need for elections.

The election was the party's first official leadership election. Previously, in 2006, there had been a leadership vote, but it was for interim leader.

== Candidates ==
- Tzipi Livni, foreign minister of israel
- Avi Dichter, Internal Security Minister
- Shaul Mofaz, Transport Minister
- Meir Sheetrit, Minister of the Interior

== Campaign ==
On 28 July 2008 Livni announced that she would challenge Prime Minister Olmert for party leadership. Olmert was being politically dragged down by corruption investigations. Livni argued that the party had been misled under Olmert's leadership On 30 July Olmert announced that he had against seeking reelection as party leader and prime minister.

The two front-runners throughout the campaign consistently remained Mofaz and Livni, with Livni always holding a consistent lead in the polls.

While both frontrunners supported a two-state solution, Mofaz attacked Livni for wanting to divide Jerusalem in a final peace deal with the Palestinians, and claimed that his military experience would make him a more qualified Prime Minister. Livni and her supporters claimed that a vote for Mofaz is the same as a vote for the Likud due to Mofaz's hawkish and more right-wing positions. Livni also enjoyed a "clean" reputation, being seen as having honesty and integrity, and being free from corruption allegations. Outgoing Prime Minister Ehud Olmert remained neutral in the primary, but was alleged to privately favor Mofaz.

== Results ==
Exit polls released after the poll indicated a double-digit victory for Livni. The actual vote count turned out much closer, amid very low turnout, with Shaul Mofaz coming within a few hundred votes of winning an unexpected victory over Livni. Supporters of Mofaz called for a recount but Mofaz rejected any legal challenge of the declared result and called Livni to congratulate her on her victory, as did Sheetrit and Dichter.

Candidate	Votes	%
Tzipi Livni	16,936	43.06
Shaul Mofaz	16,505	41.96
Meir Sheetrit	3,327	8.46
Avi Dichter	2,563	6.52
Total	39,331	100.00
Source: BBC News, Ynet

== Aftermath ==
After Mofaz's loss, he announced that he would be taking a break from politics and leaving the government and Knesset. However, he would remain a member of Kadima. Soon after, however, he rescinded his statement, and went on to win the 2nd place in Kadima's Knesset list for the 2009 election. In a rematch in 2012, he won the leadership, and in the 2013 election led the party to a stunning collapse, winning 2 seats.

After her election, Livni failed to form a governing coalition, having failed to reach an agreement with Shas. Subsequently Knesset elections were held on 10 February 2009.

== See also ==
- 2012 Kadima leadership election
- 2012 Likud leadership election
