= Amos Shapira =

Israeli university president

- עמוס שפירא
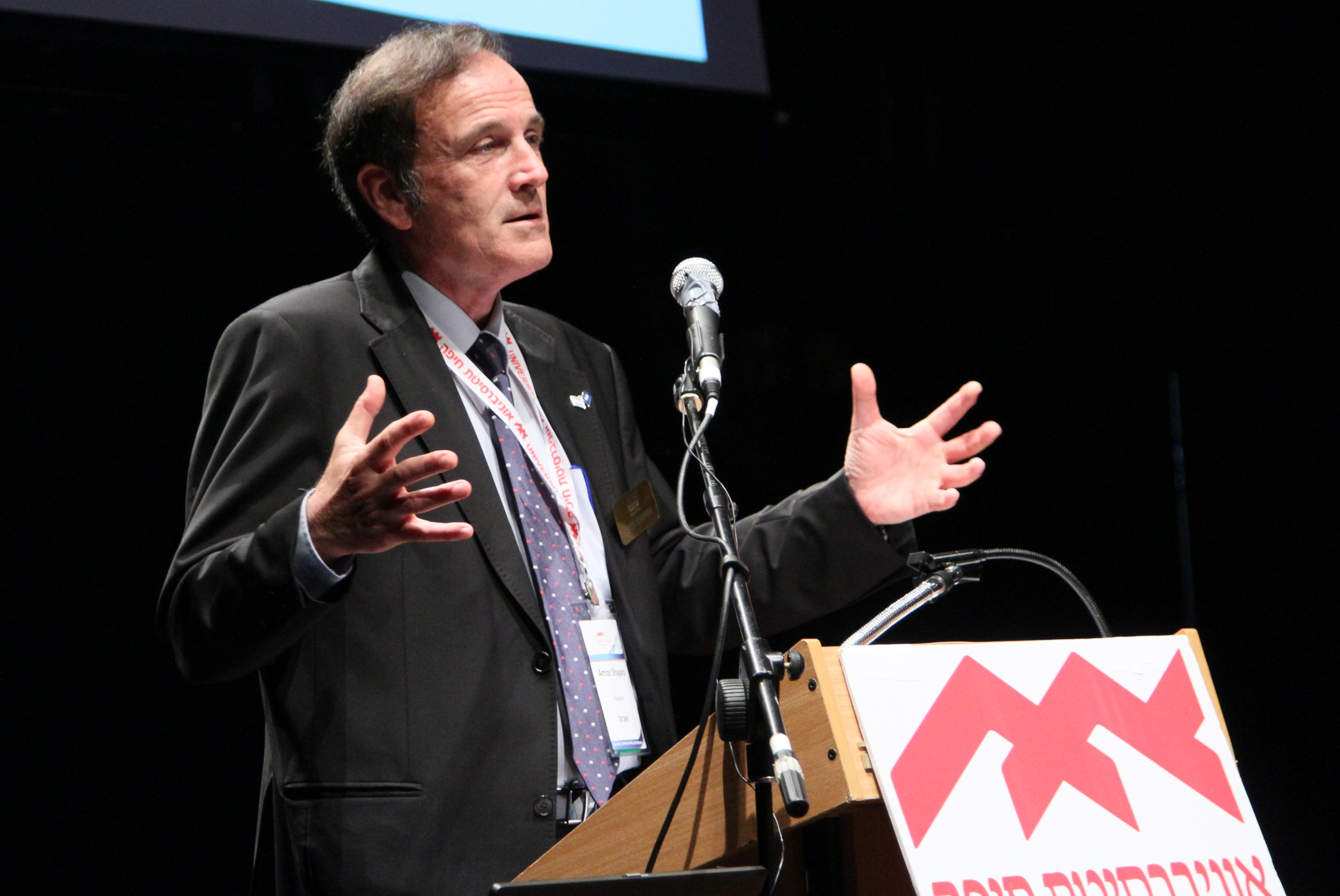
- Amos Shapira (2013)
- Born: 1949 (age 76–77)
- Education: University of Haifa (B.A. in economics); Technion – Israel Institute of Technology (MA in industrial management)
- Known for: President of El Al Airlines; President of Cellcom; President of the University of Haifa

Amos Shapira (Hebrew: עמוס שפירא; born 1949) is an Israeli businessman. He is the former president of El Al Airlines, Cellcom, and the University of Haifa.

== Biography ==
Shapira is a sixth-generation Israeli. His grandfather was an Orthodox rabbi in the agricultural settlement of Yesud HaMa'ala in the Hula Valley in Northern Israel.

Shapira earned his B.A. in economics from the University of Haifa in 1980, and his MA in industrial management from the Technion – Israel Institute of Technology.

Shapira was President and CEO of El Al Airlines from 2003 to 2005, and then of Cellcom (appointed in 2005), Israel's largest cellular provider.

He then was made President of the University of Haifa, beginning in October 2012.
