= Amir Badran =

- אמיר בדראן أمير بدران

Deputy mayor of Tel Aviv
- Incumbent
- Assumed office 2024
- Parliamentary group: Ir LeKulanu (2016–2018), Anachnu HaIr (2018–2024), Kulanu HaIr (2024-present)

Tel Aviv-Yafo Municipality Alderman
- Incumbent
- Assumed office 2016

Hadash chairman in Jaffa
- Incumbent
- Assumed office 2008

Personal details
- Born: 1972 (age 53–54) Ajami, Jaffa, Tel Aviv
- Party: Hadash

Amir Badran (Hebrew: אמיר בדראן; Arabic: أمير بدران; born 1972) is an Israeli lawyer and politician who serves as the deputy mayor of Tel Aviv-Yafo Municipality. He has been a member of the Tel Aviv-Yafo City Municipality since 2016.

Badran is the chairman of the Jaffa branch of Hadash, a left-wing to far-left political organization in Israel that operates within the Joint List political alliance. He has represented the factions "Kulanu HaIr" (All of Us Are the city), "Anachnu HaIr" (We Are the city) and "Ir LeKulanu" (City For Us All). In September 2023, Badran announced his candidacy for mayor of Tel Aviv-Yafo, heading the "Kulanu HaIr" list in the municipal elections. However, he withdrew from the mayoral race just days before the vote. Despite his withdrawal, the list received approximately 15,000 votes, the highest number ever won by a list headed by an Arab candidate in Tel Aviv-Yafo's municipal election history. The list secured three seats on the city municipality.

== Political activity ==
=== Under "Ir LeKulanu" and "Anachnu HaIr" ===
Badran first joined the Tel Aviv-Yafo Municipality in 2016 under a rotation agreement within the Ir LeKulanu (All of Us Are the city) list., serving on the Subcommittee for Planning and Building. In 2018, he was elected to a full term on the municipality as a member of the Anachnu HaIr (All of Us Are the city) list, serving on both the Committee for Jaffa Affairs and the Business Licensing Committee.

During his tenure, Badran spearheaded the passage of a municipal bylaw requiring bilingual signage in Hebrew and Arabic throughout the city, in response to Basic Law: Israel as the Nation-State of the Jewish People. Badran also opposed the appointment of Arnon Giladi, a Likud representative suspected of criminal offenses, as the municipality's representative on the intermunicipal committee overseeing the Ben Gurion Airport master plan.

Badran has been actively involved in addressing housing issues affecting Jaffa's Arab population, opposing the eviction of residents and advocating for the formal recognition of their land rights. During his first term on the city municipality, he spearheaded an urban renewal project in Ajami, Jaffa. The project added approximately 200 new housing units and improved 100 existing units. In 2021, Badran promoted the Green House initiative (HaBayit HaYarok), aimed at improving affordable housing in the neighborhood.

In April 2022, Badran, Shula Keshet, and other members of Anachnu HaIr (We Are the city) petitioned for the evacuation of Tel Aviv central bus station, prompting an agreement to relocate half its operations by 2023 and plans for its full closure by 2026.

=== Jewish-Arab activism ===
Badran participated in the 2023 Israeli judicial reform protests, opposing the government's proposed judicial reforms. He also led joint Jewish-Arab demonstrations at Clock Square alongside the Anti-Occupation Bloc.

In October 2023, he spearheaded an initiative to establish a joint Jewish-Arab civilian patrol in Jaffa, aimed at maintaining coexistence and cooperation between the city's Jewish and Arab communities during the Gaza war.

=== Tel Aviv municipal elections ===
In September 2023, Badran announced his candidacy for mayor of Tel Aviv-Yafo, but withdrew from the race shortly before the election. The list he headed received more votes than any previous list led by an Arab resident of Jaffa in the history of Tel Aviv-Yafo's municipal elections.

In June 2026, the "Kulanu HaIr" faction signed a coalition agreement with the Tel Aviv Echat (Tel Aviv One) party, under which Badran was appointed Deputy Mayor of Tel Aviv-Yafo, overseeing housing and community affairs in Jaffa. He became the second Arab resident to hold this position in the city's history. The agreement also provided for the establishment of a municipal steering committee for Jaffa, chaired by Badran, and committed the municipality to withholding financial support from organizations promoting racism or discrimination.
