= Akram Hasson =

Israeli Druze politician

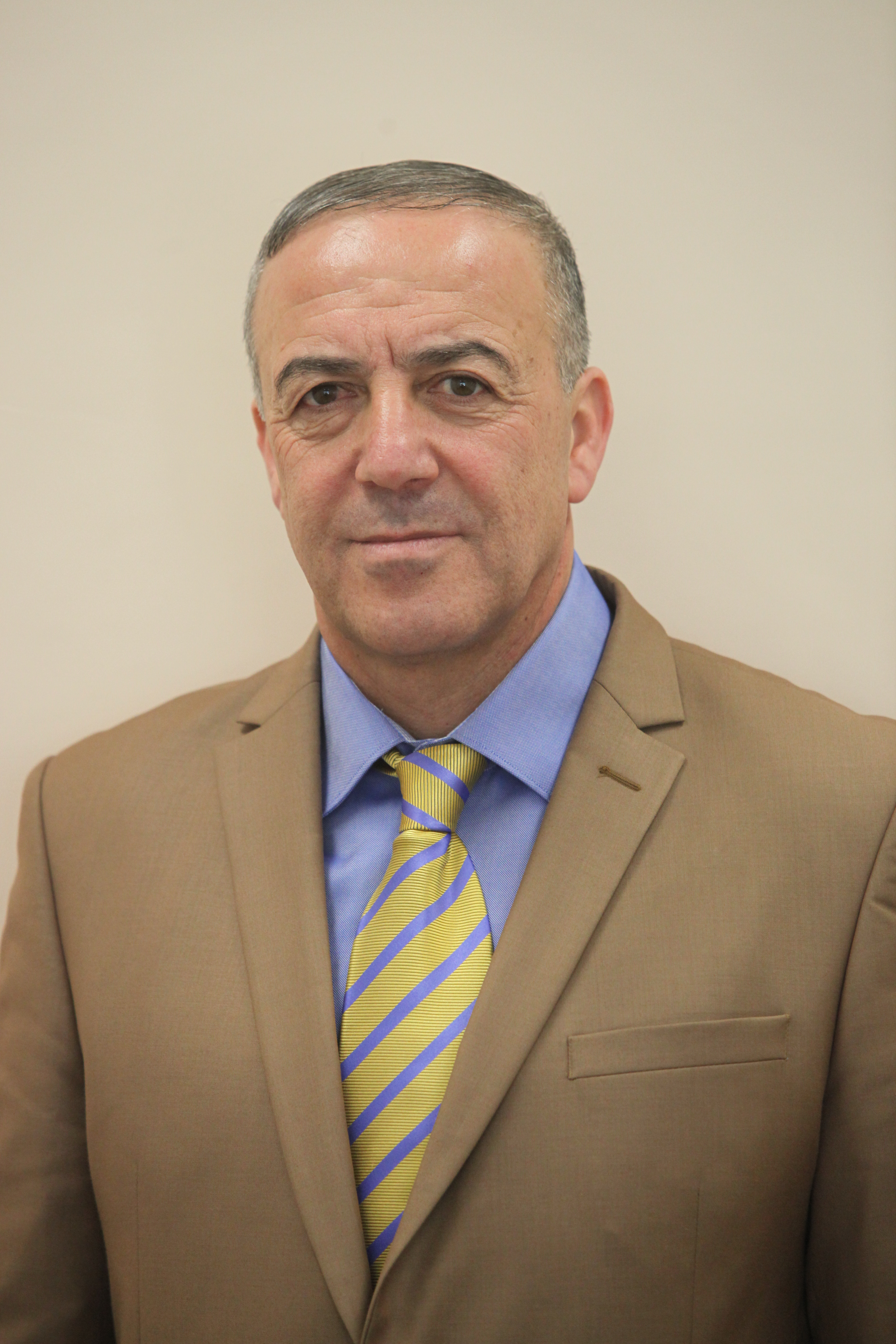
- Hasson in 2016

Faction represented in the Knesset
- 2012–2013: Kadima
- 2016–2019: Kulanu
- 2025–2026: New Hope

Personal details
- Born: 2 July 1959 (age 67) Daliyat al-Karmel, Israel

Akram Hasson (Arabic: أكرم حسون, Hebrew: אכרם חסון; born 2 July 1959) is an Israeli Druze politician who served as a member of the Knesset representing three different parties: his first stance was as MK for Kadima between 2012 and 2013, and then as an MK for Kulanu from 2016 to 2019, and finally for New Hope from 2025 th 2026. In 2015, Hasson became Kadima's last leader, marking the first time a Druze had led a Jewish party.

== Career ==
After doing his national service in the Israel Defense Forces between 1978 and 1981, Hasson worked as Director of Youth and Sports at a local council. The following year he briefly worked as a teacher in a high school in Daliyat al-Karmel and the prison system, before starting work at a law firm in Haifa. He left the firm in 1986 and became director of the Daliyat al-Karmel community centre. In 1989 he became Deputy Mayor of the city, a position he held until 1998.

In 1996 he graduated with a BA in education, gaining a master's degree in business and education administration the following year. In 1997 he became a headteacher, before working as the Director of the Israeli branch of the University of Lincoln from 1998 until 2001. In 2002 he was awarded a PhD. Between 2003 and 2008 he served as mayor of Carmel City and a member of the Planning and Building Committee in Haifa. Since 2005 he been a member of the Committee for Changing the System of Government in Israel.

He was placed 35th on the Kadima list for the 2009 Knesset elections. Although the party won only 28 seats, Hasson entered the Knesset in May 2012 as a replacement for Gideon Ezra, who had died of lung cancer. In December 2012 he became the first non-Jewish recipient of the Golden Inkwell Word prize, awarded by the Hebrew Writers Association in Israel. Hasson was awarded the prize after promoting legislation to preserve the Hebrew language by ensuring that all signage is primarily in Hebrew and that any speeches made abroad by government officials must be in Hebrew.

Placed eighth on the Kadima list for the 2013 elections, he lost his seat when the party was reduced to two MKs. After party leader Shaul Mofaz retired from politics on 27 January 2015; Hasson was elected on the same day to replace him, becoming the first Druze leader of a Jewish party. However, two days later he joined the new Kulanu list for the 2015 elections, being placed twelfth on the party list. Although the party won only ten seats in the elections, Hasson returned to the Knesset in January 2016 as a replacement for party leader Moshe Kahlon, who had resigned under the Norwegian Law.

Hasson was placed seventh on the Kulanu list in the April 2019 election, losing his seat as the party was reduced to 4 seats.

Hasson was placed sixteenth on the National Unity list in the 2022 election, but was not elected as the party won 12 seats. In the 2024 municipal elections, Hasson ran for the leadership of Daliyat al-Karmel, but lost to incumbent Rafiq Halbi.

Hasson was expected to become a Knesset member in July 2025, following Gideon Sa'ar's submittal of his Knesset resignation on 8 July 2025. Hasson became an MK on 10 July 2025, though according to Ynet, he was sworn in on 14 July.

== Personal life ==
Hasson resides in Daliyat al-Karmel and has five children.

== See also ==
- List of Israeli Druze
