= Meitav (military unit) =

Coordinates: 32°2′46.87″N 34°51′2.18″E

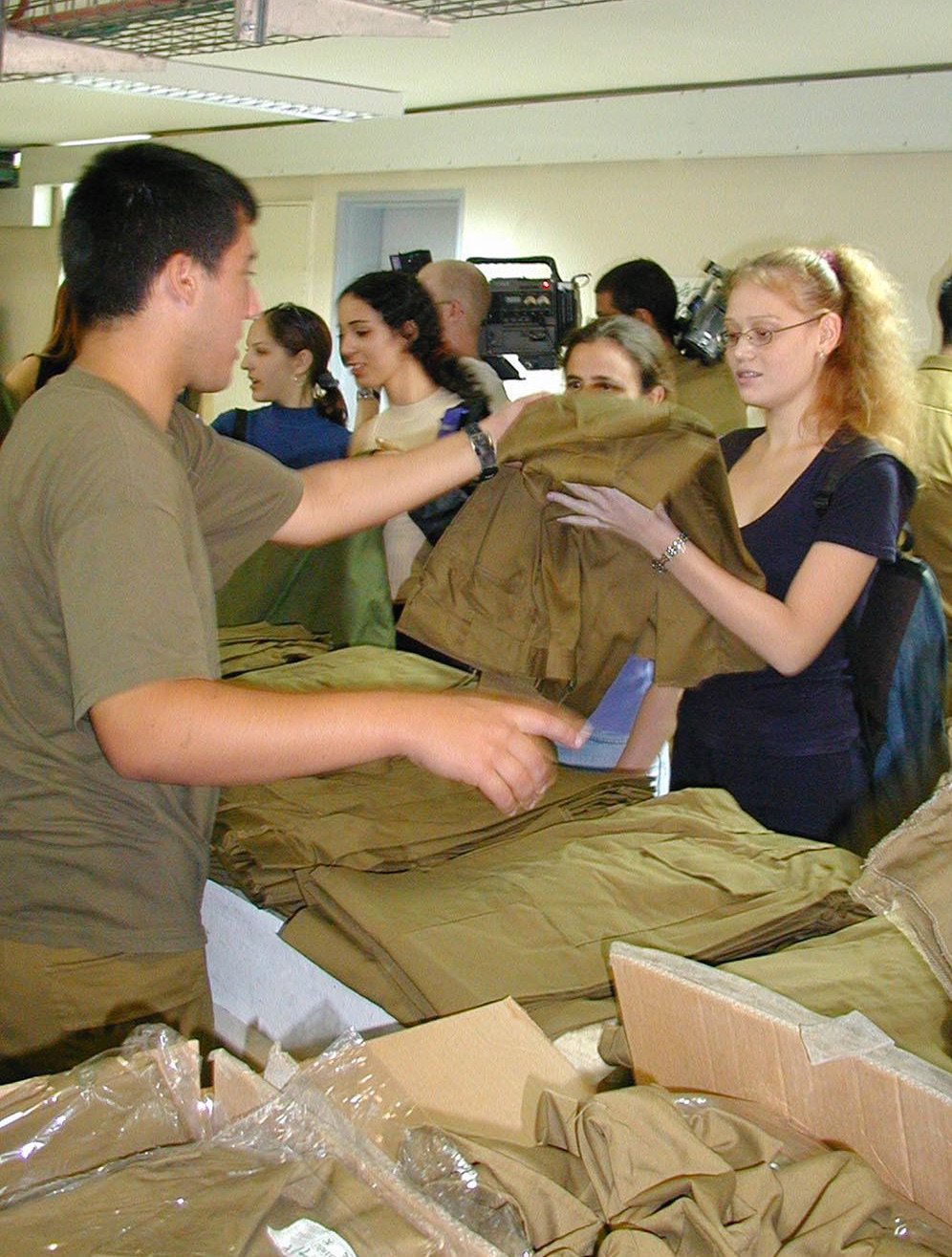
A female recruit receives her uniform at the Induction Center as part of her induction process. The process includes background checks, taking a photo for the military identification card, receiving equipment and more.

Meitav (Hebrew: מיטב) is an Israel Defense Forces (IDF) unit responsible for overseeing new IDF recruits and sorting them into their respective corps or basic training bases, similarly to USMEPCOM in the U.S. military. Other responsibilities include (but are not limited to) initial allocation of basic gear and discharging soldiers at the end of their service.

Meitav was created in May 2006 by merging the Bakum (בסיס קליטה ומיון, Bsis Klita UMiyun lit. Reception and Sorting Base) and the Minhag (מנהל הגיוס, Minhal HaGiyus, lit. Recruitment Administration). Meitav's headquarters are located at the Tel HaShomer military base, and its current commander as of March 2023 is Colonel Alon Matzliah.

In 2010, Meitav was the third-largest IDF unit, with 1,026 soldiers.

== History ==
With the founding of the IDF, Meitav was called Kelet (Hebrew: קלט) and was under the jurisdiction of the manpower branch of the Ministry of Defense. It was located in Tzrifin. The Kelet unit, which inducted soldiers, was separate from the sorting unit/base, which was located in the Kiryat Meir base in Tel Aviv. In the 1950s, the two units were merged into the Bakum, and moved to Tel HaShomer.

In 1966, the jurisdiction of the Bakum passed from the Defense Ministry to the army.

== Recruitment Offices ==
Under Meitav's responsibility is the management of 5 regional recruitment offices across the country (Tel Hashomer, Beer Sheva, Tiberias, Haifa and Jerusalem. The recruitment offices are in charge of the sorting process for service, including Tzav Rishon, medical exams, interviews and tests.
