= List of members of the seventeenth Knesset =

17th Knesset
←	16th	18th	→

Overview
- Legislative body: Knesset
- Jurisdiction: Israel
- Meeting place: Knesset building
- Term: 16 April 2006 – 10 November 2008
- Election: 28 March 2006
- Government: 31st government

Knesset
- President: Moshe Katsav; Shimon Peres
- Prime minister: Ehud Olmert
- Speaker: Dalia Itzik

The following is a list of the members of the seventeenth Knesset, elected on 28 March 2006 and inaugurated 4 May 2006, and their replacements.

== Knesset members ==
Party	Member	Position
Kadima (29)	Ehud Olmert	Prime Minister
Kadima (29)	Tzipi Livni	Acting Prime Minister, Minister of Foreign Affairs
Kadima (29)	Meir Sheetrit	Minister of the Interior
Kadima (29)	Avi Dichter	Minister of Internal Security
Kadima (29)	Marina Solodkin	
Kadima (29)	Haim Ramon	Vice Prime Minister, Minister in the Prime Minister's Office
Kadima (29)	Shaul Mofaz	Deputy Prime Minister, Minister of Transportation
Kadima (29)	Tzachi Hanegbi	Chairman, Security and Foreign Affairs Committee
Kadima (29)	Avraham Hirschson	
Kadima (29)	Gideon Ezra	Minister of Environmental Affairs
Kadima (29)	Roni Bar-On	Minister of Finance
Kadima (29)	Dalia Itzik	Speaker of the Knesset
Kadima (29)	Ze'ev Boim	Minister of Housing and Construction
Kadima (29)	Yaakov Edri	Minister of Negev and Galilee Development
Kadima (29)	Ze'ev Elkin	
Kadima (29)	Majalli Wahabi	Deputy Speaker of the Kenesset
Kadima (29)	Ruhama Avraham	Minister without Portfolio responsible for Knesset liaison, Minister of Tourism
Kadima (29)	Menachem Ben-Sasson	Chairman, Committee on Law and Constitution
Kadima (29)	Eli Aflalo	Minister of Immigrant Absorption
Kadima (29)	David Tal	Chairman, House Committee
Kadima (29)	Ronit Tirosh	
Kadima (29)	Otniel Schneller	Deputy Speaker of Knesset
Kadima (29)	Michael Nudelman	Chairman, Committee on Immigration, Absorption and the Diaspora
Kadima (29)	Amira Dotan	
Kadima (29)	Yoel Hasson	
Kadima (29)	Shai Hermesh	
Kadima (29)	Isaac Ben-Israel	
Kadima (29)	Yohanan Plesner	
Kadima (29)	Shlomo Molla	
Labor-Meimad (19)	Amir Peretz	
Labor-Meimad (19)	Isaac Herzog	Minister of Welfare
Labor-Meimad (19)	Ophir Pines-Paz	Chairman, Committee on Interior Affairs and the Environment
Labor-Meimad (19)	Avishay Braverman	Chairman, Finance Committee
Labor-Meimad (19)	Yuli Tamir	Minister of Education
Labor-Meimad (19)	Ami Ayalon	Minister without Portfolio
Labor-Meimad (19)	Eitan Cabel	
Labor-Meimad (19)	Binyamin Ben-Eliezer	Minister of National Infrastructure
Labor-Meimad (19)	Shelly Yachimovich	
Labor-Meimad (19)	Michael Melchior	Chairman, Committee on Education, Culture and Sports
Labor-Meimad (19)	Matan Vilnai	Deputy Minister of Defense
Labor-Meimad (19)	Colette Avital	Deputy Speaker of Knesset
Labor-Meimad (19)	Nadia Hilou	Chairwoman, Committee on the Rights of the Child
Labor-Meimad (19)	Shalom Simhon	Minister of Agriculture
Labor-Meimad (19)	Orit Noked	
Labor-Meimad (19)	Yoram Marciano	
Labor-Meimad (19)	Raleb Majadele	Minister of Science, Culture and Sports
Labor-Meimad (19)	Shakhiv Shana'an	
Labor-Meimad (19)	Leon Litinetsky	
Shas (12)	Eli Yishai	Deputy Prime Minister and Minister of Industry, Commerce and Employment
Shas (12)	Yitzhak Cohen	Minister without Portfolio
Shas (12)	Amnon Cohen	Deputy Speaker of Knesset
Shas (12)	Meshulam Nahari	Minister without Portfolio
Shas (12)	Ariel Atias	Minister of Communications
Shas (12)	David Azulai	
Shas (12)	Yitzhak Vaknin	
Shas (12)	Nissim Ze'ev	
Shas (12)	Ya'akov Margi	
Shas (12)	Emil Amsalem	
Shas (12)	Avraham Michaeli	
Shas (12)	Mazor Bahaina	
Likud (12)	Benjamin Netanyahu	Chairman of the Opposition
Likud (12)	Silvan Shalom	
Likud (12)	Moshe Kahlon	
Likud (12)	Gilad Erdan	
Likud (12)	Gideon Sa'ar	
Likud (12)	Michael Eitan	Chairman, State Control Committee
Likud (12)	Reuven Rivlin	
Likud (12)	Yuval Steinitz	
Likud (12)	Limor Livnat	
Likud (12)	Yisrael Katz	
Likud (12)	Haim Katz	
Likud (12)	Yuli Edelstein	Deputy Speaker of Knesset
Yisrael Beiteinu (11)	Avigdor Lieberman	
Yisrael Beiteinu (11)	Israel Hasson	Chairman, Economy Committee
Yisrael Beiteinu (11)	Yosef Shagal	
Yisrael Beiteinu (11)	Esterina Tartman	
Yisrael Beiteinu (11)	Stas Misezhnikov	
Yisrael Beiteinu (11)	Sofa Landver	Chairwoman, Public Petitions Committee
Yisrael Beiteinu (11)	Yitzhak Aharonovich	
Yisrael Beiteinu (11)	Robert Ilatov	
Yisrael Beiteinu (11)	Alex Miller	
Yisrael Beiteinu (11)	Lia Shemtov	Chairwoman, Committee on Advancing the Status of Women
Yisrael Beiteinu (11)	David Rotem	Deputy Speaker of Knesset
National Union-NRP (9)	Binyamin Elon	
National Union-NRP (9)	Zevulun Orlev	Chairman, Committee on Science and Technology
National Union-NRP (9)	Zvi Hendel	
National Union-NRP (9)	Effi Eitam	
National Union-NRP (9)	Nissan Slomiansky	
National Union-NRP (9)	Yitzhak Levi	Deputy Speaker of Knesset
National Union-NRP (9)	Eliyahu Gabai	
National Union-NRP (9)	Aryeh Eldad	
National Union-NRP (9)	Uri Ariel	
Gil (7) (Note: The Gil parliamentary group split in April 2008, with MKs Sharoni, Marom and Glazer forming the Justice for the Elderly faction. In October 2008, Sharoni and Marom reunited with Gil, leaving Glazer to form The Right Way parliamentary group.)	Rafi Eitan	Minister of Retiree Affairs
Gil (7)	Yaakov Ben-Yezri	Minister of Health
Gil (7)	Yitzhak Galanti	Chairman, Committee on Labor, Welfare and Health
Gil (7)	Yitzhak Ziv	Deputy Speaker of Knesset
Gil (7)	Moshe Sharoni	
Gil (7)	Sara Marom	
Gil (7)	Elhanan Glazer	Left party to establish The Right Way
United Torah Judaism (6)	Yaakov Litzman	
United Torah Judaism (6)	Meir Porush	
United Torah Judaism (6)	Moshe Gafni	
United Torah Judaism (6)	Shmuel Halpert	
United Torah Judaism (6)	Uri Maklev	
United Torah Judaism (6)	Yehoshua Menachem Pollack	
Meretz-Yachad (5)	Haim Oron	Chairman, Ethics Committee
Meretz-Yachad (5)	Ran Cohen	
Meretz-Yachad (5)	Zehava Gal-On	
Meretz-Yachad (5)	Avshalom Vilan	
Meretz-Yachad (5)	Tzvia Greenfield	
Ra'am (4)	Ibrahim Sarsur	
Ra'am (4)	Ahmad Tibi	
Ra'am (4)	Taleb el-Sana	
Ra'am (4)	Abbas Zakour (Note: Labor successfully filed a lawsuit, alleging electoral fraud in several Arab settlements and requesting an additional seat at the expense of the United Arab List. Zakour was replaced by Labor's Shakib Shanan.)	
Hadash (3)	Mohammad Barakeh	Deputy Speaker of Knesset
Hadash (3)	Hana Sweid	
Hadash (3)	Dov Khenin	
Balad (3)	Jamal Zahalka	
Balad (3)	Wasil Taha	
Balad (3)	Said Nafa	

=== Replacements ===
Name	Party	Replaced by	Remarks
Uriel Reichman	Kadima	Shai Hermesh	Resigned on 20 April 2006 after the role of Minister of Education, promised to him by Ariel Sharon, was given to Labor.
Natan Sharansky	Likud	Haim Katz	Sharansky retired from politics and left the Knesset on 20 November 2006.
Yuri Stern	Yisrael Beiteinu	David Rotem	Stern died of cancer on 16 January 2007.
Dan Naveh	Likud	Yuli-Yoel Edelstein	Naveh resigned to go into business on 27 February 2007.
Azmi Bishara	Balad	Said Nafa	Bishara resigned from the Knesset on 22 April 2007 due to a police investigation into his activities during the 2006 Lebanon War.
Shimon Peres	Kadima	Isaac Ben-Israel	Peres resigned from the Knesset following his election as president on 13 June 2007.
Shlomo Breznitz	Kadima	Yohanan Plesner	Breznitz retired from politics and left the Knesset on 8 October 2007.
Avigdor Yitzhaki	Kadima	Shlomo Molla	Yitzhaki resigned from the Knesset on 7 February 2008 due to "serious doubts over Ehud Olmert's ability to lead the government in the wake of the Winograd Report".
Shlomo Benizri	Shas	Mazor Bahaina	Benizri resigned from the Knesset on 27 April 2008 after being convicted of bribery.
Efraim Sneh	Labor	Shakhiv Shana'an	Sneh resigned from the Knesset on 28 May 2008 as he left Labor to found his own party.
Danny Yatom	Labor	Leon Litinetsky	Yatom resigned from the Knesset on 30 June 2008 due to a lack of confidence in the government.
Ya'akov Cohen	United Torah Judaism	Uri Maklev	Cohen resigned from the Knesset due to a rotation agreement.
Yossi Beilin	Meretz-Yachad	Tzvia Greenfield	Beilin retired from politics and left the Knesset on 4 November 2008.
Avraham Ravitz	United Torah Judaism	Yehoshua Menachem Pollack	Ravitz died on 26 January 2009.

== See also ==
- List of Likud Knesset members
- Arab members of the Knesset
