= Labor and Welfare Committee =

The Labor and Welfare Committee of the Knesset deals with labor, employment and welfare matters, which operates continuously from the first Knesset until the dissolution of the 20th Knesset. After not being filled during the 21st and 22nd Knessets due to the lack of a government, in the 23rd Knesset, the Knesset plenum approved the proposal of the organizing committee to establish it as a special committee on welfare and labor that will operate until the establishment of the standing committees. The special committee was headed by Aida Touma-Suleiman from the Joint List, until Haim Katz was elected to chair the committee. Following the formation of the thirty-sixth government of Israel, the committee was split into the Labor and Welfare Committee, and the Health Committee.

== Labor, Welfare and Health committee chairs ==
Portrait	Chair	Took office	Left office	Party	Ref.
Akiva Govrin	Akiva Govrin (1902–1980)	1949	1951	Mapai	
Pinhas Lavon	Pinhas Lavon (1904–1976)	1949	1951	Mapai	
Avraham Rakanti	Avraham Rakanti (1888–1980)	1949	1951	Herut	
Akiva Govrin	Akiva Govrin (1902–1980)	1951	1955	Mapai	
Binyamin Avniel	Binyamin Avniel (1906–1993)	1951	1955	Herut	
Aryeh Altman	Aryeh Altman (1902–1982)	1951	1955	Herut	
Akiva Govrin	Akiva Govrin (1902–1980)	1955	1959	Mapai	
Moshe Erem	Moshe Erem (1896–1978)	1955	1959	Ahdut HaAvoda	
Akiva Govrin	Akiva Govrin (1902–1980)	1959	1961	Mapai	
Nahum Nir	Nahum Nir (1884–1968)	1959	1961	Ahdut HaAvoda	
Akiva Govrin	Akiva Govrin (1902–1980)	1961	1965	Mapai	
Moshe Baram	Moshe Baram (1911–1986)	1961	1965	Mapai	
Nahum Nir	Nahum Nir (1884–1968)	1961	1965	Ahdut HaAvoda	
Moshe Baram	Moshe Baram (1911–1986)	1965	1969	Labor	
Moshe Erem	Moshe Erem (1896–1978)	1965	1969	Labor	
Shlomo Rosen	Shlomo Rosen (1905–1985)	1965	1969	Mapam	
Shoshana Arbeli-Almozlino	Shoshana Arbeli-Almozlino (1926–2015)	1969	1974	Alignment	
Haika Grossman	Haika Grossman (1919–1996)	1969	1974	Alignment	
Shoshana Arbeli-Almozlino	Shoshana Arbeli-Almozlino (1926–2015)	1974	1977	Alignment	
Haika Grossman	Haika Grossman (1919–1996)	1974	1977	Mapam	
Menachem Porush	Menachem Porush (1916–2010)	1977	1984	Agudat Yisrael	
Ora Namir	Ora Namir (1930–2019)	1984	1992	Labor	
Yossi Katz	Yossi Katz (born 1949)	1992	1996	Labor	
Amir Peretz	Amir Peretz (born 1952)	1992	1996	Labor	
Maxim Levy	Maxim Levy (1950–2002)	1996	1999	Gesher (1996 political party)	
David Tal	David Tal (born 1950)	1999	2003	Shas	
Yair Peretz	Yair Peretz (born 1954)	1999	2003	Shas	
Shaul Yahalom	Shaul Yahalom (born 1947)	2003	2006	Mafdal	
Haim Katz	Haim Katz (born 1947)	2003	2006	Likud	
Moshe Sharoni	Moshe Sharoni (1929–2020)	2006	2009	Dor	
Yitzhak Galanti	Yitzhak Galanti (1937–2012)	2006	2009	Dor	
Haim Katz	Haim Katz (born 1947)	2009	2015	Likud	
Eli Alaluf	Eli Alaluf (born 1945)	2015	2019	Kulanu	
Haim Katz	Haim Katz (born 1947)	2020	2021	Likud	

== Labor and Welfare committee chairs ==
Portrait	Chair	Took office	Left office	Party	Ref.
Efrat Rayten	Efrat Rayten (born 1972)	2021	2022	Labor	
Yisrael Eichler	Yisrael Eichler (born 1955)	2023	2025	UTJ	
Michal Waldiger	Michal Waldiger (born 1969)	2025		Religious Zionism	
