= Presidency of Shimon Peres =

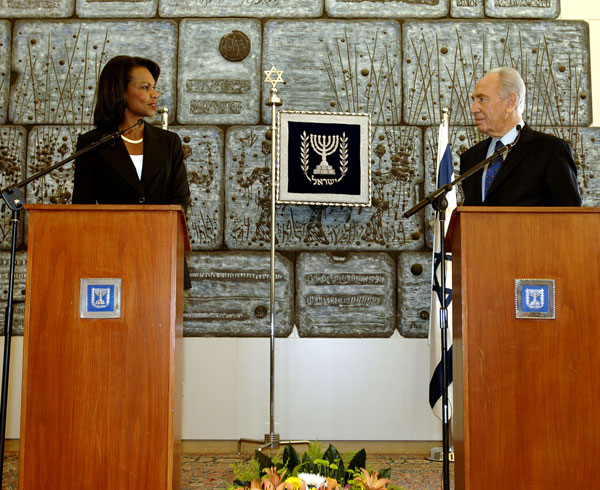
- Peres with Condoleezza Rice at the President's House in Jerusalem, 2007
- Presidency of Shimon Peres; 15 July 2007 – 24 July 2014
- Premier: Ehud Olmert, Benjamin Netanyahu
- Party: Kadima
- Election: 2007
- Seat: Beit HaNassi
- Presidential Standard

The Presidency of Shimon Peres, the ninth President of Israel, began after the 2007 Israeli presidential election on 13 June 2007 in which Peres defeated Reuven Rivlin and Colette Avital. Peres was sworn in as president on 15 July 2007. and served until Reuven Rivlin was sworn in as his successor on 24 July 2014.

Peres was 90 years old when his presidency ended, which made him at the time the world's oldest head of state.

== 2007 Presidential election ==
On 13 June 2007, Peres was elected President of the State of Israel by the Knesset. 58 of 120 members of the Knesset voted for him in the first round (whereas 38 voted for Reuven Rivlin, and 21 for Colette Avital). His opponents then backed Peres in the second round and 86 members of the Knesset voted in his favor, while 23 objected. He resigned from his role as a Member of the Knesset the same day, having been a member since November 1959 (except for a three-month period in early 2006), the longest serving in Israeli political history. Peres was sworn in as president on 15 July 2007.

== Olmert Government ==
=== Israeli Presidential Conference ===
"Peres started the Israeli Presidential Conference in 2008. It is a high level conference being held in Jerusalem previously once every 18 months and more recently annually. The gathering, titled "Facing Tomorrow", was meant to bring together the world's top leaders and thinkers in a wide variety of fields including policy, energy, science, economics, culture, art, religion and thought to navigate the most pressing global challenges ahead".

=== Address to the Grand National Assembly of Turkey ===
On 13 November 2007, Peres became the first Israeli president to speak before the legislature of a Muslim country when he addressed the Grand National Assembly of Turkey.

=== Valley of Peace initiative ===
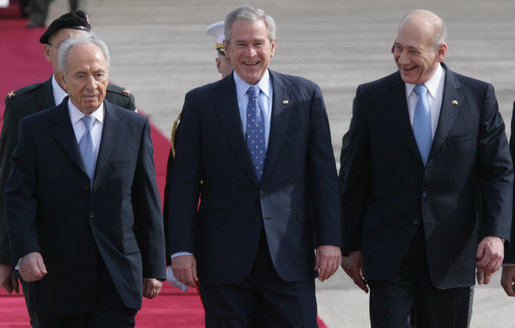
George W. Bush, Ehud Olmert and Peres in Tel Aviv, 9 January 2008

In early 2008, plans were announced by Peres for a joint economic effort in four locations in the West Bank, in a plan known as the Valley of Peace initiative. This effort was to include joint economic and industrial projects, and a jointly built university, with investment from several countries, including Turkey and Japan.

=== Resignation of Ehud Olmert ===
Prime Minister Olmert presented his resignation to Peres at the president's residence in Jerusalem on 21 September 2008. On 23 September 2008, Peres asked Tzipi Livni, leader of the Kadima party, to form a new government.

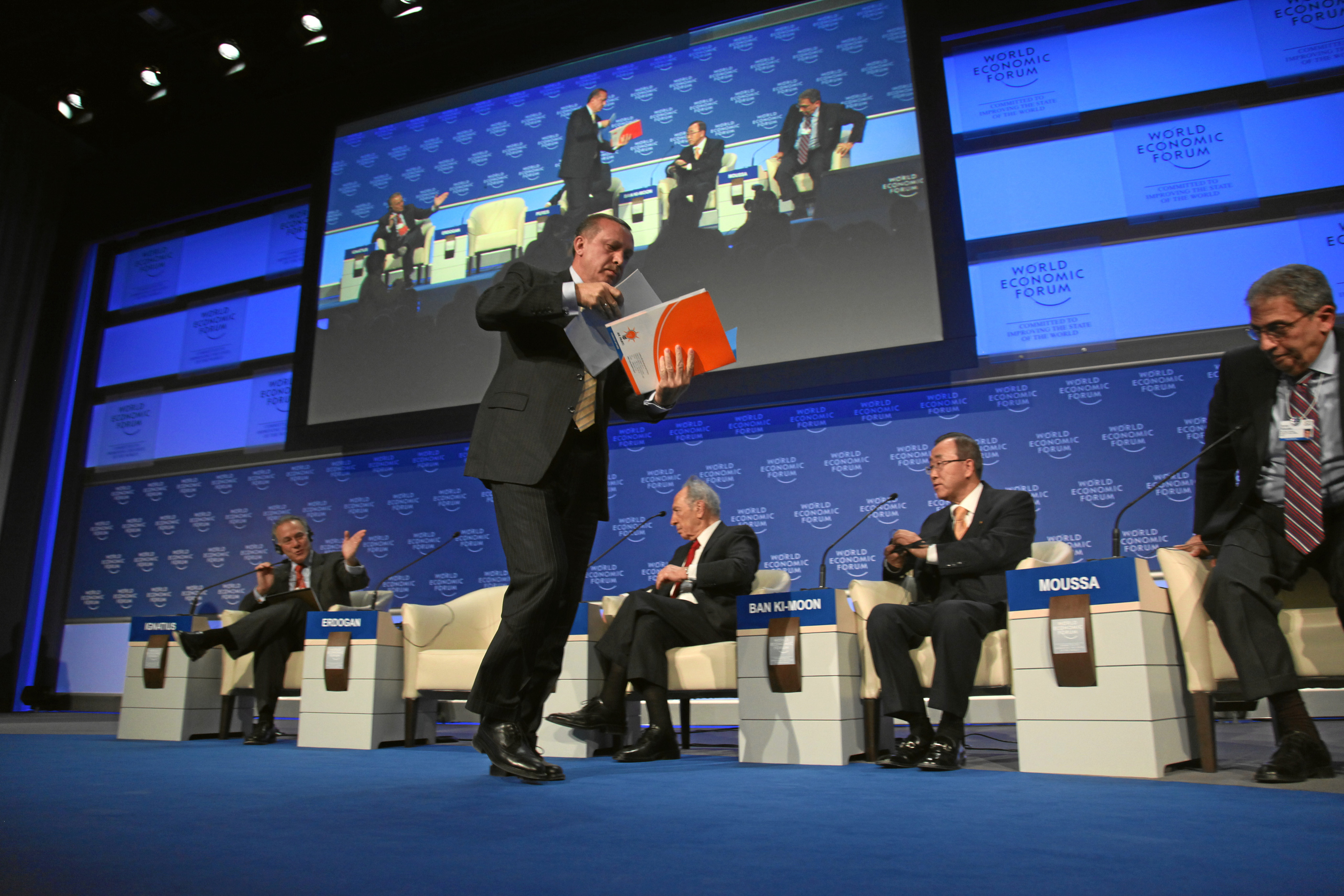
Erdoğan walks out of the session at the World Economic Forum, after clashing with Peres over the Gaza war.

=== 2009 World Economic Forum ===
In January 2009, at the World Economic Forum in Davos, Switzerland, Peres was involved in an angry exchange with Turkish Prime Minister Recep Tayyip Erdoğan. The two were part of a panel discussion that also featured the secretary general of the Arab League, Amr Moussa, and the UN Secretary-General Ban Ki-moon, when Erdoğan became angry after moderator David Ignatius of the Washington Post refused to allow him to rebut the Israeli president's comments about the 2008–2009 Israel–Gaza conflict. Resisting attempts to end the session, Erdoğan told Peres "When it comes to killing, you know well how to kill", then stormed off-stage, vowing never to return to Davos. The Turkish Anadolu Agency later reported that Peres phoned Erdoğan a few minutes later, apologizing for any misunderstanding. At home and throughout the Middle East, Erdoğan was feted afterwards as a hero.

=== Pope Benedict XVI's 2009 visit to Israel ===
In February, Olmert discussed Pope Benedict XVI's 2009 visit with his Cabinet. Olmert informed the cabinet that in May, Israel will receive Benedict as a special visitor and that Peres will act as Benedict's "national host" as they visit various sites around the country."

== Netanyahu Governments ==
=== 2009 Israeli Legislative Election ===
On 18 February 2009, Peres began consultations with delegations from Kadima and Likud to discuss the creation of a coalition after the 2009 Israeli legislative election. On 20 February, Peres chose Benjamin Netanyahu to form a new Israeli government. In choosing Netanyahu, with Kadima having won 28 seats to 27 for Likud, Peres broke with the presidential tradition of asking the leader of the party with the most seats in the Knesset to form a government.

On 24 February 2009, after presiding over the swearing-in ceremony of Knesset members in Jerusalem, Peres opened Israel's Eighteenth Knesset.

On 20 March 2009, Peres met with Prime Minister-designate Netanyahu, following his appeal for an extension of the period of time given to form a coalition government. Peres granted the request, granting Netanyahu a 14-day extension to form a government by 3 April 2009.

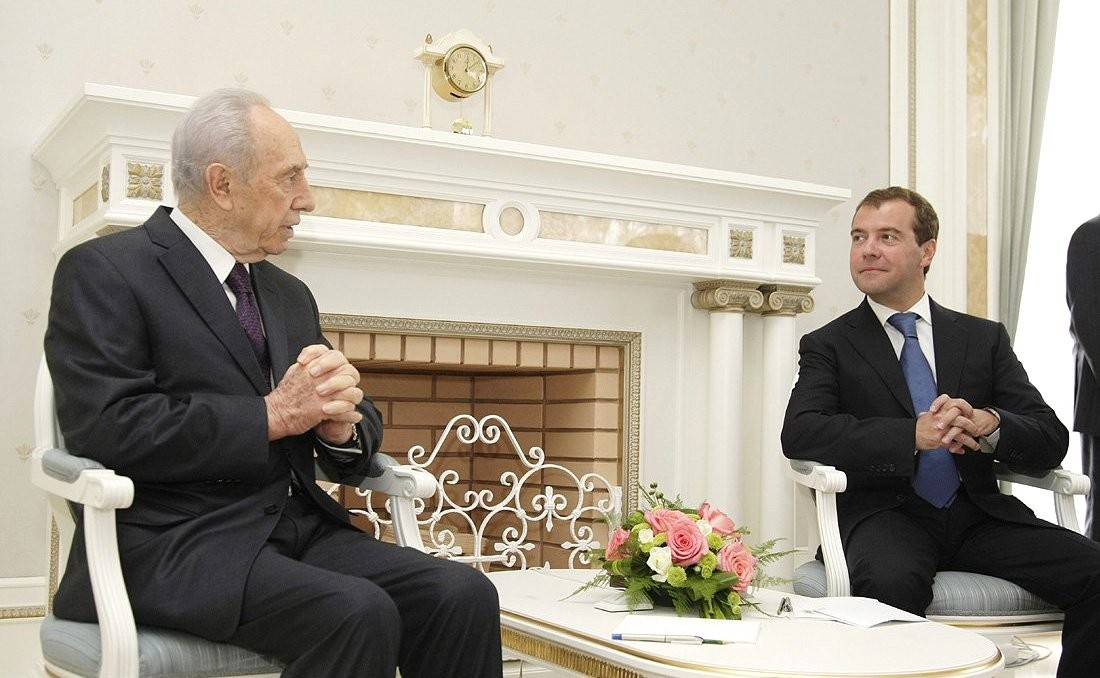
Peres with Russian President Dmitry Medvedev in Moscow, 18 August 2009

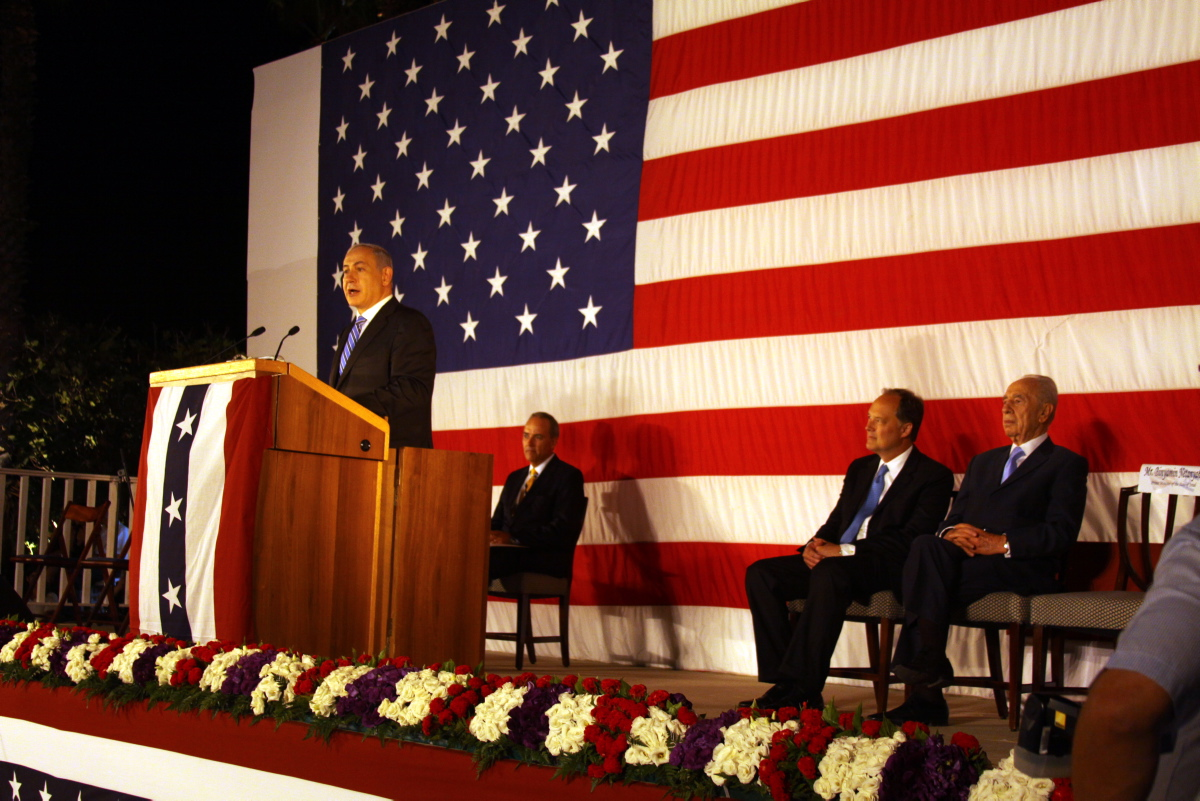
Independence Day reception at the Residence of the U.S. Ambassador to Israel, 30 June 2011

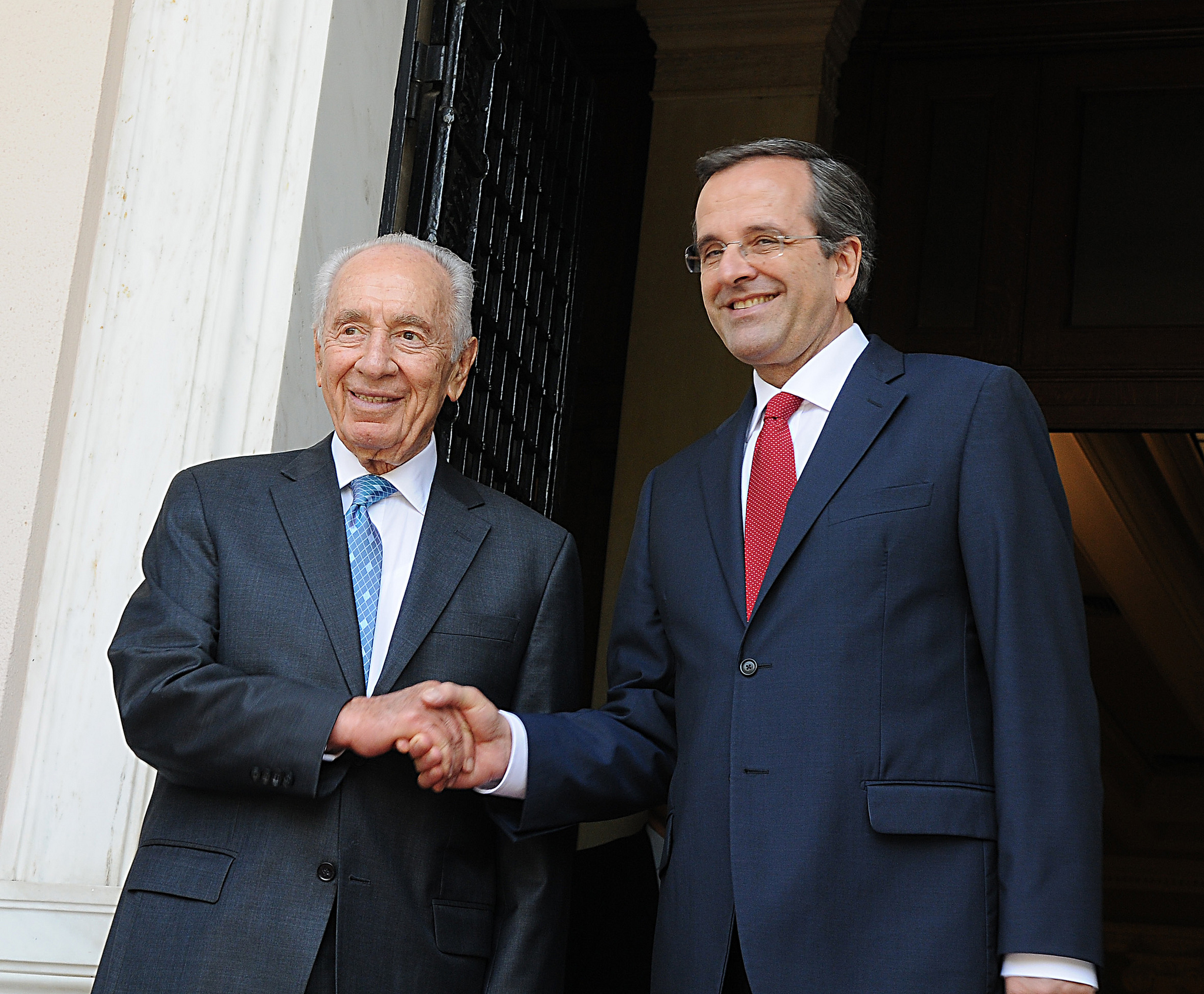
Peres with Greek Prime Minister Antonis Samaras in Athens, 6 August 2012

=== Thirty-second government ===
On 1 April 2009, upon forming a new government, Netanyahu was inaugurated in a ceremony at the presidential residence. During the ceremony, Peres urged him to advance the peace process.

In a departure from Israeli diplomatic norms, Peres met with US President Barack Obama, in Washington D.C., before Netanyahu met with him.

Thomas Friedman reported that Peres gave a video interview to a delegation at the Gulf States Security Summit in November 2013, in Abu Dhabi. Peres, sitting in his Jerusalem office, was interviewed by Under-Secretary-General of the United Nations Terje-Roed Larsen. In attendance in Abu Dhabi were the foreign ministers of 29 Arab and Muslim countries, as well as U.S. envoy Martin Indyk, and a son of King Abdullah of Saudi Arabia. The event marked a rare instance of contact between a senior Israeli official and representatives of the Muslim world.

=== Thirty-third government ===
In consultation meetings with Peres, six parties representing 82 Members of the Knesset (Likud-Yisrael Beiteinu, Yesh Atid, The Jewish Home, Shas, United Torah Judaism and Kadima) recommended that Netanyahu be asked to form a government, whilst the Labor Party, Hatnua, Meretz, Hadash, and the two Arab parties, Ra'am and Balad (38 Members of the Knesset) did not recommend anyone. On 2 February, Peres formally tasked Netanyahu with forming a government.

A coalition of Likud-Yisrael Beiteinu, Yesh Atid, the Jewish Home and Hatnua was announced on 14 March 2013. This coalition won a vote of confidence in the Knesset on 18 March and was sworn in later that day.

== Awards ==
In November 2008, Peres received an honorary knighthood of the Order of St. Michael and St. George from Queen Elizabeth II in Buckingham Palace in London. After the ceremony, Peres stated that he "was very moved to be an emissary to receive this honor on behalf of the State of Israel."

In June 2012, Peres received the Presidential Medal of Freedom from President of the United States Barack Obama.
