= Efrat Rayten =

Israeli politician

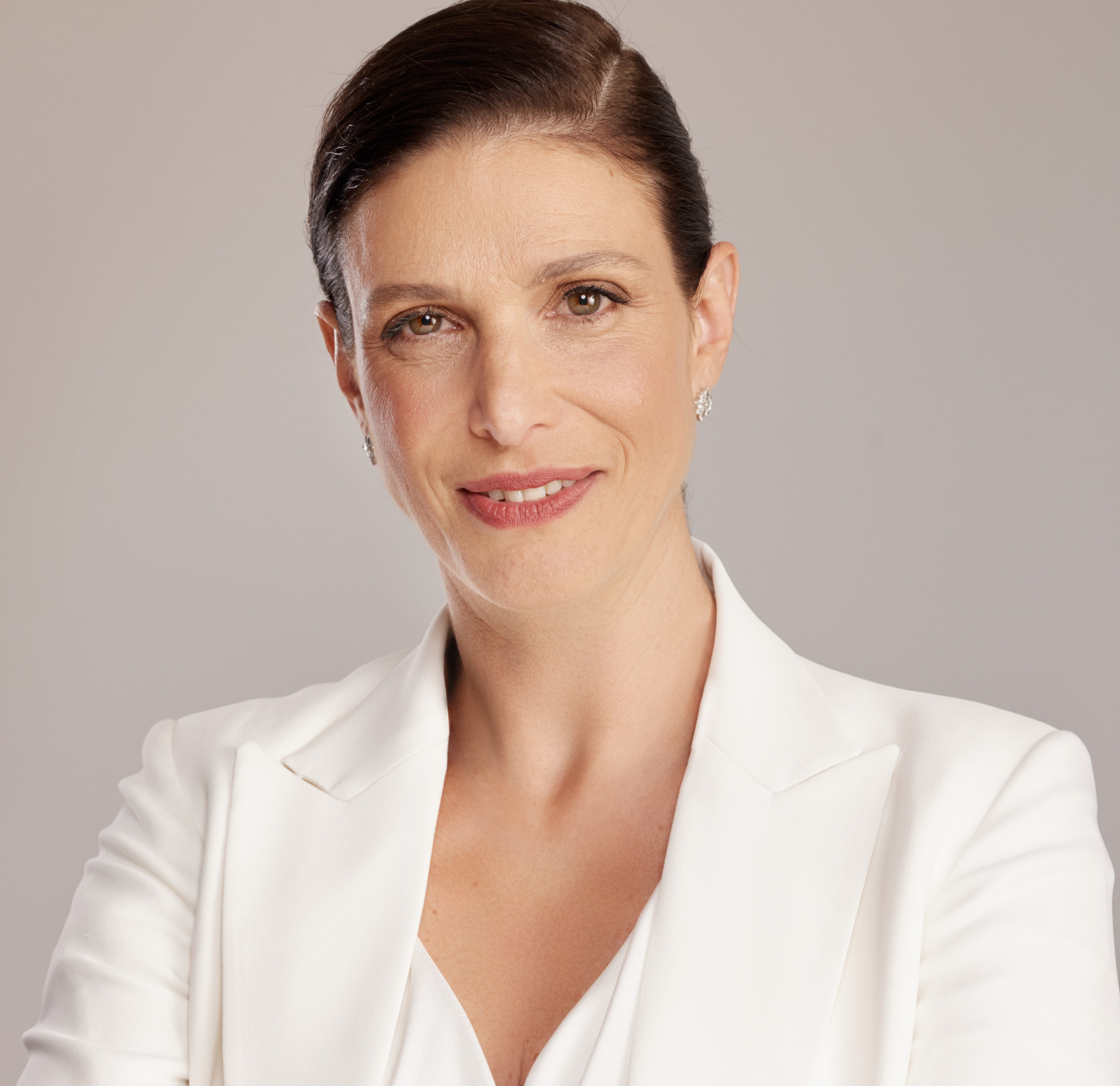
- Rayten in 2022

Faction represented in the Knesset
- 2021–2024: Labor Party
- 2024–: The Democrats

Personal details
- Born: 15 May 1972 (age 54) Haifa, Israel

Efrat Rayten-Marom (Hebrew: אֶפְרָת רַיְיטָן־מָרוֹם; born 15 May 1972) is an Israeli actress, lawyer and politician. She is currently a member of the Knesset for the Democrats and previously for the Israeli Labor Party. She previously chaired the Labor, Welfare and Health Committee and chaired the Labor Party's faction in the Knesset following the 2022 election.

== Biography ==
Rayten originally worked as an actress and television host, working as a TV presenter on the Children's Channel and Channel 10. However, she left the industry to become a lawyer. Having earned an LLB at the Academic Center for Law and Science in 2004, she was called to the bar in 2012 and became a partner at Goldfarb Seligman & Co. She represented families of children who died in a 2018 flood during a pre-military programme.

Prior to the 2021 elections she was placed fifth on the Labor Party list, and was elected to the Knesset as the party won seven seats. She was placed fourth on the Labor list for the 2022 elections and was re-elected as the party won four seats.

She had intended to stand as a candidate for the leadership of the Labor Party in the 2024 leadership election, but endorsed Yair Golan instead.

She previously chaired the Labor, Welfare and Health Committee.

In The Democrats primary elections held on 20 July 2026, ahead of the 2026 Israeli legislative election, Rayten came in at number four on the slate. She was re-elected after the party won eight seats.

Rayten lives in Tel Aviv.

== Filmography ==
- Rabies (2010)
