= Ayelet Frish =

Israeli commentator and businesswoman

- איילת פריש
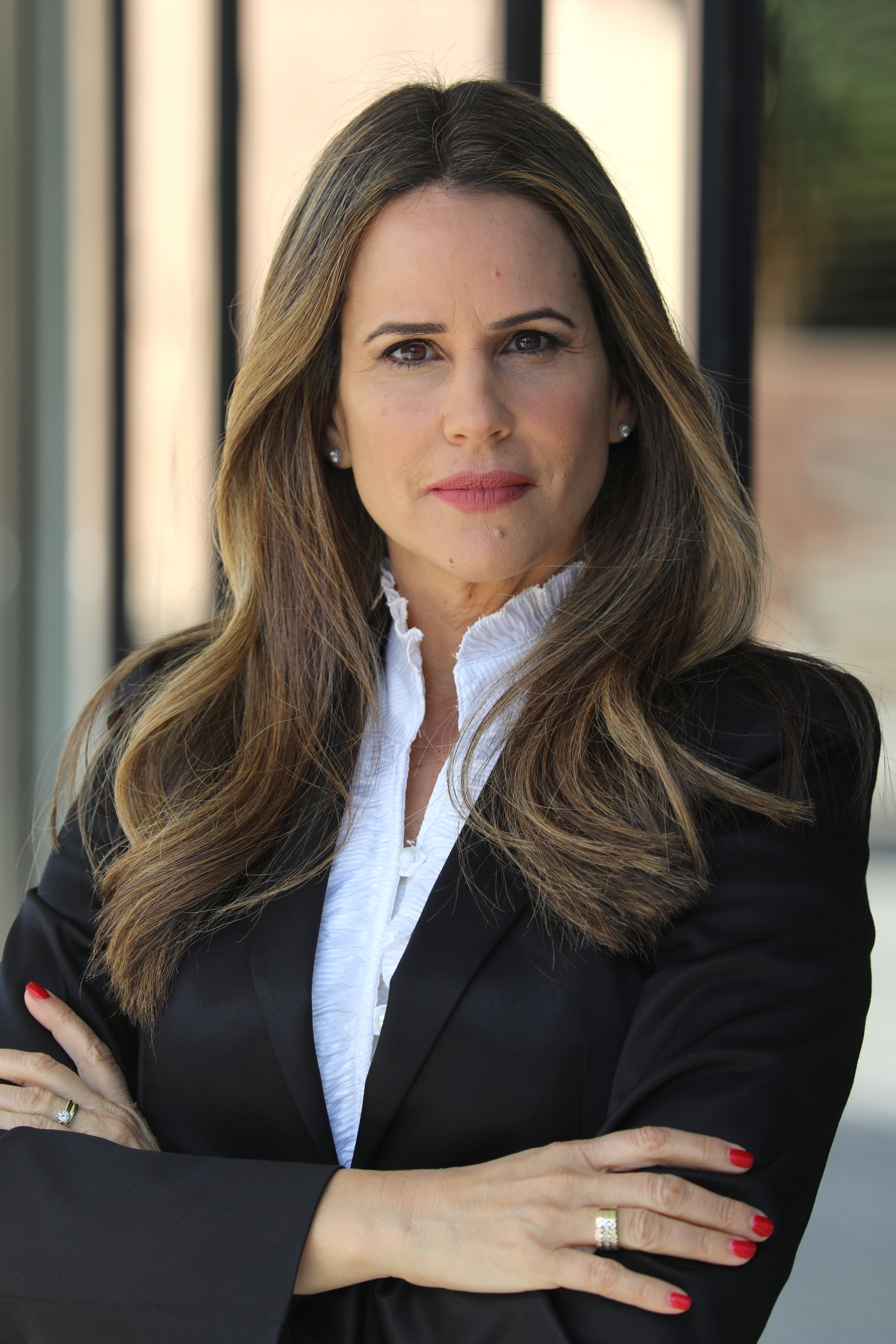
- Born: 12 August 1972 (age 53)
- Education: Master's degree
- Known for: Strategic consultant

Ayelet Frish (Hebrew: איילת פריש; born 13 August 1972) is an Israeli strategic consultant.

== Biography ==
Ayelet Frish was born Ayelet Boimal at kibbutz Lehavot Haviva.

In her early twenties Frish was appointed as the spokesperson of the Kibbutz Movement. In 1999, she was appointed as the spokesperson of the Speaker of the Israeli Parliament, Avraham Burg.

In 2004 Frish was appointed Head of Strategy for Shimon Peres during his role as Israel's Deputy Prime Minister and Minister for the Development of the Periphery, the Negev, and the Galilee, at the 30th Israeli government.

In 2007, when Peres was elected as the Ninth President of the State of Israel, Frish was appointed as President Peres' Chief Spokesperson.

In her term as President Peres' Chief Spokesperson, Frish led several public campaigns. One of them was an international campaign to launch the official Facebook page for Shimon Peres. For organizing the launch event, Frish received the annual award for the leading Israeli public relations campaign of 2012 ("The Roaring Lion Award") for the Facebook campaign.

Between 2008 and 2013 Frish led communications for the Israeli Presidential Conferences known as "Facing Tomorrow", under the auspices of President Peres. In 2013, the conference began with celebrations for President Peres' 90th birthday, with attendance by former US President Bill Clinton and a performance by Barbra Streisand.

In 2014 Frish also managed the communications of the "Invocation for Peace" event held at the Vatican, led by Pope Francis, President Peres and Palestinian President Mahmoud Abbas. Later that year, Frish initiated the establishment of an Innovation Center within the Peres Center for Peace, which now called Peres Center for Peace and Innovation.

Frish was one of the initiators of the Netflix documentary film "Never Stop Dreaming: The Life and Legacy of Shimon Peres."

After her role at the President's Office, Frish founded "Frish Strategic Consulting Ltd.," a strategic advisory firm. Among the firm's clients (past and present) is former Israeli Prime Minister and Head of the Yesh Atid Party Yair Lapid; Israel's 11th President, Isaac Herzog; Sylvan Adams, Israeli entrepreneur Erel Margalit; Lawyer Prof. Alan Dershowitz and more.

In 2020–2022 Frish was chosen by Maariv Newspaper as one of the 40 most influential women in Israel.

Frish often appears as a commentator and analyst on Israeli television on issues related to current affairs, Israeli politics, foreign policy and security.

== Personal life ==
Frish is married to Adi, Vice President at Redhill Biopharma. They have four children and live in the community of Aseret.
