= List of pensioners' parties =

The following is a list of political parties that promote the interests of pensioners.

== Argentina ==
- Pensioners' White Party (Partido Blanco de los Jubilados)

== Australia ==
- Seniors United Party of Australia (2015-2022)
- Pensioner and Citizen Initiated Referendum Alliance (1982-1999)
- Grey Power (Australia) (1983-1997)
- Pensioner Power Association of Australia, (1968-1972)

== Belgium ==
- Becoming older worthily (Waardig Ouder Worden) (active in 1993-2000), got 1 provincial councillor and several municipal and district councillors in Flanders in 1994. Most of its councillors defected to the far right Flemish Blok just before the next elections in 2000, two had defected earlier to the Flemish Liberal Party.
- Pensioners' Party (Parti des pensionnés), or Pensioners' and Retired People's Party (Parti des pensionnés et des retraités), had one list at the 2009 regional elections and one at the 2010 federal ones, and several lists at the 2012 provincial and municipal elections, only in Liège Province (Wallonia). Political scientists rank this party among the far right, its spokesman is an activist in the local Pegida branch.

== Bosnia ==
- Party of United Pensioners
- Pensioners' Party of Bosnia and Herzegovina
- Pensioners' Party of the Republika Srpska

== Brazil ==
- Retirees' National Party of Brazil (defunct, 1990)
- Party of the Nation's Retirees (defunct, 2006)

== Chile ==
- Pensioners' Party (Partido de los Jubilados)

== Croatia ==
- Croatian Party of Pensioners (Croatia)

== Czech Republic ==
- Pensioners for Life Security

== Denmark ==
- Active Pensionists (Denmark)

== France ==
- Enlarged Union of Seniors (dissolved)
- Rally of seniors and retirees (no longer active)

== Germany ==
- The Grays – Gray Panthers (Germany, no longer active)
- Pensioners and Retirees Party (Bündnis 21/RRP)

== Hungary ==
- Pensioners' Party (Hungary, no longer active)

== Israel ==
- Generations who Built the Land (Dor), originally Pensioners of Israel to the Knesset (Gil)
  - Justice for the Elderly (faction)

== Italy ==
- United Pensioners
- Pensioners' Party
- Pensioners' National Party (dissolved)

== Luxembourg ==
- Alternative Democratic Reform Party (Luxembourg)
- Party of the Third Age (Luxembourg, disbanded)

== Netherlands ==
- 50PLUS
- Party for the Future (dissolved)
- General Elderly Alliance (dissolved)
- Union 55+ (dissolved)

== Norway ==
- Pensioners Party (Norway)

== North Macedonia ==
- Party of Pensioners (North Macedonia)

== Philippines ==
In the Philippines, pensioners are referred to as "senior citizens", and parties for senior citizens usually run in partylist elections.

- Ang Tinig ng Seniors
- Senior Citizens Partylist
- United Senior Citizens

== Portugal ==
- United Party of Retirees and Pensioners
- National Solidarity Party (dissolved, 2006)

== Russia ==
- Russian Party of Pensioners for Justice

== Serbia ==
- Party of United Pensioners of Serbia (PUPS)

== Slovenia ==
- Pavel Rupar's Voice of Pensioners (2024– )
- Karl Erjavec - Trust Party (2024– )
- Party of Generations (2025– )
- Democratic Party of Pensioners of Slovenia (1991–2025)

== Sweden ==
- Swedish Senior Citizen Interest Party

== Ukraine ==
- Party of Pensioners of Ukraine
- Party of Protection of Pensioners of Ukraine
- Bloc of the Party of Pensioners of Ukraine (Ukraine)

== United Kingdom ==
- Pensioners Party (England) (defunct, 2013)
- Senior Citizens Party (defunct, 2014)
- Scottish Senior Citizens Unity Party (defunct, 2015)
