= The Right Way (political party) =

The Right Way הדרך הטובה
- Leader: Elhanan Glazer
- Founded: 2008
- Split from: Justice for the Elderly
- Merged into: Tzomet
- Ideology: Pensioners' interests
- Most MKs: 1 (2006)

The Right Way (Hebrew: הדרך הטובה, HaDerekh HaTova) was a Knesset faction in Israel. Its sole member was Elhanan Glazer.

== History ==
In June 2008 Glazer was one of three Knesset members to break away from Gil to form Justice for the Elderly. When the new faction merged back into Gil on 27 October 2008, Glazer did not rejoin Gil, but was granted permission by the House Committee to create a new faction, The Right Way.

The party did not run in the 2009 elections, as Glazer ran on the Tzomet list.
