= Justice for the Elderly =

Pensioner political party in Israel

Justice for the Elderly צדק לזקן
- Leader: Moshe Sharoni
- Founded: 2 June 2008
- Dissolved: 27 October 2008
- Split from: Gil
- Merged into: Gil
- Ideology: Pensioner interest
- Political position: Center
- Most MKs: 3 (2008)
- Fewest MKs: 3 (2008)

Justice for the Elderly (Hebrew: צדק לזקן, Tzedek LaZaken) was a political faction in Israel between June and October 2008. Led by Moshe Sharoni, it had three seats in the Knesset.

== History ==
The faction was established on 2 June 2008 when three MKs from Gil (Moshe Sharoni, Elhanan Glazer and Sarah Marom) left the party. Glazer had initially decided not to quit Gil after being promised a Deputy Ministerial post (a decision which Sharoni claimed he would sue Glazer for NIS 2 million for), but eventually changed his mind again and left the party.

The faction was initially planned to be associated with the Social Justice party, with three MKs promised places in the top five on the Social Justice list in the next elections and Sharoni a senior cabinet post, as well as funding amounting to tens of thousands of shekels a month. Gil MK Yitzhak Galanti stated that the "move could result in Hezbollah leader Hassan Nasrallah or Iranian President Mahmoud Ahmadinejad also 'buying' a Knesset faction to represent their views". However, the agreement was later cancelled.

On 15 October 2008 Sharoni announced that the faction was to merge back into Gil. The merger went ahead on 27 October, although Elhanan Glazer broke away to establish another new faction, The Right Way.
