= Active Pensionists =

Active Pensionists Aktive Pensionister
- Founded: 1997
- Ideology: Pensioners' interests

Active Pensionists (Danish: Aktive Pensionister) was a political party in Denmark.

== History ==
Active Pensionists was established in 1997. The party ran in 2001 in Copenhagen (507 votes), Frederikshavn (212 votes) and Skagen Municipality (19 votes). They did not get any municipal seats.

In 2005, Active Pensionists ran in Greve Municipality (43 votes), Vejle Municipality (158 votes), Fredericia Municipality (679) and Copenhagen Municipality (232 votes). They did not manage to get any municipal seats.

The party has not run for municipal elections since 2005, and is assumedly dissolved.

== Election results ==
=== Municipal elections ===
Date	Votes	Seats	
Date	Votes	#	±
2001	738	0 / 4,647	0
2005	1,112	0 / 2,522	0
2009-2013	Did not run.		
