= Moshe Sharoni =

Israeli politician (1929–2020)

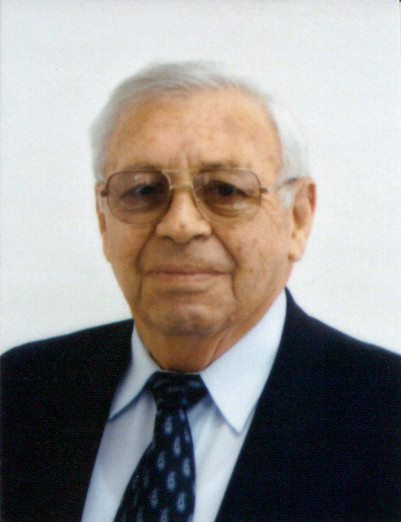
- Sharoni during his time in the Knesset

Faction represented in the Knesset
- 2006–2008: Gil
- 2008: Justice for the Elderly
- 2008–2009: Gil

Personal details
- Born: 1929; Buhuși, Romania
- Died: 20 September 2020

Moshe Sharoni (Hebrew: משה שרוני; 1929 – 20 September 2020) was an Israeli politician who served as a member of the Knesset for Gil and Justice for the Elderly between 2006 and 2009.

== Biography ==
Born in Buhuși in Romania in 1929, Sharoni emigrated to Israel in 1948. In 1987 he gained a BA in municipal management from the University of Haifa.

Prior to the 1996 elections he and Nava Arad helped establish the Pensioner's Party, which later became Gil. He was second on the party's list for the 1999 elections, but the party failed to win a seat. In 2006 he was elected to the Knesset on the Gil list. However, in early 2008 he led a breakaway faction from the party, establishing Justice for the Elderly on 2 June 2008.

On 27 October 2008 the faction merged back into Gil. He lost his seat in the 2009 elections when the party failed to cross the electoral threshold.
