= 2007 Israeli presidential election =

- 13 June 2007

120 members of the Knesset Simple majority of votes needed to win
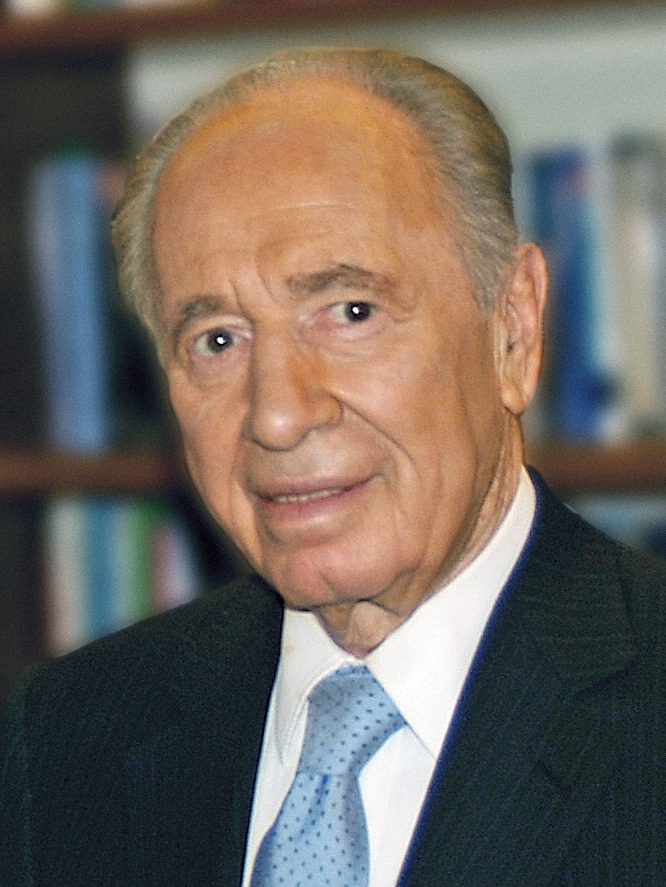

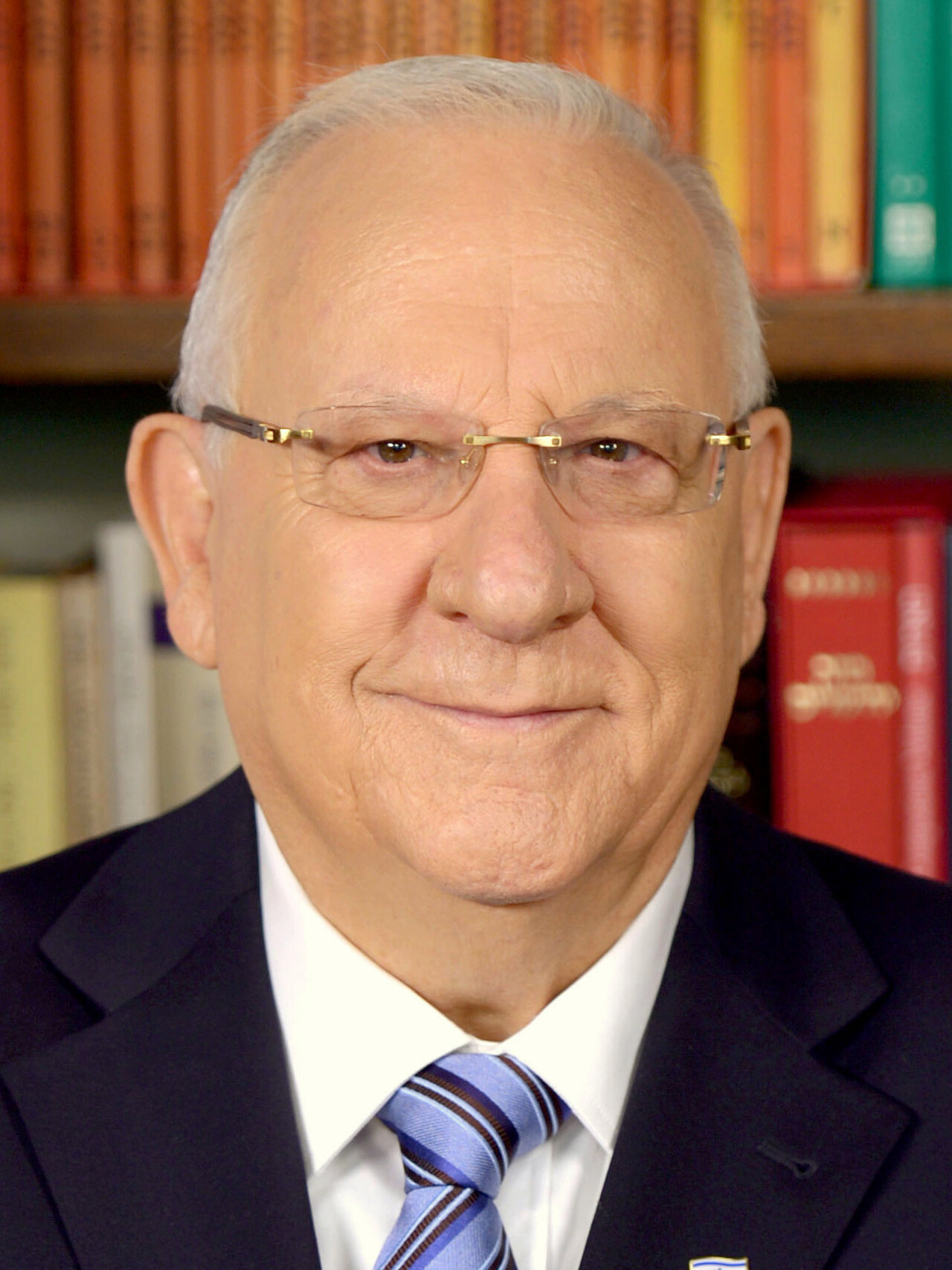

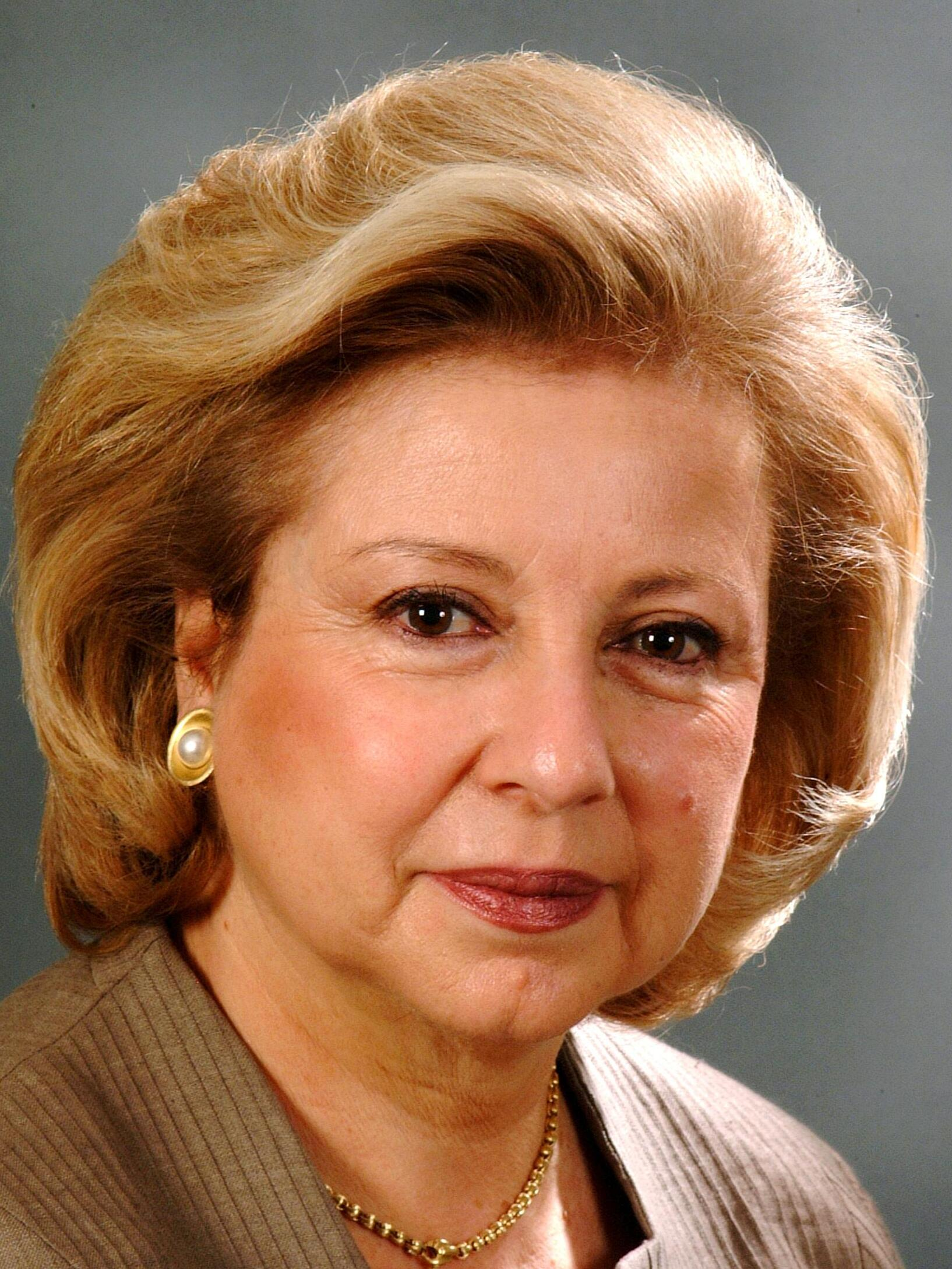
Nominee	Shimon Peres	Reuven Rivlin	Colette Avital
Party	Kadima	Likud	Labor
First round	58; 50.00%	37; 31.90%	21; 18.10%
Second round	86; 78.90%	withdrew	withdrew
President before election
Moshe Katsav
Likud
Elected President
Shimon Peres
Kadima

Indirect presidential elections were held in Israel on 13 June 2007. The Knesset elected Shimon Peres, a former Prime Minister and a member of the Kadima party. His opponents were Reuven Rivlin, a former Knesset speaker, of the Likud Party, and Colette Avital, of the Labor party. After the first round of voting put Peres in a commanding lead, but just short of the absolute majority required for election, Rivlin and Avital bowed out and Peres was elected easily in the second round.

== Candidates ==
The deadline for candidates to announce their intention to run was twenty days before the election, i.e. by 25 May.

Avital was the first Labor candidate to officially announce her intention to run. She gained the backing of former Prime Minister Ehud Barak, who at the time was running an ultimately successful campaign to regain the leadership of the Labor Party in that year's leadership contest. However, it appeared that most Labor MKs were likely to back ex-Laborite Shimon Peres, who was then serving as Vice Prime Minister.

Peres, however, was advised not to stand by his campaign adviser, in the belief that he would not win enough votes in a secret ballot, and that a defeat would be bad for his image. This came after the legislation for the "Peres Law", which would replace a secret ballot with an open one, was postponed until after the election by its creator, Kadima's Yoel Hasson. The bill was seen as a means of protecting Peres from another upset defeat, after his loss to then-little known Likud MK Moshe Katsav by a 63–57 vote in the 2000 presidential election. Nevertheless, Peres was named as Kadima's official candidate on 28 May, and won the support of Rabbi Ovadia Yosef, the influential spiritual leader of Shas.

Other persons who had been considered as possible candidates included Dalia Itzik (Kadima), Binyamin Ben-Eliezer (Labor), Rabbi Yisrael Meir Lau, and Meir Shamgar. Rabbi Lau had been warned not to run for the post by Labor MK and former journalist Shelly Yachimovich. Yachimovich stated that were Lau to run, "certain stories from the past may arise, including some that have never been publicized."

== Results ==
The election was expected to be a close race between Peres and Rivlin. However, the first-round results left Peres only three votes short of a majority, at which point his opponents conceded the race. Following his election, Peres promptly resigned as Vice Prime Minister, and began his seven-year term as President on 15 July 2007.

Candidate	Party	First round		Second round	
Candidate	Party	Votes	%	Votes	%
Shimon Peres	Kadima	58	50.00	86	78.90
Reuven Rivlin	Likud	37	31.90		
Colette Avital	Israeli Labor Party	21	18.10		
Against				23	21.10
Total		116	100.00	109	100.00
Valid votes		116	96.67	109	91.60
Invalid votes		1	0.83	2	1.68
Blank votes		3	2.50	8	6.72
Total votes		120	100.00	119	100.00
Registered voters/turnout		120	100.00	120	99.17
Source: Knesset

== See also ==
- Wikinews:Shimon Peres discusses the future of Israel
- Presidency of Shimon Peres
