= Israeli Presidential Conference =

Conference held in Jerusalem, Israel

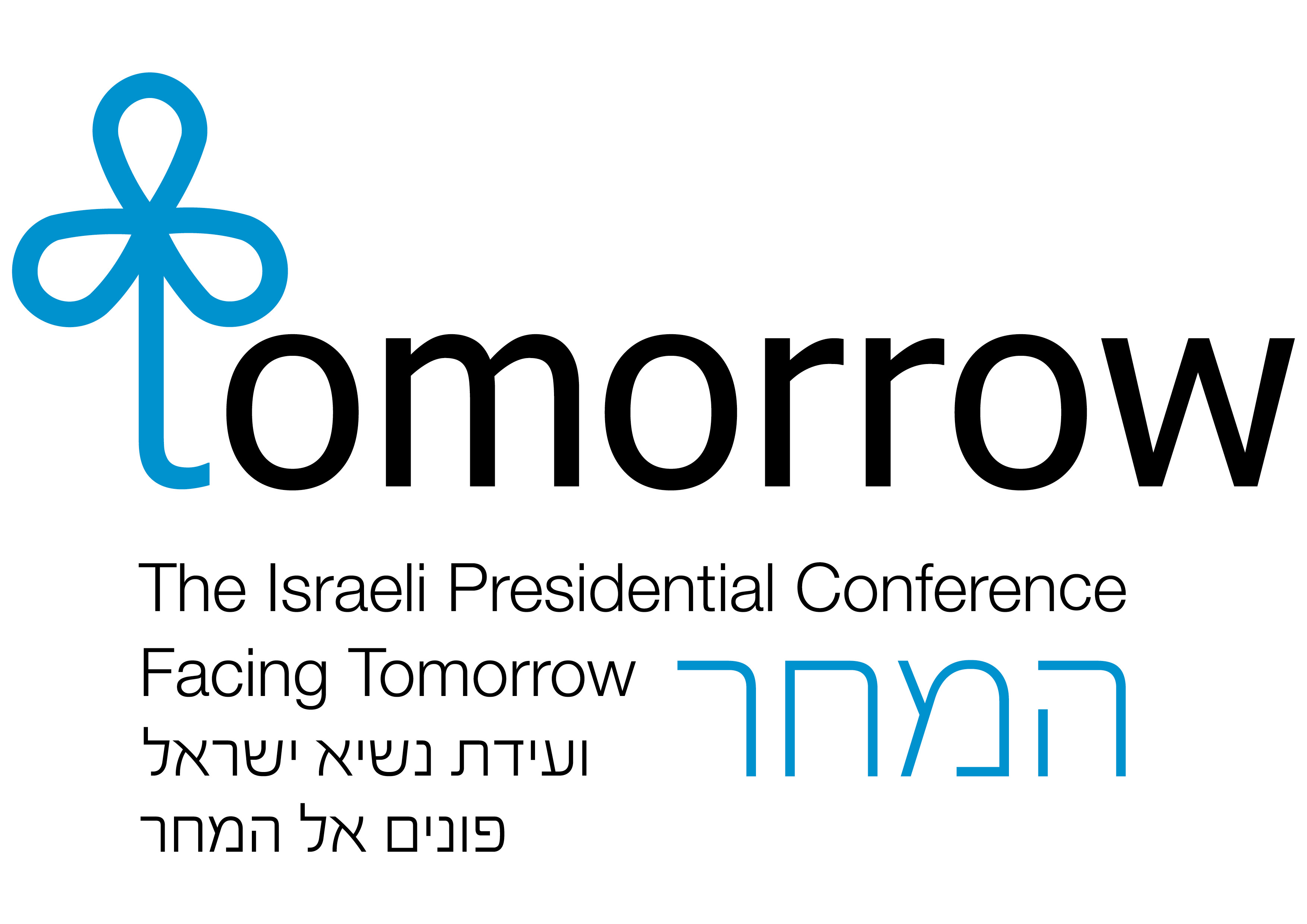
- Genre: conference
- Frequency: annually
- Location: Jerusalem
- Country: Israel
- Years active: 2008–present
- Founder: Shimon Peres

The Israeli Presidential Conference is a high level conference held in Jerusalem, once every 18 months originally, and more recently annually, under the auspices of the Israeli President and Nobel Prize laureate, Shimon Peres. The gathering, titled "Facing Tomorrow", brings together the world top leaders and thinkers in a wide variety of fields including policy, energy, science, economics, culture, art, religion, and thought, to navigate the most pressing global challenges ahead.

== History ==
The Conference was inaugurated in May 2008 by Israel's ninth President, Shimon Peres. The conference seeks to investigate the crises and solutions, trends and innovations, visions and ideals that are shaping our collective future. The aim of the Conference was the development of an annual event that not only "talks" but also drives action and encourages practical initiatives.

Previous conferences had as speakers a variety of global leaders, international scholars and activists, poets and scientists, artists and clergy, entrepreneurs, economists and industrialists, including George W. Bush, Elie Wiesel, Robert De Niro, Rupert Murdoch, and Bernard-Henri Lévy.

Dates	Location	Theme	URL
18 – 20 June 2013	Jerusalem	The Human Factor	2013
19 – 21 June 2012	Jerusalem		2012
21 – 23 June 2011	Jerusalem	A thriving tomorrow or a declining tomorrow?	2011
20 – 22 October 2009	Jerusalem	Our Mutual Tomorrow	2009
13 – 15 May 2008	Jerusalem		2008

== Structure ==
Each Conference consists of plenary sessions, panel discussions, roundtables, master classes and an exhibition.

The 2008 Conference Steering Committee partnered with The Jewish Policy Planning Institute to develop and produce the Conference. The 2009, 2011, 2012 and 2013 Steering Committees partnered with The Hebrew University of Jerusalem to develop and produce the Conference.

== 2013 Boycott Campaign ==
On 7 May 2013, physicist Stephen Hawking informed the organizers that he was cancelling his participation as keynote speaker. He indicated that this was in support of the academic boycott protesting Israel's treatment of Palestinians. It was later found that among the 20 academics who lobbied Hawking to boycott were Noam Chomsky and Malcolm Levitt who advocated boycott as the proper method for scientist to respond to the "explicit policy" of "systemic discrimination" against the non-Jewish and Palestinian population. Hawkings decision was heavily criticized by several academics, including former Harvard University president Larry Summers and David Newman, who warned that "an academic boycott just destroys one of the very few spaces left where Israelis and Palestinians actually do come together."

== See also ==
- Presidency of Shimon Peres
