= Ya'akov Ben-Yezri =

Moroccan–Israeli politician

- יעקב בן-יזרי
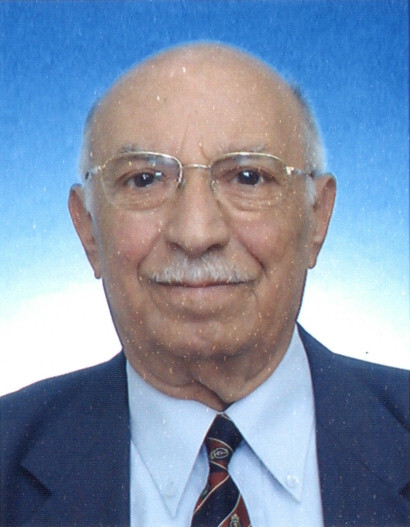

Ministerial roles
- 2006–2009: Minister of Health

Faction represented in the Knesset
- 2006–2009: Gil

Personal details
- Born: 1 October 1927 Fes, Morocco
- Died: 17 February 2018 (aged 90) Kfar Saba, Israel

Ya'akov Ben-Yezri (Hebrew: יעקב בן-יזרי; 1 October 1927 – 17 February 2018) was a Moroccan–Israeli politician. He served as a Knesset member on behalf of Gil and as the country's Minister of Health between 2006 and 2009.

== Biography ==
Ben-Yezri was born on 1 October 1927 in Fes in Morocco. He was made aliyah to Israel on 30 November 1949. In 1955, he was elected to Pardes Hana local council, serving until 1963. In 1958, he became a clerk at Clalit health services, a job he worked in until 1993. He also served as a regional director for the company between 1974 and 1993. He is also a former national chairman of the Health Funds' Workers Organization and chairman of the Health Funds' Pensioners Organization.

He was voted into the 17th Knesset in the 2006 elections, and was subsequently appointed Minister of Health in Ehud Olmert's government. Ben-Yezri, a confessed smoker, later caused controversy when he lit up whilst being interviewed on television.

He was placed fourth on the Gil list for the 2009 elections, but the party failed to cross the electoral threshold, and he lost his seat.
