= Goldfarb Gross Seligman =

Israeli law firm

- Type: Partnership (Israel)
- Industry: Law
- Founded: Tel Aviv, Israel (1930)
- Headquarters: Tel Aviv, Israel
- Key people: Adv. Yudi Levy, Co-Chairman, Managing Partner
- Products: Legal advice
- Revenue: Unknown
- Number of employees: Approximately 520
- Website: www.goldfarb.com

Goldfarb Gross Seligman is an Israeli law firm headquartered in Tel Aviv. The firm was formed in 2011 through the merger of Goldfarb, Levy, Eran, Meiri & Co. and M. Seligman & Co., and was further expanded in 2023 through a merger with Gross & Co., creating what was reported as the country’s largest law firm, with more than 500 lawyers.

The firm is headed by Adv. Yudi Levy, co-chairman, managing partner, and the chairman of its executive committee.

Goldfarb Gross Seligman employs over 520 attorneys, including over 100 partners, who offer clients a wide spectrum of legal services. The firm focuses on four core practice areas: corporate and capital markets in Israel and overseas; litigation of all types; real estate, planning and construction of all descriptions; and taxation in Israel and internationally. The firm also offers highly specialized practices in industry; labor law; antitrust and competition; infrastructure; regulation; intellectual property and privacy; energy; finance; banking; insurance; environmental law; and more.
