= Nava Arad =

Israeli politician (1938–2022)

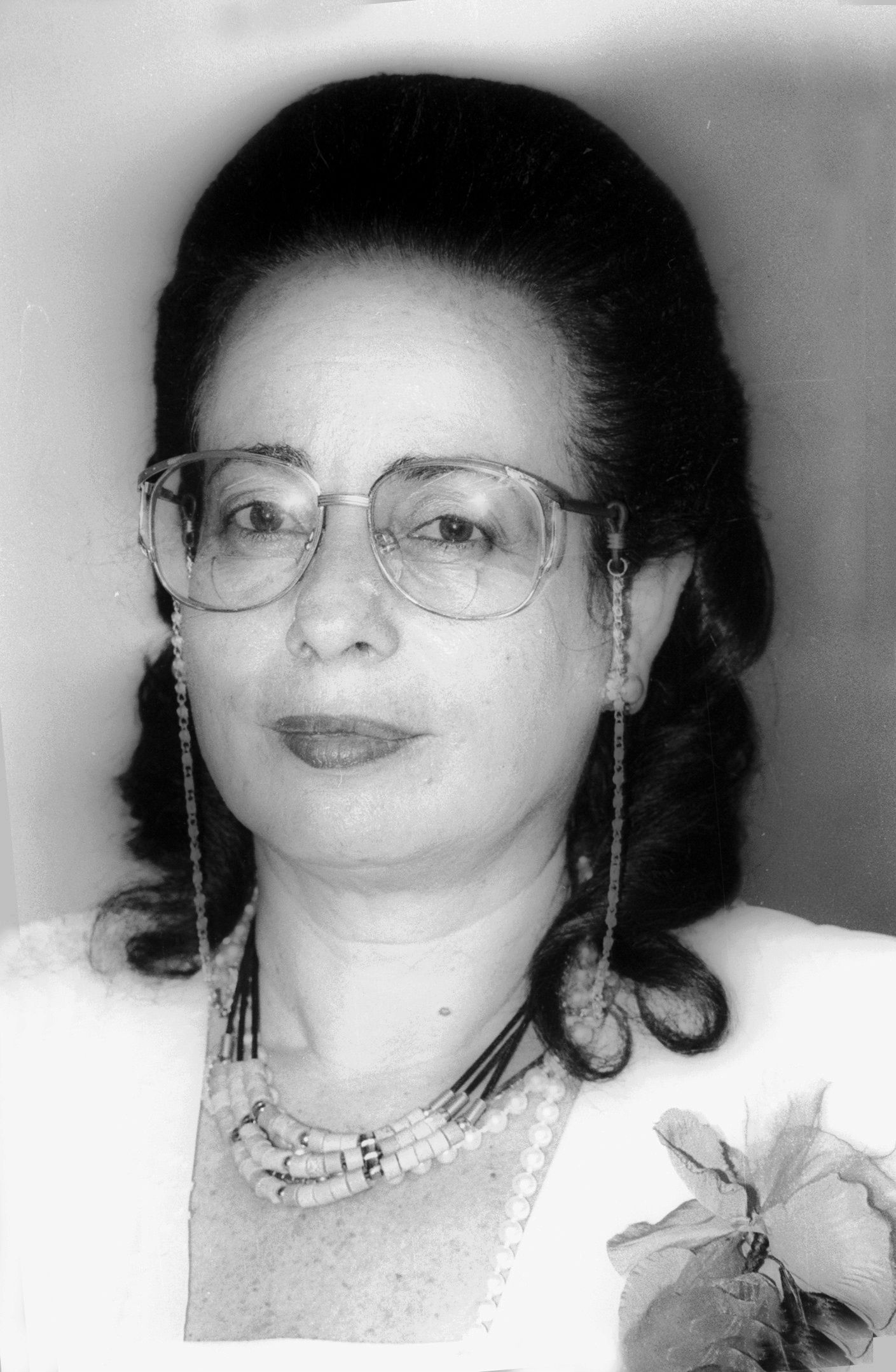
- Arad in 1990

Faction represented in the Knesset
- 1981–1991: Alignment
- 1991–1992: Labor Party
- 1995–1996: Labor Party
- 1996: Independent

Personal details
- Born: 4 December 1938 Hulda, Mandatory Palestine
- Died: 21 February 2022 (aged 83)

Nava Arad (Hebrew: נאוה ארד; 4 December 1938 – 21 February 2022) was an Israeli politician who served as a member of the Knesset between 1981 and 1992, and again from 1995 until 1996.

== Life and career ==
Born in kibbutz Hulda in Mandatory Palestine, Arad served as a welfare sergeant in Nahal brigade during her national service in the IDF. She gained a BA from the Beit Berl Teachers College, another bachelor's degree in social work from the Hebrew University of Jerusalem, and an MA in social administration and social policy from the University of London.

She worked as a teacher and social worker, and became national secretary of the Social Workers Union. She chaired the Committee for Income Maintenance in the Prime Minister's Advisory Council on Society and Welfare during Yitzhak Rabin's second spell as Prime Minister, as well as the Workers' Faction in the Bituah Leumi council. She was also a member of the Histadrut central committee, secretary general of Na'amat, and vice-president and Middle East representative of Socialist International Women.

In 1981 she was elected to the Knesset on the Alignment list. She was re-elected in 1984 and 1988, but lost her seat in the 1992 elections. She returned to the Knesset on 5 November 1995 as a replacement for the assassinated Rabin, but on 7 March the following year left the Labor Party to sit as an independent.

For the May 1996 elections she founded the Gil list, a pensioner's party, but it failed to cross the electoral threshold, and she lost her seat. She also headed the party in the 1999 elections, but it again failed to win a seat.

Arad died on 21 February 2022, at the age of 83.
