= Retirees' National Party of Brazil =

Retirees' National Party of Brazil Partido Nacional dos Aposentados do Brasil
- Abbreviation: PNAB
- Founder: Joaquim Bias dos Santos
- Founded: July 14, 1988
- Dissolved: September 11, 1990
- Split from: Retirees' National Party (PNA)
- TSE electoral number: 47

The Retirees' National Party of Brazil (Portuguese: Partido Nacional dos Aposentados do Brasil, PNAB) was a Brazilian political party founded in 1988.

== History ==
The party was founded on July 14, 1988, when it received a provisional registration by the Superior Electoral Court (TSE).

In the 1988 municipal elections of São Paulo, it launched the candidacy of José Galico, who received 3,723 votes, coming 12th of 14 mayoral candidates. In Rio de Janeiro, it joined the Progressive Unity coalition (PCN, PNAB, PS, PTN), which supported Marcello Alencar's victorious campaign.

On September 11, 1990, the party was legally disbanded, having lost its provisional registration while contesting the elections. It continued to participate unregistered, however, and elected Ivan Albuquerque state deputy for Rio de Janeiro. At Artur Guedes' (PDS) request, the TSE annulled all votes to PNAB and removed Ivan from office.
