= Yehoshua Pollack =

Israeli politician

- יהושע פולק
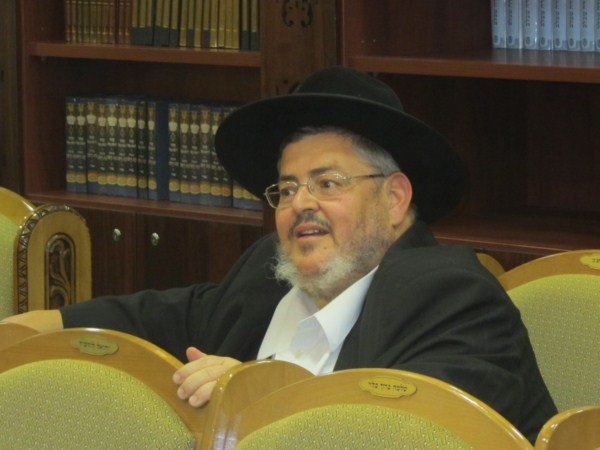
- Pollack in 2011

Faction represented in the Knesset
- 2009: Agudat Yisrael

Personal details
- Born: 12 February 1948 (age 77)

Yehoshua Menachem Pollack (Hebrew: יהושע מנחם פולק; born 12 February 1948) is an Israeli politician and a former member of the Knesset for Agudat Yisrael.

== Biography ==
A former deputy mayor of Jerusalem, Pollack was placed eighth on the United Torah Judaism list for the 2006 Knesset elections. Although he missed out on a seat when the party won only five mandates, he entered the Knesset on 26 January 2009 as a replacement for the deceased Avraham Ravitz. However, he lost his seat in the February 2009 elections.
