= David Rotem =

Israeli politician

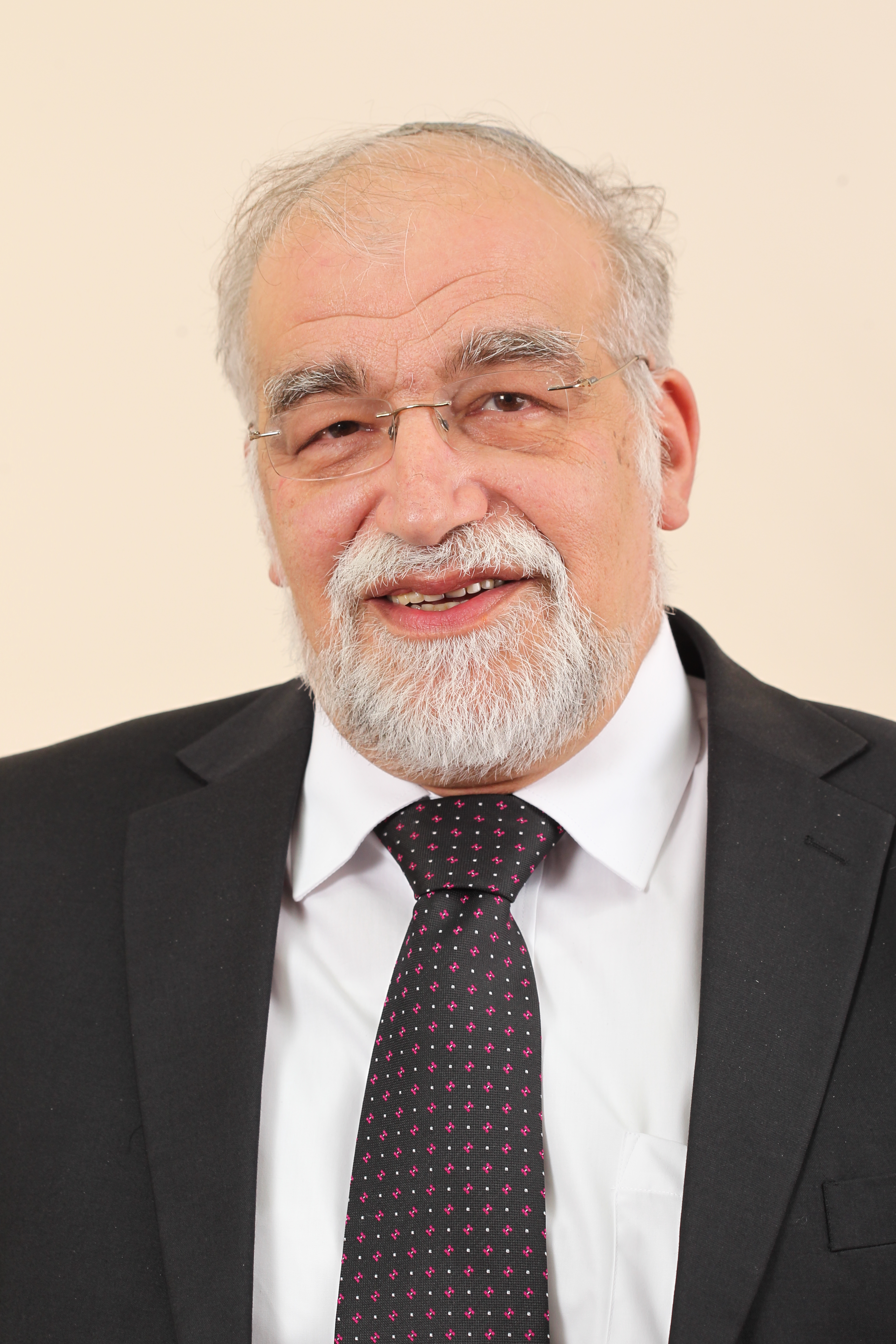
- Rotem in 2013

Faction represented in the Knesset
- 2007–2015: Yisrael Beiteinu

Personal details
- Born: 11 January 1949 Bnei Brak, Israel
- Died: 8 June 2015 (aged 66) Efrat, West Bank

David Rotem (Hebrew: דוד רותם; 11 January 1949 – 8 June 2015) was an Israeli politician. He served as a member of the Knesset for Yisrael Beiteinu between 2007 and 2015.

== Biography ==
Rotem was born in Bnei Brak and grew up in Jerusalem. He attended Horev, a religious elementary school and the Horev Yeshiva High School. From 1966 to 1967 he studied at Bell Lane, a Jewish school in London. Between 1967 and 1971 he studied law at the Hebrew University of Jerusalem, gaining an LLB.

In 1972 he became an assistant at the Faculty of Law at Bar-Ilan University, a position he held until 1977. Between 1978 and 1980 he worked as a lecturer on legislative law at the same institution. He has also served as a member of the executive committee of Sha'arei Tzedek Medical Center, and deputy chairman of the Central Elections Committee.

He spoke Yiddish and English, and was nicknamed Dudu. He served on the boards of several not-for-profit organizations.

=== Political career ===
Formerly a member of the National Religious Party, he was placed twelfth on the Yisrael Beiteinu list for the 2006 Knesset elections. Although the party won only eleven seats, Rotem entered the Knesset on 16 January 2007 as a replacement for the deceased Yuri Stern. He retained his seat in the 2009 elections, for which he was placed eighth on the party's list. He was re-elected for a third term in the 2013 elections on the joint Likud–Yisrael Beiteinu list.

Known for his "typical bluntness" and for serving as chairman of the Knesset Constitution, Law and Justice Committee, Rotem worked on issues of religion and state. An Orthodox Jew, he conducted negotiations regarding the conversion and civil partnership bills, two laws his party promised to pass, mainly to benefit immigrants from the former Soviet Union. The conversion bill was criticized by both Orthodox and Reform constituents, while the civil partnership bill was criticized by those favoring civil marriage in Israel. The civil union law, while limited, was passed and survived review by the High Court. It applies only to unions in which both Israelis are listed as "without religion," but Rotem described it as a first step toward civil marriage. Civil marriage advocates, who note that this law affects approximately 30,000 Israelis, view it as a positive development that they hope will lead to "more far-reaching legislation."

In 2010 Rotem's committee unanimously approved a bill allowing Israeli absorption committees of small communities to reject applicants who did not meet certain criteria, such as "suitability to the community's fundamental outlook." Critics described the legislation as racist and discriminatory, arguing that it would allow communities to deny residence to applicants based on their gender, religion, or socioeconomic status. As committee chair, Rotem commented on criticism that the bill's intent was to deny equal residential access to Arabs: "In my opinion, every Jewish town needs at least one Arab. What would happen if my refrigerator stopped working on a Saturday?" A petition to overturn the law was filed, but the law was upheld by a 5–4 vote of the High Court of Justice.

Rotem was involved in conversion legislation in 2010 that created difficulties with the Jewish diaspora. Jonathan Sarna, professor of American Jewish history at Brandeis University, noted that Rotem said he intended to solve the problem of conversions, but in a move that the diaspora thought was "sleight-of-hand," Rotem inserted an amendment making conversion subject to the Israeli chief Rabbinate, an institution viewed as hostile to the Jewish diaspora. Sarna recalled that Rotem insisted he was misunderstood and was sorry. Richard Jacobs (rabbi), president of the Union for Reform Judaism, said Rotem's bill was stopped because "Jewish federations and denominations leaned heavily on Prime Minister Netanyahu." Jacobs commented that the diaspora considers some of Rotem's perspectives problematic because of the high-impact legislation Rotem's committee works on, such as issues of Jewish identity and pluralism. To avert what The New York Times called a "crisis" in the relationship between Israel and the diaspora, Prime Minister Benjamin Netanyahu declared he would delay this legislation, which "could tear apart the Jewish people." Rotem said criticism was based on misinterpretation of the legislation by Reform and Conservative leaders: "They need to check the facts before they speak. They are acting like absolute idiots."

In June 2013 Rotem was in line to become a member of the Judicial Nominations Committee. However, in a last-minute upset, he was defeated by a candidate from the opposition.

In political matters regarding religion, Rotem continued to generate controversy. In 2013, he said in an interview that Reform rabbis were not rabbis, and in 2014, while head of the Knesset Constitution, Law and Justice Committee, Rotem was heard referring to the Jewish Reform movement as "another religion" and "not Jewish." The director of the Anti-Defamation League, Abe Foxman, labelled Rotem's comments "inappropriate, offensive and unjustified," and demanded a quick and unequivocal apology to Reform Jews. When publication of the remark created an uproar, Rotem wrote to a critic: "Indeed, this comment was a mistake, and I intend to rectify it at the upcoming meeting of the committee on Sunday." The executive director of the Reform Movement in Israel, Gilad Kariv, explained to Rotem why the term "another religion" was so disturbing to non-Orthodox Jews. "Beyond the obvious reasons, this is a legal term that appears in the Law of Return, where it says that a Jew who practices 'another religion' is not eligible for aliyah, and that is very significant," said Kariv. On the other hand, fellow Knesset member Uri Maklev defended Rotem against Reform Jewish criticism, saying, "The Reform movement persecutes the Jewish people and attempts to crush it from within. ... They are the biggest enemy of the Jewish people and they cause assimilation. [The Reform movement's] tentacles are everywhere. They bribe politicians and the press. They have created an unprecedented pressure group."

In February 2014, a meeting between U.S. Ambassador Dan Shapiro and Knesset "Land of Israel" caucus members, which was supposed to be closed and off the record, was secretly recorded and leaked to the press. Rotem was quoted in the meeting as challenging the American ambassador: "How can we trust you? When have you stood by us in the past?" While then MK Reuven Rivlin joined Rotem in criticizing the American approach, others, such as MK Hilik Bar, lamented the Knesset members' attacks on "the ambassador of our closest friend."

In August 2014 Rotem joined several other right-wing MKs in sponsoring a bill that would make Hebrew the only official language of Israel. Current law, which dates back to the British Mandate, requires that both Arabic and Hebrew be used in a wide variety of government functions, including the legal system and government ministries.

On 6 January 2015 Rotem announced that he planned to leave politics and would not contest the 2015 elections. He died at home from cardiac arrest on 8 June 2015.

== Views ==
=== Settlements in the West Bank ===
Participating in a 2007 demonstration march on the then-Prime Minister Ehud Olmert's residence, Rotem said, "We're telling the Israeli government to not raise its hand to divide Jerusalem or to raise its hand against the settlements in Judea and Samaria." He continued: "We did not build these settlements in vain. And we will not allow the Israeli government, the minister of defense or the prime minister to freeze construction." In 2014 he delayed legislation that would require transparency in settlement funding, noting he did not want to provide opponents with information that could be used to "bring a Supreme Court lawsuit and prevent construction in Judea and Samaria."

=== Haredi conscription ===
Rotem believed all Israelis should be drafted for national service, including Haredim and Arabs. In a panel discussion on the Knesset television station, he stated, "It is preferable to have goyim that fight on behalf of the state and are willing to die than to have parasites that remain unwilling to contribute to the state.

=== National anthem ===
When Christian Arab Supreme Court judge Justice Salim Joubran did not join in singing "Hatikvah," the national anthem with explicit references to Judaism, Rotem called for the judge's removal. While most Jewish Israelis found the justice's behavior appropriate as he stood respectfully but refrained from singing, Rotem declared that anyone who objects to the Zionist anthem "can find a state with a more appropriate anthem and move there."

=== Non-Orthodox Judaism ===
In an interview with the Jerusalem Post, Rotem commented on his views regarding Reform and Conservative Judaism in Israel. "We will not recognize non-Orthodox rabbis, conversions or marriage," Rotem said. "I don't need Conservative and Reform communities in this country. In this country you can be Jewish, religious or not religious, and I don't want to change this. I don't want a Reform rabbi to check my dishes," he added.

== Personal life ==
At the time of his death, Rotem lived in the Israeli settlement of Efrat, and was married with five children.
