= Mazor Bahaina =

Israeli politician

- מזור בהיינה

Faction represented in the Knesset
- 2008–2009: Shas

Personal details
- Born: 12 September 1973 (age 52) Wolqayt, Ethiopia

Mazor Mahoy Bahaina (Hebrew: מזור בהיינה; born 12 September 1973) is an Israeli kes, Orthodox rabbi, and former politician, who served as a member of the Knesset for Shas between 2008 and 2009.

== Biography ==
Born in Wolqayt in Ethiopia, Bahaina's aliyah to Israel started with a trek on foot with his family across the Sudanese border, after which they waited for about a year and a half for immigration approval. On arriving in Israel, his family moved to Or Akiva, and later to Kiryat Gat. Bahaina studied in a few yeshivas, and became an ordained rabbi. After moving to Beersheba, he has worked in several socially-oriented positions to support immigrants from Ethiopia, eventually becoming the head rabbi of the Ethiopian Jewish community in Beersheba, numbering about 10,000, and a member of the local city council.

He was placed thirteenth on the Shas list for the 2006 Knesset elections. Although the party won only 12 seats, he entered the Knesset in April 2008, after Shlomo Benizri was convicted. For the 2009 elections, Bahaina was placed twelfth on the party's list, but lost his seat when Shas was reduced to eleven seats.

Bahaina lives in Beersheba. He is married, with eight children.
