= Elhanan Glazer =

Israeli politician

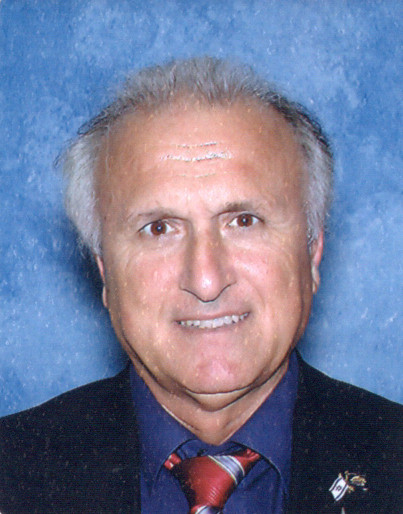

Faction represented in the Knesset
- 2006–2008: Gil
- 2008: Justice for the Elderly
- 2008–2009: The Right Way

Personal details
- Born: 13 August 1947 (age 77); Rehovot, Mandatory Palestine

Elhanan Glazer (Hebrew: אלחנן גלזר; born 13 August 1947) is an Israeli politician. He served as a member of the Knesset for Gil, Justice for the Elderly and The Right Way between 2006 and 2009.

== Biography ==
Born in Rehovot during the Mandate era, Glazer today lives in Rishon LeZion, and is widowed with three children.

For the 2006 Knesset elections he was placed sixth on the Gil list, and became a Knesset member when the party won seven seats. On 2 June 2008 he was one of three MKs to leave Gil and form the Justice for the Elderly faction.

Although Justice for the Elderly merged back into Gil on 27 October 2008, Glazer did not rejoin the party, and instead formed his own faction, The Right Way.

For the 2009 elections Glazer joined Tzomet and was placed second on the party's list. However, it failed to cross the electoral threshold, and Glazer lost his seat.
