= Said Nafa =

Israeli Druze politician (born 1953)

- سعيد نفاع
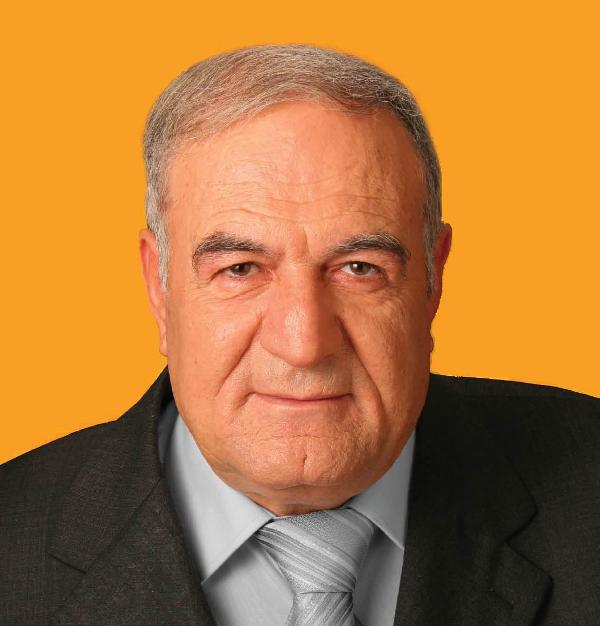

Faction represented in the Knesset
- 2007–2013: Balad

Personal details
- Born: 1 April 1953 (age 73) Beit Jann, Israel
- Party: Maki (1967 - 1999) Balad

Said Nafa (Arabic: سعيد نفاع; Hebrew: סעיד נפאע, also Said Naffaa, born 1 April 1953) is an Israeli Arab politician and lawyer. A Druze citizen of Israel, he served as a member of the Knesset for Balad between 2007 and 2013.

== Biography ==
Born into a family of the Druze faith in Beit Jann in 1953, Nafa joined the Communist Party of Israel (Maki) at age 14. He studied law at Tel Aviv University, graduating in 1983. In 1989, he was elected to his hometown's local council as a representative of Maki, and also served as mayor and deputy mayor in the 1990s.

Nafa left Maki in 1997, and joined Balad in 1999, along with a large group consisting of other members of the Druze community in Israel.

In 2001, he announced the "Pact of Free Druze", an initiative aimed at ending the conscription of Druze into the Israeli army and promoting the community's identity as an integral part of the Palestinian Arab population in Israel and the Palestinian people at large. Nafa himself is a conscientious objector who was jailed several times for refusing to carry out his army service and four of his sons have also stood trial for refusing to enlist.

Another committee founded by Nafa in 2003 seeks to facilitate contacts between Druze leaders in Israel and elsewhere in the Arab world, principally Syria and Lebanon.

Prior to the 2006 elections Nafa was placed fourth on the Balad list. Although Balad won only three seats in the election, he entered the Knesset on 24 April 2007 as a replacement for party leader Azmi Bishara, who had resigned. He was placed second on the party's list for the 2009 elections, and retained his seat as the party won three mandates.

In the end of February 2012, Nafa was a guest of honor in a rally supporting Bashar al-Assad and his government in Syria. He stated that he came to support the administration and to condemn the foreign coalition that was formed to prevent Assad's reform attempts. He also said that the western coalition made up the genocide and is responsible for the death of Syrian children, by supplying weapons to the gangs. According to Israeli prosecutors, Nafa also met with Talal Naji, the Secretary-General of the PFLP-GC while in Syria.

In December 2011, Nafa was indicted for illegally entering an enemy state and contacting a foreign agent.

Nafa did not contest the 2013 elections and subsequently lost his Knesset seat.

On April 6, 2014, Nafa was convicted of illegally entering an enemy state and on one count of contact with a foreign agent. He was acquitted of a second count of contacting a foreign agent. On September 4, 2014, he was sentenced to one year in prison.

Nafa lives in Beit Jann and is married with nine children.

== See also ==
- List of Arab members of the Knesset
