= Sarah Marom-Shalev =

Israeli politician

- שרה מרום שלו
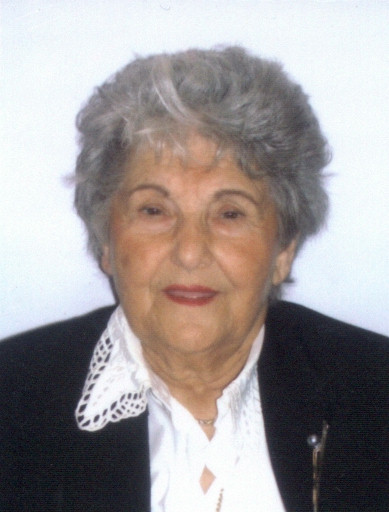
- Marom-Shalev in the 2000s

Faction represented in the Knesset
- 2006–2008: Gil
- 2008: Justice for the Elderly
- 2008–2009: Gil

Personal details
- Born: 23 September 1934 (age 90); Dorohoi, Romania

Sarah Marom-Shalev (Hebrew: שרה מרום שלו; born 23 September 1934) is an Israeli politician who served as a member of the Knesset for Gil between 2006 and 2009.

== Biography ==
Born in Dorohoi in Romania, Marom-Shalev emigrated to Israel in 1948.

For the 2006 Knesset elections she was placed seventh on the Gil list, and became a Knesset member when the party won seven seats. In June 2008 she was one of three MKs to leave Gil and form the Justice for the Elderly faction. On 27 October 2008 the faction merged back into Gil.

She lost her seat in the 2009 elections when the party failed to cross the electoral threshold.

Marom-Shalev lives in Rehovot and is divorced with two children
