= Shlomo Benizri =

Israeli politician (born 1961)

- שלמה בניזרי
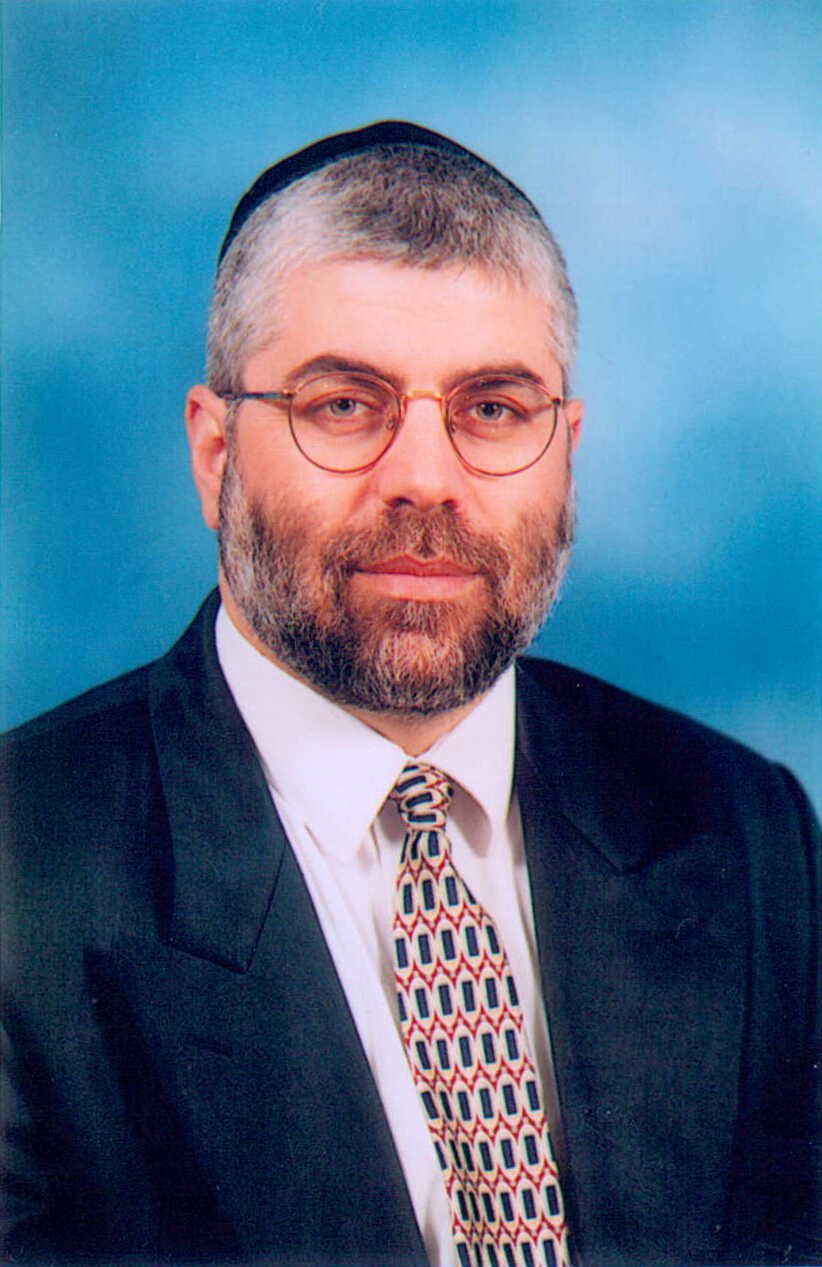
- Shlomo Benizri

Ministerial roles
- 1999–2000: Minister of Health
- 2001–2002: Minister of Labor & Social Welfare
- 2002–2003: Minister of Labor & Social Welfare

Faction represented in the Knesset
- 1992–2008: Shas

Personal details
- Born: 7 February 1961 (age 65) Nesher, Israel

Shlomo Benizri (Hebrew: שלמה בניזרי; born 7 February 1961) is an Israeli politician and member of the Shas party. He represented Shas in the Knesset between 1992 and 2008, serving as Deputy Health Minister, Minister of Health, and Labor and Social Welfare Minister during the late 1990s and early 2000s. He was later convicted for accepting bribes, breach of trust, conspiring to commit a crime, and obstruction of justice, and served a prison sentence.

== Biography ==
Shlomo Benizri was born in Nesher. He was one of eight children born to Maimon and Aliza Benizri. Growing up, he studied at elementary school in Nesher, a religious youth village in Kfar Hasidim, and the Nesher Comprehensive High School. He did military service in the Israel Defense Forces and participated in the 1982 Lebanon War. He then studied for ten years at Yeshivat Or HaChaim, a yeshiva in Jerusalem, and was ordained as a rabbi. He went on to teach at the yeshiva and serve as its spiritual director.

Benizri lives in Jerusalem and is married with eight children.

== Political career ==
Benizri was first elected to the Knesset in 1992 on Shas' list, and served as the party's parliamentary group chairman during his first term. He was re-elected in 1996, and was appointed Deputy Minister of Health in Binyamin Netanyahu's government. He was re-elected again in 1999 after being placed fifth on the Shas list, and was appointed Minister of Health in Ehud Barak's government, serving in the cabinet until Shas left the government on 11 July 2000.

He returned to the cabinet after Ariel Sharon formed a new government in 2001 as Labor and Social Welfare Minister, serving until the 2003 elections (aside from a period of two weeks in May–June 2002 when Shas withdrew from the coalition).

For the 2003 elections, Benizri was placed second on the Shas list, and was re-elected. For the 2006 elections, he was dropped to sixth place.

Although he retained his seat, on 29 March 2006, the day following the elections, he was charged by the State Prosecutor's Office with accepting bribes and breaching the public trust. The decision to indict Benizri after the elections was a conscious decision on the part of the Israeli attorney general Menachem Mazuz. On 1 April 2008, Benizri was convicted of accepting bribes, breach of faith, obstructing justice, and conspiracy to commit a crime for accepting favors worth millions of shekels from his friend, contractor Moshe Sela, in exchange for inside information regarding foreign workers scheduled to arrive in Israel. On 27 April 2008, a district court sentenced him to 18 months in jail and decided that his actions qualified as moral turpitude.

== Conviction and prison term ==
Benizi resigned from the Knesset the same day and was replaced by Mazor Bahaina. Both Benizri and the state appealed. On 24 June 2009, the Supreme Court upheld the decision and prolonged Benizri's jail time to 4 years. Shas MK Nissim Ze'ev declared after the sentencing: “He is a victim of the system that allows his fate to be decided by elitist judges, who care about his sector and his race and not the good deeds he performs. I have no doubt that an American jury would have treated him better. That's why we need a jury of our peers”. Benizri's brother, Rabbi David Benizri claimed that “a conspiracy of top-ranking homosexuals was behind the Supreme Court's decision to aggravate the sentence”. Benizri began serving his sentence on September 1, 2009, in the religious division of Maasiyahu prison in Ramle. His cellmate from December 7, 2011, to his release was former president Moshe Katsav.

In January 2012, a parole board reduced his sentence by 16 months due to good behavior. On March 1, 2012, Benizri was released early; he was one of 600 other prisoners whose sentences were commuted to ease overcrowding in Israeli prisons. As soon as he was released, he resumed delivering his shiurim.

== Views and opinions ==
In 1998, Benizri called for Dana International to be disqualified from the Eurovision Song Contest, which she went on to win. He stated, "The Eurovision Song Contest interests me about as much as the weather in Antarctica, but as a son of the Jewish people, it [Dana International's transsexuality] offends me", and "Undergoing a sex change is worse than an act of sodomy ... choosing her is sending a message of darkness to the world."

In 2001, he was accused of racism after he said, "I just don't understand why a restaurant needs a slant-eye to serve me my meal."

In 2004, during "The Passion of the Christ" controversy, when several Shas members wanted to have the film banned in Israel for antisemitism, Benizri disagreed, and said that, "the Jews did kill Jesus", reportedly elaborating that Jesus was put to death according to Sanhedrin tradition: "They [the Jews] took him [Jesus] up to a high roof, and threw him crashing to the ground. Afterwards, they hung his body on wooden beams in the shape of a 'T', but not, as the Christian legends say, that he was crucified. That's nonsense." Benizri also claims that Jesus' death was an internal Jewish affair. "What is there to deny? We're talking about a yeshiva student who left Judaism, and the Sanhedrin put him to death."

In 2008, Benizri blamed several earthquakes in the region on Israel's tolerance of homosexuality.

== See also ==
- Politics in Israel
- List of Israeli public officials convicted of crimes
