= Yitzhak Galanti =

Israeli politician

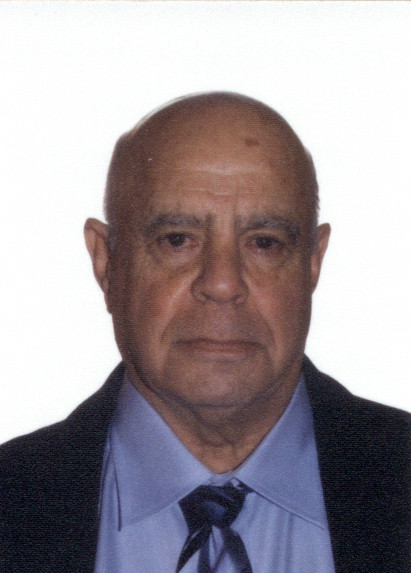
- Galanti during his time in the Knesset

Faction represented in the Knesset
- 2006–2009: Gil

Personal details
- Born: 12 February 1937 Damascus, Syria
- Died: 25 June 2012 (aged 75)

Yitzhak Galanti (Hebrew: יצחק גלנטי; 12 February 1937 – 25 June 2012) was an Israeli politician who served as a member of the Knesset for Gil between 2006 and 2009.

== Biography ==
Born in Damascus in Syria, Galanti made aliyah to Mandatory Palestine on 5 May 1945. In 1981 he gained a BA in geography and political science from the University of Haifa. Nine years later he was awarded an MA in geology and archaeology at the same university.

In the 2006 elections he was placed fifth on Gil's list, and entered the Knesset as the party won seven seats. He headed the party's parliamentary group as chairman, and chaired the Knesset's Labour, Welfare and Health committee.

He lost his seat in the 2009 elections when the party failed to cross the electoral threshold.

Galanti lived in Nesher, and was divorced with three children.
