= Colette Avital =

Israeli diplomat and politician

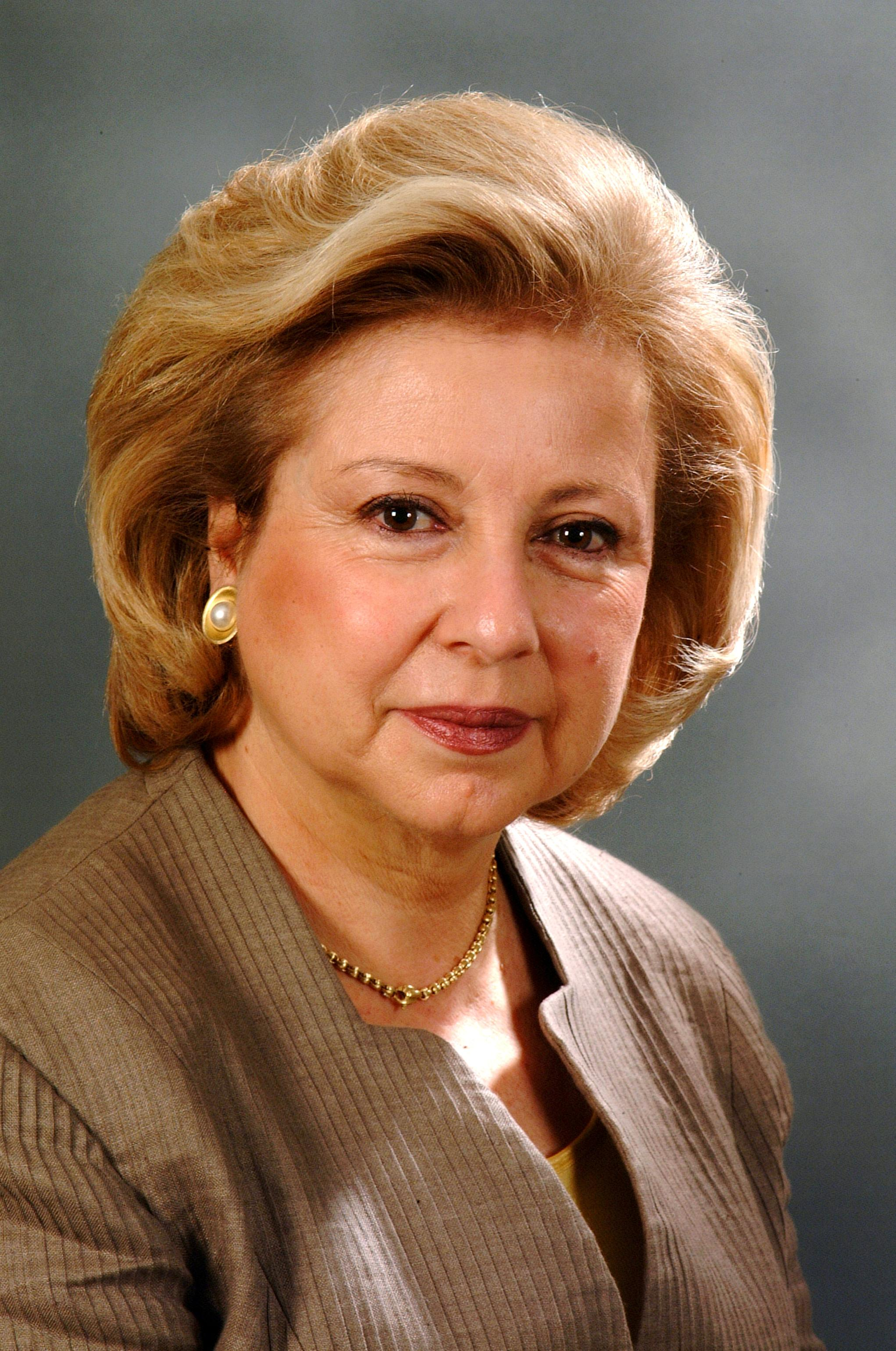
- Avital in 2002

Faction represented in the Knesset
- 1999–2001: One Israel
- 2001–2009: Labor Party

Personal details
- Born: 1 May 1939 (age 87) Bucharest, Romania

Colette Avital (Hebrew: קולט אביטל; born 1 May 1939) is a Romanian-Israeli diplomat and politician. She served as a member of the Knesset for the Labor Party and One Israel between 1999 and 2009.

== Life ==
Born in Bucharest, Romania, Avital made aliyah to Israel with her family in 1950. While still a student, she began working in the Ministry of Foreign Affairs as a secretary in order to cover the cost of her tuition. Over the years, she rose through the ranks at the ministry; she served with the Israeli delegation to Paris between 1982 and 1985, as ambassador to Portugal from 1988 until 1992, and as Consul General in New York City between 1992 and 1996. Upon returning to Israel, she was appointed Deputy Director in Charge of Western Europe, the third most important position in the ministry.

In 1999, Avital decided to run for the Knesset on behalf of the Labor Party, which formed the One Israel alliance together with Gesher and Meimad. Although she claimed 24th spot on the party list, Labor won only 23 seats in the May elections (One Israel won 26, of which two went to Gesher and one to Meimad) and Avital missed out. However, she entered the Knesset in November 1999 when Labor MK Matan Vilnai resigned. She served briefly as Chair of the Ethics Committee and headed the Investigative Commission for the Identification and Return of the Property of Holocaust Victims, which submitted its conclusions to the government in 2005. She chaired the Immigration, Absorption, and Diaspora Committee and in addition serves as the International Secretary of the Israeli Labor Party.

In 2007, Avital was a candidate in the Israeli presidential election, together with Shimon Peres and Reuven Rivlin, the first ever woman candidate for the Israeli presidency. Despite voices from her own party calling her to withdraw from the race in favor of ex-labor leader Shimon Peres, Avital remained in the race. After an undecided first round, Avital withdrew from the race and endorsed Peres' candidacy, Rivlin followed suit, and Peres won the second round of balloting.

In June 2007, as part of a public relation effort by the New York Israeli consulate, Maxim magazine published photographs of Israeli models, all soldiers in the Israeli Defence Forces in a feature titled "Women of the Israeli Defence Forces". The feature drew an angry reaction from Avital: "There are enough beautiful and interesting things we can use to tap this demographic than to show a half-naked woman in a magazine of this kind, considered pornographic".

Placed 19th on the list, she lost her seat in the 2009 elections when the party was reduced to 13 seats.

In October 2021 Avital claimed that Shimon Peres, who died in 2016, had sexually harassed her.

In April 2026 Avital was assaulted by the police during a demonstration in Tel Aviv against the war in Iran.
