= Dor (political party) =

Dor דור
- Leader: Efraim Lapid; Rafi Eitan; Nava Arad
- Founded: 1990s
- Headquarters: Tel Aviv
- Ideology: Pensioners' interests
- Political position: Center
- Most MKs: 7 (2006–2008)
- Fewest MKs: 4 (2008)
- Current MKs: 0

Election symbol
- זך

Website
- gimlaim.org.il

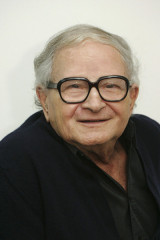
Rafi Eitan, former party leader

Dor (Hebrew: דור בונה הארץ, lit. 'Generation who Built the Land'), known as Gil (lit. 'Age', an abbreviation of Gimla'ey Yisrael LaKnesset (Hebrew: גימלאי ישראל לכנסת), lit. 'Pensioners of Israel to the Knesset') until 2012, is a centrist political party in Israel and was part of the governing coalition in the seventeenth Knesset. In the 2009 elections, Gil did not receive sufficient votes for representation in the Knesset. In preparation for the 2013 elections, the party was renamed Dor.

== Background ==
The party has been in existence in some form since the 1990s. It ran in the 1996 elections under the name Pensioners of Israel (Hebrew: גימלאי ישראל, Gimla'ey Israel), led by former Labor MK Nava Arad and including modern-day Gil MK Moshe Sharoni on its list. However, the party failed to cross the electoral threshold and did not win a seat. It did not contest the 1999 or January 2003 elections, though an unrelated party, Power for Pensioners, did run in the 1999 elections, failing to win a seat. Later in 2003, Power for Pensioners won a surprise victory in the municipal elections in Tel Aviv, defeating the party of mayor Ron Huldai.

The party announced that it would compete in the 2006 elections, and although opinion polls suggested that it might break the 2% threshold, it was not considered a serious contender for a significant number of seats. However, the party was the surprise package of the elections, and managed to win almost 186,000 votes and seven seats.

Much of the party's support came in the way of a protest vote among the young, particularly in Tel Aviv where nearly one in ten voters voted for the party. The party had actually encouraged voters to vote for their party rather than submit a blank ballot. Elderly Ashkenazi voters switching from the Labor after Amir Peretz's victory in the leadership contest may also have been a factor. The party was later fined 62,000 shekels for violating campaign financing laws.

As a result of the coalition talks with Kadima, Gil agreed to become a division of the Kadima party in return for the Health ministry and the newly created Ministry of Pensioners Affairs. Party leader Rafi Eitan became Minister of Pensioners Affairs, and Yaakov Ben-Yezri became Health Minister. Ben-Yezri, a confessed smoker, later caused controversy when he lit up during a television interview.

On 2 July 2008 three MKs (Moshe Sharoni, Elhanan Glazer and Sarah Marom-Shalev) left the party to establish the Justice for the Elderly faction. The new faction merged back into Gil on 27 October 2008, though Elhanan Glazer established another new faction, The Right Way, instead of rejoining Gil.

In the 2009 election, as Gil, the party received 17,571 votes (0.52%) losing all of its seats in the Knesset. The party ran as Dor in the 2013 election and fell to 5,975 votes (0.16%).

== Political principles ==
- Commitment to protecting pension rights.
- Concern for the right to housing for Israeli pensioners.
- Enlargement of national health insurance and services for pensioners.
- Protection of traditional Jewish values
- Advancement of democratic values.

== Election results ==
Election	Leader	Votes	%	Seats	+/–	Outcome
1996	Nava Arad	14,935	0.49 (#13)	0 / 120	New	Extraparliamentary
1999	Nava Arad	Did not contest				Extraparliamentary
2003	Nava Arad	Did not contest				Extraparliamentary
2006	Rafi Eitan	185,759	5.92 (#7)	7 / 120	▲7	Coalition
2009	Rafi Eitan	17,571	0.52 (#7)	0 / 120	▼7	Extraparliamentary
2013	Efraim Lapid	5,975	0.16 (#20)	0 / 120	Steady	Extraparliamentary
2015	Efraim Lapid	Did not contest				Extraparliamentary
