= Party lists for the 2003 Israeli legislative election =

The 2003 Israeli legislative election was held using closed list proportional representation. Each party presented a list of candidates to the Central Elections Committee prior to the election.

== Likud ==
The Likud list was led by Ariel Sharon.

1. Ariel Sharon
2. Benjamin Netanyahu
3. Tzachi Hanegbi
4. Silvan Shalom
5. Dan Naveh
6. Limor Livnat
7. Israel Katz
8. Gideon Ezra
9. Naomi Blumenthal
10. Uzi Landau
11. Gila Gamliel
12. Yuval Steinitz
13. Tzipi Livni
14. Michael Eitan
15. Meir Sheetrit
16. David Levy
17. Ruhama Avraham
18. Gideon Sa'ar
19. Daniel Benlulu
20. Michael Ratzon
21. Majalli Wahabi
22. Yaakov Edri
23. Ehud Yatom
24. Eli Aflalo
25. Moshe Kachlon
26. Omri Sharon
27. Michael Gorlovsky
28. Gilad Erdan
29. Roni Bar-On
30. Inbal Gavrieli
31. Yehiel Hazan
32. Ehud Olmert
33. Ze'ev Boim
34. Avraham Hirschson
35. Lea Nass
36. Reuven Rivlin
37. Haim Katz
38. Ayoob Kara
39. Pnina Rosenblum
40. Eitan Sulami
41. Avigdor Kahalani
42. Zion Pinyan
43. David Mena
44. Shlomo Durani
45. Roni Milo
46. Yosef Ahimeir
47. Shai Bezek
48. Eli Artzi
49. Sima Navon
50. David Omer
51. Yaakov Ben-Gur
52. Zalman Shoval
53. Yehiel Lasri
54. Eli Tzair Cohen
55. Eitan Ettinger
56. Gabriel Evital
57. Lior Katsav
58. Meir Vered
59. Danny Danon
60. Yair Hazan
61. Haim Bashari
62. Haim Cohen
63. Voronobi Antana
64. Eitan Lasri
65. Daher Ziyyad
66. Ayelet Amram
67. Avi Ben Avraham
68. Yaakov Bardugo
69. Adam Shaul
70. Mali Pinto
71. Altres Vika
72. David Re'em
73. Dan-Eli Ben-Shevo
74. David Rechter
75. Eliahu Suissa
76. Tamir Tsila
77. Yisraeli Rubi
78. Yaron Ilana
79. Ronen Nehamat
80. Ayelet Galili

== Labor ==
The Israeli Labor Party's list was headed by Amram Mitzna. The list was a joint list with the smaller Meimad party.

1. Amram Mitzna
2. Binyamin Ben-Eliezer
3. Shimon Peres
4. Matan Vilnai
5. Avraham Burg
6. Dalia Itzik
7. Ofir Pines-Paz
8. Ephraim Sneh
9. Yuli Tamir
10. Michael Melchior
11. Isaac Herzog
12. Haim Ramon
13. Danny Yatom
14. Eitan Cabel
15. Avraham Shochat
16. Colette Avital
17. Shalom Simhon
18. Orit Noked
19. Eli Ben-Menachem
20. Raleb Majadele
21. Salah Tarif
22. Sofa Landver
23. Weizman Shiry
24. Avi Yehezkel
25. Efi Oshaya
26. Shmuel Abuav
27. Tova Ilan
28. Ronen Tzur
29. Shula Cohen
30. Dani Koren
31. Orna Angel
32. Neta Dobrin
33. Benny Levin
34. Lama Lagshiel
35. Ali Hussein Hujirat
36. Amir Eliyahu
37. Shimon Sheetrit
38. Yigal Tzhor
39. Einat Wilf
40. Daniel Cohen

== Shinui ==
The Shinui list was led by Tommy Lapid.

1. Tommy Lapid
2. Avraham Poraz
3. Yehudit Naot
4. Yosef Paritzky
5. Eliezer Sandberg
6. Victor Brailovsky
7. Ilan Shalgi
8. Meli Polishook-Bloch
9. Reshef Hen
10. Roni Brizon
11. Ehud Rassabi
12. Eti Livni
13. Ilan Leibovitch
14. Hemi Doron
15. Yigal Yasinov
16. Erela Golan
17. Aharona Barda
18. Adir Binyamini
19. Ikky Elner
20. Hamdan Munir
21. Ron Levinthal
22. Shahaf Farkash
23. Sergey Bihovsky
24. Boaz Atzmon
25. Arnon Sadeh
26. Leah Sela
27. Yehuda Segal
28. Yitzhak Rabinovich
29. Shimon Yigal
30. Simona Yulanda

== Shas ==
The Shas list was led by Eli Yishai.

1. Eli Yishai
2. Shlomo Benizri
3. Nissim Dahan
4. Amnon Cohen
5. Yitzhak Cohen
6. David Azulai
7. Meshulam Nahari
8. Yitzhak Vaknin
9. Yair Peretz
10. Nissim Ze'ev
11. Yaakov Margi
12. Ofer Hugi
13. Pinhas Tzabari
14. Yoav Ben-Tzur
15. Lior Gabbay
16. Rafael Malachi
17. Shmuel Ben Atar
18. David Yifrah
19. Mazor Bahaina
20. David Telkar
21. Benny Elharar
22. Hayat Giltberg
23. Boris Yitzhakov
24. Yehuda Ohana
25. Yitzhak Sudri

== National Union ==
The National Union alliance's list was led by Avigdor Lieberman.

1. Avigdor Lieberman
2. Binyamin Elon
3. Yuri Stern
4. Zvi Hendel
5. Michael Nudelman
6. Uri Ariel
7. Aryeh Eldad
8. Eliezer Cohen
9. Esterina Tartman
10. Uri Bank
11. Daniel Reuven
12. Alexander Epstein
13. Dudu Saada
14. Nina Martitenko
15. Yaakov Bar Shimon

== Meretz ==
The Meretz list was led by Yossi Sarid. The list was a joint list with Democratic Choice and the Shahar Movement.

1. Yossi Sarid
2. Haim Oron
3. Ran Cohen
4. Zehava Gal-On
5. Roman Bronfman
6. Avshalom Vilan
7. Ilan Gilon
8. Mossi Raz
9. Naomi Chazan
10. Hussniya Jabara
11. Yossi Beilin
12. Yael Dayan
13. Michal Shochat
14. Yoav Kreim
15. Uzi Even
16. Issawi Frej
17. Negist Mengesha
18. Evgeny Melamud
19. Gaby Lasky
20. Shosh Arar
21. Dina Abekasis
22. Idan Lamdan
23. Grigory Bernboym
24. Leah Wolfson
25. Shmuel Sprontzin
26. Suhil Karm
27. Ahuva Levy
28. Michal Rozin
29. Robert Abergel
30. Mansour Malik

== National Religious Party ==
The National Religious Party list was led by Effi Eitam.

1. Effi Eitam
2. Zevulun Orlev
3. Shaul Yahalom
4. Yitzhak Levy
5. Gila Finkelstein
6. Nissan Slomiansky
7. Eliyahu Gabai
8. Yigal Bibi
9. Shmaryahu Ben-Tzur
10. Haim Pollak
11. Yehudit Shilat
12. Aryeh Farjun
13. Yaffa Peretz
14. Idan Moshe
15. Aharon Gimani

== United Torah Judaism ==
The United Torah Judaism list was led by Yaakov Litzman.

1. Yaakov Litzman
2. Avraham Ravitz
3. Meir Porush
4. Moshe Gafni
5. Yisrael Eichler
6. Shmuel Halpert
7. Uri Maklev
8. Ya'akov Cohen
9. Zvi Boimel
10. Abo Yosef
11. Avraham Schwartz
12. Mordechai Kerlitz
13. Baruch Folk
14. Avraham Rubinstein
15. Yosef Kopenberg

== Hadash-Ta'al ==
The joint Hadash-Ta'al list was led by Mohammad Barakeh.

1. Mohammad Barakeh
2. Issam Makhoul
3. Ahmad Tibi
4. Dov Khenin
5. Tagerid Shevita
6. Youssef Atauna
7. Osama Saadi
8. Abdullah Abu Ma'aruf
9. Yishai Manukhin
10. Ali Kheidar

== One Nation ==
The One Nation list was led by Amir Peretz.

1. Amir Peretz
2. Ilana Cohen
3. David Tal
4. Adisu Massala
5. Ora Namir
6. Leon Marozovsky
7. Hassib Aboud
8. Sami Halabi
9. Leon Litinetsky
10. Ruti Agmon

== Balad ==
The Balad list was led by Azmi Bishara.

1. Azmi Bishara
2. Jamal Zahalka
3. Wasil Taha
4. Efnan Agrabiyeh
5. Fathi Deka
6. Abdallah Shaheen
7. Makhsan Keis
8. Juma Azbarga
9. Haj Yahya Faheem
10. Fukra Abed Raheem

== Yisrael BaAliyah ==
The Yisrael BaAliyah list was led by Natan Sharansky.

1. Natan Sharansky
2. Yuli Edelstein
3. Marina Solodkin
4. Gennady Riger
5. Ali Kashdan

== Ra'am ==
The Ra'am list was led by Abdulmalik Dehamshe.

1. Abdulmalik Dehamshe
2. Taleb el-Sana
3. Salman Abu Ahmed
4. Muhamad Kanan
5. Ibrahim Elamud

== Extraparliamentary parties ==
The following are parties which won no seats in the 2003 election.

=== Ale Yarok ===
The Ale Yarok list was led by Boaz Wachtel.

1. Boaz Wachtel
2. Dan Goldenbert
3. Hila Doron
4. Shai Hakim
5. Shai Elad

=== Herut – The National Movement ===
The Herut – The National Movement lis was led by Michael Kleiner.

1. Michael Kleiner
2. Baruch Marzel
3. Sa'ar Eliyahu
4. Michael Ben-Ari
5. Elyonor Shifrin

=== Progressive National Alliance ===
The Progressive National Alliance list was led by Hashem Mahameed.

1. Hashem Mahameed
2. Osman Hussein
3. Ahmed Hijazi
4. Anat Athmana
5. Tawfik Qassoum

=== The Greens ===
The 'The Greens' list was led by Pe'er Visner.

1. Pe'er Visner
2. Hadas Shaknai
3. Tzur Shezaf
4. Pascal Berkovitch
5. Shmuel Vilozny
6. Moshe Eliman
7. Yaakov Plesker

=== Yisrael Aheret ===
The Yisrael Aheret list was led by Boaz Tselal.

1. Boaz Tselal
2. Eitan Ginzburg
3. Itay Ben-Horin
4. Ofer Even
5. Eyal Naveh

=== Ahavat Yisrael ===
The Ahavat Yisrael list was led by Yosef Kaduri.

1. Yosef Kaduri
2. Omer Meir Michel
3. Rafael Bar-el
4. Shimon Balti
5. Dan Ben-Eliyahu

=== Tzomet ===
The Tzomet list was led by Moshe Gerin.

1. Moshe Gerin
2. Haim Adini
3. Zehava Zarhi
4. Sagi Krep
5. Gila Gvita

=== Center Party ===
The Center Party list was led by David Magen.

1. David Magen
2. Avraham Albert Tobol
3. Alexander Tentser
4. Larissa Tsporavsky
5. Moshe Peretz

=== Da'am ===
The Da'am list was led by Asma Agbarieh.

1. Asma Agbarieh
2. Nir Nader
3. Khatib Samiyyeh
4. Hadas Adiv Lahav
5. Khatem Na'amana

=== Citizen and State ===
The Citizen and State list was led by Alexander Tzinker.

1. Alexander Tzinker
2. Alexander Atterman
3. Vyacheslav Primassler
4. Michal Seltser
5. Irina Bluzor

=== Man's Rights in the Family Party ===
The Man's Rights in the Family Party list was led by Yaakov Schlusser.

1. Yaakov Schlusser
2. Avikazer El-Hai
3. Avraham Torati
4. Shmuel Greenberg
5. Haim Arika
6. Oded Davidson
7. Siom Tedala

=== Lehava ===
The Levhava list was led by Avraham Ovadia.

1. Avraham Ovadia
2. Don Judy Gulia
3. Mordechai Ashkenazi
4. Maya Ben-Zion
5. Yarden Eylon

=== Za'am ===
The Za'am list was led by Yoram Parianti.

1. Yoram Parianti
2. Omer Daniel
3. David Bergman
4. Ehud Shriki
5. Ramadan El-Sayed

=== Leader ===
The Leader list was led by Alexander Radko.

1. Alexander Radko
2. Evgeny Schpitz
3. Sergey Mor
4. Alexander Berginsky
5. Albert Gofman
