= Party lists for the 2006 Israeli legislative election =

The 2006 Israeli legislative election was held using closed list proportional representation. Each party presented a list of candidates to the Central Elections Committee prior to the election.

== Kadima ==
The Kadima list was headed by Ehud Olmert.

1. Ehud Olmert
2. Shimon Peres
3. Tzipi Livni
4. Meir Sheetrit
5. Avi Dichter
6. Marina Solodkin
7. Haim Ramon
8. Shaul Mofaz
9. Tzachi Hanegbi
10. Avraham Hirschson
11. Uriel Reichman
12. Gideon Ezra
13. Roni Bar-On
14. Dalia Itzik
15. Ze'ev Boim
16. Yaakov Edri
17. Zeev Elkin
18. Majalli Wahabi
19. Ruhama Avraham
20. Menachem Ben-Sasson
21. Shlomo Breznitz
22. Eli Aflalo
23. David Tal
24. Avigdor Yitzhaki
25. Ronit Tirosh
26. Otniel Schneller
27. Michael Nudelman
28. Amira Dotan
29. Yoel Hasson
30. Shai Hermesh
31. Isaac Ben-Israel
32. Yohanan Plesner
33. Shlomo Molla
34. Dan Ben-David
35. Rachel Adato
36. Rina Faiman
37. Lior Carmel
38. Liat Yonit
39. Shay Avital
40. Yulia Shamalov-Berkovich
41. Ehud Barzilai
42. Yosef Tamir
43. Shlomo Gurevitz
44. Anastassia Michaeli
45. Avraham Krampa
46. Shmuel Rifman
47. Rafi Elul
48. Uri Sheetrit
49. Yitzhak Haddad
50. Amir Halevi
51. Ahmed Dabbah
52. Gideon Doron
53. Yehuda Shavit
54. Dror Gal
55. Harel Vizel
56. Kahid Dahar
57. Moshe Konforti
58. Yitzhak Vanunu
59. Aharon Ben-Hemo
60. Michael Tsoller
61. Solomon Abramovich
62. Avner Hayat
63. Nissim Alhadif
64. Yosef Schnir
65. Hava Luzon
66. Assaf Zamir
67. Yitzhak Peretz
68. Haim Sagi
69. Shmuel Shertolovich
70. Adi Livai

== Labor ==
The Israeli Labor Party's list was headed by Amir Peretz. The list was a joint list with the smaller Meimad party.

1. Amir Peretz
2. Isaac Herzog
3. Ophir Pines-Paz
4. Avishay Braverman
5. Yuli Tamir
6. Ami Ayalon
7. Eitan Cabel
8. Binyamin Ben-Eliezer
9. Shelly Yachimovich
10. Michael Melchior
11. Matan Vilnai
12. Colette Avital
13. Ephraim Sneh
14. Danny Yatom
15. Nadia Hilou
16. Shalom Simhon
17. Orit Noked
18. Yoram Marciano
19. Raleb Majadele
20. Shachiv Shnaan
21. Leon Litinetsky
22. Avi Yehezkel
23. Moshe Samia
24. Avi Bitsor
25. Baruch Zalts
26. Gideon Ben-Yisrael
27. Lior Shtrassbebrg
28. Gershon Gelman
29. Hassib Abud
30. Meir Babiof
31. Anna Goldgur
32. Haim Eylon
33. Ofer Galantz
34. Yuval Elbashan
35. Einat Wilf
36. Alon Abutbul
37. Yosef Vanunu
38. Esther Biran
39. Ruth Dayan Madar
40. Aryeh Amit
41. Avi Shaked
42. Adisu Massala
43. Ofer Kornfeld
44. Nahum Assad
45. Adin Shpiegelman
46. Eitan Broshi
47. Ariel Pikar
48. Mordechai Groberg
49. Binyamin Levin
50. Amnon Zakh

== Shas ==
The Shas list was headed by Aryeh Deri.

1. Aryeh Deri
2. Yitzhak Cohen
3. Amnon Cohen
4. Meshulam Nahari
5. Ariel Atias
6. Shlomo Benizri
7. David Azulai
8. Yitzhak Vaknin
9. Nissim Ze'ev
10. Yaakov Margi
11. Emil Amsalem
12. Avraham Michaeli
13. Mazor Bahaina
14. Yair Peretz
15. Avigdor Ohana
16. David Tlaker
17. Rafael Malachi
18. David Sheetrit
19. Eitan Barda
20. Binyamin Elharar
21. Yoram Menachem
22. Yitzhak Avidani
23. David Ohanuna
24. Ariel Deri
25. Ami Biton

== Likud ==
The Likud list was headed by Benjamin Netanyahu.

1. Benjamin Netanyahu
2. Silvan Shalom
3. Moshe Kachlon
4. Gilad Erdan
5. Gideon Sa'ar
6. Michael Eitan
7. Reuven Rivlin
8. Dan Naveh
9. Yuval Steinitz
10. Limor Livnat
11. Natan Sharansky
12. Israel Katz
13. Haim Katz
14. Uzi Landau
15. Yuli Edelstein
16. Daniel Benlulu
17. Lea Nass
18. Naomi Blumenthal
19. Eitan Sulami
20. Gabriel Avital
21. Yaakov Ben-Gur
22. David Maimon
23. Samir Kadiba
24. Keren Barak
25. Danny Danon
26. Zion Pinyan
27. David Even Tsur
28. Andrey Ozen
29. Malka Pinto
30. Shmuel Slavin
31. Hasdai Eliezer
32. Ehud Yatom
33. Michael Ratzon
34. Ayelet Galili
35. Sagiv Asulin
36. David Levy
37. David Mena
38. Gila Gamliel
39. Ayoob Kara
40. Eli Moyal
41. Carmel Shama
42. David Bitan
43. Yariv Levin
44. Roni Stern
45. Eliyahu Dadon

== Yisrael Beitenu ==
The Yisrael Beiteinu list was headed by Avigdor Lieberman.

1. Avigdor Lieberman
2. Yuri Stern
3. Yisrael Hasson
4. Yosef Shagal
5. Esterina Tartman
6. Stas Misezhnikov
7. Sofa Landver
8. Yitzhak Aharonovich
9. Robert Ilatov
10. Alex Miller
11. Lia Shemtov
12. David Rotem
13. Ilya Bronstein
14. Yigal Yasinov
15. Matzliach Emmanuel
16. Tal Nahum
17. Irina Efrimov
18. Ilya Shechugal
19. Michael Grossman
20. Ariel Nudelman
21. Yuri Goldstein
22. Klara Tikhonovich
23. Eliezer Cohen

== National Union - NRP ==
The joint National Union - National Religious Party list was headed by Binyamin Elon.

1. Binyamin Elon
2. Zevulun Orlev
3. Zvi Hendel
4. Effi Eitam
5. Nissan Slomiansky
6. Yitzhak Levy
7. Eliyahu Gabai
8. Aryeh Eldad
9. Uri Ariel
10. Gila Finkelstein
11. Shaul Yahalom
12. Yehuda Lieberman
13. Orit Strook
14. Moti Yogev
15. Shmaryahu Ben-Tzur
16. Uri Bank
17. Alexander Epstein
18. Yaffa Peretz
19. David Bohnik
20. Yehoar Gal

== Gil ==
The Gil list was headed by Rafi Eitan.

1. Rafi Eitan
2. Ya'akov Ben-Yezri
3. Moshe Sharoni
4. Yitzhak Ziv
5. Yitzhak Galanti
6. Elhanan Glazer
7. Sarah Marom-Shalev
8. Yaakov Ashri
9. Nissan Yehezkeli
10. Haftzi Ba Ben Nun
11. Nissim Sasbon
12. Gad Gafni
13. Uri Krauthammer
14. Rafael Sherman
15. Yitzhak Kritsvaky
16. Menachem Shalom

== United Torah Judaism ==
The United Torah Judaism list was headed by Yaakov Litzman.

1. Yaakov Litzman
2. Avraham Ravitz
3. Meir Porush
4. Moshe Gafni
5. Shmuel Halpert
6. Ya'akov Cohen
7. Uri Maklev
8. Yehoshua Pollack
9. Yaakov Asher Guterman
10. Shimon Haddad
11. Eliezer Moses
12. Aryeh Zvi Boimel
13. Yehoshua Koperberg
14. Mordechai Kerlitz
15. Avraham Schwartz

== Meretz ==
The Meretz list was headed by Yossi Beilin.

1. Yossi Beilin
2. Haim Oron
3. Ran Cohen
4. Zehava Galon
5. Avshalom Vilan
6. Tzvia Greenfield
7. Issawi Frej
8. Ilan Gilon
9. Michal Rozin
10. Mossi Raz
11. Gaby Lasky
12. Shaul Arieli
13. Ella Shaiansky
14. Shaul Eizenberg
15. Abd Elhadi Zoabi
16. Michal Eden
17. Uri Zaki
18. Leah Wolfson
19. Eyal Oron
20. Radi Spori

== Ra'am-Ta'al ==
The joint United Arab List-Ta'al joint list was headed by Ibrahim Sarsur.

1. Ibrahim Sarsur
2. Ahmad Tibi
3. Taleb el-Sana
4. Abbas Zakour
5. Salman Abu-Ahmed
6. Bassel Darawsha
7. Yosef Shaheen
8. Mahmood Mawasi
9. Hassan Hagali
10. Yosef Fadilla

== Hadash ==
The Hadash list was led by Mohammad Barakeh.

1. Mohammad Barakeh
2. Hana Sweid
3. Dov Khenin
4. Afu Agbaria
5. Youssef Atauna
6. Manael Shalabi
7. Dahil Abu-Zayed
8. Abdullah Abu Ma'aruf
9. Yishai Manuchin
10. Edna Zaritsky

== Balad ==
The Balad list was led by Azmi Bishara.

1. Azmi Bishara
2. Jamal Zahalka
3. Wasil Taha
4. Said Nafa
5. Juma Azbarga
6. Abd Alrahim Fukra
7. Mahsan Raboos
8. Mazen Ghnaim
9. Inas Hajj
10. Fuad Sultani

== Extraparliamentary parties ==
The following are parties which won no seats in the 2006 election.

=== Shinui ===
The Shinui list was led by Ron Levinthal.

1. Ron Levinthal
2. Ehud Rassabi
3. Ilan Leibovitch
4. Sharon Olshveng
5. Aryeh Gilat
6. Boaz Etzmon
7. Jonathan Danilowitz
8. Munir Hamdan
9. Orna Davidai
10. Yaakov Sabo

=== Green Party ===
The Green Party list was led by Pe'er Visner.

1. Pe'er Visner
2. Hadas Shaknai
3. Urian Kantzpolaski
4. Raul Rodriguez
5. Sofi Tsedaka
6. Dror Yehezkel
7. Shelly Federman
8. Shoshana Carmeli
9. Yaakov Plesker
10. Guy Verasnu

=== Ale Yarok ===
The Ale Yarok list was led by Boaz Wachtel.

1. Boaz Wachtel
2. Shlomi Sandak
3. Ohad Shem-Tov
4. Lior Perry
5. Olga Vilenkin
6. Barak Lebovitz
7. Lior Branholtz
8. Eylon Gilad
9. Hagar Zimmerman
10. Berri Freizinger

=== Jewish National Front ===
The Jewish National Front list was led by Baruch Marzel.

1. Baruch Marzel
2. Israel Hanukoglu
3. Michael Ben-Ari
4. Rahamim Cohen
5. Chen Ben-Eliyahu
6. Elyonor Shiffrin
7. Paul Idelberg
8. Shlomo Lienski
9. Ben Zion Gopstein
10. Michael Pinto

=== Tafnit ===
The Tafnit list was headed by Uzi Dayan.

1. Uzi Dayan
2. Esther Peretz
3. Yehuda Gilad
4. Leonid Bravstein
5. Mordechai Elgrably
6. Aryeh Shomer
7. Adi Barshadsky
8. Rimon Jurban
9. Alexander Ron
10. Shimon Oderi

=== Atid Ehad ===
The Atid Ehad list was led by Avraham Neguise.

1. Avraham Neguise
2. Yehezkel Shteltzer
3. Yosef Abramowitz
4. Darga Retta
5. Baruch Freund
6. Zaudo Ebona
7. Yishai Fleisher
8. Linda Eliasuf
9. Michael Homphries
10. Michael Korinadli

=== Hetz ===
The Hetz party was led by Avraham Poraz.

1. Avraham Poraz
2. Roni Brizon
3. Ilan Shalgi
4. Meli Polishook-Bloch
5. Victor Brailovsky
6. Eti Livni
7. Erela Golan
8. Ronit Anafreud Cohen
9. Irit Malka Nasi
10. Igor Glider

=== Justice for All ===
The Justice for All list was led by Yaakov Schlosser.

1. Yaakov Schlosser
2. Yitzhak Malik
3. Yaakov Ben-Isaschar
4. Ilan Lev Feldman
5. Simon Pony

=== Da'am Workers' Party ===
The Da'am Workers Party list was led by Asma Agbarieh.

1. Asma Agbarieh
2. Nir Nader
3. Samia Khatib
4. Munir Qawar
5. Malek Murad

=== Herut - The National Movement ===
The Herut – The National Movement list was led by Michael Kleiner.

1. Michael Kleiner
2. Yehoshua Meiri
3. Avraham Manor
4. Yana Khodirker-Knafo
5. Yisrael Cohen

=== Lev ===
The Lev list was led by Eliezer Levinger.

1. Eliezer Levinger
2. Maya Ben-Zion
3. Haim Ayelet
4. Irina Tabechnikov
5. David Yosef

=== Brit Olam ===
The Brit Olam list was led by Ofer Lifschitz.

1. Ofer Lifschitz
2. Rafa'a Halabi
3. Meir Ben Zikhri
4. Nadia Ziadat
5. Ruhala Turgeman

=== Lev ===
The HaLev list was led by Ovadia Fathoov.

1. Ovadia Fathoov
2. Yohai Tahor
3. Rafik Aminov
4. Baruch Chai Pinhasov
5. Alex Bariev
6. Neriya Moloknadov
7. Yeniniya Kantov

=== Lehem ===
The Lehem list was led by Yisrael Twitto

1. Yisrael Twitto
2. Ilan Zehavi
3. Rina Becher
4. Avraham Levi
5. Aaron Shcwartz

=== Tzomet ===
The Tzomet list was led by Moshe Gerin.

1. Moshe Gerin
2. Yaakov Tzemach
3. Yaakov Eliyahu Rozenold
4. Vladimir Herzberg
5. Sigal Ekal

=== The New Zionism ===
The 'The New Zionism' list was led by Yaakov Kfir.

1. Yaakov Kfir
2. Moshe Ahishahar
3. Zvi Kfir
4. Masoud Habib
5. Zvi Laufman

=== Oz LaAniyim ===
The Oz LaAniyim list was led by Felix Engel.

1. Felix Engel
2. Avraham Ami Peretz
3. Ilan Bronson
4. Yitzhak Nagish
5. Charlie Abergel

=== Arab National Party ===
The Arab National Party list was led by Muhamad Kanan.

1. Muhamad Kanan
2. Salah Bdarana
3. Zayyid Atallah
4. Wadi Pinhas Moskowitz
5. Hilwa Elias

=== Leader ===
The Leader list was led by Alexander Radko.

1. Alexander Radko
2. Evgeny Shpitz
3. Valery Ibeshkin
4. Moshe-Morris Azulay
5. Lev Avermazon
