= Thirtieth government of Israel =

2003–06 government formed by Ariel Sharon

Second Sharon Cabinet
- 30th Cabinet of Israel

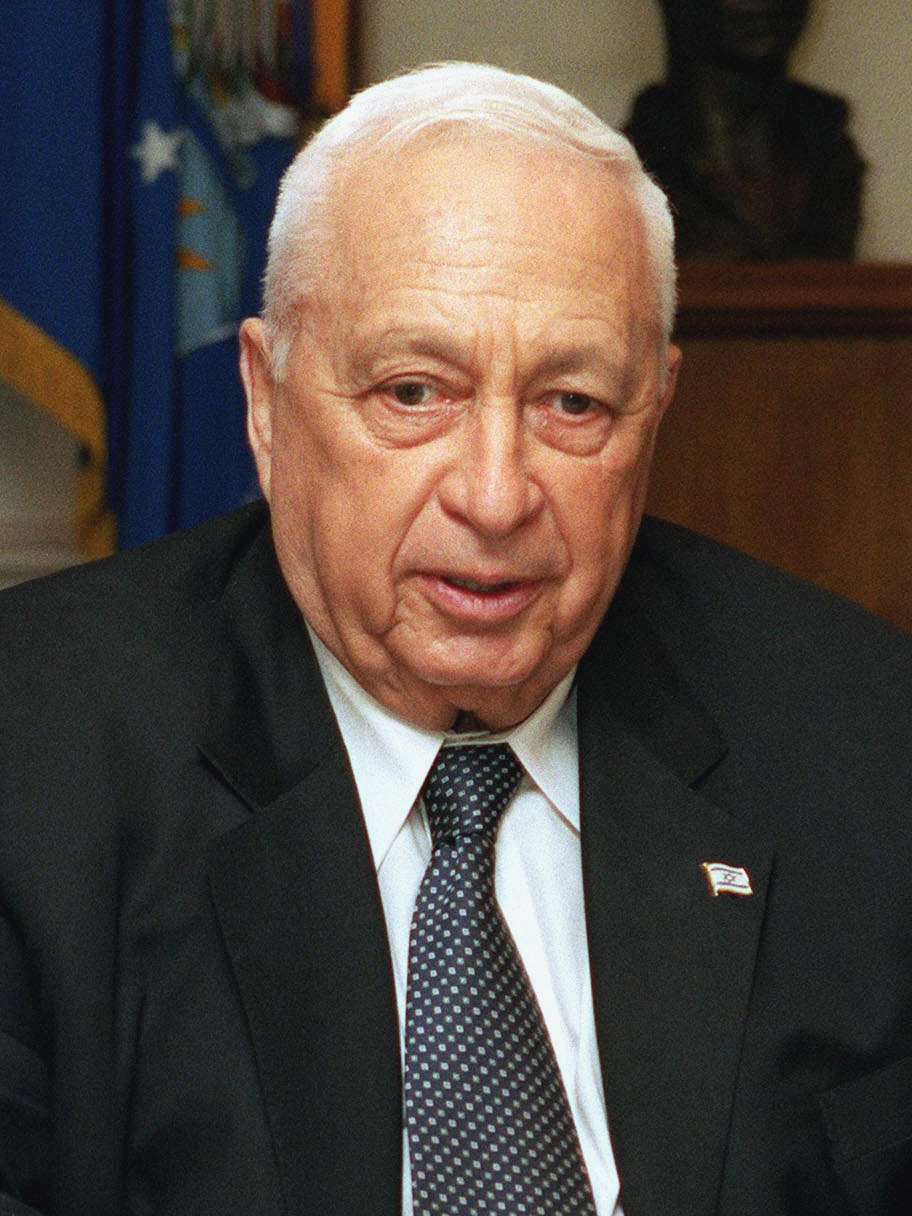
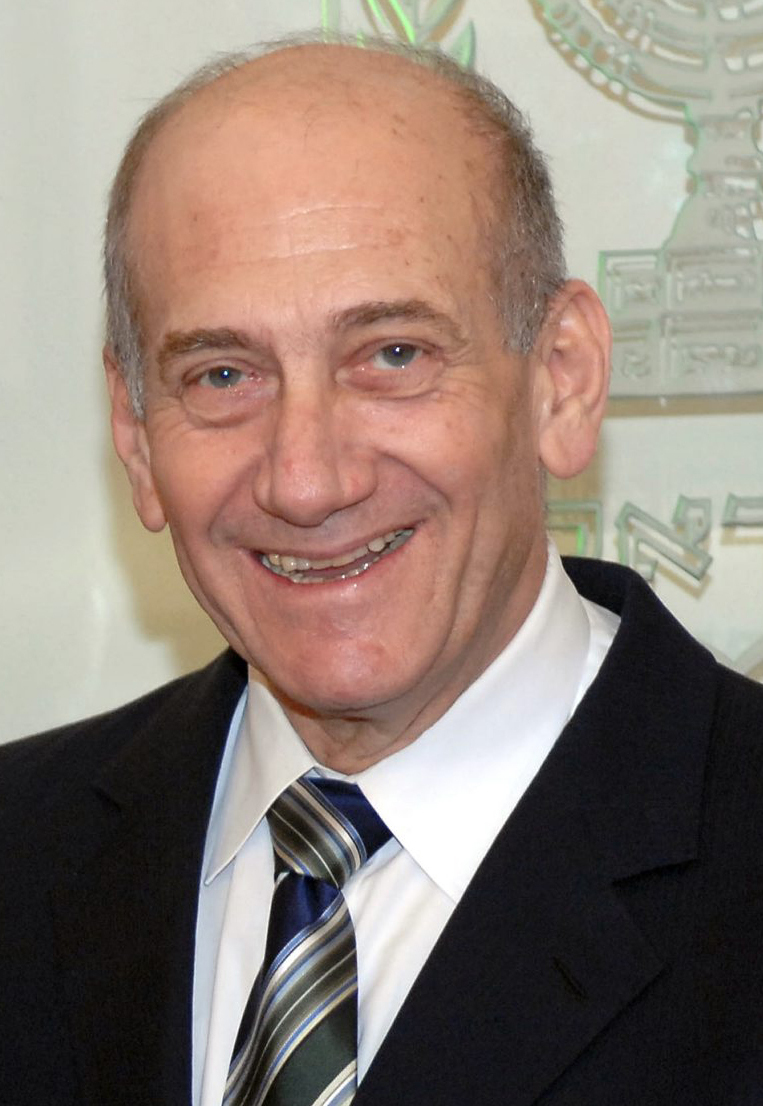
- Date formed: 28 February 2003
- Date dissolved: 4 May 2006

People and organisations
- Head of state: Moshe Katsav
- Head of government: Ariel Sharon (de facto until 4 January 2006); Ehud Olmert (de facto after 4 January 2006)
- Member parties: Likud (until 15 January 2006); Kadima; Labor-Meimad (10 January–25 November 2005); Shinui (until 4 December 2004); National Union (until 6 June 2004); National Religious Party (until 11 November 2004)
- Status in legislature: Coalition government
- Opposition cabinet: Shadow Cabinet of Tommy Lapid
- Opposition leader: Amram Mitzna (until 11 May 2003); Dalia Itzik (until 19 June 2003); Shimon Peres (until 9 January 2005); Tommy Lapid (until 22 November 2005); Amir Peretz (until 3 May 2006)

History
- Election: 2003
- Legislature term: 16th Knesset
- Predecessor: 29th cabinet of Israel
- Successor: 31st cabinet of Israel

The thirtieth government of Israel was formed by Ariel Sharon on 28 February 2003, following Likud's comprehensive victory in the January elections. His coalition initially included Shinui and the National Union, holding 60 of the 120 seats in the Knesset, whilst the two-seat Yisrael BaAliyah merged into Likud shortly after. The National Religious Party also joined the coalition on 3 March 2003, taking the number of seats it held up to 66. The parties formed a center-right coalition.

The government became increasingly unstable due to the Gaza disengagement plan, with the National Union leaving the coalition on 6 June 2004, and the National Religious Party following on 11 November. On 4 December Shinui also left the government following disagreements over the budget. On 10 January 2005, Labor–Meimad joined the government, and was joined by Agudat Yisrael on 30 March.

On 23 November 2005 Sharon and several other ministers left Likud to establish Kadima (initially known as National Responsibility), remaining in control of the government. Although Labor-Meimad left the government on the same day, Sharon remained in control until suffering a stroke on 4 January 2006, at which point Acting Prime Minister Ehud Olmert took temporary control. Although Likud left the government on 15 January, Olmert became Interim Prime Minister on 16 April, and remained head of the government until he formed the thirty-first government on 4 May 2006, following Kadima's victory in the March elections.

Israeli government formation, 2003
- 28 February 2003
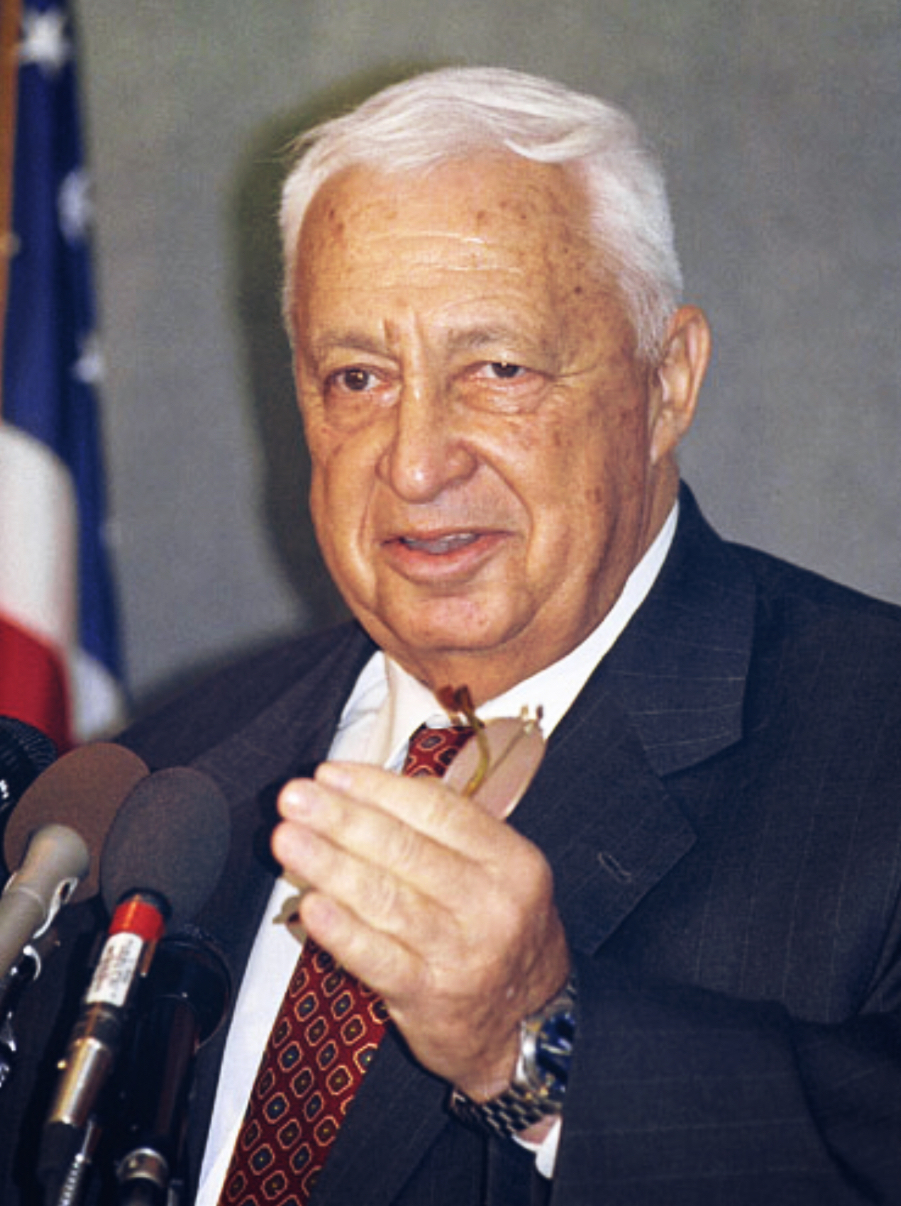

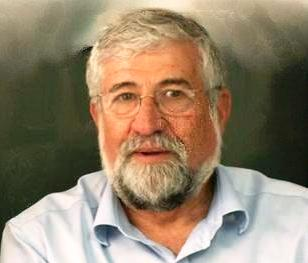
Nominee	Ariel Sharon	Amram Mitzna
Party	Likud	Labor
Electoral vote	66	54
Percentage	55.0%	45.0%
Prime Minister before election
Ariel Sharon
Likud
Elected Prime Minister
Ariel Sharon
Likud

== Cabinet members ==
Position	Person	Party
Prime Minister	Ariel Sharon (until 16 April 2006)	Likud, Kadima
Prime Minister	Ehud Olmert (interim from 16 April 2006)	Kadima
Vice Prime Minister	Shimon Peres (10 January - 23 November 2005)	Labor-Meimad
Acting Prime Minister	Ehud Olmert (until 16 April 2006)	Likud, Kadima
Deputy Prime Minister	Tommy Lapid (until 4 December 2004)	Shinui
Deputy Prime Minister	Silvan Shalom (until 15 January 2006)	Likud
Minister of Agriculture	Israel Katz (until 14 January 2006)	Likud
Minister of Agriculture	Ze'ev Boim (from 18 January 2006)	Kadima
Minister of Communications	Ariel Sharon (until 17 August 2003)	Likud
Minister of Communications	Ehud Olmert (29 September 2003 - 10 January 2005)	Likud
Minister of Communications	Dalia Itzik (10 January - 23 November 2005)	Labor-Meimad
Minister of Communications	Avraham Hirschson (from 18 January 2006)	Kadima
Minister of Defense	Shaul Mofaz	Not an MK
Minister of Education, Culture and Sport	Limor Livnat (until 14 January 2006)	Likud
Minister of Education, Culture and Sport	Meir Sheetrit (from 18 January 2006)	Kadima
Minister of the Environment	Yehudit Naot (until 17 October 2004)	Shinui
Minister of the Environment	Ilan Shalgi (29 November 2004 - 4 December 2005)	Shinui
Minister of the Environment	Shalom Simhon (10 January - 23 November 2005)	Labor-Meimad
Minister of the Environment	Gideon Ezra (from 18 January 2006)	Kadima
Minister of Finance	Benjamin Netanyahu (until 9 August 2005)	Likud
Minister of Finance	Ehud Olmert (from 7 November 2005)	Likud, Kadima
Minister in the Finance Ministry	Meir Sheetrit (until 5 July 2004)	Likud
Minister of Foreign Affairs	Silvan Shalom (until 15 January 2006)	Likud
Minister of Foreign Affairs	Tzipi Livni (from 18 January 2006)	Kadima
Minister of Health	Dan Naveh (until 14 January 2006)	Likud
Minister of Health	Ya'akov Edri (from 18 January 2006)	Kadima
Minister of Housing and Construction	Effi Eitam (3 March 2003 - 10 June 2004)	National Religious Party
Minister of Housing and Construction	Tzipi Livni (31 August 2004 - 10 January 2005)	Likud
Minister of Housing and Construction	Isaac Herzog (10 January - 23 November 2005)	Labor-Meimad
Minister of Housing and Construction	Ze'ev Boim (from 18 January 2006)	Kadima
Minister of Immigrant Absorption	Tzipi Livni	Likud, Kadima
Minister of Industry, Trade and Labour	Ehud Olmert	Likud, Kadima
Minister of Internal Affairs	Avraham Poraz (until 4 December 2004)	Shinui
Minister of Internal Affairs	Ophir Pines-Paz (10 January - 23 November 2005)	Labor-Meimad
Minister of Internal Security	Tzachi Hanegbi (until 6 September 2004)	Likud
Minister of Internal Security	Gideon Ezra (from 29 November 2004)	Likud, Kadima
Minister of Jerusalem Affairs	Natan Sharansky (3 March 2003 - 4 May 2005)	Not an MK ^{1}
Minister of Justice	Tommy Lapid (until 4 December 2004)	Shinui
Minister of Justice	Tzipi Livni (from 10 January 2005)	Likud, Kadima
Minister of National Infrastructure	Yosef Paritzky (until 13 July 2004)	Shinui
Minister of National Infrastructure	Eliezer Sandberg (19 July - 4 December 2004)	Shinui
Minister of National Infrastructure	Binyamin Ben-Eliezer (10 January - 23 November 2005)	Labor-Meimad
Minister of National Infrastructure	Roni Bar-On (from 18 January 2006)	Kadima
Minister of Religious Affairs	Ariel Sharon (until 31 December 2003)	Likud
Minister of Science, Culture and Sport	Eliezer Sandberg (until 19 July 2004)	Shinui
Minister of Science, Culture and Sport	Ilan Shalgi (24 July - 29 November 2004)	Shinui
Minister of Science, Culture and Sport	Victor Brailovsky (29 November - 4 December 2004)	Shinui
Minister of Science, Culture and Sport	Matan Vilnai (7–23 November 2005)	Labor-Meimad
Minister of Science, Culture and Sport	Roni Bar-On (from 18 January 2006)	Kadima
Minister of Tourism	Benny Elon (until 6 June 2004)	National Union
Minister of Tourism	Gideon Ezra (31 August 2004 - 10 January 2005)	Likud
Minister of Tourism	Avraham Hirschson (from 10 January 2005)	Likud, Kadima
Minister of Transportation	Avigdor Lieberman (until 6 June 2004)	National Union
Minister of Transportation	Meir Sheetrit (from 31 August 2004)	Likud, Kadima
Minister of Welfare and Social Services	Zevulun Orlev (3 March 2003 - 11 November 2004)	National Religious Party
Minister in the Prime Minister's Office	Gideon Ezra (until 31 August 2004)	Likud
Minister in the Prime Minister's Office	Uzi Landau (until 26 October 2004)	Likud
Minister in the Prime Minister's Office	Tzachi Hanegbi (from 6 September 2004)	Likud, Kadima
Minister in the Prime Minister's Office	Matan Vilnai (12 January - 28 August 2005)	Labor-Meimad
Minister without Portfolio	Haim Ramon (10 January - 23 November 2005)	Labor-Meimad

^{1} Although Sharansky was not an MK at the time of his appointment, he had been elected to the Knesset on the Yisrael BaAliyah list.
