= Knesset Committee on Education, Culture and Sports =

The Knesset Committee on Education, Culture and Sport (Hebrew: ועדת החינוך, התרבות והספורט, Vaadat hinuh ha, ha-Tarbut ve-ha-sport) is a Knesset committee which deals with education, culture, sports and arts in Israel.

The committee was established in 1949, during the tenure of the 1st Knesset convocation.

As a commission for education, the committee deals with all matters related to education: regarding schools, kindergartens, education in specific sectors, private education, teaching materials, the teachers, development and investment in various areas, the education budget, financial support for poor students, the education of students with learning disabilities and the higher education in Israel. The committee also discusses the treatment of various current trends and behaviors among Israeli teens which are widely perceived as negative and how to prevent them.

As a commission for Culture, Sport and Arts, the committee deals with promoting the culture in Israel in three different languages: Hebrew, Arabic and Yiddish.

The committee also deals with all matters related to the various branches of sports in Israel, especially the most popular ones: soccer, basketball, volleyball and swimming.

== Chairs of the Commission ==
Portrait	Chairman	Took office	Left office	Party	Ref.
Shoshana Parsitz	Shoshana Parsitz	1949	1959	General Zionists	
Elimelekh Rimalt	Elimelekh Rimalt	1959	1961	Liberal	
Moshe Kol	Moshe Kol	1961	1965	Independent Liberals	
Elimelekh Rimalt	Elimelekh Rimalt	1965	1969	Gahal	
Avraham Katz	Avraham Katz	1969	1970	Gahal	
Elimelekh Rimalt	Elimelekh Rimalt	1970	1974	Gahal	
Avraham Shekhterman	Avraham Shekhterman	1974	1975	Likud	
Avraham Katz	Avraham Katz	1975	1977	Likud	
Aharon Yadlin	Aharon Yadlin	1977	1979	Alignment	
Ora Namir	Ora Namir	1979	1984	Alignment	
Nachman Raz	Nachman Raz	1984	1988	Alignment	
Michael Bar-Zohar	Michael Bar-Zohar	1989	1992	Labor	
Avraham Burg	Avraham Burg	1992	1995	Labor	
Dalia Itzik	Dalia Itzik	1995	1996	Labor	
Emanuel Zisman	Emanuel Zisman	1996	1999	Third Way	
Zevulun Orlev	Zevulun Orlev	1999	2003	Mafdal	
Ilan Shalgi	Ilan Shalgi	2003	2004	Shinui	
Meli Polishook-Bloch	Meli Polishook-Bloch	2004	2005	Shinui	
Avraham Poraz	Avraham Poraz	2005	2006	Shinui	
Michael Melchior	Michael Melchior	2006	2009	Meimad	
Zevulun Orlev	Zevulun Orlev	2009	2010	Jewish Home	
Alex Miller	Alex Miller	2010	2012	Yisrael Beiteinu	
Einat Wilf	Einat Wilf	2012	2013	Independence	
Amram Mitzna	Amram Mitzna	2013	2015	Hatnua	
Ya'akov Margi	Ya'akov Margi	2015	2019	Shas	
Nitzan Horowitz	Nitzan Horowitz	2020	2020	Meretz	
Ram Shefa	Ram Shefa	2020	2021	Blue and White	
Sharren Haskel	Sharren Haskel (born 1984)	2021	2022	New Hope	
Yosef Taieb	Yosef Taieb (born 1981)	2023	2025	Shas	
Zvi Sukkot	Zvi Sukkot (born 1990)	2025		Religious Zionist	
