= Shadow Cabinet of Tommy Lapid =

Israeli government cabinet

Lapid Shadow Cabinet
- Shadow Cabinet of Israel
- 2005 – 2006
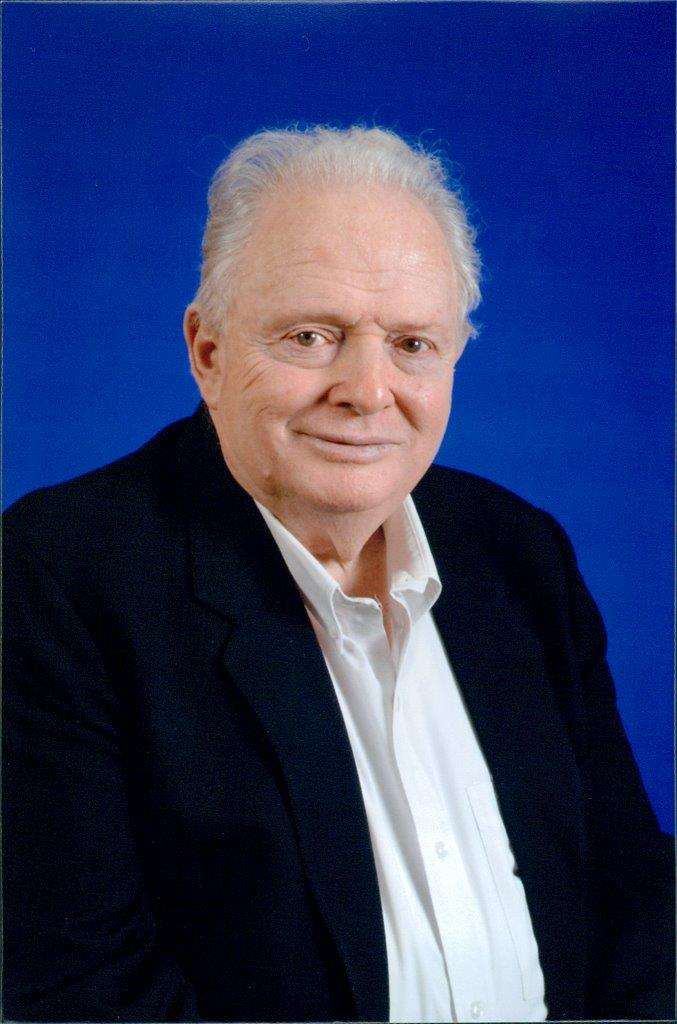
- Date formed: 3 January 2005

People and organisations
- President: Moshe Katzav
- Shadow Prime Minister: Tommy Lapid
- Shadow Acting Prime Minister: Avraham Poraz
- Prime Minister being shadowed: Ariel Sharon (30th Government)
- Member party: Shinui
- Status in legislature: Opposition 15 / 120 (13%)

History
- Outgoing election: 2006 Israeli legislative election
- Legislature term: 16th Knesset

The Shadow Cabinet of Tommy Lapid was created on 3 January 2005 following Shinui's withdrawal from the government in December 2004. Although the idea was considered before, especially in the 1980s when Likud and the Israeli Labor Party formed large blocs in the Knesset, this was the first time a Shadow Cabinet was formed in Israel.

== Shadow cabinet list ==
Portfolio	Shadow Minister	Party
Shadow Prime Minister	Tommy Lapid	Shinui
Shadow Vice Prime Minister	Tommy Lapid	Shinui
Shadow Acting Prime Minister	Avraham Poraz	Shinui
Shadow Minister of Agriculture	Reshef Hen	Shinui
Shadow Minister of Communications	Avraham Poraz	Shinui
Shadow Minister of Defense	Ilan Shalgi	Shinui
Shadow Minister of Education, Culture and Sport	Meli Polishook-Bloch	Shinui
Shadow Minister of the Environment	Ilan Shalgi	Shinui
Shadow Minister of Finance	Avraham Poraz	Shinui
Shadow Minister of Foreign Affairs	Eliezer Sandberg	Shinui
Shadow Minister of Health	Ehud Rassabi	Shinui
Shadow Minister of Housing and Construction	Ilan Leibovitch	Shinui
Shadow Minister of Immigrant Absorption	Victor Brailovsky	Shinui
Shadow Minister of Industry, Trade and Labour	Ilan Leibovitch	Shinui
Shadow Minister of Internal Affairs	Roni Brizon	Shinui
Shadow Minister of Internal Security	not appointed	
Shadow Minister of Justice	Eti Livni	Shinui
Shadow Minister of National Infrastructure	Hemi Doron	Shinui
Shadow Minister of Religious Affairs	Roni Brizon	Shinui
Shadow Minister of Science and Technology	Meli Polishook-Bloch	Shinui
Shadow Minister of Tourism	Erela Golan	Shinui
Shadow Minister of Transportation	Ilan Leibovitch	Shinui
Shadow Minister of Welfare and Social Services	Yigal Yasinov	Shinui

== Personnel differences ==
The following members of the shadow cabinet were ex-ministers in the Sharon government on the day of Shinui's withdrawal:

- Tommy Lapid, who held the Justice portfolio in the Sharon government, held no shadow portfolio apart from that of Prime Minister (shadowing Sharon) and Vice Prime Minister (shadowing Shimon Peres).
- Avraham Poraz, who held the Interior portfolio in the Sharon government, was moved to shadow the communications and finance portfolios.
- Ilan Shalgi, who held the environmental protection portfolio in the Sharon government, retained it in the shadow cabinet, also gaining the defense portfolio.
- Eliezer Sandberg, who held the national infrastructure portfolio in the Sharon government, was moved to shadow the foreign affairs portfolio.
- Victor Brailovsky, who held the culture portfolio in the Sharon government, was moved to shadow the immigrant absorption portfolio.
