= Reshef Hen =

Israeli politician

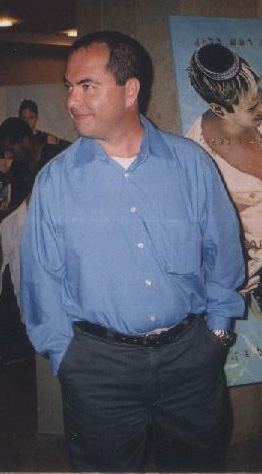

Faction represented in the Knesset
- 2003–2006: Shinui
- 2006: Secular Faction

Other roles
- 2005: Shadow Minister of Agriculture

Personal details
- Born: 28 May 1968 (age 57) Haifa, Israel

Reshef Ari Hen (Hebrew: רשף חן; born 28 May 1968) is an Israeli lawyer and former politician who served as a member of the Knesset for Shinui and the Secular Faction between 2003 and 2006.

== Biography ==
Born in Haifa, Hen gained an LLB at the University of Essex and an MBA at the University of Haifa before working as an attorney.

Between 1998 and 2003 he served on Haifa city council. For the 2003 Knesset elections he was placed ninth on the Shinui list, and entered the Knesset when the party won 15 seats. During his first term, he was chair of the Shinui faction, a member of the House Committee, the Committee on Drug Abuse, the Constitution, Law and Justice Committee and the Committee on the Status of Women. He was also a member of the parliamentary inquiries into trafficking of women and corruption in the government.

Along with most of the party's MKs, he defected to the Secular Faction (which later became Hetz) shortly before the 2006 elections following disagreements over the results of Shinui's primary results. He was placed 60th on the Hetz list for the elections, and lost his seat when it failed to cross the electoral threshold.
