= Victor Brailovsky =

Israeli mathematician and politician (born 1935)

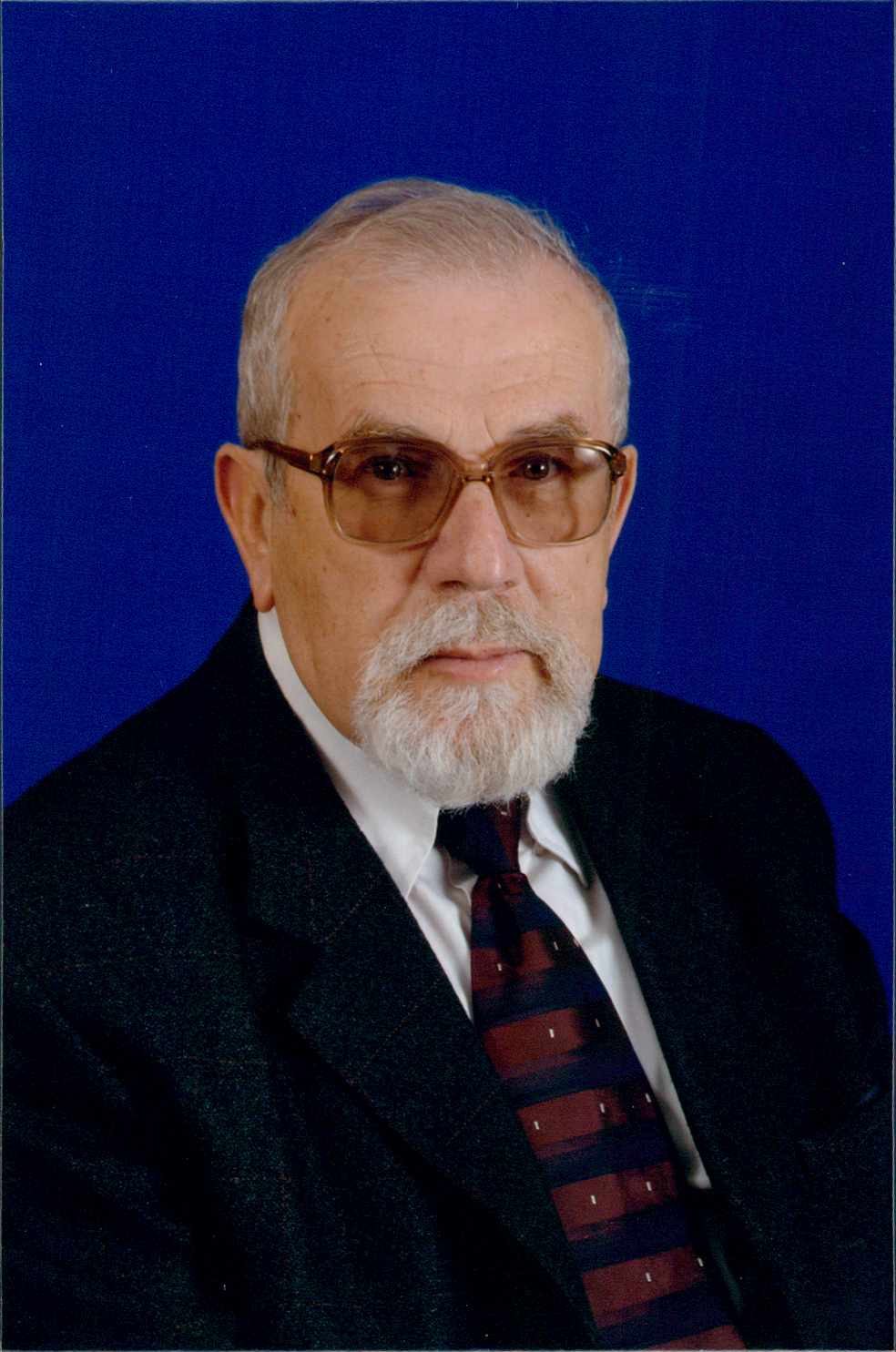
- Brailovsky during his time in the Knesset

Ministerial roles
- 2004: Minister of Science & Technology

Faction represented in the Knesset
- 1999-2006: Shinui
- 2006: Secular Faction

Other roles
- 2005: Shadow Minister of Immigrant Absorption

Personal details
- Born: 27 December 1935 (age 90) Moscow, Soviet Union

Dr Victor Brailovsky (Hebrew: ויקטור בריילובסקי; born 27 December 1935) is an Israeli computer scientist, mathematician, aliyah activist and former politician. He served as Minister of Science and Technology for six days in 2004. In May 1986 Brailovsky was awarded an Honorary Doctorate Degree from the Open University in England.

== Biography ==
Brailovsky was born in Moscow in 1935. He was an activist for aliyah and refusenik between 1972 and 1987, and was a Prisoner of Zion between 1981 and 1984. In 1987 he was allowed to emigrate to Israel with his family, where he worked as a professor of mathematics and computer science in Tel-Aviv University.

In the 1999 elections he was voted into the Knesset on Shinui's list, and became a member of the Science and Technology and Immigration, Absorption, and Diaspora Affairs committees.

Following the 2003 elections, in which Brailovsky retained his seat, Shinui joined Ariel Sharon's government. On 5 March 2003 he was appointed Deputy Minister of Internal Affairs. On 29 November 2004 he became Minister of Science and Technology, replacing fellow Shinui member Ilan Shalgi. However, Shinui pulled out of the government less than a week later, and Brailovsky lost his cabinet post.

Following the split in Shinui, Brailovsky joined the Secular Faction (later Hetz). The party failed to cross the electoral threshold in the 2006 elections and he lost his seat.
