= Shlomo Shoham =

Israeli judge

- שלמה שהם
- Born: 1949 (age 76–77)
- Occupation: Judge

Shlomo Shoham (Hebrew: שלמה שהם; born in 1949) is a retired judge, served as the Chairman of the Israeli Parole Committee and the Deputy National Commissioner for the Parole Committees, served as the only Commissioner for Future Generations, an office established by the late Israeli Justice Minister Tommy Lapid father of Yair Lapid, in the years 2002-2006. Global Vice President of NIFG the super organization of Commissions for Future Generations. Serves as the head of the SGLA program, the program for training future leaders and a board member of the World Intellectual Forum.

== Biography ==
Born in Haifa, studied law at Bar-Ilan University. He owned a law firm in Tel Aviv, and in 1983 was appointed as a judge of the Ashdod Magistrate's Court. In 1995 he retired from his judicial position and was appointed as a legal advisor to the Constitution, Law and Constitution Committee of the Knesset.

In 2001, he was elected by a public committee to serve as Commissioner for Future Generations in the Knesset. He held the position in the years 2002-2006, after which no commissioner was appointed in his place.

He served as a law lecturer at Bar-Ilan University, the Hebrew University of Jerusalem and Tel Aviv University. He served as an honorary fellow of the Bertelsmann Foundation in Germany. He taught future-oriented educational leadership in colleges of education, and currently teaches at Ohalo College in Katzerin. Author of the book "Future Intelligence" which deals with thinking about the future and creating a desirable future. Conducts workshops and courses around the world and in Israel as a facilitator in training courses for mentors, to train facilitators for dynamic meditation. Creates a "melody" meditation - mind, body and soul. In a 2014 September article for Ynet, it is stated that Shoham is greatly influenced by the teachings of Osho.

In 2010, he was awarded the "Promoter of the Future" award as part of the first annual conference for future science, held at Bar-Ilan University.

== Books ==
- Shoham, Shlomo (1 September 2010). Future Intelligence. Verlag Bertelsmann Stiftung. ISBN 978-3867930444.
