= Ilan Leibovitch =

Israeli politician

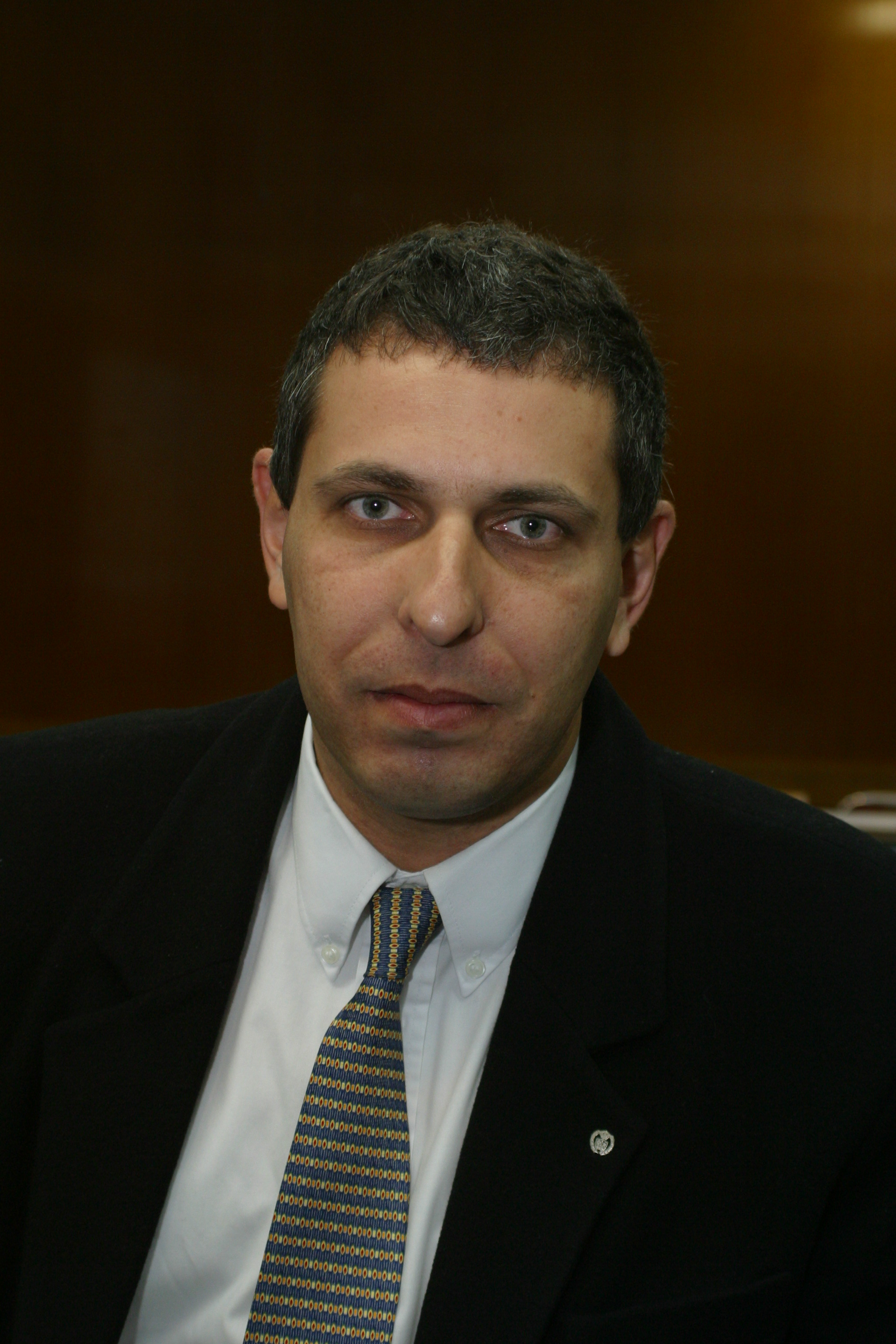
- Leibovitch in 2003

Faction represented in the Knesset
- 2003–2006: Shinui

Other roles
- 2005: Shadow Minister of Housing & Construction
- 2005: Shadow Minister of Industry, Trade & Labor
- 2005: Shadow Minister of Transportation

Personal details
- Born: 25 January 1967 (age 59) Rehovot, Israel

Ilan Leibovitch (Hebrew: אילן ליבוביץ; born 25 January 1967) is an Israeli former politician who served as a member of the Knesset for Shinui between 2003 and 2006.

== Biography ==
Born in Rehovot, Leibovitch gained a BA in international relations and political science at the Hebrew University of Jerusalem and a law degree from the College of Management.

For the 2003 elections he was placed 13th on Shinui's list, and entered the Knesset when the party won 15 seats. During his first term, he was a member of the Foreign Affairs and Defense Committee, the Committee on the Status of Women, the Committee on Foreign Workers, the Committee on Drug Abuse, the Committee on Foreign Workers, the Economic Affairs Committee and the State Control Committee.

Following a split in the party in January 2006, Leibovitch and Ehud Rassabi were left as the only two sitting MKs in Shinui. He was placed third on the party's list for the 2006 elections, but lost his seat when the party failed to cross the electoral threshold.
