= Ministry of Science, Technology and Space =

Government ministry of Israel

- משרד החדשנות, המדע והטכנולוגיה
- Emblem of Israel

Agency overview
- Formed: 1982
- Jurisdiction: Government of Israel
- Minister responsible: Gila Gamliel
- Website: www.most.gov.il

The Ministry of Science and Technology is a government ministry in Israel, headed by the Science and Technology Minister. The portfolio has been renamed several times since its creation, and has previously included Culture and Sport, which is now the responsibility of the Culture and Sport Ministry. In April 2013, the Ministry added "Space" to its name to promote space research and technology.

The ministry is responsible for defining national policy on issues related to Science and technology in Israel, and promoting scientific and technological research, infrastructure and projects. In addition, under its jurisdiction, it acts to develop human capital, increase the social and economic vigor of Israeli society, and maintain equal opportunity in all areas of science and technology. Amongst its goals, the Ministry constitutes a connecting link between basic research, applied research and industrial development. Another central goal of the Ministry is to strengthen as well as initiate international scientific collaborations with other countries and international organization.

== List of ministers ==
#	Minister	Party	Government	Term start	Term end	Notes
Minister of Science and Development
1	Yuval Ne'eman	Tehiya	19	26 July 1982	10 October 1983	
Minister of Science and Technology
–	Yuval Ne'eman	Tehiya	20	10 October 1983	13 September 1984	
Minister of Science and Development
2	Gideon Patt	Likud	21, 22	13 September 1984	22 December 1988	
Minister of Science and Technology
3	Ezer Weizman	Alignment	23	22 December 1988	15 March 1990	
–	Yuval Ne'eman	Likud	24	11 June 1990	21 January 1992	
4	Amnon Rubinstein	Meretz	25	13 July 1992	31 December 1992	
5	Shimon Shetreet	Labor Party	25	13 July 1992	7 June 1993	
Minister of Science and the Arts
6	Shulamit Aloni	Meretz	26, 26	7 June 1993	18 June 1996	
Minister of Science
7	Ze'ev Binyamin Begin	Likud	27	18 June 1996	16 January 1997	
8	Benjamin Butcheryahu	Likud	27	18 June 1996	9 July 1997	Serving Prime Minister
Minister of Science and Technology
9	Michael Eitan	Likud	27	9 July 1997	13 July 1998	
10	Silvan Shalom	Likud	27	13 July 1998	6 July 1999	
Minister of Science
11	Ehud Barak	One Israel	28	6 July 1999	5 August 1999	Serving Prime Minister
Minister of Science, Culture and Sport
12	Matan Vilnai	One Israel; Labor Party	28, 29	5 August 1999	2 November 2002	
Minister of Science and Technology
13	Eliezer Sandberg	Shinui	30	28 February 2003	19 July 2004	
14	Ilan Shalgi	Shinui	30	24 July 2004	29 November 2004	
15	Victor Brailovsky	Shinui	30	29 November 2004	4 December 2004	
–	Matan Vilnai	Labor Party	30	28 August 2005	23 November 2005	Initially Acting, appointed permanently on 7 November
16	Roni Bar-On	Kadima	30	18 January 2006	4 May 2006	
Minister of Science, Culture and Sport
17	Ophir Pines-Paz	Labor Party	31	4 May 2006	1 November 2006	
18	Yuli Tamir	Labor Party	31	5 November 2006	21 March 2007	Acting Minister
19	Raleb Majadele	Labor Party	31	21 March 2007	31 March 2009	
Minister of Science and Technology
20	Daniel Hershkowitz	The Jewish Home	32	31 March 2009	18 March 2013	
Minister of Science, Technology and Space
21	Yaakov Peri	Yesh Atid	33	18 March 2013	4 December 2014	
22	Danny Danon	Likud	34	14 May 2015	27 August 2015	
23	Ofir Akunis	Likud	34	27 August 2015	17 May 2020	
24	Yizhar Shai	Blue and White	35	17 May 2020	12 January 2021	
25	Orit Farkash-Hacohen	Blue and White	36	13 June 2021	29 December 2022	
26	Ofir Akunis	Likud	37	29 December 2022	18 March 2024	
27	Gila Gamliel	Likud	37	18 March 2024		

=== Deputy ministers ===
#	Minister	Party	Government	Term start	Term end
1	Geula Cohen	Tehiya	24	25 June 1990	31 October 1991
2	Tzipi Hotovely	Likud	33	29 December 2014	14 May 2015

== See also ==
- Science and technology in Israel
