= Ehud Rassabi =

Israeli politician

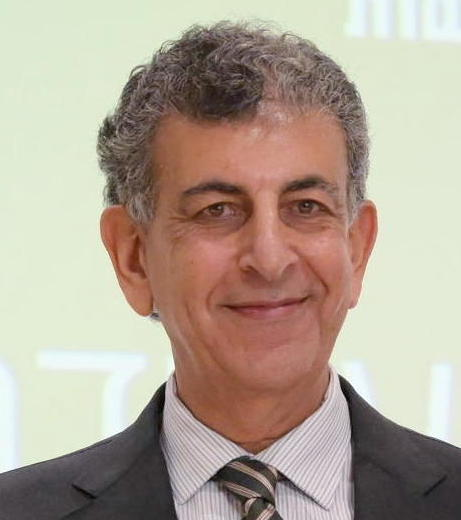
- Rassabi in 2022

Faction represented in the Knesset
- 2003–2006: Shinui

Other roles
- 2005: Shadow Minister of Health

Personal details
- Born: 30 July 1953 (age 73) Tel Aviv, Israel

Ehud Rassabi (Hebrew: אהוד רצאבי; born 30 July 1953) is an Israeli former politician who served as a member of the Knesset for Shinui between 2003 and 2006.

== Biography ==
Born in Tel Aviv, Rassabi gained Accountant Certification from Tel Aviv University, and worked in accountancy.

He joined Shinui in 1985, and for the 1999 elections was placed eighth on the Shinui list, but missed out on a seat when they won only six mandates. For the 2003 elections he was placed 11th on the party's list, and entered the Knesset when the party won 15 seats. During his first term, he chaired the Subcommittee for Taxes and Hi-Tech.

Following a split in the party in January 2006, Rassabi and Ilan Leibovitch were left as the only two sitting MKs in Shinui. He was placed second on the party's list for the 2006 elections, but lost his seat when the party failed to cross the electoral threshold.

== Honours ==
- Order of the Rising Sun, 3rd Class, Gold Rays with Neck Ribbon (2018)
