= Operation Determined Path =

Israeli army operation which was carried in 2002 in the West Bank

Operation "Determined Path" (Hebrew: מבצע דרך נחושה, romanized: Mivtza Derekh Nehosha) was a military operation carried out by the Israel Defense Forces, starting June 22, 2002, following Operation "Defensive Shield", with the goal of reaching some of the unreached objectives set forth for Defensive Shield, especially in the northern West Bank.

== Background ==
In the two months following "Defensive Shield", five IDF officers and soldiers were killed in activity in the Palestinian territories, mostly in attempts to arrest wanted persons. The regular units which participated in "Defensive Shield" were not rested. Israel suffered 64 major attacks which claimed the lives of 83 civilians. June 18 saw the Patt junction bus bombing in Jerusalem, in which nineteen people were killed. Israeli Prime Minister, Ariel Sharon, visited the location, for the first time as PM. That day, he ordered "Determined Path". According to a poll, 80% of Jewish Israelis supported it.

== Operation ==
The IDF issued emergency drafts, although with a specified release date, unlike the ones issued before "Defensive Shield". Israeli intelligence argued that a few top Hamas operatives in the Gaza Strip slipped through Israeli security to the West Bank and had begun to produce explosives there. The effort was aimed mostly at Hamas and Palestinian Islamic Jihad cells.

In the first phase, heavy forces entered the West Bank towns and took up positions. The IDF put a curfew and arrested wanted persons. After a few weeks, the fixed positions were abandoned (except in Nablus), but the units kept entering almost nightly to make arrests. On July 7, Israeli Defense Minister, Benjamin Ben-Eliezer, said that in the course of "Determined Path", 150 wanted persons were arrested, including ten potential suicide bombers, and fourteen explosive labs were exposed. After two weeks, the IDF called it a "great success", citing the decline in Palestinian attacks and the absence of Israeli casualties. The third week of the operation saw two Palestinian attacks, one in Immanuel and one Tel Aviv.

== Aftermath ==
A month after the start of the operation, a one senior IDF officer in the territories said he felt that for the time being, it was "delivering the goods". The two attacks were cited as exceptions to the rule which prove it. In Jenin, tanks and armored personnel carriers on patrol were often replaced by one or two jeeps. Colonel Moshe Tamir, commander of the Golani Brigade, became commander of the Jenin district. His troops were deployed outside the city, mostly on the seam line. They went in and out of the city according to need, mostly for specific arrests. In Hebron, 180 Palestinian suspects were arrested during the operation.
