= Roni Brizon =

Israeli politician

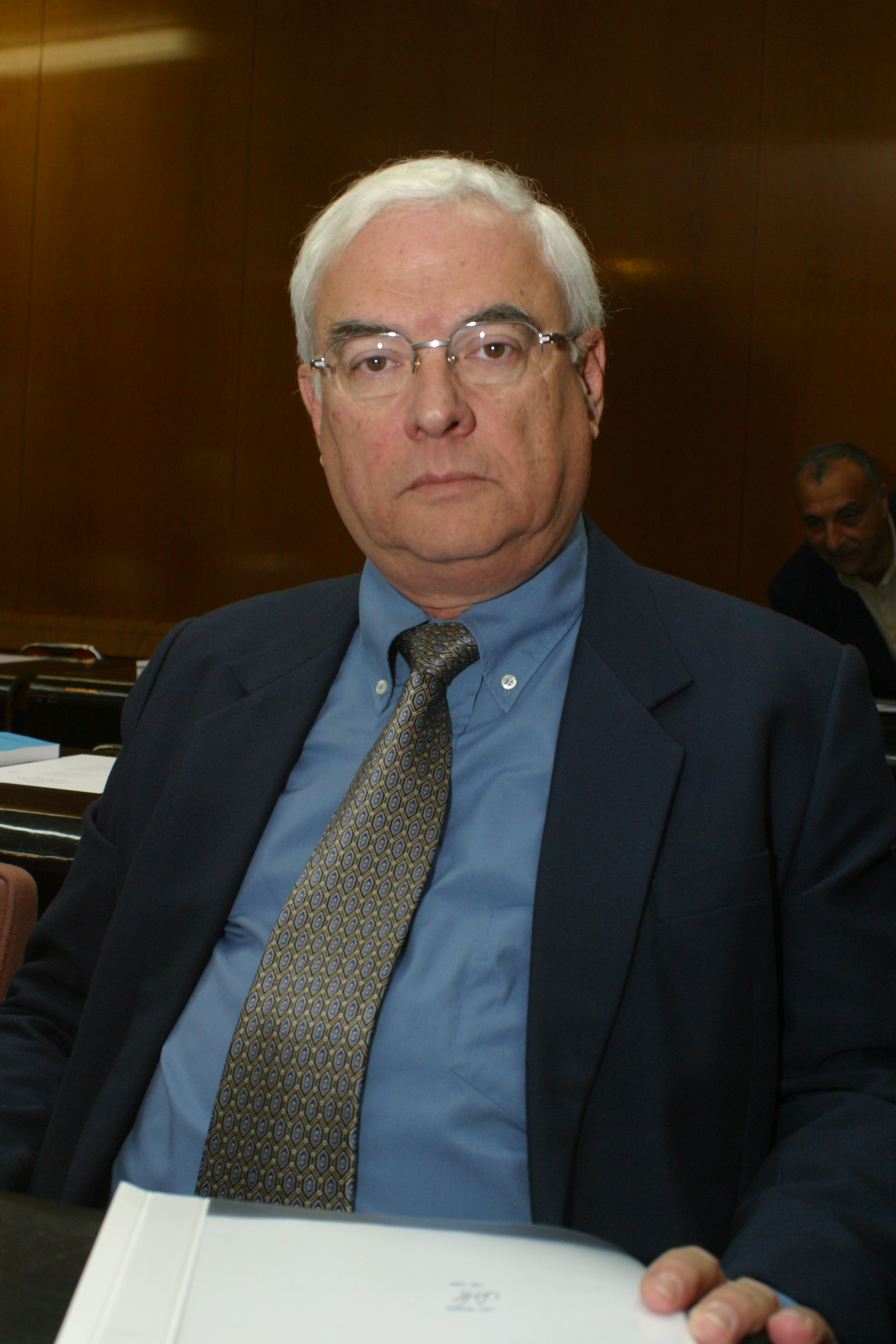
- Brizon in 2003

Faction represented in the Knesset
- 2003–2006: Shinui
- 2006: Secular Faction

Other roles
- 2005: Shadow Minister of Internal Affairs
- 2005: Shadow Minister of Religious Affairs

Personal details
- Born: 16 October 1944 (age 81) Tel Aviv, Mandatory Palestine

Aharon "Roni" Brizon (Hebrew: אהרן "רוני" בריזון; born 16 October 1944) is an Israeli former politician who served as a member of the Knesset for Shinui and the Secular Faction between 2003 and 2006.

== Biography ==
Born in Tel Aviv, Brizon gained a BA in political science from the Hebrew University of Jerusalem and a BA in philosophy from Tel Aviv University. in 1999, Brizon joined the Shinui party, and began to write in Tel Aviv's local press under the pen name "Inj Kadid Leper"

For the 2003 elections he was placed tenth on the Shinui list, and entered the Knesset when the party won 15 seats. During his first term he was a member of the House Committee, the Internal Affairs and Environment Committee, the Finance Committee and the Committee on Foreign Workers. Along with most of the party's MKs, he defected to the Secular Faction (which later became Hetz) shortly before the 2006 elections following disagreements over the results of Shinui's primary results. He was placed second on the Hetz list for the elections, but lost his seat when the party failed to cross the electoral threshold.

On March 25, 2007, Brizon became Israel's Trade Commissioner within the Israeli Delegation to the European Union.

Brizon later joined Hatnuah, and was placed twentieth on its list for the 2013 elections. However, the party won only six seats.
