= Daniel Benlulu =

Israeli politician

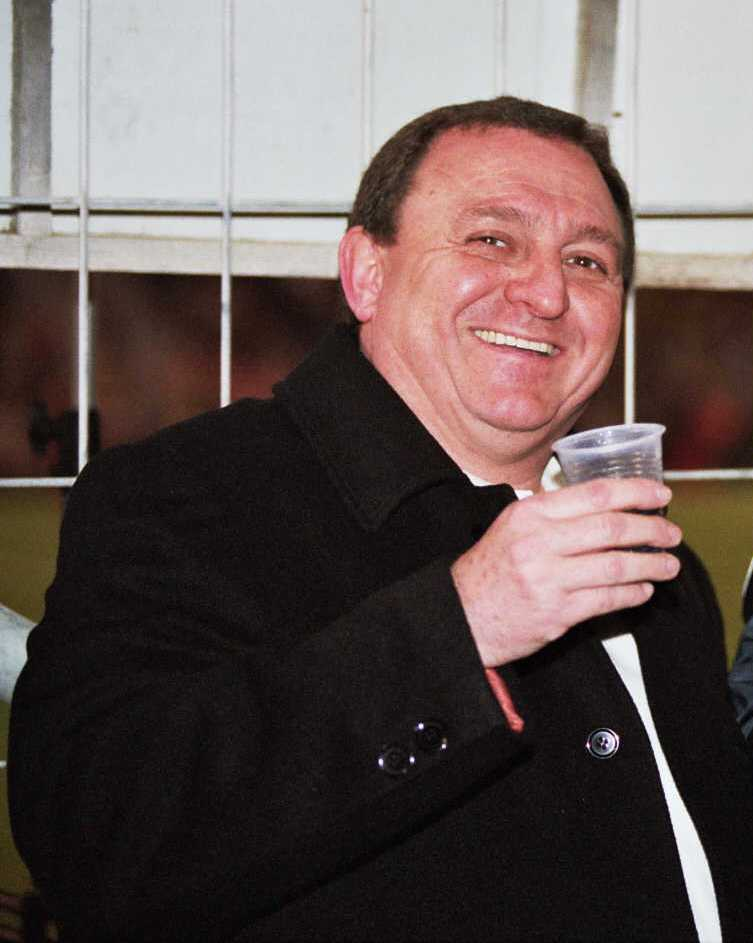
- Benlulu in 2012

Faction represented in the Knesset
- 2003–2006: Likud

Personal details
- Born: 6 May 1958 (age 68) Morocco

Daniel Benlulu (Hebrew: דניאל בנלולו; born 6 May 1958) is an Israeli former politician who served a member of the Knesset for Likud between 2003 and 2006.

== Biography ==
Born in Morocco to Moroccan-Jewish parents, Benlulu emigrated to Israel in 1969.

In late 2002 he won 20th place on the Likud list for the January 2003 elections (a spot reserved for candidates from the coastal plain), and entered the Knesset when the party won 38 seats. During his first term as an MK, he chaired the House Committee and the Joint Committee for the Knesset Budget.

For the 2006 elections he was placed 16th on the Likud list, but lost his seat when the party won only 12 seats.
