= Tommy Lapid =

Israeli journalist and politician (1931–2008)

- טומי לפיד
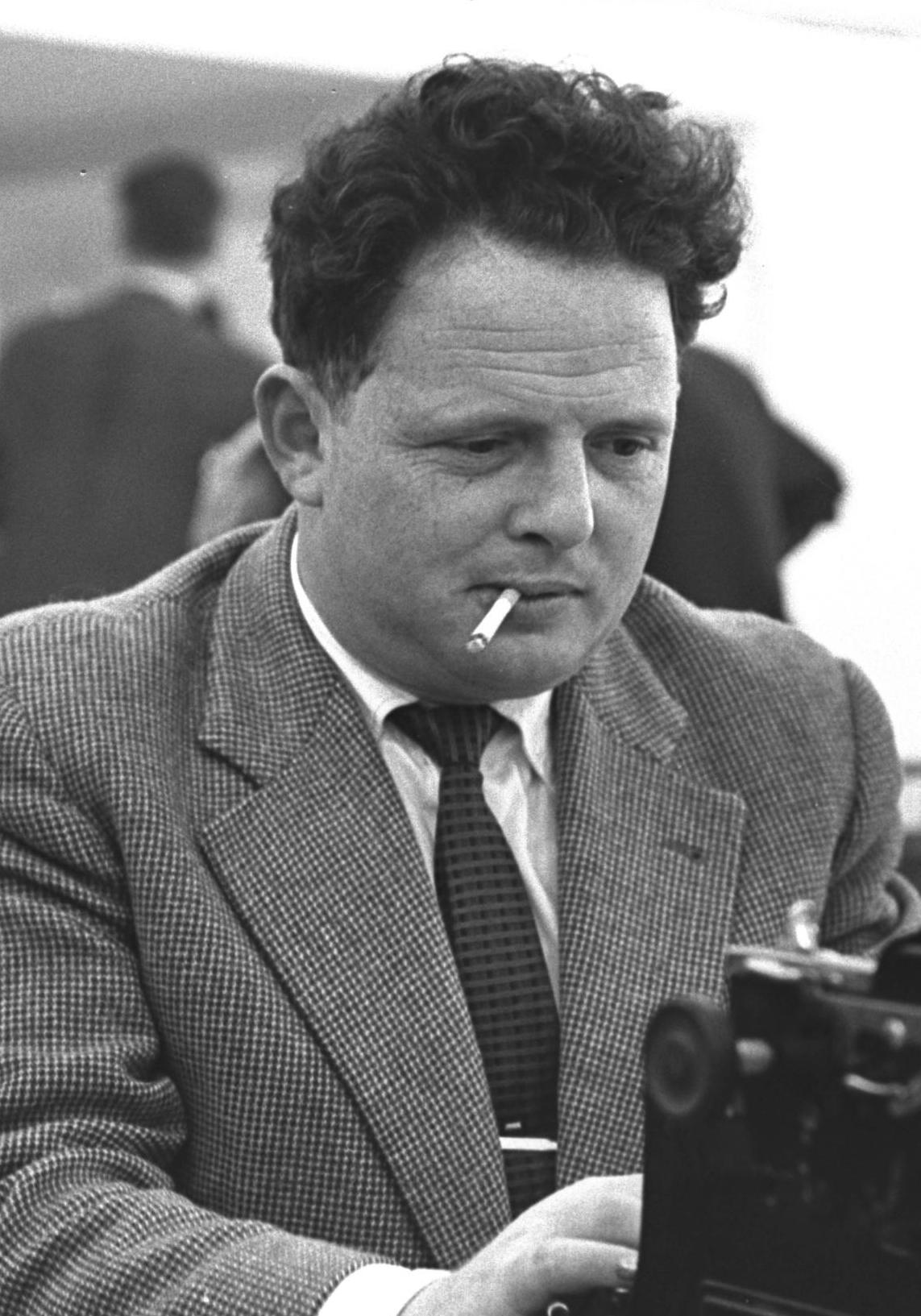
- Lapid reporting from the Eichmann trial in 1961

Leader of the Opposition
- In office 10 January 2005 – 23 November 2005
- Prime Minister: Ariel Sharon
- Preceded by: Shimon Peres
- Succeeded by: Amir Peretz

Ministerial roles
- 2003–2004: Deputy Prime Minister
- 2003–2004: Minister of Justice

Faction represented in the Knesset
- 1999–2006: Shinui
- 2006: Secular Faction

Other roles
- 2005: Shadow Prime Minister
- 2005: Shadow Vice Prime Minister

Personal details
- Born: Tomislav Lampel; 27 December 1931 Novi Sad, Yugoslavia
- Died: 1 June 2008 (aged 76) Tel Aviv, Israel
- Spouse: Shulamit Giladi (m. 1959)
- Children: 3, including Yair

Joseph "Tommy" Lapid (Hebrew: יוסף "טומי" לפיד; born Tomislav Lampel [Serbian Cyrillic: Томислав Лампел]; 27 December 1931 – 1 June 2008) was a Yugoslav-born Israeli radio and television presenter, playwright, journalist, politician and government minister known for his sharp tongue and acerbic wit. Lapid headed the secular-liberal Shinui party from 1999 to 2006. He fiercely opposed the ultra-Orthodox political parties and actively sought to exclude any religious observance from the legal structure of the Israeli state. He was the father of Yair Lapid, who served as the 14th Prime Minister of Israel in 2022.

== Biography ==
Lapid was born in Novi Sad, Kingdom of Yugoslavia (modern-day Serbia), to a family of Hungarian Jewish descent. His family was seized by the Nazis and deported to the Budapest Ghetto. His father, Dr. Béla (Meir) Lampel, a lawyer and Zionist leader, was deported to Mauthausen concentration camp, where he was murdered. His grandmother Hermina was murdered in Auschwitz. Lapid and his mother were rescued by Raoul Wallenberg in Budapest. They survived the war and moved to Israel in 1948 where he worked at the Hungarian-language Israeli paper Új Kelet with Rudolf Kasztner. After serving as a radio operator in the Israel Defense Forces between 1950 and 1953, Lapid graduated with a law degree from Tel Aviv University in 1957. He married Shulamit Giladi, an acclaimed novelist; they had three children. Their son, Yair Lapid, is the chairman of the political party Yesh Atid, which became the second-biggest party in the 2013 Israeli elections, and was a columnist and television host. Yair became Prime Minister of Israel on 1 July 2022. Tommy and Shulamit's youngest daughter, Merav, is a clinical psychologist. Their elder daughter, Michal, was killed in a car accident in 1984.

== Media career ==
Lapid started out as a journalist for the Israeli Hungarian-language newspaper Új Kelet. Later, he was hired by the mainstream daily Maariv, where he became an influential publicist, and went on to become director-general of the Israel Broadcasting Authority and chairman of the Cable TV Union. He was also the founding editor of Israeli women's magazine At, as well as a successful playwright.

In the 1990s Lapid was a regular guest on the political talk show Popolitika aired on Channel 1 which often turned into a shouting match; later on he moved to the Channel 2 talk show, Politika.

In October 1994, on a Canada AM TV show interview with ex-Mossad agent Victor Ostrovsky, journalist Valerie Pringle spoke by phone with Lapid regarding recent inflammatory comments he had made on Popolitika regarding Ostrovsky and his latest book, "The Other Side of Deception." Lapid reiterated his earlier comments that he felt Ostrovsky was a traitor to Israel and hoped that "there will be a decent Jew in Canada who can assassinate him for us."

Lapid was awarded the Sokolov Award, Israel's top award in journalism, in 1998, for his weekly radio show.

== Political career ==
In the late 1990s, Lapid joined Avraham Poraz's Shinui party, which boosted the party's standing in the Israeli political scene. Lapid became party chairman and Shinui won six seats in the 1999 elections, with Lapid entering the Knesset for the first time. In the 2003 elections the party ran on a secularist platform and won 15 seats, making it the third-largest in the Knesset after Likud and Labour. Shinui was invited to join the government of Ariel Sharon and Lapid was appointed Deputy Prime Minister and Minister of Justice.

It was suggested that Israel's pro-Serbian position in 1999, was a result of the Serbian population's history of saving Jews during the Holocaust, personal memories of which were still present among older Israeli politicians, such as Lapid, serving in government at the time.

Between 2001 and 2006, Lapid, via a bill passed by the Knesset, established the commission of "Future Generations", headed by retired judge Shlomo Shoham, an office that was later closed down by a bill passed by then Knesset member and Chairman of the Knesset Committee, Yariv Levin, on the grounds that the commission was a "big malfunction" in which "a commissioner sits above us while we're the elected officials. Apparently, this commissioner was granted the 'prophecy' that he knows what is best for future generations." In a rebuttal, Shoham stated that "the Chairman of the Knesset Committee does not understand the essence of the position of "Commissioner of Future Generations" within the checks and balances of democracy."

The tension between Shinui and Likud grew when the ultra-Orthodox party Agudat Yisrael was brought into the coalition. Shinui could not implement many of its electoral promises, such as instituting civil marriage, and a dispute erupted over state aid to religious institutions. As a result, Shinui quit the coalition in December 2004. Lapid announced the formation of a Shadow Cabinet based on the British model on 3 January 2005, before being appointed Leader of the Opposition a week later. In late March 2005, Lapid voted in favor of the budget in exchange for minor concessions in order to keep the government from falling, which was liable to lead to early elections and impede the implementation of the disengagement plan.

In Shinui's primary elections held shortly before the 2006 elections, Lapid retained the party leadership. However, his deputy Poraz lost second place on the list. In the ensuing crisis, Poraz and several other Shinui MKs left the party and founded Hetz. Lapid left Shinui two weeks after the vote and announced his support for Poraz's new party, but chose not to be involved in the new party's leadership, instead of serving as a figurehead. In the elections, he was allocated the symbolic 120th place on the Hetz list, but the party failed to win a seat.

== Non-political activities ==
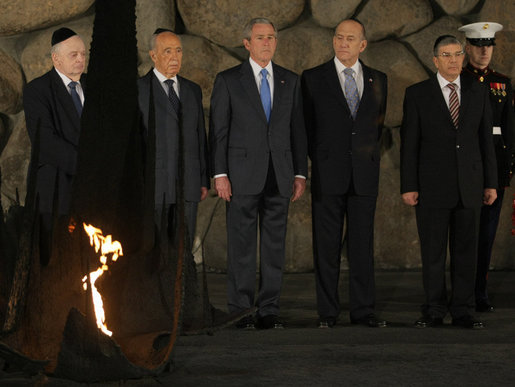
Tommy Lapid (far-left) at Yad Vashem during George W. Bush's visit, 2008

In July 2006, Lapid was appointed Advisory Board Chairman of Yad Vashem, the Holocaust Martyrs' and Heroes' Remembrance Authority, a role he called "a sacred duty".

He appeared on Council of Wise Men, an Israeli television program on Israel 10 channel. He hosted his own radio program on Reshet Bet. He also was a chairman of the Israel Chess Society and served as an honorary member of the Raoul Wallenberg Foundation.

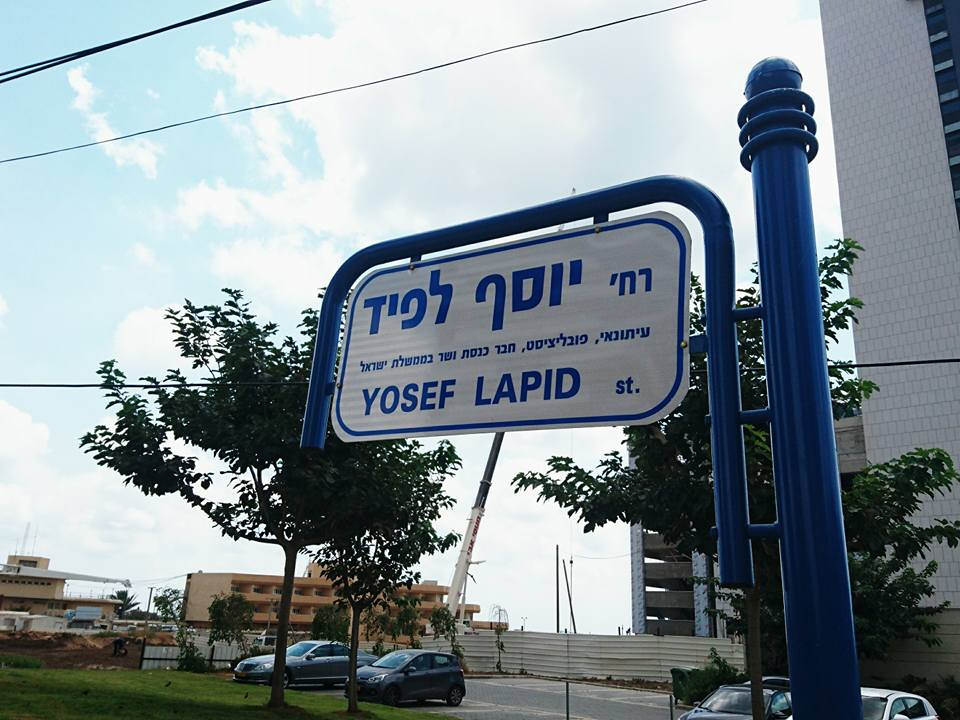
Street sign named after Yosef Lapid in Netanya

== Death ==
Lapid was hospitalized at Ichilov Hospital in Tel Aviv in serious condition on 30 May 2008. He died on 1 June 2008, aged 76, after a battle with cancer.

== Other ==
In March 2011, street Nova 30 in Veternik, a suburb of Novi Sad, was renamed to ulica Tomija Josefa Lapida (Serbian for "Tommy Joseph Lapid Street").
