= Ofer Lifschitz =

Israeli politician

Ofer Lifschitz, (Hebrew: עפר ליפשיץ; born in kibbutz Masada in 1958) is an Israeli politician and head of Brit Olam.

Lifschitz left Israel to travel in 1984, before settling in the United States in 1988. There, he set up an electrical contracting firm, and co-founded Global Peace Solution, a charity focusing on international conflict resolution.

In 2004 Lifschitz returned to Israel and founded Brit Olam.
