= Meli Polishook-Bloch =

Israeli politician

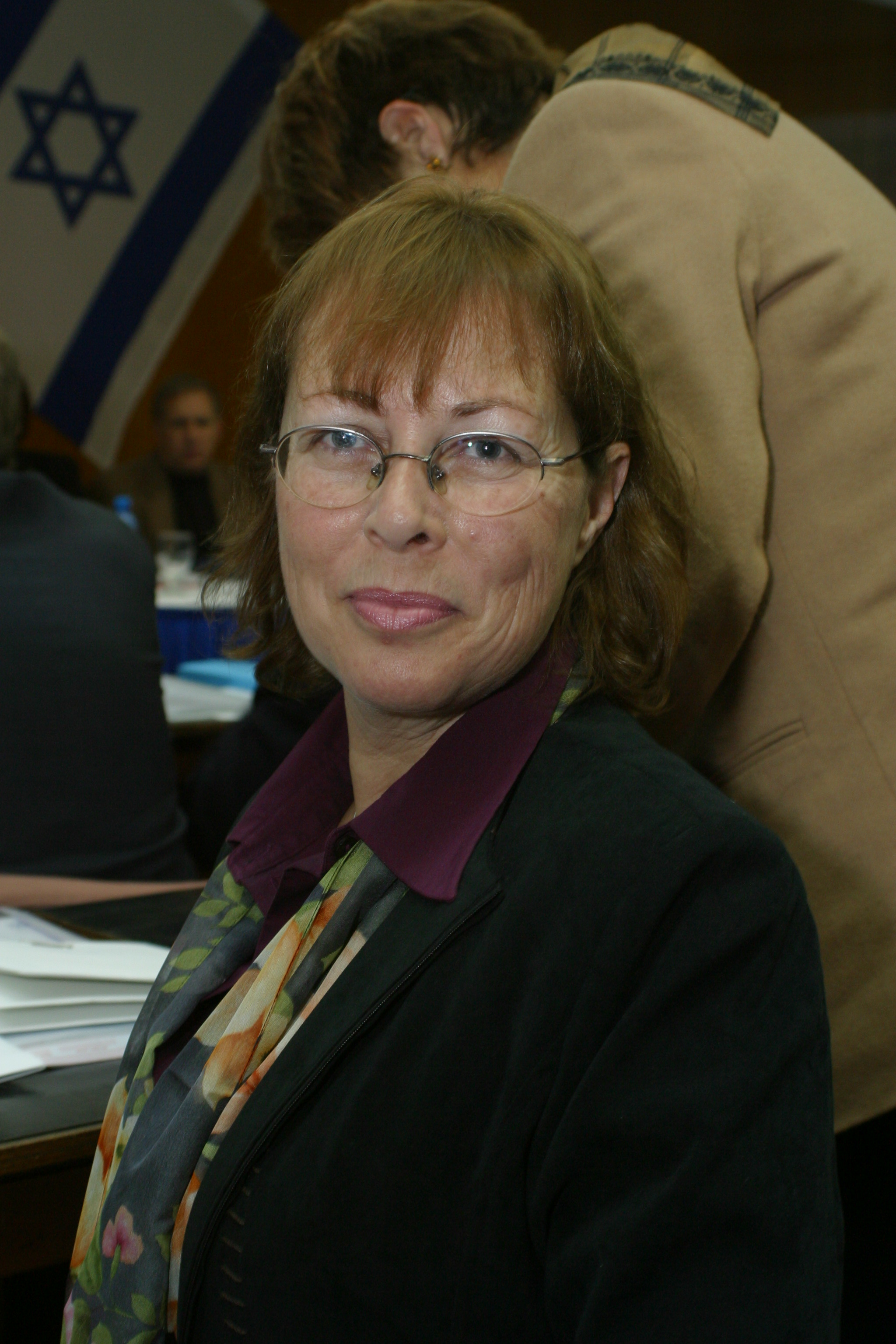
- Polishook-Bloch in 2003

Faction represented in the Knesset
- 2003–2006: Shinui
- 2006: Secular Faction

Other roles
- 2005: Shadow Minister of Education, Culture & Sports
- 2005: Shadow Minister of Science & Technology

Personal details
- Born: 14 January 1953 (age 73) Ra'anana, Israel

Meli Polishook-Bloch (Hebrew: מלי פולישוק־בלוך; born 14 January 1953) is an Israeli former politician who served as a member of the Knesset for Shinui and the Secular Faction between 2003 and 2006.

== Biography ==
Born in Ra'anana, Polishook-Bloch gained a BA in political science and theatre arts and an MA in political science and public policy from Tel Aviv University. She also gained an LLB from the Interdisciplinary Center in Herzliya.

In 1981 she joined Shinui, and served as chair of the party's information committee between 1990 and 1999. In the 1999 elections she was placed ninth on the party's list, but missed out on a seat when they won only six mandates. Between 1999 and 2003 she chaired the party's economic committee.

For the 2003 elections she was placed eighth on the Shinui list, and entered the Knesset when the party won 15 seats. During her first term, she chaired the Science and Technology Committee, the Education, Culture, and Sports Committee and the State Control Committee, and was also chairwoman of the Israel-Finland Friendship Union.

Along with most of the party's MKs, she defected to the Secular Faction (which later became Hetz) shortly before the 2006 elections following disagreements over the results of Shinui's primary results. She was placed fourth on the Hetz list for the elections, but lost her seat when the party failed to cross the electoral threshold.
