= Ilan Shalgi =

Israeli lawyer and politician (born 1945)

- אילן שלגי
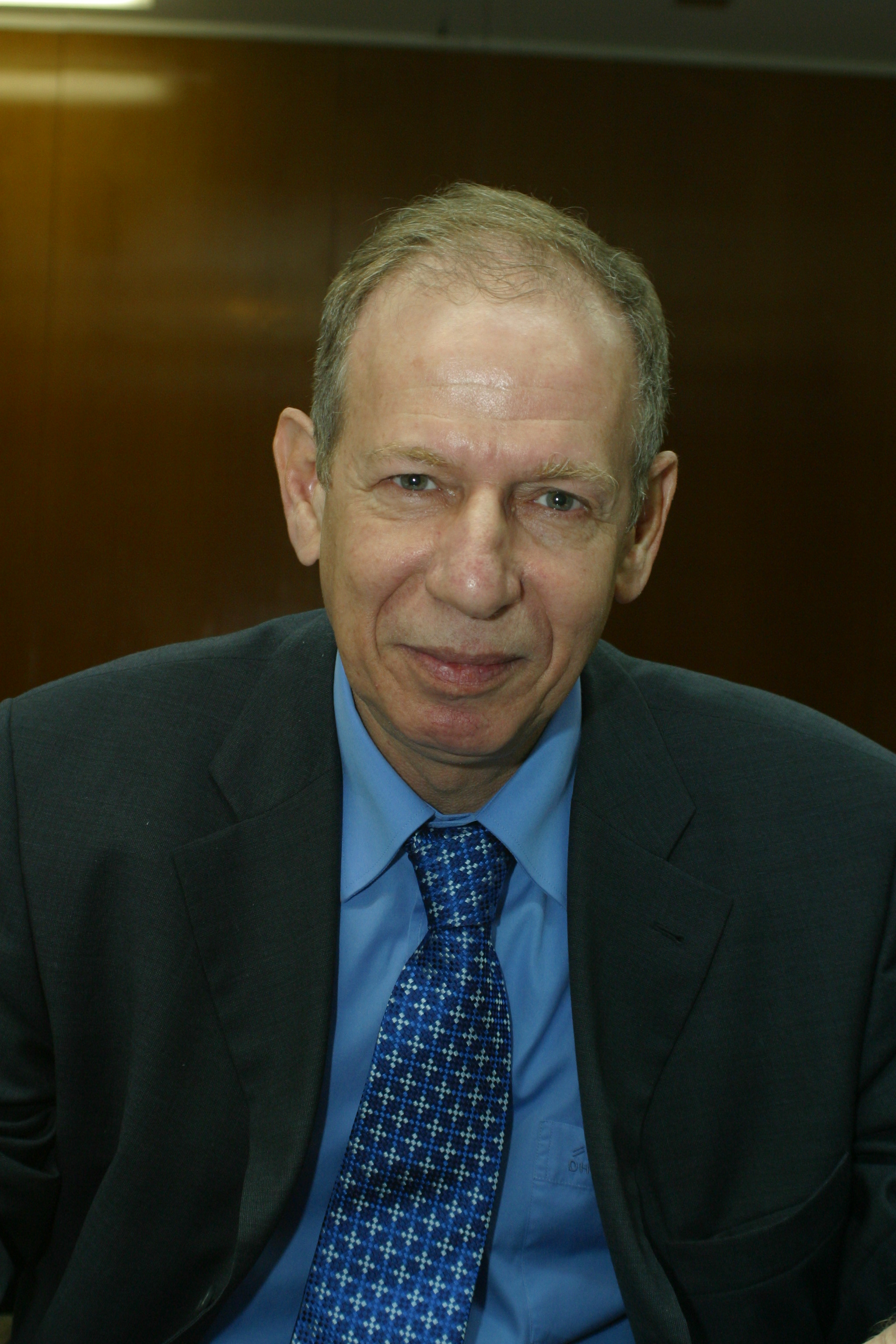

Ministerial roles
- 2004: Minister of Science & Technology
- 2004: Minister of the Environment

Faction represented in the Knesset
- 2003–2006: Shinui
- 2006: Secular Faction

Other roles
- 2005: Shadow Minister of Defense
- 2005: Shadow Minister of the Environment

Personal details
- Born: 13 July 1945

Ilan Shalgi (Hebrew: אילן שלגי; born 13 July 1945) is an Israeli lawyer, politician and a former member of the Knesset.

== Background ==
After his national service in the IDF, in which he served as a lieutenant-colonel, Shalgi gained an LLB and an MA in law from Tel Aviv University. He was a member of the Tel Aviv District Disciplinary Court and National Court of Appeals of the Israeli Bar between 1986 and 1995.

Between 1987 and 1990 he was chairman of the Friends of Youth Corps, and in 1993 became Chairman of the National Crude Oil Company directorate, a position he held until 1996.

== Political career ==
Shalgi joined the secular-liberal party Shinui, and served as chairman of its secretariat between 1996 and 1999 and again from 2001 to 2003, as well as chairing the party's foreign affairs and defense committee. In the 2003 elections he was elected to the Knesset and chaired the Education, Culture and Sports Committee.

In July 2004 he was appointed Minister of Science and Technology in Ariel Sharon's government as a replacement for Eliezer Sandberg (Sandberg became Minister of National Infrastructure after the Yosef Paritzky affair). In October 2004 he was appointed acting Minister of the Environment when fellow Shinui MK Yehudit Naot was suffering from cancer. Following her death in November, Shalgi's position was made permanent, and he gave up the Science and Technology ministry.

However, in December 2004 Shinui left the coalition after disagreements on the 2005 budget, and Shalgi left his ministerial post. He followed Avraham Poraz when Shinui split after internal elections, and joined the Secular Faction. He lost his seat when Hetz (the Secular Faction's successor) failed to cross the electoral threshold in the 2006 elections.
