= Ya'akov Cohen =

Israeli rabbi and former politician

- יעקב כהן
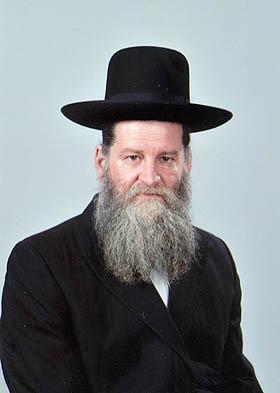

Faction represented in the Knesset
- 2006–2008: United Torah Judaism

Personal details
- Born: 13 July 1953 (age 71); Bnei Brak, Israel

Ya'akov Cohen (Hebrew: יעקב כהן; born 13 July 1953) is an Israeli rabbi and former politician.

== Biography ==
Born in Bnei Brak, Cohen was ordained as a rabbi at the Beit Talmud LeHora'a. He founded the Hassidic Bnei Brak Seminary in 1980 and served as a director until 2001.

For the 2006 Knesset elections he was placed sixth on the United Torah Judaism list, and became a Knesset member when the party won six seats. He resigned his seat on 31 July 2008 as part of a rotation agreement between the Agudat Yisrael and Degel HaTorah factions of UTJ, and was replaced by Uri Maklev (Cohen belongs to Agudat Yisrael).

Ya'akov Cohen denounced 2006 Jerusalem gay rights rally stating, "This isn't the gay pride parade but the disgrace parade!"
