= Avraham Poraz =

Israeli lawyer and politician

- אברהם פורז
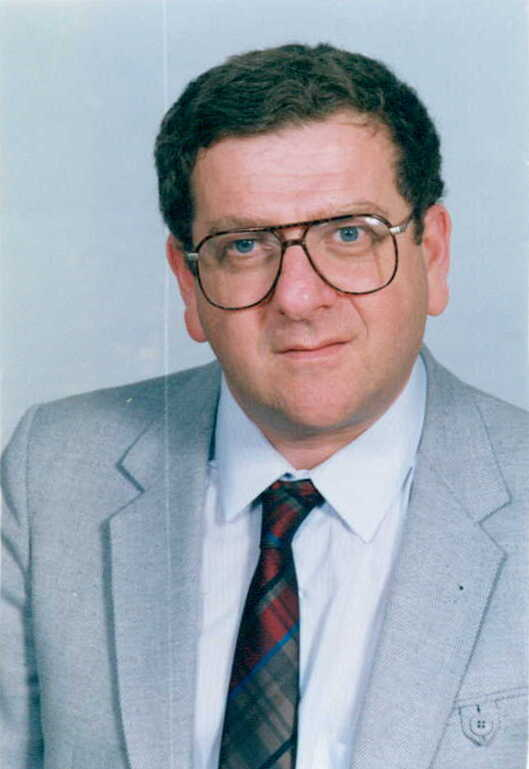

Ministerial roles
- 2003–2004: Minister of the Interior

Faction represented in the Knesset
- 1988–1992: Shinui
- 1992–1999: Meretz
- 1999–2006: Shinui
- 2006: Secular Faction

Other roles
- 2005: Shadow Acting Prime Minister
- 2005: Shadow Minister of Finance
- 2005: Shadow Minister of Communications
- 1983–1988: Tel Aviv-Yafo City Councillor
- 2018–: Tel Aviv-Yafo City Councillor

Personal details
- Born: 9 August 1945 (age 80) Bucharest, Romania

Avraham Poraz (Hebrew: אברהם פורז; born 9 August 1945) is an Israeli lawyer and politician serving as a member of the Tel Aviv City Council since 2018. Poraz previously served as Minister of the Interior between 2003 and 2004 and as a member of the Knesset between 1988 and 2006.

== Biography ==
Poraz was born in Bucharest, Romania in 1945 and immigrated to Israel in 1950. He served in the Military Police Corps of the Israel Defense Forces and later studied law in the Hebrew University in Jerusalem and was certified as a lawyer.

From 1983 to 1988 he was a member of the Tel Aviv Municipal Council and chairman of the City Auditing Committee. He was chairman of the Shinui Party Secretariat from 1982 to 1983 and again from 1988 to 1990. From 1984 to 1988 he was head of the project for setting up the Israeli Channel 2, the cable TV and the regional radio.

In 1988 he was elected to the Knesset for Shinui. In the following election, he was elected for Meretz, into which Shinui had merged. He served as a member of the House Committee; the Constitution, Law and Justice Committee; the Ethics Committee; the Internal Affairs and Environment Committee and the Finance Committee. He also served as Chairman of the Economics Committee. In February 2003, he was appointed Minister of the Interior by Prime Minister Ariel Sharon.

In July 2004 it was revealed that a fellow Shinui party member, Yosef Paritzky, had tried to frame him during the party primary elections. Paritzky confessed and was fired from his position as Minister of Infrastructure. In December 2004, after Shinui had voted against the state budget for 2004, Sharon fired Poraz along with the rest of his faction.

In the Shinui primary elections to the seventeenth Knesset, he lost the second place in its list. He left Shinui with ten other MKs and founded the Secular Faction, later renamed Hetz, which failed to pass the electoral threshold. He then retired from politics and returned to legal practice. Poraz sought election to the Tel Aviv city council in 2013 and was assigned the fourth slot on the Green Revolution list, but was not elected. He ran again in 2018, and was assigned the second slot on the Secular Greens list, and was elected as the party won two seats. Poraz was re-elected in 2024 as the Secular Greens retained its two seats.

He is married, and has two children.
