= 2003 Israeli legislative election =

- 28 January 2003
- All 120 seats in the Knesset; 61 seats needed for a majority
- Turnout: 67.81% (▼10.89 pp)
Party	Leader	Vote %	Seats	+/–
Likud	Ariel Sharon	29.39	38	+19
Labor	Amram Mitzna	14.46	19	−7
Shinui	Yosef Lapid	12.28	15	+9
Shas	Eli Yishai	8.22	11	−6
National Union	Avigdor Lieberman	5.52	7	+3
Meretz	Yossi Sarid	5.21	6	−4
Mafdal	Effi Eitam	4.20	6	+1
UTJ	Yaakov Litzman	4.29	5	0
Hadash–Ta'al	Mohammad Barakeh	2.98	3	0
One Nation	Amir Peretz	2.76	3	+1
Balad	Azmi Bishara	2.26	3	+1
Yisrael BaAliyah	Natan Sharansky	2.15	2	−4
United Arab List	Abdulmalik Dehamshe	2.08	2	−3
This lists parties that won seats. See the complete results below.
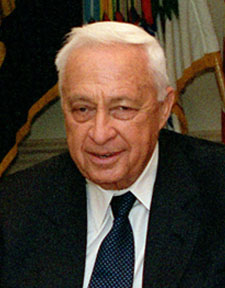
Prime Minister before	Prime Minister after
Ariel Sharon; Likud	Ariel Sharon; Likud

Legislative elections for the 16th Knesset were held in Israel on 28 January 2003. The result was a resounding victory for Ariel Sharon's Likud.

The previous separate election for Prime Minister was scrapped, and the post was returned to the leader of the party successfully forming the working coalition government.

== Background ==
=== Second Intifada ===
Similarly to the 2001 elections for the position of prime minister, these elections were also affected by the Second Intifada, which was a period of intense fighting and Palestinian militancy campaigns. Despite the fact that since the last elections there was a significant deterioration in the security situation in Israel, after Operation Defensive Shield in May 2002 and Operation Determined Path in June 2002, there was an improvement in the security situation.

The fact that Binyamin Ben-Eliezer was the defense minister in most of this period (until the unity government was dismantled) did not allow the Labor party to establish an alternative to government policies, mainly because it was difficult to present a position contrary to that which was supported by the party up until then. Contributing this was the militaristic tendency of large sections from the Israeli public that supported more severe measures than those which were actually implemented against the Palestinians for militant and terrorist attacks against Israelis. This tendency led to a situation in which the significant differences regarding the way Israel should react to the Intifada were not split between the Labor party and the Likud party, but rather between the dovish faction in the Labor party (which supported the positions of the left-wing Meretz party) and the hawkish faction in the Labor party (whose position was very close to that of the Likud party).

Although Prime Minister Ehud Barak did not run in these elections (and in practice was almost two years out of the political system), at the time Ehud Barak and the Labor Party were widely considered by many in the Israeli public as those directly responsible for the outbreak of the second intifada.

In general, similar to previous elections, the Intifada created a significant gap in the public opinions, as the public which once identified itself as "moderate left" drifted significantly away from the left, leaving a vacuum between it and the far left group. This situation significantly affected the potential voters of the Labor Party, which since 1977 relied primarily on the moderate left.

In addition, the situation in which Prime Minister Ariel Sharon announced that early elections would be held, just several days after the Labor party left the unity government, caught the Labor party in a situation in which it did not yet receive a chance to elect the head of the party. When it eventually elected Amram Mitzna, he had little more than one month to gather the attention of the Israeli public and convince the Israeli public of his positions—the most prominent among them being his claim that Israel had no interest in continuing to have control in the Gaza Strip and in the West Bank.

=== Labor party leadership struggle ===
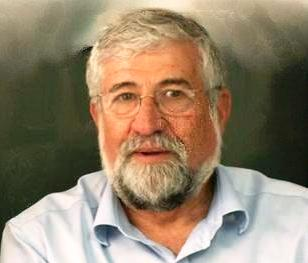
Amram Mitzna, the head of the Labor–Meimad list

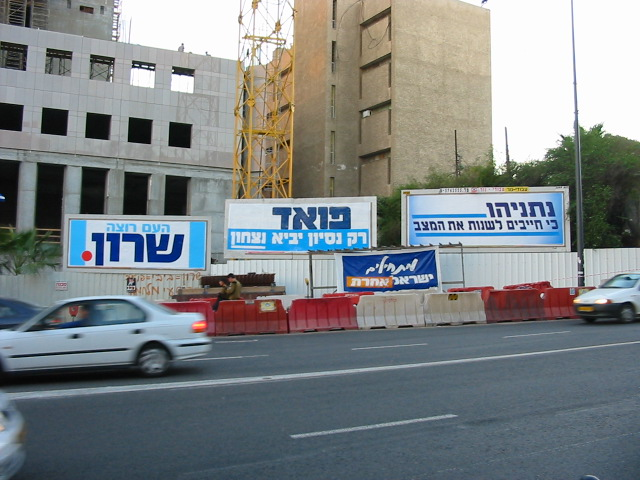
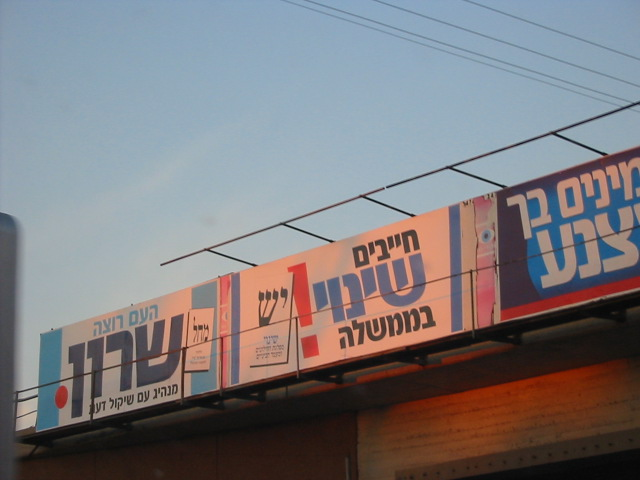
Various campaign billboard signs in Tel Aviv

After Barak took a break from politics in late February 2001, the Labor party established a unity government with the Likud party, in which Shimon Peres represented the Labor party as the most senior figure of its ministers. At the same time, Benyamin Ben-Eliezer competed against Matan Vilnai for the position of defense minister in the unity government (Shimon Peres was appointed to the position of Minister of Foreign Affairs). A party leadership election was set for September 4, 2001. These primaries were supposedly won by Avraham Burg (who was the Speaker of the Knesset at the time), although in practice there was a very small number of votes (only 1,000 votes in favor of Burg), which led to many claims of fraud, especially of fraud within ballots of the Israeli Druze community. After a long series of discussions and accusations regarding ethnic discrimination of the Druze public, it was decided that the primaries would be held again in 51 polling stations (mostly within the Druze community) on 26 December. Those elections had a relatively low voter turnout and at the end of those elections, Ben-Eliezer won with a small gap of just 1,900 votes.

Although winning the Labor party's leader position allegedly promised Ben Eliezer his candidacy for prime minister for the Labor party, in practice the problematic election process led to many issues which were also affected by the lack of enthusiasm from the dovish faction of the Labor party to Ben Eliezer's policy as defense minister. After making serious allegations of racial discrimination against him due to being Sephardi, Ben Eliezer was forced to agree to another round of primaries. During the period of time between the decision to hold another leadership election and the primaries themselves, which were set for 19 November 2002, the Labor party withdrew from the unity government, which led to rumors that the main reason they withdrew was due to the considerations regarding the primaries. The primaries were eventually won by Amram Mitzna, who at that point in time was the mayor of Haifa. He won 53% of the votes while Ben-Eliezer won 38% of the votes and Haim Ramon won only 7% of the votes.

=== Disintegration of the unity government ===
Operation Defensive Shield and Operation Determined Path, which ended the Israeli policy of restraint in response to Palestinian terrorist attacks, succeeded in considerably reducing the numbers of terrorist attacks carried out against Israel; nevertheless, they led to the disintegration of the unity government. In addition, the economic situation also deteriorated significantly, and after Operation Defensive Shield, an emergency economic plan was brought forth on April 25, 2002, which was called Economic Defensive Shield (חומת מגן כלכלית).

A temporary lull in terrorist attacks against Israelis was among the reasons that the Shas party ministers opposed the emergency economic plan and voted against it in the Knesset. This situation caused Prime Minister Ariel Sharon to fire the Shas ministers on May 20. Nevertheless, Shas rejoined the government on June 3, but this step was the beginning of the end of the unity government. On July 28 David Levy and his breakaway Gesher faction left the government due to their opposition to the budget. Although their departure was not significant at the time, further ahead this caused difficulties for the continued existence of the unity government.

When the Labor party withdrew from the unity government in September due to their opposition to the economic policy, the state budget, and the new defense policy, Prime Minister Ariel Sharon's government had to re-appoint several new ministers to his government. As a result, Benjamin Netanyahu was appointed as the Foreign Minister on November 1, and Shaul Mofaz was appointed as the defense minister the next day (a move which aroused much criticism due to its timing - Mofaz was appointed to this position only four months after he finished serving in the military as the Chief of Staff of the Israel Defense Forces). Eventually Sharon announced the dissolution of the Knesset and early elections.

=== Likud leadership struggle ===
While Sharon enjoyed high approval among the general public, his move towards the political center had offput many in they party's right-wing base, making him appear vulnerable in the party's leadership election, which was scheduled for 28 November 2002. Three hours after Sharon announced the snap election, former prime minister and party leader Benjamin Netanyahu declared his candidacy for the leadership election. Sharon Defeated Netanyahu and Moshe Feiglin in the election, winning 55% of the vote to Netanyahu's 40% and Feiglin's 3%.

=== Formation of Meretz - Democratic Choice - Shahar ===
In 2002, Beilin founded the extraparliamentary Shahar Movement, whose stated purpose was to unite Israel's left-wing parties. Beilin initially remained in the Labor party, but secured a low slot on the party's electoral list in the 2003 primaries, and thus left the party with Yael Dayan. The two ran on a joint list with Meretz and the Democratic Choice as representatives of the Shahar Movement. Beilin and Dayan were given the 11th and 12th slots on the joint list.

=== Tal Law and its implications ===
On 23 July 2002, the Knesset approved the Tal Law as an attempt to reach a compromise to the public demand that the Israeli ultra-Orthodox citizens would share an equal extent of obligations which other Israeli citizens are required to fulfill, specifically requiring them to serve in the Israel Defense Forces. The coalition upheavals delayed the initial adoption of the Tal law.

The adoption of the law, which in practice legitimized the existing massive draft dodging within the ultra-Orthodox community (while giving them the option to work for a whole year after they get to the age of 18, and afterwards giving them the option to choose whether to join the military or civilian service, or return to the yeshiva), caused a significant strengthening of contempt among the Israeli public towards the ultra-Orthodox community, as most non-Muslim non-ultra-Orthodox Israelis are obligated to serve in the military for several years when they reach age 18. The main effect the Tal Law had in this elections was a significant strengthening to the Shinui party.

=== Ariel Sharon's investigations ===
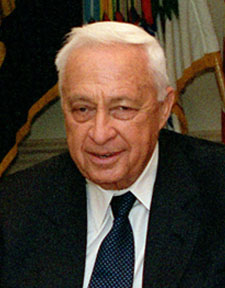
The Likud Party chairman Ariel Sharon.

In late 1999, during Ariel Sharon's election campaign for the Likud leadership, Sharon collected donations totaling six million NIS in ways that were prohibited under the law regulating the funding of political parties. The Comptroller's Report published in early September 2001 stated that these contributions were breaking the law (a previous similar complaint against Netanyahu led to the issuing of a warning, and a similar complaint against Ehud Barak even led to an investigation regarding the organizations that helped him get elected). As a result, Sharon returned 1.5 million NIS to the donors on October 4, but had difficulties in raising the more funds. On October 22, Sharon's son Gilad was able to get a loan at a relatively high interest from Bank Leumi, and then made contact with the South African businessman Cyril Kern, who gave him a loan for the rest of the balance on November 30 (even though the money was actually transferred only on 17 January 2002). Cyril Kern's money was transferred to the Israel Discount Bank on 30 April 2002 and was returned to Cyril Kern on 17 December.

These facts, coupled with the lack of clarity regarding the extent of Cyril Kern's businesses in Israel, became "political dynamite", and were investigated during the election campaign by the State Attorney's Office. On 6 January 2003, the details of the affair were revealed by Haaretz. (It turned out later on that the attorney Liora Glatt-Berkowitz, who was in charge of the investigation, leaked the information.)

The exposure of the affair caused a political storm and led to calls for the resignation of Ariel Sharon from the opposition. On the other hand, Likud members alleged that the leak of the affair's details was politically motivated and intended to harm Sharon's popularity.

== Parliament factions ==
The table below lists the parliamentary factions represented in the 15th Knesset.

Name	Ideology	Symbol	Leader	1999 result		Seats at 2002 dissolution
Name	Ideology	Symbol	Leader	Votes (%)	Seats	Seats at 2002 dissolution
Labor-Meimad	Social democracy	אמת	Amram Mitzna	20.3% (Note: Labor, Meimad and Gesher ran as a joint list called One Israel.)	24 / 120	25 / 120
Gesher	Liberal conservatism Economic egalitarianism	אמת	David Levy	20.3%	2 / 120	2 / 120
Likud	National liberalism	מחל	Ariel Sharon	14.1%	19 / 120	21 / 120
Shas	Religious conservatism Populism	שס	Eli Yishai	13.0%	17 / 120	17 / 120
Meretz	Progressivism; Secularism	מרצ	Yossi Sarid	7.6%	10 / 120	10 / 120
Yisrael BaAliyah	Russian speakers' interests	כן	Natan Sharansky	5.1%	6 / 120	6 / 120
Shinui	Secularism; Liberalism	יש	Tommy Lapid	5.0%	6 / 120	6 / 120
Centre Party	Centrism	פה	Dan Meridor	5.0%	6 / 120	2 / 120
Mafdal	Religious Zionism	ב	Zevulun Orlev	4.2%	5 / 120	5 / 120
UTJ	Religious conservatism	ג	Yaakov Litzman	3.7%	5 / 120	5 / 120
Ra'am	Arab nationalism Islamism	עם	Ibrahim Sarsur	3.4%	5 / 120	5 / 120
National Union	Right-wing populism National conservatism	יט	Benny Elon	3.0%	4 / 120	4 / 120
Hadash	Communism; Socialism	ו	Mohammad Barakeh	2.6%	3 / 120	3 / 120
Yisrael Beiteinu	Nationalism; Secularism	ל	Avigdor Lieberman	2.6%	4 / 120	4 / 120
Balad	Palestinian nationalism	ד	Azmi Bishara	1.9%	2 / 120	2 / 120
One Nation	Social democracy Labourism	ם	Amir Peretz	1.9%	2 / 120	2 / 120

== Campaign ==
During the campaign, Meretz attacked Shinui (previously one of Meretz's co-founders) for being a 'passing fad' party, in the same way as Dash, Tzomet and the Centre Party had been.

=== Party slogans ===
Party or alliance	Original slogan	English translation
likud	"העם רוצה שרון"	“The people wants Sharon”
Shas	"למען העתיד של כולנו"	“For all our futures”
Meretz	"יש לנו מרצ לעשות"	"We have the energy [Meretz] to do this"
Yisrael BaAliyah	"שרנסקי- ימין. שפוי. נקי."	"Sharansky. Right-wing. Sane. Clean.
Shinui	"חייבים שינוי בממשלה"	"We need change [Shinui] in the government"
Mafdal	"שומרים על הבית שלנו"	"Guarding our home"
UTJ	"כדי שנוכל לחיות כאן"	"So we can live here"
National Union	"האיחוד הלאומי – יהדות עם בטחון"	The National Union - Judaism with Security
National Union	רק ליברמן יכול עליהם"	"Only Lieberman can do it"
Hadash-Ta'al	"אין דמוקרטיה בלי שוויון"	"There is no democracy without equality"
One Nation	"המפלגה החברתית היחידה בישראל"	"The only social party in Israel"

== Results ==
Party	Votes	%	Seats	+/–
Likud	925,279	29.39	38	+19
Labor–Meimad	455,183	14.46	19	−6
Shinui	386,535	12.28	15	+9
Shas	258,879	8.22	11	−6
National Union	173,973	5.53	7	−1
Meretz - Democratic Choice - Shahar	164,122	5.21	6	−4
National Religious Party	132,370	4.20	6	+1
United Torah Judaism	135,087	4.29	5	0
Hadash–Ta'al	93,819	2.98	3	0
One Nation	86,808	2.76	3	+1
Balad	71,299	2.26	3	+1
Yisrael BaAliyah	67,719	2.15	2	−4
United Arab List	65,551	2.08	2	−3
Ale Yarok	37,855	1.20	0	0
Herut – The National Movement	36,202	1.15	0	New
Progressive National Alliance	20,571	0.65	0	New
The Greens	12,833	0.41	0	0
Yisrael Aheret	7,144	0.23	0	New
Ahavat Yisrael	5,468	0.17	0	New
Tzomet	2,023	0.06	0	0
Centre Party	1,961	0.06	0	−6
Da'am Workers Party	1,925	0.06	0	0
Citizen and State	1,566	0.05	0	New
Man's Rights in the Family Party	1,284	0.04	0	0
Lahava	1,181	0.04	0	New
Za'am	894	0.03	0	New
Leader	833	0.03	0	New
Total	3,148,364	100.00	120	0
Valid votes	3,148,364	98.36		
Invalid/blank votes	52,409	1.64		
Total votes	3,200,773	100.00		
Registered voters/turnout	4,720,079	67.81		
Source: Israel Democracy Institute

== Aftermath ==
Apart from Likud's clear victory, the election was also a success for the secularist Shinui. Despite gains by the right in the election, multiple polls showed strong public support for policies advocated by the left (such as dismantling settlements, unilaterally withdrawing from Gaza, and creating a Palestinian state).

Ariel Sharon formed the 30th government on 28 February 2003. His coalition initially included just Shinui and the National Union, although Yisrael BaAliyah had merged into Likud soon after the election. On 3 March the National Religious Party joined the government.

Sharon's decision to implement the Gaza disengagement plan led to the National Union and the National Religious Party leaving the coalition during June and November 2004 respectively. Shinui left the government in December 2004 following disagreements over the budget. The party later disintegrated following a disputed leadership election, with eleven MKs leaving to form the Secular Faction and one left to establish HaOlim, which merged into the National Union. Two MKs later left the Secular Faction to establish National Home.

Labor–Meimad joined the coalition in January 2005, with Agudat Yisrael added to the government in March 2005. Labor–Meimad later pulled out in November that year, the same month in which Sharon led a breakaway of fourteen MKs from Likud to form Kadima. Likud left the coalition in January 2006. Following Sharon's stroke, Ehud Olmert took over as Acting Prime Minister.

The Knesset term also saw one of One Nation's MKs leave to form Noy, before joining Likud. One Nation then merged into Labor. Yisrael Beiteinu broke away from the National Union, whilst two MKs left the National Religious Party to establish the Renewed Religious National Zionist Party.

Prior to the 2006 elections, United Torah Judaism split into Agudat Yisrael (three seats) and Degel HaTorah (two seats), whilst Ta'al (one seat) broke away from Hadash.

== See also ==
- List of members of the sixteenth Knesset
- 2002 Israeli Labor Party primary
- Party lists for the 2003 Israeli legislative election
