= Shinui =

Shinui שינוי
- Leader: Ron Levintal; Tommy Lapid; Avraham Poraz; Amnon Rubinstein
- Founded: 26 March 1974
- Split from: Dash (1978)
- Merged into: Dash (1976); Hetz (2006)
- Ideology: Liberalism (Israeli); Economic liberalism; Civil libertarianism; Secularism; Anti-clericalism; Liberal Zionism
- Political position: Before 1999: Centre-left; After 1999: Centre
- International affiliation: Liberal International
- Alliance: Meretz (1992–1997)
- Knesset: 0 / 120
- Most MKs: 15 (2003)

Election symbol
- הן, יש

Website
- shinui.org.il

Shinui (Hebrew: שִׁינּוּי, lit. 'Change') was a Zionist, secular, and anti-clerical free market liberal party and political movement in Israel. The party twice became the third-largest in the Knesset, but both occasions were followed by a split and collapse; in 1977, the party won 15 seats as part of the Democratic Movement for Change, but the alliance split in 1978, and Shinui was reduced to two seats at the next elections. In 2003, the party won 15 seats alone, but lost them all three years later after most of its MKs left to form new parties. The party was a member of Liberal International until 2009.

Though it had been the standard-bearer of economic liberalism and secularism in Israel for 30 years, the formation of Kadima robbed Shinui of its natural constituency, and in January 2006 the party split into small factions, none of which managed to overcome the 2% threshold needed to enter the Knesset.

== History ==
=== 1970s ===
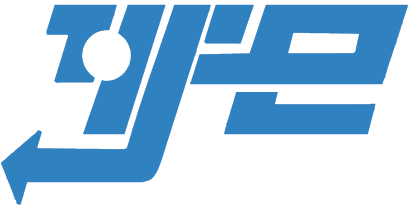
Original logo of Shinui at the time of its establishment in 1974

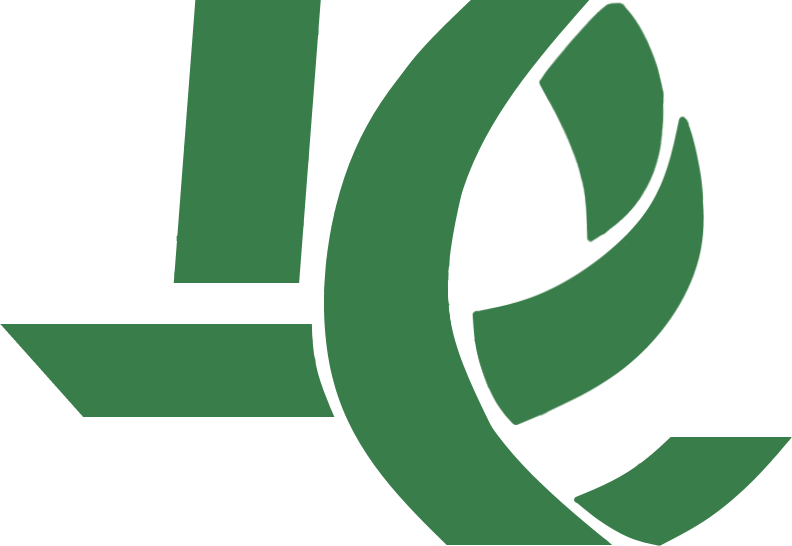
Original logo of the Movement for Change and Initiative, the name of the party following its departure from Dash and prior to adopting the name 'Shinui'

As Israel made its transition from a developing nation into an economically prosperous one, a highly educated middle class emerged, tracing its historical political orientation to Labor Zionism. Many of these Israelis banded together to form Shinui.

Shinui was established by business people and academics in 1974, following the 1973 Arab–Israeli Yom Kippur War, which shook the Israeli public. Prior to the 1977 elections, it formed an alliance with several other small liberal parties. Initially, the party was called Democrats–Shinui, but was soon changed to the Democratic Movement for Change, and, as with many parties in Israel, became popularly known by its acronym, Dash. The new party caught the public's imagination, with over 37,000 people signing up as members within a few weeks of its foundation. It also pioneered the use of primaries to choose its electoral list, something that was intended to show its democratic credentials and prevent cronyism. Previously, in Israel, party lists had been decided upon by the parties' committees, but since the late 1970s, many parties in Israel (excluding the ultra-Orthodox parties Shas and United Torah Judaism, and the centrist parties like Yesh Atid, Hosen, Telem, and Kulanu) have followed Dash's lead and adopted the primaries system.

The new party won 15 seats, the best performance by the third party since the 1961 elections. This made it the third-largest party after Menachem Begin's Likud and the Alignment, which had shrunk from 51 to 32 seats. However, Begin was still able to form a narrow 61-seat right-wing coalition with Shlomtzion (Ariel Sharon's party), the National Religious Party, and Agudat Israel.

Dash were invited into the coalition in November 1977, five months after the Knesset term had started. The party picked up several ministerial portfolios: Meir Amit was made Minister of Transportation and Minister of Communications, Shmuel Tamir became Minister of Justice, and Yigael Yadin was named as Deputy Prime Minister. However, the fact that Dash did not control the balance of power led to internal disagreements over its role. The alliance began to disintegrate, finally splitting in three on 14 September 1978, with seven MKs breaking away to form the Movement for Change and Initiative, which was later renamed Shinui, another seven founding the Democratic Movement, and Assaf Yaguri creating Ya'ad. Shinui (including Amit) and Ya'ad left the coalition, whilst the Democratic Movement, which included Tamir and Yadin, remained in the government. Two Shinui MKs defected to the Alignment, leaving the party with five seats in 1981.

=== 1980s ===
In the 1981 elections, the party was reduced to two seats. In 1984, they won three seats, and were invited to join the national unity government, but pulled out of the coalition on 26 May 1987. Although the party gained an MK from the Alignment, it lost Mordechai Virshubski to Ratz. The party was renamed Shinui – The Center Party during certain periods.

By 1985, Liberal International was considering admitting Shinui as a member in place of the Liberal Party. While the Liberal Party had formed an alliance with Herut in the Likud bloc, Shinui was dovish and allied with the Labor Alignment. Shinui joined Liberal International as a member in 1986.

=== 1990s ===
In the 1988 elections, Shinui presented a joint list with the New Liberal Party, and was reduced to two seats. Although the party gained an MK from the Alignment, they lost another to Ratz. However, in 1992, it joined with Ratz and Mapam to form the leftist alliance, Meretz. Meretz won 12 seats in the 1992 elections, and was Yitzhak Rabin's major coalition partners in his Labor-led government.

In 1996, the three parties decided to officially merge to form a united Meretz party. Although Shinui leader Amnon Rubinstein supported the merger, most party members sought to distance themselves from the leftist social-democratic elements in Meretz. Two MKs (out of the nine Meretz won in the 1996 elections) broke away to re-establish Shinui as an independent party in 1997 under the leadership of Avraham Poraz. In the run-up to the 1999 elections, the party's first independent electoral contest in 11 years, Poraz tried to brand the party as a representative of the middle class, and focused on reducing government intervention in the economy and tax burdens. However, this approach did not yield the party any new voters, and opinion polls predicted that Shinui would not make it past the threshold.

Meanwhile, Avraham Poraz's views and political activities, combined with his distance from Meretz's leftist stances and lack of public association between the two, won the support of TV celebrity Tommy Lapid, who was known for his fierce rhetoric against religious coercion. As a result of last-minute negotiations between the two, the party changed its name to Shinui – the Secular Movement, and reserved the most electable positions on the Shinui list to Lapid and his associates at the expense of established Shinui members. For example, Lapid himself, who was not a party member at the time, was given the first place on the list, traditionally reserved to the party leader, while Poraz (who remained Shinui's formal party leader) was relegated to second place.

In the elections, Shinui won 6 seats, and announced its refusal to join any coalition that includes the ultra-Orthodox parties Shas and United Torah Judaism. As a result of this relative success in the 1999 elections, Lapid and his representatives formally joined the Shinui party, with the party leadership passing from Poraz to Lapid.

=== 2000s ===
In the 2003 elections, the party won 15 seats, making it the third-largest in the Knesset. Ariel Sharon invited the party to form a secular coalition, with Shinui taking several key ministerial positions, including the Internal Affairs ministry, a key position in the secular-religious struggle. The party used its bargaining power to close down the Religious Affairs ministry.

Shinui presented itself as centrist on security issues.

==== Paritzky affair ====
In July 2004, a tape recording of Shinui MK and Minister of Infrastructure Yosef Paritzki was exposed by Ayala Hasson. In the tape, Paritzki was heard to ask a private investigator to investigate the actions of his Shinui colleague Avraham Poraz. The private investigator was probably paid by the workers' union of Israel's Power Company (IPC), which wanted to prevent a law bill by Poraz denying the IPC workers many privileges they currently hold.

In response, Shinui publicly denounced and condemned Paritzki, and asked Prime Minister Ariel Sharon to fire Paritzki from the cabinet, and called on Paritzki to resign from the Knesset and leave Shinui. Paritzki refused, and blamed Shinui and other factors in a plot against him; he eventually formed his own party, Tzalash. A criminal investigation was ended without any indictment or any further legal proceedings.

==== Religious parties join the coalition ====
In August 2004, Sharon initiated coalition negotiations with several other parties after he lost the government majority required to support his disengagement plan. Although he preferred to form a Likud–Labor–Shinui "secular unity" government, this was thwarted by Likud MKs. Sharon then started negotiations with Shas and United Torah Judaism (UTJ). Although Shinui had vowed not to sit in a coalition with either party, after significant pressure from Sharon, and to avoid being blamed for thwarting the implementation of the disengagement plan, Lapid retracted his vow, and agreed to let UTJ join the coalition if they would agree to the government's principles.

==== Shinui out of the cabinet ====
On 1 December 2004, Shinui voted against Sharon's 2005 budget, which included subsidies to UTJ projects. In response, Sharon fired the Shinui ministers from the cabinet. On 10 January 2005, Labor joined the coalition, replacing Shinui. However, the party continued to support the disengagement and Finance Minister Binyamin Netanyahu's financial reforms. Following its departure from the government, the party formed a Shadow cabinet and was renamed Shinui – Party for the Secular and the Middle Class.

==== Poraz affair and party split ====
In June 2005, Poraz was confronted by party activists who accused him and Lapid of dictatorial control of the party, and was recorded by them offering vacation flights out of the country and other financial favours. The tape reached Maariv, which at the time was running its "Where is the Shame" anti-corruption campaign led by its editor Amnon Dankner and top columnist Dan Margalit. However, the affair generated little publicity, as the party was outside the government. Nevertheless, the issues were brought to a head in September 2005 when Rubinstein criticized Lapid for stifling criticism and not engaging efforts to expand the party's membership.

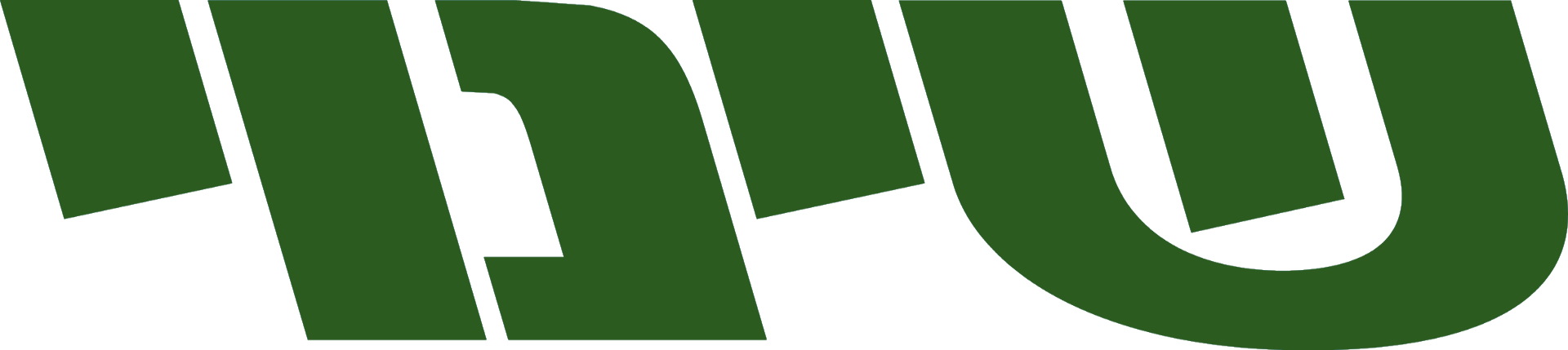
Logo adopted by the party in 2006

On 12 January 2006, the party held internal primary elections in preparation for the elections that year. In a surprise result, Ron Levintal beat Poraz in the contest for second place on the party's list behind Lapid (who was re-elected with 53% of the votes). This resulted in the party splitting, with five MKs (Poraz, Ilan Shalgi, Meli Polishook-Bloch, Eti Livni, and Roni Brizon) leaving the party to form a new party they claimed would represent the "real Shinui". On 25 January, Lapid resigned as party chairman, and left the party, declaring it no longer worthy of support. By then, a total of eleven MKs had left Shinui and formed a new party, the Secular Faction (later renamed Hetz), led by Poraz and supported by Lapid. After Yigal Yasinov also left the party, Shinui was left with only two MKs, Ehud Rassabi and Ilan Leibovitch.

Before the elections, Levintal made several conciliatory gestures toward Hetz, attempting negotiations with them, the anti-corruption Tafnit party led by Uzi Dayan, and former Prime Minister Ehud Barak over the prospect of forming a united front, but to no avail. In the election, Shinui won just 4,675 votes, 0.16% of the total, well below the 2% (62,741 votes) electoral threshold. Hetz won only 10,113 votes, meaning that both parties lost their Knesset representation.

==== Since the 2006 Knesset elections ====
The party did not run in the 2009 Knesset elections, and has not run in any subsequent national elections. It participated in combination with other parties, however, in the 2008 municipal elections in Haifa (led by Shlomo Gilboa), and won two seats. Shinui also participated in Tel Aviv-Yafo under the name Tel Avivim (led by Ron Levintal), but did not win any seats.

In 2012, Tommy Lapid's son, Yair Lapid, formed Yesh Atid, a secularist, centrist, liberal Zionist party that won 19 seats in the 2013 Knesset elections, making it the Knesset's second-largest party, and 11 seats in the 2015 Knesset elections. Yesh Atid is widely considered to be in the same tradition as Shinui, and has largely absorbed its electoral base.

== Ideology ==
=== Religion and state ===
Despite nearly 30 years of public support of liberal-capitalist economic and social policies, its best known platform plank is a call for separation of religion and state within the confines of Zionist ideology. It demands civil marriage (although it has opposed a bill to enact it in March 2004), the operation of public transportation, businesses, theaters, etc., on Shabbat, removal of laws concerning selling and importing non-kosher food, drafting of ultra-Orthodox Jews into the IDF, and a halt to payments to yeshiva students.

Because of such demands, and the inflammatory tone of its current leadership, it was sometimes accused of being anti-religious or hating the religious, and so, some, including many secular people who would otherwise agree with its platform, would not vote for it. The party's official position was that it does not oppose religion, but merely seeks to mend the inequities that exist because of religion. Their television campaign for the 2006 elections showed ultra-Orthodox Jews dragging onto secular voter, and as the secular man votes for Shinui, all the ultra-Orthodox vanish in midair.

Shinui supported gay rights, and conforming to its liberal orientation, Shinui adopted a unanimous resolution to create an in-party forum for gay, lesbian, bisexual, and transgender people.

=== Economy ===
Economically, Shinui supported a free market, privatization of public assets, and a lowering of taxes, especially taxes on the upper class. The party also objected to the introduction of a progressive estate tax.

=== Israeli–Palestinian conflict ===
Shinui's position on Israeli–Palestinian conflict was in accord with the mainstream centrist consensus. It supported achieving peace with the Palestinians even at the cost of territorial concessions. Shinui also supported the anti-terrorist policies of Ariel Sharon's government, such as the killing of Hamas leader Ahmed Yassin.

Shinui supported negotiation with the Palestinians concerning the final status and a Palestinian state, which would include removal of Israeli settlements and withdrawal from most of the West Bank and Gaza. It asserted that both the Right and Left misled the public - the Right by claiming that only force will solve the problem, and the Left by claiming that there is a Palestinian partner for peace.

Shinui strongly supported the Israeli West Bank barrier and the disengagement plan.

=== Political ethics and the fight against corruption ===
Shinui proclaimed itself as a defender of political purity and lawful conduct. It promised to set an example for an uncorrupted party whose members are not suspected of involvement in criminal activity or financial irregularities. Shinui saw itself as an antithesis to Shas, many of whose MKs have been convicted in various corruption probes. Accordingly, Lapid requested and received the Justice and Internal Affairs ministries when in government (the latter having been formerly held by Shas). Shinui also frequently praised the Supreme Court of Israel as a guardian of the law and moral values.

== Leaders of Shinui ==
	Leader	Took office	Left office
1	Amnon Rubinstein	1974	1996
2	Avraham Poraz	1996	1999
3	Tommy Lapid	1999	2006
4	Ron Levintal	2006	

== Election results ==
Election	Leader	Lead candidate	Votes	%	Seats	+/–	Status
1977	Amnon Rubinstein	Part of Dash			7 / 120	New	Government
1981	Amnon Rubinstein	Amnon Rubinstein	29,837	1.5 (#9)	2 / 120	▼5	Opposition
1984	Amnon Rubinstein	Amnon Rubinstein	54,747	2.7 (#7)	3 / 120	▲1	Government
1988	Amnon Rubinstein	Amnon Rubinstein	39,538	1.7 (#12)	2 / 120	▼1	Opposition
1992	Amnon Rubinstein	Part of Meretz			2 / 120	0	Government
1996	Amnon Rubinstein	Part of Meretz			2 / 120	0	Opposition
1999	Avraham Poraz	Tommy Lapid	167,748	5.0 (#6)	6 / 120	▲6	Opposition
2003	Tommy Lapid	Tommy Lapid	386,535	12.28 (#3)	15 / 120	▲9	Government
2006	Ron Levintal	Ron Levintal	4,675	0.16 (#19)	0 / 120	▼15	Extraparliamentary
2009	Ron Levintal	Did not contest			0 / 120	0	Extraparliamentary
2013	Ron Levintal	Did not contest			0 / 120	0	Extraparliamentary
2015	Ron Levintal	Did not contest			0 / 120	0	Extraparliamentary
April 2019	Ron Levintal	Did not contest			0 / 120	0	Extraparliamentary
September 2019	Ron Levintal	Did not contest			0 / 120	0	Extraparliamentary
2020	Ron Levintal	Did not contest			0 / 120	0	Extraparliamentary
2021	Ron Levintal	Did not contest			0 / 120	0	Extraparliamentary
2022	Ron Levintal	Did not contest			0 / 120	0	Extraparliamentary

== See also ==
- Liberalism in Israel
- Civil marriage in Israel
