= List of members of the sixteenth Knesset =

16th Knesset
←	15th	17th	→

Overview
- Legislative body: Knesset
- Jurisdiction: Israel
- Meeting place: Knesset building
- Term: 17 February 2003 – November 2005
- Election: 28 January 2003
- Government: 30th government

Knesset
- President: Moshe Katsav
- Prime minister: Ariel Sharon
- Speaker: Reuven Rivlin

The 120 members of the sixteenth Knesset were elected on 28 January 2003. The breakdown by party was as follows:

- Likud: 38
- Labor Party-Meimad: 19
- Shinui: 15
- Shas: 11
- National Union: 7
- Meretz-Yachad and the Democratic Choice: 6
- National Religious Party: 6
- United Torah Judaism: 5
- Hadash-Ta'al: 3
- One Nation: 3
- Balad: 3
- Yisrael BaAliyah: 2
- United Arab List: 2

== List of members ==
At the dissolution of the 16th Knesset, the members are as follows:

Party		Members
Likud (27)		Benjamin Netanyahu • Silvan Shalom • Dan Naveh • Limor Livnat • Israel Katz • Naomi Blumenthal • Uzi Landau • Gila Gamliel • Yuval Steinitz • Michael Eitan • David Levy • Gideon Sa'ar • Daniel Benlulu • Michael Ratzon • Ehud Yatom • Moshe Kahlon • Omri Sharon (Note: Replaced by David Mena (Likud) on 5 January 2006) • Michael Gorlovsky • Inbal Gavrieli • Gilad Erdan • Yehiel Hazan • Leah Ness • Reuven Rivlin • Haim Katz • Ayoob Kara • Marina Solodkin (Note: Yisrael BaAliyah merged into Likud) • Yuli Edelstein
Labor–Meimad (21)	Labor (20)	Amram Mitzna (Note: Replaced by Salah Tarif on 23 February 2005) • Binyamin Ben-Eliezer • Shimon Peres (Note: Replaced by Wizman Shiry on 17 January 2006 when he resigned to join Kadima) • Matan Vilnai • Avraham Burg (Note: Replaced by Raleb Majadele on 28 June 2004) • Dalia Itzik (Note: Replaced by Avi Yehezkel on 17 January 2006 when she resigned to join Kadima) • Ophir Pines-Paz • Efraim Sneh • Yuli Tamir • Isaac Herzog • Haim Ramon (Note: Replaced by Efi Oshaya on 18 January 2006 when he resigned to join Kadima) • Danny Yatom • Eitan Cabel • Avraham Shochat • Colette Avital • Shalom Simhon • Orit Noked • Eli Ben-Menachem • Amir Peretz (Note: One Nation merged into Labor) • Ilana Cohen
Labor–Meimad (21)	Meimad (1)	Michael Melchior
Kadima (14)		Ariel Sharon • Tzachi Hanegbi (Note: Replaced by Pnina Rosenblum of Likud on 10 December 2005) • Gideon Ezra • Tzipi Livni • Meir Sheetrit • Ruhama Avraham • Majalli Wahabi • Yaakov Edri • Eli Aflalo • Roni Bar-On • Ehud Olmert • Ze'ev Boim • Avraham Hirschson • David Tal (Note: Left One Nation to form Noy before joining Kadima)
Shas (11)		Eli Yishai • Shlomo Benizri • Nissim Dahan • Amnon Cohen • Yitzhak Cohen • David Azulai • Meshulam Nahari • Yitzhak Vaknin • Yair Peretz (Note: Replaced by Ofer Hugi on 25 March 2006) • Nissim Ze'ev • Ya'akov Margi
Hetz (8)		Tommy Lapid • Avraham Poraz • Victor Brailovsky • Ilan Shalgi • Meli Polishook-Bloch • Reshef Hen • Roni Brizon • Eti Livni •
Meretz (6)		Yossi Sarid • Haim Oron • Ran Cohen • Zehava Gal-On • Roman Bronfman • Avshalom Vilan
United Torah Judaism (5)	Degel HaTorah (3)	Avraham Ravitz • Moshe Gafni • Yisrael Eichler (Note: Replaced by Shmuel Halpert on 23 February 2005)
United Torah Judaism (5)	Agudat Yisrael (2)	Ya'akov Litzman • Meir Porush
Mafdal (4)		Zevulun Orlev • Shaul Yahalom • Gila Finkelstein • Nissan Slomiansky
National Union (4)	Moledet (2)	Binyamin Elon, Aryeh Eldad
National Union (4)	Tkuma (2)	Zvi Hendel, Uri Ariel
Yisrael Beiteinu (3)		Avigdor Lieberman (Note: Replaced by Eliezer Cohen on 26 March 2003) • Yuri Stern • Yigal Yasinov (Note: Left Shinui and joined Yisrael Beiteinu during term)
Shinui (3)		Yehudit Naot (Note: Replaced by Erela Golan on 16 December 2004) • Ehud Rassabi • Ilan Leibovitch
Balad (3)		Azmi Bishara • Jamal Zahalka • Wasil Taha
Ahi (2)		Effi Eitam • Yitzhak Levy
National Home (2)		Hemi Doron • Eliezer Sandberg
Hadash (2)		Mohammad Barakeh • Issam Makhoul
Ra'am (2)		Abdulmalik Dehamshe • Taleb el-Sana
Ta'al (1)		Ahmad Tibi
Tzalash (1)		Yosef Paritzky
Independent (1)		Michael Nudelman (Note: Left Yisrael Beiteinu and became independent, then was placed on Kadima's party list for the next election)

=== Replacements ===
MK	Replaced	Date	Party	Notes
Eliezer Cohen	Avigdor Lieberman	26 March 2003	National Union	Yisrael Beiteinu left the Union on 1 February
Raleb Majadele	Avraham Burg	28 June 2004	Labor Party-Meimad	
Erela Golan	Yehudit Naot	16 December 2004	Shinui	Left party to join the Secular Faction on 26 January 2006
Shmuel Halpert	Yisrael Eichler	23 February 2005	Agudat Yisrael	
Salah Tarif	Amram Mitzna	23 February 2005	Labor Party-Meimad	Replaced by Ronen Tzur on 22 January 2006
Pnina Rosenblum	Tzachi Hanegbi	10 December 2005	Likud	
David Mena	Omri Sharon	5 January 2006	Likud	
Sofa Landver	Avraham Shochat	11 January 2006	Labor Party-Meimad	Replaced by Orna Angel on 8 February 2006
Wizman Shiry	Shimon Peres	17 January 2006	Labor Party-Meimad	
Avi Yehezkel	Dalia Itzik	17 January 2006	Labor Party-Meimad	Replaced by Dani Koren on 28 January 2006
Efi Oshaya	Haim Ramon	18 January 2006	Labor Party-Meimad	Replaced by Tova Ilan on 21 January 2006
Tova Ilan	Efi Oshaya	21 January 2006	Labor Party-Meimad	
Ronen Tzur	Salah Tarif	22 January 2006	Labor Party-Meimad	
Dani Koren	Avi Yehezkel	28 January 2006	Labor Party-Meimad	
Esterina Tartman	Michael Nudelman	8 February 2006	Yisrael Beiteinu	
Orna Angel	Sofa Landver	8 February 2006	Labor Party-Meimad	Replaced by Neta Dobrin on 15 February 2006
Neta Dobrin	Orna Angel	15 February 2006	Labor Party-Meimad	
Ofer Hugi	Yair Peretz	25 March 2006	Shas	
