= Livni =

Livni is an Israeli surname and it may refer to:

- Eitan Livni (1919–1991) Zionist activist, Irgun commander and Israeli politician
  - Tzipi Livni (born 1958) Israeli foreign minister, politician, and daughter of Eitan Livni
- Eti Livni (born 1948) Israeli politician
- Yitzhak Livni (1934–2017), Israeli media figure and writer
