= HaTzeirim =

HaTzeirim הצעירים
- Leader: Eliezer Sandberg
- Founded: 23 March 1999
- Dissolved: 29 March 1999
- Split from: Center Party
- Merged into: Shinui
- Most MKs: 1 (1999)
- Fewest MKs: 1 (1999)

HaTzeirim (Hebrew: הצעירים, lit. 'The Youth') was a short-lived political faction in Israel in the late 1990s.

== Background ==
The faction was formed on 23 March 1999, during the 14th Knesset, when Center Party MK Eliezer Sandberg broke away from his party and established a single-member parliamentary group.

However, the faction was short-lived, as a week after its creation, Sandberg joined the Shinui group. He was later part of a group that broke away to form Secular Faction and then National Home, which merged into Likud.
