= Uzi Baram =

Israeli former politician

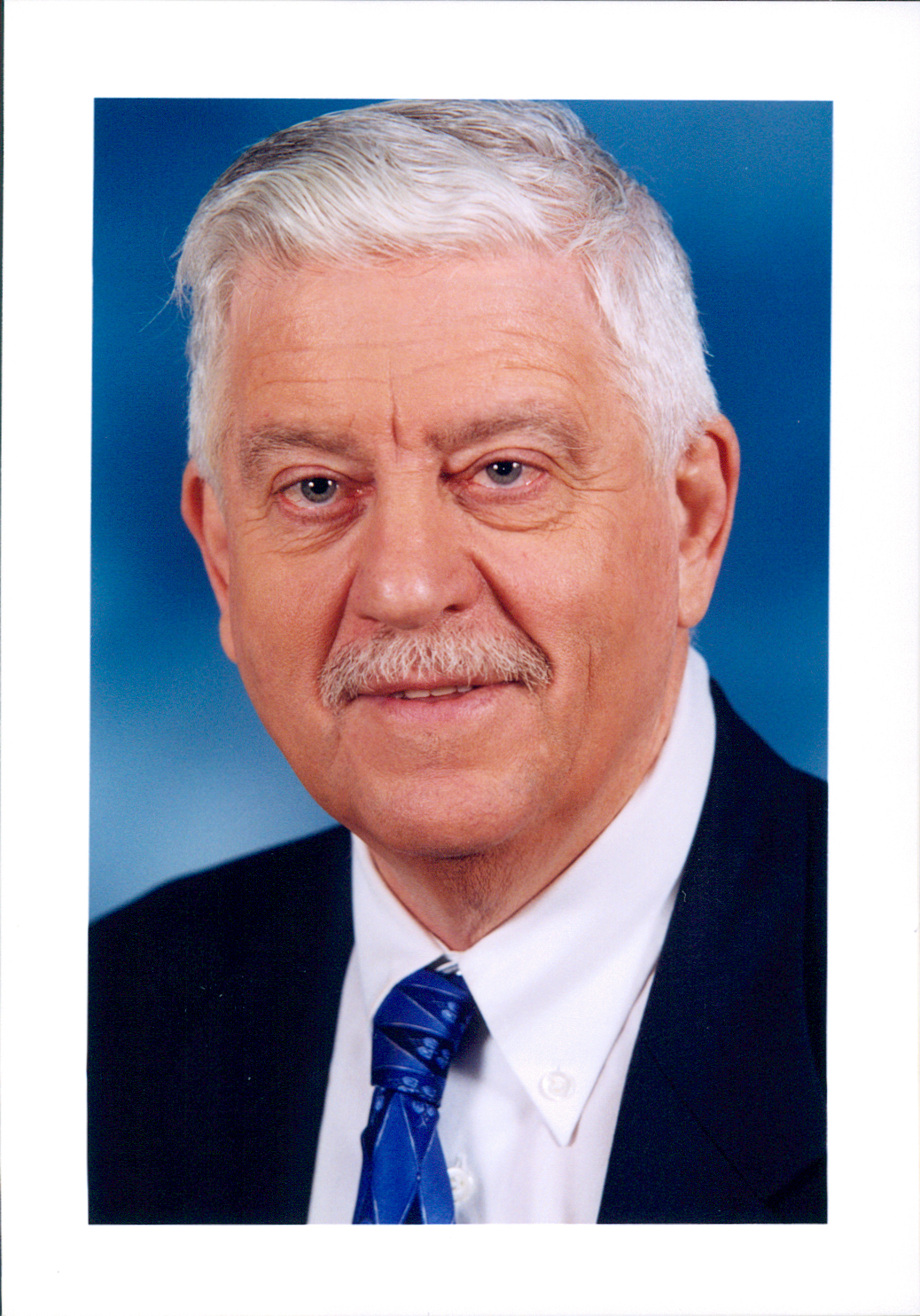
- Baram during his time in the Knesset

Ministerial roles
- 1992–1996: Minister of Tourism
- 1995: Minister of Internal Affairs

Faction represented in the Knesset
- 1977–1991: Alignment
- 1991-1999: Labor Party
- 1999-2001: One Israel

Personal details
- Born: 6 April 1937 (age 89) Jerusalem, Mandatory Palestine

Uzi Baram (Hebrew: עוזי ברעם; born 6 April 1937) is an Israeli former politician who served as a member of the Knesset between 1977 and 2001, and was Minister of Tourism and Minister of Internal Affairs in the 1990s.

== Biography ==
Baram was born in Jerusalem during the Mandate era. His father, Moshe Baram, born in Zdolbuniv in the Russian Empire (today in Ukraine) in 1911, served as Minister of Labour and Minister of Welfare, and was a Knesset member for Mapai and the Alignment. His mother, Grazia, was born in Aleppo, Syria. Baram grew up in Jerusalem's Nahalat Ahim neighborhood. He studied in Beit Hinuch high school in Jerusalem. Baram earned a BA in political science and sociology from the Hebrew University of Jerusalem. During his studies, he was chairman of the Students Union.

Baram was elected to the Knesset in 1977 on the Alignment list, an election in which his father lost his seat. Re-elected in 1981, 1984, 1988 and 1992 (by which time the Alignment had become the Labor Party, he was appointed Minister of Tourism in Yitzhak Rabin's government in July 1992. In February 1995 he also became Minister of Internal Affairs, serving until June that year when David Libai was appointed to the post. When Shimon Peres formed a new government following Rabin's assassination, he remained Minister of Tourism.

Although he retained his seat in the 1996 elections, Likud formed the government and Baram lost his place in the cabinet. He was re-elected in 1999 on the One Israel list (an alliance of the Labor Party, Gesher and Meimad), but resigned from the Knesset in February 2001, and was replaced by Efi Oshaya.

His son is author Nir Baram.
