= Tova Ilan =

Israeli educator and politician (1929–2019)

Faction represented in the Knesset
- 2006: Meimad

Personal details
- Born: 2 June 1929 Austria
- Died: 18 March 2019 (aged 89) Ein Tzurim, Israel

Tova Ilan (Hebrew: טובה אילן; 2 June 1929 – 18 March 2019) was an Israeli educator and politician. She briefly served as a member of the Knesset for Meimad between January and April 2006.

== Biography ==
Born in Austria, Ilan emigrated to Israel and was involved in the Haganah. She joined kibbutz Ein Tzurim in 1951, and from 1951 until 1960, she worked with Youth Aliyah. From 1961 until 1972, she was the headmistress of Shafir Regional high school. In 1987, she established the Yaakov Herzog Centre for Jewish Studies in Ein Tzurim, and was its director until 2001, and is now its president.

For the 2003 elections, she was placed 27th on the joined Labor Party-Meimad list (the second placed Meimad candidate after party leader Michael Melchior), but missed out on a seat when the alliance won only 19 seats. However, she entered the Knesset on 21 January 2006 as a replacement for Efi Oshaya (who had entered the Knesset three days previously as a replacement for Haim Ramon, who had left the party to join Kadima). Because the Knesset was already in recess prior to the next elections, she chose not to take her salary, and donated it to young olim.

She was not included on the party's list for the March 2006 elections, and subsequently lost her seat.
