= Beit Hinuch =

Beit Hinuch (Ironi Gimel Highschool)
- בית חינוך (תיכון עירוני ג')
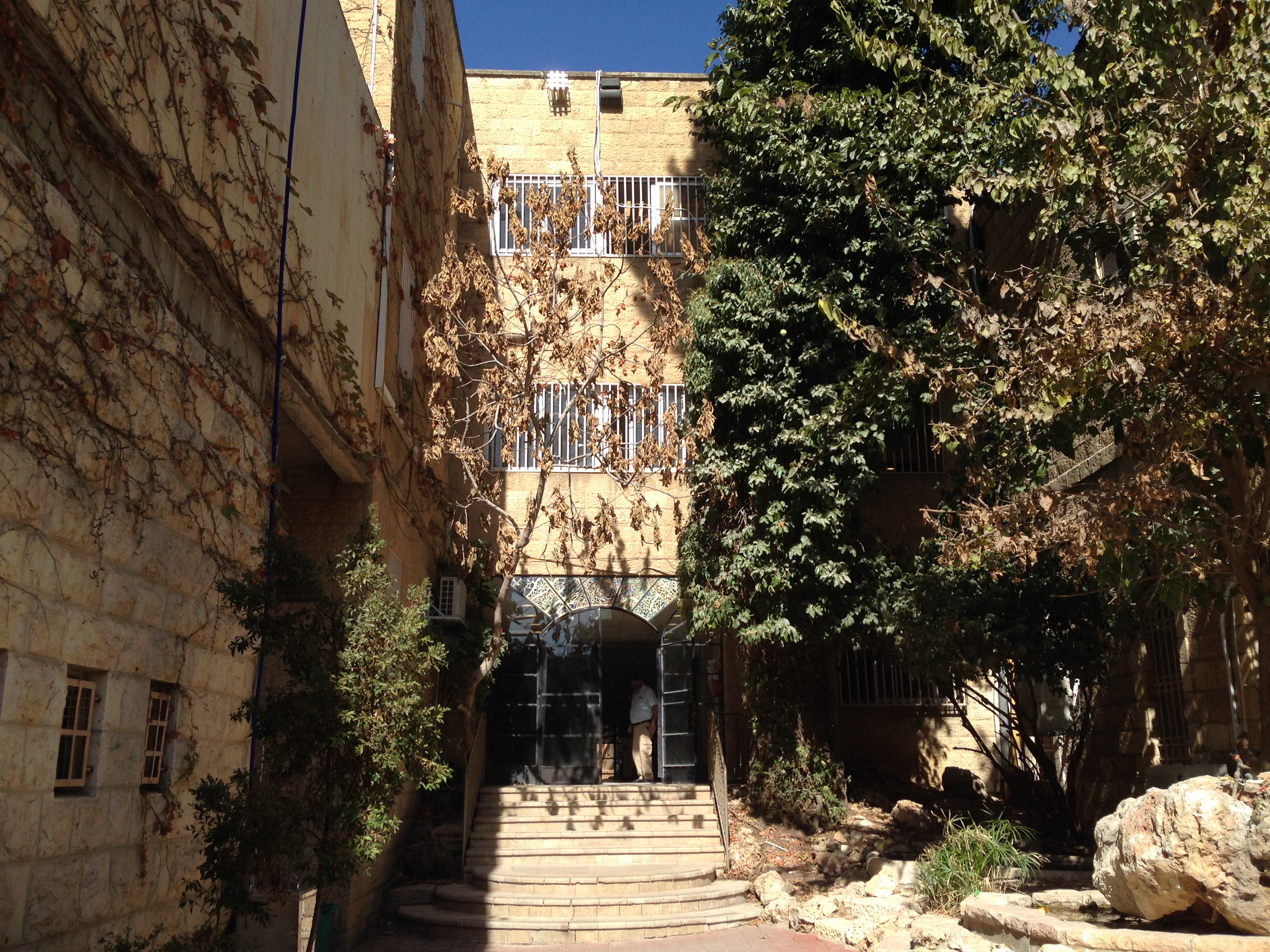

Location
- 22 Emek Refaim street, Jerusalem; Israel
- Coordinates: 31.76515°N 35.220372°E

Information
- Established: 1939
- Principal: Ayelet Golomb Planer, Adv.
- Staff: 50
- Age range: 13-18
- Language: Hebrew
- Website: beitchinuch.jlm.org.il

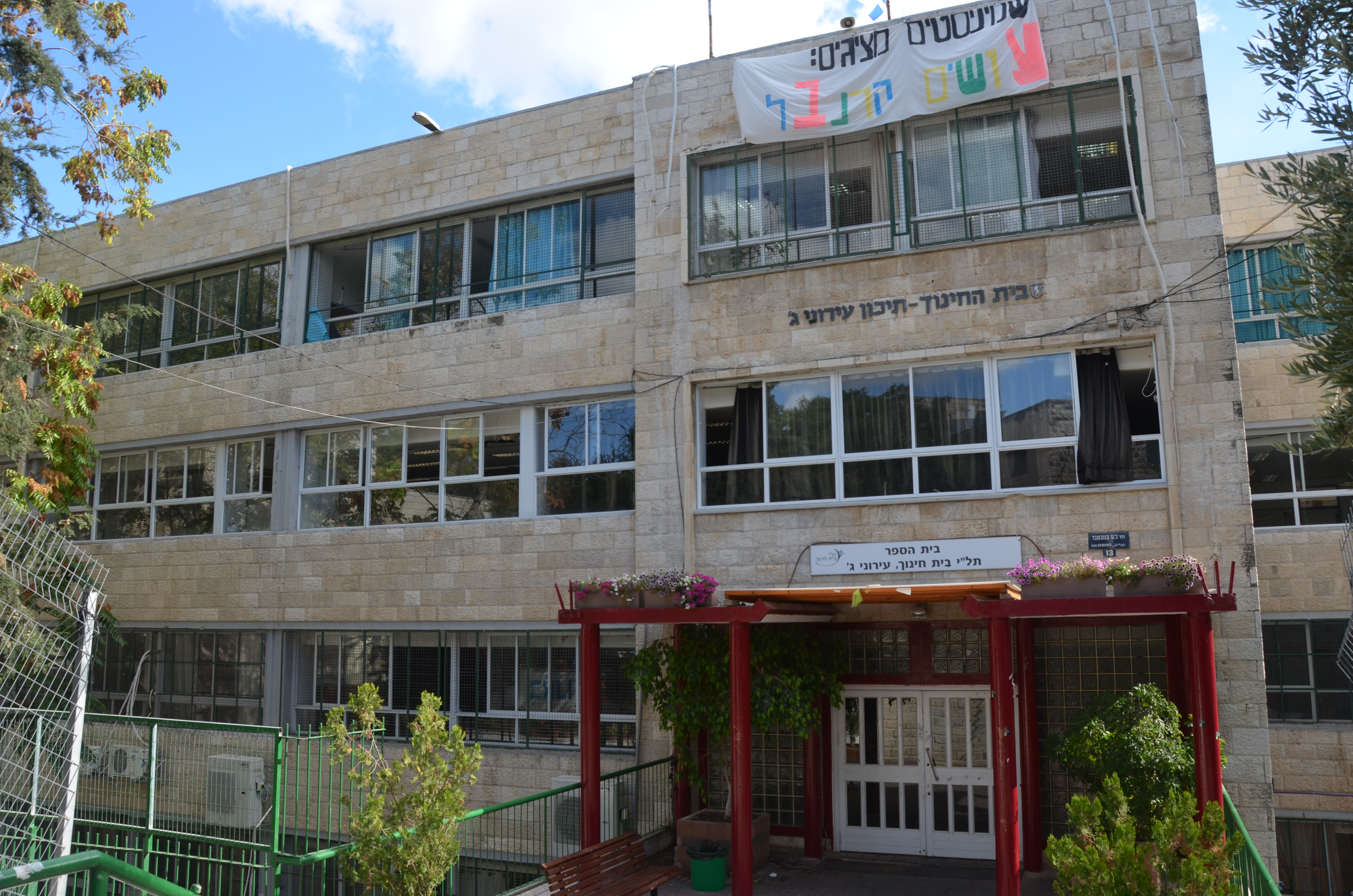
The school in its former location, in Katamon.

Beit Hinuch (Hebrew: בית חינוך) is a High school in the German Colony neighbourhood in Jerusalem.

== History ==
=== 20th century ===
Beit Hinuch was founded in 1939. It was the third Hebrew school - Ironi Gimmel - to be established in Jerusalem in modern times (after Evelina de Rothschild School - Ironi Aleph, 1st Municipal High School, and Gymnasia Rehavia - Ironi Bet, 2nd Municipal High School).

The school was founded by the Histadrut. In 1959, the operation of the school was taken over by the Municipality of Jerusalem. It was originally located on Mesilat Yesharim street, near the city center. In the 1960s, as the number of students grew, the school moved to a new location on Kaf-Tet beNovember street, in Jerusalem's Katamon neighbourhood.

In 1987 the school underwent a major renovation project with the help of the Jerusalem Foundation, carrying out facade and landscaping improvements, creating a technology center, computer laboratory and vocational workshops. In 2004, again with the help of the Jerusalem foundation, the school upgraded the computer infrastructure and supported curriculum development and an after school learning center.

In 1994, the New York Times characterized the students of Beit Hinuch as "a mixture of rich and poor, secular and traditionally religious, European and North African, open-minded and insular, outgoing and defensive."

=== 21st century ===
In 2006, the school initiated a project called "Fairness in Sports" using sports heroes to teach good values. This led to the inauguration of 'The Sports Experience,' a program implemented in over 50 Jerusalem schools to teach respect, tolerance and proper behavior through sports. The opening event took place at Beit Hinuch. It was attended by Arkady Gaydamak, then owner of the Beitar Jerusalem F.C. soccer team, as well as members of the team.

Since 2020, the School Principal has been Ayelet Golomb-Planer, a former lawyer.

In 2021 the school moved to a new location, in Emek Refaim street in the German Colony neighbourhood of Jerusalem, switching places with the Antroposophic school "Adam". Mayor of Jerusalem Moshe Lion and deputy mayor Hagit Moshe attended the inauguration ceremony in the school.

== Awards and recognition ==
The school has won awards for excellence:

- In 2013 the school won the Education Award of the City of Jerusalem (granted by Municipality of Jerusalem) for Academic, social and educational excellence.
- In 2022 the school won the Excellent School Award granted by the Ministry of Education of Israel.

== Notable alumni ==
- Yossi Sarid - Former minister and member of the Knesset
- Oded Galor - Economist, Professor of Economics in Brown University, founder of Unified growth theory
- Uzi Baram - Former minister and member of the Knesset
- Sivan Klein - Miss Israel 2003, model and TV presenter
- Dana Berger - Singer
- Eliezer Schweid - Israel Prize laureate, Professor of Jewish Philosophy at The Hebrew University of Jerusalem
- Beverly Barkat - Visual artist
- Nechemya Cohen - The most decorated soldier in Israel Defense Forces (IDF)
- Papi Turgeman - Basketball player
- Moshe Harif - Former member of the Knesset
- Zvi Ben-Avraham - Head of Israel Geological Society
- Jonathan Yavin - Author and journalist
- Hila Plitmann - Opera singer awarded the Grammy Award for Best Classical Vocal Performance
- Yosef Shapira - Former judge, served as the State Comptroller of Israel
- Noam Slonim - Computer scientist
- Shlomo Ydov (Heb) (Ger) - Singer and composer awarded the Ophir Award for best original music
- Dina Prialnik (Heb) (Rom) - Former vice president of the International Astronomical Union
- Haim Nagid (Heb) (Rom) - Writer and poet
- Yoav Ginay (Heb) (Tur) - Radio and TV host, Songwriter
- Dan Orin (Heb) - Diplomat, served as Israel's ambassador in North Macedonia
- Eitan Raf (Heb) - Former Accountant general of Israel and chairman of Bank Leumi
- Uri Ofer (Heb) - Former CEO of Cameri Theater
- Eliad Shraga (Heb) - Founder and chairman of the Movement for Quality Government in Israel
- Sharon Dotan (Heb) - Writer
- Ariel Margalit (Heb) - Journalist
- Haim Baram (Heb) - Journalist and columnist, Haaretz
- Aliza Amir-Zohar (Heb) - Former Secretary General of HaKibutz HaArtzi, union of Hashomer Hatzair Kibutzim
- Ora Ahimeir (Heb) - Manager General of the Jerusalem Institute, Yakirat Yerushalayim
- Natan Shahar (Heb) - Musicologist, Orchestra conductor and composer
- Zvi Fridlender (Heb) - Founder and head of Internal medicine ward, Hadassah Medical Center
- Moshe Mossek (Heb) - Historian, writer, head of Israel State Archives
- Ron Harris (Heb) - Dean at the Faculty of Law in Tel-Aviv University
- Yael Ronen (Heb) - Associate Professor of Law, Academic Center for Law and Science

== See also ==
- Education in Israel
