= Ze'ev Boim =

Israeli politician

- זאב בוים
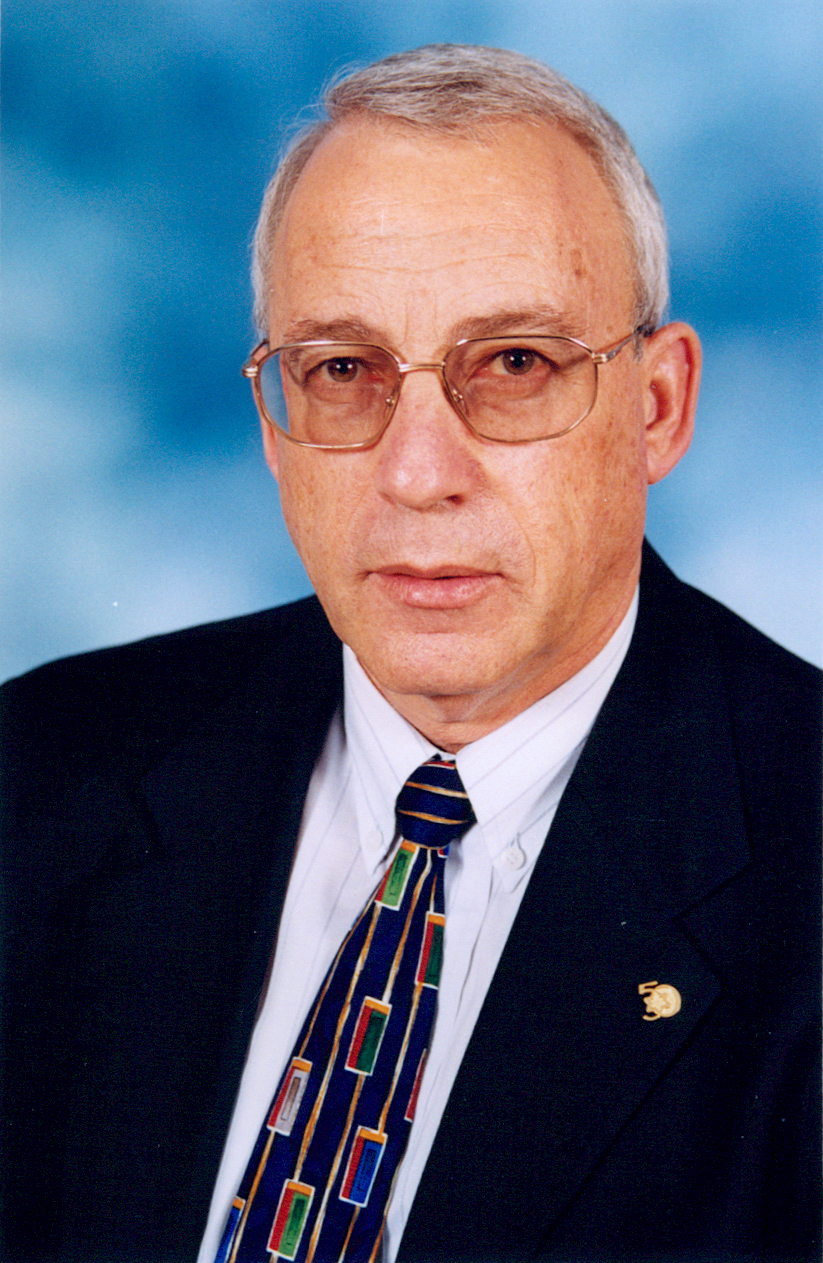

Ministerial roles
- 2006: Minister of Housing & Construction
- 2006: Minister of Agriculture
- 2006–2007: Minister of Immigrant Absorption
- 2007–2009: Minister of Housing & Construction

Faction represented in the Knesset
- 1996–2005: Likud
- 2005–2011: Kadima

Personal details
- Born: 30 April 1943 Jerusalem, Mandatory Palestine
- Died: 18 March 2011 (aged 67) Milwaukee, United States

Ze'ev Boim (Hebrew: זאב בוים; 30 April 1943 – 18 March 2011) was an Israeli politician. He was the mayor of Kiryat Gat before becoming a Knesset member for Likud and later Kadima. Boim was Minister of Agriculture and Rural Development, Minister of Housing and Construction, and Minister of Immigrant Absorption.

== Biography ==
Ze'ev Boim was born in Jerusalem during the British Mandate era. He served as a company commander in the Israel Defense Forces Armored Corps. He earned a BA in History and Hebrew literature from the Hebrew University of Jerusalem.

Boim was the principal of the Rogozin comprehensive high school in Kiryat Gat.

He served as mayor of Kiryat Gat, as well as Chairman of the Municipal Environmental Quality Association of Ashkelon District; chairman of the board of directors of the Economic Company of Kiryat Gat; and chairman of the Directorate of the Inter-Regional Industrial Park of Kiryat Gat and Hevel Lakhish.

Boim was married, with four children. His son Amir died while serving in the IDF. Boim died of cancer in March 2011 at Froedtert Hospital in Milwaukee.

== Political career ==
In 1996, Boim was elected to the Knesset on the Likud list, serving as the party's whip, head of the Negev Lobby, and head of the Knesset Delegation to the Annual Dialogue between Israel and the European Parliament during his first term. After being re-elected in 1999, he served as coalition and Likud faction chairman.

He was re-elected again in 2003, and served as Deputy Minister of Defense from March 2003 until January 2006. In 2005, he defected to the new Kadima party, while still retaining his ministerial position. In January 2006, he became Minister of Housing and Construction, and Minister of Agriculture and Rural Development, serving in both positions until May. He was re-elected in 2006, and was then appointed Minister of Immigrant Absorption, before returning to the Housing and Construction portfolio in 2007. Placed sixth on Kadima's list, he retained his seat in the 2009 elections.

== Controversy ==
In 2004, responding to a question about terrorism and Islamic political violence, Boim remarked: "What is it about Islam as a whole, and the Palestinians in particular? Is it some form of cultural deprivation? Is it some genetic defect? There is something that defies explanation in this continued murderousness." He was criticized for this statement by many members of the government, among them Meimad leader MK Rabbi Michael Melchior, who said that Boim's comment was racist and against the tenets of Judaism. Boim later apologized for his remarks, saying he was speaking after a recent Palestinian attack and was overwhelmed by the scope of the bloodshed at the time.
