= Yitzhak Coren =

Israeli politician (1911–1994)

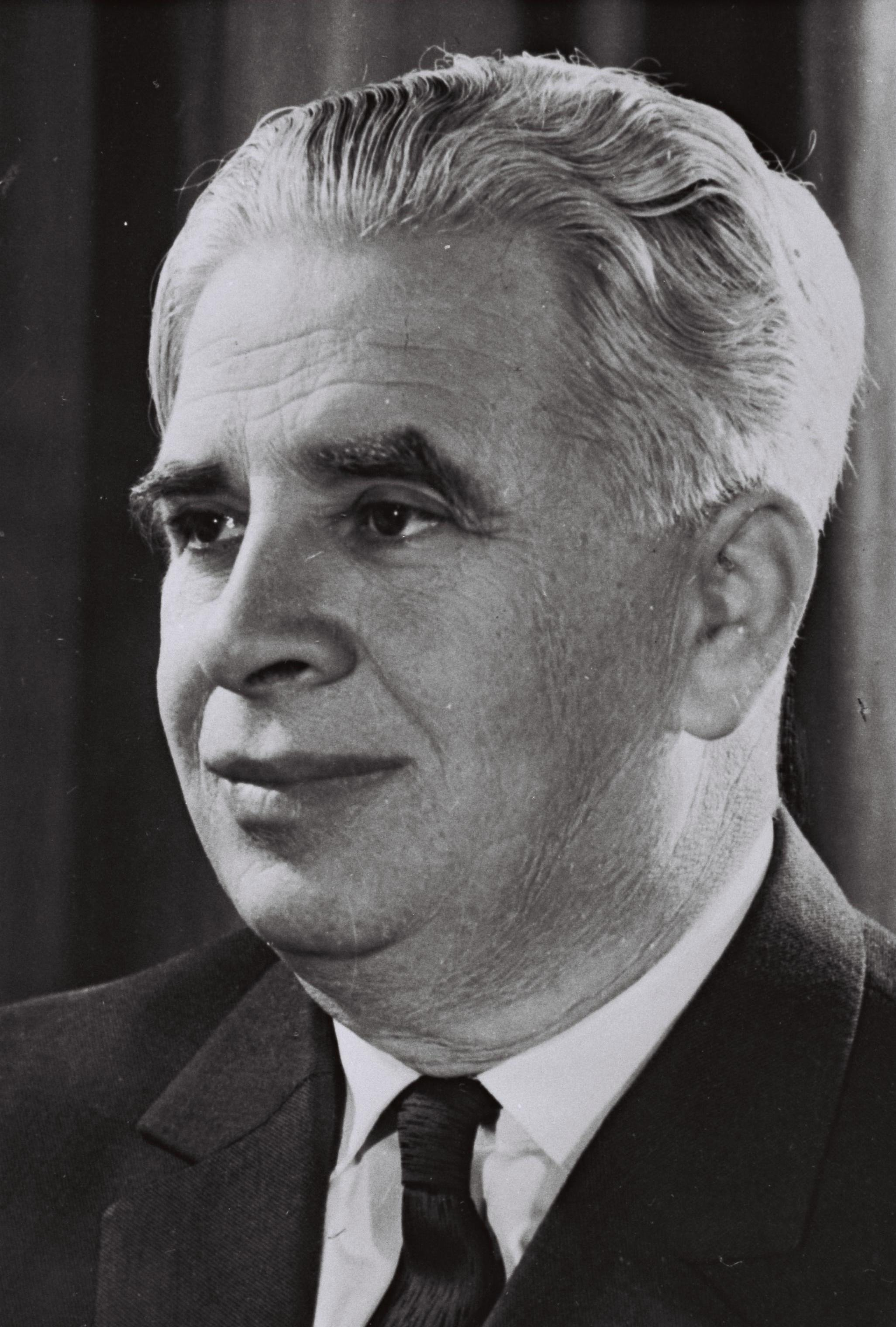
- Coren in 1969

Faction represented in the Knesset
- 1959–1965: Mapai
- 1969–1974: Alignment

Personal details
- Born: 11 March 1911 Chişinău, Russian Empire
- Died: 22 June 1994 (aged 83)

Yitzhak Coren (Hebrew: יצחק קורן; 11 March 1911 – 22 June 1994) was an Israeli politician who served as a member of the Knesset for Mapai and the Alignment.

== Biography ==
Born in Chişinău in the Russian Empire (now in Moldova), Coren studied law at university and was certified as a lawyer. Whilst a student he was amongst the leadership of the Romanian Zionists Student Association. He served as secretary of Tze'irei Zion and was a member of the Zionist Federation of Bessarabia's presidium, editing their Yiddish language newspaper.

In 1940 he emigrated to Mandatory Palestine and became a member of the Haganah. Between 1941 and 1943 he worked as director of the Department of Information and Organization of the Histadrut's Supply Centre, before serving as secretary of the Moshavim Movement between 1944 and 1961. In 1949 he was amongst the founders of the "From Ma'abarot to Village" settlement project

In 1959 Coren was elected to the Knesset on the Mapai list. He retained his seat in the 1961 elections and was appointed Deputy Minister of Finance in the tenth government on 30 May 1956, serving until the government left office on 26 June the following year. He lost his seat in 1965, but returned to the Knesset on the Alignment list (an alliance of the Labor Party (formed by a merger of Mapai, Ahdut HaAvoda and Rafi) and Mapam) following the 1969 elections, but lost his seat again in 1973. Between 1964 and 1979 he served as secretary of the World Union of Labor Zionists.

Coren died in 1994. His daughter Ruth married politician Moshe Nissim, who held several ministerial portfolios in the 1980s and early 1990s, whilst his son Dani was briefly an MK for the Labor Party in 2006.
