= Tzalash =

Tzalash צל״ש
- Leader: Yosef Paritzky
- Founder: Yosef Paritzky
- Founded: July 2004
- Split from: Shinui
- Ideology: Liberalism; Secularism
- Most MKs: 1 (2004)

Tzalash (Hebrew: צל״ש, an acronym for Tziyonut Liberaliyut Shivyon, (Hebrew: ציונות ליברליות שוויון) lit. Zionism Liberalism Equality) was a one-man political party in Israel.

== Background ==
Tzalash was formed after MK and Infrastructure Minister Yosef Paritzky was expelled from Shinui in July 2004 after he had been caught attempting to shame Shinui's deputy leader Avraham Poraz; he had hired a private investigator to look into Poraz's affairs and "drop him in the dirt." Paritzky's actions were investigated by the police, but charges were not brought.

Shinui attempted to have Paritzky expelled from the Knesset and replace him with another Shinui MK. However, the Knesset House Committee allowed him to retain his seat. Paritzky then announced that he was forming his own party and would run in the 2006 elections, saying his goal was for Shinui "not to attain the minimum number of votes needed to get into the Knesset." Although it was possible for the faction to receive 600,000 shekels in electoral funding, Tzalash did not participate in the 2006 elections.

Despite Tzalash's demise, two of Paritzky's goals were realised; Poraz was defeated in Shinui's primary elections in January 2006, with Paritzky saying Poraz and party leader Tommy Lapid "should have been sent home long ago". In addition, in the elections, Poraz's new party, Hetz, and Shinui both failed to win any seats.

In 2018 the party's registration was used to create the New Right, a breakaway from the Jewish Home.
