= Edna Solodar =

Israeli politician (1930–2024)

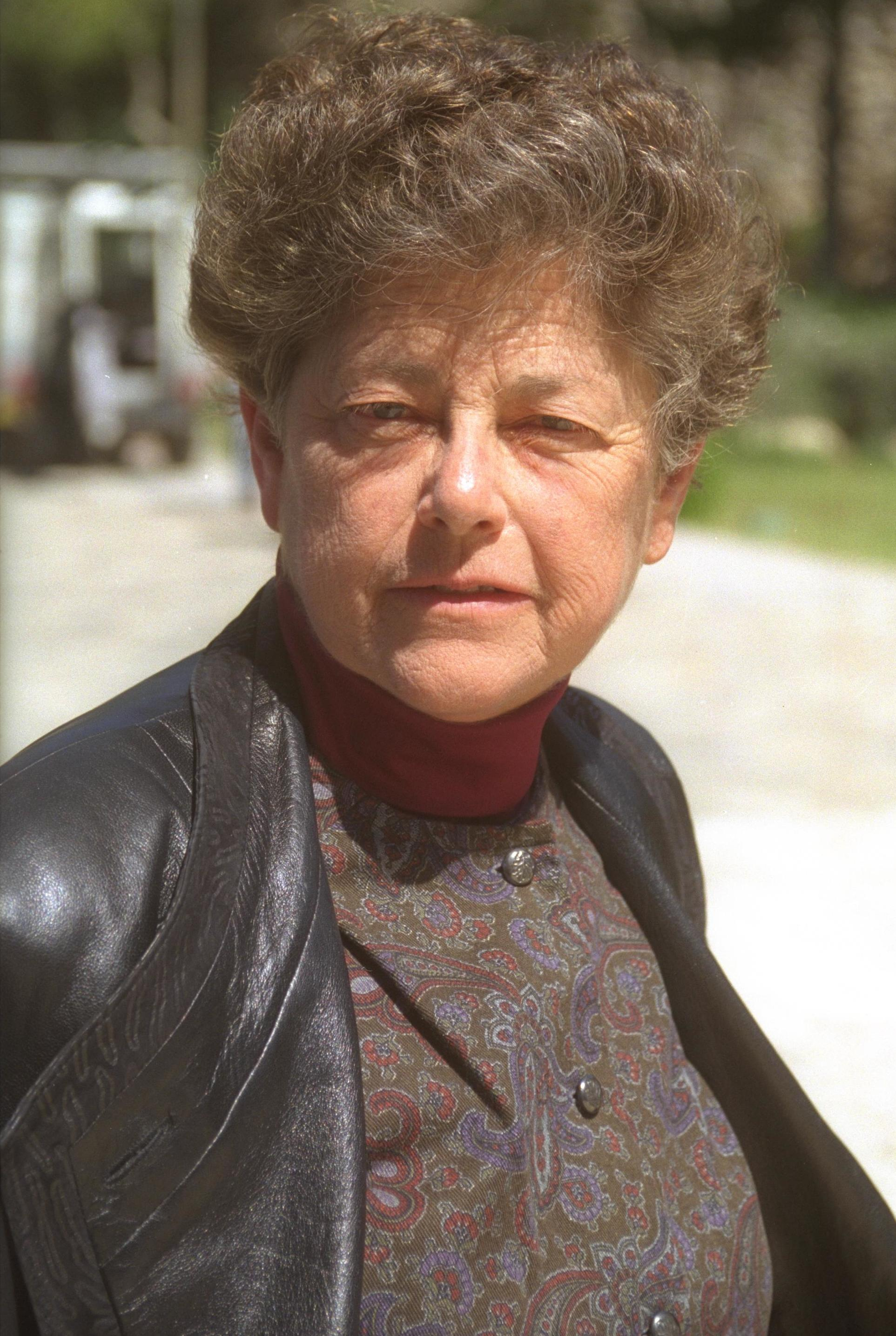
- Solodar in 1990

Faction represented in the Knesset
- 1982–1991: Alignment
- 1991–1992: Labor Party

Personal details
- Born: 15 March 1930 Ashdot Ya'akov, Mandatory Palestine
- Died: 9 April 2024 (aged 94) Gesher, Israel

Edna Solodar (Hebrew: עדנה סולודר; 15 March 1930 – 9 April 2024) was an Israeli politician who served as a member of the Knesset for the Alignment and Labor Party between 1982 and 1992. She was the recipient of the 2024 Israel Prize for Lifetime Achievement.

== Biography ==
Born in Ashdot Ya'akov during the Mandate era, Solodar later moved to kibbutz Gesher. She was educated at the kibbutz's high school and went on to attend the Israel Conservatory and Academy of Music in Tel Aviv.

Solodar worked as a music teacher in kibbutzim, Beit She'an and the Jordan Valley. From 1967 until 1971 and again from 1978 until 1980, she was secretary of kibbutz Gesher, and also served as the Internal Affairs secretary of the Kibbutz HaMeuhad movement between 1972 and 1982.

For the 1981 Knesset elections she was placed on the Alignment list. Although she failed to win a seat, she entered the Knesset on 16 January the following year as a replacement for Moshe Harif, another kibbutz activist who had been killed in a traffic collision. She was re-elected in 1984 and 1988, but lost her seat in the 1992 elections.

Between 1992 and 1998 she served as chairwoman of the United Kibbutz Movement.

Solodar died on 9 April 2024 at the age of 94.

A day after her death, her family was informed that she had won the 2024 Israel Prize for Lifetime Achievement.
