= Nechemya Cohen =

Israeli military officer

Nechemiah Cohen
- נחמיה כהן
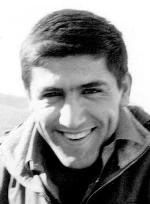
- Born: April 30, 1943; Jerusalem, Mandatory Palestine
- Died: June 5, 1967 (aged 24)
- Military career
- Allegiance: Israel Defense Forces
- Rank: Captain
- Unit: Sayeret Matkal
- Conflicts: Six-Day War
- Awards: Medal of Distinguished Service

Nechemiah Cohen (Hebrew: נחמיה כהן; April 30, 1943 – June 5, 1967) was an Israeli military officer. He was most decorated soldier in the history of the Israel Defense Forces (IDF). He shares this honour with close friend and former prime minister Ehud Barak, and Major Amitai Hason. He received five decorations – one Medal of Distinguished Service and four Chief Of Staff Citations.

Cohen was born in Jerusalem to Shalom and Shoshana, who made Aliyah from Turkey. He studied in the elementary school in Bet HaKerem neighbourhood of Jerusalem and later attended Beit Hinuch high school in the city. Following his graduation, he enlisted to the IDF, where he served in Sayeret Matkal.

Cohen was killed in combat near the City of Gaza on June 5, 1967, the first day of the Six-Day War, at the age of 24.

His older brother Eliezer Cohen served as a fighter pilot and was a member of the Knesset.
