= Neta Dobrin =

Israeli politician

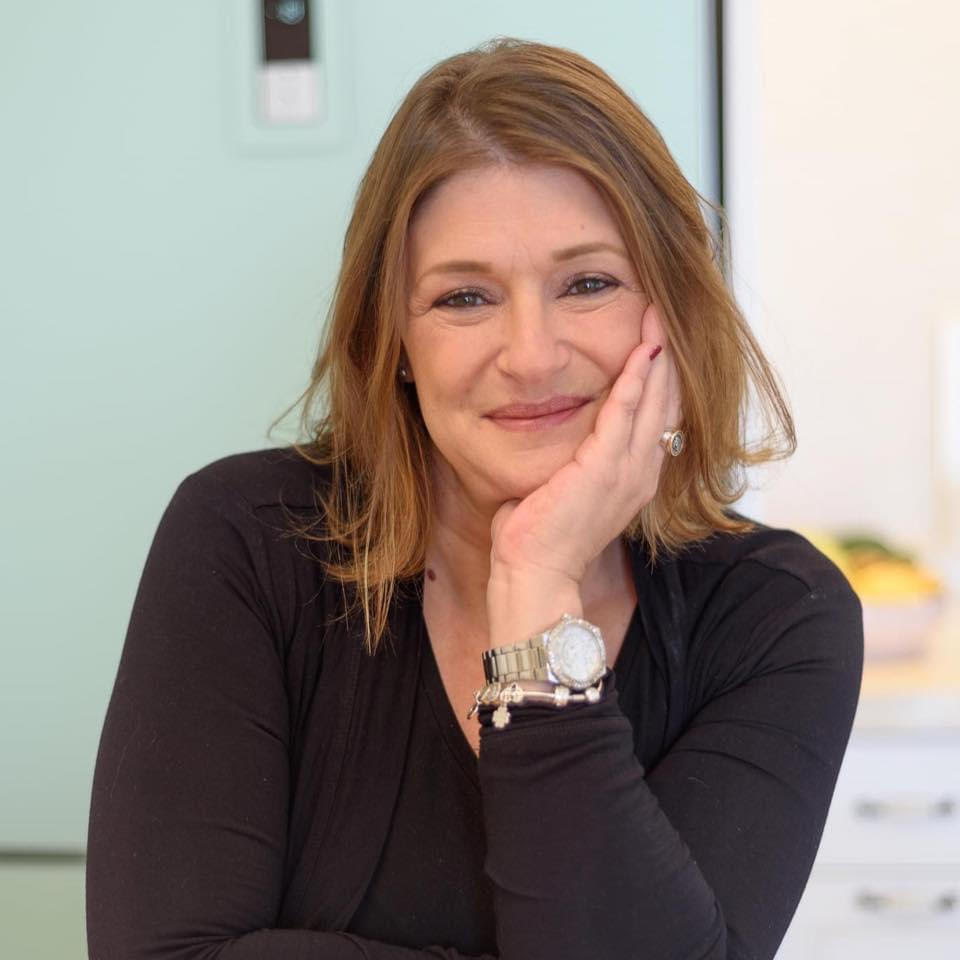
- Dobrin in 2021

Faction represented in the Knesset
- 2006: Labor Party

Personal details
- Born: 27 October 1975 (age 50) Safed, Israel

Neta Dobrin (Hebrew: נטע דוברין; born 27 October 1975) is an Israeli former politician who briefly served as a member of the Knesset for the Labor Party between February and April 2006.

== Early life and education ==
Born in Safed, Dobrin gained a BA in education, sociology and anthropology at the University of Haifa, before studying for an MBA with the Israeli branch of the University of Derby. She also completed the first year of law studies at Sha'arei Mishpat College. Whilst at the University of Haifa, she was the representative for sociology students.

== Career ==
In 1998 she was elected onto Haifa city council, and chaired its committee for youth between 1998 and 2003, when she left the council. For the 2003 elections she was placed 32nd on the Labor Party's list, but missed out on a seat when the party won only 19 seats. However, she entered the Knesset on 15 February 2006 as a replacement for Orna Angel (who herself had only replaced Sofa Landver a week before). She lost her seat in the March 2006 elections.
