= Yitzhak Livni =

Israeli media figure and writer

- יצחק לבני
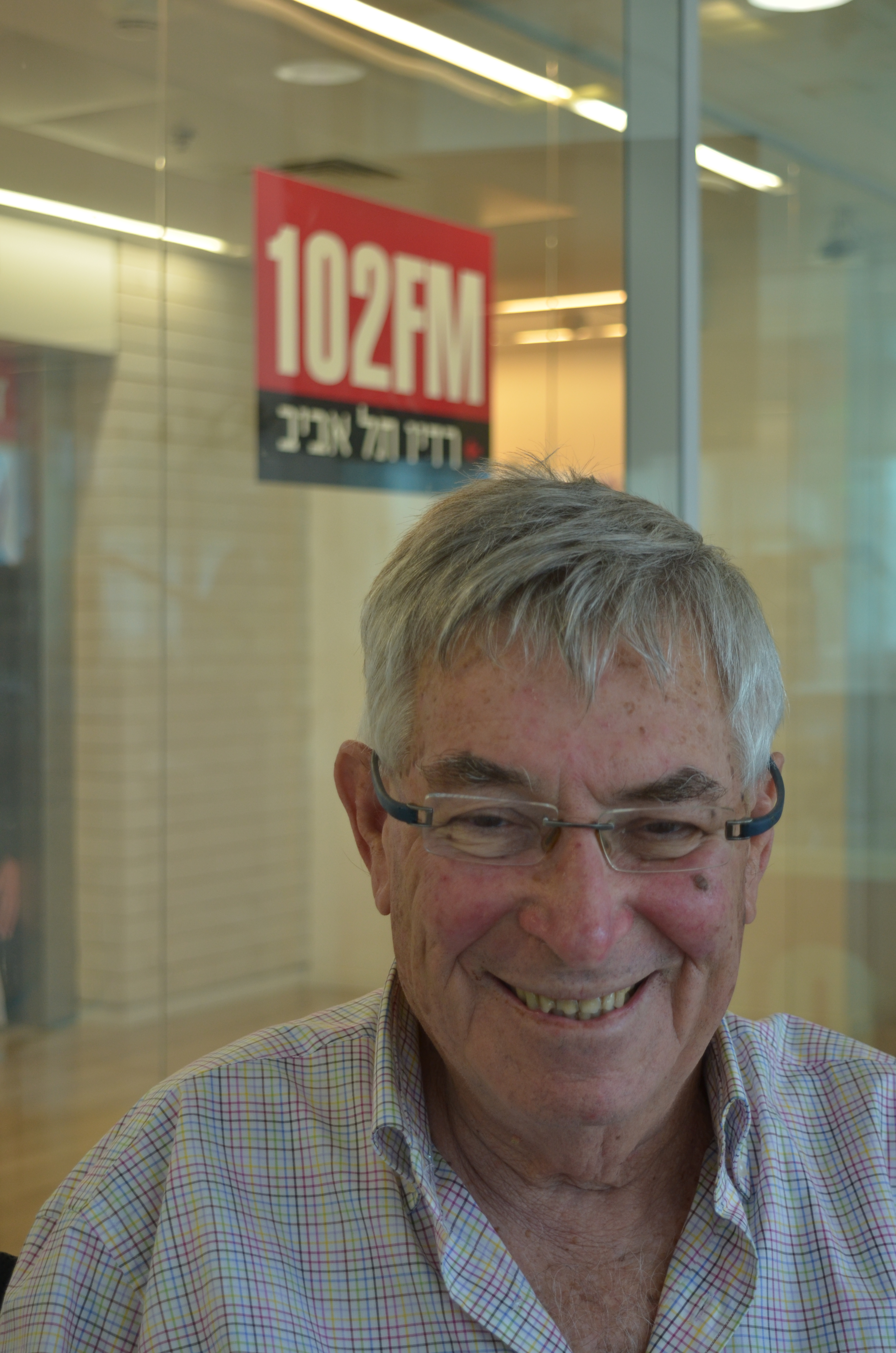
- Born: Yitzhak Livni; 17 October 1934; Łódź, Poland
- Died: 12 February 2017 (aged 82); Jerusalem, Israel
- Spouse: Eti Livni (3 children)

Yitzhak Livni (Hebrew: יצחק לבני; October 17, 1934 – February 12, 2017) was an Israeli media personality and writer. He served as editor of the magazines Bamahane Nahal (in the years 1956–1961) and Bamahane (1961–1971), the head of IDF's radio station Galatz (1968–1974), CEO of the Israel Broadcasting Authority (1974–1979), special advisor and later head of the steering committee for the experimental Channel 2 and then chairman of Channel 2 news company.

== Biography ==
=== Head of Galatz ===
Livni expanded the army radio station Galatz (short for "Galei Tzahal" - "IDF Waves") from a limited-hour broadcast to a 24-hour schedule, securing it's continued operation. He reorganized the station's programming and oversaw the early careers of numerous broadcasters who later went on to work throughout the broader Israeli media industry.

The direction and style first outlined by Livni still exist at the station to this day, given the obligatory variations and changes that have occurred over the years, which is a testament to the strength of the system Livni had put in place for the station. His conception was that a military radio station could have a variety of civilian-oriented, pluralistic, and diverse programs, as well as cultural commitment. in his period programs concerned with current events, social, and cultural issues were all introduced to the lineup, as well as documentaries, dramas, discussions, interviews, game shows, and pop music programs. The guiding principle was that there was no contradiction between maintaining quality broadcasting and cultural commitment and gaining in popularity and increasing the number of listeners.

Livni established the civilian news desk and extended current events journals which were broadcast several times a day (previously the programming schedule included only a military journal and a current events program). This was done while maintaining the station's independence, though it was a military station. He began the tradition of broadcasting "poet songs evening" programs (setting poems to music, including poems by Bialik, Nathan Zach, Yehuda Amichai and others) to bring written poetry closer to sung poetry. Following these evenings, the trend of setting poetry to music had become a common phenomenon in Israeli culture. Galatz became a unique station in the Israeli, as well as the global, media landscape. Already at the first stage of the changes led by Livni, the columnist Doron Rosenblum wrote in Davar:

"Galei Tzahal, who had hitherto been nothing but small ripples carrying the foam of pop songs, is gradually becoming a sea of high waves. From a small and unimportant station Galei Tzahal has become both gleeful and serious waves, who have formed a successful merger between the heavy wave and the light wave."

Going on to discuss Livni, Rosenblum writes:

"At every junction of media influence where he was found, he left a clear imprint of quality. As with some of his parallels in western countries, Livni managed to reinvent the media outlets he headed, to excite them with a spirit of creativity, and in retrospect to make them into landmarks of Israeli culture."

Prof. Menachem Mautner wrote about Livni's time at Galatz in a study published in the multidisciplinary journal Plilim in 2000, stating that:

"The person responsible for creating these mixtures more than anyone else is Yitzhak Livni (...) in his period the station underwent a series of revolutions which shaped its image for the dozens of years to follow".

=== IBA and Channel 2 ===
Livni served as CEO of the Israel Broadcasting Authority, the state's public radio and television network, for five years. In his period an emphasis was placed on broadcasting television shows produced in Israel (about 70% of programming) and on combining high quality and good viewership. This was opposed to the perception that high rating must be obtained by sinking to the lowest common denominator. The programming included current events magazines, drama, interviews, satire ( Nikui Rosh ("Head Cleaning")), and entertainment. The principles of public broadcasting were emphasized, and an independence from political pressures was maintained along with the freedom of expression. In radio broadcasting Livni initiated the establishment of "Reshet Gimel" for popular music, and at the same time extensive changes were made and the number of news and talk programs increased at "Reshet Bet".

Starting in 1987, and for a period of six years, Livni served as a special advisor and later chairman of the steering committee for the experimental Channel 2, towards the establishment of the commercial Channel 2. In the 1990s he served as chairman of the "Livni Committee" - a public committee appointed by Communications Minister Shulamit Aloni and Justice Minister David Libai to examine the structure and functioning of public broadcasting. This was the first of a series of committees to follow. The committee's recommendations served as the basis for various proposals that have come up over the years to reform the Israel Broadcasting Authority.

In 2004 Livni was elected head of the board of directors for Channel 2's news company. In 2007 he was removed from the board after a principled struggle to defend the public interest in contrast to the interests of the channel franchisees' private holders. As part of this struggle he had voiced an objection to the appointment of Rafi Ginat as the News Company's CEO, and eventually succeeded in preventing this appointment following a prolonged struggle. The Attorney General of Israel announced that Livni's removal was significantly flawed.

=== Other occupations ===
Beginning in late 1970, he hosted the hour-long personal radio program "Between Friday and Saturday - A conversation for Two" on Saturday night at 23:00 on Kol Yisrael's Reshet Bet radio channel. The program was dedicated to conversation with figures from the fields of culture, literature, politics, science, and other fields. The program touched on the essential, human, the timeless. The questions may have been difficult but the atmosphere was one of pleasant conversation, with humor and warmth. In the 1990s he also hosted the series "Askola" on Israeli Educational Television, which dealt with the Hebrew language.

Livni served in a number of public offices, including president of The Council for a Beautiful Israel, chairman of the judges panel for the Sapir Prize for Literature (from 2005 to 2009), head of The Institute for the Translation of Hebrew Literature into foreign languages, and chairman of "Words and figures", a project that holds in-depth interviews, of several hours each, with the world's greatest Jewish writers and thinkers, including Philip Roth, Saul Bellow, Amos Oz, and others.

In 2015 he received an Honorary doctorate from Ben-Gurion University of the Negev.

=== Literary career ===
In his youth Livni was a member of the "Likrat" ("Towards") literary circle, which was the first group of poets and writers following the establishment of the state. Together they issued the literary journal "Likrat", where Nathan Zach, Yehuda Amichai, and David Avidan published their first works. Livni also wrote stories that appeared in "Likrat" and elsewhere.

In recent years he has been engaged in writing a novel, The Substance of Life, portions of which were published in the quarterly Siman Kriah and the Newspaper Yedioth Ahronoth. In 2015 he published the book Fragments from The Substance of Life in Hebrew, garnering positive reviews which have called the book "a literary miracle" and "a ravishing book" The book includes an afterword by the writer Eleonora Lev.

=== Personal life ===
In the 1960s, Livni was married to poet Dahlia Ravikovitch for three years. The two remained close friends until the poet's death. He then married attorney and former member of the Knesset Eti Livni née Feierstein, with whom he had three children. Livni died on 12 February 2017, at the age of 82.
