= Moshe Harif =

Israeli politician (1933–1982)

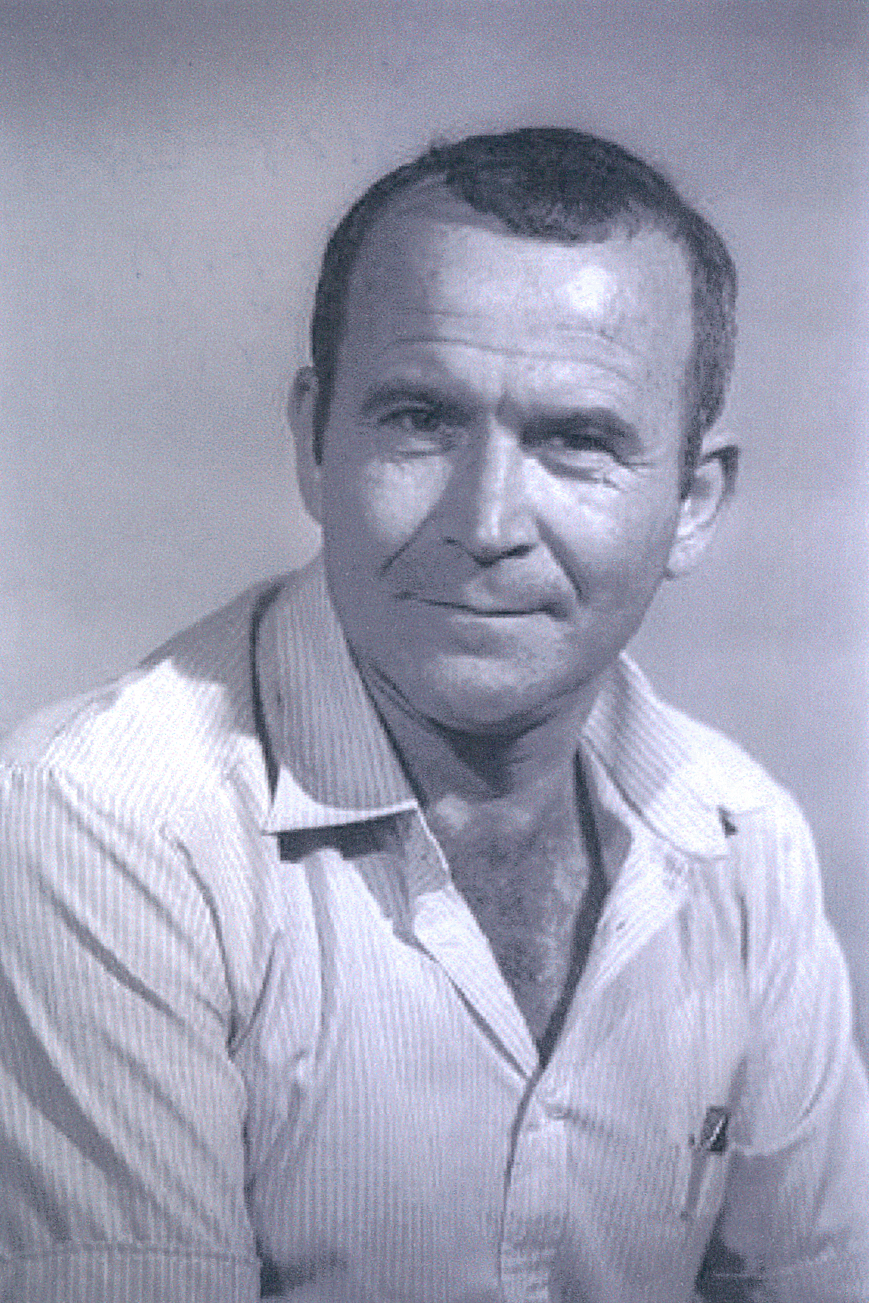
- Harif in the early 1980s

Faction represented in the Knesset
- 1981–1982: Alignment

Personal details
- Born: 2 June 1933 Sosnowiec, Poland
- Died: 16 January 1982 (aged 48)

Moshe "Moussa" Harif (Hebrew: משה "מוסה" חריף; 2 June 1933 – 16 January 1982) was an Israeli politician and kibbutz activist.

== Biography ==
Born in Sosnowiec, Poland in 1933 to a Jewish family, Harif immigrated to Mandatory Palestine the following year. He attended Beit Hinuch high school in Jerusalem, and went on to study architecture and urban construction at the Technion.

In 1952 he joined Kibbutz Tzora. He became a member of the Meuhedet movement, and served as its co-ordinator in the Jerusalem area from 1953 until 1955, and as its secretary from 1958 until 1959. Between 1968 and 1974 he worked in the planning department of Kibbutz HaMeuhad. He later became secretary of Ihud HaKvutzot VeHaKibbutzim and helped establish the United Kibbutz Movement, a merger of the two organisations.

== Political career ==
In 1981 he was elected to the Knesset on the Alignment list. However, he died in mid-January the following year in a traffic collision that also resulted in the deaths of his wife and son. His seat was taken by Edna Solodar.

== Legacy ==
Neve Harif, a new kibbutz established in 1983, was named after him.
