= Yosef Paritzky =

Israeli politician (1955–2021)

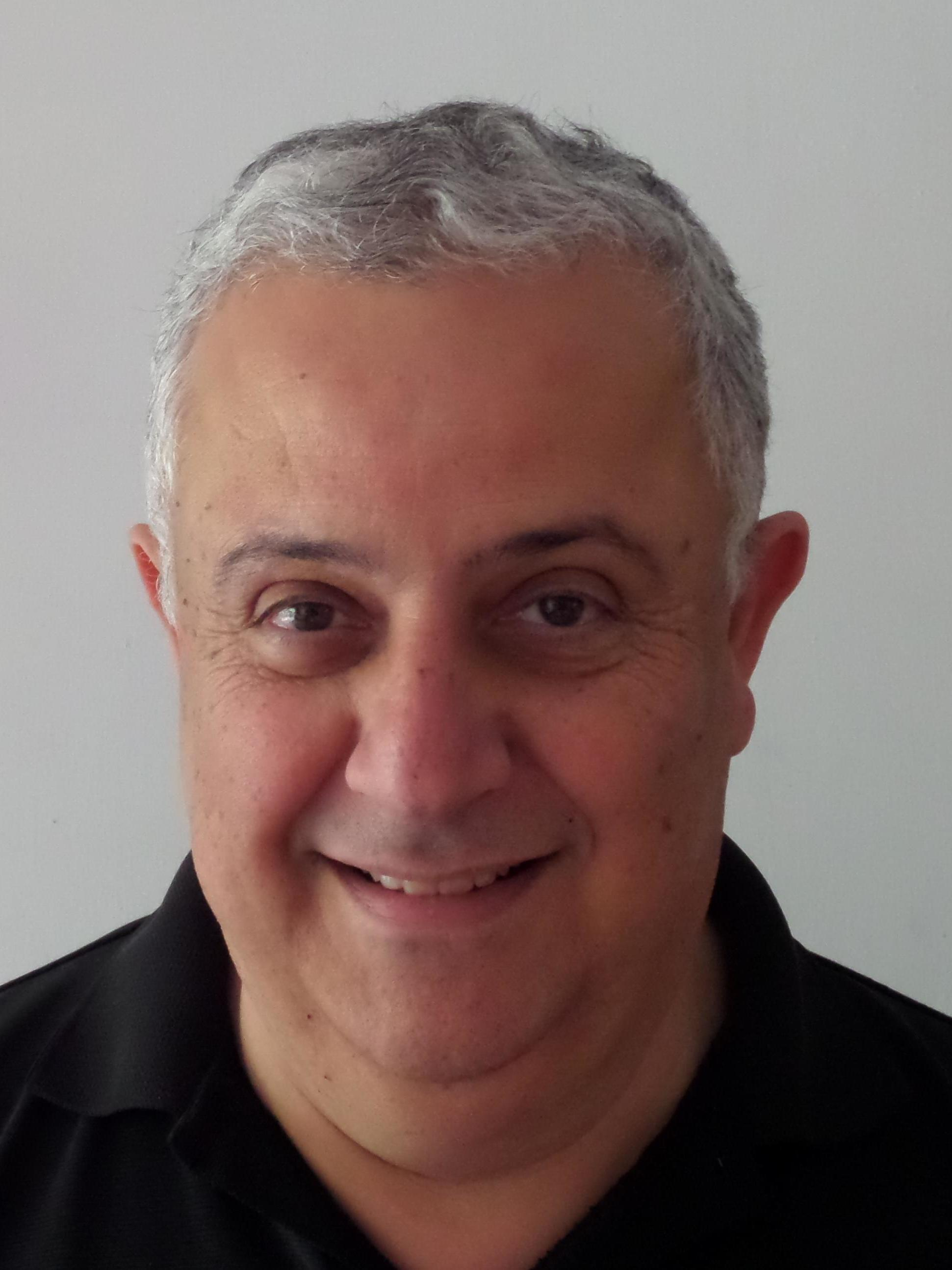
- Paritzky in 2013

Ministerial roles
- 2003–2004: Minister of National Infrastructure

Faction represented in the Knesset
- 1999–2005: Shinui
- 2005–2006: Tzalash

Personal details
- Born: 14 September 1955 Jerusalem, Israel
- Died: 5 October 2021 (aged 66)

Yosef Yitzhak Paritzky (Hebrew: יוסף יצחק פריצקי; 14 September 1955 – 5 October 2021) was an Israeli attorney, politician and columnist.

== Background ==
Born and raised in the Beit HaKerem neighbourhood of Jerusalem, he attended high school in the Hebrew University Secondary School. Later Paritzky studied law at the Hebrew University of Jerusalem, where he gained an LL.B., and went on to work as an attorney. He was an attorney both in Israel and in New York.

Paritzky was known as a secular liberal who advocated for the separation of state and religion in Israel. He formed the association Am Hofshi (Free People) and was its chairman. Due to his activities he was offered a seat on the Shinui list prior to 1999 elections.

After winning a Knesset seat in the elections, Paritzky served as a member of the finance committee. He was re-elected in 2003 and was appointed Minister of National Infrastructure and Energy in Ariel Sharon's government. Paritzky established the natural gas system in Israel and also led dramatic changes in the electricity and water fields. He was the first to suggest an "Infrastructure Undersea Tunnel" between Turkey and Israel and gave licenses to the first private power stations in Israel.

However, Paritzky had to leave his position in the Government in July 2004, due to the demand of Tommy Lapid, head of Shinui, with whom Paritzky had a long and bitter dispute. Tapes of Paritzky were published in which he was heard apparently attempting to catch Avraham Poraz, the party's deputy leader, in wrongdoings. Paritzky's actions were investigated by the police, but charges were not brought since the police and the Attorney General found no evidence of any criminal acts.

Shinui, led by Lapid and Poraz, attempted to have Paritzky expelled from the Knesset and replace him with another Shinui MK. However, the Knesset House Committee refused this attempt and allowed him to retain his seat. Paritzky then announced that he was forming his own party, Tzalash, and would run in the 2006 elections, saying his goal was for Shinui "not to attain the minimum number of votes needed to get into the Knesset". Although it was possible for the faction to receive 600,000 shekels in electoral funding, Tzalash did not participate in the 2006 elections.

Despite Tzalash's demise, two of Paritzky's goals were realised; Poraz was defeated in Shinui's primary elections in January 2006, with Paritzky saying Poraz and party leader Lapid "should have been sent home long ago". In addition, in the elections, Poraz's new party, Hetz, and Shinui both failed to win any seats.

He was married and had three children.
