= Avi Yehezkel =

Israeli politician (born 1958)

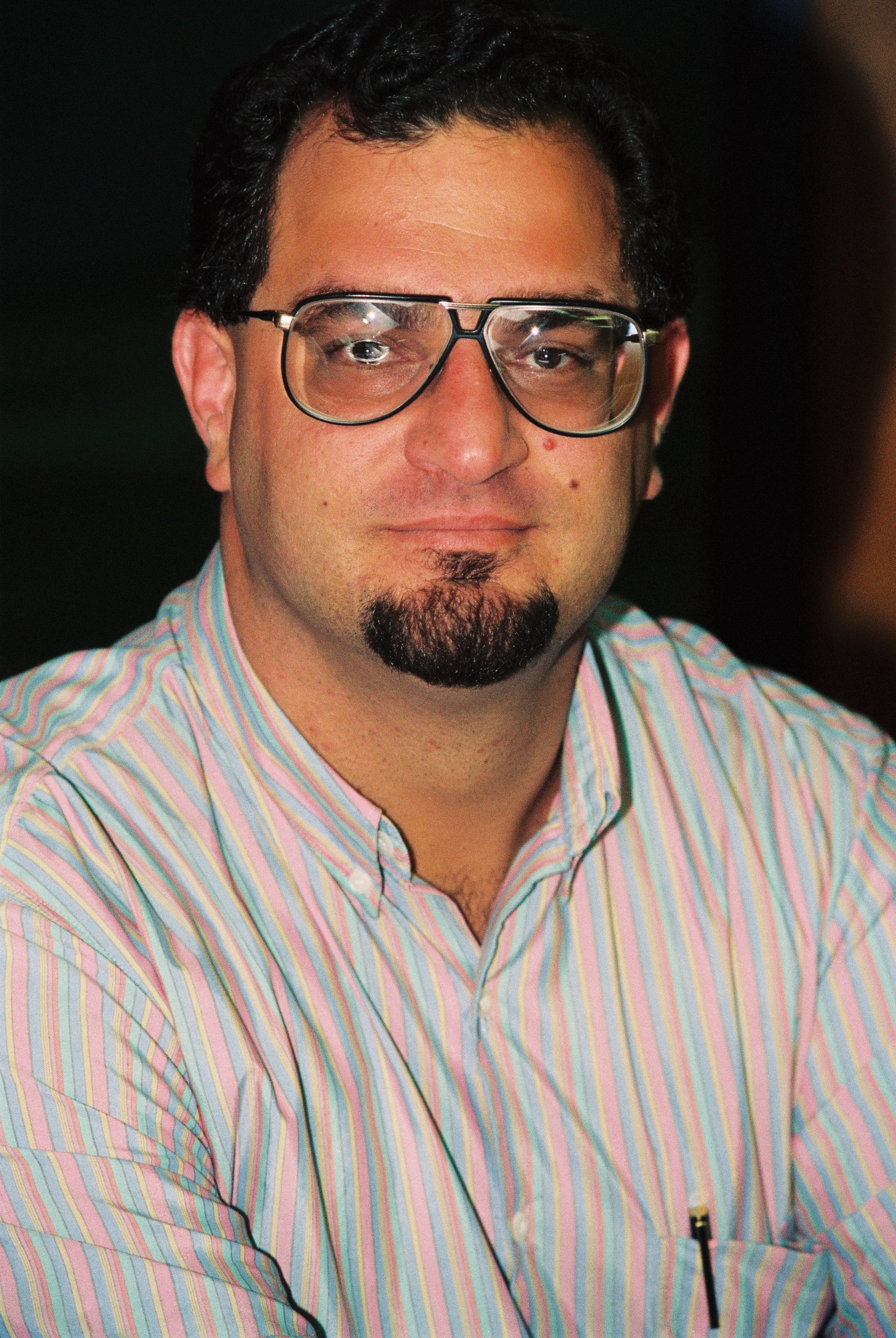
- Yehezkel in 1992

Faction represented in the Knesset
- 1992–1999: Labor Party
- 1999–2001: One Israel
- 2001–2003: Labor Party
- 2006: Labor Party

Personal details
- Born: 10 June 1958 (age 68) Tel Aviv, Israel

Avraham "Avi" Yehezkel (Hebrew: אברהם "אבי" יחזקאל; born 10 June 1958) is an Israeli former politician who served as a member of the Knesset for the Labor Party between 1992 and 2003, and again briefly in 2006.

== Biography ==
Avraham (Avi) Yehezkel was born in Tel Aviv. He earned a BA in economics at Tel Aviv University and an MA in law from Bar-Ilan University.

== Political career ==
Yehezkel was first elected to the Knesset in 1992 and chaired the Knesset's Sports Committee. He was re-elected in 1996, after which he chaired the Economic Affairs Committee. After being placed 21st on the One Israel list (an alliance of Labor, Meimad and Gesher), he was re-elected for a second time in 1999. During his third term as an MK, he chaired the Public Petitions Committee and the Joint Committee for the Defense Budget. In March 2001 he was appointed Deputy Minister of Transport, but left the government along with the rest of the party in November 2002.

For the 2003 elections he was placed 24th on the party's list (a seat reserved for people from the center of the country), and lost his seat when they won only 19 seats. Although he re-entered the Knesset on 17 January 2006 as a replacement for Dalia Itzik (who left the party and resigned her seat in order to join Kadima), on 28 January Yehezkel resigned his seat and was replaced by Dani Koren.

== See also ==
- Politics of Israel
