= Erela Golan =

Israeli politician (born 1945)

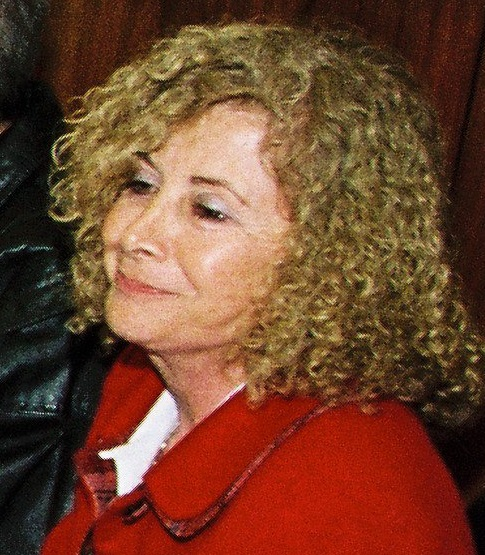
- Golan in the mid 2000s

Faction represented in the Knesset
- 2003–2006: Shinui
- 2006: Secular Faction

Other roles
- 2005: Shadow Minister of Tourism

Personal details
- Born: 11 October 1945 (age 80) Petah Tikva, Mandatory Palestine

Erela Golan (Hebrew: אראלה גולן; born 11 October 1945) is an Israeli former politician who served as a member of the Knesset for Shinui and the Secular Faction between 2003 and 2006.

== Biography ==
Born in Petah Tikva, Golan gained a BA in theatre and an MA in biology, specialising in neurophysiology. She also studied preservation of construction heritage at Tel Aviv University, and later worked as an architect.

In 1980 she joined Shinui. For the 2003 elections she was placed 16th on the party's list. Although the party won only 15 seats, as the next candidate on the list, Golan entered the Knesset on 16 December 2004 as a replacement for Yehudit Naot who died while in office. During her first term, she was a member of the Internal Affairs and Environment Committee, the Education, Culture, and Sports Committee, the Committee on the Status of Women, the Committee on Drug Abuse and the Science and Technology Committee.

Along with most of the party's MKs, she defected to the Secular Faction (which later became Hetz) shortly before the 2006 elections following disagreements over the results of Shinui's primary results. She was placed seventh on the Hetz list for the elections, but lost her seat when the party failed to cross the electoral threshold.

She later joined Meli Polishook-Bloch's Derekh Aheret movement, of which she was the deputy leader, before leaving to join Efraim Sneh's Yisrael Hazaka party in early 2008.
