= Nathan Shahar =

Israeli singer

Nathan Shahar (Hebrew: נתן שחר; 1937–2021) was an Israeli choir conductor, composer, and musicologist, an author of several books on Hebrew singing.

For many years, he taught the history of Hebrew singing at Beit Berl College and Ben-Gurion University.

== Notable songs ==
- אילת החן — lyrics by Oded Betzer; first place at the 1965 Singer and Chorus Festival (he:פסטיבל הזמר והפזמון 1965), performed by Arik Einstein and an additional performance by Yafa Yarkoni.

== Books ==
- “Ha-Shir ha-Eretz-Israeli 1920-1950: Me'afyenim. Musiqaliyim ve-Sotzio-Musiqaliyim” [The Eretz-Israeli Song 1920-1950: Sociomusical and Musical Aspects], Ph.D. dissertation, The Hebrew University of Jerusalem, 1989 [in Hebrew]
- "שיר שיר עלה-נא" Shir Shir Ala-Na [Song O Song, Go Up]. Modan Publishing, 2006.
- Shirat Hanoar-Ma Sharu Betnuot Hanoar [The Song of Our Youth]. Jerusalem: Yad Iizhak Ben Zvi, 2018
