= Orna Angel =

Israeli politician

Faction represented in the Knesset
- 2006: Labor Party

Personal details
- Born: 29 July 1962 (age 63) Jerusalem, Israel

Orna Angel (Hebrew: אורנה אנג'ל; born 29 July 1962) is an Israeli architect and former politician who served as a member of the Knesset for the Labor Party for one week in February 2006.

== Biography ==
Born in Jerusalem, Angel studied at the Hebrew University High School, and then at the Bezalel Academy of Arts and Design and the Technion. She subsequently worked in the Ministry of Housing.

Becoming involved in politics, she led a Jerusalem-based organisation that campaigned for Ehud Barak in the 1999 general elections. For the 2003 elections she was placed 31st on the Labor Party list. Although she missed out on a seat when the party won 19 mandates, she entered the Knesset on 8 February 2006 as a replacement for Sofa Landver, who herself had only entered the Knesset on 11 January. However, a week later she resigned her seat due to a conflict of interest (she was employed as director-general of the government-owned Otzar Mifalei Yam, which controlled most of Tel Aviv Port) and was replaced by Neta Dobrin.
