= Eliezer Sandberg =

Israeli politician (born 1962)

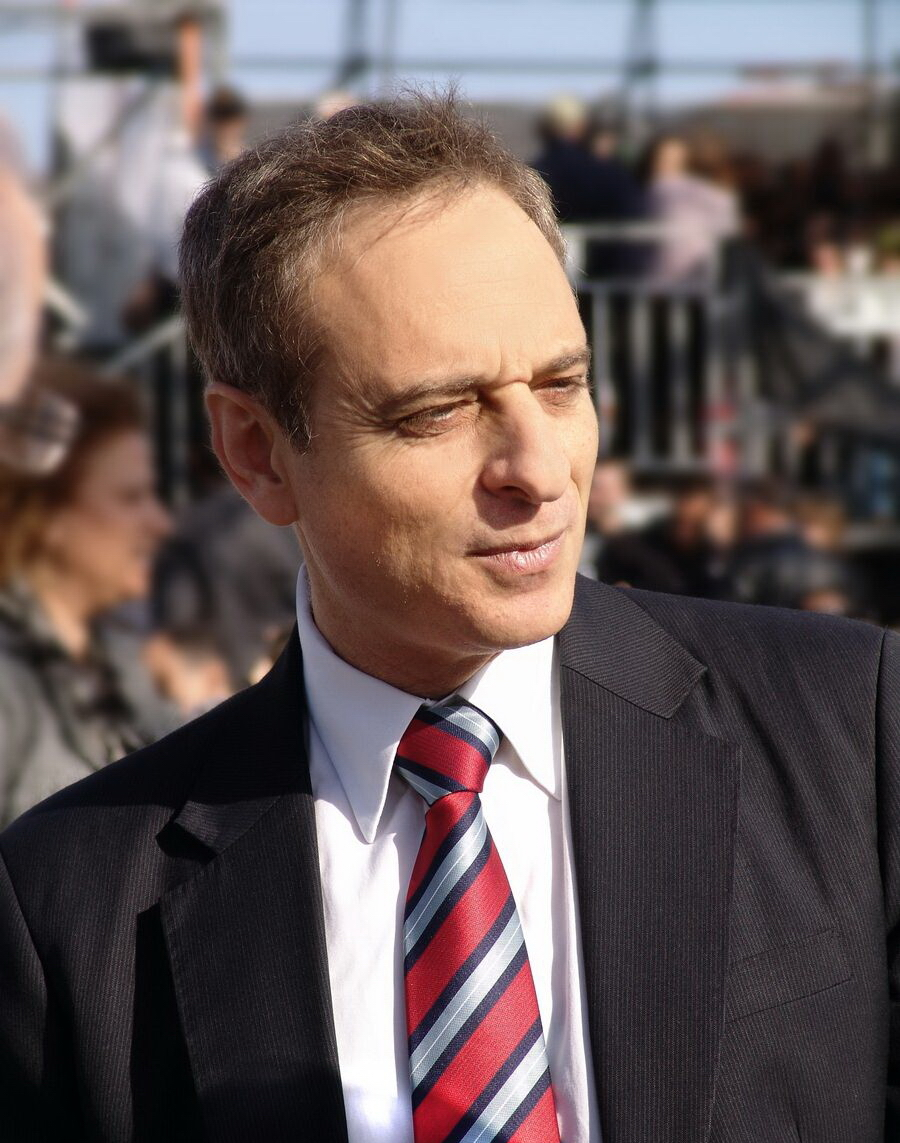
- Sandberg in 2017

Ministerial roles
- 2003–2004: Minister of Science & Technology
- 2004: Minister of National Infrastructure

Faction represented in the Knesset
- 1992–1999: Tzomet
- 1999: Israel in the Center
- 1999: HaTzeirim
- 1999–2006: Shinui
- 2006: Hetz
- 2006: National Home

Other roles
- 2005: Shadow Minister of Foreign Affairs

Personal details
- Born: 21 February 1962 (age 64) Haifa, Israel
- Nickname: Hamoody/Moody

Eliezer Sandberg (Hebrew: אליעזר זנדברג; born 21 February 1962) is an Israeli former politician who served as a government minister between 2003 and 2004, and as a Member of the Knesset between 1999 and 2006. He was world chairman of Keren Hayesod in 2010-2018.

== Biography ==
Born in Haifa, Sandberg studied law at Tel Aviv University, gaining an LLB. He is married with three children.

== Political career ==
Sandberg joined the Tzomet party and became a member of its secretariat in 1988. He also served as the party's legal adviser and chairman of its Haifa branch. In 1992 he was elected to the Knesset on Tzomet's list. He was re-elected in 1996 and in November 1998 was appointed Deputy Minister of Education. On 23 February 1999 he left Tzomet to become a founding member of the Israel in the Centre party (later renamed the Centre Party), but on 22 March he left the new party to establish his own faction, HaTzeirim.

On 29 March, HaTzeirim merged with Shinui. Sandberg was re-elected on the Shinui list in 1999 and 2003. In February 2003, he was appointed Minister of Science and Technology, a role he held until July 2004 when he became Minister of National Infrastructure. He left the cabinet on 4 December 2004 when Shinui withdrew from the coalition government.

In January 2006 Sandberg was amongst the Shinui MKs who left the party to establish Hetz. On 5 February, he and Hemi Doron established the National Home. Prior to the 2006 elections the two joined Likud, but were not included on its list, and thus lost their seats in the election.

== Controversy ==
In 2017, Sandberg was named as a suspect in a corruption-tainted multi-million-dollar deal with a German shipyard. He was convicted in 2022 and sentenced to 7 months of community service and a 50,000 NIS fine.
