= Ronen Tzur =

Israeli politician

- רונן צור
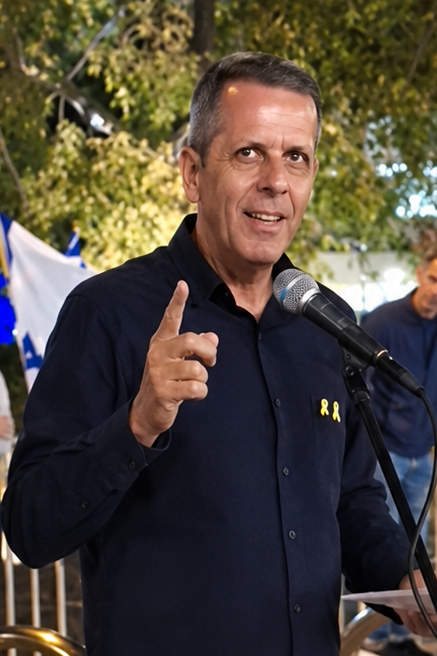

Faction represented in the Knesset
- 2006: Israeli Labor Party

Personal details
- Born: 27 July 1969 (age 56)
- Party: The Democrats

Ronen Tzur (Hebrew: רונן צור; born 27 July 1969) is an Israeli politician who briefly served as a member of the Knesset for the Labor Party in 2006.

== Political career ==
Ronen Tzur entered politics in 1990, joining the Labor Party. In later years he served as coordinator of the party's faction at the Knesset (under Prime Minister Yitzhak Rabin), political advisor to minister Binyamin Ben-Eliezer, and director of an association for discharged soldiers. He was placed 28th on the Labor Party list for the 2003 elections, in which the party won 19 seats. However, he entered the Knesset on 22 January 2006 following the resignation of Salah Tarif, serving during the last three months of its term.

In 2010, Tzur advised former president Moshe Katzav regarding the allegations of rape for which he was convicted in 2010.

In 2018, through his company, Rosenbaum Communications, a public relations firm; Tzur led a strategic media smear campaign to block the extradition of Malka Leifer, a former school principal and the accused in the Adass Israel School sex abuse scandal, whom Australia has attempted to extradite to stand trial for 74 counts of child sex abuse.

In early 2019, Tzur became an official advisor to former Israel Defense Forces chief of staff Benny Gantz and the Israel Resilience Party.

During the Gaza war, Tzur was a media advisor to the Hostages and Missing Families Forum. In February 2024, he stepped down after 45 families had signed a petition seeking his ouster.

On June 15, 2026, Tzur announced at the "Victory Machine Conference" in Tel Aviv that he would run in the primaries in The Democrats party. Tzur was quoted as saying: "I know how to beat them. I know how to defeat them. I know how to answer them in their language. I know all the tricks and gimmicks, they are afraid of me, and therefore I will run and ask for your trust."
