= Dani Koren =

Israeli politician (1945–2024)

Faction represented in the Knesset
- 2006: Labor Party

Personal details
- Born: 19 February 1945
- Died: 14 February 2024 (aged 78)

Dani Koren (Hebrew: דני קורן; 19 February 1945 – 14 February 2024) was an Israeli politician who briefly served as a member of the Knesset for the Labor Party in 2006.

== Biography ==
The son of politician Yitzhak Coren, Koren studied at the Hebrew University of Jerusalem, gaining a BA in economics and political science, and an MA in political science. He went on to study for a PhD in government at the London School of Economics.

For the 2003 Knesset elections he was placed 30th on the Labor Party list. Although he missed out on a seat when the party won only 19 seats, he entered the Knesset on 28 January 2006 as a replacement for Avi Yehezkel. He lost his seat in the March 2006 elections. In 2015 Koren gained an honorary professor title from the National University of Political Studies and Public Administration.

Koren died on 14 February 2024 at the age of 78.
