= Eliezer Cohen =

Israeli politician

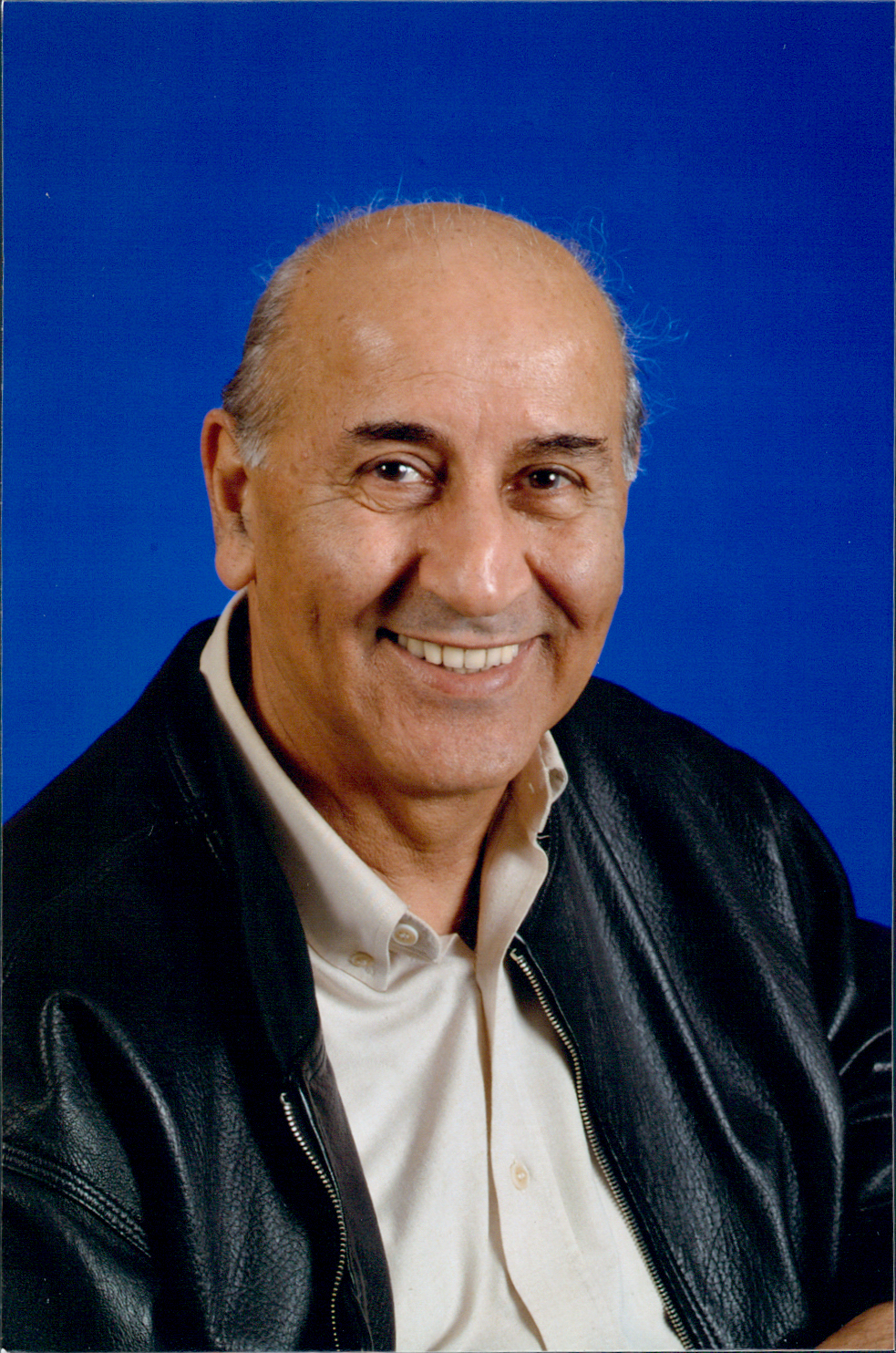
- Cohen during his time in the Knesset

Faction represented in the Knesset
- 1999–2003: Yisrael Beiteinu
- 2003–2006: National Union
- 2006: Yisrael Beiteinu

Personal details
- Born: 18 June 1934 (age 92) Jerusalem, Mandatory Palestine

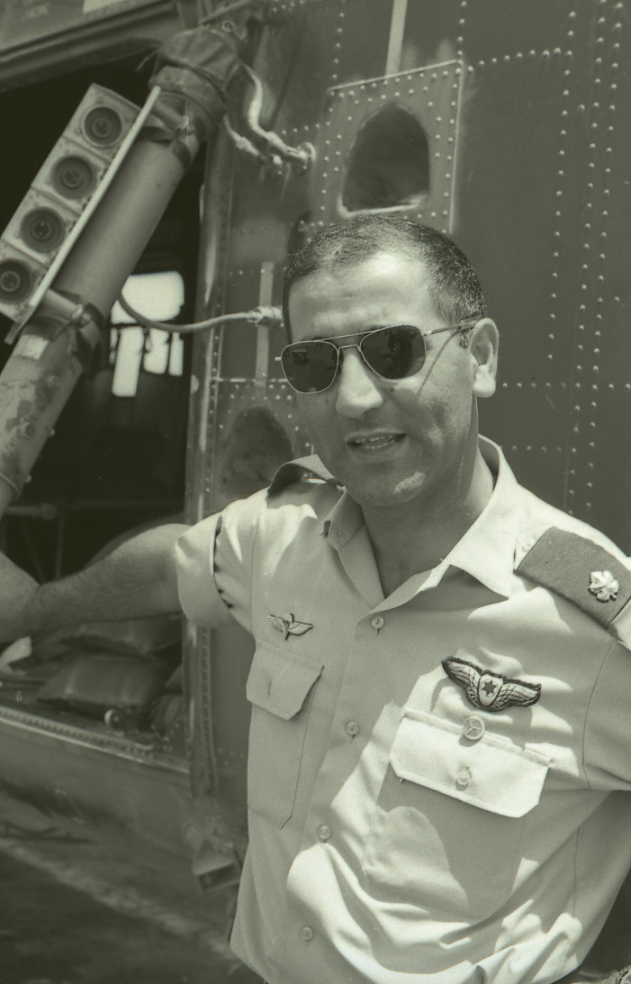
Cohen in 1967

Eliezer Cohen (Hebrew: אליעזר כהן; born 18 June 1934) is an Israeli former politician who served as a member of the Knesset for Yisrael Beiteinu and the National Union between 1999 and 2006.

== Biography ==
Eliezer Cohen was born in Jerusalem. He earned an MA from Tel Aviv University. Cohen is the older brother of Nechemya Cohen, one of the most decorated soldiers in Israeli history, who was killed during the Six-Day War.

== Aviation career ==
Cohen served as a pilot, squadron commander, base commander and Sinai area commander in the Israeli Air Force until 1974 when he retired as a colonel. During his service he was decorated for courage for an operation behind enemy lines the details of which remain confidential. He went on to become the director general of the Ben Gurion International Airport and at the same time joined the Free Centre party. He also began working as a commercial pilot for El Al where over 25 years he flew each of the airline's fleet aircraft as well as participated in the airlift of Jews from Iran and Ethiopia. In 1990 he published a best selling book about the history of the Israeli Airforce titled in Hebrew השמים אינם הגבול or the Sky is Not the Limit. The English version of the book, Israel's Best Defense, was published in the US and the UK by Orion Books (a Division of Random House).

== Political career ==
Between 1977 and 1978 he was a member of the Democratic Movement for Change. He was also chairman of the Israeli Organization for a Change in the Government System and made significant contributions both in and out of the Knesset to establish a constitution for Israel.

In 1999 he helped establish Yisrael Beiteinu, and was placed fourth on the Yisrael Beiteinu list for the elections that year. He entered the Knesset when the party won four seats, and during his first term, was a member of the House Committee, the Constitution, Law and Justice Committee, the Committee on the Status of Women, the Science and Technology Committee, and the parliamentary inquiry Committee on the Issue of Water.

During the Knesset term Yisrael Beiteinu allied with the National Union, and ran under its banner in the 2003 elections. Cohen was placed eighth on the alliance's list, and lost his seat when the party won only seven mandates. However, he re-entered the Knesset on 26 March 2003 (37 days after leaving it) after Avigdor Lieberman resigned his seat after being appointed Minister of Transport. Cohen decided not to run for re-election in the 2006 elections.

== Controversy ==
On 21 October 2012 Cohen was convicted of indecently touching an El Al flight attendant during a trip from New York to Tel Aviv. The stewardess filed a police complaint after the plane landed but Cohen denied the allegations. At the trial in Rishon LeZion Magistrate's Court before Judge Sarit Zamir, Cohen was found guilty. He appealed in a district court, with the judge ruling that as his act had no sexual basis. His conviction was amended from an indecent act to assault.
