= Efi Oshaya =

Israeli politician

- אפי אושעיה
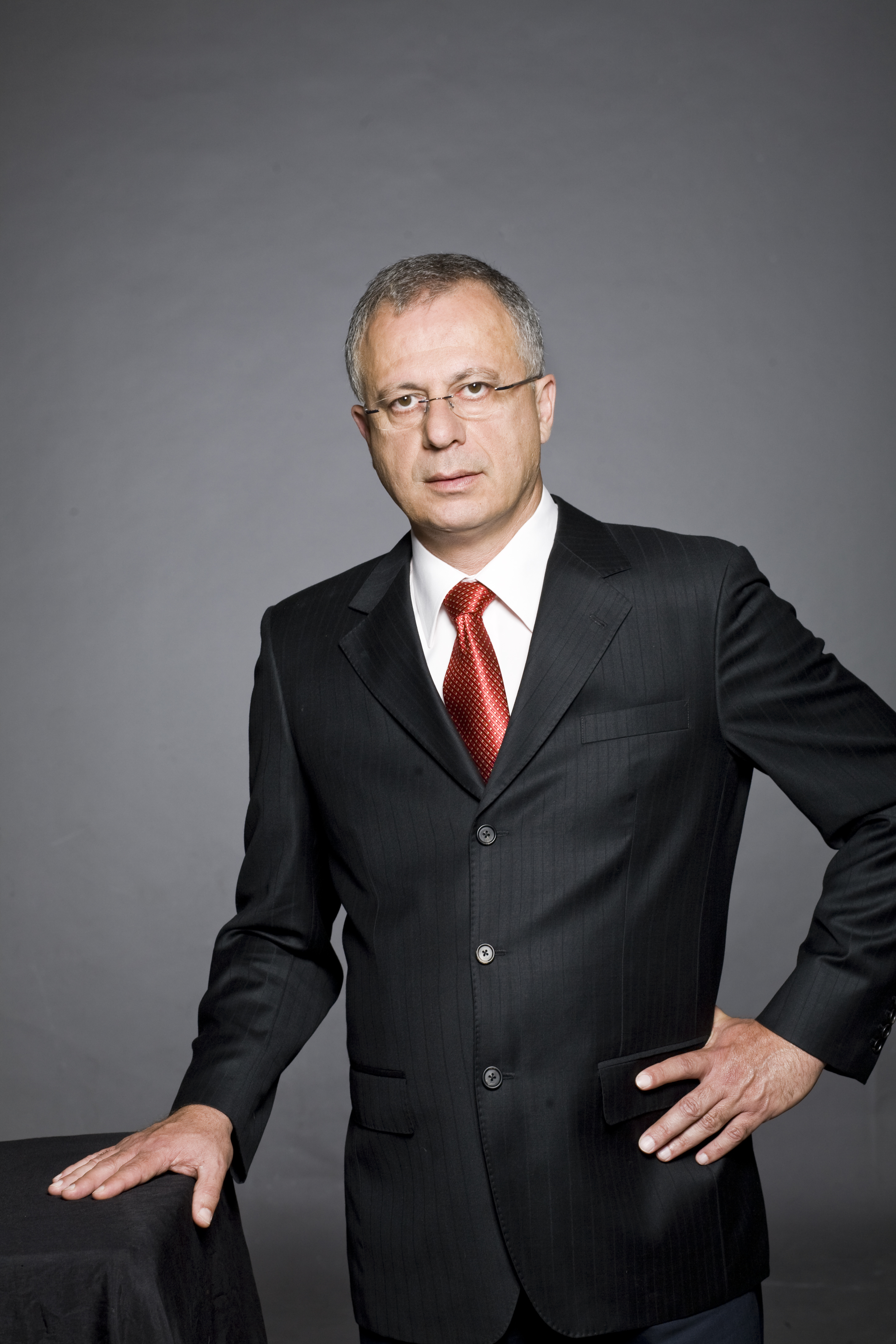

Faction represented in the Knesset
- 1996–1999: Labor Party
- 2001: One Israel
- 2001–2003: Labor Party
- 2006: Labor Party

Personal details
- Born: 2 June 1956 (age 69) Israel

Efi Oshaya (Hebrew: אפי אושעיה; born 2 June 1956) is an Israeli politician and a former member of the Knesset for the Labor Party.

== Biography ==
Oshaya was born in Israel and completed his military service with the IDF's Air Force with the rank of First Sergeant.

His political activity included his election as chairman of the Histadrut in Netanya and as a member of Netanya's local council. In 1996, he was first elected to the Knesset and served as the Labor's group whip. In the elections to the fifteenth Knesset, in 1999, Oshaya was left out until 2001, when Uzi Baram retired from politics. He remained in the Knesset until the expiration of its term, in 2003, and during this time served as group chairperson for One Israel (a list comprising the Labor Party, Gesher and Meimad). In 2006 he re-entered the Knesset, replacing Haim Ramon, but resigned less than 24 hours later due to conflict of interest with his professional work in lobbying.

Oshaya is currently heading "Policy" firm for lobby and business networking. He is also chairman of the Labor Party's election committee.
