= Hemi Doron =

Israeli politician (born 1956)

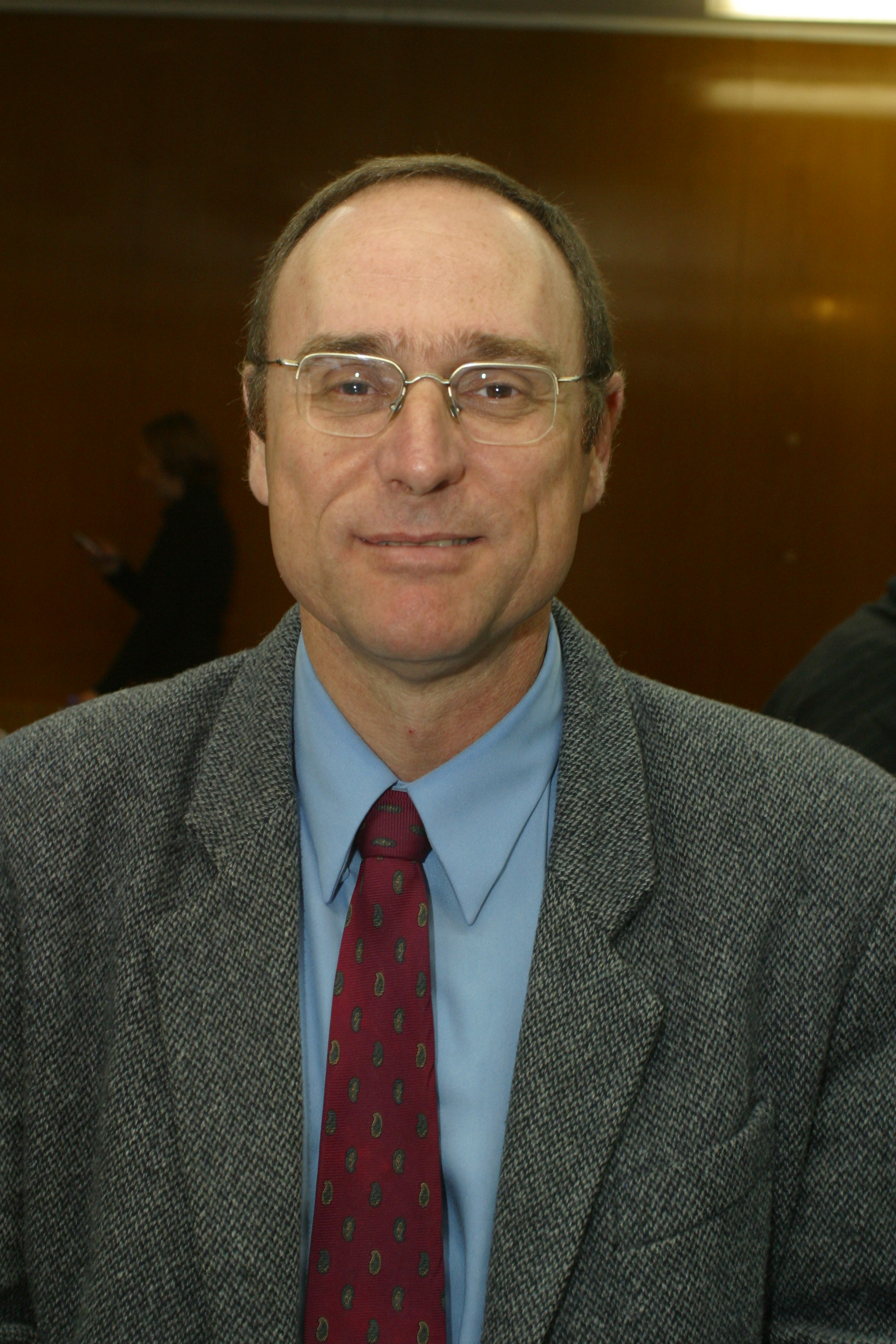
- Doron in 2003

Faction represented in the Knesset
- 2003-2006: Shinui
- 2006: Secular Faction
- 2006: National Home

Other roles
- 2005: Shadow Minister of National Infrastructure

Personal details
- Born: 16 October 1956 (age 70) Rishon LeZion, Israel

Nehemia "Hemi" Doron (Hebrew: נחמיה "חמי" דורון; born 16 October 1956) is an Israeli politician who served as a member of the Knesset for Shinui, the Secular Faction and National Home between 2003 and 2006.

== Biography ==
Born in Rishon LeZion, Doron gained an LLB at the College of Management and also studied political science at Tel Aviv University before becoming an insurance lawyer.

== Political career and public office ==
In 1993 he was elected to Rishon LeZion local council, where he served until 2003. Between 1993 and 1994 he was a delegate to the Zionist Congress and was a member of the Zionist Executive Committee in 1994.

For the 2003 elections he was placed 14th on the Shinui list, and entered the Knesset when the party won 15 seats. During his first term, he was a member of the Foreign Affairs and Defense Committee, the Committee for Immigration, Absorption and Diaspora Affairs, the Labor, Welfare and Health Committee, the Internal Affairs and Environment Committee and the Committee on Foreign Workers. He was also a Deputy Speaker of the Knesset.

Along with most of the party's MKs, he defected to the Secular Faction (which later became Hetz) on 26 January 2006. On 5 February he and Eliezer Sandberg broke away from the Secular Faction to form National Home. The new party was dissolved shortly before the 2006 elections and both Dorom and Sandberg joined Likud. However, neither were included on Likud's list and both lost their seats. In primaries held in 2008 he won fifty-ninth on the Likud list for the 2009 elections, but was not elected.

After leaving parliament Doron founded Path to Proper Governance Movement, a non-parliamentary organisation whose goal was to combat local authority corruption.

On 28 August 2008 Doron was appointed mayor of the Arab city Tayibe by the Ministry of Internal Affairs, a post he held until September 2009.
