= National Home =

National Home הבית הלאומי
- Leader: Eliezer Sandberg; Hemi Doron
- Founded: 5 February 2006
- Dissolved: March 2006
- Split from: Secular Faction
- Merged into: Likud
- Ideology: Liberalism; Secularism
- Political position: Centre
- Most MKs: 2 (2006)
- Fewest MKs: 2 (2006)

National Home (הבית הלאומי, HaBayit HaLeumi) was a short-lived political faction in Israel during 2006.

== Background ==
National Home was formed on 5 February 2006 when two MKs, Hemi Doron and Eliezer Sandberg broke away from the Secular Faction (itself a recent breakaway from Shinui). The faction received 600,000 shekels in party funding (transferred from Hetz, the Secular Faction's new guise).

The faction was dissolved shortly before the March 2006 elections when both Doron and Sandberg joined Likud. They were included on Likud's Knesset list, placed in the symbolic 117th and 118th places in the party list, and both lost their seats.
