= Sofa Landver =

Israeli politician (born 1949)

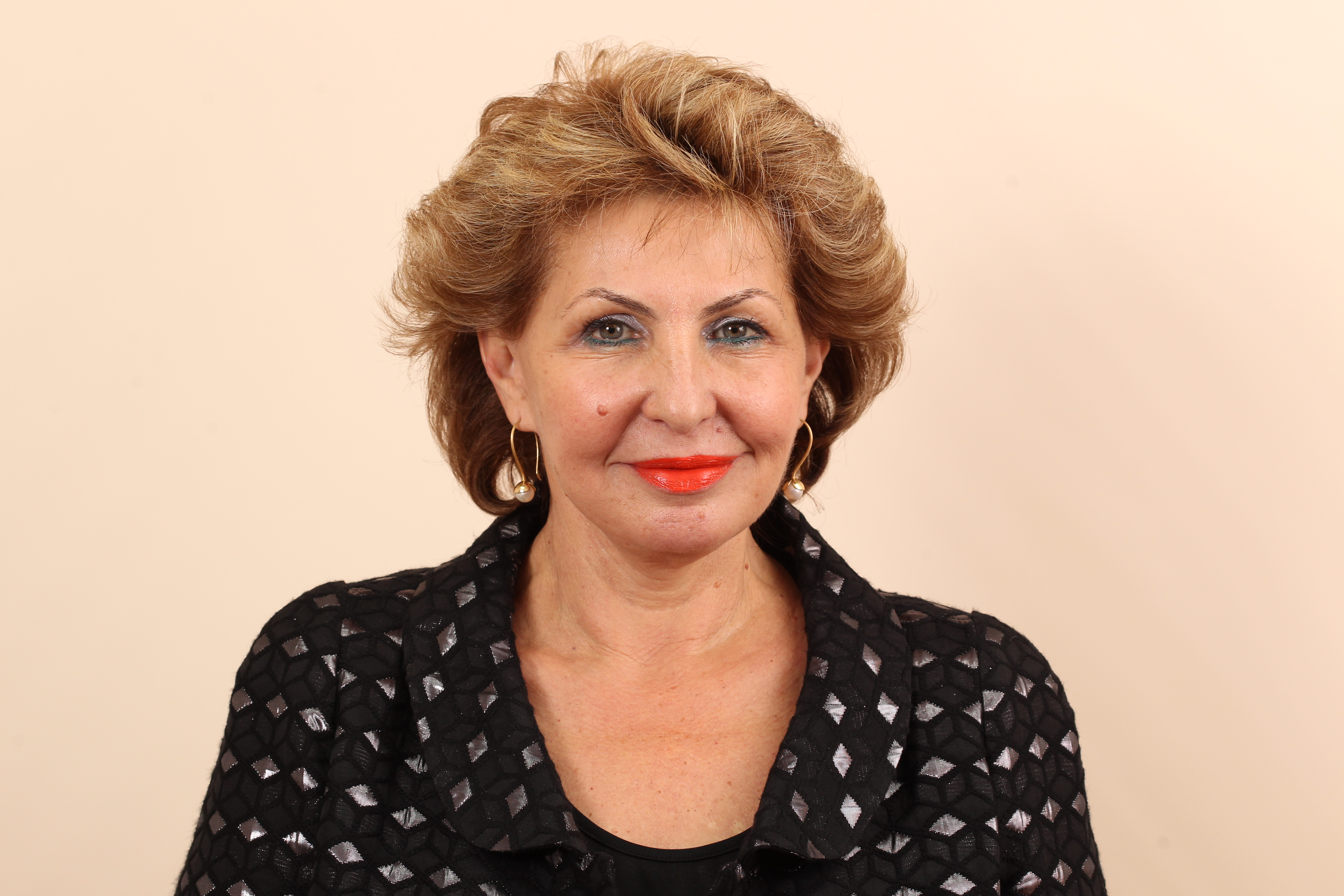
- Landver in 2013

Ministerial roles
- 2009–2015: Minister of Immigrant Absorption
- 2016–2018: Minister of Aliyah and Integration

Faction represented in the Knesset
- 1996–1999: Labor Party
- 1999–2001: One Israel
- 2001–2003: Labor Party
- 2006: Labor Party
- 2006–2019: Yisrael Beiteinu

Personal details
- Born: 28 October 1949 (age 77) Leningrad, Soviet Union

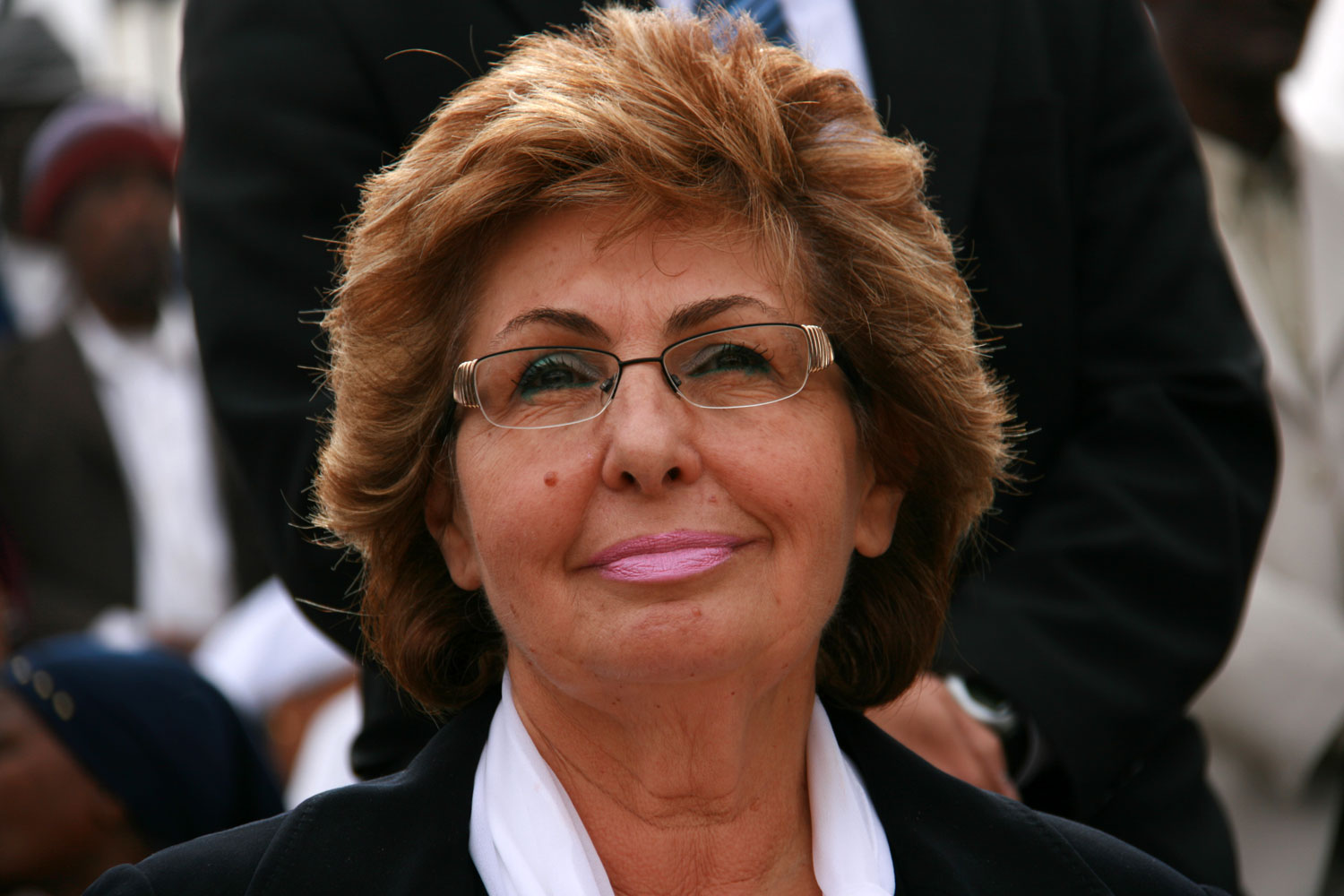
Landver in 2009

Sofa Landver (Russian: Софа Ландвер; Hebrew: סופה לנדבר; born 28 October 1949) is an Israeli politician who served as a member of the Knesset for the Israeli Labor Party and Yisrael Beiteinu, and served as the country's Minister of Aliyah and Integration between 2009-2015 and again from 2016-2018.

== Biography ==
Born in Leningrad in the Russian Republic of the Soviet Union (today Saint Petersburg in the Russian Federation), Landver emigrated to Israel in 1979. She served on Ashdod city council, has been director with the Ashdod Development Company, and a member of the Jewish Agency's board of trustees.

In the 1996 elections she was elected to the Knesset on the Labor Party list. She was re-elected in 1999 and served as Deputy Minister of Transportation between 12 August and 2 November 2002. She lost her seat in the 2003 elections, but entered the Knesset on 11 January 2006 as a replacement for Avraham Shochat. However, she resigned on 8 February, and was replaced by Orna Angel.

Prior to the 2006 elections Landver joined Yisrael Beiteinu, and was placed seventh on its list. The party won 11 seats and she retained her place in the Knesset. She was re-elected again in the 2009 elections after winning fifth place on the party's list. On 31 March she was appointed Minister of Immigrant Absorption.

She was re-elected again in 2013 and retained her place in the cabinet. Although she retained her seat in the 2015 elections, Yisrael Beiteinu did not join the coalition government and Landver lost her ministerial portfolio. However, after the party rejoined the government in May 2016, she was again appointed Minister of Immigrant Absorption, with the ministry renamed in 2017 to become the Ministry of Aliyah and Integration.

Landver retired from politics after the party refused to include her on their electoral list for the April 2019 election. She later left the party in 2021. In July 2026, Landver announced her return to Yisrael Beitenu, but declined to stand for election to the Knesset.

Landver currently lives in Ashdod, and is widowed, with one daughter.
