= Eti Livni =

Israeli politician (born 1948)

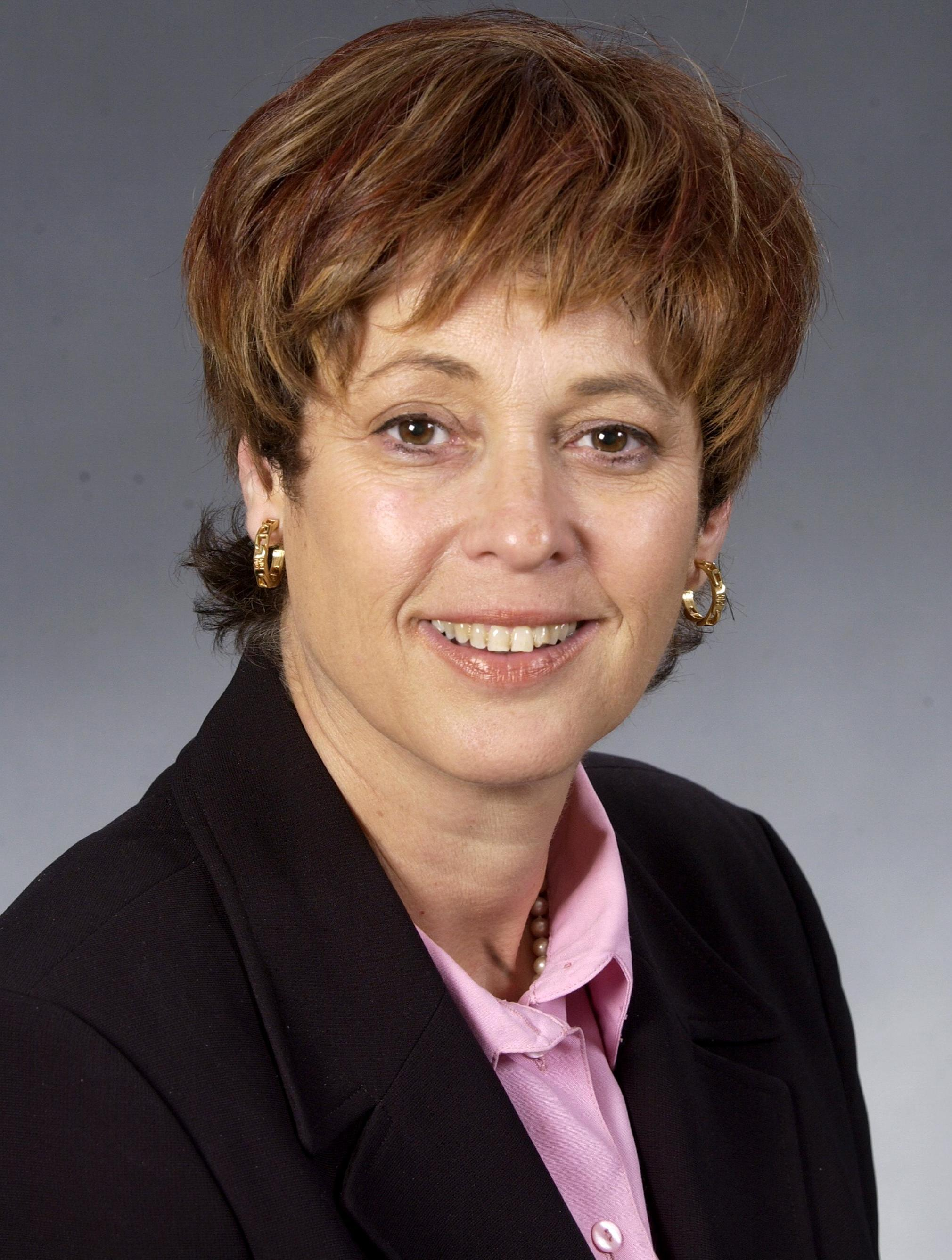
- Livni in 2003

Faction represented in the Knesset
- 2003–2006: Shinui
- 2006: Secular Faction

Other roles
- 2005: Shadow Minister of Justice

Personal details
- Born: 1 June 1948 (age 76); Tel Aviv, Israel

Eti Livni (Hebrew: אתי לבני; born 1 June 1948) is an Israeli former politician who served as a member of the Knesset for Shinui and the Secular Faction between 2003 and 2006.

== Biography ==
In the 1999 elections Livni was placed tenth on the Shinui list, but missed out on a seat when they won only six mandates. For the 2003 elections she was placed 12th on the party's list, and entered the Knesset when the party won 15 seats. During her first term, she chaired the Committee on the Status of Women and was a Deputy Speaker of the Knesset.

Along with most of the party's MKs, she defected to the Secular Faction (which later became Hetz) shortly before the 2006 elections following disagreements over the results of Shinui's primary results. She was placed sixth on the Hetz list for the elections, but lost her seat when the party failed to cross the electoral threshold.

In 2008 it was announced that Livni would run for a spot on the Kadima list for the 2009 elections. Ultimately she was placed 51st on the party's list, failing to win a seat.
