= Michael Melchior =

Israeli rabbi and politician

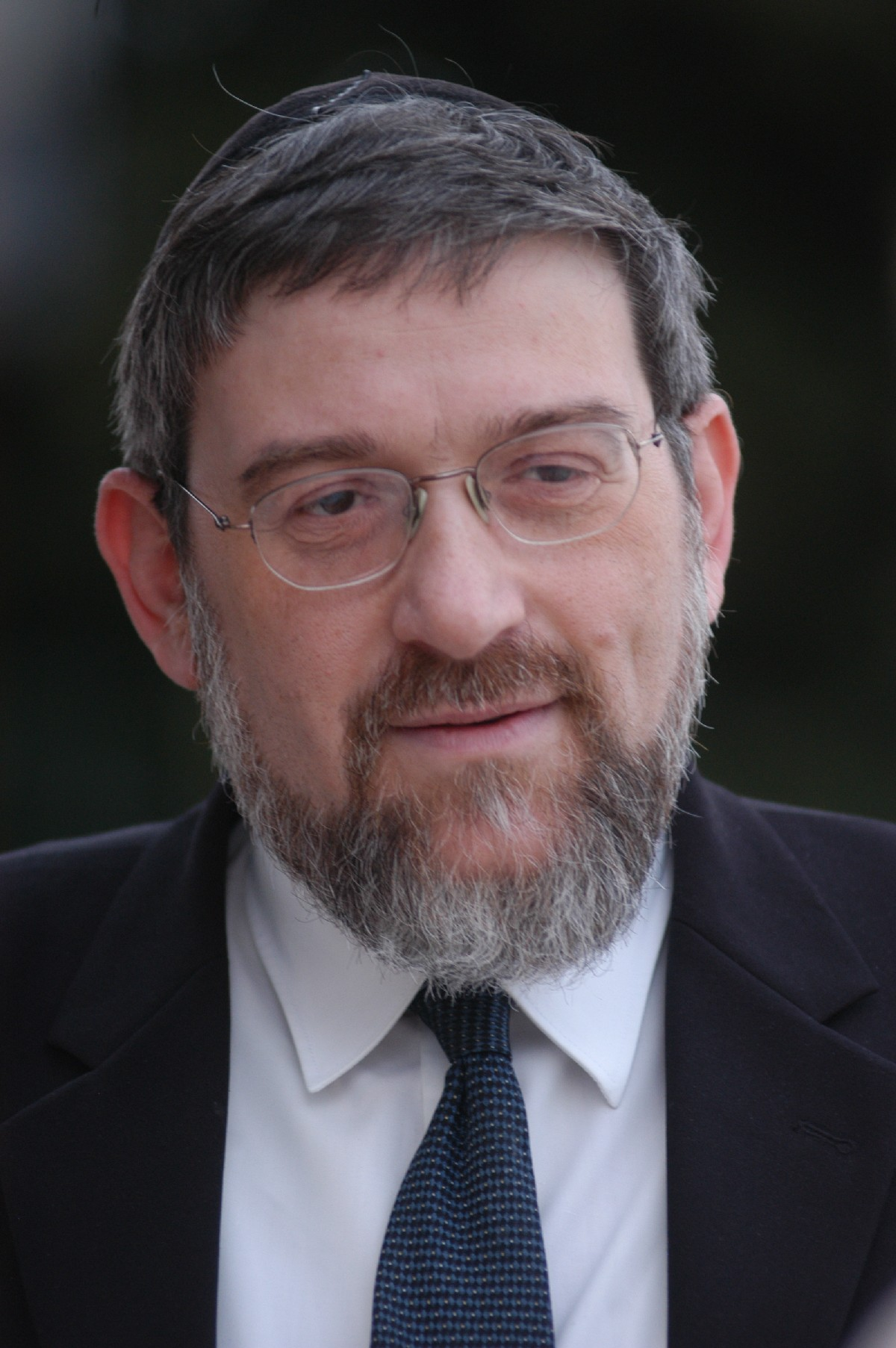

Ministerial roles
- 1999–2001: Minister of Social & Diaspora Affairs

Faction represented in the Knesset
- 1999–2001: One Israel
- 2001–2009: Meimad

Personal details
- Born: 31 January 1954 (age 72) Copenhagen, Denmark

Michael Melchior (Hebrew: מיכאל מלכיאור; born January 31, 1954) is a Jewish leader, Orthodox rabbi, thinker, and activist. He is a former Minister of Social and Diaspora Affairs, a former Deputy Minister of Foreign Affairs, and a former member of Knesset for Meimad. He is the Rabbi of a community in Talpiyot, Jerusalem (Beit Boyar), while still holding the title of the Chief Rabbi of Norway.

== Biography ==
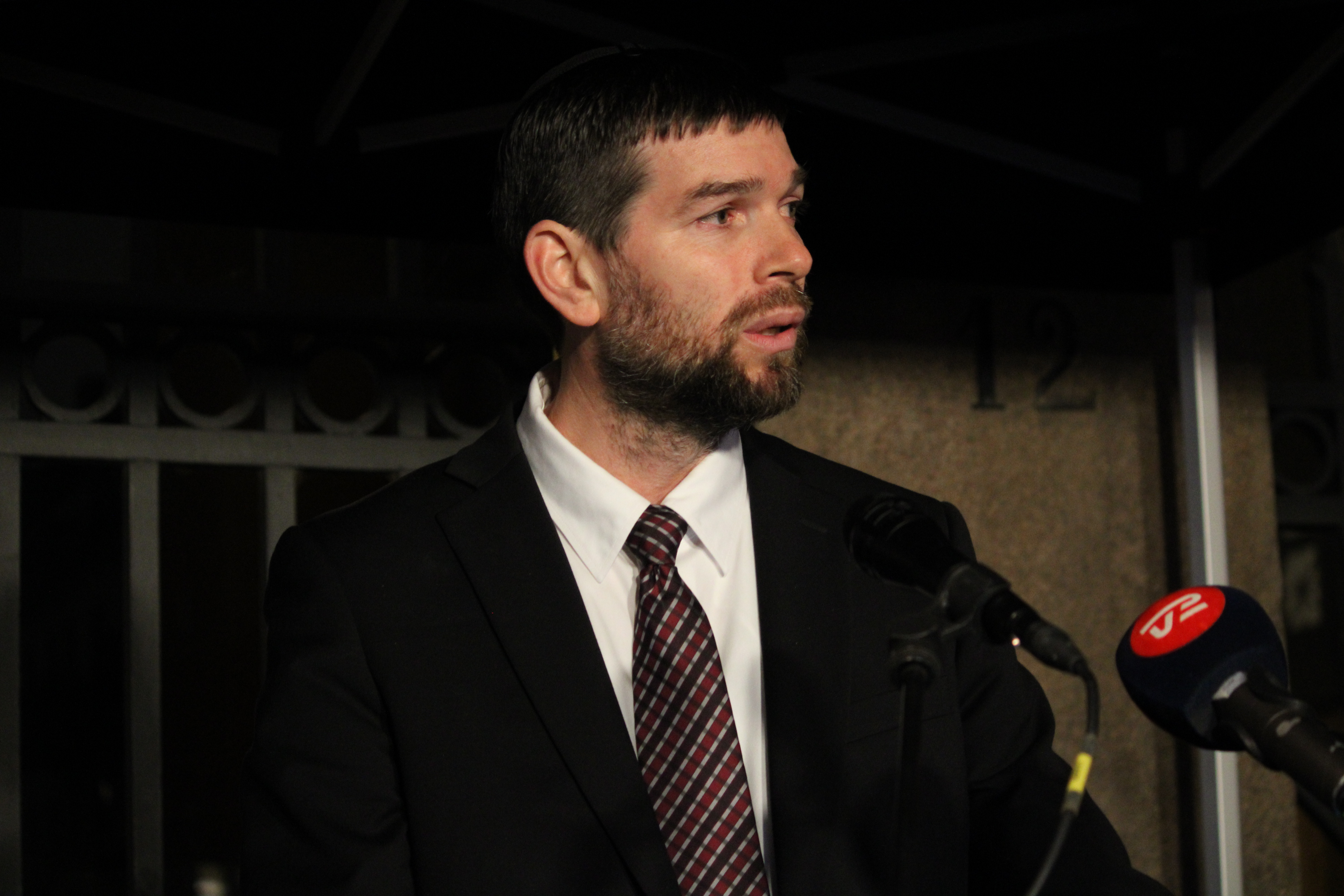
Michael Melchior's son Jair Melchior as chief Chief Rabbi of Denmark in 2025

A descendant of seven generations of rabbis in Denmark, Melchior was born in Copenhagen, Denmark, in 1954. His grandfather, Marcus Melchior, helped orchestrate the escape of Danish Jews during the Nazi occupation of Denmark, and served as the country's chief rabbi until his death in 1969. Michael was ordained as an Orthodox Rabbi at Yeshivat Hakotel of Jerusalem in 1980. Soon afterwards, he returned to Scandinavia to serve as Chief Rabbi of Norway.

In 1986, he immigrated to Israel, and settled down with his family in Jerusalem, while still holding the honorary title of Chief Rabbi of Norway.

== Political career ==
Melchior entered politics with the Meimad party in 1995. When Rabbi Yehuda Amital was appointed minister without portfolio after the assassination of prime minister Yitzhak Rabin in November 1995, Melchior served as Amital's assistant. Melchior was selected chairman of the managing committee of the Meimad party in late 1995.

In the 1999 elections, Meimad ran as part of the One Israel alliance with the Labor Party and Gesher. Melchior won a seat, and was appointed Minister of Social and Diaspora Affairs on 5 August 1999, a post he held until Ariel Sharon became Prime Minister in 2001. Melchior was re-elected to the Knesset as a member of the joint list in 2003 and 2006, as Meimad continued its alliance with the Labor Party. In 2008, Meimad broke away from the alliance, and ran in partnership with the Green Movement in the 2009 elections, but failed to win a seat. On December 14, 2012, on his Facebook page, he said that he will quit Knesset elections.

== Extra-parliamentary political and social activities ==
As part of his official roles in the Knesset and the Israeli government, Melchior was involved with Birthright Israel, an organization that has brought over 200,000 young Jews to explore their heritage in Israel.

In addition, Rabbi Melchior established a number of civil organizations that focus on issues he dealt with in his parliamentary activities, concerning education, inter-Jewish relations, the environment, economics, and Arab-Israeli peace.

He founded The Yachad Council, which promoted dialogue between religious and secular Jews, and he served as honorary chairman of the Citizens' Accord Forum Between Jews and Arabs in Israel. CAF conducted activities that promoted civic engagement, encouraged active citizenship, and inspired members of the public to play an active role in formulating policies that affect their daily lives and their future. CAF worked to create dialogue and civic action groups of Jews and Arabs across the country, in cooperation with civic and community organizations, including groups of ultra-Orthodox and Arab participants, among them a group of ultra-Orthodox Jewish women and religious Arab women, with the aim of building a shared society in a sustainable democracy in Israel.

While serving in the Knesset, Rabbi Melchior became concerned about the growing polarization between the different Jewish sectors in Israel. One contributing factor was the division of students in different educational streams: religious, secular, ultra-Orthodox, and Arab. These divides in the schools strengthened polarization between the Jewish sectors and reinforced a lack of common narrative, values, and vision for the future of the state. As a response, in 2001, Melchior established Meitarim—a network of pluralistic Jewish schools in Israel where religious and secular students can grow up and learn together in kindergartens, schools, pre- and post-military institutions in a non-coercive approach, enabling multiple interpretations and expressions of Jewish heritage to take responsibility for tolerance and the establishment of a collective narrative. Since 2001, Meitarim has disseminated its experimental infrastructure and curricula to over 15,000 students and instructors in collaboration with 120 educational institutions.

In 2002, Melchior initiated, together with his Palestinian counterpart Sheikh Talal Sider, an inter-religious summit in Alexandria, Egypt, co-sponsored by the Mufti of Egypt, Grand Imam of al-Azhar Mosque, and Grand Sheikh of al-Azhar University, Muhammad Sayyid Tantawi; Archbishop of Canterbury George Carey; and Eliyahu Bakshi-Doron, Israel's Chief Rabbi. The summit, which launched The Alexandria Process, brought together religious leaders from the Middle-East to adopt common principles aimed at preventing the region's religious sensibilities from being exploited during conflicts, and declaring the need to work together towards peaceful solutions of the conflicts. Together with Elie Wiesel, Melchior established the Mosaica Center for Interreligious Cooperation—MERPI (Middle East Religious Peace Initiative) to "lead to the implementation" of the principles of the Alexandria Declaration and continues to serve as chair of both of Mosaica's branches. Melchior is also a member of the Elijah Interfaith Institute Board of World Religious Leaders.

Mosaica's second branch is The Center for Conflict Resolution by Agreement which Rabbi Melchior also serves as chairman. The center serves as a professional address for establishing understandings and agreements between individuals, organizations, groups, and communities. The center believes in every person's abilities to resolve conflicts and to operate in cooperation with the aid of tools from the realm of mediation. Mosaica supports the activities of 44 mediation and dialogue centers across the country with the aim of making the activities accessible to an array of communities in Israel. Thus, individuals, groups, and communities can contribute to a cohesive and respectful Israeli society.

More controversially, in September 2012, Melchior claimed that extremist Islamic leaders, including the leaders of Hamas, are ready for peaceful co-existence with Israel, and he added that he has "yet to meet with somebody who is not willing to make peace" with the Jewish state of Israel, placing the onus for lack of peace with extremist Islamic movements on Israel.

An additional initiative of Rabbi Melchior was Kulanu. Kulanu sought to strengthen the Jewish character of the State of Israel, enhance democracy, and foster unity through its diverse projects. Kulanu was best known for its Chagim BaKehilla (literally: holidays in the community) program, which provided religious services for secular Jews for many of the Jewish holidays. Kulanu worked with Teva Ivri to launch the Shmita Yisraelit program. Other Kulanu programs included Yom Kippur Shel Kulanu; B'Yachad: For a Shared Jewish Democratic Society; Meitarim: Inclusive Jewish Educational Network; and Shmita Yisraeli (in coordination with Teva Ivri).

In 2010, Melchior involved himself in economic issues. He co-founded the Israel Civic Action Forum which promotes higher taxation on income from the extraction of natural resources, and the use of the tax income for higher government spending to increase government spending on welfare, education, and health.

In 2014, he, along with Hadassah Froman of Tekoa and Rav Yoel Bin-Nun of Alon Shevut, participated at the Gush Etzion mourning where a kidnapping of three yeshiva students took place on June 12, 2014, who were found dead on June 30, 2014, and are believed to have been killed shortly after being kidnapped.

== Prizes and awards ==
Melchior is a recipient of The Norwegian Award For Tolerance & Bridge Building in the Nobel Institute (1988), The Church Of England's Coventry International Prize For Peace & Reconciliation (2002), and the Liebhaber Prize For The Promotion Of Religious Tolerance And Cultural Pluralism (2007). On January 26, 2016, Rabbi Melchior was awarded The FRRME (Foundation for Relief and Reconciliation in the Middle East) Annual Peace Prize for 2015 at the House of Lords in London. On April 29, 2019, Melchior was awarded the Jean Nussbaum and Eleanor Roosevelt International Award of Excellence at the Global Summit on Religion, Peace, and Security in Geneva which was co-organized by the International Association for the Defense of Religious Liberty and the United Nations Office on Genocide Prevention.
