= Meimad =

Meimad מימד
- Leader: Yehuda Amital; Michael Melchior
- Founded: 1988
- Ideology: Religious Zionism; Social democracy Two-state solution
- Political position: Centre-left
- Religion: Orthodox Judaism
- Most MKs: 2 (1999, 2001)

Election symbol
- מי

Website
- english.meimad.org.il

Meimad (Hebrew: מימד, an acronym for Medina Yehudit, Medina Demokratit (מדינה יהודית, מדינה דמוקרטית), lit., Jewish State, Democratic State) is a moderate to left-wing religious Zionist political party in Israel. Founded in 1999, it is based on the ideology of the Meimad movement founded in 1988 by Rabbi Yehuda Amital. It was formed by religious Zionists who supported the peace process and believed the National Religious Party had drifted too far to the right.

At the national level, it was in alliance with the Labor Party, and until the 2006 election, received the 10th spot on the Labor Knesset list. Meimad ended the pact with the 2009 election, formed an alliance with the Green Movement, and failed to win enough votes to be elected to the Knesset.

== History ==
The Meimad movement was founded on 1 June 1988 by Rabbi Yehuda Amital, and included former National Religious Party Knesset member Yehuda Ben-Meir. It emerged from Oz ve Shalom (Strength and Peace), an Orthodox Jewish peace movement. It contested the 1988 Knesset elections, receiving 0.7% of the vote and failing to cross the 1% electoral threshold. Following the assassination of Prime Minister Yitzhak Rabin in 1995, his successor, Shimon Peres, invited Rabbi Amital to serve as a Minister without Portfolio. He held this position until 1996.

Eleven years later, a political party for the movement was established, and joined the One Israel alliance that won the Knesset elections that year. Meimad received one seat, taken by Michael Melchior. It gained a second when Yehuda Gilad replaced Maxim Levy in 2002. Tova Ilan also represented Meimad in the Knesset for a brief spell in 2006, after several other Labor MKs resigned. It attracted moderates among immigrants from the English-speaking world, including Shimon Glick.

In November 2008, minister and former Labor Party member Ami Ayalon joined Meimad. In the same month, the party ended its alliance with Labor after being told that 10th spot on the list would no longer be reserved for Meimad for the 2009 legislative elections.

Shortly afterwards, Ayalon announced his resignation from politics, and the party formed an umbrella alliance with the Green Movement.

In 2012, Melchior announced that he would not stand for election. The party was revived in 2018.

== Ideology ==
The party emphasizes the values of many social democratic parties, except on religious issues. Meimad, like Labor, takes a centre-left approach to the Israeli–Palestinian conflict. However, it supports religious studies in the main curriculum of Israel's public schools, and encourages the use of rabbinical courts in addition to civil courts.

Under Melchior, the party has taken an even more left-leaning approach—both in foreign and, especially, in domestic affairs. The party has run in municipal elections in 2003, winning a number of key seats in Tel Aviv. It also ran together with Meretz party in Haifa in which it shared a seat under a rotation agreement. Shlomo Yaakov Rapaport served on the Haifa city council representing Meimad, and was the chairman of the Haifa Aliyah and absorption committee, and the chairman of the municipal committee against alcohol and drug abuse.

== Election results ==
Election	Leader	Votes	%	Seats	+/–	Status
1988	Yehuda Amital	15,783	0.69 (#17)	0 / 120	New	Extraparliamentary
1992	Did not contest					Extraparliamentary
1996	Did not contest					Extraparliamentary
1999	Michael Melchior	Part of One Israel		1 / 120	▲1	Coalition
2003	Michael Melchior	With Labor		1 / 120	▼1	Opposition (2003–2005)
2003	Michael Melchior	With Labor		1 / 120	▼1	Coalition (2005)
2003	Michael Melchior	With Labor		1 / 120	▼1	Opposition (2005–2006)
2006	Michael Melchior	With Labor		1 / 120	Steady	Coalition
2009	Michael Melchior	With the Green Movement		0 / 120	▼1	Extraparliamentary
