= Hetz (political party) =

Hetz חץ
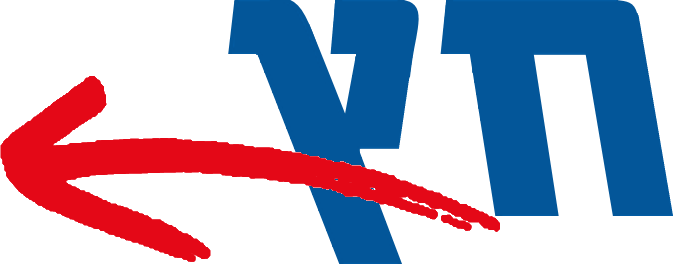
- Leader: Avraham Poraz; Lior Shapira
- Founded: 21 January 2006 (as the Secular Faction)
- Dissolved: 2012 (became Hatnua)
- Split from: Shinui
- Ideology: Liberalism; Secularism; Liberal Zionism
- Political position: Centre
- Most MKs: 11 (2006)
- Fewest MKs: 9 (2006)

Election symbol
- חץ

Website
- hetz.org.il

Hetz (Hebrew: חץ, lit. 'Arrow', also an abbreviation for Hilonit Tzionit, חילונית ציונית, "Secular Zionist") was a secularist political party in Israel.

== History ==
Hetz was formed in the aftermath of the breakup of Shinui towards the end of the 16th Knesset. Avraham Poraz, Shinui's second-in-command after Tommy Lapid was unexpectedly beaten in the race to head the party's list for the 2006 elections by Ron Levintal.

In response to the result, Poraz decided to break away from Shinui. He was joined by ten other Shinui MKs (out of a total of 15), including Lapid. They formed the Secular Faction on 26 January 2006, though on 5 February, Hemi Doron and Eliezer Sandberg left the new party to establish National Home.

Poraz tried to set up Hetz as a new party in January 2006; however, it was too late to register a new party for the election. He tried to form a union with Tafnit, which rejected it. Eventually the party ran with the minor Citizen and State party, which was re-branded as Hetz for the elections. Lapid was presented as the honorary leader.

However, a combination of the split with Shinui (who also ran in the elections with Levintal as head), the founding of centrist party Kadima and Shinui's lack of progress in implementing their agenda in the previous Knesset (despite being the second largest party in the coalition, hardly any of their campaign pledges had been realised) meant that the party had lost much of its supporter base. Ultimately the party won only 10,113 votes (0.33%), far below the 2% electoral threshold. Their only consolation was beating Shinui, who received only 4,675 votes (0.16%).

Prior to the 2009 elections it was announced that the party would be running a joint list with the Greens, with Poraz receiving one of the top five places on the list. However, the agreement was later cancelled and Hetz did not run.

In 2012 Hetz was taken over by Tzipi Livni to form the basis of the Hatnua party, also inheriting the NIS 1.8 million in the party's bank account. Once seven MKs defected from Kadima and joined the party, Poraz announced that they now "represent Hetz in the Knesset".

Hetz ran independently as a minor party in the 2021 election, bringing back the original name but keeping Hatnua's ballot letters (צף). It did not win any seats.

== Ideology ==
Hetz's policies mirrored those of Shinui in being centrist and liberal with a strong secular leaning. The party promised to introduce a constitution, separate religion and state, allow civil marriage and repeal many of the country's arrangements that they claim strongly benefit the Orthodox population (such as large child benefits (many Orthodox having 10 or more children), exemption from military service and payments to yeshivas).

== See also ==
- Liberalism in Israel
