= Tally Gotliv =

Israeli lawyer and politician

- טלי גוטליב
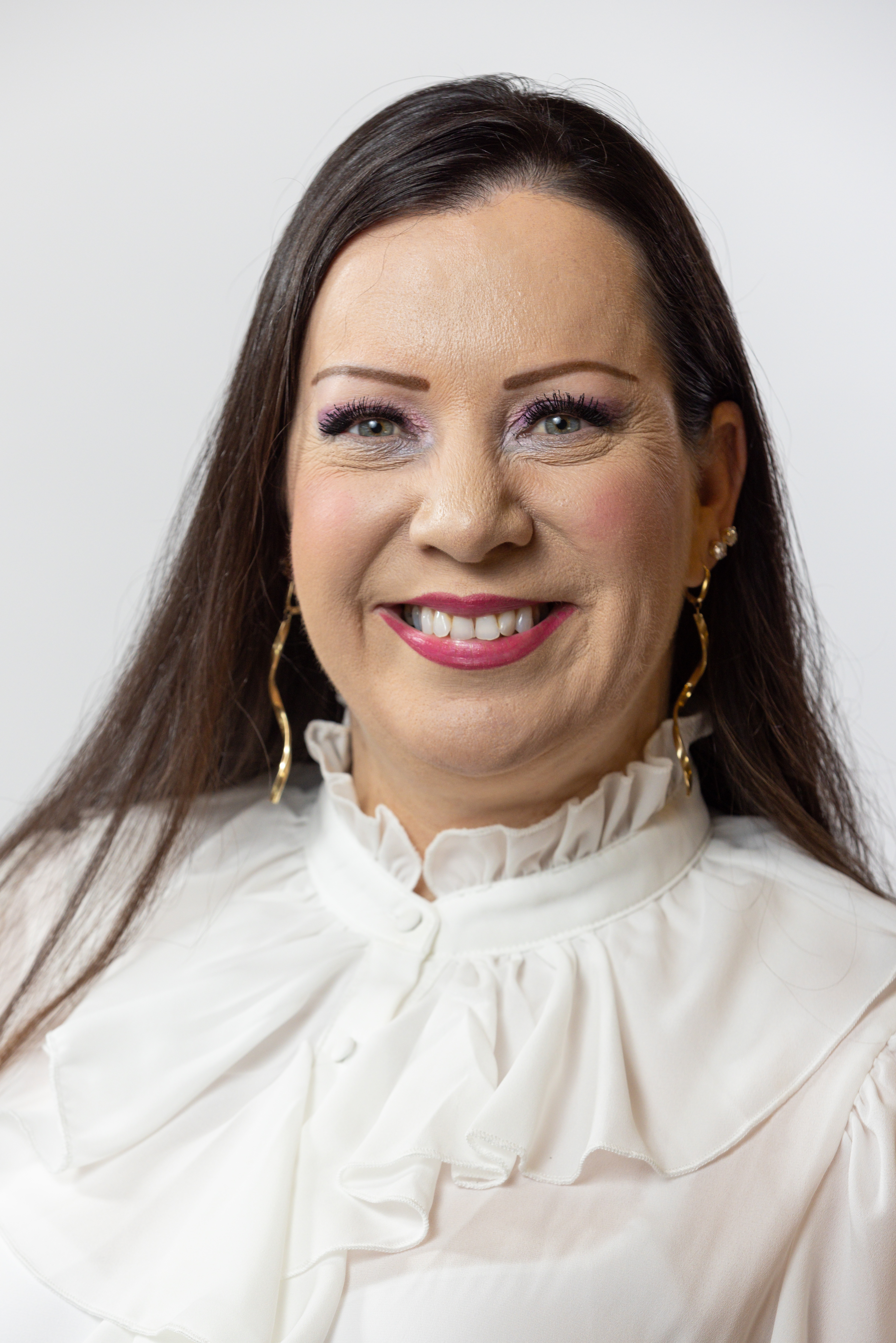
- Official portrait, 2022

Faction represented in the Knesset
- 2022–2026: Likud
- 2026–: Otzma Yehudit

Personal details
- Born: Revital Raz; 3 November 1975 (age 51) Bnei Brak, Israel
- Party: Likud (2022-2026); Shavim (2019)
- Spouse: Nir Gotliv (m. 1995; div. 2016)
- Children: 3
- Relatives: Bracha Peli (great-grandmother); Alexander Peli (great-uncle)
- Education: Bar-Ilan University
- Occupation: Lawyer • Politician

Revital "Tally" Gotliv (Hebrew: טלי גוטליב; born 3 November 1975) is an Israeli lawyer and politician. She is currently a member of the 26th Knesset for Otzma Yehudit and previously served as a member of the 25th Knesset for the Likud.

In her legal career she worked for the State Attorney in the Tel Aviv district and represented defendants in sex crime cases. She garnered attention for her criticism of a rape victim's testimony on social media, which led to a complaint filed against her by the Association of Rape Crisis Centers in Israel, although the complaint was later shelved. Her bid for the chairmanship of the Israel Bar Association in 2016 marked her as the first woman to run for the office, although she came in last place. She was also a panelist on Channel 13's Shishi until May 2022.

Her political career began with her co-founding the Shavim party, which focused on equality for parents and individuals with disabilities, but garnered 401 votes in the April 2019 Israeli legislative election. Subsequently, she joined Likud and was elected to the Knesset. Known for provocative rhetoric, she has made controversial statements on social media and has been accused of spreading conspiracy theories.

Gotliv has been involved in multiple controversies, she has made a number of accusations against the opposition, the army and the Supreme Court, some of which were described as false. She has also been criticised for advocating for a more violent prosecution of the war against Hamas in Gaza.

== Biography ==
Revital "Tally" Raz was born in Bnei Brak to Shimon and Ruth Raz (born Radzinski), and grew up in a Religious Zionist household. Her father's family are Holocaust survivors of French-Jewish origin, and her mother's family is of Ukrainian-Jewish origin.

She served as an artillery instructor in the IDF. She has a B.A. and a Master's degree in Jurisprudence from Bar-Ilan University.

She was married to but is now divorced from numerologist Nir Gotliv and has three children: twin boys, and a daughter who is autistic. She resides in Giv'at Shmuel.

== Legal career ==
Gotliv worked for the State Attorney in Tel Aviv district. She has primarily represented defendants accused of sex crimes. In the case of a 16-year-old girl whose attacker was convicted of rape and indecent acts committed when the girl was 14, she criticized the girl on social media and called her testimony "distorted." The Association of Rape Crisis Centers in Israel filed a complaint against her with the Ethics Committee of the Israel Bar Association. However, the Israel Bar Association decided to shelve the complaint.

In 2012, she was disqualified by the evaluation center for prospective judges based on the criteria of "judicial temperament."

In 2015, she ran for chairmanship of the Israel Bar Association, becoming the first woman to run for the office. She came in last of four candidates, losing to Efi Nave.

Until May 2022, she appeared as a panelist on Channel 13's Shishi.

== Political career ==
Ahead of the April 2019 election, Gotliv helped found Shavim, a political party meant to promote equality between parents and for those with disabilities. She was given the second spot on the party's electoral list. The party won 401 votes. During the 2022 election, she ran for a spot on the Likud's electoral list, and was elected to the twenty-fifth spot.

Gotliv is a member of several Knesset committees. On 29 October 2025 she replaced ousted MK Yuli Edelstein in the Foreign Affairs and Defense Committee. In addition, she is also a member of the Constitution, Law and Justice Committee, the Labor and Welfare Committee, the State Control Committee and the Special Committee for the Rights of the Child.

Gotliv, as a member of the State Control Committee, voted in October 2025 against the creation of a commission of inquiry on the 7 October attacks.

She reached a deal with Likud ahead of the 2026 Israeli legislative election which will allow her to run with Otzma Yehudit in the election. She will remain a Likud member for the remainder of the Knesset term and will not be penalized for leaving the party; if she had, she would have been unable to run in the election. She was placed in the second slot on Otzma Yehudit's list and was re-elected to the Knesset.

== Views ==
After the 2023 Huwara rampage, Gotliv refused to condemn the attacks. In February 2023, she posted a tweet accusing Supreme Court President Esther Hayut of responsibility for a terrorist attack that took place in the Ramot neighborhood of Jerusalem in which three people were killed. As a result, Knesset Ethics Committee banned her from speaking at plenary sessions for two meetings and participating in committee meetings for three sessions.

During the Gaza war, Gotliv called for the use of a nuclear Jericho missile, which she referred to as a "doomsday device", later saying "Only an explosion that shakes the Middle East will restore this country's dignity, strength, and security. It's time for a doomsday weapon shooting powerful missiles without limit. Not flattening a neighborhood, crushing and flattening Gaza."

Gotliv has also called for subjecting "the Gaza population" to "thirst and hunger" as a means to achieve military objectives, including the release of Israeli citizens held as hostages by Hamas. "Starvation as a Method of Warfare" is a war crime according to the Geneva Conventions. In May 2025, Gotliv reiterated her support for the starving Gaza, saying "There are no non-combatants in Gaza. Everyone is responsible. Right now, we don't have to give them any crumb or grain and I'm ready to be quoted all over the world. Which country feeds its enemies?"

In May 2024, after the United States delayed the delivery of precision missiles to Israel, Gotliv stated that Israel should instead use missiles which were imprecise and thus more destructive. "We have imprecise missiles! So maybe instead of using a precise missile to take out a specific room or a specific building, I'll use my imprecise missiles to flatten 10 buildings. That's what I'll do. If you don't give me precise missiles, I'll use imprecise missiles". Her comments were condemned by the United States Department of State as "absolutely deplorable."

An Israeli military base built at Beit Lid was invaded by right-wing protesters in July 2024 after the Israeli military police detained nine Israeli soldiers at Beit Lid for suspected abuse of a Palestinian prisoner; Gotliv protested outside the base.

In September 2024, she called for the arrest of the director of the Israeli human rights group B'Tselem, accusing her of “aiding the enemy” for speaking out before the UN Security Council.

In August 2025 on the Israeli Channel 14, Gotliv called for Israel to pursue a policy of vengeance against the Palestinians in the Gaza war, saying “I believe in the value of revenge.” Further expounding on her support of revenge, Gotliv called on Israel to "Wipe out the memory of Amalek!" The mention of Amalek refers to the biblical injunction to exterminate the Amalekites, which is interpreted by some Israelis to refer to the Palestinians.

== Controversy ==
Since her entry into the Knesset Gotliv has become known for making controversial statements, including a claim about an alleged meeting between the Mossad and Shikma Bressler, a leader in the protest movement against the government's proposed judicial reforms. She first promoted this claim on 3 October 2023, which was promptly denied by the Mossad.

In January 2024, she made a similar claim, according to which the Mossad intercepted a phone call between Shikma Bressler's husband and Yahya Sinwar days before the 2023 Hamas-led attack on Israel. The Mossad rejected her claim, calling it "recycled fake news" and accusing her of spreading conspiracy theories. Following the incident, Shin Bet chief Ronen Bar accused her of violating both criminal and civil law and harming national security, by publication of personal details of Shin Bet employees, which he stated endangered their lives and the lives of their families. In February 2024 Bressler announced she had filed a defamation suit against Gotliv for claiming that Bressler had "communicated with Hamas leader Yahya Sinwar before October 7." Prime Minister Benjamin Netanyahu also criticized Gotliv's claims as "false."

On another occasion she accused the Israel Defense Forces and Shin Bet of "working for terrorists."

In December 2025, Gotliv alleged in a speech before the Knesset that the former head of the Southern Region of the Israeli security agency, the Shin Bet, sent one of his officers to the Erez Crossing to meet with senior Hamas leader Izz al-Din al-Haddad on the night of 6 October at around 10 p.m. Gotliv claimed that the meeting took place just eight hours before the 7 October attacks.

The Attorney General of Israel, Gali Baharav-Miara, announced in May 2026 that charges of "disclosing and publishing classified information in violation of the General Security Service Law" would be filed against Gotliv as she had reportedly revealed the identity of an active Shin Bet operative in January 2024. Gotliv was able to request immunity as a member of the Knesset; a panel was formed by the House Committee of the Knesset to debate it and held its first meeting on 8 June. She believed that leaking the information was justifiable; Baharav-Miara showed the panel a document written by the Shin Bet contending that disclosing the information placed the Shin Bet's agent life at risk. The panel voted in favor of granting immunity by a vote of 11 to 3 on 15 June. The Knesset plenum voted on 17 June in favor of granting immunity to Gotliv, by a vote of 61 to 48 on the "grounds that Gotliv’s actions were carried out in the course of, or for the purpose of, fulfilling her duties as a member of Knesset", as well as by a vote of 62 to 48 "because the indictment was filed in bad faith or in a discriminatory manner." The Shin Bet officer who was exposed petitioned the High Court of Justice the same day.

Her immunity lapsed after the previous Knesset ended its term. She will have to reapply for immunity, but it is unlikely to be granted. Baharav-Miara is expected to issue another indictment against her once a permanent House Committee is formed.
