= Ayala Hasson =

Israeli journalist

- אילה חסון
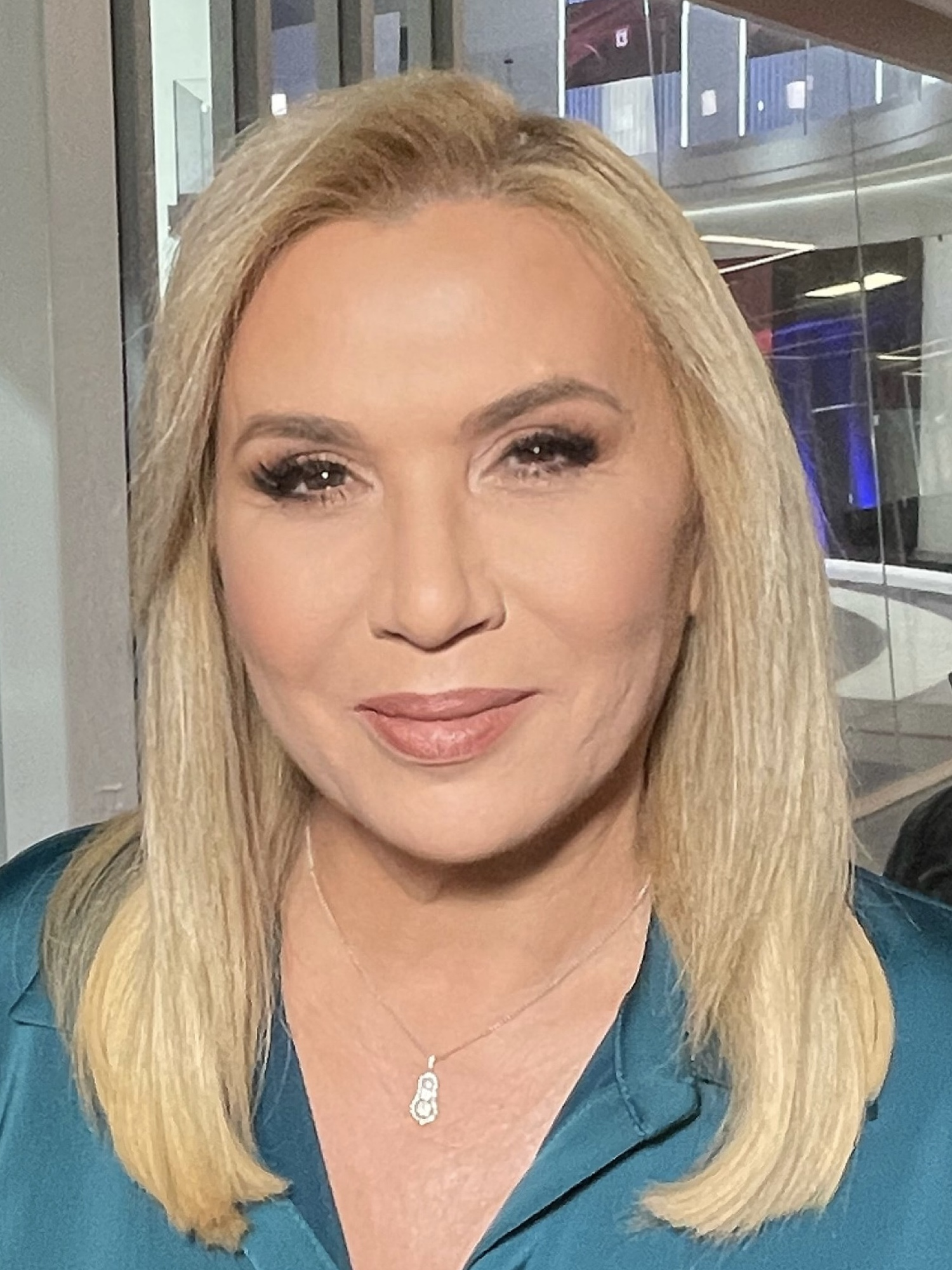
- Hasson in 2022
- Born: September 28, 1961 (age 64); Israel
- Education: Tel-Aviv University
- Occupations: Journalist; TV host
- Years active: 1993–present
- Spouse: Shai Nesher
- Children: 2

Ayala Hasson (Hebrew: אילה חסון; born September 1961) is an Israeli journalist. She is a television and radio presenter at the Israel Broadcasting Corporation. She spent most of her journalistic career at the Israel Broadcasting Authority, where she served as a reporter and commentator, presented HaKol Diburim ("All Talk") on Kol Israel and the Yoman ("Journal") edition on Channel 1, and was the first woman to become head of the channel's news division, which she occupied until her departure at the end of 2015. For several years she was a senior commentator on News 13, where she presented the editions of Shishi ("Friday") and HaMate HaMerkazi ("The Central Headquarters"), until she joined the corporation in 2023, where she broadcasts the daily program Sheva with Ayala Hasson ("Seven") on Kan 11 and Ha Boker Haze ("This Morning") on Thursdays on Kan 2.

Known for her investigative journalism, Hasson is responsible for exposing some of the most influential stories in Israeli politics, including the scandalous Bar-On–Hebron affair; the Shlomo Benizri bribery affair which led to his conviction; several scoops in the Harpaz affair; the indecent act of the head of the Israel Bar Association Avi Himi; hush money paid by Israel's National Library Chairman to his assistant after sexually harassing her; PM Bennett's household expenses, among others. Her notable interviews include one with Vladimir Putin.

Hasson has won several awards, including from the Movement for Quality Government in Israel, and was the highest-ranked journalist on Forbes Israel's list of "Most Powerful Women in Israel" in 2022.

== Biography ==
Hasson was born in Jerusalem and was raised in Talpiot neighborhood. She is a graduate of Tel Aviv University, where she finished her studies in the Koteret school of journalism. She is married to television producer Shai Nesher. The couple have a daughter, and she has another son from a previous marriage.

== Career ==
Her career started in 1993 in Maariv and later in the year was hired by the Israel Broadcasting Authority (IBA), where her first position was as a correspondent of criminal affairs for Channel 1. Her following positions on the channel were political reporter and later state commentator. Among the shows she hosted was the Thursday radio program HaKol Diburim ("All Talk") on Kol Israel and the popular Friday TV magazine Yoman ("Journal"), which was the most-watched show on the channel.

In 2014, she was the first woman to become head of the channel's news division, which she occupied until her departure at the end of 2015. She left the IBS in 2015 and moved to Channel 10 (later Channel 13), and later explained that her departure was the result of harassment she faced when she found out about corruption affairs in the IBA and sought to expose them. Until 2023, she was a senior commentator on News 13, where she presented the Friday and Saturday editions of Shishi ("Friday") and HaMate HaMerkazi ("The Central Headquarters"), respectively. She returned to public broadcasting when she joined the Israeli Public Broadcasting Corporation (IPBC) in 2023, where she broadcasts the daily program Sheva with Ayala Hasson ("Seven") on Kan 11 and Ha Boker Haze ("This Morning") on Thursdays on Kan 2.

== Journalistic achievements ==
Known for her investigative journalism, Hasson is responsible for exposing some of the most influential stories in Israeli politics: including the following:

- The Bar-On–Hebron affair in 1997, among the most scandalous affairs in Israeli politics, where Hasson exposed a conspiracy involving Prime Minister Benjamin Netanyahu and the Shas ultra-Orthodox political party for the appointment of Roni Bar-On as the office's Attorney General in an attempt to lessen the plea bargain in Arie Deri's trial in exchange for Shas party's support of the Hebron agreement),
- The Shlomo Benizri (Minister of Labor and Social Welfare) bribery affair in 2002 which led to his conviction two years later. Hasson presented documents and testimony that he used his ministerial authority to assist a contractor, and the latter gave him presents amounting to 800,000 ILS.
- The scandalous recording of Minister of Energy Yosef Paritzky from Shinui Party headed by Abraham Poraz, where Paritzky was heard attempting to fabricate a case against Poraz in order to bring to Poraz's downfall. Following the report, Paritzky was removed from office.
- Several scoops in the Harpaz affair, where she reported that Gabi Ashkenazi, Commander-in-Chief of the Israel Defense Forces, was gathering information against his rivals in the political echelon.
- Hush money paid by Israel's National Library Chairman to his assistant after sexually harassing her.
- Prime Minister Bennett's household expenses, including the adjustment of his private home in Ra'anana to turn it into the PM's official residence, which cost millions of shekels.
- The indecent act committed by the head of the Israel Bar Association Avi Himi in a Zoom meeting with a female lawyer, for whom he had written a letter of recommendation in support of her appointment for a judicial position.
- Her notable interviews include one with Vladimir Putin.
- Following the surprise attack on Israel (2023), Hasson revealed a presentation titled "Jericho Wall" that was prepared by the intelligence of the Gaza Division and presented in May 2022 to the head of the Israeli Military Intelligence Aharon Haliva and the commander of the Southern Command Eliezer Toledano. According to Hasson, the presentation outlined a strategy for taking control of southern towns and bases; an updated version of it was presented again in August 2023. Hasson's revelatory report was followed up by The New York Times and Washington Post days later.
