= Peli =

== People ==
Peli is an Italian, Hebrew, and Elamite (sur)name. Notable people with the (sur)name include:

- Alexander Peli (1915–2007), Ukrainian-Jewish encyclopedist
- Bracha Peli (1892–1986), Israeli publisher
- Giora Peli (1936–2020), Israeli chess player
- Lorenzo Peli (born 2000), Italian football player
- Oren Peli (born 1970), Israeli film director
- Peli (king of Awan) (c. 2600 BC), Elamite ruler
- Pinchas Hacohen Peli (1930–1989), Israeli rabbi
- Santo Peli (born 1949), Italian historian

== Other uses ==
- Peli, a brand name deployed by Pelican Products within Europe
