= Prawer =

Prawer is a surname. Notable people with the surname include:

- Joshua Prawer (1917–1990), Israeli historian
- Ruth Prawer Jhabvala (1927–2013), German-born British and American author and screenwriter
- Siegbert Salomon Prawer (1925–2012), German-born British professor of German literature at Oxford
