= Jerusalem–Khan railway station =

Former railway station in Israel

Coordinates: 31°46′0.66″N 35°13′28.96″E

Jerusalem railway station תחנת הרכבת ירושלים محطة قدس شريف
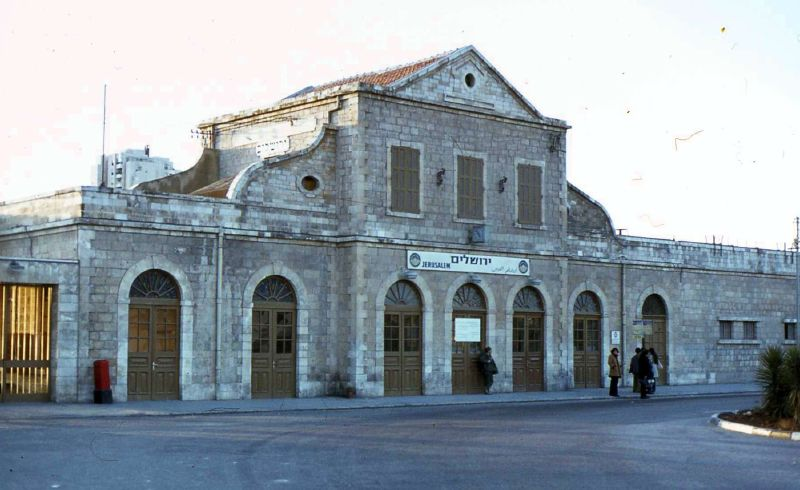
- Jerusalem railway station in 1978

General information
- Location: David Remez Street, Jerusalem
- Line: Tel Aviv – Jerusalem
- Platforms: 2 (original station); 2 (revived station)
- Tracks: 4 (original station); 4 (revived station)

Construction
- Structure type: Surface-level station (original station); Deep-level pylon two-vault station (revived station)
- Depth: Ground level (original station); 42 metres (138 ft) (revived station)

History
- Opened: 26 September 1892; 134 years ago
- Closed: 15 August 1998; 28 years ago
Location

The Jerusalem railway station (Hebrew: תחנת הרכבת ירושלים, Tahanat HaRakevet Yerushalayim; Arabic: محطة قدس شريف) is a historic railway station in Jerusalem, located between Hebron Road and Bethlehem Road, near the German Colony. It is also known as the Jerusalem–Khan railway station (Hebrew: תחנת הרכבת ירושלים – החאן, Tahanat HaRakevet Yerushalayim–HaKhan) after the caravanserai building, now the Khan Theater located across the road, to differentiate it from the Jerusalem–Malha and Jerusalem–Yitzhak Navon stations opened after its closure. It served as the eastern terminus of the Jaffa–Jerusalem railway until its closure in 1998.

The station opened in 1892 during the Ottoman period at an elevation of 787 metres (2,582 ft) on the 86.6 kilometer mark of the Jaffa–Jerusalem line. In 1998 this railway along with the station were closed and the station was not included in the restoration of the Tel Aviv – Jerusalem line, completed in 2005, at which point Jerusalem–Malha station became the line's eastern terminus. Following its closure, the station lay neglected for many years, although the railway yard was used for annual events such as the Hebrew Book Week. After undergoing an extensive restoration, it reopened as a culture and entertainment center in May 2013.

A new, completely-underground railway station is expected to open at the site by the mid-2030s. Instead of the original Jaffa–Jerusalem railway, this new station will be served by a new underground railway extending from the future Jerusalem–Central railway station located to the northwest.

== History ==
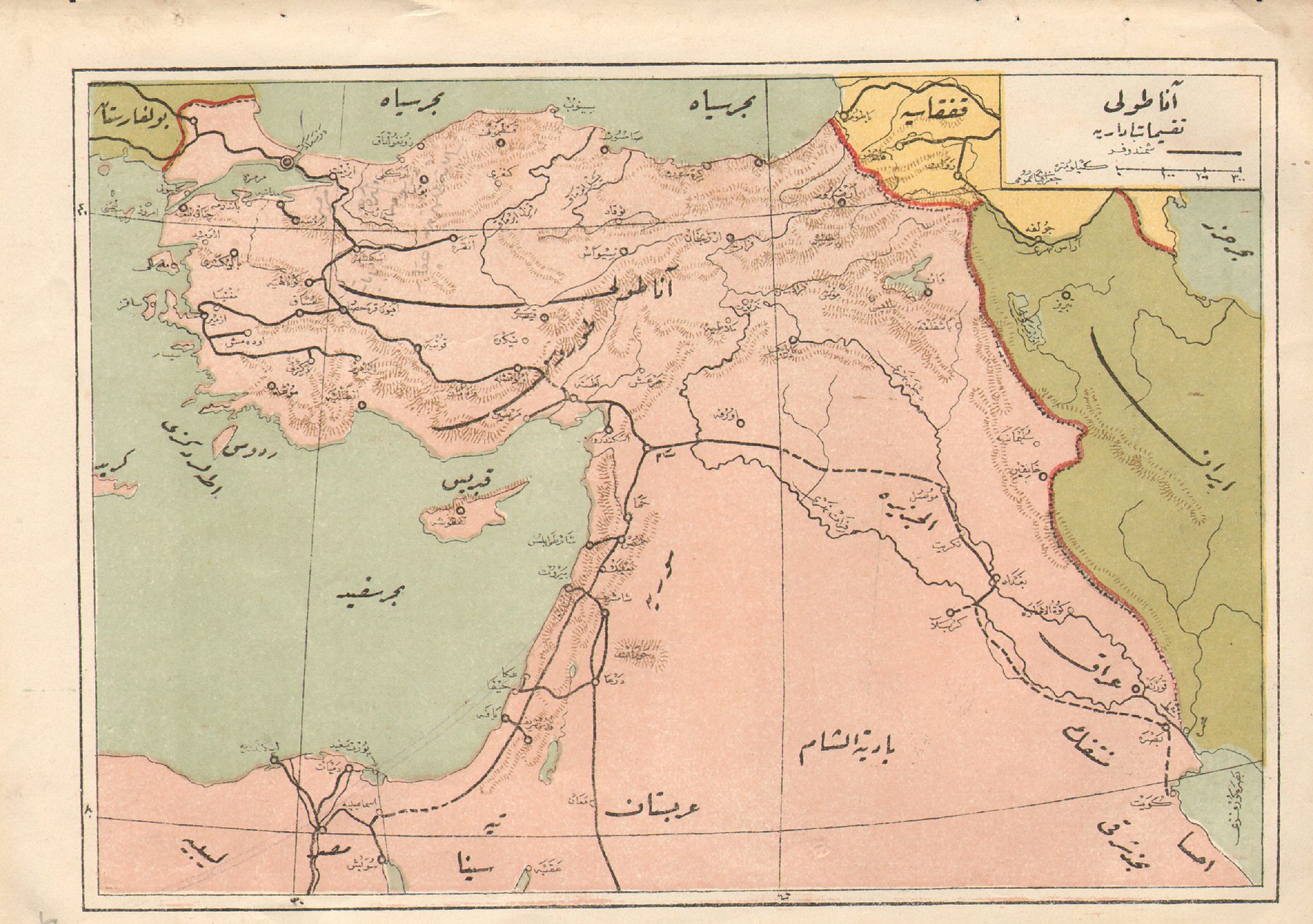
Map showing the Ottoman railways on the eve of World War I

The idea to build a railway linking the coast with the Jerusalem was first raised in the middle of the 19th century by Dr. Conrad Schick, Moses Montefiore and others. The franchise for laying the railway was obtained from the Ottoman government by Joseph Navon, but due to financial difficulties, he had to sell the franchise to a French company which was set up to build the line – Société du Chemin de Fer Ottoman de Jaffa à Jérusalem et Prolongements.

In 1892, construction of the line from Jaffa to Jerusalem was finally completed. It was built along the "donkeys' trail", an ancient route ascending to Jerusalem which passed through Nahal Sorek and the Valley of Rephaim. The station was inaugurated on 26 September 1892 in the presence of the city's dignitaries, Jews and Arabs. Among those present at the ceremony was Eliezer Ben Yehuda, the reviver of the Hebrew language, which gave the train the literal name of – horse of the steel in Hebrew as the word Rakevet had not yet been created.

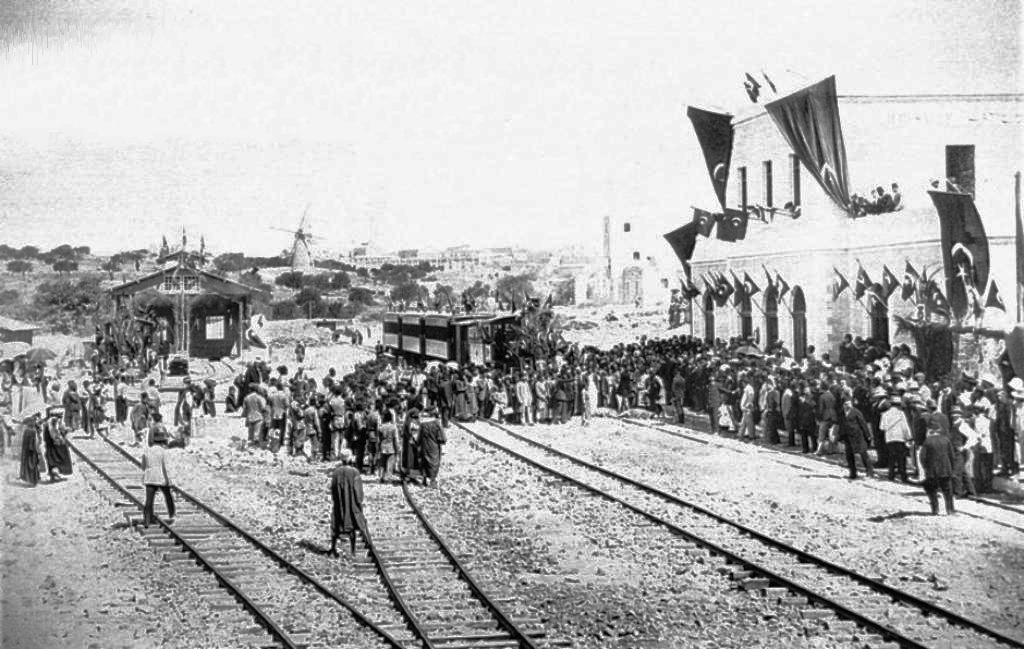
Opening ceremony of 1892, with the mill built by Moses Montefiore in the background.

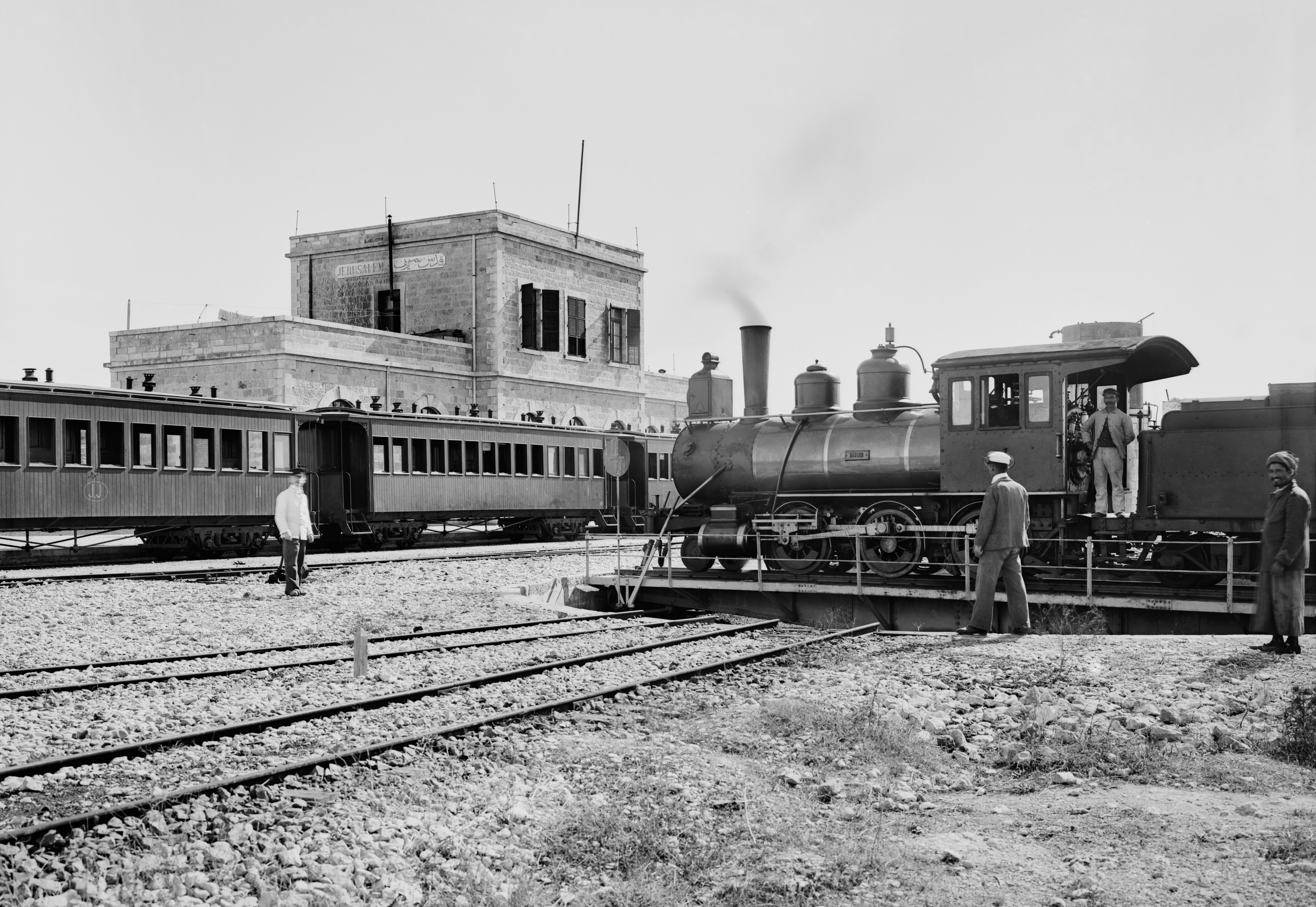
Jerusalem railway station, c. 1900.

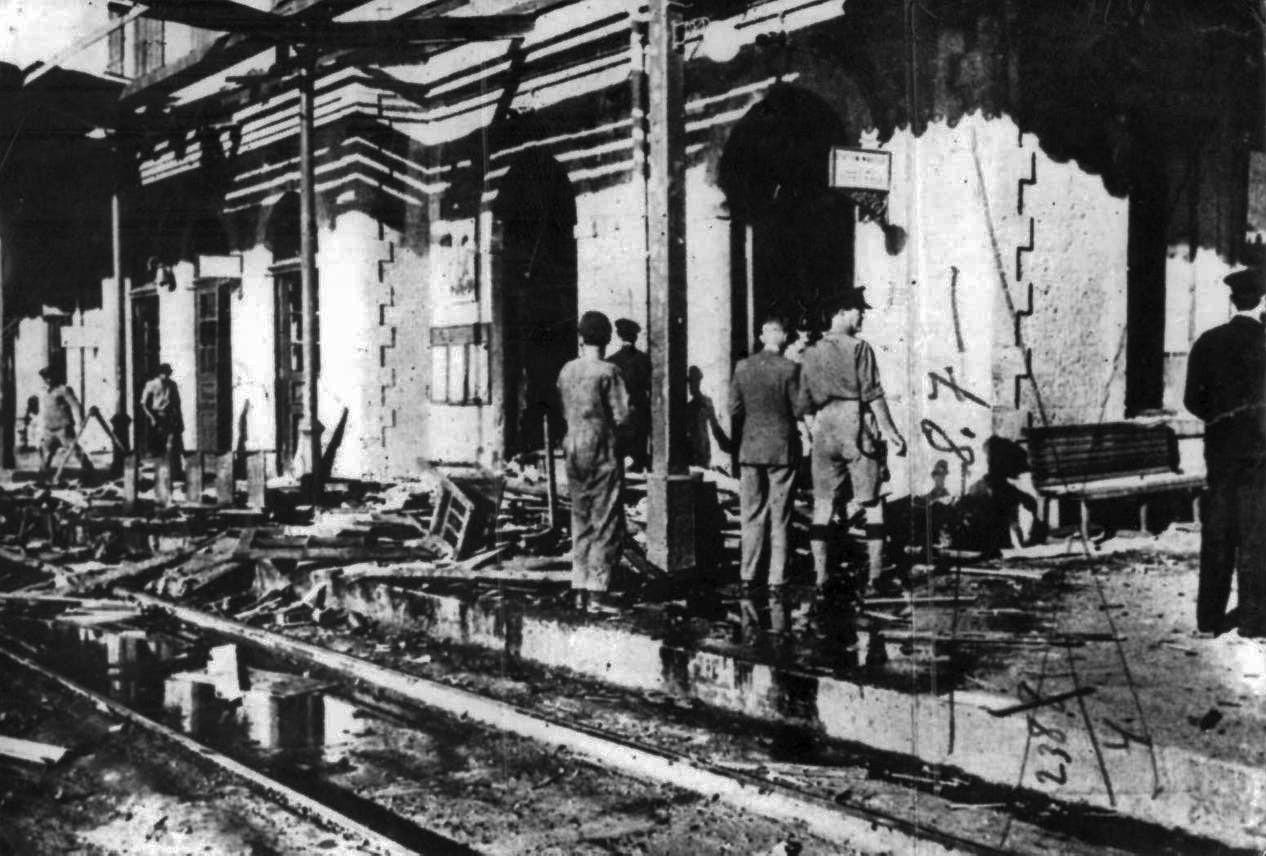
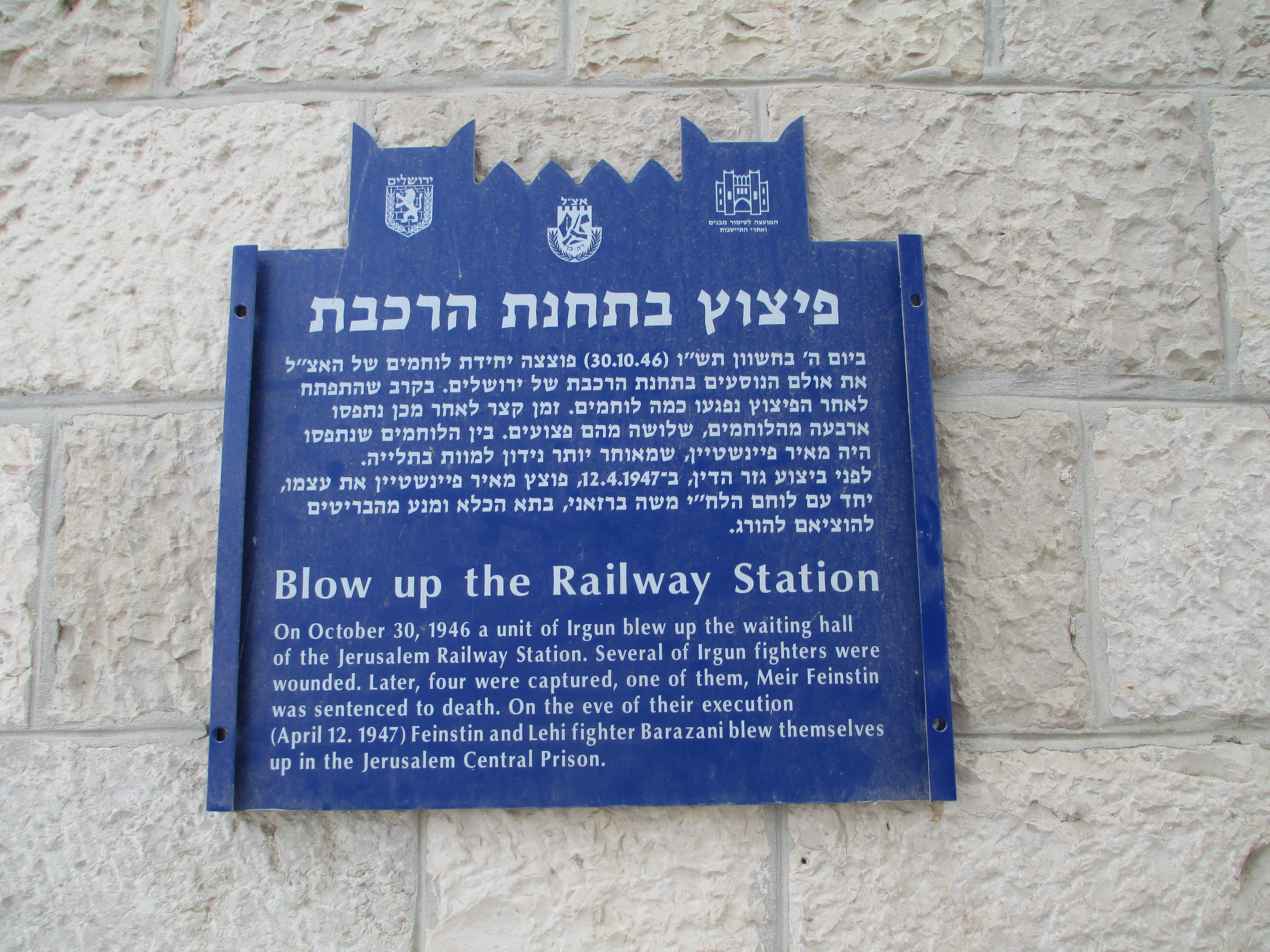
Left: Damage caused to Jerusalem railway station by an Irgun suitcase bomb. One of the militants involved blew himself up in prison 6 months later, after being sentenced to death for the train station bombing. Right: Plaque at the train station about the bombing and the suicides afterwards. Note: "12 April" a misprint, other sources all say the militants blew themselves up on the night of 21‑22 April 1947.

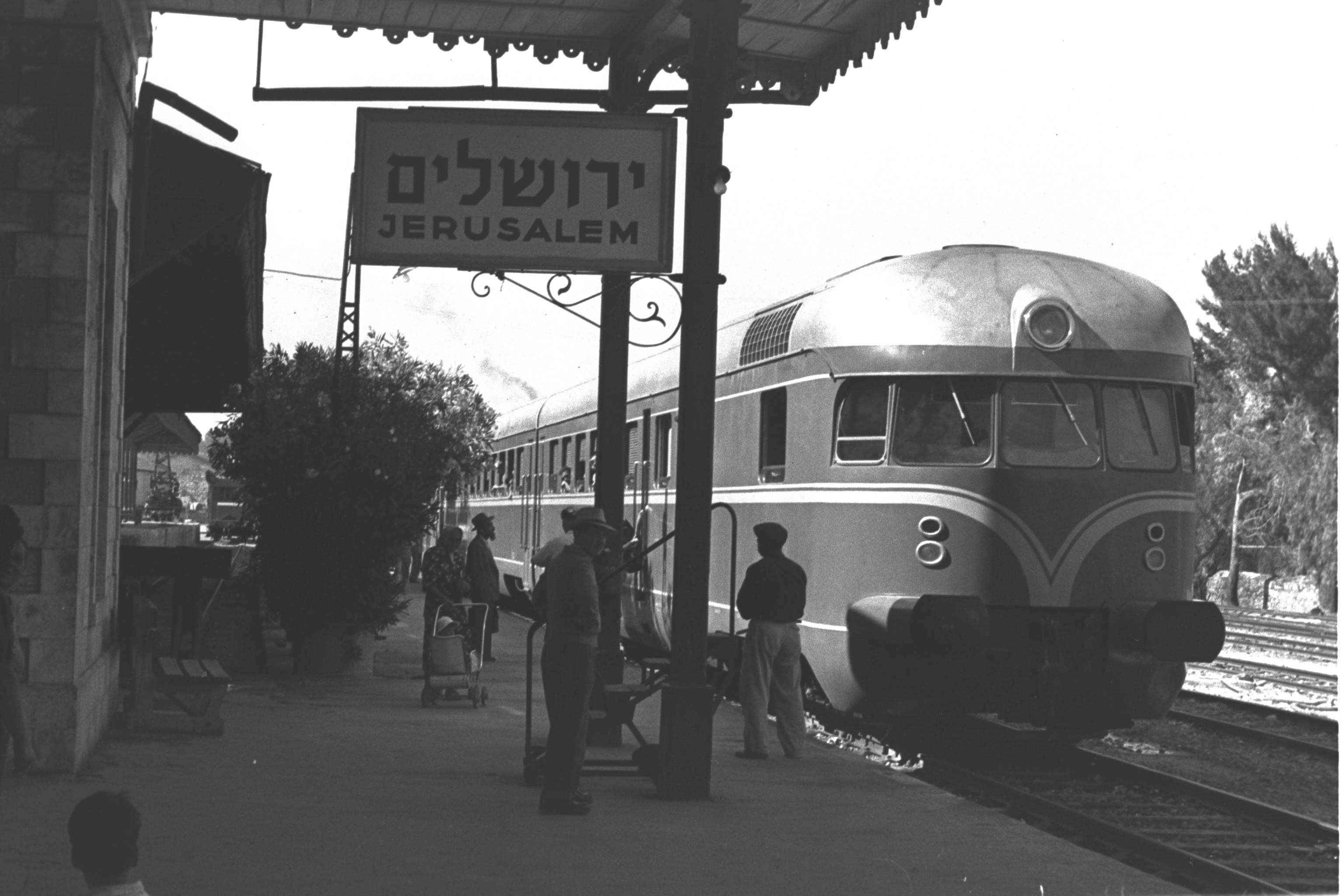
Jerusalem railway station, 1956.

On 30 October 1946 an Irgun suitcase bomb caused severe damage to the station. A British sapper was killed while attempting to defuse the bomb. Five of the militants were captured by police, four of them were wounded. One of the injured was 17-year-old Meir Feinstein. according to his older brother, Benjamin Feinstein, Meir required the amputation of his arm as a result of delayed medical attention in prison. Both captured militants were initially sentenced death. However, neither were executed. The older militant, Daniel Azuli, had his sentence comuted. The teenage amputee, Meir Feinstein, blew himself up in prison 6 months later, alongside Moshe Barazani, a Lehi militant who had also been sentenced to death for "terrorism" and who was held in the same death row cell. The pair used concealed hand grenades that had been constructed by Eliezer Ben-Ami, another Lehi militant held at the same prison. Meir and Moshe were buried at the Mount of Olives Jewish Cemetery, the Irgun commander and his wife were later buried next to them. Ben-Ami was released from prison and joined the IDF, after Israel declared independence. (Note: Eliezer Ben-Ami (Hebrew: אליעזר בן-עמי) also known as Eliezer Reznitsky (Hebrew: אליעזר רזניצקי). He originally enlisted in Israel's military using his girlfriend's surname.)

The station operated almost continuously until 1948, when traffic stopped on the Jaffa–Jerusalem line due to the 1948 Arab–Israeli War. At the end of the war a section of the track near Beit Safafa, an Arab neighborhood in southeastern Jerusalem, remained under the control of the Jordanian Arab Legion. Following the 1949 Armistice Agreements, it was agreed that Jordan would hand the control of this section of the track to Israel, in order to enable Israel Railways to restart the service to Jerusalem.

As a result, between 1948 and 1967 the Beit Safafa neighborhood was divided; the area south of the railway line was part of the Jordanian controlled West Bank and the railway line itself and small area to the North part of the Israeli controlled section of Jerusalem. The service on the line resumed on 7 August 1949.

In 1959 the railway tracks to Jerusalem underwent extensive renovations, but over time, the number of passengers using the line decreased, especially after the opening of Highway 1. For the majority of the years until the line was finally closed, there was only once or twice daily service to Tel Aviv South railway station (now also closed) and / or Haifa Center (now Center HaShmona) railway station. During the 1990s, due to the poor level of railway tracks maintenance, there were many minor derailments; therefore it was decided to close the section of the Jaffa–Jerusalem railway line from Beit Shemesh railway station along Nahal Sorek to Jerusalem. On 14 August 1998 the last train service left the station, and on 15 August 1998 the station was officially closed. The Beit Shemesh–Jerusalem section was later renovated and reopened in 2005, but only reached the Malha neighborhood, with the railway between the newly-built Malha railway station and the original Jerusalem station having been abandoned. The section from Malha to Beit Shemesh was closed again in 2020 following the COVID-19 pandemic, citing poor ridership and long journey times (especially compared to the new Tel Aviv-Jerusalem railway) and the railway's long, winding course causing excessive damage to train axles.

== The station building ==
The station building is a symmetrical structure containing the station offices, ticket hall and a Concourse. The original building (before later modifications) was identical to the Jaffa railway station building and the original Ramla railway station building, which were all built at the same time. The triangular arches on the roof of the first floor, on both sides of the ticket hall, were built in early 1920s by the British-run Palestine Railways, who managed the railway during the British Mandate of Palestine. The building underwent many renovations over the years, but its basic shape has not changed since 1920.

== Restoration and reopening as an entertainment venue ==
After its closure, the station sat abandoned and suffered from neglect and vandalism. In the 2000s, the area around the station was used for cultural events such as the Jerusalem Film Festival, Jerusalem Jazz Festival and Israel Festival.

In May 2013, the station reopened as HaTakhana HaRishona ("The First Station"), a culture and entertainment venue. The $9.3 million refurbishment was financed by the Jerusalem Municipality and the Jerusalem Development Authority. The 4,000 sq.m. rail yard now features wooden decks, food stalls and umbrella-topped vendor carts. Several restaurants and pubs have opened in the area, and an exhibition of historic photographs is displayed inside the station house. The site hosts musical, literary and artistic events, and adjoins a bike path that links it to the Train Track Park, a walking and cycling path built along the route of the old train tracks. The line's other original terminus, the Jaffa train station, also underwent a similar restoration which was completed in 2009. In 2017, the Railway Station compound resumed hosting the Hebrew Book Week, after having moved between various locations in the city, and has hosted it there ever since.

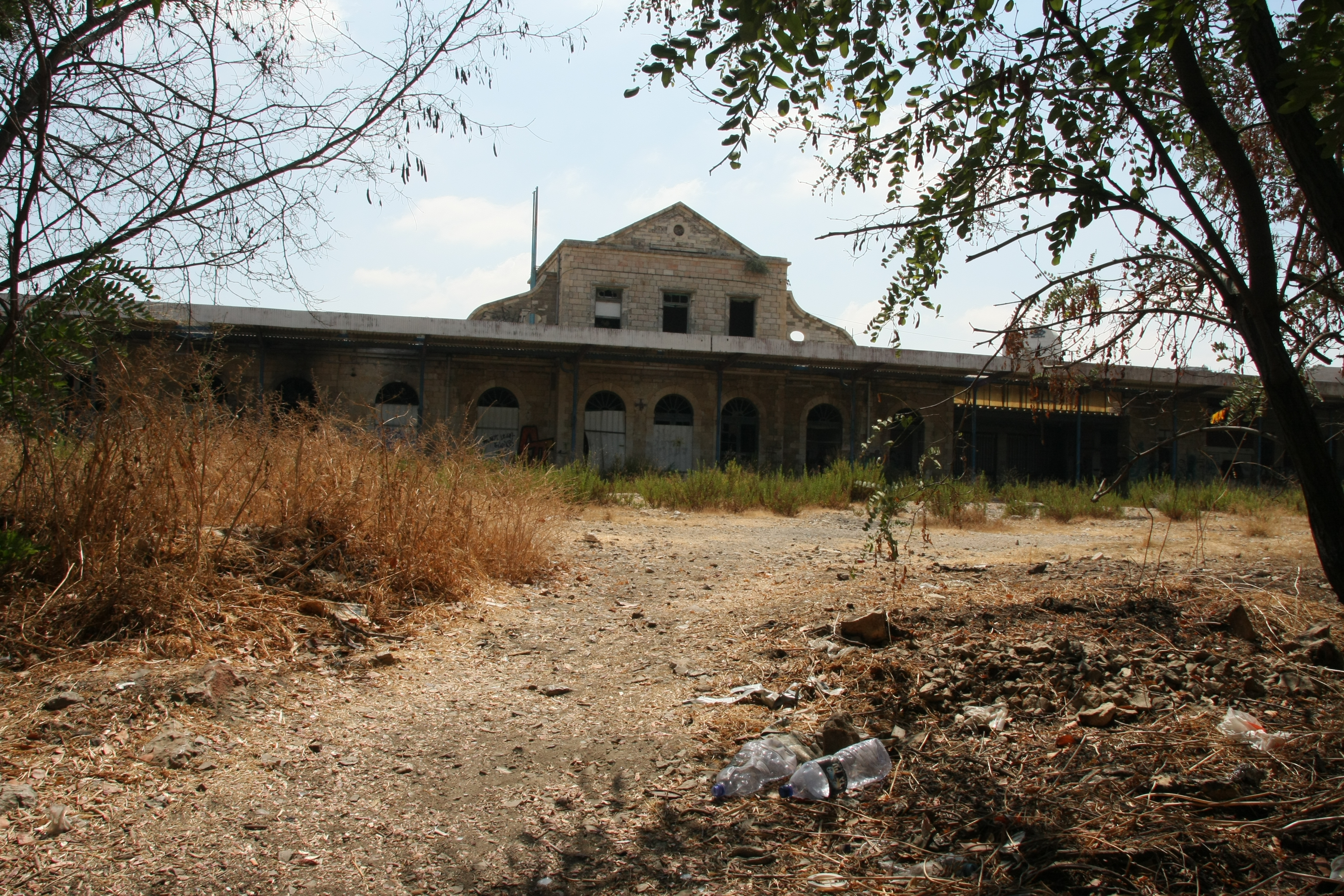
Jerusalem railway station in 2008 before being extensively restored.

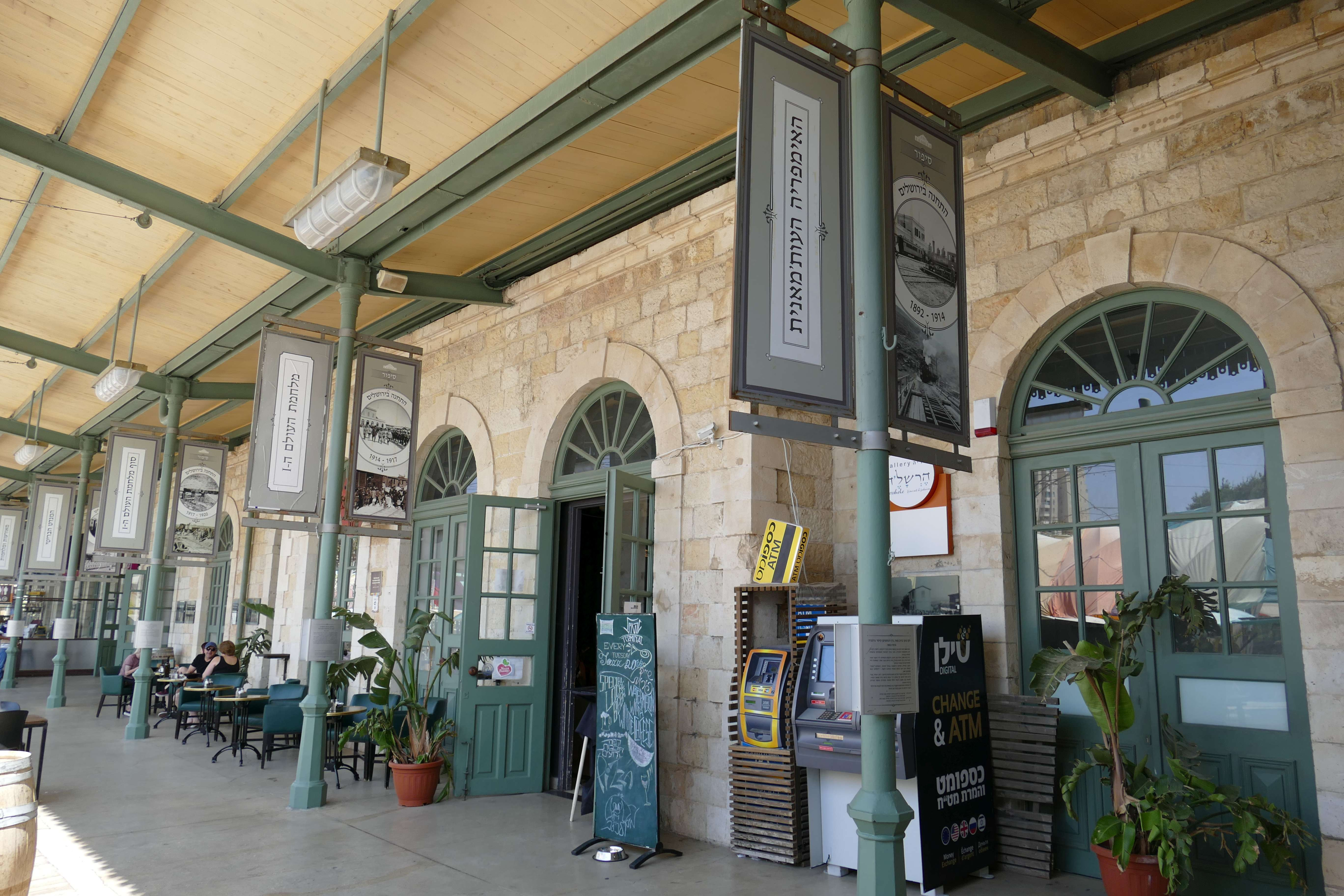
After restoration as a leisure and entertainment venue.

== Future railway station ==
The station is expected to return to active railway service as part of National Infrastructure Plan 108, which provides for the extension of the New Tel Aviv–Jerusalem railway from Jerusalem–Yitzhak Navon railway station (the current terminus) via a completely new underground station in central Jerusalem to Jerusalem Khan. Due to engineering constraints, the revived Khan station would be built in a shallow underground structure and would be designed as a future through station, enabling the possibility of someday reviving the old railway alignment to the southwest to Malha station, albeit in a new, mostly-underground route.

Detailed plans unveiled in November 2021 foresee that the Station's platforms will be located 42 meters underground. The historical station structure's roof will be restored to its original dimensions, but it will remain an entertainment venue; the main entrance to the new underground station will be built in an adjacent glass structure. Two secondary entrances will be built, one north of the station complex in Liberty Bell Park, and the other facing Hebron Road, in the extreme south of the station lot.

Like the existing Navon station, as well as the planned Jerusalem-Central station, the revived Jerusalem-Khan will have two underground island platforms servicing four tracks. Each Island platform will be built in a vault, and thanks to its shallower depth, both vaults will be linked by direct overpasses to escalators and elevators leading to the surface; as opposed to Jerusalem-Navon's structure, where the surface escalators and elevators only lead to a central vault, from which overpasses extend to the platforms.

The future Blue Line of the Jerusalem Light Rail is planned to have a stop at the station.

== Gallery ==
Modern photos of the original signage in three languages.

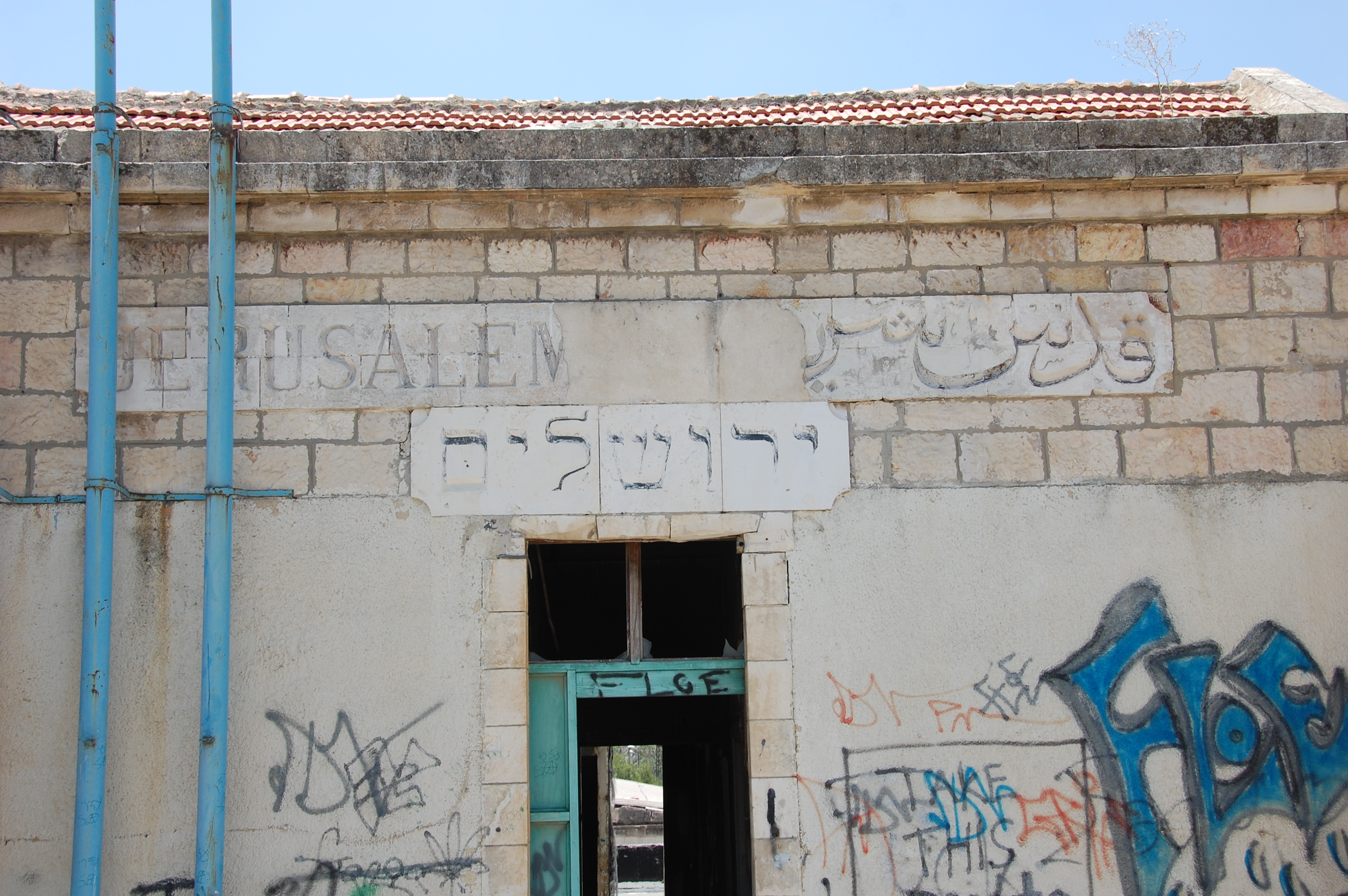

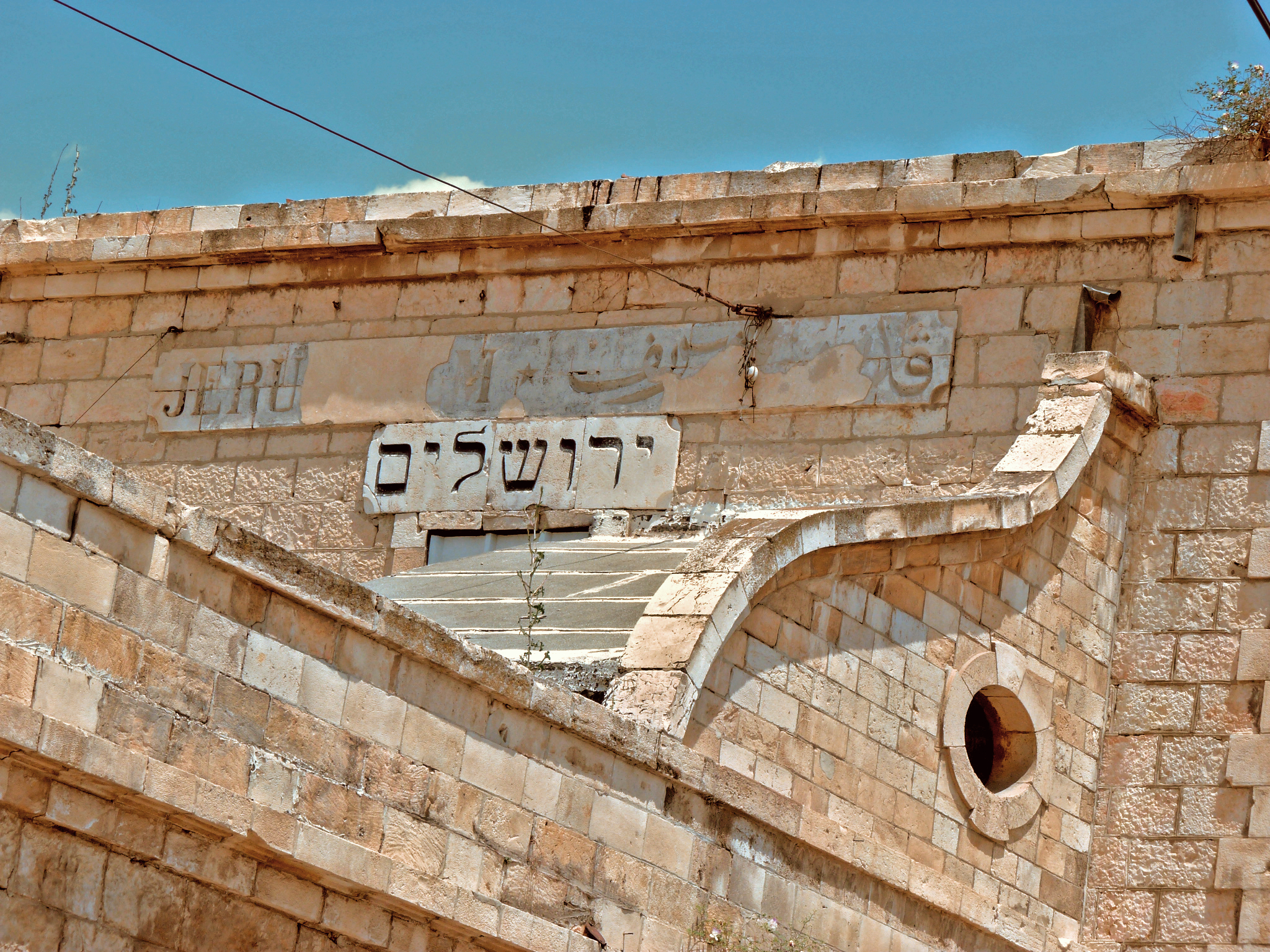

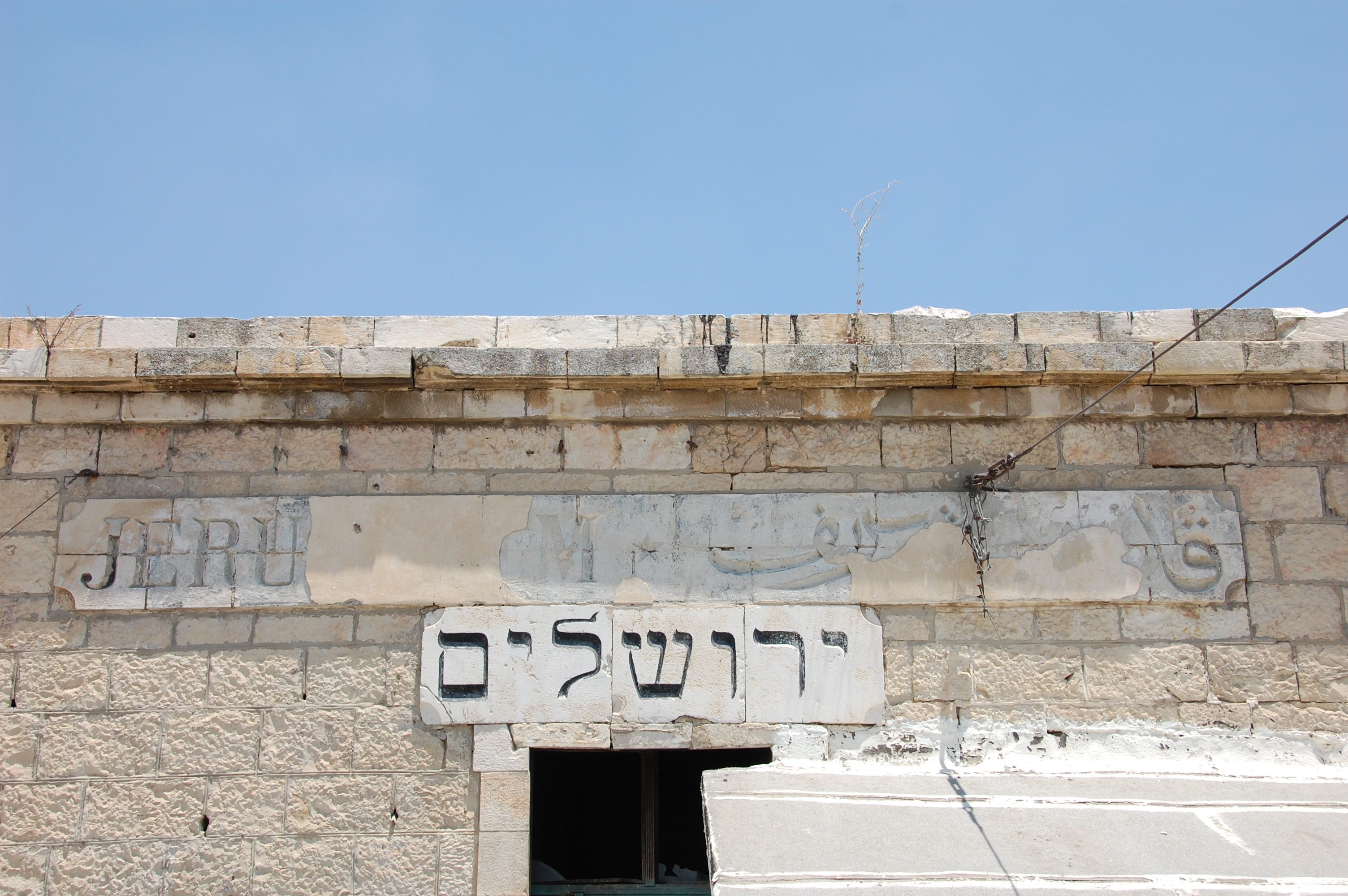
Historical photos of the station.

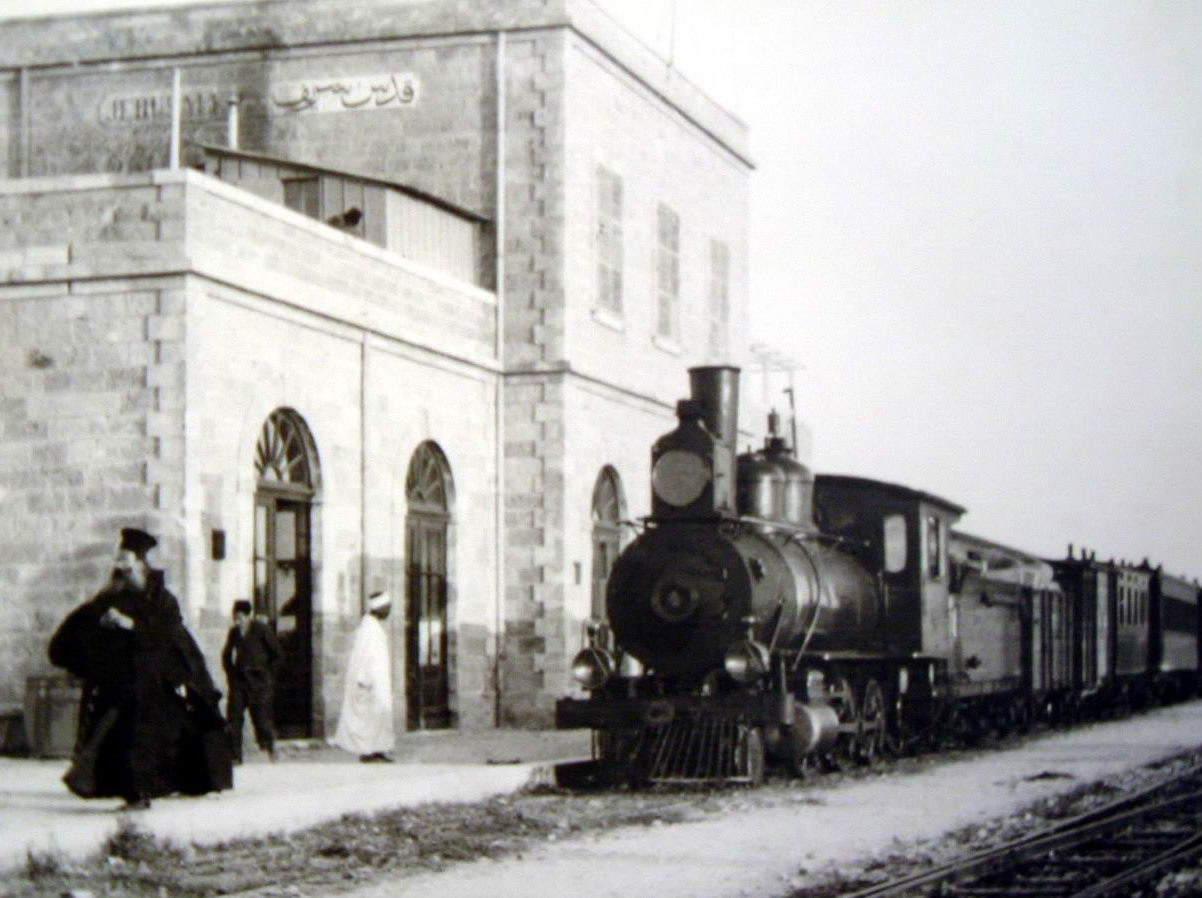
Historic photo of the station

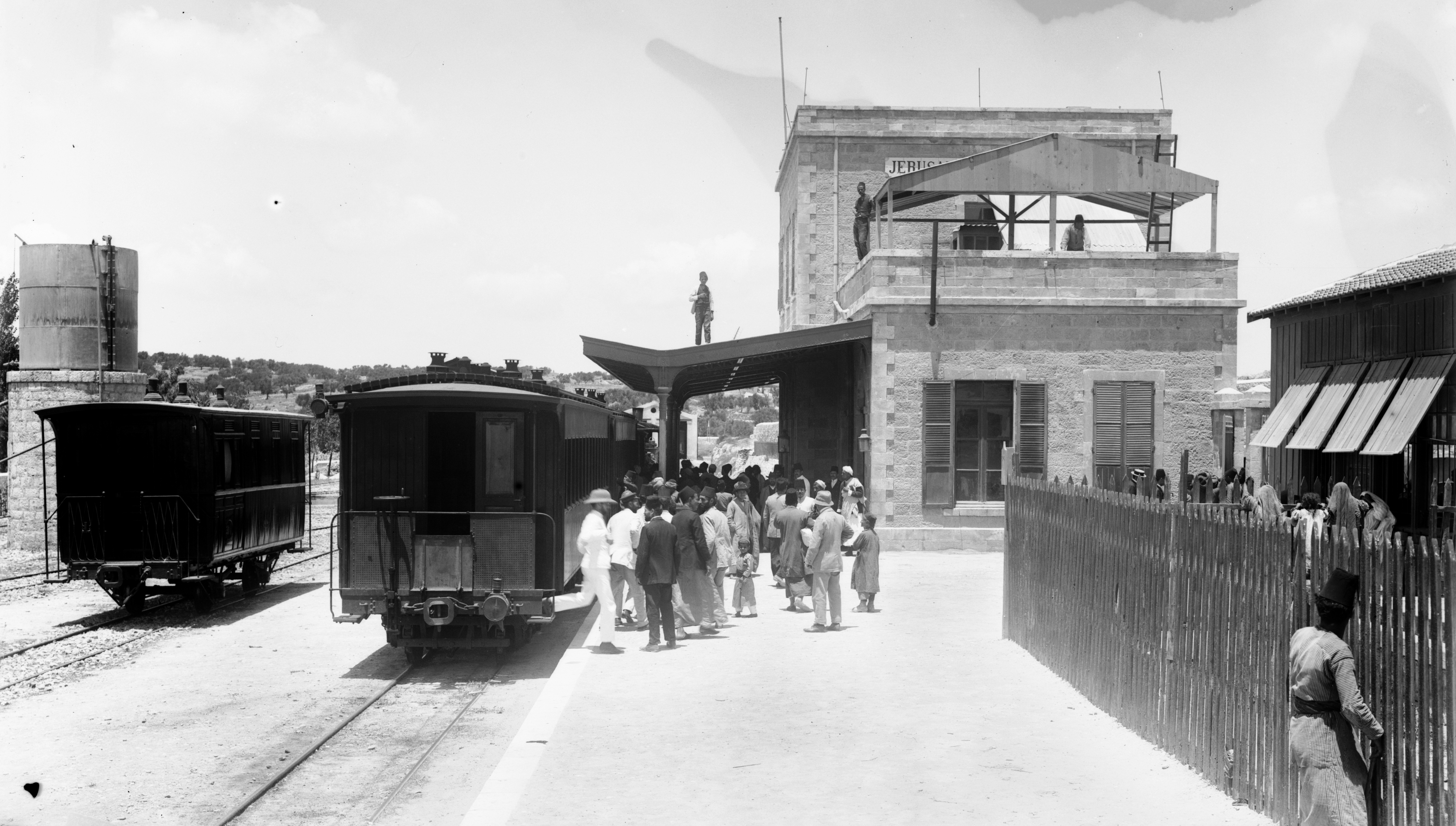
The station in the early 20th century

== See also ==
- Ramla railway station
- Jaffa railway station
- Conrad Schick
