= Efi Nave =

Israeli lawyer (born 1968)

- אפי נווה
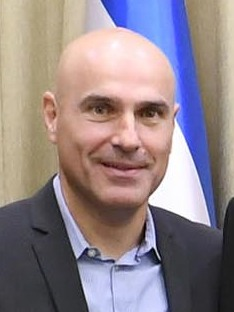

Chairman of the Israel Bar Association
- In office June 2015 – February 2019
- Preceded by: Doron Barzilay
- Succeeded by: Avi Himi

Personal details
- Born: 15 December 1968 (age 57) Ashkelon, Israel
- Education: Ramot College, Tel Aviv University

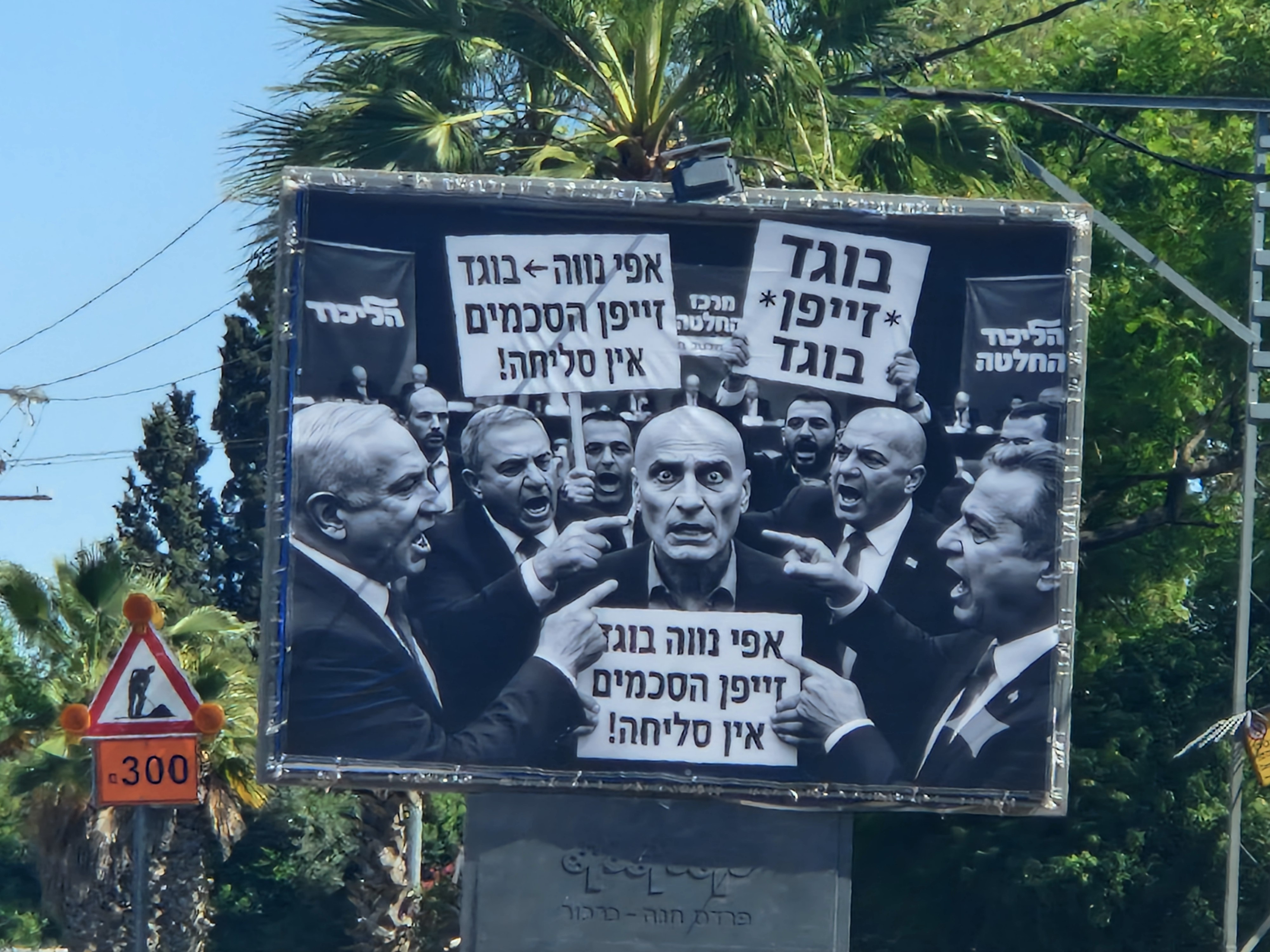
Billboards against Efi Nave on Pardes Hanna-Karkur roads

Ephraim "Efi" Nave (Hebrew: אפי נווה; born 15 December 1968) is an Israeli lawyer who served as chairman of the Israel Bar Association between 2015 and 2019. He previously served as chairman of the Bar Association's Ethics Committee in the Central Israel district, as well as the district's chair.

On 13 June 2017, Nave was elected to serve on the Judicial Selection Committee by the Bar Association. He served between January and December 2018, when he resigned after being indicted for illegally smuggling a female acquaintance out of the country. Nave was convicted of the crime in September 2022.

On 16 January 2019, Nave was arrested and investigated for allegedly receiving sexual bribes in exchange for a judicial appointment. Following the arrest, Nave resigned as chairman of the Israel Bar Association. On 21 March 2021, Israel's Deputy State Attorney decided not to indict Nave over the scandal.

In April 2025, Nave announced his intention to seek election to the Knesset in the 2026 Israeli legislative election as a member of Likud.

== Biography ==
Efi Nave was born in Ashkelon to Iraqi Jewish parents. In 1987, Nave enlisted in the Israel Defense Forces, serving in the Armored Corps. Nave was reassigned to Mamram after experiencing a road accident.

In 2006, Nave became chairman of the ethics committee of the Israel Bar Association's Tel Aviv and Central Israel district. In June 2011, Nave was elected the district's chairman.

=== Chairman of the Israel Bar Association ===
In June 2015, Nave was elected Chairman of the Israel Bar Association, defeating the incumbent Doron Barzilay and lawyer Tally Gotliv.

In January 2017, Nave sued journalist Sharon Sphurer for defamation after she published articles alleging that Nave gave preferential treatment to his allies and former donors while choosing lawyers for arbitration cases that were referred to the Bar Association. The court ruled in Sphurer's favor in September 2019 and ordered Nave to pay Sphurer NIS 70,000.

Nave resigned as chairman in January 2019 and was replaced by Avi Himi. In June 2023, Nave ran for another term as chairman. He received 19% of the vote, losing to Amit Becher.

== Controversies ==
=== Criminal convictions ===
In 2018, Israeli police launched a criminal investigation against Nave on suspicions that he committed Fraud and smuggled a female acquaintance, Bar Katz, through Israeli border control. Nave confessed to the crime during an investigation, and was indicted alongside Katz on 25 December. That day, he announced his intention to resign from Israel's Judicial Selection Committee, of which he had been a member. Nave claimed the indictment was politically motivated, and stemmed from his opposition to the appointment of State Attorney Shai Nitzan.

In September 2022, Nave and Katz were convicted of Fraud and Illegal entry and departure, and in November, Nave was sentenced to two months of probation and an NIS 2,000 fine. The Central Israel District Court denied an appeal by both Katz and Nave.

=== Corruption charges ===
In January 2019, Nave was arrested on suspicions of accepting sexual bribes in exchange for Judicial Appointments. In December 2019, Nave and judge Eti Kraif were indicted on charges of bribery by the State Attorney.

Following his arrest, Nave filed a complaint with Israeli police for breach of privacy after it was discovered that the investigation started from evidence taken from a cellphone belonging to Nave, which was acquired by Army Radio journalist Hadas Shtief and unlocked with the help of a private investigator. Nave additionally sued Army Radio and Shtief for NIS 7 Million for the breach. In May, he requested an additional NIS 141,000 in compensation from Shtief for defamation, alleging she used derogatory language in her stories on Nave, including referring to him as a "Garbage worm".

On 21 March 2021, Israel's Deputy State Attorney decided to avoid indicting Nave over the scandal, stating that Shtief's evidence was acquired improperly and was therefore inadmissible in court.

In March 2024, Haaretz published recordings of Nave in which he agreed to support Eitan Orenstein's bid for the Presidency of a District Court in exchange for judicial favors and appointments. In April, additional recordings surfaced in which then Justice Minister Ayelet Shaked agreed to promote Orenstein's appointment in exchange for favors from Nave.

== Personal life ==
Nave is married, resides in Tel Aviv and has eight children, two from his current wife and six from the previous.
