= Bar-On–Hebron affair =

Political scandal in Israel

The Bar-On–Hebron affair was a political scandal in Israel following a series of events starting from the appointment of Roni Bar-On as the Attorney General of Israel in January 1997. The appointment evoked great scrutiny from jurists and politicians as Bar-On, a lawyer with no particular experience, was considered unqualified for the position, which he resigned from two days following his appointment. The event culminated when ten days later Channel 1 correspondent Ayala Hasson reported that Bar-On's appointment was part of a conspiracy, namely a secret deal between Prime Minister Benjamin Netanyahu and former Minister of Interior Affairs Aryeh Deri, head of the religious party Shas, who was facing trial on corruption charges and allegedly seeking a favorable plea bargain. According to Hasson, Bar-On's candidacy was proposed to Deri by the Israeli businessman David Appel, believing that Bar-On as Attorney General would ensure a plea bargain for Deri. The appointment was thus pushed by Deri in exchange for Shas party's support of the controversial Hebron agreement, which Deri threatened to bring down if Bar-On was not appointed.

The affair created a furor in the Israeli media and public as well as political sphere. A police investigation was opened and its conclusion recommended that charges be brought against all involved. Eventually Deri was the only one indicted. Appel's libel case against Hasson was rejected in 2004.
