= Encyclopaedia Hebraica =

Hebrew-language encyclopedia

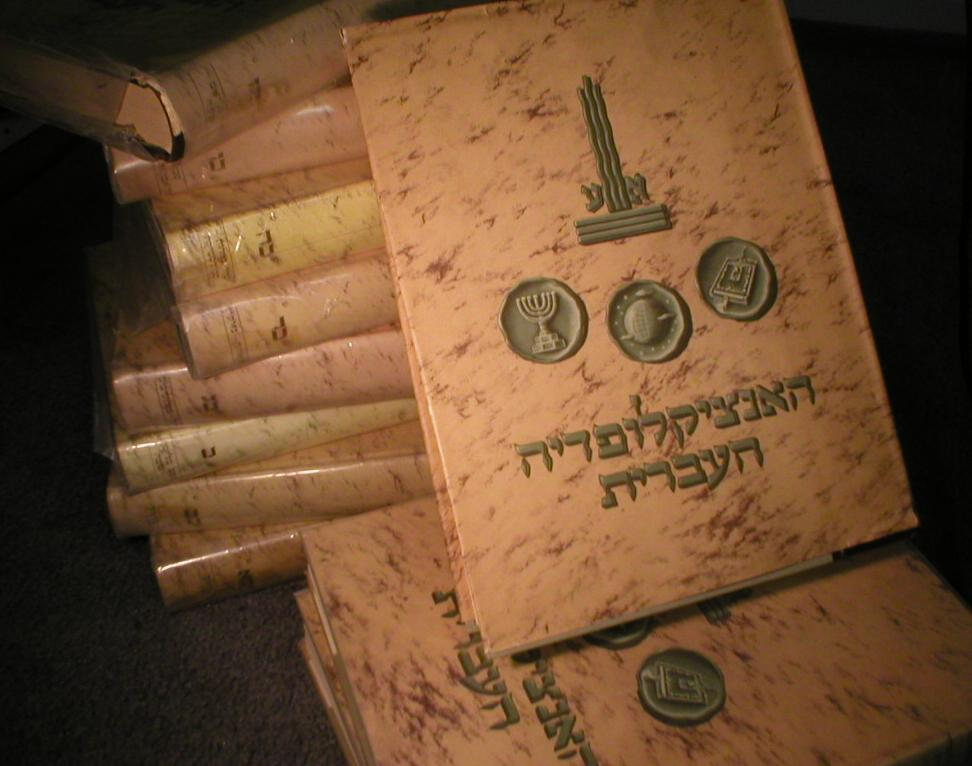
Stack of volumes. The large Hebrew letters on the lower end of the spine indicate the volume number in gematriya.

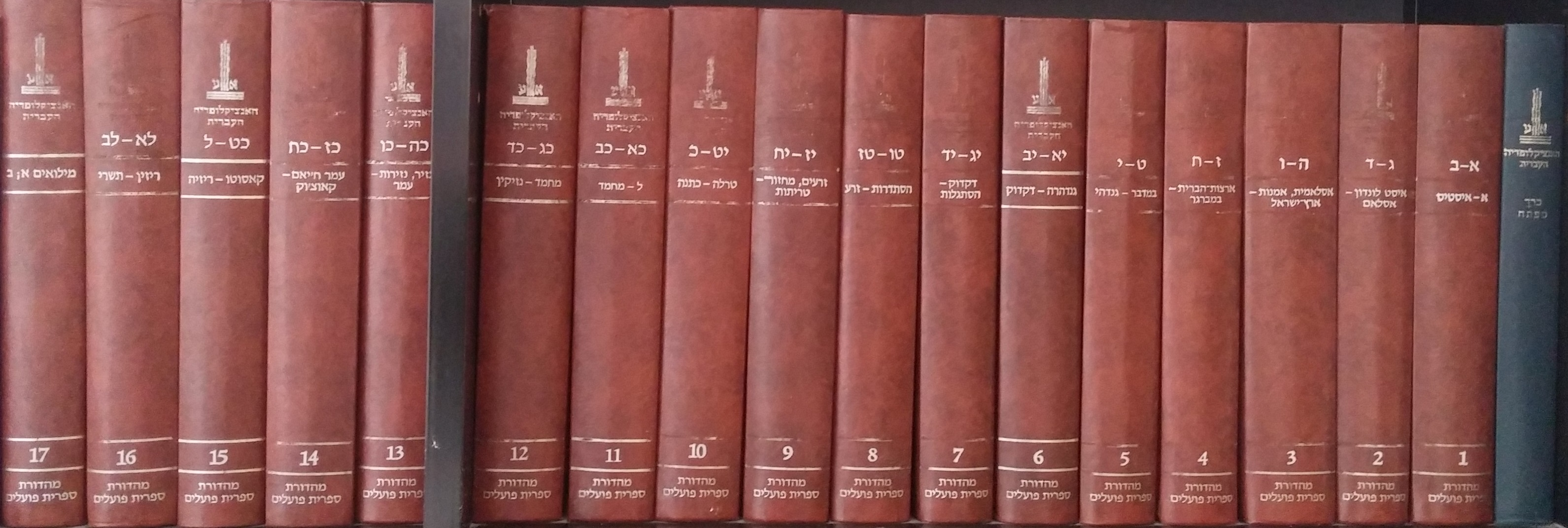
Volumes of the Encyclopaedia Hebraica more conventionally arranged

The Encyclopaedia Hebraica (Hebrew: האנציקלופדיה העברית) is a comprehensive encyclopedia in the Hebrew language that was published in the latter half of the 20th century.

== History ==
The General Encyclopedia had been successfully printed by Bracha Peli's printing business under the editorship of Prof. Joseph Klausner. Bracha Peli's son, Alexander was keen to start a more ambitious encyclopedia in Hebrew.

The idea of the Encyclopaedia Hebraica began to take material form in the summer of 1944. An advisory committee was established to determine the goals of the encyclopedia. Printing of the first volume began in the summer of 1948 with the founding of the State of Israel. The honorary president of the project was the President of Israel, Professor Chaim Weizmann.

The first volume covered the entries Aleph (א) through Australia (אוסטרליה). The first photograph that appears in the volume is a picture of Israel's Declaration of Independence. The entry concluding the encyclopedia, in volume 32, is Tishrei (תשרי).

In the publisher's introduction was written:

We have strong faith that we will realize our aspiration to provide exceptional content in a magnificent vessel and to add and enhance from volume to volume, and that we will finish publishing all 16 volumes within five or six years and that the whole project will achieve its purpose.

As it turned out, the writing of the encyclopedia continued for more than thirty years, and only in 1980—a quarter century after the original target date—was the publication completed. In total, the encyclopedia numbered thirty-two volumes when it was completed. During the writing stage, an additional Addendum I volume came out, which updated and supplemented volumes 1 through 16, and after volume 32 was completed an Addendum II volume was published. In 1985, five years after completion of the volumes of the encyclopedia, an index volume was printed, and in 1995 Addendum III came out, which updated data in Addendum II. With it also appeared two volumes containing extensive updates of entries dealing with the State of Israel and land of Israel.

The many years needed for completion of the encyclopedia meant that its editors were replaced over the years. The position was held by Joseph Klausner, Benzion Netanyahu, Yeshayahu Leibowitz, Nathan Rotenstreich, Yehoshua Gutman, and Joshua Prawer. The editorial supervisor throughout all the volumes was Alexander Peli. More than 2,500 writers participated in the writing of the encyclopedia, among them the leading Israeli scientists and fifteen Nobel laureates.

During the period of publication, a tremendous significance was associated with the encyclopedia. This was demonstrated by the fact there were people that felt a driving need to be included in the encyclopedia as a sort of stamp of approval of their importance and position. Bracha Peli, publisher of the encyclopedia, later told of an author who approached her one day and threatened to commit suicide if he was not included: "Even though his standing in the Hebrew literature was not of great importance, I did not take any chances and included him as an entry." At times, arguments arose over who would write a given article, arguments that stemmed from academic differences of opinion or from political or emotional factors. Such was the case with the articles on David Ben-Gurion and on Adolf Hitler.

The newer volumes of the encyclopedia that were written in the 1990s and edited by David Shacham were criticized for allegedly containing a post-Zionist tone.

Within a year of the last volume being published the rights to the encyclopedia had been sold. Schocken Publishing House are said to be working on a new, revised edition of the encyclopedia.

== Characteristics ==
The nature of the encyclopedia is reflected in its secondary title: "General, Jewish, and Israeli." The encyclopedia covers general topics, but a Jewish-Israeli emphasis is discernible, principally in articles dealing with Judaism, Jews, and Israel, as well as in its treatment of such topics within articles on general topics. Thus the encyclopedia takes care to emphasize in every biographical article the Jewishness of the person, even when Judaism is of no significance in the person's life (e.g. Boris Pasternak), as well as the person's impact on Jewish people. The longest biographical article (thirty-two columns) is on Theodor Herzl, and the longest non-Jewish biographical article is on Johann Wolfgang von Goethe.

Articles dealing with various countries and cities typically give an account of the place's general history, followed by a separate detailed account of its Jewish history where it has one; in particular, for places that were under Nazi rule a detailed account is given of the fate of its Jewish community during the Holocaust. Similarly, in describing countries and cities with an existing Jewish community, the encyclopedia invariably provided a detailed account of the number of Jews, their professions, their main places of habitation, the structure of the community, and similar details.

Writers of the encyclopedia did not hide their Jewish-nationalistic political views. Thus, the Kingdom of Jordan did not warrant an entry, since the encyclopedia did not recognize it. Details of this country are included within the article "Land of Israel," and it is stated in the beginning of the article that in the Hebrew language, the phrase includes the "land of Israel" on both sides of the Jordan River. In the second supplementary volume, the entry "Jordan" appears, reflecting the change of political attitudes in Israeli society in the passing decades.

The letter Aleph contains the largest number of articles, and six and a half volumes are accorded to it (more than 30% of the anticipated number of volumes). The last article is "Ethers" (אתרים). The longest article starting with aleph is "Land of Israel" (ארץ ישראל), to which an entire volume is dedicated: volume 6. Next in size is "United States of America" (ארצות הברית של אמריקה), which spans 126 columns. The collective size of the aleph articles does not stem from its relative weight in the Hebrew alphabet, but rather reflects the initial enthusiasm with which the editors tried to include the sum of human knowledge. When it became clear that at that rate and depth production of the encyclopedia would never come to an end, it was decided to limit its extent (which, among other things, led to the existence in the first volumes of "see also"'s that in the end pointed to unwritten articles). The smallest letter in the encyclopedia is the letter Tsade (צ), which spans 531 pages, less than one volume, and is contained in volume 28.

A famous non-political controversy involved the article on Plato (אפלטון) appearing in volume 5. Professor Yeshayahu Leibowitz, one of the encyclopedia's main editors, sharply disagreed with the interpretation given to Plato's ideas. This he expressed by adding in the forward pages of this volume, where he was listed as "Prof. Yeshayahu Leibowitz, editor in Philosophy", a footnote reading "until page 223" (the page where the Plato article appeared).
