= Hebrew Book Week =

Annual week-long event in Israel

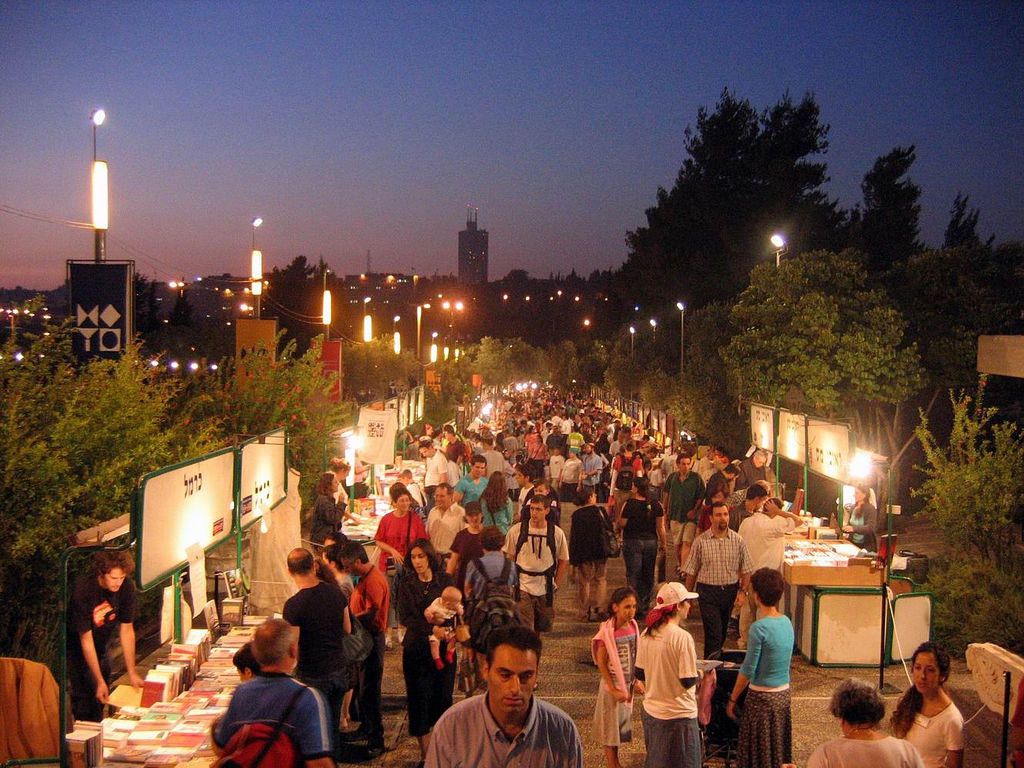
Hebrew Book Week 2005 Israel Museum, Jerusalem

Hebrew Book Week (Hebrew: שבוע הספר העברי) is an annual week-long event in Israel celebrating Hebrew literature.

== History ==
Hebrew Book Week evolved from a one-day event on Rothschild Boulevard in Tel Aviv organized by Bracha Peli, founder of Masada Press, to promote book sales in 1926.

During Hebrew Book Week, outdoor book fairs are held all over the country and publishing companies sell their books at a discount. Bookstores in Israel typically offer sales during this time which can last up to a month. In recent years, Hebrew Book Week has been extended to ten days.

Venues in Jerusalem have included the Israel Museum, Liberty Bell Park, Safra Square and the old Jerusalem Railway Station. The fair in Tel Aviv takes places at Rabin Square.

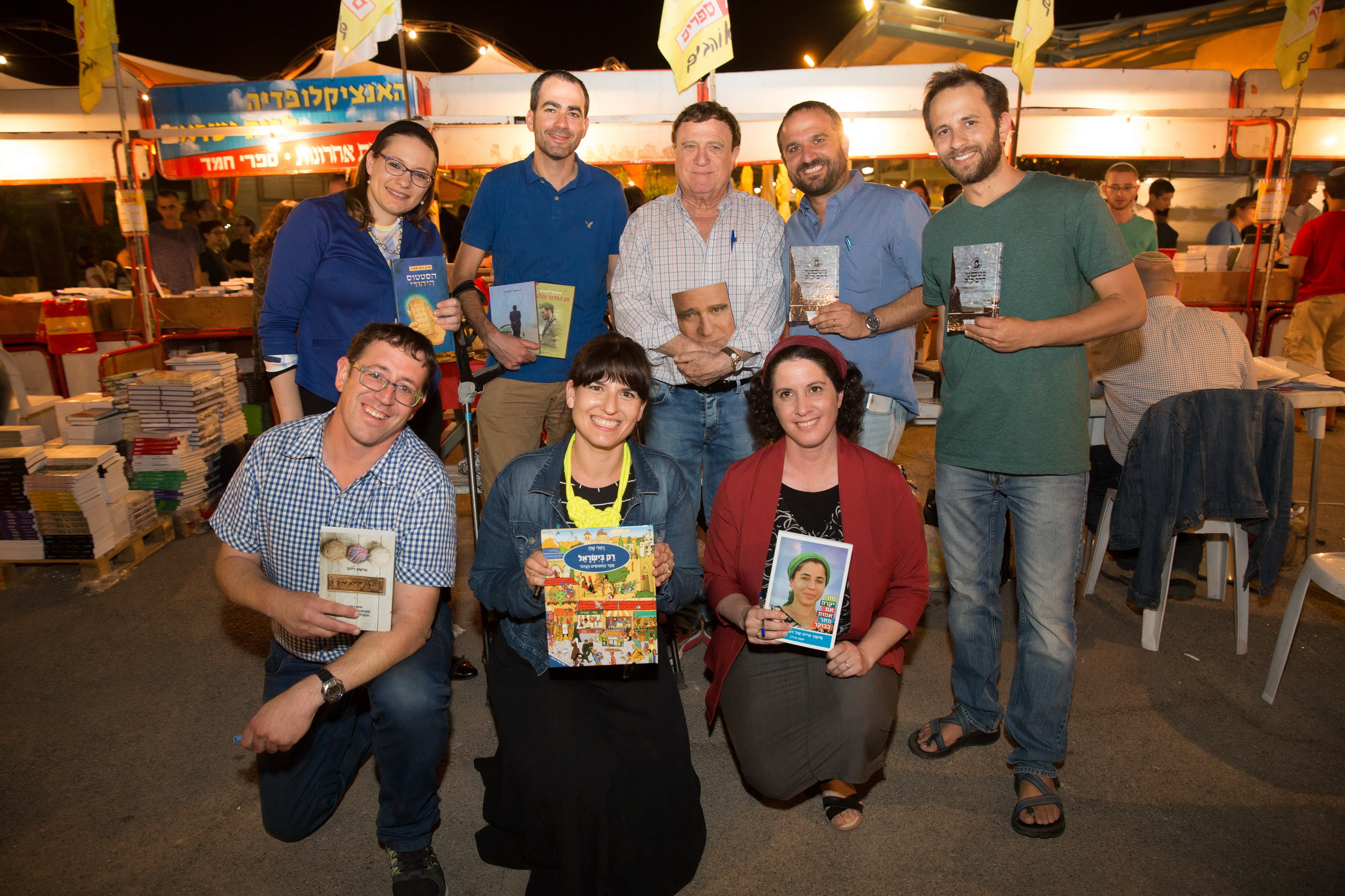
The Hebrew Book Week fair at the Jerusalem Station compound, 2017 Writers. Back line from left: Sivan Rahav-Meir, Dr. Asael Lubotzky, Yehoram Gaon

In addition to book sales, a variety of literary events are held during Book Week, such as get-togethers with authors and public readings. The award ceremony for the Bernstein Prize takes place during Hebrew Book Week. There is also a heightened level of attention paid to literature in the media.

== See also ==
- Culture of Israel
- Hebrew literature
