= Irit Linur =

Israeli author (born 1961)

- עירית לינור
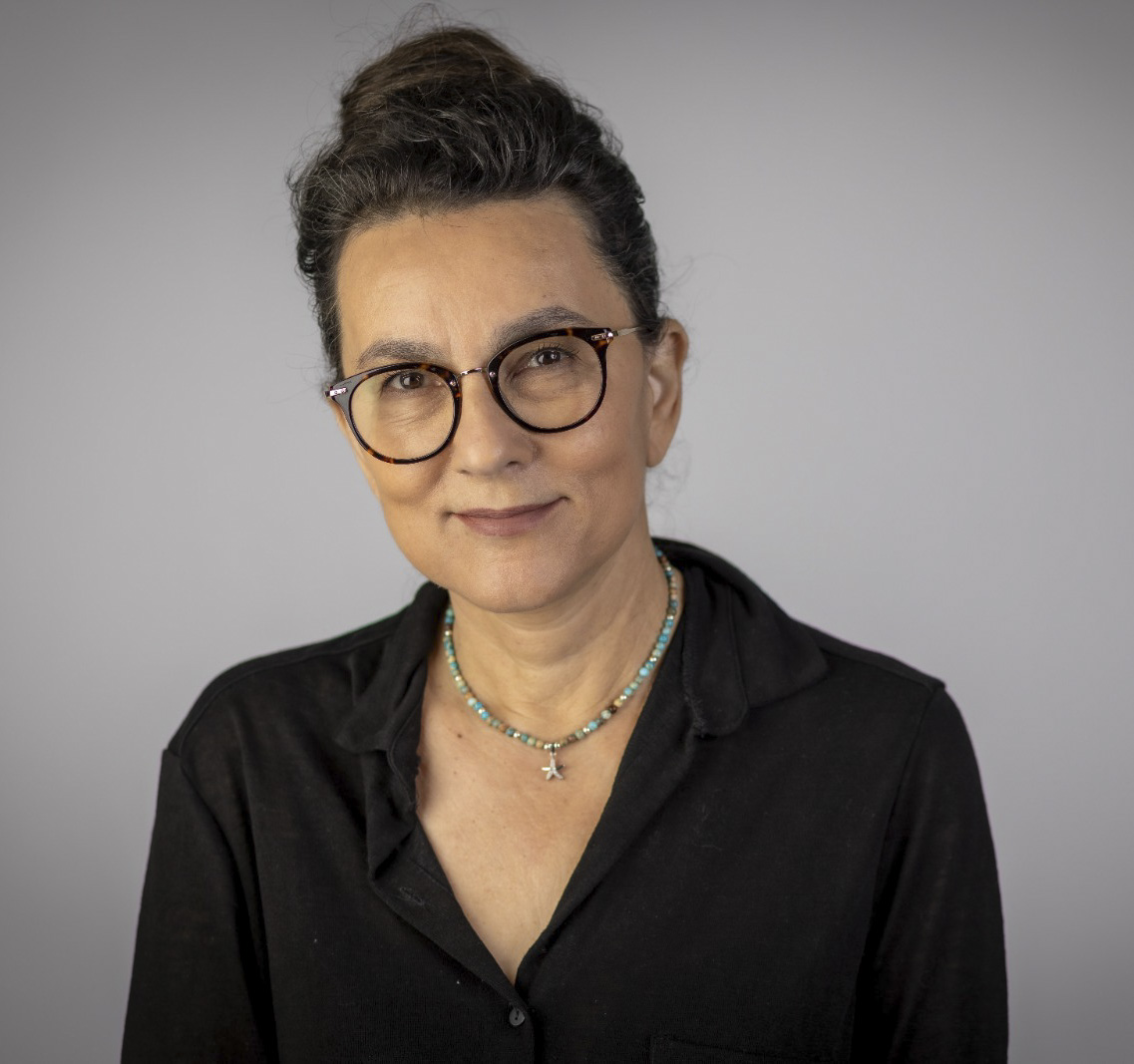
- Irit Linur, 2022
- Born: 1961 (age 64–65); Tel Aviv, Israel
- Education: Tel Aviv University
- Occupations: Novelist, Satirist, Radio Host
- Spouse: Alon Ben David
- Children: 1
- Writing career
- Language: Hebrew

Irit Linur (Hebrew: עירית לינור; born 1961) is an Israeli author.

== Biography ==
Irit Linur was married to Alon Ben David, Senior Defense Correspondent for Israel Channel 10 and Middle East Correspondent for Jane's Defence Weekly.

== Literary career ==
Linur started her writing career as a satirical columnist in local newspapers. Her first full-length novel was The Siren's Song, a best-selling romantic comedy set on the background of the Scud missile attacks on Tel Aviv during the Gulf War in 1991. In 1994, the book was adapted into a feature-length film directed by Eytan Fox. The title refers to the air-raid sirens which sounded almost every night during the six weeks of the war. It is the story of an assertive professional woman who experiences emotional growth and romance. At the same time, the book is critical of Tel Aviv's superficial lifestyle.

Linur's second novel, Two Snow Whites, is about a photographer who finds herself involved in a murder case. Sandler Ella, her third novel, depicts the glamorous life of media broadcasters. Her fourth novel, The Brown Girls, was adapted as a popular television mini-series. Linur has also published a book of humorous essays, The Secret Blonde.

Linur is a co-host on the radio show "The Final Word" on Galei Zahal, Israel's Military Radio. The show would initially pair a liberal and a conservative who'd discuss current events, with Linur playing the liberal part. However, in recent years she has expressed views hostile to liberal groups and left-wing politicians in Israel. In 2002, during the Second Intifada, Linur wrote an open letter announcing that she had canceled her subscription to the Israeli newspaper Haaretz, criticizing the "radical leftism" and "anti-Zionism" of the newspaper as well as what she referred to as a "pro-Palestinian bias" on the part of Haaretz journalists Gideon Levy and Amira Hass.

In December 2017, Linur was suspended for seven days from her position as a commentator on Army Radio, after she criticized then-President Reuven Rivlin over his support for anti-corruption protests, referring to Rivlin as an "insolent piece of work."

In April 2019, Linur apologized on the air after she and her co-host insinuated that a journalist's wife, a public attorney, was the source behind his news reports concerning PM Netanyahu's investigations.

In May 2019, referring to a protest that featured both Jewish and Muslim speakers, including Israeli Arab politician, MK Ayman Odeh, Linur commented on the air that the protest would have been better off, had Odeh been replaced by two gas station workers as the representatives of the Israeli Arab public.

In February 2022, speaking on the radio show "The Final Word," Linur referred to Reform Judaism as "an esoteric religious fringe movement that is unimportant, nonexistent, unpopular and unaccepted," comparing the Reform movement to Lev Tahor, an extremist Jewish sect. In response, a group of 150 Israel Defense Forces reserve officers, who were members of Reform congregations, sent a letter to then-Defense Minister Benny Gantz demanding Linur's dismissal if she refused to apologize.
