= Alexander Peli =

Israeli editor (1915–2007)

- אלכסנדר פלאי
- Born: Alexander Pilipovetsky; 1915; Kiev
- Died: 2007 (aged 91–92)
- Education: Hebrew University of Jerusalem
- Occupation: Encyclopedist
- Known for: Encyclopaedia Hebraica
- Spouses: Naomi Tabatchnik; Ruth
- Children: Edith and David
- Parent(s): Meir and Bracha Peli

Alexander Peli (Hebrew: אלכסנדר פלאי; 1915–2007) was a Ukrainian-born Israeli encyclopedist, the supervising editor of the Encyclopaedia Hebraica. The project began using his mother's publishing house in 1946 with Peli supervising. The last volume was published in 1996.

== Biography ==
Alexander Pilipovetsky was born in Kiev to Meir and Bracha Pilipovetsky (born Kutzenok). The parents had married the year before against the Kutzenok family's wishes. The Pilipovetskys moved to Palestine when he was six years old and he went to high school in Tel Aviv. In July 1921 his family were early settlers in the new city of Tel Aviv in Palestine (the land that was to become the State of Israel). He attended the University of Jerusalem graduating in History and Philosophy. He had been brought up with encyclopedias. His mother published the eight-volume General Encyclopedia. Peli's dream was to create a new encyclopedia in Hebrew.

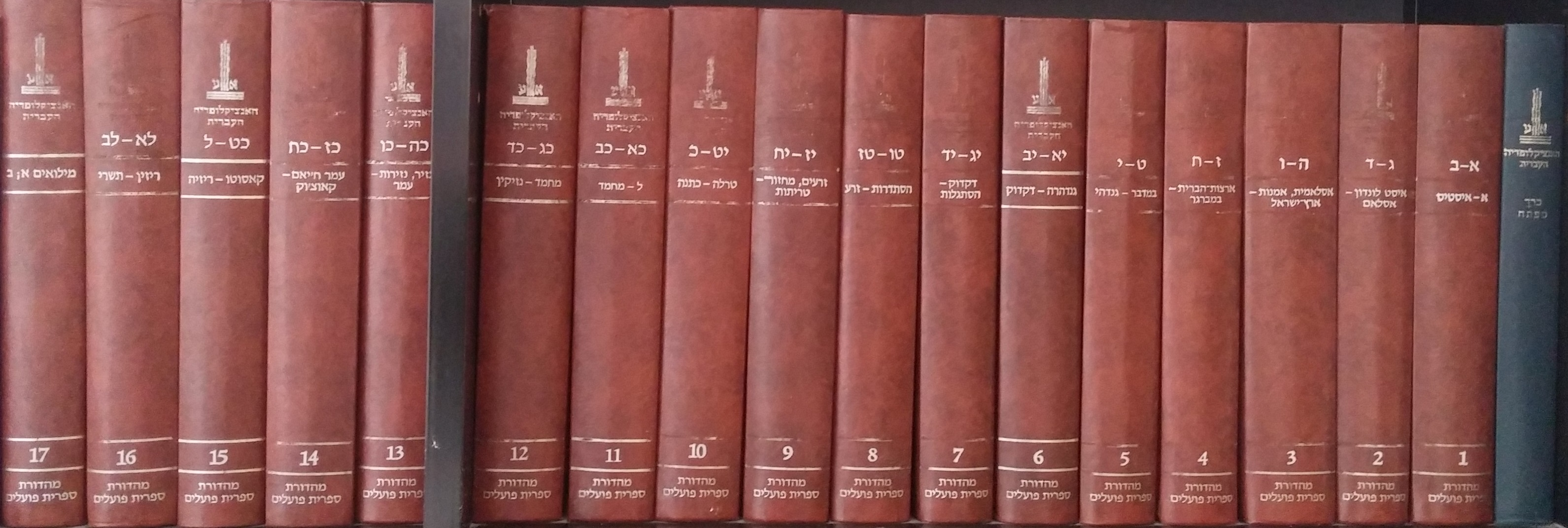
Encyclopaedia Hebraica

== Literary career ==
In 1944 a committee was formed to work out the aims and objectives of a project to create an encyclopedia in Hebrew. In 1948 work was started, and Chaim Weizmann was the first president of the project. He was also to be the first president of the new state of Israel. Peli was appointed supervising editor and the first editor was Prof. Joseph Klausner The plans were drawn up and the first volume covered from Aleph to Australia.

The introduction to the first volume boldly announced that it was planned to complete the encyclopedia project in "five to six years". The breadth and depth of the project was large. One entry for Israel took up a complete volume. When Peli's first editor died, he appointed Benzion Netanyahu in 1948. Netanyaho had been recommended by Klausner, before his death. The encyclopedia continued to be firmly an Israeli publication. Netanyahu, who was to remain editor until 1962, was the father future Israeli prime minister, Benjamin Netanyahu.

The third editor that Peli appointed was possibly the most controversial. Professor Yeshayahu Leibowitz caused some delays with his arguments about content, although Leibowitz was difficult outside as well as within the project team.

It was not until 1980 that another editor, Professor Joshua Prawer, managed to declare the encyclopedia as complete. Even after that date it took five years to publish an index, and there was always a need for amendments.

In 1986, Peli's mother, who owned Massada Publishing house, died. She left half the business to Alexander and half to his sister's family. The businesses did not prosper, and the rights to the encyclopedia were sold to Schocken in 1997. Peli was retained as a consultant.
