= Shishi (TV program) =

- Original title: שישי
- Presented by: Raviv Drucker (2006–2009); Ofer Shelah (2006–2009); Tali Moreno (2013–2015); Alon Ben David (2013–2015); Ayala Hasson (2015–present)

Production
- Running time: 90 minutes

Original release
- Network: Channel 10 (2006–2019); Reshet 13 (2019–present)
- Release: 5 May 2006 – present

Shishi (Hebrew: שישי, meaning "Friday") is an Israeli news and current affairs program, broadcast every Friday evening on Channel 10. From 2006 to 2009 the program was hosted by Raviv Drucker and Ofer Shelah. It was hosted by Alon Ben David and Tali Moreno beginning in 2013.
