= Roni Bar-On =

Israeli politician and lawyer (born 1948)

- רוני בר-און
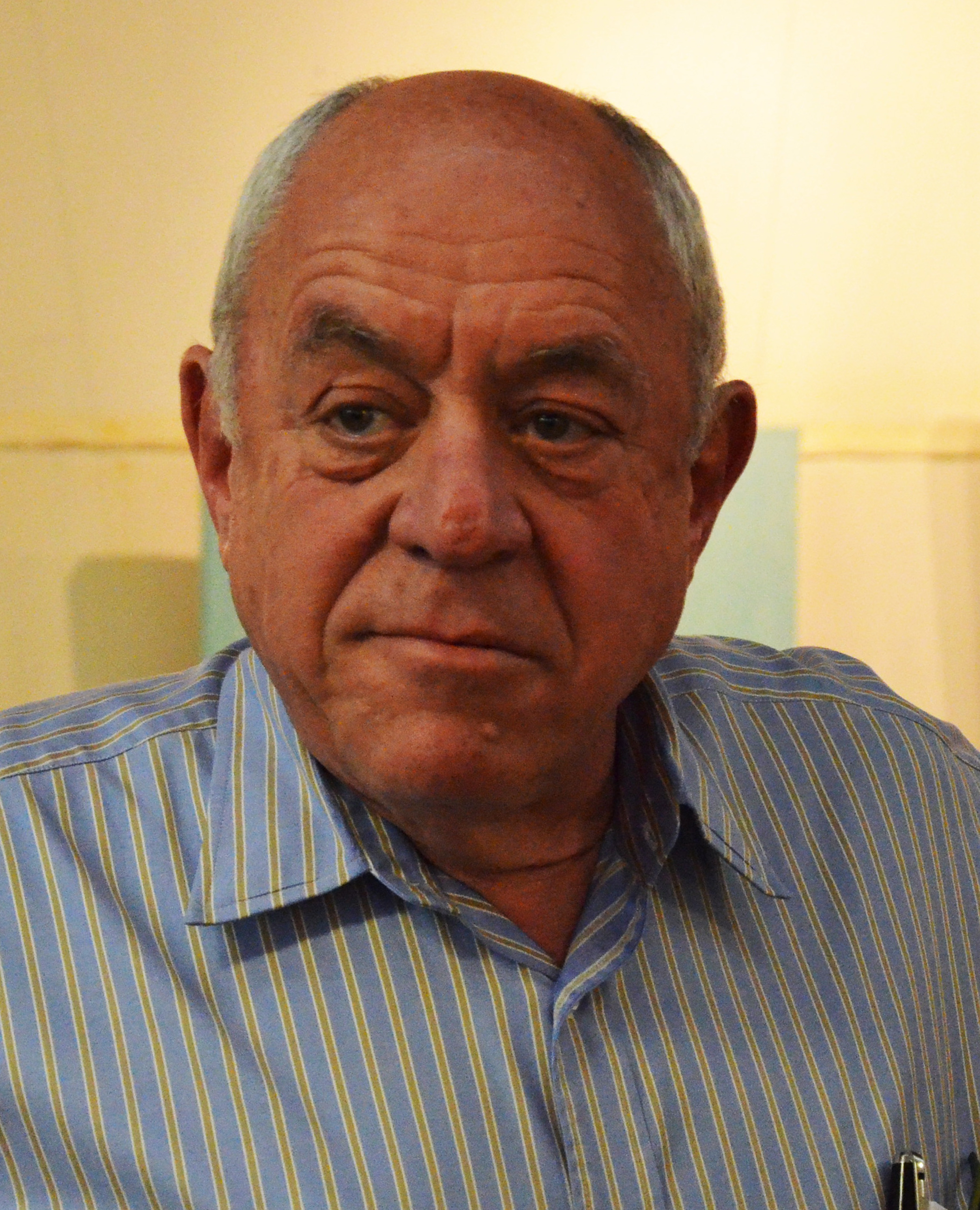

Ministerial roles
- 2006: Minister of Science & Technology
- 2006: Minister of National Infrastructure
- 2006–2007: Minister of Internal Affairs
- 2007–2009: Minister of Finance

Faction represented in the Knesset
- 2003–2005: Likud
- 2005–2013: Kadima

Other roles
- 1997: Attorney General

Personal details
- Born: 2 June 1948 (age 78) Tel Aviv, Israel

Roni Bar-On (Hebrew: רוני בר-און; born 2 June 1948) is an Israeli politician and lawyer. He served as a member of the Knesset for Likud and Kadima between 2003 and 2011, and is also a former Minister of Finance.

== Biography ==
Bar-On was born in Tel Aviv shortly after Israeli independence in 1948. After his national service, in which he rose to the rank of Lieutenant-Colonel, he studied law at the Hebrew University of Jerusalem. Whilst working as a lawyer he became a Justice in the Military Court of Appeals in the West Bank.

In 1997 he was appointed Attorney General, but resigned as a consequence of heavy criticism related to the 'Bar-On–Hebron' scandal, which involved allegations against chief officials that they recommended Bar-On to the position for personal reasons. Bar-On resigned within 48 hours.

Prior to his political career, Bar-On served, among others, as Chairman of the Council for the Organisation of Sport Gambling (1998–2001), member of the Central Committee of the Israel Bar (1995–2003) and the Jerusalem Regional Committee of the Israeli Bar, as well as a member of the Council for the Administrative Courts, the Advisory Commission to the Government Companies Authority and the Public Defenders Commission. In addition, he served as Chairman of Beitar Jerusalem's committee, and also on the committee of the Israel Football Association.

Bar-On entered the political world when he was elected to the Knesset in 2003 on the Likud list. He served as chairman of the House Committee, and a member of the Constitution, Law and Justice and State Control Committees, as well as a substitute member of the Foreign Affairs and Defense Committee. He was also a member of the parliamentary inquiry committee on violence in sports, as well as the Environmental Lobby. He also served as member of the Parliamentary Inquiry Committee for Uncovering Corruption in the Government System of Israel.

When Ariel Sharon broke with his party to form Kadima, Bar-On followed him, and was appointed Minister of National Infrastructure and Minister of Science and Technology for the last three months of the Knesset term.

After the 2006 elections, Ehud Olmert appointed him Minister of Internal Affairs. He was also considered for the post of Justice Minister after Haim Ramon's conviction for sexual harassment, but withdrew his candidacy on 4 February 2007. As part of a cabinet reshuffle in July 2007 he was appointed Finance Minister, despite having no economic experience and lead the Israeli economy through the turbulent times of the Global Economic Crisis.

In the 2009 elections he retained his seat after winning fifth place on Kadima's list, but lost his place in the cabinet as the Likud-led coalition formed the government. As a leading member of the minority in the Knesset, Bar-On was elected to head the Knesset State Control Committee in July 2011. As a part of a coalition reshuffle, Bar-On was then elected for the position of Head of Foreign Affairs and Defense Committee. On 5 December 2012, in the days leading up to the 2013 elections, Bar-On announced he would not be contesting the elections.

He is married with three children.
