= Alon Ben David =

Israeli television and print journalist

- אלון בן דוד
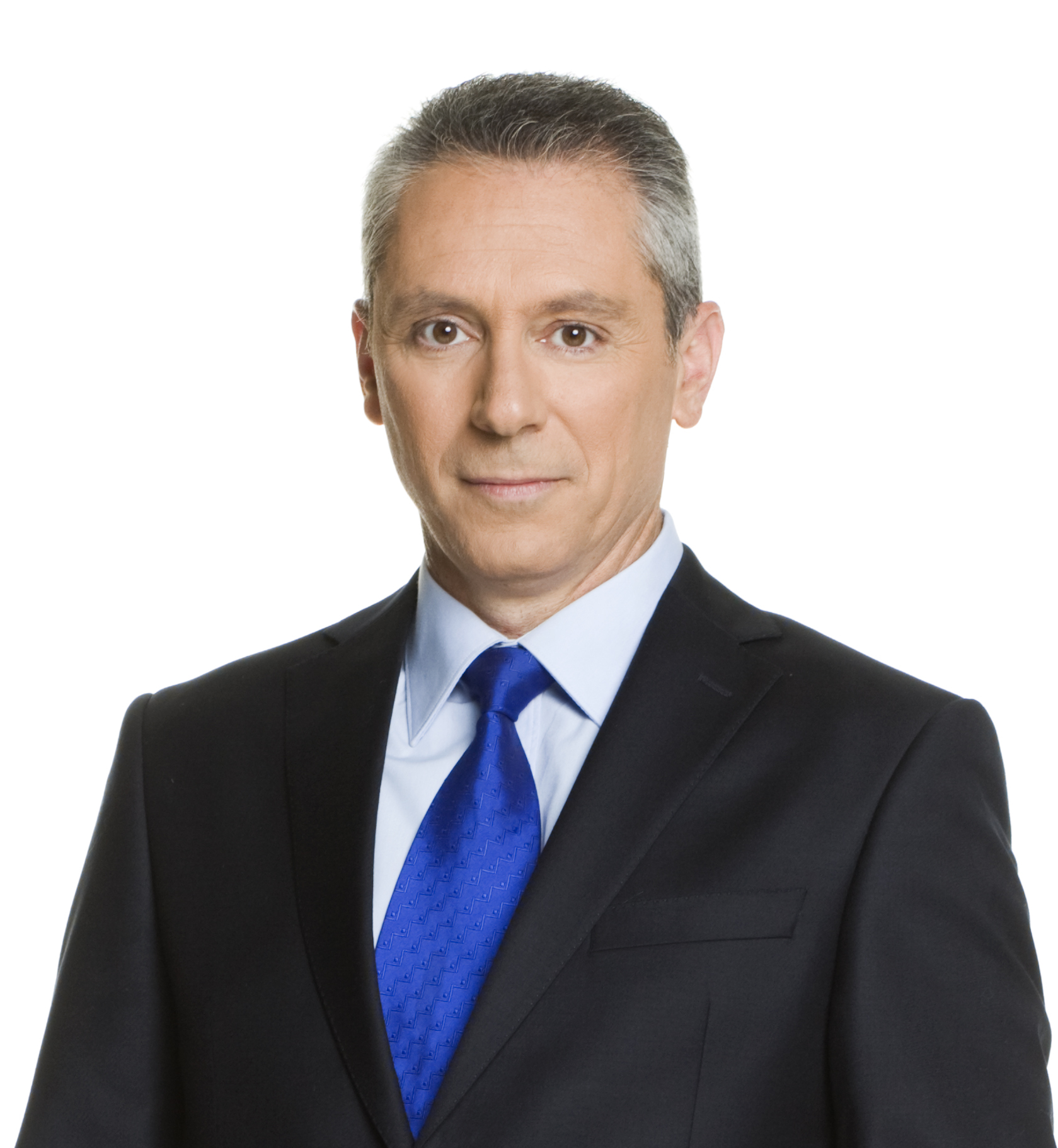
- Born: November 9, 1967 (age 58)
- Education: Tel Aviv University (B.A.); Harvard University (M.A.)

Alon Ben-David (Hebrew: אלון בן דוד; born November 9, 1967) is an Israeli television and print journalist, specializing in defense and military issues. He is currently senior defense correspondent for Israel's Channel 13 and used to anchor the network's Friday magazine.

== Biography ==
Alon Ben David holds a BA in Political Science from Tel Aviv University and a Master's in Public Administration from Harvard University. He was married to Israeli writer Irit Linur.

== Journalism career ==
Alon Ben-David began his journalistic career as a military reporter at IDF Radio - Galey Tzahal - where he covered the First Intifada. After his discharge in 1988, he worked at Israel's national radio - Kol Israel - as a police affairs correspondent. In 1989 he joined Israel's Channel 1 Israel Broadcasting Authority (IBA) as a reporter in southern Israel and later as police affairs correspondent. In 1993 he was appointed military correspondent for Israel's Channel 1.

Ben-David covered the Lebanon War, where he frequently joined IDF operations. He also covered Israel's 2000 withdrawal from Lebanon and the Second Intifada, which erupted soon after. In 2006, he covered the Second Lebanon War.

In 2001, during a year of studies in the US, Ben-David reported from NY during the 9/11 attacks. In 2003 he joined Israel 10 as senior defense correspondent.

In 2003 he joined the London-based Jane's Defence Weekly as Middle East correspondent, and later became a contributor for Aviation Week and Maariv. He also used to anchor the defense magazine at i24News international TV network.

In 2019 he released the docu-action series "Israel's Hitlist" (Reshimat Hisul), depicting and revealing Israel's secret assassination operations. In 2022 he created and released the docu-series "War at your doorstep" https://13tv.co.il/news/war-for-home/, describing Israel's "Defensive Shield" campaign that suppressed Palestinian suicide terrorism in 2002.

He serves as a senior fellow at the center for international communications at Bar-Ilan University and frequently lectures throughout the world on topics relating to the Middle East.
