= Bracha Peli =

Israeli publisher (1892–1986)

- ברכה פלאי
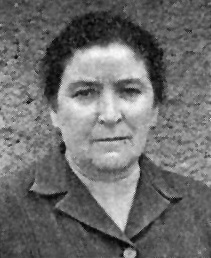
- Peli, 1940s
- Born: Bronya Kutzenok; 1892; Kiev
- Died: 1986; Israel
- Occupation: Publisher
- Known for: Hebrew Book Week
- Spouse: Meir Pilipovetsky (Peli)
- Children: Alexander Peli and daughter

Bracha Peli (Hebrew: ברכה פלאי; 1892–1986) was the founder and owner of the Israeli publishing house, Massada. She was the driving force behind the publication of Encyclopaedia Hebraica, and is credited with starting Israel's annual Hebrew Book Week.

== Biography ==
Bronya Kutzenok (later Bracha Peli) was born in Starovitzky, a small village in Russia, now Ukraine to a family of Hasidic Jews. She was the eldest of seven children. Her father, Shmuel Kutzenok, was a wealthy lumber merchant who supplied timber for artillery wagons to the Russian army. Her mother, Sarah, ran the village general store. She acquired an education by overhearing her brothers' lessons. Early on, she became proficient in Yiddish, Russian and Hebrew. In 1905, when she was about to study at a Gymnasium in Kiev, pogroms against the Jews erupted, disrupting her plans. She waited two years to complete her secondary education and study economics.

In 1914, after her mother died of tuberculosis, Peli met a young Zionist teacher, Meir Pilipovetsky, whom she married against her family's wishes. After her son, Alexander, was born she opened a Jewish secondary school that attracted 400 students in its first year.

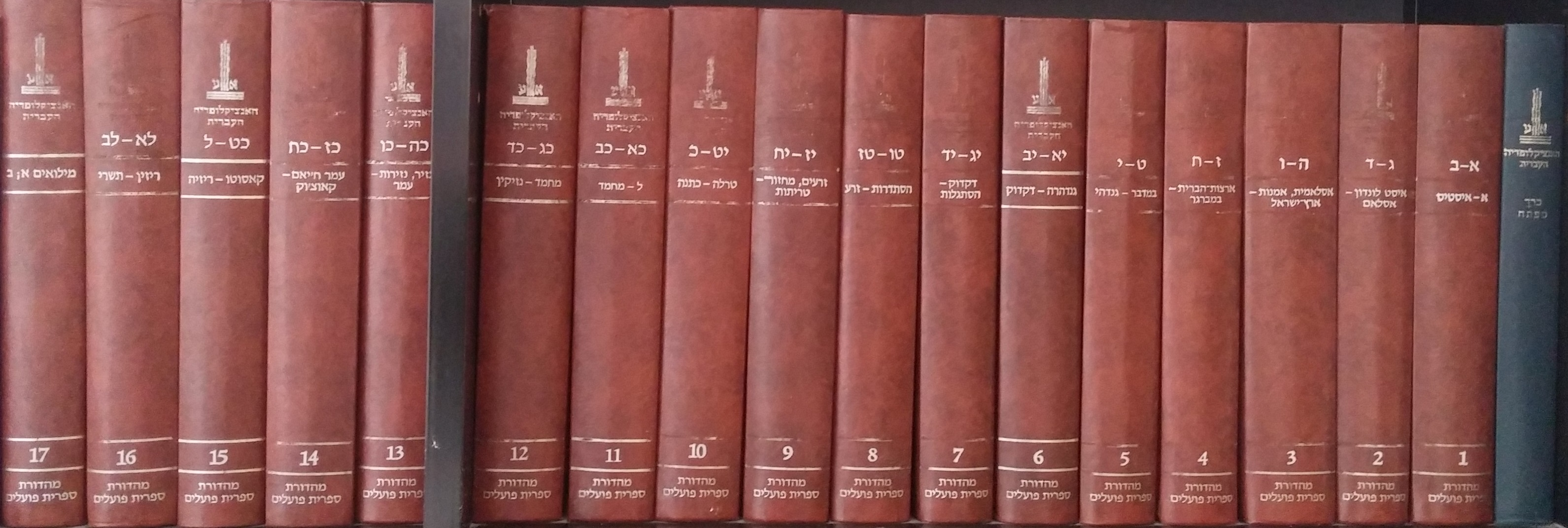
Encyclopedia Hebraica

In July 1921, Peli and her husband left Russia for Palestine, settling in Tel Aviv. In 1926, Peli opened a stall in Tel Aviv to sell books cheaply, which led to the inauguration of an annual event.

In 1930, she started publishing the books "Masada" in her home. In 1932, she officially founded the publishing house on Herzl Street in Tel Aviv and founded the Palai Press, where the publishing house's books were printed. The first project produced by the publishing house was "The General Encyclopedia" edited by Prof. Yosef Klausner. Other multi-volume projects were the Bible with S.L. Gordon's commentary, a history of music in Europe, the encyclopedia of psychology, "Encyclopedia Mesada" in five volumes, an encyclopedia of culture, an encyclopedia of culture and the world of culture originally translated from Italian (Fabri Publishing) and an encyclopedia for youth "Aviv".

Today Hebrew Book Week is a national 10-day event. The Encyclopaedia Hebraica project began using Bracha Peli's publishing house in 1946 with her son, Alexander, supervising. The last volume was published in 1996.

Bracha Peli died in 1986.

== See also ==
- Hebrew literature
