= Joshua Prawer =

Israeli medievalist and educator

- יהושע פרַאוֶור
- Born: November 10, 1917; Będzin, Kingdom of Poland
- Died: April 30, 1990 (aged 72); Jerusalem, Israel
- Occupations: Medievalist, Educator
- Writing career
- Subject: Crusader states

Joshua Prawer (Hebrew: יהושע פרַאוֶור; November 22, 1917 – April 30, 1990) was a notable Israeli historian and a scholar of the Crusades and Kingdom of Jerusalem.

His work often attempted to portray Crusader society as a forerunner to later European colonialist expansion. He was also an important figure in Israeli higher education, was one of the founders of the University of Haifa and Ben-Gurion University, and was a major reformer of the Israeli education system.

== Life ==
Prawer was born on November 10, 1917, to a prosperous Jewish merchant family in Będzin, a small city in the Polish part of Silesia. He grew up speaking Polish and German, learned Hebrew, French, and Latin at school, and after joining a Zionist group, learned Yiddish as well. He immigrated to Palestine in 1936, where he learned English, and became a student of mathematics at the Hebrew University of Jerusalem. An invitation to study at the university was one of the few legal ways for Jews to enter the British Mandate of Palestine at the time. His mother died at the outbreak of World War II, and most of his family was murdered in the Holocaust.

Prawer found that he was unhappy with mathematics, and his father suggested he study history instead since he had always enjoyed history in high school. His professor, Richard Koebner, an Anglophile historian of imperialism, set him on the course of studying the crusader colonies in the Holy Land. The close ties to Koebner were likely to have instilled in Prawer his interest in the history of settlements and colonialization. Prawer began his teaching career at the Hebrew University in 1947 and (after fighting in the 1948 siege of Jerusalem) soon rose through the faculty ranks. He became deputy dean of the Faculty of Humanities from 1953 to 1955, was made professor and chair of medieval history in 1958, was dean of the Faculty of Humanities from 1962 to 1966, and served as prorector at the university in the years 1975–78. In the process, he succeeded in making the university into a "global center" for Crusade Studies, and trained many future Israeli historians in that specialty. Prawer has been described as an outstanding teacher and lecturer who combined thorough preparation with a charismatic style. He was often invited to lecture abroad.

=== Other roles ===
In addition to his work at the Hebrew University, Joshua Prawer was involved in the creation of other Israeli institutions of higher learning, namely Ben-Gurion University of the Negev and especially the University of Haifa, where he was the first dean and academic chairman in the years 1966–8.

Prawer was a key contributor to Israeli government policy as well. Between 1957 and 1959, at the request of David Ben-Gurion, he chaired the Pedagogic Secretariat of the Education Ministry which was responsible for setting up new norms for Israeli secondary education. He fought against graded fees and for wider free compulsory education, and gave high priority to social integration and the rights of Sephardi students. During that time and as advisor to education minister Zalman Aranne afterwards, he helped draft the principles for teaching "Jewish awareness" that were incorporated into the primary and secondary school curricula. In 1963–65, he chaired a committee of experts bearing his name that recommended a radical reform of the entire Israeli education system. Its suggestions included making preschool enrollment universal for disadvantaged children, shortening elementary school to grades 1–6; admitting all pupils without tests into integrated junior high schools (grades 7–9), raising the age of free compulsory education to fifteen (later raised to eighteen), establishing two-year and three-year comprehensive schools that provided a choice of tracks towards either a vocational diploma or a matriculation certificate, further integrating students of different skills and social classes, and establishing a new curriculum division in the Ministry of Education and Culture. The plan was approved by the Knesset and government, which allocated substantial resources to it, and the program began to be implemented in the summer of 1968.

Together with Professor H. Hanani, Prawer initiated the mechina university preparatory programs in 1963, which were originally intended to provide an additional year of study for Sephardic students after discharge from the defense forces, but were later expanded to include foreign educated students and immigrants.

Prawer served as chief editor of the Encyclopaedia Hebraica from 1967 onwards, with volume 21 the first to be published under his tenure. He advised and helped shape the Tower of David Museum of the History of Jerusalem, and was asked to advise the government on cultural agreements with other countries.

=== Honors and later life ===
- In 1967, Prawer served as chairman of the Humanities Section of the Israel Academy of Sciences and Humanities, and was elected as Corresponding Fellow of the Medieval Academy of America.
- In 1969, he received the Israel Prize in the humanities.
- In 1969, he also received an honorary doctorate from the University of Montpellier.
- In 1974, Prawer was honored as Visiting Fellow of All Souls College, Oxford,
- In 1974, he was also awarded the Rothschild Prize and the Order of the Chevalier de L'Ordre Nationale du Mérite.
- In 1982, he was presented with a festschrift containing papers by twenty-two historians during a special conference in Jerusalem.
- In 1987, Prawer and his colleagues hosted the Second International Conference of the Society for the Study of the Crusades and the Latin East.
- In 1989, he was honored as a Yakir Yerushalayim (Distinguished Citizen of Jerusalem).

In an interview a year before his death, Joshua Prawer said his message for the Jerusalem of today is "that it is a universal city, belonging to all cultures and conquering time." Prawer died in Jerusalem on April 30, 1990.

== Research ==
Prawer was part of a cadre of historians, including Claude Cahen and Jean Richard, who freed crusader studies from the old conception of crusader society as an exemplar of pure, unchanging feudalism that spontaneously emerged from the conquest. This view, which originated with feudal jurists in the thirteenth century, was held to by modern historians since the early thirties. Through the work of Prawer, particularly his two papers from the fifties, and his colleagues, crusader society began to be seen as dynamic, with the nobility gradually putting checks on the monarchy. The combined efforts of these historians led to a surge of new research into crusader society. Prawer's research extended to a wide variety of other aspects of the crusader states. Among the topics he addressed were land development projects and urban settlement, agriculture, the Italian quarters of port cities, the types of landed property, and legal issues in the Assises des Bourgeois.

One of Prawer's best known works is the Histoire du Royaume Latin de Jérusalem, which won him the Prix Gustave Schlumberger of the Académie des Inscriptions et Belles-Lettres. The two-volume work presents the crusader states as a working immigrant society, and shows the importance of immigration and labor shortages. Another book by Prawer, The Latin Kingdom of Jerusalem: European Colonialism in the Middle Ages, which was intended for a larger audience, was more controversial. In it, he portrays the crusaders as a society of Frankish immigrants living in complete political and social segregation from the local Muslim and Syro-Christian population, and terms this phenomenon "Apartheid". To Prawer, it is the settlers' refusal to assimilate and their reconstruction of a European-type society on foreign soil, as well as the persistence of indigenous institutions without any interference, that mark the Crusader settlement as colonialist. His thesis is that the economy, society, and institutions of the Latin states are best understood in the light of their colonial status. The 1980 book Crusader Institutions collected a number of his earlier publications and expanded upon them with revisions and new chapters. The book continues his treatment of the Kingdom of Jerusalem as a European colonial product but focuses attention on five topical areas, while throughout employing the tools of textual criticism and commentary on sources. Especially prominent is his coverage of the status and administrative role of burgesses, which had not received such attention before. In his last years, he published a book on a topic of especial interest to him, The History of the Jews in the Latin Kingdom of Jerusalem, which examined the tightly knit isolated Jewish communities of the Levant, the Jewish philosophical feuds they engaged in, and their dreams of restoring Israel.

== Comparison of Zionism to the Crusades ==
An analogy has frequently been drawn between the European Crusades of the Middle Ages and the modern day Zionist movement. This view, which has been espoused by Arab media and political leaders, has also been discussed in Israeli academia. Prawer was often asked to comment on this analogy, and claimed that a major difference was that the Jews settled the land and worked it, whereas the Crusaders lorded over a conquered land worked by the natives. Ronnie Ellenblum, a lecturer at Hebrew University, identifies a subliminal objective in Prawer's work to draw a distinction between the two: "He's always writing about the Crusaders' manpower shortage and about their not settling the land...He claims that their presence here was principally urban, consisting of nobility and merchants. This is why they lost in the end. The implications are obvious: If we bring enough immigrants, and if we settle the land, we are bound to succeed." (Ellenblum himself has shown that Crusader settlement in the Holy Land was much more widespread than previously thought and has found evidence of hundreds of Crusader farms.) But he also notes that "if Joshua Prawer were alive today he would no doubt deny any linkage between his Zionist political beliefs and the model of segregation that he developed."

Ziad J. Asali, who considers Zionism "the heir—albeit illegitimate—of the Crusader movement," goes further and writes that Prawer "recognized the extent of the similarity in the individual and social experience of Crusaders and Zionists. Rather than studying the comparison and denying its validity, he chose to study the Crusader's experience as if it were a historical model which could be completely analyzed and dissected in order to benefit from its experience and avoid its mistakes." To Zionist author Yoram Hazony, however, it is exactly because of Prawer's readiness to draw the analogy that he considers him a subverter of Zionism and a progenitor of post-Zionist thought. David Ohana, a professor of history at Ben Gurion University who rejects the Zionist-Crusader analogy, writes that the subject has now become a litmus test for clarifying one's views on Zionism, with post-Zionists freely making the analogy and sympathizers with the Zionist viewpoint rejecting it.

== Selected publications ==
- (1969–70). Histoire du royaume Latin de Jérusalem. Le Monde byzantin. Paris: Éditions du Centre National de la Recherche Scientifique.
- (1972). The Latin kingdom of Jerusalem: European Colonialism in the Middle Ages. London: Weidenfeld and Nicolson (later editions The Crusader's Kingdom: European Colonialism in the Middle Ages).
- (1972). The world of the Crusaders. London: Weidenfeld and Nicolson.
- (1980). Crusader institutions. Oxford: Clarendon Press.
- (1988). The History of the Jews in the Latin Kingdom of Jerusalem. Oxford: Clarendon Press.

== See also ==
- First Crusade
- History of Jerusalem
- History of the Jews and the Crusades
- History of the Jews and Judaism in the Land of Israel
- List of Israel Prize recipients
