= Rafik Haj Yahia =

Israeli-Arab politician (1949–2000)

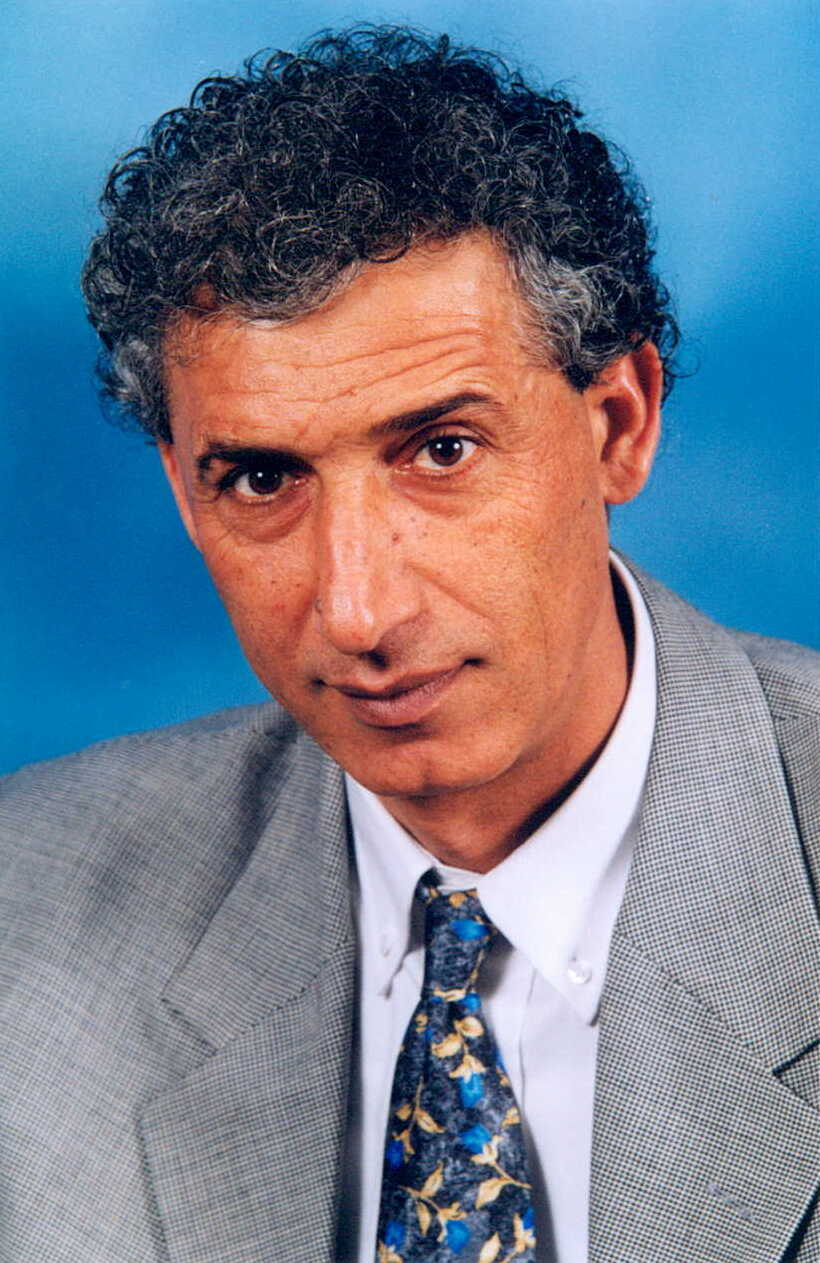
- Haj Yahia in the late 1990s

Faction represented in the Knesset
- 1998–1999: Labor Party
- 1999: One Nation

Personal details
- Born: 3 September 1949 Tayibe, Israel
- Died: 16 April 2000 (aged 50)

Rafik Haj Yahia (Arabic: رفيق حاج يحيى, Hebrew: רפיק חאג'-יחיא; 3 September 1949 – 16 April 2000) was an Israeli Arab politician who served as a member of the Knesset for the Labor Party and One Nation between March 1998 and June 1999.

== Biography ==
Born in Tayibe, Haj Yahia gained a BA in Hebrew language and education from Bar-Ilan University, before training to be a teacher at a Haifa seminary. From 1971 until 1980 he worked as a teacher in an agricultural high school in his hometown. In 1981 he began working as a television reporter, a job he held until 1988. He became a member of Tayibe's local council and became the town's first mayor in 1989. He also served as deputy head of the National Committee of Arab Local Authorities and of the Union of Local Authorities in Israel.

Prior to the 1996 Knesset elections he was placed 37th on the Labor Party list. Although the party won only 34 seats, he entered the Knesset on 28 March 1998 as a replacement for Moshe Shahal. Upon taking his seat, he resigned his position as mayor of Tayibe. On 25 March 1999 Yahia, Amir Peretz and Adisu Massala broke away from the Labor Party to form One Nation. He lost his seat in the 1999 elections and died the following year at the age of 50.
