= David Tal (politician) =

Israeli politician

- דוד טל
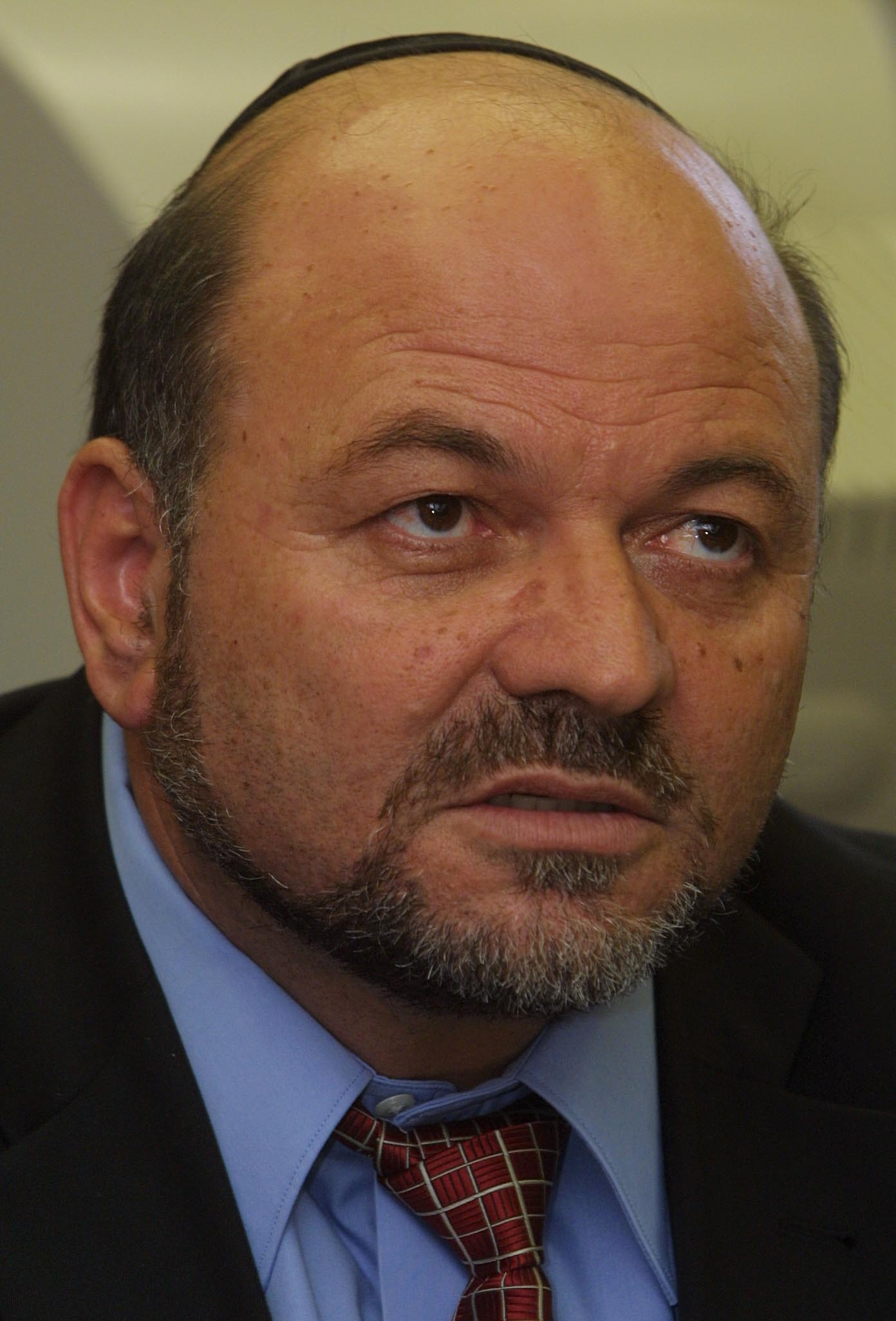

Faction represented in the Knesset
- 1996–2002: Shas
- 2003–2005: One Israel
- 2005: Noy
- 2005–2009: Kadima

Personal details
- Born: 26 January 1950 (age 76) Rehovot, Israel

David Tal (Hebrew: דוד טל; born 26 January 1950) is an Israeli politician and a former member of the Knesset. He was a member of the Kadima faction.

== Biography ==
Born in Rehovot, Tal studied at an ORT high school in that city. He served as a First Sergeant during his national service in the IDF and afterwards worked as a mechanic. He speaks English, Arabic and Tunisian. He lives in Rishon LeZion with his wife. He has six children.

== Political career ==
He joined the Sephardi Haredi party Shas, and began his political career as a member of the Rishon LeZion municipal council. In 1996 he was elected to the Knesset on the Shas list and became a Deputy Speaker of the Knesset. He retained his seat in the 1999 elections and was reappointed Deputy Speaker, also becoming chairman of the Labour, Welfare, and Health Committee and the Joint Committee for Automobile Insurance Arrangements.

He resigned from the Knesset in November 2002 and joined Amir Peretz's new One Nation party, where he was third on the list. He returned to the Knesset with One Nation following the January 2003 elections. When Peretz agreed to merge One Nation into the Labour Party, Tal broke away, and founded his own, one-man faction, Noy, on 23 May 2005.

On 23 November 2005, 14 MKs split off from the Likud faction and formed the Achrayut Leumit (National Responsibility) faction. Tal dissolved Noy to join this faction, which renamed itself Kadima on 17 January 2006. In the run-up to the 2006 elections Tal was placed 23rd on Kadima's list. With the party winning 29 seats, he returned to the Knesset for a fourth term, and was reappointed Deputy Speaker. He also chaired the House Committee, the Joint Committee for Discussion on the Law and Governance Order Bill, the Subcommittee for the Shmita Year, the Subcommittee for Examining the Security Measures for Knesset Members, and the Lobby for Closing the Social Gaps. He lost his seat in the 2009 elections.
