= 2019 Israeli Labor Party leadership election =

Israeli Labor Party leadership election

- 7 June – 2 July 2019

vote by general membership of party
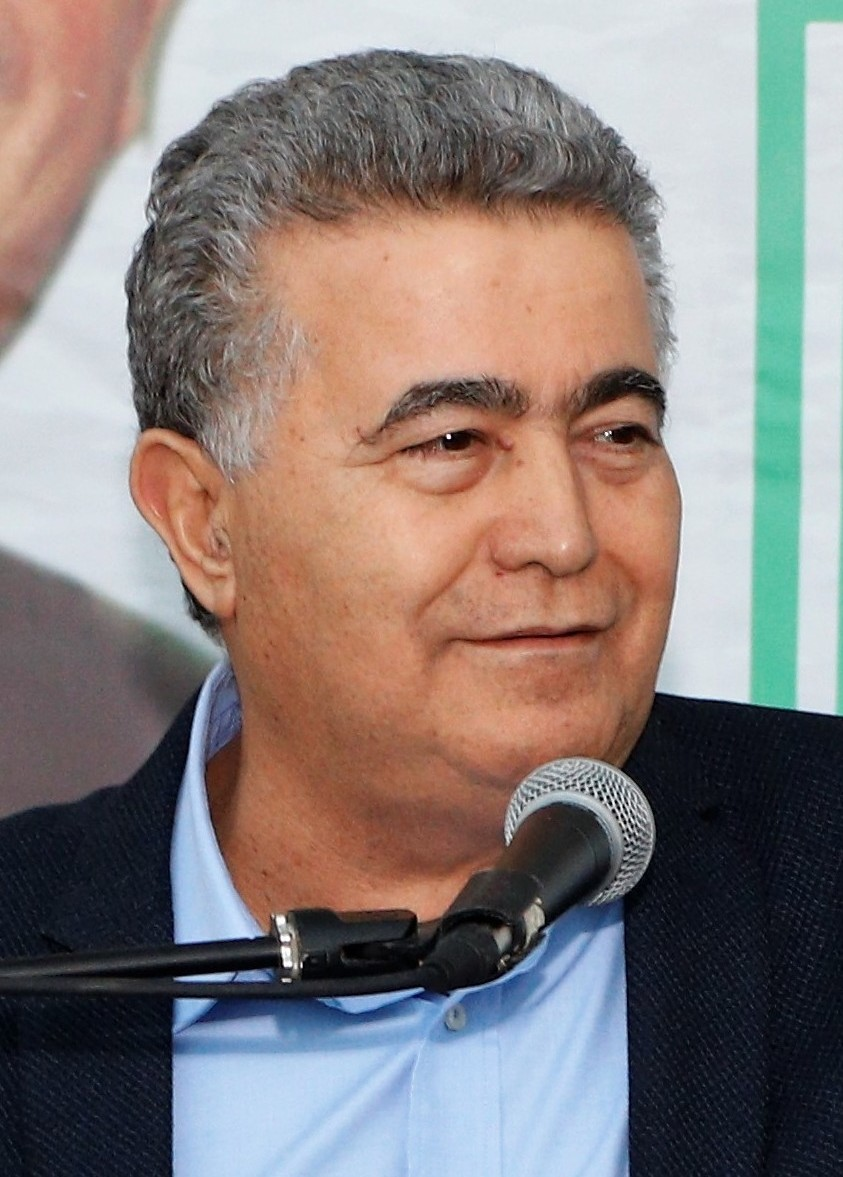

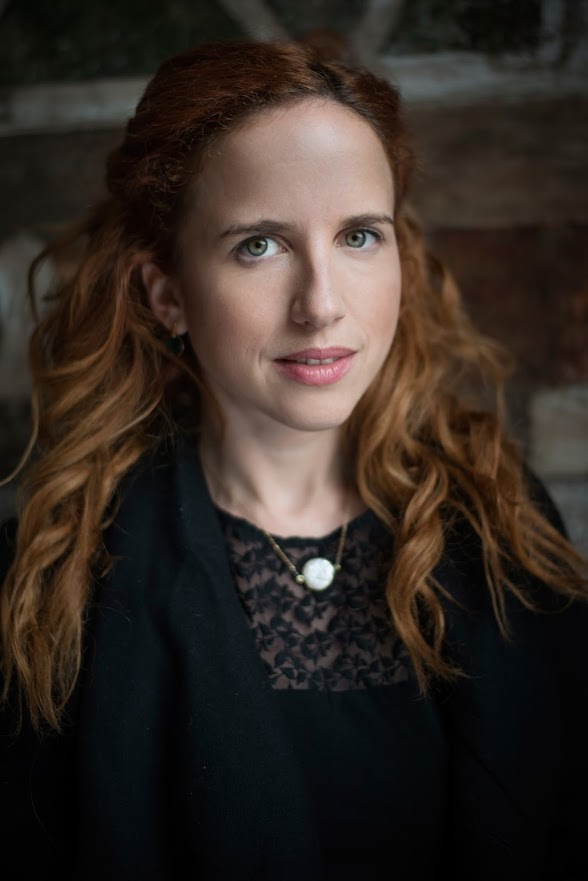

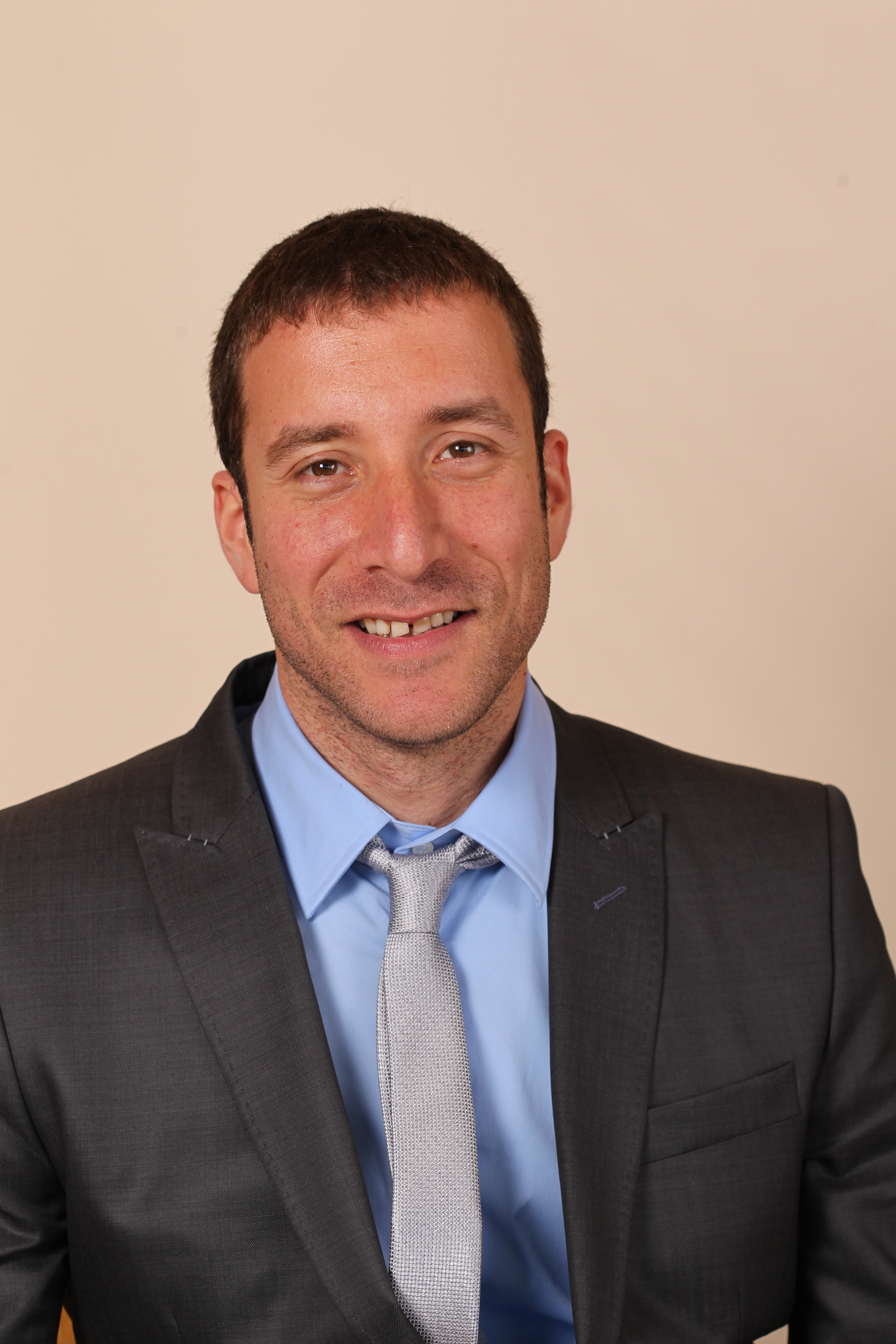
Candidate	Amir Peretz	Stav Shaffir	Itzik Shmuli
Popular Vote	13,886	8,019	7,799
Percentage	46.7%	26.9%	26.2%
Leader before election
Avi Gabbay
Elected Leader
Amir Peretz

The 2019 Israeli Labor Party leadership election was held following the announcement of the resignation of Avi Gabbay as leader of the Labor Party on 7 June 2019, after almost two years as leader, which he led into its worst election result in its history during the April 2019 Israeli legislative election.

The candidates were Amir Peretz, Itzik Shmuli, and Stav Shaffir. The vote of party members was held on 2 July 2019. Amir Peretz won the leadership election with 47% of the vote.

== Background ==
Labor Party leader Avi Gabbay, who faced pressure to resign since he led the party in the April elections to its worst-ever showing, announced on 19 May 2019 that he would not run for re-election as leader of Labor, and that the party would hold primaries to select a new leader for the upcoming September elections.

The leadership election was officially called on 7 June 2019.

== Election rules ==
Leadership elections in the Israeli Labor Party happen in a two-round vote, with the two leading candidates from the first round advancing into a run-off. If a candidate wins over 40% of the vote in the first round, he wins automatically, and the second round is cancelled.

== Candidates ==
Three major candidates ran in the Labor leadership election (and one minor candidate, David Landsman). All three major candidates were current Knesset members of the Labor Party. Due to the Labor Party's low standing in the polls, the campaign mainly focused on what parties the Labor Party should unite with to increase its power and remain above the Electoral threshold.

=== Amir Peretz ===
Amir Peretz was a Member of the Knesset for the Labor Party and served as its leader between 2006 and 2007; as leader of the Labor Party he brought the party to 19 seats in the Knesset and it became the second largest party in the Knesset. Notably, he received a large number of votes in Likud strongholds. After the elections, he joined Ehud Olmert's government as the Minister of Defense and served in that role from 2006-2007. After losing the leadership of the Labor Party to Ehud Barak, he left the party to join Tzipi Livni's Hatnuah. As part of Hatnuah, he served as Minister of the Environment from 2013-2014. During the Labor-Hatnuah joint list known as the Zionist Union, he returned to the Labor Party. In the primaries leading up to the April 2019 elections, Peretz fell behind some of the younger members of his party, and was placed sixth on the party's list. After the party's failure in the April elections, Peretz became his party's most veteran MK.

Peretz declared his candidacy for leader of the Labor Party on 2 June 2019. Peretz's campaign was focused on showcasing his many endorsements by former Labor Knesset Members and other leftist figures, and made use of his iconic mustache as its logo and the slogan "Now Amir". Peretz declared his intention to remain independent of Ehud Barak's party, and to refrain from uniting with Meretz; instead, he declared that he wishes to invite Orly Levy's Gesher, Tzipi Livni's Hatnuah, Yuval Diskin, and Gadi Eizenkot to enter a joint list with the Labor Party. Peretz was criticized by the other leadership candidates of putting his personal interests in front of the interests of the leftist bloc due to his refusal to give up leadership of the leftist bloc to Ehud Barak.

=== Itzik Shmuli ===
Itzik Shmuli was a Member of the Knesset for the Labor Party. Shmuli was elected chairman of the National Union of Israeli Students in October 2010. As the leader of the Students Union, Shmuli was one of leaders of the 2011 Israeli social justice protests, along with fellow leadership candidate Stav Shaffir and the social activist Daphni Leef. Shmuli and Shaffir joined the Labor Party in 2012, and became the young faces of one of Israel's oldest parties. During his time in the Knesset, Shmuli was focused on matters of social justice (such as increasing funds for the elderly). Shmuli is a member of the LGBT community, and is an activist for LGBT rights. In the primaries leading up to the April 2019 elections, Shmuli won the first place, with 90% of the vote, and was placed third on the party's list.

Shmuli declared his candidacy for leader of the Labor Party on 12 June 2019. Shmuli's campaign used the slogan "Believing in Labor" and was focused on restoring the belief lost in Labor after its failure in the April elections. Shmuli declared his intention to unite with Ehud Baraks new party "on his first day in office" even if Barak received the leading position in such an alliance. Like Barak, Shmuli supported a wide coalition including all the parties in Israel's left-centre bloc.

=== Stav Shaffir ===
Stav Shaffir was a Member of the Knesset for the Labor Party. Shaffir came into the public eye as one of leaders of the 2011 Israeli social justice protests, which she led together with fellow leadership candidate Shmuli and social activist Daphni Leef. Shaffir joined the Labor Party in May 2012, and in the 2013 Israeli legislative election, she was elected to the Knesset at age 27, becoming the youngest MK in Israeli history. During her tenure in the Knesset, Shaffir focused on matters of social justice (such as rent regulation), financial transparency, and feminism. In the primaries leading up to the April 2019 elections, Shaffir fell just short of her partner and rival Shmuli, winning the second place. Shaffir was placed fourth on the party's list for the April elections.

Shaffir declared her candidacy for leader of the Labor Party on 7 June 2019. Shaffir's campaign focused on her social record as MK and her youth, using the slogan "Starting again" and using Orange as its campaign color due to Shaffir's distinctive Ginger hair. Shaffir has declared her intention to create a leftist bloc with Ehud Barak's new party, Meretz, and other leftist forces, but has criticized Shmuli for "selling the party" to Barak, and has said that she will take a harder stance on keeping Labor a major part of this bloc. Shaffir has suggested she may leave Labor if she doesn't win the leadership primary; she left Labor on 25 July 2019, and joined the Democratic Union, an alliance of Meretz and the Israel Democratic Party.

== Results ==
Candidate	Votes	%
Turnout: 45.6%
Amir Peretz ✓	13,886	46.7%
Stav Shaffir	8,019	26.9%
Itzik Shmuli	7,799	26.2%
David Landsman	19	0.06%
Total	29,774	—N/a
