= 2017 Israeli Labor Party leadership election =

Israeli Labor Party leadership election

- 4–10 July 2017

vote by general membership of party
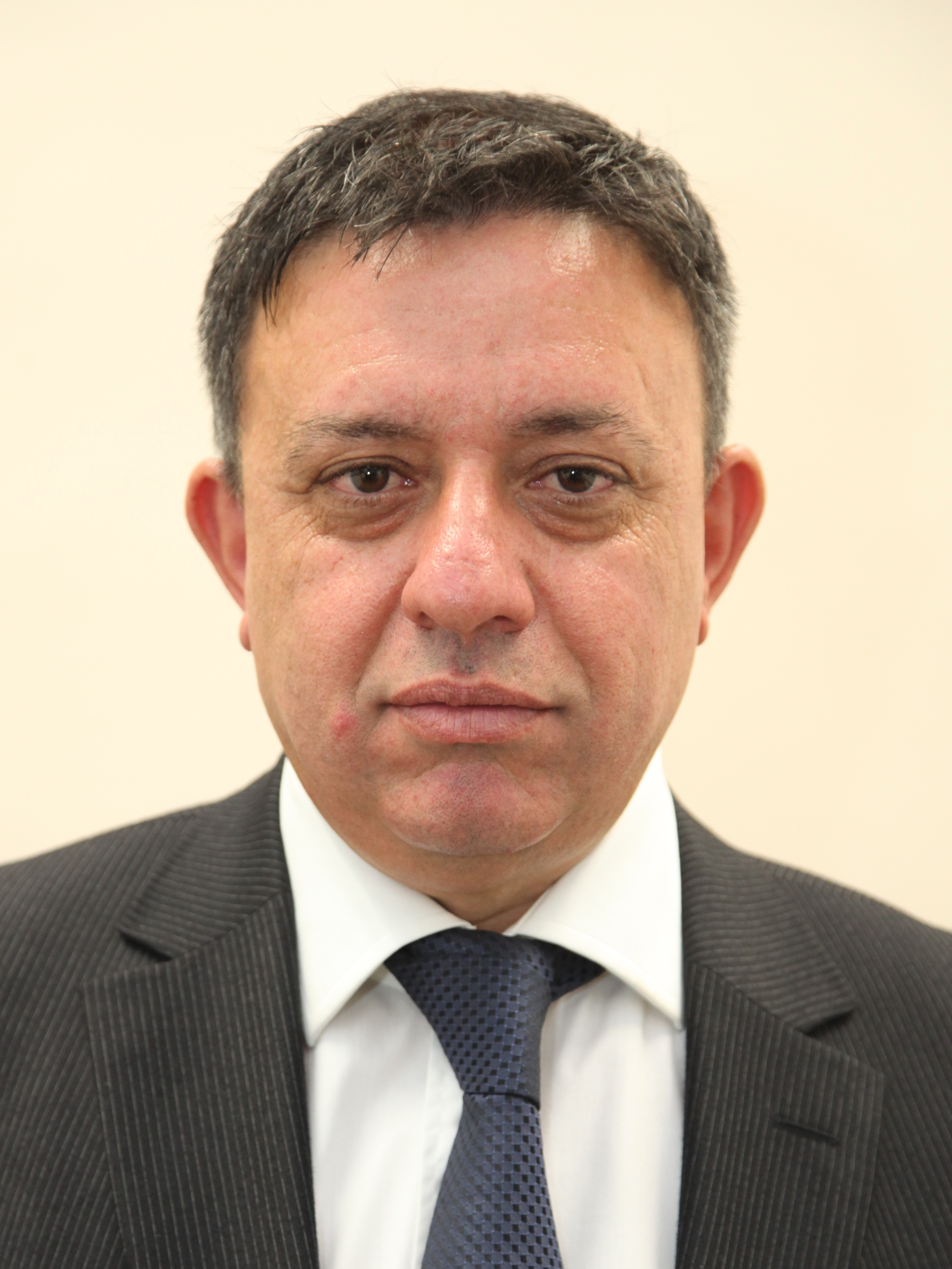

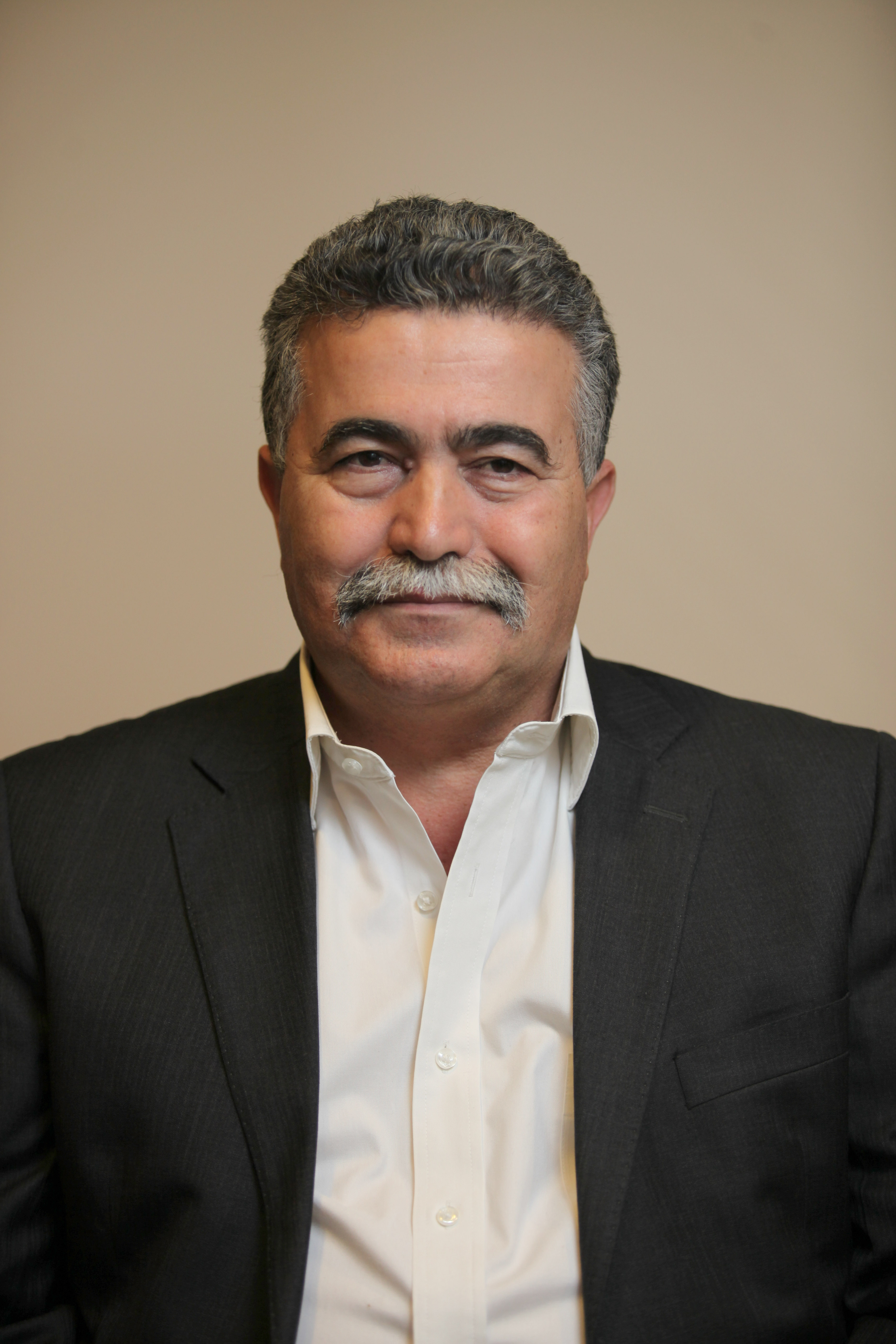

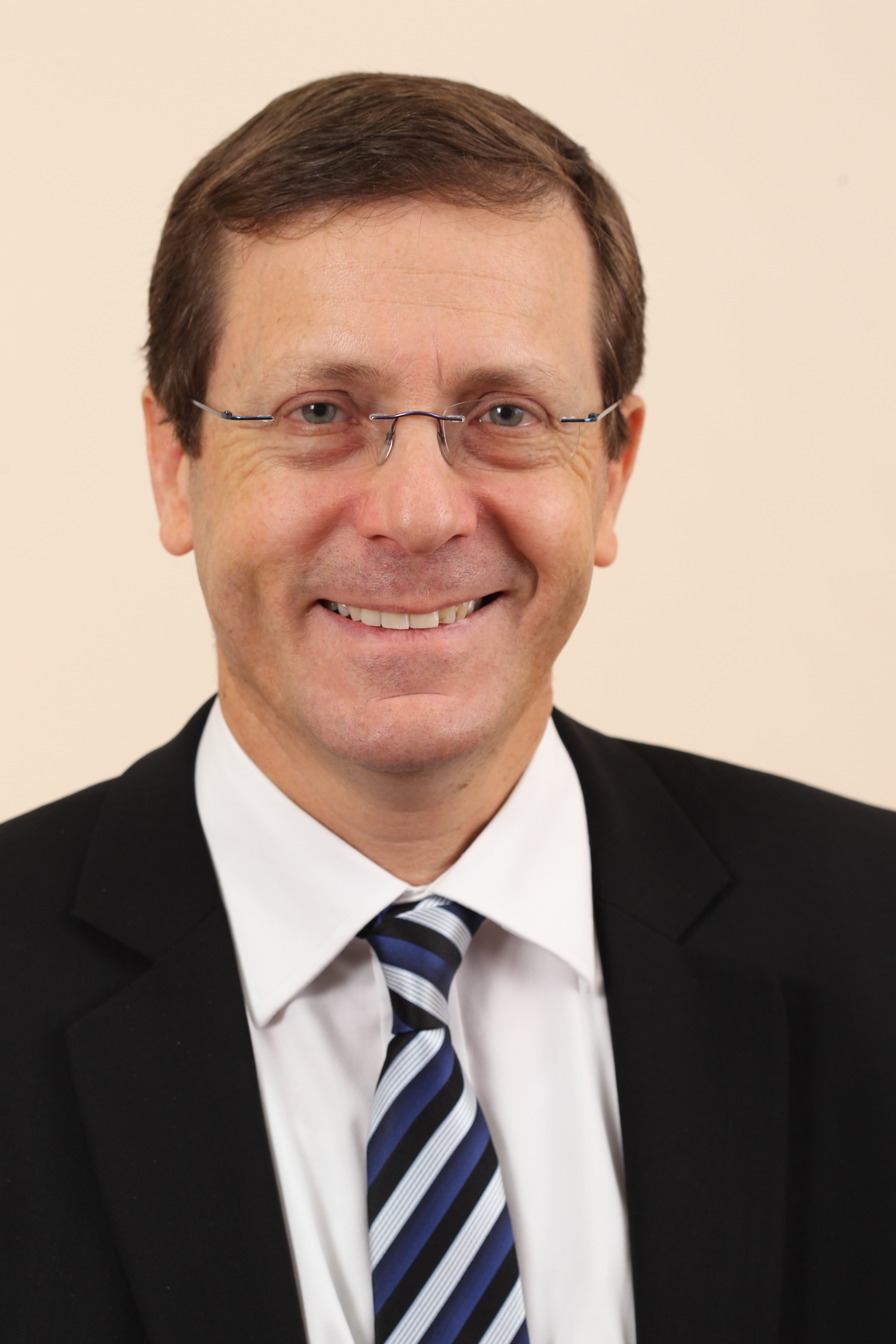

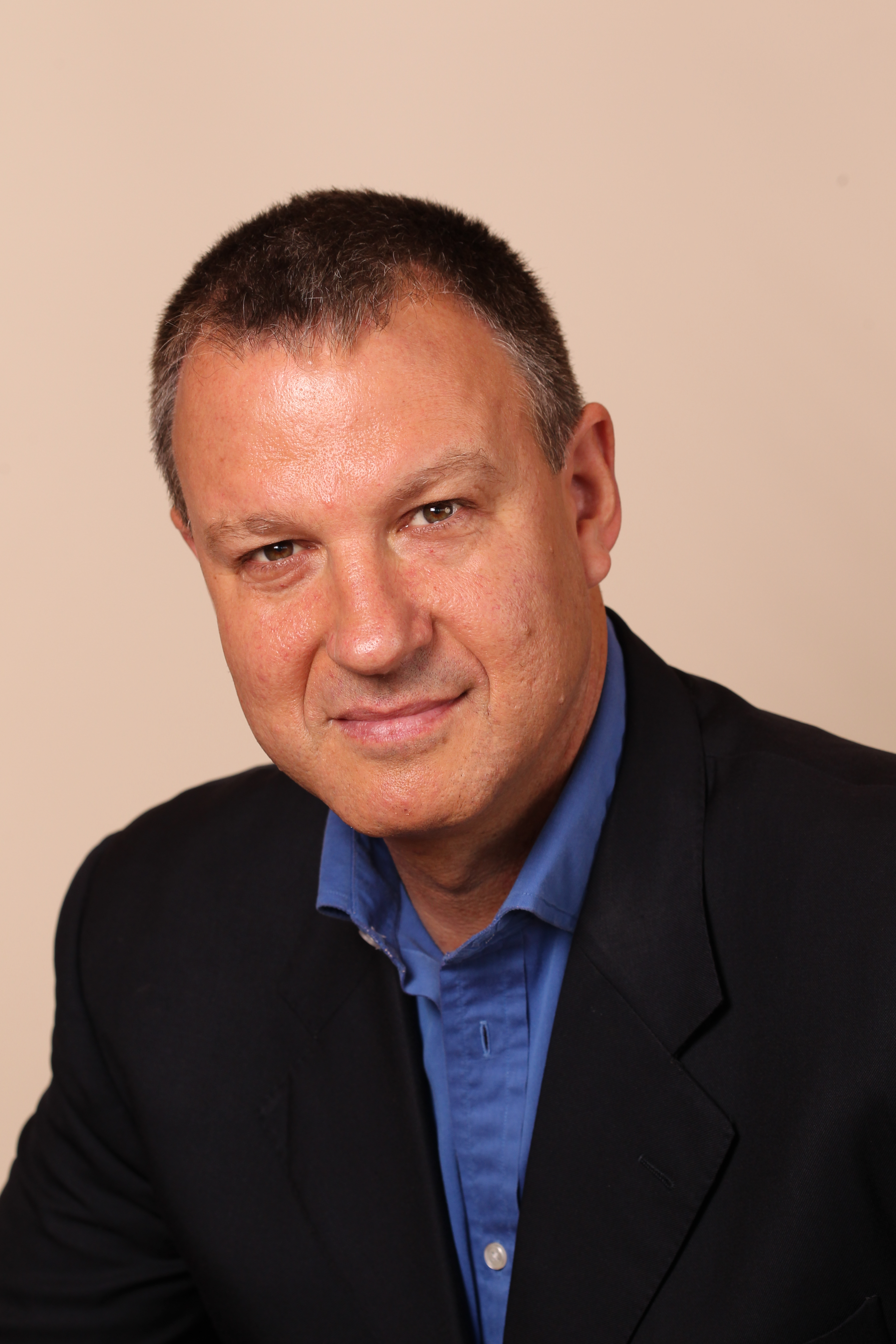

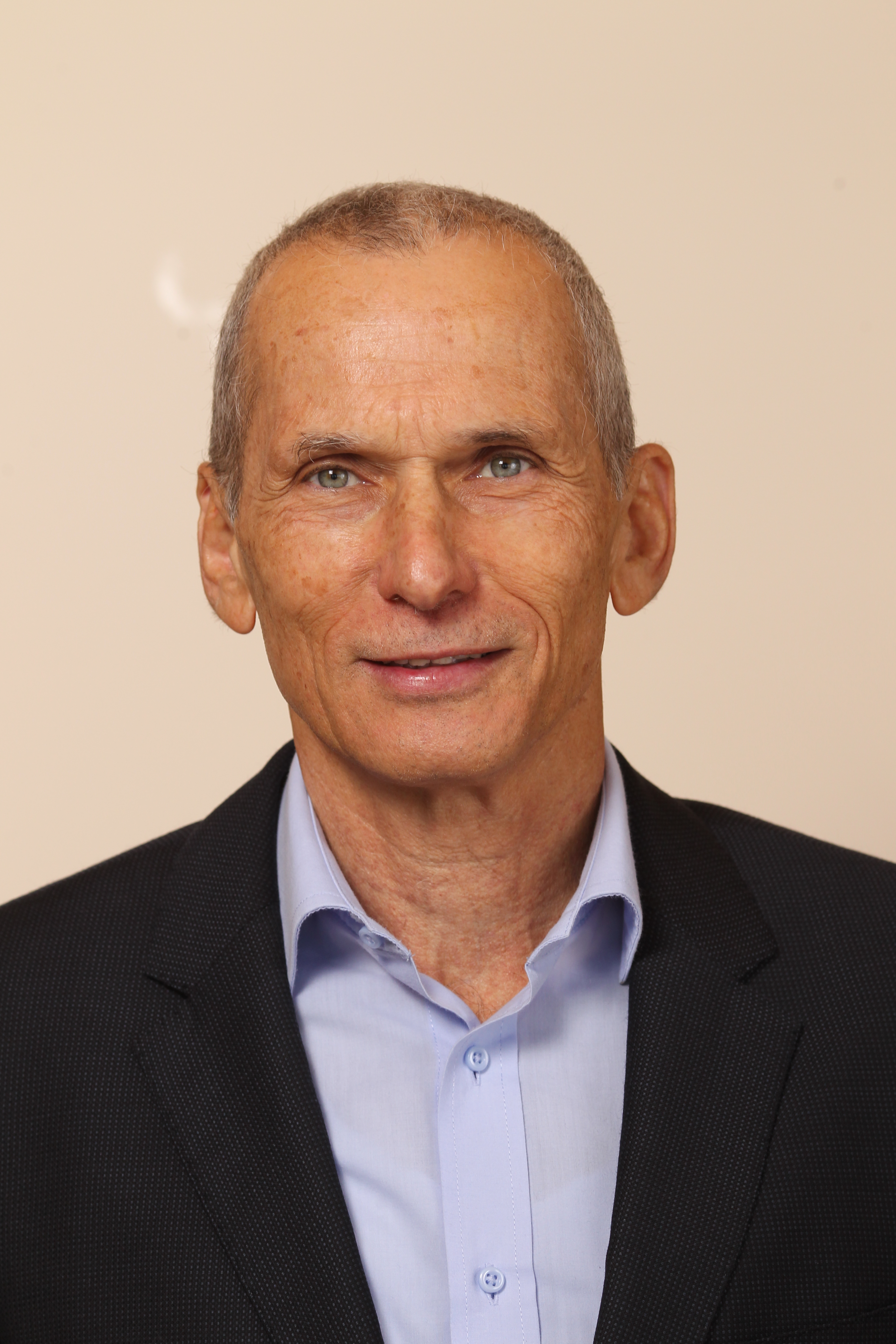
Candidate	Avi Gabbay	Amir Peretz	Isaac Herzog
First round	8,395; 27.0%	10,141; 32.7%	5,204; 16.7%
Runoff	16,080; 52.2%	14,734; 47.8%
Candidate	Erel Margalit	Omer Bar-Lev
First round	4,697; 16.1%	2,147; 6.9%
Leader before election
Isaac Herzog
Elected Leader
Avi Gabbay

The 2017 Israeli Labor Party leadership election was held in July 2017. The first round of voting took place on 4 July. Since none of the candidates won at least 40 percent of the vote, a second round of voting took place in which the two candidates who won the most votes in the first round, Avi Gabbay and Amir Peretz, ran. The second round of voting took place on 10 July, with Avi Gabbay winning 52.2% of the vote.

== Results ==
Candidate	First round		Second round	
Candidate	Votes	%	Votes	%
Turnout: 59%
Avi Gabbay ✓	8,395	27%	16,080	52.2%
Amir Peretz	10,141	32.7%	14,734	47.8%
Isaac Herzog	5,204	16.7%		
Erel Margalit	4,697	16.1%		
Omer Bar-Lev	2,147	6.9%		
Avner Ben-Zaken	56	0.18%		
Hod Krovi	8	0.03%		
Total	30,648	N/A	30,814	N/A
