= Noy (political faction) =

Noy נוי
- Leader: David Tal
- Founded: 23 May 2005
- Dissolved: 23 November 2005
- Split from: One Nation
- Merged into: Kadima
- Most MKs: 1 (2005)
- Fewest MKs: 1 (2005)

Noy (Hebrew: נוי) was a short-lived one-man political faction in Israel created by David Tal.

== Background ==
Noy was established by Haredi Knesset member David Tal on 23 May 2005. Previously Tal had been a member of One Nation, which was about to merge into the Israeli Labor Party, a move Tal was opposed to.

On 23 November 2005 the faction was dissolved when Tal merged it into Ariel Sharon's new Kadima party.
