= Ilana Cohen =

Israeli politician (1943–2026)

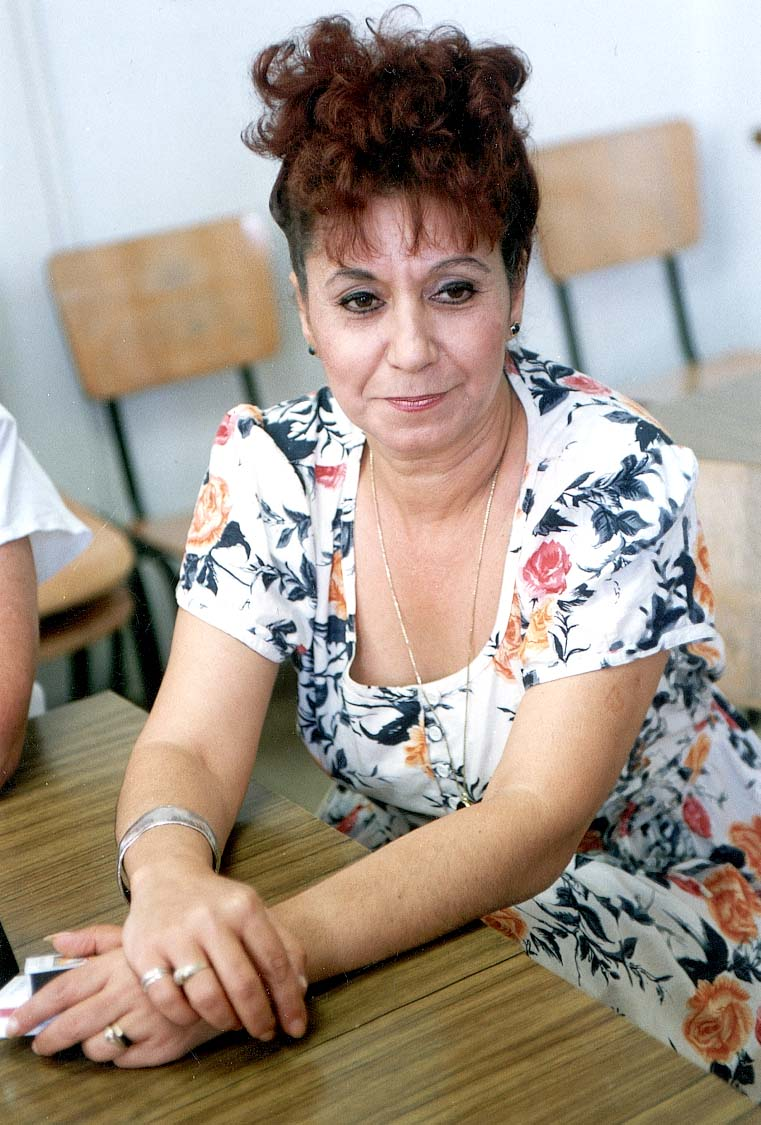
- Cohen during her time in the Knesset

Faction represented in the Knesset
- 2003–2005: One Nation
- 2005–2006: Labor Party

Personal details
- Born: 16 November 1943 Iraq
- Died: 21 June 2026 (aged 82) Rishon LeZion, Israel

Ilana Cohen (Hebrew: אילנה כהן; 16 November 1943 – 21 June 2026) was an Israeli politician who served as a member of the Knesset for One Nation and the Labor Party from 2003 until 2006.

== Life and career ==
Born in Iraq, Cohen emigrated to Israel in 1949. She worked as a nurse and chaired the Nurses' Union from the early 1990s until 2024.

In 2003 she was elected to the Knesset on the One Nation list. In 2005 the party merged into the Labor Party. She lost her seat in the 2006 elections, having decided to retire from politics.

Cohen died on 21 June 2026 at the age of 82.
