= One Nation (Israel) =

One Nation עם אחד
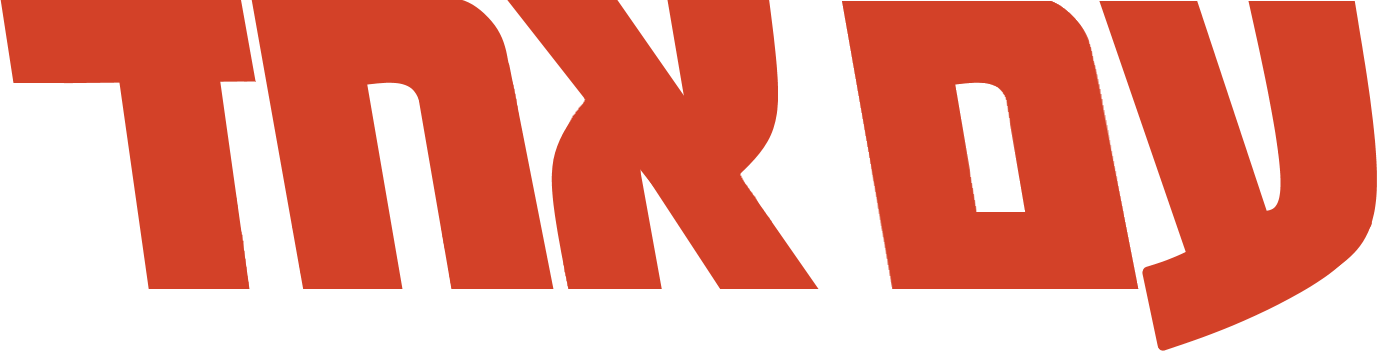
- Leader: Amir Peretz
- Founded: 25 March 1999
- Dissolved: 23 May 2005
- Split from: Labor Party
- Merged into: Labor Party
- Ideology: Social democracy Trade union interests Labor Zionism
- Political position: Center-left to left-wing
- Most MKs: 3 (1999, 2003–2005)
- Fewest MKs: 2 (1999–2003)

Election symbol
- ם

Website
- am1.org.il

One Nation (Hebrew: עם אחד, romanized: Am Ehad, lit. 'One People') was a political party in Israel.

== History ==
Original logo of One Nation at the time of its establishment in 1999

The party was established on 25 March 1999 when Amir Peretz, Rafik Haj Yahia, and Adisu Massala broke away from the Israeli Labor Party to form a new faction.

In the May 1999 elections the party won 1.9% of the vote, equivalent to two seats, and was the smallest party to cross the electoral threshold of 1.5%. The seats were taken by Peretz and Haim Katz. Prior to the 2003 elections Katz left the party to join Likud.

In the elections One Nation won three seats, taken by Peretz, Ilana Cohen and David Tal. On 23 May 2005 the party merged back into the Labor Party, although Tal refused to join and established his own faction, Noy, which later merged into Kadima.
