= Adisu Massala =

Israeli politician

- אדיסו מאסלה
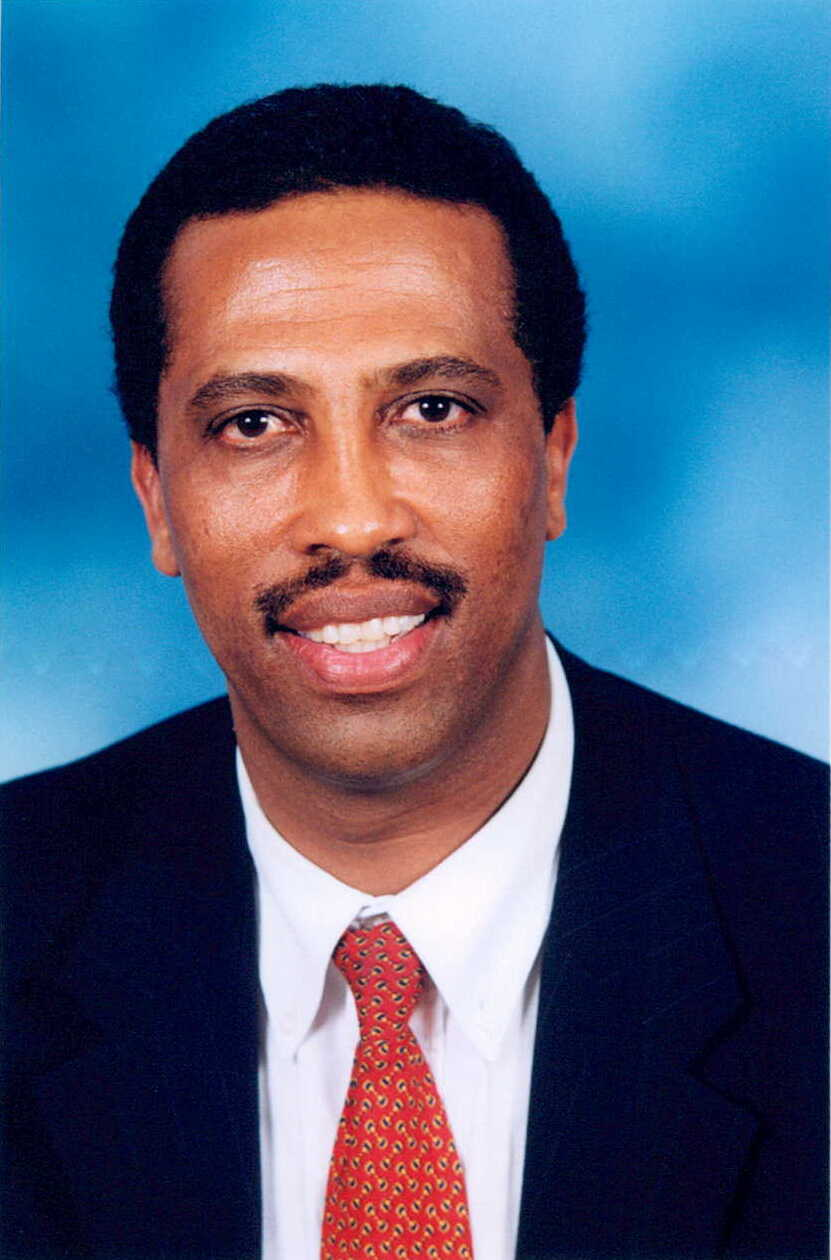

Faction represented in the Knesset
- 1996–1999: Labor Party
- 1999: One Nation

Personal details
- Born: 16 June 1961 (age 64) Gondar, Ethiopia

Adisu Massala (Hebrew: אדיסו מאסלה, Amharic: አዲሱ መሰለ Addīsū Messele; born 16 June 1961) is an Israeli politician. Born in Ethiopia, Massala served in the Knesset from 1996 to 1999.

== Biography ==
Adisu Masala was born in Gondar province, Ethiopia. He made aliyah in 1980 after crossing the Ethiopia–Sudan border and boarding a plane bound for Israel. He studied social work and mechanical engineering at Bar-Ilan University, gaining a BA and went on to work as a social worker. He also became chairman of the United Ethiopian Jewish Organisation.

== Political career ==
Masala was elected to the Knesset in the 1996 elections on the Labor Party list. However, he was one of three MKs to break away from the party to form One Nation, led by Amir Peretz. Adisu was placed fourth on the party's list for the 1999 elections, but lost his seat as the party won only two seats.

He was placed fourth on the One Nation list again for the 2003 elections, but was not elected as the party won only three seats.
