= Omer Bar-Lev =

Israeli politician (born 1953)

- עֹמר בר־לב
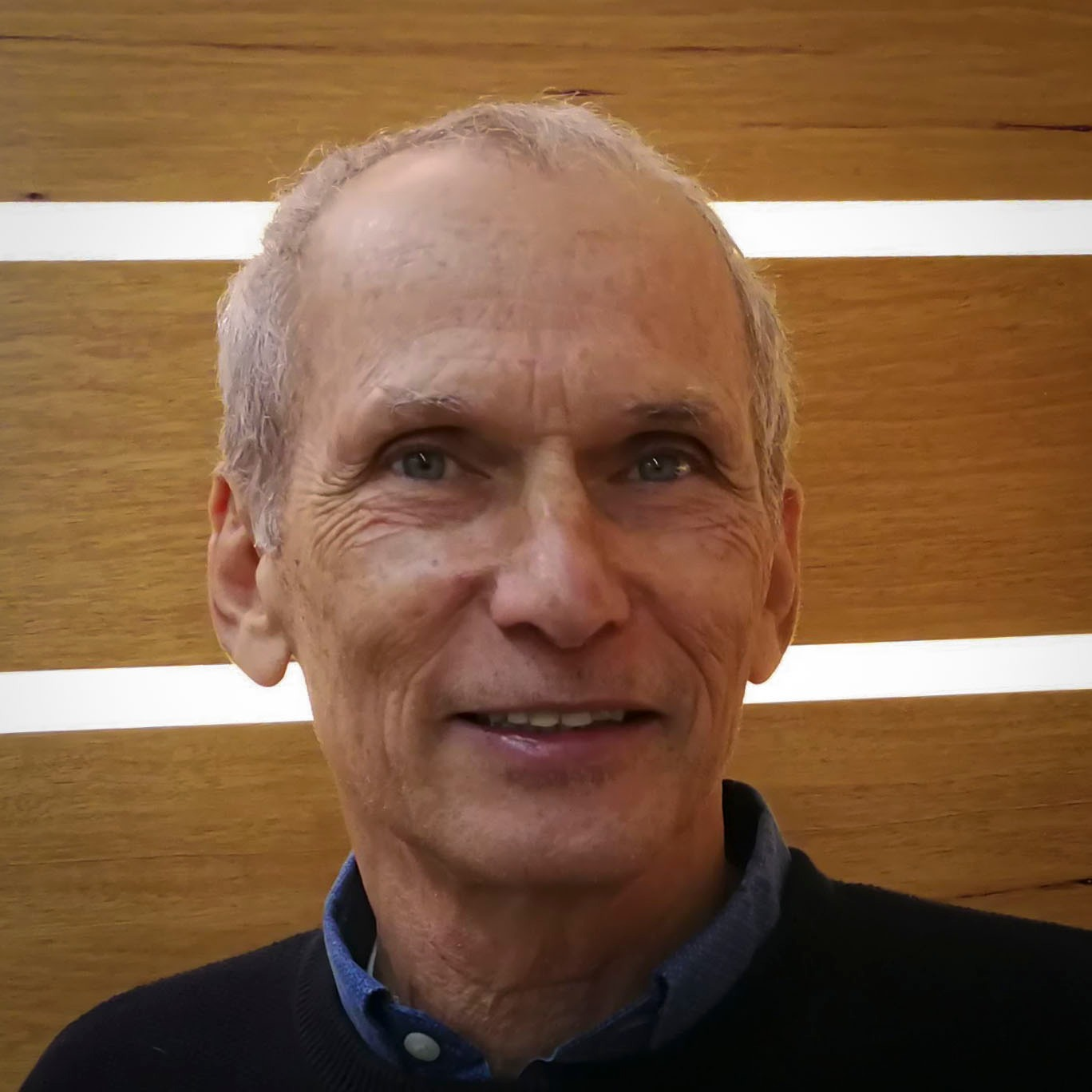
- Bar-Lev in 2020

Ministerial roles
- 2021–2022: Minister of Public Security

Faction represented in the Knesset
- 2013–2015: Labor Party
- 2015–2019: Zionist Union
- 2019–2020: Labor Party
- 2021: Labor Party

Personal details
- Born: 2 October 1953 (age 73) Haifa, Israel

Omer Israel Bar-Lev (Hebrew: עֹמר ישראל בר־לב; born 2 October 1953) is an Israeli politician who formerly served as Minister of Public Security. He was previously a member of the Knesset for the Israeli Labor Party. He was placed seventh on the party's list for the 2013 Israeli legislative election, and serves as the Party's point person on issues of peace and defense. Bar-Lev is an IDF reserve officer with the rank of colonel (Aluf mishne), who was commander of the Sayeret Matkal elite commando unit between 1984 and 1987.

== Biography ==
Omer Bar-Lev was born in Haifa, Israel to an Ashkenazi Jewish family with origins from Austria. His father is former IDF Chief of Staff and government minister Haim Bar-Lev. Bar-Lev is married again to Tami, a video editor, and the father of three children. He attended Tichon Hadash high school in Tel Aviv.

== Military career ==
He was drafted in 1971 and went on to command Israel's most elite special forces unit Sayeret Matkal and later the Jordan Valley Brigade. During his service in Sayeret Matkal, Bar-Lev took part in famous operations including the Savoy Hotel and Entebbe. In the early 1990s, Bar-Lev served as a member of the IDF's negotiations with the Palestinians that led to the Gaza–Jericho Agreement, and later to the negotiations that led to the Israel–Jordan peace treaty.

Over the span of his military career, which lasted from 1971 to 1994, Bar-Lev left the IDF twice. In the late 1970s, Bar-Lev studied agronomy and agriculture at the Hebrew University's Faculty of Agriculture at Rehovot and received his B.Sc. in 1980. After commanding Sayeret Matkal, Bar-Lev left the army again in 1987 in order to study for his master's degree in international relations at Tel Aviv University. As part of his M.A. studies, Bar-Lev wrote a thesis on potential security arrangements with Syria, which later became the book entitled Security Arrangements in the Golan for the Age of Modern Warfare. He also joined a group of reserve soldiers who, in 1978, wrote a letter to Prime Minister Menachem Begin urging him to sign a peace deal with Egypt.

== Business career ==
After retiring from the IDF in 1994 with the rank of colonel, Bar-Lev became a technology entrepreneur and social activist. Among other positions, he was, from 2001 to 2013, the Founder and CEO of Paieon, Inc., a medical imaging company.

== Political career ==
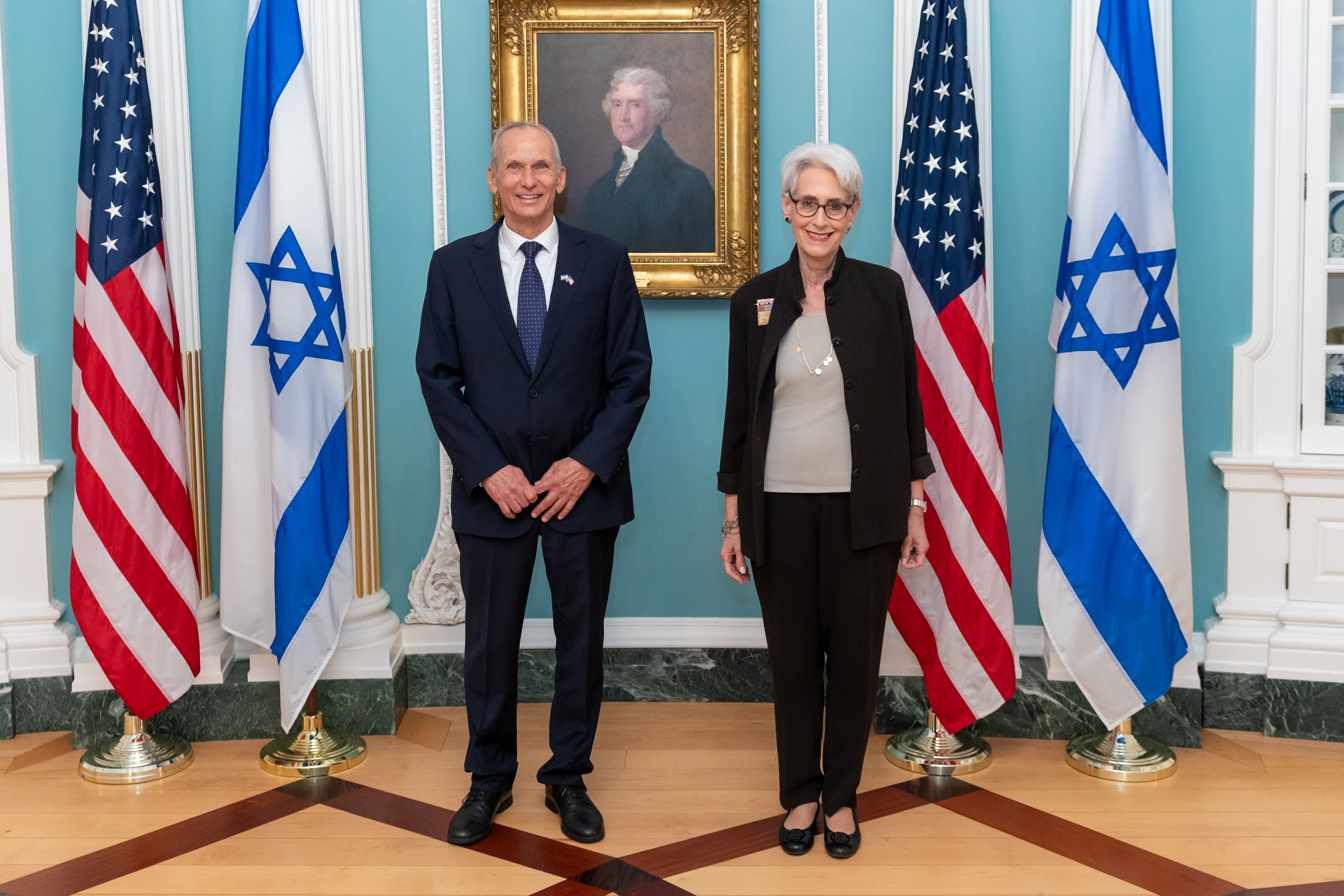
Bar-Lev with US Deputy secretary of State Wendy Sherman in 2022

After the assassination of Yitzhak Rabin, Bar-Lev joined the organization "Generation of Peace", and within this framework, he founded the movement "Acharai", a slogan used in the IDF to mean "Follow me" and is used to galvanize a group towards a common goal. Acharai works to empower marginalized Israeli youth and educate them in democracy and Zionism. Over the past 15 years, Acharai worked with some 20,000 youth, and today enrolls about 4,000 participants in its programs annually.

In 2012, Bar-Lev decided to run for Knesset with the Israeli Labor Party, and was chosen as the number seven on its candidates list. With the 2013 national elections, in which Labor won 15 seats, Bar-Lev became a Member of the 19th Knesset, which was formed as a result of those elections. He serves as a member on the Foreign Affairs and Defense Committee, a member of the Ad-hoc Committee for the "Equal Sharing of the Burden" Bill, chair of the Lobby for Advancement of Youth on the Periphery, chair of the Lobby for the Promotion of the Needs of the Bedouin Population, and co-chair of the Agricultural Lobby. In 2013, Bar-Lev published "It's in Our Hands", a political initiative with proposals for both bilateral and independent moves that Israel should take to maintain its democratic and Jewish character. The plan reiterates the urgency of reaching a political solution to the conflict with the Palestinians and suggests several innovative solutions to sticking points in previous negotiations, for example, mutual land-leases between Israel and the PA to address security and resource concerns. However, the plan argues that in the event that negotiations fail, Israel must take proactive steps to maintain its identity. To this end, Bar-Lev proposed a series of partial Israeli withdrawals from the West Bank aimed at minimizing the number of Palestinians living under IDF military rule and transferring responsibility for those areas to the PA.

Bar-Lev ran for the leadership of the Labor Party in 2017, and won 6.9% of the vote in the first round. In the 2021 Israeli legislative election, he was placed second on the Israeli Labor Party list and became the minister of national security in the Thirty-sixth government of Israel. In the 2022 Israeli legislative election, he was placed ninth on the Israeli Labor Party list, remaining outside the Knesset as the party gained only four seats.

After the 2022 Beersheba attack, Bar-Lev was criticized for a statement he made at the funeral of one of the victims, promising to jail the terrorist who committed the attack. The terrorist died during the attack. He was also criticized for omitting that the victim was killed due to her Jewish faith.

== Honors ==
In 2011 Bar-Lev was honored as one of the torchbearers in the national Israeli Independence Day ceremony.
