= Avi Gabbay =

Israeli businessman and politician

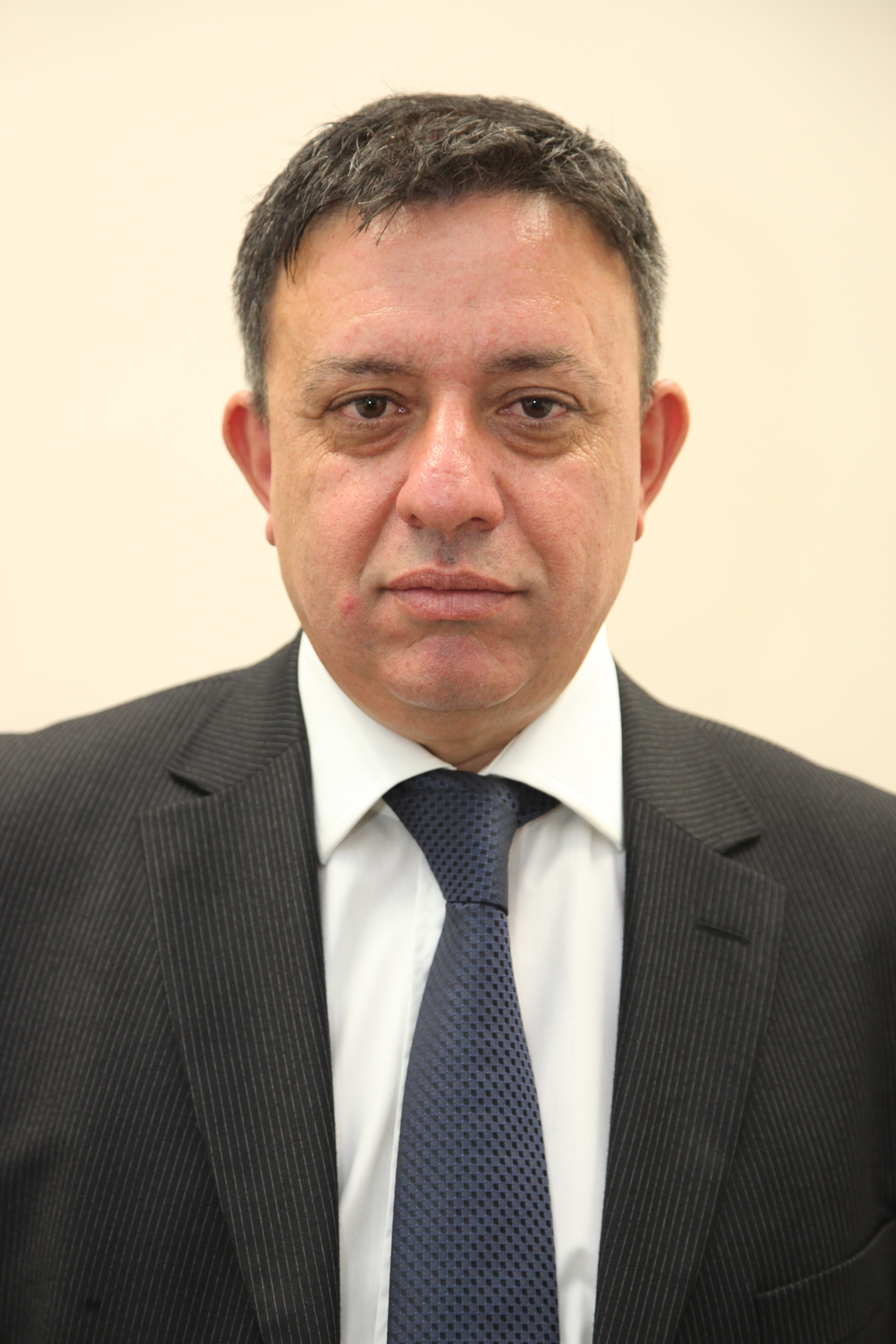
- Gabbay in 2015

Ministerial roles
- 2015–2016: Minister of Environmental Protection

Faction represented in the Knesset
- 2019: Labor Party

Personal details
- Born: 22 February 1967 (age 59) Jerusalem, Israel

Avraham "Avi" Gabbay (Hebrew: אַבְרָהָם "אָבִי" גַּבַּאי; born 22 February 1967) is an Israeli businessman and politician. He was CEO of the telecommunications company Bezeq from 2007 to 2013, then entered politics. He served as Minister of Environmental Protection between 2015 and 2016 as a member of the Kulanu party, before being elected leader of the Israeli Labor Party in 2017. He was elected to the Knesset in April 2019, but resigned as leader shortly afterwards. He did not run in the September 2019 elections. After leaving politics, Gabbay returned to the business world. He is currently the CEO of Partner.

== Early life and career ==
Gabbay was born in the Baka neighbourhood of Jerusalem, the seventh of eight children born to Moïse and Sara Gabbay, Jewish immigrants from Morocco originally from Casablanca. His father worked for Bezeq, and in his youth he would also work at his father's company during his vacations. He studied at the Geulim primary school and attended high school at the Gymnasia Rehavia. After graduating from high school, he did his national service in the Israel Defense Forces in the Intelligence Corps, reaching the rank of Lieutenant. After leaving the army, he completed a BA in economics and an MBA at the Hebrew University of Jerusalem.

Gabbay began his career by working for the Ministry of Finance for four and a half years.

== Business career ==
In 1998 he joined Bezeq as an assistant to CEO Ami Harel. Soon afterwards, he was appointed Vice President of Human Resources, and shortly after that, became the Vice President of Economics and Regulation. In 2003, he was appointed CEO of Bezeq International. In 2007, after Bezeq CEO Yaakov Gelbard was forced to resign, Gabbay was appointed CEO of Bezeq. He served in this position until he left the company in 2013. During his 14 years of working with Bezeq, Gabbay became wealthy, and is thought to have earned about 50 million shekels ($14.1 million). Shortly before entering politics, he tried and failed to buy control of El Al, Israel's national airline. In January 2020, Gabbay become CEO of telecommunications company Cellcom.

== Political career ==
=== Kulanu Party ===
Prior to the 2015 Knesset elections he was amongst the founders of the new Kulanu party. Despite not being elected to the Knesset, he was appointed Minister of Environmental Protection in the Netanyanu government. On 27 May 2016, he submitted his resignation from the government in protest at the appointment of Avigdor Lieberman as Minister of Defense and the coalition's shift to the right.

=== Labor Party ===
On 29 December 2016 Gabbay announced he would join the Israeli Labor Party, and on 4 March 2017 announced he would run for the Labor Party leadership in the intra-party election for the leadership of the Israeli Labor Party, held in July 2017. The announcement was unusual because he was not a sitting Knesset member at the time. In the first round Amir Peretz came first with 32.7% and Gabbay came second with 27.08%; In the second round on 10 July Gabbay won with 52.4% of the vote. Since Gabbay was not a Knesset member, he led the party from outside of the Knesset. In addition, usually the head of the largest opposition party in the Knesset gets the official title of Leader of the Opposition. Instead Isaac Herzog, the outgoing leader of the Labor Party, retained the title of Leader of the Opposition in the Knesset. Following Herzog's resignation in July 2018, Tzipi Livni took over the post and following the dissolution of the Zionist Union, former Labor chief Shelly Yachimovich succeeded her.

On 1 January 2019 Gabbay unilaterally announced the dissolution of the Zionist Union and the cessation of partnership with Hatnuah.

In January 2019 his autobiography Hakol Efshari ("Everything is Possible") was published.

== Political positions ==
=== Israeli–Palestinian conflict ===
In his political plan, published during the 2017 Labor leadership primaries, Gabbay expressed support for a two-state solution, with the Palestinian state being demilitarized and the settlement blocs and Jordan Valley remaining under Israeli control. The Arab neighborhoods in East Jerusalem would become Area B. Palestinian refugees would receive compensation. The bilateral agreement with the Palestinians would be part of a regional agreement, with the aim of strengthening the moderate Sunni axis vis-à-vis Iran and the Shiite axis. The IDF would be deployed along the Jordan River until the conflict is resolved, maintaining Israeli freedom of action in the West Bank. Construction in the settlements outside the main blocs must be frozen, in order to channel the money so that it will prioritize the periphery and settlement blocs, not isolated settlements ("Dimona and not Amona").

In October 2017, during a television interview, he stated that there was no need to evacuate settlements as part of an agreement. Later, he clarified that he was committed to the two-state solution and the distinction between settlement blocs and isolated settlements, in which construction must be stopped, but that there is no need to draw the borders of future negotiations and its recipe at this stage, including an immediate evacuation of all settlements and an undertaking to evacuate as a starting point for talks, and that any solution that will lead to an agreement should be examined.

Following the President Donald Trump's declaration of recognition of Jerusalem as the capital of Israel, Gabbay was recorded in an interview saying that "undivided Jerusalem" is more important than a political settlement with the Palestinians. However, about six months earlier he explained that "undivided Jerusalem" did not include the Arab neighborhoods on the suburbs of Jerusalem.

In January 2018, he declared that if the negotiations with the Palestinians will fail, a unilateral disengagement should be carried out, and that such a plan does not necessarily require the evacuation of settlements.

=== Economy ===
According to the social-economic plan he published during the 2017 Labor leadership primaries, Gabbay supports an increase in expenditure on social benefits and services along with public sector efficiency measures. He supports the reduction of inequality between central Israel and the periphery, and between Jews and Arabs in the education system. He opposes teachers in the public school system being employed by third-party labor contractors. According to the plan, he supports the public health system and a complete separation with private healthcare, instead favoring expanding public health spending to the OECD average. According to Gabbay, public transport can be a social tool that reduces inequality and contributes to social mobility, and he supports additional investment of NIS 100 billion in public transport over a decade, and supports public transportation over private in infrastructure and accessibility.

Gabbay supports the expansion of the social networks protecting all employees, and is in favor of linking wages to the Consumer Price Index. He also favors linking wages of soldiers serving in combat units to the minimum wage. According to his plan, an equitable taxation system must be created in order to deal with the trends of inequality and deep gaps in Israeli society; in order to reduce the cost of living in Israel, he proposed that there should be an increase in market competition, a reduction in bureaucracy and competition among kosher agencies should be created. In order to cope with the increase in housing prices in Israel, Gabbay proposes building 300,000 housing units within five years, adopting models of affordable housing and changing the planning process in order to shorten the time of construction of apartments.

=== Religion and state ===
Gabbay stated support for public transportation on Shabbat, as well as allowing supermarkets and hang-out places to remain open on Shabbat, Reform conversions, Civil marriage, the Western Wall compromise, and against the "Hadata" (הדתה, "religionization") of schools by the activities of the various associations (Amutot) On the issue of enlisting Ultra orthodox Haredim, on the other hand, he declared that this was unrealistic.

=== Education ===
Gabbay called for reform in the education system in which all streams of education for each sector will be united into one educational stream.

=== LGBT rights ===
Gabbay expressed support for LGBT rights on several occasions, and introduced a legislative package of 24 laws on LGBT rights

=== Holocaust ===
In February 2018 the Polish Prime Minister Mateusz Morawiecki stated that "there were Jewish perpetrators" of the Holocaust, "not only German perpetrators." Gabbay condemned Morawiecki's words: "The blood of millions of Jews cries from the earth of Poland over the distortion of history and the escape from blame. Jews were murdered in the Holocaust and Poles took an active part in their murder. The government of Israel has to be a voice for the millions of murdered and strongly denounce the Polish prime minister's words."

== Personal life ==
Gabbay lives in the Tel Baruch neighborhood of Tel Aviv. He is married to Ayelet, an immigrant from Australia. After a professional career in high tech, she now works as a teaching coordinator and English teacher at a Tel Aviv high school. They have three sons. His family are described as "Likud-voting". He is a sports enthusiast and has participated in several marathons.

== Published works ==
=== In Hebrew ===
- Everything is possible, Yediot Ahronot, 2019 [Hakol Efshari] (ISBN 978-965-564-780-8) (in Hebrew)

Party political offices
Preceded by Isaac Herzog	Leader of the Labor Party; 2017–2019	Succeeded by Amir Peretz
