= Amir Peretz =

Israeli politician

- עמיר פרץ
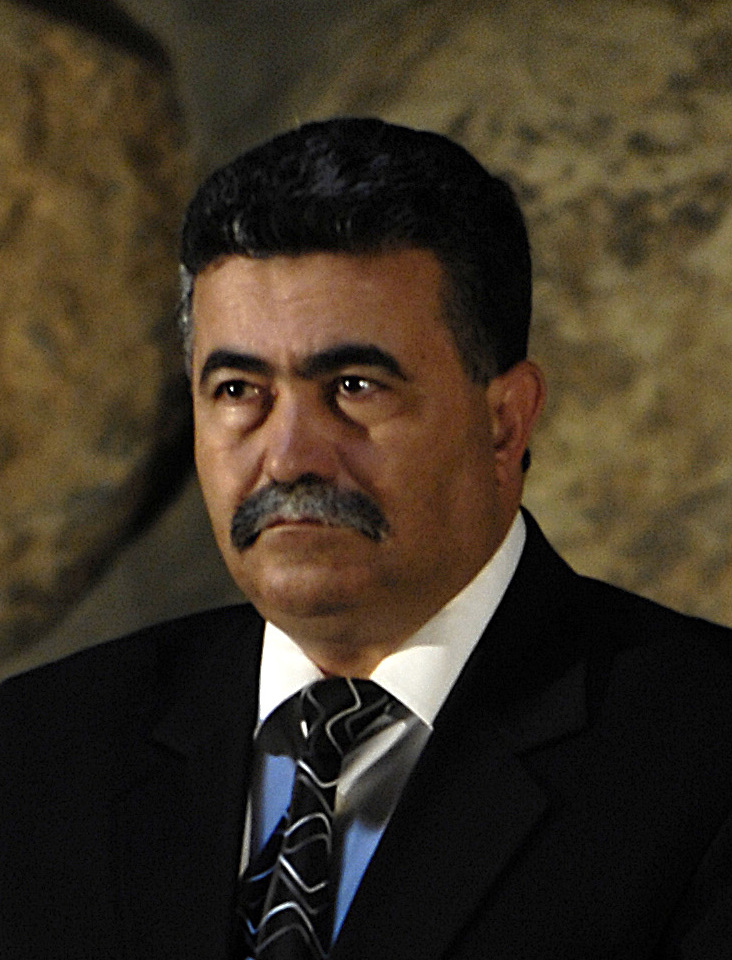
- Peretz in 2007

Leader of the Opposition
- In office 23 November 2005 – 16 January 2006
- Prime Minister: Ariel Sharon
- Preceded by: Tommy Lapid
- Succeeded by: Benjamin Netanyahu

Ministerial roles
- 2006–2007: Minister of Defence
- 2006–2007: Deputy Prime Minister
- 2013–2014: Minister of Environmental Protection
- 2020–2021: Minister of Economy

Faction represented in the Knesset
- 1988–1992: Alignment
- 1992–1999: Labor
- 1999–2004: One Nation
- 2004–2012: Labor
- 2013–2015: Hatnuah
- 2015–2019: Zionist Union
- 2019–2021: Labor

Other roles
- 2005–2007: Leader of the Labor Party
- 2019–2021: Leader of the Labor Party

Personal details
- Born: 9 March 1952 (age 74) Boujad, French Morocco

Amir Peretz (Hebrew: עמיר פרץ; born 9 March 1952) is an Israeli politician who served as a member of the Knesset for the Labor Party. A Knesset member almost continuously from 1988 to 2021, he has served as Minister of Defence, Minister of Economy, and Minister of Environmental Protection, as well as heading the Histadrut trade union federation between 1995 and 2006.

After five years as mayor of Sderot, Peretz first became an MK for the Labor-dominated Alignment in 1988. In 1999 he left Labor to establish his own party, One Nation, which he led until merging it back into Labor in 2004. The following year he defeated Shimon Peres in a Labor leadership election and became Leader of the Opposition. Following the 2006 elections Labor joined the Kadima-led coalition government, with Peretz appointed Minister of Defense and Deputy Prime Minister. His subsequent tenure as Defense Minister included the 2006 Lebanon War and approval of the Iron Dome defence system in early 2007. Midway through 2007 Peretz was defeated by Ehud Barak in another Labor leadership election and resigned from the cabinet.

In December 2012, he resigned from the Knesset after leaving Labor to join the new Hatnuah party, but soon returned to the legislature after being re-elected in the January 2013 elections. Following the elections, Hatnuah joined the coalition government and Peretz was appointed Minister of Environmental Protection. However, he resigned the following year due to his opposition to the government budget. Shortly after the 2015 elections, which Labor and Hatnuah had contested together as the Zionist Union, Peretz rejoined the Labor Party. In 2019 he was elected leader of the party for a second time. He was succeeded by Merav Michaeli on 24 January 2021.

In December 2020, Peretz announced he was running for President of Israel. He left the Knesset on 29 January 2021 and was replaced by Ilan Gilon, a member of Meretz.

== Early life ==
Armand Peretz was born in Boujad, Morocco to a Sephardic Jewish family during the French protectorate. His father David was head of the Jewish community in Boujad. The family emigrated to Israel when Morocco won independence in 1956. They were settled in the then development town of Sderot, Israel, where Peretz grew up until the age of 18. He went to high school in a nearby kibbutz.

Peretz served his compulsory military service in the IDF Artillery wing between 1970 and 1972, and was selected as an officer in the Israel Defense Forces as the brigade ordnance officer of the 202nd paratroopers brigade and reached the rank of captain. On 22 April 1974, Peretz was badly wounded in an accident at the Mitla Pass. He spent a year in the hospital recuperating. After leaving the hospital, he bought a farm in the village of Nir Akiva. Still in a wheelchair, he began growing vegetables and flowers for export. During this period he met his wife Ahlama and they married. They have four children.

== Political career ==
=== Mayor of Sderot ===
In 1983 Peretz ran for the office of mayor of Sderot, as candidate of the Israel Labor Party. He won, ending a long period of dominance of the town's politics by the right-wing Likud party and the National Religious Party. It was the first in a series of local councils that passed back to Labor control in the late 1980s. As mayor, he emphasised education and worked to improve previously fractious relations with the kibbutzim in the area.

=== Histadrut and 'One Nation' ===
In 1988 he was elected a member of the Knesset. In 1994, after failing in a previous bid for Histadrut leadership, Peretz joined forces with Haim Ramon to contest control of the then powerful trade union federation. They ran on an independent list against the favoured candidate of then Labor leader Yitzhak Rabin. They won, and Peretz became Ramon's deputy at the Histadrut, isolating him within the Labor Party. He became chairman of the Histadrut in December 1995, when Ramon reentered the cabinet following Rabin's assassination. During his early years at the helm of the Histadrut, Peretz was regarded as a militant firebrand, with an easy hand on the trigger of general strikes. Sometimes the pretext for declaring a general strike would be an inopportune statement by the finance minister, as had been the case with Ya'akov Ne'eman in 1996.

However, in his later years as head of Histadrut, Peretz was seen as becoming much more moderate, as he moved toward a potential run for national office. During the tenure of Benjamin Netanyahu as finance minister (February 2003 – August 2005), Peretz was fairly cooperative with the government in a series of structural and financial reforms that moved Israel towards a more market-oriented economy. He has remarked that "the most effective strike is the one that didn't occur".

In 1999 Peretz resigned from the Labor Party to form his own party, One Nation. The party won two seats in the Knesset in the 1999 elections, and three in 2003. As Labor's fortunes changed with the Likud Party in government, and Israel's social programmes being dismantled by the market-oriented reforms of finance minister Benjamin Netanyahu, Peretz became increasingly popular with Israel's working-class. By the start of 2004 he was being talked of as a "white knight who will rescue Labor from oblivion". After protracted negotiations with then-Labor Party leader Shimon Peres and other party leaders, One Nation merged with Labor in the summer of 2004.

=== Labor Party leadership ===
After the merger, Peretz ran for the leadership of the Labor Party on a platform of ending the coalition with Likud, led by Prime Minister Ariel Sharon, and reasserting Labor's traditional socialist economic policies. Peretz narrowly defeated Peres, the incumbent leader, in the election on 9 November 2005.

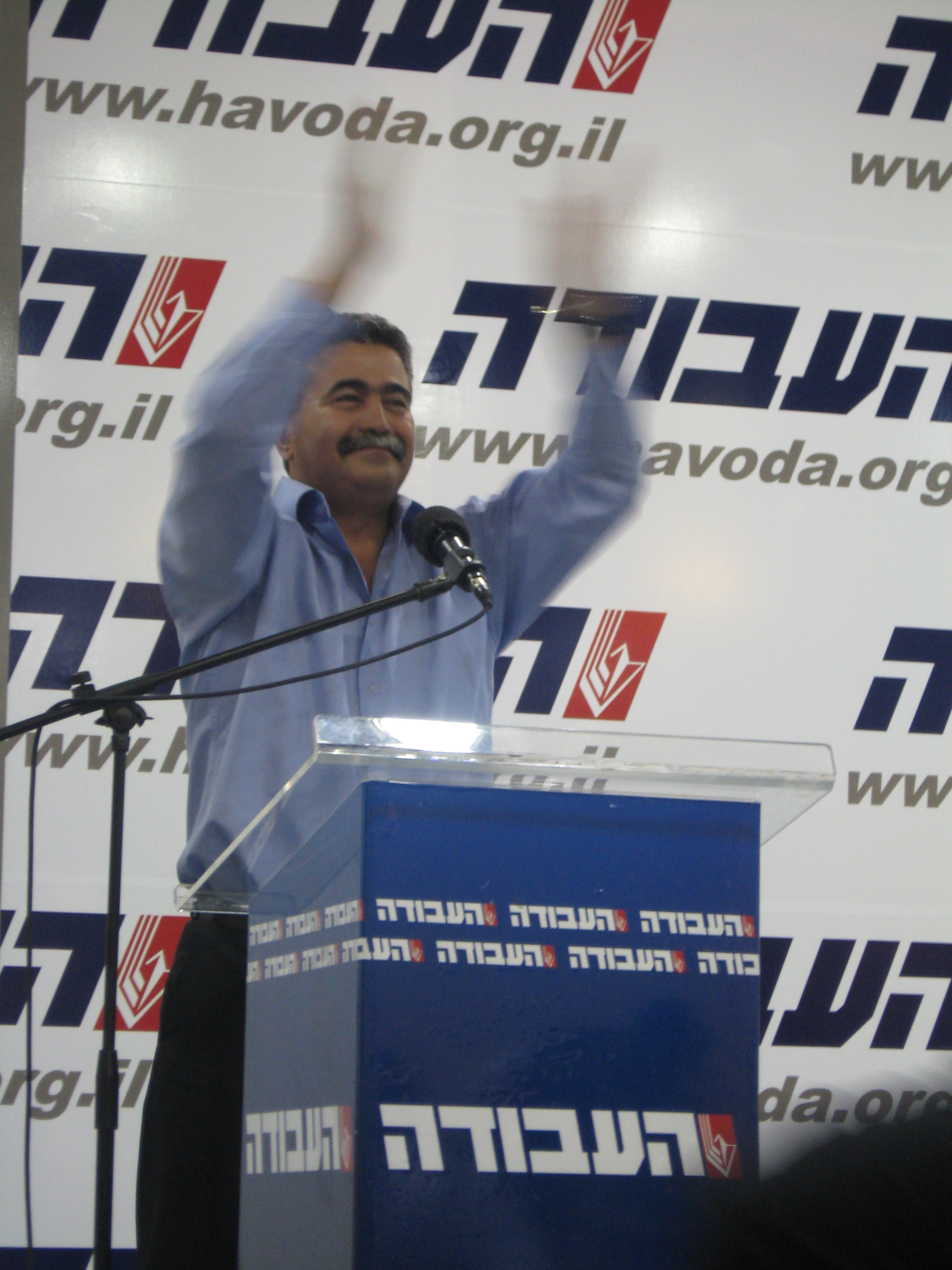
Peretz at a Labor Party rally, April 2008

Peretz won 42% of the vote compared to 40% for Peres and 17% for former defence minister and party leader Binyamin Ben-Eliezer. After winning this election, Peretz resigned from his Histadrut post to focus on winning the election for prime minister. The party withdrew its support for the government on 11 November and all Labor Party cabinet ministers resigned. This action resulted in Prime Minister Ariel Sharon calling a new election for 28 March 2006. Shortly thereafter, Sharon and much of his Cabinet left Likud to form a new party, Kadima. During his period as Labor Party leader, Peretz nominated an Arab Muslim Israeli, Raleb Majadele, to be Minister of Culture, Science and Sports. His nomination was a breakthrough in the relationship between the Arab-Israeli population and the Israeli government. This nomination was criticised by the right-wing party of Yisrael Beiteinu headed by Avigdor Lieberman.

Prior to his entry into government Peretz promised that he would not enter government with Avigdor Liberman's Israel Beytenu party, which has a platform of removing Arabs from Israel by redrawing Israels boundaries, however his party did not protest when on 23 October 2006, Liberman signed a coalition agreement with Kadima, making them a junior coalition partner, leading the Israeli newspaper Haaretz to say that "Amir Peretz has let his voters down in every possible way."

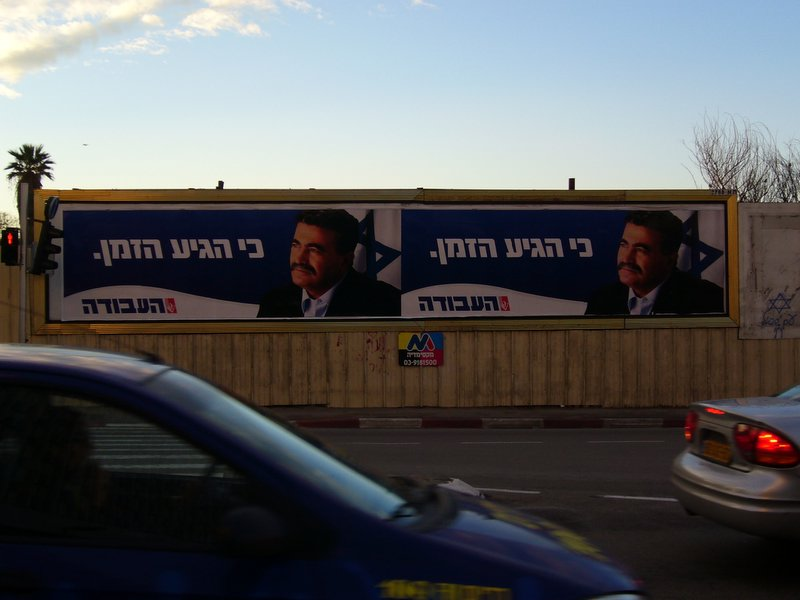
Peretz campaign billboard, Tel Aviv, January 2006. "Ki Higía' Haz'mán" – "Because The Time Has Come"

=== Minister of Defense ===
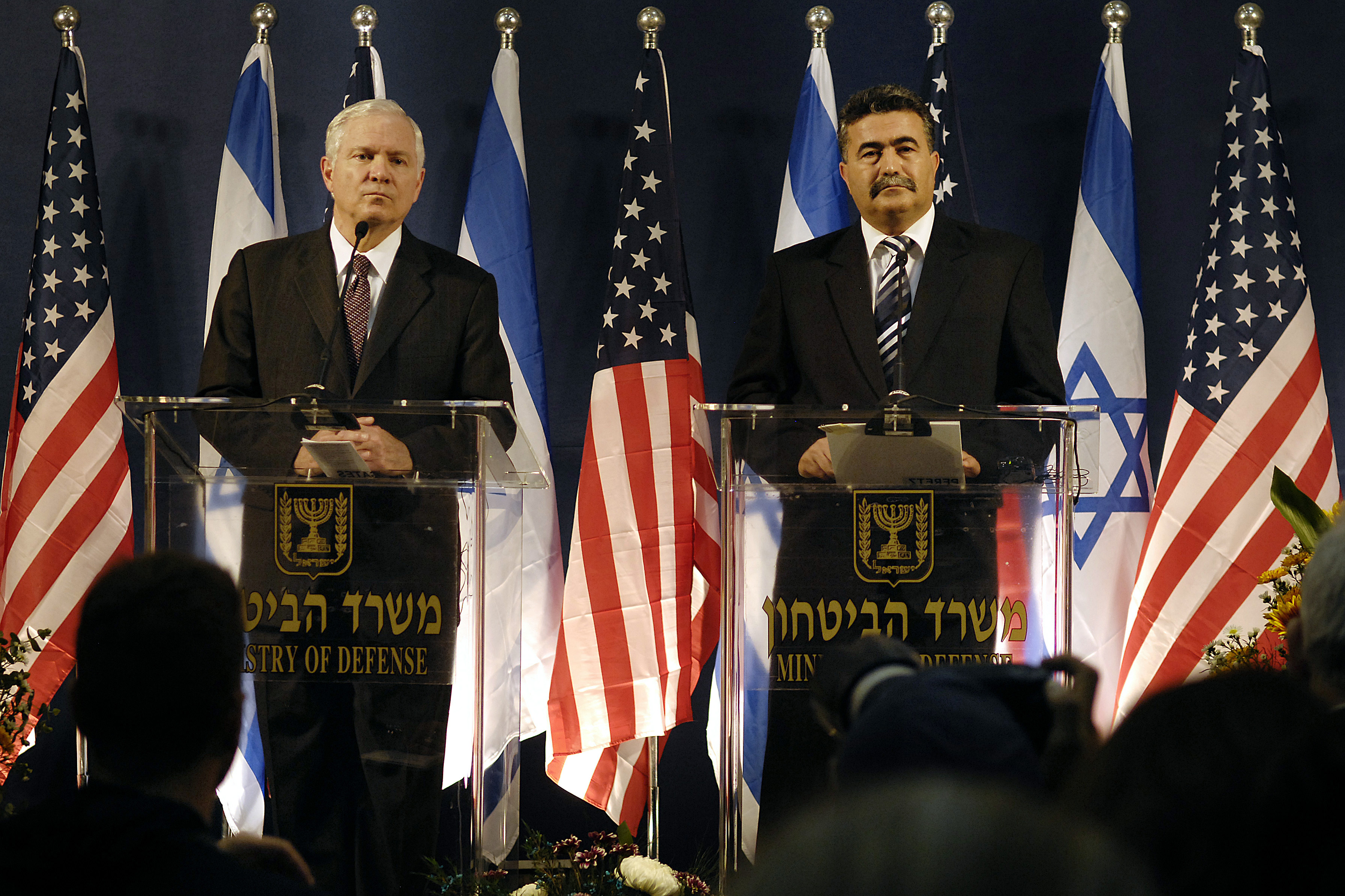
Peretz as Minister of Defense (left: Robert Gates)

Peretz was criticised for abandoning the social agenda that headlined his campaign and accepting the Defense portfolio because of its prestige, rather than the Finance portfolio that better corresponded with the Labor Party social agenda. His performance as a Minister of Defense during the Second Lebanon War was deemed disappointing, which led to early elections for the Labor Party leadership. He was defeated by former Labor Party chairman and former Prime Minister Ehud Barak and resigned from his post.

During his term as Defense Minister, the Second Lebanon war erupted following the capture of two Israeli soldiers by the Lebanese militia Hezbollah from Israel's northern border. Peretz and Olmert launched a campaign against Hezbollah. For 33 days the attacks were carried out via air and land on military and civilian targets. In the last 48 hours of the war, Peretz pushed for a massive ground operation. Land troops were flown by helicopters to seize the ground between the Israeli-Lebanese border and the river Litani. In this operation, at least 33 Israeli soldiers were killed, and much anger was created amongst the Israeli public. The committee that was established by the government to investigate the war, the Winograd Committee, found that the decision to launch this operation was rational and justifiable under the current circumstances. After losing the internal elections in the Labor party to Ehud Barak, Peretz quit the defence ministry in June 2007.

=== Hatnuah ===
Peretz remained in the Knesset after losing his leadership role in the Labor Party and was re-elected in 2009. He opposed Ehud Barak's decision to enter a coalition government headed by Likud leader Benjamin Netanyahu. In December 2012, he left the Labor Party to join Tzipi Livni's new Hatnuah party. As a result, he resigned from the Knesset, and was replaced by Yoram Marciano.

He was re-elected to the Knesset on the Hatnuah list in the 2013 elections, and was appointed Minister of Environmental Protection. However, he resigned from the post on 9 November 2014 due to his opposition to the government's budget plans.

After being re-elected again in 2015 on the Zionist Union list (an alliance of Hatnuah and the Labor Party), Peretz defected from Hatnuah back to the Labor Party in September 2015,

=== Minister of the Economy ===
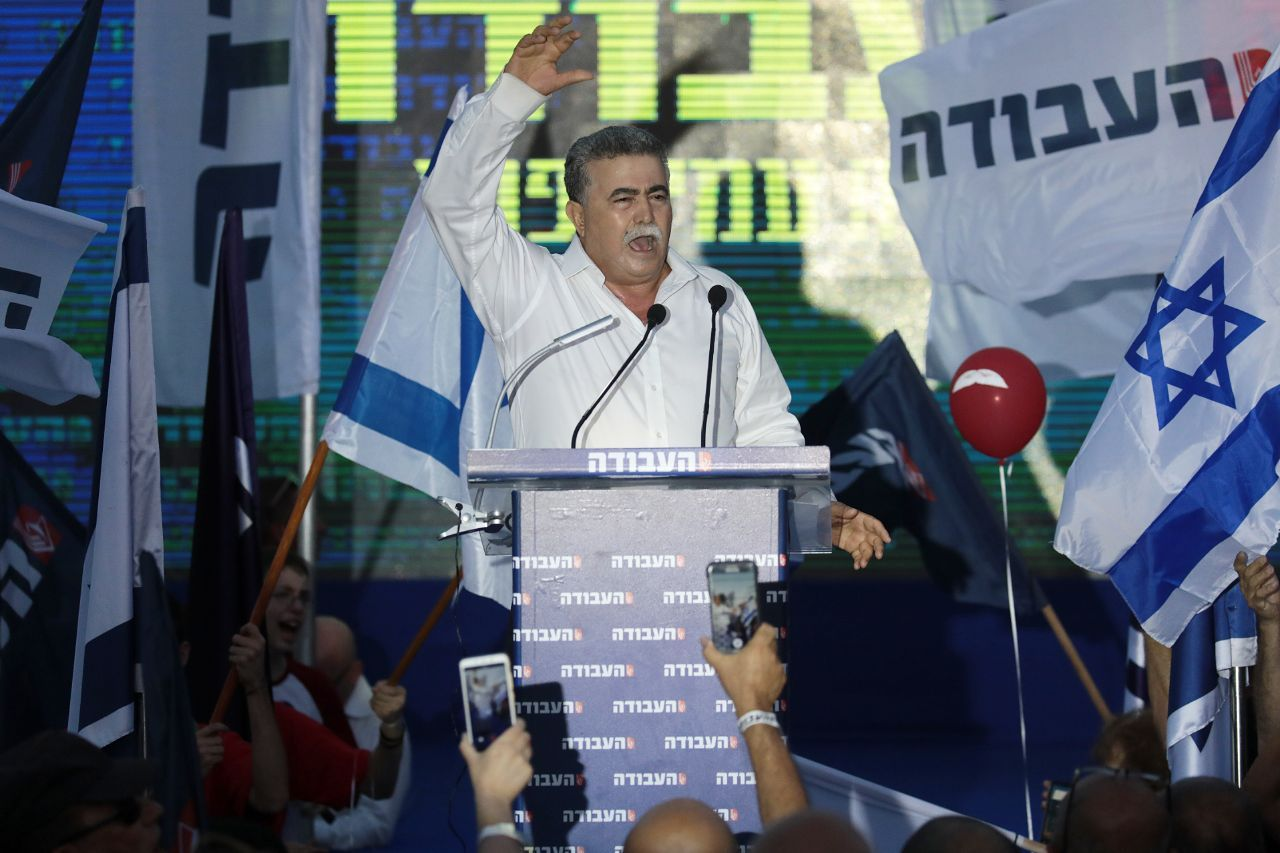
Amir Peretz campaigning, July 2019

Peretz was re-elected as Labor party leader in the 2019 Israeli Labor Party leadership election. In the lead up to the September general elections, Peretz promised to not join a Netanyahu-led government, and in a stunt shaved off his iconic mustache, stating “I decided to remove my mustache so that all of Israel will understand exactly what I'm saying and will be able to read my lips — I won't sit with Bibi.”

On 22 April 2020, following the 2020 Israeli legislative election, Labor announced that it will join the Netanyahu-Gantz coalition, with Peretz serving as Minister of the Economy. As economic minister, Peretz will coordinate with Blue and White on parliamentary matters and policy issues. Despite agreeing to join the new government, Peretz also stated that he and other Labor MKs will still vote against a proposed West Bank annexation plan. On 26 April 2020, 64.2% of the Labor Party's 3,840 central committee members approved of Peretz's decision to join the new government. He was sworn in to this position of 17 May 2020.

=== 2021 presidential bid ===
In December 2020, Peretz declared himself a candidate in the 2021 Knesset vote for Israeli president. He left the Knesset on 29 January 2021 and was replaced by Ilan Gilon, a member of Meretz. However, Peretz dropped out of the presidential race on 5 May.

== Views and opinions ==
=== Social matters ===
During his 2006 campaign Peretz declared that "within two years of taking office I will have eradicated child poverty in Israel". Notwithstanding, he has reiterated his commitment to a market economy. For his movement in latter years towards "third way" positions, as well as for his earthy and warm personality, Peretz has been compared to Brazilian president Lula.

=== Palestinians and the Arab World ===
==== As party politician ====
In matters concerning relations with the Palestinians and the Arab world, candidate Peretz was seen in 2005 as holding dovish positions. He was one of the early leaders of the Peace Now movement. He was also, in the 1980s, a member of a group of eight Labor party Knesset members, dubbed "the Eight" and led by Yossi Beilin, who tried to set a liberal agenda for the party in matters concerning the peace process with the Palestinians. Peretz was said to connect the peace process and internal Israeli social issues. He claimed to believe that the unresolved conflict with the Palestinians has also been a hindrance to the solution of some of Israel's most pressing social ills, such as rising inequality, claiming that he saw the resources allotted to the settlements in the West Bank as having diverted funds that could have helped to solve these problems. He had described the conflict as having mutated Israeli politics, so that the traditional left-right distinctions do not hold: Instead of supporting a social-democratic left which would advance their cause, the lower classes, mostly of Middle Eastern Jewish origins, were diverted to the right by the fanning of nationalist tendencies. Concurrently the left in Israel was usurped by the well-to-do, so that the Labor party had ironically become elitist. Peretz claimed that this is why he saw an intrinsic connection between a solution to the Israeli-Palestinian conflict and the resolving of Israel's internal social tensions. In 2008 Peretz also backed direct negotiations between Israel and the Palestinian movement Hamas.

==== As defense minister ====
Following Peretz's entry into government, however, perceptions of his views towards Palestinians changed, especially as the Defense Minister who led the military in the conflict in Lebanon and with the Hamas group in and around the Gaza Strip. The army's actions under Peretz in Lebanon were described as war crimes by Amnesty International and Human Rights Watch. While Peretz has not repudiated his past views he has been described by Arab MK Ibrahim Sarsur as a "child murderer" in the aftermath of the 2006 Qana airstrike, while Ahmad Tibi said to Peretz "you are a man of war, you are no longer a man of peace."

Amir Peretz was hailed during Operation Pillar of Defense in November 2012 as a defence visionary for having had the foresight while in office back in 2006–2007 to face down myriad sceptics and push for the development of Iron Dome, Israel's unique anti-rocket interceptor system.

Political offices
Preceded by Tommy Lapid	Leader of the Opposition; 2005–2006	Succeeded by Benyamin Netanyahu
Preceded by Shaul Mofaz	Minister of Defence; 2006–2007	Succeeded by Ehud Barak
Preceded by Gilad Erdan	Minister of Environmental Protection; 2013–2014	Succeeded by Avi Gabbay
Preceded by Gilad Erdan	Minister of Economy; 2020–2021	Succeeded by Orna Barbivai
Party political offices
Preceded by Shimon Peres	Leader of the Israeli Labor Party; 2005–2007	Succeeded by Ehud Barak
Preceded by Avi Gabbay	Leader of the Israeli Labor Party; 2019–2021	Succeeded by Merav Michaeli
